= List of Spanish films of 1953 =

A list of films produced in Spain in 1953 (see 1953 in film).

== 1953 ==
Title	Director	Cast	Genre	Notes
1953
Airport	Luis Lucia	Fernando Fernán Gómez, Fernando Rey	Comedy	
The Beauty of Cadiz	Raymond Bernard, Eusebio Fernández Ardavín	Luis Mariano, Carmen Sevilla	Musical	Co-production with France
Bella the Savage	Roberto Rey	Blanquita Amaro, Silvia Morgan	Musical	Co-production with Cuba
Bronze and Moon	Javier Setó	José Suárez, Ana Esmeralda	Drama	
Cabaret	Eduardo Manzanos Brochero	Fernando Rey, José Bódalo	Musical	
Carmen	Giuseppe Maria Scotese	Ana Esmeralda, Mariella Lotti	Drama	Co-production with Italy
The Cheerful Caravan	Ramón Torrado	Paquita Rico, Félix Fernández	Musical	
Condemned to Hang	Ladislao Vajda	Rossano Brazzi, Fosco Giachetti	Historical adventure	Co-production with Italy
Condemned	Manuel Mur Oti	Aurora Bautista, José Suárez	Drama	
Court of Justice	Joaquín Luis Romero Marchent	Marisa de Leza, Elvira Quintillá	Crime	
The Curious Impertinent	Flavio Calzavara	Aurora Bautista, Roberto Rey	Historical	
The Dance of the Heart	Ignacio F. Iquino	Tony Leblanc, Isabel de Castro	Musical	
Daughter of the Sea	Antonio Momplet	Virgílio Teixeira, Isabel de Castro	Drama	
The Devil Plays the Flute	José María Forqué	Luis Prendes, Félix Dafauce	Comedy	
Doña Francisquita	Ladislao Vajda	Mirtha Legrand, Armando Calvo	Comedy	Entered into the 1953 Cannes Film Festival
Fire in the Blood	Ignacio F. Iquino	António Vilar, Marisa de Leza	Drama	
Flight 971	Rafael J. Salvia	José Nieto, Germán Cobos	Drama	
Gypsy Curse	Joaquín Luis Romero Marchent	Luis Sandrini, Julia Caba Alba	Comedy	
I Was a Parish Priest	Rafael Gil	Claude Laydu, Francisco Rabal, Jaime Blanch	Religion	San Sebastian Film Festival winner. Venice Film Festival OCIC Award
Jeromin	Luis Lucia	Jaime Blanch, Ana Mariscal	Historical	
Lawless Mountain	Miguel Lluch	José Suárez, Isabel de Castro	Western	
Lovers of Toledo	Henri Decoin, Fernando Palacios	Alida Valli, Pedro Armendáriz	Historical	Co-production with France and Italy
Magic Concert	Rafael J. Salvia	José María Rodero, Mercedes Monterrey	Musical	
Nobody Will Know	Ramón Torrado	Fernando Fernán Gómez, Julia Martínez	Comedy	
Outstanding	Luis Ligero	Miguel Ligero, Rosita Yarza	Comedy	
Pain	Miguel Morayta	Lola Flores, Luis Aguilar	Musical comedy	Co-production with Mexico
A Passenger Disappeared	Alejandro Perla	Rafael Durán, María Rivas	Drama	
Plot on the Stage	Feliciano Catalán	Enrique Guitart, Encarna Fuentes	Crime	
The Portico of Glory	Rafael J. Salvia	José Mojica, Lina Rosales	Drama	
The Seducer of Granada	Lucas Demare	Luis Sandrini, Malvina Pastorino	Comedy	Co-production with Argentina
Segundo López	Ana Mariscal	Ana Mariscal, Adela Carboné	Melodrama	Spanish Neorealism
Spanish Fantasy	Javier Setó	Antonio Casal, Ángel de Andrés	Comedy	
Such is Madrid	Luis Marquina	Susana Canales, José Suárez	Comedy	
That Happy Couple	Juan Antonio Bardem, Luis García Berlanga	Fernando Fernán Gómez, Elvira Quintillá	Comedy	Directed by the two best known classic Spanish film directors. Spanish Neorealism
That Man from Tangier	Luis María Delgado; Robert Elwyn	Nils Asther, Roland Young	Adventure	Co-production with the US
There's a Road on the Right	Francisco Rovira Beleta	Francisco Rabal, Julia Martínez	Drama	
Two Degrees of Ecuador	Ángel Vilches	José María Seoane, Rosita Yarza	Adventure	
Under the Sky of Spain	Miguel Contreras Torres	Gustavo Rojo, Marisa de Leza	Drama	Co-production with Mexico
Welcome Mr. Marshall!	Luis García Berlanga	José Isbert, Manolo Morán	Comedy	
What Madness!	Ramón Torrado	Pepe Iglesias, Emma Penella	Comedy	
Women's Town	Antonio del Amo	Marujita Díaz, Rubén Rojo	Comedy	
You Had To Be a Gypsy	Rafael Baledón	Pedro Infante, Carmen Sevilla	Comedy	Co-production with Mexico
Younger Brother	Domingo Viladomat	Gustavo Rojo, María Rivas	Drama	
