= The Fan (1958 film) =

- Directed by: José María Elorrieta
- Written by: José Manuel Iglesias
- Starring: Ángel de Andrés; Antonio Riquelme; Mary Santpere
- Cinematography: Alfonso Nieva
- Edited by: Jaime Biadiú
- Music by: Rafael Martínez Torres
- Production company: Ansara Films
- Distributed by: Aparicio
- Release date: 20 June 1958
- Running time: 72 minutes
- Country: Spain
- Language: Spanish

The Fan (Spanish: El hincha) is a 1958 Spanish comedy sports film directed by José María Elorrieta. The film stars Ángel de Andrés, Antonio Riquelme and Mary Santpere.

== Plot ==
A passionate football player complicates the life of his family driven by his passion. Enthusiastic, fanatic, and passionate, the fervor of football runs through the blood of the main character as if it were a matter of life and death. Raised in an atmosphere of football art supporters, the young man organizes his life around this sport. The comedy is understood as a portrait of the world of football, from the point of view of day to day that passes the protagonist fan.

== Cast ==
- Ángel de Andrés
- Antonio Riquelme
- Mary Santpere
- Licia Calderón
- Mario Berriatúa
- Rosita Yarza
- Raúl Cancio
- José María Seoane
- Santiago Rivero
- Juan Antonio Riquelme
- Pastor Serrador
- José Calvo
- Félix Briones
- José María Tasso
- José Riesgo
- Ricardo B. Arévalo
- Mercedes Barranco
- Pedro Beltrán
- Francisco Bernal
- Modesto Blanch
- Juan Cazalilla
- Luis Domínguez Luna
- Celia Foster
- Cristina Galvó
- Alfredo Gil
- Chiti Juárez
- Miguel Lacazy
- Francisco Mallens
- Antonio Molino Rojo
- Pilar de Oro
- Teófilo Palou
- José Manuel Ramirez
- María Luisa Rolando
- Paquito Ruiz
- José Santamaría
- Aníbal Vela

== Bibliography ==
- Pedro López Garcia. Alicantinos en el cine. Cineastas en Alicante. Editorial Club Universitario, 2013.
