= Culprit (disambiguation) =

Culprit is one accused of a crime.

Culprit or Culprits may also refer to:

- Culprit (1917 film), a French silent drama film
- Culprit (1937 film), a French drama film
- Culprit (band), a heavy metal band
- Culprits (film), a 1960 Spanish drama film
- Culprits (TV series), a 2023 British TV series

== See also ==
- Culpable (disambiguation)
- Culpables (disambiguation)
- Culprit 1, British DJ
