= Marbella (film) =

- Directed by: Miguel Hermoso
- Starring: Rod Taylor; Britt Ekland
- Release date: 1985
- Country: Spain
- Language: English

Marbella is a 1985 comedy-romance 'caper film' set in the Spanish coastal resort of Marbella, starring Rod Taylor and Britt Ekland.

== Plot ==
William 'Bill' Anderson, known locally as Commander, is living in Marbella where he has an apartment and a sailboat named High Tide. While fishing near a late-night party being hosted aboard the Five Angels yacht owned by Patrick Arnel, an illegal arms dealer, Commander spots Deborah falling from Patrick's yacht. He quickly dives off the deck of the High Tide and swims across to rescue her.

Unbeknownst to Commander, Deborah was romantically involved with Patrick, but she had broken off the relationship earlier that night aboard the Five Angels. Angered by her decision, Patrick exacts revenge by violently ramming his yacht into Commander's sailboat when he spots Deborah onboard.

Although she is badly shaken by the night's ordeals, Commander takes Deborah safely ashore, but she flees the scene on foot, leaving him perplexed by her erratic behaviour.

Commander then attempts to seek compensation for the damage to his sailboat, but due to numerous falsified witness statements provided to the court by Patrick, Commander fails. He complains to the local police inspector, Vargas, about the lack of justice, but Vargas implies that Commander was never likely to win against a ruthless individual like Patrick.

As Commander leaves the courthouse and walks to his car, he is approached by Deborah, who has been discreetly watching the courthouse from an outdoor cafe. Commander says he could have used her help as a witness in the case, but Deborah warns him that it is unwise to get involved in a feud with a gangster like Patrick.

Commander states that his life would have been better without her, but he offers Deborah a lift to wherever she may be going. Seeming lost and directionless after her split with Patrick, she refuses to leave when Commander asks her to get out of his car. Commander relents, and they drive back to his apartment, where they quickly become an item. As they lie side by side in bed, Commander contemplates methods of revenge against Patrick. Deborah warns him that he won't be able to do it alone, but they may have a chance if they combine forces.

With Commander's desire for vengeance and Deborah's intimate knowledge of Patrick's activities, Commander formulates a plan to swindle Patrick with the use of an impersonator, a forger and a pickpocket. He visits Inspector Vargas for help locating a skilled counterfeiter. Vargas refuses the odd request, causing Commander to declare that Vargas and the local police are afraid of Patrick and are incapable of bringing him to justice.

Commander then returns home, troubled by the cost of repairing the High Tide. He informs Deborah that they will have to sell his apartment and live permanently aboard Commander's sailboat instead. While explaining the predicament, Inspector Vargas arrives on their doorstep in an angry and drunken state. He supplies Commander with the details of a Madrid counterfeiter before staggering away.

Commander then briefly visits Geneva to open a Swiss bank account that will hold the funds he intends to fleece from Patrick.

Back in Marbella, Deborah states that she has located the counterfeiter in Madrid, who now works as a stamp dealer. Commander asks a local Marbella photographer, Gustavo, to begin gathering intelligence by filming Patrick's activities.

Commander then visits the Marbella bank where Patrick holds accounts. He peers into the bank's vault while Patrick is inside and takes note of which safe deposit box Patrick uses. The box serves as the temporary repository for the money Patrick earns from each arms deal. He conceals the money inside a briefcase that is stashed inside the safe deposit box until he can transfer the money to his secret bank account in Switzerland.

Commander then watches from his parked car while Patrick leaves the bank with the cash-filled briefcase. He tails Patrick through the traffic and sees the case being passed to a third party who drives to a location where the case gets concealed inside a nondescript sack that is put aboard Patrick's yacht, the Five Angels.

From there, the money is transported out of Marbella to be transferred to Patrick's Swiss account after each illegal arms deal.

Deborah then informs Commander that she has located a suitable disguise artist in Madrid to enlist. Commander goes to Madrid to find him and to visit the counterfeiter and stamp dealer, Herman Gomez. Commander asks Herman to demonstrate his forgery skills by copying Patrick's signature and asks for the name of a good local pickpocket. Herman recommends John, now homeless. They visit a Madrid clairvoyant who knows John's address, a run-down and disused local tenement. Herman convinces him to get involved in Commander's scheme.

Commander observes John's pickpocketing skill in a trial-run on a Madrid commuter train, but they disembark with Commander unconvinced of John's abilities until Herman points out that John successfully stole a passenger's wallet and placed it in Commander's jacket pocket.

Together the three then visit the seedy Madrid nightclub where the disguise artist Mario works. Mario refuses to get involved, fearful of doing something illegal. Commander bribes the nightclub owner to fire Mario. As he leaves the club jobless, Mario is confronted by the trio, who entice him financially.

With his team of accomplices now established, Commander convenes a meeting to explain his plan. He shows them a copy of Patrick's briefcase, stashed at the bank in Marbella, which carries $3 million in cash, Patrick's usual commission for each illegal arms deal.

Commander explains that Patrick funnels the profits in his Marbella safe deposit box into a numbered and anonymous Swiss account with no name. Commander tells them that he plans to open Patrick's briefcase at the bank in Marbella and replace the Swiss deposit slip inside the briefcase with an identical-looking deposit slip for Commander's Swiss account, which is also a numbered account with no name, held at the same Swiss bank that Patrick uses.

Commander offers the trio fifty percent of Patrick's $3 million if they get involved. He says they will be long-gone by the time Patrick discovers that his deposit slip has been switched to a deposit slip of an account not belonging to him.

The four then travel from Madrid to Marbella, where Commander introduces the trio to Deborah. Herman's daughter, Mirian, also travels to Marbella from her home in Madrid, insisting that she be a part of the antics. Commander is angered by Mirian inserting herself into his plans, but he relents when he sees her sunbathing topless in his garden. Deborah looks on, concerned that Commander may be getting infatuated with Mirian.

Meanwhile, Mario is caught photographing Patrick's mansion. When he is taken hostage, he says he will complain to the police, causing Patrick to strike him with a wooden paddlestick, breaking his arm. When Commander learns from Herman and John that Mario has failed to return from his surveillance of the mansion, they conduct a daring night-time raid to rescue him.

With Mario's broken arm now in a plaster cast, Commander decides that Mario will be unable to successfully impersonate Patrick. Faced with the prospect of having to abandon the entire scheme, Commander hastily engineers a plan to enlist the help of a former military acquaintance, Sergeant Major McBride, who resides in Gibraltar, off the coat of Spain. He sets sail for Gibraltar to discuss the plan.

After he leaves port, Commander discovers that Mirian has stowed away on the High Tide. He demands that she return to Marbella aboard the High Tide's inflatable dinghy, but Mirian refuses, stating that she would like to see Gibraltar. Frustrated by her impertinence, Commander chases her around the High Tide while she laughs and teases him. When he catches up with her, Mirian's tank top is accidentally ripped off, revealing her breasts, and the pair kiss romantically. They then travel to Gibraltar together.

Mirian rests in a hotel room she shares with Commander while Commander speaks to McBride. When they arrive back in Marbella, McBride gatecrashes a party that Patrick is attending. McBride attacks Patrick, breaking his arm.

With Patrick and Mario now both nursing broken arms in plaster, Mario can successfully disguise himself to closely resemble Patrick. Commander informs his accomplices that the ruse will now go ahead.

With Patrick due to retrieve his cash-filled briefcase from the bank's security vault the following day, Commander waits at Patrick's mansion the next morning to determine what garments Patrick is wearing so Mario can wear the same colours when he impersonates Patrick at the bank.

Meanwhile Deborah is waiting near the house of the bank concierge who assists Patrick with his accounts. She asks for a lift due to a car problem, and as they drive into town together, Deborah grabs the glasses from the concierge's face, making his vision blurry and causing him to lose control of his vehicle.

When the car jolts to an abrupt stop, Deborah cracks the lenses on the glasses, to make it harder for the concierge to detect that Mario is in fact not Patrick but an impersonator at the bank.

Deborah then begins to look for garments in downtown Marbella for Mario to wear. Meanwhile, Mirian sits in a parked car, intending to create an accident when Patrick drives past, to delay his arrival at the bank. She pulls out in front of Patrick's limousine, causing a collision. As Patrick steps out of the car to investigate the damage, John discreetly removes Patrick's safe deposit key from his jacket.

John then runs to find Mario and give him the stolen key so Mario can enter the bank and open Patrick's safe deposit box.

Inspector Vargas, a confederate in the group's plans unbeknownst to them, further delays Patrick's departure from the accident by asking what occurred.

The group's tactics work, giving them enough time to get into Patrick's safe deposit box before he arrives at the bank after the delay.

At the bank, Mario has successfully passed himself off as Patrick. He opens Patrick's briefcase full of money. Herman waits near the safe deposit stronghold, pretending to attend to other business. Mario removes the signed deposit slip inside the briefcase that Patrick will use to deposit the money into his Swiss bank account. Herman forges Patrick's signature onto a new deposit slip that contains Commander's Swiss bank account number instead of Patrick's.

The briefcase full of money is then returned to Patrick's safe deposit box with everything appearing normal.

As Patrick arrives at the bank after his car accident, John deliberately bumps into him, discreetly dropping Patrick's safe deposit key back into his jacket pocket, while disguise artist Mario gingerly walks out of the bank unnoticed. Patrick goes to his safe deposit box, opens the box as usual and walks out of the bank with his briefcase, not knowing that the briefcase now contains a forged bank transfer slip that will divert Patrick's cash into Commander's Swiss account instead of Patrick's.

Commander waits discreetly near Patrick's yacht and watches as Patrick's cash is loaded onto the yacht in the usual manner, concealed inside a sack to be transferred to Switzerland. Knowing that Patrick's funds will be in Commander's Swiss account the following morning, Commander and his accomplices celebrate with champagne. He tells them that they will leave for Geneva the next day to claim their millions.

Noticing that Mirian is not present at the gathering, Commander is informed that she and Mario headed out for drinks together. Commander searches for them and finds Mirian at an outdoor bar where she and Mario are discussing their plans for the future.

Angry at how close Mirian and Mario are becoming, Commander pulls Mirian aside and asks her to return with him. He expresses his love for her, but Mirian informs him that she has no desire to marry him or anyone else. The situation becomes heated, with Commander pushing Mario away. Mirian abuses Commander and says she will have nothing more to do with him.

Commander leaves to find solace in a bottle of whiskey. Later that night, he returns to his sailboat, the High Tide, in a drunken and frustrated state, where he finds that Deborah has been waiting for him. The next morning Herman, John and Mario arrive at the High Tide's mooring to begin the journey to Switzerland. They learn that Commander and Deborah had been noticed leaving the boat with all of their luggage in-tow. Herman, John and Mario walk away from the port, feeling duped and cheated by Commander.

Having fled Marbella to escape any revenge or retribution by Patrick after fleecing him of his money, Commander and Deborah move into a large estate hidden by heavy foliage. Fearing that Patrick may be trying to track them down, Commander takes cover when he spots a light plane overhead that may be a search aircraft sent out by Patrick.

Deborah ignores Commander's warning to hide, causing Commander to admonish her recklessness. Despite all of their newfound wealth, she complains that she doesn't want to live in fear and declares that she plans to leave their hideaway.

After some harsh words, Deborah packs her belongings into a taxi and departs, causing Commander to contemplate a life spent alone in his secluded refuge.

Back in Marbella, Mirian shows John and Herman a newspaper report stating that Patrick has been killed in Amsterdam by a mystery assailant, which quickly attracts the attention of Deborah, who is now residing back in Marbella.

With Patrick out of the picture, Commander also returns to Marbella. He spots Herman sitting at a small table on the waterfront where he is again selling stamps and trinkets. When Commander enquires about the cost of the stamps, Herman says "200 pesetas" without looking up. Commander replies, "I'll take the whole lot for a million dollars, if you like". Herman peers up from his newspaper to see Commander smiling down at him benevolently.

== Cast ==
Co-starring with Rod Taylor (Commander) and Britt Ekland (Deborah) were José Guardiola (who plays the gangster villain Patrick Arnel) and Emma Suárez, with whom Taylor's character, Commander, has a brief romantic fling before losing her to his younger sidekick Mario, played by Óscar Ladoire.

Other actors who appeared in the film include Sancho Gracia, Francisco Rabal and Fernando Fernán Gómez. They play the roles of Inspector Vargas, John (Juan) and Herman Gómez, respectively.

- Óscar Ladoire as Mario
- Miguel Rellán as Gustavo
- Elena Arnao as Albi
- Conrado San Martín as Judge
- Emmanuele D. Black as 1st Attorney
- Manuel de Blas as Judge
- Francisco Vidal as concierge
- Alberto Fernández as manager
- Quino Pueyo as drunk
- César Varona as Marcelo
- Jorge Bosso as security guard
- Kunio Kovayashi as Chófer de Patrick
- Emilio Linder as lawyer
- Emilio Fornet as old man
- Charly Bravo as bodyguard 1
- Joaquín Parra as bodyguard 2
- Pedro Sopeña as youngster
- Al Larson as McBride
- Albert Ferdinand as Manager

== Filming locations ==
Apart from Spanish filming locations in Marbella and Madrid, the movie also features scenes filmed in Geneva and in the narrow streets and alleys of Gibraltar, 50 miles off the Spanish coast.

== Trivia ==
Although Rod Taylor's character Commando is American, Taylor himself was an Australian. When he won a 'Rolo' acting award early in his career in Australia that included an airfare to London via Los Angeles, Taylor disembarked in Los Angeles without ever continuing on to London or returning to Australia. He successfully established himself as an actor in Hollywood and spent the remaining 60 years of his life in Los Angeles.

Spanish actor Sancho Gracia, who plays the role of Inspector Vargas, was involved in an affair with Raquel Welch in Spain in 1968 during the filming of the movie 100 Rifles. At the time, Welch was married to producer Patrick Curtis. When Curtis learned of the romantic fling, he chased Gracia at gunpoint through the Aguadulce hotel where the cast and crew of 100 Rifles were staying.

Paul Chiten, a Los Angeles-based songwriter who has worked with many major musical stars including Cyndi Lauper and Donna Summer, penned the Marbella soundtrack, including the film's radio-friendly endispiece, 'Poet For the Moonlight', sung by vocalist Devere Duckett.
