= Martes y 13 =

Martes y 13 could refer to:

- Tuesday the 13th, the Spanish equivalent to Friday the 13th
- Martes y Trece, Spanish comedy group, 1978–1997
- Martes 13 (TV program), Chilean TV program broadcast 1983-1995 on Canal 13
- Martes y trece (film), a 1961 Spanish comedy featuring Licia Calderón
