= Spanish Affair =

Spanish Affair may refer to:

- Spanish Affair (1957 film), an American–Spanish drama film
- Spanish Affair (2014 film), a Spanish comedy film
