= Fuego en la sangre =

Fuego en la sangre may refer to:

- Fuego en la sangre (1966 film), a 1966 Argentine film
- Fuego en la sangre (TV series), a 2008 Mexican telenovela
- Fire in the Blood (1953 film) (Fuego en la sangre), a 1953 Spanish drama film

== See also ==
- Fire in the Blood (disambiguation)
