= Kubala (film) =

- Directed by: Arturo Ruiz Castillo
- Written by: Ladislao Kubala; Clemente Pamplona; Alfredo Rueda; Arturo Ruiz Castillo; Jesús Vasallo
- Produced by: Antonio Bofarull
- Starring: Ladislao Kubala
- Cinematography: Salvador Torres Garriga
- Edited by: Rosa G. Salgado
- Production company: Titán Films
- Release date: 4 January 1955
- Country: Spain
- Language: Spanish

Kubala or Aces Looking for Peace (Spanish: Los ases buscan la paz) is a 1955 Spanish sports film directed by Arturo Ruiz Castillo. It portrays the life of the Hungarian footballer Ladislao Kubala who plays himself. Kubala moved to Spain where he played for FC Barcelona and the Spain national football team. The film has a Cold War anti-communist theme which was in line with the policy of General Franco's regime. A film about and starring the Argentine-born Real Madrid player Alfredo Di Stéfano was released the following year.

== Cast ==
- Ladislao Kubala
- Irán Eory
- Mariano Asquerino
- Antonio Ozores
- José Guardiola
- Antonio Queipo
- Eugenio Testa
- Branco Kubala
- Laci Kubala
- Gérard Tichy
- Antonio Bofarull
- Juan Montfort
- Alfonso Tuset
- Matías Prats
- José Samitier
- Antonio Ramallets
- Estanislao Basora

== Bibliography ==
- Bentley, Bernard. A Companion to Spanish Cinema. Boydell & Brewer 2008.
