= José Manuel Martín =

Spanish actor

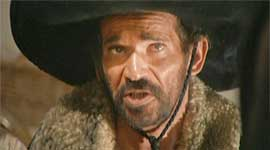
- José Manuel Martín in I Want Him Dead (1968)
- Born: José Manuel Martín Pérez; 24 May 1924; Casavieja, Spain
- Died: 12 April 2006 (aged 81)
- Other names: J. Manuel Martin, Jose M. Martin, Jose Manuel Martin, José M. Martin, José Manuel Martí, J. Manuel Martín, J.M. Martín, Jose M. Martín, José M. Martín, Manuel Martín, J. Manuel Martín Pérez, J.M. Martín Pérez
- Occupations: Film and television actor Screenwriter
- Years active: 1952–1989

José Manuel Martín Pérez (24 May 1924 – 12 April 2006) was a Spanish film and television actor, radio broadcaster, and screenwriter. He was a popular character actor in Spanish cinema during the 1950s and 60s, best remembered for playing villainous henchmen, appearing in more than 100 film and television productions.

Born in Casavieja, Spain, Martín studied at Madrid's Teatro Español Universitario and the Lope de Rueda, and began working for Radio Nacional de España in 1942, before making his feature film debut in César Fernández Ardavín's 1952 war drama La llamada de África starring Ali Beiba Uld Abidin, Yahadid Ben Ahmed Lehbib and Farachi Ben Emboiric.

Martín was particularly noted for his work in the Spaghetti Western genre, alongside regulars such as Aldo Sambrell and Andrea Scotti, with supporting roles in Savage Guns (1961), Gunfighters of Casa Grande (1964), Minnesota Clay(1964), A Pistol for Ringo (1965), Seven Dollars on the Red (1966), Arizona Colt (1966), A Bullet for the General (1966), God Forgives... I Don't! (1967), 100 Rifles (1969), and Cut-Throats Nine (1972). He also had memorable roles in EuroHorror films such as The Castle of Fu Manchu (1969), The Sinister Eyes of Dr. Orloff (1973), Count Dracula's Great Love (1974), and Curse of the Devil (1974).

== Early life ==
José Manuel Martín Pérez was born on 24 May 1924 in Casavieja, Ávila, Castilla y León, Spain . He initially studied at the Teatro Español Universitario in Madrid with José Luis López Vázquez, María Jesús Valdés and Valeriano Andrés before obtaining a scholarship at the Lope de Rueda. It was there that he started working in professional theater under Alejandro Ulloa. Starting in 1942, he was also employed as a broadcaster for Radio Nacional de España. Martín eventually received a bachelor degree in journalism.

== Career ==
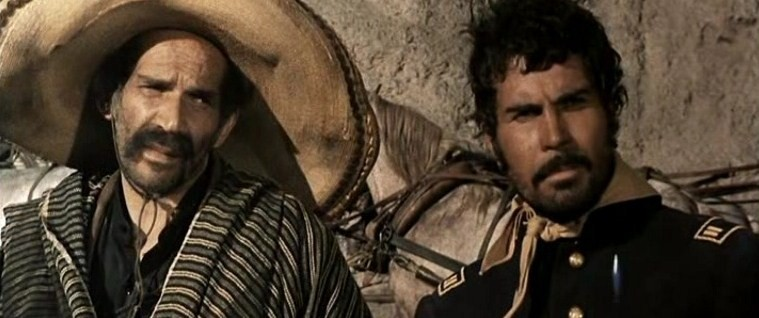
Martín (left), with co-star José Canalejas, in the Tonino Valerii Spaghetti Western Per il gusto di uccidere (1966)

At age 28, Martín made his feature film debut in the war drama La llamada de África (1952), written and directed by César Fernández Ardavín, and starred Ali Beiba Uld Abidin, Yahadid Ben Ahmed Lehbib and Farachi Ben Emboiric. This was followed by minor roles in Ángel Vilches' adventure film A dos grados del ecuador (1953), the Luis Lucia comedy Aeropuerto (1953), and Rafael Gil's religious-themed historical dramas I Was a Parish Priest (1953) and Judas' Kiss (1954). He received his first supporting role, as Muñoz, in Gil's next film Murió hace quince años (1954) appearing alongside Rafael Rivelles, Francisco Rabal and Lyla Rocco. He made two other films with Gil, La otra vida del capitán Contreras (1955) and El canto del gallo (1955), as well part of the supporting cast in Javier Setó's dramas Duelo de pasiones (1956) and Ha pasado un hombre (1956), Pedro Luis Ramírez's comedy Los ladrones somos gente honrada (1956), and José María Ochoa's La mestiza (1956). He appeared in one more film for Rafael Gil that same year, Miracle of the White Suit (1956), and landed an important supporting roles in Spanish Affair (1957), co-directed by Don Siegel and Luis Marquina, Sergio Corbucci's Ángeles sin cielo (1957), and Luis Buñuel's Viridiana (1961). He also started working in television joining the cast of Diego Valor in 1958. Martín continued on in supporting roles for number of other films then being shot in Almería and elsewhere.

== Spaghetti Westerns ==
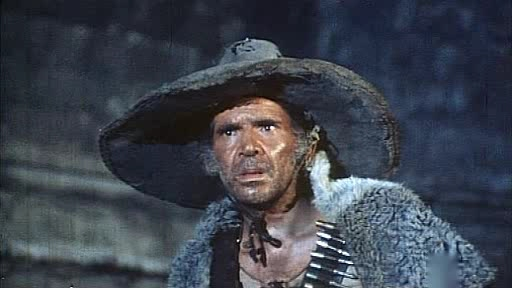
Martín as "Cherokee" in the Gino Mangini Spaghetti Western Bastard, Go and Kill (1971).

In the early-1960s, Eurowesterns, which would evolve into the popular Spaghetti Westerns, were being shot in Almería. Martín was among a number of Spanish character actors to find fame in this new genre. His background playing villains made him ideal for being cast as a Mexican bandit or henchman. Martín's prolific appearances made him was one of the most recognizable Spanish actors involved in the genre, rivaling those of fellow Spaghetti Western regulars such as Aldo Sambrell and Andrea Scotti, and is considered one of the best villains of the era.

His first roles were in Savage Guns and Gunfighters of Casa Grande (1964), one of the genre's earliest films, and continued working at its height with memorable performances in Bullets Don't Argue (1964), Minnesota Clay(1964), A Pistol for Ringo (1965), Seven Dollars on the Red (1966), Arizona Colt (1966), A Bullet for the General (1966), Blood River (1967), I Want Him Dead (1968), 100 Rifles (1969), A Bullet for Sandoval (1969), and into the "twilight" Spaghetti Westerns Bastard, Go and Kill (1971), Amigo, Stay Away (1972), and Cut-Throats Nine (1972). His last Italo-Western appearance, Amigo, Stay Away, was an uncredited role as a peddler.

In between Spaghetti Westerns, Martín also had supporting roles in The Ceremony (1963), Operation Atlantis (1965), Fall of the Mohicans (1965), Con el viento solano (1966), and Bewitched Love (1967).

== Later career ==
In the late-1960s and 70s, Martín starred in Spanish horror films such as Sax Rohmer's The Castle of Fu Manchu (1969), The Sinister Eyes of Dr. Orloff (1973), Count Dracula's Great Love (1974), and Curse of the Devil (1974). An author of numerous poems, he occasionally tried his hand at screenwriting. His first script was for Rafael Romero Marchent's The Student Connection (1974), co-written with Luciano Ercoli, José Luis Navarro, and Marchent.

Martín went into semi-retirement in the late-1970s. He made several guest appearances on the popular action-adventure television series Curro Jiménez, starring Sancho Gracia, in 1977. Other notable performances included supporting roles in Alberto Vázquez Figueroa's Oro rojo (1978), Mariano Ozores' comedy western Al este del oeste (1984), Jaime Camino's Spanish Civil War film Dragón Rapide (1986), and the Peter Lilienthal sports film Der Radfahrer von San Cristóbal (1988). His last regular film was an uncredited role in Montoyas y Tarantos (1989) followed by a final appearance in the crime-drama film Amor propio (1994) directed by Mario Camus. He also wrote two more scripts during the decade: Ángel Martínez Astudillo short film El pisito (1996) and the comedy Maestros (2000), which he co-wrote with director Óscar del Caz.

In the early-2000s, Martín made one-time guest appearances on television series Policías, en el corazón de la calle and Los Serrano. He also had a cameo on Dunia Ayaso and Félix Sabroso's dramady Descongélate! (2003), starring Pepón Nieto, Candela Peña and Loles León.

== Personal life and death ==
Martín died on 12 April 2006, at the age of 81.

== Filmography ==
Year	Title	Role	Notes
1952	The Call of Africa	Sargento	
1953	Two Degrees of Ecuador	Unknown	
1953	I Was a Parish Priest	Unknown	
1953	Airport	Unknown	Uncredited
1954	Judas' Kiss	Joven miserable	(as J.M. Martín Pérez)
1954	He Died Fifteen Years Ago	Muñoz	(as J. Manuel Martín Pérez)
1955	The Other Life of Captain Contreras	Dr. Rad	
1955	Duelo de pasiones	Unknown	
1955	The Cock Crow	Preso	
1956	Ha pasado un hombre	Savatierra	
1956	We Thieves Are Honourable	Antón, El Mayordomo	
1956	La mestiza	Joe	
1956	Miracle of the White Suit	Jugador	
1957	Spanish Affair	Fernando	
1957	Ángeles sin cielo	Curro	
1958	El aprendiz de malo	Socio de Bautista	
1958	Die Sklavenkarawane	Miralei	
1959	Luna de verano	Unknown	
1959	Gayarre	Frascuelo	
1959	Two Men in Town	Unknown	
1959	Leap to Fame	Enfermo de cólera	
1959	Molokai, la isla maldita	Unknown	(as José M. Martín)
1959	Sonatas	Primer centinela	
1959	Life Around Us	Manolo - gángster	
1959	Der Löwe von Babylon	Aftab	
1960	Juicio final	Unknown	
1960	Juanito	Carras	(as José M. Martin)
1960	El hombre de la isla	Pescador	
1960	Peace Never Comes	Karazo	
1960	At Five O'Clock in the Afternoon	Secretario	Uncredited
1961	Conqueror of Maracaibo	Patcheye Pirate	
1961	Viridiana	Beggar	
1961	Savage Guns	Sequra	
1962	Mentirosa	Tomás	
1962	Cupido contrabandista	Walter	
1962	Three Fables of Love	Aveugle	(segment "La mort et le bûcheron")
1962	Dulcinea	Posadero	
1963	The Castilian	Centinela	
1963	Cristo negro	Charles	
1963	Shéhérazade	Abdallah	(as J.M. Martín)
1963	Los Tarantos	Curro	(as J. Manuel Martín)
1963	The Ceremony	2nd Gendarme	
1963	Three Ruthless Ones	Richard	
1964	Weeping for a Bandit	"El Tuerto"	
1964	Bullets Don't Argue	Ramon	
1964	Minnesota Clay	Ortiz Henchman	Uncredited
1964	Rueda de sospechosos	Camarero del Manzanilla	
1964	Gunfighters of Casa Grande	Don Luis Ariola	Uncredited
1965	A Pistol for Ringo	Pedro	
1965	Fall of the Mohicans	Cunning Fox	
1965	Man from Canyon City	Esteban	
1965	Operation Atlantis	Nailawi	
1965	Operation Double Cross	Jaime	
1966	Cuatro dólares de venganza	Manuel de Losa	
1966	Seven Dollars on the Red	El Gringo / Chulo	
1966	Kiss Kiss...Bang Bang	Jamaica	Uncredited
1966	With the East Wind	Zafra	(as Manuel Martín)
1966	Per il gusto di uccidere	Rodrigo	
1966	Arizona Colt	Watch Henchman	
1966	Fort Yuma Gold	Sam	
1966	Five for Revenge	Ramon	
1966	Django Shoots First	Ringo	Uncredited
1967	A Bullet for the General	Raimundo	
1967	Bewitched Love	Lorenzo	
1967	Operation Delilah	Joe	
1967	God Forgives... I Don't!	Bud	(as José Manuel Martin)
1967	Fifteen Scaffolds for the Killer	Benny	
1967	Forty Degrees in the Shade	Compañero de Evaristo	
1967	Pride and Vengeance	Juan	Uncredited
1967	A Minute to Pray, a Second to Die	"El Bailarin"	Uncredited
1968	Train for Durango	Peons Speaker	Uncredited
1968	I Want Him Dead	Jack Blood	
1968	Day After Tomorrow	Espartero	
1968	Commando Attack	Danny detto Faccia di Morto	
1969	100 Rifles	Sarita's Father	(as Jose Manuel Martin)
1969	Marquis de Sade: Justine	Victor	
1969	The Castle of Fu Manchu	Omar Pashu	(as Jose Manuel Martin)
1969	The Forgotten Pistolero	Miguel	
1969	A Bullet for Sandoval	Guerico	
1969	El médico y el curandero	Unknown	Short
1970	Fortunata and Jacinta	Fortunata's Uncle	
1970	La larga agonía de los peces fuera del agua	Hombre de la pistola	
1970	Juan Pedro the Scyther	Unknown	
1970	Arizona Colt Returns	José Gonzalez Moreno	
1970	No desearás al vecino del quinto	Taxista	(as Jose M. Martín)
1970	The Wind's Fierce	Garcia	
1971	Bastard, Go and Kill	Cherokee	
1971	El Cristo del Océano	Libio	
1971	Boulevard du Rhum	Un Policier Panaméen	Uncredited
1971	Death Walks on High Heels	Smith	(as J. Manuel Martin)
1971	Hunt the Man Down	Mexican Soldier	
1972	Ben and Charlie	The Peddler	Uncredited
1972	Antony and Cleopatra	Guard	Uncredited
1972	Cut-Throats Nine	John McFarlane	
1973	Count Dracula's Great Love	Krakos - First Porteador	(as Jose Manuel Martin)
1973	El Retorno de Walpurgis	Bela	(as Jose M. Martin)
1973	Pugni, pirati e karatè	Pirate	Uncredited
1973	The Sinister Eyes of Dr. Orloff	Albert Mathews	
1974	El último viaje	Manolo	
1976	La espada negra	Unknown	
1977	Del amor y de la muerte	Unknown	
1977	A Dog Called... Vengeance	Cuatrero	(as Jose Manuel Martin)
1978	Oro rojo	Empleador	
1980	Adiós, querida mamá	David	
1984	Al este del oeste	Bad Milk	(as Jose Manuel Martin)
1986	Dragón Rapide	Oficial ayudante del General Franco	(as José Manuel Martí)
1988	El Lute II: Tomorrow I'll be Free	Emilio	
1988	Der Radfahrer von San Cristóbal	Camillo	
1988	The Brother from Space	Unknown	Uncredited
1989	Montoyas y Tarantos	Unknown	Uncredited
1994	Amor propio	Quico	
2003	Descongélate!	Unknown	

As a screenwriter

Year	Title	Role	Notes
1974	The Student Connection	Co-writer	(as José M. Martin)
1996	El pisito	Writer	Short
2000	Maestros	Writer	

=== Television ===
Year	Title	Role	Notes
1958	Diego Valor	Mekong	
1965	Estudio 1	Casca	Episode: "Julio César"
1974	Los camioneros	Rogelio	Episode: "Seis toros y uno toreado"
1977	Curro Jiménez		Episode: "Carambola a tres bandas" Episode: "El secuestro" Episode: "Veinte mil onzas mejicanas"
1983	La comedia		Episode: "El baile de los ladrones"
2000	Policías, en el corazón de la calle		Episode: "Vivir se ha puesto al rojo vivo"
2004	Los Serrano		Episode: "El fluido básico", (final appearance)
