= El Hincha =

El Hincha may refer to:

- The Fan (1951 film), a 1951 Argentine sports comedy film
- The Fan (1958 film), a 1958 Spanish comedy sports film
