= Fire in the Blood =

Fire in the Blood may refer to:

- Fire in the Blood, UK title of 1954 French film La Rage au corps
- Fire in the Blood, 1990 single by British band Matt Bianco
- Fire in the Blood, title of English translation of novel Chaleur du Sang by Irène Némirovsky, published posthumously in 2007
- Brimstone Angels: Fire in the Blood, title of a fantasy novel from the series The Brimstone Angels by Erin M. Evans, published in 2014
- Fire in the Blood (2013 film), documentary film
- Fire in the Blood (1953 film), a Spanish drama film
- Fire in the Blood, 2011 composition for brass band by Paul Lovatt-Cooper

== See also ==
- Fuego en la sangre (disambiguation)
