= The Gold Suit =

- Directed by: Julio Coll
- Written by: Julio Coll; Lluís Josep Comerón; Jorge Illa
- Cinematography: Salvador Torres Garriga
- Music by: Xavier Montsalvatge
- Production company: Eolo U.C.
- Distributed by: Universal Films Española
- Release date: 16 May 1960
- Running time: 90 minutes
- Country: Spain
- Language: Spanish

The Gold Suit (Spanish: El traje de oro) is a 1960 Spanish film directed by Julio Coll.

== Cast ==
- Manuel Alexandre
- Antonio Borrero 'Chamaco'
- José Calvo
- Alberto Closas
- Marisa de Leza
- Carlos Larrañaga
- Rogelio Madrid
- José Nieto
- Marisa Prado

== Bibliography ==
- Pascual Cebollada & Luis Rubio Gil. Enciclopedia del cine español: cronología. Ediciones del Serbal, 1996.
