= Rafael Luis Calvo =

Spanish actor (1911–1988)

Rafael Calvo
- Born: 30 December 1911; Madrid, Spain
- Died: 9 December 1988 aged 76; Barcelona, Spain
- Other name: Rafael Luis Calvo Muñoz
- Occupation: Actor
- Years active: 1923–1964 (film)

Rafael Luis Calvo Muñoz (Note: In this Spanish name, the first or paternal surname is Calvo and the second or maternal family name is Muñoz.) (30 December 1911 – 9 December 1988) was a Spanish film actor. He appeared in more than 60 films including Miracle of Marcelino (1955).

== Selected filmography ==
- Arribada forzosa (1944) - Matón de Mariano
- Una mujer en un taxi (1944)
- The Holy Queen (1947) - Fernán Ayres
- When the Angels Sleep (1947) - Ventura
- El ángel gris (1947) - Ramón
- The Drummer of Bruch (1948) - Coronel Carotte
- La muralla feliz (1948) - Ladrón
- Campo Bravo (1948)
- Doce horas de vida (1949) - Raúl
- Catalina de Inglaterra (1951) - Enrique VIII
- María Morena (1951) - Cristóbal
- The Pelegrín System (1952) - Bremón (padre)
- Em-Nar, la ciudad de fuego (1952) - Comandante Balboa
- Amaya (1952) - Eudonio
- Court of Justice (1953)
- Magic Concert (1953)
- Sucedió en mi aldea (1956) - Colás
- El fenómeno (1956) - Gregorio
- Miguitas y el carbonero (1956)
- Mensajeros de paz (1957) - Gaspar
- Aquellos tiempos del cuplé (1958) - Julio Olvedo
- Gli zitelloni (1958)
- Die Sklavenkarawane (1958) - Murad Ibrahim
- Patio andalu (1958)
- The Thieves (1959) - Zio di Vincenzo
- Noi siamo due evasi (1959) - Pietrone
- Der Löwe von Babylon (1959) - Säfir
- Legions of the Nile (1960) - (uncredited)
- Un hecho violento (1960) - Harris
- Ursus (1961) - Mok
- El secreto de los hombres azules (1961) - Don Pedro
- King of Kings (1961) - Simon of Cyrene
- Rosa de Lima (1961) - Adrián
- Historia de un hombre (1961)
- Terrible Sheriff (1962) - Tornado
- La pandilla de los once (1963) - El Coco
- El camino (1963) - El Herrero
- Backfire (1964) - Le Borgne (uncredited)
- El señor de La Salle (1964) - Tabernero
- The Uninhibited (1965) - Pablo
- Two Thousand Dollars for Coyote (1966) - White Feather (uncredited)
- Un hombre solo (1969)
- The Corruption of Chris Miller (1973) - Commissioner (voice, uncredited)
- La tribu de los aurones (1988) - Maestro Jonc (voice) (final film role)

== Bibliography ==
- Mira, Alberto. The Cinema of Spain and Portugal. Wallflower Press, 2005.
