= Magic Concert =

1953 film by Rafael J. Salvia

- Directed by: Rafael J. Salvia
- Written by: Rafael J. Salvia
- Starring: José María Rodero; Mercedes Monterrey
- Cinematography: Federico G. Larraya
- Edited by: Antonio Cánovas
- Music by: Ricardo Lamotte de Grignón
- Production company: Atlante Films
- Distributed by: Rey Soria y Cía
- Release date: 26 October 1953
- Running time: 93 minutes
- Country: Spain
- Language: Spanish

Magic Concert (Spanish: Concierto mágico) is a 1953 Spanish musical film directed by Rafael J. Salvia and starring José María Rodero and Mercedes Monterrey.

== Synopsis ==
The musician Andrés Vidal composes a concert that seems to provoke a series of tragedies, until he meets Felisa, the goddaughter of his uncle Antonio de el.

== Cast ==
- José Calvo
- Rafael Luis Calvo
- Joan Capri
- Ramón de Larrocha
- Fortunato García
- Luis Induni
- Juan Monfort
- Mercedes Monterrey
- Consuelo de Nieva
- Antonio Picazo
- Juan Pich Santasusana
- Leopoldo Querol
- Elvira Quintillá
- José María Rodero

== Bibliography ==
- Francesc Llinàs. Directores de fotografía del cine español. Filmoteca Española, 1989.
