= Maria Gustafsson (writer) =

Swedish actress and writer (1946–2025)

- Born: 1946; Boden, Sweden
- Died: 23 March 2025 (aged 78); Stockholm, Sweden
- Spouse: Miguel Lluch

Maria Gustafsson (1946 – 23 March 2025), also known as Britt, was a Swedish actress, television producer and author who worked in Spain from the 1960s to the 1990s.

== Background ==
Gustafsson was born in Boden, Sweden in 1946.

She was married to Spanish director Miguel Lluch, with whom she had two children.

Gustafsson died in Stockholm on 23 March 2025, at the age of 78.

== Career ==
Gustafsson moved to Spain in the late 1960s to pursue an acting career. She returned to Sweden in the 1990s.

=== Acting ===
Gustafsson's early career as a model and actress culminated with the popular Spanish quiz show, Un, dos, tres... responda otra vez in 1972 and 1973. She also had minor roles in several films in the late 1960s and early 1970s.

=== Television production ===
After studying TV Direction and Production at New York University Gustafsson worked on Barrio Sésamo, the Spanish co-production of Sesame Street, and was the International Coordinator of 3, 2, 1 Contact, both coproduced with Children's Television Workshop. She was a screenwriter for Lápices de Colores (1986) and Dinamo (1986), a youth TV program showing pop/rock musicians doing extreme sports, broadcast by TVE. Later, she became Program Director at Canal 10, the first private TV channel in Spain.

As Manager and Executive Producer at The Missing Piece, she produced the long-running series Apaños and Viejos oficios for the different autonomous TV channels in Spain and co-produced the youth series Torch with BBC and Czechoslovak TV, and Griot, a documentary series shot entirely in Senegal and the Ivory Coast.

== Writing ==
Gustafsson published five books: the trilogy about Klara Andersson, a Swedish interpreter recruited by the Military Secret Service, Den vidunderliga utsikten, Huset på Carrera 10 and Absintängeln (2013). She participated in an anthology, Liv och död i Stockholm, and co-authored a novel under a pseudonym.

== Filmography ==
Acting roles
Year	Film	Role	Ref
1968	A Sky Full of Stars for a Roof		
1969	Blood in the Bullring		
1969	Cemetery Without Crosses		
1970	No desearás al vecino del quinto		
	La última señora Anderson		
	Crónicas de un pueblo		
	El niño y el potro		

Behind the scenes work
Year	Work	Role	Ref
1986	Lápices de Colores	Screenwriter	
1986	Dinamo (TVE)	Screenwriter	
