= The Locket (1970 film) =

- Theatrical film poster
- Spanish: El relicario
- Directed by: Rafael Gil
- Written by: Rafael J. Salvia
- Starring: Carmen Sevilla; Arturo Fernández; Manolo Gómez Bur
- Cinematography: José F. Aguayo
- Edited by: José Luis Matesanz
- Music by: José Padilla; Manuel Parada
- Production company: Coral Producciones Cinematográficas
- Distributed by: Paramount Films de España
- Release date: 29 March 1970
- Running time: 87 minutes
- Country: Spain
- Language: Spanish

The Locket (Spanish: El relicario) is a 1970 Spanish drama film directed by Rafael Gil and starring Carmen Sevilla, Arturo Fernández and Manolo Gómez Bur.

== Cast ==
- Carmen Sevilla as Virginia / Soledad
- Arturo Fernández as Alejandro
- Manolo Gómez Bur as Aquiles Lombardo
- Miguel Mateo 'Miguelín' as Luis Lucena / Manuel Lucena
- Amparo Martí
- Francisco Piquer
- Venancio Muro as Taxista
- Alberto Fernández as El Gordo
- Alfredo Santacruz
- Jesús Guzmán as Curro
- Rafael Hernández as Chauffeur
- Antonio Díaz Cañabate
- Jesús Tordesillas
- Matías Prats
- Rafael Alonso as Dr. Alonso
- Tomás Blanco
