= Thirty Nine Love Letters =

1950 film

- Directed by: Francisco Rovira Beleta
- Written by: Carlos Blanco
- Starring: Irasema Dilián; Ángel Picazo; Tony Leblanc
- Cinematography: Ricardo Torres
- Music by: Manuel Parada
- Production company: Espiral Films
- Distributed by: Asdrúbal
- Release date: 27 July 1950
- Running time: 80 minutes
- Country: Spain
- Language: Spanish

Thirty Nine Love Letters (Spanish: 39 cartas de amor) is a 1950 Spanish romantic comedy film directed by Francisco Rovira Beleta and starring Irasema Dilián, Ángel Picazo and Tony Leblanc.

== Synopsis ==
In turn of the century Madrid, Julieta and Alberto are a couple who remain devoted to each other after several years of marriage. He begins to write her love letters under the name Count of Rocambole, but she mistakenly believes that it is a separate man sending her these messages.

== Cast ==
- Irasema Dilián as Julieta
- Ángel Picazo as Alberto
- Tony Leblanc as Max
- Carlota Bilbao as Isabel
- Mirian Kleckowa as Baronesa
- Gustavo Re as Barón
- Antonio Riquelme as David
- Roberto Font as Zacarías
- Julia Caba Alba as Portera

== Bibliography ==
- Del Amo, Alvaro. Comedia cinematográfica española. Cuadernos para el Diálogo, 1975.
- Gasca, Luis. Un siglo de cine español. Planeta, 1998.
