= Congress in Seville =

- Theatrical film poster
- Spanish: Congreso en Sevilla
- Directed by: Antonio Román
- Written by: José Luis Colina; José Santugini; Pedro de Juan; Antonio Román; Antonio de Lara; José María Pemán; Francisco Bonmatí de Codecido
- Produced by: Luis Marquina
- Starring: Carmen Sevilla; Fernando Fernán Gómez; Manolo Morán
- Cinematography: Cecilio Paniagua
- Edited by: Magdalena Pulido
- Music by: Juan Quintero
- Production company: Producciones DIA
- Distributed by: Cifesa
- Release date: 3 September 1955
- Running time: 85 minutes
- Country: Spain
- Language: Spanish

Congress in Seville (Spanish: Congreso en Sevilla) is a 1955 Spanish musical film directed by Antonio Román and starring Carmen Sevilla, Fernando Fernán Gómez and Manolo Morán.

It was shot at CEA Studios in Madrid and on location in Seville. The film's sets were designed by the art director Enrique Alarcón.

== Plot ==
After their business in Seville goes bankrupt, Carmen and Paco emigrate to Stockholm, where, while penniless, they must somehow get by before returning to their homeland. While in Sweden, Carmen finds a job as a dancer while Paco manages to return to Seville. Meanwhile, Carmen gets into a fight on her job and is let go. Having some spare cash, she visits the hospital where she gets a plane ticket from Dr. Petersen, a physician who has been invited to a Medical Congress in Seville. Dressed up as him, she tries to make it to Seville, but on the plane and at the airport she meets various congressmen and comedy ensues.

== Cast ==
- Carmen Sevilla as Carmen Fuentes
- Fernando Fernán Gómez as Dr. Guillermo Kroll
- Manolo Morán as Paco Domínguez
- Fernando Nogueras as Méndez López
- Nicolás D. Perchicot as Chamarilero
- Manolo Gómez Bur as Señor raro
- Gustavo Re as Director of Radio AGA
- Miguel Gómez as Taxi driver
- Teófilo Palou as Dr. Massuto
- Juan Cortés as owner of the winery
- Domingo Rivas as Dr. Van Blucker
- Aníbal Vela as Martín Hidalgo
- José Isbert as Señor deaf and clueless
- Carlos Casaravilla as Dr. Sergio Radowsky
- Katie Rolfsen as Dra. Martha Petersen
- Mariano Alcón as Dr. Thomas
