= Culpable (disambiguation) =

Being culpable, also known as culpability, is a measure of the degree to which an agent can be held morally or legally responsible for action and inaction.

Culpable may also refer to:

- "Culpable", 2010 song by Mexican singer Belinda Peregrín
- "Culpable" (song), 2022 song by American singer Romeo Santos with Dominican rapper Lápiz Conciente
- Culpable (film), 1960 Argentine film
- Culpable (podcast), 2019 podcast hosted by Dennis Cooper

== See also ==
- Culpables (disambiguation)
- Culprit (disambiguation)
