= No es bueno que el hombre esté solo =

1973 film

- Directed by: Pedro Olea
- Screenplay by: José Luis Garci; José Luis Martínez Mollá
- Story by: Pedro Olea
- Based on: José Truchado
- Produced by: Luis Méndez
- Starring: Carmen Sevilla; José Luis López Vázquez
- Cinematography: Antonio L. Ballesteros
- Edited by: Maruja Soriano
- Music by: Alfonso Santisteban
- Production company: Lotus Films
- Release date: May 10, 1973
- Running time: 88 min

No es bueno que el hombre esté solo is a 1973 Spanish drama film directed by Pedro Olea. Its music was composed by Alfonso G. Santisteban.

== Synopsis ==
Martín is a tormented and lonely man who keeps a shameful secret: he lives with a doll as if it were his wife. This idyllic loving existence will be seriously complicated when a prostitute, his daughter and later her pimp enter his life.

== Cast ==
- Carmen Sevilla as Lina
- José Luis López Vázquez as Martín
- Máximo Valverde as Mauro
- Eduardo Fajardo as Don Alfonso
- José Franco as Dario
- Helga Liné as Mónica
- Lolita Merino as Cati
- Raquel Rodrigo as Mujer de club
- Betsabé Ruiz as Chica de club
- Enrique Ferpi as Cliente de club
- José Riesgo as Agente
- Ángel Menéndez as Ingeniero
