= A Room for Three =

1952 film by Antonio Lara de Gavilán

- Spanish: Habitación para tres
- Directed by: Antonio de Lara
- Written by: José González de Ubieta; Antonio de Lara
- Produced by: Eduardo Manzanos Brochero
- Starring: Carolina Giménez; Armando Moreno; Manolo Gómez Bur
- Cinematography: Segismundo Pérez de Pedro 'Segis'
- Edited by: Magdalena Pulido
- Music by: Fernando Moraleda
- Production company: Unión Films
- Distributed by: Exclusivas Floralva Distribución
- Release date: 9 June 1952
- Running time: 75 minutes
- Country: Spain
- Language: Spanish

A Room for Three (Spanish: Habitación para tres) is a 1952 Spanish comedy film directed by Antonio de Lara and starring Carolina Giménez, Armando Moreno and Manolo Gómez Bur.

== Main cast ==
- Carolina Giménez as Alicia
- Armando Moreno as Carlos
- Manolo Gómez Bur as Enriqueta
- José Luis Ozores as Felipe Mendigurría
- Manuel Arbó
- Matilde Muñoz Sampedro as Carlota - madre de Alicia
- Fernando Aguirre
- Manuel Guitián
- Antonio Riquelme hijo
- Josefina Bejarano
- Pedro Valdivieso
- Manuel Fernández Pin
- Julia Martínez as Titina
- Fernando Montijano
- Gregorio Escolar
- José Cualladó

== Bibliography ==
- Bentley, Bernard. A Companion to Spanish Cinema. Boydell & Brewer 2008.
