= La frontera de Dios =

1965 Spanish film directed by César Fernández Ardavín

- Directed by: César Fernández Ardavín
- Written by: César Fernández Ardavín; José María Pérez Lozano
- Based on: Novel by José Luis Martín Descalzo
- Cinematography: Manuel Rojas
- Edited by: Magdalena Pulido
- Music by: Regino Sainz de la Maza
- Production company: Eurofilms
- Distributed by: Cire Films
- Release date: 3 May 1965
- Running time: 83 min
- Country: Spain

La frontera de Dios is a 1965 Spanish drama film directed by César Fernández Ardavín, who wrote it along with José Luis Martín Descalzo and starring Alicia Altabella, Mercedes Barranco, Frank Braña. It is based on the novel by José Luis Martín Descalzo, which won the inaugural Premio Nadal in 1944.

== Cast ==
- Alicia Altabella
- Mercedes Barranco
- Frank Braña
- Enriqueta Carballeira
- Gonzalo Cañas
- José Marco Davó
- Rodolfo del Campo
- María Teresa Durán Dressel
- Ángel Díaz
- Julia Gutiérrez Caba
- Antonio Jiménez Escribano
- Manuel Manzaneque
- Ángeles Montenegro
- Isabel Porcel
- Pedro Rodríguez de Quevedo
- Concha Velasco
- Ángel Álvarez
- Enrique Ávila
