= Seven Dollars on the Red =

1966 film

Sette dollari sul rosso
- Directed by: Alberto Cardone, Melchiade Coletti
- Written by: Juan Cobos
- Produced by: Mario Siciliano
- Cinematography: José F. Aguayo
- Edited by: Frederick Muller; José Antonio Rojo
- Music by: Francesco De Masi
- Release date: 1966 (Italy)
- Country: Italy
- Language: Italian

Sette dollari sul rosso (released in the United States as Seven Dollars on the Red or Seven Dollars to Kill) is a 1966 Italian Spaghetti Western film directed by Alberto Cardone. It stars Anthony Steffen as the main character.

Despite the name similarity, the film is not a part of Sergio Leone's Dollars trilogy. Evidently the film was inspired by this. On release in the United States, several of the cast members and production team had their names changed for the English audience.

Some parts of the soundtrack, composed by Francesco De Masi, are featured in the videogame Red Dead Revolver.

== Cast ==
- Anthony Steffen ... Johnny Ashley
- Elisa Montés ... Sybil
- Fernando Sancho ... El Cachal / Sancho
- Roberto Miali ... Jerry
- Loredana Nusciak ... Emily
- Bruno Carotenuto ... Rosario
- José Manuel Martín ... El Gringo / Chulo
- Spartaco Conversi ... Bill
- Alfredo Varelli ... 1st Sheriff
- Gianni Manera ... Gambler
- Franco Fantasia ... Sheriff of Wishville
- Annie Giss ... Julie / Starlight
- Franco Gulà ... Walt
- Renato Terra ... Manuel
- Nino Musco... Oeste (
- Miriam Salonicco ... Oeste's Wife
- David Mancori ... Jerry as Child
- Fortunato Arena ... Prisoner
- Silvana Bacci ... Mexican Woman
- Halina Zalewska ... Mexican Woman

== Plot ==
The bandit Sancho kills the wife of Johnny Ashley, and because he cannot have a child of his own he abducts Johnny's son Jerry to raise him as his own. Jerry grows up to become an evil man who kills his fiancée Sybil when she threatens to disclose his plans for a robbery. Johnny keeps searching to find his son and avenge his wife. He crosses paths with Jerry and in turn they save the other man's life. Eventually Johnny confronts and kills Sancho. He learns about Jerry from Sancho's wife. When the son comes to avenge his "father," Johnny tries to disarm him, but Jerry is accidentally killed without learning the truth.
