= Cabaret Woman =

1974 film by Pedro Lazaga

- Directed by: Pedro Lazaga
- Written by: Juan Cobos; Pedro Lazaga; Miguel Rubio
- Starring: Carmen Sevilla; José María Rodero
- Cinematography: Antonio L. Ballesteros
- Edited by: Antonio Gimeno
- Music by: Augusto Algueró
- Production company: Aldebarán Films
- Distributed by: Sánchez Ramade
- Release date: 2 December 1974
- Running time: 97 minutes
- Country: Spain
- Language: Spanish

Cabaret Woman (Spanish: Una mujer de cabaret) is a 1974 Spanish comedy film directed by Pedro Lazaga and starring Carmen Sevilla and José María Rodero.

== Cast ==
- Carmen Sevilla as Rita Medina
- José María Rodero as Adolfo Muntaner
- Armando Calvo as Jaime
- Ágata Lys as Laura
- Mario Álex as Manolo
- Ricardo Tundidor as TV Presenter
- Luis Rico
- Alejandro de Enciso as Fernando Ramiro
- Javier de Rivera (as Javier Rivera)
- Francisco Nieto as Diego Fernández
- Rafael Vaquero
- Rafael Conesa
- Pedro Espinosa
- Antonio Ramis
- Mario Romero
- Norma Duval as Adolfo's companion (uncredited)

== Bibliography ==
- Mira, Alberto. The A to Z of Spanish Cinema. Rowman & Littlefield, 2010.
