= A Decent Adultery =

- Directed by: Rafael Gil
- Written by: Enrique Jardiel Poncela (play); Rafael J. Salvia
- Starring: Carmen Sevilla; Fernando Fernán Gómez; Manolo Gómez Bur
- Cinematography: José F. Aguayo
- Edited by: José Antonio Rojo
- Music by: Manuel Parada
- Production company: Coral Producciones Cinematográficas
- Distributed by: Paramount Films de España
- Release date: 25 August 1969
- Running time: 95 minutes
- Country: Spain
- Language: Spanish

A Decent Adultery (Spanish:Un adulterio decente) is a 1969 Spanish comedy film directed by Rafael Gil and starring Carmen Sevilla, Fernando Fernán Gómez and Manolo Gómez Bur.

== Cast ==
- Carmen Sevilla as Fernanda
- Fernando Fernán Gómez as Dr. Leopoldo Cumberri
- Manolo Gómez Bur as Melecio
- Jaime de Mora y Aragón as Eduardo Bernal
- Andrés Pajares as Federico Latorre
- José Orjas as Eladio
- Guadalupe Muñoz Sampedro as Baruti
- Matilde Muñoz Sampedro as Magdalena
- Mary Begoña as Emiliana Regueiro
- Venancio Muro as Raigoso
- María Isbert as Antonia
- Julio Riscal as Paco
- Rosa Palomar as Patro
- Manuel Alexandre as Joaquín Renovales
- Erasmo Pascual as Dr. Fernández
- Maribel Hidalgo as Margarita
- Rafael Hernández as Fermín
- Vicente Haro as Galán
- Mónica Randall as Pupé
- José Alfayate as Bartolomé Ortigueira
- Francisco Rabal as Conserje
- Rafael J. Salvia as Dr. González
- Miguel Utrillo as Doctor 3

== Bibliography ==
- Mira, Alberto. The A to Z of Spanish Cinema. Rowman & Littlefield, 2010.
