= The Man Who Wanted to Kill Himself =

El hombre que se quiso matar
- Directed by: Rafael Gil
- Written by: Luis Lucia; Wenceslao Fernández Flórez (novel and screenplay)
- Starring: Antonio Casal; Rosita Yarza
- Cinematography: Isidoro Goldberger
- Music by: José Ruiz de Azagra
- Distributed by: CIFESA
- Release date: 16 February 1942
- Running time: 80 minutes
- Country: Spain
- Language: Spanish

Man Who Wanted to Kill Himself (Spanish: El hombre que se quiso matar) is a 1942 Spanish comedy film directed by Rafael Gil and starring Antonio Casal and Rosita Yarza. It is based on a novel by Wenceslao Fernández Flórez. It was remade in 1970 by the same director.

== Premise ==
Federico Solá (Antonio Casal) is a 30 years old provincial architect who, in the same day, loses his job, his girlfriend, his located room and decides to commit suicide.

== Cast ==
- Antonio Casal as Federico Solá
- Rosita Yarza as Irene Argüelles
- Manuel Arbó as Sr. Argüelles
- Xan das Bolas as Huésped
- José Prada as Presidente círculo
- Camino Garrigó as Patrona
- Irene Mas as Juanita
- Alejandro Nolla as Fabricante
- José Acuaviva as Periodista
- Alberto López as Jorge
- Ángel Alcaraz as Bragao
- Ramón Giner as Catador (as Ramón J. Giner)
- Pedro Mascaró as Dueño del bar
- Jesús Castro Blanco as Tendero (as Castro-Blanco)
- José Palomerá as Portero fábrica
