= Cursed Mountain (film) =

- Directed by: Antonio del Amo
- Written by: Alfonso Paso; José Luis Dibildos
- Cinematography: Eloy Mella; Sebastián Perera
- Edited by: Pepita Orduna
- Music by: Jesús Romo
- Production company: Almasirio Producciones de Cinematografía
- Distributed by: Paramount Films de España
- Release date: 1954
- Running time: 95 minutes
- Country: Spain
- Language: Spanish

Cursed Mountain (Spanish: Sierra maldita) is a 1954 Spanish drama film directed by Antonio del Amo and starring Rubén Rojo, Lina Rosales and José Guardiola.

== Cast ==
- Rubén Rojo as Juan
- Lina Rosales as Cruz
- José Guardiola as Lucas
- José Sepúlveda
- Manuel Zarzo as Emilio
- Miguel Gómez
- José Latorre
- Vicente Ávila
- Mario Moreno
- Agustín Rivero
- Tomás Torres
- Rodolfo del Campo
- Blanca Suarez
- Julia Pachelo
- María Dolores Albert
- Sirio Rosado
- Luis Moreno
- Francisco Beiro
- Mariquita Najar

== Bibliography ==
- Bentley, Bernard. A Companion to Spanish Cinema. Boydell & Brewer 2008.
