= Court of Justice (film) =

1953 film

- Directed by: Joaquín Luis Romero Marchent
- Written by: José Casajuana; Joaquín Luis Romero Marchent
- Starring: Marisa de Leza; José María Rodero; Elvira Quintillá
- Cinematography: Federico G. Larraya
- Edited by: Antonio Isasi-Isasmendi
- Music by: Ricardo Lamotte de Grignón
- Production company: Atlante Films
- Distributed by: Rey Soria y Cía
- Release date: 25 January 1953
- Running time: 99 minutes
- Country: Spain
- Language: Spanish

Court of Justice (Spanish: Juzgado permanente) is a 1953 Spanish crime film directed by Joaquín Luis Romero Marchent and starring Marisa de Leza, José María Rodero and Elvira Quintillá.

== Cast ==
- Antonio Almorós
- Josep Maria Angelat
- Irene Barroso
- Rafael Luis Calvo
- Joan Capri
- Ramón de Larrocha
- Marisa de Leza
- Antonio Díaz del Castillo
- Juan Fornaguera
- Fortunato García
- Marcelino Ibero
- Luis Induni
- José Marco
- Delfín Mateu
- Juan Monfort
- Mateo Morell
- José Ortiz de Zárate
- Antonio Pares
- Antonio Picazo
- Elvira Quintillá
- Julio Riscal
- José Rivelles
- José María Rodero
- Rafael Romero Marchent
- José Santamaría

== Bibliography ==
- de España, Rafael. Directory of Spanish and Portuguese film-makers and films. Greenwood Press, 1994.
