= Ángel Picazo =

Spanish actor (1917–1998)

- Born: 1 July 1917; Murcia, Spain
- Died: 22 October 1998 (aged 81); Madrid, Spain
- Occupation: Actor
- Years active: 1947–1980

Ángel Picazo (1 July 1917 – 22 October 1998) was a Spanish film actor. He appeared in 30 films between 1947 and 1980. He was born in Murcia, Spain and died in Madrid, Spain.

== Selected filmography ==
- Thirty Nine Love Letters (1950)
- The Call of Africa (1952)
- Two Degrees of Ecuador (1953)
- An Impossible Crime (1954)
- Two Paths (1954)
- Franco, ese hombre (1964)
- That Man in Istanbul (1965)
