= Trapped in Tangiers =

- Directed by: Riccardo Freda
- Screenplay by: Alessandro Continenza; Vittoriano Petrillo; Paolo Spinolla; Riccardo Freda
- Story by: Alessandro Continenza; Vittoriano Petrillo; Paolo Spinolla; Riccardo Freda
- Produced by: Antonio Cervi
- Starring: Edmund Purdom; Geneviève Page; Gino Cervi; José Guardiola
- Cinematography: Gabor Pogany
- Edited by: Nino Baragli; Margarita de Ochoa
- Music by: Lelio Luttazi
- Production companies: Antonio Cervi Produzioni Cinematografica; Producciones Ariel; Rodas P.C.
- Distributed by: Euro International Film
- Release date: 8 November 1957
- Running time: 94 minutes
- Countries: Italy; Spain

Trapped in Tangiers (Italian: Agguato a Tangeri, Spanish: Un hombre en la red) is a 1957 spy film directed by Riccardo Freda and starring Edmund Purdom.

== Cast ==
- Edmund Purdom as John Milwood
- Geneviève Page as Mary
- Gino Cervi as Henry Bovelasco
- Amparo Rivelles as Lola
- Antonio Molino Rojo as Perez
- José Guardiola as Pistolero
- Félix Dafauce as Inspector Mathias
- Luis Peña as González

== Production ==
Freda dismissed the film later in his life, describing the film as devoid of interest and a troubled production which he blamed on producer Antonio Cervi. Freda and his crew arrived in Tangiers for location scouting, and found that the agency that was supposed to pay for their accommodations. Freda and his crew eventually left for Madrid, and after about a month of no headway being made in the production, the Spanish co-production company asked Freda if the whole film could be shot in 18 days. Freda said he could and finished the film in sixteen days. The film was entirely shot in Spain.

The film was the debut of Spanish film director Jorge Grau. Grau recalled that he was hired as a second assistant director as he spoke fluent Italian but described his job as just "chatting with the director." Grau recalled that the crew was split into two later into production with half shooting in Tangiers led by the first assistant director, and the other half which included Freda and Grau. Grau stated that Freda left for one day as his lover called him from Madrid threatening to end their relationship if he did not come to visit, which led to Grau to complete shooting. The scenes Grau filmed he described as very small, such as a car arriving at the port of Malaga and the foot pressing on an accelerator.

== Release ==
Trapped in Tangiers was released on 8 November 1957. It was distributed in Italy by Euro International Film where it grossed 168,500,000 Italian lire domestically. The film was released as Trapped in Tangiers in the United States where it was distributed by Twentieth Century Fox in 1960. This version was dubbed and shortened to 77 minutes.
