= Franco, ese hombre =

1964 film by José Luis Sáenz de Heredia

Franco, ese hombre (Franco, Ecce Homo)
- Directed by: José Luis Sáenz de Heredia
- Written by: José Luis Sáenz de Heredia and José Maria Sanchez-Silva
- Produced by: José Luis Sáenz de Heredia for Chapalo Films
- Starring: Francisco Franco
- Narrated by: Ángel Picazo
- Music by: Antón García Abril
- Release date: 1964
- Running time: 103 minutes
- Country: Spain
- Language: Spanish

Franco, ese hombre, translated into English as Franco, this man, is a 1964 documentary film by Spanish director José Luis Sáenz de Heredia. It follows the military and political career of the Spanish Head of State Francisco Franco until the 25th anniversary of the end of the Civil War. It uses diverse footage and interviews Franco's doctor in Morocco, Manuel Aznar Zubigaray, and Franco himself. It is a commemorative documentary of the 25th anniversary of Franco's victory in the Spanish Civil War.

It was produced at the instigation of the political elite of the fascist state and is largely hagiographic in nature. The film concludes with a four-minute interview with Franco.

== See also ==
- Caudillo
