= The Call of Africa =

1952 film

- Directed by: César Fernández Ardavín
- Written by: César Fernández Ardavín
- Starring: Irma Torres; Ángel Picazo; Gérard Tichy
- Cinematography: Juan Mariné
- Edited by: Magdalena Pulido
- Music by: Jesús García Leoz
- Production company: Hesperia Films
- Distributed by: Hesperia Films
- Release date: 21 May 1952
- Running time: 109 minutes
- Country: Spain
- Language: Spanish

The Call of Africa (Spanish: La llamada de África) is a 1952 Spanish war film directed by César Fernández Ardavín and starring Irma Torres, Ángel Picazo and Gérard Tichy. It is set in 1940 in Spanish Morocco. It was made at a time when Spain's dictator General Franco was trying to forge a closer relationship with the Arab states of the Middle East and the film promotes a concept of the "blood brotherhood" that links the Spanish and Moroccans.

== Synopsis ==
German agents operating out of Vichy-controlled Mauritania attempt to sabotage a strategic Spanish airstrip. The Spanish and their native Moroccan allies are able to thwart this. The film's hero a Spanish colonial army officer, enters into a relationship with a Berber princess.

== Cast ==
In alphabetical order

- Ali Beiba Uld Abidin
- Yahadid Ben Ahmed Lehbib
- Farachi Ben Emboiric
- Embarc Ben Mohamed Lamin
- Mario Berriatúa
- Tomás Blanco
- Fernando Heiko Vassel
- Tony Hernández
- José Jaspe
- José Manuel Martín
- Mayrata O'Wisiedo
- Ángel Picazo
- Gustavo Re
- Santiago Rivero
- Emilio Ruiz de Córdoba
- Gérard Tichy
- Irma Torres

== Bibliography ==
- Bentley, Bernard. A Companion to Spanish Cinema. Boydell & Brewer 2008.
- Passerini, Luisa, Labanyi, Jo & Diehl, Karen. Europe and Love in Cinema. Intellect Books, 2012.
