= Tres de la Cruz Roja =

1961 film

Tres de la Cruz Roja is a 1961 Spanish comedy film directed by Fernando Palacios and written by Vicente Coello and Pedro Masó

== Plot ==
Jacinto, Pepe and Manolo are three friends and Real Madrid supporters who are upset with the high price of tickets to Santiago Bernabeu Stadium. They pursue an offer from the Spanish Red Cross to get free access to the football matches. But once in there, they abandon their selfishness and work for the cause.

== Cast ==
- José Luis López Vázquez as Jacinto
- Tony Leblanc as Pepe
- Manolo Gómez Bur as Manolo
- Ethel Rojo as Laura
- Licia Calderón as Luchi
- Francisco Camoiras as Felipe
- Jesús Puente as Ct. Martín
