= Spanish Affair (1957 film) =

1957 film by Don Siegel, Luis Marquina

- Directed by: Don Siegel; Luis Marquina
- Written by: Richard Collins
- Produced by: Bruce Odlum
- Starring: Carmen Sevilla; Richard Kiley; José Guardiola
- Cinematography: Sam Leavitt
- Edited by: Tom McAdoo
- Music by: Daniele Amfitheatrof
- Production companies: C.E.A. Nomad; Producciones Benito Perojo
- Distributed by: Paramount Pictures
- Release date: October 25, 1957
- Running time: 93 minutes
- Countries: Spain; United States
- Language: English

Spanish Affair is a 1957 American–Spanish co-produced drama film directed by Don Siegel and Luis Marquina. It features Carmen Sevilla, Richard Kiley and José Guardiola. It was shot at the CEA Studios in Madrid. The film's sets were designed by the art directors Tambi Larsen and Hal Pereira.

== Plot ==
Merritt Blake, a young American architect, comes to Spain to close a series of commercial agreements. When he learns that he will need to convince three Spanish architects of the design which he has proposed, he insists on inviting Mari (Antonio's assistant) to function as interpreter.

They set off, first to visit the Conde de Rivera, who tells Merritt that he will support the project if his colleague in Barcelona favors the plan. Mari cautions Merritt that this is not a "done deal."

On the way to Barcelona, Mari notices that her former boyfriend is following her. She fears that he will assume she is involved inappropriately with the architect. She tries to return to Madrid, but the architect insists she continue the journey with him.

== Cast ==
- Richard Kiley as Merritt Blake
- Carmen Sevilla as Mari Zarubia
- Jose Guardiola as Antonio
- Jesús Tordesillas as Sotelo
- José Manuel Martín as Fernando
- Francisco Bernal as waiter
- Purita Vargas as Purita
- Antonio S. Amaya as Miguel
- Rafael Farina as flamenco singer

== Curiosities ==
- The film was made on location in Madrid using the same cameras and auxiliary camera equipment as Funny Face; Paramount had shipped the equipment from Los Angeles to Paris, then held it over in Europe for this production after the Fred Astaire/Audrey Hepburn project had wrapped.
- One of the cars which appears in the film is a Pegaso Z-102 Spyder.

== See also ==
- List of American films of 1957
