= Norma Duval =

Spanish vedette and actress

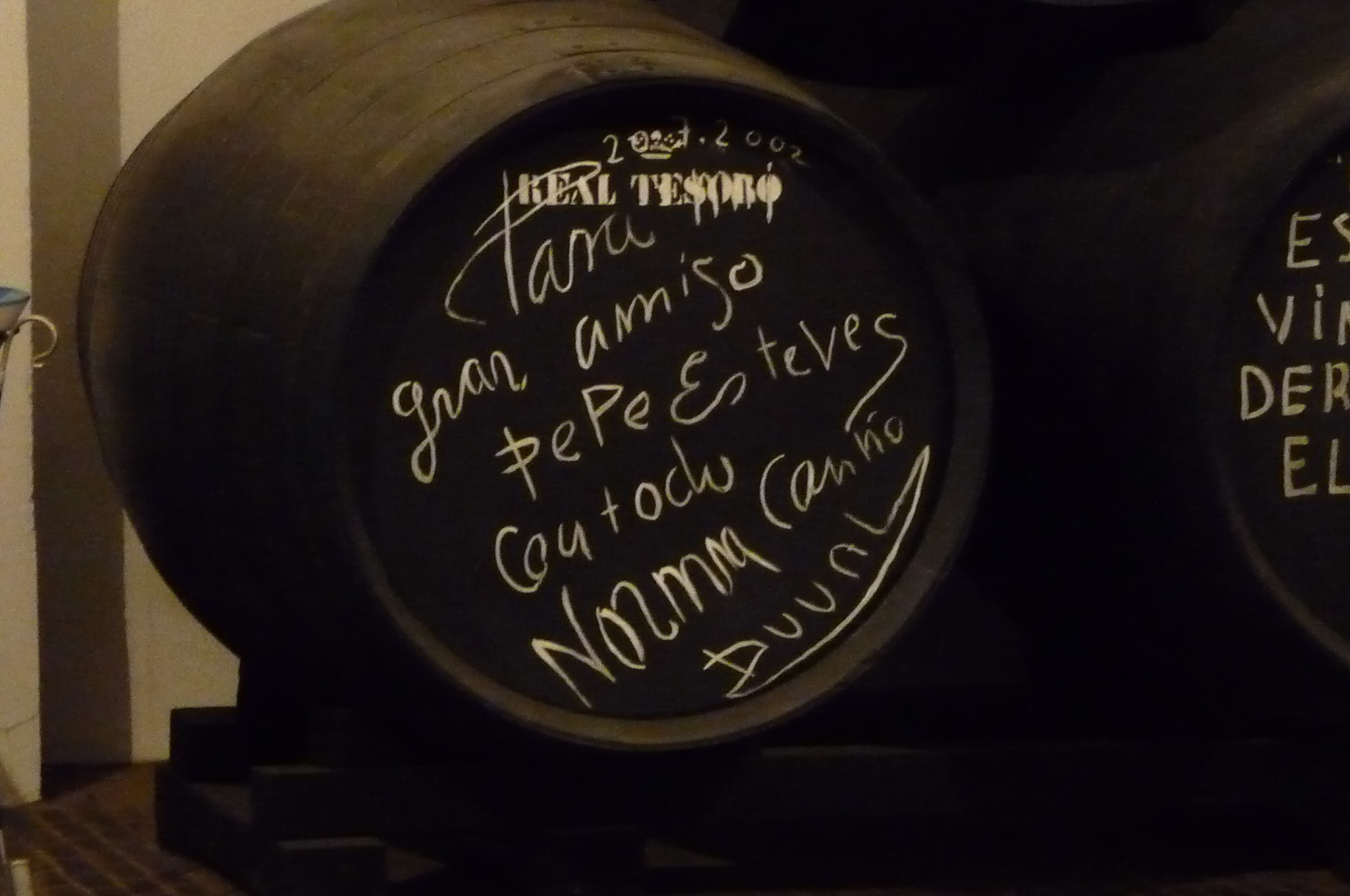
- Duval's signature in a wine barrel on Jerez
- Born: Purificación Martín Aguilera; 4 April 1956 (age 69); Barcelona, Catalonia, Spain
- Occupations: Vedette, actress, TV presenter and businesswoman
- Years active: 1973 - present

Purificación Martín Aguilera, professionally known as Norma Duval (born 4 April 1956 in Barcelona), is a Spanish vedette, actress and businesswoman.

== Life ==
Duval was born in Barcelona on April 4, 1956. Her family moved to Madrid to live a villa in the Cuatro Vientos Military Colony because of her father's profession. Duval was chosen as Miss Madrid in 1973. She was married to Marc Ostarcevic between 1992 and 2003. In 2020, she participated on the first season of Mask Singer: Adivina quién canta, under the Unicorn mask and revealing itself on the 3rd program.

== Career ==
Norma Duval made her TV debut in 1974 on ¡Señoras y señores! with other known artists in the middle as Ángela Carrasco and Victoria Vera.

She finally consecrated herself as a revue actress. In 1980, she became the first star of the centenary Parisian theater Folies Bergère, very frequented by Toulouse-Lautrec. She was the second Spaniard who managed to be the headliner of the same theater, after Bella Otero. Duval was one of the last stars of the traditional "magazine", a type of show that during those years was in decline and that was maintained mainly thanks to the tourists who visited Paris.

Once in Spain, and having become a businesswoman, Norma Duval directed and managed different shows with which she toured Spain and abroad. In Mexico and Italy, she achieved great successes. Late in the 1980s, and coinciding with the decline of uncover, she leaves the world of cinema and dedicates herself exclusively to theater and her appearances on television. She reaps important successes with the zarzuela La corte del faraón, which she performed in Valencia in 1993.

After a few years away from the stage, she premiered, in October 2000, the musical The Woman of the Year.

== Filmography ==
- Cabaret Woman 1974
