= Culpables (disambiguation) =

Culpables is a 2001 Argentine miniseries.

Culpables (English: Guilty Ones) may also refer to:

== Music ==
- "Culpables" (Karol G and Anuel AA song), 2018
- "Culpables", a song by Manuel Turizo, 2018
- Zayda y los Culpables, a 1996–2007 regional Mexican band

== Other uses ==
- Culpables (film), or Culprits, a 1960 Spanish film
- Culpables Saga, a 2017–2018 novel trilogy by Mercedes Ron

== See also ==
- Culpable (disambiguation)
