= Magdalena Pulido =

Spanish film editor

- Occupation: Film editor
- Years active: 1947–1978

Magdalena Pulido (also known as Magdalena Pulido Martín) was a prolific Spanish film editor who was active from the 1940s through the 1970s. She worked on more than 50 films, TV episodes, and TV movies over the course of her career.

== Selected filmography ==
- No matarás (1975)
- The Bell from Hell (1973)
- El caserío (1972)
- La tonta del bote (1970)
- El huésped del sevillano (1970)
- A Bullet for Sandoval (1969)
- Bohemios (1969)
- La canción del olvido (1969)
- Si muore solo una volta (1967)
- I'll Kill Him and Return Alone (1967)
- Residencia para espías (1966)
- Web of Violence (1966)
- Espionage in Lisbon (1965)
- La frontera de Dios (1965)
- El salario del crimen (1965)
- The Song of the Homesickness (1964)
- El juego de la verdad (1963)
- Confidencias de un marido (1963)
- Cerca de las estrellas (1962)
- Festival (1961)
- Compadece al delincuente (1960)
- El Lazarillo de Tormes (1959)
- Carta al cielo (1959)
- El pasado te acusa (1958)
- ...Y eligió el infierno (1957)
- Las últimas banderas (1957)
- Day of Fear (1957)
- Congreso en Sevilla (1955)
- ¿Crimen imposible? (1954)
- High Fashion (1954)
- Así es Madrid (1953)
- Amaya (1952)
- Habitación para tres (1952)
- La llamada de África (1952)
- Come Die My Love (1952)
- The Floor Burns (1952)
- Captain Poison (1951)
- Bewitched Love (1949)
- Una noche en blanco (1949)
- ¡Fuego! (1949)
- Brindis a Manolete (1948)
- La cigarra (1948)
- María Fernanda, la Jerezana (1947)
