= Day by Day (film) =

- Directed by: Antonio del Amo
- Written by: Juan Bosch; Ignacio Rubio; Antonio del Amo
- Cinematography: Juan Mariné
- Edited by: Pepita Orduna
- Music by: Jesús García Leoz
- Production company: Altamira
- Distributed by: C.B. Films
- Release date: 17 October 1951
- Running time: 90 minutes
- Country: Spain
- Language: Spanish

Day by Day (Spanish:Día tras día) is a 1951 Spanish drama film directed by Antonio del Amo. Shot in Madrid, it has certain characteristics similar to Italian neorealism.

== Plot ==
Two parishioners, Anselmo (Manuel Zarzo) and Ernesto (Mario Berriatúa), seek to straighten out their lives, and Father José (José Prada) helps them, and Luisa (Marisa de Leza), a girl, ends up in love with Ernesto.

== Cast ==
- Julio F. Alymán
- Antonio Barta
- Mario Berriatúa
- Benito Cobeña
- Nela Conjiu
- Marisa de Leza
- Manrique Gil
- Carmen Martín
- Vicente Mullor
- Elisa Méndez
- Amelia Ortas
- Pepe Ortiz
- Ofelia G. Otero
- Ramón Oteyza
- Magda Peiró
- José Prada
- Manuel Requena
- Jacinto San Emeterio
- Carmen Sánchez
- Juan Vázquez
- Manuel Zarzo
- Vicente Ávila

== Bibliography ==
- Bentley, Bernard. A Companion to Spanish Cinema. Boydell & Brewer 2008.
