= The Portico of Glory =

1953 film by Rafael J. Salvia

- Directed by: Rafael J. Salvia
- Written by: José Mojica; Rafael J. Salvia
- Starring: José Mojica; Lina Rosales; Santiago Rivero
- Cinematography: Alfredo Fraile
- Edited by: Antonio Ramírez de Loaysa
- Music by: Juan Quintero
- Production company: Suevia Films
- Distributed by: Suevia Films
- Release date: 26 October 1953
- Running time: 92 minutes
- Country: Spain
- Language: Spanish

The Portico of Glory (Spanish: El pórtico de la gloria) is a 1953 Spanish drama film directed by Rafael J. Salvia and starring José Mojica, Lina Rosales and Santiago Rivero.

== Cast ==
- José Mojica as Padre José
- Lina Rosales as Alejandra / Pilar
- Santiago Rivero as Don Marcial
- Lola Herrera as Manolita
- José Sepúlveda as Butrón
- Rosa Palomar as Doncella
- Ricardo Turia as Chófer
- Pilar Gómez Ferrer as Tía Encarna
- Mercedes Cora as Taquillera
- Aníbal Vela
- Salvador Soler Marí
- Isabel Herrera as Luz
- Delia Luna
- Joaquín Burgos
- Francisco Bernal
- Mateo Guitart
- Luis Rivera
- Paquito Amor as Felipín

== Bibliography ==
- José Luis Castro de Paz & Josetxo Cerdán. Suevia Films-Cesáreo González: treinta años de cine español. Xunta de Galicia, 2005.
