= The Falcon of the Desert =

- Directed by: Miguel Lluch
- Written by: Osvaldo Civirani
- Starring: Kirk Morris; Aldo Sambrell
- Release date: 1965
- Country: Italy
- Language: Italian

The Falcon of the Desert (Italian: La magnifica sfida, lit. 'The Magnificent Challenge') is a 1965 Italian adventure film directed by Miguel Lluch.

== Cast ==
- Kirk Morris as Kadir
- Aldo Sambrell
- Dina Loy
- Tomás Picó
- Erika Jones
- Juan Cortés
