= Manolo Gómez Bur =

Spanish actor

- Born: 21 April 1917; Madrid, Spain
- Died: 30 May 1991 (aged 74); Andalucía, Spain
- Occupation: Actor
- Years active: 1943–1983

Manolo Gómez Bur (21 April 1917 – 30 May 1991) was a Spanish actor of theatre and films. He appeared in over 90 films between 1943 and 1983. He was born in Madrid and he was soon an actor and he died in Andalucía, Spain.

== Selected filmography ==
- Un enredo de familia (1943) - Casimiro
- Es peligroso asomarse al exterior (1946)
- ¡Olé torero! (1949) - Pedestrian in Buenos Aires (uncredited)
- Cuento de hadas (1951) - Paco
- A Room for Three (1952) - Enriqueta
- Sister San Sulpicio (1952) - Daniel Suárez
- Last Day (1952) - Agente Molina
- Duelo de pasiones (1955)
- Congress in Seville (1955) - Señor raro
- Al fin solos (1955) - Loco en manicomio
- La fierecilla domada (1956) - Don Mario de Acevedo
- Don Juan (1956) - Lebourreau
- Red Cross Girls (1958) - Pepéfano
- El día de los enamorados (1959) - Mariano
- Los tramposos (1959) - Kilométrico
- Quanto sei bella Roma (1959) - Nino
- Juicio final (1960)
- Crimen para recién casados (1960) - Vigilante
- The University Chorus (1960) - Tristán Villasante
- The Showgirl (1960) - Felipe
- The Two Rivals (1960)
- Police Calling 091 (1960) - Bicho
- Festival en Benidorm (1961) - Luis Vidal
- Aquí están las vicetiples (1961) - Feliciano Recuenco
- Fantasmas en la casa (1961) - Aniceto
- El pobre García (1961) - Paco
- Tres de la Cruz Roja (1961) - Manolo
- Accidente 703 (1962) - Rogelio
- The Mustard Grain (1962) - Evelio Galindo
- You and Me Are Three (1962) - Cabo Rebollo
- Escuela de seductoras (1962) - Antonio
- Vuelve San Valentín (1962) - Antonio
- Queen of The Chantecler (1962) - Guardia (uncredited)
- You Have the Eyes of a Deadly Woman (1962)
- Los Guerrilleros (1963) - Tio Kiko
- Trampa para Catalina (1963) - Cardona
- Esa pícara pelirroja (1963) - Fernández
- La pandilla de los once (1963) - El Marconi
- La batalla del domingo (1963) - Cayetano
- The Troublemaker (1963) - Viruta
- The Daughters of Helena (1963) - Leopoldo
- Júrame (1964)
- El pecador y la bruja (1964) - Manolo
- Fin de semana (1964) - Ramírez
- ¡¡Arriba las mujeres!! (1965) - Leónidas
- Captain from Toledo (1965) - (uncredited)
- La ciudad no es para mí (1966) - Guardia
- Lola, espejo oscuro (1966) - Rodolfo
- Nuevo en esta plaza (1966) - Pepe
- Hoy como ayer (1966) - Estanislao
- Operación Secretaria (1966) - Trinidad Negrete
- El arte de casarse (1966) - Don Ramón (segment "La niña alegre")
- Amor a la española (1967) - Patricio Ruiz
- ¿Qué hacemos con los hijos? (1967) - Sr. Cotufa
- Las que tienen que servir (1967) - Lorenzo de Soto
- Los chicos con las chicas (1967) - Dn Hilario
- Los subdesarrollados (1968) - Ramón Aguirre Sacristán
- Los que tocan el piano (1968) - Don Federico Martínez Hojas 'El Tizona'
- La dinamita está servida (1968) - Campos Ramirez
- Una vez al año ser hippy no hace daño (1969) - Silvestre
- La que arman las mujeres (1969) - Sebastián
- A Decent Adultery (1969) - Melecio
- Pecados conyugales (1969) - Eulogio
- Soltera y madre en la vida (1969) - Don Ramiro
- Las panteras se comen a los ricos (1969) - Vicente
- Educando a una idiota (1969) - Bermúdez
- El señorito y las seductoras (1969) - Pablo
- The Locket (1970) - Aquiles Lombardo
- Después de los nueve meses (1970) - Antón
- ¿Por qué pecamos a los cuarenta? (1970) - Tocón
- El cronicón (1970) - Conde Sandro II el Bravo
- En un lugar de La Manga (1970) - Garralla
- El dinero tiene miedo (1970) - Agustín Pardo
- Growing Leg, Diminishing Skirt (1970) - Hombre con casco de buzo (uncredited)
- La casa de los Martínez (1971)
- Cómo casarse en 7 días (1971) - Don Porfirio Andrés
- Una chica casi decente (1971) - Marcelino Redondo
- Las ibéricas F.C. (1971) - Bernardino
- Ligue Story (1972) - Higinio Perruleti
- Dos chicas de revista (1972) - Antón Perdiguero
- Casa Flora (1973) - Atilano
- Las señoritas de mala compañía (1973) - Eloy
- Como matar a papá... sin hacerle daño (1975) - Don Arturo
- Fulanita y sus menganos (1976) - Jaime
- Pepito piscina (1978) - El conde
- Donde hay patrón... (1978) - Don Felipe
- All Is Possible in Granada (1982) - José Heredia Jiménez 'Petaca'
- Bésame, tonta (1982) - Peralta
- Cristóbal Colón, de oficio... descubridor (1982) - Cardenal Cisneros
- En busca del huevo perdido (1982)
- Juana la Loca... de vez en cuando (1983) - Cardenal Cisneros
- El Cid cabreador (1983) - Emir de Zaragoza
