= Don Juan (1956 film) =

1956 film

- Directed by: John Berry
- Written by: John Berry; Juan Antonio Bardem; Maurice Clavel; Jacques Emmanuel; Jean Manse; Jacques-Laurent Bost
- Produced by: Adry De Carbuccia; Roland Girard; Miguel Tudela; René Gaston Vuattoux
- Starring: Fernandel; Carmen Sevilla; Roland Armontel
- Cinematography: Nicolas Hayer
- Edited by: Marinette Cadix; Antonio Ramírez de Loaysa
- Music by: Henri Sauguet
- Production companies: Les Films du Cyclope; Producciones Benito Perojo; Da.Ma. Cinematografica
- Distributed by: Pathé Consortium Cinéma (France); C.E.A. Distribución (Spain)
- Release date: 9 May 1956
- Running time: 93 minutes
- Countries: France; Italy; Spain
- Language: French

Don Juan is a 1956 historical comedy film directed by John Berry and starring Fernandel, Carmen Sevilla and Roland Armontel. It was a co-production between France, Italy and Spain, based on the legend of Don Juan. The film's sets were designed by the art directors Sigfrido Burmann and Georges Wakhévitch.

== Cast ==
- Fernandel as Sganarelle
- Carmen Sevilla as Serranilla
- Erno Crisa as Don Juan
- Fernando Rey as Don Iñigo
- Roland Armontel as The Governor
- Simone Paris as Doña María
- Christine Carère as Doña Inés
- José Sepúlveda as Don Ramón
- Manolo Gómez Bur as Lebourreau
- Robert Lombard as The Duke of Altaquerque
- Micheline Dax as Doña Elvira
- Teófilo Palou as Un Guardia
- Pedro Valdivieso as Angel
- Hebe Donay as Juanita
- Mercedes Rueda as Lola
- Matilde Artero
- Luis Torrecilla
- Juan Olaguivel as El Escudero
- José María Rodríguez as Otro Guardia
- Ángel Calero as Luis
- Germaine Montero
- Antonio Riquelme
- Claudine Bleuse
- Claude May

== Bibliography ==
- Klossner, Michael. The Europe of 1500-1815 on Film and Television: A Worldwide Filmography of Over 2550 Works, 1895 Through 2000. McFarland, 2002.
