= The Curious Impertinent =

1953 film

- Directed by: Flavio Calzavara
- Written by: Miguel de Cervantes (novel); Alessandro De Stefani; Antonio Guzmán Merino; Guillen de Castro y Bellvis (play)
- Starring: Aurora Bautista; José María Seoane; Roberto Rey
- Cinematography: Ugo Lombardi
- Edited by: Margarita de Ochoa
- Music by: Emilio Lehmberg
- Production company: Valencia Films
- Distributed by: CEPICSA
- Release date: 20 April 1953
- Running time: 85 minutes
- Country: Spain
- Language: Spanish

The Curious Impertinent (Spanish: El curioso impertinente) is a 1953 Spanish historical film directed by Flavio Calzavara and starring Aurora Bautista, José María Seoane and Roberto Rey. It is based on a noteworthy story from Don Quixote by Miguel de Cervantes, extracted from his famous exemplary novels (novelas ejemplares).

== Plot ==
The film's plot revolves around the story between two friends called Lothario (britanized from Lotario) and Anselmo, and the latter's wife, Camila. Anselmo, preyed by an impertinent curiosity, asks Lotario to flirt with Camila, to prove her loyalty. At first, Camila spurns outraged the pretensions of Lotario, and Anselmo remains content about his wife's loyalty, but then convinces Lotario to keep flirting with her. Lotario and Camila finally become lovers, whereas Anselmo remains content about the loyalty of both his friend and wife, not knowing about their secret love affair. An unforeseeable circumstance reveals the truth, so Camila ends up running away from the house, and Anselmo dies writing the cause of his mourning.

== Cast ==
- Aurora Bautista as Camila
- José María Seoane as Anselmo
- Roberto Rey as Lotario
- Rosita Yarza as Leonela
- Valeriano Andrés as Jacobo
- Manuel Kayser as Cervantes
- Eduardo Fajardo as Bocaccio
- Ricardo B. Arévalo
- Encarna Paso
- Miguel Pastor
- Carlos Rufart
- Eugenia Vera

== Bibliography ==
- Klossner, Michael. The Europe of 1500-1815 on Film and Television: A Worldwide Filmography of Over 2550 Works, 1895 Through 2000. McFarland & Company, 2002.
