= Two Paths (1954 film) =

- Directed by: Arturo Ruiz Castillo
- Written by: Clemente Pamplona; José Antonio Pérez Torreblanca
- Produced by: Ángel Rosson y Rubio
- Cinematography: José F. Aguayo
- Edited by: Sara Ontañón
- Music by: José Muñoz Molleda
- Production company: Eos Films
- Distributed by: Francechs
- Release date: 1 February 1954
- Running time: 82 minutes
- Country: Spain
- Language: Spanish

Two Paths (Spanish:Dos caminos) is a 1954 Spanish drama film directed by Arturo Ruiz Castillo.

== Synopsis ==
Two friends, combatants on the Republican side, separate at the end of the civil war. Miguel goes into exile in France, and Antonio stays in Spain and works as a doctor in a rural town in the Pyrenees. The return of Miguel, after having been in a concentration camp, as a maquis will allow his reunion.

== Cast ==
- María Luisa Abad as Carmen
- Valeriano Andrés as Oficial de fronteras
- María Asquerino as Marcelle
- Joaquín Bergía as Teniente Español
- Francisco Bernal as Oficial de gendarmes
- Adriano Domínguez as Teniente Ibarra
- Manuel Guitián as Cipriano
- Fernando Heiko Vassel as Oficial alemán
- Arturo Marín as Sargento de la guardia civil
- Juanjo Menéndez as Pedro
- Pepita Monter
- Trini Moreno as Colette
- José Nieto as Comandante
- Teófilo Palou as Oficial de gendarmes
- Ángel Picazo as Antonio
- Luis Pérez de León as Don Tomás
- Inés Pérez Indarte
- Rubén Rojo as Miguel
- Enrique F. Sagaseta
- Diana Salcedo as Basilis
- José Sepúlveda as Janos
- Juan Vázquez as Padre de Marcelle

== Bibliography ==
- Bentley, Bernard. A Companion to Spanish Cinema. Boydell & Brewer 2008.
