= A Passenger Disappeared =

1953 film

- Directed by: Alejandro Perla
- Written by: Manuel Peláez; Alejandro Perla; Rafael J. Salvia
- Starring: Rafael Durán; María Rivas; Mario Berriatúa
- Cinematography: Alfonso Nieva
- Edited by: Juan Pisón
- Music by: Antonio García Cano
- Production company: Cinearte
- Distributed by: Bengala Film
- Release date: 1953
- Running time: 90 minutes
- Country: Spain
- Language: Spanish

A Passenger Disappeared (Spanish: Ha desaparecido un pasajero) is a 1953 Spanish crime film directed by Alejandro Perla and starring Rafael Durán, María Rivas and Mario Berriatúa.

== Cast ==
- Rafael Durán as Inspector Torres
- María Rivas as Régina
- Mario Berriatúa as Agente
- Ramón Elías as Gángster
- Santiago Rivero as Gángster
- Lina Yegros as La madre
- Carmen Sánchez as Ciudadana
- Valeriano Andrés
- Manuel Arbó
- Manuel Bermúdez 'Boliche'
- Xan das Bolas
- José Luis Brugada
- Joaquín Burgos
- José Castro Tallón
- Maruja Coral
- Francisco de Cossío
- Antonio de Salazar
- Beni Deus
- Antonio Ferrandis
- Eulalia Iglesias
- Milagros Leal
- Jacinto Martín
- José María Martín
- Ignacio Mateos
- José María Meana
- Manuel Monroy
- Antonio Moreno
- Julio Pelagón
- Diana Salcedo
- Otto Sirgo
- Salvador Soler Marí
- Blanca Suárez
- Aníbal Vela
- Juan Vázquez
- Pablo Álvarez Rubio

== Bibliography ==
- de España, Rafael. Directory of Spanish and Portuguese film-makers and films. Greenwood Press, 1994.
