= Sister San Sulpicio (1952 film) =

1952 film

- Directed by: Luis Lucia
- Written by: Luis Lucia; Manuel Tamayo; José Luis Colina
- Based on: Sister San Sulpicio by Armando Palacio Valdés
- Produced by: Benito Perojo
- Starring: Carmen Sevilla; Jorge Mistral; Julia Caba Alba
- Cinematography: Antonio L. Ballesteros
- Edited by: Antonio Ramírez de Loaysa
- Production company: Producciones Benito Perojo
- Distributed by: Rosa Films
- Release date: 6 October 1952
- Running time: 88 minutes
- Country: Spain
- Language: Spanish

Sister San Sulpicio (Spanish: La hermana San Sulpicio) is a 1952 Spanish comedy film directed by Luis Lucia and starring Carmen Sevilla, Jorge Mistral and Julia Caba Alba. It was the third film adaptation of Armando Palacio Valdés's 1889 novel Sister San Sulpicio.

== Plot ==
Gloria and Ceferino are two totally opposite people. He is a Galician doctor, serious and circumspect; she, on the other hand, is a beautiful Andalusian, rich and with an outgoing and dominant character. However, Gloria makes a surprising and unusual decision: to become a nun. By chance, she is assigned to a sanatorium of which Dr. Ceferino has been appointed as the new director. Love will arise between them, but they cannot marry because she is a nun.

== Cast ==
- Carmen Sevilla as Gloria Alvargonzález / Hermana San Sulpicio
- Jorge Mistral as Ceferino Sanjurjo
- Julia Caba Alba as Hermana Guadalupe
- Milagros Carrión
- Juana Ginzo
- Manuel Guitián
- Manolo Gómez Bur as Daniel Suárez
- Casimiro Hurtado
- Ana de Leyva
- Manuel Luna as D. Sabino
- Juana Mansó
- Antonio Ozores
- Antonio Riquelme
- Rosario Royo

== Critical reception ==
La hermana San Sulpicio has received mixed reviews from later scholars. The film had a substantial commercial performance, with 362,287 spectators and 4,076,608 pesetas in box-office receipts. The film received a prize from the Sindicato Nacional del Espectáculo.

== Bibliography ==
- Mira, Alberto. The A to Z of Spanish Cinema. Rowman & Littlefield, 2010.
