= Casavieja =

- municipality
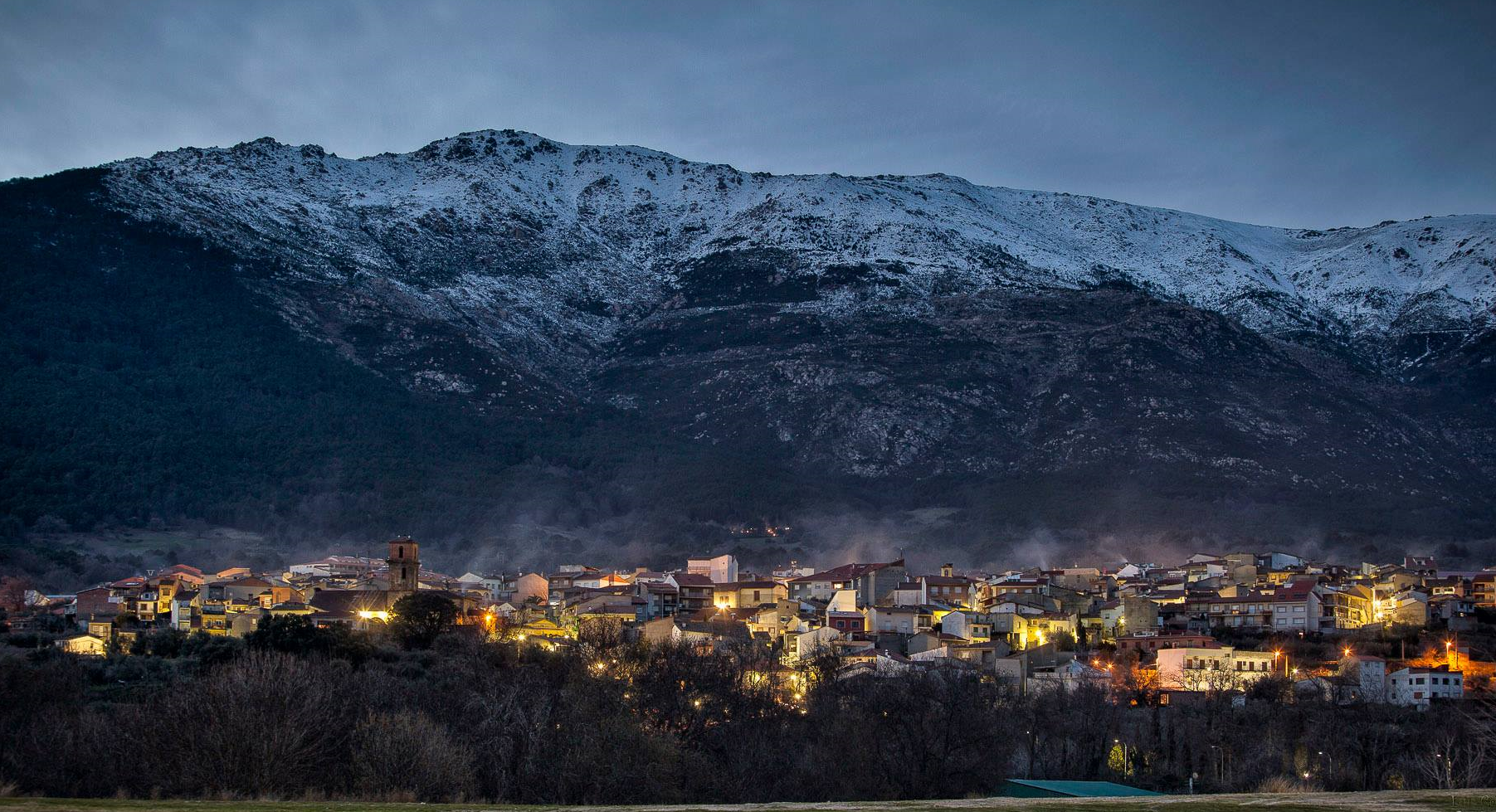
- View of Casavieja

- Flag Coat of arms

- Location in Spain. Casavieja (Spain)
- Coordinates: 40°16′52″N 4°46′00″W
- Country: Spain
- Autonomous community: Castile and León
- Province: Ávila
- Municipality: Casavieja

Area
  - Total: 39.25 km^{2} (15.15 sq mi)
- Elevation: 539 m (1,768 ft)

Population (2025-01-01)
  - Total: 1,362
  - Density: 34.70/km^{2} (89.87/sq mi)
- Time zone: UTC+1 (CET)
  - Summer (DST): UTC+2 (CEST)
- Website: Official website

Casavieja is a municipality located in the province of Ávila, Castile and León, Spain. According to the 2025 census (INE), the municipality has a population of 1,362 inhabitants.

== Population ==
Historical population
Year	Pop.	±% p.a.
2023	1,410	—
2024	1,394	−1.13%
2025	1,362	−2.30%
Source: INE
