= 100 Rifles =

1969 American Western film

- Theatrical release poster
- Directed by: Tom Gries
- Screenplay by: Clair Huffaker; Tom Gries
- Based on: The Californio; 1967 novel by Robert MacLeod
- Produced by: Marvin Schwartz
- Starring: Jim Brown; Raquel Welch; Burt Reynolds
- Cinematography: Cecilio Paniagua
- Edited by: Robert L. Simpson
- Music by: Jerry Goldsmith
- Color process: Color by DeLuxe
- Production company: Marvin Schwartz Productions
- Distributed by: 20th Century Fox
- Release date: March 26, 1969
- Running time: 110 minutes
- Country: United States
- Languages: English; Spanish
- Budget: $3,920,000
- Box office: $3.5 million (US/ Canada rentals)

100 Rifles is a 1969 American Western film directed by Tom Gries and starring Jim Brown, Raquel Welch and Burt Reynolds. It is based on Robert MacLeod's 1966 novel The Californio. The film was shot in Spain. The original music score was composed by Jerry Goldsmith, who had previously also scored Bandolero!, another Western starring Welch.

== Plot ==
In 1912 Sonora, Mexico, Arizona lawman Lyedecker chases Yaqui Joe, a half-Yaqui, half-white bank robber who has stolen $6,000. Both men are captured by the Mexican general Verdugo.

Lyedecker learns that Joe used the loot to buy 100 rifles for the Yaqui people, who are being repressed by the government. Lyedecker is not interested in Joe's motive, and intends to recover the money and apprehend Joe to further his career.

The two men escape a Mexican firing squad and flee to the hills, where they are joined by Sarita, a beautiful Indian revolutionary. Sarita has a vendetta against the soldiers, who murdered her father. The fugitives become allies. The soldiers raid and burn a village that the rebels have just left, taking its children as hostages. Sarita tells Lydecker that she will allow him to take Yaqui Joe with him back to Phoenix afterwards if he stays with them to help rescue the children. She later warms up to Lyedecker and they make love.

Leading the Yaqui against Verdugo's forces, they ambush and derail the General's train and overcome his soldiers in an extended firefight. Sarita is killed in the battle. Lyedecker decides to return home alone and allow Yaqui Joe to take over as the rebel leader.

== Cast ==
- Jim Brown as Sheriff Lyedecker
- Raquel Welch as Sarita
- Burt Reynolds as Joe "Yaqui Joe" Herrera
- Fernando Lamas as General Verdugo
- Dan O'Herlihy as Steven Grimes, the railroad rep.
- Eric Braeden (credited as Hans Gudegast) as Lieutenant Franz Von Klemme
- Michael Forest as Humara
- Aldo Sambrell as Sergeant Paletes
- Soledad Miranda as prostitute in hotel
- Alberto Dalbés as Padre Francisco (Alberto Dalbes)
- Charly Bravo as Lopez (Carlos Bravo)
- José Manuel Martín as Sarita's Father (Jose Manuel Martin)
- Akim Tamiroff as General Romero (scenes deleted)
- Sancho Gracia as Mexican Leader (uncredited)
- Lorenzo Lamas as Indian Boy (uncredited)

== Production ==
=== Development ===
The film was the first of a four-picture deal between producer Martin Schwartz and 20th Century Fox. It was based on a novel by Robert McLeod, and the script was originally written by Clair Huffaker.

Tom Gries signed to direct following his successful feature debut with Will Penny. Gries wrote two further drafts of the script himself. Huffaker later requested his name be removed from the credits and replaced with the pseudonym Cecil Hanson because "the finished product... bears absolutely no resemblance to my original script." However, Huffaker's name does appear in the film's credits.

=== Casting ===
The leads were given to Raquel Welch (Gries: "in some situations, this woman is just a piece of candy but I think she will prove in this film that she can act as well"), Jim Brown, and Burt Reynolds.

"I'd like to bring a style to the screen that means something to the cats out on the street", said Brown. "It's an image I want to portray of a strong black man in breaking down social taboos. In 100 Rifles... it's a different thing for a black man to be a lawman, get the woman and ride away into the sunset."

It was the fifth film Burt Reynolds had made in a row. The first four – Shark!, Fade In, Impasse and Whiskey Renegades – had not been released when 100 Rifles was being shot. For his role, Brown was paid a salary of $200,000 in addition to five percent of the film's box office. At the time, few black actors earned this kind of salary.

=== Filming ===
"I was playing Yaqui Joe, supposedly an Indian with a moustache", said Reynolds. "Raquel had a Spanish accent that sounded like a cross between Carmen Miranda and ZaSu Pitts. Jimmy Brown was afraid of only two things in the entire world: one was heights, the other was horses. And he was on a horse fighting me on a cliff. It just didn't work."

The film was shot in Almería, Spain in order to save money. Gries was hospitalized for three days during the shoot with typhus.

Whilst portraying a half indigenous character, Reynolds stated he played his white half as though he was from Alabama, wearing wrist bands, arm bands and "funky spurs", the latter of which would prevent him from being able to hear dialog due to their noise.

There were a number of press reports that Brown and Welch clashed during filming. Brown later said:

The thing I wanted to avoid most was any suggestion that I was coming on to her. So I withdrew. If I'd tried to socialise, we'd have had problems. You know, Raquel is married too and out of respect for her husband I wanted to deal with Raquel through him... She was so suspicious and concerned that we were there to steal something away, or something. You can get very hung up on who's going to get the close ups and so on... [Burt Reynolds] was usually a stabilising influence [between the stars]... He's a heck of a cat. He had various talks with Raquel and tried to assure her that nothing was going on, that we weren't trying to steal anything.

Welch later confirmed the tension:

It was an atmosphere. And it was really, in all seriousness, as ambiguous as hell. I don't know why it happened and I don't think Jimmy knows why it happened... My attitude on a film has always been, once it goes I'm interested only in my job. I'm not interested in asserting myself on a picture. Because it means too much to me.

"I spent the entire time refereeing fights between Jim Brown and Raquel Welch", said Reynolds. He elaborated:

It started because they were kind of attracted to each other. After a while they both displayed a little temperament, but don't forget we were out in the middle of the bloody desert with the temperature at 110. Of course, I don't think they'll ever work together again. The critics have really been knocking those two – murdering them – but as far as I know no one ever said they were Lunt and Fontanne. Jim is the most honest man I know... And Raquel – one of the gutsiest broads I know, physically. She did all her own stunts. There's also a performance in there somewhere.

Welch later said she "was the baloney in a cheesecake factory" on that film. "I wanted to keep up with all the action with the boys." She was sorry Gries "wanted to get all the sex scenes [with Jim Brown] in the can in the first day. There was no time for icing – and it made it difficult for me." She says Brown "was very forceful and I am feisty. I was a little uncomfortable with too much male aggression. But – it turned out to be great exploitation for the film, now as you look back. It broke new ground."

== Reception ==
=== Box office ===
The film opened on 26 March 1969 and grossed $301,315 in its first five days from nine cities.

According to Fox records the film required $8,225,000 in rentals to break even and by 11 December 1970 had made $6,900,000 so made a loss to the studio.

=== Critical response ===
On review aggregator Rotten Tomatoes, the film has two reviews, with an average rating of 4/10.

Quentin Tarantino said the "mediocre final product still seems like a shamefully wasted opportunity (I mean Jesus Christ, how do you fuck up a movie starring Jim Brown, Burt Reynolds and Raquel Welch?)."

== See also ==
- List of American films of 1969
