= Culprits (film) =

1960 film

- Directed by: Arturo Ruiz Castillo
- Written by: Manuel Ruiz Castillo; Arturo Ruiz Castillo
- Produced by: Ignacio Fuster hijo; Jorge Griñán; José Luis Jerez Aloza
- Starring: Anna Maria Ferrero; Fernando Rey; Lina Rosales
- Cinematography: Godofredo Pacheco; Mario Pacheco
- Edited by: Rosa G. Salgado
- Music by: Cristóbal Halffter
- Production companies: M.G. Films; Jorge Griñán, P.C.
- Distributed by: Metro-Goldwyn-Mayer Ibérica
- Release date: 27 June 1960
- Running time: 83 minutes
- Country: Spain
- Language: Spanish

Culprits (Spanish: Culpables) is a 1960 Spanish drama film directed by Arturo Ruiz Castillo and starring Anna Maria Ferrero, Fernando Rey and Lina Rosales.

== Cast ==
- Anna Maria Ferrero as Margarita
- Fernando Rey as Mario
- Lina Rosales as Mercedes
- Pastor Serrador as Ignacio
- Jacques Sernas as Emilio
- Roberto Camardiel as Antonio
- Lorenzo Robledo as Alberto
- Pilar Caballero as Susana
- Manuel Guitián as Amigo #1
- Rufino Inglés as Amigo #2

== Bibliography ==
- Francesc Sánchez Barba. Brumas del franquismo: el auge del cine negro español (1950-1965). Edicions Universitat Barcelona, 2007.
