= Two Degrees of Ecuador =

- Directed by: Ángel Vilches
- Written by: Concepción Santamaría; Enrique Teixido; Ángel Vilches
- Starring: José María Seoane; Rosita Yarza; Ángel Picazo
- Cinematography: Henri Barreyre
- Edited by: Isidro Velilla
- Music by: Jesús García Leoz; Mario Medina
- Production companies: Cetro Films; Navarra Films
- Distributed by: Peninsula Films
- Release date: 23 March 1953
- Running time: 78 minutes
- Country: Spain
- Language: Spanish

Two Degrees of Ecuador (Spanish: A dos grados del Ecuador) is a 1953 Spanish adventure film directed by Ángel Vilches and starring José María Seoane, Rosita Yarza and Ángel Picazo.

== Cast ==
- José María Seoane as Rafael Mendoza
- Rosita Yarza as Mariena
- Ángel Picazo as Fernando Martin
- Alfonso Candel as Louis Herval
- Miguel Pastor as Padre Alfonso
- Carlos Díaz de Mendoza as Fabián
- Manuel Dicenta as Captain MacHill
- Domingo del Moral as Ramirez
- Antonio García Quijada as Subgobernador
- Aníbal Vela hijo as Periodista
- Luis Llaneza as Rector
- Fernando Sala as Delegedo de kogo
- José Manuel Martín

== Bibliography ==
- Juan Francisco Cerón Gómez. Cien años de cine en Lorca. EDITUM, 1999.
