= Pedro Beltrán (actor) =

Spanish screenwriter and actor

Pedro Beltrán Rentero (20 April 1927 – 9 March 2007) was a Spanish screenwriter and actor.

He was born in Cartagena, Murcia on 20 April 1927. His father was a sales agent for Heraclio Fournieren Cartagena and a founding member of Unión Republicana. They moved to Valencia and he studied for being a dancer, actor, singer, poet, screenwriter and torero, and worked as a nurse.

He started as an actor in Bajo el cielo de España (1953), directed by Miguel Contreras Torres. He collaborated with Luis García Berlanga in Calabuch (1956), El verdugo (1963), La vaquilla (1985) and Patrimonio Nacional (1981). In 1964 he debuted as a screenwriter in El extraño viaje, directed by Fernando Fernán Gómez, ¡Bruja, más que bruja! (1977), and Mambrú se fue a la guerra (1986), for which he was nominated to the 1st Goya Awards.

He died on 9 March 2007 in Madrid at the age of 79, suffering from economic problems. His body was found by Gabino Diego.
