= Arturo Ruiz-Castillo =

Spanish screenwriter and film director

Arturo Ruiz-Castillo y Basala
- Born: 9 December 1910; Madrid, Spain
- Died: 18 June 1994 (aged 83); Madrid, Spain
- Occupations: Writer, Director
- Years active: 1936-1974

Arturo Ruiz-Castillo y Basala (9 December 1910 – 18 June 1994) was a Spanish screenwriter and film director.

== Selected filmography ==
- Devil's Roundup (1952)
- Two Paths (1954)
- Kubala (1955)

== Bibliography ==
- Bentley, Bernard. A Companion to Spanish Cinema. Boydell & Brewer 2008.
