= Licia Calderón =

Spanish Vedette

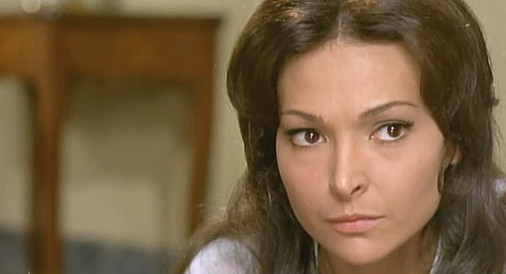
- Licia Calderon in I Want Him Dead (1968)
- Born: Alicia Palacios Calderón; 5 November 1933 (age 92); Alicante
- Occupations: Actress and vedette
- Spouse: Jesús Puente (m. 1989; died 2000)
- Children: Jesus Puente Palacios; Chesu Puente

Alicia Palacios Calderón (5 November 1933) is a Spanish actress and vedette.

She was introduced in the revue in the show Una muchachita de ochocientos años, she performed with Celia Gámez El águila de fuego, by Francis López. In the 1950s she appeared in films like El hombre que viajaba despacito, Los días de Cabirio, El hincha y Las muchachas de azul (1956).

In 1963 she appeared with Jesús Puente, Amparo Soto and Verónica Luján in the play Juegos de sociedad, by Juan José Alonso Millán. In 1982 he appeared in with Jesús Puente, Amparo Larrañaga, Fernando Arbolella and Aurora Redondo in Las tormentas no vuelven, by Santiago Moncada.

She was married to Jesús Puente, who died on 26 October 2000, and they got one daughter, Chesu, also an actress.

== Filmography ==
=== Films ===
- Dos novias para un torero (1956)
- El hombre que viajaba despacito (1957) as Marta
- Las muchachas de azul (1957) as Lolita
- Historias de Madrid (1958) as Mari Pepa
- El hincha (1958) as María Pérez, mujer de Nicolás
- La casa de la Troya (1959) as Charito 'La Mañitas'
- Tenemos 18 años (1959) as Piluca
- El Litri y su sombra (1960) as Lucía
- Tres de la Cruz Roja (1961) as Luchi
- Los pedigüeños (1961) as Alicia
- Madame (1961)
- Mi adorable esclava (1962) as Susana
- Martes y trece (1962) as Marga
- Tú y yo somos tres (1962) as Matilde
- Terrible Sheriff (1962) as Suzanne
- I Want Him Dead (1968) as Marisa
- No desearás al vecino del quinto (1970)
- Una señora llamada Andrés (1970) as Eleuxis
- Black story (La historia negra de Peter P. Peter) (1971) as Asunción
- Los días de Cabirio (1971) as Nicolasa
- Simón, contamos contigo (1971) as Comendadora
- Me debes un muerto (1971) as Candela
- Los novios de mi mujer (1972)
- La avispita Ruinasa (1983) as Srta. Alicia López
- Veredicto implacable (1987) as Mercedes
- ¡No, hija, no! (1987) as Berta (final film role)

=== TV series ===
- Sábado 64 (1965)
- Escuela de matrimonios (1967)
- Del dicho al hecho (1971) as Mari Luz
- Las doce caras de Eva (1971)
- El teatro (1978) as Mimí
- Estudio 1 (1973-1979) as Isabel / Marquesa de Fuenterría / Beth
- La comedia (1983) as Gabriela
- La comedia musical española (1985) as Deseada
- Segunda enseñanza (1986)
- La comedia dramática española (1986)
- El mar y el tiempo (1987)

=== Theatre ===
- Juegos de sociedad (1963)
- El alma se serena (1969)
- Sé infiel y no mires con quién (1972)
- Los peces rojos (1975)
- Esta noche, gran velada (1983)
- Las tormentas no vuelven (1982)
- Violines y trompetas (1978)
- Entre mujeres (1988)
