= Mario Berriatúa =

Spanish actor (1925–1970)

- Born: 30 September 1925; Madrid, Spain
- Died: 16 July 1970 (aged 44); Madrid, Spain
- Other name: Mario Berriatúa Sánchez
- Occupation: Actor
- Years active: 1941-1970 (film)

Mario Berriatúa (1925–1970) was a Spanish film actor.

== Selected filmography ==
- Mariona Rebull (1947)
- Guest of Darkness (1948)
- Neutrality (1949)
- Don Juan (1950)
- Tales of the Alhambra (1950)
- The Troublemaker (1950)
- Reckless (1951)
- Day by Day (1951)
- Our Lady of Fatima (1951)
- The Call of Africa (1952)
- The Song of Sister Maria (1952)
- The Floor Burns (1952)
- A Passenger Disappeared (1953)
- Day by Day (1954)
- High Fashion (1954)
- The Mayor of Zalamea (1954)
- Juan Simón's Daughter (1957)
- Listen To My Song (1959)
- Sonatas (1959)
- Peace Never Comes (1960)

== Bibliography ==
- Gary Allen Smith. Epic Films: Casts, Credits and Commentary on More Than 350 Historical Spectacle Movies. McFarland, 2004.
