= Marisa de Leza =

Spanish actress (1933–2020)

- Born: 9 June 1933; Madrid, Spain
- Died: 13 October 2020 (aged 87); Madrid, Spain
- Other name: María Luisa González Benés
- Occupation: Actress
- Years active: 1949–?

María Luisa González Benés, known artistically as Marisa de Leza (9 June 1933 – 13 October 2020), was a Spanish film and television actress. She died in Madrid after a long illness, aged 87.

== Partial filmography ==
- I'm Not Mata Hari (1950) - Corista (uncredited)
- Apollo Theatre (1950)
- Day by Day (1951) - Luisa
- Furrows (1951) - Tonia
- Tercio de quites (1951) - Reyes
- Court of Justice (1953) - Victoria
- Lovers of Toledo (1953) - Isabella
- Fire in the Blood (1953)
- Under the Sky of Spain (1953) - Rosario
- Flight 971 (1953) - Hija del presidente Zavala
- La patrulla (1954) - Lucía
- Alexander the Great (1956) - Eurydice
- Andalusia Express (1956) - Lola
- Between Time and Eternity (1956)
- Mi permette, babbo! (1956) - Marina Biagi
- El andén (1957) - Pilar
- The Sun Comes Out Every Day (1958) - Lina
- La frontera del miedo (1958) - Celia Dubois
- Parque de Madrid (1959) - Chica en silla de ruedas
- Diego Corrientes (1959) - Beatriz
- The Gold Suit (1960) - Carmen
- The Big Show (1960) - Rita
- La moglie di mio marito (1961) - Carla
- Cerca de las estrellas (1962) - Margarita
- Cena de matrimonios (1962) - Laura
- La gran coartada (1963) - Ana
- Una madeja de lana azul celeste (1964)
- Destino: Barajas (1965)
- La otra orilla (1965)
- Valentina (1982) - Doña Julia
- 1919, crónica del alba (1983) - Doña Julia
- Caminos de tiza (1988)
- You're the One (2000) - Madre de Julia
- Primer y último amor (2002) - Mali Boltaña
- Para que no me olvides (2005) - Leonor

== Accolades ==
Year	Award	Presented by	Film
1954	Silver Shell for Best Actress	San Sebastian International Film Festival	La patrulla

== Bibliography ==
- D'Lugo, Marvin. Guide to the Cinema of Spain. Greenwood Publishing Group, 1997.
