= Carmen Sevilla =

Spanish actress (1930–2023)

The Most Excellent Carmen Sevilla
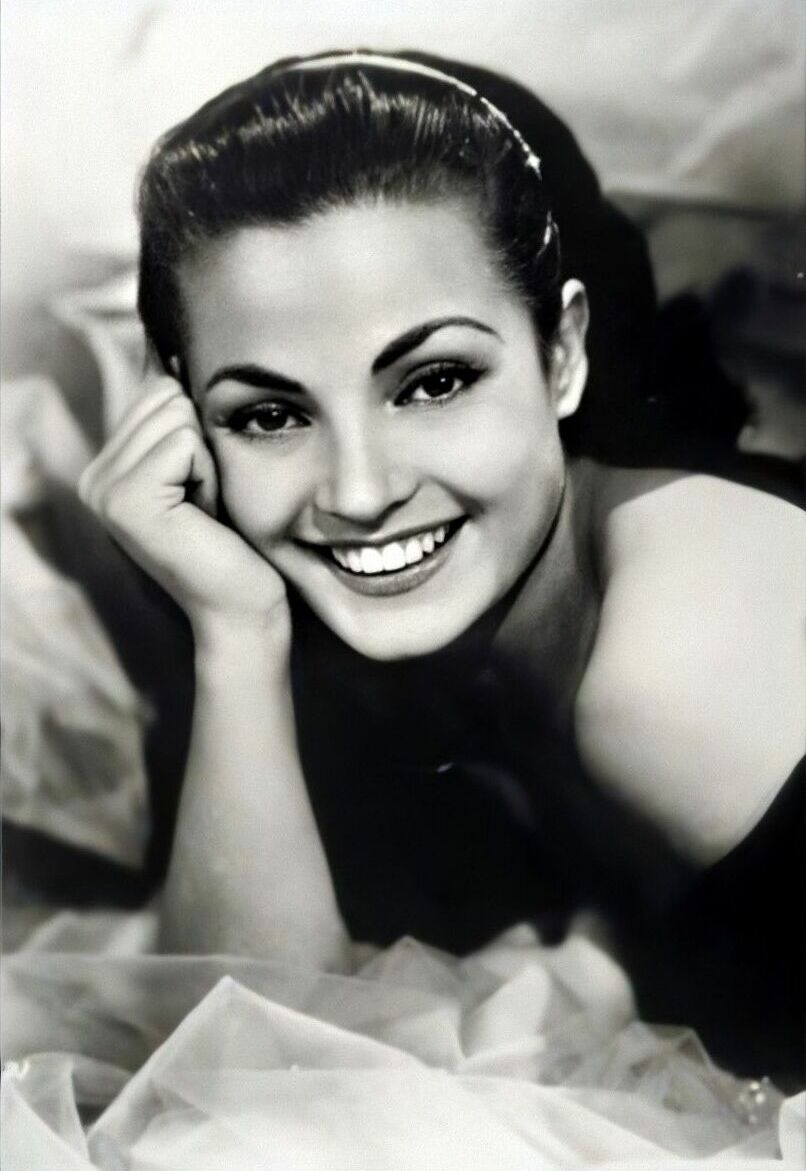
- Sevilla, c. 1955
- Born: María del Carmen García Galisteo; 16 October 1930; Seville, Spain
- Died: 27 June 2023 (aged 92); Majadahonda, Spain
- Occupations: Actress; singer; dancer; television presenter
- Years active: 1947–2010
- Spouses: Augusto Algueró (m. 1961; div. 1974) Vicente Patuel (m. 1985; died 2000)
- Children: 1

María del Carmen García Galisteo (16 October 1930 – 27 June 2023), known professionally as Carmen Sevilla, was a Spanish actress, singer, and dancer. She began her career in the 1940s and became one of the most popular and highest paid stars of Spanish cinema until the 1970s. In 1991, at the age of sixty, she began her career as a television presenter, working for the three major Spanish networks until her retirement in 2010.

As an actress, she had leading roles in numerous films, including Imperial Violets (1952), Academy Award nominee Vengeance (1958), Don Juan (1956), and Searching for Monica (1962). She also had supporting roles in English-language epic films including King of Kings (1961) and Antony and Cleopatra (1972). As a singer, she released over fifteen studio albums and numerous singles and compilations.

== Early life ==
María del Carmen García Galisteo was born in the Heliópolis neighborhood of Seville on 16 October 1930, daughter of composer Antonio García Padilla and Florentina Galisteo Ramírez, and the eldest sister of three siblings. Decades later she stated that her year of birth was 1931, as she had to add an extra year to her age to be able to work earlier and comply with labor regulations. After the Spanish Civil War, the family moved to Madrid, where her father and grandfather worked as lyricists for the films of Concha Piquer and Imperio Argentina.

As a child, Sevilla was already attracted to the performing arts and soon began to sing and dance. In fact, at the age of twelve, she went on stage for the first time with Estrellita Castro, with the show Rapsodia española, starring Paquita Rico. Castro became her artistic godmother, who met her when Carmen went to take some of her father's letters to the theater. She soon formed part of the theater companies of El Príncipe Gitano and of Paco Reyes. In the 1940s, she began her studies at the Conservatory of Music and in dance classes.

== Career ==
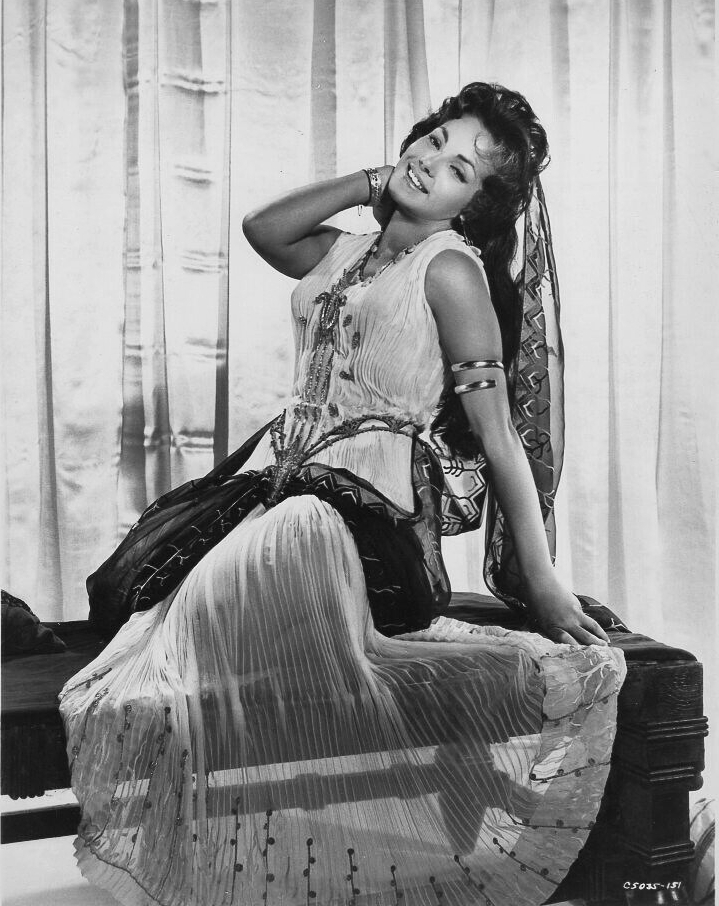
Sevilla as Mary Magdalene in a publicity photo for King of Kings (1961)

Sevilla made her film debut in 1946 with the documentary Hombres Ibéricos and with a supporting role in Serenata española in 1947. That year she participated in the Miss Spain contest. She had her first leading film role in 1948's Jalisco Sings in Seville. Her rise to fame came with her starring role in The Troublemaker (1950) with Tony Leblanc. She then became one of the most popular and highest paid stars of Spanish cinema.

In 1952, she starred in Imperial Violets along with Luis Mariano. Sevilla starred in 1958 in the Juan Antonio Bardem film Vengeance, the first Spanish film to be nominated for an Academy Award for Best Foreign Language Film. She also played Mary Magdalene in the American Nicholas Ray's epic film King of Kings (1961).

She also established herself as a singer thanks to the songs she performed in her films. She released over fifteen studio albums, with many songs composed by her then husband Augusto Algueró, including coplas, boleros, and tangos, and performed them on stage and television. On 3 January 1965, she made her first appearance on American television on The Ed Sullivan Show, where she performed live the songs "Mis noches de Madrid" and "Estando contigo", both composed by Algueró.

Thanks to her popularity, she also starred in several important advertising campaigns, including the very first Coca-Cola television commercial in Spain and the campaign for Philips household appliances where she sang a catchy flamenco-yeyé jingle.

In 1972, she played Octavia in the English-language Charlton Heston film Antony and Cleopatra. She also starred in No es bueno que el hombre esté solo (1973), Nadie oyó gritar (1973), and Beatriz (1976). She retired from acting in the late 1970s, making her last film performance in the 1978 film Rostros.

In 1991, at the age of sixty, she began a new career as a television presenter working in different shows and specials for the three major Spanish networks until her retirement in 2010. Her works as presenter include Telecupón (1991–97) on Telecinco, La noche de Carmen (1997–98) on Antena 3, and Cine de Barrio (2004–10) on Televisión Española. She also presented the broadcast of the New Year's Eve clock bell strikes live from Puerta del Sol in Madrid once on each of the three networks, being the first person to have done so on all three national networks. (Note: She hosted the welcome of 1994 on Telecinco –along with José María Íñigo–, of 1999 on Antena 3 –with Pedro Rollán–, and of 2004 on Televisión Española –with Ramón García–.)

== Personal life and death ==
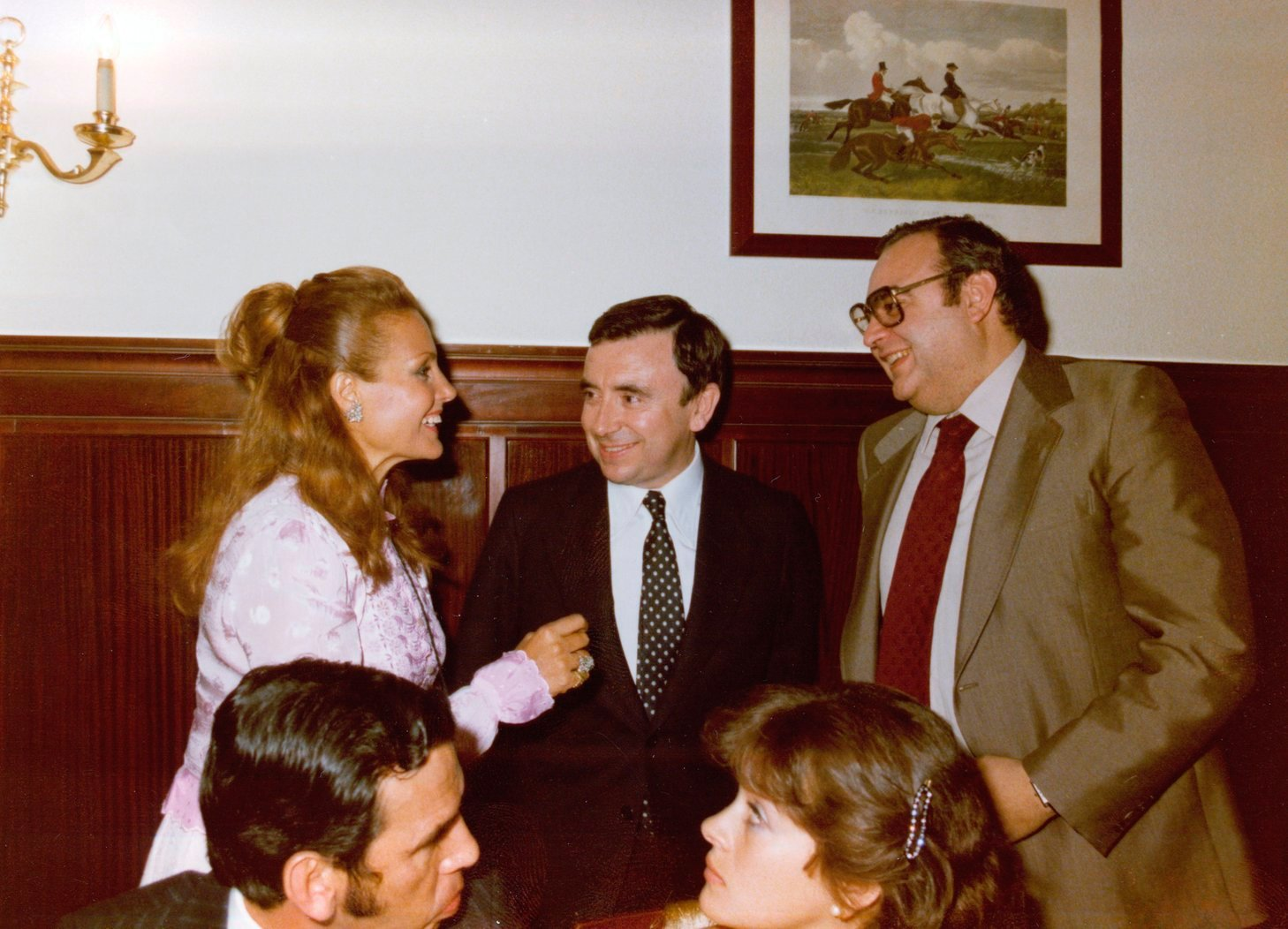
Sevilla (left) in 1979

Carmen Sevilla married composer and conductor Augusto Algueró, whom she met in 1956 during the filming of The Taming of the Shrew, on 23 February 1961 in the Zaragoza's Cathedral-Basilica of Our Lady of the Pillar. Their only son, Augusto José, was born in 1964. The couple divorced in 1974. Carmen Sevilla remarried in 1985 to Vicente Patuel, with whom she settled on a farm near Herrera del Duque until Patuel's death from a heart attack in 2000.

In 2012, she was announced to be in a "very advanced stage" of Alzheimer's disease, with which she was diagnosed three years earlier. In 2015, it was reported that she no longer recognized her home. In 2015, she went to live in a nursing home in Aravaca, Madrid. In 2022, her son announced that his mother's Alzheimer's was already at such an advanced stage that she did not recognize him and could not remember her artistic career.

On 26 June 2023, it was made public that Sevilla had been hospitalised in serious condition at the Puerta de Hierro hospital in Majadahonda (near Madrid) on 25 June 2023, where she died on 27 June from complications of Alzheimer's. She was 92.

== Selected filmography ==
- Jalisco Sings in Seville (1949) as Araceli Vargas
- The Guitar of Gardel (1949) as Carmelilla
- Tales of the Alhambra (1950) as Mariquilla
- The Troublemaker (1950) as Mari Pepa
- The Dream of Andalusia (1951) as Dolores
- Love and Desire (1951) as Lola
- Imperial Violets (1952) as Violeta
- Babes in Bagdad (1952)
- Feather in the Wind (1952) as Héléna Châtelain
- Sister San Sulpicio (1952) as Gloria Alvargonzález / Sister San Sulpicio
- The Beauty of Cadiz (1953) as Maria-Luisa
- You Had to Be a Gypsy (1953) as Pastora de los Reyes
- Reportaje (1953) as María Eugenia Bazán
- An Andalusian Gentleman (1954) as Esperanza 'Colorín'
- Congress in Seville (1955) as Carmen Fuentes
- Requiebro (1955) as Paloma Reyes
- Don Juan (1956) as Serranilla
- Desert Warrior (1957) as Princess Amina
- Spanish Affair (1957) as Mari Zarubia
- Vengeance (1958) as Andrea Díaz
- Bread, Love and Andalusia (1958) as Carmen García
- King of Kings (1961) as Mary Magdalene
- The Balcony of the Moon (1962) as Charo
- Searching for Monica (1962) as Mónica Durán
- Crucero de verano (1964) as Patricia
- Road to Rocío (1966) as Esperanza Aguilar
- The Partisan of Villa (1967) as Reyes Mendoza
- A Decent Adultery (1969) as Fernanda
- The Locket (1970) as Virginia / Soledad
- The Boldest Job in the West (1971) as Marion
- The Glass Ceiling (1971) as Marta
- Antony and Cleopatra (1972) as Octavia Minor
- La cera virgen (1972) as María
- Nadie oyó gritar (1973) as Elisa
- No es bueno que el hombre esté solo (1973) as Lina
- House of the Damned (also known as La loba y la paloma) (1974)
- Cabaret Woman (1974) as Rita Medina
- Sex o no sex (1974) as Angélica
- English Striptease (1975)
- Muerte de un quinqui (1975)
- La cruz del diablo (1975) as Maria
- Naked Therapy (1976) as Doctora Sol Esteve
- Beatriz (1976) as Carlota

== Accolades ==
=== CEC Awards ===
Year	Category	Film	Result	Ref.
1955	Best Main Actress	La fierecilla domada	Won	
1970	Best Actress	The Glass Ceiling	Won	
2003	Medal of Honour		Won	

== Honours ==
- Gold Medal of Merit in Labour (2001)
- Gold Medal of Merit in the Fine Arts (2003)
- Hija Predilecta of the Province of Seville (2007)
