= Under the Sky of Spain =

- Directed by: Miguel Contreras Torres
- Written by: Miguel Contreras Torres
- Produced by: Miguel Contreras Torres
- Starring: Gustavo Rojo; Marisa de Leza
- Cinematography: Ricardo Torrezs
- Edited by: Margarita de Ochoa
- Music by: Juan Quintero
- Production companies: Hispano Continental Films; Producciones Miguel Mezquíriz
- Distributed by: CEPICSA
- Release date: 14 December 1953
- Running time: 86 minutes
- Countries: Mexico; Spain
- Language: Spanish

Under the Sky of Spain (Spanish:Bajo el cielo de España) is a 1953 Mexican-Spanish drama film directed by Miguel Contreras Torres and starring Gustavo Rojo and Marisa de Leza.

== Cast ==
- Luis Barbán
- Pedro Beltrán
- Juana Cáceres
- Inés de Juan
- Marisa de Leza
- Carlos Díaz de Mendoza
- Miguel Gómez
- Casimiro Hurtado
- Dolores V. Hurtado
- Gabriel Llopart
- José Prada
- Enrique Ramírez
- Antonio Riquelme hijo
- Antonio Riquelme
- Julio Riscal
- Domingo Rivas
- Santiago Rivero
- Lolita Robledo
- José María Rodríguez
- Gustavo Rojo
- Lina Rosales
- Ernesto Vilches

== Bibliography ==
- Emilio García Riera. Breve historia del cine mexicano: primer siglo, 1897-1997. Instituto Mexicano de Cinematografía, 1998.
