= Miguel Lluch =

Spanish Director

- Born: 23 October 1922; Sète, Hérault, France
- Died: 19 May 2016 (aged 93); Alicante, Spain
- Occupations: Writer, Director
- Years active: 1950-1992 (film)

Miguel Lluch was a French-born Spanish art director, screenwriter and film director.

He was married to Swedish actress, TV producer and author Maria Gustafsson.

== Selected filmography ==
- Forbidden Trade (1952)
- Lawless Mountain (1953)
- Fire in the Blood (1953)
- Sister Angelica (1954)
- Anchor Button (1961)
- La magnifica sfida (1965)

== Bibliography ==
- Pitts, Michael R. Western Movies: A Guide to 5,105 Feature Films. McFarland, 2012.
