= Mercedes Monterrey =

Spanish film actress

- Born: Barcelona, Spain
- Occupation: Actress
- Years active: 1946–1982 (film)

Mercedes Monterrey was a Spanish film actress. She appeared in twenty eight films between 1946 and 1982.

== Selected filmography ==
- Magic Concert (1953)
- The Last Torch Song (1957)
- Melancholic Autumn (1958)
- The Sun Comes Out Every Day (1958)

== Bibliography ==
- Lancia, Enrico. Amedeo Nazzari. Gremese Editore, 1983.
