= Lina Rosales =

Spanish actress

- Born: Beatriz Melero Muñoz; 27 December 1928 (age 97); Madrid, Spain
- Occupation: Actress
- Years active: 1951-1970

Lina Rosales (born 27 December 1928) is a Spanish retired film and television actress.

== Selected filmography ==
- A Tale of Two Villages (1951)
- Under the Sky of Spain (1953)
- The Portico of Glory (1953)
- Cursed Mountain (1954)
- Culprits (1960)
- Per un pugno nell'occhio (1965)
- Pedrito de Andía's New Life (1965)

== Bibliography ==
- Monserrat Claveras Pérez. La Pasión de Cristo en el cine. Encuentro, 2011.
