= José Guardiola (actor) =

Spanish actor (1921–1988)

- Born: 7 December 1921; Jumilla, Murcia; Spain
- Died: 10 May 1988 (aged 66); Madrid, Spain
- Other name: José García Guardiola
- Occupation: Actor
- Years active: 1950–1987 (film)

José García Guardiola (1921–1988) was a Spanish film actor.

== Partial filmography ==
- Tales of the Alhambra (1950) - Oficial
- Furrows (1951) - Theater audience member
- Lola the Coalgirl (1952) - Gallardo
- Beauty and the Bullfighter (1954) - Manuel
- Cursed Mountain (1954) - Lucas
- Los ases buscan la paz (1955) - Yanos
- El cerco (1955) - Conrado
- The Cat (1956) - Pascual
- Desert Warrior (1957) - Kamal
- Trapped in Tangiers (1957) - Pistolero
- El hereje (1958)
- Melancholic Autumn (1958) - Giacomo
- Die Sklavenkarawane (1958) - Abu el Mot
- Toto in Madrid (1959) - José
- The Little Colonel (1960)
- Sentencia contra una mujer (1960)
- Melocotón en almíbar (1960) - Duque
- La banda de los ocho (1962)
- Dulcinea (1962) - Testigo en juicio
- Carta a una mujer (1963) - Germán Hernández 'El Asturias'
- Casablanca, Nest of Spies (1963) - Pierrot
- The Ceremony (1963) - Gate guard
- Three for a Robbery (1964)
- La boda (1964)
- Fuerte perdido (1964)
- Relevo para un pistolero (1964) - Jack Dillon
- El señor de La Salle (1964) - Carretero de Parmenia
- Hands of a Gunfighter (1965) - Johnny Castle
- Texas, Adios (1966) - McLeod
- Bridge Over the Elbe (1969) - German Commander
- A Bullet for Sandoval (1969) - Chihuahua Governor
- Transplant of a Brain (1970) - Vittorio Lamberti
- Me debes un muerto (1971) - Eusebio
- The Vampires Night Orgy (1973) - Mayor
- I Hate My Body (1974) - Sacerdote
- Tocata y fuga de Lolita (1974) - Ramiro Meana (voice, uncredited)
- Cuando los niños vienen de Marsella (1974) - Rufino Sánchez
- Leonor (1975)
- Pecado mortal (1977) - Comisario (voice, uncredited)
- El E.T.E. y el Oto (1983)
- Los santos inocentes (1984) - Señorito de la Jara
- Marbella (1985) - Patrick
- Policía (1987) - Don Ramón (final film role)
