= Rafael J. Salvia =

Spanish screenwriter

- Born: 1915; Tortosa
- Died: 21 June 1976; Madrid, Spain
- Occupations: Screenwriter; Film director
- Years active: 1950-1976

Rafael J. Salvia (1915 – 21 June 1976) was a Spanish screenwriter and film director. He wrote for 81 films between 1950 and 1976. He also directed 21 films between 1953 and 1973.

== Selected filmography ==
- The King's Mail (1951)
- Concierto mágico (1953)
- Flight 971 (1953)
- Las chicas de la Cruz Roja (1958)
- Carnival Day (1960)
- Atraco a las tres (1962)
- La gran familia (1962)
- La cesta (1965)
- Cristina Guzmán (1968)
- A Decent Adultery (1969)
- The Complete Idiot (1970)
- The Locket (1970)
- The Man Who Wanted to Kill Himself (1970)
- Una chica casi decente (1971)
- The Doubt (1972)
- The Guerrilla (1973)
- Death's Newlyweds (1975)
- The Legion Like Women (1976)
