= José María Rodero =

Spanish actor (1922–1991)

- Born: José María Rodero Luján; 26 December 1922; Madrid, Spain
- Died: 14 May 1991 (aged 68); Madrid, Spain
- Occupation: Actor
- Years active: 1945–1991
- Spouse: Elvira Quintillá (1947–1991; his death)

José María Rodero Luján (26 December 1922 – 14 May 1991) was a Spanish actor, whose career spanned over 40 years.

In 1947, he married with actress Elvira Quintillá, the couple remained together until his death in 1991 while he was preparing for the premiere of the play Hazme una noche.

== Selected filmography ==
- Unknown Path (1946)
- Anguish (1947)
- The Seventh Page (1951)
- Spanish Serenade (1952)
- La becerrada (1963)
- Cabaret Woman (1974)
