= Rosita Yarza =

Spanish actress

- Born: María Rosa Yarza Manrique; 5 November 1922; Madrid, Spain
- Died: 13 October 1996 (aged 73); Madrid, Spain
- Occupation: Actress
- Years active: 1941–1967 (film)

Rosita Yarza (5 November 1922 – 13 October 1996) was a Spanish film actress who appeared in around thirty films including The Man Who Wanted to Kill Himself (1942) in which she played the female lead.

== Selected filmography ==
- The Man Who Wanted to Kill Himself (1942)
- Malvaloca (1942)
- Mariona Rebull (1947)
- Two Degrees of Ecuador (1953)
- Alfonso XII and María Cristina (1960)
- Behind the Mask of Zorro (1966)

== Bibliography ==
- Bentley, Bernard. A Companion to Spanish Cinema. Boydell & Brewer 2008.
