= Fire in the Blood (1953 film) =

1953 film by Ignacio F. Iquino

- Spanish: Fuego en la sangre
- Directed by: Ignacio F. Iquino
- Written by: Antonio Guzmán Merino; Ignacio F. Iquino; Juan Lladó
- Produced by: Santos Alcocer; Ignacio F. Iquino
- Starring: António Vilar; Marisa de Leza
- Cinematography: Pablo Ripoll
- Edited by: Juan Pallejá
- Music by: Augusto Algueró
- Production company: IFI Producción
- Distributed by: IFISA
- Release date: 10 September 1953
- Running time: 90 minutes
- Country: Spain
- Language: Spanish

Fire in the Blood (Spanish: Fuego en la sangre) is a 1953 Spanish drama film directed by Ignacio F. Iquino and starring António Vilar and Marisa de Leza. It was made by the Barcelona-based IFI Producción.

The film's art director was Miguel Lluch.

== Synopsis ==
The film narrates the love triangle between Juan Fernando, the foreman of a ranch of wild cattle, Soledad and her fiancé. During a fight with the girl's boyfriend, Juan Fernando's wife dies of a heart attack. The madness of the man unleashes a tragedy.

== Cast ==
- Conchita Bautista
- Antonio Casas
- María Cañete
- Modesto Cid
- Marisa de Leza
- Margarita de Mayo
- Juan Gamero
- Angelita Gelán
- Igna Gil
- Luis Induni
- Rafael López Somoza
- Pepe Navarro
- Consuelo de Nieva
- Miguel Paparelli as Pulpero
- María Dolores Pradera
- António Vilar

== Awards and nominations ==
=== 1953 Cinema Writers Circle Awards ===
Year	Category	Actor	Result
1953	Best Lead Actress	Marisa de Leza	Won
