= List of Spanish films of 1951 =

A list of films produced in Spain in 1951 (see 1951 in film).

== 1951 ==
Title	Director	Cast	Genre	Notes
1951
The Black Crown	Luis Saslavsky	María Félix, Vittorio Gassman, Rossano Brazzi	Drama	Co-production with France
Black Sky	Manuel Mur Oti	Julia Caba Alba, Susana Canales, Fernando Rey	Social drama	Spanish Neorealism
Café Cantante	Antonio Momplet	Imperio Argentina	Musical	Co-production with Argentina
Captain Poison	Luis Marquina	Sara Montiel, José Isbert	Historical comedy	
A Cuban in Spain	Luis Bayón Herrera	Blanquita Amaro, Marujita Díaz	Musical	Co-production with Argentina, Cuba
Day by Day	Antonio del Amo	Mario Berriatúa, Marisa de Leza, Manuel Zarzo	Social drama	Spanish Neorealism
Dawn of America	Juan de Orduña	António Vilar, Amparo Rivelles, José Suárez	Historical	About the discovery of America by Cristóbal Colón
The Dream of Andalusia	Luis Lucia	Carmen Sevilla, Arlette Poirier	Musical	Co-production with France
The Evil Forest	Daniel Mangrané	Gustavo Rojo, Ludmilla Tchérina	Drama	Entered into the 1952 Cannes Film Festival
Fog and Sun	José María Forqué		Drama	
Furrows	José Antonio Nieves Conde	Luis Peña, María Asquerino	Social drama	Spanish Neorealism
The Girl at the Inn	Ramón Torrado	Lola Flores, Manolo Caracol	Musical	
The Great Galeoto	Rafael Gil	Ana Mariscal, Rafael Durán	Drama	
The King's Mail	Ricardo Gascón	Cesare Danova, Isabel de Pomés	Historical adventure	
The Lioness of Castille	Juan de Orduña	Alfredo Mayo, Amparo Rivelles, Alberto Romea	Historical	
Love and Desire	Henri Decoin, Luis María Delgado	Martine Carol, António Vilar, Carmen Sevilla	Drama	Co-production with France
Malibran's Song	Luis Escobar		Historical musical	
María Morena	José María Forqué, Pedro Lazaga	Paquita Rico, Francisco Rabal	Drama	Entered into the 1952 Cannes Film Festival
Messalina	Carmine Gallone	María Félix, Georges Marchal	Historical drama	
Our Lady of Fatima	Rafael Gil	Fernando Rey, Tito Junco	Drama	
Reckless	José Antonio Nieves Conde	Manolo Morán, Jesús Tordesillas	Drama	Entered into the 1951 Cannes Film Festival
The Seventh Page	Ladislao Vajda	Rafael Durán, María Asquerino, Luis Prendes	Drama	
A Tale of Two Villages	Antonio del Amo	Nani Fernández, Manolo Morán	Drama	
Vertigo	Eusebio Fernández Ardavín	Ana Mariscal, Lina Yegros	Drama	
La Virgen gitana	Ramón Torrado	Paquita Rico, Lina Yegros	Comedy	Entered into the 1951 Cannes Film Festival
