= Nobody Will Know =

1953 film by Ramón Torrado

- Directed by: Ramón Torrado
- Written by: Jacques Companéez; Enrique Llovet
- Produced by: Cesáreo González
- Starring: Fernando Fernán Gómez; Julia Martínez; Julia Caba Alba
- Cinematography: Michel Kelber
- Edited by: Gaby Peñalba
- Music by: Juan Quintero
- Production company: Suevia Films
- Distributed by: Suevia Films
- Release date: 7 December 1953
- Running time: 81 minutes
- Country: Spain
- Language: Spanish

Nobody Will Know (Spanish: Nadie lo sabrá) is a 1953 Spanish comedy film directed by Ramón Torrado and starring Fernando Fernán Gómez, Julia Martínez and Julia Caba Alba. Complications ensue when a modest bank clerk becomes caught up in an armed robbery. The film's sets were designed by the art director Sigfrido Burmann.

== Plot ==
Pedro Gutiérrez is a modest bank employee who is in financial trouble and dreams of marrying María, but she lives in a wealthy family, and he believes that she will not want to go through hardship.

One night he is working alone at the bank, he hears some suspicious noises in the safe deposit box section and arrives in time to discover some robbers who shoot him in the leg and flee, leaving a wad of $30,000 behind. Pedro sees the opportunity to change his life and keeps it in an old filing cabinet in his apartment.

The bank management congratulates him for his intervention, his salary and job category are increased, when he leaves the hospital he verifies that María is not rich nor does she want luxuries, with which they can live happily.

== Cast ==
- Manuel Alexandre as Juan, compañero de Pedro
- Manuel Arbó
- Luis Barragán
- Xan das Bolas as Cartero
- Julia Caba Alba as Dolores
- Raúl Cancio as Ladrón #1
- Julia Delgado Caro
- Fernando Fernán Gómez as Pedro Gutiérrez
- Fernando Fernández de Córdoba
- Félix Fernández as Arturo López, el sastre
- Mateo Guitart
- Mapy Gómez
- Francisco Hernández
- Julia Lajos as Doña Gertrudis
- Julia Martínez as María
- José Nieto
- Natividad Oporto
- Carlos Ramirez
- Manuel Requena
- Antonio Riquelme as Empleado de correos
- José R. Rodríguez
- Fernando Sancho as Ladrón #2
- José Sepúlveda
- Ángel Álvarez as Compañero de Pedro

== Bibliography ==
- Pedro López García. Alicantinos en el cine. Cineastas en Alicante. Editorial Club Universitario, 2013.
