= The Cheerful Caravan =

1953 film by Ramón Torrado

- Directed by: Ramón Torrado
- Written by: Serafín Adame; Pedro Lazaga; Francisco Naranjo; H.S. Valdés
- Starring: Paquita Rico; Félix Fernández
- Cinematography: Theodore J. Pahle
- Edited by: Gaby Peñalba
- Music by: Francis Lopez
- Production company: Suevia Films
- Distributed by: Suevia Films
- Release date: 2 September 1953
- Running time: 85 minutes
- Country: Spain
- Language: Spanish

The Cheerful Caravan (Spanish: La alegre caravana) is a 1953 Spanish musical comedy film directed by Ramón Torrado and starring Paquita Rico, Tito Sirgo and Félix Fernández.

== Cast ==
- Paquita Rico
- Tito Sirgo
- Félix Fernández
- José Nieto
- Manuel Arbó
- Matilde Artero
- Xan das Bolas
- Raúl Cancio
- Aurora de Alba
- Fernando Fernández de Córdoba
- Manuel Guitián
- Miguel Gómez
- Antonio Hernández
- Luis Pérez de León
- Manuel Requena
- Rosario Royo
- Fernando Sancho
- Otto Sirgo
- Maruja Vallojera

== Bibliography ==
- de España, Rafael. Directory of Spanish and Portuguese film-makers and films. Greenwood Press, 1994.
