= Condemned to Hang =

1953 film by Ladislao Vajda

- Poster
- Directed by: Ladislao Vajda
- Written by: José Santugini
- Produced by: Falco Chamartín
- Starring: Rossano Brazzi; Fosco Giachetti; Emma Penella
- Cinematography: Otello Martelli; Eloy Mella
- Edited by: Otello Colangeli; Julio Peña
- Music by: José Muñoz Molleda
- Production companies: Chamartín; Falco Film
- Distributed by: Chamartín; ENIC
- Release date: 8 October 1953
- Running time: 93 minutes
- Countries: Italy; Spain
- Language: Spanish

Condemned to Hang or Flesh for the Gallows (Spanish: Carne de horca, Italian: Il terrore dell'Andalusia) is a 1953 Italian-Spanish historical adventure film directed by Ladislao Vajda and starring Rossano Brazzi, Fosco Giachetti and Emma Penella. The film portrays the bandits of nineteenth century Andalucía. The film's art direction was by Alberto Boccianti.

== Synopsis ==
The life of the rebel and vicious Juan Pablo de Osuna changes when his father, a rich cattleman, is murdered by Lucero, a cruel bandit of The Sierra Morena.

Looking for revenge Juan Pablo is wrongfully accused and everybody believes that he is a murderer, even Lucero's gang. He becomes member of the gang and Lucero confides him. Juan Pablo discovers that a rich man from the city of Ronda gives information about the stagecoach to the bandits, in exchange of a part of the bounty. Chasing the messenger Juan Pablo finds the traitor: he is the father of his former girlfriend.

== Cast ==
- Rossano Brazzi as Juan Pablo de Osuna
- Fosco Giachetti as Lucero
- Emma Penella as Consuelo
- José Nieto as Chiclanero
- Félix Dafauce as Joaquín de las Hoces
- Francisco Arenzana as Novato
- Alessandro Fersen as Vargas
- Aldo Silvani as Padre de Flores
- Evar Maran as Flores
- Arturo Bragaglia as Párroco
- Gondrano Trucchi
- Luis Prendes as Tomás
- Fedele Gentile
- John Fostini
- Roberto Zara as Rana
- Enrico Polito
- Adriano Dominguez as Jacinto
- Juan Calvo as Lorenzo Ruiz
- Rafael Calvo
- Santiago Rivero as Oficial 2º
- Claudio Morgan
- José Isbert as Don Félix
- José Sepúlveda as Miguel
- Trinidad Heredia as Soledad
- Rafael Cortés as Risueño
- Guillermo Méndez as Tranquilo
- Ángel Córdoba as Lobato
- Antonio Ferrandis as Venancio
- Ignacio A. Caro as Tabernero
- José María Rodríguez as Pastor 1º
- José Alburquerque as Juez de ronda
- Manuel Arbó as Posadero de Utrera
- Víctor Mengele as José
- Pedro Vargas as Mocuelo
- José Villasante as Curro
- Lorenzo García as Tío Lucas
- Faustino Flores as Hombre de Zahara
- Tony Hernández as Chico de la taberna de Utrera
- Curro de Cádiz as Gitano
- Jesús Gallardo as Mendigo ciego
- Carmen Heredia as Moza de 'Los Rosales'
- Julio Ortas as Mozo de 'Los Rosales'
- Arturo Marín as Romancero
- Gino Scotti as Guarda del cortijo
- Félix Fernández as Don Fernando
- Peter Damon as Oficial 1º
- Franco Pesce as Joyero
- Raúl Cancio as Santiago

== Bibliography ==
- Mira, Alberto. Historical Dictionary of Spanish Cinema. Scarecrow Press, 2010.
