= Vicky Lagos =

Spanish film and television actress (born 1938)

- Born: 23 June 1938 (age 88); Madrid, Spain
- Other name: Aurelia Goyanes Muñoz
- Occupation: Actress
- Years active: 1957-

Vicky Lagos , born Amelia Victoria Goyanes Muñoz, is a Spanish film and television actress. She is the daughter of the actress Mimí Muñoz and the actor and director Vittorio De Sica.

== Biography ==
Granddaughter of actor Alfonso Muñoz; daughter of actress Mimí Muñoz and Vittorio De Sica, older sister of Mara, Concha, and María José Goyanes. Also sister of Pepe Goyanes. She began her artistic career in the world of revue, performing as second vedette in Celia Gámez company.

The success achieved with the play Te espero en Eslava allowed her to begin her film career with Las muchachas de azul, by Pedro Lazaga. Although her time in cinema was intense at first, it did not last beyond 1966, and her subsequent appearances have been very sporadic.

From the mid-1960s onwards, she concentrated on theater and formed her own company with her husband, fellow actor Ismael Merlo, whom she had married in 1973. They enjoyed particular success with the play El grito (The Scream).

In 1998, she returned to television to play Begoña in the series El Súper, historias de todos los días (El Súper, Everyday Stories) and in 2007 to collaborate in the series Como el perro y el gato (Like Cat and Dog), alongside Arturo Fernández Rodríguez.

She was romantically involved with actor Ismael Merlo until his death in 1984. They had one son, David.

== Selected filmography ==
- Let's Make the Impossible! (1958)
- Son of the Red Corsair (1959)
- The Song of the Nightingale (1959)
- The Big Show (1960)
- The Two Rivals (1960)
- The Wild Ones of San Gil Bridge (1966)
- The Cannibal Man (1972)

== Bibliography ==
- Peter Cowie & Derek Elley. World Filmography: 1967. Fairleigh Dickinson University Press, 1977.
