= Feather in the Wind =

1952 film

- Directed by: Louis Cuny; Ramón Torrado
- Written by: René Wheeler; Guy Decomble; Louis Cuny; Michel Duran; Enrique Llovet
- Based on: Feather in the Wind by Jean Nohain and Claude Pingault
- Produced by: Hélène Cuny; Louis Cuny; Cesáreo González; Manuel J. Goyanes; Ignace Morgenstern
- Starring: Georges Guétary; Carmen Sevilla; José Luis Ozores
- Cinematography: Manuel Berenguer; Michel Kelber
- Edited by: Pierre Jallaud; Gaby Peñalba
- Music by: Claude Pingault
- Production companies: Cocinor; Célia Films; Suevia Films
- Distributed by: Cocinor; Suevia Films
- Release date: 17 October 1952
- Running time: 85 minutes
- Countries: France; Spain
- Language: French

Feather in the Wind (French: Plume au vent, Spanish: Pluma al viento) is a 1952 French-Spanish musical comedy film directed by Louis Cuny and Ramón Torrado and starring Georges Guétary, Carmen Sevilla and José Luis Ozores. It was shot at the CEA Studios in Madrid and the Saint-Maurice Studios in Paris. The film's sets were designed by the art director Enrique Alarcón. An operetta film, it was based on the operetta of the same title by Jean Nohain and Claude Pingault.

== Cast ==
- Georges Guétary as Claude Magazelle
- Carmen Sevilla as Héléna Châtelain
- José Luis Ozores as Jean-Pierre Bouilloux
- Jacqueline Pierreux as Alicia Damours
- Félix Fernández as Peluche
- Nicole Francis as Anne-Marie Peluche
- Jean Gaven as François Bontemps
- Rosario Royo as Tía Tula Bontemps
- José Prada as Docteur Tonnoir
- Rosita Valero as Loli
- Pilar Gómez Ferrer as Eloïse
- Raoul Marco as Docteur Magazelle
- María Isbert as Maruja
- Julio Riscal as Esteban
- Manuel Requena as Paco
- Amelia Ortas as Fille grosse dans première chanson
- Carlos Díaz de Mendoza as Pharmacien rival
- Francisco Bernal as Marchand de légumes
- Diana Salcedo as Infirmière
- José Riesgo as Andres
- Antonio Ozores as Sculpteur
- José Gomis as Juan
- Mari Paz Carrero as Magdalena
- Carmen Lozano as Luisa
- Aníbal Vela hijo as Pedro
- Delia Luna as Modèle

== Bibliography ==
- Goble, Alan. The Complete Index to Literary Sources in Film. Walter de Gruyter, 1999.
- Powrie, Phil & Cadalanu, Marie. The French Film Musical. Bloomsbury Publishing, 2020.
