= Castanet (film) =

- Directed by: Ramón Torrado
- Written by: Antonio Casas Bricio; Ramón Torrado
- Cinematography: José F. Aguayo
- Edited by: Gaby Peñalba
- Music by: Genaro Monreal; Fernando Ruiz Arquelladas
- Production company: Suevia Films
- Distributed by: Suevia Films
- Release date: 23 April 1945
- Running time: 84 minutes
- Country: Spain
- Language: Spanish

Castanet (Spanish:Castañuela) is a 1945 Spanish drama film directed by Ramón Torrado.

== Cast ==
- Ricardo Acero
- Anita Bass
- Victoria Cabo
- Consuelo Companys
- Julio Rey de las Heras
- Miguel del Castillo
- Félix Fernández
- Fernando Freyre de Andrade
- Ramón Giner
- César Guzmán
- Juana Mansó
- Laura Montesol
- Conchita Sarabia
- Gracia de Triana

== Bibliography ==
- Eva Woods Peiró. White Gypsies: Race and Stardom in Spanish Musical Films. U of Minnesota Press, 2012.
