= José Riesgo =

Spanish actor (1919–2002)

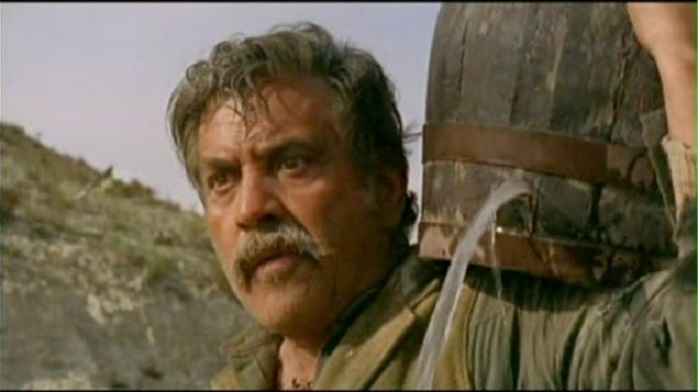
- José Riesgo in Lo voglio morto (1968)
- Born: 8 September 1919; Madrid
- Died: 16 May 2002 (aged 82)
- Occupation: Actor
- Years active: 1943-1988

José Riesgo (8 September 1919 – 16 May 2002) was a Spanish actor. After fighting in the Spanish Civil War for the Spanish Republican Army, he began acting in 1943. He played Julián in Barrio Sésamo, where he got a success and he performed the same character on plays until his retirement. He died on 16 May 2002.

== Filmography ==
=== Films ===
- Love Charm (1947) as Botones (uncredited)
- Sabela de Cambados (1949) as Amigo de Eduardo
- El santuario no se rinde (1949) as Ordenanza
- Rumbo (1950) as Federico
- Cuentos de la Alhambra (1950) as Alguacil
- La trinca del aire (1951)
- Dawn of America (1951) as Miembro del consejo
- Ronda española (1952) as Agregado
- Facultad de letras (1952) as Luis
- El cerco del diablo (1952)
- La estrella de Sierra Morena (1952)
- Feather in the Wind (1952) as Andres
- La laguna negra (1952) as Amigo de Venargas
- The Lovers of Toledo (1953)
- Welcome Mr. Marshall! (1953) as Cowboy
- Malvaloca (1954) as Trabajador de la fundición (uncredited)
- ¿Crimen imposible? (1954) as Agente
- La danza de los deseos (1954) as Periodista (uncredited)
- Felices Pascuas (1954) as Soldado en barracón
- El indiano (1955)
- Coyote (1955)
- Duelo de pasiones (1955)
- Mañana cuando amanezca (1955) as Patrullero
- Suspenso en comunismo (1956)
- The Coyote's Justice (1956)
- Miedo (1956)
- Todos somos necesarios (1956) as Soldado
- La mestiza (1956)
- Manolo guardia urbano (1956) as Cliente 1º
- Fedra, the Devil's Daughter (1956) (uncredited)
- Los maridos no cenan en casa (1957) as Obrero
- El genio alegre (1957)
- Mensajeros de paz (1957) as Organizador cabalgata
- Héroes del aire (1958) as Luis
- La venganza (1958) as Hombre 2
- El hincha (1958)
- Muchachas en vacaciones (1958) as Atracador 2º
- Villa Alegre (1958) as Pueblerino
- La vida por delante (1958) as Carbonero
- Bugles of Fear (1958) as Lugareño (uncredited)
- Ya tenemos coche (1958)
- Habanera (1958) as Kalubi
- Las locuras de Bárbara (1959)
- Bombas para la paz (1959) as Gendarme
- Échame la culpa (1959)
- Salto a la gloria (1959)
- Venta de Vargas (1959) as Guerrillero
- Azafatas con permiso (1959) as Guía turístico
- La vida alrededor (1959) as Hombre que discute en oficina de Ceferino
- S.O.S., abuelita (1959)
- En las ruinas de Babilonia (1959) as Ali (uncredited)
- El día de los enamorados (1959) as Decorador Escaparate
- Juicio final (1960)
- El amor que yo te di (1960)
- El hombre que perdió el tren (1960)
- Café de Chinitas (1960) as Amigo de Antonio
- Pasa la tuna (1960)
- Nada menos que un arkángel (1960)
- ¡Ahí va otro recluta! (1960)
- Un paso al frente (1960) as Amigo de Miguel
- La reina del Tabarín (1960) as Amigo de Arturo
- El indulto (1960)
- Un bruto para Patricia (1960) as Manolo
- Honorables sinvergüenzas (1961) as Mozo de carga
- Fray Escoba (1961)
- Rosa de Lima (1961) as Simón
- Mi adorable esclava (1962) as Diplomático
- Martes y trece (1962)
- Zorro the Avenger (1962) as Ciudadano
- Melodías de hoy (1962)
- El grano de mostaza (1962)
- The Savage Guns (1962) as Hombre de Ortega (uncredited)
- Terrible Sheriff (1962) as Fats Henchman (uncredited)
- Cupido contrabandista (1962)
- Todos eran culpables (1962) as Comandante
- Girl from La Mancha (1962) as Caballero
- Alegre juventud (1963)
- El turista (1963) as Guardia civil
- Esa pícara pelirroja (1963)
- Noches de Casablanca (1963) as Resistencia francesa (uncredited)
- Suspendido en sinvergüenza (1963)
- The Ceremony (1963) as 2nd guard
- Las hijas de Helena (1963)
- Jaguar (1963)
- Heroes of the West (1964) as Ciudadano
- La chica del gato (1964) as El Primi
- Gunfight at High Noon (1964) as Clark Walker
- Ella y el miedo (1964) as Ricardo
- La muerte silba un blues (1964)
- Four Bullets for Joe (1964) as Richard
- Hercules Against the Sons of the Sun (1964) as King Huasca
- Black Angel of the Mississippi (1964) as Chihuahua
- A Fistful of Dollars (1964) as Mexican Cavalry Captain (uncredited)
- Minnesota Clay (1964) as Ortiz Henchman (uncredited)
- Fin de semana (1964) as Fontanero #1
- Dos de la mafia (1964)
- Fistful of Knuckles (1965) as Cantinero
- El alma de la copla (1965)
- Fall of the Mohicans (1965) as Soldier
- My Gun is the Law (1965) as Davidson, Railroad Engineer
- El halcón del desierto (1965) as Omar
- Operación Póker: agente 05-14 (1965) (uncredited)
- Seven Guns for the MacGregors (1966) as Carcelero (uncredited)
- Lola, espejo oscuro (1966)
- Las últimas horas... (1966)
- Agent 3S3, Massacre in the Sun (1966)
- El mejor tesoro (1966)
- I'll Kill Him and Return Alone (1967) as Comprador de armas (uncredited)
- Operación cabaretera (1967) as Marinero de guardia 1
- 15 Scaffolds for a Murderer (1967)
- Operación Mata Hari (1968)
- El aventurero de la rosa roja (1968)
- Villa Rides (1968) as Fierro's Assistant (uncredited)
- I Want Him Dead (1968)
- One by One (1968) as Greyson's Challenger
- Shoot, Gringo... Shoot! (1968) as Bandito
- Cuidado con las señoras (1968)
- The Mercenary (1968) as Garcia's Brother (uncredited)
- Run, Psycho, Run (1968)
- O.K. Yevtushenko (1968) as Col. Stenhoff
- La querella (1968, Short)
- El jefe de estación (1968, Short)
- Forgotten Pistolero (1969) as Francisco Henchman
- La última batalla (1969, Short)
- Tristana (1970)
- La furia dei Khyber (1970) as Bowen (uncredited)
- Sabata the Killer (1970) as Poker Player #2
- Giuditta (Freunde das Leben ist lebenswert) (1970, TV Movie) as Ibrahim
- Una señora llamada Andrés (1970) as Empleado de grua municipal
- El apartamento de la tentación (1971) as Camarero
- Una chica casi decente (1971) as Dentista
- Si estás muerto, ¿por qué bailas? (1971) as McClintock
- Bad Man's River (1971)
- Frenchie King (1971) (uncredited)
- Alta tensión (1972)
- Sonny and Jed (1972) as Ranch Host (uncredited)
- Marianela (1972) as D. Manuel
- El vikingo (1972) as Empleado de la inmobiliaria
- La curiosa (1973) as Don Anselmo (as Pepe Riesgo)
- Flor de santidad (1973) as Tío Juanes
- La llamaban La Madrina (1973)
- No es bueno que el hombre esté solo (1973) as Agente
- One Billion for a Blonde (1973) as Capitán de Scotland Yard
- Lo verde empieza en los Pirineos (1973) as Señor de Tarazona
- Me has hecho perder el juicio (1973)
- Celos, amor y Mercado Común (1973)
- The Dracula Saga (1973) as Alguacil
- El chulo (1974) as Oficial de la prisión
- Señora doctor (1974) as Pascual
- I Hate My Body (1974) as Camarero
- Cinco almohadas para una noche (1974)
- Cuando los niños vienen de Marsella (1974) as Policía
- Onofre (1974) as Comisario
- Una abuelita de antes de la guerra (1975) as Don Alfredo
- Zorro (1975) as Grocer (uncredited)
- Pim, pam, pum... ¡fuego! (1975) as Jurado
- Furtivos (1975) as Salvita
- Yo soy Fulana de Tal (1975) as Dimas
- El comisario G. en el caso del cabaret (1975)
- La adúltera (1975) as Doctor Fonseca
- Los casados y la menor (1975) as Señor Borrás
- Emilia... parada y fonda (1976)
- Sábado, chica, motel ¡qué lío aquel! (1976)
- La espada negra (1976)
- El erotismo y la informática (1976)
- Ésta que lo es... (1977) as Guardia Civil (uncredited)
- La mujer es un buen negocio (1977)
- Pasión (1977)
- Marcada por los hombres (1977)
- Wifemistress (1977) as Doctor
- La isla de las vírgenes ardientes (1977)
- A Dog Called... Vengeance (1977)
- El ladrido (1977) as Manolo
- Red Gold (1977) as Médico
- Deseo carnal (1978) as Frank
- El terrorista (1978) as Don Fernando
- Venus de fuego (1978) as Encargado de la morgue
- El violador y sus mujeres a la sombra de un recuerdo (1978) as Miembro del partido
- El hijo es mío (1978)
- Madrid al desnudo (1979) as Roque
- Historia de 'S' (1979)
- 7 días de enero (1979) (uncredited)
- Encuentro en el abismo (1979)
- Gulliver (1979) as Empresario teatral
- La larga noche de los bastones blancos (1979) as Jefe estación
- Paco, el seguro (1979) as Ponte
- Las siete magníficas y audaces mujeres (1979)
- El sexo ataca (1ª jornada) (1979) as Padre del joven homosexual
- El alcalde y la política (1980)
- El canto de la cigarra (1980) as Policía
- Unos granujas decentes (1980)
- El liguero mágico (1980) as Cochero
- Terror en el tren de medianoche (1980) as Don Carmelo
- The Black Wolf (1981)
- Revenge of the Black Wolf (1981)
- El retorno del hombre lobo (1981)
- Buitres sobre la ciudad (1981)
- La leyenda del tambor (1981) as Monseñor
- Pepe, no me des tormento (1981) as Cajero del banco
- Duelo a muerte (1981)
- Buscando a Perico (1982) as Carlines
- Desenfrenos carnales (1982) as Director de la aseguradora
- Las chicas del bingo (1982) as Hombre esperando el autobús
- Las noches secretas de Lucrecia Borgia (1982)
- Cristóbal Colón, de oficio... descubridor (1982)
- Le llamaban J.R. (1982) as Director
- Sonata de estío (1982, TV Movie)
- Huevos revueltos (1982) as Miembro del consejo
- Sábado, sabadete... (1983) as Campesino (as Pepe Riesgo)
- La desconocida (1983) as Pedro (as Pepe Riesgo)
- Mi amigo el vagabundo (1984) as Mexicano #2
- Extraño matrimonio (1984)
- Operación Mantis (El exterminio del macho) (1985) as Viejo sacerdote (uncredited)

=== TV ===
- Novela (1971)
- Crónicas de un pueblo (1972-1973) as Hombre 2º / Fidel / Juez / Honorio
- Historias de Juan Español (1973)
- Los camioneros (1974)
- Escritores de hoy (1975) as Médico
- Cuentos y leyendas (1974-1976) as Oficiales Franceses / Tartanero / D. Felipe
- Curro Jiménez (1976) as Don Miguel
- Los libros (1974-1977) as Juan Fresco / Alcalde Pastrana / Conde Enrique / Antón Zotes
- Escrito en América (1979)
- La barraca (1979) as Cliente de la taberna
- Estudio 1 (1972-1981) as Don Manuel / Díaz / Larry
- España estuvo allí... (1981) as Fray Marchena
- Ramón y Cajal (1982)
- Los gozos y las sombras (1982) as Alcalde
- Las pícaras (1983) as Ganadero
- Los desastres de la guerra (1983)
- La huella del crimen (1985) as Encargado Discoteca
- Barrio Sésamo (1979-1986) as Julián / Braulio
- Lorca, muerte de un poeta (1988) (final appearance)
