= 1952 Cannes Film Festival =

- Official poster of the 5th Cannes Film Festival, an original illustration by Piva.
- Opening film: An American in Paris
- Location: Cannes, France
- Founded: 1946
- Awards: Grand Prize of the Festival: Othello; Two Cents Worth of Hope
- No. of films: 35 (In Competition)
- Festival date: 23 April 1952 – 10 May 1952
- Website: festival-cannes.com/en

Cannes Film Festival
- 1953 1951

The 5th Cannes Film Festival took place from 23 April to 10 May 1952. French author Maurice Genevoix served as jury president for the main competition.

The Grand Prize of the Festival was awarded, as the highest prize, to Othello by Orson Welles and Two Cents Worth of Hope by Renato Castellani.

The festival opened with An American in Paris by Vincente Minnelli.

== Jury ==
=== Main Competition ===
- Maurice Genevoix, French author - Jury President
- Tony Aubin, French composer
- Pierre Billon, French filmmaker
- Suzanne Borel, French diplomat
- Chapelain-Midy, French artist
- Louis Chauvet, French journalist
- Evrard De Rouvre, French producer
- Guy Desson, French MP official
- Gabrielle Dorziat, French actress
- Jean Dréville, French filmmaker
- Jacques-Pierre Frogerais, French producer
- André Lang, French journalist
- Jean Mineur, French CNCF official
- Raymond Queneau, French poet and writer
- Georges Raguis, French union official
- Charles Vildrac, French writer

== Official Selection ==
=== In Competition ===
The following feature films competed for the Grand Prize of the Festival:

English title	Original title	Director(s)	Production country
The Absentee	La Ausente	Julio Bracho	Mexico
An American in Paris (opening film)		Vincente Minnelli	United States
Cops and Robbers	Guardie e ladri	Mario Monicelli and Steno	Italy
Cry, the Beloved Country		Zoltan Korda	United Kingdom
Dead City	Νεκρή πολιτεία	Frixos Iliadis	Greece
Desires	Das Letzte Rezept	Rolf Hansen	West Germany
Detective Story		William Wyler	United States
A Devil of a Woman	Der Weibsteufel	Wolfgang Liebeneiner	Austria
Emergency Landing	Nødlanding	Arne Skouen	Norway
Encore		Harold French, Pat Jackson and Anthony Pelissier	United Kingdom
The Evil Forest	Parsifal	Daniel Mangrané and Carlos Serrano de Osma	Spain
Fanfan la Tulipe		Christian-Jaque	France, Italy
Furrows	Surcos	José Antonio Nieves Conde	Spain
The Immortal Song	Amar Bhoopali	V. Shantaram	India
María Morena		José María Forqué and Pedro Lazaga	Spain
Man in the Storm	嵐の中の母	Kiyoshi Saeki	Japan
The Medium	La medium	Gian Carlo Menotti	Italy
Mexican Bus Ride	Subida al cielo	Luis Buñuel	Mexico
Nami	波	Noboru Nakamura	Japan
A Night of Love	ليلة غرام	Ahmed Badrakhan	Egypt
No Greater Love	Herz der Welt	Harald Braun	West Germany
One Summer of Happiness	Hon dansade en sommar	Arne Mattsson	Sweden
Othello		Orson Welles	Italy, Morocco, United States
The Overcoat	Il Cappotto	Alberto Lattuada	Italy
Pasó en mi barrio		Mario Soffici	Argentina
The Smugglers' Banquet	Le Banquet des fraudeurs	Henri Storck	Belgium
Son of the Nile	ابن النيل	Youssef Chahine	Egypt
The Tale of Genji	源氏物語	Kōzaburō Yoshimura	Japan
Three Women	Trois femmes	André Michel	France
Tico-Tico no Fubá		Adolfo Celi	Brazil
Two Cents Worth of Hope	Due soldi di speranza	Renato Castellani	Italy
Umberto D.		Vittorio De Sica	Italy
Under the Thousand Lanterns	Unter den tausend Laternen	Erich Engel	France, West Germany
Viva Zapata!		Elia Kazan	United States
We Are All Murderers	Nous sommes tous des assassins	André Cayatte	France, Italy

=== Out of Competition ===
The following film was selected to be screened out of competition:

- The Crimson Curtain (Le Rideau cramoisi) by Alexandre Astruc

=== Short Films Competition ===
- Les ailes de Ariel by Gaetano De Maria
- Animated Genesis by Peter Foldes, Joan Foldes
- Aperçus Sud Africain N° 5 - Afrique Préhistorique by Errol Hinds
- Apollon Musageta by Irène Dodall
- L'Art Sacre Missionnaire by Gentil Marques
- Aux frontières Yougoslaves by Djordie Vukotic
- Bambini by Francesco Maselli
- Cairo by Massimo Dallamano
- Les charmes des détails dans les tableaux des maîtres d'autrefois by Dr. Hans Curlis
- Le cordonnier et le chapelier by John Halas
- Dans les royaumes de la mer by Giovanni Roccardi
- Démonstration en matière de perception by Garett I. Johnson
- Les deux mousquetaires by William Hanna, Joseph Barbera
- Diagnostiquer et guérir by Ernest Bingen
- Djerba l'île biblique by Philippe Este
- El Dorado by John Alderson (filmmaker)
- Et la noce dansait by Yehoshua Bertonov
- Indian Village (Indisk by) by Arne Sucksdorff
- Le flottage du bois by Lee Prater, Dick Mosher
- La fugue de Mahmoud by Roger Leenhardt
- Les gens du nord by René Lucot
- La gloire verte by M. Ahmed
- Le grand Boudha by Noburo Ofuji
- La grande île au cœur des Saintes Eaux by Monique Muntcho, J.K. Raymond-Millet
- La grande passion by Alphonse Stummer
- Groenland : Vingt mille lieux sur les glaces by Marcel Ichac, Jean-Jacques Languepin
- L'homme dans la tour by Bernard Devlin, Jean Palardy
- Inside Newfoundland (Terre neuve) by Sydney Newman
- T Schot is te boord! by Herman van der Horst
- Les joies rustiques by V.R. Sarma
- Le jour de l'independance by Victor Vicas
- Le jour promis by S.I. Shweig
- Maskerage by Max De Haas
- Masques et visages de James Ensor by Paul Haesaerts
- Moines de l'ordre de la Merci by Christian Anwander
- Paysans de l'Aures by Philippe Este
- La peinture de Boldini by Gian Luigi Rondi
- Quarante ans d'évolution Marocaine - présence Française au Maroc by Serge Debecque
- Rythmes de Rotterdam by Ytzen Brusse
- Six mille ans de civilisation by Ahmed Korshid
- Story of Steel by Jagat Murari
- Strasbourg européenne by Ernest Bingen
- Panta Rhei by Bert Haanstra
- Union infernale by Ulrich Kayser
- Victor Hugo by Roger Leenhardt & Yvonne Gerber
- La vie des fresques by Zoran Markus
- Vieux temples, vieilles statues by Sôya Mizuki

== Official Awards ==
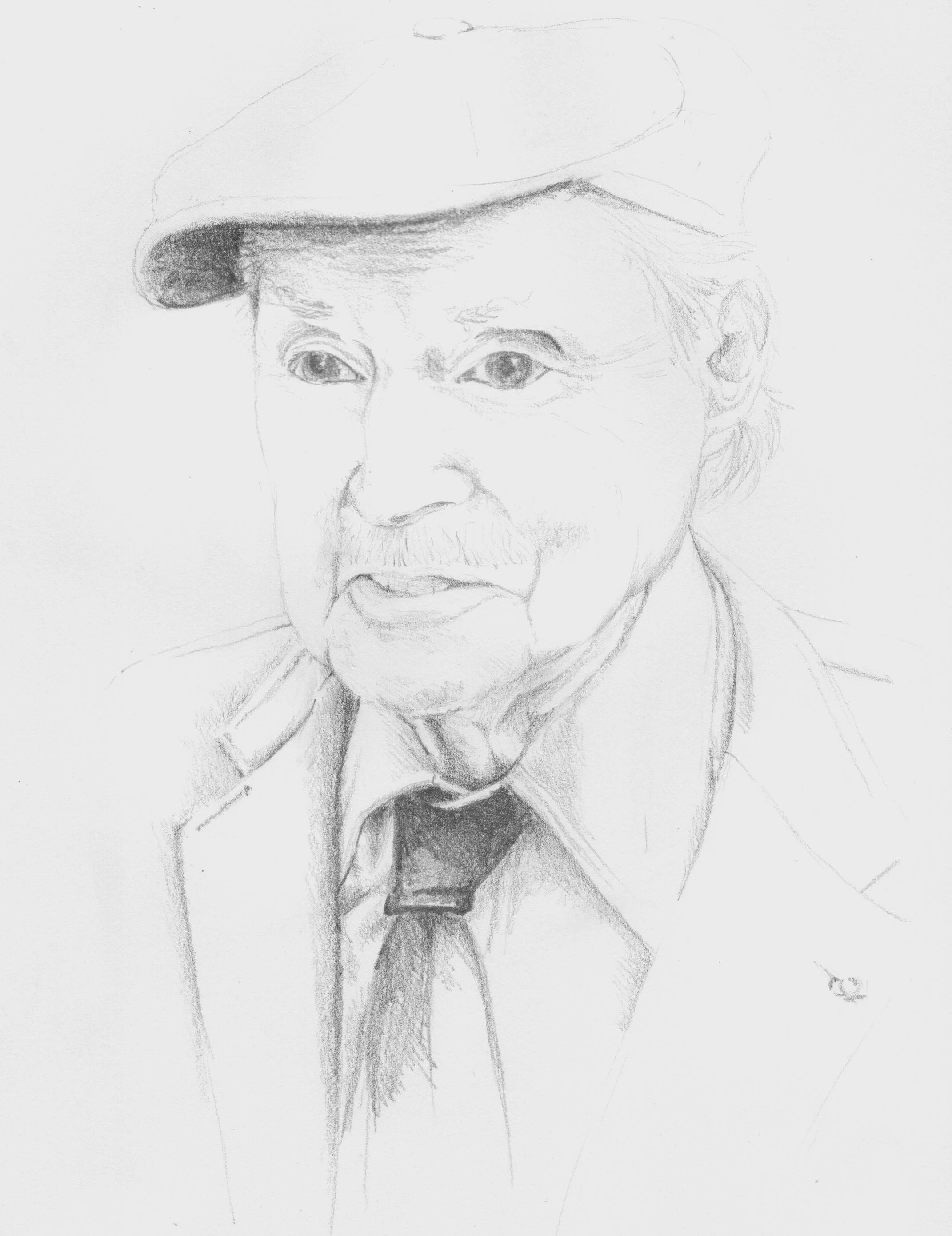
Maurice Genevoix, Jury President

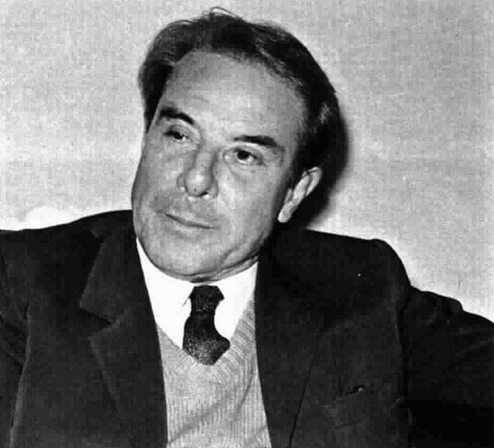
Renato Castellani, Grand Prix winner

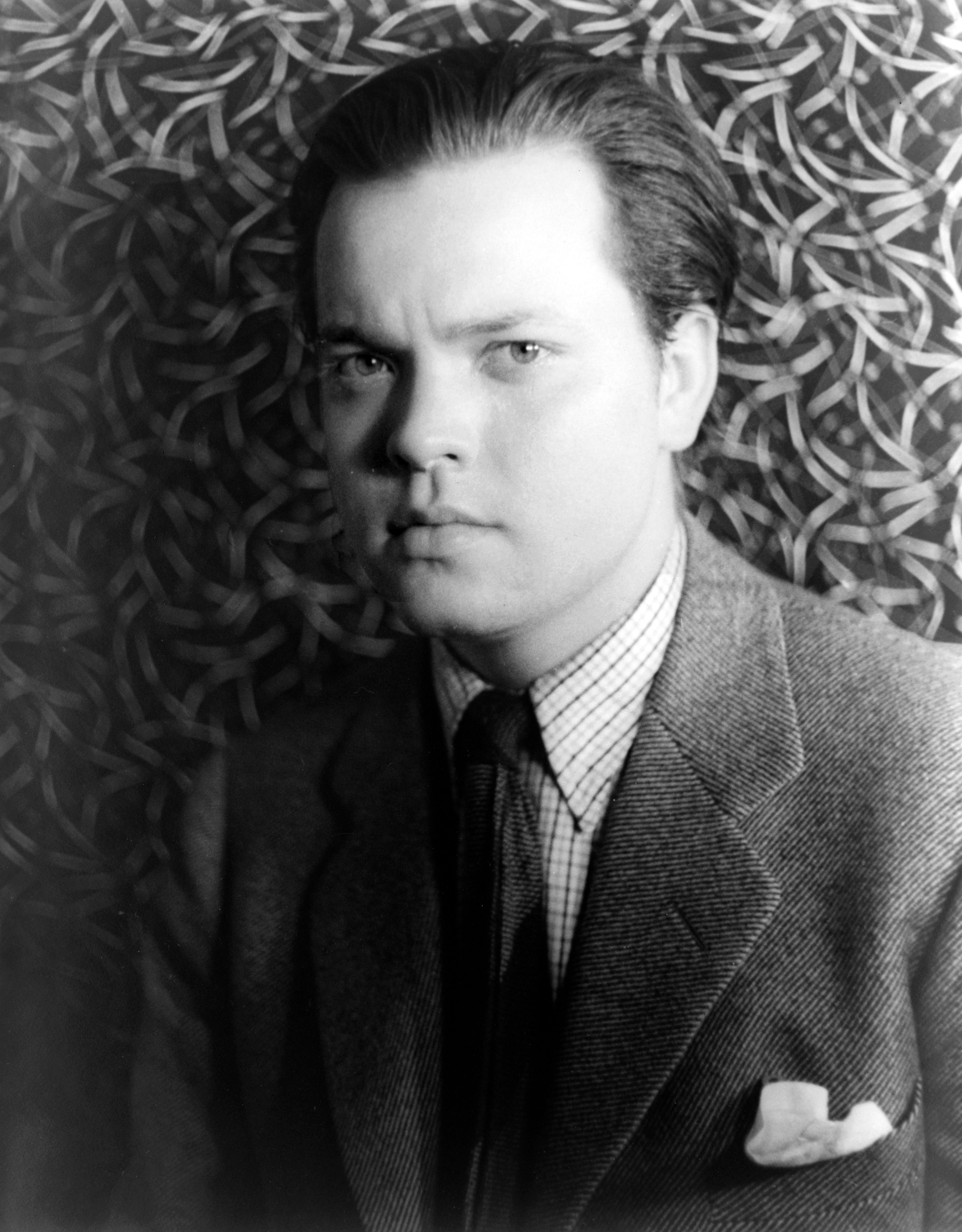
Orson Welles, Grand Prix winner

=== In Competition ===
- Grand Prix
  - Two Cents Worth of Hope by Renato Castellani
  - Othello by Orson Welles
- Best Director: Christian-Jaque for Fanfan la Tulipe
- Best Screenplay: Piero Tellini for Cops and Robbers
- Best Actress: Lee Grant for Detective Story
- Best Actor: Marlon Brando for Viva Zapata!
- Best Cinematography: The Tale of Genji by Kōzaburō Yoshimura
- Best Music: Sven Sköld for One Summer of Happiness
- Jury Special Prize: We Are All Murderers by André Cayatte
- Best Lyrical Film: The Medium by Gian Carlo Menotti

=== Short Films Competition ===
- Grand Prix: T Schot is te boord! by Herman van der Horst
- Prix spécial du Jury: Indian Village by Arne Sucksdorff
- Prix pour la couleur: Animated Genesis by Peter Foldes and Joan Foldes
- Prix spécial du Jury - film scientifique ou pédagogique: Groenland: Vingt mille lieux sur les glaces by Marcel Ichac and Jean-Jacques Languepin

== Independent Awards ==
=== OCIC Award ===
- Two Cents Worth of Hope by Renato Castellani
  - Special Mention: La Vie de Jésus by Marcel Gibaud

== Media ==
- Institut National de l'Audiovisuel: Opening of the 1952 Festival (commentary in French)
- INA: List of award-winners at the 1952 Cannes Festival (commentary in French)
