= Love on Wheels =

Love on Wheels may refer to:

- Love on Wheels (1932 film), a British musical comedy film
- Love on Wheels (1954 film), a Spanish musical comedy film
