= El Negro que tenía el alma blanca =

- Release date: 1951
- Country: Argentina
- Language: Spanish

El Negro que tenía el alma blanca is a 1951 Argentine musical film directed by Hugo del Carril during the classical era of Argentine cinema. It is based on a novel by Alberto Insúa.

== Cast ==
- Hugo del Carril
- María Rosa Salgado
- Antonio Casal
- Félix Fernández
- Carlos Díaz de Mendoza
- Manuel Arbó
- María Asquerino
- Antonio Riquelme
- Helga Liné
- Porfiria Sanchíz
- Manuel Aguilera
- Margarita Alexandre
- Elisa Méndez
- Juana Mansó
- Mónica Pastrana
