= Rumbo (film) =

1949 film

- Directed by: Ramón Torrado
- Written by: Rafael de León; Ramón Torrado; Antonio Quintero; H. S. Valdés
- Produced by: Fernando Granada; Daniel Mangrané
- Starring: Fernando Granada
- Cinematography: Andrés Pérez Cubero
- Edited by: Gaby Peñalba
- Release date: 1949
- Running time: 90 minutes
- Country: Spain
- Language: Spanish

Rumbo is a 1949 Spanish drama film set in Seville and directed by Ramón Torrado. It was entered into the 1951 Cannes Film Festival.

== Cast ==
- Fernando Granada - Rumbo
- Paquita Rico - Dulcenombre
- Fernando Fernández de Córdoba - Gabriel Hurtado Mendoza (as Fernando Fdez. de Cordoba)
- Julia Lajos
- Manuel Arbó - (as Manuel Arbo)
- Eloísa Muro - (as Eloisa Muro)
- Miguel Gómez - (as Miguel Gomez)
- Rosita Valero
- Tino G. Ferry
- José Riesgo
- Guillermo Cereceda
- Mancusa - Antonio, el gitanillo (as Vilches y Mancusa)
- Vilches - Rosarillo, la gitanilla (as Vilches y Mancusa)
