= Un beso en el puerto =

- Directed by: Ramón Torrado
- Produced by: Arturo González P.C.
- Music by: Songs: Manolo Escobar
- Release date: 1965
- Running time: 86 minutes
- Country: Spain
- Language: Spanish

Un beso en el puerto is a 1965 Spanish motion picture. The film was directed by Ramón Torrado, and stars Manolo Escobar, Ingrid Pitt, Antonio Ferrandis, María Isbert and Manuel Alexandre.

== Plot ==
Benidorm, 1960s. Manolo, a gas station employee, is fired from his job by his excessive fondness for singing. He meets an old friend, Jaime, who lives like a Prince and always accompanied by the tourists more beautiful who spend the summer in those beaches, and tells Manolo trick he uses to conquer them. Taking advantage of the absence of his friend, wears his clothes and puts into practice the trick. This consists of the port of Alicante and approaching the first handsome traveler that landing, hug her warmly and say: "Welcome, Dorothy!". Then, under the pretext of the confusion begins the friendship.

== Cast ==
- Manolo Escobar
- Ingrid Pitt as Dorothy
- Antonio Ferrandis
- María Isbert
- Manuel Alexandre
