= The Black Crown (film) =

1951 film

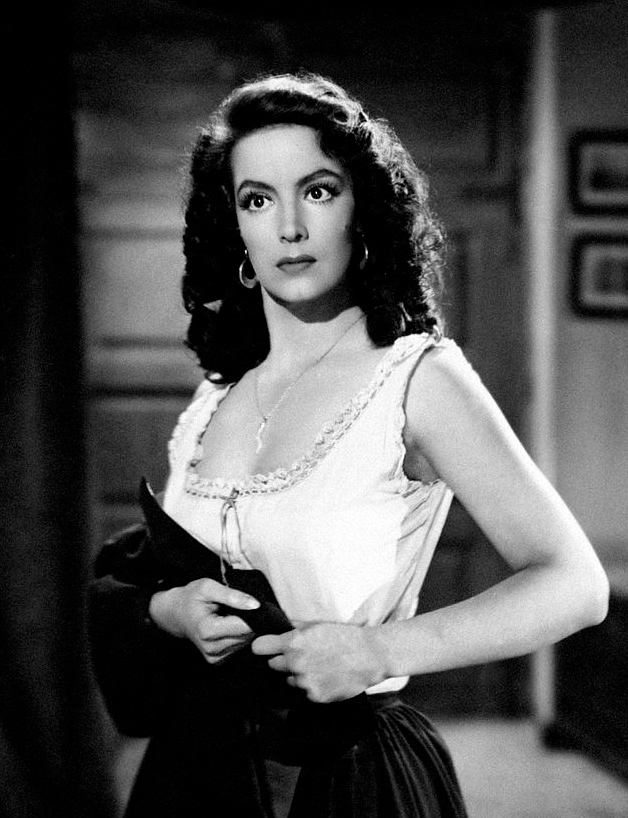
- María Félix in the film
- Directed by: Luis Saslavsky
- Screenplay by: Jean Cocteau; Charles de Peyret-Chappuis; Luis Saslavsky
- Based on: La Vénus d'Ille by Prosper Mérimée
- Produced by: Cesáreo González
- Starring: María Félix; Rossano Brazzi; Vittorio Gassman
- Cinematography: Antonio L. Ballesteros; Valentín Javier
- Edited by: José Antonio Rojo
- Music by: Juan Quintero
- Production company: Suevia Films
- Distributed by: Suevia Films
- Release date: 23 May 1951
- Running time: 106 minutes
- Countries: Spain; France
- Language: Spanish

The Black Crown (Spanish: La corona negra) is a 1951 Spanish-French film noir directed by Luis Saslavsky and starring María Félix, Rossano Brazzi and Vittorio Gassman. It is based on the story La Vénus d'Ille by Prosper Mérimée.

== Synopsis ==
In the city of Tangier, a woman named Mara (María Félix) suffers from amnesia after murdering her husband, who was about to demand a divorce for having caught her in illicit love affairs with a lover (Vittorio Gassman), who only loves her. interested in finding the place where some precious jewels are hidden. Disoriented, the woman runs away from her and finds the help of Andrés, who falls in love with her and tries to get her memory back. Although her patron saint sees in the tarot cards that a black crown that portends death revolves around the mysterious woman, Andrés ignores her and goes with her to the hotel where the clues indicate that he was staying with her. Mara is kidnapped by her former lover and locked in a gym on her property, but being amnesiac she can't tell him where she hid her husband's jewelry.

== Cast ==
- María Félix as Mara Russell
- Rossano Brazzi as Andrés
- Vittorio Gassman as Mauricio
- José María Lado as Sr. Russel
- Antonia Plana as Señora Russel
- Avelino Santana
- Julia Caba Alba as Flora
- Manuel Arbó as Orlando
- Antonia Herrero
- Félix Fernández as El jardinero
- Concha López Silva
- Casimiro Hurtado as El conde Ludovico
- Carmen Moreno
- Francisco Pierrá as Pío
- Dayna
- Santiago Rivero as Don Enrique
- María Cañete as Ana
- Mariano Alcón
- María Francés as María
- Domingo Rivas as Abogado de Mauricio
- Diana Salcedo
- Piéral as Pablo, the dwarf
- Arturo Bragaglia

== Bibliography ==
- Cynthia Tompkins & David William Foster. Notable Twentieth-century Latin American Women: A Biographical Dictionary. Greenwood Publishing Group, 2001.
