= Antonio Riquelme =

Spanish actor (1894–1968)

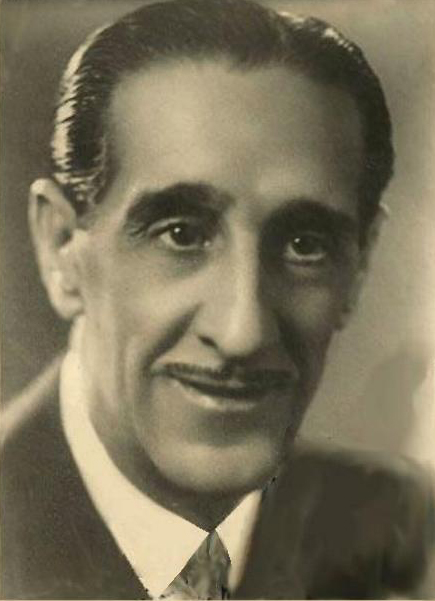
- Born: Antonio García-Riquelme Salvador; 9 November 1894; Madrid, Spain
- Died: 20 March 1968 (aged 73); Madrid, Spain
- Occupation: Actor
- Years active: 1911-1967

Antonio García-Riquelme Salvador (9 November 1894 – 20 March 1968), better known as Antonio Riquelme, was a Spanish film actor. He appeared in more than 140 films between 1911 and 1967.

== Selected filmography ==
- El fantasma del castillo (1911)
- Por la vida del rey o El misterio de la corte de Suavia (1916)
- La mano (1916)
- El misterio de una noche de verano o El enigma de una noche (1916)
- Deuda pagada (1916)
- La dicha ajena (1917)
- La tía de Pancho (1918)
- La chica del gato (1927)
- Los vencedores de la muerte (1927)
- Una morena y una rubia (1933)
- Yo canto para ti (1934)
- Diez días millonaria (1934)
- The Dancer and the Worker (1936) - Patricio
- El rayo (1939)
- En poder de Barba Azul (1940)
- El crucero Baleares (1941) - El político
- Para ti es el mundo (1941)
- We Thieves Are Honourable (1942) - Castelar
- Flora y Mariana (1942) - Fabio
- El pobre rico (1942)
- ¡Qué contenta estoy! (1942)
- Todo por ellas (1942)
- Idilio en Mallorca (1943)
- Cinnamon Flower (1943) - Taranto
- Mosquita en palacio (1943)
- Deliciosamente tontos (1943) - Radiotelegrafista
- La boda de Quinita Flores (1943) - Don Cayo
- Santander, la ciudad en llamas (1944) - Coletín
- Yo no me caso (1944)
- Tuvo la culpa Adán (1944) - Santos Olmedo de Alcaraz
- The Tower of the Seven Hunchbacks (1944) - Don Zacarías
- El hombre que las enamora (1944) - Dimas
- Ella, él y sus millones (1944) - Don Antonio
- Tambor y cascabel (1944)
- The Road to Babel (1945) - Bruno
- Noche decisiva (1945) - Moutito
- Cinco lobitos (1945)
- A los pies de usted (1945) - Compadre
- Un hombre de negocios (1945) - Cochero
- Su última noche (1945) - Borracho
- La mentira de la gloria (1946) - Malospelos
- Barrio (1947) - Hombre en taberna
- Lola Leaves for the Ports (1947) - Calamares
- Don Quixote (1947) - Porquero (Swineherd) (uncredited)
- Mi enemigo el doctor (1948)
- Confidences (1948) - Redactor
- Las aguas bajan negras (1948) - Médico
- Noche de Reyes (1949)
- The Duchess of Benameji (1949) - Mayoral
- Doce horas de vida (1949) - Gerente del hotel
- The Troublemaker (1950) - Tiberio
- Thirty Nine Love Letters (1950) - David
- Woman to Woman (1950) - Gutiérrez
- Gente sin importancia (1950)
- Apollo Theatre (1950)
- El Negro que tenía el alma blanca (1951) - Bélmez
- The Lioness of Castille (1951)
- Cielo negro (1951) - Churrero en la verbena
- A Cuban in Spain (1951) - Maquinista 2º
- La trinca del aire (1951) - Vendedor
- Our Lady of Fatima (1951) - Carballo
- The Great Galeoto (1951)
- Lola the Coalgirl (1952) - Domingo Carmona
- Devil's Roundup (1952)
- The Eyes Leave a Trace (1952) - Sereno
- Sister San Sulpicio (1952) - Revisor del tren
- The Song of Sister Maria (1952) - Horacio
- Doña Francisquita (1952) - Pepe (uncredited)
- La laguna negra (1952) - Ayudante del juez
- Babes in Bagdad (1952) - Omar
- Women's Town (1953) - Telegrafista
- Airport (1953) - Comisario
- Such is Madrid (1953) - Peluquero
- Nobody Will Know (1953) - Empleado de correos
- Under the Sky of Spain (1953)
- Jeromin (1953) - Diego Ruiz
- Pasaporte para un ángel (Órdenes secretas) (1954)
- Boyfriend in Sight (1954) - Antonio Cortina
- All Is Possible in Granada (1954) - Padre del limpiabotas
- Adventures of the Barber of Seville (1954) - Cabo de alguaciles
- Malvaloca (1954) - Silbío
- Como la tierra (1954) - Cañamón
- Love on Wheels (1954) - Viajero enamorado
- Felices Pascuas (1954) - Comandante de Artillería
- Three are Three (1954) - Announcer (segment "Una de indios")
- The Moorish Queen (1955) - Don Nué
- The Other Life of Captain Contreras (1955) - Eleuterio
- La hermana alegría (1955) - Serafín (uncredited)
- El guardián del paraíso (1955) - El Solomillo
- Para siempre (1955)
- The Cock Crow (1955) - Conserje
- La lupa (1955) - Felipe
- La pícara molinera (1955) - Capitán
- Sighs of Triana (1955)
- Rapto en la ciudad (1955)
- The Adventures of Gil Blas (1956) - Dr. Sangrado
- También hay cielo sobre el mar (1956) - Plácido
- Amor y toros (1956)
- ¡Aquí hay petróleo! (1956) - Timoteo Cano
- Don Juan (1956)
- Sucedió en mi aldea (1956) - Encargado de la fundición
- El fenómeno (1956) - Marcelo Rodríguez
- Manolo guardia urbano (1956) - Orfeo, el concertista
- Dos novias para un torero (1956)
- La ironía del dinero (1957) - Mendigo tuerto (segment "Sevilla")
- Un fantasma llamado amor (1957)
- Un marido de ida y vuelta (1957) - Elias
- Los ángeles del volante (1957) - Antonio
- Polvorilla (1957)
- Sueños de historia (1957)
- Historias de Madrid (1958) - Don Sergio
- El hombre del paraguas blanco (1958) - Pega
- Heroes del Aire (1958) - Andaluz
- The Fan (1958) - Gregorio
- Villa Alegre (1958) - Padre de Genara
- Te doy mi vida (1958)
- Secretaria para todo (1958) - Taxista
- Where Are You Going, Alfonso XII? (1959) - Madrileño
- Marinai, donne e guai (1959) - Domenico
- Gayarre (1959) - Sr. Pedro
- Bombas para la paz (1959) - Loco
- Y después del cuplé (1959)
- El día de los enamorados (1959) - Damián
- Los tramposos (1959) - Pérez
- Nel blu dipinto di blu (1959) - Sor Napoleone
- El secreto de papá (1959)
- Toro bravo (1960)
- El hombre que perdió el tren (1960)
- The Showgirl (1960) - Novio de Rosa
- Compadece al delincuente (1960)
- El cochecito (1960) - Doctor
- Pelusa (1960)
- La estatua (1961)
- La bella Mimí (1961)
- Honorables sinvergüenzas (1961) - Letanías
- Mi adorable esclava (1962) - Bautista
- Teresa de Jesús (1962) - Físico #1
- Vamos a contar mentiras (1962) - Sacerdote
- La pandilla de los once (1963) - El Spaguetti
- The Troublemaker (1963) - Tiberio
- Suspendido en sinvergüenza (1963) - Felipe 'El corcheas'
- Júrame (1964)
- El espontáneo (1964) - Situado
- El salario del crimen (1964) - Hombre al que la policía pide información
- Destino: Barajas (1965)
- Jugando a morir (1966) - Paco
- Fray Torero (1966) - Hermano Servando
- Good Morning, Little Countess (1967)
- La niña del patio (1967) - Antonio, hermano de Carmen
