= Xan das Bolas =

Spanish actor (1908–1977)

- Born: Tomás Ares Pena; 30 October 1908; A Coruña, Galicia
- Died: 13 October 1977 (aged 68); Madrid
- Occupation: Actor
- Spouse: Lina Chiverto

Tomás Ares Pena, known as Xan das Bolas (30 October 1908 – 13 September 1977) was a Spanish comic actor active during the franquism with films including Botón de ancla (1961).

== Filmography ==
=== Films ===
- Salomé (1940)
- ¡Polizón a bordo! (1941) as Alguacil
- Torbellino (1941) as Juan José (as Fernando Tomás Ares)
- Unos pasos de mujer (1942)
- The Man Who Wanted to Kill Himself (1942) as Huésped
- Éramos siete a la mesa (1942)
- Goyescas (1942) as Asistente
- La rueda de la vida (1942) as Juanito
- Madrid de mis sueños (1942)
- Adam's Fault (1944) as Guardia
- Life Begins at Midnight (1944)
- Ella, él y sus millones (1944) as El guía
- El pozo de los enamorados (1945)
- Un hombre de negocios (1945) as Conserje del museo
- Mar abierto (1946) as Peirán
- El pirata Bocanegra (1946)
- El doncel de la reina (1946)
- Héroes del 95 (1947) as Fadeiro
- Love Charm (1947) (scenes deleted)
- Botón de ancla (1948) as Trinquete
- El marqués de Salamanca (1948) as Hombre almacén figuras de cera
- Pototo, Boliche y Compañía (1948)
- Sabela de Cambados (1949) as Benito
- I'm Not Mata Hari (1950) as Don Cosme Fernández
- A Tale of Two Villages (1951)
- La trinca del aire (1951) as Pepiño
- Duda (1951) as Sereno
- El gran Galeoto (1951) as Cochero
- La niña de la venta (1951) as Dimas
- Niebla y sol (1951) as Meigo
- Sobresaliente (1953)
- El diablo toca la flauta (1953) as Presidente
- La alegre caravana (1953)
- Aeropuerto (1953)
- Nadie lo sabrá (1953) as Cartero
- Vuelo 971 (1953) as Padre
- Ha desaparecido un pasajero (1953)
- Buenas noticias (1954)
- Malvaloca (1954) as Barrabás
- Love on Wheels (1954) as Cristóbal
- La ciudad de los sueños (1954)
- Tres huchas para Oriente (1954) as Portero del estadio (uncredited)
- Tres eran tres (1955) (segment "Una de indios")
- La reina mora (1955) as Presidiario
- La cruz de mayo (1955) as Félix
- Coyote (1955) as Mendigo
- El guardián del paraíso (1955)
- Historias de la radio (1955) as Sargento de la guardia civil
- Siempre para ti (1955)
- Noche de tormenta (1955)
- Un día perdido (1955) as Maestro de baile
- Orgullo (1955) as Gabriel
- Tarde de toros (1956) as Portero de la enfermería
- El rey de la carretera (1956) as Pedro
- ¡Aquí hay petróleo! (1956) as Baldomero
- Curra Veleta (1956) as Sereno
- El fenómeno (1956) as Guardia del Parque
- La mestiza (1956)
- El malvado Carabel (1956) as Bedel
- Fedra, the Devil's Daughter (1956) (uncredited)
- Saeta rubia (1956) as Taxista
- Dos novias para un torero (1956)
- Piedras vivas (1956)
- Pasión en el mar (1956) as El Sabio
- Susana y yo (1957)
- El hombre que viajaba despacito (1957) as Jugador de cartas
- Un fantasma llamado amor (1957)
- Faustina (1957) as Lipio
- The Pride and the Passion (1957) (uncredited)
- Fulano y Mengano (1957) as Conductor del coche fúnebre
- Un marido de ida y vuelta (1957) as Díaz
- El anónimo (1957)
- Las muchachas de azul (1957) as Felipe – padre de Ana
- Historias de Madrid (1958) as Ciriaco – guarda del cementerio (uncredited)
- Familia provisional (1958)
- Aquellos tiempos del cuplé (1958) as Tendero
- El hombre del paraguas blanco (1958) as Alguacil No. 1
- Héroes del aire (1958) as Percebe
- La venganza (1958) as Segador gallego
- El puente de la paz (1958) as Dedos Largos
- La vida por delante (1958) as Copiloto de la camioneta
- Ana dice sí (1958) as Don Cristino
- Caravana de esclavos (1958) as Hassan (uncredited)
- Farmacia de guardia (1958) as Sereno
- ¿Dónde vas, Alfonso XII? (1959) as Madrileño gritón (uncredited)
- The Redeemer (1959)
- Diez fusiles esperan (1959) as Cañete
- Échame la culpa (1959)
- Sonatas (1959) as Tercer centinela
- La vida alrededor (1959) as Demetrio Suárez 'El Asunción'
- En las ruinas de Babilonia (1959) as Abdullah (uncredited)
- The Jinx (1959) as Sobrino de D. Balbino No. 2
- Las dos y media y... veneno (1959) as Hombre en consulta veterinario
- Se vende un tranvía (1959, Short) as Marmolista
- El hombre que perdió el tren (1960) as Federico Méndez
- Crimen para recién casados (1960) as Camarero del ferrocarril
- Ama Rosa (1960) as Cochero
- The Boy Who Stole a Million (1960) as Knife Grinder
- Un paso al frente (1960)
- El indulto (1960) as Músico ambulante
- Patricia mía (1961)
- Conqueror of Maracaibo (1961) as Ben Yussuf (uncredited)
- Aquí están las vicetiples (1961) as Dueño Kiosco
- Revolt of the Mercenaries (1961) as Katia's Companion
- Fantasmas en la casa (1961)
- El pobre García (1961) as Felipe
- Plácido (1961) as Rivas
- Ella y los veteranos (1961) as Dueño caseta de tiro
- Pecado de amor (1961) as Sereno
- Madame (1961)
- Fray Escoba (1961)
- Vamos a contar mentiras (1961) as Sacerdote
- La venganza de Don Mendo (1962) as Alí
- Martes y trece (1962)
- Zorro the Avenger (1962) as Soldado
- The Son of Captain Blood (1962) as Matt
- Los que no fuimos a la guerra (1962) as Propietario bar Fandiño
- The Savage Guns (1962) as Pedro
- Los motorizados (1962) (uncredited)
- Terrible Sheriff (1962) as Wagon Loader (uncredited)
- La gran familia (1962) (uncredited)
- Three Fables of Love (1962)
- Shades of Zorro (1962) as Empleado de banca
- Torrejón City (1962) as Ojo de Halcón
- Girl from La Mancha (1962) as Carretero
- Mathias Sandorf (1963) as Carpena
- Plaza de oriente (1963) as Camarero
- The Castilian (1963)
- Millonario por un día (1963) as Atracador
- Duel at the Rio Grande (1963) as Mejicano
- Implacable Three (1963) as Cartero
- The Executioner (1963) as Guarda de la obra
- Gunfight at Red Sands (1963) as Barbero (uncredited)
- The Adventures of Scaramouche (1963) as Gino
- Los mangantes (1963) as Antonio Monterosi (segment "Medico i fidanzata")
- Escala en Hi-Fi (1963)
- Una chica casi formal (1963) as Propietario bar
- Chica para todo (1963) as Gancho del timador
- Bochorno (1963)
- La verbena de la Paloma (1963) as Francisco, el sereno
- La revoltosa (1963) as Jugador de cartas
- Un demonio con ángel (1963) as Don Federico
- The Ceremony (1963)
- Pacto de silencio (1963) as Guardia del tren
- José María (1963)
- El precio de un asesino (1963) as Cura
- Jaguar (1963)
- El camino (1964) as Padre de Germán
- Heroes of the West (1964) as Doctor
- La chica del gato (1964) as Venancio
- Gibraltar (1964) as Poker Player
- Como dos gotas de agua (1964) as Martínez
- Los mangantes (1964) (uncredited)
- Gunfighters of Casa Grande (1964) as Vasco
- La muerte silba un blues (1964) as Policía
- El extraño viaje (1964) as Cosme
- Backfire (1964) as Guard of the boat parking
- Black Angel of the Mississippi (1964) as Lopez
- El espontáneo (1964) as Situado
- El pecador y la bruja (1964) as Portero
- Los Palomos (1964) as Taxi driver
- Los dinamiteros (1964) as Marmolista
- Gunmen of the Rio Grande (1964) as Peon
- Relevo para un pistolero (1964) as Recepcionista del hotel
- Cavalry Charge (1964)
- Dos chicas locas, locas... (1965) as Guarda de la estación de tren
- Shoot to Kill (1965) as Pedro, the Mexican
- Whisky y vodka (1965) as Pintor
- Mi canción es para ti (1965) as Propietario caballos de carreras
- In a Colt's Shadow (1965) as Veterinarian
- Cotolay (1965) as Monje
- Seven Guns for the MacGregors (1966) as Barman (uncredited)
- Lost Command (1966) as Old man with a flag (uncredited)
- Ypotron – Final Countdown (1966) as Il portiere dell'hotel
- La mujer perdida (1966)
- Amador (1966) as Limpiabotas (scenes deleted)
- Fray Torero (1966) as Un habitante del pueblo
- The Tough One (1966)
- Vestida de novia (1966)
- Proceso a una estrella (1966)
- Una novia relámpago (1966)
- Clint the Stranger (1967) as Simpson
- Dos cruces en Danger Pass (1967) as Bartender
- La niña del patio (1967) as Don Calixto, administrador
- Club de solteros (1967) as Lucas
- Run Like a Thief (1967) as Gonzalez
- Operación cabaretera (1967) as Guardia
- 40 grados a la sombra (1967) as Portero casa de Evaristo
- Operación Mata Hari (1968) as Jefe de sala del cabaret
- Villa Rides (1968) as Villa's Telegraphist (uncredited)
- ¡Cómo está el servicio! (1968) as Sereno con un bastón
- Los que tocan el piano (1968) as Rufino Celeiro – el Sereno
- One by One (1968) as Bartender Ben (uncredited)
- God Was in the West, Too, at One Time (1968)
- Cuidado con las señoras (1968) as Camarero
- Objetivo: bi-ki-ni (1969)
- Pasto de fieras (1969)
- No somos ni Romeo ni Julieta (1969) as Policía secreta de noche 1º
- Dead Are Countless (1969) as Potter (uncredited)
- Amor a todo gas (1969) as Cristobal
- Juicio de faldas (1969) as Paco, amigo de Gregorio
- Educando a una idiota (1969)
- El niño y el potro (Más allá de río Miño) (1969) as Rogelio
- Con ella llegó el amor (1970)
- El alma se serena (1970) as Jefe de estación
- El mesón del gitano (1970) as Ezequiel
- Sabata the Killer (1970) as Telegrafo
- Don Erre que erre (1970) as Guardia Civil 1
- Una señora llamada Andrés (1970) as Empleado de limpieza
- El apartamento de la tentación (1971) as Forest Guard
- Una chica casi decente (1971)
- Murders in the Rue Morgue (1971) as Orsini's Assistant
- Delusions of Grandeur (1971) (uncredited)
- Simón, contamos contigo (1971)
- La montaña rebelde (1971) as Ermitaño
- Cut-Throats Nine (1972) as Buddy (as Tomas Ares)
- Celos, amor y Mercado Común (1973) as Amigo de Felipe
- Cinco almohadas para una noche (1974) as Recepcionista del Balneario Fuencaliente
- Cuando los niños vienen de Marsella (1974) as Padre de José
- Una pareja... distinta (1974) as Truhán (as Xan Das Bolas)
- La boda o la vida (1974)
- Los locos del oro negro (1975) as Sam – Merchant (uncredited)
- El mejor regalo (1975)
- La Carmen (1976) as Padre de José
- The Legion Like Women (1976) as Tabernero
- Madrid, Costa Fleming (1976) as Marcelo
- Vuelve, querida Nati (1976) as Conserje
- Volvoreta (1976) as Ramon
- Los hijos de... (1976) as Barrendero
- The Second Power (1976) as Fray Lope
- El chiste (1976) as Guardia forestal / Ganadero / Jefe indio (as Xandas Bolas)
- Mi hija Hildegart (1977) as Un republicano
- Me siento extraña (1977) as Cliente taberna (final film role)

=== TV series ===
- Hermenegildo Pérez, para servirle (1966)
- ¿Es usted el asesino? (1967) as Caricortao
- Los paladines (1972)
- Crónicas de un pueblo (1971–1974) as Camilo
- Ficciones (1974)
- El pícaro (1974) as El Vendedor
- Cuentos y leyendas (1974) as Fadrique
- El quinto jinete (1975) as Arriero / Riaño
- Un, dos, tres... responda otra vez (1976) as Simbad el Marineiro
- Curro Jiménez (1977)
