= A Palace for Sale =

1943 film

- Directed by: Ladislao Vajda
- Written by: Luis de Vargas
- Starring: Roberto Rey; Mary Santamaría; José Nieto; Manolo Morán
- Cinematography: Isidoro Goldberger
- Music by: Jesús García Leoz
- Production company: Productores Asociados
- Release date: 1943
- Running time: 88 minutes
- Country: Spain
- Language: Spanish

A Palace for Sale (Spanish: Se vende un palacio) is a 1943 Spanish comedy film directed by Ladislao Vajda and starring Roberto Rey, Mary Santamaría and José Nieto. It was the Hungarian-born director's first film in Spain, where he was to settle and become a leading filmmaker.

== Cast ==
- Roberto Rey
- Mary Santamaría
- José Nieto
- Manolo Morán
- Julia Lajos
- María Brú
- Manuel Arbó
- María Luisa Gerona
- Fernando Fernán Gómez

== Bibliography ==
- D'Lugo, Marvin. Guide to the Cinema of Spain. Greenwood Publishing, 2007.
