= A Toast for Manolete =

- Directed by: Florián Rey
- Written by: Enrique Llovet; Eduardo Manzanos Brochero; José María Pemán; José Carlos de Luna; Florián Rey
- Produced by: Miguel García Rico
- Starring: Paquita Rico; Pedro Ortega; Manolo Morán; Manuel Monroy
- Cinematography: Heinrich Gärtner
- Edited by: Magdalena Pulido
- Music by: José Muñoz Molleda
- Production company: Hércules Films
- Release date: 20 December 1948
- Running time: 88 minutes
- Country: Spain
- Language: Spanish

A Toast for Manolete (Spanish:Brindis a Manolete) is a 1948 Spanish drama film directed by Florián Rey and starring Paquita Rico, Pedro Ortega and Manolo Morán. The film is a biopic of the celebrated Spanish bullfighter Manolete, who had been killed the previous year.

== Cast ==
- Paquita Rico as Dolores
- Pedro Ortega as Manuel Rodríguez 'Manolete'
- Manolo Morán as Antonio
- Ana Adamuz as Doña Rosario
- Manuel Monroy as Javier del Álamo
- Eulália del Pino as Soledad
- José Jaspe as Bronquista en bar
- Mercedes Castellanos as Mercedes
- Domingo Rivas as Gabriel
- Juana Mansó as Remedios
- Manolo Iglesias as Juan
- Emilio Ruiz de Córdoba as Médico
- José Greco as Rafael
- Rafael Romero as Cantaor
- Rafael Bardem as Hombre que da mala noticia
- Trío Escudero as Trío flamenco
- Fernanda 'La Cordobesita' as Bailaora
- Porreto
- Manzanilla
- Orozco
- Manolo Badajoz
- Sevillano
- Joaquina Martí
- Luis Maravilla

== Bibliography ==
- Bentley, Bernard. A Companion to Spanish Cinema. Boydell & Brewer 2008.
