= Estrella of the Sierra Morena =

1952 film

- Directed by: Ramón Torrado
- Written by: José Palma; Ramón Perelló; Víctor López Iglesias; Ramón Torrado
- Produced by: Cesáreo González
- Starring: Lola Flores; Rubén Rojo; José Nieto
- Cinematography: Manuel Berenguer
- Edited by: Gaby Peñalba
- Music by: Manuel Monreal
- Production company: Suevia Films
- Distributed by: Suevia Films
- Release date: 20 June 1952
- Running time: 96 minutes
- Country: Spain
- Language: Spanish

Estrella of the Sierra Morena (Spanish: Estrella de Sierra Morena) is a 1952 Spanish historical drama film directed by Ramón Torrado and starring Lola Flores, Rubén Rojo and José Nieto. It was produced and distributed by Suevia Films, one of the two dominant Spanish studios along with Cifesa. The film's sets were designed by the art director Enrique Alarcón.

== Cast ==
- Lola Flores as Estrella
- Rubén Rojo as Carlos
- José Nieto as Juan María
- Manolo Morán as Ladeao
- Fernando Fernández de Córdoba as Corregidor
- Félix Fernández as Padre Francisco
- Fernando Sancho as Rafael
- Raúl Cancio as Vasco
- Juan Vázquez as Don Periquito
- José Isbert as Labriego
- Antoñita Ariel as Rocío
- Juana Mansó a s Dolores
- Félix Briones as Manuel
- Casimiro Hurtado as Joseíllo
- Arturo Marín as Marchenero
- Manuel Requena as Alcaide
- María Luisa Ponte as Alicia
- Carmen Flores as Gitanilla
- Pilar Gómez Ferrer as Señorita cursi
- Francisco Bernal as Truhán
- Beni Deus as Sargento
- Manuel Guitián as Sacristán
- Rosario Royo as Ventera
- José Gomis as Oficial que lee el bando
- Manrique Gil as Médico
- Dolores Bremón as Úrsula

== Bibliography ==
- Bentley, Bernard. A Companion to Spanish Cinema. Boydell & Brewer 2008.
- Labanyi, Jo. Constructing Identity in Contemporary Spain. Oxford University Press, 2002.
