= Cinnamon Flower =

1943 film

- Directed by: Eduardo García Maroto
- Written by: Antonio Guzmán Merino
- Starring: Juanita Reina; José María Seoane; Pastora Imperio
- Cinematography: Manuel Berenguer
- Edited by: Bienvenida Sanz
- Music by: Manuel Quiroga
- Production company: Rafa Films
- Release date: 29 March 1943
- Running time: 97 minutes
- Country: Spain
- Language: Spanish

Cinnamon Flower (Spanish:Canelita en rama) is a 1943 Spanish musical comedy film directed by Eduardo García Maroto and starring Juanita Reina, José María Seoane and Pastora Imperio. The film's sets were designed by the art director Teddy Villalba.

== Plot ==
After studying with the nuns, the gypsy Rocío (Juanita Reina) returns to the farmhouse of her godfather, Count Juan (Luis Peña), she and the count's son fall in love, in what seems like an impossible love since there are rumors that they are brothers, which would cause incest.

== Cast ==
- Juanita Reina
- José María Seoane
- Pastora Imperio
- Fernando Fresno
- Antonio Riquelme
- Luis Peña padre
- Félix Fernández
- Ricardo Acero
- Angelita Bernal Molinero
- Delfín Pulido

== Bibliography ==
- Eva Woods Peiró. White Gypsies: Race and Stardom in Spanish Musical Films. U of Minnesota Press, 2012.
