= The Wheel of Life (1942 film) =

- Spanish: La rueda de la vida
- Directed by: Eusebio Fernández Ardavín
- Written by: H. S. Valdés; Ramón Torrado; Eusebio Fernández Ardavín
- Produced by: Cesáreo González
- Starring: Antoñita Colomé; Ismael Merlo
- Cinematography: Henri Barreyre
- Edited by: Antonio Martínez
- Music by: Modesto Rebollo
- Production company: Suevia Films
- Release date: 13 November 1942
- Running time: 90 minutes
- Country: Spain
- Language: Spanish

The Wheel of Life (Spanish: La rueda de la vida) is a 1942 Spanish film directed by Eusebio Fernández Ardavín.

== Synopsis ==
The singer Nina Luján falls in love with Alberto del Vall, a composer who became famous in America and the two meet again after years, when she has entered an asylum after failing in her artistic career.

== Cast ==
- Ismael Merlo as Alberto del Vall
- Antoñita Colomé as Nina Luján
- Gabriel Algara as Don Ricardo
- Pedro Barreto as Peter
- Eduardo Stern as Enrique
- Alfonso Mancheño as Federico
- Elisa Cavalcanti as Criada
- Antonio Bayón as Don Rosendo
- Xan das Bolas as Juanito
- Salvador Videgaín
- M. Romero Hita as Francisco
- Antonio Casas as Javier
- Esperanza Hidalgo as Trini
- Elena Salvador

== Reception ==
The Wheel of Life was nominated for the best film of year in Spain, and was one of the five best films of the year.
