= Julia Lajos =

Spanish actress

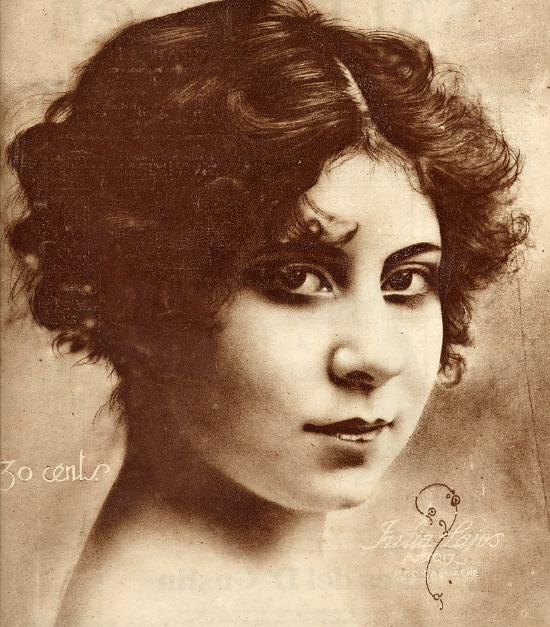
- Born: 24 February 1894; Vilagarcía de Arousa, Spain
- Died: 21 June 1963 (aged 69); Madrid, Spain
- Occupation: Actress
- Years active: 1926-1963

Julia Lajos (24 February 1894 – 21 June 1963) was a Spanish film actress. She appeared in more than 50 films between 1926 and 1963.

== Selected filmography ==
- A Palace for Sale (1942)
- Orosia (1943)
- Lady in Ermine (1943)
- Life Begins at Midnight (1944)
- The Tower of the Seven Hunchbacks (1944)
- The Road to Babel (1945)
- Bamboo (1945)
- Lady in Ermine (1947)
- The Faith (1947)
- Guest of Darkness (1948)
- Rumbo (1949)
- Just Any Woman (1949)
- Apollo Theatre (1950)
- The Troublemaker (1950)
- The Last Horse (1950)
- Don Juan (1950)
- My Beloved Juan (1950)
- Service at Sea (1951)
- Captain Poison (1951)
- The Great Galeoto (1951)
- Nobody Will Know (1953)
- Doña Francisquita (1953)
- Malvaloca (1954)
- High Fashion (1954)
- The Cock Crow (1955)
