= The Emigrant (1946 film) =

1946 film

- Directed by: Ramón Torrado
- Written by: H.S. Valdés; Adolfo Torrado
- Produced by: Cesáreo González
- Starring: Miriam Di San Servolo; Manolo Morán; Raúl Cancio
- Cinematography: Andrés Pérez Cubero
- Edited by: Gaby Peñalba
- Music by: Jesús Guridi; Jorge Halpern
- Production company: Suevia Films
- Distributed by: Suevia Films
- Release date: 1946
- Running time: 97 minutes
- Country: Spain
- Language: Spanish

The Emigrant (Spanish: El emigrado) is a 1946 Spanish drama film directed by Ramón Torrado and starring Miriam Di San Servolo, Manolo Morán and Raúl Cancio.

== Cast ==
- Miriam Di San Servolo as Dorothy Wills
- Manolo Morán as Josechu
- Raúl Cancio as Ignacio Ibarrola
- Jorge Mistral as Jaime
- María Asquerino as Marichu
- Alfonso Estela as José Mari Ibarrola
- Alberto Romea as Mister Wills
- Carmen Sánchez as Doña Isabel
- Félix Fernández as Don Vicente
- Fernando Fernández de Córdoba as Don Ignacio Ibarrola
- Mari Merche as Bailarina

== Bibliography ==
- Bosworth, R.J.B. Claretta: Mussolini's Last Lover. Yale University Press, 2017.
- Castro de Paz, José Luis & Pérez Jaime, Pena. Ramón Torrado: cine de consumo no franquismo. Consellería de Cultura e Xuventude, 1993.
