= Curra Veleta =

1956 film

- Directed by: Ramón Torrado
- Written by: Luis Tejedor Pérez; José María Elorrieta; Manuel Sebares
- Produced by: José Luis Jerez Aloza
- Starring: Paquita Rico; Valeriano León; Gérard Tichy
- Cinematography: José F. Aguayo
- Edited by: Gaby Peñalba
- Music by: Juan Solano; Xandro Valerio
- Production company: Dauro Films
- Distributed by: CIFESA
- Release date: 25 June 1956
- Running time: 83 minutes
- Country: Spain
- Language: Spanish

Curra Veleta is a 1956 Spanish musical comedy film directed by Ramón Torrado and starring Paquita Rico, Valeriano León and Gérard Tichy. The film's sets were designed by the art director Román Calatayud.

== Cast ==
- Paquita Rico as Curra Veleta
- Valeriano León as Ponciano Ramírez
- Gérard Tichy as Alfredo Brighton
- Josefina Serratosa as Remedios
- Félix Fernández as Don Serapio
- Manuel Arbó as Prof. Wilson
- Emilio Segura as Dr. Manolo Álvarez
- José Prada as Dr. Ramiro Pompei
- Joaquín Roa as José Camino 'Cartelito'
- Casimiro Hurtado as Tabernero
- José Sepúlveda as Comisario
- Rosario Royo as Vecina
- Rufino Inglés as Recepcionista hotel
- Xan das Bolas as Sereno
- Aníbal Vela as Mateo Alvarado - notario
- Francisco Bernal as Cartero
- Antonio Vega as Dr. Luque Ibáñez
- María Cañete as Mujer en pelea

== Bibliography ==
- Castro de Paz, José Luis & Pérez Jaime, Pena. Ramón Torrado: cine de consumo no franquismo. Consellería de Cultura e Xuventude, 1993.
- De España, Rafael. Directory of Spanish and Portuguese film-makers and films. Greenwood Press, 1994.
