= One Step Forward (film) =

1960 film

- Directed by: Ramón Torrado
- Written by: Víctor López Iglesias; Ramón Torrado; Ramón Agustín Valdivieso
- Cinematography: Francisco Sempere
- Music by: Miguel Asins Arbó
- Production company: Interlagar Films
- Distributed by: Filmayer
- Release date: 31 October 1960
- Running time: 92 minutes
- Country: Spain
- Language: Spanish

One Step Forward (Spanish: Un paso al frente) is a 1960 Spanish comedy film directed by Ramón Torrado. It was shot in Eastmancolor.

== Cast ==
- Manolita Barroso
- Tomás Blanco
- Xan das Bolas
- José Campos
- Germán Cobos
- Rosario Maldonado
- Alfredo Mayo
- Antonio Molino Rojo
- José Nieto
- Julio Núñez
- María del Valle
- Ángel Álvarez

== Bibliography ==
- Francesc Llinàs. Directores de fotografía del cine español. Filmoteca Española, 1989.
