= 1951 Cannes Film Festival =

4th Cannes Film Festival
- Official poster of the 4th Cannes Film Festival illustrated by A.M. Rodicq.
- Location: Cannes, France
- Founded: 1946
- Awards: Grand Prize of the Festival: Miracle in Milan; Miss Julie
- No. of films: 36 (In Competition)
- Festival date: April 3 – 20, 1951
- Website: www.festival-cannes.com

Cannes Film Festival
- 1952 1949

The 4th Cannes Film Festival took place from 3 to 20 April 1951, after not taking place in 1950 due to financial reasons (same reason it did not occur in 1948 either). French author André Maurois served as jury president for the main competition.

The Grand Prize of the Festival, then the festival highest prize, was jointly awarded to Miracle in Milan by Vittorio De Sica and Miss Julie by Alf Sjöberg.

Michèle Morgan, Jean Marais and Jean Cocteau were honoured with the Victoire du cinéma français award.

The festival took place for the first time in April instead of September, to avoid direct competition with the Venice Film Festival.

== Juries ==
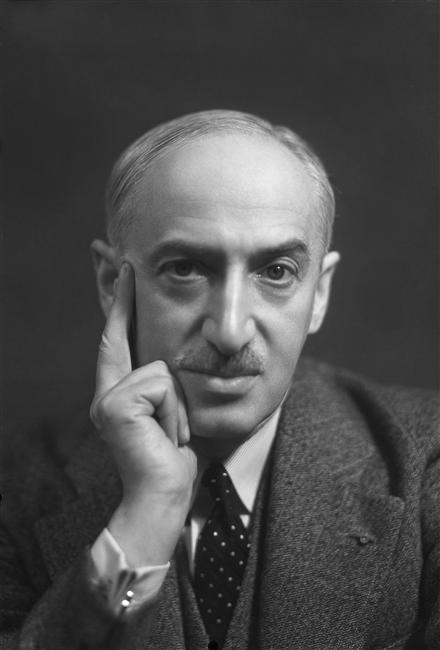
André Maurois, Jury President

=== Main Competition ===
- André Maurois, French author - Jury President
- Suzanne Borel, French diplomat
- Louis Chauvet, French writer and journalist
- Evrard de Rouvre, French
- Guy Desson, French MP official
- Jacques Ibert, French composer
- Gaby Morlay, French actress
- Georges Raguis, French union official
- René Jeanne, French actor, writer and film critic
- Carlo Rim, French filmmaker
- Louis Touchagues, French
- Paul Vialar, French author

==== Substitute members ====
- Alexandre Kamenka, French producer
- Paul Verneyras, French MP official
- Paul Weill, French lawyer

=== Short Films Competition ===
- Marcel De Hubsch, French
- Marcel Ichac, French filmmaker
- Fred Orain, French
- Jean Thevenot, French journalist

== Official Selection ==
=== In Competition ===
The following feature films competed for the Grand Prize of the Festival:

English title	Original title	Director(s)	Production country
All About Eve		Joseph L. Mankiewicz	United States
Bright Victory		Mark Robson	United States
The Browning Version		Anthony Asquith	United Kingdom
Caiçara		Adolfo Celi, Tom Payne, and John Waterhouse	Brazil
Dance of Fire	La Danza del fuego	Daniel Tinayre	Argentina
The Deadly Dreams	Die tödlichen Träume	Paul Martin	West Germany
The Devil Is a Woman	Doña Diabla	Tito Davison	Mexico
Dream of a Cossack	Кавалер Золотой Звезды	Yuli Raizman	Soviet Union
Edward and Caroline	Édouard et Caroline	Jacques Becker	France
The Falling Star	Der Fallende Stern	Harald Braun	West Germany
The Forbidden Christ	Il Cristo proibito	Curzio Malaparte	Italy
Four in a Jeep	Die Vier im Jeep	Leopold Lindtberg	Switzerland
The Honesty of the Lock	La honradez de la cerradura	Luis Escobar	Spain
Los Isleros		Lucas Demare	Argentina
Juliette, or Key of Dreams	Juliette ou La clef des songes	Marcel Carné	France
The Last Mission	Τελευταία Αποστολή	Nikos Tsiforos	Greece
The Marihuana Story	Marihuana	León Klimovsky	Argentina
Miracle in Milan	Miracolo a Milano	Vittorio De Sica	Italy
Mirror of Holland	Spiegel van Holland	Bert Haanstra	Netherlands
Miss Julie	Fröken Julie	Alf Sjöberg	Sweden
Mussorgsky	Мусоргский	Grigori Roshal	Soviet Union
The New China	Освобождённый Китай	Sergei Gerasimov	Soviet Union
Los Olvidados		Luis Buñuel	Mexico
Paris Vice Squad	Identité judiciaire	Hervé Bromberger	France
Path of Hope	Il Cammino della speranza	Pietro Germi	Italy
A Place in the Sun		George Stevens	United States
Reckless	Balarrasa	José Antonio Nieves Conde	Spain
Rumbo		Ramón Torrado	Spain
Side Street Story	Napoli milionaria	Eduardo De Filippo	Italy
The Sin of Harold Diddlebock		Preston Sturges	United States
A Strange Marriage	Különös házasság	Márton Keleti	Hungary
The Tales of Hoffmann		Michael Powell and Emeric Pressburger	United Kingdom
The Trap	Past	Martin Frič	Czechoslovakia
Unvanquished City	Robinson warszawski	Jerzy Zarzyck	Poland
La Virgen gitana		Ramón Torrado	Spain
The Yacht Isabel Arrived This Afternoon	La Balandra Isabel llegó esta tarde	Carlos Hugo Christensen	Argentina, Venezuela

=== Short Films Competition ===
The following short films competed for the Grand Prix du court métrage:

- Así es Madrid directed by Joaquín Soriano
- Azerbaidjan Soviètique directed by F. Kissiliov and M. Dadachev
- Bali, eiland der Goden directed by N. Drakulić
- Bim directed by Albert Lamorisse
- Carnet de plongée directed by Jacques-Yves Cousteau
- Chasse à courre au Pôle Nord directed by Nils Rasmussen
- Colette directed by Yannick Bellon
- Der gelbe Dom directed by Eugen Schuhmacher
- Der goldene Brunnen directed by H. Walter Kolm-Veltee
- Der zee ontrukt directed by Herman van der Horst
- En Sevilla hay una fiesta directed by Joaquín Soriano
- Esthonie Soviètique by V. Tomber and I. Guidine
- Ett hörn i norr directed by Arne Sucksdorff
- Family Portrait directed by Humphrey Jennings
- Festival Time directed by Mohan Dayaram Bhavnani
- French Canada: 1534-1848 directed by Bernard Devlin
- Histoire d'un Facoun Royal directed by István Homoki Nagy
- Homme des oasis directed by Georges Régnier
- Inondations directed by Al Stark and Morten Parker
- L'Algérie humaine directed by Jean-Charles Carlus
- L'autre Moisson directed by René Lucot
- L'Empire directed by Alberto Ancillotti
- L'Eruption de l'Etna directed by Domenico Paolella
- La vie due riz directed by Jinkichi Ohta
- La Voie Est-Ouest directed by K. Gordon Murray
- Lettonie Soviètique directed by F. Kissiliov
- Magnetism directed by John Durst
- New Pioneers directed by Baruch Dienar
- Notre-Dame de Luxembourg directed by Florent Antony
- Oton Joupantchitch by France Kosmač
- The Private Life of a Silk Worm directed by Mohan Dayaram Bhavnani
- Rajasthan N° 1 directed by Mohan Dayaram Bhavnani
- River of Steel directed by Peter Sachs
- Schwarze Gesellen directed by Prof. Walter Hege
- Soutyeska by Pierre Maihrovski
- Suite du de danses Berbères directed by Serge Debecque
- Turay directed by Enrico Gras
- Ukraine en Fleurs directed by Mikhail Slutsky
- Vertigo directed by Eusebio Fernández Ardavín

== Official Awards ==
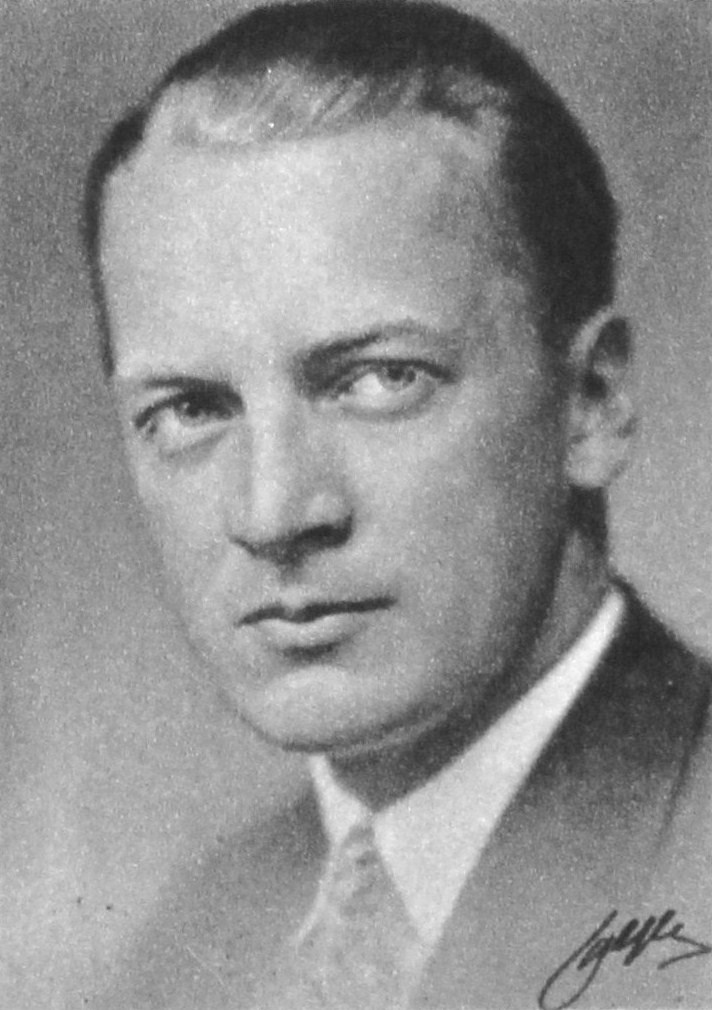
Alf Sjöberg, Grand Prize winner

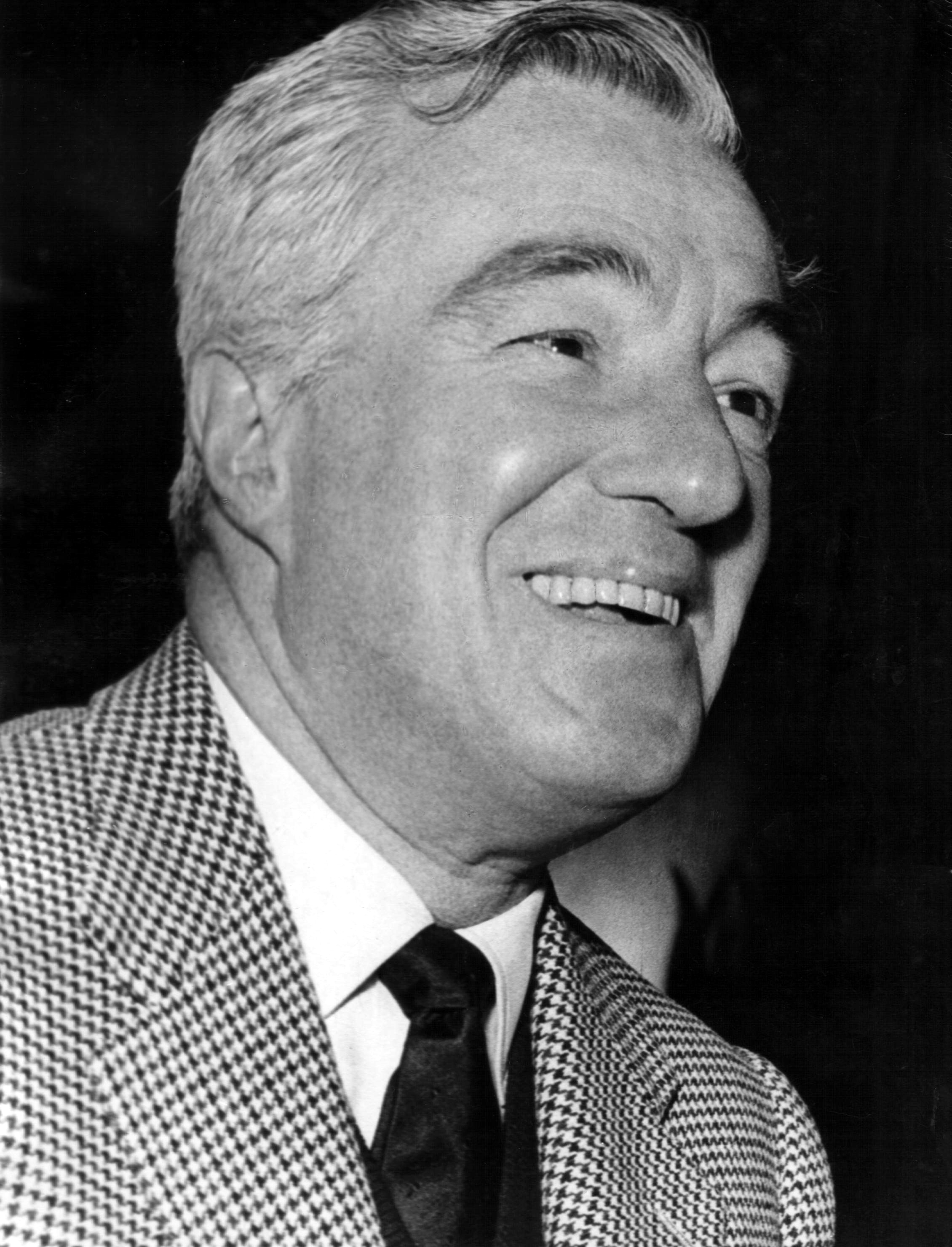
Vittorio De Sica, Grand Prize winner

=== Main Competition ===
- Grand Prize of the Festival:
  - Miss Julie by Alf Sjöberg
  - Miracle in Milan by Vittorio De Sica
- Jury Special Prize: All About Eve by Joseph L. Mankiewicz
- Best Director: Luis Buñuel for Los Olvidados
- Best Actress: Bette Davis for All About Eve
- Best Actor: Michael Redgrave for The Browning Version
- Best Screenplay: Terence Rattigan for The Browning Version
- Best Music: Joseph Kosma for Juliette, or Key of Dreams
- Best Cinematography: José María Beltrán for The Yacht Isabel Arrived This Afternoon
- Best Art Direction: Abram Veksler for Musorgskiy
- Special Award: The Tales of Hoffmann by Michael Powell and Emeric Pressburger

=== Short Films Competition ===
- Prix Spécial du Jury
  - La Voie Est-Ouest by K. Gordon Murray
  - Ukraine en Fleurs by Mikhail Slutsky
  - Lettonie Soviètique by F. Kissiliov
  - Azerbaidjan Soviètique by F. Kissiliov and M. Dadachev
  - Esthonie Soviètique by V. Tomber and I. Guidine
- Grand Prix du Festival International du Film pour le Meilleur Film Scientifique:
  - L'Eruption de l'Etna by Domenico Paolella

== Media ==
- Institut National de l'Audiovisuel: List of award-winners at the 1951 Cannes Festival (commentary in French)
- INA: Awarding of the "Victoire du cinéma français" awards at the opening of the 1951 Festival (commentary in French)
