= La trinca del aire =

The Threesome of the Air
- Spanish: La trinca del aire
- Directed by: Ramón Torrado
- Written by: Ángel Pageo; Adolfo Torrado
- Screenplay by: Ramón Torrado
- Story by: Ramón Torrado; H.S. Valdés
- Starring: Jorge Mistral; Fernando Fernán Gómez; Antonio Casal; Carmelita González; Helga Lina Stern; Fernando F. de Córdoba; Félix Fernández
- Cinematography: Víctor Herrera
- Edited by: Gaby Peñalba
- Music by: Jesús García Leoz
- Production company: Suevia Films - Cesáreo González
- Distributed by: Suevia Films - Cesáreo González; Cesáreo González Producciones Cinematográficas; Excisa S.A.
- Release date: 24 September 1951 (Madrid)
- Running time: 98 min
- Country: Spain

The Threesome of the Air (Spanish: La trinca del aire) is a 1951 Spanish comedy drama film directed by Ramón Torrado and starred by Antonio Casal, Antonio Riquelme and Beni Deus. It was written by Ángel Pageo and Adolfo Torrado.

== Cast ==
- Jorge Mistral as Alberto
- Carmelita González as Irene
- Helga Lina Stern as Nati
- Fernando Aguirre
- Xan das Bolas as Pepiño
- Antonio Casal
- Beni Deus
- Fernando Fernán Gómez
- Fernando Fernández de Córdoba
- Félix Fernández as Teniente Coronel Valera
- Aurora Galisteo
- Jesús Garrido
- Casimiro Hurtado
- María Isbert
- Antonio Molino Rojo
- Mario Moreno
- Fernando Rey
- José Riesgo
- Antonio Riquelme as Vendedor
- Domingo Rivas
- Francisco Rojas
- Rosario Royo
- Vicente Soler
- Carmen Sánchez
- José Vivó
