= Let's Make the Impossible! =

1958 film

- Directed by: Rafael Gil
- Written by: Joaquín Calvo Sotelo; Miguel Mihura; Rafael Gil
- Starring: Paquita Rico
- Cinematography: Alfredo Fraile
- Edited by: José Antonio Rojo
- Release date: 1 September 1958
- Running time: 111 minutes
- Country: Spain
- Language: Spanish

Let's Make the Impossible! (Spanish: ¡Viva lo imposible!) is a 1958 Spanish comedy film adapted from the play "¡Viva lo imposible! o el contable de las estrellas", by Miguel Mihura and Joaquín Calvo Sotelo, and directed by Rafael Gil. It was entered into the 8th Berlin International Film Festival.

== Cast ==
- Paquita Rico as Palmira López
- Manolo Morán as Don Sabino López (as Manolo Moran)
- Miguel Gila as Adriani
- Julio Núñez as Eusebio López (as Julio Nuñez)
- Julia Caba Alba as Rosa
- José Marco Davó as Don Emilio (as Jose Marco Davo)
- Fernando Sancho as John
- Raúl Cancio as Rodolfo (as Raul Cancio)
- Vicky Lagos as Margot
- Ángel Ter as Zozof (as Angel Ter)
- Tony Soler as Pilar
- Mario Morales
- Yelena Samarina as Eloísa (as Elena Samarina)
- Jesús Narro as (as Jesus Narro)

== Bibliography ==
- de España, Rafael. Directory of Spanish and Portuguese film-makers and films. Greenwood Press, 1994.
