= Good News (1954 film) =

1954 film

- Directed by: Eduardo Manzanos Brochero
- Written by: José García Nieto; Eduardo Manzanos Brochero; Manuel Pilares
- Cinematography: Ricardo Torres
- Edited by: Antonio Gimeno
- Music by: Regino Sainz de la Maza
- Production company: Unión Films
- Distributed by: C.E.A. Distribución
- Release date: 5 April 1954
- Running time: 75 minutes
- Country: Spain
- Language: Spanish

Good News (Spanish: Buenas noticias) is a 1954 Spanish comedy film directed by Eduardo Manzanos Brochero.

== Director ==
Good News was directed by Eduardo Manzanos Brochero (10 November 1919 – 16 October 1987), a Spanish film director, screenwriter, and producer born in Madrid. Good News (Buenas noticias) was only his second feature film as director, following Cabaret (1953). In 1954, the same year as this film's release, Manzanos founded his own production company, Unión Films, through which he went on to produce over forty films and write more than fifty screenplays. He is perhaps best known internationally for his later work in Spaghetti Western co-productions, including Apocalypse Joe (1970).

== Production ==
The film was produced under the original Spanish title Buenas noticias and had a runtime of 75 minutes. The screenplay was written by Manzanos himself, who in the film credits is billed under his combined surname as "Eduardo M. Brochero."

== Notable cast members ==
Among the cast, José Luis Ozores became one of the most popular comic actors in Spanish cinema of the 1950s and 1960s, and was a member of the prominent Ozores family of Spanish entertainers. Xan das Bolas (born Juan Martínez Torner) was a well-known Galician comic actor and cabaret performer who appeared frequently in Spanish film productions of this era.

== Cast ==
- José Alburquerque
- Manuel Arbó
- Xan das Bolas
- Dolores Bremón
- Faustino Bretaño
- José Capilla
- Federico Chacón
- Juan Domenech
- Llebe Donay
- El Chirri
- Máximo Ferrero
- Antonio Fornis
- María Luz Galicia
- María de la Rosa
- Julio Montijano
- Antonio Moreno
- Conchita Muñoz
- Francisco Nuño
- José Luis Ozores
- Teófilo Palou
- Miguel Pastor
- José Manuel Ramirez
- Joaquín Regález
- José G. Rey
- Matilde Roldán
- Cándido Sol

== Bibliography ==
- Bentley, Bernard. A Companion to Spanish Cinema. Boydell & Brewer 2008.
