= Miguel Gila =

Spanish comedian and actor (1919–2001)

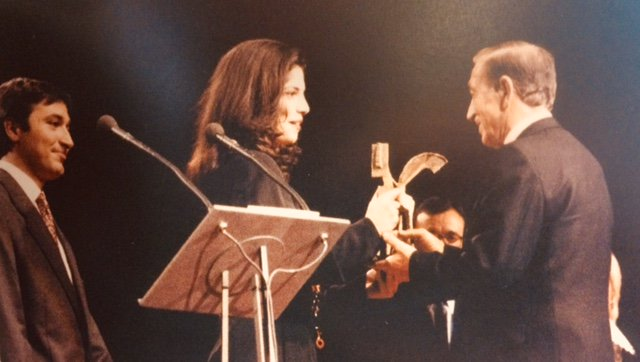
- Gila during Ondas Award in 1993
- Born: Miguel Gila Cuesta; 12 March 1919; Madrid, Spain
- Died: 13 July 2001 (aged 82); Barcelona, Spain
- Occupations: Comedian; Actor
- Years active: 1954-2001

Miguel Gila Cuesta (12 March 1919 – 13 July 2001) was a Spanish comedian and actor. He appeared in 27 films and television shows between 1954 and 1993, and became famous in Spain and Latin America with his comic monologues.

He starred in the film ¡Viva lo imposible!, which was entered into the 8th Berlin International Film Festival. He previously spent some time incarcerated in Valsequillo (until May 1939) and Zamora concentration camps, and later in Madrid prisons like Yeserías, Santa Rita, Carabanchel and, finally, Torrijos, because of having joined the defeated side in the Spanish Civil War.

== Selected filmography ==
- The Devil Plays the Flute (1953)
- Adventures of the Barber of Seville (1954)
- The Louts (1954)
- Uncle Hyacynth (1956)
- Let's Make the Impossible! (1958)
- A Nearly Decent Girl (1963)
