= Nothing Less Than an Archangel =

- Directed by: Jaime D'Ors; Antonio del Amo; Esteban Madruga
- Written by: Juan Luis Calleja
- Produced by: Carlos Serrano de Osma
- Cinematography: Juan Mariné
- Edited by: Mercedes Alonso
- Music by: Miguel Asins Arbó
- Production company: Nervión Films
- Distributed by: Cinedía
- Release date: 17 June 1960
- Running time: 82 minutes
- Country: Spain
- Language: Spanish

Nothing Less Than an Archangel (Spanish: Nada menos que un arkángel) is a 1960 Spanish comedy film directed by Jaime D'Ors, Antonio del Amo and Esteban Madruga.

== Cast ==
- Manuel Aroca
- Inocencio Barbán
- Roberto Camardiel
- Félix Fernández
- Elisa Hernandez
- Guillermo Hidalgo
- José Isbert as Don Fabián
- Archibald L. Lyall
- José Moratalla
- Enrique Núñez
- Pedro Oliver
- Amelia Ortas
- Marisa Prado as La joven Americana
- José Riesgo
- Santiago Rivero
- Luis Roses
- Conrado San Martín as Paco
- Antonio Vela as Boy with glasses in seaport with the tractor

== Bibliography ==
- de España, Rafael. Directory of Spanish and Portuguese film-makers and films. Greenwood Press, 1994.
