= Félix Fernández (actor) =

Spanish actor (1897–1966)

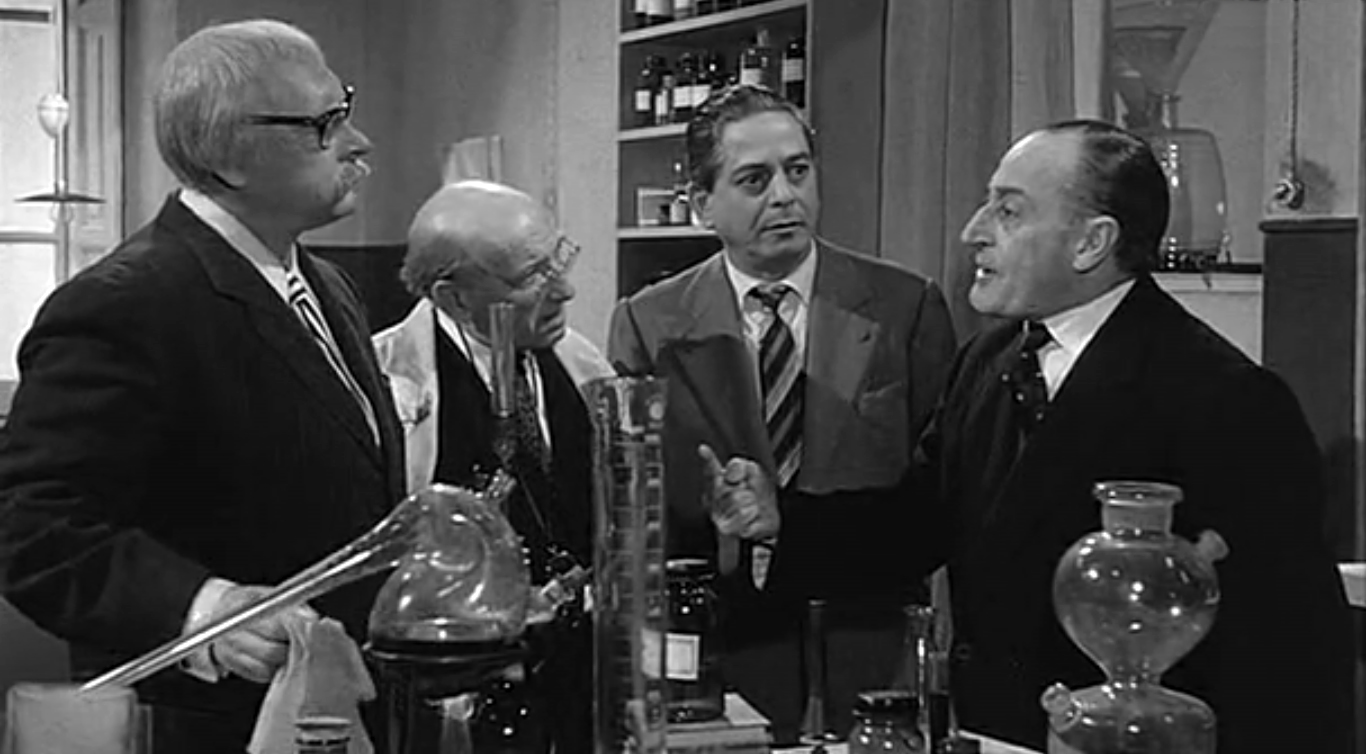
- Armando Calvo as fake inspector McMillan, Felix Fernandez as Dr. Ascione, Enzo Turco as La Nocella and Totò as Commissioner Di Sapio in The Thieves (1959).
- Born: Félix Fernández García; 26 September 1897; Cangas de Onís (Asturias), Spain
- Died: 4 July 1966 (aged 68); Madrid, Spain
- Occupation: Actor
- Years active: 1942-1969

Félix Fernández García (26 September 1897 – 4 July 1966) was a Spanish actor. He appeared in more than one hundred films from 1942 to 1969.

== Biography ==
He was born on September 26, 1897, in Cangas de Onís, Asturias.He was the son of Silverio Fernández Iglesias, an industrialist from Cangas, Pontevedra, and Micaela García García, from Las Salas, León. In 1916, he made his debut as a theater actor during a tour of Argentina. After returning to Spain, he worked with the theater companies of María Guerrero and Catalina Bárcena. In 1931, he moved to Paris, where he worked until 1934 as a voice actor at the Joinville studios, an activity he continued in Spain. After the Spanish Civil War, he began a long career in cinema, appearing in more than 200 films.

Magnificent in all his roles, he often played comic characters. His roles with director Luis García Berlanga stand out, such as the con man dressed as a Roman in Esa pareja feliz (co-directed by Rafael Bardem), the doctor in Bienvenido Mr. Marshall, and also the doctor in Los jueves, milagro.

He married on June 17, 1929, in the parish church of San Miguel, in Vitoria-Gasteiz, with the voice actress Irene Guerrero de Luna, whose real name was Irene Texidor Mendo (Madrid, May 18, 1911-Madrid, March 23, 1996).

He died in Valdetorres de Jarama, Madrid, of a heart attack while filming the movie El tesoro de O'Hara Padre (Father O'Hara's Treasure). After finishing one of the scenes, and not reappearing when the director called “cut,” the other actors rushed to his aid when they saw him lying on the floor, but there was nothing they could do for him. He died on July 4, 1966, although some sources erroneously cite July 9 as his date of death.

He is buried in the Cementerio de la Almudena in Madrid.

== Filmography ==
Year	Title	Role	Notes
1942	The White Dove	Licenciado	
1943	El secreto de la mujer muerta		
1943	Cinnamon Flower	Don Joaquín	
1943	House of Cards	Editor	
1943	Se vende un palacio		
1944	Mi fantástica esposa		
1944	Lessons in Good Love		
1944	Te quiero para mí	Povedano	
1944	Yo no me caso		
1944	The Nail	Bizquerra	
1944	Lola Montes		
1944	Macarena	Tito	
1944	El rey de las finanzas	Pastona	
1945	El destino se disculpa	Dueño de la mantequería	
1945	Noche decisiva	Pedro	
1945	Castanet		
1945	Thirsty Land		
1945	Bamboo	Don Prieto Suárez	Uncredited
1945	La luna vale un millón	Miembro consejo de administración	Uncredited
1945	Cero en conducta		
1946	The Prodigal Woman	Secretario	
1946	Unknown Path	Jefe del refugio	
1946	El crimen de Pepe Conde	Cura	
1946	Mar abierto	Tío Paquito	
1946	The Emigrant	Don Vicente	
1947	Por el gran premio		
1947	Las inquietudes de Shanti Andía	Doctor Cornelius	
1947	Héroes del 95	Independentist	
1947	Reina santa	Barredo	
1947	Serenata española	Señor Agapito	
1947	Dulcinea		
1947	Dos mujeres y un rostro		
1947	The Faith	Pelegrín	
1947	Lady in Ermine	Job	
1947	The Princess of the Ursines	Cochero	
1947	Fuenteovejuna	Clérigo	
1947	2 cuentos para 2	Carlos	
1947	Luis Candelas, el ladrón de Madrid	Lobo	
1947	Don Quixote	Second Innkeeper	
1948	Anchor Button	Comandante segundo	
1948	Confidences	Doctor Elías	
1948	Revelación		
1948	Guest of Darkness	Tadeo	
1948	Madness for Love	Mesonero	
1948	Las aguas bajan negras	Martillán	
1948	La cigarra		
1948	The Sunless Street	Basilio	
1948	Mare Nostrum	Recepcionista hotel	
1949	Sabela de Cambados	Don Antonio	
1949	¡Olé torero!		
1949	La manigua sin dios		
1949	Currito of the Cross	Joaquín González 'Copita'	
1949	Noche de Reyes		
1949	Just Any Woman	Julio	
1949	They Always Return at Dawn	Don José	Uncredited
1949	The Duchess of Benameji	Esteban Lara, bandolero	
1949	Peace	Marino	
1950	Pequeñeces...	Frasquito	
1950	Alhambra		
1950	La sombra iluminada	Lolo	
1950	Agustina of Aragon		
1950	El centauro		
1950	Apollo Theatre	Viñot	
1951	La Virgen gitana	Miguel	
1951	The Black Crown	El jardinero	
1951	El Negro que tenía el alma blanca	Mucio Cortadel	
1951	La trinca del aire	Teniente Coronel Valera	
1951	Our Lady of Fatima	Marto	
1951	The Great Galeoto	Enciso	
1952	Come Die My Love	Hombre del catalejo	
1952	From Madrid to Heaven	Sergio	
1952	Estrella of the Sierra Morena	Padre Francisco	
1952	Feather in the Wind	Peluche	
1952	The Song of Sister Maria	Padre José	
1952	Imperial Violets		Uncredited
1952	La laguna negra	Sospechoso	
1953	Welcome Mr. Marshall!	Don Emiliano, el médico	
1953	That Happy Couple	Rafa	
1953	The Cheerful Caravan		
1953	Airport	M. Lacombre	
1953	Condemned to Hang	Don Fernando	
1953	Gypsy Curse		
1953	Condemned	Tabernero	
1953	Nobody Will Know	Arturo López, el sastre	
1953	Vertigo	Don Cosme	
1954	Love in a Hot Climate	El Chato	
1954	Como la tierra	Larrea	
1954	An Impossible Crime	Antonio Olmeda	
1954	Love on Wheels	Don Eduardo	
1954	Cañas y barro	Tío Paloma	
1955	Nosotros dos	Old drunkard	
1955	Un día perdido	Artista	
1955	Pride	Obrero	
1956	Esa voz es una mina	Don Hipólito	
1956	¡Aquí hay petróleo!	Don Fausto	
1956	Curra Veleta	Don Serapio	
1956	The Rocket from Calabuch	Don Félix, the Priest	
1956	Viaje de novios	Julio Bermejo Alcáraz 'Julito'	
1956	Minutos antes		
1957	Susana y yo	Tío de Susana	
1957	Miracles of Thursday	Don Evaristo	
1957	Femmine tre volte	Medico	
1957	Il maestro...	Porter	
1957	Ángeles sin cielo	Padre Juan	
1958	Love and Chatter	Giovanni Salviati	
1958	The Tenant	Señor Madruga	
1958	The Violet Seller	Dueño local	
1958	El hombre del paraguas blanco	Traca	
1958	L'uomo dai calzoni corti		
1958	Ana dice sí	Don Julián	
1958	Ya tenemos coche	Don Baldomero	
1958	El ruiseñor de las cumbres		
1958	Entierro de un funcionario en primavera		
1959	A Luz Vem do Alto	Manuel, the priest	
1959	Bombas para la paz	Don Carlos	
1959	Échame a mí la culpa		
1959	The Thieves	Dr. Ascione	
1959	Y después del cuplé		
1959	A Girl Against Napoleon	El Dancairo	
1959	La vida alrededor	Charlatán	
1959	College Boarding House	Don Ventura	
1959	Las dos y media y... veneno	Don Senén	
1960	Juanito	Doctor Agapito	
1960	Un ángel tuvo la culpa	Sacerdote	
1960	The Showgirl	Paulino Castro	
1960	La rana verde		
1960	Nothing Less Than an Archangel		
1960	Le tre eccetera del colonnello		
1960	The Football Lottery		
1960	The Two Rivals		
1960	Pelusa		
1961	Hay alguien detrás de la puerta	Félix	
1961	The Colossus of Rhodes	Carete	
1961	La cumparsita	Avispado	
1961	Lovely Memory		
1961	Plácido	Pobre en casa de Galán	
1961	Y el cuerpo sigue aguantando		
1962	Abuelita Charlestón	Hermógenes	
1962	Martes y trece	The Portuguese	
1962	Aprendiendo a morir	Jeremías	
1962	Los que no fuimos a la guerra	Don Amalio	
1962	Sabían demasiado	Torcuato, el sereno	
1962	Savage Guns	Paco	
1962	Terrible Sheriff	Barnun, Chicken Farmer	
1962	Los culpables	Comisario Ruiz	
1962	Vampiresas 1930	Producer	
1962	Rogelia	Don Heliodoro	
1963	Magic Fountain	Nicolás	
1963	Plaza de oriente	Don Francisco	
1963	Los derechos de la mujer	Cura	
1963	Shéhérazade		
1963	The Sign of the Coyote	Don Goyo	
1963	La becerrada	Ruiz	
1963	The Magnificent Adventurer		
1963	The Executioner	Organista	
1963	La batalla del domingo	Dado	
1963	The Fair of the Dove	Don Sebastián	
1963	The Daughters of Helena	Don Fabián	
1963	Benigno, hermano mío		
1964	Three for a Robbery		
1964	El espontáneo	De la calle de la Victoria	
1964	Tintin and the Blue Oranges	le professeur Tournesol	
1965	Crime on a Summer Morning	Le docteur Fabregas	Uncredited
1965	Julieta engaña a Romeo	Antonio, padre de Julita	
1965	Agent 077: Mission Bloody Mary		
1965	La colina de los pequeños diablos		
1965	El marqués	Paco	
1966	Dio, come ti amo!	Angela Grandfather	
1966	Lola, espejo oscuro	Roberto	
1966	Clarines y campanas		
1966	Algunas lecciones de amor	Don Félix	
1966	A Few Dollars for Django		Uncredited
1966	Fray Torero	Hermano Saturio	
1969	Un hombre solo		(final film role)
