= Paquita Rico =

Spanish actress

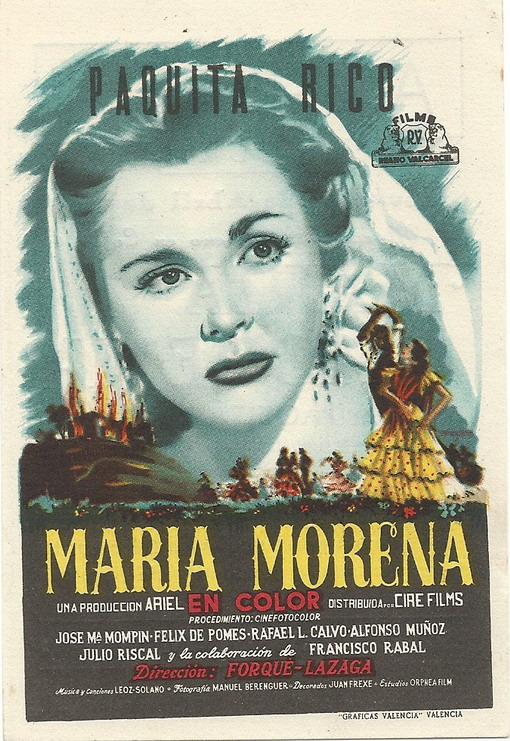
- María Morena movie, 1951
- Born: Francisca Rico Martínez; 13 October 1929; Seville, Spain
- Died: 9 July 2017 (aged 87); Seville, Spain
- Occupations: Actress, singer
- Years active: 1948–2011
- Spouses: Juan Ordóñez Araújo (m. 1960; died 1965); Guillermo Arsenio Arocha Fernández (m. 1968; died 2002)

Francisca Rico Martínez (13 October 1929 – 9 July 2017), better known as Paquita Rico, was a Spanish film actress and singer. She appeared in 30 films between 1948 and 1983. She starred in the film Let's Make the Impossible!, which was entered into the 8th Berlin International Film Festival.

She died from natural causes on 9 July 2017 at the age of 87.

== Selected filmography ==
Year	Title	Role	Notes
1948	A Toast for Manolete	Dolores	
1949	Rumbo	Dulcenombre	
1951	María Morena	María Morena	
1951	La Virgen gitana	Carmelilla	
1953	The Cheerful Caravan		
1954	Malvaloca	Malvaloca	
1955	Sighs of Triana	Reyes	
1956	Curra Veleta	Curra Veleta	
1957	Love in Jamaica	Olivia de Montana	
1958	Let's Make the Impossible!	Palmira López	
1959	Where Are You Going, Alfonso XII?	María de las Mercedes	
1961	Savage Guns	Franchea	
1962	The Balcony of the Moon	Pili	
