= Love on Wheels (1954 film) =

1954 film

- Directed by: Ramón Torrado
- Written by: Antonio Guzmán Merino; Ramón Torrado
- Produced by: Benito Perojo; Miguel Tudela
- Starring: Carmen Morell; Pepe Blanco; José Isbert
- Cinematography: Antonio L. Ballesteros
- Edited by: Gaby Peñalba
- Music by: José Ruiz de Azagra
- Production company: Producciones Benito Perojo
- Distributed by: CIFESA
- Release date: 13 September 1954
- Running time: 87 minutes
- Country: Spain
- Language: Spanish

Love on Wheels (Spanish: Amor sobre ruedas) is a 1954 Spanish musical comedy film directed by Ramón Torrado and starring Carmen Morell, Pepe Blanco and José Isbert. It was shot at the CEA Studios in Madrid. The film's sets were designed by the art directors Gil Parrondo and Luis Pérez Espinosa.

== Synopsis ==
A taxi driver enters a competition for amateur singers. While at the radio station he encounters a famous singer and falls in love with her.

== Cast ==
- Carmen Morell as Rosario Banderas Flores
- Pepe Blanco as Pepe García
- José Isbert as Representante Carmona
- Félix Fernández as Don Eduardo
- Xan das Bolas as Cristóbal
- Antonio Riquelme as Viajero enamorado
- Tony Soler as Patro
- Alicia Altabella as Lina
- Casimiro Hurtado as Bombero
- Carlos Díaz de Mendoza as Gerente
- Luis Sánchez Polack as Director artístico
- Joaquín Portillo 'Top' as Galloso
- Emilio Segura as Locutor de radio
- Julia Delgado Caro as abuela de Pepe
- Manuel Guitián as Pasajero taxi
- Antonio Ozores as Sandoval
- Aníbal Vela as Redactor jefe

== Bibliography ==
- Castro de Paz, José Luis & Pérez Jaime, Pena. Ramón Torrado: cine de consumo no franquismo. Consellería de Cultura e Xuventude, 1993.
- De España, Rafael. Directory of Spanish and Portuguese film-makers and films. Greenwood Press, 1994.
