= Pilar Gómez Ferrer =

Spanish actress

- Born: 7 February 1910; Toledo, Spain
- Died: 27 September 2009 (aged 99); Madrid, Spain
- Occupation: Actor
- Years active: 1952–1977

Pilar Gómez Ferrer (7 February 1910 – 27 September 2009) was a Spanish actress. She appeared in more than one hundred films from 1952 to 1977.

== Biography ==
She was born in Toledo, Spain, the daughter of actors Francisco Gómez Ferrer and Adelina Gómez Uzal. Pilar Gómez Gómez was one of the most prolific actresses in the history of Spanish cinema: she made her big screen debut in 1952 and appeared in more than 120 films during her 25-year career. She is remembered as the star of several Italian-Spanish co-productions, such as Toto in Madrid.

On April 27, 1932, she married actor and later talent agent Francisco Luna Baños (1897-1985) in the parish church of San Nicolás in Madrid. They had one daughter, Adelina Luna Gómez (better known as Delia Luna), who followed in her mother's footsteps. She retired from the world of cinema in 1977 and died in Madrid at the age of 99.

== Selected filmography ==
Year	Title	Role	Notes
1952	Estrella of the Sierra Morena		
1954	Malvaloca		
1956	We Thieves Are Honourable		
1957	Desert Warrior		
1959	Toto in Madrid		
1963	Nunca pasa nada		
1963	Los Guerrilleros		
1963	La becerrada	Rafaelita's mother	
1964	The Girl in Mourning		
1972	White Sister		
