= The Girl at the Inn =

1951 film

- Directed by: Ramón Torrado
- Written by: José Palma; Ramón Perelló; Ramón Torrado
- Starring: Lola Flores; Manolo Caracol; Manuel Requena
- Cinematography: Manuel Berenguer
- Edited by: Gaby Peñalba
- Music by: Genaro Monreal
- Production company: Suevia Films
- Distributed by: Suevia Films
- Release date: 12 November 1951
- Running time: 80 minutes
- Country: Spain
- Language: Spanish

The Girl at the Inn (Spanish: La niña de la venta) is a 1951 Spanish musical comedy film directed by Ramón Torrado and starring Lola Flores, Manolo Caracol and Manuel Requena. In Cádiz a small cabaret is used as a cover for smuggling.

The film's art direction was by Enrique Alarcón. The film was shot in the Sancti Petri fishing village and harbour in Chiclana de la Frontera.

== Cast ==
- Lola Flores as Reyes
- Manolo Caracol as Don Rafael
- Manuel Requena as Charanguito
- Rubén Rojo as Juan Luis / Carlos de Osuna
- Xan das Bolas as Dimas
- Erika Morgan as Rachel
- José Nieto as Captain 'Tiburon'
- Raúl Cancio as Sargento Guardia Civil
- Manuel Morao as Guitarist
- Carmen Flores as Gypsy
- Concha López Silva as Fortune Teller
- Francisco Aguilera
- José Arroyo
- Félix Briones
- Luis Domínguez Luna
- Manuel Ortega
- Rafael Ortega
- Ángel Sevillano
