= Malvaloca (1954 film) =

- Directed by: Ramón Torrado
- Written by: Joaquín Álvarez Quintero (play); Serafín Álvarez Quintero (play); Francisco Naranjo; Rafael Narbona; Ramón Torrado
- Produced by: Miguel Herrero
- Starring: Paquita Rico; Peter Damon; Antonio Riquelme; Julia Caba Alba
- Cinematography: Alfredo Fraile
- Edited by: Gaby Peñalba
- Music by: Juan Quintero
- Production company: Producciones Cinematográficas Ariel
- Distributed by: CIFESA
- Release date: 24 April 1954
- Running time: 95 minutes
- Country: Spain
- Language: Spanish

Malvaloca is a 1954 Spanish drama film directed by Ramón Torrado and starring Paquita Rico, Peter Damon and Antonio Riquelme. It is an adaptation of the 1912 play of the same title about a fallen woman from Málaga who eventually redeems herself.

== Cast ==
- Paquita Rico as Malvaloca
- Peter Damon as Leonardo
- Antonio Riquelme as Silbío
- Julia Caba Alba as Doña Enriqueta
- Emilio Segura as Salvador
- Arturo Marín as Diego
- Julia Lajos as Pastelera
- Rosario Royo as Teresona
- Xan das Bolas as Barrabás
- Pilar Muñoz as Juana
- Francisco Bernal as Trabajador de la fundición
- Pilar Gómez Ferrer as Señora cotilla
- María Cuevas
- Matilde Artero as Hermana Consuelo
- Félix Briones as Tabernero
- Julia Delgado Caro as Madre Superiora
- Alfonso Jorge
- Luis García Guerrero
- Emilio Santiago as Hombre que pide prestada la mosca
- Luis River
- Manuel Guitián
- Ana María Ventura
- Miguel Ligero as Jeromo
- Lina Yegros as Hermana Piedad

== Bibliography ==
- Peiró, Eva Woods (2012). White Gypsies: Race and Stardom in Spanish Musical Films. U of Minnesota Press. ISBN 978-0-8166-4584-8.
