= The Evil Forest =

1951 film

- Directed by: Daniel Mangrané; Carlos Serrano de Osma
- Written by: Daniel Mangrané; Carlos Serrano de Osma; Francisco Naranjo; José Antonio Pérez Torreblanca
- Produced by: Daniel Mangrané
- Starring: Gustavo Rojo
- Cinematography: Cecilio Paniagua
- Edited by: Antonio Cánovas
- Release date: 21 December 1951
- Running time: 95 minutes
- Country: Spain
- Language: Spanish

The Evil Forest (Spanish: Parsifal) is a 1951 Spanish drama film directed by Daniel Mangrané. It was entered into the 1952 Cannes Film Festival.

== Plot ==
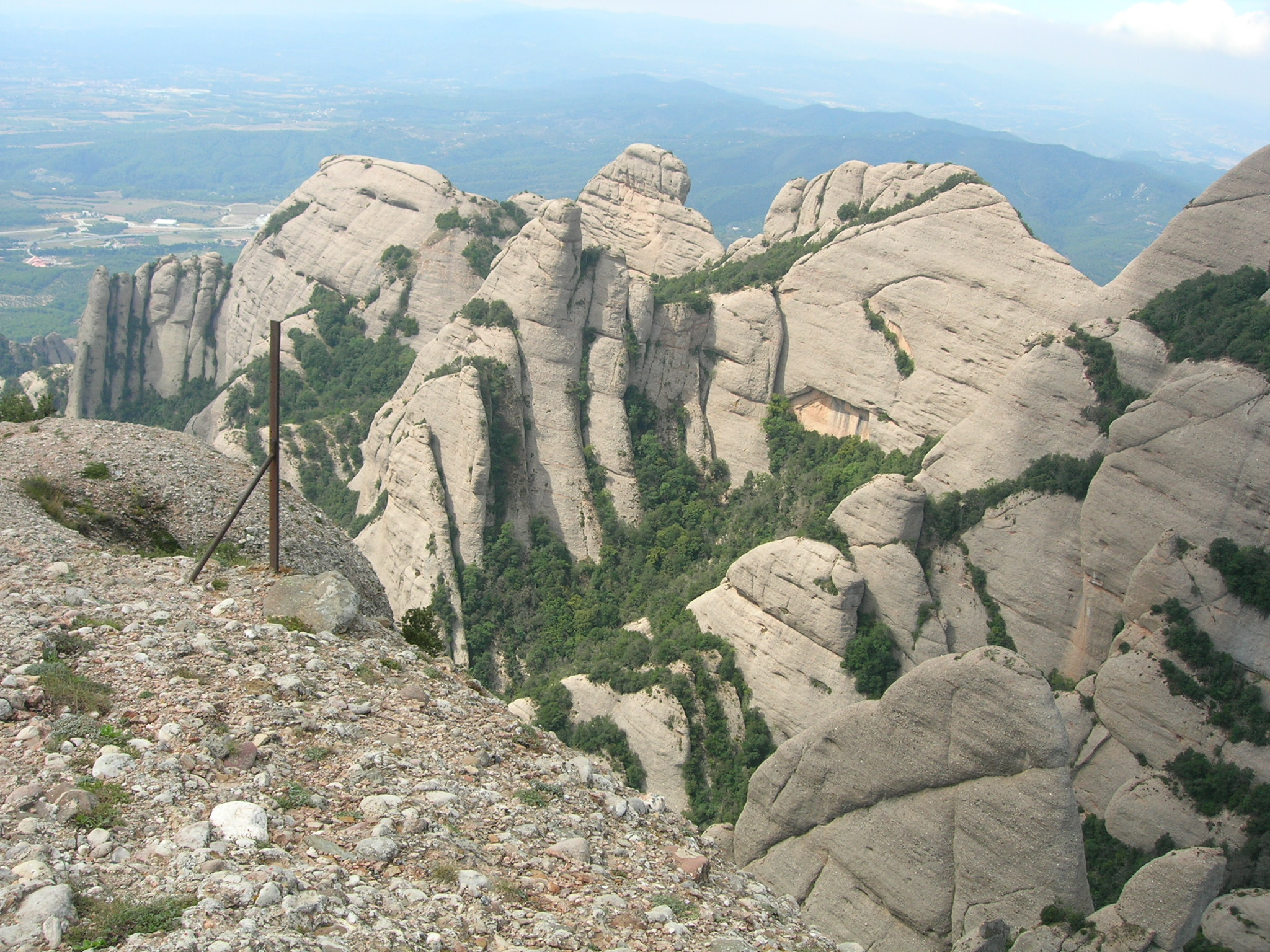
The rocks of Montserrat.

During World War III, two soldiers enter a ruined building. They find an old book containing the story of Parsifal.

The story is located in Spain during the barbarian invasions. The warrior Roderico, tired of fighting, stops Klingsor from abusing a captive woman. Klingsor challenges him as a coward before the barbarian king who holds the holy lance. In the fight, Roderico wins but refuses to kill Klingsor, who treacherously wounds him. Roderico leaves with the captive. The king disapproves of treachery. Klingsor challenges him and becomes the king of the barbarians. He devotes himself to magic.

After Roderico's death, the captive bears a boy, Parsifal. She tries to find the grail but cannot. They refuge in Montserrat. A troop of grail knights passes and encourages the young child. When looking for Parsifal, his mother falls to her death. Parsifal is bred by wolves in the mountain.

As a young man armed with his father's bow, Parsifal meets the knights again. He also meets Kundria, Klingsor's daughter, the first woman he meets after his mother. He watches Kundria seduce Amfortas, who is wounded by Klingsor. Klingsor sends his virgin daughter to seduce Parsifal, but he refuses. She repents and leaves.

Parsifal clashes with Klingsor's tribe. A barbarian dwarf changes sides and brings the knights. Parsifal and Klingsor fight a single combat. Like his father, Parsifal wins and Klingsor tries to kill treacherously. The dwarf kills him with Roderico's bow.

Parsifal quests helping the weak against the oppressors. He confronts the seven capital sins in the guise of young women. He resists temptation and proceeds in his quest. Having smelled the flower of pride, his good deeds are however tainted.

Years pass. Parsifal's feats are no longer out of pride. Amfortas suffers of his wound and the grail is kept in a case. On Good Friday, Gurnemancio meets an armed knight. He reproaches him, and the knight disarms, revealing Parsifal with Christ-like beard and mane. Parsifal kneels before the lance and his sword, that are laid in a cross shape. Kundria has led a life of repentance and washes Parsifal's feet with her hair, like Mary of Bethany did to Jesus. He baptises her. Entering the grail cave, he touches Amfortas with the lance. A dove returns to fly over the grail.

In the frame story, the soldiers close the book and watch an old priest leaving a chalice on the altar of a ruined church while supernatural light shines on it.

== Cast ==
- Gustavo Rojo - Parsifal
- Ludmilla Tchérina - The Woman (Kundria / Parsifal's mother)
- Félix de Pomés - Klingsor
- Jesús Varela - The Dwarf
- Ángel Jordán - Roderico
- José Luis Hernández - Parsifal - as a young boy
- Teresa Planell - The Old Woman
- Alfonso Estela - Anfortas
- Carlo Tamberlani - Gurnemancio
- José Bruguera - Titurel
- Ricardo Fusté - Alisan
- Nuria Alfonso - Rage
- Tony Domenech - Gluttony
- Rosa Monero - Sloth
- Elena Montevar - Envy
- Carmen Zaro - Greed
- Carmen de Lirio - Pride
- Josefina Ramos - Lust
