= La Virgen gitana =

1951 film

- Directed by: Ramón Torrado
- Written by: Francisco Naranjo; Ramón Torrado
- Produced by: Saturnino Huguet; Daniel Mangrané
- Starring: Paquita Rico
- Cinematography: Manuel Berenguer
- Edited by: Antonio Cánovas
- Release date: 24 March 1951
- Running time: 92 minutes
- Country: Spain
- Language: Spanish

La Virgen gitana is a 1951 Spanish comedy film directed by Ramón Torrado. It was entered into the 1951 Cannes Film Festival.

== Plot ==
Carmen (Paquita Rico) is a gypsy orphan girl. One day she meets painter Eduardo Miranda (Alfredo Mayo), who asks her to pose for him for a picture of Debla, the gypsy virgin. She falls in love with the painter, not knowing he is married. But soon people begin to talk.

== Cast ==
- Paquita Rico as Carmelilla
- Alfredo Mayo as Eduardo Miranda
- Lina Yegros as Cristina Álvarez de Miranda
- Lola Ramos as Reyes
- Alfonso Estela as Vicente
- Félix Fernández as Miguel
- Modesto Cid as Agustín
- María Severini
- Rosa Fontsere (as Rosa Fontseré)
- Camino Delgado
- Pedro Mascaró
- Ana Morera
- Fortunato García as Juez
