= Fog and Sun =

- Directed by: José María Forqué
- Written by: Horacio Ruiz de la Fuente (play); Pedro Lazaga; José María Forqué
- Produced by: Miguel Herrero
- Starring: Modesto Cid
- Cinematography: Juan Mariné
- Edited by: María Rosa Ester
- Music by: Jesús García Leoz
- Production company: Producciones Cinematográficas Ariel
- Release date: 13 December 1951
- Running time: 79 minutes
- Country: Spain
- Language: Spanish

Fog and Sun (Spanish:Niebla y sol) is a 1951 Spanish film directed by José María Forqué.

== Cast ==
- Antonio
- Xan das Bolas
- Modesto Cid
- Roberto Font
- Mara Jerez
- Francisco Melgares
- José María Mompín
- Carlos Muñoz
- Consuelo de Nieva
- María Dolores Pradera
- Rosario
- Asunción Sancho
- Julio Sanjuán
- Aníbal Vela

== Bibliography ==
- Mira, Alberto. Historical Dictionary of Spanish Cinema. Scarecrow Press, 2010.
