= María Morena =

1951 film

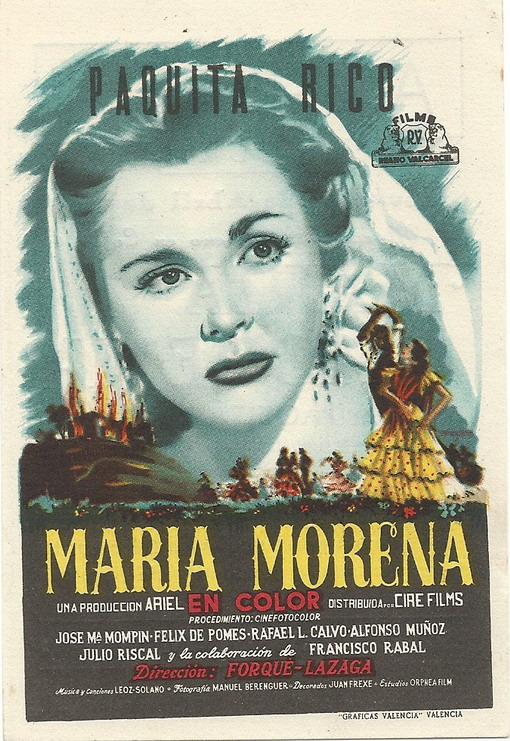
- Directed by: José María Forqué; Pedro Lazaga
- Written by: Francisco Naranjo; Pedro Lazaga; José María Forqué
- Produced by: Miguel Herrero; Juan N. Solórzano
- Starring: Paquita Rico
- Cinematography: Manuel Berenguer
- Edited by: María Rosa Ester
- Release date: 1951
- Running time: 75 minutes
- Country: Spain
- Language: Spanish

María Morena is a 1951 Spanish drama film directed by José María Forqué and Pedro Lazaga. It was entered into the 1952 Cannes Film Festival.

== Cast ==
- Paquita Rico - María Morena
- José María Mompín - Fernando (as José Mª Mompin)
- Rafael Luis Calvo - Cristóbal
- Félix de Pomés - Juan Montoya
- Alfonso Muñoz - Don Chirle
- Consuelo de Nieva - María Pastora
- Purita Alonso
- Julio Riscal - Relámpago
- Francisco Rabal - El Sevillano
- Luis Induni - Romero
- Carlos Ronda - Sargento
- Modesto Cid - Primer anciano en taberna
