= Daniel Mangrané =

Spanish film director

- Born: 8 March 1910; Tortosa, Spain
- Died: 27 December 1985 (aged 75); Barcelona, Spain
- Occupations: Film producer Screenwriter; Film director
- Years active: 1936–1954

Daniel Mangrané (8 March 1910 – 27 December 1985) was a Spanish film producer, screenwriter and film director.

== Selected filmography ==
- Rumbo (1949 – produced)
- La Virgen gitana (1951 – produced)
- The Evil Forest (1951 – directed, produced)
