= Raúl Cancio =

- Born: 18 September 1911; Donostia-San Sebastián, Basque Country; Spain
- Died: 23 October 1961 (aged 50); Donostia-San Sebastián, Basque Country; Spain
- Other name: Ceferino Cancio Amunárriz
- Occupation: Actor
- Years active: 1933-1961 (film)

Raúl Cancio (18 September 1911 – 23 October 1961) was a Spanish film actor, screenwriter and film director. Cancio acted in more than sixty five films including Raza (1942). He also directed two films, a 1952 documentary and a 1950 feature film.

== Selected filmography ==
=== Actor ===
- Raza (1942)
- Blood in the Snow (1942)
- House of Cards (1943)
- Public Trial (1946)
- The Emigrant (1946)
- Peace (1949)
- The Troublemaker (1950)
- Tales of the Alhambra (1950)
- Agustina of Aragon (1950)
- Black Sky (1951)
- The Girl at the Inn (1951)
- The Seventh Page (1951)
- The Great Galeoto (1951)
- The Floor Burns (1952)
- Estrella of the Sierra Morena (1952)
- Flight 971 (1953)
- The Cheerful Caravan (1953)
- Adventures of the Barber of Seville (1954)
- Fedra (1956)
- Let's Make the Impossible! (1958)
- College Boarding House (1959)
- They Fired with Their Lives (1959)
- The Football Lottery (1960)

=== Screenwriter ===
- Follow the Legion (1942)

== Bibliography ==
- Pavlović, Tatjana. 100 Years of Spanish Cinema. John Wiley & Sons, 2009.
