= Gaby Peñalba =

Spanish film editor

- Born: Gabriela Peñalba
- Occupation: Film editor

Gaby Peñalba (also known as Gaby Peñalva Elzo) was a prolific Spanish film editor active from the 1940s through the 1980s.

== Selected filmography ==
- La llamada del sexo (1977)
- Fuzzy the Hero (1973)
- Kill Django... Kill First (1971)
- White Comanche (1969)
- The Glass Sphinx (1967)
- Danger!! Death Ray (1967)
- The Big Gundown (1966)
- Curra Veleta (1956)
- Malvaloca (1954)
- Love on Wheels (1954)
- Nobody Will Know (1953)
- La alegre caravana (1953)
- ¡Che, qué loco! (1953)
- Violetas imperiales (1952)
- Feather in the Wind (1952)
- Estrella of the Sierra Morena (1952)
- La niña de la venta (1951)
- La trinca del aire (1951)
- El último caballo (1950)
- La dama del armiño (1947)
- The Emigrant (1946)
