= Ramón Torrado =

Spanish film director

- Born: 5 April 1905; A Coruña, Galicia, Spain
- Died: January 1990; Madrid
- Occupations: Film director, screenwriter
- Years active: 1939–1978

Ramón Torrado (5 April 1905 – January 1990) was a Spanish film director and screenwriter. He directed 50 films between 1942 and 1978.

Along his brother Adolfo Torrado, they worked in Suevia Films, and he directed Botón de ancla (1948), with a good success and was adapted many times, El famoso Carballeira, Polizón a bordo (1941), Mar abierto (1946) and Sabela de Cambados (1948).

He met dancer Lola Flores and she appeared in Estrella de Sierra Morena (1952), and María de la O (1959), which was adapted from the 1936 version by Francisco Elías Riquelme and Carmen Amaya, Julio Peña, Antonio Moreno and Pastora Imperio were the main characters. He directed Mi canción es para ti (1965), starring Manolo Escobar, Ángel de Andrés, María Martín, Alejandra Nilo, María Isbert and Rafaela Aparicio. He directed others musical films with Manolo Escobar such as Un beso en el puerto, (1966) and El padre Manolo (1967).

He directed Spaghetti Western films such as Cavalry Charge (1964).

== Selected filmography ==
- The Wheel of Life (1942)
- Castanet (1945)
- The Emigrant (1946)
- Rumbo (1949)
- La Virgen gitana (1951)
- The Girl at the Inn (1951)
- La trinca del aire (1951)
- Estrella of the Sierra Morena (1952)
- Feather in the Wind (1952)
- The Cheerful Caravan (1953)
- Malvaloca (1954)
- Love on Wheels (1954)
- Sighs of Triana (1955)
- Curra Veleta (1956)
- One Step Forward (1960)
- En un mundo nuevo (1972)
