= Pedro Lazaga =

Spanish film director

- Born: Pedro Lazaga Sabater; 3 October 1918; Valls (Tarragona), Spain
- Died: 30 November 1979 (aged 61); Madrid, Spain
- Occupations: Film director Screenwriter
- Years active: 1948-1979

Pedro Lazaga Sabater (3 October 1918 – 30 November 1979) was a Spanish film director and screenwriter. He directed more than 90 films between 1948 and 1979.

== Selected filmography ==
- The Black Siren (1947)
- María Morena (1951)
- Fog and Sun (1951)
- Three Ladies (1960)
- Gladiators 7 (1962)
- Dos chicas locas, locas (1964)
- Sor Citroën (1967)
- Cabaret Woman (1974)
- Naked Therapy (1975)
- Ambitious (1976)
