= Manuel Arbó =

Spanish actor

- Born: 18 July 1898; Madrid, Spain
- Died: 25 May 1973 (aged 74); Madrid, Spain
- Occupation: Actor
- Years active: 1915-1970

Manuel Arbó (18 July 1898 – 25 May 1973) was a Spanish film actor. He appeared in more than 200 films between 1915 and 1970.

== Selected filmography ==
- Drácula (1931, Spanish version)
- There Were Thirteen (1931, Spanish-language version of Charlie Chan Carries On)
- Juan Simón's Daughter (1935)
- The Man Who Wanted to Kill Himself (1942)
- A Palace for Sale (1942)
- Journey to Nowhere (1942)
- Follow the Legion (1942)
- Idols (1943)
- It Happened in Damascus (1943)
- Bamboo (1945)
- Unknown Path (1946)
- The Prodigal Woman (1946)
- The Party Goes On (1948)
- Guest of Darkness (1948)
- The Butterfly That Flew Over the Sea (1948)
- Rumbo (1949)
- The Guitar of Gardel (1949)
- Jalisco Sings in Seville (1949)
- The Captain from Loyola (1949)
- They Always Return at Dawn (1949)
- El último caballo (1950)
- Apollo Theatre (1950)
- The Troublemaker (1950)
- Agustina of Aragon (1950)
- Tales of the Alhambra (1950)
- Tormented Soul (1950)
- The Lioness of Castille (1951)
- Captain Poison (1951)
- The Great Galeoto (1951)
- A Tale of Two Villages (1951)
- The Seventh Page (1951)
- A Room for Three (1952)
- Airport (1953)
- The Fisher of Songs (1954)
- An Impossible Crime (1954)
- Good News (1954)
- Three are Three (1955)
- Afternoon of the Bulls (1956)
- Curra Veleta (1956)
- Sonatas (1959)
- Where Are You Going, Alfonso XII? (1959)
- College Boarding House (1959)
- Litri and His Shadow (1960)
- Carnival Day (1960)
- The Little Colonel (1960)
- At Five O'Clock in the Afternoon (1961)
- A Nearly Decent Girl (1963)
- The Troublemaker (1963)
- Bullets Don't Argue (1964)
- Aragonese Nobility (1965)
- With the East Wind (1966)
