= List of Spanish films of 1950 =

A list of films produced in Spain in 1950 (see 1950 in film).

== 1950 ==
Title	Director	Cast	Genre	Notes
1950
Agustina of Aragon	Juan de Orduña	Aurora Bautista, Fernando Rey	Historical	About Agustina de Aragón
Andalousie	Robert Vernay	Luis Mariano, Maurice Baquet		French/Spanish co-production
Apartado de correos 1001	Julio Salvador	Manuel de Juan, Conrado San Martín	Film Noir	Spanish Neorealism
Apollo Theatre	Rafael Gil	Jorge Negrete, Juan Espantaleón	Musical	
Criminal Brigade	Ignacio F. Iquino	José Suárez, Barta Barri	Film Noir	Spanish Neorealism
Child of the Night	Ricardo Gascón	Osvaldo Genazzani, María Rosa Salgado	Drama	
Don Juan	José Luis Sáenz de Heredia	António Vilar, Annabella, María Rosa Salgado	Adventure	
The Honesty of the Lock	Luis Escobar	Francisco Rabal, Modesto Cid	Drama	Entered into the 1951 Cannes Film Festival
The Last Horse	Edgar Neville	Conchita Montes, Fernando Fernán Gómez	Comedy	Spanish Neorealism
Saturday Night	Rafael Gil	María Félix, Rafael Durán	Drama	
A Thief Has Arrived	Ricardo Gascón	Roberto Font, Margarete Genske	Drama	
Thirty Nine Love Letters	Francisco Rovira Beleta	Irasema Dilián, Ángel Picazo, Tony Leblanc	Comedy	
Tormented Soul	Juan de Orduña	Miriam Di San Servolo, José Bódalo, Eduardo Fajardo	Drama	
The Vila Family	Ignacio F. Iquino	José Isbert, Juan de Landa	Comedy	
Woman to Woman	Luis Lucia	Amparo Rivelles, Ana Mariscal, Eduardo Fajardo	Drama	
