= List of Spanish films of 1954 =

A list of films produced in Spain in 1954 (see 1954 in film).

== 1954 ==
Title	Director	Cast	Genre	Notes
1954
Adventures of the Barber of Seville	Ladislao Vajda	Luis Mariano, Lolita Sevilla	Comedy	Co-production with France; Entered into the 1954 Cannes Film Festival
All Is Possible in Granada	José Luis Sáenz de Heredia	Merle Oberon, Francisco Rabal	Comedy	Entered into the 1954 Cannes Film Festival
An Andalusian Gentleman	Luis Lucia	Jorge Mistral, Carmen Sevilla	Musical	
Boyfriend in Sight	Luis García Berlanga	José María Rodero, José Luis López Vázquez	Comedy	
Comedians	Juan Antonio Bardem	Emma Penella, Fernando Rey, Elisa Galvé, Rosario García Ortega, Mariano Asquerino, Carlos Casaravilla, Manuel Alexandre	Drama	Inspirated by All About Eve, Bardem remade it as musical in 1970, Varietés starring Sara Montiel
Eleven Pairs of Boots	Francisco Rovira Beleta	José Suarez, Elisa Montés	Sports	
He Died Fifteen Years Ago	Rafael Gil	Rafael Rivelles, Francisco Rabal	Drama	José Antonio Giménez-Arnau's anticommunist play
High Fashion	Luis Marquina	Margarita Lozano, María Martín, Lyla Rocco	Drama	
The Island Princess	Paolo Moffa	Silvana Pampanini, Marcello Mastroianni	Comedy	Co-production with Italy
Judas' Kiss	Rafael Gil	Rafael Rivelles, Francisco Rabal	Drama	
Love in a Hot Climate	Georges Rouquier, Ricardo Muñoz Suay			Co-production with France; Entered into the 1954 Cannes Film Festival
Love on Wheels	Ramón Torrado	Carmen Morell, José Isbert, Félix Fernández	Musical	
The Louts	Juan Lladó	Barta Barri, Modesto Cid	Comedy	
The Mayor of Zalamea	José Gutiérrez Maesso	Alfredo Mayo, Isabel de Pomés	Historical	
Morena Clara	Luis Lucia	Lola Flores, Miguel Ligero	Musical	
One Bullet Is Enough	Juan Lladó	Georges Ulmer, Véra Norman	Crime	Co-production with France
