= That Luzmela Girl =

That Luzmela Girl (Spanish:La niña de Luzmela) may refer to:

- That Luzmela Girl (novel), a 1909 novel by the Spanish writer Concha Espina
- That Luzmela Girl (film), a 1949 film directed by Ricardo Gascón
