= A Thief Has Arrived =

A Thief Has Arrived may refer to:

- A Thief Has Arrived (1940 film), a 1940 Argentine film
- A Thief Has Arrived (1950 film), a 1950 Spanish film
