= Pragda =

Pragda is an independent cultural initiative, Spanish cinema promoters and film distribution company.

== History ==
In 2003, Pragda founded ShortMetraje, a Spanish short film series hosted by The Film Society of Lincoln Center. In 2005 the series travelled to 15 US cities, London (Spanish Film Club) and México DF (Espacio Cine). Pragda also brought the first Spanish documentary series to New York City, Docuspain, in 2006.

In 2007, it organized 13 film events, among them, Spain (Un)Censored, hosted by MoMA in New York and BFI Southbank in London. In 2008, the number of events increased to 23, and it was the first edition of the Festival of New Spanish Cinema, a traveling annual Spanish Film Festival. It has collaborated with cultural institutions such as MoMA (New York), Harvard Film Archives (Boston), the Film Society of Lincoln Center (New York), BFI Southbank (London), and Houston Museum of Fine Arts (Houston).

== Projects ==
=== ShortMetraje ===
The Film Society of Lincoln Center (New York), presents, each December since 2003, short films by the youngest generation of Spanish creators. ShortMetraje was an initiative created to support and promote the works of Spanish filmmakers in the US territory.

=== Festival of New Spanish Cinema ===
Traveling festival of contemporary Spanish cinema in several cities throughout North America (U.S., Puerto Rico and Canada), in a yearly basis, since 2008. One director per city presents his/her film and gives a lecture to film students at the local universities.

Some of the films included in the Festival of New Spanish Cinema:

- In Sylvia's City (Jose Luis Guerin)
- Garbo The Spy (Edmond Roch)
- Camino (Javier Fesser)
- Amateurs (Gabriel Velázquez)
- The Damned (Isaki Lacuesta)
- Who can kill a child? (Narciso Ibáñez Serrador)

=== Spain (Un)Censored ===
Retrospective of 20 Spanish films produced between the 1950s and 1970s that circumvent Franco's regime censorship. This film program was screened first in the Museum of Modern Art, New York (17 October – 5 November 2007), and traveled later to BFI Southbank, London, (15 January – 17 February 2008).

The films included among others were:

- Bienvenido Mr. Marshall (Luis G. Berlanga)
- Poachers (Jose Luis Borau)
- Surcos (Jose Antonio Nieves Conde)
- The Hunt (Carlos Saura),
- El Crimen de Cuenca (Pilar Miró),
- El Verdugo (Luis G. Berlanga),
- The Spirit of the Beehive (Víctor Erice)
- Plácido (Luis G. Berlanga)
