= That Luzmela Girl (film) =

1949 film

- Directed by: Ricardo Gascón
- Written by: Concha Espina (novel); Antonio Abad Ojuel; Manuel Bengoa; Antonio Sau Olite; Ricardo Gascón
- Produced by: José Carreras Planas
- Starring: Modesto Cid; Irene Caba Alba
- Cinematography: Enzo Serafin
- Edited by: Juan Palleja
- Music by: Juan Durán Alemany
- Production company: PECSA Films
- Distributed by: PESCA Films
- Release date: 4 November 1949
- Running time: 87 minutes
- Country: Spain
- Language: Spanish

That Luzmela Girl (Spanish:La niña de Luzmela) is a 1949 Spanish drama film directed by Ricardo Gascón and starring Modesto Cid and Irene Caba Alba. It is an adaptation of the 1909 novel of the same title by Concha Espina.

== Cast ==
- Emilia Baró
- Olga Batalla
- Irene Caba Alba
- Modesto Cid
- Alfonso Estela
- Osvaldo Genazzani
- Antonio Martí
- Laly Monty
- María Rosa Salgado
- Fernando Sancho
- Juana Soler
- José Suarez
- Juan Valero
- Juan Velilla

== Bibliography ==
- de España, Rafael. Directory of Spanish and Portuguese film-makers and films. Greenwood Press, 1994.
