= Criminal Brigade =

Criminal Brigade may refer to:

- Criminal Brigade (1947 film), a French film directed by Gilbert Gil
- Criminal Brigade (1950 film), a Spanish film directed by Ignacio F. Iquino
