= Carmencita Aubert =

Spanish singer and actress (1912–1979)

- Aubert in Portugal
- Born: Carme Recasens i Aubert; 6 January 1912; Barcelona, Spain
- Died: 1979; Lisbon, Portugal
- Other names: Carmelita Aubert
- Occupation(s): Variety show actress; tango singer

Carmencita Aubert (1912–1979), born Carme Recasens i Aubert, and also known as Carmelita Aubert, was a Spanish singer and actress. She was a renowned stage performer in Barcelona in the early 1930s but, as a supporter of the Republican side, stayed in Lisbon, Portugal in 1936 when the Spanish Civil War broke out and took up permanent residence in Lisbon from 1944 after having been briefly arrested that year in Madrid.

== Early life ==
Aubert was born in Barcelona on 6 January 1912. She was the daughter of a variety show actress, Rafaela Aubert, who was known as La Guayabita. She registered her daughter in the Cariteu School, one of the many artistic academies in Barcelona at that time, where she was discovered by Alady (Carlos Saldaña), a well-known Catalan actor and comedian. Together with Alady she made her artistic debut in 1931 in Arenys de Mar. In the same year she participated in the Follies 1931 variety show at the Nou Theatre in Barcelona, which was organised by the American dancer, Harry Fleming. In 1932, she formed a duo with the tango singer, Mario Visconti, which made her popular on stage and in recordings. She sang tangos, waltzes, folk songs, jazz, and popular American film songs. As a result of her love of tango she met the composer Gerardo Alcazar, with whom she began a close relationship. She performed in Barcelona's main venues, such as the Granja Royal, the Maison Dorée and the Cine Fantasio.

In 1932 she starred with the comedian Josep Santpere i Pei in the successful film Mercedes, directed by José María Castellví, together with the Argentine singer Héctor Morel. The film blended Catalan nationalism with a love story. Around 1934 she began calling herself Carmelita instead of Carmencita. In 1935, she starred in the film Abajo los hombres (Down with Men), considered the first Spanish musical, which was directed by Valentín Rodríguez González. The radio station Ràdio Associació de Catalunya included her among its artists and she also did radio advertising, notably performing the song by Jaume Mestres i Pérez composed to advertise the perfume Cocaína en Flor. She made several recordings for the Odeon Records label.

Aubert was known for her left-wing views, frequenting the company of Andreu Nin and other members of the Workers' and Peasants' Bloc. A supporter of the anarcho-syndicalist trade union, Confederación Nacional del Trabajo, she had been selected for Down with Men by its writer, Valentín R. González, who was also a supporter. She performed the song Comunista with the Crazy Boys Orchestra. Another of her songs, Clemencia, a tango, experienced censorship problems, as the authorities suspected that its title was calling for an official pardon for those charged in connection with the Asturian Revolution of 1934.

When the Spanish Civil War broke out in 1936, she was in Portugal. She stayed in Lisbon and became a leading star of the musical revues, known as magazine shows in Portugal. On 6 October 1944, she attempted to return to Catalonia to work on an album and a film, but she was immediately arrested in Madrid by the Francoist police. When the news reached Portugal, numerous theatre people and others demonstrated in front of the Spanish embassy, and she was eventually released and returned by train to Portugal, arriving on 26 October to be met by large crowds at the station. She then settled permanently in Portugal, continuing to perform as a leading revue star until the early 1950s, when she married the Portuguese Carlos de Barros Miranda Simão and retired from show business.

== Death ==
Aubert died in Lisbon in 1979.
