= O Leão da Estrela =

1947 film by Arthur Duarte

- Directed by: Arthur Duarte
- Screenplay by: João Bastos; Félix Bermudes; Ernesto Rodrigues
- Based on: O Leão da Estrela; 1925 play by João Bastos; Félix Bermudes; Ernesto Rodrigues
- Produced by: Fernando Fragoso
- Starring: António Silva; Milú; Maria Eugénia; Laura Alves; Tony D'Algy; Fernando Curado Ribeiro; Arthur Agostinho; Maria Olguim; Cremilda de Oliveira; Óscar Acúrcio; Erico Braga
- Cinematography: Aquilino Mendes
- Edited by: António Martins
- Music by: Jaime Mendes
- Production company: Tobis Portuguesa
- Distributed by: Imperial Filmes; Lisboa Filme
- Release dates: November 25, 1947 (Teatro São Luiz, Lisbon)
- Running time: 121 minutes
- Country: Portugal
- Language: Portuguese

O Leão da Estrela (Portuguese language for "The Lion from Estrela") is a Portuguese comedy film of 1947, starring António Silva, Milú, Maria Eugénia, Laura Alves, Tony D'Algy, Fernando Curado Ribeiro, Arthur Agostinho, Maria Olguim, Cremilda de Oliveira, Óscar Acúrcio, and Erico Braga, and directed by Arthur Duarte. It is a classic of the Portuguese cinema. In its remake of 2015, the main character is played by Miguel Guilherme.

== Plot ==
Anastácio's family, from Lisbon, had casually met on vacation the Barata family from Porto, in the spa town of Caldas da Rainha, and one of Anastácio's daughters, who had a crush upon the handsome son of Mr. Barata, lied about her family’s wealth prompting her vacationing family to stand with the lie. Later, a decisive Sporting Clube de Portugal's (the Lions or Leões in Portuguese because of the rampant lion in the sports club crest) away match with Futebol Clube do Porto is about to take place in the city of Porto. When he fails to get a train ticket to travel to Porto in an attempt to watch in loco the football game of his favourite football team from the sidelines, Anastácio, a supporter of Sporting Clube de Portugal employed in a Lisbon office, pretends to be a wealthy individual in order to be able to go to the city of Porto with his family, where they will be hosted by the Barata family for a stay in their house.

== See also ==
- FC Porto–Sporting CP rivalry
