= What Madness! =

1953 film

- Directed by: Ramón Torrado
- Written by: Ramón Torrado; Víctor López Iglesias; Francisco Ramos de Castro; Mariano Ozores; Antonio Ozores
- Produced by: Benito Perojo
- Starring: Pepe Iglesias; Emma Penella; Silvia Morgan
- Cinematography: Alfredo Fraile
- Edited by: Gaby Peñalba
- Music by: Juan Quintero
- Production company: Suevia Films
- Distributed by: Suevia Films
- Release date: 23 March 1953
- Running time: 85 minutes
- Country: Spain
- Language: Spanish

What Madness! (Spanish: ¡Che, qué loco!) is a 1953 Spanish comedy film directed by Ramón Torrado and starring Pepe Iglesias, Emma Penella and Silvia Morgan. The film's sets were designed by the art director Sigfrido Burmann.

== Plot ==
A ruined Pepe Valdés (Pepe Iglesias) tries to marry the millionaire Esperancita (Emma Penella), which triggers a series of misunderstandings.

== Cast ==
- Pepe Iglesias as Pepe Valdés
- Emma Penella as Esperancita Couceiro
- Silvia Morgan as Esther
- José Isbert as Don Ramiro
- Fernando Fernández de Córdoba as Rosendo
- Julia Lajos as Esperanza
- Carlos Fioriti as Mangatutto
- Modesto Cid as Andrés
- Arturo Marín as Presidente del Tribunal de conciencia
- Rosario Royo as Josefa
- Matilde Artero as Clotilde
- Dora Sancho as Rosario
- Blanca Suárez as Turista
- Manuel Guitián as Amancio
- Joaquín Pujol as Camarero
- Fernando Carmona as Médico
- Beni Deus as Alemán
- Manrique Gil as Invitado
- Vicente Gómez Bur as Aníbal

== Bibliography ==
- Paco Ignacio Taibo. Un cine para un imperio: historia de las películas franquistas. CONACULTA, 2000.
