= Plot on the Stage =

1953 film

- Directed by: Feliciano Catalán
- Written by: Feliciano Catalán; H.S. Valdés
- Cinematography: Juan Mariné
- Edited by: Margarita de Ochoa
- Music by: Fernando Gravina y Castelli; Manuel L. Quiroga; Modesto Rebollo
- Production company: Cinematográfica Madrileña
- Distributed by: Peninsular Films
- Release date: 19 October 1953
- Running time: 80 minutes
- Country: Spain
- Language: Spanish

Plot on the Stage (Spanish:Intriga en el escenario) is a 1953 Spanish crime film directed by Feliciano Catalán.

== Cast ==
- Gabriel Alcover as Policía 2º
- Florinda Chico
- Helena Cortesina as Olga
- Elva de Bethancourt as Doncella de servicio
- Victoria del Castillo
- Encarna Fuentes as Mary
- Margarete Genske as Tina Reyes
- José Gomís as Daniel
- Enrique Guitart as Olmedo
- Manuel Guitián as Trombonista
- Casimiro Hurtado as Gitano
- José Isbert as Portero
- Víctor M. Morales as Children
- Manolo Morán as Paco
- Joaquín Palomares
- Gustavo Re as Óscar
- Carmen Rey
- Rosario Royo as Señora del empresario
- Fernando Sancho as Policía 1º
- José Toledano
- Juan Vázquez as Empresario

== Bibliography ==
- Bentley, Bernard. A Companion to Spanish Cinema. Boydell & Brewer 2008.
