= Georges Ulmer =

Danish-born French composer and actor

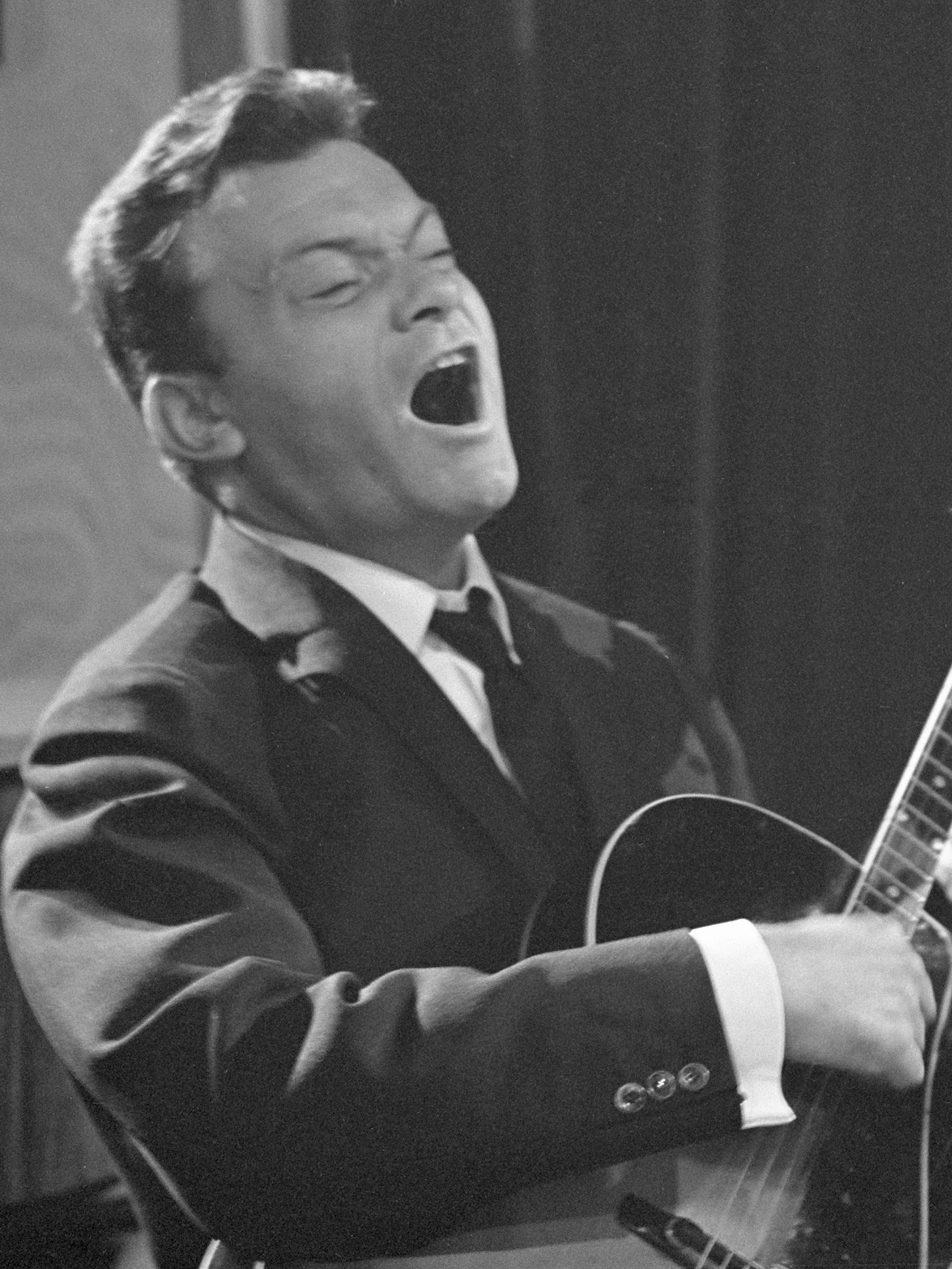
Georges Ulmer (1962)

Georges Ulmer (1919–1989) was a Danish-born composer, librettist, and actor who became a naturalized French citizen. He was born Jørgen Frederik Ulmer on 16 February 1919 in Copenhagen, Denmark, and died on 29 September 1989 at Marseille, Bouches-du-Rhône, France. He was the father of singer Laura Ulmer.

== Biography ==
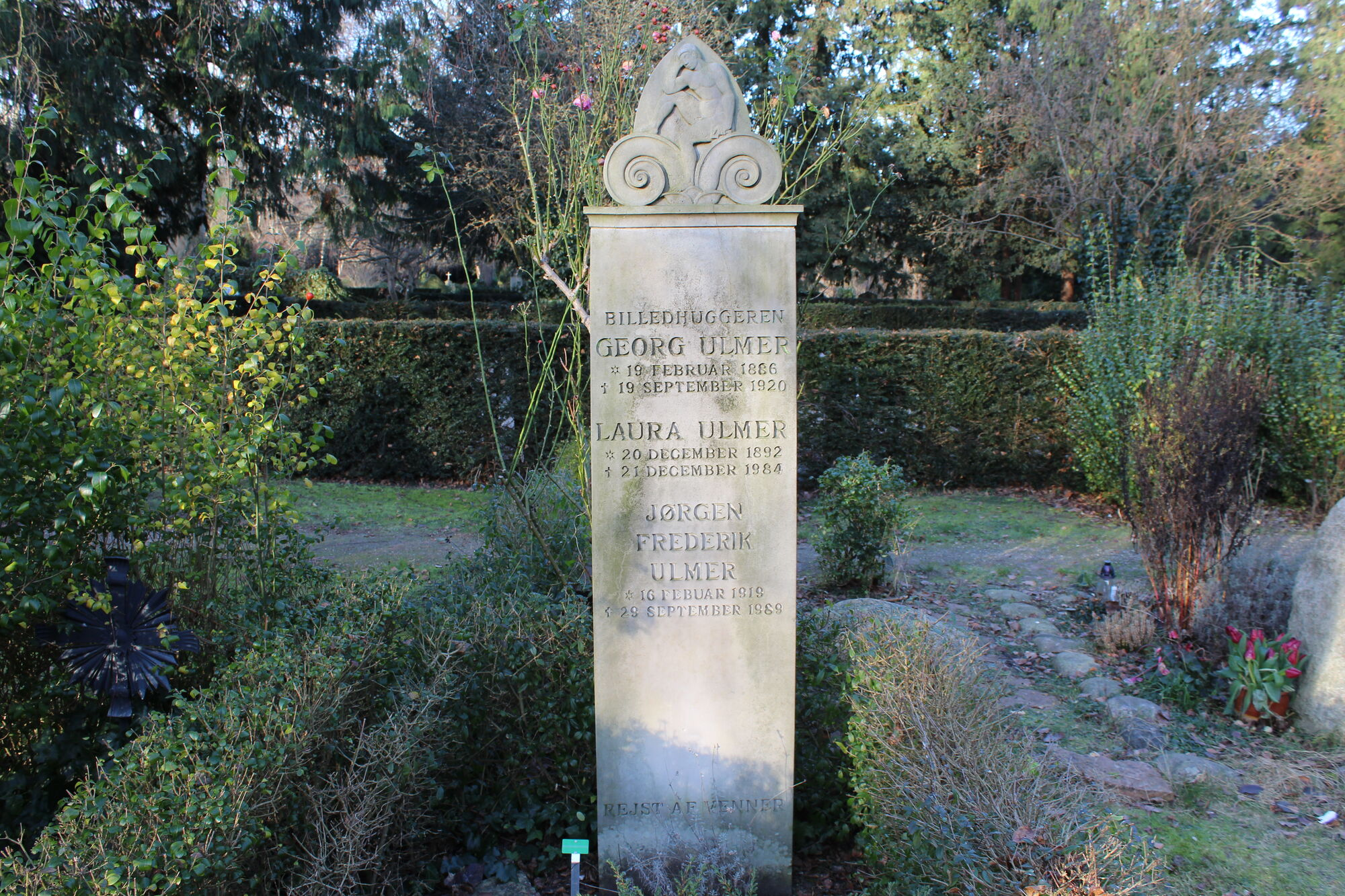
Ulmer's tombstone in Copenhagen's Assistens Cemetery.

Ulmer grew up in Spain, where he started work as a musical performer, writer, and composer for the movies. However, it was in France that he quickly found a permanent place in the musical firmament with his immortal cliché of Parisian tourism, Pigalle, which he co-wrote in 1944 with the lyricist, Géo Koger, and composed with Guy Luypaerts. Other than his own interpretation, the song was also covered by Jean Sablon, Charles Dumont, Franck Pourcel, Paul Anka, Bing Crosby, Petula Clark, Silvio Berlusconi, and many others.

== Filmography ==
- 1950 – El ciclón del Caribe, directed by Ramón Pereda: Wrote the score.
- 1950 – La Vida en broma, directed by Jaime Salvador: Acted and wrote the score.
- 1951 – Paris Still Sings, directed by Pierre Montazel: Played himself
- 1952 – Mujeres sacrificadas (El recuerdo del otro), directed by Alberto Gout: Wrote the score.
- 1953 – La Route du bonheur, directed by Maurice Labro and Giorgio Simonelli: Played himself
- 1954 – One Bullet Is Enough, directed by Jean Sacha and Juan Lladó: Carmo et auteur des chansons
- 1955 – Flickan i regnet, directed by Alf Kjellin: The song, Pigalle.
- 1957 – C'est arrivé à 36 chandelles, directed by Henri Diamant-Berger: Played himself.
- 1958 – Música en la noche, directed by Tito Davison: Acted and wrote the score.
- 1960 – À pleines mains, directed by Maurice Regamey
- 1963 – Canzoni nel mondo (38–24–36), directed by Vittorio Sala
