= Enzo Serafin =

Italian cinematographer

- Born: 16 April 1912; Venice, Italy
- Died: 27 December 1995 (aged 83); Rome, Italy
- Occupation: Cinematographer

Enzo Serafin (16 April 1912, Venice – 27 December 1995, Rome) was an Italian cinematographer.

== Biography ==
Serafin cooperated with Michelangelo Antonioni (Cronaca di un amore (1950), La signora senza camelie (1953), I vinti (1953)), Roberto Rossellini (Viaggio in Italia (1954)), Ricardo Gascón, Ignacio F. Iquino, Luigi Zampa, Gianni Franciolini, Alfredo Guarini and others. He was a cinematographer of several parts of Les Sept péchés capitaux (1962) and Siamo donne (1953). In 1953, Enzo Serafin won Silver Ribbon for his works.

== Selected filmography ==
- Forbidden Music (1942)
- Gentleman Thief (1946)
- When the Angels Sleep (1947)
- Unexpected Conflict (1948)
- That Luzmela Girl (1949)
- Child of the Night (1950)
- A Thief Has Arrived (1950)
- The Temptress (1952)
- Husband and Wife (1952)
- Journey to Italy (1954)
- Condemned to Sin (1964)
