= Younger Brother (film) =

- Directed by: Domingo Viladomat
- Written by: José Rodulfo Boeta
- Produced by: R. Rodulfo
- Starring: Gustavo Rojo; María Rivas; Enrique Guitart
- Cinematography: Francisco Sempere
- Edited by: José Antonio Rojo
- Music by: José Pagán; Antonio Ramírez Ángel
- Production company: Itálica Films
- Distributed by: Itálica Films
- Release date: 23 February 1953
- Running time: 85 minutes
- Country: Spain
- Language: Spanish

Younger Brother (Spanish: Hermano menor) is a 1953 Spanish drama film directed by Domingo Viladomat and starring Gustavo Rojo, María Rivas and Enrique Guitart.

== Synopsis ==
Two boys are orphaned by their father, who has committed suicide in the suburbs of a big city. The older brother will make an effort so that his younger sister can study.

== Cast ==
In alphabetical order

- Mercedes Albert
- María Asquerino
- Mariano Azaña
- Eduardo Calvo
- Félix de Pomés
- Julia Delgado Caro
- Enrique Guitart
- Manuel Guitart
- Gabriel Llopart
- Margarita Lozano
- Manolo Morán
- Eloísa Muro
- Gustavo Re
- María Rivas
- Santiago Rivero
- Gustavo Rojo
- Carmen Seco
- Alain Soumet as child
- Ángel Terrón
- Lily Vicenti

== Bibliography ==
- Juan Francisco Cerón Gómez. Cien años de cine en Lorca. EDITUM, 1999.
