= The Cliff of Sin =

1950 film

- Directed by: Roberto Bianchi Montero
- Written by: Enzo Avitabile; Roberto Bianchi Montero; Mario Galatrona; Fulvio Palmieri
- Starring: Gino Cervi; Margarete Genske; Delia Scala
- Cinematography: Carlo Nebiolo
- Edited by: Guido Bertoli
- Music by: Alberto De Castello
- Production company: International Urania Film
- Distributed by: Regionale; Minerva Film
- Release date: 1950
- Running time: 94 minutes
- Country: Italy
- Language: Italian

The Cliff of Sin (Italian: La scogliera del peccato) is a 1950 Italian melodrama film directed by Roberto Bianchi Montero and starring Gino Cervi, Margarete Genske and Delia Scala.

The film's sets were designed by the art director Alfredo Montori. It was initially distributed by regional independents before being given a second release by Minerva Film in 1951.

== Plot ==
Ischia. Stella, a fatal woman, joins Silvano, her old lover, who has been living isolated and alcoholic for some time in a hut on the island. To achieve her purpose, to seize her possessions, she does not hesitate to poison him. Immediately after she seduces Paolo, a young fisherman, and involves him in the trafficking of a gang of smugglers, so much so that he gives up on marrying Anna, she promises to him. Michele, the girl's brother, returns to the island just to make Paolo retrace her steps but he too yields to Stella's charm, becoming her lover and her accomplice in six trafficking of her. However, he is arrested and sentenced. Having served his sentence, he discovers the woman with Paolo and the two begin to fight. It just so happens that she is the woman who falls into the sea and dies. The two men, free from temptation, can resume their friendship.

== Cast ==
- Gino Cervi as Silvano
- Margarete Genske as Stella
- Delia Scala as Anna
- Otello Toso as Michele
- Ermanno Randi as Paolo
- Olga Solbelli as Maria
- Amedeo Trilli
- Gustavo Serena
- Virginia Balestrieri
- Leopoldo Valentini as Giovanni
