= Reckless (1951 film) =

1951 film

- Directed by: José Antonio Nieves Conde
- Written by: Vicente Escrivá
- Starring: Manolo Morán
- Cinematography: José F. Aguayo; Manuel Berenguer
- Edited by: Juan Serra
- Music by: Jesús García Leoz
- Release date: 5 February 1951
- Running time: 90 minutes
- Country: Spain
- Language: Spanish

Reckless (Spanish: Balarrasa) is a 1951 Spanish drama film directed by José Antonio Nieves Conde. It was entered into the 1951 Cannes Film Festival.

== Plot ==
Spanish missionary Javier Mendoza (Fernando Fernán Gómez) finds himself trapped in the middle of a massive snowstorm in Alaska. Fearing that the end of his days has come, he begins to remember his life: After the death of his mother, his father (Javier Tordesillas) dedicates himself to gambling and Javier himself, known as Balarrasa, also leads a rampant life. Nor do the other siblings, Fernando (Luis Prendes), Lina (Dina Stern) and Maite (María Rosa Salgado) lead exemplary lives. When the Spanish Civil War breaks out, Mendoza engages in unheroic behavior that ends the life of a colleague when he plays cards instead of pulling a guard duty shift that was assigned to him. Affected by the event, he enters the seminary. After redirecting the existence of his relatives, he begins a new life as a missionary.

== Cast ==
- Manolo Morán as Desiderio
- Jesús Tordesillas as Carlos
- Dina Sten as Lina
- Luis Prendes as Fernando
- José Bódalo as Presidente del club
- Maruchi Fresno as Elena
- María Rosa Salgado as Mayte
- Eduardo Fajardo as Mario
- Fernando Fernán Gómez as Javier Mendoza 'Balarrasa'
- Fernando Aguirre as Valentin
- Francisco Bernal as Emiliano
- Mario Berriatúa as Teniente Hernández
- Julia Caba Alba as Faustina
- Chano Conde as Teniente
- Alfonso de Córdoba as Alférez
- Gérard Tichy as Zanders
