= Facing the Sea =

- Directed by: Carlos Serrano de Osma
- Written by: Julio Coll; Antonio Ferrer; José Antonio Pérez Torreblanca
- Produced by: Antonio Bofarull
- Cinematography: Sebastián Perera; Salvador Torres Garriga
- Edited by: Antonio Cánovas; Ángeles Pruña
- Music by: Rafael Ferrer-Fitó
- Production company: Titán Films
- Release date: 29 November 1951
- Running time: 83 minutes
- Country: Spain
- Language: Spanish

Facing the Sea (Spanish:Rostro al mar) is a 1951 Spanish drama film directed by Carlos Serrano de Osma. It deals with the return of exiles from the Spanish Civil War era.

== Synopsis ==
After the Spanish Civil War, Alberto and Isabel decide to flee to France to avoid reprisals. She is pregnant and on the way, she goes into labor, so they decide to stop before they reach the border. Alberto decides to leave so as not to endanger his family, promising Isabel to meet again as soon as possible.

== Cast ==
- Antonio Bofarull as Manuel
- José Bruguera as Vicente
- Fortunato García as Andrés
- Montserrat Garcia as Martita
- Camino Garrigó as Doña marta
- José Gayán as Frankie
- Francisco Melgares as Marcos
- Eulalia Montero as Isabel
- José Manuel Pinillos as Ferruchi
- Antonio Piñeiro as Oficial
- José Luis Quintana as Ginés
- Illa Serti as María
- Juan Manuel Soriano as Ramón
- Carlo Tamberlani as Alberto
- Guillermo Urtazun
- Lily Vincenti as Catherine

== Bibliography ==
- Bentley, Bernard. A Companion to Spanish Cinema. Boydell & Brewer 2008.
