= Eugenio Testa =

Italian actor and film director

- Born: Eugenio Valentino Mario Ernesto Testa; 6 October 1892; Turin, Piedmont; Italy
- Died: 11 October 1957 (aged 65); Turin, Piedmont; Italy
- Occupations: Director; Actor
- Years active: 1913–1957
- Parent: Dante Testa (father)

Eugenio Testa (6 October 1892 – 11 October 1957) was an Italian actor and film director. He directed and starred in The Monster of Frankenstein (1920), one of the earliest Italian horror films. He was the son of the stage actor Dante Testa.

== Selected filmography ==
=== Director ===
- Il mostro di Frankenstein (1920)

=== Actor ===
- Il mostro di Frankenstein (1920)
- The Drummer of Bruch (1948)
- His Heart Awake (1949)
- Apartado de correos 1001 (1950)
- The Vila Family (1950)
- My Beloved Juan (1950)
- Doubt (1951)
- Closed Exit (1955)
- Kubala (1955)

== Sources ==
- Bayman, Louis. Directory of World Cinema: Italy. Intellect Books, 2011.
