= Romeo and Juliet (1940 film) =

- Directed by: José María Castellví
- Written by: José María Pemán; Luis León; José María Castellví
- Based on: Romeo and Juliet; 1597 play by William Shakespeare
- Starring: Martha Flores; Enrique Guitart
- Cinematography: Francesco Izzarelli
- Music by: Ramón Ferrés; Pascual Godes
- Production company: Cinedía
- Release date: 6 December 1940
- Running time: 91 minutes
- Country: Spain
- Language: Spanish

Romeo and Juliet (Spanish:Julieta y Romeo) is a 1940 Spanish historical drama film directed by José María Castellví and starring Martha Flores and Enrique Guitart. The film is an adaptation of William Shakespeare's Romeo and Juliet.

== Plot summary ==
Two teenagers fall in love, but their feuding families and fate itself cause the relationship to end in tragedy.

== Cast ==
- Juan Barajas
- Arturo Cámara
- Marta Flores
- Marta Grau
- Enrique Guitart
- Francisco Hernández
- María Teresa Idel
- Teresa Idel
- Candelaria Medina

== Bibliography ==
- Davies, Anthony & Wells, Stanley. Shakespeare and the Moving Image: The Plays on Film and Television. Cambridge University Press, 1994.
