= El Diablo también llora =

- Directed by: José Antonio Nieves Conde
- Written by: Severiano Fernández Nicolás; Mario Lacruz; José Antonio Nieves Conde; Giorgio Prosperi
- Starring: Eleonora Rossi Drago
- Cinematography: Antonio Macasoli
- Music by: Riz Ortolani
- Release date: 1965
- Countries: Spain; Italy
- Language: Spanish

El Diablo también llora (Italian: Il delitto di Anna Sandoval) (transl. The Devil Also Cries) is a 1965 Spanish-Italian drama film directed by José Antonio Nieves Conde.

== Synopsis ==
Ana Sandoval discovers that her husband Ramón has a lover and a secret child. Driven by jealousy, she murders him. During the trial, the prosecutor is the deceased's brother, while her defender, Tomás, attempts to prove her innocence.

== Cast ==
- Eleonora Rossi Drago as Ana Sandoval
- Francisco Rabal as Tomás
- Alberto Closas as Fernando Quiroga
- Fernando Rey as Ramòn Quiroga
- Paola Barbara as Ana's mother
- Graziella Galvani as Marìa

== Reception ==
One review for El País was negative, calling it "an overburdened police melodrama". Another review for El País said that the film "showed its ability to create unpleasant atmospheres" and called Rossi Drago's interpretation "overwhelming".
