= When the Angels Sleep =

1947 film

- Directed by: Ricardo Gascón
- Written by: Hans Beyeler (novel); Ricardo Gascón
- Starring: Amedeo Nazzari; Clara Calamai; Maria Eugénia; Silvia Morgan
- Cinematography: Enzo Serafin
- Edited by: Juan Palleja
- Music by: Juan Durán Alemany
- Production companies: CISI; PECSA Films
- Distributed by: PESCA Films (Spain)
- Release date: 28 April 1947
- Running time: 105 minutes
- Countries: Italy; Spain
- Language: Spanish

When the Angels Sleep (Spanish: Cuando los ángeles duermen) is a 1947 Spanish-Italian drama film directed by Ricardo Gascón and starring Amedeo Nazzari, Clara Calamai and Maria Eugénia. In Italian the film's title is Quando gli angeli dormono.

== Cast ==
- Amedeo Nazzari as Blin
- Clara Calamai as Elena
- Maria Eugénia as Bianca
- Silvia Morgan as Susana
- Ana Farra as Paulina
- Mona Tarridas
- Gina Montes as Bárbara
- Camino Garrigó as Braulia
- Pedro Mascaró as Oriol
- Alfonso Estela as Lalio
- Modesto Cid as Bonifacio
- Carlos Agostí as Emilio
- Arturo Cámara as Carmona
- Rafael Luis Calvo as Ventura
- Fernando Sancho as Peral
- Jorge Morales as Víctor
- César Pombo as Hurtado
- Luis Villasiul as Cura Riévana
- Enriqueta Villasiul as Dora
- Félix Dafauce as Chas
- Alberto Vialis

== Bibliography ==
- de España, Rafael. Directory of Spanish and Portuguese film-makers and films. Greenwood Press, 1994.
- Lancia, Enrico. Amedeo Nazzari. Gremese Editore, 1983.
