= Charlotte Witthauer =

German film actress

- Born: 18 July 1915; Breslau, Silesia, German Empire
- Died: 6 May 1980 (aged 64); Tutzing, Bavaria, West Germany
- Occupation: Actress
- Years active: 1931-1979 (film)

Charlotte Witthauer (1915–1980) was a German film actress.

== Filmography ==
| Year | Title | Role | Notes |
|---|---|---|---|
| 1931 | Mädchen in Uniform | Ilse von Treischke | Uncredited |
| 1938 | You and I | Minna | |
| 1938 | All Lies | Fräulein Müller | |
| 1939 | Die Geliebte | Guste | |
| 1940 | Die gute Sieben | Fräulein Nickel, Sekretärin bei Marwitz | |
| 1941 | Pedro Will Hang | Alice Baker | |
| 1943 | Melody of a Great City | Eine Telefonistin im Flughafenhotel | |
| 1944 | Love Letters | Barbara Leffert | |
| 1944 | A Wife for Three Days | Lotte Feldhammer | |
| 1949 | Schuld allein ist der Wein | Dora - Magd bei Menges | |
| 1949 | I'll Never Forget That Night | Josefa Bauer | |
| 1950 | Love on Ice | Charlotte Pappke | |
| 1953 | Must We Get Divorced? | Frl. Müller | |
| 1954 | Fireworks | Tante Alwine | |
| 1955 | The Last Man | Tante Elsbeth | |
| 1957 | The Girl Without Pyjamas | Fräulein Rübsahm | |
| 1961 | What Is Father Doing in Italy? | Frau Moll | |
| 1968 | Liebe und so weiter | Frau Schmuck | |
| 1971 | Morgen fällt die Schule aus | Frau Taft | |
| 1972 | Betragen ungenügend! | Frau Taft | |
| 1979 | 1+1=3 [de] | Jurgen's Mother | |

== Bibliography ==
- Noack, Frank. Veit Harlan: The Life and Work of a Nazi Filmmaker. University Press of Kentucky, 2016.
