= Silvia Morgan =

Spanish actress

- Born: 2 October 1923; Barcelona, Spain
- Died: 2 November 2009 (aged 86); Tucson, Arizona
- Other name: Maria dels Àngels Comas i Borràs
- Occupation: Actress
- Years active: 1944-1962 (film)

Silvia Morgan (1923–2009) was a Spanish film actress.

== Selected filmography ==
- Gentleman Thief (1946)
- When the Angels Sleep (1947)
- Under the Skies of the Asturias (1951)
- Forbidden Trade (1952)
- Persecution in Madrid (1952)
- Bella the Savage (1953)
- What Madness! (1953)
- An Impossible Crime (1954)
- An American in Toledo (1960)
- Mission in Morocco (1960)
- The Two Rivals (1960)

== Bibliography ==
- Moore, Robin. Nationalizing Blackness: Afrocubanismo and Artistic Revolution in Havana, 1920-1940. University of Pittsburgh Press, 2015.
