= The Magistrate (1959 film) =

- Directed by: Luigi Zampa
- Written by: Pasquale Festa Campanile; Massimo Franciosa; Luigi Zampa
- Starring: José Suárez
- Cinematography: Manuel Merino; Gábor Pogány
- Edited by: Mario Serandrei
- Music by: Renzo Rossellini
- Release date: 1959 (Italy)
- Running time: 100 Min
- Countries: Italy; Spain
- Language: Italian

The Magistrate (Italian: Il magistrato) is a 1959 Italian-language drama film directed by Luigi Zampa. It was a co-production with Spain and France. Spaniard José Suárez stars in the film, which was shot in Madrid (exterior locations Plaza de España, Plaza Mayor, Parque del Oeste), with a French, Italian and Spanish cast. The name of the Italian city where the action takes place is never mentioned.

It is one of a handful of mid-20th century films that focused on a "judge and his work" (emphasis supplied). One review of Italian films called it "sometimes tending towards demagogy".

A 21-year-old Claudia Cardinale played the role of Orlando's wife in the film.

The film was "moderately successful".

== Cast ==
- José Suárez: Andrea Morandi
- François Périer: Luigi Bonelli
- Jacqueline Sassard: Carla Bonelli
- Massimo Serato: Ugo
- Luis Seigner: Procuratore
- Maurizio Arena: Orlando Di Giovanni
- Claudia Cardinale: Maria
- Ignazio Balsamo: Capitano di nave
- Geronimo Meynier: Pierino Lucchi
