= Camino Garrigó =

Spanish actress

- Born: Pamplona, Navarra; Spain
- Died: 2 January 1954; Barcelona, Catalonia; Spain
- Occupation: Actress
- Years active: 1939-1954 (film)

Camino Garrigó was a Spanish film actress. She appeared in 28 films, generally in supporting roles such as While Angels Sleep (1947).

== Selected filmography ==
- The Complete Idiot (1939)
- Whirlwind (1941)
- Journey to Nowhere (1942)
- Traces of Light (1943)
- House of Cards (1943)
- The Phantom and Dona Juanita (1945)
- While Angels Sleep (1947)
- The Faith (1947)
- Confidences (1948)
- Nobody's Wife (1950)
- Our Lady of Fatima (1951)
- Facing the Sea (1951)
- The Song of Sister Maria (1952)

== Bibliography ==
- Lancia, Enrico. Amedeo Nazzari. Gremese Editore, 1983.
