= Unknown Path =

- Directed by: José Antonio Nieves Conde
- Written by: José Fernández Gómez; José Antonio Nieves Conde; Antonio Pérez Sánchez
- Starring: Enrique Guitart; Alicia Palacios; Fernando Nogueras
- Cinematography: José F. Aguayo
- Edited by: Margarita de Ochoa
- Music by: Jesús Guridi
- Production company: Goya Producciones Cinematográficas
- Distributed by: Sevilla Films
- Release date: 28 October 1946
- Running time: 102 minutes
- Country: Spain
- Language: Spanish

Unknown Path (Spanish:Senda ignorada) is a 1946 Spanish crime film directed by José Antonio Nieves Conde and starring Enrique Guitart, Alicia Palacios and Fernando Nogueras.

== Cast ==
- Enrique Guitart as Guido Morani
- Alicia Palacios as Mary Kerrigan
- Fernando Nogueras as Frank Russell
- Jacinto San Emeterio as Alfred Kerrigan
- Porfiria Sanchíz as Sra. Walsen
- Ramón Martori as Fiscal
- José Prada as Inspector T.M. Clay
- Rafael Bardem as Defensor
- Manuel Kayser as Capellán
- Manuel Arbó as Preparador
- Dionisia de las Heras as Sra. Passon
- Ricardo Merino as John
- Ángel de Andrés as Peter
- Lolita Crespo as Recién casada
- José María Rodero as Recién casado
- Nicolás D. Perchicot as Juez
- Luis Latorre as Sr. Lucter
- Félix Fernández as Jefe del refugio
- Emilio Ruiz de Córdoba as Guía
- Mariano Alcón as Maître Florio
- Enrique Herreros as Espectador
- Lamela as Boxeador Joe
- Isabel González as Vendedora
- Jesús Castro Blanco as Carcelero
- Ángel Álvarez as Barman
- Monique Thibaut as Cancionista
- Yvonne as Bailarina
- Farrar as Bailarín

== Bibliography ==
- D'Lugo, Marvin. Guide to the Cinema of Spain. Greenwood Publishing, 1997.
