= Dante Testa =

Italian actor (1861–1923)

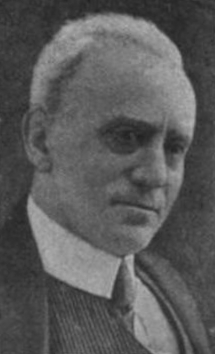
- Born: 24 August 1861; Turin, Italy
- Died: 3 March 1923 (aged 61); Turin, Italy
- Occupations: Actor, director
- Years active: 1880–1920
- Children: Adriana Testa; Eugenio Testa

Dante Testa (24 August 1861 – 3 March 1923) was an Italian stage and film actor and theatre and film director whose career began in the 1880s.

== Biography ==
Born in Turin, Dante Testa became one of great exponents of theatre in the Piedmontese language during the late 19th and early 20th-centuries. Initially working as a stage actor in a theatre company run by actor and playwright Teodoro Cuniberti and his wife Gemma Cuniberti, he also became a theatre manager. In the 1890s, he formed a company with playwright and actor Tancredi Milone, and formed another with Federico Bonelli, called the Compagnia Testa-Bonelli, in 1912. That year he also took over the management of the Teatro Rossini in Turin. In his later years he would open another theatre in Turin called the d'operetta Dante Testa.

During his stage career, Testa and his companies performed many works written by leading Piedmontese playwrights of the era, such as Federico Garelli, Mario Leoni, Nino Oxilia, Sandro Camasio and many others.

In 1910 he was hired Italian film pioneers Carlo Sciamengo and Giovanni Pastrone of Itala Film to begin work as an actor in the relatively new medium of motion pictures. He made his film debut at Itala Film in the 1910 short Sacrificata! (English: Sacrificed!). Among his more memorable roles at Itala was that of Karthalo, the High Priest of Carthage in the 1914 Pastrone directed epic Cabiria. At Itala, he would also direct two films; Padre (1912) and Lo scomparso (1913). Testa would work as an actor for other film companies such as Polidor Film and Ambrosio Film. His last film before his death was in the 1920 drama Terra, directed by his son Eugenio Testa.

== Death and legacy ==
Dante Testa died in his hometown of Turin in 1923 at age 61. He was the father of actors Adriana and Eugenio Testa.
