= Mary Santpere =

Spanish actress (1913–1992)

The Most Excellent Mary Santpere
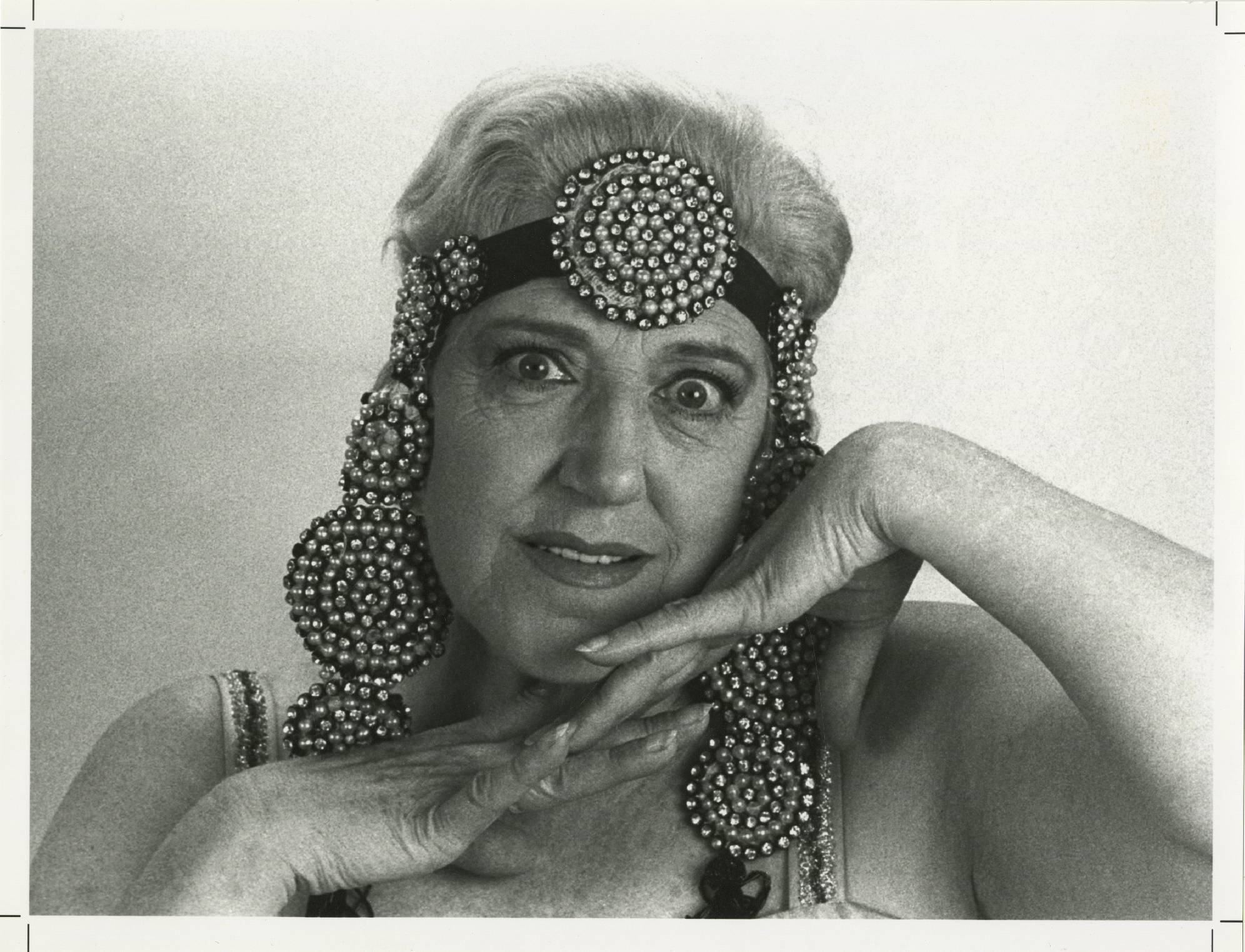
- Born: 1 September 1913; Barcelona, Spain
- Died: 23 September 1992 (aged 79); Madrid, Spain
- Other name: Mary Santpere Hernáez
- Occupation: Actress
- Years active: 1938-1992

Maria Santpere i Hernáez, know professionally as Mary Santpere (Catalan pronunciation: [ˈmaɾi ˌsamˈpeɾə]; 1 September 1913 – 23 September 1992) was a multifaceted Catalan actress, star, and comedian. Over her long career, she performed in theater, radio, film, and television.

== Family ==
Mary Santpere was born on a train en-route to Barcelona in 1913. She was the daughter of Rosa Hernáez i Esquirol and Josep Santpere i Pey. Her mother was a dancer, zarzuela singer, and actress. Her father, besides being a notable actor, sang, directed theater works, and was otherwise involved in the Barcelona theater business.

=== Marriage and children ===
Santpere married Francesc de Paula Pigrau i Francisco (1940-1987), and they had two children together: Josep Maria Pigrau i Santpere and Maria Rosa Pigrau i Santpere.

== Selected performances ==
=== Theater ===
- ¡Usted dirá!, with Alady. Teatre Còmic, Barcelona (1951)

=== Filmography ===
- Gentleman Thief (1944)
- Unexpected Conflict (1948)
- Eleven Pairs of Boots (1954)
- The Fan (1958)
- La banda de los tres crisantemos (1970)
- May I Borrow Your Girl Tonight? (1978)
- National Heritage (1981)

== Honors ==
- 1991 – Gold Medal of Merit in Labour (Kingdom of Spain, 26 April 1991).

== Bibliography ==
- Àngel Comas. Diccionari de llargmetratges: el cinema a Catalunya durant la Segona República, la Guerra Civil i el franquisme, (1930-1975). Cossetània Edicions, 2005.
