= Two Hearts (film) =

1943 Italian film by Carlo Borghesio

- Directed by: Carlo Borghesio
- Written by: Piero Ballerini; Carlo Borghesio
- Produced by: Domenico Valinotti
- Starring: Erzsi Simor; Károly Kovács; Osvaldo Genazzani
- Cinematography: Edoardo Lamberti
- Edited by: Carlo Borghesio
- Music by: Giovanni Fusco; Carlo Innocenzi
- Production companies: Consorzio Italiano Film; Dora Film
- Distributed by: Variety Distribution
- Release date: 3 June 1943
- Running time: 76 minutes
- Country: Italy
- Language: Italian

Two Hearts (Italian: Due cuori) is a 1943 Italian romance film directed by Carlo Borghesio and starring Erzsi Simor, Károly Kovács and Osvaldo Genazzani. It was shot at the Fert Studios in Turin. The film's sets were designed by the art director Guglielmo Borzone.

== Cast ==
- Erzsi Simor as Anna Serrati
- Károly Kovács as Andrea Dalmonte
- Osvaldo Genazzani as Gianni Serrati
- Nino Crisman as Ruggero Berti, il fidanzato di Anna
- Guglielmo Sinaz as De Marchis
- Olga Vittoria Gentilli as Zia Gertrude
- Ela Franceschetti as La cameriera
- Ernesto Conte as L'avvocato
- Domenico Grossetto
- Tania Lante
- Diana Mauri
- Tina Santi
- Felice Minotti

== Bibliography ==
- Poppi, Roberto. I registi: dal 1930 ai giorni nostri. Gremese Editore, 2002.
