= Alberto Ribeiro =

Portuguese singer and film actor

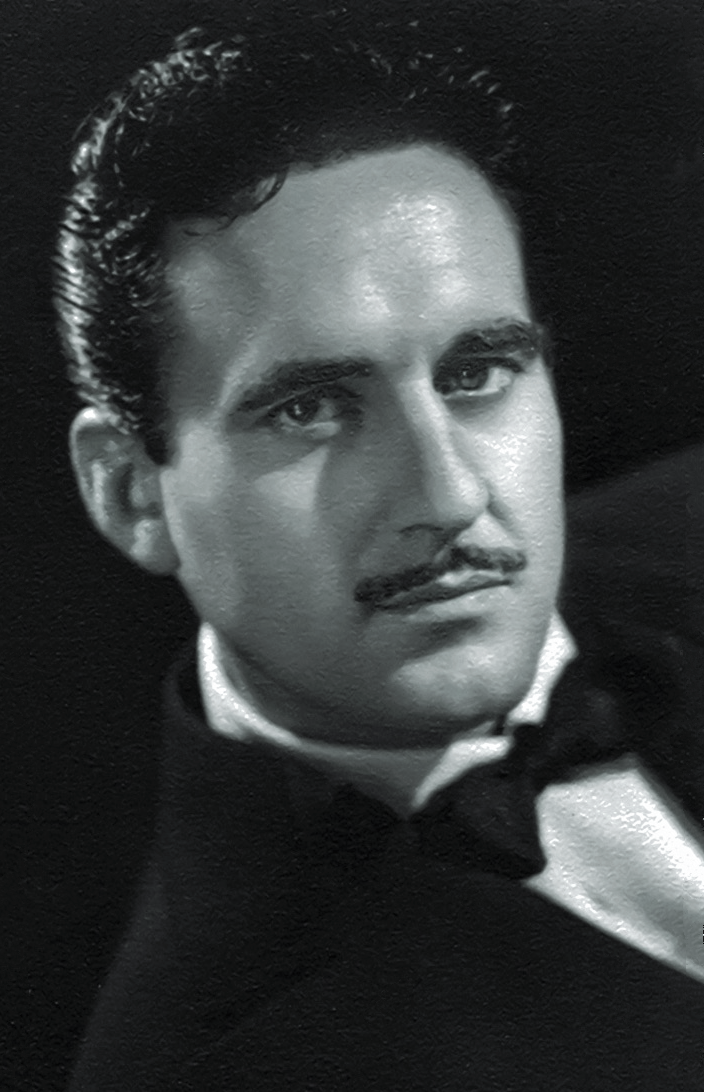
- Born: 29 February 1920; Ermesinde, Portugal
- Died: 2000; Portugal
- Occupation(s): Singer, actor

Alberto Ribeiro (1920–2000) was a Portuguese singer and film actor. He starred alongside Amália Rodrigues in the 1947 musical film Black Capes.

== Selected filmography ==
- Gentleman Thief (1944)
- Black Capes (1947)

== Bibliography ==
- Creekmur, Corey K. The International Film Musical. Oxford University Press, 2012.
