= Unexpected Conflict =

- Directed by: Ricardo Gascón
- Written by: Joaquín Dicenta (play); Alfonso Paso (play); Ricardo Gascón
- Produced by: José Carreras Planas
- Starring: Amedeo Nazzari; María Asquerino; Alfonso Estela; Maria Eugénia
- Cinematography: Enzo Serafin
- Edited by: Juan Palleja; Ramon Quadreny
- Music by: Juan Durán Alemany
- Production company: PECSA Films
- Distributed by: PECSA Films
- Release date: 26 January 1948
- Running time: 93 minutes
- Country: Spain
- Language: Spanish

Unexpected Conflict (Spanish: Conflicto inesperado) is a 1948 Spanish comedy film directed by Ricardo Gascón and starring Amedeo Nazzari, María Asquerino and Alfonso Estela. It was one of several films the Italian star Nazzari made in Spain in the late 1940s. The film was made by the Barcelona-based PESCA Films rather than in the major Madrid studios.

== Cast ==
- Amedeo Nazzari as Damian, the butler
- María Asquerino as Marìa
- Alfonso Estela as Prudencio
- Maria Eugénia as Pilar
- Osvaldo Genazzani as Miguel De La Mata
- Mary Santpere as Conchita De La Mata
- María Severini as Little girl
- Mona Tarridas as child
- Antonio Bofarull
- Modesto Cid
- Arturo Cámara
- María Escribano
- Pilar González
- Pedro Mascaró
- Antonio Miras
- Charito Montemar
- Fernando Porredón
- Enrique Tusquets
- Alberto Vialis

== Bibliography ==
- de España, Rafael. Directory of Spanish and Portuguese film-makers and films. Greenwood Press, 1994.
- Lancia, Enrico. Amedeo Nazzari. Gremese Editore, 1983.
