= Gentleman Thief (1946 film) =

- Directed by: Ricardo Gascón
- Written by: Manuel Bengoa; Ricardo Gascón
- Produced by: Aureliano Campa
- Starring: Luis Prendes; Silvia Morgan; Alberto Ribeiro
- Cinematography: Enzo Serafin
- Edited by: Juan Palleja
- Music by: Juan Durán Alemany
- Production company: Producciones Cinematográficas Huemir
- Release date: 28 January 1946
- Running time: 91 minutes
- Country: Spain
- Language: Spanish

Gentleman Thief (Spanish:Un ladrón de guante blanco) is a 1946 Spanish comedy film directed by Ricardo Gascón and starring Luis Prendes, Silvia Morgan and Alberto Ribeiro.

The film's sets were designed by Alfonso de Lucas.

== Cast ==
- Luis Prendes as Jaime Borrell
- Silvia Morgan as Carmen Rico
- Alberto Ribeiro as Guante Blanco
- José Jaspe as Star
- Óscar de Lemos as Parabellum
- Gema del Río as Elena
- Mary Santpere as Ernestina
- José María Oviés as Miguel Rico
- Modesto Cid

== Bibliography ==
- de España, Rafael. Directory of Spanish and Portuguese film-makers and films. Greenwood Press, 1994.
