= Mercedes (1933 film) =

1933 Spanish film

- Directed by: José María Castellví
- Written by: José María Castellví; Francisco Elías
- Starring: Rafael Arcos; Carmelita Aubert; Juan Bux
- Cinematography: José Gaspar
- Music by: Francisco Betoret; Julio Murillo; Jaime Planas
- Production company: Barcelona Films
- Release date: 13 November 1933
- Country: Spain
- Language: Spanish

Mercedes is a 1933 Spanish romantic comedy film directed by José María Castellví. It was a commercial success. It is now considered a lost film.

== Cast ==
- Rafael Arcos
- Carmencita Aubert
- Juan Bux
- Antoñita Colomé
- Antonio Estrada
- Héctor Morel
- Jaime Planas
- José Santpere
