= That Luzmela Girl (novel) =

1909 novel by Concha Espina

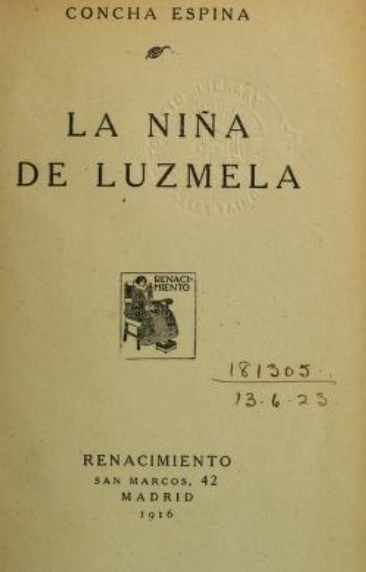
- Title page for La niña de Luzmela (1916 edition)
- Author: Concha Espina
- Language: Spanish, Italian
- Publication date: 1909
- Publication place: Spain
- Media type: Print

That Luzmela Girl (Spanish:La niña de Luzmela) is a novel by the Spanish writer Concha Espina, which was first published in 1909. In 1949, it was adapted into the film That Luzmela Girl directed by Ricardo Gascón.

== Bibliography ==
- de España, Rafael. Directory of Spanish and Portuguese film-makers and films. Greenwood Press, 1994.
