= The Drummer of Bruch =

1948 film

- Directed by: Ignacio F. Iquino
- Written by: Juan Lladó; Julio Coll; Salvador Cerdán; Ignacio F. Iquino
- Starring: Ana Mariscal
- Cinematography: Pablo Ripoll
- Edited by: Ignacio F. Iquino
- Music by: Ramón Ferrés
- Production company: Emisora Films
- Release date: 31 May 1948
- Running time: 95 minutes
- Country: Spain
- Language: Spanish

The Drummer of Bruch (Spanish: El tambor del Bruch) is a 1948 Spanish historical film directed by Ignacio F. Iquino and starring Ana Mariscal.

== Synopsis ==
In the midst of the Spanish War of Independence, Blas is accused of collaborating with the French army, causing the townspeople to label him a traitor. Little by little, and unwittingly, he will be involved in the rebel cause for independence. First, helping Montserrat to free her father, who is a prisoner of the French and later, joining the cause in the Battle of Bruch.

== Cast ==
- Ana Mariscal as Monserrat Raventós
- Carlos Agostí as Blas
- José Nieto
- Juan de Landa
- Rafael Luis Calvo as Coronel Carotte
- Jorge Greiner as Teniente Richard
- Enrique Magalona
- Jorge Morales
- Eugenio Testa
- Modesto Cid as Alcalde

== Bibliography ==
- Mira, Alberto. The A to Z of Spanish Cinema. Rowman & Littlefield, 2010.
