= José Antonio Nieves Conde =

Spanish film director (1911–2006)

- José Antonio Nieves Conde
- Born: 22 December 1911; Segovia, Castilla y León, Spain
- Died: 14 September 2006 (aged 94)
- Occupation: Film director
- Years active: 1947 – 1977

José Antonio Nieves Conde (22 December 1911 in Segovia, Castilla y León, Spain – 14 September 2006) was a Spanish film maker, journalist, and screenplay writer, the director of feature films such as Surcos [Furrows] (1951), Angustia [Anguish] (1947), and Balarrasa [Reckless] (1951).

== Biography ==
Nieves Conde, part of a large family and with a military father, was interested in film from the time he was a child. Upon finishing secondary school in Segovia, he began to study law in Madrid, joining the Falange Española de las JONS (Spanish Phalanx of the Councils of the National Syndicalist Offensive), a fascist political party, whose social ideology would have a profound impact on his cinematographic works. At the outbreak of the Spanish Civil War, he joined the front as a voluntary Falangist as part of the Nationalist or Rebel faction, opposing the unification of the Falange and the Requetés decreed by Franco, allying himself in the Falangist faction with the "hedillistas" (supporters of Manuel Hedilla, the successor of José Antonio Primo de Rivera, at the head of the Falange that was opposed to the unification as decreed by Franco) and reaching the rank of Infantry Second Lieutenant. He did not complete his university studies.

At the end of the war he returned to Segovia where he worked in the press and radio until he returned to Madrid to become a movie critic for the newspaper Pueblo. Between 1939 and 1942 he was an editor at the film magazine Primer Plano in charge of the section "Fuera de cuadro" (off-screen).

A friend of Carlos Fernández-Cuenca, Luis Gómez Mesa, and Rafael Gil, he began to work professionally in film with Gil in 1941 as a directing assistant. He worked with Gil on five of his movies from 1941 to 1946, including Viaje sin destino [Journey to Nowhere] (1942) and Tierra sedienta [Thirsty Land] (1945).

From 1942 onward he left Primer Plano and Pueblo—seemingly over disagreements over its direction—and dedicated himself professionally to film.

== Career ==
He directed his first film, Senda ignorada [Unknown Path] (1946), a gangster movie set in the United States, in 1946. This was followed by Angustia [Anguish] (1947), featuring Rafael Bardem and Julia Caba Alba, another crime film, which was declared of "national interest," and Llegada la noche [Night Arrival] (1949), with a script from Carlos Blanco.

In 1950 he directed Balarrasa [Reckless] (1950) with a script from Vicente Escrivá and with actors such as Fernando Fernán Gómez, María Rosa Salgado, Maruchi Fresno, Luis Prendes, and José Bódalo. This film was also categorized as being of national interest and is viewed as his first great popular and economic success. In 1950 he also co-directed Jack el negro [Black Jack] with Julien Duvivier.

He reached the summit of his career as a film maker in 1951 with Surcos [Furrows] (1951). This film, which has a clear social inspiration from a Falangist perspective, is considered to be one of the great films of Spanish cinema. It has a script from Natividad Zaro and Gonzalo Torrente Ballester based on a plot by Eugenio Montes and features Luis Peña and María Asquerino as its protagonists. The film caused controversy and was attacked by the Catholic Church for depicting taboo themes of the time, such as poverty, the black market, and rural migration, and as a result the ending of the film had to be changed before it could be screened. Additionally, despite winning national prizes it did not achieve commercial success.

== Filmography ==
- Unknown Path (1946)
- Anguish (1947)
- Night Arrival (1949)
- Black Jack (1950) a.k.a. Captain Blackjack
- Balarrasa (1951) a.k.a. Reckless
- Surcos (1951) a.k.a. Furrows
- Devil's Roundup (1952)
- Rebellion (1954) Duell der Herzen
- The Red Fish (1955)
- We're All Necessary (1956)
- The Legion of Silence 1956)
- The Tenant (1957) a.k.a. The Tenant
- Don Lucio y el hermano pío (1960)
- Prohibido enamorarse (1961)
- Por Tierras de las Siete Villas (1963)
- El Sonido prehistórico (1964) Sound from a Million Years Ago
- El Diablo también llora (1965)
- Cotolay (1966)
- Marta (1971)
- Historia de una traición (1971) a.k.a. The Great Swindle
- Las señoritas de mala compañía (1973)
- The Marriage Revolution (1974)
- Más allá del deseo (1976)
- Volvoreta (1976)
- Casa Manchada (1977) a.k.a. Impossible Love
