= Julio Coll =

Spanish screenwriter (1919–1993)

- Born: 7 April 1919; Camprodon, Spain
- Died: 17 January 1993 (aged 73)
- Occupations: Screenwriter; Film director
- Years active: 1947-1971

Julio Coll (7 April 1919 – 17 January 1993) was a Spanish screenwriter and film director. He wrote for more than 30 films between 1947 and 1971. In 1972, he was a member of the jury at the 22nd Berlin International Film Festival.

== Selected filmography ==
- The Drummer of Bruch (1948)
- In a Corner of Spain (1949)
- His Heart Awake (1949)
- Apartado de correos 1001 (1950)
- Facing the Sea (1951)
- Doubt (1951)
- Forbidden Trade (1952)
- Afternoon of the Bulls (1956)
- Fifth District (1958)
- Pyro... The Thing Without a Face (1964)
- Aragonese Nobility (1965)
- High Season for Spies (1966)
