= Enric Guitart i Matas =

- Born: 1 May 1909; Barcelona, Catalonia; Spain
- Died: 30 November 1999 (aged 90); Barcelona, Catalonia; Spain
- Other name: Enrique Guitart Matas
- Occupation: Actor
- Years active: 1927-1976 (film)

Enric Guitart i Matas (Barcelona, 1 May 1909 – 30 November 1999), better known as simply Enric Guitart, or Enrique Guitart in Spanish circles, was a Catalan and Spanish stage and film actor. He appeared in around forty films during his career. He was the son of the actor and theater director, Enric Guitart i Soldevila, and the actress Emília Matas. He portrayed Don Joaquín in the play La sirena varada, written by Alejandro Casona and released at the Teatro Español on 17 March 1934.

== Selected filmography ==
The following are only some of the Catalan and Spanish films in which Enric Guitart acted.

Year	Original film title (& English title, where there is one)	Role played	Director(s)	Notes	Ref.
1929	La Marieta de l’ull viu, o Baixant de la font del Gat		Josep Amich i Bert ("Amichatis") and Gastó A. Màntua		
1930	L'auca del senyor Esteve		Lucas Argilés		
1934	El novio de mamá		Florián Rey		
1936	El bailarín y el trabajador (The Dancer and the Worker)		Lluís Marquina		
1937–38	¡No quiero... no quiero!		Francisco Elías		
1940	Julieta y Romeo (Juliet and Romeo)		Josep Maria Castellví i Marimón		
1940	¡Rápteme usted!		Julio de Flechner		
1941	Su hermano y él		Lluís Marquina		
1942	Siempre mujeres		Carlos Arévalo		
1942	Vidas cruzadas		Lluís Marquina		
1945	Leyenda de feria		Juan de Orduña		
1946	Senda ignorada (Unknown Path)		José Antonio Nieves Conde		
1947	Vidas confusas		Jerónimo Mihura		
1948	El marqués de Salamanca		Edgar Neville		
1949	La mies es mucha		José Luis Sáenz de Heredia		
1949	Noventa minutos (Ninety Minutes)		Antonio del Amo		
1950	Don Juan		José Luís Sáenz de Heredia		
1950	El hijo de la noche (Child of the Night)		Ricard Gascón		
1951	El sueño de Andalucía / Andalousie (The Dream of Andalusia)		Luis Lucia		
1951	Servicio en la mar (Service at Sea)		Luis Suárez de Lezo		
1953	Intriga en el escenario (Plot on the Stage)		Feliciano Catalán		
1953	Hermano menor (Younger Brother)		Domingo Viladomat		
1961	Los atracadores		Francesc Rovira-Beleta		
1967	Operación Dalila		Luis de los Arcos		

== Bibliography ==
- Wright, Sarah. Tales of Seduction: The Figure of Don Juan in Spanish Culture. I.B.Tauris, 2012.
