= An Impossible Crime =

- Directed by: César Fernández Ardavín
- Written by: César Fernández Ardavín
- Cinematography: Manuel Berenguer
- Edited by: Magdalena Pulido
- Music by: Charles Williams
- Production companies: Cinesol; Clave Films
- Distributed by: CIFESA
- Release date: 2 September 1954
- Running time: 98 minutes
- Country: Spain
- Language: Spanish

An Impossible Crime (Spanish:¿Crimen imposible?) is a 1954 Spanish crime film directed by César Fernández Ardavín and starring José Suárez, Félix Fernández and Silvia Morgan.

== Cast ==
- José Suárez as Alberto
- Félix Fernández as Antonio Olmeda
- Silvia Morgan as María
- Ángel Picazo as Luis Escobedo
- Francisco Arenzana as Camarero
- Gérard Tichy as Eugenio Certal
- Irene Caba Alba as Portera
- Francisco Sánchez as Agente Garcelán
- Antonio Abad Ojuel
- Manuel Amado
- Manuel Arbó as Inspector jefe
- Juan Chacot
- Nani Fernández
- Manuel Guitián as Guía en museo
- Luis Moscatelli
- José G. Rey
- José Riesgo
- Salvador Soler Marí
- Vicente Ávila

== Bibliography ==
- Bentley, Bernard. A Companion to Spanish Cinema. Boydell & Brewer 2008.
