= Barrier to the North =

1950 film

- Directed by: Luis Trenker
- Written by: Luis Trenker; Ugo Guerra; Giuseppe Mangione; Sergio Pugliese; Enrico Santamaria
- Produced by: Nazareno Gallo
- Starring: Luis Trenker; Amedeo Nazzari; Marianne Hold; Margarete Genske
- Cinematography: Domenico Scala
- Music by: Carlo Rustichelli
- Production companies: Gallo Film; SAFIC
- Release date: 1950
- Running time: 95 minutes
- Country: Italy
- Language: Italian

Barrier to the North (Italian: Barriera a Settentrione) is a 1950 Italian mountain film directed by and starring Luis Trenker. It also stars Amedeo Nazzari, Marianne Hold and Margarete Genske. It is sometimes known by the alternative title of Mountain Smugglers.

== Plot ==
Two customs officers are shot dead by drug smugglers in the border area with Italy. Secret police officer Major Mauri decides to catch the perpetrators. Lieutenant Berti, who is supposed to carry out the action with him, is slightly injured after a climbing accident and is therefore not fully operational. Both decide to incorporate Berti's injury into their plan. You climb the Dolomites and stay in one of the mountain huts, where Berti is discovered by mountain guide Stefan Hassler. Berti pretends to have dragged himself injured to the mountain hut and is taken to his house by Stefan, where his niece Sandra is caring for him. Sandra and Berti get closer, but Sandra doesn't want a smuggler as a boyfriend, especially since she has a gun dealer at her side with her unloved fiancé Beppe.

Mauri and Berti pretend to be merchants from Milan, who in turn are actually watch smugglers. Stefan, who used to be an active smuggler, actually wanted to retire from the business, but his former boss forces him to join a big smuggling spree.

Stefan also asks Mauri to take part, with whom he had already successfully completed a "smuggling tour" days before, but in reality Mauri met with border police officers and organized the big attack on the smugglers.

The day of the big tour has come. Because of his injuries, Berti cannot take part in the rise and arrest of the gang and coordinates the attack on the smugglers over the radio. However, he is surprised and crushed by Beppe in the process. While Beppe goes to the mountain to warn the smugglers, Berti rushes to the police. Finally, there is a big exchange of fire between the smugglers and the police. As a result, Berti is shot; Mauri ends up shooting Stefan; the surviving smugglers are arrested.

== Cast ==
- Amedeo Nazzari as Major Mauri
- Luis Trenker as Stefano Hassler
- Marianne Hold as Sandra, seine Nichte
- Margarete Genske as Margaret
- Gabriele Ferzetti as Lieutenant Berti
- Luigi Pavese as Il direttore dell'albergo
- Angelo Dessy as Marco Hassler
- Saro Urzì as Il brigadiere
- Aldo Pini as Un finanziere
- L'Onorevole Cicerone as Un Sacerdote
- Gennaro Di Napoli
- Mario Terribile as Beppe

== Bibliography ==
- Roberto Chiti & Roberto Poppi. Dizionario del cinema italiano: Dal 1945 al 1959. Gremese Editore, 1991.
