= A Wife for Three Days =

1944 film

- Directed by: Fritz Kirchhoff
- Written by: Elisabeth Gürt (novel); Thea von Harbou
- Produced by: Max Pfeiffer
- Starring: Hannelore Schroth; Carl Raddatz; Ursula Herking
- Cinematography: Werner Krien
- Edited by: Hildegard Tegener
- Music by: Edmund Nick
- Production company: UFA
- Distributed by: Deutsche Filmvertriebs
- Release date: 28 April 1944
- Running time: 81 minutes
- Country: Germany
- Language: German

A Wife for Three Days (German: Eine Frau für drei Tage) is a 1944 German romantic drama film directed by Fritz Kirchhoff and starring Hannelore Schroth, Carl Raddatz and Ursula Herking. It was shot at the Babelsberg Studios in Potsdam and on location around Berlin and its vicinity including the River Havel and Wannsee. Filming also took place in Salzburg and Mondsee in Austria. The film's sets were designed by the art director Erich Kettelhut.

== Cast ==
- Hannelore Schroth as Lisa Rodenius
- Carl Raddatz as Hanns Jennerberg
- Ursula Herking as Annemarie Helbing
- Charlotte Witthauer as Lotte Feldhammer
- Werner Scharf as Benno Schmitz
- Maria Zidek as Frau Witting
- Erich Dunskus as Taxifahrer
- Ewald Wenck as Taxifahrer
- Heddy Sven
- Inge Stoldt
- Margarete Genske
- Jutta Carow
- Christa Seifert
- Herta Neupert
- Fritz Gerlach
- Walter Steinweg
- Walter Bechmann
- José Held

== Bibliography ==
- Jacobsen, Wolfgang. Babelsberg: das Filmstudio. Argon, 1994.
- Kreimeier, Klaus. The Ufa Story: A History of Germany's Greatest Film Company, 1918-1945. University of California Press, 1999.
- Rentschler, Eric. The Ministry of Illusion: Nazi Cinema and Its Afterlife. Harvard University Press, 1996.
