= Juan Manuel Soriano =

Spanish voice actor (1920–1995)

- Born: 1920; Santa Cruz de Tenerife, Spain
- Died: 10 October 1995 (aged 74–75); Barcelona, Spain
- Occupation: Voice actor

Juan Manuel Soriano (1920 – 10 October 1995) was a Spanish voice actor and his career spanned over 50 years including a radio program of Don Juan Tenorio. In radio, he dubbed American actors such as Clark Gable, Kirk Douglas and James Stewart. He created the Radio Nacional de España (RNE) radio program Teatro invisible. He also won a Premios Ondas for Best Actor in the RNE programs in 1957.

== Filmography ==
- In a Corner of Spain (1949)
- Unas páginas en negro(1950)
- Érase una vez (1950)
- Facing the Sea (1951)
- Luna de sangre (1952)
- Hay un camino a la derecha (1953)
- Once pares de botas (1954)
- La pecadora (1956)
- The Legion of Silence (1956)
- El último verano (1962)
- ¿Quién tiene la palabra? (TV series) (1963)
- ¿Quién es quién? (TV series) (1963)
- Los Tarantos (1963)
- Tarjeta de visita (1964)
- La sunamita (1965)
- Amor amor amor (1965)
- La fira de Santa Lluçia (1975)
- Som i serem (1981)

== Bibliography ==
- Enciclopèdia Espasa Suplement dels anys 1995-96, pàg. 159 (ISBN 84-239-4366-6)
