= Artur Agostinho =

Portuguese journalist

Artur Fernandes Agostinho (25 December 1920 – 22 March 2011) was a Portuguese journalist, radio host, actor, publicist and writer, recipient of the Military Order of Saint James of the Sword (Ordem Militar de Sant'Iago da Espada).

== Career ==
Born and raised in Lisbon, Artur Agostinho went to Liceu Camões, did amateur theatre at Campolide Atlético Clube and entered the Instituto Superior Técnico in order to study electrical engineering at the largest school of engineering in Portugal, but gave up when one of his professors there, Professor Ilharco, told him he wasn't the engineering-type of person. He started on small amateur radio stations such as Rádio Luso around 1938. He went on to work for several large radio stations (Rádio Peninsular, Clube Radiofónico de Portugal) until he was invited by Rádio Clube Português as a collaborator, where he received some money for his work for the first time. In 1944 he turned professional and the following year moved to Emissora Nacional. Starting in 1947, he became a renowned live football commentator and reporter on the radio Emissora Nacional and later on Rádio Renascença. As an actor, Artur Agostinho had roles in films such as Cais do Sodré (1946), O Leão da Estrela (1947), Capas Negras (1947), Cantiga da Rua (1950), Sonhar é Fácil (1951), O Tarzan do 5º Esquerdo (1958), Dois Dias no Paraíso (1958), O Testamento do Senhor Napumoceno (1997), A Sombra dos Abutres (1998) and Tudo Isto é Fado (2004). At RTP, he presented the first Portuguese television competition Quem Sabe, Sabe and took part in programs such as O Senhor que se Segue and No Tempo Em Que Você Nasceu. After that, he would be part of several tv series and soap operas, such as Casa da Saudade, Ganância, Clube das Chaves, Ana e os Sete, Sonhos Traídos, Inspector Max, Tu e Eu, Pai à Força and Perfeito Coração.

As a notable personality in Portuguese radio broadcast and cinema until then, after the Carnation Revolution of 1974 in Lisbon and the fall of the Estado Novo regime, he was victim of prejudice and ostracism by the new left-wing ruling forces in Portugal. However, in the following years he would overcome that period of his life and achieve renewed notability in radio, television and cinema.

Because he was a lifelong affiliated member of Sporting Clube de Portugal, in April 2011, Artur Agostinho's name became the official name of the Estádio José Alvalade's auditorium.

== Personal life ==
Artur Agostinho had a daughter, Emília Agostinho, who lost her first child, a 7 year old boy named Rodrigo, and her first husband, in a car crash. She did translation work until her retirement. She is mother of João from a second marriage and grandmother of Leonor.
