= Together (1943 film) =

1943 film

- Directed by: László Cserépy
- Written by: Andor Matolcsy
- Produced by: Róbert Bánky
- Starring: Antal Páger; Erzsi Simor; Károly Kovács
- Cinematography: Barnabás Hegyi
- Music by: Olivér Pálmás
- Production company: Iris Film
- Release date: 1 October 1943
- Running time: 79 minutes
- Country: Hungary
- Language: Hungarian

Together (Hungarian: Kettesben) is a 1943 Hungarian comedy film directed by László Cserépy and starring Antal Páger, Erzsi Simor and Károly Kovács. It was made at the Hunnia Studios in Budapest and on location around Győr.

== Cast ==
- Antal Páger as Pávay Szilárd, igazgató
- Erzsi Simor as Zsuzsanna
- Károly Kovács as Tihamér, Zsuzsanna võlegénye
- Ilona Kökény as Zsuzsanna anyja
- Róbert Bánky as Zsuzsanna apja
- József Legenyei as Rádiószpíker
- János Makláry as Csónakmester
- Jenö Danis as Csõsz
- Béla Tompa as Kertész

== Bibliography ==
- Juhász, István. Kincses magyar filmtár 1931–1944: az eredeti forgatókönyvből 1931 és 1944 között létrejött hazai mozgóképekről. Kráter, 2007.
- Rîpeanu, Bujor. (ed.) International Directory of Cinematographers, Set- and Costume Designers in Film: Hungary (from the beginnings to 1988). Saur, 1981.
