= Maria Eugénia =

Portuguese actress (1927–2016)

- Born: 1 April 1927; Lisbon, Portugal
- Died: 25 August 2016 (aged 89); Lisbon, Portugal
- Other name: Maria Eugenia Rodrigues Branco
- Occupation: Actress
- Years active: 1931–1948

Maria Eugénia (1 April 1927 – 25 August 2016) was a Portuguese stage and film actress. She appeared in seven Portuguese and Spanish films in the late 1940s. Eugénia appeared opposite the Italian actor Amedeo Nazzari in a couple of Barcelona-made films including the comedy Unexpected Conflict (1948). She received an offer from Vittorio De Sica to work with him, but she turned it down.

Eugénia came from an artistic family, and was the daughter of a musician. She retired from acting following her marriage. She is the mother of the Portuguese poet Fernando Pinto do Amaral.

== Selected filmography ==
- A Menina da Rádio (1944)
- When the Angels Sleep (1947)
- O Leão da Estrela (1947)
- Unexpected Conflict (1948)

== Bibliography ==
- Lancia, Enrico. Amedeo Nazzari. Gremese Editore, 1983.
