= Forbidden Trade =

- Directed by: Javier Setó
- Written by: Julio Coll; José Germán Huici
- Cinematography: Emilio Foriscot
- Edited by: Antonio Cánovas
- Music by: Augusto Algueró
- Production company: IFI Producción
- Distributed by: IFI Distribuición
- Release date: 1952
- Running time: 85 minutes
- Country: Spain
- Language: Spanish

Forbidden Trade (Spanish: Mercado prohibido) is a 1952 Spanish crime film directed by Javier Setó. Its plot concerns penicillin smuggling.

The film's sets were designed by Miguel Lluch.

== Cast ==
- Modesto Cid
- Isabel de Castro
- Manuel de Mozos
- Manuel A. Deabella
- Alfonso Estela
- Manolo García
- Manuel Gas
- José Gayán
- Manuel Monroy
- Silvia Morgan
- Carlos Otero
- Jesús Redondo
- Miguel Ángel Valdivieso

== Bibliography ==
- Bentley, Bernard. A Companion to Spanish Cinema. Boydell & Brewer 2008.
