= Doubt (1951 film) =

- Directed by: Julio Salvador
- Written by: Julio Coll; Emilio Hernández Pino (play); Manuel Tamayo
- Produced by: Miguel Grau
- Cinematography: Federico G. Larraya
- Edited by: Antonio Isasi-Isasmendi
- Music by: Ramón Ferrés
- Production company: Emisora Films
- Release date: 8 October 1951
- Running time: 104 minutes
- Country: Spain
- Language: Spanish

Doubt (Spanish: Duda) is a 1951 Spanish drama film directed by Julio Salvador and starring Conrado San Martín, Elena Espejo and Francisco Rabal. A mixture of thriller and melodrama, it sees a lawyer forces to defend his wife in court after she is accused of murdering her first husband.

== Synopsis ==
Two years after the death of a rich antiquarian, his wife will be accused of his death, after her appearance in his closet of a bottle of arsenic. Her new husband is a lawyer who will be in charge of her defense.

== Cast ==
- Conrado San Martín as Enrique Villar / Payá
- Elena Espejo as Ana María Figueroa
- Francisco Rabal as Rafael Figueroa
- Mary Lamar as Enfermera
- Carlo Tamberlani as Comisario
- Rosita Valero as Farmacéutica
- María Brú as Doña Teresa
- Xan das Bolas as Sereno
- Modesto Cid as Presidente del tribunal
- Emilio Fábregas as Farmacéutico
- Ramón Giner as Testigo
- José Goula as Juez
- Luis Induni as Ayudante del comisario
- Francisco Linares-Rivas as Fiscal
- Juan Monfort as Ayudante del comisario
- Rafael Navarro as Testigo
- Luis Pérez de León as Manzanares
- Eugenio Testa as Sr. Herrera

== Bibliography ==
- Labanyi, Jo & Pavlović, Tatjana. A Companion to Spanish Cinema. John Wiley & Sons, 2012.
