= Il mostro di Frankenstein =

1921 film

- Directed by: Eugenio Testa
- Starring: Luciano Albertini; Umberto Guarracino
- Cinematography: Alvaro di Simone
- Production company: Albertini-Film
- Release date: 4 September 1921
- Country: Italy

Il mostro di Frankenstein (transl. The Monster of Frankenstein) is a 1921 Italian silent film directed by Eugenio Testa. The film features actor Luciano Albertini as Baron von Frankenstein and Umberto Guarracino as The Monster. Albertini was known for his strong-man films at the time, particularly the Sansone film series. The film is a lost film, with only a photo, some promotional materials, and a single published review left to give insight to what the film was.

After the film's release, it became the last Italian production for Albertini-Film, which seemingly re-located to Germany after this film. Critics and film historians have sometimes credited the film as an early example of a horror film, while others stated there wasn't enough evidence to truly know what kind of film style it was attempting.

== Background and production ==
While Italian cinema had some success in the early decades of the 20th century, following World War I saw a decline in production with 60 films produced in 1920 and only 20 in 1924. Il mostro di Frankenstein was produced by Albertini-Film, which was founded in 1919.

Shooting of the film took place in Turin Among the cast was Luciano Albertini as Baron von Frankenstein. Albertini appeared in several "strong man" films that became popular in the wake of Bartolomeo Pagano's role as the muscular slave Maciste in Cabiria (1914). In his career, Albertini relied upon his athletic physique. He was predominantly known for the popular Sansone film series which he was in at least eight films of. When Il mostro di Frankenstein was advertised, it was promoted with the name "Sansone" over the actor's own name.

Writing in his 1973 book The Frankenstein Legend: A Tribute to Mary Shelley and Boris Karloff, Donald Glut was unable to outline any substantial details about the film other than "there is a confrontation between the creator and creature in a shadowy cave." Russ Hunter stated these assertions come from a Belgian flyer for the film that shows a hand-drawn sketch of Frankenstein's monster in what appears to be a cave. According to the only known review of the film in Kines, an Italian weekly publication, the film was a loose adaptation of the original source material.

== Release and reception ==
The film was submitted to the Italian censors on 26 November 1920. Cuts to the film were suggested as quickly as 21 December. the film was not released in Italy until 4 September 1921. There is evidence that the film was distributed both domestically and internationally, but the full context of this is unclear.

Variations of the film's title appear in different publicity materials. The 1922 Cinema Vittoria, Cinema Pace and Cinema Auorora posters from Milan titled the film Il mostro di Frankenstein while later 1926 provincial releases of the film title it Il mostro di Frankestein. New negatives, promotional materials and title cards for the film were being ordered as late as December 1924 in Italian, French, English and Spanish. One surviving posters shows that at least one Italian cinema had planned on exhibiting the film as late as 1926.

Critic Guglielmo Giannini stated that "the authors have missed a great opportunity for making an excellent film [...] because they haven't taken into account the formidable material they had at their disposal or they only used it sporadically." The only praise Giannini gave was towards Umbero Guarracino's "scary" performance as The Monster.

== Legacy ==
The film was the last film Eugenio Testa directed and he never acted in Italy again after. It was also Luciano Albertini and Albertini Films last Italian production as the company would seemingly relocate to Germany afterwards.

Scholars of Italian cinema generally identify I Vampiri (1957) as the "first" significant example of an Italian horror film. In 2017, Russ Hunter wrote in the Journal of Italian Cinema & Media Studies that Il mostro di Frankenstein was increasingly identified as Italy's first horror film. This includes Louis Paul in 2005 citing it as the earliest example of an Italian horror film, while Gino Moliterno in Historical Dictionary of Italian Cinema included along with Malombra (1917) as sole entries in the genre as "Italian silent cinema appears to have little interest in the horror genre." Hunter noted that many of the silent era films that might now be coined as horror were referred to simply as cinéma fantastique, a broad term that has tended to encompass horror, science fiction and fantasy films. Hunter argued that the supposed nature of the subject matter, based largely on the title is seen to automatically qualify it as a horror film. Hunter concluded that prior to I Vampiri there was no horror film cycles in Italy prior to that film's release.

== See also ==
- Frankenstein in popular culture
- List of lost films
- List of films featuring Frankenstein's monster

== Sources ==
- Hunter, Russ (March 2017). "'I Have a Picture of the Monster!': Il mostro di Frankenstein and The Search for Italian Horror Cinema". Journal of Italian Cinema & Media Studies. 5 (2): 159–172. doi:10.1386/jicms.5.2.159_1.
- Workman, Christopher; Howarth, Troy (2016). Tome of Terror: Horror Films of the Silent Era. Midnight Marquee Press. ISBN 978-1936168-68-2.
