= Señora Ama =

1955 film

- Directed by: Julio Bracho
- Written by: Jacinto Benavente (play); Julio Bracho; Enrique Llovet
- Produced by: Fernando de Fuentes Jr. Eduardo Manzanas Brochero
- Starring: Dolores del Río
- Cinematography: Theodore J. Pahle
- Edited by: Antonio Martínez
- Music by: Salvador Ruiz de Luna
- Distributed by: Diana Films; Union Films
- Release date: 28 January 1957
- Running time: 90 minutes
- Countries: Spain; Mexico
- Language: Spanish

Señora Ama (English: The Lady of the House) is a 1955 Spanish-Mexican drama film directed by Julio Bracho. It was filmed in 1955 and released in 1957. It starred Dolores del Río based in the same name play by Jacinto Benavente.

== Plot ==
The story is about the marriage between Feliciano (Jose Suarez) and Dominica (Dolores del Rio), owners of a ranch. They have years of marriage, and Dominica has not been able to conceive any children. Feliciano has a reputation as a womanizer and he fathered many illegitimate children. It is implied that his infidelity due to the inability of his wife to give him a son. Dominica defends her husband in public, but reproaches him in private. But she never deviates from her commitment to love him until death.

In the house also lives Maria Juana (María Luz Galicia), younger sister of Dominica. A very strong sexual tension occurs between her and Feliciano. The film presents a clear contrast between Dominica, a woman of spirit, and Maria Juana, a woman of flesh.

It is decided by her family that María Juana must marry the brother of Feliciano, José. María Juana is not in love with José and reluctantly agrees. It is therefore not a love triangle but a rectangle consisting of Feliciano, Dominica, María Juana and José.

== Cast ==
- Dolores del Río - as Dominica
- José Suárez - as Feliciano
- María Luz Galicia - as María Juana
- Manuel Monroy - as José

== Comments ==
It suggested a comparison between the film and another taken from the work of Jacinto Benavente, The Unloved Woman. This is not bad but lacks the ferocity, simplicity and perversity of the feelings of the other. The oppressive claustrophobia of the ranch house of The Unloved Woman is missing. The script does not extract everything possible from the situation.

Luis Gasca wrote in 1976: "This film is little more than a text illustration".
