= High Season for Spies =

1966 film

- Directed by: Julio Coll
- Written by: Julio Coll; Helmut Harun; Dick Haskins; José Germán Huici
- Based on: O Caso Bardot by Dick Haskins (António de Andrade Albuquerque)
- Produced by: Alfons Carcasona; António Vilar
- Starring: António Vilar; Letícia Román; Peter van Eyck
- Cinematography: Pedro Martín; Mario Pacheco
- Edited by: Rosa G. Salgado
- Music by: José Luis Navarro
- Production companies: Hispamer Films; International Germania Film; Producciones A.V.
- Distributed by: Constantin Film (Germany)
- Release date: 29 July 1966
- Running time: 86 minutes
- Countries: Portugal; Spain; West Germany
- Language: German

High Season for Spies (German: Sechs Pistolen jagen Professor Z, lit. 'Six Pistols to Hunt Professor Z') is a 1966 Eurospy film directed by Julio Coll and starring António Vilar, Letícia Román and Peter van Eyck. It was made as a co-production between Portugal, Spain and West Germany. The film's action takes place around Lisbon, and concerns attempts by various secret agents to steal a formula.

== Plot ==
This plot uses the names, character nationalities and settings of the German version (out of the which the Italian dub was made).

In Lisbon, Professor Zandor developed a formula on behalf of the industrialist Bardot: He succeeded in producing a steel mixture that is completely bulletproof and, as a result, makes conventional weapons ineffective. In doing so, he gets the interest of all kinds of agents from different countries, but also crooks who are after the alloy, but also after Professor Z himself. One day, the scientist is kidnapped out of his laboratory, and those present, Ellen Green, Zandor's assistant, and Mr. Bardot himself, are witnesses. Zandor's client now fears that the secret formula could be leaked to a foreign power. The most important nations then send their best people to the Portuguese capital, including Jack Haskins from the US and Pierre Genet from France. Both men have known each other for some time and sometimes cooperate, although they have also appeared as competitors.

The events have led to the fact that now Lisbon is not only a fairground for spies, but also various dark figures arrive on site, including a certain Johannsson, the head of a gang, as well as the opaque Jenny Renoir and the unscrupulous killer Peterson. Local Commissioner Oliveira has his hands full to ensure that his Lisbon does not turn into a battlefield anytime soon. France's agent Genet finds out how dangerous Johannsson is when, on arrival, he barely escapes an attack by Johannsson's men and is saved thanks to Haskins' mission. Haskins receives the first trace of Zandor through a letter he discovers in Ellen's handbag. He is in danger himself, but cannot track down the professor. A splendid party that Bardot is hosting one evening brings everyone involved together for the first time: Haskins, Genet, Johannsson, Ellen Green, Jenny Renoir, Commissioner Oliveira and Mike Danham, a Bardot employee. In the course of the evening, Bardot becomes the victim of a sophisticated assassination attempt. Haskins and Genet discover clues that suggest a connection between the murder and knowledge of the formula of the invention. They also find out that an affair is simmering between Bardot's wife and Danham. Haskins confronts the two and coaxes them to admit that Mike is Bardot's killer. Before Haskins can find out more about the crime, the couple is shot by Johannsson.

The gang boss flees headlong, and a wild chase ensues, in which Haskins takes Johannsson. Haskins and his French colleague use a ruse to determine the true role of Ellen Green: She is her British colleague, the agent from London, and has implanted herself in Zandor's environment as his assistant. She is behind the "kidnapping" of Zandor in order to actually protect him from the villains. Johannsson manages to free himself and, with the help of his people, to determine Zandor's whereabouts. However, Ellen Green escapes in a car with her protégé, the professor. However, Johannsson's people deposited a time bomb there. Johannsson's men pursue the refugees. Professor Zandor is fatally shot in the chase. For their part, Haskins and Genet chase after Johannsson. They manage to save Ellen just in time from the car exploding. However, they cannot find the formula. Apparently the professor destroyed them beforehand. And so the military balance of terror is preserved.

== Cast ==
- António Vilar as Pierre Genet [German and Italian dubs]/ Dick Haskins [Spanish and English dubs]
- Letícia Román as Ethel Green [Italian and Spanish dub]/ Ellen Green [German and English dubs]
- Peter van Eyck as Kramer [Spanish and English dubs] / Jack Haskins [German and Italian dubs]
- Américo Coimbra as Mike Danham [German, Italian and Spanish dubs]/ João [English dub]
- Mikaela as Anne Bardot
- Artur Semedo as Mr. Bardot
- Klausjürgen Wussow as Johansson [German and Italian dub]/ Bonnard (Spanish dub?)
- Corny Collins as Jenny Renoir
- Ricardo Rubinstein as Commissioner Oliveira
- José Cardoso as Professor Zandor
- Ricardo Valle as Agent Andrade
- Frank Braña
- Antonio Pica
- Mario Barros as Bob
- Hermann Greegh as Peterson
- Richard Wall as Antonio

== Bibliography ==
- Peter Cowie & Derek Elley. World Filmography: 1967. Fairleigh Dickinson University Press, 1977.
