= An American in Toledo =

1960 film

- Directed by: Carlos Arévalo; José Luis Monter
- Written by: Jaime Garcia-Herranz; Sergio Corbucci; José Luis Monter
- Produced by: Sergio Newman
- Starring: Silvia Morgan; Georges Rivière
- Cinematography: Emilio Foriscot
- Edited by: Pepita Orduna
- Music by: Augusto Algueró
- Production company: Producciones Cinematográficas Hispamer Films
- Distributed by: CIFESA
- Release date: 31 October 1960
- Running time: 85 minutes
- Country: Spain
- Language: Spanish

An American in Toledo (Spanish: Un americano en Toledo) is a 1960 Spanish comedy film directed by Carlos Arévalo and José Luis Monter and starring Silvia Morgan and Georges Rivière. It was shot in Agfacolor and distributed by CIFESA films.

== Cast ==
In alphabetical order

- Ángel Arrabal
- Matilde Artero
- Ángel Calero as Alguacir
- Juan Calvo as Comisario
- María Cañete as Sra. Luisa
- Concha Cañizares
- María Cofán
- Manuel Flores
- Francisco Antonio Gómez
- Guillermo Hidalgo
- José Isbert as Román
- Amy Márquez
- Antonio Molino Rojo
- Mario Moreno as Police stenographer
- Silvia Morgan as María
- Pinky Prindle
- Georges Rivière as Arthur
- Elías Rodríguez

== Bibliography ==
- Jesús García Rodrigo. José Isbert, en el recuerdo de Albacete. Diputación de Albacete, 1998.
