= Black Capes =

1947 film by Armando de Miranda

- Directed by: Armando de Miranda
- Written by: Alberto Barbosa; Jose Galhardo; Luis Galhardo
- Produced by: Armando de Miranda; Edmundo Ferreira de Almeida
- Starring: Amália Rodrigues; Alberto Ribeiro; Artur Agostinho
- Cinematography: Octávio Bobone
- Edited by: Armando de Miranda
- Music by: Jaime Mendes
- Production company: Produtores Associados
- Distributed by: Exclusivos Triunfo
- Release date: 11 May 1947
- Running time: 103 minutes
- Country: Portugal
- Language: Portuguese

Black Capes (Portuguese:Capas Negras) is a 1947 Portuguese musical film directed by Armando de Miranda and starring Amália Rodrigues, Alberto Ribeiro and Artur Agostinho. The film takes its name from the black capes worn by the students at the University of Coimbra. The film was an enormous success at the box office in both Portugal and Brazil, despite criticism in Coimbra that depictions of the city and its musical tradition were not accurately represented.

The film marked the debut of Amália Rodrigues, previously known as a radio star. The film's popularity led producers to rush out another film Fado: The Story of a Singer, which was loosely based on her own life story.

== Cast ==
- Amália Rodrigues as Maria de Lisboa
- Alberto Ribeiro as José Duarte
- Artur Agostinho as Manecas
- Vasco Morgado as Jorge
- Barroso Lopes as Coca-Bichinhos
- Humberto Madeira as Já-Cá-Canta
- António Sacramento as Judge
- Graziela Mendes
- Joaquim Miranda
- Fernando Silva as Cunha, the pawnbroker
- Manuela Bonito
- Alfonso Branco
- João Calazans
- Cremilda de Sousa as Dancer
- Maria Emília Vilas
- Antonio Gonçalves as Dancer
- Adozinda Mariano
- Domingo Marques
- Regina Montenegro
- Passos Pereira
- Génia Silva
- Tomás de Macedo

== Bibliography ==
- Creekmur, Corey K. The International Film Musical. Oxford University Press, 2012.
