= Concha Espina =

Spanish writer

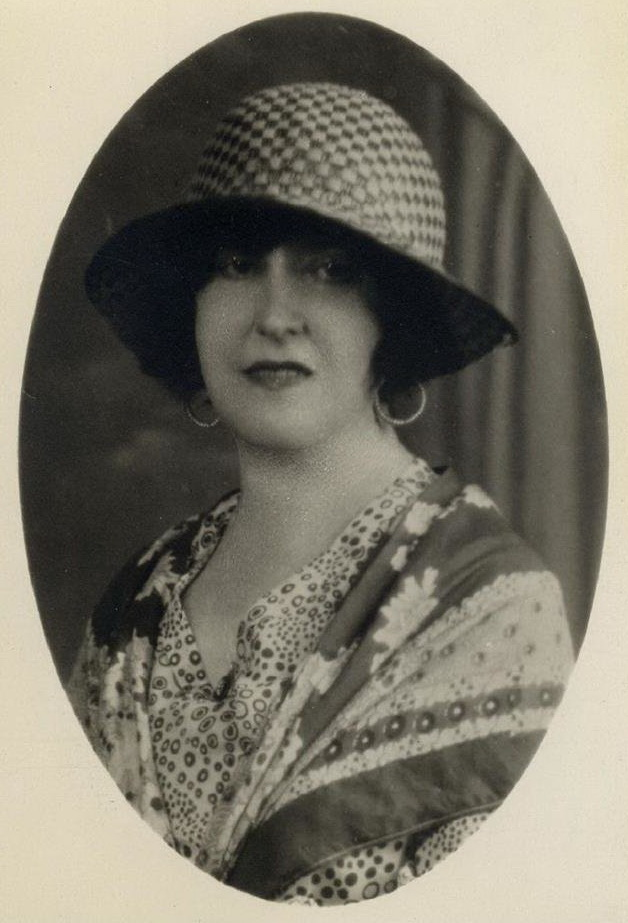
- Concha Espina (1929)
- Born: María de la Concepción Jesusa Basilisa Rodríguez-Espina y García-Tagle; 15 April 1869 or 1877 or 1 April 1879 or 15 April 1879; Santander, Spain
- Died: 19 May 1955 (age about 80); Madrid, Spain
- Occupation: writer

María de la Concepción Jesusa Basilisa Rodríguez-Espina y García-Tagle, short form Concha Espina ([ˈkontʃa esˈpina], 15 April 1869 or 1877 or 1 April 1879 or 15 April 1879 in Santander – 19 May 1955 in Madrid), was a Spanish writer. She was nominated for a Nobel prize in literature 25 times in 28 years.

== Life ==
María de la Concepción Jesusa Basilisa Rodríguez-Espina y García-Tagle was born in Santander, the seventh of 10 children of Víctor Rodríguez-Espina y Olivares and Ascensión García-Tagle y de la Vega. On 12 January 1893 she married Ramón de la Serna y Cueto, and they moved to Valparaíso, Chile during some years. The marriage had 5 children: Ramón, Víctor, José, Josefina (wife of Regino Sainz de la Maza) and Luis. The couple separated in 1909, and legally in 1934. In 1940 she went blind, but she continued to write. She died at 86, on 19 May 1955 in Madrid.

Her best known novel is called That Luzmela Girl (La niña de Luzmela) and describes life in the Cantabrian village of Mazcuerras, today also known as Luzmela after her. A Madrid metro station of line 9, Concha Espina, is named after her. A major avenue in the same area is called Avenida de Concha Espina.

== Works ==
- La Eterna Visita.
- Mujeres del Quijote, 1903.
- Mis Flores, 1904.
- El Rabión, 1907.
- Trozos de Vida, 1907
- That Luzmela Girl (La niña de Luzmela), 1909. Novela.
- La Ronda de los Galanes, 1910.
- Despertar para Morir, 1910.
- Agua de Nieve, 1911.
- La Esfinge Maragata, 1914. Fastenrath Award de la Real Academia Española.
- La Rosa de los Vientos, 1915. Novela.
- Al Amor de las Estrellas, 1916.
- El Jayón, 1916. Award Espinosa y Cortina de la Real Academia Española.
- Don Quijote en Barcelona, 1917. Conferency 19-12-1916.
- Ruecas de Marfil, 1917.
- Simientes. Páginas iniciales, 1918.
- Naves en el Mar, 1918.
- Talín. Novela Inédita, 1918.
- Pastorelas, 1920.
- El Metal de los Muertos, 1920.
- Dulce Nombre, 1921. Novela.
- Cuentos, 1922.
- El Cáliz Rojo, 1923.
- Tierras del Aquilón, 1924. Award Castillo de Chirel de la Real Academia Española.
- Arboladuras, 1925.
- Cura de Amor, 1925.
- El Secreto de un Disfraz, 1925.
- Altar Mayor, 1926. Premio Nacional de Literatura de España 1927.
- Las Niñas Desaparecidas, 1927.
- Aurora de España, 1927.
- El Goce De Robar, 1928.
- La Virgen Prudente, 1929.
- El Príncipe del Cantar, 1930.
- Copa De Horizontes, 1930.
- Siete Rayos de Sol, 1930.
- Llama de Cera, 1931.
- Singladuras. Viaje Americano, 1932.
- Entre la Noche y el Mar, 1933.
- Candelabro, 1933.
- La Flor de Ayer, 1934.
- Vidas Rotas, 1935.
- Nadie Quiere a Nadie, 1938.
- Retaguardia. (Imágenes de vivos y muertos), 1937.
- El Desierto Rubio, 1938.
- Reconquista, 1938.
- Esclavitud y Libertad, Diario de una Prisionera, 1938.
- Las Alas Invencibles. Novela de Amores, de Aviación y de Libertad, 1938.
- Casilda de Toledo. Vida de Santa Casilda, 1938.
- Luna Roja: Novelas de la Revolución, 1939.
- Princesas del Martirio, 1940.
- La Tiniebla Encendida, 1940.
- El Fraile Menor, 1942.
- Moneda Blanca. La Otra, 1942.
- La Segunda Miés, 1943.
- Victoria en América, 1944.
- Obras completas de Concha Espina, 1944.
- El Más Fuerte, 1945.
- Un Valle en el Mar, 1949. II Award Miguel de Cervantes Saavedra de Periodismo Ministry of Information and Tourism.
- De Antonio Machado a su Grande y Secreto Amor, 1950. Letters.
- Una Novela de Amor, 1953.
- Aurora de España, 1955

== Sources ==
- modernismo98y14.com
- escritoras.com
- biografiasyvidas.com
- Charles Wesley Smith; Concha Espina (1933). Concha Espina and Her Women Characters. George Peabody college for teachers.
- Maria Elvira Hernandez (2007). Concha Espina: A feminist perspective. California State University, Fresno. ISBN 978-0-549-12629-4.
- Elizabeth Rojas Auda (1998). Visión y ceguera de Concha Espina: su obra comprometida. Editorial Pliegos. ISBN 9788488435774.
