= The Louts =

- Directed by: Juan Lladó
- Written by: Manuel Bengoa; Ignacio F. Iquino; Juan Lladó
- Produced by: Ignacio F. Iquino
- Cinematography: Pablo Ripoll
- Edited by: Ramon Quadreny
- Music by: José Casas Augé
- Production company: IFI Producción
- Distributed by: IFISA
- Release date: 13 September 1954
- Running time: 96 minutes
- Country: Spain
- Language: Spanish

The Louts (Spanish:Los gamberros) is a 1954 Spanish comedy film directed by Juan Lladó.

== Cast ==
- Barta Barri
- Modesto Cid
- Jesús Colomer
- Carmen de Colomer
- Miguel Gila
- Adela González
- Milagros Leal
- José Marco
- Mariam
- Diana Mayer
- Marion Mitchell
- César Ojinaga
- María Cristina Palau
- Eugenia Roca
- Rafael Romero Marchent
- José Sazatornil
- Aurora Tarrida
- Julián Ugarte
- Miguel Ángel Valdivieso
- Fernando Vallejo

== Bibliography ==
- Bentley, Bernard. A Companion to Spanish Cinema. Boydell & Brewer 2008.
