= Don Juan (1950 film) =

- Directed by: José Luis Sáenz de Heredia
- Written by: José Zorrilla (play); Tirso de Molina (play); Carlos Blanco; José Luis Sáenz de Heredia
- Produced by: Eduardo de la Fuente
- Starring: António Vilar; Annabella; María Rosa Salgado
- Cinematography: Alfredo Fraile
- Edited by: Julio Peña
- Music by: Manuel Parada
- Production company: Chapalo Films
- Distributed by: CIFESA
- Release date: 16 October 1950
- Running time: 124 minutes
- Country: Spain
- Language: Spanish

Don Juan is a 1950 Spanish romantic adventure film directed by José Luis Sáenz de Heredia and starring António Vilar, Annabella and María Rosa Salgado. It is based on the legend of Don Juan.

The film's sets were designed by the art director Georges Wakhévitch. It was shot at the Estudios Ballesteros in Madrid.

== Synopsis ==
Following the death of his father, Don Juan returns from Venice to his native Seville. He discovers that in order to receive his inheritance he has to marry a particular woman Doña Iñés.

== Cast ==
- António Vilar as Don Juan
- Annabella as Lady Ontiveras
- María Rosa Salgado as Doña Iñés de Ulloa
- Enrique Guitart as Don Luís Mejía
- José Ramón Giner as Chuti
- Santiago Rivero as Don Gonzalo de Ulloa
- Mario Berriatúa as Hernando
- Fernando Fernández de Córdoba as Don Félix Calderón
- Mary Lamar as Condesa de Guadix
- María Asquerino as Claudina
- Manolo Morán as Arturo
- Carlos Agostí as Gitano
- Honorina Fernández as Ama de Doña Inés
- Mercedes Castellanos as Isabella
- Jacinto San Emeterio as Octavio
- Nicolás D. Perchicot as Fray Cardenio
- Juan Vázquez as Butarelli
- Francisco Pierrá as Don Diego Tenorio
- Beni Deus as Capitán del barco
- Julia Lajos as Posadera

== Bibliography ==
- Wright, Sarah. Tales of Seduction: The Figure of Don Juan in Spanish Culture. I.B.Tauris, 2012.
