= Roberto Font =

Mexican actor

- Born: October 21, 1904; San Luis Potosi, Mexico
- Died: June 16, 1981 (aged 76); Madrid, Spain
- Other name: Roberto Font Donís
- Occupation: Actor
- Years active: 1936–1978 (film)

Roberto Font (October 21, 1904 – June 16, 1981) was a Mexican film actor who settled and worked in Spain.

== Early life ==
Roberto Font was born on October 21, 1904, in San Luis Potosi, Mexico. Little is known about his early life and upbringing.

== Career ==
Font began his acting career in Mexican cinema in the 1930s. He gained recognition for his performances and soon became a prominent figure in the industry. In 1936, he made his debut in film and continued to appear in numerous productions throughout the following decades. Font's talent and versatility allowed him to portray a wide range of characters, earning him praise from audiences and critics alike.

In 1940, Font decided to expand his career horizons and relocated to Spain. There, he found success in Spanish cinema and became a well-known actor in the country. He appeared in various Spanish films, collaborating with renowned directors and fellow actors.

Font's career spanned over four decades, with his last film credit dating back to 1978. Throughout his career, he showcased his acting prowess and left a lasting impact on both Mexican and Spanish cinema.

== Selected filmography ==
- A New Play (1946)
- The Party Goes On (1948)
- I'm Not Mata Hari (1949)
- Thirty Nine Love Letters (1950)
- A Thief Has Arrived (1950)
- Fog and Sun (1951)
- Las interesadas (1952)
- The Three Happy Friends (1952)
- Yankee Dudler (1973)

== Personal life ==
Despite his public persona, Font remained a private individual, and little is known about his personal life and relationships.

== Legacy ==
Roberto Font's contributions to Mexican and Spanish cinema are widely recognized and appreciated. He is remembered for his talent, dedication, and significant impact on the film industry.

== Bibliography ==
- Goble, Alan. The Complete Index to Literary Sources in Film. Walter de Gruyter, 1999.
