= Margarete Genske =

German actress (1918–1992)

- Born: 13 April 1918; Berlin, Brandenburg, German Empire
- Died: 1992 (aged 73–74)
- Occupation: Actress
- Years active: 1937-1955 (film)

Margarete Genske (1918–1992) was a German film actress.

== Selected filmography ==
- The Irresistible Man (1937)
- The Night of Decision (1938)
- We Danced Around the World (1939)
- A Wife for Three Days (1944)
- Four Women (1947)
- A Thief Has Arrived (1950)
- Barrier to the North (1950)
- The Cliff of Sin (1950)
- Plot on the Stage (1953)

== Bibliography ==
- Hans Michael Bock, Wiebke Annkatrin Mosel & Ingrun Spazier. Die Tobis 1928-1945.: Eine kommentierte Filmografie. 2013.
