= One Bullet Is Enough =

1954 film

- Directed by: Juan Lladó; Jean Sacha
- Written by: Joaquina Algars; Jacques Berland; Pierre Léaud; Jean Sacha; José Antonio de la Loma
- Produced by: Ignacio F. Iquino; Georges de La Grandière
- Starring: Georges Ulmer; Véra Norman; Jacques Castelot
- Cinematography: Marcel Weiss
- Edited by: Santiago Gómez; Ramon Quadreny; Paulette Robert
- Music by: Augusto Algueró; José Casas Augé
- Production companies: Edition et Diffusion Cinématographique; IFI Producción
- Distributed by: Ignacio Ferrés Iquino; L'Alliance Générale de Distribution Cinématographique
- Release date: 1954
- Running time: 95 minutes
- Countries: Spain; France
- Language: Spanish

One Bullet Is Enough (French: Une balle suffit, Spanish: La canción del penal) is a 1954 Spanish-French crime film directed by Juan Lladó and Jean Sacha and starring Georges Ulmer, Véra Norman and Jacques Castelot.

== Synopsis ==
After leaving the prison where they have served their sentence, some criminals plan a new robbery.

== Cast ==
- Georges Ulmer as Carmo
- Véra Norman as Florence Davis
- Jacques Castelot as Me Fidler
- André Valmy as Stauner
- Mercedes Barranco as Rita
- Barta Barri as Patorni
- Mario Bustos
- José María Cases
- Jesús Colomer
- Mercedes de la Aldea
- Gerardo Esteban
- Arsenio Freignac as Donny
- Salvador Garrido
- Manuel Gas as Blanco
- Ramón Hernández
- Luis Induni
- Juan Monfort
- César Ojinaga
- Rafael Romero Marchent

== Bibliography ==
- Magí Crusells. Directores de cine en Cataluña: de la A a la Z. Edicions Universitat Barcelona, 2009.
