= José María Castellví =

Spanish film director

Josep María Castellví Marimón (1900 in Barcelona – 1944 in Barcelona) was a Catalan film director. He made one of the first sound shorts, Cinópolis, in France in 1931.

== Filmography ==
- 1931 Cinópolis (France)
- 1932 Mercedes – notable as the first Spanish "talkie" musical film
- 1934 ¡Viva la vida! – Comedy with José Santpere, Rosita Ballesteros, Conchita Ballesteros, Consuelo Cuevas, and Alady (Carles Saldaña Beut)
- 1940 Romeo and Juliet
- 1942 Cuarenta y ocho horas
- 1943 El camino del amor
- 1944 El hombre que las enamora
