= A Thief Has Arrived (1940 film) =

- Directed by: Augusto Cesar Vatteone
- Produced by: Wenceslao Fernández Flórez (novel); Julio F. Escobar; Daniel Spósito; Augusto Cesar Vatteone
- Music by: Alejandro Gutiérrez del Barrio
- Release date: 1940
- Country: Argentina
- Language: Spanish

A Thief Has Arrived (Spanish:Ha entrado un ladrón) is a 1940 Argentine film of the Golden Age of Argentine cinema directed by Augusto Cesar Vatteone. It was based on a novel by Wenceslao Fernández Flórez. It was remade in 1950 as a Spanish film.

== Cast ==
- Ana Arneodo
- Nélida Bilbao
- Emperatriz Carvajal
- Vicente Forastieri
- Antonio Gandía
- Elisa Labardén
- Tito Lusiardo
- Domingo Márquez
- Julio Renato
- Leonor Rinaldi
- Carlos Rosingana
- Francisco Álvarez

== Bibliography ==
- Goble, Alan. The Complete Index to Literary Sources in Film. Walter de Gruyter, 1999.
