= The Vila Family =

- Directed by: Ignacio F. Iquino
- Written by: Juan Lladó; Ignacio F. Iquino
- Starring: José Isbert; Juan de Landa; Modesto Cid; Maruchi Fresno
- Cinematography: Pablo Ripoll
- Edited by: Ramon Quadreny
- Music by: José Casas Augé
- Production company: IFI Producción
- Distributed by: Mercurio Films
- Release date: 8 May 1950
- Running time: 70 minutes
- Country: Spain
- Language: Spanish

The Vila Family (Spanish:La familia Vila) is a 1950 Spanish comedy film directed by Ignacio F. Iquino and starring José Isbert, Juan de Landa and Modesto Cid.

== Cast ==
- Barta Barri
- Modesto Cid as Abuelo
- Jesús Colomer as Jaime
- Juan de Landa as Teófilo Torrens
- Silvia de Soto as Patrona
- María Victoria Durá as Engracia
- María Francés as Adela
- Maruchi Fresno as Carmen
- José Isbert as Señor Vila
- Lina Izquierdo as Nuri
- Liria Izquierdo as Izquierdo, Lina
- Fernando Nogueras as Jorge Alsua
- Juana Soler as Elvira
- Eugenio Testa as Don Cosme

== Bibliography ==
- Labanyi, Jo & Pavlović, Tatjana. A Companion to Spanish Cinema. John Wiley & Sons, 2012.
