= Osvaldo Genazzani =

Italian actor

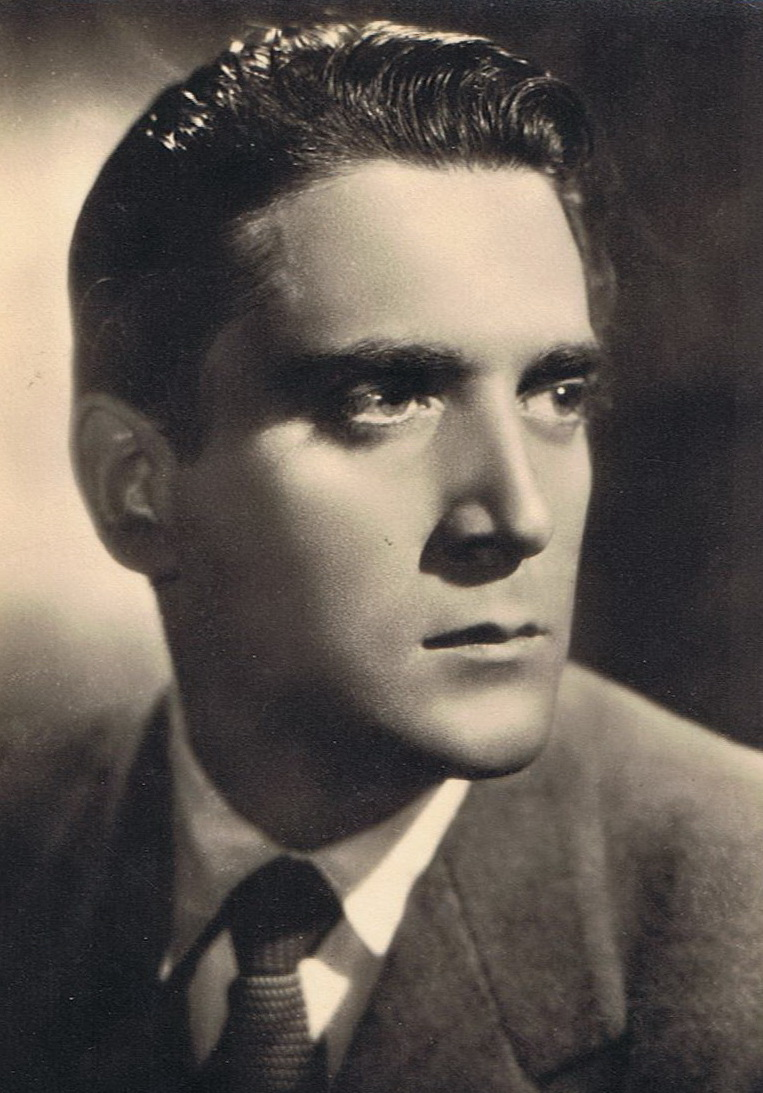
- Occupation: Actor
- Years active: 1926-1972 (film)

Osvaldo Genazzani was an Italian actor who appeared in more than forty films. He appeared alongside Amedeo Nazzari in the 1948 Spanish comedy Unexpected Conflict.

== Selected filmography ==
- The Last Days of Pompeii (1926)
- Boccaccio (1940)
- Saint John, the Beheaded (1940)
- Love Story (1942)
- Measure for Measure (1943)
- Two Hearts (1943)
- Unexpected Conflict (1948)
- Mare Nostrum (1948)
- The Butterfly That Flew Over the Sea (1948)
- That Luzmela Girl (1949)
- In a Corner of Spain (1949)
- Child of the Night (1950)
- 4 Dollars of Revenge (1966)
- Clint the Stranger (1967)
- The Boldest Job in the West (1969)
- Watch Out Gringo! Sabata Will Return (1972) as Mormon leader

== Bibliography ==
- Lancia, Enrico. Amedeo Nazzari. Gremese Editore, 1983.
