= Furrows (film) =

- Theatrical release poster
- Spanish: Surcos
- Directed by: José Antonio Nieves Conde
- Screenplay by: José Antonio Nieves Conde; Gonzalo Torrente Ballester; Natividad Zaro
- Story by: Eugenio Montes
- Starring: Luis Peña; María Asquerino
- Cinematography: Sebastián Perera
- Edited by: Margarita de Ochoa
- Music by: Jesús García Leoz
- Release date: 26 October 1951
- Running time: 99 minutes
- Country: Spain
- Language: Spanish

Furrows (Spanish: Surcos) is a 1951 Spanish film directed by José Antonio Nieves Conde, and written by him in collaboration with Gonzalo Torrente Ballester, Eugenio Montes, and Natividad Zaro. It provides an unsettling portrait of post-War Madrid while dictator Francisco Franco was in power. The plot follows the struggles of a Spanish family as it emigrates from the countryside to Madrid circa 1950. Facing difficulties in finding housing and employment, several family members turn to illegal or immoral activities in order to make ends meet, and the traditional family structure disintegrates.

== Plot ==
The plot begins when the Pérez family of country bumpkins arrive from the countryside at the Madrid train station, disoriented, gawking and loaded down with baggage, including a basket of live chickens. The Pérez family consists of a mother (who is never named in the movie), the fiftyish aged father, Manuel, his older son Pepe (who had visited Madrid during the Spanish Civil War), his younger son, Manolo and his slightly impish, but completely naïve daughter, Tonia.

They move in with a relative of the mother in a run down apartment complex that is overrun with hordes of children who do cruel things every time they get a chance, showing that none of them are attending school at that point in Franco's Spain. In the apartment they meet the relative's daughter, the street smart Pili. Pili makes a living for her mother and herself by selling contraband American cigarettes in the street. Pili has an evil boyfriend, El Mellao. El Mellao works for the even more evil black marketer, but well dressed, very rich and smooth, Don Roque ("El Chamberlain"). Pepe quickly makes an implacable enemy of El Mellao when he defends Pili from his abuses and Don Roque hires Pepe in the place of El Mellao to drive around his contraband, because Pepe will do it for less. Pepe and Pili also become a couple and move in together.

The father, Manuel tries selling candy in the street for his sister in law, but fails when the multitude of street children demand that he give it to them for free. Then a police officer takes away his entire supply because he is selling without a license. His sister in law is so enraged that she makes a very proud Manuel do kitchen work. Then, to Manuel's surprise, a note arrives that he has gotten a job in a foundry. However, when he attempts to work in the arduous conditions, he is quickly overcome by the noise and heat of the foundry and faints, losing the job almost immediately. His sister in law then again relegates him to humiliating kitchen work.

Pepe's job for Don Roque is to work with a gang that steals sacks of potatoes from trucks that are climbing a hill and then deliver those potatoes to Don Roque to sell on the black market. Tonia also meets Don Roque through Pepe and Pili, who immediately has designs on her. First, he hires Tonia as a maid for his mistress. Tonia is very impressed by all the fine clothing that Don Roque's mistress has. When Don Roque hears Tonia sing while working, he tells her she has talent and offers to pay for singing lessons for her. With her mother's reluctant consent, Tonia accepts enthusiastically. He buys her a lot of attractive clothing, supposedly so she will be well dressed for her performance as a singer. However, when she actually gets the chance to sing on stage, some ruffians, hired by Don Roque, disrupt her performance and make her look foolish. Tonia runs off the stage in tears. Then, Don Roque comforts Tonia and takes her away in his limousine to deflower her and make her his mistress. Manuel is totally shocked by the whole thing and slaps his wife around for letting it happen. Then, Manuel shows up unexpectedly at the door of the love nest, slaps a shocked Tonia hard and cries bitterly while she goes to get her things so he can take her away.

Pepe loses his job with Don Roque when he confronts him about deflowering his sister and demands that Don Roque marry her, which Don Roque laughs off with contempt. Pili still demands that he steal from trucks, but the rest of Don Roque's gang refuses to accompany him and El Mellao tips off the authorities that Pepe is about to try it without them. When Pepe hops into the back of the truck, they are waiting for him. They shoot him and he is further injured when he jumps off the truck. When he returns in the truck, badly injured, he finds El Mellao trying to drag away Pili as his prize. El Mellao then hits Pepe on the head with a large wrench and rushes off to chase a fleeing Pili. Don Roque arrives to find Pepe badly injured, but still alive. He takes him to a bridge and throws him onto railroad tracks as a train passes under the bridge.

In the last scene of the movie, Manuel, his wife, Manolo and Tonia have returned to their village where Pepe is being buried. Manuel picks up a handful of soil from the grave and tells his family that they have to return to the country. His wife says people will laugh, but Manuel replies that, even with shame, they have to return to the land.

== Cast ==
- Luis Peña as "El Mellao"
- María Asquerino as Pili
- Francisco Arenzana as Pepe
- Marisa de Leza as Toña
- Ricardo Lucía as Manolo Pérez
- José Prada as Manuel Pérez
- Montserrat Carulla as Rosario
- Félix Dafauce as Don Roque, "el Chamberlain"
- María Francés as la madre
- Carmen Sánchez la tía acogedora

== Background ==
Furrows is considered one of the very few Spanish neo-realist films from the era when the style was being created and popularized in Italy. The picture only escaped censorship because José María García Escudero, Spain's Chief of Cinematography, appreciated the value of the film for its artistic merit.

The film dealt with issues virtually unseen in Francoist Spain, including rural migration into the cities, poverty, prostitution, unemployment, and class conflicts. Furrows is a view of the contradictions found in Francoist Spain. The Catholic Church considered the film "deeply dangerous," yet political observers labeled the drama of "national interest." The film was not released until its controversial ending was removed.

== Awards ==
Wins

- Cinema Writers Circle Awards: CEC Award; Best Film; Best Supporting Actor, Félix Dafauce; Best Supporting Actress, Marisa de Leza; 1953.
- National Syndicate of Spectacle, Spain: 3rd place Prize of the National Syndicate of Spectacle; 1953.

Nominations

- 1952 Cannes Film Festival: Grand Prize of the Festival; José Antonio Nieves Conde; 1952.
