= Apartado de correos 1001 =

- Film poster
- Directed by: Julio Salvador
- Written by: Julio Coll (also story); Antonio Isasi-Isasmendi (also story)
- Starring: Tomás Blanco, Modesto Cid
- Cinematography: Federico G. Larraya
- Edited by: Antonio Isasi-Isasmendi
- Music by: Ramón Ferrés
- Distributed by: Emisora Films; Hispano Foxfilms S.A.E.
- Release date: 5 December 1950
- Country: Spain
- Language: Spanish

Apartado de correos 1001 is a 1950 Spanish crime film directed by Julio Salvador.

== Plot ==
Young Rafael was murdered in the street in front of the Police Headquarters in Barcelona. Miguel and Marcial, two agents of the Criminal Brigade in charge of the investigation, are, in the room of the deceased, a copy of "La Vanguardia", in which they are appointed an ad asking for a manager for a chemical company, by payment of a strong bond, and the indication for more information write to PO Box 1001. This unique track leading to the arrest of the murderer.

== Production ==
Initially, the film was going to be directed by Antonio Román, with Julio Salvador as assistant director. Finally, Román went on to direct another film from the same production company, The past threatens, and thus Salvador was the director of Post office box 1001.

The film is loosely based on real events: behind an ambiguous job offer published in an advertisement for La Vanguardia, a plot was hidden to defraud the unwary who responded to said offer. According to the policeman Gil Llamas, the work of the scriptwriters "was limited to handling the known data, seasoning them with the inevitable love story and with a certain murder perpetrated in front of the Superior Police Headquarters."

The film opens with a chain of images of Barcelona and a voiceover from the narrator, whose text is quoted below, expressing the authors' intention of realism and giving the film an air of semidocumentary.

== Cast ==
- Tomás Blanco
- Modesto Cid
- Manuel de Juan
- Elena Espejo
- Emilio Fábregas
- Ricardo Fuentes
- José Goula
- Marta Grau
- Casimiro Hurtado
- Guillermo Marín
- Carlos Muñoz
- Luis Pérez de León
- Conrado San Martín
- Eugenio Testa
