= Child of the Night (1950 film) =

- Directed by: Ricardo Gascón
- Written by: José Francés (novel); Antonio Abad Ojuel; Ricardo Gascón
- Starring: Osvaldo Genazzani; María Rosa Salgado; José Suarez; Enrique Guitart
- Cinematography: Enzo Serafin
- Edited by: Juan Palleja
- Music by: Juan Durán Alemany
- Production company: PECSA Films
- Distributed by: PECSA Films
- Release date: 21 July 1950
- Running time: 93 minutes
- Country: Spain
- Language: Spanish

Child of the Night (Spanish:El hijo de la noche) is a 1950 Spanish drama film directed by Ricardo Gascón and starring Osvaldo Genazzani, María Rosa Salgado and José Suárez.

== Cast ==
- Osvaldo Genazzani as Lauro
- María Rosa Salgado as Marion Brown
- José Suárez as Darío
- Enrique Guitart as Martín
- Félix de Pomés as Jean Barrière
- Elva de Bethancourt as Ernestina
- María Severini as Alicia Brown
- Consuelo de Nieva as Josefina
- Joe La Roe as Santiago
- Luis Villasiul as Oculista
- Pedro Mascaró as Administrador
- Modesto Cid as Juez

== Bibliography ==
- de España, Rafael. Directory of Spanish and Portuguese film-makers and films. Greenwood Press, 1994.
