= Cremilda de Oliveira =

Portuguese actress

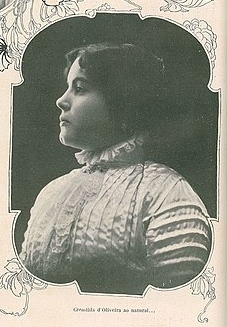

Cremilda de Oliveira (6 November 1887 - 23 June 1979) was a Portuguese actress. She played the role of Hanna in the Portuguese version of The Merry Widow, presented by the Portuguese, Lisbon-based company Galhardo; Armando de Vasconcelos played opposite her as Danilo.

Her filmography includes: A Viúva Alegre (1909); Es peligroso asomarse al exterior (1946); O Leão da Estrela (1947); O Grande Elias (1950); A Garça e a Serpente (1952); and O Comissário de Polícia (1953).
