= Juan Lladó =

- Born: 1918; Barcelona, Catalonia, Spain
- Died: 1956 (aged 37–38); Barcelona, Catalonia, Spain
- Other name: Juan Lladó Bausili
- Occupations: Writer, Director
- Years active: 1946–1956 (film)

Juan Lladó (1918–1956) was a Spanish screenwriter and film director.

== Selected filmography ==
- The Drummer of Bruch (1948)
- In a Corner of Spain (1949)
- The Vila Family (1950)
- Criminal Brigade (1950)
- Persecution in Madrid (1952)
- The Dance of the Heart (1953)
- One Bullet Is Enough (1954)
- The Louts (1954)

== Bibliography ==
- Bentley, Bernard. A Companion to Spanish Cinema. Boydell & Brewer 2008.
