= A Thief Has Arrived (1950 film) =

- Directed by: Ricardo Gascón
- Written by: Manuel Bengoa; Wenceslao Fernández Flórez (novel); Ricardo Gascón
- Starring: Roberto Font; Margarete Genske
- Cinematography: Federico G. Larraya; Enzo Serafin
- Music by: Juan Durán Alemany
- Production company: Titán Films
- Distributed by: Warner Brothers
- Release date: 6 March 1950
- Running time: 99 minutes
- Country: Spain
- Language: Spanish

A Thief Has Arrived (Spanish: Ha entrado un ladrón) is a 1950 Spanish film directed by Ricardo Gascón and starring Roberto Font and Margarete Genske. It is based on a novel by Wenceslao Fernández Flórez, which had previously been turned into a 1940 film in Argentina. The film was distributed by the Spanish branch of Warner Brothers.

It is based on the homonymous novel by the Spanish writer Wenceslao Fernández Flórez published in 1920.

== Synopsis ==
Jacinto is an ordinary and faint-hearted man who is in love with the beautiful Natalia. Due to a misunderstanding, he becomes a brave and daring hero for her. From then on, Jacinto will be forced to be consistent with the false image that has made Natalia change her mind.

== Cast ==
In alphabetical order

- Antonio Bofarull
- Pablo Bofill
- Arturo Cámara
- Félix de Pomés
- María Victoria Durá
- Roberto Font
- Margarete Genske
- Juana Soler

== Bibliography ==
- de España, Rafael. Directory of Spanish and Portuguese film-makers and films. Greenwood Press, 1994.
