= Criminal Brigade (1950 film) =

- Directed by: Ignacio F. Iquino
- Written by: Manuel Bengoa; Juan Lladó; José Santugini
- Produced by: Ignacio F. Iquino
- Starring: José Suarez; Soledad Lence; Alfonso Estela
- Cinematography: Pablo Ripoll
- Edited by: Ramon Quadreny
- Music by: Augusto Algueró
- Production company: Producciones Iquino
- Distributed by: Radio Films
- Release date: 4 December 1950
- Running time: 80 minutes
- Country: Spain
- Language: Spanish

Criminal Brigade (Spanish:Brigada criminal) is a 1950 Spanish crime film directed by Ignacio F. Iquino and starring José Suárez, Soledad Lence and Alfonso Estela. It is a film noir with extensive location shooting in Madrid.

== Plot ==
Fernando Olmos, a recently graduated police officer, witnesses a bank robbery, although he cannot do anything to prevent it. His first job is to infiltrate a garage as a car washer to catch a thief, unaware that the owner of the establishment is also the head of the robbery gang.

The film ends with a shocking sequence: the fight against the robbers in an under-construction building, the Francisco Franco Health Residence, now the Valle de Hebrón Hospital in Barcelona.

== Cast ==
- José Suarez as Fernando Olmos Sánchez
- Soledad Lence as Celia Albéniz
- Alfonso Estela as Óscar Román
- Manuel Gas as Inspector Basilio Lérida
- Barta Barri as Mario
- Pedro Córdoba de Córdoba
- Fernando Vallejo
- Antonio S. Amaya as Eduardo
- José Manuel Pinillos
- Tomy Castels
- Carlos Ronda as Correo
- Matías Ferret
- José Soler
- Maruchi Fresno
- Isabel de Castro
- Carlos Otero
- Mercedes Mozart

== Bibliography ==
- Bentley, Bernard. A Companion to Spanish Cinema. Boydell & Brewer 2008.
