= Ricardo Gascón =

Spanish screenwriter and film director (1910–1988)

- Born: 10 March 1910; Barcelona, Catalonia; Spain
- Died: 1988 (aged 77–78); Barcelona, Catalonia; Spain
- Other name: Ricardo Gascón Ferré
- Occupations: Screenwriter, Director
- Years active: 1936-1981 (film)

Ricardo Gascón (1910–1988) was a Spanish screenwriter and film director. A Catalan, Gascón generally worked at the Orphea Studios in Barcelona. He directed fourteen films during his career.

== Selected filmography ==
=== Director ===
- Gentleman Thief (1946)
- When the Angels Sleep (1947)
- That Luzmela Girl (1949)
- Unexpected Conflict (1948)
- A Thief Has Arrived (1950)
- Child of the Night (1950)
- The King's Mail (1951)
- Misión extravagante (1954)

== Bibliography ==
- de España, Rafael. Directory of Spanish and Portuguese film-makers and films. Greenwood Press, 1994.
