= María Rosa Salgado =

Spanish actress (1929–1995)

- Born: 20 April 1929; Madrid, Spain
- Died: 11 March 1995 (aged 65); Madrid, Spain
- Other name: María Rosa Jiménez Juan-José
- Occupation: Actress
- Years active: 1949-1978 (film)

María Rosa Salgado (1929–1995) was a Spanish actress. She appeared in around twenty films including It Happened in Broad Daylight. In the early 1950s she moved to Hollywood for her launch as an international star. After the failure of the initiative she returned to Spain and retired form acting in 1960, after her marriage to bullfighter Pepe Dominguín. She briefly returned to film and theatre after their separation, including performances in roles for directors such as Jorge Grau ("Chica de club"), Manuel Gutiérrez Aragón ("Sonámbulos") and Jaime Chávarri ("A un dios desconocido").

== Filmography ==
Year	Title	Role	Notes
1949	The Captain from Loyola	Infanta Catalina	
1949	Peace	Novia de Raúl	
1950	That Luzmela Girl		
1950	Child of the Night	Mania	
1950	Don Juan	Doña Iñés de Ulloa	
1950	Saturday Night	Donina	
1951	Reckless	Mayte Mendoza	
1951	El Negro que tenía el alma blanca	Emma Cortadel	
1951	Our Lady of Fatima	Helena	
1951	The Seventh Page	Isabel	
1958	Historias de la feria	Susette	
1958	El inquilino	Marta	
1958	Rapsodia de sangre	Lenina Kondor - Maria	
1958	It Happened in Broad Daylight	Frau Heller	
1960	María, matrícula de Bilbao	Amparo	
1970	Chicas de club	Madrina	
1972	Fuenteovejuna	Los Reyes Católicos	
1977	A un dios desconocido	Adela	
1978	Carne apaleada	Funcionaria prisión	
1978	Sonámbulos	María Rosa Gala	(final film role)

== Bibliography ==
- Hortelano, Lorenzo J. Torres. Directory of World Cinema: Spain. Intellect Books, 2011.
