= José Suárez (actor) =

Spanish actor (1919–1981)

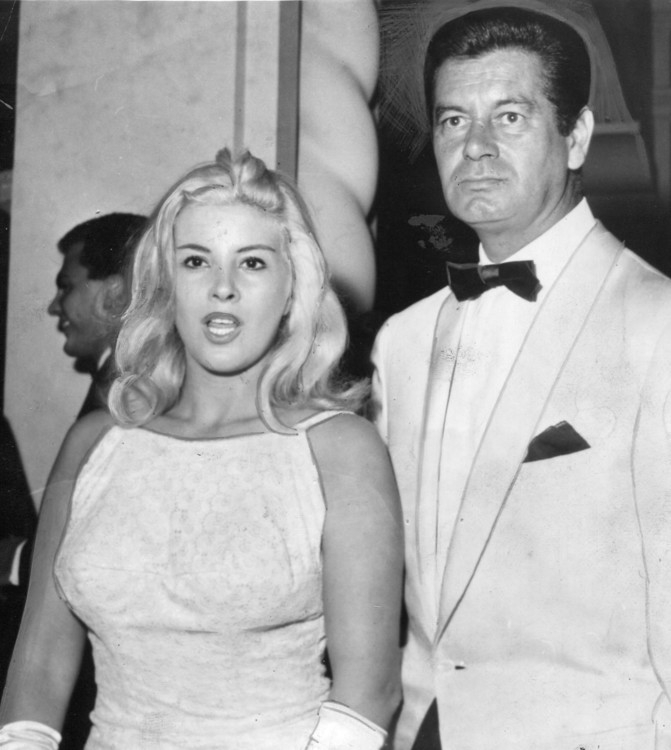
- Libertad Leblanc and Suárez.
- Born: José Suárez Sánchez; 19 September 1919; Trubia, Asturias, Spain
- Died: 6 August 1981 (aged 61); Moreda, Aller, Asturias, Spain
- Years active: 1944–1977

José Suárez (19 September 1919 – 6 August 1981) was a Spanish film actor.

== Career ==
José Suárez made his debut in a short role in Altar Mayor (1944), a very conventional film, whose director, Gonzalo Delgrás, had paid attention to him in his work as a train conductor in Asturias. He played increasingly important roles in the following films of Delgrás, and by 1948 he was already a lead actor.

He then became very popular in Spain along the late 1940s and the early 1950s, as one of the main heartthrobs of the Spanish cinema, along with his contemporaries Francisco Rabal, Jorge Mistral and Alfredo Mayo. Nevertheless, he performed remarkably in three outstanding dramas, namely Brigada criminal (1950), Condenados (1953) and Así es Madrid (1953), in the screen version of Buero Vallejo`s most famous play, Historia de una escalera (1950), and in the historical superproduction (for Spanish standards) Alba de América (Dawn of America, 1951), playing King Fernando el Católico. He portrayed Zorro in the film La montaña sin ley (Lawless mountain) (1953), making him the first Spanish actor in the role. He also co-starred with the popular Andalusian gipsy singer and dancer Lola Flores in La danza de los deseos (1954), directed by the most prestigious veteran Spanish film-maker, Florián Rey. In 1955 he co-starred Señora Ama with the Mexican and Hollywood star Dolores del Río.

In 1956, his lead role in the internationally acclaimed Calle Mayor (undoubtedly his best role, his best performance and his best film, although he always preferred Condenados) provided him with the opportunity to work in Italy with well-known film directors as Luigi Zampa in The Magistrate, starring with Claudia Cardinale, and Francesco Rosi in La sfida, starring with Rosanna Schiaffino, while he gradually lost his popularity in his home country, despite still appearing in the 60s in some interesting Spanish movies, such as A tiro limpio (1963) or La boda (1964).

José Suárez in the Spaghetti-western Texas, addio (1966).

Despite appearing too in two successful mainstream Italian films: Scano Boa (1961) and Sette uomini d'oro (1965), eventually he was almost confined to the Spanish-Italian sword and sandal and spaghetti westerns movies, the most interesting of all them being The Price of Power (1969), also known as Il Prezzo del potere or La Muerte de un Presidente. And he even played the lead in El Llanero (1964), one of the first films directed by the (in)famous master of the sexually charged horror films, Jesús Franco.

In the 70's he played too for the National Spanish television in a few series, including a Spanish-Italian coproduction on the life of Cristóbal Colón.

His last film was La trastienda (1975), an artistically dispensable but sociologically significant Spanish picture, coincident with the end of Franco era in Spain.

Suárez was for many years president of the Spanish Actors Union.

A tiro limpio poster (1963)

He died of natural causes on August 6, 1981, in Moreda, Asturias.

== Selected filmography ==
- 1944: Altar mayor - José
- 1947: Gold and Ivory - Manolo
- 1947: Trece onzas de oro
- 1948: Un viaje de novios
- 1948: La muralla feliz - David Aguirre
- 1950: La niña de Luzmela
- 1950: Child of the Night - Darío
- 1950: Historia de una escalera - Fernando
- 1950: Nobody's Wife - Juan Bautista Nebot
- 1950: Criminal Brigade - Fernando Olmos Sánchez
- 1951: Dawn of America - Rey Fernando el Católico
- 1952: Spanish Serenade - Pablo
- 1953: Aquel hombre de Tánger
- 1953: Bronce y luna
- 1953: La montaña sin ley - Zorro
- 1953: Such is Madrid - Antonio
- 1953: Condenados - Juan
- 1954: An Impossible Crime - Inspector Alberto Bassano
- 1954: Eleven Pairs of Boots - Ignacio Ariza
- 1954: La Danza de los deseos - Juan Antonio
- 1955: Señora Ama - Feliciano
- 1955: El hombre que veía la muerte
- 1955: Tres melodías de amor
- 1956: Calle mayor - Juan
- 1957: The Battalion in the Shadows - Pepe
- 1957: Le belle dell'aria - Mario Toselli
- 1958: The Italians They Are Crazy - Pieroni
- 1958: La sfida - Vito Polara
- 1959: Diego Corrientes - Diego Corrientes
- 1959: Il magistrato - Prosecutor Andrea Morandi
- 1960: Cartagine in fiamme - Hiram
- 1960: Un bruto para Patricia - Andrés Fernández
- 1961: Scano Boa - Baroncello
- 1963: Slave Girls of Sheba - Omar
- 1963: El globo azul
- 1963: El llanero - José Mendoza
- 1964: A tiro limpio - Román Avelino Campos
- 1964: La Boda
- 1964: Rueda de sospechosos - Comisario Luis Lozano
- 1965: Sette uomini d'oro - Bank Manager
- 1966: Agent X-77 Orders to Kill - Franck
- 1966: Texas, Adios - Cisco Delgado
- 1967: El Primer cuartel - Capitan Fernando Martín del castillo
- 1967: Mister Dynamit - morgen küßt Euch der Tod - General Burch
- 1968: Maria Isabel - Ricardo Robles
- 1969: Bootleggers - Engineer
- 1969: El taxi de los conflictos - Guardia en puerta de comisaría
- 1969: Il Pistolero dell'Ave Maria - General Juan Carrasco
- 1969: La muerte de un presidente - Vice President Chester A. Arthur
- 1970: Cateto a babor - Comandante
- 1970: El amor de María Isabel - Ricardo Robles
- 1970: El mejor del mundo - Paco Vélez
- 1971: El Cristo del Océano - Don Eustaquio
- 1971: Los jóvenes amantes
- 1971: La Montaña rebelde - Damasio
- 1972: María
- 1972: Marianela - Dr. Golfín
- 1972: A Reason to Live, a Reason to Die - maggiore Charles Ballard
- 1974: Los Caballeros del Botón de Ancla - Director de la escuela naval
- 1975: La Trastienda - Don Pablo

== See also ==
- Cinema of Spain

== Bibliography ==
- Torres, Augusto M. (1994). Diccionario del cine español. Madrid: Espasa-Calpe. ISBN 84-239-9203-9.
