= Modesto Cid =

Spanish actor

- Born: 25 March 1879; Ourense, Spain
- Died: 5 July 1954 (aged 75); Barcelona, Spain
- Occupation: Actor
- Years active: 1933–1954

Modesto Cid (25 March 1879 – 5 July 1954) was a Spanish film actor. He appeared in 67 films between 1933 and 1954.

== Selected filmography ==
- The Wildcat (1936)
- Gentleman Thief (1946)
- When the Angels Sleep (1947)
- Unexpected Conflict (1948)
- The Drummer of Bruch (1948)
- His Heart Awake (1949)
- That Luzmela Girl (1949)
- Apartado de correos 1001 (1950)
- The Honesty of the Lock (1950)
- The Vila Family (1950)
- Child of the Night (1950)
- My Beloved Juan (1950)
- Nobody's Wife (1950)
- Fog and Sun (1951)
- Doubt (1951)
- I Want to Marry You (1951)
- The King's Mail (1951)
- La Virgen gitana (1951)
- María Morena (1951)
- Forbidden Trade (1952)
- Spanish Fantasy (1953)
- The Louts (1954)
- Father Cigarette (1955)
