= List of Spanish films of 1952 =

A list of films produced in Spain in 1952 (see 1952 in film).

== 1952 ==
Title	Director	Cast	Genre	Notes
1952
Amaya	Luis Marquina	Susana Canales, Julio Peña, José Bódalo	Historical	
Come Die My Love	Luis Marquina	Honor Blackman, Gérard Tichy, José Bódalo	Drama	Co-production with the United Kingdom
Doña Francisquita	Ladislao Vajda	Mirtha Legrand, Armando Calvo, Antonio Casal	Musical	
Estrella of the Sierra Morena	Ramón Torrado	Lola Flores, Rubén Rojo, José Nieto	Drama	
The Eyes Leave a Trace	José Luis Sáenz de Heredia	Raf Vallone, Elena Varzi, Julio Peña, Emma Penella	Film Noir	Co-production with Italy
Feather in the Wind	Louis Cuny, Ramón Torrado	Georges Guétary, Carmen Sevilla, Jacqueline Pierreux	Musical	Co-production with France
Flamenco	Edgar Neville	Conchita Montes	Documentary	About Flamenco. Entered into the 1953 Cannes Film Festival.
The Floor Burns	Luis Marquina	Annabella, Tomás Blanco, Gérard Tichy	Drama	
From Madrid to Heaven	Rafael Gil	Gustavo Rojo, Manolo Morán, Félix Fernández	Musical	
Gloria Mairena	Luis Lucia	Juanita Reina, Eduardo Fajardo, Rafael Arcos	Drama	
Imperial Violets	Richard Pottier	Luis Mariano, Carmen Sevilla, Simone Valère	Musical	Co-production with France
Lola the Coalgirl	Luis Lucia	Juanita Reina, Virgílio Teixeira, Manuel Luna	Historical	
El Judas	Ignacio F. Iquino	António Vilar, Manuel Gas	Religion drama	Spanish Neorealism. Recorded both in Catalán and Spanish, the Catalán version was banned by Franco because of language politics in Spain under Franco
The Pelegrín System	Ignacio F. Iquino	Fernando Fernán Gómez, Isabel de Castro	Sports comedy	
Persecution in Madrid	Enrique Gómez		Crime	
Sister San Sulpicio	Luis Lucia	Carmen Sevilla, Jorge Mistral, Julia Caba Alba	Comedy	
Spanish Serenade	Ladislao Vajda	José Suárez, Manolo Morán, José Isbert	Musical	
The Song of Sister Maria	Rafael Gil	Dominique Blanchar, Francisco Rabal, Julia Caba Alba	Drama	
