= Mariona Rebull =

Mariona Rebull may refer to:

- Mariona Rebull (novel), a 1943 Spanish novel
- Mariona Rebull (film), a 1947 Spain film
