= Corner in Madrid =

Corner of Madrid
- Directed by: León Artola
- Written by: León Artola
- Cinematography: William H. Clothier
- Music by: Pedro Braña
- Production company: Diana Exclusivas
- Release date: 1936
- Country: Spain
- Language: Spanish

Corner of Madrid (Spanish:Rinconcito madrileño) is a 1936 Spanish drama film directed by León Artola. The film was made at the Estudios Roptence in Madrid.

== Cast ==
- Pilar Cantero
- María Cañete
- Guadalupe Garcí-Nuño
- Ana de Leyva
- Luis Prendes
- Cecilio Rodríguez de la Vega
- Trini Tejada
- Pepita C. Velázquez

== Bibliography ==
- Labanyi, Jo & Pavlović, Tatjana. A Companion to Spanish Cinema. John Wiley & Sons, 2012.
