= A Tale of Two Villages =

1951 film

- Directed by: Antonio del Amo
- Written by: Adolfo Torrado; Antonio del Amo
- Starring: Nani Fernández; Carlos Muñoz; Manolo Morán
- Cinematography: Cecilio Paniagua
- Music by: Jesús García Leoz
- Production company: Roptence P.C.
- Distributed by: Samsa Film
- Release date: 8 September 1951
- Running time: 78 minutes
- Country: Spain
- Language: Spanish

A Tale of Two Villages (Spanish: Historia en dos aldeas) is a 1951 Spanish drama film directed by Antonio del Amo and starring Nani Fernández, Carlos Muñoz and Manolo Morán.

== Cast ==
- Manuel Arbó
- Xan das Bolas
- José Bódalo
- Nani Fernández
- Juana Mansó
- Arturo Marín
- Manolo Morán
- Carlos Muñoz
- Manuel Requena
- Lina Rosales
- Porfiria Sanchíz

== Bibliography ==
- de España, Rafael. Directory of Spanish and Portuguese film-makers and films. Greenwood Press, 1994.
