= Carlos Muñoz (actor) =

Spanish actor

- Born: 3 April 1919; Vigo, Spain
- Died: 15 April 2005 (aged 86); Madrid, Spain
- Occupation: Actor
- Years active: 1939-1991

Carlos Muñoz Arosa (3 April 1919 – 15 April 2005) was a Spanish actor. He appeared in more than one hundred films from 1939 to 1991.

== Selected filmography ==
Year	Title	Role	Notes
1940	The Siege of the Alcazar		
1940	The Unloved Woman		
1940	Marianela		
1943	Cristina Guzmán		
1943	Fantastic Night		
1943	The Scandal		
1944	Lola Montes		
1945	Last Stand in the Philippines		
1947	Four Women		
1947	Mariona Rebull		
1948	Guest of Darkness		
1949	Wings of Youth		
1949	Troubled Lives		
1949	Ninety Minutes		
1950	Apartado de correos 1001		
1951	A Tale of Two Villages		
1951	Fog and Sun		
1973	...All the Way, Boys!		
1973	Juan Moreira		
1974	La Madre María		
1978	Black Angel		
1984	Camila		
