= Heroes del Aire =

- Theatrical film poster
- Directed by: Ramón Torrado
- Screenplay by: H.S. Valdés
- Produced by: Arturo González
- Starring: Alfredo Mayo; Lina Rosales; Maria Piazzai; Julio Núñez
- Cinematography: Ricardo Torres
- Music by: Emilio Lehmberg
- Production company: Seuvia Films-Gonzalez
- Distributed by: Arturo González Producciones Cinematográficas
- Release date: May 19, 1958
- Running time: 92 or 96 minutes
- Country: Spain
- Language: Spanish

Heroes del Aire (aka Air Heroes, Aguilas de Paz, Heroes of the Sky and Hèreos del Air) is a 1958 Spanish war film directed by Ramón Torrado and written by H.S. Valdés and stars Alfredo Mayo, Lina Rosales, Maria Piazzai and Julio Núñez. The film was released on May 19, 1958, by Arturo González Producciones Cinematográficas. During the postwar years, only 21 Spanish films depicted the combat of the Spanish Civil War, with Heroes del Aire treating the subject obliquely in a series of flashbacks.

== Plot ==
Coronel Rivas (Alfredo Mayo) was a daring pilot in the Spanish Civil War. He marries the sister (Lina Rosales) of a friend (Julio Núñez) in an air force unit. Both had flown for the Nationalist side. During the war, Rivas had stolen a Republican aircraft, but was shot down by his friend.

After surviving the attack, in the 1950s, Rivas eventually becomes the commander of a search and rescue service. When an aircraft from his air rescue squadron crashes during landing, an investigation begins. Complications from a blackmail attempt threaten to involve more than just the commander. In the end, the fear of being exposed for his role in the scandal that could destroy his entire family, leads Rivas to rescue terrified passengers aboard a doomed airliner.

== Cast ==
- Alfredo Mayo as Coronel (en: Colonel) Rivas
- Lina Rosales as wife of Coronel Rivas
- Maria Piazzai as Herminia
- Julio Núñez as Civil War flyer
- Jose Marco as pilot
- Thomas Bianco as Ernesto
- Javier Armet as pilot
- Francisco Bernal as Aznar
- Mario Berriatúa as Guzman
- José Calvo as Capitán
- Xan das Bolas as Percebe
- Carlos Casaravilla as Ibáñez
- Antonio Casas as Asesor
- Ángel Córdoba as Teniente
- Félix Dafauce as Médico
- Rafael de la Rosa as Soldado
- Francisco Montalvo as Morales
- Antonio Riquelme as Andaluz
- Rufino Inglés as Comandante
- Julio Goróstegui as General
- José Sepúlveda as Comandante Rojo
- Vicente Ávila as Capitán

== Production ==
Heroes del Aire was shot primarily at Barajas Airport in Barajas, Spain, and in Madrid in 1957. The film was one of the few military-themed productions that came out of the General Franco era. (Note: Alfredo Mayo flew for the Nationalists in the Spanish Civil War.)

== Reception ==
Heroes del Aire' was not well received by critics. Reviewer Hal Erickson noted "Though nothing special, 'Heroes del Aire' was deemed worthy of entry in the 1957 San Sebastián Film Festival." He also observed, "Though Alfredo Mayo is the real star of 'Heroes del Aire', top billing goes to leading lady Lina Rosales."
