= Olga Ramos =

- Born: Trinidad Olga Ramos Sanguino; 18 July 1918; Badajoz, Spain
- Died: 25 August 2005 (aged 87); Boadilla del Monte, Spain
- Resting place: Cementerio de la Almudena
- Occupations: Singer, actress
- Spouse: Enrique Martínez de Gamboa
- Children: Olga María Ramos
- Musical career
- Genres: Cuplé
- Instruments: Voice, violin

Trinidad Olga Ramos Sanguino (18 July 1918 – 25 August 2005) was a Spanish cupletista, violinist, and actress known as the queen of the cuplé.

== Life and career ==
She appeared singing a song in the 1940 film Leyenda rota, with Juan de Orduña and Maruchi Fresno, directed by Carlos Fernández Cuenca.

She studied violin at the Madrid Royal Conservatory, where she won the first prize for chamber music in 1943.

In the 1940s, she conducted the Orquesta Fémina, an "orchestra of young ladies", in various locations in the city such as Café Universal.

After a few years withdrawn from the world of entertainment, from 1967 to 1978 she sang at the Madrid venue El Último Cuplé, at 51 Calle de la Palma, until its closure. Two years later, Ramos reopened the club, becoming an entrepreneur, with her daughter, Olga María Ramos, under the name Las Noches del Cuplé, and performed there daily until its final closure in 1999.

Her husband, Enrique Martínez de Gamboa, composed several of her songs.

== Discography ==
- Madrid entre cuplés y canciones
- Puro cuplé

== Awards and distinctions ==
- First prize for chamber music from the Madrid Royal Conservatory
- Madrid Medal for artistic merit
- Lady of the Order of Isabella the Catholic
- Gold medal for merit at work
- Gold medal of Agustín Lara
- Plaque at the Memory Plan of Madrid (Puerta del Sol)
- Garbanzo de Plata
- "Voz microfónica" of the Estudios Roptence in Madrid
- Medal of the Villa y Corte Foundation
- Community gold medal of the Canary Islands
- Cibeles Honor Award of the Madrid Forum
