= College Boarding House =

1959 film

- Directed by: Rafael Gil
- Written by: Alejandro Pérez Lugín (novel); Rafael García Serrano
- Starring: Ana Esmeralda; Arturo Fernández; Pepe Rubio
- Cinematography: Michel Kelber
- Edited by: Julio Peña
- Music by: Manuel Parada
- Production company: Coral Producciones Cinematográficas
- Release date: 19 October 1959
- Running time: 94 minutes
- Country: Spain
- Language: Spanish

College Boarding House (Spanish: La casa de la Troya) is a 1959 Spanish comedy film directed by Rafael Gil and starring Ana Esmeralda, Arturo Fernández and Pepe Rubio.

== Cast ==
- Ana Esmeralda as Carmiña Castro
- Arturo Fernández as Gerardo Roquer
- Pepe Rubio as Casimiro Barcala
- Julio Riscal as Madeira
- Rafael Bardem as Don Laureano
- Félix de Pomés as Don Juan
- Cándida Losada as Jacinta
- Félix Fernández as Don Ventura
- Erasmo Pascual as Don Angelito
- María Bassó as Tona
- María Isbert as Mensajera
- Enrique S. Guzmán as Augusto
- Raúl Cancio as Maroño
- María Granada as Filo
- Manuel Gil as Adolfo Pulleiro 'Panduriño'
- Elena Puerto as La Pachequito
- Mercedes Alonso as Moncha
- Ventura Oller as Samoeiro
- Ricardo Tundidor as Seminarista
- Guillermo Hidalgo as Octavio
- José Manuel Ramírez as Estudiante
- Emiliano Redondo as Estudiante
- José María Tasso as Mollido
- Eumedre as Criado del pazo
- Matilde Muñoz Sampedro as Monja 1ª
- Adela Calderón
- Luisa Hernán
- Manuel Arbó as Catedrático
- Pablo Muñiz
- Licia Calderón as Charito 'La Mañitas'
- Manolo Morán as Minguiños
- José Isbert as Don Servando

== Bibliography ==
- Bentley, Bernard. A Companion to Spanish Cinema. Boydell & Brewer 2008.
