= José Álvarez de Paz =

Spanish politician (1935–2021)

Member of the European Parliament for Spain
- In office January 1, 1986 – July 18, 1994

Member of the Congress of Deputies
- In office July 8, 1986 – June 23, 1987
- Constituency: León

Personal details
- Born: November 19, 1935 Noceda del Bierzo, Spanish Republic
- Died: February 16, 2021 (aged 85) Baiona, Spain
- Party: PSOE
- Occupation: Lawyer, politician

José Álvarez de Paz (19 November 1935 in Noceda del Bierzo, León, Spain – 16 February 2021 in Baiona, Pontevedra, Spain) was a Spanish labor lawyer and politician who served as a Deputy and MEP. He was one of the names that were on the blacklists to retaliate if the coup d'état of 1981 had triumphed.
