= León Artola =

Spanish screenwriter and film director

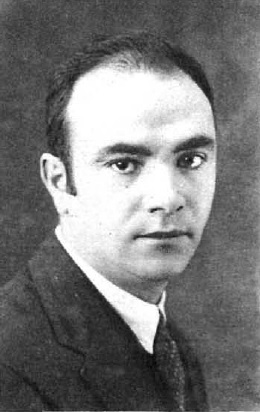
- Artola in 1927
- Born: 1893; Noceda del Bierzo, Spain
- Occupations: Director; Screenwriter
- Years active: 1926-1936 (film)

León Artola was a Spanish screenwriter and film director. His family emigrated to Argentina when he was young, but he later returned to Spain. Artola directed seven films including Corner in Madrid (1936).

== Selected filmography ==
- Mientras la aldea duerme (1926)
- El pollo pera (1926)
- La del Soto del Parral (1929)
- El suceso de anoche (1929)
- Sol en la nieve (1934)
- Rosario la cortijera (1935)
- Corner in Madrid (1936)

== Bibliography ==
- Labanyi, Jo & Pavlović, Tatjana. A Companion to Spanish Cinema. John Wiley & Sons, 2012.
