= Raza (film) =

1942 Spanish film by José Luis Sáenz de Heredia

- Film poster
- Directed by: José Luis Sáenz de Heredia
- Screenplay by: José Luis Sáenz de Heredia; Antonio Román
- Based on: Raza by Francisco Franco (Note: Under the pseudonym "Jaime de Andrade")
- Starring: Alfredo Mayo; Ana Mariscal; José Nieto; Blanca de Silos
- Cinematography: Heinrich Gärtner
- Edited by: Eduardo García Maroto; Bienvenida Sanz
- Music by: Manuel Parada
- Distributed by: Cancilleria del Consejo de la Hispanidad; Distribuidora Cinematográfica Ballesteros
- Release date: 1942
- Running time: 113 minutes
- Country: Spain
- Language: Spanish

Raza (English: Race) is a 1942 Spanish war film directed by José Luis Sáenz de Heredia, and used as propaganda by the dictatorship of Francisco Franco to support his regime and against the supporters of the deposed Second Spanish Republic. It is based on a semi-autobiographical novel by Franco himself under the pseudonym of "Jaime de Andrade."

The film won the Prize of the National Syndicate of Spectacle.

== Plot ==
The film tells the story of four siblings, Isabel, Pedro, Jose and Jaime, children of the ship captain Pedro Churruca and descendants of Cosme Damián Churruca, "the most wise and courageous sailor of his time." Their father, emulating his illustrious ancestor, dies at the beginning of the film in Cuba, which is still a Spanish colony, in a suicide mission against the United States Navy. Before leaving for martyrdom, however, Pedro was doing his best to convey to his children the inherent spirit in the family name, Churruca, which is the spirit of the Almogávares: "elected warriors, the best representatives of the Spanish race: firm fighters, agile and determined in manoeuvres."

Since his early childhood, Jose has displayed that Almogávar spirit. The same cannot be said for Pedro, in whom we see a constant lust for money and a tendency to lie and cheat. Isabel, for her part, is a model child. Jose goes, like his father, into a military career. Isabel marries a soldier. Pedro, unlike his brother, becomes a deputy Republican and requires his share of the family inheritance quickly, to cover the costs of his political career. The fourth child, Jaime – still a baby when his father died – joins a religious order as a priest.

Civil war breaks out. Isabel is with her husband in the Nationalist area. Pedro and Jose are in the embattled Republican Madrid. Pedro has risen to an important post, apparently in the Ministry of Defence. Jose is captured as a result of his activities as a fifth columnist and sentenced to death, a sentence that his brother, Pedro, worried about himself, does not intend to revoke. Jose was shot by a platoon of ill-spoken and unshaven militiamen, but, by some miracle, he survives. Moved, by a woman who loves him, to the clinic of a doctor who is in favour of Franco, his wounds heal and he acquires a new identity that will allow him to move around the area. Unfortunately, his brother, Friar Jaime, is captured by anarchist militiamen in Barcelona, a Republican area. He is shot dead, along with the other friars, by a mob of militiamen who attack and destroy the monastery. He has the opportunity to save himself by invoking the name of his brother, Pedro (who has been assigned to Barcelona), but true to his surname and his brothers in religion, refuses any privilege.

Jose gets into the Nationalist area, with the help of a dentist who had a "bad past" in leftism, "which gave him influence in that corrupt society." He comes to the Basque front, where he meets his brother-in-law, Captain Echevarría, who feels tempted to desert the Nationalists and cross the lines to meet his wife, Isabel Churruca and his two sons, who are trapped in Republican Bilbao. José avoids this, and soon resolves the situation with a happy ending: Nationalist troops defeat the International Brigades who defend the capital of Biscay, and the family meets.

On the northern front, Franco's army are preparing to attack near Aragon. In Barcelona, Pedro, now dressed in a uniform of the Republican army, is preparing the defence against imminent attack. Pedro confronts the prejudices of a man who has a bad appearance and worse manners, who argues that someone with the surname Churruca can not adequately serve the cause of the Republic. Pedro does not know it yet, but moments later prove that the militiaman was right: a woman visiting him, asks him to provide her with a copy of the status of forces on the front lines of Aragon to give to the nationalists. Pedro, shocked, says he cannot betray his own. The woman replies that "it is not possible to have the murderers of your family and many honorable families as your own". Touched by the argument, Pedro gives her the plans. However, the operation is discovered, to the pleasure of the head badly handled militiaman, and the plans do not reach the powers of the nationalists. Faced with death, Pedro seems to recover that Almogávar spirit that had not managed to penetrate him before. "Even without plans and without arms, the reds steadied themselves," and Franco's troops win the battle.

The film closes with the surviving Churruca family members attending the parade of victory in Madrid, chaired by Franco.

== Cast ==
- Alfredo Mayo as José Churruca
- Ana Mariscal as Marisol Mendoza
- José Nieto as Pedro Churruca
- Blanca de Silos as Isabel Churruca
- Rosina Mendía as Isabel Acuña de Churruca
- Pilar Soler as French spy
- Julio Rey de las Heras as Pedro Churruca's father
- Luis Arroyo as Jaime Churruca
- Raúl Cancio as Luis Echevarría
- Manuel Arbó as Señor Echevarría
- Juan Calvo as El Campesino
- Vicente Soler as Dr. Vera
- Fernando Fresno as Padre Palomeque
- Antonio Armet as Gen. Vicente Rojo
- Pablo Álvarez Rubio as French commander
- Fulgencio Nogueras as Adm. Cervera
- Domingo Rivas as Engineer Colonel
- Manuel Soto as Almirante de la base
- Pablo Hidalgo as Don Luis
- Ignacio Mateo as Col. Pardo
- Antonio Zaballos as Sacerdote
- Santiago Rivero as Engineer Captain
- Luis Latorre as Dr. Gómez Ulloa
- Horacio Socías as Padre prior
- Erasmo Pascual as Militiaman #1
- Joaquín Regúlez as Volunteer
- Raza Zarnad as Volunteer
