= Black Sky =

1951 film by Manuel Mur Oti

- Directed by: Manuel Mur Oti
- Written by: Antonio González Álvarez; Francisco Pierrá; Antonio Zozaya; Manuel Mur Oti
- Starring: Susana Canales; Fernando Rey; Luis Prendes
- Cinematography: Manuel Berenguer
- Edited by: Antonio Gimeno; Sara Ontañón
- Music by: Jesús García Leoz
- Production company: Intercontinental Films
- Distributed by: PROCINES
- Release date: 9 July 1951
- Running time: 98 minutes
- Country: Spain
- Language: Spanish

Black Sky (Spanish: Cielo negro) is a 1951 Spanish drama film directed by Manuel Mur Oti and starring Susana Canales, Fernando Rey and Luis Prendes. A woman working in a shop falls in love with a bohemian poet.

== Cast ==
- Susana Canales as Emilia
- Fernando Rey as Ángel López Veiga
- Luis Prendes as Ricardo Fortun
- Teresa Casal
- Inés Pérez Indarte
- Julia Caba Alba as Fermina
- Porfiria Sanchíz
- Mónica Pastrana
- Francisco Pierrá
- Rafael Bardem
- Manuel Arbó
- Ramón Martori
- Raúl Cancio
- Casimiro Hurtado as Pepe - camarero
- José Isbert
- Manolo Morán
- Nicolás D. Perchicot
- Antonio Riquelme as Churrero en la verbena
- Vicente Soler

== Bibliography ==
- Mira, Alberto. Historical Dictionary of Spanish Cinema. Scarecrow Press, 2010.
