= Manolo Morán =

Spanish actor (1905–1967)

Manolo Morán León
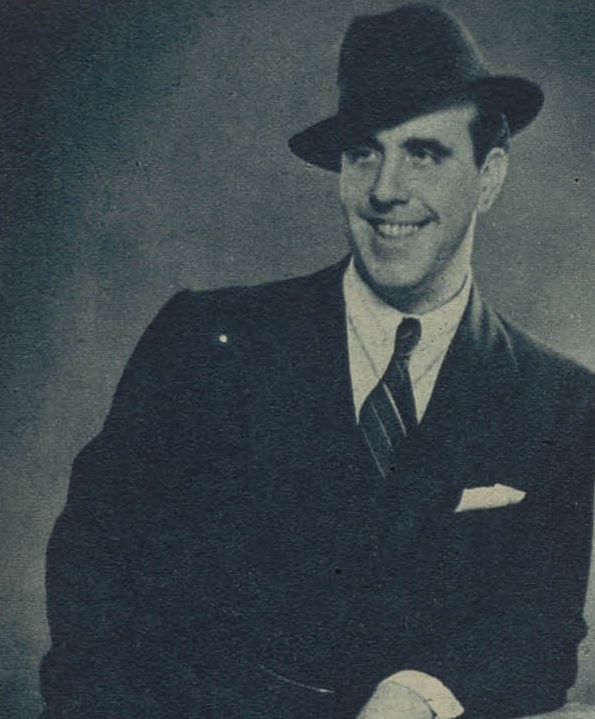
- Born: 30 December 1905; Madrid, Spain
- Died: 27 April 1967 (aged 61); San Juan de Alicante
- Occupation: Actor
- Years active: 1939- 1967

Manolo Morán (30 December 1905, in Madrid – 27 April 1967, in Alicante) was a Spanish film actor.

== Selected filmography ==
- Carmen fra i rossi (1939) - Il capitano Salmeron
- El huésped del sevillano (1940)
- The Unloved Woman (1940) - Pascual
- El crucero Baleares (1941) - Zafarrancho
- Madrid Carnival (1941, Short, by Edgar Neville)
- Escuadrilla (1941) - Director de la cárcel
- Sarasate (1941)
- Whirlwind (1941) - Juan Barea
- Boda en el infierno (1942) - Julián Suárez
- Goyescas (1942, by Benito Perojo) - Mesonero
- La famosa Luz María (1942, by Fernando Mignoni)
- Intrigue (1942) - Inspector Ferrer
- House of Cards (1943) - Paco
- El abanderado (1943, by Eusebio Fernández Ardavín) - Sargento Marchena
- A Palace for Sale (1943) - Señor Ventura
- Lessons in Good Love (1944) - Eugenio
- Yo no me caso (1944)
- Paraíso sin Eva (1944) - Don Jesús
- El testamento del virrey (1944) - Quintín
- El destino se disculpa (1945, by José Luis Sáenz de Heredia) - Rufino Quintana
- The Road to Babel (1945) - Brandolet
- Noche decisiva (1945) - Perucho
- Last Stand in the Philippines (1945, by Antonio Román) - Cabo Pedro Vila
- La mantilla de Beatriz (1946)
- The Emigrant (1946) - Josechu
- Por el gran premio (1947)
- Barrio (1947) - Detective Castro
- Don Quixote (1947) - Barber
- Extraño amanecer (1948)
- The Sunless Street (1948) - Manolo
- A Toast for Manolete (1948, by Florián Rey) - Antonio
- ¡Olé torero! (1949) - Pepito
- El hombre de mundo (1949)
- ¡Fuego! (1949) - Ramón
- Just Any Woman (1949) - Taxista
- Adventures of Juan Lucas (1949) - Chano
- A punta de látigo (1949)
- El duende y el rey (1950)
- Don Juan (1950) - Arturo
- Balarrasa (1950, by José Antonio Nieves Conde) - Desiderio
- I Want to Marry You (1951) - Roberto
- Black Sky (1951, by Manuel Mur Oti)
- A Tale of Two Villages (1951)
- Séptima página (1951) - Sereno
- Captain Poison (1951) - Marqués de Tomillares
- Spanish Serenade (1951) - Morgan
- From Madrid to Heaven (1952, by Rafael Gil) - Cayetano
- Persecution in Madrid (1952) - El Málaga
- Estrella of the Sierra Morena (1952) - Ladeao
- Amaya (1952) - Saturnino Aizcur
- Doña Francisquita (1952) - Lorenzo
- Hermano menor (1953)
- Welcome Mr. Marshall! (1953, by Luis García Berlanga) - Manolo
- The Devil Plays the Flute (1953, by José María Forqué) - Don Cosme
- Airport (1953) - Santiago Beltrán
- Such is Madrid (1953) - Julián
- Plot on the Stage (1953) - Paco
- Nuits andalouses (1954) - Don Pedro Aragonés
- Como la tierra (1954) - Don Nicanor
- Once pares de botas (1954, by Francisco Rovira Beleta) - Ernesto
- La ciudad de los sueños (1954)
- Three are Three (1955) - Announcer (segments "Una de monstruos" and "Una de pandereta")
- The Lost City (1955) - Eliseo
- Congress in Seville (1955, by Antonio Román) - Paco Domínguez
- Good Bye, Sevilla (1955)
- Recluta con niño (1956, by Pedro Luis Ramirez) - Sargento Luis Palomares
- Afternoon of the Bulls (1956) - Jiménez
- The Big Lie (1956) - Representante de César
- ¡Aquí hay petróleo! (1956) - Zoilo Mendoza de Montesinos
- Manolo, guardia urbano (1956, by Rafael J. Salvia) - Manolo Martínez, el guardia urbano
- The Singer from Mexico (1956) - Martínez
- Un abrigo a cuadros (1957) - Doctor Dualte
- Flame Over Vietnam (1957) - Hermano Bartolomé
- Los ángeles del volante (1957) - Pepe
- El bandido generoso (1957)
- Las últimas banderas (1957)
- Historias de la feria (1958) - Gomis
- Amore a prima vista (1958) - Pedro Suárez
- Let's Make the Impossible! (1958, by Rafael Gil) - Don Sabino López
- El puente de la paz (1958) - Benito
- Luxury Cabin (1959) - Don Armando
- College Boarding House (1959, by Rafael Gil) - Minguiños
- La vida alrededor (1959) - Ceferino López Gallego 'El Agujetas'
- Litri and His Shadow (1960) - Naranjito
- Amor bajo cero (1960) - Jaime - el Camarón
- Labios rojos (1960) - Comisario Fernández
- La moglie di mio marito (1961) - Emilio
- Patricia mía (1961)
- Don José, Pepe y Pepito (1961) - Pepe Quiroga
- Alerta en el cielo (1961) - Pepe
- Darling (1961) - Don Ricardo Gravina
- El pobre García (1961) - Himself
- Vamos a contar mentiras (1962) - Bombero
- Las travesuras de Morucha (1962) - Don Claudio
- La pandilla de los once (1963) - El Zampa
- The Blackmailers (1963) - Don Fulgencio, apoderado de Juan
- A Nearly Decent Girl (1963) - Álvarez
- Como dos gotas de agua (1964) - Gregorio 'El Chopín'
- The Pleasure Seekers (1964) - Guardia Urbano (uncredited)
- Destino: Barajas (1965)
- Currito of the Cross (1965) - Copita
- Operation Delilah (1967) - Don Rémulo (final film role)
