= The Cat (1956 film) =

- Directed by: Margarita Alexandre; Rafael María Torrecilla
- Written by: César Fernández Ardavín
- Produced by: Margarita Alexandre; Juan José Melgar; Luis Ramírez Villasuso; Rafael María Torrecilla
- Cinematography: Juan Mariné
- Edited by: Mercedes Alonso
- Music by: Miguel Asins Arbó
- Production companies: Eurociné; Hispano Foxfilms; Nervión Films
- Distributed by: Hispano Foxfilms
- Release date: 1 April 1956
- Running time: 94 minutes
- Countries: France; Spain
- Language: Spanish

The Cat (Spanish:La gata) is a 1956 French-Spanish drama film directed by Margarita Alexandre and Rafael María Torrecilla and starring Aurora Bautista, Jorge Mistral and José Nieto. It is set in the world of bullfighting. It was shot in Eastmancolor and Cinemascope.

== Plot ==
Her name is María, but everyone knows her by the nickname of The Cat. Daughter of the overseer of an Andalusian cortijo, she is wooed by several men of the village, among them the young Joselillo. But The Cat only feels love for Juan, a handsome and cocky worker who dreams of being a bullfighter.

== Cast ==
- Aurora Bautista as María 'La gata'
- Jorge Mistral as Juan
- José Nieto
- Nani Fernández
- José Guardiola
- Felipe Simón
- José Sepúlveda
- Francisco Arenzana
- Santiago Rivero
- Rafael Calvo Revilla
- Tomás Torres
- Manuel Aroca
- María Saco
- Alberto San Martín
- Antonio García Quijada
- Juan Segovia
- María Estrella
- Manuel Regueira
- Paco Martínez
- Mariano Martín Carriles
- Guillermo Méndez

== Bibliography ==
- Bentley, Bernard. A Companion to Spanish Cinema. Boydell & Brewer 2008.
