= From Madrid to Heaven =

1952 film

- Directed by: Rafael Gil
- Written by: Vicente Escrivá
- Produced by: José Manuel Goyanes
- Starring: María de los Ángeles Morales; Gustavo Rojo; Manolo Morán; Félix Fernández
- Cinematography: Michel Kelber
- Edited by: José Antonio Rojo
- Music by: Caballero; Juan Quintero; José Serrano
- Production company: Aspa Producciones Cinematográficas
- Distributed by: Suevia Films
- Release date: 16 May 1952
- Running time: 95 minutes
- Country: Spain
- Language: Spanish

From Madrid to Heaven (Spanish: De Madrid al cielo) is a 1952 Spanish musical comedy film directed by Rafael Gil and starring María de los Ángeles Morales, Gustavo Rojo and Manolo Morán. It is set in early 20th-century Madrid. The film's sets were designed by the art director Enrique Alarcón.

== Cast ==
- María de los Ángeles Morales as Elena del Río
- Gustavo Rojo as Pablo Iriarte
- Manolo Morán as Cayetano
- Julia Caba Alba as Madre de Elena
- Rosario García Ortega as Lily Costa
- Félix Fernández as Sergio
- Mapy Gómez as Nina
- Carmen Sánchez as Marquesa
- Carlos Díaz de Mendoza as Cliente de Pablo
- Luis Hurtado as Simón
- José Prada as Chris Nathanson
- Manuel Kayser as Don José
- José Luis Ozores as Charlatán
- Fernando Sancho as Empresario de 'El Paraíso'
- Juan Vázquez as Conserje hotel
- Casimiro Hurtado as Conserje teatro
- Enrique Herreros
- Francisco Elías
- Francisco Bernal as Mozo maletas
- María Larrabeiti
- Cándida Losada as Susana
- Concha López Silva as Dueña del piso
- Ángel Álvarez as Cochero
- Manuel Guitián

== Release ==
The film premiered at the Cine Avenida on 16 May 1952.

== See also ==
- List of Spanish films of 1952

== Bibliography ==
- Bentley, Bernard. A Companion to Spanish Cinema. Boydell & Brewer 2008.
- Cebollada, Pascual; Santa Eulalia, Mary G. (2000). Madrid y el cine. Panorama filmográfico de cien años de historia (PDF). Madrid: Consejería de Educación. Comunidad de Madrid. p. 57. ISBN 84-451-1821-8.
