= Pepe Rubio =

Spanish actor

Pepe Rubio (September 10, 1931 – March 15, 2012) was a Spanish actor, known for comedies, whose professional career began in 1953 with theater.

Rubio was born in Lubrín, Province of Almería, Andalusia in 1931. His father was a miner. Rubio moved to Barcelona with his family, where he worked as in a textile factory. He joined the military when he was eighteen years old.

Rubio's film debut was in the 1959 Spanish movie, House of Troy. Other credits included the 1963 dramatic film, Dulcinea; Behind the Mask of Zorro in 1965

Pepe Rubio died on March 15, 2012, in Madrid at the age of 80.

== Filmography ==
| Year | Title | Role | Notes |
|---|---|---|---|
| 1956 | We're All Necessary | | |
| 1958 | La frontera del miedo | Operador de radio | |
| 1959 | College Boarding House | Casimiro Barcala | |
| 1960 | El cerro de los locos | Ricardo Peña | |
| 1960 | Litri and His Shadow | Manuel Báez | |
| 1960 | Maria, Registered in Bilbao | Muros | |
| 1961 | Green Harvest | | |
| 1961 | Goliath Against the Giants | Briseo | |
| 1961 | Siempre es domingo | David | |
| 1962 | Cuidado con las personas formales | Agustín | |
| 1962 | You and Me Are Three | Ramiro | |
| 1962 | Dulcinea | Inquisidor | |
| 1963 | Escala en Hi-Fi | | |
| 1964 | Piso de soltero | Enrique | |
| 1964 | La boda era a las doce | Alberto | |
| 1964 | En días como estos | | |
| 1964 | La boda | | |
| 1964 | The Mistresses of Dr. Jekyll | Juan Manuel | |
| 1964 | El señor de La Salle | Pedro | |
| 1964 | Behind the Mask of Zorro | Marcel | |
| 1964 | Dulcinea del Toboso | | |
| 1967 | Los guardiamarinas | Caballero guardamarina Enrique Andrade | |
| 1967 | Fury of Johnny Kid | | |
| 1967 | ¿Qué hacemos con los hijos? | Juan Martínez | |
| 1967 | Las cicatrices | Simón Valeiro | |
| 1967 | Los amores difíciles | | |
| 1968 | Agonizando en el crimen | Henry | |
| 1968 | Cruzada en la mar | Enrique Mendoza | |
| 1969 | No somos ni Romeo ni Julieta | Hombre en la cafetería 3º | Uncredited |
| 1970 | Enseñar a un sinvergüenza | Lorenzo Vega | |
| 1970 | Don Erre que erre | Periodista y Narrador | |
| 1971 | La casa de los Martínez | Pepe | |
| 1971 | Blanca por fuera y Rosa por dentro | Héctor Villarreal, novelista | |
| 1971 | Si Fulano fuese Mengano | Luis Miralles | |
| 1972 | En un mundo nuevo | Carlos Peñafiel | |
