= Ninety Minutes =

1949 film

- Directed by: Antonio del Amo
- Written by: Manuel Mur Oti
- Starring: Nani Fernández; Enrique Guitart
- Cinematography: Juan Mariné
- Edited by: Bienvenida Sanz
- Music by: Jesús García Leoz
- Production company: Castilla Films
- Release date: 1949
- Running time: 85 minutes
- Country: Spain
- Language: Spanish

Ninety Minutes (Spanish: Noventa minutos) is a 1949 Spanish drama film directed by Antonio del Amo and starring Nani Fernández and Enrique Guitart.

The film's art direction was by Sigfrido Burmann.

== Synopsis ==
A group of neighbors with different ideas and circumstances, along with a policeman and a thief, hide in a bomb shelter during a German aerial bombardment of London. Once the attack is over, they discover that they cannot get out of there, because the entrance door is jammed by the rubble. It is from there that they discover that they can die asphyxiated within a maximum period of ninety minutes, which will change the lives of all of them and will make the true identity of each one emerge.

== Cast ==
- Julia Caba Alba as Sra. Winter
- Fernando Fernán Gómez as Sr. Marchand
- Nani Fernández as Doctora Suárez
- Enrique Guitart as Richard
- José Jaspe as Sr. Dupont
- José María Lado as Preston
- Mary Lamar as Sra. Dupont
- Gina Montes as Clara Marchand
- Lolita Moreno as Helen Winter
- Carlos Muñoz as John
- Jacinto San Emeterio as Albert

== Bibliography ==
- de España, Rafael. Directory of Spanish and Portuguese film-makers and films. Greenwood Press, 1994.
