= Four Women (1947 film) =

- Directed by: Antonio del Amo
- Written by: Manuel Mur Oti
- Starring: Fosco Giachetti; María Denis
- Cinematography: Manuel Berenguer
- Edited by: Bienvenida Sanz
- Music by: Jesús García Leoz
- Production company: Sagitario Films
- Release date: 8 December 1947
- Running time: 127 minutes
- Country: Spain
- Language: Spanish

Four Women (Spanish:Cuatro mujeres) is a 1947 Spanish drama film directed by Antonio del Amo and starring Fosco Giachetti and María Denis.

== Synopsis ==
Four men playing poker at a bar table see a woman enter, and their vision reminds each of them of past love experiences.

== Cast ==
- Matilde Artero
- Tomás Blanco
- Manuel de Juan
- María Denis
- Elda Garza
- Margarete Genske
- Fosco Giachetti
- Amparo Guerrero
- Alfredo Herrero
- José Jaspe
- Arturo Marín
- Carlos Muñoz
- Luis Prendes
- Emilio Ruiz de Córdoba

== Bibliography ==
- D'Lugo, Marvin. Guide to the Cinema of Spain. Greenwood Publishing, 1997.
