= The Bell from Hell =

- Spanish: La campana del infierno
- Directed by: Claudio Guerín Hill; Juan Antonio Bardem
- Screenplay by: Santiago Moncada
- Story by: Santiago Moncada
- Produced by: Luis Laso
- Starring: Renaud Verley; Viveca Lindfors; Alfredo Mayo; Maribel Martín; Tito García
- Cinematography: Manuel Rojas
- Edited by: Magdalena Pulido
- Music by: Adolfo Waitzman
- Production companies: Hesperia Films S.A. Les Films de la Boétie
- Distributed by: Mercurio Films S.A.
- Release date: 1973
- Running time: 106 minutes
- Country: Spain
- Language: Spanish

The Bell from Hell (Spanish: La campana del infierno) is a 1973 Spanish-French horror film directed by Claudio Guerin Hill. The film is also known as The Bells or A Bell from Hell. Guerin, the director, died from an accidental fall from the bell tower set while directing the film, and the project had to be completed by Juan Antonio Bardem.

== Cast ==
- Renaud Verley - Juan
- Viveca Lindfors - Marta
- Alfredo Mayo - Don Pedro
- Maribel Martín - Esther
- Nuria Gimeno - Teresa
- Christina von Blanc - María (credited as Christine Betzner)
