= The Unloved Woman (1940 film) =

- Directed by: José López Rubio
- Written by: Jacinto Benavente (play); José López Rubio
- Cinematography: Theodore J. Pahle
- Music by: Jesús Guridi
- Production company: Ufilms
- Distributed by: Ufilms
- Release date: 9 October 1940
- Running time: 94 minutes
- Country: Spain
- Language: Spanish

The Unloved Woman (Spanish:La malquerida) is a 1940 Spanish drama film directed by José López Rubio. It is based on the 1913 play of the same title by Jacinto Benavente.

== Synopsis ==
Doña Raimunda and her daughter Acacia live in the El Soto hacienda. After becoming a widow, Raimunda contracted new marriages with Esteban, who is secretly in love with Acacia, who hates him. Esteban will try to get rid of all the men who court Acacia.

== Cast ==
- Antonio Armet as El Rubio
- Társila Criado as Raimunda
- Manolo Morán as Pascual
- Carlos Muñoz as Faustino
- Julio Peña as Norberto
- Luchy Soto as Acacia
- Jesús Tordesillas as Esteban
- Isabel de Pomés as Chica en balcón

== Bibliography ==
- Labanyi, Jo & Pavlović, Tatjana. A Companion to Spanish Cinema. John Wiley & Sons, 2012.
