= Alfredo Mayo =

Spanish actor (1911–1985)

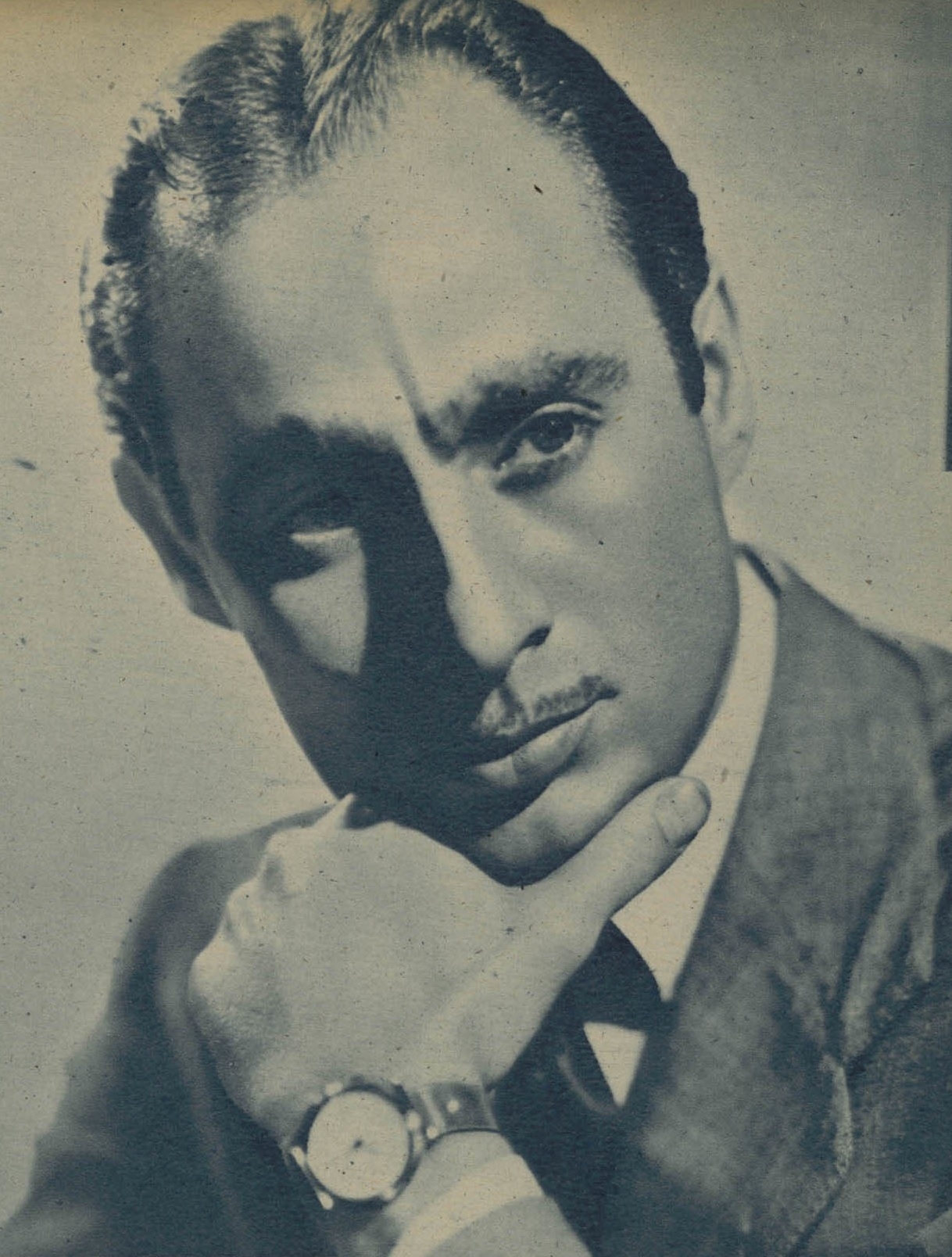
- Born: Alfredo Fernández Martínez; 17 May 1911; Barcelona, Spain
- Died: 19 May 1985 (aged 74); Palma, Spain
- Occupation: Actor
- Years active: 1935-1985

Alfredo Fernández Martínez (17 May 1911 in Barcelona – 19 May 1985 in Palma de Mallorca) better known as Alfredo Mayo was a Spanish actor.

== Biography ==
After studying medicine, in 1929 Mayo made his debut in the theatre with the company of Ernesto Vilches. He fought for Francisco Franco in the Spanish Civil War in aviation. He starred in propaganda films such as Escuadrilla (1941), Harka (1941), A mí la legión (1942) but is perhaps best known for Raza, written by Francisco Franco under the name of Jaime de Andrade.

He became a major star in comedies, dramas and historical films such as Malvaloca (1942), by Luis Marquina; Deliciosamente tontos (1943), by Juan de Orduña, or La leona de Castilla (1951).

In the 1950s he acted in supporting roles in such films as El último cuplé (1957), Una muchachita de Valladolid (1958) and 55 Days at Peking (1963), directed in Spain by Nicholas Ray.

His career had a second golden age during his collaborations with Carlos Saura in La Caza (1966) and Peppermint Frappé (1967).

He appeared in more than 175 other films until his death. He acted in El bosque del lobo (1970), by Pedro Olea, Patrimonio Nacional (1980), by Luis García Berlanga. In Paul Naschy's Los cántabros (1980), he played a druid. He was also in Bearn o la sala de las muñecas (1982), by Jaime Chávarri and starred in the TV series Cañas y barro for Televisión Española.

== Selected filmography ==
- El ciento trece (1935) - Marcelo
- Las tres gracias (1936)
- The Queen's Flower Girl (1940)
- ¡Harka! (1941) - Capitán Santiago Balcázar
- Escuadrilla (1941) - Teniente Miguel
- Sarasate (1941) - Pablo Sarasate
- Raza (1942) - José Churruca
- Follow the Legion (1942) - El Grajo
- Malvaloca (1942) - Leonardo
- El frente de los suspiros (1942) - Pablo Cañaveral
- A Famous Gentleman (1943) - Rafael
- Deliciosamente tontos (1943) - Ernesto Acevedo
- El abanderado (1943) - Javier Torrealta
- Arribada forzosa (1944) - Esteban Montaño
- The Road to Babel (1945) - César Jiménez
- Afan Evu (1945)
- Su última noche (1945) - Fernando
- Audiencia pública (1946) - Raúl Pituá
- Chantaje (1946)
- Héroes del 95 (1947) - Teniente Padilla
- El huésped del cuarto número 13 (1947) - Duke of Gomara
- Obsesión (1947) - Víctor Sánchez del Campo
- Luis Candelas, el ladrón de Madrid (1947) - Luís Candelas
- Amanhã Como Hoje (1948) - Miguel
- El marqués de Salamanca (1948) - José de Salamanca
- El santuario no se rinde (1949) - Luis de Aracil
- Peace (1949) - Federico
- The Seventh Page (1951) - Paco
- La Virgen gitana (1951) - Eduardo Miranda
- María Antonia 'La Caramba' (1951)
- The Lioness of Castille (1951) - Manrique
- Hombre acosado (1952) - Fussot
- The Mayor of Zalamea (1954) - Don Álvaro
- High Fashion (1954) - Ramón
- It Happened in Seville (1955) - Alberto Campos
- Suspenso en comunismo (1956) - Demetrio
- Playa prohibida (1956)
- La espera (1956)
- Piedras vivas (1956)
- The Last Torch Song (1957) - Gran Duque Vladimir de Rusia
- Il maestro... (1957) - Principal
- Heroes del Aire (1958) - Coronel Gonzalo Rivas
- Una muchachita de Valladolid (1958) - Raimundo Aymat - el Canciller
- 15 bajo la lona (1959) - Capitán
- Canto para ti (1959) - Pedro
- Pasos de angustia (1959)
- Legions of the Nile (1959) - Ottaviano Augusto
- Mission in Morocco (1960) - Major Selim Naruf
- Monsieur Robinson Crusoe (1960)
- Juanito (1960) - Colonel Cuesta
- Un ángel tuvo la culpa (1960) - Comisario
- Fountain of Trevi (1960) - Sor Giovanni
- Don Lucio y el hermano pío (1960) - Casinos
- One Step Forward (1960)
- Queen of the Tabarin Club (1960) - Charles
- Alerta en el cielo (1961) - Coronel Gadea
- Revolt of the Mercenaries (1961) - Marco
- Darling (1961) - Minister
- Armas contra la ley (1961)
- Fray Escoba (1961) - Don Juan de Porres
- Teresa de Jesús (1962) - Padre Francisco de Borja
- Historia de una noche (1962) - Del Río
- The Legion's Last Patrol (1962) - Mayor
- Siempre en mi recuerdo (1962)
- Los guerrilleros (1963) - Padre Antonio
- El turista (1963) - Don Luis
- 55 Days at Peking (1963) - Spanish Minister
- Tomy's Secret (1963)
- Cerrado por asesinato (1964) - Luis de la Hoz, novelista
- Cyrano et d'Artagnan (1964) - (uncredited)
- Alféreces provisionales (1964) - Baquero
- Casi un caballero (1964) - Eduardo Montalbán - inspector de policía
- Bullets and the Flesh (1964) - Mortimer Lasky
- Badmen of the West (1964) - Philipp
- El señor de La Salle (1964) - Lanceroy
- Faites vos jeux, mesdames (1965)
- Agent 077: Mission Bloody Mary (1965)
- Two Mafiosi Against Goldginger (1965) - Automobilista Affeminato
- Espionage in Lisbon (1965) - Losky
- Attack of the Robots (1966) - Inspector Baxter
- Las últimas horas... (1966) - Juan de la Cierva
- The Hunt (1966) - Paco
- Special Mission Lady Chaplin (1966) - Sir Hillary
- Ypotron - Final Countdown (1966) - Morrow / Leikman
- Dos alas (1967)
- Peppermint Frappé (1967) - Pablo
- Si volvemos a vernos (1968) - Luis
- Madigan's Millions (1968)
- Este cura (1968)
- No le busques tres pies... (1968) - Mota
- El paseíllo (1968)
- El taxi de los conflictos (1969) - Alfredo, el amante
- Hell Commandos (1969) - Prof. van Kolstrom
- Los desafíos (1969) - Germán (segment 2)
- Eagles Over London (1969) - English officer (uncredited)
- ¿Quién soy yo? (1970) - Pedro Astófano
- In the Folds of the Flesh (1970) - André
- El mejor del mundo (1970) - Doctor Márquez
- Sabata the Killer (1970) - Garfield
- El bosque del lobo (1970) - Don Nicolás de Valcárcel
- Los gallos de la madrugada (1971) - Padre de Paco
- La red de mi canción (1971) - Don Manuel Duval
- My Dear Killer (1972) - Beniamino
- Monta in sella, figlio di… (1972) - André, Agnes' Uncle
- Un dólar de recompensa (1972) - John Wolley
- Marianela (1972) - D. Francisco
- Entre dos amores (1972) - Duque de Agramonte
- Trop jolies pour être honnêtes (1972)
- The Call of the Wild (1972) - Judge Miller
- Those Dirty Dogs (1973) - General Müller, El Supremo
- The Scarlet Letter (1973) - Gov. Fuller
- La llamaban La Madrina (1973) - Don Ramón
- The Bell from Hell (1973) - Don Pedro
- Volveré a nacer (1973) - Oscar
- Storia di karatè, pugni e fagioli (1973) - Colonel Randolf Quint
- Vida conyugal sana (1974) - Don Alfonso
- Proceso a Jesús (1974) - Profesor Bellido
- Vera, un cuento cruel (1974) - D. Juan Manuel
- El calzonazos (1974) - Héctor Goizueta
- Voodoo Black Exorcist (1974) - Dr. Kessling
- Los caballeros del Botón de Ancla (1974) - Morales
- Chicas de alquiler (1974) - Don Carlos
- Doctor, me gustan las mujeres, ¿es grave? (1974) - Dr. Ángel Alcántara
- Larga noche de julio (1974) - Padre de Toni
- Naked Therapy (1975) - Doctor Armayor
- Un día con Sergio (1976) - Productor
- La amante perfecta (1976)
- El límite del amor (1976) - Ricardo
- Call Girl (La vida privada de una señorita bien) (1976) - Alejandro
- La espuela (1976) - Don Pedro
- El chiste (1976) - Hombre emocionado / Emiliano / Alfredo
- Pasión (1977)
- El apolítico (1977) - Sr. Bustos
- Secretos de alcoba (1977) - Conde
- Estoy hecho un chaval (1977) - Don Amalio
- Gusanos de seda (1977) - D. Ernesto
- Delirio d'amore (1977) - Aldo
- Los restos del naufragio (1978) - Don Emilio
- Red Gold (1978) - Padre de Aurelia
- Avisa a Curro Jiménez (1978) - Don Fulgencio
- Cabo de vara (1978)
- Encuentro en el abismo (1979) - Pop
- Con uñas y dientes (1979) - Rodolfo Ortiz
- El tahúr (1979)
- Manaos (1979) - Sebastián
- Los cántabros (1980) - Lábaro
- National Heritage (1981) - Nacho
- Quiero soñar (1981) - Alfredo
- La leyenda del tambor (1981) - Abuelo de Clussá
- Perdóname, amor (1982)
- Cecilia (1982) - General Vives
- Cristóbal Colón, de oficio... descubridor (1982) - Fray Diego de Deza
- Hablamos esta noche (1982) - Padre
- Bearn o la sala de las muñecas (1983) - Vicario
- Mar brava (1983) - Anchoa
- El Cid cabreador (1983) - Padre de Rodrigo
- Poppers (1984) - Pablo Jordan
- Luces de bohemia (1985) - Marqués de Bradomín
- El suizo - un amour en Espagne (1985) - (final film role)

== Awards ==
- Círculo de escritores cinematográficos in 1966 for La caza and in 1969 for Los desafíos.
- Sindicato Nacional del Espectáculo in (1973) for La campana del infierno.
