= Enrique Herreros =

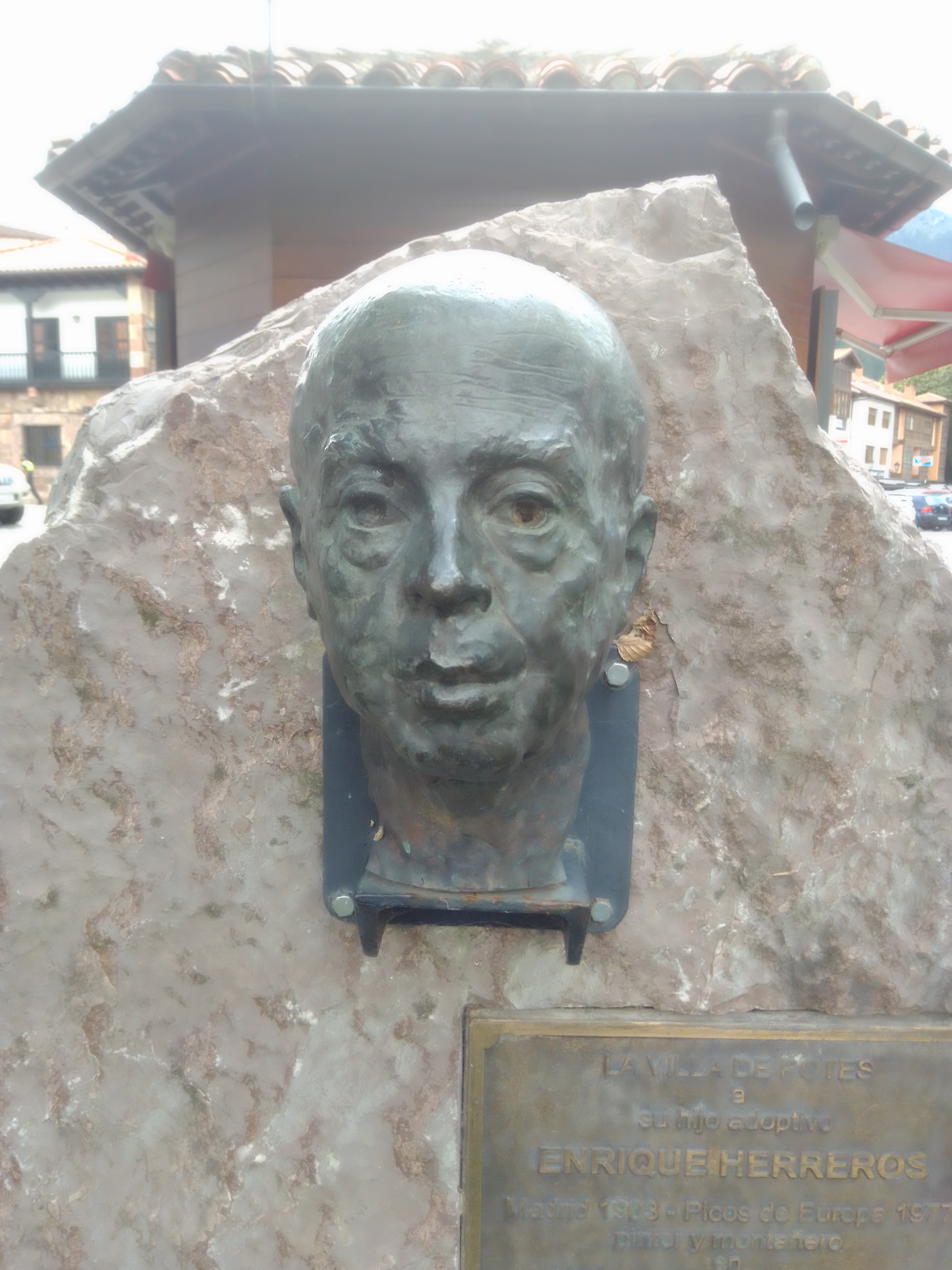
- Bust in Potes
- Born: Enrique García-Herreros Codesido; 29 December 1903; Madrid, Spain
- Died: 18 September 1977 (aged 73); Áliva, Cantabria
- Burial place: Cemetery of Potes
- Occupation(s): Humorist, drafter, poster artist, filmmaker and mountaineer
- Spouse: Ernestina Maenza

Enrique García-Herreros Codesido (29 December 1903 - 18 September 1977) was a Spanish humorist, drafter, poster artist, filmmaker and mountaineer.

Luis García Berlanga defined him as the one who invented the promotion and advertising. He found out Nati Mistral and he was the personal manager of Sara Montiel until 12 December 1963.

He died from an accident while climbing Cornión, Picos de Europa, on 18 September 1977.

He was married to the Olympic sportswoman Ernestina Maenza Fernández-Calvo, with whom he had a child.

== Filmography ==
=== As actor ===
- La vida es magnífica (1965)
- Cabaret (1953) as Señor en baño
- De Madrid al cielo (1952)
- El gran Galeoto (1951) as Nicasio Heredia de la Escosura
- La revoltosa (1950) as Mozo de cuerda
- Aventuras de Juan Lucas (1949)
- Don Quijote de la Mancha (1947) as Doctor Pedro Recio
- Senda ignorada (1946) as Espectador
- Cinco lobitos (1945)
- Espronceda (1945) as Padrino 2
- La vida en un hilo (1945) as Taxista
- El fantasma y Dª Juanita (1945) as El faquir
- El destino se disculpa (1945) as Empresario
- El clavo (1944) as Señor bajito
- Eloísa está debajo de un almendro (1943) as Acomodador del cine
- Yo quiero que me lleven a Hollywood (1931)

=== As director ===
- La muralla feliz (1948)
- María Fernanda, la Jerezana (1947)
- Al pie del Almanzor (1942)

=== As producer ===
- Noches de Casablanca (1963)
