= Pride (1955 film) =

1955 film

- Directed by: Manuel Mur Oti
- Written by: Jaime Garcia-Herranz
- Produced by: Manuel Mur Oti
- Cinematography: Juan Mariné
- Edited by: Juan Serra
- Music by: Salvador Ruiz de Luna
- Production company: Celta Films
- Distributed by: CIFESA
- Release date: 9 December 1955
- Running time: 106 minutes
- Country: Spain
- Language: Spanish

Pride (Spanish: Orgullo) is a 1955 Spanish drama film directed by Manuel Mur Oti.

== Cast ==
- Xan das Bolas
- Eduardo Calvo as Fidel
- Arturo Castro 'Bigotón'
- Francisco de Cossío
- Beni Deus
- Enrique Diosdado as Don Enrique
- Félix Fernández as Obrero
- María Francés
- Matilde Guarnerio
- Rufino Inglés
- Cándida Losada as La madre
- Julián Muñoz
- Guillermo Méndez
- Fernando Nogueras as Ramón
- Nicolás D. Perchicot
- José Prada
- Marisa Prado as Laura
- Domingo Rivas
- Alfonso Rojas
- Alberto Ruschel
- Luisa Sala
- Vicente Ávila

== Bibliography ==
- Bentley, Bernard. A Companion to Spanish Cinema. Boydell & Brewer 2008.
