= Anguish (1947 film) =

- Directed by: José Antonio Nieves Conde
- Written by: José Antonio Nieves Conde; Antonio Pérez Sánchez; Ricardo Toledo
- Starring: Rafael Bardem; Julia Caba Alba; María Francés
- Cinematography: José F. Aguayo
- Music by: Jesús Guridi
- Release date: 1947
- Running time: 88 minutes
- Country: Spain
- Language: Spanish

Anguish (Spanish: Angustia) is a 1947 Spanish crime film directed by José Antonio Nieves Conde and starring Rafael Bardem, Julia Caba Alba and María Francés.

== Cast ==
- Rafael Bardem as Inspector
- Julia Caba Alba as Lula
- María Francés as Sra. Jarque
- Milagros Leal as Olivia
- Carmen de Lucio as Isabel
- Fernando Nogueras as Canel
- Adriano Rimoldi as Marcos
- Amparo Rivelles as Elena
- José María Rodero as Andrés
- Aníbal Vela as Sr. Marí
- Ángel Álvarez as Bibliotecario

== Bibliography ==
- D'Lugo, Marvin. Guide to the Cinema of Spain. Greenwood Publishing, 1997.
