= The Devil Plays the Flute =

1953 film by José María Forqué

- Directed by: José María Forqué
- Written by: Noel Clarasó; José María Forqué
- Produced by: Jorge Tusell
- Starring: José Luis Ozores; Luis Prendes; Luis Arroyo
- Cinematography: Cecilio Paniagua
- Edited by: Margarita de Ochoa
- Music by: César Latorre
- Production company: Estela Films
- Distributed by: CIFESA
- Release date: 1953
- Running time: 91 minutes
- Country: Spain
- Language: Spanish

The Devil Plays the Flute (Spanish:El diablo toca la flauta) is a 1953 Spanish comedy film directed by José María Forqué and starring José Luis Ozores, Luis Prendes and Luis Arroyo.

== Plot ==
When the pieces of a singular figure are unearthed and then joined, a devil of the lowest category breaks into a small Mediterranean village. From that moment on, the demon will enter the life of a painter named Bernardino, in the affairs of a "modern" marriage, in the existence of a frightened gardener and, finally, in the day-to-day life of the Great Momo.

== Cast ==
- José Luis Ozores as Músico
- Luis Prendes as Bernaldino
- Luis Arroyo as Relojero
- Félix Dafauce as Momo
- Carmen Vázquez Vigo as Esposa
- Antonio Garisa as Marido
- Ricardo Acero as Pablo
- Irán Eory as Elisa
- José Prada as Jardinero
- Juan Vázquez as Delegado
- Antonio Ozores as Secretario
- Luis Orduña as Diablo jefe
- Xan das Bolas as Presidente
- Miguel Pastor as Europeo
- Adela Carboné as Laura
- José Ramón Giner as Conserje museo
- Manuel Requena as Alcalde
- José Luis López Vázquez as Periodista
- Delfina Jaufret
- Marcela Yurfa
- Trudy Losada
- José Villasante as Gobernante
- Amparo Gómez Ramos
- Ramón Navarro
- Emilio González de Hervás
- Emilio Gutiérrez
- Ángel Calero as Maître con secretario
- Pedro Tena
- Félix Briones as Miguelote, botones
- José Capilla
- Joaquín Bergía as Médico
- Juan Cazalilla as Peluquero
- Alfonso Rojas
- José María Rodríguez as Viejo hambriento
- José Marco
- Carlos Ciscar
- Manolo Morán as Don Cosme
- Miguel Gila as Burócrata

== Bibliography ==
- Bentley, Bernard. A Companion to Spanish Cinema. Boydell & Brewer 2008.
