= Dulcinea (film) =

- Directed by: Vicente Escrivá
- Written by: Ramón D. Faraldo; Based on the play by Gaston Baty
- Produced by: Vicente Escrivá
- Starring: Millie Perkins; Cameron Mitchell; Folco Lulli
- Cinematography: Godofredo Pacheco
- Edited by: Pablo González del Amo
- Music by: Giovanni Fusco
- Distributed by: Chamartín
- Release date: 1962
- Running time: 94 minutes
- Country: Spain
- Languages: English, Spanish

Dulcinea is a 1962 Spanish drama film directed by Vicente Escrivá, and based on the play by Gaston Baty. It stars Millie Perkins, Cameron Mitchell and Folco Lulli.

It was screened at the 23rd Venice International Film Festival. It won the 1963 Best Film CEC Award at Spain's Cinema Writers Circle Awards, and was selected as the Spanish entry for the Best Foreign Language Film at the 35th Academy Awards, but was not accepted as a nominee.

== Cast ==
- Millie Perkins as Aldonza / Dulcinea
- Folco Lulli as Sancho Panza
- Cameron Mitchell as El Renegado
- Walter Santesso as Diego (as Walter Santeso)
- Vittoria Prada as Blanca (as Victoria Prada)
- Pepe Rubio as Inquisitor (as José Rubio)
- Andrés Mejuto as El Hidalgo
- Antonio Garisa as Pietro
- Hans Söhnker as Judge
- Ana María Noé as Sick woman
- José Guardiola as Witness in trial
- Antonio Ferrandis as Beggar

== See also ==
- List of submissions to the 35th Academy Awards for Best Foreign Language Film
- List of Spanish submissions for the Academy Award for Best Foreign Language Film
