= Calypso Joe =

- Theatrical release poster
- Directed by: Edward Dein
- Screenplay by: Edward Dein; Mildred Dein
- Produced by: William F. Broidy
- Starring: Herb Jeffries; Angie Dickinson; Ed Kemmer; Stephen Bekassy; Laurie Mitchell; Claudia Drake
- Cinematography: Stuart Thompson
- Edited by: Thor L. Brooks
- Music by: Richard Hazard
- Production company: William F. Broidy Productions
- Distributed by: Allied Artists Pictures
- Release date: June 9, 1957
- Running time: 76 minutes
- Country: United States
- Language: English

Calypso Joe is a 1957 American musical film directed by Edward Dein and written by Edward Dein and Mildred Dein. The film stars Herb Jeffries, Angie Dickinson, Ed Kemmer, Stephen Bekassy, Laurie Mitchell, and Claudia Drake. The film was released on June 9, 1957, by Allied Artists Pictures.

== Plot ==
The story is about a woman named Julie, an airline hostess. She has decided to marry a South American millionaire named Rico Vargas, despite the efforts of her former boyfriend Lee Darling, a television star, to win her back. Rico's sister, Astra, tries to make a move on Lee, who responds only to make Julie jealous. Just as the plane carrying Julie and all the credited musicians and bands is about to take off, Calypso Joe smuggles Lee on board so he can have a chance to change Julie's mind.

== Cast ==
- Herb Jeffries as Calypso Joe
- Angie Dickinson as Julie
- Ed Kemmer as Lee Darling
- Stephen Bekassy as Rico Vargas
- Laurie Mitchell as Leah
- Claudia Drake as Astra Vargas
- Murray Alper as Transfer Man
- Linda Terrace as Lady T
- Charles Keane as Pilot
- Genie Stone as Television Actress
- Robert Sherman as Co-Pilot
- Lord Flea as himself
- Duke of Iron (Cecil Anderson) as himself
