= Intrigue (1942 film) =

- Directed by: Antonio Román
- Written by: Wenceslao Fernández Flórez (novel); Miguel Mihura; Pedro de Juan; Antonio Román
- Starring: Blanca de Silos; Manolo Morán
- Cinematography: Michel Kelber
- Music by: Salvador Ruiz de Luna
- Production company: Hércules Films
- Distributed by: Hércules Films
- Release date: 1942
- Country: Spain
- Language: Spanish

Intrigue (Spanish:Intriga) is a 1942 Spanish comedy mystery film directed by Antonio Román and starring Blanca de Silos and Manolo Morán. It is based on a novel by Wenceslao Fernández Flórez.

== Cast ==
- Mary Cruz
- Blanca de Silos
- Miguel del Castillo
- Ramón Elías
- Mariana Larrabeiti
- Manolo Morán as Inspector Ferrer
- Guadalupe Muñoz Sampedro
- Julio Peña as Roberto Téllez
- José Portes

== Bibliography ==
- Bentley, Bernard. A Companion to Spanish Cinema. Boydell & Brewer 2008.
