= Mariona Rebull (novel) =

1943 novel by Ignacio Agustí

- 1944 edition
- Author: Ignacio Agustí
- Language: Spanish
- Genre: Historical; Romance
- Publisher: Ediciones Destino
- Publication date: 1943
- Publication place: Spain
- Media type: Print

Mariona Rebull is a 1943 novel by the Spanish writer Ignacio Agustí. It is a historical romance, set amongst the high society of nineteenth century Barcelona. A young, neglected wife begins a passionate affair, which ultimately ends in tragedy.

In 1947 the novel was turned into a film of the same title, with Blanca de Silos playing the title role.

== Bibliography ==
- Helio San Miguel, Lorenzo J. Torres Hortelano. World Film Locations: Barcelona. Intellect Books, 2013.
