= Luisa Sala =

Spanish actress

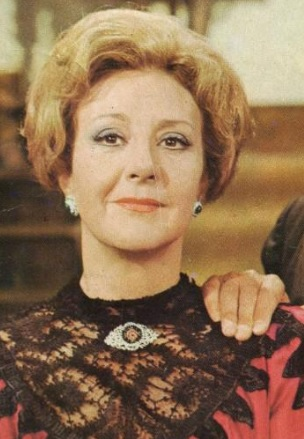
Spanish Actress Luisa Sala in 1974

Luisa Sala (7 July 1923 – 16 June 1986) was an actress of stage, film and television from the 1950s to 1980s.

She was born on 7 July 1923 in Madrid, Spain. She was the New York Times' "Critic's Pick" in 1965 for her performance in the film Aquella jóven de blanco, also known in Spain as El Milagro de Lourdes, for her performance in the role of the mother of 'Bernardita de Lourdes' ('St. Bernadette').

== Acting history ==
- La Comedia dramática española, La (TV, 1986) - episode
- Platos rotos (TV series; 10 episodes as "Julia", 1985-1986)
- Anillos de oro (TV series) (1983) - episode
- Cuestión de principios (1983) - episode
- Teatro breve (TV series, 1980-1981) - 2 episodes
- Estudio 1 (TV series, 1965 - 1980), 31 episodes as "Doña Elena"
- El Señor Villanueva y su gente (TV series 1979)
- El Acto (1979)
- Teatro estudio (TV series, 1978) - episode
- Novela (TV series, 1963-1978) - 38 episodes
- Curro Jiménez (TV series, 1978) - episode
- Cañas y Barro (1978) (miniseries)
- Mujeres insólitas (TV series, 1977) - 2 episodes
- Telecomedia (TV series, 1974) - episode
- Los Maniáticos (TV series, 1974) - episode
- Proyectos de matrimonio (TV series, 1974) - episode
- Noche de teatro (TV series, 1974) - episode
- Si yo fuera rico (TV series, 1973-1974) - episodes
- Si yo fuera inteligente (TV, 1974) - episode
- Si yo fuera jefe de relaciones públicas (TV, 1974) - episode
- Si yo fuera actor (TV, 1974) - episode
- Si yo fuera guapo (TV, 1974) - episode
- Si yo fuera propietario (TV, 1973) - episodes
- Una monja y un Don Juán (1973)
- Siete piezas cortas (TV, 1972) - episode
- Hora once (TV, 1969-1972) - 3 episodes
- Los jóvenes amantes (1971)
- Teatro de siempre (TV, 1967-1971) - 6 episodes
- Juegos para mayores (TV, 1971) - 2 episodes
- Las Tentaciones (TV, 1970) - 2 episodes
- Remite Maribel (TV, 1970) - episode
- Al filo de lo imposible (TV, 1970) - 2 episodes
- Una maleta para un cadáver
- Diana en negro (TV, 1970) - episode
- Las Nenas del mini-mini (1969)
- La risa española (TV, 1969) - 2 episodes
- Las Amigas (TV, 1969) (as Luisa Salas)
- Pequeño estudio (TV, 1968-1969) - 3 episodes
- Historias naturales (TV, 1968) - episode
- La pequeña comedia (TV, 1966-1968) - 2 episodes
- Los chicos del Perú (1967)
- Y al final esperanza (TV, 1967) - episode
- Autores invitados (TV, 1967) - episode
- Aquella jóven de blanco (TV, 1965)
- El Secreto del Dr. Orloff (1964)
- Sospecha (TV, 1963) - episode
- Primera fila (TV, 1963) - episode
- Las chicas de la Cruz Roja (1958)
- Ana dice [que] sí (1958)
- Muchachas de azúl (1957)
- Pride (1955)
- It Happened in Seville (1955)
- Women's Town (1953)
