= Guest of Darkness =

- Directed by: Antonio del Amo
- Written by: Antonio Gimeno; Manuel Mur Oti
- Starring: Carlos Muñoz; Pastora Peña
- Cinematography: Manuel Berenguer
- Music by: Jesús García Leoz
- Production companies: ERCE; Sagitario Films
- Release date: 20 September 1948
- Running time: 109 minutes
- Country: Spain
- Language: Spanish

Guest of Darkness (Spanish: El huésped de las tinieblas) is a 1948 Spanish historical drama film directed by Antonio del Amo and starring Carlos Muñoz and Pastora Peña. It portrays the life of the nineteenth century romanticist poet and writer Gustavo Adolfo Bécquer.

== Cast ==
- Manuel Aguilera
- Fernando Aguirre
- Valeriano Andrés
- Manuel Arbó
- Mario Berriatúa
- Tomás Blanco
- Irene Caba Alba
- María Carrizo
- Carlos Casaravilla
- Félix Fernández
- Elda Garza
- Julia Lajos
- Arturo Marín
- Mari Paz Molinero
- Carlos Muñoz
- Nicolás D. Perchicot
- Pastora Peña
- Joaquín Roa
- Conrado San Martín

== Bibliography ==
- Mira, Alberto. The A to Z of Spanish Cinema. Rowman & Littlefield, 2010.
