= Un Pecado Por Mes =

Un pecado por mes
- Directed by: Mario C. Lugones
- Written by: Julio Porter
- Produced by: Francisco Oyarzábal
- Starring: Susana Canales; Norma Giménez; Hugo Pimentel; Miguel Gómez Bao
- Cinematography: Alfredo Traverso
- Edited by: Jacobo Spoliansky
- Music by: George Andreani
- Production company: Lumiton
- Release date: May 18, 1949
- Running time: 78 minutes
- Country: Argentina
- Language: Spanish

Un Pecado Por Mes (transl. One sin per month) is a 1949 Argentine comedy film of the classical era of Argentine cinema, directed by Mario C. Lugones and written by Julio Porter. It premiered on May 18, 1949.

== Plot ==
Paloma and Marcel simulate toward each other that they are rich as they develop a whirlwind romance. She works as a secretary at a prominent auction house. He is a full-time student whose poor parents struggle to pay his tuition. To impress her, Marcel claims to be from a family of wealthy ranchers. To impress him, Paloma claims to be the daughter of Belisario Quintana, her wealthy employer who, apart from being her boss, is also her family's landlord. As the two get closer, their deceptions begin to unravel.

== Cast ==
- Pedro Vargas
- Susana Canales
- Norma Giménez
- Hugo Pimentel
- Miguel Gómez Bao
- Diego Martínez
- Ramón J. Garay
- Herminia Mas
- José Nájera
- Pola Neuman
- Ricardo de Rosas
- Hedy Crilla
- Enrique de Pedro
- Tato Bores

== Release ==
Released theatrically in Argentina in 1949, the film was released on DVD in 2009.
