= House of Cards (1943 film) =

- Directed by: Jerónimo Mihura
- Written by: Antonio de Obregón; Aileen O'Brien; Miguel Mihura; Jerónimo Mihura
- Starring: Blanca de Silos; Raúl Cancio; Manolo Morán; Camino Garrigó
- Cinematography: Michel Kelber
- Edited by: Sara Ontañón
- Music by: Juan Quintero
- Production company: Cinematográfica Vulcano
- Distributed by: Mercurio Films
- Release date: 17 May 1943
- Running time: 92 minutes
- Country: Spain
- Language: Spanish

House of Cards (Spanish:Castillo de naipes) is a 1943 Spanish comedy film directed by Jerónimo Mihura and starring Blanca de Silos, Raúl Cancio and Manolo Morán.

== Cast ==
- Blanca de Silos as Carmen
- Raúl Cancio as Luis
- Manolo Morán as Paco
- Camino Garrigó as Grandmother
- Joaquín Roa as José
- José Alburquerque as Notary
- José Portes as Don Fermín
- Josefina Ragel as Soubrette
- Félix Fernandez as Editor
- Concha López Silva as Cook
- David Kilgore as Mister X
- Eduardo Álvaro as Editorial Janitor
- Eugenio García as Doctor
- Pilar Santisteban as Girl
- Amelia Merino as Carmen's Friend
- Carmita Garcia as Dancer

== Bibliography ==
- Labanyi, Jo & Pavlović, Tatjana. A Companion to Spanish Cinema. John Wiley & Sons, 2012.
