= Monsieur Robinson Crusoe =

1960 film

- Directed by: Jacques Pinoteau
- Written by: René Fallet; Jacques Pinoteau; Jacques Vilfrid
- Starring: Darry Cowl; Blanca de Silos; Alfredo Mayo
- Cinematography: Juan Mariné
- Music by: Gérard Calvi
- Production companies: Les Films du Cyclope; Producciones Benito Perojo
- Distributed by: Columbia Films (Spain)
- Release date: 2 March 1960
- Running time: 93 minutes
- Countries: France; Spain
- Language: French

Monsieur Robinson Crusoe (French: Robinson et le triporteur) is a 1960 French-Spanish comedy film directed by Jacques Pinoteau and starring Darry Cowl, Blanca de Silos and Alfredo Mayo. It is the sequel to the 1957 film The Tricyclist.

== Cast ==
- Darry Cowl as Antoine Peyralout
- Blanca de Silos
- Alfredo Mayo
- Julio Peña
- Elena Barrios
- Teresa del Río
- Billy Kearns
- Patrick MacGrady
- Carlos Casaravilla
- Don Ziegler as Popeline's Father
- Béatrice Altariba as Popeline
- Edward Fleming
- Cándida Losada
- Edy Silvain

== Bibliography ==
- Philippe Rège. Encyclopedia of French Film Directors, Volume 1. Scarecrow Press, 2009.
