= Rafael García Serrano =

Spanish writer and journalist (1917–1988)

- Born: 11 February 1917; Pamplona, Spain
- Died: 12 October 1988 (aged 71); Madrid, Spain
- Occupations: Novelist, Screenwriter
- Years active: 1952–1976 (film)

Rafael García Serrano (11 February 1917 – 12 October 1988) was a Spanish writer and journalist who held a Falangist ideology. As a teenager he joined the Spanish Falange and participated as a combatant on the Nationalist side in the Spanish Civil War.

Throughout his career he worked with multiple media outlets, writing novels themed around the Spanish Civil War and travel diaries. Serrano had an active role during the Franco dictatorship, overseeing operation of Arriba España, the official newspaper of the Falange.

He worked as a screenwriter on a number of films. He also directed the 1967 film Lost Eyes.

García Serrano never repented of his Falangist past. Despite this, he is still well regarded in Spain for the quality of his writing.

== Biography ==
Rafael Garcia Serrano was born in Pamplona, Spain in 1917. He studied Philosophy and Letters at the University of Madrid and joined the Spanish Falange, part of the Federación Universitaria Escolar, in January 1934. He was also a founding member of the Spanish University Union (SEU), working with pre-war Falangist publications and writing texts inspired by Ernesto Giménez Caballero, whom he admired.

At the start of the Spanish Civil War, Rafael García Serrano joined the insurgent troops of General Emilio Mola in Pamplona. He held various positions such as journalist, columnist, and director at Falangist publications including Arriba España, Jerarquía, and Arriba (the official publications of the Falange) as well as the 7 Fechas and Pyresa agency (both of which were part of the Falange's Press Chain). In 1953 he went on to become the director of the magazine Haz, the official publication of the Spanish University Union. Furthermore, he also collaborated with the Falangist daily SP directed by Rodrigo Royo, and the far-right newspaper El Alcázar.

Known as a prolific writer, Serrano's works largely focus on the Civil War, a conflict he himself experienced in his youth. He was hospitalised after falling ill with tuberculosis during the Battle of the Ebro and subsequently published "Eugenio o proclamación de la primavera", a work dedicated to Jose Antonio Primo de Rivera, the founder of the Falange. This was followed by "La fiel infantería" which won him the National Novel Prize in 1943, though its publication was later revoked owing to its subjection to religious censorship by the primate archbishop of Toledo. These titles alongside "Plaza del Castillo" form a thematic trilogy which he named "La guerra". The theme of the Civil War remained present in later works such as "Los ojos perdidos", "La paz dura fifteen días" and the acclaimed "Dictionary for a backpack" (Diccionario para un macuto). Serrano also wrote various short stories and travel books.

Serrano won the Espejo de España Prize in 1983 for his memorial work "La gran esperanza" in which he depicted memories of his life from childhood, though his youth, and parts of the Spanish civil war. He is known for his ability to recreate environments, situations and customs, predominantly those in his native Spain from the first third of the 20th century. His writings allow readers to reconstruct daily life during the Spanish Civil War, in addition to the victories of the Francoist side as featured in his Civil War trilogy, "Ópera Carrasclás".

In 1975, García Serrano was elected member of the board of directors of Dyrsa editorial —Diarios y Revistas S.A.—.

He was survived by seven children, including the broadcaster and journalist Eduardo García Serrano, with his wife, Araceli García, having died in 1983 at the age of 54 due to pneumonia. Rafael García Serrano himself died in Madrid in 1988.

== War Novels ==
Serrano's unique literary style has been acknowledged by critics as highly characteristic, combining literary discoveries with a barracks vocabulary to form a 'torn and fighting', 'bronco and castizo' style.

His novel "La fiel infantería" is noteworthy for its pronounced avant-garde features, such as a multiplicity of situations with a non-linear plot and a triple narrative point of view. Expression is concise, condensed, and elliptical, filled with bold metaphors and allusions, sometimes obscure to the military context - echoing Valle-Inclán and Ramón Gómez de la Serna. This work exalts the fraternal spirit of camaraderie and heroism, particularly of those fighting on the frontlines.

Subsequent works, such as "Eugenio o proclamación de la primavera", while adhering to more traditional canons, still feature the common trait of conveying characters proud to pursue a just cause, though possibly not without creating a certain apologia for barbarism. This same piece, combines qualities of idealistic Renaissance poetry with a lack of ideological component.

== Filmography ==
Serrano established a substantial body of work comprising 22 fiction feature films, 9 commercialized documentaries, and 12 television scripts. Included within this cinematographic legacy are: La fiel infantería (1960), which was directed by Pedro Lazaga and not based on a novel of the same name.

Other works include the script of Ronda española (1952), directed by Ladislao Vajda; La patrulla (1954), in which he appeared in as a cameo; The economically weak (1960), directed by Lazaga; The house of the Troy (1959); You and I are three (1961); Boyfriends of death (1975); The sailor with the golden fists (1968); and the legion likes women...and women like the legion (1976), by Rafael Gil.

In 1965, together with José María Sánchez Silva, he co-wrote the script for the documentary Morir en España (1965), directed by Mariano Ozores. He also directed Los ojos perdidos (1966), a film based on his own novel. The film was considered socially controversial due to its portrayal of events from the Civil War, during a period in which Spanish society attempted to move on from the conflict.

== Selected filmography ==
=== Screenwriter ===
- Spanish Serenade (1952)
- College Boarding House (1959)
- The Invincible Gladiator (1961)
- The Sailor with Golden Fists (1968)
- Death's Newlyweds (1975)

=== Director ===
- Lost Eyes (1967)

== Bibliography ==
- Bentley, Bernard. A Companion to Spanish Cinema. Boydell & Brewer 2008.
