= Wings of Youth (1949 film) =

1949 film

- Directed by: Antonio del Amo
- Written by: Manuel Mur Oti; Antonio Pumarola
- Starring: António Vilar; Carlos Muñoz; Fernando Fernán Gómez
- Cinematography: Juan Mariné
- Edited by: Antonio Gimeno
- Music by: Jesús García Leoz
- Production company: Sagitario Films
- Release date: 10 November 1949
- Running time: 85 minutes
- Country: Spain
- Language: Spanish

Wings of Youth (Spanish: Alas de juventud) is a 1949 Spanish drama film directed by Antonio del Amo and starring António Vilar, Carlos Muñoz and Fernando Fernán Gómez. The film's sets were designed by the art director Sigfrido Burmann.

== Synopsis ==
Two cadets of the Spanish Air Force become rivals for the love of their colonel's daughter. However, when disaster strikes during the flight of one of them, the other springs to his rescue.

== Cast ==
- António Vilar as Daniel
- Carlos Muñoz as Luis
- Fernando Fernán Gómez as Rodrigo
- Julio Riscal as Felipe
- Nani Fernández as Elena
- Rina Celi as Emilia
- Tomás Blanco as Capitán Rueda
- Francisco Pierrá as Coronel
- Manuel Aguilera as Lince
- Manuel de Juan as Ventura
- Jacinto San Emeterio as Oficial
- José Nieto

== Bibliography ==
- de España, Rafael. Directory of Spanish and Portuguese film-makers and films. Greenwood Press, 1994.
