= The Great Galeoto =

1951 film

- Directed by: Rafael Gil
- Written by: José Echegaray y Eizaguirre (play); Alfredo Echegaray (play); Rafael Gil; José Antonio Pérez Torreblanca
- Starring: Ana Mariscal; Rafael Durán
- Cinematography: Heinrich Gärtner; Michel Kelber
- Edited by: Intercontinental Films
- Music by: Manuel Parada
- Production company: PROCINES
- Distributed by: As Films
- Release date: 15 October 1951
- Running time: 78 minutes
- Country: Spain
- Language: Spanish

The Great Galeoto (Spanish: El gran Galeoto) is a 1951 Spanish drama film directed by Rafael Gil and starring Ana Mariscal and Rafael Durán.

== Synopsis ==
Ernesto is a young musician who, when his father dies, is forced to stay in Madrid, sharing a house with his executor Julio Villamil, married to the actress Teresa Labisbal, with whom the young man was platonically in love. Although the young man's behavior is impeccable, the rumor created by third parties makes Julio want to fight Ernesto in a duel to the death.

== Cast ==
- Valeriano Andrés as Pedro
- Manuel Arbó as Secretario de Ernesto
- Rafael Bardem as Gabriel
- Francisco Bernal as Peón del coto de caza
- Xan das Bolas as Cochero
- Raúl Cancio as Alcaraz
- María Cañete
- Manuel de Juan as Miembro del consejo
- Mary Delgado as Mercedes
- Rafael Durán as Ernesto Acedo
- Juan Espantaleón as Don Severo Villamil
- Fernando Fernández de Córdoba as Uceda
- Concha Fernández as Castita
- Félix Fernández as Enciso
- Enrique Herreros as Nicasio Heredia de la Escosura
- Casimiro Hurtado as Senén
- Manuel Kayser as Faquir
- José María Lado as Don Julio Villamil
- Julia Lajos
- Helga Liné as Adelina
- Ana Mariscal as Teresa La Bisbal
- Ramón Martori as Don Ángel Acedo
- Nieves Patiño
- Manuel Requena
- Antonio Riquelme
- Santiago Rivero as Moisés
- José Sancho Sterling
- Fernando Sancho as Vizconde de Nebreda
- Vicente Soler as Tomás
- Juanito Vázquez as Marcel
- Ángel Álvarez
- Gabriel Llopart as Actor en la obra
- María Luisa Ponte as Invitada a la cena
- José Prada as Hombre que cura a Don Julio
- José Villasante as Hombre con toga

== Bibliography ==
- de España, Rafael. Directory of Spanish and Portuguese film-makers and films. Greenwood Press, 1994.
