= Shack Out on 101 =

1955 film

- Theatrical release poster
- Directed by: Edward Dein
- Written by: Edward Dein; Mildred Dein
- Produced by: Mort Millman; William F. Broidy (executive producer)
- Starring: Terry Moore; Frank Lovejoy; Keenan Wynn; Lee Marvin
- Cinematography: Floyd Crosby
- Edited by: George White
- Music by: Paul Dunlap
- Production company: William F. Broidy Productions
- Distributed by: Allied Artists Pictures
- Release date: December 4, 1955 (United States)
- Running time: 80 minutes
- Country: United States
- Language: English

Shack Out on 101 is a 1955 American film noir crime film directed by Edward Dein and starring Terry Moore, Frank Lovejoy, Keenan Wynn and Lee Marvin.

== Plot ==
Slob (Marvin), the lecherous short-order cook at the seaside greasy-spoon diner of sarcastic war veteran George (Wynn), lusts after sexy waitress Kotty (Moore). Also interested in Kotty is a scientist (Lovejoy), who spends the better part of his free time at the diner's counter. He works down the highway at a top-secret military base. As it turns out, Slob is not just a short-order cook but also a spy using the diner as a home base for smuggling nuclear secrets out of the country through a connection with one of the diner's regulars.

== Cast ==
- Terry Moore as Kotty
- Frank Lovejoy as Prof. Sam Bastion
- Keenan Wynn as George
- Lee Marvin as Slob / Mr. Gregory
- Whit Bissell as Eddie
- Jess Barker as Artie
- Donald Murphy as Pepe
- Frank DeKova as Prof. Claude Dillon
- Len Lesser as Perch
- Fred Gabourie as Lookout

== See also ==
- List of American films of 1955
