= Loca juventud =

1965 Spanish film directed by Manuel Mur Oti

- Directed by: Manuel Mur Oti
- Release date: 1965
- Running time: 93 minutes
- Countries: Spain; Italy
- Language: Spanish

Loca juventud is a 1965 Spanish and Italian film directed by Manuel Mur Oti.

== Cast ==
- Alberto Alonso
- Io Apolloni
- José María Caffarel
- Carlo Campanini
- Giove Campuzano
- José María Escuer
- Joselito
- Marisa Merlini
- Antonio Moreno
- Joaquín Pamplona
- Luis Prendes
- Jesús Puente
- Emilio Rodríguez
- Ingrid Simon
- María Esther Vázquez
