= María Francés =

Spanish actress (1887–1987)

- Born: María Candelaria Francés García; 2 February 1887; Tudela (Navarra), Spain
- Died: 9 December 1987 (100 years); Barcelona, Spain
- Occupation: Actress
- Years active: 1944-1977 (Film & TV)

María Candelaria Francés García (2 February 1887– 9 December 1987), better known as María Francés, was a Spanish stage, film and television actress.

== Biography ==
She made her debut at the early age of 16 as a chorus girl in zarzuela in Madrid, from where she moved to Bilbao. She played second lead to Carmen Cobeña (grandmother of director Jaime de Armiñán) and married the future manager of the Arriaga Theater in Bilbao, with whom she had six children. In the 1930s, she emigrated to America with Santiago Artigas theater company.

After the end of the Spanish Civil War, he devoted himself to cinema, with notable performances in Surcos by José Antonio Nieves Conde and Viento del norte by José Antonio Nieves Conde, for which he received an honorable mention at the 1st San Sebastián International Film Festival. During the 1960s, he also appeared in televised theater productions on Estudio 1 and Novela, as well as participating in television series such as Las cuatro caras de Eva (The Four Faces of Eve, 1972) and Curro Jiménez(1977).

In 1973, together with fellow actor Xan das Bolas, he received an honorary award from the National Entertainment Union for his film career, retiring from the stage for good four years later, in 1977.

== Filmography ==
Year	Title	Role	Notes
1945	Hombres sin honor	Baronesa de Altas Torres	
1946	Aquel viejo molino		
1947	El ángel gris	Dueña pensión	
1947	Anguish	Sra. Jarque	
1950	The Vila Family	Adela	
1950	La fuente enterrada		
1951	The Black Crown	María	
1951	Furrows	La madre	
1952	Persecution in Madrid	Madre de Diego	
1952	The Song of Sister Maria	Madre Teresa	
1953	Lovers of Toledo	Mujer del pueblo	
1953	Such is Madrid	Vecina	
1953	Flight 971	Mujer enferma	
1953	Pasaporte para un ángel (Órdenes secretas)		
1954	Como la tierra	Madre	
1954	Viento del norte	Herminia	
1955	Pride		
1956	El rey de la carretera		
1957	El genio alegre		
1957	Madrugada	Sabina	
1957	La Cenicienta y Ernesto		
1958	Stories of Madrid	Doña Pilar	
1958	Un indiano en Moratilla		
1958	The Violet Seller		Uncredited
1958	Muchachas en vacaciones	Madre de Carmen	
1959	El frente infinito	Criada	
1959	El niño de las monjas	Madre Superiora	
1960	Juicio final		
1960	La rana verde	Doña Edgarda	
1961	Plácido	Hermana de la Caridad	
1961	Regresa un desconocido	Dueña del hotel	
1961	Sendas cruzadas		
1961	¿Pena de muerte?	Madre de Carlos Castillo	
1961	Al otro lado de la ciudad		
1962	Mentirosa		
1962	The Sadistic Baron von Klaus	Elisa von Klaus	Uncredited
1963	Senda torcida		
1964	A tiro limpio	Sra. Quimeta	
1964	El señor de La Salle	Madre Superiora	
1966	Platero y yo	Macaria	
1967	Another's Wife		
1968	Il marchio di Kriminal	Bertha	
1973	Flor de santidad	Dueña	
1973	Un casto varón español	Doña Celia	
1976	Los viajes escolares	María	

== Bibliography ==
- D'Lugo, Marvin. Guide to the Cinema of Spain. Greenwood Publishing, 1997.
