= Luis Prendes =

Spanish actor (1913–1998)

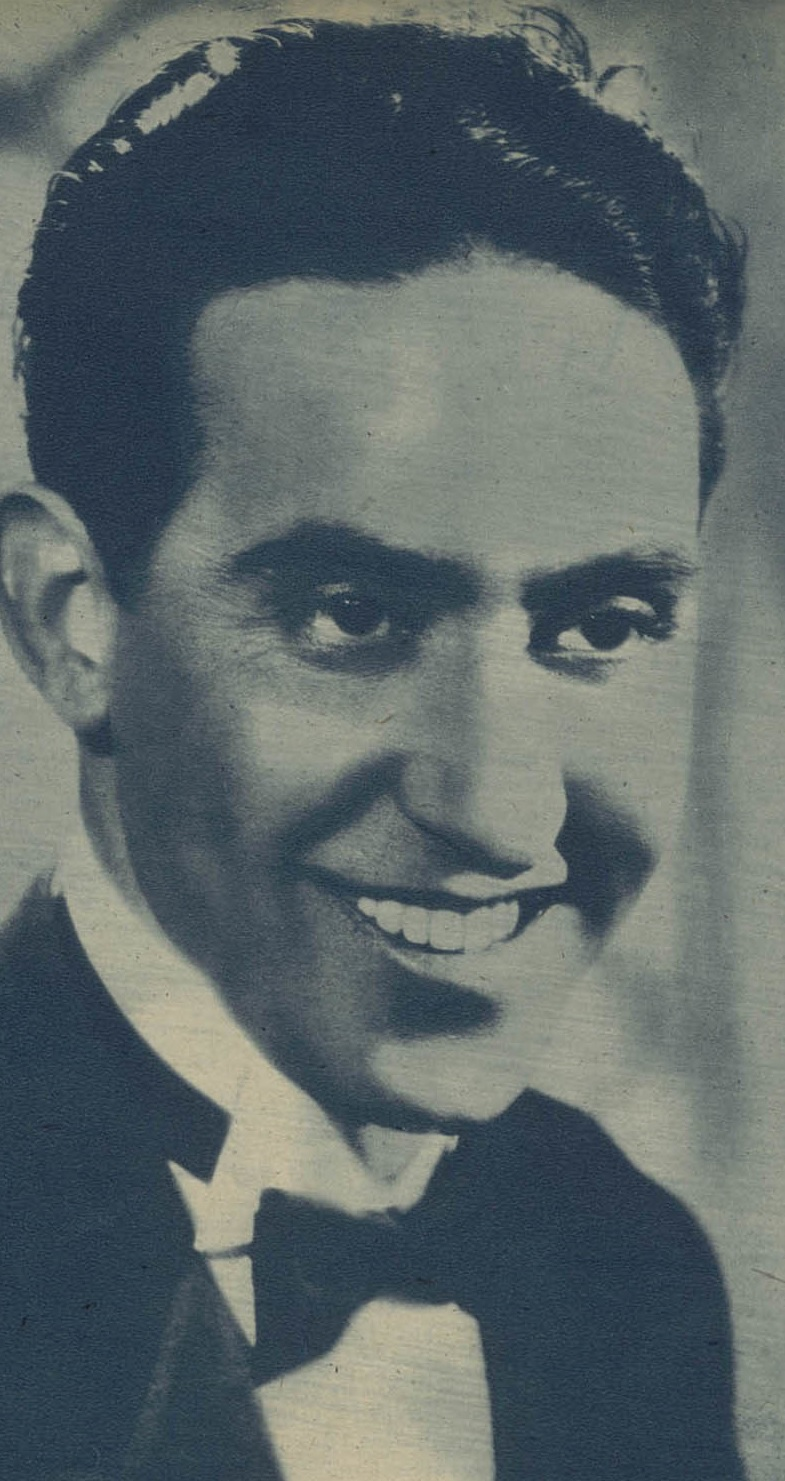
- Born: Luis Prendes Estrada; 22 August 1913; Melilla, Spain
- Died: 27 October 1998 (aged 85); Madrid, Spain
- Resting place: Cementerio de la Almudena
- Occupation: Actor
- Years active: 1936–1998

Luis Prendes Estrada (22 August 1913 – 27 October 1998) was a Spanish actor. He was considered one of the country's most famous movie stars during the 1940s and 1950s. He was also an important figure in the country's theatre.

== Selected filmography ==
- Corner in Madrid (1936) - Mario
- Fortuna (1940)
- Heart of Gold (1941) - Agustín
- Una conquista difícil (1942)
- La madre guapa (1942)
- La culpa del otro (1942) - Juan Carlos
- Su excelencia el mayordomo (1942) - Alfredo
- Melodías prohibidas (1942)
- Boda accidentada (1943) - Nico
- Mi adorable secretaria (1943) - Miguel
- Rosas de otoño (1943)
- Una chica de opereta (1944) - Armando d'Olbés
- Mi enemigo y yo (1944) - Mauricio de Viera
- Lola Montes (1944) - Carlos Benjumea
- Tambor y cascabel (1944)
- Estaba escrito (1945)
- Gentleman Thief (1946) - Jaime Borrell
- Four Women (1947) - enamorado de Elena
- La manigua sin dios (1949)
- Una noche en blanco (1949) - Álvaro
- Cita con mi viejo corazón (1950)
- El duende y el rey (1950)
- La sombra iluminada (1950) - Daniel
- The Seventh Page (1951) - Manolo
- Reckless (1951) - Fernando Mendoza
- Black Sky (1951) - Ricardo Fortuny
- Devil's Roundup (1952) - Buhonero
- The Devil Plays the Flute (1953) - Bernaldino
- Condemned to Hang (1953) - Tomás
- Luces de candilejas (1956)
- Dos basuras (1958)
- Venta de Vargas (1959) - Comandante De Moulin
- Back to the Door (1959) - Enrique Simón
- El precio de la sangre (1960)
- El príncipe encadenado (1960)
- Ursus (1961) - Setas
- King of Kings (1961) - as Dismas, the Penitent Thief
- Kill and Be Killed (1962) - Inspector Muñoz
- Todos eran culpables (1962)
- Plaza de oriente (1963) - Gabriel Ardanaz
- Carta a una mujer (1963) - Augusto
- Los muertos no perdonan (1963) - Pablo Laínez
- Pyro... The Thing Without a Face (1964) - Police Inspector
- La hora incógnita (1964) - Policía
- Loca juventud (1965) - Carlos Durán, padre de Johnny
- 100.000 dollari per Lassiter (1966) - Mack (uncredited)
- Seven Vengeful Women (1966) - Pope
- Fantasia 3 (1966) - Mago de Oz (segment "El mago de Oz")
- El fantástico mundo del doctor Coppelius (1966) - The Mayor
- Django Does Not Forgive (1966)
- El hombre que mató a Billy el Niño (1967) - John Tunstill
- El dedo del destino (1967) - Winkle
- The Christmas Kid (1967) - Judge George Perkins
- Un homme à abattre (1967) - Julius
- White Comanche (1968) - Grimes
- La banda del Pecas (1968) - Padre de Marina
- Investigación criminal (1970) - Inspector Basilio Lérida
- Chino (1973) - (uncredited)
- Un hombre como los demás (1974)
- Hay que matar a B. (1974) - Commisary
- Breakout (1975) - Juez (uncredited)
- El juego del diablo (1975) - Alcalde / Town Mayor
- Secuestro (1976) - Óscar
- Cazar un gato negro (1977) - Doctor
- China 9, Liberty 37 (1978) - Williams
- Jaguar Lives! (1979) - Habish
- Tuareg – The Desert Warrior (1984) - Abdul El Kabir
- Memorias del general Escobar (1984) - General Aranguren
- Alfonso X y el Reino de Murcia (1985) - Alfonso X
- The Falling (1986) - Dr. W. Tracer, NASA
- La Gran Fiesta (1986) - Don Manuel González
- Loco veneno (1989) - Sr. Sadurny
- Atilano, presidente (1998) - Don Aníbal
