= Orosia (film) =

- Directed by: Florián Rey
- Written by: Manuel Soriano (play); Manuel Bolaños (play); Florián Rey
- Starring: Blanca de Silos; José Nieto; Nicolás D. Perchicot
- Cinematography: Heinrich Gärtner
- Edited by: Antonio Cánovas
- Production company: Iberia Films
- Distributed by: Iberia Films
- Release date: 31 January 1944
- Running time: 77 minutes
- Country: Spain
- Language: Spanish

Orosia is a 1944 Spanish drama film directed by Florián Rey and starring Blanca de Silos, José Nieto and Nicolás D. Perchicot.

== Synopsis ==
The story begins in 1900 with the imminent wedding between Orosia Garcés de Abarca and Eloy Sancho de Embún. But her happiness will be cut short when the future husband is stabbed to death as a result of the rivalries of the nightly serenades before the bride's balcony. The neighbors suspect the quarrelsome Venancio and Joselón de Urríes, a former suitor of Orosia.

== Cast ==
- Blanca de Silos as Orosia
- José Nieto as Joselón
- Nicolás D. Perchicot as Don Pablo
- María Brú as Sabel
- Delfín Jerez as Gracián
- José Sepúlveda as Venancio
- José Isbert as Don Cándido
- Ángel Belloc as Eloy
- Mariana Larrabeiti as Jacinta
- Julia Lajos as Rosa
- Antonia Plana as Doña Clara
- Salvador Videgain as judge Don Alonso
- Luis Pérez de León as Calixto
- Ana María Quijada as Remigia
- Ana de Leyva as Blasa
- Luis Villasiul as Don Valentín
- Lolita Valcárcel as Vicenta
- Fernando Sancho as Mañico bronquista

== Bibliography ==
- Bentley, Bernard. A Companion to Spanish Cinema. Boydell & Brewer 2008.
