= Laurie Mitchell =

American actress (1928–2018)

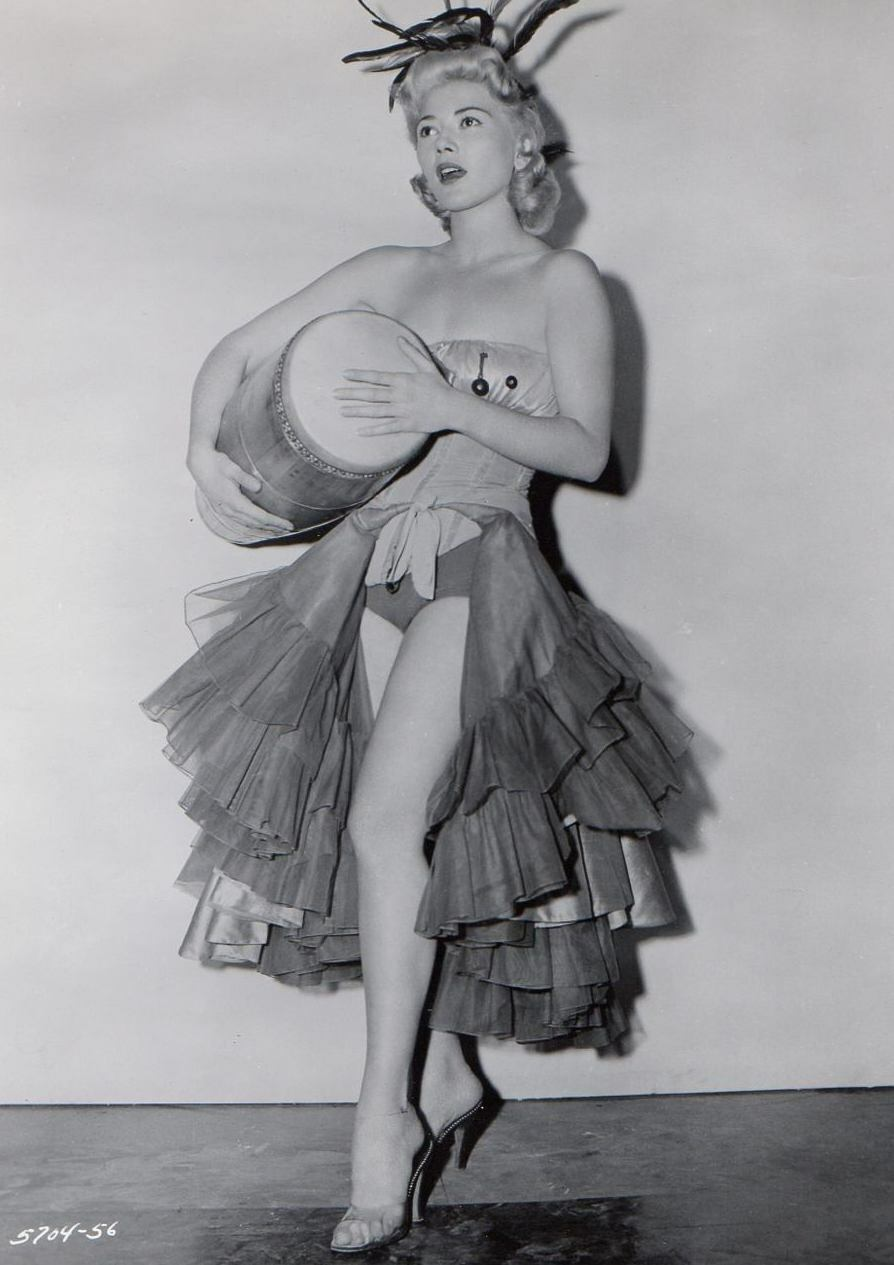
- Mitchell in Calypso Joe (1957)
- Born: Mickey Koren; July 14, 1928; Manhattan, New York, U.S.
- Died: September 20, 2018 (aged 90); Perris, California, U.S.
- Resting place: Mount Sinai Memorial Park Cemetery
- Occupations: Actress, model
- Years active: 1954–1972
- Spouses: Larry White (m. 1949; div. 1976): Ron Roberts

Laurie Mitchell (born Mickey Koren; July 14, 1928 – September 20, 2018) was an American actress and model. Mitchell was perhaps best known for her role as Queen Yllana, the ruler of Venus, in Edward Bernds's 1958 science-fiction film Queen of Outer Space.

== Early life ==
Mitchell was born in Manhattan on July 14, 1928. Her parents were Samuel and Adele Koren. She began her career in The Bronx where she was a child model. Her family moved to Los Angeles when Mitchell was in her teens.

== Career ==
In 1954, she made her acting debut as a hooker opposite Kirk Douglas in 20,000 Leagues Under the Sea. She also appeared on television for the first time in an installment of Ford Television Theatre. She garnered a degree of fame in her role alongside Zsa Zsa Gabor in the 1958 science-fiction film Queen of Outer Space.

Mitchell has co-starring roles in the feature films Calypso Joe (1957) and That Touch of Mink (1962). She can also be seen in episodes of various American television series produced in the 1950s and 1960s, such as the Adventures of Superman, 77 Sunset Strip, Wanted: Dead or Alive playing Belle Colter in S2 E15 "Chain Gang" (1959), Hawaiian Eye, Perry Mason, Bonanza, The Alfred Hitchcock Hour, The Addams Family, and The Virginian.

== Personal life and death ==
In 1949, aged 21, Mitchell married magician Larry White. They had two children and divorced in 1976. Mitchell later remarried and had two stepsons. She died of natural causes in 2018, at age 90, in Perris, California, and was buried in Mount Sinai Memorial Park Cemetery.

== Filmography ==
Year	Title	Role	Notes
1954	20,000 Leagues Under the Sea	Ned's Girlfriend #2	Uncredited
1955	Women's Prison	Inmate	Uncredited
1956	The Rawhide Years	Minor Role	Uncredited
1956	Girls in Prison	Phyllis - Tall Blonde	
1956	Fighting Trouble	Dolly Tate	
1957	The Garment Jungle	Model	Uncredited
1957	The Oklahoman	Girl	Uncredited
1957	Colt .45 (TV series)	Adele	season 1 episode 3 (The $3000 Bullet)
1957	Calypso Joe	Leah	
1957	The Helen Morgan Story	Minor Role	Uncredited
1958	The Female Animal	Manicurist	Uncredited
1958	Attack of the Puppet People	Georgia Lane	
1958	Queen of Outer Space	Queen Yllana	
1958	Missile to the Moon	Lambda	
1959	Some Like It Hot	Mary Lou	Uncredited
1959	Wanted Dead or Alive (TV series)	Belle Colter	season 2 episode 15 (Chain gang)
1960	Hell Bent for Leather	Girl Friend	Uncredited
1961	Perry Mason	Madge Elwood	Episode: "The Case of the Waylaid Wolf"
1961	Rawhide	Rosette	S4:E8, "The Prairie Elephant"
1962	That Touch of Mink	Showgirl	
1963	A New Kind of Love	Parisienne Poule	Uncredited
1963	Gunfight at Comanche Creek	Tina Neville	
1964	Gomer Pyle USMC	Bernice	S1E12 (Sergeant Carter, Marine Babysitter)
1965	Runaway Girl	Winnie Bernay	
1966	Lord Love a Duck	Jack's Wife	(scenes deleted)
1968	The Virginian (TV series)	Louise	season 7 episode 13 (Big Tiny)
1969	The Girl Who Knew Too Much	Trudell	
