= Nani Fernández =

Spanish actress

- Born: Juana Fernández Ruiz; 22 February 1923; Madrid, Spain
- Died: 9 November 1960 (aged 37); Madrid, Spain
- Occupation: Actress
- Years active: 1945-1960
- Spouse: José Nieto
- Children: 2

Juana "Nani" Fernández Ruiz (22 February 1923 – 9 November 1960) was a Spanish film actress.

== Selected filmography ==
- Lola Leaves for the Ports (1947)
- Ninety Minutes (1949)
- Wings of Youth (1949)
- A Tale of Two Villages (1951)
- The Song of Sister Maria (1952)
- An Impossible Crime (1954)
- Last Stand in the Philippines (1955)
- The Lost City (1955)
- The Legion of Silence (1956)
- The Cat (1956)

== Bibliography ==
- Pepe Coira. Antonio Román: un cineasta de la posguerra. Editorial Complutense, 2004.
