= Adventures of Juan Lucas =

1949 film by Rafael Gil

- Directed by: Rafael Gil
- Written by: Manuel Halcón (novel); Rafael Gil
- Starring: Fernando Rey; Marie Déa; Manolo Morán
- Cinematography: Cecilio Paniagua
- Edited by: José Antonio Rojo
- Music by: Juan Quintero
- Production company: Suevia Films
- Distributed by: Suevia Films
- Release date: 29 December 1949
- Running time: 92 minutes
- Country: Spain
- Language: Spanish

Adventures of Juan Lucas (Spanish: Aventuras de Juan Lucas) is a 1949 Spanish historical adventure film directed by Rafael Gil and starring Fernando Rey, Marie Déa and Manolo Morán. It consists of an adaptation of the Manuel Halcón's eponymous novel. The film's sets were designed by the art director Enrique Alarcón.

== Synopsis ==
Juan Lucas, a famous highwaymen in the Sierra Morena mountains in southern Spain, joins the guerrilla war following the French invasion of Spain during the Napoleonic Wars.

== Cast ==
- Fernando Rey as Juan Lucas
- Marie Déa as Ana Romero de los Viejos
- Manolo Morán as Chano
- Juan Espantaleón as D. Martín Romero de los Viejos
- Julia Caba Alba as Curandera
- Rafael Calvo
- Manuel Dicenta
- Ricardo Acero
- Fernando Fernández de Córdoba
- Mary Carmen Macía
- Manuel Kayser
- Joaquín Roa as Telescopio
- Ramón Elías
- Manuel Arbó
- José Prada
- Jacinto San Emeterio
- Manuel Requena
- José Franco
- Rufino Inglés
- Casimiro Hurtado as Traidor
- Leandro Alpuente
- Manuel San Román
- Enrique Herreros
- José Nieto

== Bibliography ==
- Eva Woods Peiró. White Gypsies: Race and Stardom in Spanish Musical Films. U of Minnesota Press, 2012.
