= Mildred Dein =

American screenwriter

- Born: Mildred Gilrod; November 8, 1911; New York, USA
- Died: September 5, 1997 (aged 85); Encino, California, USA
- Occupation: Screenwriter
- Spouse: Edward Dein

Mildred Dein (born Mildred Gilrod) was an American screenwriter who worked primarily on genre films during 1950s.

== Biography ==
Born in New York to Jewish immigrants from Russia and Germany, she married writer-director Edward Dein in Los Angeles in 1934, and the pair would go on to collaborate on half a dozen films over the next 20 years. The pair also wrote books like 1947's The Pencil Is Sharp together. For years, they resided in a castle-like home in Los Angeles's Laurel Canyon.

== Selected filmography ==
- Curse of the Undead (1959)
- Seven Guns to Mesa (1958)
- Calypso Joe (1957)
- Shack Out on 101 (1955)
- The Heart and the Sword (1953)
- Come Die My Love (1952)
