= Michel Kelber =

French cinematographer

- Born: April 9, 1908; Kyiv, Russian Empire
- Died: 23 October 1996 (aged 88); Paris, France
- Occupation: Cinematographer
- Years active: 1928-1993 (film)

Michel Kelber (9 April 1908 – 23 October 1996) was a French cinematographer. Beginning in the late 1920s, he worked on more than a hundred film productions during a lengthy career. Born in Kyiv, then part of the Russian Empire, he studied art and architecture in Paris. He started worked as an assistant cameraman in 1928, before progressing to cinematographer four years later. He worked with leading directors such as Jean Renoir, René Clair, Julien Duvivier and Claude Autant-Lara. He also worked for periods in Spain, including during the wartime German occupation of France.

== Selected filmography ==
- The Concierge's Daughters (1934)
- Gold in the Street (1934)
- Zouzou (1934)
- School for Coquettes (1935)
- Baccara (1935)
- The Scandalous Couple (1935)
- Beautiful Days (1935)
- La Vie parisienne (1936)
- Adventure in Paris (1936)
- Forty Little Mothers (1936)
- Under Western Eyes (1936)
- Life Dances On (1937)
- The Courier of Lyon (1937)
- I Was an Adventuress (1938)
- Rasputin (1938)
- Hercule (1938)
- The Gutter (1938)
- White Nights in Saint Petersburg (1938)
- Final Accord (1938)
- Girls in Distress (1939)
- Personal Column (1939)
- Savage Brigade (1939)
- The White Slave (1939)
- Thunder Over Paris (1940)
- Goyescas (1942)
- Intrigue (1942)
- The Scandal (1943)
- House of Cards (1943)
- Lola Montes (1944)
- The Phantom and Dona Juanita (1945)
- Bamboo (1945)
- White Mission (1946)
- Pétrus (1946)
- Ruy Blas (1948)
- Confidences (1948)
- Les Parents terribles (1948)
- The Nude Woman (1949)
- Saturday Night (1950)
- The Straw Lover (1951)
- The Great Galeoto (1951)
- Love and Desire (1951)
- Our Lady of Fatima (1951)
- From Madrid to Heaven (1952)
- Feather in the Wind (1952)
- Lovers of Toledo (1953)
- The Lovers of Midnight (1953)
- Nobody Will Know (1953)
- The Beautiful Otero (1954)
- The Red and the Black (1954)
- French Cancan (1955)
- Sophie and the Crime (1955)
- The Hunchback of Notre Dame (1956)
- Calle Mayor (1956)
- The Ambassador's Daughter (1956)
- Lovers of Paris (1957)
- Magnificent Sinner (1959)
- College Boarding House (1959)
- John Paul Jones (1959)
- Litri and His Shadow (1960)
- Jack of Spades (1960)
- Bombs on Monte Carlo (1960)
- The Nina B. Affair (1961)
- Rogelia (1962)
- A View from the Bridge (1962)
- Good Luck, Charlie (1962)
- In the French Style (1963)
- Mata Hari, Agent H21 (1964)
- Nights of Farewell (1965)
- A Woman in White (1965)
- Johnny Banco (1967)
- The Story of a Three-Day Pass (1968)
- Blood in the Bullring (1969)
- The Lonely Woman (1973)

== Bibliography ==
- Larry Langman. Destination Hollywood: The Influence of Europeans on American Filmmaking. McFarland, 2000.
