= Come Die My Love =

1952 film by Edward Dein and Luis Marquina

- Directed by: Edward Dein; Luis Marquina
- Written by: Edward Dein; Mildred Dein; Luis Marquina
- Starring: Honor Blackman; José Bódalo; Gérard Tichy
- Cinematography: José F. Aguayo
- Edited by: Magdalena Pulido
- Music by: Jesús García Leoz
- Production company: Hesperia Films
- Distributed by: Mercurio Films
- Release date: 1952
- Running time: 80 minutes
- Countries: Spain; United Kingdom
- Language: Spanish

Come Die My Love (Spanish: Manchas de sangre en la luna) is a 1952 Spanish-British drama film directed by Edward Dein and Luis Marquina and starring Honor Blackman, José Bódalo and Gérard Tichy. It was partly shot in Tangier in Spanish Morocco.

== Cast ==
- Honor Blackman as Eva
- José Bódalo as Eddie
- Gérard Tichy as Bill
- Francisco Viñals as padre Carmelo
- Matilde Artero
- Félix Fernández
- Manuel Guitián
- Tony Hernández
- Lolita Moreno
- Miguel Pastor
- Carmen Tarrazo

== Bibliography ==
- de España, Rafael. Directory of Spanish and Portuguese film-makers and films. Greenwood Press, 1994.
