= Amaya (1952 film) =

1952 film

- Directed by: Luis Marquina
- Written by: Jesús Azcarreta; Luis Marquina
- Based on: Amaya by Francisco Navarro Villoslada
- Starring: Susana Canales; Julio Peña; José Bódalo
- Cinematography: Heinrich Gärtner; José F. Aguayo
- Edited by: Magdalena Pulido
- Production company: Producciones Cinematográficas Hudesa
- Distributed by: CIFESA
- Release date: 7 October 1952
- Running time: 110 minutes
- Country: Spain
- Language: Spanish

Amaya is a 1952 Spanish historical drama film directed by Luis Marquina and starring Susana Canales, Julio Peña and José Bódalo. The film's sets were designed by the art director Luis Pérez Espinosa.

An adaptation of Francisco Navarro Villoslada's historical novel Amaya o los vascos en el siglo VIII, Marquina's version features a visceral judeophobia amplified from the original work, which pushes a conspiracy narrative attributing the "711 loss of Spain" to a Jewish plot. The film's antisemitic sentiment is strongly displayed in sequences such as those involving the uprising of the Pamplona's jewry, and the imprisoning of Basque Christians.

== Cast ==
- Susana Canales as Amaya
- Julio Peña as Íñigo García
- José Bódalo as Teodosio
- Pedro Porcel as Vladimiro
- Porfiria Sanchíz as Amagoys
- Ramón Elías as Hermano Paconio
- Francisco Pierrá as Miguel de Goñi
- Rafael Luis Calvo as Eudonio
- Eugenia Zúffoli as Constanza
- Armando Moreno as Capitán Munio
- Manuel Aguilera as Ausonio
- Rafael Arcos as Pelayo
- Arturo Marín as Asben
- Manolo Morán as Saturnino Aizcur
- Miguel Pastor as Anatolio
- Mónica Pastrana as Olaya
- Santiago Rivero as Echeverría
- Luisa Rodrigo as Petronila

== Bibliography ==
- Goble, Alan (1999). The Complete Index to Literary Sources in Film. Walter de Gruyter, Bowker-Saur. ISBN 978-1-85739-229-6 – via Internet Archive.
- Oliete-Aldea, Elena; Oria, Beatriz; Tarancón, Juan A. (2015-12-17). Global Genres, Local Films: The Transnational Dimension of Spanish Cinema. Bloomsbury Publishing USA. ISBN 978-1-5013-0300-5.
