= Doña Francisquita (film) =

1952 film

- Directed by: Ladislao Vajda
- Written by: José Luis Colina; Guillermo Fernández Shaw; Federico Romero; José Santugini; Ladislao Vajda
- Produced by: Miguel Tudela
- Starring: Mirtha Legrand
- Cinematography: Antonio L. Ballesteros
- Edited by: Julio Peña; Antonio Ramírez de Loaysa
- Release date: 1952
- Running time: 88 minutes
- Country: Spain
- Language: Spanish

Doña Francisquita is a 1952 Spanish musical comedy film directed by Ladislao Vajda. It was entered into the 1953 Cannes Film Festival.

== Plot ==
Francisquita secretly loves Fernando, but he has fallen in love with Aurora, a purebred Madrid woman used to flirting with all men. Cardona, a friend of Fernando's, decides to help Francisquita, even at the risk of confusing everything.

== Cast ==
- Mirtha Legrand as Doña Francisquita
- Armando Calvo as Fernando
- Antonio Casal as Cardona
- Manolo Morán as Lorenzo
- Emma Penella as Aurora 'La Beltrana'
- Julia Lajos as Doña Francisca
- José Isbert as Maestro Lambertini
- Jesús Tordesillas as Don Matías
- Ángel Álvarez as Un señor (uncredited)
- Antonio Riquelme as Pepe (uncredited)
