= Last Stand in the Philippines =

1945 Spanish war film directed by Antonio Román

- Directed by: Antonio Román
- Written by: Pedro de Juan; Antonio Román
- Starring: Armando Calvo; José Nieto; Fernando Rey; Guillermo Marín; Manolo Morán; Conrado San Martín; Tony Leblanc; Nani Fernández
- Cinematography: Heinrich Gärtner
- Edited by: Bienvenida Sanz
- Music by: Manuel Parada
- Release date: 1945
- Running time: 99 minutes
- Country: Spain
- Language: Spanish

Last Stand in the Philippines (Spanish: Los últimos de Filipinas) is a 1945 Spanish biographical war film directed by Antonio Román. It is based on a radio script by Enrique Llovet, Los Héroes de Baler, and novel, El Fuerte de Baler, by Enrique Alfonso Barcones and Rafael Sánchez Campoy.

The movie theme song "Yo te diré", composed by Llovet (lyrics) and Jorge Halpern (music), became very popular. It was lip synced by actress Nani Fernández and sung by Maria Teresa Valcárcel.

== Background ==
"The Last Ones of the Philippines" is the name given to the Spanish soldiers who fought in the Siege of Baler against Filipino revolutionaries and against the US Army during the Spanish–American War (in Spain also called "The Disaster of 98").

The siege of Baler lasted from 1 July 1898 to 2 June 1899. During these 11 months, the Spaniards were isolated in a church that became their fortified position. The Spanish troops were a small garrison of 50 soldiers from the "2º de Cazadores" under the charge of Lieutenant D. Juan Alonso Zayas. They faced approximately 800 rebel soldiers. The Spanish soldiers fortified the church and resisted the constant attacks of the rebels for 11 months without provisions and unknowing that the war had ended in December 1898.

== Cast ==
- Armando Calvo as Teniente Martín Cerezo
- José Nieto as Capitán Enrique de las Morenas
- Guillermo Marín as Doctor Rogelio Vigil
- Manolo Morán as Pedro Vila
- Juan Calvo as Cabo Olivares
- Fernando Rey as Juan Chamizo
- Manuel Kayser as Fray Cándido
- Carlos Muñoz as Santamaría
- José Miguel Rupert as Moisés
- Pablo Álvarez Rubio as Herrero, el desertor
- Nani Fernández as Tala
- Emilio Ruiz de Córdoba as El Correo
- César Guzmán as Jesús García Quijano
- Alfonso de Horna as Marquiado
- Manuel Arbó as Gómez Ortiz
- Tony Leblanc as military courier, in his first role with dialogue in a film

== See also ==
- Baler - A 2008 Philippine film.
- 1898, Our Last Men in the Philippines - A 2016 Spanish film.
