= Susana Canales =

Spanish film and television actress (1933–2021)

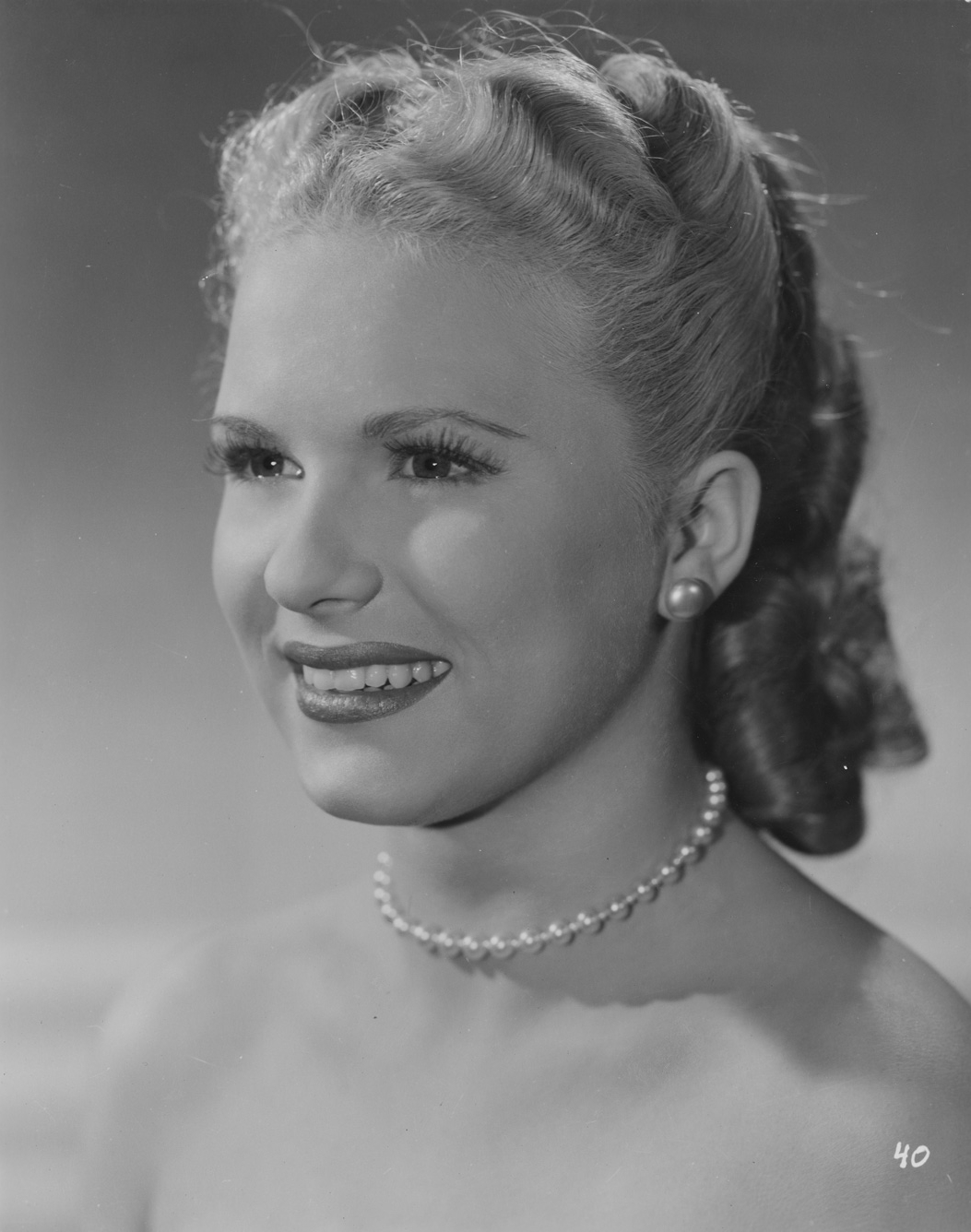
- Susana Canales in Un pecado por mes (1949)
- Born: 5 September 1933; Madrid, Spain
- Died: 22 March 2021 (aged 87); Madrid, Spain
- Occupation: Actress
- Years active: 1942–1995
- Spouse: Julio Peña (m. 1953; died 1972)

Susana Canales Niaucel (5 September 1933 – 22 March 2021) was a Spanish film and television actress. Initially a child actor she switched to playing grown-up parts in the early 1950s. She starred in the 1951 drama Black Sky (1951).

Canales died on 22 March 2021 in her hometown, Madrid, at the age of 87.

== Selected filmography ==
- White Horse Inn (1948)
- Black Sky (1951)
- Amaya (1952)
- Such is Madrid (1953)
- The Adventures of Gil Blas (1956)
- Return to the Truth (1956)
- Count Max (1957)
- John Paul Jones (1959)
- Revolt of the Mercenaries (1961)
