= Spanish Serenade =

1952 film by Ladislao Vajda

- Directed by: Ladislao Vajda
- Written by: Rafael García Serrano; José María Sánchez Silva
- Produced by: Ramón Plana
- Starring: José Isbert; Manolo Morán
- Cinematography: Theodore J. Pahle
- Edited by: Antonio Martínez
- Music by: Jesús García Leoz
- Production company: Chamartín
- Distributed by: Chamartín
- Release date: 14 January 1952
- Running time: 91 minutes
- Country: Spain
- Language: Spanish

Spanish Serenade (Spanish: Ronda española) is a 1952 Spanish musical film directed by Ladislao Vajda, and starring José Isbert and Manolo Morán. The film was a success on its release.

== Plot ==
Many women from the Women's Section of the Falange in the 50's went to America by boat to show the folklore of Spain in all their countries. The show was an entertainment for the émigrés who were on the other side of the Atlantic. The women left their homes and embarked on "Mount Albertia". On the boat trip, the relationship between all the crew members was the most fun, although many of them longed for their place of origin. Wherever they go, luck is on their side.

== Cast ==
- Manuel Aguilera as Tipo 1º
- Margarita Alexandre as Diana
- Ramón Baillo as Repartidor de telégrafos
- Barta Barri as Jefe de los saboteadores
- Félix Briones as Capitán 2º
- Beni Deus
- Adriano Dominguez as Andrés
- Luciano Díaz as Chato
- Miguel Ángel Fernandez
- Fernando Heiko Vassel as Teniente en Curaçao
- Casimiro Hurtado as Tipo 2º
- José Isbert as Capitán del barco
- Carolina Jiménez as Mercedes
- Milagros Leal as Lola
- Julia Martínez as Rosita
- Alejandro Millán as Oficial 2º
- Manolo Morán as Morgan
- Joaquin Musulen as Mariano
- María Esperanza Navarro as Ana
- Clotilde Poderós as Victoria
- Elvira Quintillá as Magdalena
- Enrique Ramírez as Misionero
- José Riesgo as Agregado
- Santiago Rivero as Tipo 3º
- José María Rodero as Juan
- Gerardo Rodríguez as Capellán
- Alfonso Rojas as Capitán 2º
- Emilio Ruiz de Córdoba as Capitán 3º
- Elena Salvador as Ángeles
- Juana Sebastian as Luisa
- José Suárez as Pablo
- Roberto Zara as Giulio

== Bibliography ==
- Bentley, Bernard. A Companion to Spanish Cinema. Boydell & Brewer 2008.
