= Manuel Mur Oti =

Spanish film director (1908–2003)

- Born: Manuel Mur Oti; 25 October 1908; Vigo (Pontevedra), Spain
- Died: 5 August 2003 (aged 94); Madrid, Spain
- Other name: Juan Lladó Bausili
- Occupations: Writer, Director
- Years active: 1947-1979

Manuel Mur Oti (25 October 1908 – 5 August 2003) was a Spanish screenwriter and film director. He also acted in one film, the neorealist Segundo López (1953).

== Selected filmography ==
- Four Women (1947)
- Guest of Darkness (1948)
- Ninety Minutes (1949)
- Wings of Youth (1949)
- A Man on the Road (1949)
- Black Sky (1951)
- Segundo López (1953)
- Condemned (1953)
- Pride (1955)
- Fedra (1956)
- The Battalion in the Shadows (1957)
- A Girl from Chicago (1960)
- Kill and Be Killed (1962)
- Loca juventud (1965)

== Bibliography ==
- Bentley, Bernard. A Companion to Spanish Cinema. Boydell & Brewer 2008. ISBN 978-1-85566-176-9.
