= Bienvenida Sanz =

Spanish film editor

- Occupation: Film editor

Bienvenida Sanz was a Spanish film editor active in the 1940s and 1950s.

== Selected filmography ==
- La belle de Cadix (1953)
- Noventa minutos (1949)
- Loyola, the Soldier Saint (1949)
- Doña María the Brave (1948)
- Cuatro mujeres (1947)
- La nao Capitana (1947)
- The Crime of Bordadores Street (1946)
- Los últimos de Filipinas (1945)
- Canelita en rama (1943)
- El huésped del sevillano (1940)
