= Blanca de Silos =

Spanish actress

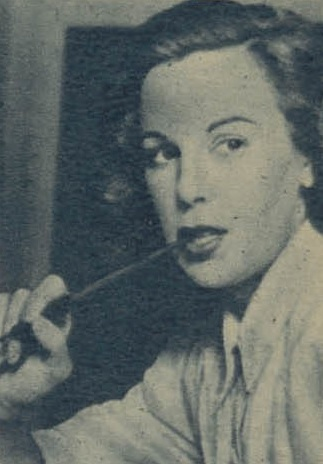
- Blanca de Silos in 1944.
- Born: 2 August 1914; Vitoria, Basque Country; Spain
- Died: 13 September 2002 (aged 88); Segovia, Spain
- Other name: Blanca Silos López de la Calle
- Occupation: Actress
- Years active: 1939-1967 (film)

Blanca de Silos (2 August 1914 – 13 September 2002) was a Spanish film actress. She appeared in fifteen films, including playing the title role in Mariona Rebull (1947).

== Selected filmography ==
- Raza (1942)
- Intrigue (1942)
- House of Cards (1943)
- The House of Rain (1943)
- Orosia (1944)
- Mariona Rebull (1947)
- Monsieur Robinson Crusoe (1960)

== Bibliography ==
- Helio San Miguel, Lorenzo J. Torres Hortelano. World Film Locations: Barcelona. Intellect Books, 2013.
