= Rivilla de Barajas =

- municipality
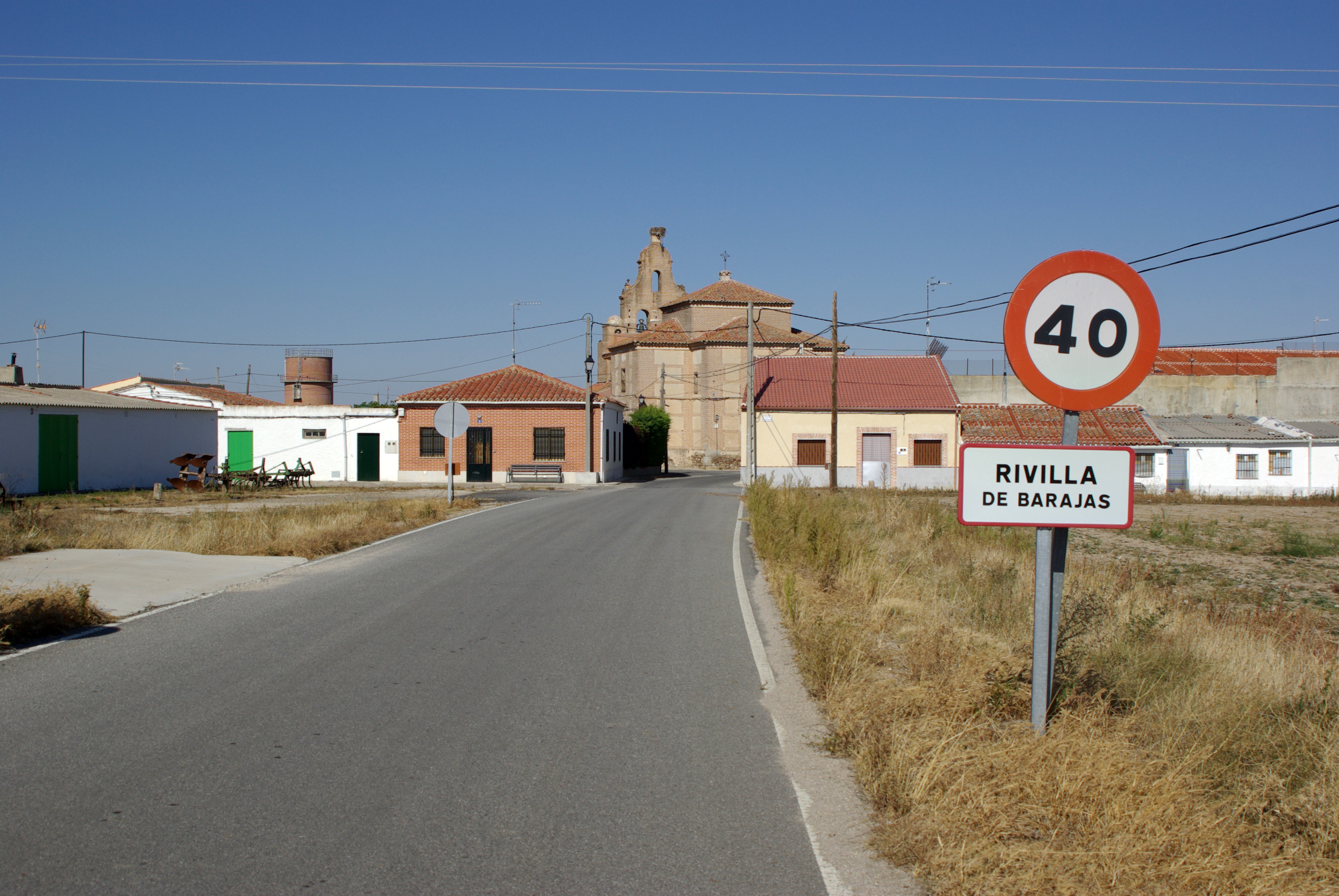
- Flag Coat of arms
- Location in Spain. Rivilla de Barajas (Spain)
- Coordinates: 40°54′07″N 4°59′17″W
- Country: Spain
- Autonomous community: Castile and León
- Province: Ávila
- Municipality: Rivilla de Barajas

Area
  - Total: 24 km^{2} (9.3 sq mi)

Population (2025-01-01)
  - Total: 59
  - Density: 2.5/km^{2} (6.4/sq mi)
- Time zone: UTC+1 (CET)
  - Summer (DST): UTC+2 (CEST)
- Website: Official website

Rivilla de Barajas is a municipality located in the province of Ávila, Castile and León, Spain.

== Population ==
Historical population
Year	Pop.	±% p.a.
2023	62	—
2024	56	−9.68%
2025	59	+5.36%
Source: INE
