= Pablo Muñiz =

Uruguayan footballer (born 1977)

Pablo Muñiz Larrosa (born 16 August 1977 in Montevideo) is a Uruguayan footballer who plays as a defender. He currently plays for Atenas de San Carlos.

Muñiz's career began when he signed a professional contract with Defensor Sporting in 1996, making his first-team debut in 1997 aged 20.

== Teams ==
- (Uruguay) Defensor Sporting 1997-1999
- (Uruguay) Sud América 2000-2005
- (Uruguay) Rentistas 2006-2007
- (Uruguay) Progreso 2007-2009
- (Uruguay) Atenas 2009–present
