= Mariona Rebull (film) =

- Directed by: José Luis Sáenz de Heredia
- Written by: Ignasi Agustí (novel); José Luis Sáenz de Heredia
- Starring: José María Seoane; Blanca de Silos; Sara Montiel; Alberto Romea
- Cinematography: Alfred Gilks
- Edited by: Julio Peña
- Music by: Manuel Parada
- Production company: Estudios Ballesteros
- Distributed by: Cibeles Film
- Release date: 14 April 1947
- Running time: 110 minutes
- Country: Spain
- Language: Spanish

Mariona Rebull is a 1947 Spanish historical drama film directed by José Luis Sáenz de Heredia and starring José María Seoane, Blanca de Silos and Sara Montiel. The film is an adaptation of the 1943 novel of the same title by Ignasi Agustí. The film is set amongst the high society of late nineteenth century Barcelona. Mariona Rebull is unhappily married, and begins an affair. She is eventually killed on 7 November 1893 when an anarchist Santiago Salvador throws a bomb into the stalls of the Gran Teatre del Liceu, Barcelona's opera house. This was based on a real-life incident.

== Plot ==
Set in Barcelona at the end of the nineteenth century, the film follows Mariona Rebull, a woman from the city's upper class who is trapped in an unhappy marriage. Although her comfortable surroundings give the appearance of a privileged life, Mariona becomes increasingly dissatisfied with her relationship and begins an affair. Her personal life unfolds against a period of growing social and political unrest in Barcelona. The story culminates on 7 November 1893, when Mariona attends a performance at the Gran Teatre del Liceu. During the performance, anarchist Santiago Salvador throws a bomb into the audience. Mariona is among those killed in the attack.

== Cast ==
- José María Seoane as Joaquín Rius
- Blanca de Silos as Mariona Rebull
- Sara Montiel as Lula
- Alberto Romea as Señor Llobet
- Tomás Blanco as Ernesto Villar
- Carlos Muñoz as Arturo
- José María Lado
- Adolfo Marsillach as Darío
- Fernando Sancho as Señor Roig
- Rafael Bardem as Señor Llopis
- Mario Berriatúa as Desiderio
- Manrique Gil as Señor Pàmies
- Ramón Martori
- Cándida Suarez
- Rosita Yarza
- Carolina Giménez as Muchacha en El Liceo

== Bibliography ==
- Helio San Miguel, Lorenzo J. Torres Hortelano. World Film Locations: Barcelona. Intellect Books, 2013.
