= Jesús García Leoz =

Spanish composer (1904–1953)

Jesús García Leoz (Olite, Navarra, 10 January 1904 – 1953) was a Spanish composer, particularly noted for his film scores. He was a favourite pupil of Joaquín Turina and one of the "músicos del '27."

== Works, editions and recordings ==
- Cinco canciones para canto e piano (1934) (poems by Juan Paredes)
- Tríptico de canciones para canto e piano (1937) (poems by Lorca)
- Seis canciones para canto e piano (1939) (poems by Antonio Machado)
- Dos canciones para canto e piano (1952) (poems by Juan Ramón Jiménez)
- Symphony
- Sonatina for small orchestra (1945)
- Sonata for Violin and Piano
- String Quartet in F♯ minor (Opus 2)
- Quartet for Piano and Strings
- Piano Sonatina
- La duquesa del candil (1948) zarzuela in three acts (libretto by Guillermo and Rafael Fernández-Shaw)

== Selected filmography ==
- Fortunato (1942)
- A Palace for Sale (1942)
- I Will Consult Mister Brown (1946)
- The Black Siren (1947)
- Four Women (1947)
- Lady in Ermine (1947)
- Lola Leaves for the Ports (1947)
- The Party Goes On (1948)
- Guest of Darkness (1948)
- Ninety Minutes (1949)
- Night Arrival (1949)
- A Man on the Road (1949)
- Tempest (1949)
- Wings of Youth (1949)
- The Maragatan Sphinx (1950)
- Tales of the Alhambra (1950)
- Day by Day (1951)
- Malibran's Song (1951)
- La trinca del aire (1951)
- The Seventh Page (1951)
- Love and Desire (1951)
- Spanish Serenade (1952)
- Come Die My Love (1952)
- The Call of Africa (1952)
- Devil's Roundup (1952)
- Lovers of Toledo (1953)
- Women's Town (1953)
- Return to the Truth (1956)
- The Sun Comes Out Every Day (1958)
