= Noceda del Bierzo =

Coordinates: 42°43′00″N 6°24′00″W

- Village, Municipality
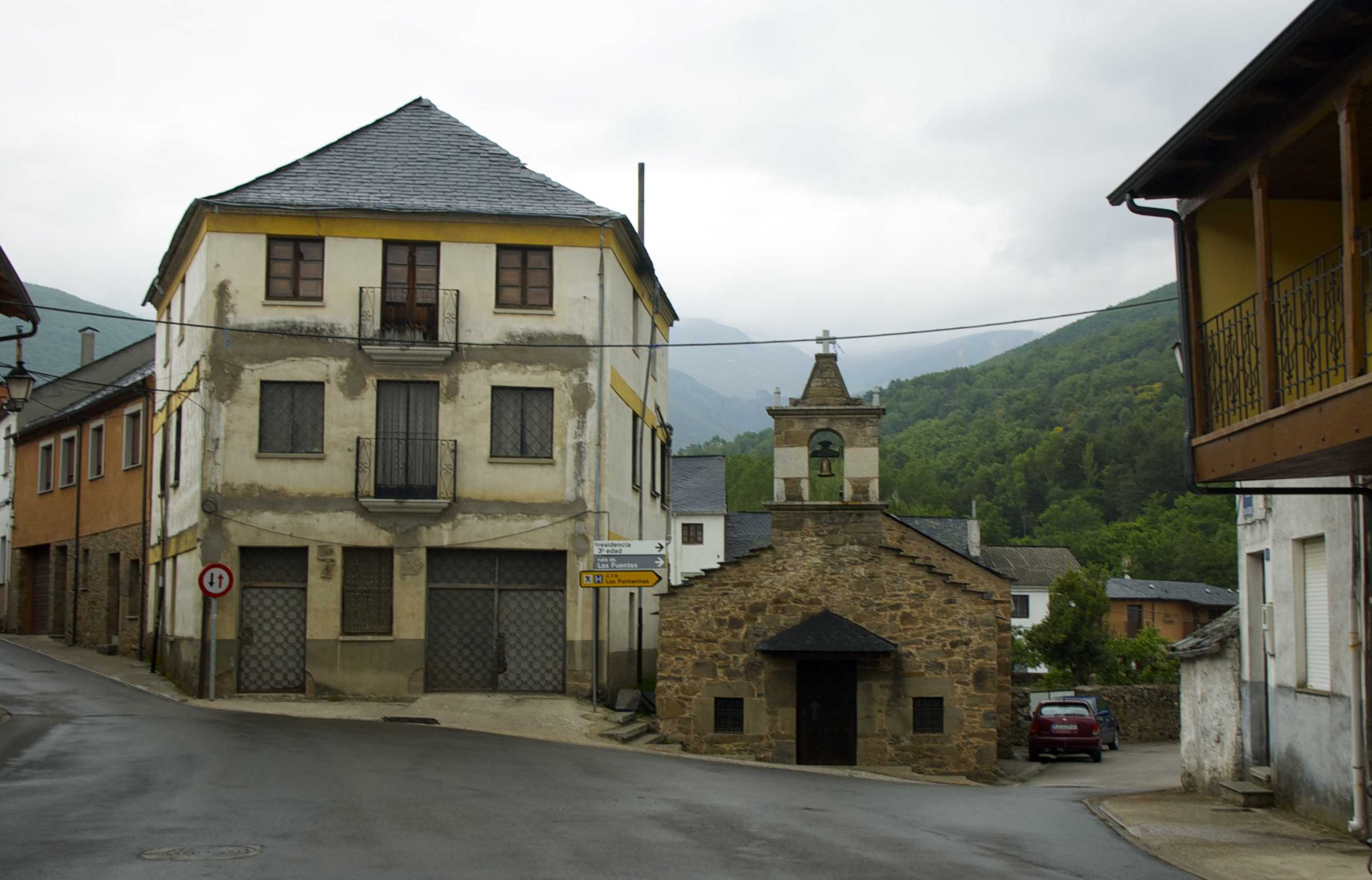
- Noceda del Bierzo, municipality of León, Spain

- Flag Coat of arms

- Location in Castile and León
- Country: Spain
- Autonomous community: Castile and León
- Province: León
- Comarca: El Bierzo

Area
  - Total: 72.14 km^{2} (27.85 sq mi)
- Elevation: 831 m (2,726 ft)

Population (2023)
  - Total: 613
  - Density: 8.50/km^{2} (22.0/sq mi)

Noceda del Bierzo is a village and municipality in the region of El Bierzo, province of León, in the Community of Castile and León, Spain.
