= Estudios Roptence =

Spanish film studios

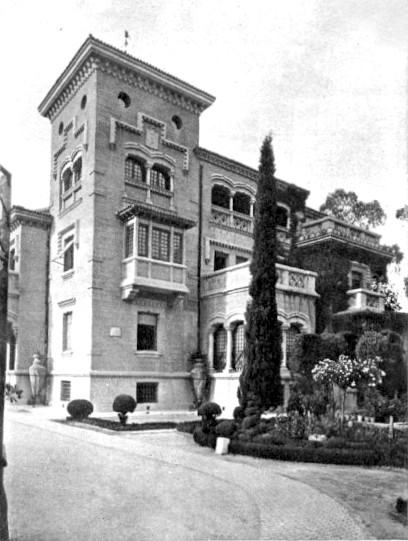
Estudios Roptence in Madrid in 1935.

Estudios Roptence were film studios located in the Spanish capital of Madrid which operated between 1932 and 1956. The studio originally manufactured sound recording equipment, which was sold following the conversion from silent to sound film. The studio were dramatically rebuilt in 1935 and again in 1941. It was not damaged during the Spanish Civil War, and continued to operate. It enjoyed its peak years during the early 1940s, with ten films made there in 1940 alone. One of the companies based there during these years specialised in co-productions with Portugal. After 1946 the studio began to decline in importance as productions moved elsewhere, and was eventually closed in 1956.

Films made in the studio include He's My Man (1934), The Daughter of Juan Simón (1935) and Coner of Madrid (1936).

== Bibliography ==
- Labanyi, Jo & Pavlović, Tatjana. A Companion to Spanish Cinema. John Wiley & Sons, 2012.
