= List of Spanish films of 1970 =

A list of films produced in Spain in 1970 (see 1970 in film).

== 1970 ==
Title	Director	Cast	Genre	Notes
1970
El bosque del lobo	Pedro Olea	José Luis López Vázquez, Amparo Soler Leal	Wolfman	
El jardín de las delicias (The Garden of Delights)	Carlos Saura	José Luis López Vázquez, Esperanza Roy	Drama	Banned by censorship for months
Cuatro desertores (Girls for Mercenaries)	Pascual Cervera	Antonio Cintado, Mónica Sun de Sander Ramsés, María Elena Flores	Action/War	
No desearás al vecino del quinto	Ramón Fernández	Alfredo Landa, Jean Sorel, Princess Ira von Fürstenberg	Comedy	The most successful Spanish film until Torrente 2: Misión en Marbella
The Tigers of Mompracem	Mario Sequi	Ivan Rassimov, Claudia Gravy, Andrea Bosic	Adventure	Co-production with Italy
Tristana	Luis Buñuel	Fernando Rey, Catherine Deneuve, Franco Nero, Lola Gaos	Drama	Academy Award nominee
¡Vivan los novios!	Luis García Berlanga	José Luis López Vázquez, Laly Soldevila	Comedy- Drama	Entered into the 1970 Cannes Film Festival
The Vengeance of Dr. Mabuse	Jesus Franco	Jack Taylor, Fred Williams, Ewa Strömberg		Spanish-West German co-production
