= My Dearest Senorita =

- Spanish film poster
- Spanish: Mi querida señorita
- Directed by: Jaime de Armiñán
- Written by: José Luis Borau; Jaime de Armiñán
- Produced by: Luis Megino
- Starring: José Luis López Vázquez; Julieta Serrano; Antonio Ferrandis
- Cinematography: Luis Cuadrado
- Edited by: Ana Romero Marchent
- Music by: Rafael Ferro
- Release date: 17 February 1972
- Running time: 80 minutes
- Country: Spain
- Language: Spanish

My Dearest Senorita (Spanish: Mi querida señorita) is a 1972 Spanish film directed by Jaime de Armiñán. A romantic drama on the subject of sex change and intersexualism, it was the first Spanish film that talked about sexual orientation, which was a taboo subject in Spain during Franco's regime. The film was nominated for the Academy Award for Best Foreign Language Film at the 45th Academy Awards.

The film was released by In Cine, the Spanish division of Cinerama Releasing.

== Plot ==
Adela, a 43-year-old spinster who lives alone in an isolated northern provincial Spanish village, spends her days sewing and doing charity work. Never feeling particularly attracted to men, she is waited upon in her home by her faithful maid, Isabel (whom she affectionately calls Isabelita), who adores her.

One day, the local bank manager starts to court Adela and sets his sights on marriage. Repulsed by his physical overtures, Adela consults the local priest and confesses that, while she has never been physical with a woman, she feels "embarrassed" around them. Feeling ashamed, she also confesses that she shaves her face every day. On his advice, she resolves to consult a doctor. After a row, Adela fires Isabel. Upon seeing her doctor, Adela is informed that she is not a woman after all but a man. The former Adela moves to Madrid and takes on a new masculine identity, "Juan".

After trying to obtain income with no identity card, Juan runs into Isabel, working as a waitress in a local coffee shop. Soon, Juan begins using his sewing skills (the only skill he has) to bring in a small income and enable him to obtain a work permit. Eventually, he falls in love with Isabel, who reciprocates his feelings. However, out of fear, he resists consummating their relationship. Finally, they successfully have sex; afterwards, he says that one day he will tell her something "very important." Isabelita surprises him by responding, "There is no need, señorita," showing that she already knew his secret.

== Cast ==
- José Luis López Vázquez as Adela Castro Molina / Juan
- Julieta Serrano as Isabelita
- Antonio Ferrandis as Santiago
- Enrique Ávila as Father José María
- Lola Gaos as Aunt Chus
- Chus Lampreave as Chus' niece
- Mónica Randall as Feli
- José Luis Borau as Doctor

== Reception ==
The film attracted international attention and was nominated for an Academy Award for Best Foreign Film in 1973. The previous year, José Luis López Vázquez won the Silver Hugo Award for Best Actor at the Chicago International Film Festival.

== See also ==
- List of submissions to the 45th Academy Awards for Best Foreign Language Film
- List of Spanish submissions for the Academy Award for Best Foreign Language Film

== Notes ==
- Director Jaime de Armiñán and actress Julieta Serrano speak about film at 35 mm de cine español
- Schwartz, Ronald, The Great Spanish Films: 1950- 1990, Scarecrow Press, London, 1991, ISBN 0-8108-2488-4
