= La prima Angélica =

- Theatrical release poster
- Directed by: Carlos Saura
- Written by: Carlos Saura; Rafael Azcona
- Produced by: Elías Querejeta
- Starring: José Luis López Vázquez; Fernando Delgado; Lina Canalejas
- Cinematography: Luis Cuadrado
- Edited by: Pablo González del Amo
- Release date: 29 April 1974
- Running time: 107 minutes
- Country: Spain
- Language: Spanish

Cousin Angelica (Spanish: La prima Angélica) is a 1974 Spanish drama film directed by Carlos Saura. Starring José Luis López Vázquez as a middle-aged man whose memories of his childhood during the Spanish Civil War make him reenact his past as the mature man he is today. The film was entered into the 1974 Cannes Film Festival, won the Jury Prize, and was highly controversial in Spain. It was also selected as the Spanish entry for the Best Foreign Language Film at the 47th Academy Awards, but was not accepted as a nominee.

== Plot ==
Luis, an unmarried, middle-aged, Barcelona businessman, carries out his mother's dying wish to be buried in the family crypt in Segovia. He has her bones exhumed from a pantheon in Barcelona and heads by car to the Castilian city. In the middle of a lonely road, he stops and gets out of the car, recalling the same landscape at a moment in his childhood when he was being brought up to spend part of his summer vacation with his maternal grandmother in Segovia during the fateful summer of 1936. He sees his parents before him, trying to soothe him after a bout of carsickness. Just days before they were to pick him up, a military uprising cut Segovia off from the Republican part of Spain and Luis found himself trapped in the menacing environment of his mother's Nationalist relatives for the duration of the war.

After this first remembrance of his carsickness, Luis continues his journey. Arriving in Segovia, he makes contact with his aunt Pilar and his cousin Angélica, his sweetheart during his Segovian captivity. Angélica is now married to Anselmo, a successful businessman, and has a daughter of her own, also named Angélica, who is just about the age her mother was when she and Luis were sweethearts. The reunion rekindles old memories for Luis.

In these remembrances, the past is not merely evoked, but reenacted with Luis literally entering a time warp. Characters Luis has met in the present appear to him playing the role of relatives he remembers thirty-six years earlier. The child Angélica of 1973, plays the role of her own mother, Luis's cousin Angelica, as he thinks he remembers her from 1936; Anselmo is imagined as Angélica's fascist father. When Luis recalls scenes from his childhood, he walks into them as the middle-aged man he is.

Luis and Angélica meet in the attic, where they discover Luis's old elementary school books and have a kiss in the rooftop, rekindling briefly their closeness. Reading his old school books, he remembers when he was during the war in a religious school in which a little boy is killed by shards of flying glass. The older Luis sits in his schoolroom listening to a priest tell a horror story about a little student, killed in an air raid, who may or may not be eternally damned depending on whether or not the boy had "given in to temptation" the morning he was killed. After his evocation of the school bombing, Luis has an emotional encounter with his cousin Angélica in which she speaks to him of her failed marriage. She intimates a reawakening of the affection she once had for Luis. However, this reinforces Luis's determination to leave Segovia finally. After saying goodbye to his adult relatives, he goes for a bike ride with Angélica's daughter, which triggers his memory of his thwarted escape with his cousin through Nationalist lines in an effort to rejoin his parents. They were promptly stopped by Falangist soldiers and forcedly returned to his uncle's house to be punished. His uncle whips him with a belt. In the next room, Angélica's mother is combing her hair; a tear rolls down one of her cheeks.

== Cast ==
- José Luis López Vázquez - Luis
- Fernando Delgado - Anselmo
- Lina Canalejas - Angélica
- María Clara Fernández de Loaysa - Angélica, child
- Lola Cardona . - Aunt Pilar
- Pedro Sempson - Luis's Father
- Julieta Serrano - Aunt Nun
- Encarna Paso - Luis's mother
- Josefina Díaz - Old Aunt Pilar

== Overview ==
The initial idea for the film came from a specific reference to a cousin Angélica, in a scene from Ana and the wolves (Spanish: Ana y los lobos), director Carlos Saura's previous work. In Ana and the wolves there is an inconsequential bit of dialogue that occurs in the private conversation between the family matriarch and the title character. The old woman speaks of a certain cousin Angélica who, as a small child, coquettishly played with one of her sons. Building on that allusion, Saura and writer Rafael Azcona developed a script about the childhood memories of a man now in his mid forties and his flirtatious cousin, Angélica, on whom he had a crush when he was ten years old. These memories become the lure for the protagonist's reencounter of his long suppressed past.

The film is told as a labyrinthine montage of recreated memories that surface in the waking consciousness of the vanquished past that the protagonist cannot bring himself to confront. The problem for Saura was how to integrate past and present in a coherent narrative. A character who will continuously and seamlessly move form one period of time to another without resorting to the habitual flashback, but rather showing a past which is constantly being recaptured and lived as a present. The idea for this came from a phrase from Ramón del Valle-Inclán : " Things are not as we see them, but as we remember them "

Saura described Luis, the main character in the film a someone who was profoundly touched by the Civil War. Personally, Saura explained, “ I never agreed with the widespread idea that childhood years are the golden years of one's life – maybe because of my own experiences. On the contrary, it seems to me that childhood is a particular uncertain period because, among other reasons, one's childhood is lived almost entirely in an in-between world, and unfolds in a world of great fears and great needs of all kinds. And all of that leaves profound, indelible scars, particularly when one has to live in a hostile environment, like the main characters in the film.

The theme of interdicted history, the Spanish Civil War years as remembered by a child of Republican parents, Saura confronted the censors. The film's sense of liberation comes from its directness in depicting a number of scenes in which the Nationalist cause is either ridiculed or presented as inspired more by petty animosity than by patriotic or religious fervor.

Given its political subject matter, the first two versions of the script were rejected outright by the censors. A third version was finally approved and, after some delays, the finished film was accepted for distribution without cuts.

== Reception ==
=== Box office ===
The film eventually returned to a more or less normal distribution in Spain, although newspapers attacks and protests at screenings continued. The Barcelona Theater where the film was having a successful run was firebombed in July 1974, and thereafter, domestic distribution of Cousin Angélica was suspended. Though never officially banned, the film posed a risk to theater owners fearful of repetitions of the incidents that hampered the Madrid and Barcelona showings. The controversy in Spain only intensified the interest of foreign audiences. Despite the climate of hostility that surrounded it, fueled by the notoriety of the scandal, La prima Angélica was Querejeta and Saura's first formidable box office success, grossing eighty million pesetas by the end of 1975.

=== Critical response ===
Upon release, the film confronted a violent press reaction from the Spanish Right; La prima Angélica was to enter the public consciousness in ways no other Spanish film had. It was to cause a national furor as well, which surpassed in its scope and intensity any of the previous scandals surrounding Spanish film during the Franco years. The Madrid opening was the occasion for violent audience reactions at a number of sessions. Newspapers reports of booing and shouting during the screening and of menacing protest in front of the theater only seemed to fan the flames of public controversy. It was about this time that the film was selected to be shown in the Cannes Film Festival to represent Spain. In the middle of the Cannes film festival, news came that the Madrid run of La prima Angélica had been further marred when masked youths broke into the projection booth and stole two reels of the film. This kind of notoriety created sympathy for the film at Cannes, yet the festival judges chose not to award Angélica any of the regular prizes. Instead, a special award was given to Saura. The Spanish conservative press attacked the award as part of a foreign conspiracy against Spain's honor by praising the detractors of the heroic struggle for National liberation.

The producer, Elías Querejeta, was pressured to make some cuts, in particular to a scene in which a character who breaks his arm has it set in plaster in a fascist salute. Querejeta emphatically refused: ”Legally, I am the only one who can cut the film and I refuse to delete even a single frame". The failure to persuade Querejeta to authorize cuts made the head of the information Ministry resign his post.

=== Awards and nominations ===
Cousin Angélica was selected to be shown in the 1974 Cannes Film Festival and won Jury Prize to Saura.

The film was also selected as the Spanish entry for the Best Foreign Language Film at the 47th Academy Awards, but was not accepted as a nominee.

== DVD release ==
La prima Angélica is available in Region 2 DVD. There is no Region 1 DVD available.

== See also ==
- List of submissions to the 47th Academy Awards for Best Foreign Language Film
- List of Spanish submissions for the Academy Award for Best Foreign Language Film
