= CEC Awards =

Annual Spanish film awards

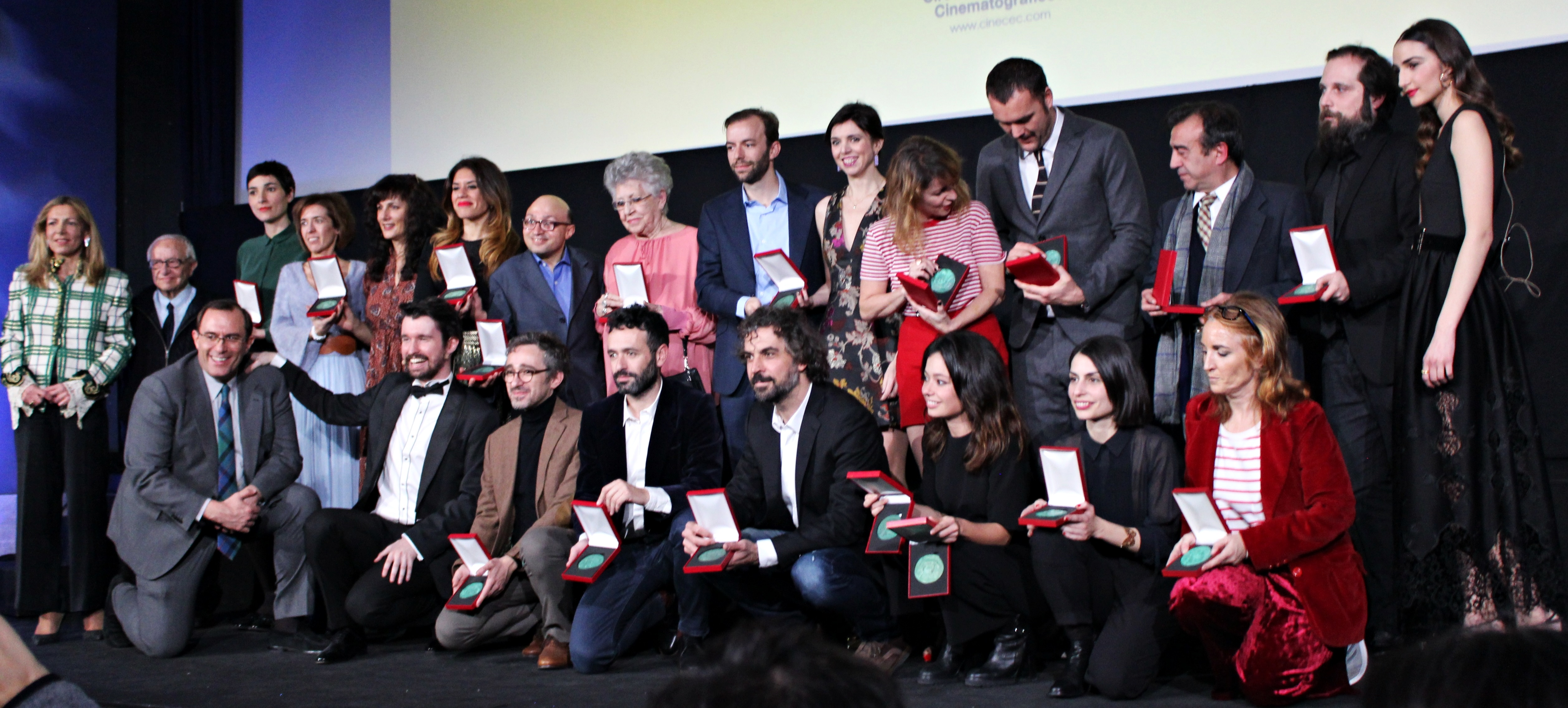
- 2018 winners
- Awarded for: Excellence in film
- Location: Madrid
- Country: Spain
- Presented by: Círculo de Escritores Cinematográficos
- First award: 1946
- Website: Official website

The CEC Awards or CEC Medals (Spanish: Medallas del CEC), whose full name is Medallas del Círculo de Escritores Cinematográficos, are awards presented annually by the Círculo de Escritores Cinematográficos (CEC; transl. Circle of Cinematographic Writers) to distinguish films, artists, technicians, and writers related to cinema, both Spanish and international. The ceremony held its first edition in 1946, when it awarded prizes in thirteen different categories. The categories have varied over time, and in 2016, there were twenty. The awards went through a period of crisis in the 1980s, and the ceremony was suspended from 1986 until 1990. The prize consists of a simple bronze medal and has no financial prize attached to it. They are the oldest cinematic awards in Spain.

== History ==
The Circle of Cinematographic Writers was created in 1945 by fifteen individuals. Their goal was to form an organization to promote cinematographic art in Spain. In 1946, the awards were launched to celebrate films made in the previous year. Despite their lack of financial endowment—the prizes consist of a simple bronze medal designed by the artist González de Ubieta—the awards have achieved a high level of prestige due to their independence, as they are not awarded by the film industry itself or by its corporate sponsors.

In the 1980s, the organization went through a period of crisis. For five years—from 1986 to 1990—the Circle did not hold the ceremony and no awards were granted, and it seemed as if it would become defunct. However, a new CEC leadership, led by Paul Naschy, relaunched the awards in 1991.

== Categories ==
=== Spanish film awards ===
Starting from the first edition of the Premios, categories awarded to domestic productions predominated. The main award was the prize for best film. Various notable Spanish films have received this honour throughout the history of the awards, including Surcos, Plácido, Chimes at Midnight, and El espíritu de la colmena.

Other categories have included best director, best actor, best actress, best supporting actor and actress, best photography, and best music; all of these categories continue to exist to this day. The award has been received by many notable directors, such as José Luis Sáenz de Heredia, Ladislao Vajda, Carlos Saura, José Luis Garci, Luis Buñuel, and Pedro Almodóvar. Well-known award-winning actors include Fernando Fernán Gómez, Ana Mariscal, José Luis López Vázquez, Francisco Rabal, Emma Penella, Fernando Rey, Sara Montiel, Javier Bardem, Concha Velasco, Ricardo Darín, and Penélope Cruz.

Some earlier categories have been removed over the years, while others have remained. A few have been split into separate prizes, such as the award for best screenplay, which is today given to original and adapted screenplays separately. New categories have also been added, including a prize for best montage, best documentary feature film, and best animated film. An award was briefly conferred to the best foreign actor and actress in a Spanish film. Other prizes which were introduced and later cancelled include a prize for best setting and one for best short film.

In 1948, the Gimeno Prize was introduced to reward newcomers. Its name was changed to the Jimeno Prize the following year, and again in 1962, to the Antonio Barbero Prize. Initially limited to a single winner, it was later expanded to honour the best new director, actor, and actress.

=== Foreign film awards ===
In the third year of the ceremony, a medal was awarded for the best foreign film, going to The Best Years of Our Lives. In the 1956 edition, medals were created to celebrate the best foreign actor and actress. A prize was also temporarily awarded to the best Spanish-American film.

=== Writer awards ===
Apart from awards given to film professionals, from the outset, there were others dedicated to highlighting the work of film critics, journalists, and book writers. These awards are more corporate in nature and have often gone to members of the Circle. In the first edition, medals were awarded for best literary work and best critical work. Subsequently, a medal was created for best book, though this is now defunct. In 1952, a prize was created for best journalistic work.

=== Medal of Honour ===
In 1994, a Tribute Award was awarded to American director Francis Ford Coppola. Its delivery was repeated until 2004, when the name was changed to the Medal of Honour. The award goes to professionals in various sectors connected to cinema.
