= El Pisito =

- Spanish theatrical release poster
- Directed by: Marco Ferreri; Isidoro M. Ferry
- Written by: Marco Ferreri; Rafael Azcona
- Produced by: Eduardo Manzanos Brochero; Alberto Soifer
- Starring: Mary Carrillo; José Luis López Vázquez; Concha López Silva; Ángel Álvarez; María Luisa Ponte
- Cinematography: Francisco Sempere
- Edited by: José Antonio Rojo
- Music by: Federico Contreras
- Release date: 15 June 1959
- Running time: 87 minutes
- Country: Spain
- Language: Spanish

El Pisito is a 1959 Spanish black comedy film directed by Marco Ferreri. The Spanish Ministry of Culture forced the producers to sign the film as co-directed by Spaniard Isidoro M. Ferry. It was co-written by famous Spanish screenwriter Rafael Azcona, who collaborated with Ferreri throughout his career. The film was starred by Spanish actor José Luis López Vázquez in his first leading role.

The film depicts widespread poverty in 1950s Madrid. A long-term couple feels unable to marry, because they can not afford the acquisition of a home. They decide that the man will enter a marriage of convenience with the woman's elderly landlady, in hopes of inheriting the lease of the landlady's property. The film was a huge flop when it was released in Spain, but nowadays is a cult classic. The film had troubles with Spanish censorship.

In the film, Marco Ferreri and Carlos Saura appear in cameos.

== Plot ==
In the Madrid of the late 1950s, with a Spain that is barely beginning to emerge from underdevelopment, economic hardship is common among the population. Petrita and Rodolfo have been dating for twelve years, but they cannot get married due to lack of means to acquire a home.

Petrita finally glimpses a solution: Rodolfo will marry Doña Martina, her old and sick landlady, so that when she dies he will inherit the lease on the property at a low price. After the ceremony, however, the old woman will still be able to survive two years. She finally dies, and Petrita and Rodolfo see their goal fulfilled, although pessimism and sadness reign in the environment.

== Cast ==
- Mary Carrillo - Petrita
- José Luis López Vázquez - Rodolfo
- Concha López Silva - Doña Martina Rodríguez
- Ángel Álvarez - Sáenz
- María Luisa Ponte - Petrita's sister
- Andrea Moro - Mari Cruz
- Gregorio Saugar - Don Manuel
- Celia Conde - Mery
- José Cordero - Dimas
- Marco Ferreri - Luisito
- Chus Lampreave - Avelina
