= Angelino Fons =

Spanish film maker

- Born: Angelino Fons Fernández; 6 March 1936; Madrid, Spain
- Died: 7 June 2011; Madrid, Spain
- Occupation: Filmmaker
- Years active: 1966–1991

Angelino Fons Fernández (6 March 1936 – 7 June 2011) was a Spanish film director and screenwriter. He is known for his debut film La busca (The Search) (1966). His career was closely linked to literature, adapting classic Spanish novels to the big screen.

== Career ==
Angelino Fons was born on 6 March 1936 in Madrid, just months before the beginning of the Spanish Civil War. He grew up in Murcia and Orihuela, where he moved with his family in 1940. He studied at the Jesuit school of Santo Domingo in Orihuela, Alicante. He entered the University of Murcia to study Philosophy and Literature. Abandoning his studies at the University of Murcia, Fons returned to Madrid to be trained as a film director and entered the national film school (IIEC), graduating with a specialty in directing in 1960. Angelino Fons began his professional career with his graduation short film A este lado del muro (This side of the wall) based on the novel Las Afueras (The outskirtss) written by Luis Goytisolo. His following project was the short Garabato Sketches based on poems by Rafael Alberti. Fons worked as assistant director to Marco Ferreri in the classical comedy El cochecito (1960). Closely associated with Carlos Saura during that director first decade as a professional filmmaker, Fons collaborated on a number of Saura's scripts during the early 1960s, receiving screen credits for The Hunt (1966), Peppermint Frappé (1967) and Stress Is Three (1968), as well as Francisco Requeiros’ Amador (Lover) (1965).

Fons made his own directorial debut in 1966 with La Busca (The Search), a modern-day adaptation of a novel written by Pio Baroja, marked by a sense of critical realism reminiscent of Miguel Picazo’s La Tía Tula (Aunt Tula). The film was extremely well received and, as a result, Fons basked in critical adulation for a number of years as one of the most promising of the young filmmakers of the generation of film directors of the second half of the 1960s. The Search was followed two years later by the musical Cantando a la Vida (Singing to Life) (1968).

In 1969, Fons began a collaboration with the producer, Emiliano Piedra, directing a weak adaptation of the Perez Galdós novel Fortunata y Jacinta (1969) with the producer's wife Emma Penella, in the lead. This was followed by La Primera Entrega (The First Delivery) (1971), with even less favorable critical results. Fons directed another Perez Galdós adaptation the following year, Marianella (1972), but it was becoming increasingly apparent to critics and audiences that the promise shown in his first film had largely dissipated. Even a collaboration with Carmen Martí- Gaite, on an adaptation of one of her stories Emilia... parada y fonda (Emilia) (1976), scripted by the novelist herself, did little to alter the apparent downward course of Fon's filmmaking career. By the early 1980s, Fons was directing cheap comic sexploitation films such as The Cid cabreador (The Vexing Cid) (1983). He retired as film director in the 1980s.

Afflicted with heart disease, he died on 7 June 2011 aged seventy five.

== Filmography ==
- La busca (1966)
- Cantando a la vida (1968)
- Fortunata y Jacinta (1970)
- La primera entrega (1971)
- Marianela (1972)
- Mi hijo no es lo que parece (1973)
- Separación matrimonial (1973)
- La casa (1974)
- De profesión: polígamo (1975)
- Emilia... parada y fonda (1976)
- Esposa y amante (1977)
- Mar brava (1982)
- El Cid cabreador (1983)
- La huella del crimen 1: episode El crimen de la calle Fuencarral (1985) (Television)

== Bibliography ==
- D’Lugo, Marvin: Guide to the Cinema of Spain, Greenwood Press, 1997. ISBN 0-313-29474-7
