= Luis Cuadrado =

Spanish cinematographer (1934–1980)

- Born: 8 July 1934; Toro, Zamora, Castilla y León, Spain
- Died: 18 January 1980 (aged 45); Madrid, Spain
- Occupation: Cinematographer
- Known for: The Spirit of the Beehive

Luis Cuadrado Encinar (8 July 1934 – 18 January 1980) was a Spanish cinematographer. He became especially known for his work on the 1973 film The Spirit of the Beehive.

== Early life and education ==
Luis Cuadrado Encinar was born on 8 July 1934 in the town of Toro, in the province of Zamora in the autonomous community of Castile and León in Spain. His father, Santos Cuadrado, was a master glassmaker, who worked on the restoration of many cathedrals damaged in the Spanish Civil War. Luis initially tried glassmaking, but then switched to studying medicine, which he gave up after two years.

He spent seven years at the Official School of Cinematography (EOC), voluntarily repeating some of the courses in order to learn lighting techniques of certain masters, as well as gain experience in the Spanish film industry. By the time of his departure from the school in 1963, he had worked in several films, including Los golfos (1959), by Carlos Saura, and El cochecito (1960), by Marco Ferreri.

== Career ==
Cuadrado's debut as head cinematographer was in Saura's film La Caza (1965), which was filmed in black and white, followed by a couple of films in colour during the 1960s, including Saura's 1967 thriller Peppermint Frappe and Jaime Camino's Mañana será otro día, released in the same year. He worked on four spaghetti westerns during the early 1970s: Cut-Throats Nine (1970); Sonny and Jed (1972); Yankee Dudler (1973); and The White, the Yellow, and the Black (1975). He was cinematographer on Victor Erice's acclaimed film The Spirit of the Beehive, released in 1973, providing an essential contribution which many critics have attributed to its success.

Due to an inoperable brain tumour, he started to lose his vision during the filming of The Spirit of the Beehive, and had to rely on his assistants for input. However he continued to provide his services of films made by several of his former fellow EOC students, including José Luis Borau's Furtivos (1975) and Ricardo Franco's Pascual Duarte (1976). During the filming of Angelino Fons' Emilia, parada y fonda (released 1976), he went completely blind.

== Awards ==
Cuadrado won many CEC Awards (Cinema Writers Circle Awards) for best cinematography, almost every year between 1966 and 1977.

== Death ==
Cuadrado became very depressed, and when the pain of the tumour became too much to bear, he committed suicide on 18 January 1980, in Madrid.

== Selected filmography ==
- La Caza (directed by Carlos Saura, 1965)
- Peppermint Frappé (Carlos Saura, 1967)
- Mañana será otro día (Jaime Camino, 1967)
- Urtain, el rey de la selva... o así (1969)
- Cut-Throats Nine (1970)
- Sonny and Jed (1972)
- Yankee Dudler (1973)
- The Spirit of the Beehive (Victor Erice, 1973)
- The White, the Yellow, and the Black (1975)
- Furtivos (José Luis Borau, 1975)
- Pascual Duarte (Ricardo Franco, 1976)
- Emilia, parada y fonda (Angelino Fons, 1976)
