= José Luis López Vázquez =

Spanish actor (1922–2009)

The Most Excellent José Luis López Vázquez
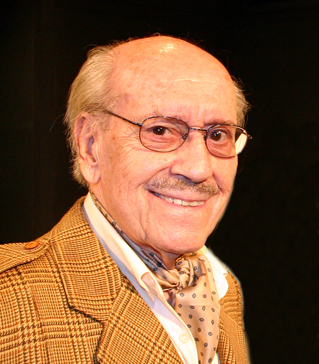
- López Vázquez in 2004
- Born: José Luis López Vázquez de la Torre; 11 March 1922; Madrid, Spain
- Died: 2 November 2009 (aged 87); Madrid, Spain
- Occupations: Actor; Costume designer; Scenic designer; Assistant director; Comedian
- Years active: 1939–2007
- Spouses: Ana María Ventura (divorced) Flor Aguilar (divorced)
- Children: José Luis; Virginia; Cayetana; Camino

José Luis López Vázquez de la Torre (11 March 1922 – 2 November 2009) was a Spanish actor, comedian, costume designer, scenic designer, and assistant director whose career spanned nearly seven decades. He was one of the most prolific and successful actors in Spain in the 20th century, starring in 262 films between 1946 and 2007. Internationally he was best known for his lead role in the surrealist horror telefilm La cabina (1972).

Born in Madrid of working-class parents, López Vázquez began his career on theatre in 1939 as a costume designer and set decorator before making his breakthrough as an actor. In the mid-1940s he switched over to film, where he continued his work in costume designs while serving as an assistant director. Throughout the 1950s he mostly played bit parts in the Spanish film industry, however, his comedic talent soon allowed him to get bigger roles, cultivating an image as Spain's on-screen everyman in numerous comedies during the Franco era and beyond. Around the 1960s he also revealed his ability to play dramatic roles.

At one point in his career he became part of a distinctive Spanish art cinema led primarily by directors Luis García Berlanga, Juan Antonio Bardem, Carlos Saura and screenwriter Rafael Azcona. He played important roles in several films by Berlanga (Plácido, 1961, El Verdugo, 1963, La escopeta nacional, 1978, Patrimonio nacional, 1981, Nacional III, 1982) and Saura (Peppermint Frappé, 1967, The Garden of Delights, 1970, Cousin Angelica, 1974), which gained international attention. He won two consecutives Best Actor awards at the Chicago International Film Festival for The Ancines Woods in 1971 and My Dearest Senorita in 1972. He had the opportunity to occasionally collaborate with renowned foreign filmmakers such as Marco Ferreri (El Pisito, 1959, El Cochecito, 1960) and George Cukor (Travels with My Aunt, 1972).

He was the recipient of numerous accolades, including four CEC Awards, two Fotogramas de Plata, two Sant Jordi Awards, two New York Latin ACE Awards, an Antena de Oro, and a TP de Oro. He earned the Spike of Honour at the Valladolid International Film Festival in 1989, the Actors and Actresses Union Lifetime Achievement Award in 2000, the National Theatre Award in 2002, the Honorary Goya Award in 2004, and the CEC Honorary Award in 2005. The Government of Spain honoured him with the Gold Medal of Merit in the Fine Arts in 1985 and the Gold Medal of Merit in Labour in 1997.

== Early life ==
José Luis López Vázquez was born in Madrid, Spain, on 11 March 1922. The only son of Margarita Vázquez de la Torre, a dressmaker, and Luis López, who worked as an official of the Ministry of Justice. In some biographies he appears as born on 12 March. "With the nerves of the event, my father forgot to register me and he did it the next day" he said. His father also forgot to give the official the name he chose for the baby. And he had to return to his brother José. The offices were already closed and they had to return a day later. He was registered with the nicknames of both. His parents separated when he was very young, causing them to go through difficulties and financial problems. As a teenager he was force to leave his studies and work as an administrative assistant and typist, a period that he began to overcome due to his ability in drawing and painting.

== Career ==
=== Early artistic work ===
In 1939, at the age of 17, he became interested in theatre through the Youth Front and entered in the Universitary Spanish Theatre (TEU) directed by Modesto Higueras. There he outlined his vocation as a draughtsman thanks to the painter José Caballero, who had been part of the group La Barraca led by Federico García Lorca. He originally worked as a scenic designer for the sets of the Theatre of María Guerrero in times of Luis Escobar Kirkpatrick, as well as an assistant director to Pío Ballesteros and Enrique Herreros. The playwright and filmmaker José López Rubio had a decisive influence on his artistic side when he hired him as a costume designer for three films: It Happened in Damascus (1943), Eugenia de Montijo (1944) and Alhucemas (1948). Some of the theatrical productions for which he created costume designs in the 1940s and 1950s are Don Juan Tenorio, where he met Salvador Dalí in 1949, The Phantom Lady, The Village of Stepanchikovo, El caballero de Olmedo, La guardia cuidadosa, a drawing of Don Gil of the Green Breeches, and five sketches for the sets of Life Is a Dream, Y no subió a la cruz, and The Dog in the Manger.

=== Acting ===
==== Film and television ====
In 1946, he made his film debut in Enrique Herreros' crime drama María Fernanda, la Jerezana. A few years later he began a long-time collaboration with director Luis García Berlanga, giving him a small role in the 1951 comedy That Happy Couple, co-directed by Juan Antonio Bardem. Shortly after, he made a part in Bardem's Felices Pascuas (1954), and Berlanga counted on him for two supporting roles in Boyfriend in Sight (1954), playing a nineteenth-century beach flirt, and Miracles of Thursday (1957), as a skeptical priest. He acted in many comedy films in these years, including Los tramposos (1959), directed by Pedro Lazaga, which showed the city of Madrid at the time and some of its most popular scams.

López Vázquez was given the chance to be appreciated abroad for the first time by the Italian director Marco Ferreri, with whom he shot his first starring role in El Pisito (1959), an anti-bourgeois black comedy based on a 1957 novel by screenwriter Rafael Azcona, which is centred on Rodolfo (López Vázquez), a timid, middle-class man who marries a crotchety, dying octogenarian to inherit her apartment and eventually marry his fiancee Petrita (Mary Carrillo). In addition he starred in the short film Se vende un tranvía, a social critique with an anti-clerical point that was co-written by Berlanga and Azcona. The following year he appeared in Ferreri's El Cochecito (1960), with Pepe Isbert in the lead role in a sardonic study of geriatric revolt. The film won the FIPRESCI Prize at the Venice Film Festival. All these films were oblique critiques of Franco's totalitarian regime.

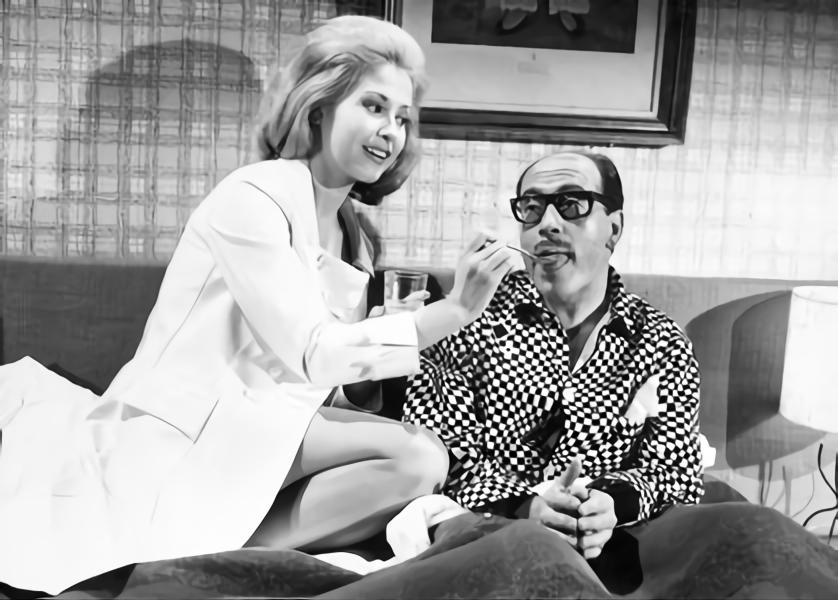
With Fanny Cano in Operación secretaria (1966)

In the early 1960s he worked on two Berlanga's savage satires: Plácido (1961), nominated to the Academy Award as Best Foreign Language Film in 1962, where López Vázquez shined in the role as Gabino Quintanilla, an event organizer without moral principles. His performance was acclaimed in the Sant Jordi Awards as Best Actor. And the classic Spanish film El Verdugo (The Executioner, 1963), playing an eccentric tailor who is brother of the main character (Nino Manfredi). He portrayed relevant comic roles such as the godfather in La gran familia (1962), and as Fernando Galindo, a bank clerk who plans a robbery of his own bank with the help of other employees in José María Forqué's comedy Atraco a las tres (Robbery at 3 o'clock, 1962). The character's quote "Fernando Galindo, un admirador, un amigo, un esclavo, un siervo" ("Fernando Galindo, an admirer, a friend, a slave, a servant") would become essential within Spanish culture. The movie co-starred the Spanish actress Gracita Morales, which he formed a popular partnership in such comedies as Pedro Lazaga's Sor Citroën (1967), and Mariano Ozores' Operation Mata Hari (1968). Together with Paco Martínez Soria he also stars in Lazaga's 1968 film El turismo es un gran invento, one of the most representative comedies of the construction boom in the 60s in Spain.

In 1967 he played his first dramatic role in Carlos Saura's psychological thriller Peppermint Frappé, as a physician becoming obsessively infatuated with his childhood friend's attractive wife (Geraldine Chaplin); he won the CEC Award for Best Actor awarded by the Círculo de Escritores Cinematográficos (Cinema Writers Circle) in 1968. Both comedy and drama, his performances were usually marked by solitary and repressed characters. Then he chained a series of major projects, starting when director Pedro Olea chose him for the lead role in the 1970 horror film El Bosque del Lobo (The Ancines Woods), in which he was the epilectic peddler Benito Freire (based on Spanish serial killer Manuel Blanco Romasanta), who, due a childhood trauma, periodically suffered from an irresistible urge to strangle women. That performance earned him the Best Actor honour at the Chicago International Film Festival in 1971. This was followed by Berlanga's 1970 black comedy Long Live the Bride and Groom, as a man about to get married when his mother appear dead in the pool shortly before the ceremony, and his second collaboration with Saura in The Garden of Delights (1970), as a ruthless tycoon, catatonic and paralysed in a wheelchair after a car accident, who holds the key to his family's fortune. His role was described by critic Roger Greenspun of The New York Times as "hilarious" and "pathetic" and even "terrifying".

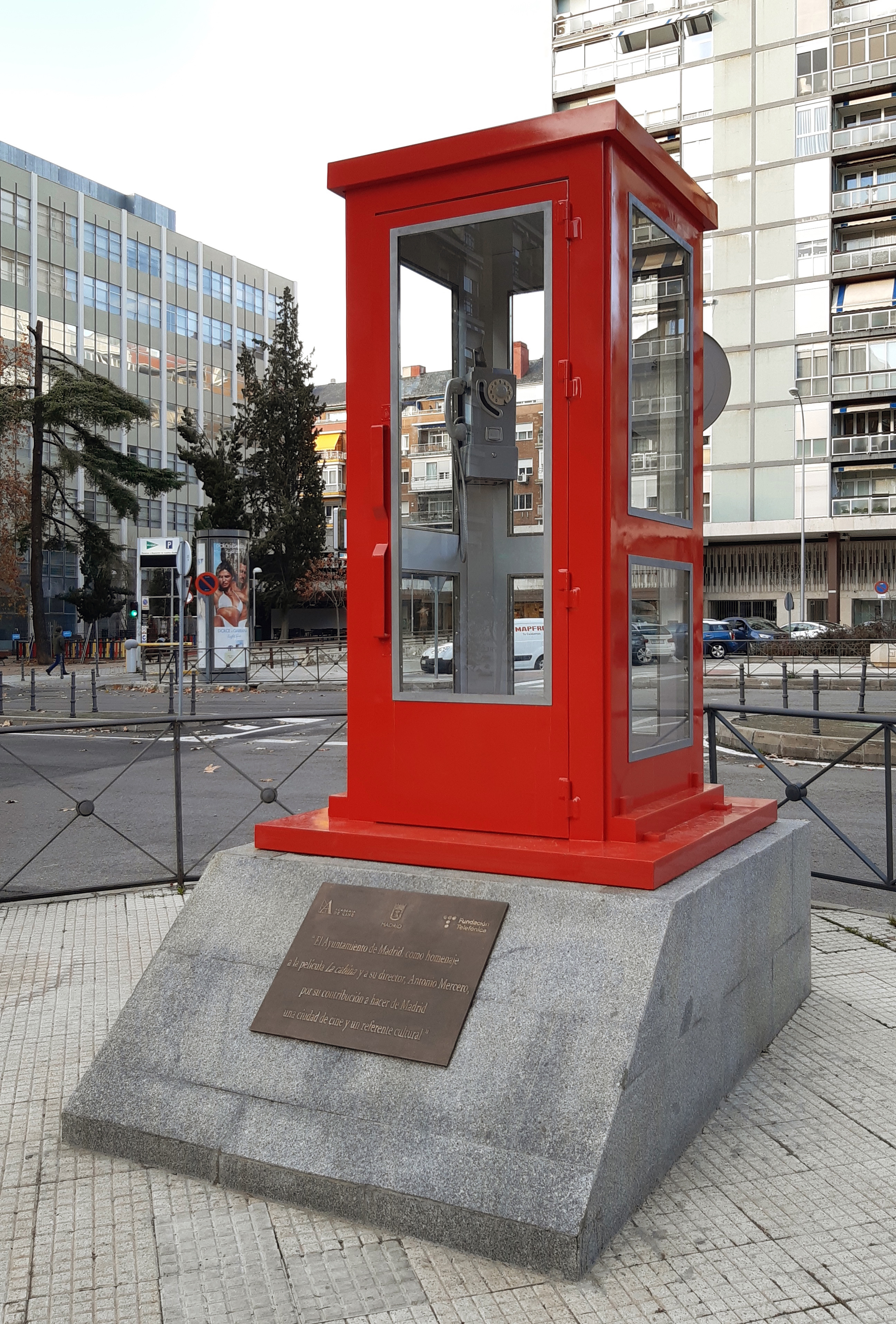
Monument to the 1972 telefilm La cabina in Madrid.

By the 1970s he was a firmly established figure in Spanish cinema, appearing in eleven films in 1972, including Jaime de Armiñán's Academy Award for Best Foreign Language Film-nominee My Dearest Senorita, which he would win the Best Actor Silver Hugo for a second year in a row at the Chicago Film Festival for his complex role as Adela Castro Molina/Juan, a woman who discovers that "she" is a man, and Antonio Mercero's International Emmy Awards-winning television film La cabina, a psychological horror story about a man (López Vázquez) trapped in a telephone booth filmed by Televisión Española (TVE); López Vázquez won the Antena de Oro, the Fotogramas de Plata, and the Latin ACE Award for his performance. In this decade he participated in the international film productions The Legend of Frenchie King (1971), a western comedy directed by Christian-Jaque and starring Claudia Cardinale and Brigitte Bardot, and George Cukor's American comedy Travels with My Aunt (1972), which he co-starred opposite Dame Maggie Smith as M. Dambreuse, her wealthy former French lover. After the film was completed, Cukor invited him to Hollywood, proposing that he learn English to become a star, but López Vázquez declined the offer.

He collaborated again with Olea in the 1973 thriller No es bueno que el hombre esté solo, as a widowed man living with a life-size doll whose secret is discovered by a new neighbour (Carmen Sevilla). The same year he starred in Manuel Gutiérrez Aragón's drama Habla, mudita, as Ramiro, a linguist who is fascinated by a young mute shepherdess (Kiti Mánver). Later he performed in Saura's Cousin Angelica (1974), winner of the Jury Prize at the Cannes Film Festival, in which he is a middle-aged bachelor who finds, on his return to Barcelona after many years away, that the cousin he loved as a child is now married to a fascist. Critic Vincent Canby said he was "super" in the part. He also played an old Antoni Gaudí in a 45-minute uneven film directed by John Alaimo that was unreleased until 2009 called Antoni Gaudí, An Unfinished Vision (1974).

In the next years he continued working with regularity in films and television, notably in Mercero's television series Este señor de negro (1975–1976), as Sixto Zabaleta, a bench jeweler who represents the most archaic and outdated values of the Spanish society, Pedro Masó's comedy drama La miel (1979), which he starred alongside Jane Birkin as a schoolteacher who is attracted to the young mother of a student (Jorge Sanz), the film based on Eduardo Mendoza Garriga's 1975 novel The Truth on the Savolta Affair (1980), as Domingo 'Pajarito' de Soto, a journalist who investigates the violent death of a worker at the Savolta weapons factory, and Berlanga's trilogy La escopeta nacional (1978), Patrimonio nacional (1981) and Nacional III (1982), performing a marquis of the aristocratic Leguineche family in a satire on the powers of Franco's regime.

Other film appearances in the 1980s include Mario Camus' Golden Bear-winning film The Beehive (1982), based on the 1950 novel by Camilo José Cela in which he plays an ex-Communist scratching out an existence in Francoist Spain, Olea's period drama Akelarre (1984), portraying an inquisitor, The Court of the Pharaoh (José Luis García Sánchez, 1985), as a bumbling police inspector, Mi general (de Armiñán, 1987), for which he won a second Latin ACE Award in 1989, the comedy Moors and Christians (Berlanga, 1987), as a shameless man who drags an entire family into a delirious odyssey in which they come across grotesque characters, the antimilitarist tragicomedy The Little Spanish Soldier (Antonio Giménez-Rico, 1988), and the historical film Esquilache (Josefina Molina, 1989), as Antonio Campos, the secretary of Leopoldo de Gregorio, 1st Marquess of Esquilache (Fernando Fernán Gómez).

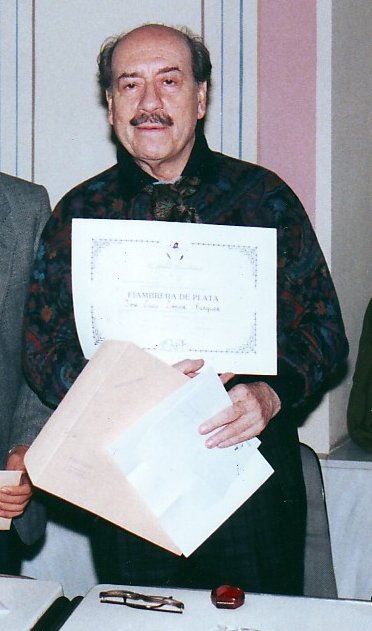
López Vázquez receiving the Fiambrera de Plata from the Ateneo de Córdoba in 1989.

In 1989, the Valladolid International Film Festival (Seminci) commemorated his career by awarding him the Spike of Honour in its 34th edition.

From the 1990s, López Vázquez slowed down and did mostly supporting work in The Long Winter (Jaime Camino, 1992), The Fencing Master (Olea, 1992), as the inspector Jenaro Campillo in a film based on the 1988 novel of the same name by Arturo Pérez-Reverte, the comedy Everyone Off to Jail (Berlanga, 1993), as a priest who pretends to be a socialist, the fantasy thriller Memorias del ángel caído (David Alonso, Fernando Cámara, 1997), the action comedy Torrente 2: Mission in Marbella (Santiago Segura, 2001), in a cameo appearance as a client of José Luis Torrente, Moscow Gold (Jesús Bonilla, 2003), the Argentine comedy-drama Moon of Avellaneda (Juan José Campanella, 2004), as the elderly Don Aquiles, and And Who Are You? (Mercero, 2007), a drama film about Alzheimer's disease. In between, he was part of the cast of such television series as La forja de un rebelde (Camus, 1990), El Quijote de Miguel de Cervantes (Gutiérrez de Aragón, 1992), starring Fernando Rey as Don Quixote, the comedy show Los ladrones van a la oficina (1993–1996), and making a special appearance in the prime time historical series Cuéntame cómo pasó (2002).

On 30 January 2005, he received the Honorary Goya Award at the 19th Goya Awards ceremony for his lifetime achievement, which had the longest standing ovation of the evening, dedicating his distinction primarily to the public.

==== Theatre ====
López Vázquez developed his stage career in the theatres of Madrid. In 1943 he was in the cast of El casamiento engañoso, at the Theatre of María Guerrero. Although cinema kept him away from theatre for almost three decades, he returned to it regularly at the end of the 20th century. Among the stage productions in which he starred: Charles Dickens' The Old Curiosity Shop, 1947; Lope de Vega's La dama boba, 1951; André Roussin's Bobosse, 1953; Pietro Garinei's Buonanotte Bettina, 1958; Alexandre Dumas' Kean, 1958; Cartas credenciales, 1960; Alfonso Paso's Los Palomos, 1964; Murray Schisgal's Luv, 1967; Peter Shaffer's Equus, 1976; in the lead role as the psychiatrist Martin Dysart, Fermín Cabal's Vade Retro!, 1982; Arthur Miller's Death of a Salesman, 1985; which won critical praise for his performance as Willy Loman, Santiago Moncada's Cena para dos, 1991, and Neil Simon's The Sunshine Boys, 1997. His portrayal as Julius Caesar in George Bernard Shaw's play Caesar and Cleopatra at the International Festival of Classical Theatre of Mérida in 2001 received public acclaim. In 2002, the Spanish Ministry of Culture awarded him the National Theatre Prize "for his extraordinary quality as a tragicomic actor throughout a long artistic career, which is still present today on our stages". His last theatrical performance was in the 2004 play Tres hombres y un destino.

== Personal life, death and legacy ==
In 1951 he was married with the actress Ana María Ventura, but the couple were unable to have offspring. He later get into an eighteen-year relationship with Katty Magerus although they could not marry due to the lack of divorce. They had two children, José Luis (b. 1962), and Virginia (b. 1965), who died in the United States in 1994. He also had two other daughters with the journalist Flor Aguilar, named Cayetana and Camino. In his latter years he had a relationship with the actress Carmen de la Maza. He amassed a great fortune due to his work in cinema and lived in a duplex of 400 square meters on Paseo de la Castellana of the Spanish capital.

López Vázquez died of natural causes in Madrid on 2 November 2009, at the age of 87. After his death, several tributes were paid to him, among them Álex de la Iglesia, president of the Spanish Film Academy, who said, "One of the greatest actors is gone, one of the legs of the table of great Spanish cinema along with Fernando Fernán Gómez and Pepe Isbert". The actor and filmmaker Santiago Segura stated that his death represents "the end of an era". His coffin was installed at the Theatre of María Guerrero, headquarters of the national theatre company Centro Dramático Nacional (CDN), which was attended by figures such as actresses Carmen Sevilla and Verónica Forqué, film director Pedro Almodóvar, the mayor of Madrid Alberto Ruiz-Gallardón, and the Prince and Princess of Asturias. He was later cremated in the Almudena Cemetery in Madrid.

In 2010, his biography was posthumously published under the title ¿Para qué te cuento?: biografía autorizada de José Luis López Vázquez, written by Luis Lorente, who claimed that López Vázquez "belongs to a generation of extraordinary actors who have no replacement". In the same year, the Cultural Centre José Luis López Vázquez was opened in the San Blas-Canillejas district in Madrid, and on 6 July, Correos, the Spanish postal service, issued a sheet of stamps in tribute to him as part of its Spanish cinema series.

In 2022 it was released the documentary José Luis López Vázquez: ¡Qué disparate!, directed by Roberto J. Oltra and sponsored by the actor's son, José Luis López Magerus, to commemorate his 100th birth anniversary, which explores the reasons for his success throughout his career. On 10 March, a silhouette was placed on the monument of La cabina installed in Madrid to remember his performance in the television film.

In 2024, the Cultural Space Serrería Belga (Medialab Matadero) is presenting the exhibition José Luis before López Vázquez, showing the lesser-known facets of the actor. Through approximately one hundred pieces, it shows his work as a draughtsman, costume designer, and set designer, without neglecting his acting career and his more personal side, including little-known pieces from his private life. The exhibition also focuses on his facet as an art collector, which shows for the first time some of the works he collected over the years. These include works by Maruja Mallo (La sorpresa del trigo), Salvador Dalí (Cabeza de Gala), Antoni Tàpies (Jazz), Alberto Sánchez Pérez (Pájaro bebiendo agua), Antonio Saura (Ancestro 5), Fernando Zóbel de Ayala y Montojo (Pequeño esquema para...), Juan Manuel Díaz-Caneja (Naturaleza muerta), Benjamín Palencia (Boceto para La Barraca), Edgar Neville (Quai de la Seine), a drawing by José Caballero from 1936 and two drawings by Federico García Lorca from 1935.

== Selected filmography ==
=== Cinema ===
- María Fernanda la Jerezana (1946)
- That Happy Couple (1951)
- The Devil Plays the Flute (1953)
- Felices Pascuas (1954)
- Boyfriend in Sight (1954)
- An Andalusian Gentleman (1954)
- Andalusia Express (1956)
- Miracles of Thursday (1957)
- Night and Dawn (1958)
- Back to the Door (1959)
- El pisito (1959)
- Los tramposos (1959)
- Se vende un tranvía (1959)
- Heaven at Home (1960)
- El Cochecito (1960)
- Carnival Day (1960)
- The Economically Handicapped (1960)
- Three Ladies (1960)
- Police Calling 091 (1960)
- Plácido (1961)
- Tres de la Cruz Roja (1961)
- Atraco a las tres (1962)
- La gran familia (1962)
- You and Me Are Three (1962)
- Accident 703 (1962)
- El Verdugo (1963)
- The Daughters of Helena (1963)
- Three Sparrows and a Bit (1964)
- Television Stories (1965)
- He's My Man! (1966)
- Balearic Caper (1966)
- Forty Degrees in the Shade (1967)
- Love in Flight (1967)
- Amor a la española (1967)
- Peppermint Frappé (1967)
- Sor Citroën (1967)
- Operation Mata Hari (1968)
- El turismo es un gran invento (1968)
- Cuidado con las señoras (1968)
- Objetivo Bi-ki-ni (1968)
- The Ancines Woods (1970)
- Long Live the Bride and Groom (1970)
- El jardín de las delicias (1970)
- Blanca por fuera y Rosa por dentro (1971)
- The Legend of Frenchie King (1971)
- My Dearest Senorita (1971)
- Travels with My Aunt (1972)
- Habla, mudita (1973)
- No es bueno que el hombre esté solo (1973)
- La descarriada (1973)
- La prima Angélica (1974)
- The Marriage Revolution (1974)
- Antoni Gaudí, An Unfinished Vision (1974)
- Zorrita Martínez (1975)
- La escopeta nacional (1978)
- Tigers in Lipstick (1979)
- I viaggiatori della sera (1979)
- La miel (1979)
- F.E.N. (1979)
- The Truth on the Savolta Affair (1980)
- National Heritage (1981)
- Nacional III (1982)
- Vatican Conspiracy (1982)
- La colmena (1982)
- Old Shirt to New Jacket (1982)
- Juana la Loca... de vez en cuando (1983)
- Akelarre (1984)
- The Court of the Pharaoh (1985)
- Hay que deshacer la casa (1986)
- Moors and Christians (1987)
- Mi general (1987)
- The Little Spanish Soldier (1988)
- Esquilache (1989)
- The Fencing Master (1992)
- The Long Winter (1992)
- Everyone Off to Jail (1993)
- Memorias del ángel caído (1997)
- Torrente 2: Mission in Marbella (2001)
- El oro de Moscú (2003)
- Moon of Avellaneda (2004)
- And Who Are You? (2007)

=== Television ===
- Palma y don Jaime (1960)
- Tercero izquierda (1962–1963)
- La cabina (1972)
- Este señor de negro (1975–1976)
- La forja de un rebelde (1990)
- El Quijote de Miguel de Cervantes (1992)
- Los ladrones van a la oficina (1993–1996)
- Café con leche (1998)
- La gran familia... 30 años después (1999)
- El botones Sacarino (2000)
- Cuéntame cómo pasó (2002)

=== Documentary ===
- José Luis López Vázquez:¡Qué disparate! (2022)

== Stage ==
- 1943: El casamiento engañoso
- 1947: El anticuario
- 1951: La dama boba
- 1953: Bobosse
- 1954: La otra orilla
- 1958: Buonanotte Bettina
- 1958: Kean
- 1960: Cartas credenciales
- 1964: Los Palomos
- 1967: Luv
- 1976: Equus
- 1982: ¡Vade Retro!
- 1985: Death of a Salesman
- 1987: El manifiesto
- 1991: Cena para dos
- 1996: Mariquilla Terremoto
- 1997: The Sunshine Boys
- 2000: Que viene mi marido
- 2001: La raya en el pelo de William Holden
- 2001: Caesar and Cleopatra
- 2004: Tres hombres y un destino

== Accolades ==
=== Pepe Isbert National Theatre Awards ===
Year	Result	Ref.
1997	Won	

=== National Theatre Awards ===
Year	Result	Ref.
2002	Won	

=== Goya Awards ===
Year	Category	Result	Ref.
2004	Honorary Goya Award	Won	

=== Chicago International Film Festival ===
Year	Category	Work	Result	Ref.
1971	Best Actor	The Ancines Woods	Won	
1972	Best Actor	My Dearest Senorita	Won	

=== Valladolid International Film Festival ===
Year	Category	Result	Ref.
1989	Spike of Honour	Won	

=== Círculo de Escritores Cinematográficos ===
Year	Category	Work	Result	Ref.
1961	Best Supporting Actor	Police Calling 091	Won	
1962	Best Supporting Actor	For his works over the year	Won	
1968	Best Actor	Peppermint Frappé	Won	
1972	Best Actor	My Dearest Senorita	Won	
2006	CEC Honorary Award	–	Won	

=== Fotogramas de Plata ===
Year	Category	Work	Result	Ref.
1971	Best Spanish Film Performer	The Ancines Woods	Won	
1972	Best Television Performer	La cabina	Won	
2006	Lifetime Achievement	–	Won	

=== National Syndicate of Spectacle, Spain ===
Year	Category	Work	Result	Ref.
1962	Best Male Star	Atraco a las tres	Won	
1971	Best Male Star	My Dearest Senorita	Won	
1975	Best Male Star	Zorrita Martinez	Won	

=== Actors and Actresses Union Awards ===
Year	Category	Work	Result	Ref.
2000	Lifetime Achievement	–	Won	

=== Sant Jordi Awards ===
Year	Category	Work	Result	Ref.
1961	Best Spanish Actor	Plácido	Won	
1972	Best Performance in a Spanish film	The Garden of Delights; The Ancines Woods	Won	

=== TP de Oro ===
Year	Category	Work	Result	Ref.
1976	Best National Actor	Este señor de negro	Won	

=== Antena de Oro ===
Year	Category	Work	Result	Ref.
1974	Best Performance	La cabina	Won	

=== New York Latin ACE Awards ===
Year	Category	Work	Result	Ref.
1976	TV – Best Actor	La cabina	Won	
1989	Cinema – Best Supporting Actor	Mi general	Won	

=== L'Alfàs del Pi Film Festival ===
Year	Category	Result	Ref.
1989	Faro de Plata – Lifetime Achievement	Won	

=== Huelva Ibero-American Film Festival ===
Year	Category	Result	Ref.
1996	Prize of the City of Huelva	Won	

=== Málaga Film Festival ===
Year	Category	Result	Ref.
2001	Honorary Golden Biznaga	Won	

== Honours ==
- Gold Medal of Merit in the Fine Arts (Kingdom of Spain, 19 June 1985)
- Gold Medal of Merit in Labour (Kingdom of Spain, 19 December 1997)
