= 1974 Cannes Film Festival =

- Official poster of the 27th Cannes Film Festival, an original illustration by Georges Lacroix.
- Opening film: Amarcord
- Closing film: S*P*Y*S
- Location: Cannes, France
- Founded: 1946
- Awards: Grand Prix: The Conversation
- No. of films: 26 (In Competition)
- Festival date: 9 May 1974 – 24 May 1974
- Website: festival-cannes.com/en

Cannes Film Festival
- 1975 1973

The 27th Cannes Film Festival took place from 9 to 24 May 1974. French filmmaker René Clair served as jury president for the main competition.

The Grand Prix, then the festival's main prize, was awarded to American filmmaker Francis Ford Coppola for the drama film The Conversation.

The festival opened with Amarcord by Federico Fellini, and closed with S*P*Y*S by Irvin Kershner.

== Juries ==
=== Main Competition ===
- René Clair, French filmmaker - Jury President
- Jean-Loup Dabadie, French journalist
- Kenne Fant, Swedish actor
- Félix Labisse, French painter
- Irwin Shaw, American writer
- Michel Soutter, Swiss filmmaker
- Monica Vitti, Italian actress
- Alexander Walker, British film critic and author
- Rostislav Yurenev, Soviet film critic

== Official Selection ==
=== In Competition ===
The following feature films competed for the Grand Prix International du Festival:

English Title	Original Title	Director(s)	Production Country
Ali: Fear Eats the Soul	Angst essen Seele auf	Rainer Werner Fassbinder	West Germany
Arabian Nights	Il fiore delle Mille e una notte	Pier Paolo Pasolini	Italy, France
The Bear Cage	La cage aux ours	Marian Handwerker	Belgium
Cats' Play	Macskajáték	Károly Makk	Hungary
The Conversation		Francis Ford Coppola	United States
Cousin Angelica	La prima Angélica	Carlos Saura	Spain
Daughters, Daughters	אבו אל בנאת	Moshé Mizrahi	Israel
Garm Hava		M. S. Sathyu	India
Himiko	卑弥呼	Masahiro Shinoda	Japan
The Holy Office	El santo oficio	Arturo Ripstein	Mexico
Hopelessly Lost	Совсем пропащий	Georgiy Daneliya	Soviet Union
The Hour of Liberation Has Arrived	ساعة التحرير دقت	Heiny Srour	France, Lebanon, United Kingdom
The Last Detail		Hal Ashby	United States
The Last Word	Последната дума	Binka Zhelyazkova	Bulgaria
Mahler		Ken Russell	United Kingdom
Milarepa		Liliana Cavani	Italy
The Nickel Ride		Robert Mulligan	United States
The Nine Lives of Fritz the Cat		Robert Taylor	United States
Once Upon a Time in the East	Il était une fois dans l'est	André Brassard	Canada
The Others	Les autres	Hugo Santiago	France
Somewhere Beyond Love	Delitto d'amore	Luigi Comencini	Italy
Stavisky		Alain Resnais	France, Italy
The Sugarland Express		Steven Spielberg	United States
Symptoms		José Ramón Larraz	United Kingdom
Thieves Like Us		Robert Altman	United States
Violins at the Ball	Les violons du bal	Michel Drach	France

=== Out of Competition ===
The following films were selected to be screened out of competition:

- 1789 by Ariane Mnouchkine
- Amarcord by Federico Fellini
- And Now My Love (Toute une vie) by Claude Lelouch
- Birds Do It, Bees Do It by Nicolas Noxon, Irwin Rosten
- Entr'acte by René Clair
- The Homecoming by Peter Hall
- The Grand Maneuver (Les Grandes Manoeuvres) by René Clair
- Henry Miller, Poète Maudit by Michèle Arnault
- Lancelot du Lac by Robert Bresson
- Once by Mort Heilig
- Parade by Jacques Tati
- Picasso, L'Homme et Son Oeuvre by Edward Quinn
- S*P*Y*S by Irvin Kershner
- Le Trio Infernal by Francis Girod

=== Short Films Competition ===
The following short films competed for the Short Film Palme d'Or:

- Akvarium by Zdenka Doitcheva
- Another Saturday Night by Steven B. Poster, Mik Derks
- Carnet trouvé chez les fourmis by Georges Senechal
- Hunger by Peter Foldes
- I stała się światłość by Jerzy Kalina
- Jocselekedetek by Béla Vajda
- Leonarduv denik by Jan Švankmajer
- O sidarta by Michel Jakar
- Ostrov (Island) by Fyodor Khitruk

== Parallel sections ==
=== International Critics' Week ===
The following feature films were screened for the 13th International Critics' Week (13e Semaine de la Critique):

- A Bigger Splash by Jack Hazan (United Kingdom)
- Na wylot by Grzegorz Królikiewicz (Poland)
- The Spirit of the Beehive (El espíritu de la colmena) by Víctor Erice (Spain)
- Hearts and Minds by Peter Davis (United States)
- The Hour of Liberation Has Arrived (L’heure de la libération a sonné) by Heiny Srour (Lebanon)
- I.F.Stone’s Weekly by Jerry Bruck Jr (United States)
- La Paloma by Daniel Schmid (Switzerland)
- The Promised Land by Miguel Littín (Chile)
- Der Tod des Flohzirkusdirektos by Thomas Koerfer (Switzerland)

=== Directors' Fortnight ===
The following films were screened for the 1974 Directors' Fortnight (Quinzaine des Réalizateurs):

- A Noite Do Espantalho by Sergio Ricardo (Brazil)
- A Rainha Diaba by Antonio Carlos Fontura (Brazil)
- Au-delà des sables by Radu Gabrea (Romania)
- Celine and Julie Go Boating (Céline et Julie vont en bateau) by Jacques Rivette (France)
- Contra la Razon y por la Fuerza (doc.) by Carlos Ortiz Tejeda (Mexico)
- La Coupe à 10 francs by Philippe Condroyer (France)
- Erica Minor by Bertrand Van Effenterre (Switzerland)
- The Expropriation (La expropiación) by Raúl Ruiz (Chile)
- The Extradition (Die Auslieferung) by Peter von Gunten (Switzerland)
- Gelegenheitsarbeit einer Sklavin by Alexander Kluge (West Germany)
- ¡Hay que matar al general! (Operación Alfa) by Enrique Urteaga (Chile)
- Il pleut toujours où c'est mouillé by Jean-Daniel Simon (France)
- Lars Ole, 5C by Nils Malmros (Denmark)
- The Last Betrothal (Les Dernières Fiançailles) by Jean Pierre Lefebvre (Canada)
- Let Mrtve Ptice by Živojin Pavlović (Yugoslavia)
- Manifest by Antonis Lepeniotis (Austria)
- Mean Streets by Martin Scorsese (United States)
- The Migrants by Tom Gries (United States)
- Morel's Invention (L'invenzione di Morel) by Emidio Greco (Italy)
- Once Upon a Time There Was a Singing Blackbird (Iko shashvi mgalobeli) by Otar Iosseliani (Soviet Union)
- Padatik by Mrinal Sen (India)
- Processo Per Direttisima by Lucio De Caro (Italy)
- The Profiteer (Il Saprofita) by Sergio Nasca (Italy)
- Sweet Movie by Dušan Makavejev (Canada, France, West Germany)
- Uira by Gustavo Dahl (Brazil)
- Vai Travalhar Vagabundo by Hugo Carvanna (Brazil)
- La Vérité sur l'imaginaire passion d'un inconnu by Marcel Hanoun (France)

Short films

- L'Agression by Frank Cassenti (France)
- Au nom de Jésus by José Rodrigues Dos Santos, Gérard Loubeau (Ivory Coast)
- Brainwash by Ronald Bijlsma (Netherlands)
- Film sur Hans Bellmeer by Catherine Binet (France)
- Liberté-Jean by Jean-Michel Carré (France)
- Une puce sur un no man's land by Marie-France Molle (France)
- Stillborn by Ladd Mc Portlan] (United States)
- Winda by Jerzy Kucia (Poland)

== Official Awards ==
=== Main Competition ===
- Grand Prix du Festival International du Film: The Conversation by Francis Ford Coppola
- Grand Prix Spécial du Jury: Arabian Nights by Pier Paolo Pasolini
- Best Screenplay: Hal Barwood, Matthew Robbins and Steven Spielberg for The Sugarland Express
- Best Actress: Marie-José Nat for Violins at the Ball
- Best Actor: Jack Nicholson for The Last Detail
- Jury Prize: La prima Angélica by Carlos Saura

=== Short Films Competition ===
- Grand Prix International du Festival: Ostrov by Fyodor Khitruk
- Jury Prize: Hunger by Peter Foldes
The Jury President and the winners of the 1974 Grand Prix

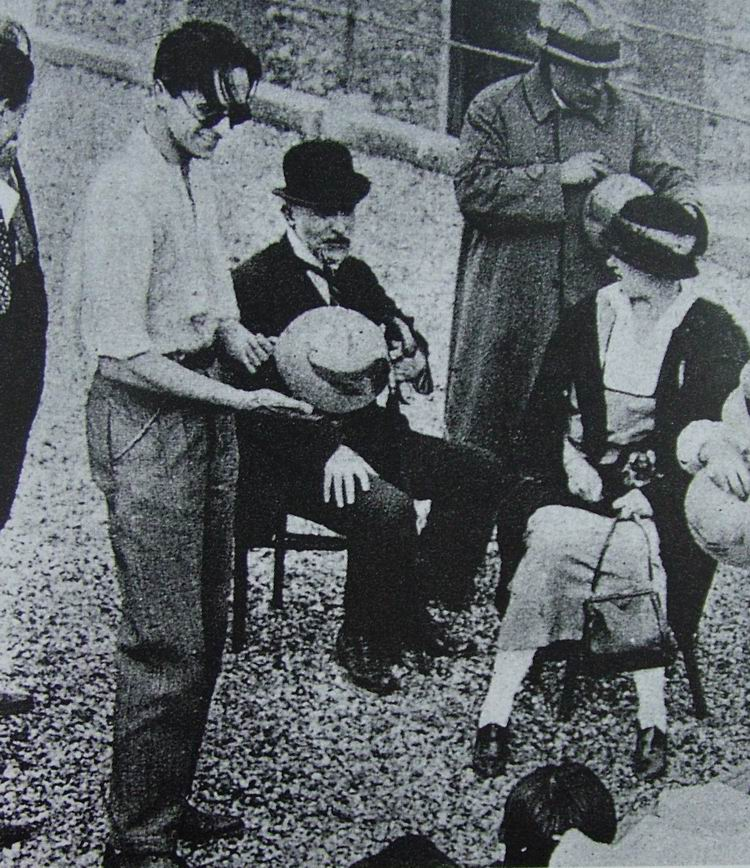
René Clair (left), Jury President

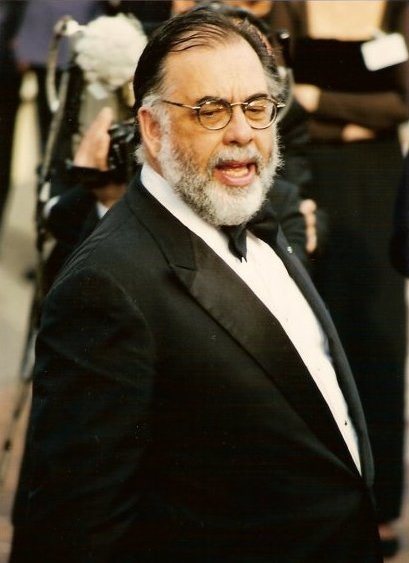
Francis Ford Coppola, Grand Prix International du Festival winner

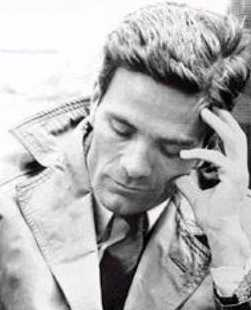
Pier Paolo Pasolini, Grand Prix Spécial du Jury winner

== Independent Awards ==
=== FIPRESCI Prize ===
- Ali: Fear Eats the Soul by Rainer Werner Fassbinder (In competition)
- Lancelot du Lac by Robert Bresson (Out of competition)

=== Commission Supérieure Technique ===
- Technical Grand Prize: Mahler by Ken Russell

=== Prize of the Ecumenical Jury ===
- Ali: Fear Eats the Soul by Rainer Werner Fassbinder
  - Special Mention: The Conversation by Francis Ford Coppola

== Media ==
- INA: Opening of the 1974 Festival (commentary in French)
