= Black Litter =

1977 film

- Film poster
- Spanish: Camada negra
- Directed by: Manuel Gutiérrez Aragón
- Written by: Manuel Gutiérrez Aragón; José Luis Borau
- Produced by: José G. Jacoste
- Starring: José Luis Alonso; Ángela Molina; María Luisa Ponte
- Cinematography: Magín Torruella
- Edited by: José Salcedo
- Music by: José Nieto
- Release date: 29 June 1977 (Berlinale)
- Running time: 89 minutes
- Country: Spain
- Language: Spanish

Black Litter or Black Brood (Spanish: Camada negra) is a 1977 Spanish drama film directed by Manuel Gutiérrez Aragón. In June 1977, it was entered into the 27th Berlin International Film Festival, where Aragón won the Silver Bear for Best Director. The film makes a portrait of extreme right groups in post-Francoist Spain. A central figure in the story is Blanca, matriarchal figure and fascist leader alike.

== Cast ==
- José Luis Alonso as Tatín
- María Luisa Ponte as Blanca
- Ángela Molina as Rosa
- Joaquín Hinojosa as José
- Manuel Fadón as Ramiro
- Manuel Ayuso as Contractor
- José Manuel Cervino as Waiter
- Fernando Chinarro as Veterinarian
- Emilio Fornet as Joaquín
- Carmen Lozano
- Eduardo MacGregor as Maitre
- Petra Martínez as Bookseller
- Antonio Passy as Chorus director
- Pape Pérez
- Marisa Porcel
- Ismael Serrano as Rafita
- Tony Valento as Chorus boy
