= The Little Spanish Soldier =

- Theatrical release poster
- Original title: Soldadito español
- Directed by: Antonio Giménez-Rico
- Screenplay by: Antonio Giménez-Rico; Rafael Azcona
- Starring: Maribel Verdú; Juan Luis Galiardo; María Garralón; Luis Escobar; Miguel A. Rellán; María Luisa San José; Félix Rotaeta; Amparo Baró; José Luis López Vázquez; Francisco Bas
- Cinematography: Federico Ribes
- Edited by: Miguel González Sinde
- Music by: Carmelo Bernaola
- Production company: Penélope PC
- Release date: 7 October 1988
- Country: Spain
- Language: Spanish

The Little Spanish Soldier (Spanish: Soldadito español) is a 1988 Spanish tragicomedy film directed by Antonio Giménez-Rico from a screenplay by Giménez-Rico and Rafael Azcona. It underpins a criticism to the compulsory military service.

== Plot ==
The film follows the mishaps of a young man born to a family closely connected to the military estate who does not want to join the compulsory military service.

== Cast ==
- Maribel Verdú as Marta
- José Luis López Vázquez as Manolo
- María Garralón as Luisa
- Marisa Porcel as Concha
- Juan Luis Galiardo as Paco
- Luis Escobar as Víctor
- Amparo Baró as Lola
- Miguel Rellán as Ángel
- Francisco Bas as Luis
- María Luisa San José as Elena
- Félix Rotaeta
- Ana Álvarez

== Production ==
According to Giménez-Rico the original idea for the story came to him upon a meeting of his promotion of university militia, with the screenplay later penned in tandem with Rafael Azcona. A Penélope production, the film had a reported budget of 150 million Pts. Shooting locations included Alcalá de Henares. The Spanish Little Soldier constitutes an early film depiction of the insubordination to military conscription in Spain.

== Release ==
The film was released theatrically in Spain on 7 October 1988. It also screened at the 9th Mostra de Valencia. It grossed 38,372,395 Pts (107,098 admissions).

== See also ==
- List of Spanish films of 1988
