= María Luisa Ponte =

Spanish actress

- Born: María Luisa Ponte Mancini; 21 June 1918; Medina de Rioseco (Valladolid), Spain
- Died: 2 May 1996 (aged 77); Madrid, Spain
- Occupation: Actress
- Years active: 1952-1995

María Luisa Ponte Mancini (21 June 1918 – 2 May 1996) was a Spanish actress. She appeared in more than 130 films and television shows between 1952 and 1995. She appeared in the 1977 film Black Litter, which was entered into the 27th Berlin International Film Festival.

== Selected filmography ==
- The Great Galeoto (1951)
- Estrella of the Sierra Morena (1952)
- Where Are You Going, Alfonso XII? (1959)
- El Pisito (1959)
- El Cochecito (1960)
- Rogelia (1962)
- Not on Your Life (1963)
- El extraño viaje (1964)
- With the East Wind (1966)
- Road to Rocío (1966)
- The Troublemaker (1969)
- The Love of Captain Brando (1974)
- The Regent's Wife (1975)
- Black Litter (1977)
- Spoiled Children (1980)
- Kargus (1981)
- La colmena (1982)
- La vaquilla (1985)
- Voyage to Nowhere (1986)
- El hermano bastardo de Dios (1986)
