= And Who Are You? =

2007 Spanish film

- Spanish: ¿Y tú quién eres?
- Directed by: Antonio Mercero
- Screenplay by: Antonio Mercero
- Produced by: Miguel Menéndez de Zubillaga
- Starring: Manuel Alexandre; Cristina Brondo; José Luis López Vázquez
- Cinematography: Gonzalo Berridi
- Edited by: José María Biurrun
- Music by: Manuel Villalta
- Production companies: Mono Films; Irusoin
- Distributed by: Buena Vista International
- Release date: 21 September 2007
- Country: Spain
- Language: Spanish

And Who Are You? (Spanish: ¿Y tú quién eres?) is a 2007 Spanish drama film directed by Antonio Mercero, which stars Manuel Alexandre, Cristina Brondo, and José Luis López Vázquez. The film, Mercero's swan song, tackles the Alzheimer's disease.

== Plot ==
The film's story is about the Rivero family, which goes on vacation, leaving their daughter Ana, who is studying for a competitive examination, and grandfather Ricardo, in Madrid. Ricardo is accommodated in a nursing home during this period. At the residence, Ricardo meets Andrés, his roommate and new friend, and they reminisce about their youth together, leading to tender and amusing episodes. During the course of the summer, Ricardo is beset by Alzheimer's disease.

== Cast ==
- Manuel Alexandre as Ricardo
- Cristina Brondo as Ana
- José Luis López Vázquez as Andrés
- Álvaro de Luna as Luis
- Monti Castiñeiras
- Amparo Moreno
- Ángeles Macua
- Alejandro Zafra
- Luis Ángel Priego

== Production ==
The filming took place between Madrid and San Sebastián. The film's release date coincided with the international's day of the degenerative disease. During the filming the therapist to whom the film is dedicated to and director's advisor discovered that Mercero had its first symptoms. Mercero would be diagnosed with Alzheimer's disease. It was his last film as well as José Luis López Vázquez'.

== Reception ==
Televisión Española organized a colloquium about the film after the director's death in 2018.

== See also ==
- List of Spanish films of 2007
