= The Marriage Revolution =

- Directed by: José Antonio Nieves Conde
- Written by: Rafael Azcona; Antonio Martínez Ballesteros
- Starring: Analía Gadé; José Luis López Vázquez; Ismael Merlo
- Cinematography: Antonio L. Ballesteros
- Edited by: José Antonio Rojo
- Music by: Juan Pardo
- Production company: José Frade Producciones
- Release date: 1974
- Running time: 87 minutes
- Country: Spain
- Language: Spanish

The Marriage Revolution (Spanish:La revolución matrimonial) is a 1974 Spanish comedy film directed by José Antonio Nieves Conde and starring Analía Gadé, José Luis López Vázquez and Ismael Merlo.

== Cast ==
- Analía Gadé as Begoña / Cuqui
- José Luis López Vázquez as Pedro
- Ismael Merlo as Padre de Begoña
- Pedro Alonso as Pedrito
- Ketty de la Cámara as Doña Felicitas
- Terele Pávez as Secretaria de Pedro
- Víctor Israel as Dentista
- Rafael Hernández as Taxista
- Alberto Fernández as Aparejador
- Eduardo Calvo as Borracho
- Nené Morales as Chica alta
- Concha Rabal as Maruja
- Monika Kolpek as Pepa
- Blaki as Álvarez
- Marisa Bell as Enfermera del dentista

== Bibliography ==
- Pascual Cebollada & Luis Rubio Gil. Enciclopedia del cine español: cronología. Ediciones del Serbal, 1996.
