= The Executioner (1963 film) =

- Poster
- Directed by: Luis García Berlanga
- Screenplay by: Luis García Berlanga; Rafael Azcona; Ennio Flaiano
- Story by: Luis García Berlanga; Rafael Azcona
- Produced by: Naga Films; Zebra Films
- Starring: Nino Manfredi; Pepe Isbert; Emma Penella; José Luis López Vázquez
- Cinematography: Tonino Delli Colli
- Edited by: Alfonso Santacana
- Music by: Miquel Asins Arbó
- Release date: 1963
- Running time: 90 minutes
- Countries: Spain; Italy
- Language: Spanish

The Executioner (Spanish: El verdugo, Italian: La ballata del boia), also known as Not on Your Life, is a 1963 Spanish-Italian satirical dark comedy film co-written and directed by Luis García Berlanga. It was filmed in black and white, and is widely considered a classic of Spanish cinema. The film won several awards, both in Spain and internationally.

== Plot ==
Amadeo, an executioner in Madrid, meets José Luis, a funeral parlour employee who is going to pick up the prisoner that Amadeo has just executed. José Luis cannot find a girlfriend, since all girls leave him when they find out that he works in a funeral parlour. Amadeo's daughter, Carmen, cannot find a boyfriend, because all the candidates leave when they find out that her father is an executioner. Carmen and José Luis get to know each other and start a relationship that they declare to Amadeo when Carmen becomes pregnant.

Amadeo hopes that the government will give him a flat (given that he is a civil servant), but they refuse it because by the time they give it to him, he will be retired. He and his daughter trick José Luis into accepting the role of executioner to keep the housing, assuring him that he won't have to kill anybody. When an order arrives for an execution in Mallorca, José Luis is horrified and wants to resign, but this would mean losing the flat and returning the salary he has earned. Amadeo and Carmen tell him to wait until the final moment, since the prisoner is ill and will surely die before being executed. In the end, José Luis is dragged to the execution in despair, as if he were the convict instead of the executioner.

== Cast ==
- Nino Manfredi as José Luis Rodríguez, the undertaker
- Emma Penella as Carmen, the daughter of Amadeo
- José Isbert as Amadeo, the executioner (as Jose Isbert)
- José Luis López Vázquez as Antonio Rodríguez, the older brother of José Luis
- Ángel Álvarez as Álvarez, an undertaker, Rodríguez's colleague (as Angel Alvarez)
- Guido Alberti as director of the prison
- Julia Caba Alba as Mujer visitante de la obra nº 2
- María Luisa Ponte as Estefanía (as Maria Luisa Ponte)
- María Isbert as Ignacia (as Maria Isbert)
- Erasmo Pascual
- Xan das Bolas as Guarda de la obra
- José Orjas (as Jose Orjas)
- José María Prada (as Jose Maria Prada)
- Félix Fernández as Monaguillo nº 2 (as Felix Fernandez)
- Antonio Ferrandis

== Production ==
Berlanga wrote the screenplay in 1961; he got inspiration by the 1959 execution of poisoner Pilar Prades Expósito in Valencia, unwillingly carried out by the executioner Antonio López Sierra, who did not want to execute a woman. He was encouraged with brandy and dragged into carrying his "job". One of the lawyers present was a friend of Berlanga's and told him about the unusual execution. The film was shot between 15 April and 6 July 1963 at C.E.A. Studios in Madrid.

== Reception ==
The film won the FIPRESCI Prize at the Venice Film Festival in 1963. At the time, Francoist Spain was under international pressure because of the death sentences for the Communist leader Julián Grimau and for anarchists Francisco Granados e Juliàan Delgado, which had been carried a few weeks before the festival. The Spanish ambassador to Italy, Sánchez Vega, criticized the film accusing it of being "one of the most sweeping acts of defamation ever directed against Spain; an astonishing political pamphlet, not against the regime but against an entire society".

For his performance, Nino Manfredi got his first Nastro d'Argento nomination as best actor.

The film took an estimated gross of ₧ 4,107,300 in Spain and there were some 32,907 viewers in cinemas across the country. In Italy, it was released on 4 March 1964 and grossed 112 million lire.

== See also ==
- Capital punishment in Spain
- Garrote
