= The Garden of Delights =

El jardín de las delicias
- Directed by: Carlos Saura
- Written by: Carlos Saura; Rafael Azcona
- Produced by: Elías Querejeta
- Starring: José Luis López Vázquez
- Cinematography: Luis Cuadrado
- Edited by: Pablo González del Amo
- Music by: Luis de Pablo
- Release date: 5 November 1970 (Spain)
- Running time: 90 minutes
- Country: Spain
- Language: Spanish

El jardín de las delicias, also known as The Garden of Delights in English language cinema, is a 1970 Spanish drama film co-written and directed by Carlos Saura.

The film was censored by contemporary Spanish censorship because of its Franco bourgeois satire and Spanish Civil War references.

== Synopsis ==
Antonio Cano, age 45, is an important businessman who was severely injured in a car accident. Because of this, he is temporarily paralyzed and suffers memory loss. His family, friends and business associates all try to recreate scenes from his life in order to revive his memory which, little by little, does begin to return. Each day Antonio is placed in his beautiful garden where he relives many memories, both real and imagined.

The name is a reference to the Hieronymus Bosch painting The Garden of Earthly Delights.

== Cultural significance ==
All of the striking scene changes and radical imagery are metaphors for the suppression and suffering of Spanish people in Francoist Spain, who could only speak out about their plight by means of allegorical films/stories such as El jardín de las delicias.

== Cast ==
- José Luis López Vázquez as Antonio
- Luchy Soto as Luchy
- Francisco Pierrá as Don Pedro
- Esperanza Roy as Nicole
- Antonio Acebal
- Alberto Alonso as Tony
- Eduardo Calvo
- Antonio Canal as Friend 3
- Lina Canalejas as Tía
- Roberto Cruz
- Ignacio de Paúl
- Luisa Fernanda Gaona
- José Nieto as Friend 1
- Yamil Omar
- Mayrata O'Wisiedo as Nurse
- Julia Peña as Julia
- Luis Peña as Friend
- Marisa Porcel
- Porfiria Sanchíz as (voice) (as Porfiría Sanchís)
- Charo Soriano as Actress
- Gloria Berrocal as (uncredited)
- Geraldine Chaplin as (uncredited), she appears on church
- Luis de Pablo as (uncredited)

== Reception ==
John Simon described The Garden of Delights as a "near masterpiece".
