= The Ancines Woods =

1970 film

- Original Spanish release poster
- Spanish: El bosque del lobo
- Directed by: Pedro Olea
- Written by: Pedro Olea; Juan Antonio Porto
- Based on: El bosque de Ancines by Carlos Martínez-Barbeito
- Produced by: Pedro Olea (uncredited)
- Starring: José Luis López Vázquez; Amparo Soler Leal; Antonio Casas; John Steiner; Nuria Torray
- Cinematography: Aurelio G. Larraya
- Edited by: José Antonio Rojo
- Music by: Antonio Pérez Olea
- Production company: Amboto Producciones Cinematográficas
- Distributed by: Universal Films Española
- Release date: 19 April 1970
- Running time: 87 minutes
- Country: Spain
- Language: Spanish

The Ancines Woods (Spanish: El Bosque del Lobo, lit. 'The Forest of the Wolf' also known as The Wolf's Forest) is a 1970 Spanish drama/horror film co-written, produced, and directed by Pedro Olea. It is based on the novel by Carlos Martínez-Barbeito, and is partially based on the life of Manuel Blanco Romasanta and his alleged lycanthropy.

== Plot ==
The film focuses on Benito Freire, a lonely and miserable peddler whose world is dominated by ignorance and superstition. Wandering through various Galicia towns, he regularly suffers from severe attacks of epilepsy. Rumors about him begin to spread throughout the region, rumors that claim that Benito is both a werewolf and possessed by a demonic spirit. As the rumors about him continue to spread, Benito slowly descends into madness.

== Cast ==
- José Luis López Vázquez as Benito Freire
- Amparo Soler Leal as Pacucha
- Antonio Casas as Abad
- John Steiner as Robert
- Nuria Torray as Avelina
- María Fernanda Ladrón de Guevara as Gabriela
- Alfredo Mayo as Don Nicolás de Valcárcel
- Víctor Israel as Lameiro
- María Vico as Queiruga
- Fernando Sánchez Polack as Vilairo
- Pedro Luis León as Minguiños
- María Arias as Mujer de Nicolás
- Porfiria Sanchíz as Vigaira
- Pilar Vela as Sabina

== Production ==
El Bosque del Lobo is based on Carlos Martínez-Barbeito's 1947 novella El bosque de Ancines. The novella itself was partially based upon the life of Spanish serial killer Manuel Blanco Romasanta, who claimed to have suffered from lycanthropy. Development for the film began in 1969 when producer/director Pedro Olea was searching for his next project after directing his first film Días de viejo color (1968). Dissatisfied with the potential projects he was offered, Olea decided to produce and direct an adaption of Martínez-Barbeito's novella. Actor José Luis López Vázquez was cast to portray the film's main protagonist Benito. López Vázquez, who with the exception of Peppermint Frappé (1967) had mainly starred in comedy of manners films before being cast in the film, would later star in non comedic roles in films such as horror thriller La Cabina (1972).

== Censorship ==
While writing the screenplay for El Bosque del Lobo, writer/director Olea was forced to tone down the novel's more explicit violence and negative portrayal of religion in order to avoid possible censorship, stating in an interview with Nuestro cine that, criticism had to be 'more indirect, subterranean, more through the tone of the films than the concrete situations they reflect'. In spite of this, the film was subject to censorship and was denounced by Spanish critics for its perceived anti-religious message and its denouncement of Spanish society of the time. It also received minor controversy when Admiral Carrero Blanco tried to prohibit the film from being released, after viewing the film in a private screening.

Film historian Román Gubern stated that "while the censors allowed the screening of graphic 'bloodsheds performed by British and Spanish Draculas', El Bosque del Lobo was made more palatable by severely softening the depiction of violence and brutality, therefore neutralizing the critique contained in the novel's 'study of criminal anthropology'".

== Release ==
=== Theatrical release ===
El Bosque del Lobo premiered at the Valladolid International Film Festival in April 1970. The film was later screened in the United States at the Chicago International Film Festival in November 1971. It was later released theatrically in Spain on April 22, 1971. It was a critical and commercial success upon its initial release. The film was later screened on August 10, 2012; as a part of a tribute to writer/director Olea organized by the Concello de A Bola and the Vicente Risco Foundation.

=== Home media ===
In 2023, Vinegar Syndrome made the film available on Blu-ray as part of their Villages of the Damned: Three Horrors from Spain, featuring it alongside similarly-themed folk horror films Beatriz (1976) and The Sky is Falling (1975).

=== Critical response and legacy ===
Modern reassessment of El bosque del lobo has been mostly positive, with critics now praising López Vázquez's performance and Olea's direction. In their book Performance and Spanish Film; authors Dean Allbritton, Alejandro Flórez Melero, and Tom Whittaker praised Vázquez's performance, writing, "In dramatically reshaping his usual intonation and diction for the role, López Vázquez's voice becomes snarling and inarticulate. His ramshackle appearance was as much of a radical departure as his vocal performance".

The film was not without its detractors. Antonio Méndez from AlohaCriticón.com gave the film a negative review, writing, "It could be interesting, but the plot is poor, it lacks strength, it has a love subframe and it sins of a scarce psychological treatment that focuses more on superfluous facts than on the sickly and interior emphasis of its characters."

The critical and commercial success of El bosque del lobo, brought widespread attention to director Olea, who would later go on to direct a series of films which included the 1992 adaption El maestro de esgrima (The Fencing Master) which received and Oscar nomination for Best Foreign Film.

=== Accolades ===
| Award | Date of ceremony | Category | Recipient(s) and nominee(s) | Result | Ref. |
|---|---|---|---|---|---|
| Chicago International Film Festival | November 25, 1971 | Best Actor | José Luis López Vázquez | Won | |
| Valladolid International Film Festival | April 19, 1970 | San Gregorio Prize | El Bosque del Lobo | Won | |
