= Laly Soldevila =

Spanish actress

Laly Soldevilla
- Born: Eulalia Soldevila Vall; 25 July 1933; Barcelona, Spain
- Died: 12 September 1979 (aged 46); Madrid, Spain
- Occupation: Actress
- Years active: 1955–1979

Eulalia Soldevila Vall (25 July 1933 – 12 September 1979) better known as Laly Soldevila was a Spanish film actress. She appeared in 100 films between 1955 and 1979.

== Selected filmography ==
- You and Me Are Three (1962)
- La gran familia (1962)
- The Troublemaker (1963)
- Forty Degrees in the Shade (1967)
- Long Live the Bride and Groom (1970)
- Growing Leg, Diminishing Skirt (1970)
- La descarriada (1973) as Marga
- The Spirit of the Beehive (1973) as Doña Lucía, the teacher
