= Plácido (film) =

- Spanish film poster
- Directed by: Luis García Berlanga
- Written by: Luis García Berlanga; Rafael Azcona; José Luis Colina; José Luis Font
- Produced by: Alfredo Matas
- Starring: Amelia de la Torre; Mari Carmen Yepes; José María Caffarel; Manuel Alexandre; Elvira Quintillá; José Luis López Vázquez; Cassen; Amparo Soler Leal; Xan Das Bolas; Félix Dafauce
- Cinematography: Francisco Sempere
- Edited by: José Antonio Rojo
- Music by: Miguel Asins Arbó
- Release date: 13 November 1961
- Running time: 85 minutes
- Country: Spain
- Language: Spanish

Plácido [ˈplaθiðo] is a 1961 Spanish black comedy film directed by Luis García Berlanga. It was nominated to the Academy Award as Best Foreign Language Film. It was also entered into the 1962 Cannes Film Festival.

In the film, affluent women in a provincial town organize a Christmas campaign of feeding the poor. They are actually both disgusted by the poor, and treating them as their personal possessions. Meanwhile, the impoverished owner of a motorcycle car tries to find enough money to pay for his vehicle.

== Plot ==
In a small provincial town, a group of "pious" women is fond of ostentatiously practicing charity. They organize a Christmas campaign under the motto "Feed a poor man at your table." In order to support the initiative, the sponsorship of a pot brand is sought, and a group of second-rate artists is invited. The artists have come expressly from the capital and are received enthusiastically at the train station. The humanitarian day is completed with a colorful parade, a public auction of the guests, and a dramatic radio broadcast.

The person in charge of organizing this lavish chain of events is Quintanilla, who has hired Plácido for the occasion, a poor man who must utilize the motorcycle car that he has just acquired and has not yet begun to pay for. The hectic activity in which Plácido is involved prevents him from paying the first payment on the vehicle on time, which expires that same night. From that moment, Placido tries by all means to find a solution to his problem because his vehicle is what he uses to earn a living. However, he is taken from one place to another, involved in a series of unexpected incidents, including a comedy of errors involving an elderly beggar with heart problems.

The film is a race against time to get the money paid before the deadline expires. Berlanga's social satire pokes fun at rich people trying to soothe their consciences by helping a poor person for one day. Along the way, we see their disgust at being near the poor, debates over whether it's better to choose a street person or an elderly poor person, and showing off "their" poor person to their friends as though they were a possession. Berlanga also pokes fun at actors more concerned about photo ops appearing to show them as charitable than actually being charitable.

== Cast ==
- Cassen as Plácido Alonso (credited as Casto Sendra "Cassen")
- José Luis López Vázquez as Gabino Quintanilla
- Elvira Quintillá as Emilia
- Manuel Alexandre as Julián Alonso
- Mario Bustos as (credited as Mario de Bustos)
- María Francés
- Mari Carmen Yepes as Martita (credited as Carmen Yepes)
- Jesús Puche as Don Arturo
- Roberto Llamas
- Amelia de la Torre as Doña Encarna de Galán
- Juan G. Medina
- José María Caffarel as Zapater
- Xan das Bolas as Rivas
- Laura Granados as Erika
- Juan Manuel Simón

== Production ==
The film emerged from a campaign devised by the Franco regime, under the slogan "seat a poor person at your table", aimed at fostering a sense of Christian charity towards the underprivileged in society. However, as Berlanga manages to depict, it actually conceals a means of appeasing bourgeois consciences—a sentiment nowadays addressed by "Christmas solidarity telethons", programs which Berlanga confessed to abhorring. The original concept centered around a Christmas banquet where the wealthy invited the impoverished; the former indulged in chicken breasts while the latter made do with the wings.

As Berlanga tinkered with the script, Rafael Azcona (one of the co-writers of the film alongside José Luis Colina, José Luis Font, and Berlanga) joined the project. Azcona had to journey to Rome during the script's development to acquaint himself with the works of Zavattini, as he was collaborating with various Italian directors during that period.

Initially titled Seat a Poor Person at Your Table, the script underwent a last-minute change due to censorship issues, ultimately named after the main male character.

Filming took place on sets in Manresa, although Berlanga sought to capture natural interiors. However, no affluent individuals granted access, save for a Catalan director, a friend of Berlanga's, who permitted the use of his Barcelona home's dining room.

== Reception ==
Plácido premiered on 13 November 1961, and was met with surprise by the general public and emphatic applause from critics. Víctor Erice remarked, "The film's ultimate goal is to depict the incommunicability among people. For me, Berlanga is fundamentally a romantic," while López Vázquez stated, "Berlanga's films are grotesque, not just reflecting the Spain of the time, but the eternal Spain." El País critic Miguel Ángel Palomo described it as "Berlanga's grand masterpiece, not only a flawless comedy of manners, but also a devastating social portrait." Upon its release, the film faced controversy over its final carol, which laments: "Mother, there's a child at the door, shouting in the cold. Tell him to come in and warm up, for in this land, charity is scarce, has always been, and perhaps always will be."

Plácido has an approval rating of 100% on review aggregator website Rotten Tomatoes, based on 6 reviews, and an average rating of 9/10.

== Accolades ==
In the 17th edition of the Circle of Film Writers Medals, Plácido won the award for Best Film, with Luis García Berlanga receiving recognition as the Best Director, and José Luis López Vázquez clinching the title of Best Supporting Actor. Similarly, in the San Jorge Awards, Plácido secured the accolade for Best Spanish Film, with Luis García Berlanga again honored as Best Director, and José Luis López Vázquez acclaimed as Best Actor. Additionally, at the 34th Academy Awards ceremony, Plácido was nominated for Best Foreign Language Film. The film also garnered two awards from the National Entertainment Union, one of them honoring Manuel Alexandre as Best Supporting Actor.

== See also ==
- List of Christmas films
- List of submissions to the 34th Academy Awards for Best Foreign Language Film
- List of Spanish submissions for the Academy Award for Best Foreign Language Film
