= Long Live the Bride and Groom =

1970 film

- Directed by: Luis García Berlanga
- Written by: Rafael Azcona; Luis García Berlanga
- Produced by: Marciano De La Fuente; Cesáreo González
- Starring: José Luis López Vázquez
- Cinematography: Aurelio G. Larraya
- Edited by: José Luis Matesanz
- Release date: 1970
- Running time: 83 minutes
- Country: Spain
- Language: Spanish

Long Live the Bride and Groom (Spanish: ¡Vivan los novios!) is a 1970 Spanish black comedy film directed by Luis García Berlanga. It was entered into the 1970 Cannes Film Festival.

== Plot ==
Leonardo, an employee of a provincial bank, travels to Costa Brava with his mother to marry Loli, owner of a souvenir shop, with whom he has maintained formal relations for years. Leonardo is a repressed man who has erotic fantasies about young, blonde, foreign women. On his last night as a single man, he decides to go out in search of an adventure.

== Cast ==
- José Luis López Vázquez as Leonardo
- Laly Soldevila as Loli
- José María Prada as Pepito
- Manuel Alexandre as Carlos
- Xavier Vivé
- Teresa Gisbert
- Jane Fellner
- Luis Ciges
- Víctor Israel
