= Rafael Azcona =

Spanish screenwriter (1926–2008)

The Most Excellent Rafael Azcona
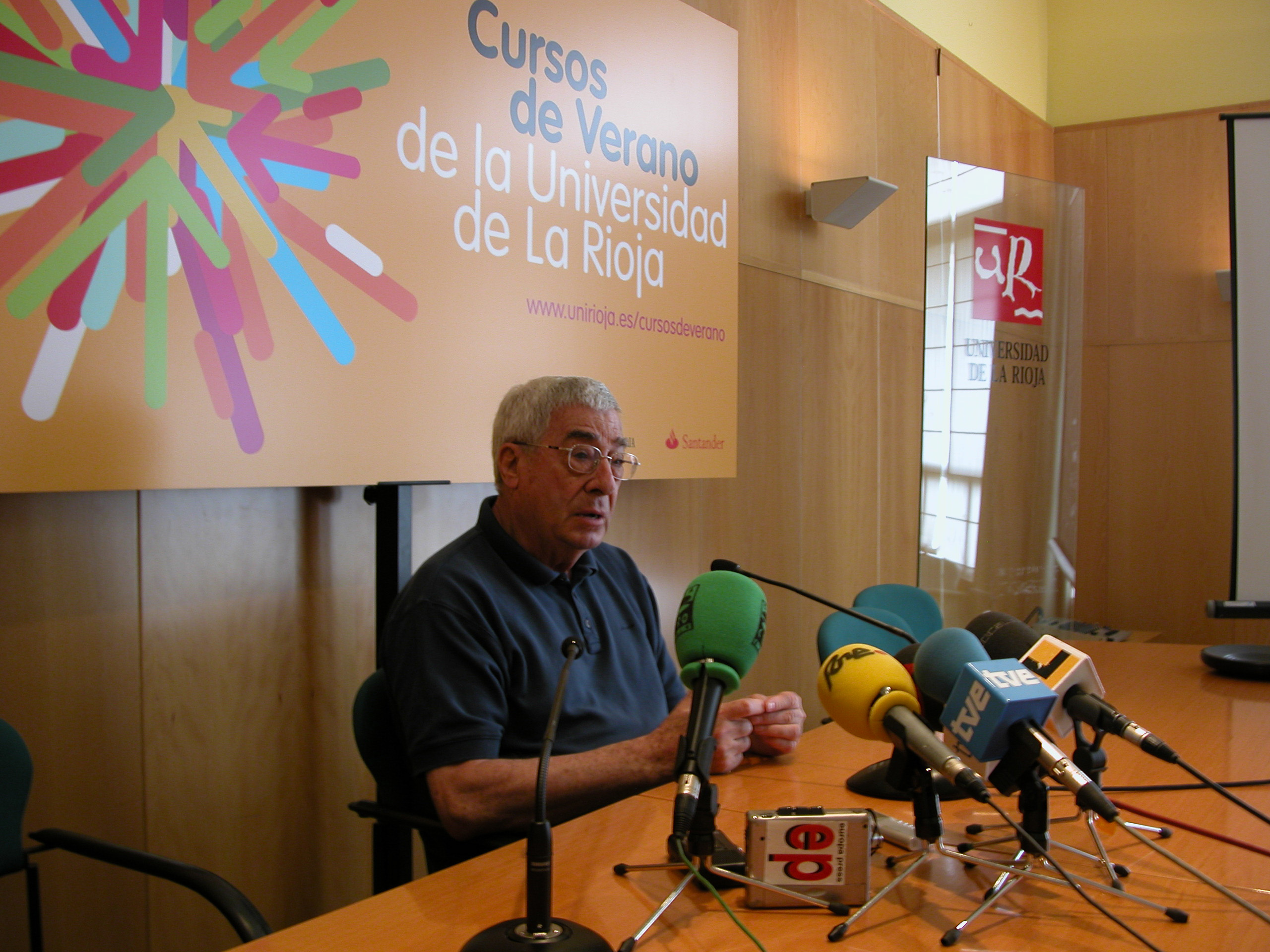
- Azcona in 2006
- Born: Rafael Azcona Fernández; 24 October 1926; Logroño (La Rioja), Spain
- Died: 24 March 2008 (aged 81); Madrid, Spain

Rafael Azcona Fernández (24 October 1926 – 24 March 2008) was a Spanish screenwriter and novelist who worked with some of the best Spanish and international filmmakers. Azcona won five Goya Awards during his career, including a lifetime achievement award in 1998.

He was born in the northern Spanish city Logroño on 24 October 1926. Azcona initially began his career writing for humor magazines. He became known as a screenwriter when he penned the screenplay for the film, El Pisito (The Little Apartment), which was based on his own novel. The 1959 film was directed by Italian film director, Marco Ferreri.

Azcona teamed up with director Fernando Trueba in “Belle Époque,” which won an Academy Award for best foreign film in 1994. He collaborated with other Spanish directors including Luis Garcia Berlanga, Jose Luis Cuerda, José Luis García Sánchez, Pedro Olea, and Carlos Saura. Azcona was also awarded the Gold Medal of Merit in the Fine Arts in 1994.

Rafael Azcona died at his home in Madrid, Spain, on 24 March 2008, at the age of 81.

== Selected filmography as screenwriter ==
- 1959 : El pisito
- 1959 : Se vende un tranvía
- 1960 : El cochecito
- 1961 : Plácido
- 1961 : El secreto de los hombres azules
- 1962 : Mafioso
- 1962 : Three Fables of Love
- 1963 : The Conjugal Bed
- 1963 : The Executioner
- 1964 : The Ape Woman
- 1964 : Un rincón para querernos
- 1964 : Countersex
- 1965 : L'Uomo dei cinque palloni
- 1965 : Kiss the Other Sheik
- 1965 : Marcia nuziale
- 1965 : Run for Your Wife (1965 film)
- 1966 : L'estate
- 1967 : Tuset Street
- 1967 : Peppermint Frappé
- 1967 : Las Pirañas
- 1969 : Honeycomb
- 1970 : Long Live the Bride and Groom
- 1970 : Las secretas intencions
- 1970 : El Monumento
- 1970 : The Garden of Delights
- 1971 : The Audience
- 1971 : El Ojo del huracán
- 1971 : Cross Current
- 1972 : La Cera virgen
- 1972 : It Can Be Done Amigo
- 1972 : A Reason to Live, a Reason to Die
- 1973 : Tarot
- 1973 : Ana and the Wolves
- 1974 : The Marriage Revolution
- 1974 : Don't Touch The White Woman!
- 1974 : Claretta and Ben
- 1974 : La prima Angélica
- 1974 : Grandeur nature
- 1975 : El poder del deseo
- 1975 : Pim, pam, pum... ¡fuego!
- 1976 : The Anchorite
- 1976 : The Last Woman
- 1977 : My Daughter Hildegart
- 1978 : Un hombre llamado Flor de Otoño
- 1978 : Bye Bye Monkey
- 1978 : La escopeta nacional
- 1979 : La miel
- 1979 : La familia, bien, gracias
- 1981 : National Heritage
- 1981 : 127 millones libres de impuestos
- 1982 : Bésame, tonta
- 1982 : Nacional III
- 1983 : Don Chisciotte (TV)
- 1983 : Los desastres de la guerra (TV)
- 1985 : The Heifer
- 1985 : The Court of the Pharaoh
- 1986 : The House Must Be Unmade
- 1986 : Year of Enlightment
- 1987 : The Enchanted Forest
- 1987 : El pecador impecable
- 1987 : Moros y cristianos
- 1988 : Come sono buoni i bianchi
- 1988 : Pasodoble
- 1988 : The Little Spanish Soldier
- 1989 : The Flight of the Dove
- 1989 : Blood and Sand
- 1990 : La Mujer de tu vida: La mujer infiel (TV)
- 1990 : Ay Carmela
- 1992 : Chechu y familia
- 1992 : Belle Époque
- 1993 : Banderas, the Tyrant
- 1994 : La Mujer de tu vida 2: La mujer cualquiera (TV)
- 1995 : Sighs of Spain
- 1995 : El Rey del río
- 1995 : El Seductor
- 1996 : Gran Slalom
- 1997 : Tramway to Malvarrosa
- 1997 : In Praise of Older Women
- 1997 : There Is Always a Right Way
- 1998 : A Perfect Couple
- 1998 : The Girl of Your Dreams
- 1999 : Butterfly's Tongue
- 2000 : Goodbye from the Heart
- 2001 : El paraíso ya no es lo que era
- 2001 : Sound of the Sea
- 2002 : La marcha verde
- 2004 : Franky Banderas
- 2004 : Dearest Maria
- 2008 : The Blind Sunflowers

== Honors ==
- 2007 – Gold Medal of Merit in Labour (Kingdom of Spain, 7 December 2007).
