= Peppermint Frappé =

1967 film by Carlos Saura

- Theatrical release poster
- Directed by: Carlos Saura
- Written by: Carlos Saura; Rafael Azcona; Angelino Fons
- Produced by: Elías Querejeta
- Starring: Geraldine Chaplin; José Luis López Vázquez; Alfredo Mayo
- Cinematography: Luis Cuadrado
- Edited by: Pablo G. del Amo
- Music by: Luis de Pablo
- Production company: Elías Querejeta Producciones Cinematográficas
- Distributed by: Bocaccio Distribución S.A.
- Release date: 9 October 1967
- Running time: 92 minutes
- Country: Spain
- Language: Spanish

Peppermint Frappé is a 1967 Spanish psychological thriller film co-written and directed by Carlos Saura, starring Geraldine Chaplin, José Luis López Vázquez and Alfredo Mayo. The story centers on a man who becomes obsessed with the wife of an old friend, believing her to be a mysterious drummer that he once fell in love with at a festival. He pursues her only to be rebuffed multiple times.

== Plot ==
A pair of hands meticulously crops images from a fashion magazine for a personal scrapbook. The hands belong to an unassuming and conservative physician named Julián. He runs a radiology clinic from his personal residence, assisted by a shy, mild mannered nurse named Ana.

One afternoon, Julián is invited to the house of the mother of his friend Pablo, where a reunion of the two childhood pals has been arranged. Pablo is a charismatic and sophisticated adventurer who has recently returned from Africa with the unexpected news that he has married a beautiful and carefree young woman named Elena. Pablo hands Julián a drink, his favorite cocktail, peppermint frappé, as the group awaits the entrance of Elena, who is upstairs dressing. The sight of the captivating Elena visibly stuns Julián, as Elena reminds him of a mysterious woman he had seen beating drums during the famous Holy Week ritual in the village of Calanda. She insists that she has never seen him before, nor has she ever been to Calanda. Despite her rebukes, Julián finds himself immediately drawn to Elena's cosmopolitan demeanor.

During the days following their first encounter, Julián becomes increasingly infatuated with Pablo's bride and finds pretext to spend time with her. While Pablo is busy, Julián takes Elena sightseeing to Cuenca. Despite her indifference to his attentions, Julián's obsession with Elena does not diminish. Frustrated by his inability to win Elena's affection, Julián turns his attention to his laboratory assistant, Ana, who has secretly pined for Julián. A sexual liaison between the two is soon established. Julián manipulates Ana, coercing her to dress and groom herself like Elena does.

While involved with Ana, Julián continues to pursue the elusive Elena, but she resists his advances with open derision. Julián invites Pablo and Elena to his cottage on the countryside to spend the weekend. He takes them on a tour of the grounds of the abandoned spa where he and Pablo used to play as children.

After a practical joke by Pablo and Elena, aimed at humiliating Julián (Elena showing up with a drum), Julián begins to plan an elaborate revenge against the couple. Picking up Elena's curiosity about his relationship with Ana, Julián invites Elena and Pablo to join him and Ana in his country house.

Before Pablo and Elena arrive, Julián has Ana drugged and, while she is sleeping, places what appears to be the same drug in a decanter containing peppermint frappé. When Pablo and Elena arrive, Julián tells them that Ana will be a little late and offers them the beverage. After a few sips, the couple begins to ridicule Julián once again. When they succumb to the drug, Julián carries their bodies to their car which he causes to roll off a cliff, giving the appearance that the couple had died in an automobile accident. Returning to his country house, Julián finds the place cleared of all incriminating traces and Ana being dressed as the woman of Calanda. The film ends as the two embrace.

== Cast ==
- Geraldine Chaplin as Elena/ Ana/ Woman of Calanda
- José Luis López Vázquez as Julián
- Alfredo Mayo as Pablo
- Ana Maria Custodio as Pablo's mother
- Emiliano Redondo as Arturo
- Fernando Sánchez Polack as patient

== Reception ==
The film was Saura's first significant commercial success. Peppermint Frappé won the Silver Bear for Best Director award at the 18th Berlin International Film Festival. It was listed to compete at the 1968 Cannes Film Festival, which was cancelled due to the events of May 1968 in France.

== Analysis ==
Being a direct homage to Vertigo, Peppermint Frappé uses Julián's obsession with the Hitchcockian blonde woman to illustrate Spain's suppressed fascination with the "foreign" West as well as repressed desires under the nationalist and isolationist regime of Francisco Franco. Furthermore the film is an examination of repression and obsession during Franco's era in Spain. Additionally, the character of Julián's nurse, also played by Chaplin, serves as an interesting example of how a passive feminine character can come to control a more assertive chauvinist by manipulating his desires. In Peppermint Frappé, a single actress and a handful of motifs create a chain of associations whose stylistic sophistication belies the seeming simplicity of the film's linear plotline. Saura intended for the film to be an homage to his mentor, director Luis Buñuel, who was from Calanda.

== Home media ==
Peppermint Frappé is available in Region 2 DVD in Spanish without English subtitles. There is no Region 1 DVD available.
