= El Cochecito =

1960 film

- Directed by: Marco Ferreri
- Written by: Rafael Azcona; Marco Ferreri
- Based on: El Cochecito by Rafael Azcona
- Produced by: Pere Portabella as Pedro Portabella
- Starring: José Isbert; José Luis López Vázquez; Pedro Porcel; Chus Lampreave; María Luisa Ponte; María Isbert
- Cinematography: Juan Julio Baena
- Edited by: Pedro del Rey
- Music by: Miguel Asins Arbó
- Distributed by: Paramount Pictures
- Release date: 3 November 1960
- Running time: 86 minutes
- Country: Spain
- Language: Spanish

El Cochecito (The Wheelchair) is a 1960 Spanish black comedy film directed by Marco Ferreri. The film is based on Rafael Azcona's novel and Azcona co-wrote the script with Ferreri. The film was a huge flop when it was released in Spain, but nowadays is a cult classic. The film had troubles with Spanish censorship, that forced to change and cut the original ending.

== Plot ==
Don Anselmo Proharán (José Isbert) is an old man totally determined to acquire an invalid stroller with a motor, just like the one his friend Lucas and other companions his age have. Despite the opposition of his entire family, Don Anselmo does not give up on his whim, even if to achieve it he is forced to sell the family jewels. When his son Carlos finds out, he forces him to return it. In revenge, Don Anselmo makes the decision to poison his family. When he tries to flee in his stroller, however, he is eventually detained by the Civil Guard.

== Cast ==
- José Isbert as Don Anselmo Proharán
- Pedro Porcel as Carlos Proharán
- José Luis López Vázquez as Alvarito
- María Luisa Ponte as Matilde Proharán
- Lepe as Don Lucas (as Jose A. Lepe)
- Ángel Álvarez as Álvarez
- Antonio Gavilán as Don Hilario
- María Isbert as Andrea
