= Carlos Saura =

Spanish film director and photographer (1932–2023)

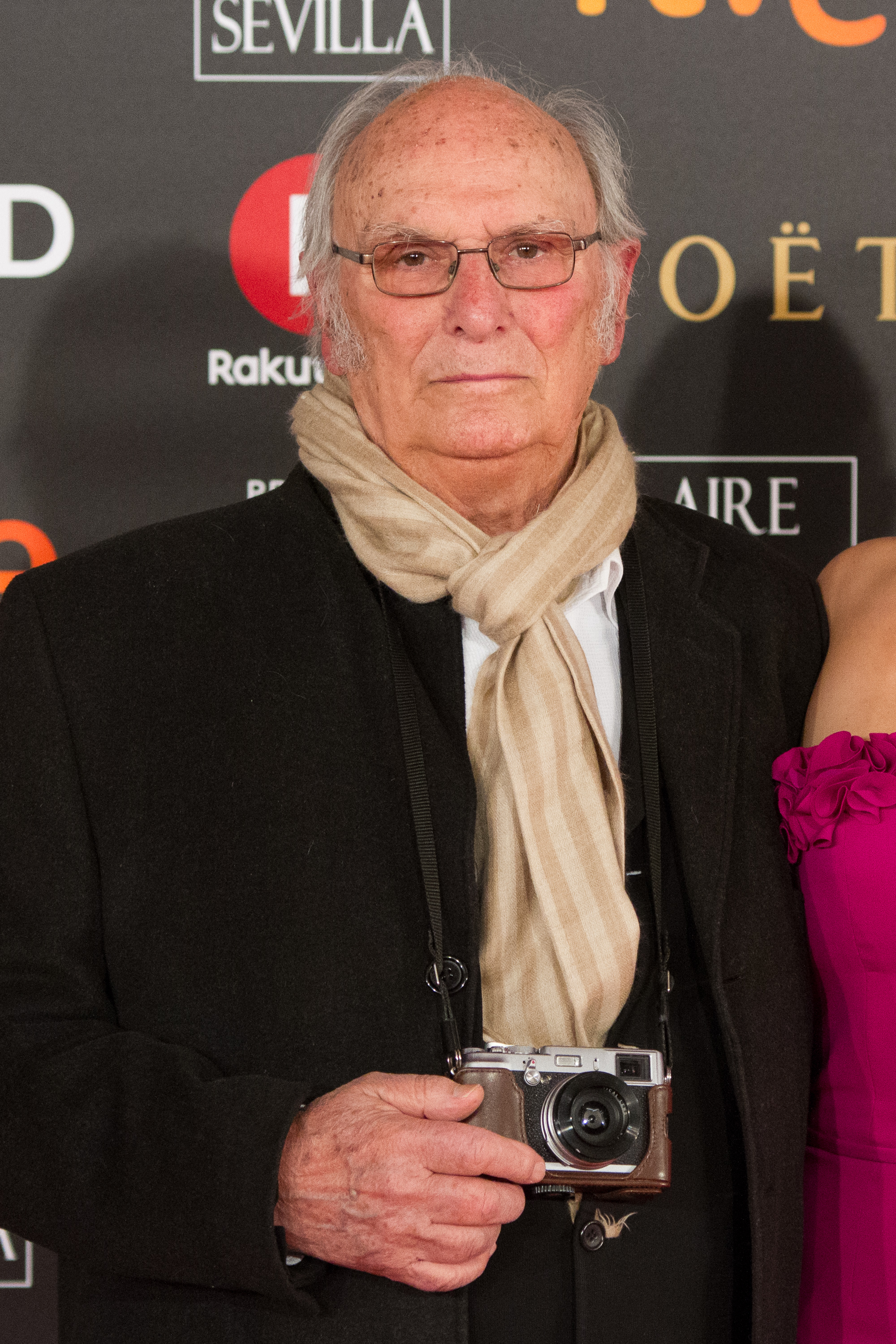
- At the 32nd Goya Awards in 2018
- Born: Carlos Saura Atarés; 4 January 1932; Huesca, Spain
- Died: 10 February 2023 (aged 91); Collado Mediano, Spain
- Occupations: Film director, screenwriter, photographer
- Years active: 1955–2023
- Notable work: Los golfos; The Hunt; Peppermint Frappé; Honeycomb; Ana and the Wolves; Cousin Angelica; Cría Cuervos; Elisa, vida mía; Faster, Faster; Carmen; Tango; Goya in Bordeaux
- Spouses: Adela Medrano; Mercedes Pérez; Eulàlia Ramon (m. 2006)
- Partner: Geraldine Chaplin (1967–1979)
- Children: 7
- Relatives: Antonio Saura (brother)

Carlos Saura Atarés (4 January 1932 – 10 February 2023) was a Spanish film director, photographer and writer. With Luis Buñuel and Pedro Almodóvar, he is considered to be among Spain's great filmmakers. He had a long and prolific career that spanned over half a century, and his films won many international awards.

Saura began his career in 1955 making documentary shorts. He gained international prominence when his first feature-length film premiered at Cannes Film Festival in 1960. Although he started filming as a neorealist, Saura switched to films encoded with metaphors and symbolism in order to get around the Spanish censors. In 1966, he was thrust into the international spotlight when his film The Hunt won the Silver Bear at the Berlin International Film Festival. In the following years, he forged an international reputation for his cinematic treatment of emotional and spiritual responses to repressive political conditions.

By the 1970s, Saura was the best known filmmaker working in Spain. His films employed complex narrative devices and were frequently controversial. He won Special Jury Awards for Cousin Angelica (1973) and Cría Cuervos (1975) in Cannes, and he received an Academy Award for Best Foreign Language Film nomination in 1979 for Mama Turns 100.

In the 1980s, Saura was in the spotlight for his Flamenco trilogy – Blood Wedding, Carmen and El amor brujo, in which he combined dramatic content and flamenco dance forms. His work continued to be featured in worldwide competitions and earned numerous awards. He received two nominations for Academy Awards for Best Foreign Language Film for Carmen (1983) and Tango (1998). In the last two decades of the 20th century, Saura concentrated on works uniting music, dance and images.

== Early life ==
Saura was born in Huesca, Aragon on 4 January 1932. His father, Antonio Saura Pacheco, who came from Murcia, was an attorney and civil servant. His mother, Fermina Atarés Torrente, was a concert pianist. The second of their four children, Carlos had an older brother, Antonio Saura, and two younger sisters, María del Pilar and María de los Ángeles. Antonio became a well-known abstract expressionist painter. From their parents, the four siblings received a liberal understanding education. Because his father worked for the Ministry of the Interior, the Saura family moved to Barcelona, Valencia, and, in 1953, to Madrid. Saura's childhood was marked by the Spanish Civil War, during which the Nationalists fought against the Republicans.

Saura had vivid recollection of his childhood during the war. He later evoked some of them in his films – the games he played, and the songs he sang, as well as darker memories of bombings and hunger, blood and death. He was taught to read by a priest, a relative whom his parents sheltered from anticlerical extremists. At the war's end, Saura was separated from his parents and sent back to Huesca to live with his maternal grandmother and aunts. He described these relatives as "right wings and very religious" who imposed in the child the very antithesis of the liberal education he had received in the republican zone. After having studied civil engineering he began a career in the film industry on the advice of his brother Antonio Saura.

== Career ==
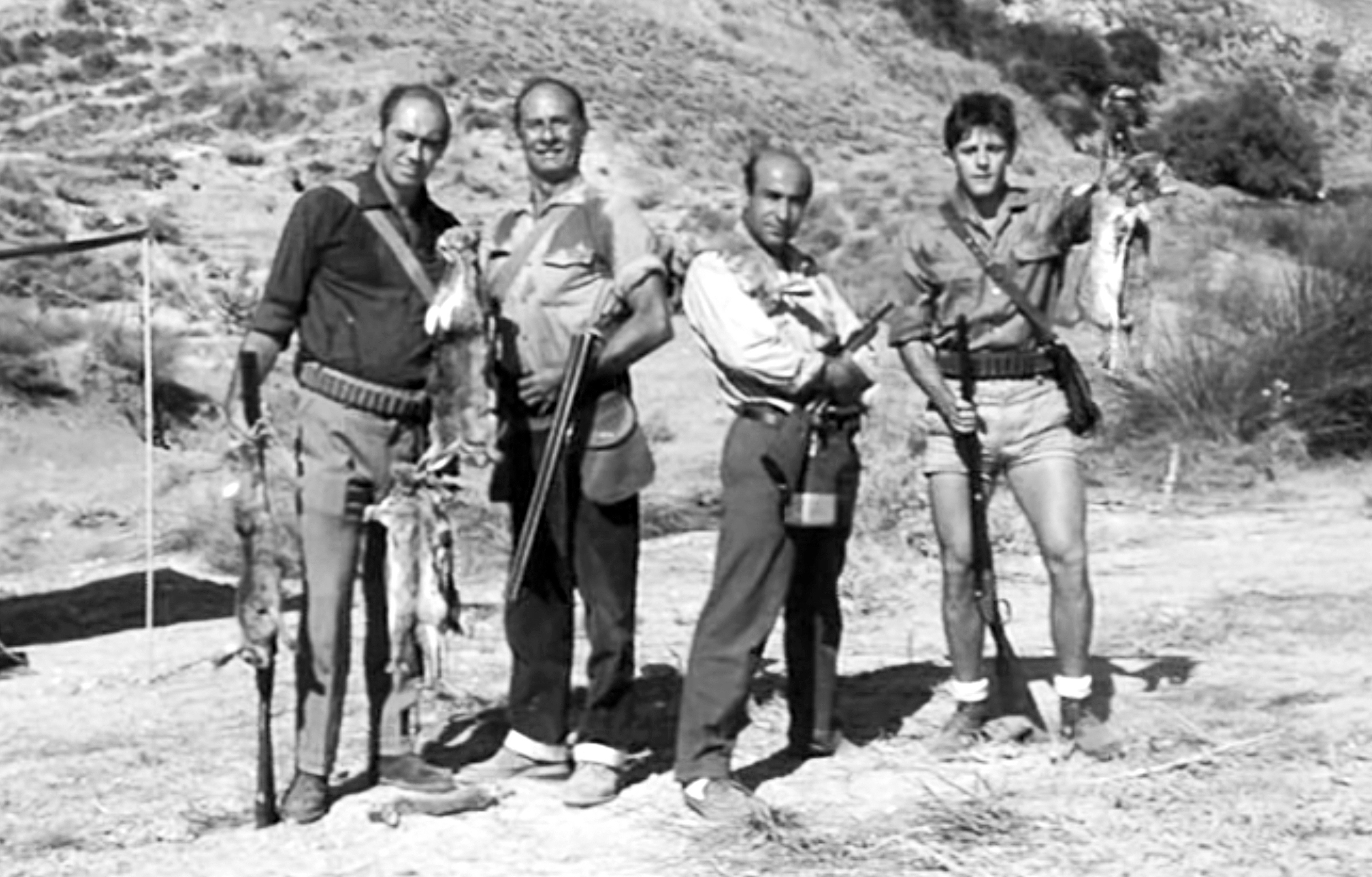
La caza (1966)

During 1957–1958, Saura created Cuenca, his first film. In 1962, his film Los Golfos was recognized for its strong sociological impact in helping Spanish youth by tackling the issue of juvenile delinquency in Madrid's poorest districts. Four years later (1966), he was honored at the 16th Berlin International Film Festival, where he received the Silver Bear for Best Director for his film La caza. In 1967, his film Peppermint Frappé received the Silver Bear for Best Director at the 18th Berlin International Film Festival. He won the Golden Bear in 1981 at the 31st Berlin International Film Festival for his film Deprisa, Deprisa.

The films La prima Angélica (Cousin Angélica) of 1973 and Cría cuervos (Raise Ravens) (Note: From the Spanish popular saying: Cría cuervos y te sacarán los ojos (transl. Raise ravens and they will peck out your eyes.)) of 1975 received the special prize of the jury at the Cannes Film Festival. His film Mamá cumple 100 años was nominated for the Academy Award for Best Foreign Language Film at the 1980 Academy Awards.

Saura become known for movies featuring flamenco and other traditional dances. His Flamenco Trilogy of the 1980s includes Bodas de Sangre (Blood Wedding), Carmen, and El amor brujo featuring the work of Spanish flamenco dancer Cristina Hoyos. He later made the movies Flamenco (1995), Tango (1998), and Fados (2007).

His 1989 film La noche oscura was entered into the 39th Berlin International Film Festival.

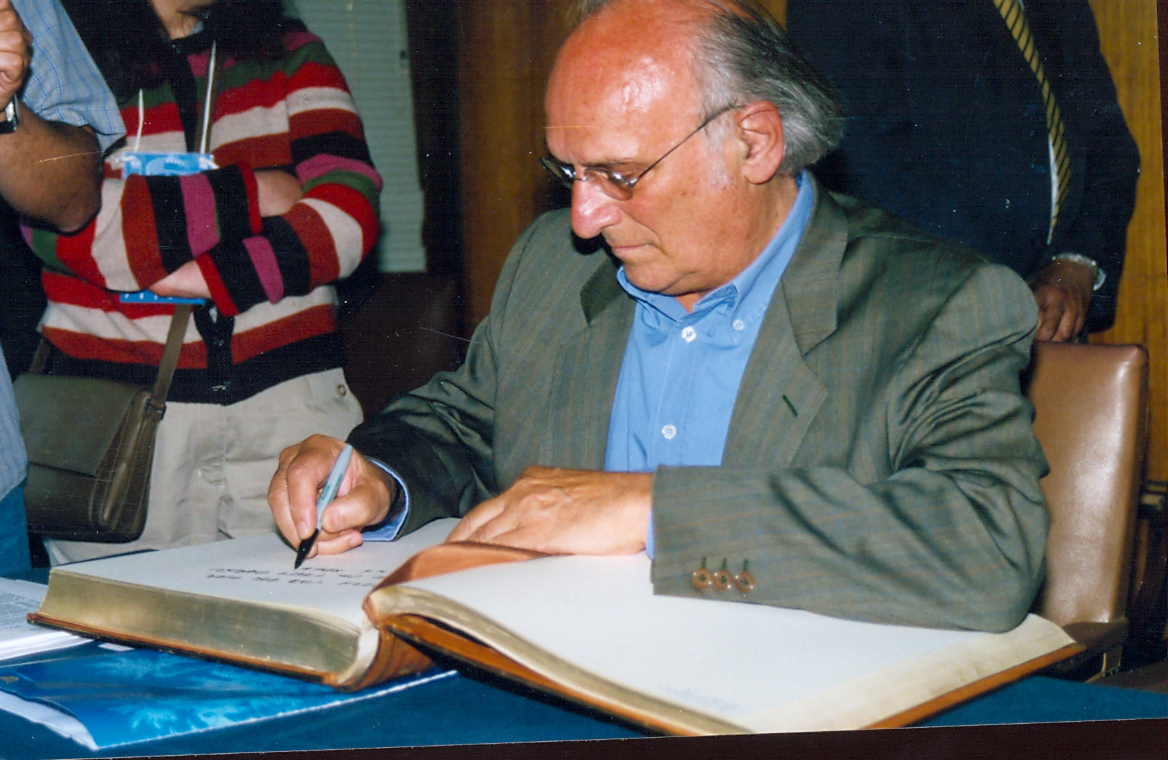
Saura in 2002

Saura considered his film on surrealist master Luis Buñuel to be his best cinematic work. In an interview with an online film magazine, he said about Buñuel y la mesa del rey Salomón (Buñuel and the table of King Solomon – 2001): "That's the greatest film I’ve ever made. I like the film but nobody else seems to like it. I’m sure Buñuel would have loved this film. But perhaps only he would have loved it. Everything you see in the film is actually based on conversations I had with him."

In 1990, he received the Goya Award for the best director and best script for ¡Ay, Carmela!. He was chosen as director for the official film of the 1992 Olympic Games of Barcelona, Marathon (1993).

In 2008, Carlos Saura was honoured with a Global Life Time Achievement Award at the 10th Mumbai International Film Festival, organized by the Mumbai Academy of the Moving Image.

In 2013, he was given a Lifetime Achievement Award at the 18th International Film Festival of Kerala.

== Personal life and death ==
Carlos Saura was married three times. He first married Adela Medrano. They had two sons, Carlos and Antonio. In 1982, he married Mercedes Pérez, with whom he had three sons, Manuel, Adrián, and Diego. Between those two marriages, Saura had a son Shane with actress Geraldine Chaplin. He was the father of a daughter named Anna from his third marriage to actress Eulàlia Ramon, whom he began a relationship in the wake of the shooting of Outrage. They married in 2006. His daughter Anna was his agent (as well as right hand and producer of his films) in his late years.

He was an avid photographer and had a collection of over 600 cameras. His photographs were exhibited several times. He began to take photographs having reached the age of eight years, and later built his own camera by himself and became the photographer of the Granada Film Festival.

Saura was a close friend of fellow Aragonese filmmaker Luis Buñuel. They met at the 1960 Cannes Film Festival.

Saura lived in Collado Mediano since the early 1980s.

Saura died of respiratory failure in his residence of Collado Mediano on 10 February 2023 at the age of 91. He was due to receive the life-achievement Goya honorary award the following day during the 37th Goya Awards.

== Filmography ==
=== Film ===
Short film

| Year | Title | Director | Writer | Notes |
|---|---|---|---|---|
| 1957 | La tarde del domingo | Yes | Yes | |
| 1991 | Oragina Commercial | Yes | No | advertising short made for the experimental compilation film The King of Ads |
| 2021 | Goya: 3 de Mayo | Yes | Yes | |

Feature film

| Year | Title | Director | Writer | Notes |
|---|---|---|---|---|
| 1960 | Los golfos | Yes | Yes | |
| 1963 | Llanto por un bandido | Yes | Yes | |
| 1965 | Muere una Mujer | No | Yes | |
| 1966 | La caza | Yes | Yes | also uncredited co-producer |
| 1967 | Peppermint Frappé | Yes | Yes | |
| 1968 | Stres-es tres-tres | Yes | Yes | |
| 1969 | La madriguera | Yes | Yes | |
| 1970 | El jardín de las delicias | Yes | Yes | |
| 1973 | Ana y los lobos | Yes | Yes | |
| 1974 | La prima Angélica | Yes | Yes | |
| 1976 | Cría cuervos | Yes | Yes | |
| 1977 | Elisa, vida mía | Yes | Yes | |
| 1978 | Los ojos vendados | Yes | Yes | |
| 1979 | Mamá cumple cien años | Yes | Yes | |
| 1981 | Deprisa, Deprisa | Yes | Yes | |
| 1981 | Bodas de sangre | Yes | Yes | |
| 1982 | Dulces horas | Yes | Yes | |
| 1982 | Antonieta | Yes | Yes | |
| 1983 | Carmen | Yes | Yes | also producer |
| 1984 | Los zancos | Yes | Yes | |
| 1986 | El amor brujo | Yes | Yes | |
| 1988 | El Dorado | Yes | Yes | |
| 1989 | La noche oscura | Yes | Yes | |
| 1990 | ¡Ay, Carmela! | Yes | Yes | |
| 1990 | Los Cuentos de Borges: El Sur (TV) | Yes | Yes | |
| 1993 | ¡Dispara! | Yes | Yes | |
| 1996 | Taxi | Yes | No | |
| 1997 | Little Bird (Pajarico) | Yes | Yes | |
| 1998 | Tango | Yes | Yes | |
| 1999 | Goya en Burdeos | Yes | Yes | |
| 2001 | Buñuel y la mesa del rey Salomón | Yes | Yes | |
| 2002 | Salomé | Yes | Yes | |
| 2004 | El séptimo día | Yes | No | |
| 2009 | I, Don Giovanni | Yes | Yes | |
| 2021 | El rey de todo el mundo | Yes | Yes | |

=== Documentary works ===
Short film

| Year | Title | Director | Writer | Notes |
|---|---|---|---|---|
| 1955 | Flamenco | Yes | Yes | also producer and cinematographer |
| 1956 | El pequeño río Manzanares | Yes | Yes | |
| 1958 | Cuenca | Yes | Yes | |
| 2008 | Sinfonía de Aragón | Yes | No | |
| 2021 | Rosa Rosae: La Guerra Civil | Yes | Yes | also editor and artwork |

Film

| Year | Title | Director | Writer | Notes |
|---|---|---|---|---|
| 1992 | Sevillanas | Yes | Yes | |
| 1993 | Marathon | Yes | Yes | |
| 1995 | Flamenco | Yes | Yes | |
| 2005 | Iberia | Yes | Yes | also production designer |
| 2007 | Fados | Yes | Yes | also production designer |
| 2010 | Flamenco, Flamenco | Yes | Yes | |
| 2015 | Zonda, folclore argentino | Yes | Yes | |
| 2016 | Jota de Saura | Yes | Yes | also art director |
| 2018 | Renzo Piano, an Architect for Santander | Yes | Yes | |
| 2022 | Las paredes hablan | Yes | Yes | also actor |

== Selected awards and nominations ==
Academy Awards

- 1980 – Nominated: Best Foreign Language Film – Mamá cumple 100 años
- 1984 – Nominated: Best Foreign Language Film – Carmen
- 1999 – Nominated: Best Foreign Language Film – Tango

BAFTA Award

- 1983 – Won: BAFTA Award for Best Foreign Language Film – Carmen

Berlin Film Festival

- 1964 – Nominated: Golden Berlin Bear – Llanto por un bandido
- 1966 – Won: Silver Bear for Best Director at the 16th Berlin International Film Festival for his film La caza
- 1966 – Nominated: Golden Berlin Bear – La caza
- 1968 – Won: Silver Bear for Best Director at the 18th Berlin International Film Festival for his film Peppermint Frappé
- 1968 – Nominated: Golden Berlin Bear – Peppermint Frappé
- 1969 – Nominated: Golden Berlin Bear – La madriguera
- 1981 – Won: Golden Bear at the 31st Berlin International Film Festival for his film Deprisa, deprisa
- 1989 – Nominated: Golden Berlin Bear – La noche oscura

Camerimage

- 1998 – Won: Special Award (Film Direction with a Special Visual Sensitivity)
- 2009 – Won: Cinematographer-Director Duo Award (shared with Vittorio Storaro)

Cannes Film Festival

- 1960 – Nominated: Golden Palm – Los golfos
- 1973 – Nominated: Golden Palm – Ana y los lobos
- 1974 – Won: Jury Prize at the 1974 Cannes Film Festival for his film La prima Angélica
- 1974 – Nominated: Golden Palm – La prima Angélica
- 1976 – Won: Grand Prix of the Jury at the 1976 Cannes Film Festival for his film Cría cuervos...
- 1976 – Nominated: Golden Palm – Cría cuervos...
- 1977 – Nominated: Golden Palm – Elisa, vida mía
- 1978 – Nominated: Golden Palm – Los ojos vendados
- 1983 – Won: Technical Grand Prize at the 1983 Cannes Film Festival for his film Carmen
- 1983 – Won: Award for Best Artistic Contribution at the 1983 Cannes Film Festival for his film Carmen
- 1983 – Nominated: Golden Palm – Carmen
- 1988 – Nominated: Golden Palm – El Dorado

European Film Awards

- 2004 – Won': Lifetime Achievement Award
- 2008 – Nominated: Best Documentary Award – Fados

Golden Globe Awards

- 1978 – Nominated: Best Foreign Language Film – Cría cuervos...
- 1984 – Nominated: Best Foreign Language Film – Carmen
- 1999 – Nominated: Best Foreign Language Film – Tango

Goya Awards

- 1991 – Won: Goya Award for Best Director – ¡Ay, Carmela!
- 1991 – Won: Goya Award for Best Adapted Screenplay (shared with Rafael Azcona) – ¡Ay, Carmela!
- 2005 – Nominated: Best Director – El 7º día
- 2006 – Nominated: Best Documentary – Iberia
- 2008 – Nominated: Best Documentary – Fados
- 2022 – Won: Honorary Goya Award

Karlovy Vary International Film Festival

- 1982 – Won: Special Prize of the Jury – Bodas de sangre
- 2000 – Won: Special Prize for Outstanding Contribution to World Cinema

Montréal World Film Festival

- 1983 – Won: Most Popular Film of the Festival – Carmen
- 1986 – Won: Prix Special du Festival for his trilogy (Bodas de sangre, Carmen, El amor brujo), on the occasion of the presentation of El amor brujo
- 1995 – Won: Grand Prix Special des Amériques ("On the occasion of the centennial of cinema, for his exceptional contribution to the cinematographic art")
- 1997 – Won: Best Director – Pajarico
- 1997 – Nominated: Grand Prix des Amériques – Pajarico
- 1999 – Won: Prize of the Ecumenical Jury – Goya en Burdeos
- 1999 – Won: Best Artistic Contribution – Goya en Burdeos
- 1999 – Nominated: Grand Prix des Amériques – Goya en Burdeos
- 2002 – Won: Best Artistic Contribution – Salomé
- 2002 – Nominated: Grand Prix des Amériques – Salomé
- 2004 – Won: Best Director – El 7º día
- 2004 – Nominated: Grand Prix des Amériques – El 7º día

San Sebastián International Film Festival

- 1958 – Won: Special Mention – Cuenca
- 1979 – Won: Special Prize of the Jury – Mamá cumple cien años
- 1996 – Nominated: Golden Seashell – Taxi
- 2001 – Nominated: Golden Seashell – Buñuel y la mesa del rey Salomón

Venice Film Festival

- 1968 – Nominated: Golden Lion – Stress-es tres-tres
- 1984 – Nominated: Golden Lion – Los zancos
- 1993 – Nominated: Golden Lion – ¡Dispara!

=== Other awards and honours ===
- 1977 – Won: Prix Léon Moussinac – Best Foreign Film at the French Syndicate of Cinema Critics for his film Cría cuervos...
- 1984 – Won: Best European Film at the 1984 Bodil Awards for his film Carmen
- 1985 – Won: Guild Film Award – Silver: Foreign Film at the Guild of German Art House Cinemas for his film Carmen
- 1991 – Won: ADIRCAE Award – Best Director for his film ¡Ay, Carmela!
- 1999 – Won: Jules Verne Award at the Nantes Spanish Film Festival for his film Pajarico
- 1999 – Won: SDFCS Award – Best Foreign Language Film at the San Diego Film Critics Society AwardsWon: Lifetime Achievement Award at the Los Angeles Latino International Film Festival
- 2002 – Won: Lifetime Achievement Award at the Istanbul International Film Festival
- 2002 – Won: Special Career Award at the Fantasporto
- 2007 – Won: International Award at the Barcelona Film Awards
- 2008 – Won: International Lifetime Achievement Award at the Bombay International Film Festival
- 2011 – Won: Special Award for Lifetime Achievement at the Fotogramas de Plata
- 2013 – Won: Lifetime Achievement Award at the International Film Festival of Kerala
- 2015 – Won: Premio Feroz de Honor
- 2022 – Won': Satyajit Ray Lifetime Achievement Award at the International Film Festival of India.

Cinema Writers Circle Awards, Spain

- 1970 – Won: CEC Award; Best Director – La madriguera.
- 1977 – Won: CEC Award; Best Director – Cría cuervos...
- 1978 – Won: CEC Award; Best Director – Elisa, vida mía
- 1984 – Won: CEC Award; Best Director – Carmen

Sant Jordi Awards

- 1967 – Won: Sant Jordi; Best Film – La caza
- 1968 – Won: Sant Jordi; Best Film – Peppermint Frappé
- 1972 – Won: Sant Jordi; Best Film – El jardín de las delicias
- 1975 – Won: Sant Jordi; Best Film – La prima Angélica
- 2000 – Won: Sant Jordi; Best Film – Goya en Burdeos
