= Eduardo Gómez (actor) =

Spanish actor (1951–2019)

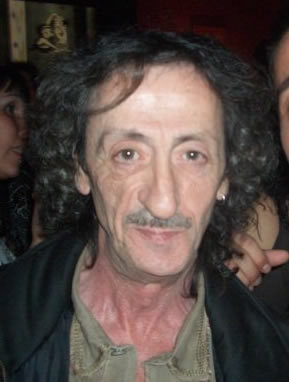
- Eduardo Gómez in 2010
- Born: Eduardo Gómez Manzano; 27 July 1951; Madrid, Spain
- Died: 28 July 2019 (aged 68); Madrid, Spain
- Occupation: Actor
- Children: 1

Eduardo Gómez Manzano (27 July 1951 – 28 July 2019) was a Spanish actor who was born in Madrid, Spain.

== Early life and career ==
Gómez began acting late in life. In his early forties, he was accompanying a friend to a shooting. The production team persuaded him to say a few phrases to the camera. Andrés Pajares, a comedian and actor, saw him during the production and asked him whether he acted. Gómez answered that he was not an actor but if he paid him, he would act. Of the experience, Gómez has said, "The next day I went, he paid me and to this day! [...] What has happened to me doesn't happen to many people. I'm very happy."

He went on to perform in small parts in Spanish television and cinema, including parts in the Goya Award-winning movies La comunidad and La lengua de las mariposas. He later appeared in a sequel of Santiago Segura's Torrente series, Torrente 3: El Protector. He also had a part in the movie version of the legendary Spanish comic strip Mortadelo y Filemón.

He was cast in the part of Emilio's father in the hit Spanish comedy Aquí no hay quien viva. Originally a small, recurring role, Gómez joined the regular cast after the first series and his character of Mariano is now widely recognized in Spain for which he won Best Actor on Unión de Actores y Actrices. He then played Maxi in La que se avecina from 2007 to 2013.

In 2013 he parodied Capitán Alatriste in Spanish Movie along Alexandra Jiménez, Carlos Areces, Joaquín Reyes and Michelle Jenner. In February 2015 he was cast as Juanito in the Cuatro TV program Gym Tony along Carmen Ruiz and Pepa Rus.

He appeared posthumously in the TV programme Trabajo temporal.

== Private life and death ==
Gómez had one son, Héctor, from a previous marriage. He was an Atlético de Madrid fan.

He died on 28 July 2019 from laryngeal cancer, one day after his 68th birthday. The funeral was assisted by his friends Alberto, Laura Caballero, Nacho Guerreros, Cristina Castaño, Vanesa Romero, Nathalie Seseña, Malena Alterio, Laura Pamplona, Melani Olivares, and Fernando Ramallo. He was cremated in La Almudena.

== Partial filmography ==
- 1998 El milagro de P. Tinto
- 1999 Muertos de risa
- 1999 La lengua de las mariposas
- 2000 La comunidad
- 2002 El oro de Moscú
- 2002 800 Balas
- 2003 La gran aventura de Mortadelo y Filemón
- 2003-2006 Aquí no hay quien viva
- 2004 El chocolate del loro
- 2004 Crimen ferpecto
- 2005 Torrente 3: El Protector
- 2007-2013 La que se avecina
- 2010 Entrelobos
- 2021 Makoki: A Deadly Love
