= Alpha Males (TV series) =

Spanish comedy television series

- Spanish: Machos Alfa
- Genre: Comedy
- Created by: Alberto Caballero; Laura Caballero
- Written by: Alberto Cabellero; Laura Caballero; Daniel Deorador; Araceli Álvarez de Sotomayor; Carla Nigra
- Directed by: Laura Caballero
- Starring: Fernando Gil; María Hervás; Raúl Tejón; Kira Miró; Gorka Otxoa; Paula Gallego; Fele Martínez; Raquel Guerrero
- Country of origin: Spain
- Original language: Spanish
- No. of seasons: 5
- No. of episodes: 42

Production
- Cinematography: Juan Luis Cabellos
- Editors: Óscar Romero; Marta Salas; Jaime Segi-Vela
- Running time: 31–40 minutes
- Production company: Contubernio Films

Original release
- Network: Netflix
- Release: 30 December 2022 – present

Alpha Males (Machos Alfa) is a Spanish comedy television series created by brother-and-sister team Alberto and Laura Caballero for Netflix. It stars Fernando Gil, María Hervás, Raúl Tejón, Kira Miró, Gorka Otxoa, Paula Gallego, Fele Martínez, and Raquel Guerrero, and was produced by the Caballero siblings' own production company, Contubernio Films. The show premiered on 30 December 2022. In January 2023, it was renewed for a second season, which aired on 9 February 2024. The third season was released on 10 January 2025. The series was subsequently renewed for a fourth and fifth season, with the former coming out on 9 January 2026. The fifth season was released on 17 April 2026. In April 2026, it was announced that a sixth and final season was in production.

== Synopsis ==
The series follows four male friends in their forties who begin to notice their male privilege disappearing with social change and the empowerment of women, and they are forced to adapt, each in their own way.

In the first season, the four take a course on "deconstructing masculinity", and the way this affects their perceptions is an underlying theme throughout the show.

== Cast and characters ==
Main

- Gorka Otxoa as Santi Peralta, a trained architect who is bored in his surveying job. Álex arranges for him to go on multiple Tinder dates to help him get over his ex-wife Blanca, triggering his interest in the "deconstructing masculinity" course.
- Fele Martínez as Luis Bravo, a police officer who works mostly on traffic offences. He is married to Esther, with two children, but the challenges of modern parenthood are taking a toll on his marriage.
- Fernando Gil as Pedro Aguilar, a TV producer. The wealthiest of the four, his life is thrown into disarray in the first episode, when he is fired in favour of a woman, making him financially dependent on his girlfriend Daniela.
- Raúl Tejón as Raúl Camacho, a restaurauteur. The most immature of the four friends, his masculinity is affronted when Luz asks him for an open relationship. Although he is incapable of coping without Luz, he is also frequently unfaithful to her.
- Paula Gallego as Álex, Santi and Blanca's daughter, aged 17 in the first season. She lives with Santi and is intelligent and open-minded about sex, encouraging him to date more extensively.
- Raquel Guerrero as Esther, Luis's wife and mother of their two children. She dislikes her job as a driving instructor and is frustrated about the decline of her sex life. In the third season, she begins pursuing her dream of acting and stand-up comedy, with mixed results.
- María Hervás as Daniela Galván, a successful influencer and Pedro's girlfriend. Her lifestyle presents challenges to his traditional attitudes.
- Kira Miró as Luz, a divorce lawyer and Raúl's girlfriend. She is much more intelligent, successful, and adventurous than Raúl, which causes problems in their relationship.
- Karol Luna as Patricia, Pedro and Daniela's Peruvian maid. She is very loyal to her employers (especially Daniela) and works to repair their relationship when they experience difficulties. In the second season, she gets pregnant with Stefan, causing major domestic complications.
- Santi Millán as Patrick, he runs the "deconstructing masculinity" course that the four friends attend in the first season. In the second season, the friends (principally Santi) continue to ask him for advice, to his increasing annoyance.
- Víctor Massán as Diego, the group's "gay friend", who suggests Patrick's course to them. In the second season, he opens a restaurant with Raúl.
- Cayetana Cabezas as Blanca, Álex's mother and Santi's ex-wife. Disorganised and irresponsible, she is disengaged from Álex's life but still heavily dependent on Santi.
- Paloma Bloyd as Irene, a feminist journalist who becomes Santi's love interest in the third season.
- Gabriel Alvarez as Ulises, Luis and Esther's son. Luis constantly worries about setting a good example for his son, and his attempts to share "deconstructed" ideals often clash with Esther's more traditional approach.
- Leire Marin Vara as Iris/Jacobo, Luis and Esther's younger child, aged 8–9. In the third season, they begin identifying as a boy and adopt the name "Jacobo", later returning to identifying as a girl.
- Pep Sais as Joaquin, Luis's father. He comes to live with Luis and Esther in the third season, after his wife throws him out. His misogynistic ideas clash with Luis's and Iris/Jacobo's more progressive attitudes.
- Nacho Rubio as Jero, Raúl's business partner at his restaurant. At the end of the first season, Luz sells him Raúl's share for one euro out of spite.
- Silvia Marty as Carmen, Jero's wife. She and Raúl have been having an affair prior to the start of the series.
- Victor Hassan as Stefan, Pedro's Bulgarian "maid", whom he recruits when Daniela and Patricia move out. After they move back in, he has an affair with Patricia, resulting in her pregnancy, before Pedro catches him with another woman and fires him.
- Begoña Maestre as Virginia, Pedro's new boss in the third season, taking over as CEO after he is demoted. She has a strong dislike for Pedro.

== Production ==
The series concept was created shortly after the end of the lockdown imposed due to the COVID-19 pandemic. After completing filming for the twelfth season of La que se avecina, and given the impossibility of resuming the third season of El pueblo due to the difficulty of traveling between autonomous communities, the Caballero siblings, together with co-writers Daniel Deorador and Araceli Álvarez de Sotomayor, began to develop ideas for a new series. The team decided to create a show about middle-aged men's reactions to social changes. With the permission of Mediaset España, who co-owned Contubernio Films, the four writers brought the series to Netflix, who had already shown interest in collaborating with the Caballero siblings.

Alpha Males was first announced in March 2022, as the first series by the Caballeros exclusively for a streaming platform. In July 2022, the show's cast was revealed, and it was confirmed that filming had completed.

Ahead of the release of season 3, the show was renewed for a fourth season, which completed filming in July 2025. A German adaptation was also announced. There are also French, Dutch, and Italian adaptations in production.

== Release ==
On 21 November 2022, Netflix released the first images from the series and confirmed that it would premiere on its platform on 30 December 2022.

In January 2023, the series was renewed for a second season, which premiered on 9 February 2024. On 14 February, it was reported that a third season was due to begin filming in March 2024; it premiered on 10 January 2025. The series was renewed for a fourth season, which premiered on 9 January 2026.

== Episode list ==
Series	Episodes	Originally released
1	10	30 December 2022
2	10	9 February 2024
3	10	10 January 2025
4	6	9 January 2026
5	6	17 April 2026

=== Season 1 ===
No. overall	No. in season	Title	Directed by	Written by	Original release date
1	1	"Deconstructing" (En deconstrucción)	Laura Caballero	Alberto Caballero, Daniel Deorador, Araceli Álvarez de Sotomayor, Laura Caballero, Carla Nigra	30 December 2022
2	2	"Life's What Absorbs You" (Lo que te absorbe es la vida)	Laura Caballero	Alberto Caballero, Daniel Deorador, Araceli Álvarez de Sotomayor, Laura Caballero, Carla Nigra	30 December 2022
3	3	"Toxic Masculinity" (Masculinidad tóxica)	Laura Caballero	Alberto Caballero, Daniel Deorador, Araceli Álvarez de Sotomayor, Laura Caballero	30 December 2022
4	4	"Ibizan Herbs" (Hierbas ibicencas)	Laura Caballero	Alberto Caballero, Daniel Deorador, Araceli Álvarez de Sotomayor, Laura Caballero	30 December 2022
5	5	"Sensitive Heteroflexibles" (Heteroflexibles sensibles)	Laura Caballero	Alberto Caballero, Daniel Deorador, Araceli Álvarez de Sotomayor, Laura Caballero	30 December 2022
6	6	"Look What You've Done" (La que has liado)	Laura Caballero	Alberto Caballero, Daniel Deorador, Araceli Álvarez de Sotomayor, Laura Caballero	30 December 2022
7	7	"When Was the Last Time You Cried?" (¿Cuándo lloraste por última vez?)	Laura Caballero	Alberto Caballero, Daniel Deorador, Araceli Álvarez de Sotomayor, Laura Caballero	30 December 2022
8	8	"Just When We Were Doing So Well" (Con lo bien que estábamos)	Laura Caballero	Alberto Caballero, Daniel Deorador, Araceli Álvarez de Sotomayor, Laura Caballero	30 December 2022
9	9	"The Moses of Sexist Pigs" (El Moisés de los machirulos)	Laura Caballero	Alberto Caballero, Daniel Deorador, Araceli Álvarez de Sotomayor, Laura Caballero	30 December 2022
10	10	"Either the Course Is a Failure, or We Are" (O falla el temario o fallamos nosotros)	Laura Caballero	Alberto Caballero, Daniel Deorador, Araceli Álvarez de Sotomayor, Laura Caballero	30 December 2022

=== Season 2 ===
No. overall	No. in season	Title	Directed by	Written by	Original release date
11	1	"I Feel Kind of Deconstructed" (Me siento como... deconstruido)	Laura Caballero	Alberto Caballero, Daniel Deorador, Carla Nigra	9 February 2024
12	2	"You Have Dreams?" (¿Tú tienes sueños?)	Laura Caballero	Alberto Caballero, Daniel Deorador, Carla Nigra, Laura Caballero	9 February 2024
13	3	"The Other Way Around" (Dale la vuelta)	Laura Caballero	Alberto Caballero, Daniel Deorador, Carla Nigra	9 February 2024
14	4	"Ask Before You Enter" (Pregunta antes de entrar)	Laura Caballero	Alberto Caballero, Daniel Deorador, Carla Nigra	9 February 2024
15	5	"Don't Go Falling in Love" (No te putopilles)	Laura Caballero	Alberto Caballero, Daniel Deorador, Carla Nigra	9 February 2024
16	6	"On a Monday?" (¿Un lunes?)	Laura Caballero	Alberto Caballero, Daniel Deorador, Carla Nigra, Laura Caballero	9 February 2024
17	7	"The Brotherhood" (Los chicos de la hermandad)	Laura Caballero	Alberto Caballero, Daniel Deorador, Carla Nigra, Laura Caballero	9 February 2024
18	8	"I'm Straight" (Soy hetero)	Laura Caballero	Alberto Caballero, Daniel Deorador, Carla Nigra, Laura Caballero	9 February 2024
19	9	"What Does It Mean to Be a Woman?" (¿Qué es ser mujer?)	Laura Caballero	Alberto Caballero, Daniel Deorador, Carla Nigra, Laura Caballero	9 February 2024
20	10	"The One Time We're All Together" (Para una vez que nos juntamos...)	Laura Caballero	Alberto Caballero, Daniel Deorador, Carla Nigra, Laura Caballero	9 February 2024

=== Season 3 ===
No. overall	No. in season	Title	Directed by	Written by	Original release date
21	1	"Evolving Men" (Hombres evolucionantes)	Laura Caballero	Alberto Caballero, Daniel Deorador, Carla Nigra, Laura Caballero	10 January 2025
22	2	"She's Definitely a Lesbian" (Bollera fijo)	Laura Caballero	Alberto Caballero, Daniel Deorador, Carla Nigra, Laura Caballero	10 January 2025
23	3	"Whoever Falls in Love First Loses" (El que se pilla pierde)	Laura Caballero	Alberto Caballero, Daniel Deorador, Carla Nigra, Laura Caballero	10 January 2025
24	4	"Two Plus Two..." (Dos más dos...)	Laura Caballero	Alberto Caballero, Daniel Deorador, Carla Nigra, Laura Caballero	10 January 2025
25	5	"Hey, Hate to Burst Your Bubble, But..." (Amiga, date cuenta)	Laura Caballero	Alberto Caballero, Daniel Deorador, Carla Nigra, Laura Caballero	10 January 2025
26	6	"Beta Males" (Machos beta)	Laura Caballero	Alberto Caballero, Daniel Deorador, Carla Nigra, Laura Caballero	10 January 2025
27	7	"Patriarchal Pact" (Pacto patriarcal)	Laura Caballero	Alberto Caballero, Daniel Deorador, Carla Nigra, Laura Caballero	10 January 2025
28	8	"Making Mistakes on Purpose" (Equivocarse adrede)	Laura Caballero	Alberto Caballero, Daniel Deorador, Carla Nigra, Laura Caballero	10 January 2025
29	9	"Zero Contact" (Contacto cero)	Laura Caballero	Alberto Caballero, Daniel Deorador, Carla Nigra, Laura Caballero	10 January 2025
30	10	"People Still Get Married" (La gente se sigue casando)	Laura Caballero	Alberto Caballero, Daniel Deorador, Carla Nigra, Laura Caballero	10 January 2025

=== Season 4 ===
No. overall	No. in season	Title	Directed by	Written by	Original release date
31	1	"In the End, You Have to Put It In" (Al final hay que meterla)	Laura Caballero	Alberto Caballero, Daniel Deorador, Carla Nigra, Laura Caballero	9 January 2026
32	2	"Spain Brand" (Marca España)	Laura Caballero	Alberto Caballero, Daniel Deorador, Carla Nigra, Laura Caballero	9 January 2026
33	3	"Echoes of a Wound" (Ecos de una herida)	Laura Caballero	Alberto Caballero, Daniel Deorador, Carla Nigra, Laura Caballero	9 January 2026
34	4	"You Can Always Be a Little More Heterosexual" (Siempre se puede ser un poco más hetero)	Laura Caballero	Alberto Caballero, Daniel Deorador, Carla Nigra, Laura Caballero	9 January 2026
35	5	"I Will Pray for You" (Rezaré por ti)	Laura Caballero	Alberto Caballero, Daniel Deorador, Carla Nigra, Laura Caballero	9 January 2026
36	6	"Magical Caribbean" (Caribe mágico)	Laura Caballero	Alberto Caballero, Daniel Deorador, Carla Nigra, Laura Caballero	9 January 2026

=== Season 5 ===
No. overall	No. in season	Title	Directed by	Written by	Original release date
37	1	"What More Do You Want?" (¿Pero qué más queréis?)	Laura Caballero	Alberto Caballero, Daniel Deorador, Carla Nigra, Laura Caballero	17 April 2026
38	2	"How Did Humanity Get to This Point?" (¿Cómo ha llegado la humanidad hasta aquí?)	Laura Caballero	Alberto Caballero, Daniel Deorador, Carla Nigra, Laura Caballero	17 April 2026
39	3	"Patriarchal Pact, LLC" (Pacto Patriarcal S.L.)	Laura Caballero	Alberto Caballero, Daniel Deorador, Carla Nigra, Laura Caballero	17 April 2026
40	4	"Clingy Energy" (Energía pegajosa)	Laura Caballero	Alberto Caballero, Daniel Deorador, Carla Nigra, Laura Caballero	17 April 2026
41	5	"The Faithful John" (El putero fiel)	Laura Caballero	Alberto Caballero, Daniel Deorador, Carla Nigra, Laura Caballero	17 April 2026
42	6	"Love Is Love" (El amor es el amor)	Laura Caballero	Alberto Caballero, Daniel Deorador, Carla Nigra, Laura Caballero	17 April 2026

== International versions ==
Netflix has announced that it will produce local adaptations of the series in France, Italy, the Netherlands, and Germany.

Currently airing franchise

Country	Local title	Network	Original release	Status
France	Super Mâles "Shafted"	Netflix	24 January 2025	Ended
Germany	Alphamännchen "Dudes"	Netflix	2 October 2025	Renewed
Italy	Maschi Veri "Real Men"	Netflix	21 May 2025	Renewed
Netherlands	Haantjes "Roosters"	Netflix	28 February 2025	Renewed
