= List of La que se avecina episodes =

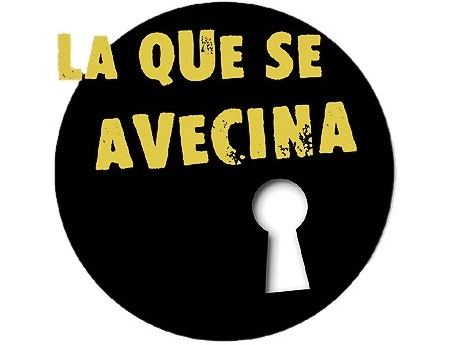

La que se avecina is a Spanish television situation comedy created by Alberto Caballero, Laura Caballero and Daniel Deorador.

== Series overview ==
Season	Episodes	Originally released	
Season	Episodes	First released	Last released
1	13	April 22, 2007	July 22, 2007
2	15	April 3, 2008	August 3, 2008
3	14	June 10, 2009	September 16, 2009
4	12	December 31, 2009	August 4, 2010
5	13	May 1, 2011	July 24, 2011
6	13	October 1, 2012	January 28, 2013
7	13	December 2, 2013	March 10, 2014
8	16	October 13, 2014	May 18, 2015
9	19	April 5, 2016	November 28, 2016
10	13	October 4, 2017	December 21, 2017
11	13	April 24, 2019	December 18, 2019
12	16	May 29, 2020	January 8, 2021

=== Season 1 (2007) ===
No. overall	No. in season	Title	Directed by	Written by	Original release date	Viewers (millions)
1	1	"Mirador de Montepinar"	Laura Caballero	Alberto Caballero	April 22, 2007	4.16
The Mirador de Montepinar urbanization is finally complete. Even though the floors are flawed, the doorbells don't work, the walls are paper thin, there are some annoying neighbors, and a new janitor with a questionable resume.
2	2	"Squatters, crushes and a blow in the garage"	Laura Caballero	Alberto Caballero	April 29, 2007	3.30
Disgusted to learn that Sergio does not want anything with her, Raquel tells the neighbors that she won't fix their homes' problems. However, the insistence of the owners and Joaquín makes Sergio conquer Raquel again.
3	3	"Tiles, a polygraph and a package by mail"	Laura Caballero	Alberto Caballero	May 6, 2007	3.06
Maite witnesses how Eric delivers some tiles to Enrique and Araceli, so the angry neighbors complain to Raquel. The commercial director tries to calm them down by promising a meeting with the head of the construction company.
4	4	"A defaulter, a kidnapping and a closet on the landing"	Laura Caballero	Alberto Caballero	May 13, 2007	3.36
Javi, badly advised by his neighbors, finally hires a "thug" so that the Defaulter pays his debt, but he turns out to be a clumsy guy who repeatedly goes for the wrong victim. The domestic war between Lola and Gregoria continues.
5	5	"A romance, a party man and a cow in the garden"	Laura Caballero	Alberto Caballero	May 20, 2007	3.59
After her sister's death, Doña Charo travels to her hometown to take care of the inheritance. Shortly after, the old woman returns to Montepinar with a cow, chickens and a pig. This urban farm will put the neighbors on war footing.
6	6	"A voyeur, an inspection and a credit card"	Laura Caballero	Alberto Caballero	May 27, 2007	3.72
After losing his wallet, Recio calls a meeting to question the neighbors. Javi tells him that he can't be suspicious without proof, but then he discovers that Lola found the wallet and paid for purchases with the neighbor's card.
7	7	"A reunion, an eviction and a paddle tournament"	Laura Caballero	Alberto Caballero	June 3, 2007	3.42
Izaskun and Mari Tere still squatter the show flat, but an oversight will make Raquel, Joaquín and Eric end up realizing it. Cristina is willing to seduce her crush, but her strategy fails the target.
8	8	"Lies, antidepressants and a Trojan fridge"	Laura Caballero	Alberto Caballero	June 10, 2007	3.63
Enrique is depressed. Araceli tries to cheer him up to with no avail, so Doña Charo gives her some "miraculous" pills. Izaskun and Mari Tere want to prevent their eviction while Cristina's seduction continues to create problems for her.
9	9	"A blackmail, an exclusive and a real estate scandal"	Laura Caballero	Alberto Caballero	June 17, 2007	2.71
Joaquín accidentally makes Izaskun and Mari Tere media stars while trying to blame them for squatting the show flat. The Recios have a leak in their roof and they'll have to visit the Defaulter. Other neighbors want to sell their houses because of their illegal status.
10	10	"Singles, impotences and a mishap in the pool"	Laura Caballero	Alberto Caballero	July 1, 2007	2.98
The construction company decides to make peace with Izaskun and Mari Tere at the same time that the high temperatures force the neighbors to sleep outside.
11	11	"A usufruct, a strip-tease and a visit to the Defaulter"	Laura Caballero	Alberto Caballero	July 8, 2007	2.89
12	12	"Jealousy, papillomas and a conflicting separation"	Laura Caballero	Alberto Caballero	July 15, 2007	2.35
The old women and the Recios have conflicts over the use of the pool. Cristina seems to finally seduce Javi, and Enrique decides to go out with Maxi to meet women.
13	13	"Bribes, arrests and a marriage of convenience"	Laura Caballero	Alberto Caballero	July 22, 2007	2.17
Raquel reconciles with Sergio, which forces Joaquín to go live with Eric downtown. Silvio will have to pretend to be Cristina's fiancé for the imminent wedding. The police will come to evict the residents of the building to demolish it.

=== Season 2 (2008) ===
No. overall	No. in season	Title	Directed by	Written by	Original release date	Viewers (millions)
14	1	"A bachelor, a yogurt with fiber and a new president"	Laura Caballero	Alberto Caballero	April 3, 2008	3.31
A severe (and fake) depression leads Javi to resign from the presidency of the community. After volunteering to fill the vacant position, Amador becomes the new president and Maite, happy with the new position, debuts as "first lady".
15	2	"An "F", a psychosis and an inconceivable romance"	Laura Caballero	Alberto Caballero	April 9, 2008	2.88
Amador faces his first crisis: Enrique has started the reform without informing the other owners of the urbanization about the business he is going to make. Maxi, a friend and partner of the councilor, has convinced him to set up a bar.
16	3	"A dare, a show and a Tibetan bowl"	Laura Caballero	Alberto Caballero	April 10, 2008	2.46
There is a huge scalextric in the community thanks to Sergio. Enrique's business is going to be a bar, with his consequent problems. An oversight by Amador gives the old women reasons to try to swindle the neighbors (again).
17	4	"A lie, a gay bar and a beast of interpretation"	Laura Caballero	Alberto Caballero	April 17, 2008	3.18
The opening of Enrique's bar: the Max & Henry, causes inconvenience among the neighbors, who file a complaint, but he uses his friendship with the councilman to keep it from closing. Meanwhile, Maxi has turned the place into a successful gay bar.
18	5	"An anniversary, a wig and a tupper-sex meeting"	Juan Luis Iborra	Alberto Caballero	April 24, 2008	3.65
A meeting between the women of the neighborhood worries Antonio and Amador, who see their respective marriages in danger. For his part, Javi is anguished for having forgotten both his mother's birthday and his marriage anniversary.
19	6	"A telephone, a brothel and a terrible humidity"	Laura Caballero	Alberto Caballero	May 1, 2008	3.26
Maxi has the brilliant idea of turning the Max & Henry into a nightclub, but when the councilman evicts the prostitutes from downtown, they protest in front of Mirador de Montepinar.
20	7	"A threesome, a maid and a shower of cauliflowers"	Juan Luis Iborra	Alberto Caballero	May 8, 2008	3.37
When the Recios install a satellite antenna, Max decides to hack their television signal to offer free football at the Max & Henry. On the other hand, Blanca suggests Sergio and Joaquín to carry out her fantasy: a threesome.
21	8	"One bet, five hundred cockroaches and an up-and-down cleaner"	Laura Caballero	Alberto Caballero	May 15, 2008	3.30
Since the large influx of people bothers them, the Recios fill the Max & Henry with cockroaches and alert the health authorities. But a proposal from Enrique will make them regret it. Lola and Sergio test Javi's fidelity with Blanca as bait.
22	9	"Swingers, an express wedding and a little orphan girl"	Laura Caballero	Alberto Caballero	May 22, 2008	2.95
Maxi rents the bar, transforming it into a swinger club to revive the business. Antonio and Berta, unaware of this situation, go there with the illusion of making new friends.
23	10	"Alcohol, bad said prawns and Spain's cuckold"	Juan Luis Iborra	Alberto Caballero	May 29, 2008	3.32
Enrique and Nines end up in bed after a very special night. For his part, Antonio attends yoga classes to minimize his outbursts of anger and meets his son's partner who has come from Ireland.
24	11	"A dataphone, a suicide and a president in his worst"	Laura Caballero	Alberto Caballero	June 6, 2008	2.35
Enrique will take advantage of Amador's fraud to overthrow him from the presidency. When "the Cuqui" discovers his wife's infidelity, he decides to move to Leo's apartment. In the attic, Sergio hires a prostitute for his brother Joaquín.
25	12	"A condemned, a ghost pregnancy and a summer without a pool"	Laura Caballero	Alberto Caballero	July 13, 2008	2.46
Nines will suffer a late period, a situation that will explode in his favor at work. The arrival of Antonio Recio to the presidency will make Enrique take measures from the cabinet in which he will prohibit the use of the pool.
26	13	"A plumber, a horny feel and a motorist granny"	Laura Caballero	Alberto Caballero	July 20, 2008	2.14
Antonio's mental health is in danger due to the stress that being president causes him, since a sewage blockage is combined with the strike of his employees. Amador lives with Maite again after Leo kicks him out to be with Patu.
27	14	"A birth, a cruise and a Golf & Spa resort"	Laura Caballero	Alberto Caballero	July 27, 2008	2.07
The economic problems of the community follow one another: the janitor and the gardener are still on strike for not having been paid and the neighbors will have to face the bill for the work carried out by a gang of masons.
28	15	"A theft, a bag and a cannabis cooperative"	Laura Caballero	Alberto Caballero	August 3, 2008	2.17
Antonio reaches a governance pact with Enrique and offers to be his successor as president. Together they discover that Lola makes a living growing marijuana in her storage room. Far from solving it, Antonio wants to take advantage of it.

=== Season 3 (2009) ===
No. overall	No. in season	Title	Directed by	Written by	Original release date
29	1	"A dolphin, two pussies and a dead defaulter"	Laura Caballero	Alberto Caballero	June 10, 2009
Javi and Lola want to rent a room to get money, but the arrival of Estela, Lola's mother, changes their plans. Antonio, Enrique and Coque continue on the trail of the Defaulter.
30	2	"A brothel, a couple of mothers-in-law, and a crazed desecration"	Laura Caballero	Alberto Caballero	June 17, 2009
Antonio Recio believes that he can collect the Defaulter's debt by investigating his environment, but the plan doesn't go very well. Amador lies to Maite saying that he is now the new director of the bank, but in reality he no longer works there.
31	3	"A youngster, a firefighter, and a suicide on the landing"	Laura Caballero	Alberto Caballero	June 24, 2009
A patient of Judith remains on the third-floor landing due to his psychological dependency on the therapist. This situation creates a great stir among the residents, who try to kick him out. All will end with Amador trying to be a hero.
32	4	"A wasp, a dominatrix and a murderer mucus"	Laura Caballero	Alberto Caballero	July 1, 2009
The continuous misunderstandings between Amador and Maite make both of them distance themselves more and more. The couple agrees to sell the apartment so that each one can rebuild their lives. Antonio and Berta intend to conceive a child.
33	5	"An obituary notice, an insemination, and a mother-in-law's romance"	Laura Caballero	Alberto Caballero	July 8, 2009
Antonio and Enrique decide to put a death notice of the Defaulter with the aim of contacting one of his relatives. The initiative takes effect when someone sends some flowers to honor the memory of the deceased.
34	6	"A diva, a pheasant and a flat worth a kidney"	Laura Caballero	Alberto Caballero	July 15, 2009
Antonio's son goes home with his new boyfriend. Antonio gets mad, but when he discovers that the father of his son's boyfriend is a sheikh, Antonio wants a wedding and tries to convince the sheikh to invest in his business.
35	7	"A gigolo, a safe and a wizard of love"	Laura Caballero	Alberto Caballero	July 22, 2009
Thanks to Enrique, Estela is going to perform at the neighborhood's festivities. Antonio investigates the new tenant because he thinks that he has some link with the Defaulter. Amador starts working as a gigolo to earn quick money.
36	8	"A holdup, a kawalapiti and a vacuum cleaner salesman"	Laura Caballero	Alberto Caballero	July 29, 2009
Antonio plans to rob his father-in-law's jewelry. For his part, Leo gets Amador a job as a vacuum cleaner salesman, however Amador's skills as a salesman are quite lacking. Estela introduces her father to Lola after so many years.
37	9	"A maharamindri, a mother in-law at the wheels and a gardener in the garden"	Laura Caballero	Alberto Caballero	August 5, 2009
Enrique meets a woman through Internet but discovers that she belongs to a sect. His idyll suddenly changes and he doesn't know how to act. Meanwhile, Berta is convinced that Antonio is cheating on her with Judith.
38	10	"A banishing, a sinful and a genetic scam"	Laura Caballero	Alberto Caballero	August 12, 2009
Berta feels guilty for being unfaithful to Antonio with Coque, but is unable to help it. To prevent Antonio from finding out, the two meet at Enrique's apartment. Meanwhile, Judith and Raquel organize an audition in search of men.
39	11	"A stork, a frying pan and eight toxic bears"	Laura Caballero	Alberto Caballero	August 19, 2009
Antonio tries to force Nines to give birth to make Berta happy on her birthday. On the other hand, Amador wants to win Maite back and goes to Enrique to write him a love letter that he can send anonymously.
40	12	"A dumb license, a malfeasant and a porn cowboy-malemaid"	Laura Caballero	Alberto Caballero	August 26, 2009
41	13	"A trip, a clown and a nursing home in the attic"	Laura Caballero	Alberto Caballero	September 2, 2009
Estela suffers an existential crisis and decides to set up a nursing home in her daughter's house. Maite and Amador are still separated and trying to adapt to being single; Maite is with Victor and Amador have Leo arranging dates for him.
42	14	"A getaway, two blackmail and a duvet with surprise"	Laura Caballero	Alberto Caballero	September 16, 2008
Enrique's life is in danger when he delivers to the police 3 million EUR that belonged to the Defaulter. Estela blackmails Berta when she discovers her extramarital affair with Coque and demands that the lovers satisfy her wishes.

=== Season 4 (2010) ===
No. overall	No. in season	Title	Directed by	Written by	Original release date
43	1	"A goat, five lions and a president with a turkey on his head"	Laura Caballero	Alberto Caballero	December 31, 2009
Enrique is missing and Antonio tries to justify Berta's absence. In addition, the president of the community proposes that all the residents of the property spend New Year's Eve together.
44	2	"A chihuahua, a sweeper and a rescue in the convent"	Laura Caballero	Alberto Caballero	May 26, 2010
The ever-rising tension between Lola and Javi reaches a peak as she buys her mother a chihuahua without consulting him, leaving him to be responsible for yet another expense. Antonio, Enrique and Coque try to rescue Berta from the convent she got herself into after escaping the Gaelic countryside where she resided with Coque. Amador furthers job search as an "urban residues technician".
45	3	"A masseur, a pussy magnet and a prince of the Carpathians"	Laura Caballero	Alberto Caballero	June 2, 2010
To get closer to his son, who has informed him that he wants to marry his girlfriend, Enrique redecorates the apartment following the Gothic aesthetic. Antonio is convinced that his wife has been unfaithful to him with the masseur.
46	4	"A deception, a drug addict and a neighbor to the brink of death"	Laura Caballero	Alberto Caballero	June 2, 2010
Chusa, a poly-drug addict and former prostitute, will do everything possible to win back the love of Coque, her old boyfriend. Antonio now suspects that his wife is unfaithful to him with Javi, after finding some keys under the bed.
47	5	"A bohemian, a few full lips and meringue, meringue"	Laura Caballero	Alberto Caballero	June 9, 2010
The TV calls Estela: She has to go to "Pelis de Barrio" to talk about her old movie. Preparation for the program will bring troubles. Enrique rents the Defaulter's apartment to a married couple, but they turn out to be anything but quiet.
48	6	"Captain Salami, a priest in peril and a goddess of fertility"	Laura Caballero	Alberto Caballero	June 16, 2010
Antonio goes to the church in search of the name of his wife's lover, since he believes that she has revealed it to the priest. Meanwhile, Amador works as a stripper under the pseudonym of "Captain Salami".
49	7	"An analogue shutdown, a psychological childbirth and a sex addict"	Laura Caballero	Alberto Caballero	June 23, 2010
Antonio decides to steal the antenna of a nearby urbanization when the community runs out of TV signal. Amador, in his search of love, seduces a parking lot controller, but due to family obligations the relationship doesn't come well.
50	8	"A fungi, a pythoness and a wandering spirit"	Laura Caballero	Alberto Caballero	June 30, 2010
Izaskun inherits a fortune from a friend. Obsessed about his wife's lover, Antonio accuses Enrique, who is actually with Judith. Estela becomes a medium on TV, which will end up giving her the idea of setting up an office at Javi and Lola's house.
51	9	"A hitman, a prostitute and a dangerous driving"	Laura Caballero	Alberto Caballero	July 14, 2010
A woman runs over Amador with her vehicle. Although his injuries are minor, Maxi makes him a controversial proposal: pretend that he suffers a serious injury to scam the driver's insurance and collect money for the motorcycle.
52	10	"A hottie bunny, an immigrant and an angry judge"	Laura Caballero	Alberto Caballero	July 21, 2010
Judith wants to go out with Enrique, but the age difference worries her. Berta convinces Antonio to hire someone for the business, he ends up hiring an illegal Peruvian immigrant. Amador flirts with a woman who turns out to be too young.
53	11	"A project leader, an unbearable sister and a striker Pichichi"	Laura Caballero	Alberto Caballero	July 28, 2010
The men of the community form a soccer team to compete in a tournament. Judith hires a gigolo to pretend to be her boyfriend when her sister visits, since she is ashamed of Enrique. Estela starts a relationship with Javi's boss.
54	12	"A hausfrau-hunter, a heartfelt condolence and the fall of the Recio empire"	Laura Caballero	Alberto Caballero	August 4, 2010
Antonio Recio finds out that Coque was Berta's lover after threatening Parrales with death. Goya is proposed to be the new president, but she dies in a domestic accident. Vicente decides to bury her in secret so he doesn't have to tell Javi.

=== Season 5 (2011) ===
No. overall	No. in season	Title	Directed by	Written by	Original release date
55	1	"An ex-wife, a former president and the mother who gave birth to the fucker playboy"	Laura Caballero	Alberto Caballero	May 1, 2011
56	2	"A thimblerigger, two omelettes and caprice of the Bourbons"	Laura Caballero	Alberto Caballero	May 8, 2011
57	3	"A renegade, a possessed woman and Albacete's first gay man"	Laura Caballero	Alberto Caballero	May 15, 2011
58	4	"A ring, a reconciliation and a mechanical monstrosity"	Laura Caballero	Alberto Caballero	May 22, 2011
59	5	"A controller, a new Maite and an anal fissure"	Laura Caballero	Alberto Caballero	May 29, 2011
60	6	"An autumnal romance, a forbidden dish and a snake constrictor"	Laura Caballero	Alberto Caballero	June 5, 2011
61	7	"A bride on a diet, a Tongoliki village and a Gestapo fräulein"	Laura Caballero	Alberto Caballero	June 12, 2011
62	8	"A mule, a man called Failure and an old woman devoured by hens"	Laura Caballero	Alberto Caballero	June 19, 2011
63	9	"A lame janitor, a lizard drink and a wholesaler in love"	Laura Caballero	Alberto Caballero	June 26, 2011
64	10	"A holiday, a descendant of the Cid and the second gay of Albacete"	Laura Caballero	Alberto Caballero	July 3, 2011
65	11	"A golden lobster, a secret agent and two lesbian apprentices"	Laura Caballero	Alberto Caballero	July 10, 2011
66	12	"An orgonite, a chemical emasculation and a plan B"	Laura Caballero	Alberto Caballero	July 17, 2011
67	13	"A wedding, an exiled lion and the spider-crabs revolution"	Laura Caballero	Alberto Caballero	July 24, 2011

=== Season 6 (2012–13) ===
No. overall	No. in season	Title	Directed by	Written by	Original release date
68	1	"A housewife, a unibrow and a pioneer of the air"	Laura Caballero	Alberto Caballero	October 1, 2012
69	2	"A fake president, the Spanish Rambo and a man who did not do anything"	Laura Caballero	Alberto Caballero	October 8, 2012
70	3	"A casket, a street market and a mortgage execution"	Laura Caballero	Alberto Caballero	October 15, 2012
71	4	"An Iniesta sticker, two justice clowns and a deathwatch in the Ground B"	Laura Caballero	Alberto Caballero	October 22, 2012
72	5	"A champion boxer, a few prodigious genes and a demi-Papuchi"	Laura Caballero	Alberto Caballero	October 29, 2012
73	6	"A sponging, an ultimatum and the wacky races"	Laura Caballero	Alberto Caballero	November 5, 2012
74	7	"A shark, an eviction and the shrimps of apocalypse"	Laura Caballero	Alberto Caballero	November 12, 2012
75	8	"A bun, a detective lion and a shrimp to port"	Laura Caballero	Alberto Caballero	November 19, 2012
76	9	"A Chinese, a Russian and a homosexual in the storage room"	Laura Caballero	Alberto Caballero	November 26, 2012
77	10	"An auction, a cream for old women and a hot sweet baby"	Laura Caballero	Alberto Caballero	December 3, 2012
78	11	"An onanist, a stolen child and a human torch"	Laura Caballero	Alberto Caballero	January 14, 2013
79	12	"An eco-farm, a howitzer and a satanic insemination"	Laura Caballero	Alberto Caballero	January 21, 2013
80	13	"A kick eviction, a skid and the vampirecanthrope's grandmother"	Laura Caballero	Alberto Caballero	January 28, 2013

=== Season 7 (2013–14) ===
No. overall	No. in season	Title	Directed by	Written by	Original release date
81	1	"A rotten pipe, a conceptual salvager and the first pure Montepinarian"	Laura Caballero	Alberto Caballero	December 2, 2013
82	2	"A chloroform, a flying baby and a cooperative of Lions"	Laura Caballero	Alberto Caballero	December 9, 2013
83	3	"An annoying vedette, a fishmonger in a quagmire and lion pawn"	Laura Caballero	Alberto Caballero	December 16, 2013
84	4	"A fishmonger hospitality, a rural death and a few drops of burundanga"	Laura Caballero	Alberto Caballero	December 30, 2013
85	5	"A biopic, a modern and independent woman and a nuclear cemetery"	Laura Caballero	Alberto Caballero	January 6, 2014
86	6	"A bank deposit, a concealment of assets and a blackmailer Romanian"	Laura Caballero	Alberto Caballero	January 13, 2014
87	7	"A terrorist kit, a Yoko Ono and an alien visit"	Laura Caballero	Alberto Caballero	January 20, 2014
88	8	"Two trials, a reality-show and a Tantric massage"	Laura Caballero	Alberto Caballero	January 27, 2014
89	9	"A beta video, a stepmother and a leap into the void"	Laura Caballero	Alberto Caballero	February 3, 2014
90	10	"A mole, a lion torero and fled espetero"	Laura Caballero	Alberto Caballero	February 10, 2014
91	11	"A mailbox sneaks, a butler in a Ferrari and syringe Doctor Trujillo"	Laura Caballero	Alberto Caballero	February 19, 2014
92	12	"A loving bear, false twins and a descent into hell"	Laura Caballero	Alberto Caballero	February 26, 2014
93	13	"Cleaning of karma, a family on the run and wish it would rain coffee in the field"	Laura Caballero	Alberto Caballero	March 10, 2014

=== Season 8 (2014–15) ===
No. overall	No. in season	Title	Directed by	Written by	Original release date
94	1	"A wild man, an old damned ghost sucking candy"	Laura Caballero	Alberto Caballero	October 13, 2014
95	2	"A scavenger single, the Urdangarín jungle and two sluts on the rollercoaster"	Laura Caballero	Alberto Caballero	October 20, 2014
96	3	"A pineapple, a middle-aged gogó and a shark with two penises"	Laura Caballero	Alberto Caballero	October 27, 2014
97	4	"Gastroscopy, a crazy, crazy party and the king of toilets"	Laura Caballero	Alberto Caballero	November 3, 2014
98	5	"A solar panels, a junkie chacha and a lot of shit"	Laura Caballero	Alberto Caballero	November 10, 2014
99	6	"A school sweetheart, a donkey without carrot and a desecration of chapel"	Laura Caballero	Alberto Caballero	November 17, 2014
100	7	"A striped president, a cascade of misfortunes and a startling discovery"	Laura Caballero	Alberto Caballero	November 24, 2014
101	8	"A judgment, an attack on Shakespeare and an enclosed tigress"	Laura Caballero	Alberto Caballero	December 1, 2014
102	9	"Smurfs terrorists, a sad old bird and style mandanga"	Laura Caballero	Alberto Caballero	December 8, 2014
103	10	"Some moths, one multiorgasmic and a killer chickenpox"	Laura Caballero	Alberto Caballero	December 15, 2014
104	11	"An ugly number, a magpie on the run and a lamb by messenger"	Laura Caballero	Alberto Caballero	December 22, 2014
105	12	"A journal escort, a lover and a hellish mother espetero"	Laura Caballero	Alberto Caballero	April 20, 2015
106	13	"A pretty junkie, a sausage to American and salami lying"	Laura Caballero	Alberto Caballero	April 27, 2015
107	14	"A churumbel, romantic lobotomy and gore brutal experience"	Laura Caballero	Alberto Caballero	May 4, 2015
108	15	"A humiliation of Juju, a furious rage and forehead gotelé"	Laura Caballero	Alberto Caballero	May 11, 2015
109	16	"A dirty book, a wounded wolf and a medieval pifostio"	Laura Caballero	Alberto Caballero	May 18, 2015

=== Season 9 (2015-16) ===
No. overall	No. in season	Title	Directed by	Written by	Original release date
110	1	"A sonambule, a flower–jar man and an acarus in coat"	Laura Caballero	Alberto Caballero	April 5, 2016
111	2	"An anabolic, a rotating radar and a croquette deconstruction"	Laura Caballero	Alberto Caballero	April 12, 2016
112	3	"A honeymoon, a rustic land for development and a president soaking"	Laura Caballero	Alberto Caballero	April 19, 2016
113	4	"A bar with wifi, a man with weight and a maruja apprentice"	Laura Caballero	Alberto Caballero	April 26, 2016
114	5	"A usurped lion, a hymenoplasty and a surprise reform"	Laura Caballero	Alberto Caballero	May 3, 2016
115	6	"An electric car, a chara literata and a bittersweet finger soup"	Laura Caballero	Alberto Caballero	May 10, 2016
116	7	"A beach club, a village dowser and a neighbor without a vagina"	Laura Caballero	Alberto Caballero	May 17, 2016
117	8	"A blind woman, a few genes and a recycled wholesaler"	Laura Caballero	Alberto Caballero	May 25, 2016
118	9	"A crazy pianist, bilingual zombies and a focus of vice and fornicio"	Laura Caballero	Alberto Caballero	June 1, 2016
119	10	"An aerophobic, a quick–change wholesaler and a low–cost funeral home"	Laura Caballero	Alberto Caballero	October 10, 2016
120	11	"A secession, a sub–pineapple and superchochete against Captain Salami"	Laura Caballero	Alberto Caballero	October 17, 2016
121	12	"A yaya by surprise, a vasectomy and the great orchestra of Montepinar"	Laura Caballero	Alberto Caballero	October 24, 2016
122	13	"A tank, a Russian eminence and the mother of all the spills"	Laura Caballero	Alberto Caballero	November 1, 2016
123	14	"A dead person in life, a little brother and a souvenir collector"	Laura Caballero	Alberto Caballero	November 7, 2016
124	15	"A premium policy, a boyfriend–band–aid and a wholesaler with the genre in sight"	Laura Caballero	Alberto Caballero	November 14, 2016
125	16	"A ruin for sale, an explosive election and a refugee camp"	Laura Caballero	Alberto Caballero	November 21, 2016
126	17	"A rehabilitation, a deadly attack and a return to Villazarcillo"	Laura Caballero	Alberto Caballero	November 28, 2016
127	18	"A rotten pineapple, a man without a filter and the walking stick in Ibiza"	Laura Caballero	Alberto Caballero	December 12, 2016
128	19	"A lifeless vagina, an emotional pillory and a death Christmas"	Laura Caballero	Alberto Caballero	December 19, 2016

=== Season 10 (2017) ===
No. overall	No. in season	Title	Directed by	Written by	Original release date
129	1	"A show–room, a government in office and a ladybug denier"	Laura Caballero	Alberto Caballero	October 4, 2017
130	2	"An asexual, some amiguis and a greedy ghost"	Laura Caballero	Alberto Caballero	October 11, 2017
131	3	"A sugarbaby, a stump filet and an express diogenes"	Laura Caballero	Alberto Caballero	October 18, 2017
132	4	"A janitor, an impossible romance and a treacherous treasure"	Laura Caballero	Alberto Caballero	October 23, 2017
133	5	"A virtual girlfriend, a Pretty Maid and a confused mamoneo"	Laura Caballero	Alberto Caballero	October 30, 2017
134	6	"A paternal referent, a Romanian curse and the hunt for the fornicator of the storeroom"	Laura Caballero	Alberto Caballero	November 6, 2017
135	7	"A mortgage welfare, two frustrated inventors and a cabaret-cabaret"	Laura Caballero	Alberto Caballero	November 13, 2017
136	8	"A father-in-law, a liberated maruja and a youtuber epidemic"	Laura Caballero	Alberto Caballero	November 20, 2017
137	9	"A castrating shot, a loyal and submissive waiter and two love strategists"	Laura Caballero	Alberto Caballero	November 27, 2017
138	10	"A bypass, a qualified concierge and a Zulu wholesaler"	Laura Caballero	Alberto Caballero	December 4, 2017
139	11	"An African predator, a Russian doll, and a pussy-free night"	Laura Caballero	Alberto Caballero	December 11, 2017
140	12	"A passenger chochette, a lesbian with a backpack and Father Lollipops"	Laura Caballero	Alberto Caballero	December 18, 2017
141	13	"An interracial soap opera, an illegal detention and the palace of Count Manfredzum Neuenthurn von der Pfordten"	Laura Caballero	Alberto Caballero	December 21, 2017

=== Season 11 ===
No. overall	No. in season	Title	Directed by	Written by	Original release date
142	1	"A power vacuum, a manifested uselessness, and an evil and tiresome being"	Laura Caballero	Alberto Caballero	April 24, 2019
143	2	"Sabotage, a buddy mommy, and a backstabbing"	Laura Caballero	Alberto Caballero	May 1, 2019
144	3	"A centenarian junkie, multiple tenants, and a philatelic act"	Laura Caballero	Alberto Caballero	May 8, 2019
145	4	"A trip to Cuenca, two tinderbrothers, and World War III"	Laura Caballero	Alberto Caballero	May 15, 2019
146	5	"Stage Fright, a homopetardous wedding, and the devils of Montepinar"	Laura Caballero	Alberto Caballero	May 22, 2019
147	6	"A cloudy appetizer, an emotional ITV, and a foolish patron"	Laura Caballero	Alberto Caballero	May 29, 2019
148	7	"An apprentice stud, a redeeming martyrdom, and a borderline in trouble"	Laura Caballero	Alberto Caballero	June 5, 2019
149	8	"A potato in the air, a battle of Evangelicals, and a temple of hidden sardines"	Laura Caballero	Alberto Caballero	June 12, 2019
150	9	"A human broccoli, a mystical skid, and an untimely awakening"	Laura Caballero	Alberto Caballero	November 20, 2019
151	10	"A cornered president, a wholesaler in diapers, and a borderline in love"	Laura Caballero	Alberto Caballero	November 27, 2019
152	11	"An overwhelmed businessman, a trio of bandages, and the authentic message of Christ"	Laura Caballero	Alberto Caballero	December 4, 2019
153	12	"A dispensation, a fetus in fetu, and a Turkish graft"	Laura Caballero	Alberto Caballero	December 10, 2019
154	13	"An emotional vibrator, a subsidized wedding, and the return of the vigilante clowns"	Laura Caballero	Alberto Caballero	December 17, 2019

=== Season 12 ===
No. overall	No. in season	Title	Directed by	Written by	Original release date
155	1	"A human wreck, a top prawn, and a scholarly slut"	Laura Caballero	Alberto Caballero	May 29, 2020
156	2	"A Gypsy curse, a salami for mommies, and the return of the Tankette"	Laura Caballero	Alberto Caballero	May 29, 2020
157	3	"A wandering suitcase, a universal skewer, and two old queers partying"	Laura Caballero	Alberto Caballero	May 29, 2020
158	4	"A sexual terrorist, a drug dealer, and a quantum leap"	Laura Caballero	Alberto Caballero	May 29, 2020
159	5	"A trip to Venice, a veteran vegan, and a 20-year-old McClurigan"	Laura Caballero	Alberto Caballero	May 29, 2020
160	6	"A chauvinist, a convicted altruist, and a neighborhood cartel"	Laura Caballero	Alberto Caballero	May 29, 2020
161	7	"A nuptial levy, an imaginary friend, and the Vega Sicilia of sperm"	Laura Caballero	Alberto Caballero	May 29, 2020
162	8	"A sibylline plan, an animalist wholesaler, and a cultural brooch"	Laura Caballero	Alberto Caballero	May 29, 2020
163	9	"A Romanian pineapple, an emotional reset, and the Winston Churchill of Montepinar"	Miguel Albaladejo	Alberto Caballero	January 8, 2021
164	10	"A political ruin, an intermittent adulteress, and the hard life of a nutcracker"	Miguel Albaladejo	Alberto Caballero	January 8, 2021
165	11	"Penis envy, a satanic hardware store, and a prostate-brain connection"	Miguel Albaladejo	Alberto Caballero	January 8, 2021
166	12	"A few graverobbing housewives, an exchange of talents, and a two-way borderline"	Miguel Albaladejo	Alberto Caballero	January 8, 2021
167	13	"A antibacterial panty liner, a female friendly feminine borderline, and the ponytail operation"	Miguel Albaladejo	Alberto Caballero	January 8, 2021
168	14	"A rural exile, a chemical exorcism, and the revolution of the vigilante clowns"	Miguel Albaladejo	Alberto Caballero	January 8, 2021
169	15	"A beach escape, a sanctuary for wholesalers, and the return of Detective León"	Miguel Albaladejo	Alberto Caballero	January 8, 2021
170	16	"A heroic resistance, an underground carthasis, and a goodbye forever"	Miguel Albaladejo	Alberto Caballero	January 8, 2021

=== Season 16 ===
This season was the first to reduce the duration of its episodes from 90 minutes to 55 minutes. Also, the 200th episode was premiered in cinemas as a special event days before the start of the season.

No. overall	No. in season	Title	Directed by	Written by	Original release date	Viewers (millions)
195	1	"A Minion vice president, the wolf of Contubernio, and here goes the turnstile again"	Mario Montero and Ricardo A. Solla	Alberto Caballero, Daniel Deorador and Carla Nigra	November 18, 2025 (Prime Video); 2027 (Telecinco)	N/A
Amador's auto rickshaw business is thriving, and he needs to expand, putting his unique business ideas into practice, much to the dismay of his partner Bruno. Meanwhile, Carlota tries to enlist the help of grandparents to raise her daughter.
196	2	"An empty niche syndrome, an immature gut, and a widower open to love"	Mario Montero and Ricardo A. Solla	Alberto Caballero, Daniel Deorador, Carla Nigra and Elizabeth Cruz	November 25, 2025 (Prime Video); 2027 (Telecinco)	TBD
Antonio continues to torment the residents of the interior flats, who have a very hard struggle to go outside. To guard his territory, he needs a janitor, but Coque betrayed him by going to Tuk-Tuk Rivas, and the janitor market is so terrible.
197	3	"An intrusive grandmother, a puresplash filter, and an ethnical code"	TBA	TBA	December 2, 2025 (Prime Video); 2027 (Telecinco)	TBD
198	4	"A flat-earther, a drug dealer janitor, and a minimalist opening"	TBA	TBA	December 9, 2025 (Prime Video); 2027 (Telecinco)	TBD
199	5	TBA	TBA	TBA	December 16, 2025 (Prime Video); 2027 (Telecinco)	TBD
200	6	"A lawless town, a Mormon loser, and a double-height saloon"	Mario Montero and Ricardo A. Solla	Unknown	November 11, 2025 (Cinema limited event); December 23, 2025 (Prime Video); 2027 (Telecinco)	N/A
Additional note: The episode is based on the Western genre, being an alternate story with the series's characters reimagined as people from the Old West, having their own names being changed to English versions.
201	7	TBA	TBA	TBA	December 30, 2025 (Prime Video); 2027 (Telecinco)	TBD
202	8	TBA	TBA	TBA	January 6, 2026 (Prime Video); 2027 (Telecinco)	TBD

== Special episodes ==
- Special Episode 01 - Las mejores tomas falsas de la serie (The best false captures of the series): False Captures
- Special Episode 02 - The very best of Montepinar, Volumen 1 (The very best of Montepinar, 1st Episode): False Captures
- Special Episode 03 - The very best of Montepinar, Volumen 2 (The very best of Montepinar, 2nd Episode): False Captures
- Special Episode 04 - The very best of Montepinar, Volumen 3 (The very best of Montepinar, 3rd Episode): False Captures
- Special Episode 05 - El breaking of (The breaking of): False Captures
- Special Episode 06 - ¡Qué campanadas se avecinan! (What end of year approaches): It was a special episode that was issued between 23:45 on December 31, 2012, up to them 00:15 hours on January 1, 2013. Only it possessed Pablo Chiapella (Amador Rivas), Jordi Sanchez (Antonio Recio) and Vanesa Romero (Raquel Villanueva) like index, also operated Cristina Medina (Nines Chacón) as secondary personage.
- Special Episode 07 - Tomas falsas a cascoporro (False captures to heaps): False Captures
- Special Episode 08 - Salami, huevones, mandangas y tomas falsas (Salami, huevones, sluggishnesses and false captures): False Captures
- Special Episode 09 - Shaking of de La que se avecina (Shaking of La Que Se Avecina): A special program about the index
- Special Episode 10 - Gracias por hacernos reír (Homenaje a Mariví Bilbao) (Thank you for making us laugh (honoring Mariví Bilbao)): On April 3, 2013, Mariví Bilbao died, aged 83, the actress recorded more than 70 episodes, and left the series a few months before her death. On the same night, Factoría de Ficción (the channel that broad casts La que se Avecina) broadcast this special with two episodes in which her character has major roles.

== Hoy se nos avecina ==
A special season, titled "Hoy se nos avecina", is broadcast every Monday on FDF. Viewers send questions through the Internet, which are read and answered by characters from the show. On April 8, 2013, Mariví Bilbao's episode was premiered five days after her death.

This special season started on February 11, 2013, and ended on June 17, 2013. The following list below contains the following characters starring in these episodes:

- Episode 01: Amador Rivas
- Episode 02: Enrique Pastor
- Episode 03: Nines
- Episode 04: Coque
- Episode 05: Antonio Recio
- Episode 06: Javier Maroto
- Episode 07: Araceli
- Episode 08: Estela Reynolds
- Episode 09: Especial Mariví Bilbao
- Episode 10: Leo
- Episode 11: Berta
- Episode 12: Raquel
- Episode 13: Fran
- Episode 14: Vicente
- Episode 16: Maxi
- Episode 17: Maite
- Episode 17: Fermín
- Episode 18: Lola
- Episode 19: Judith

== Soundtrack ==
- Mandanga Style by Amador Rivas
