= Ricardo Arroyo =

Ricardo Arroyo may refer to:

- Ricardo Arroyo (actor)
- Ricardo Arroyo (politician)
