= Sofía Nieto =

Spanish actress

- Born: August 16, 1984 (age 42); Alcorcón
- Known for: actress and mathematician

Elena Sofía Nieto Monje (Alcorcón; August 16, 1984), known as Sofía Nieto, is a Spanish actress and mathematician known especially for having worked in series such as Aquí no hay quien viva and La que se avecina.

== Biography ==
She began her career as an actress at the age of 16, starting little by little in the world of theatre.

In 2003 she was chosen to play Natalia Cuesta, daughter of Juan Cuesta (Jose Luis Gil) in the Spanish TV series Aquí no hay quien viva, a role that made her well known among the public, as well as the rest of her co-stars. She acted in the series until the end of its broadcast on the 6 July 2006.

After Telecinco bought the rights of the Antena 3 series, she and most of the actors of Aquí no hay quien viva moved in January to the new series called La que se avecina, a series that is currently broadcast on Telecinco, and she went on to play Sandra, an intern at the hairdresser's of Araceli Madariaga. But when Araceli Madariaga (Isabel Ordaz) got divorced from Enrique Pastor (Jose Luis Gil), she turned the hairdresser's into a bar and she became a waitress. She left the series in the second season.

She has filmed a telefilm called Bichos raros. She has participated in plays such as Entremeses by Miguel de Cervantes and in Amor de don Perlimplín con Belisa en su jardín by Federico García Lorca.

== Education ==
In 2002, at the age of 18, she was awarded first prize in the XV Chemistry Olympiad, by the Universidad Rey Juan Carlos.

She studied bachelor's degree in mathematics at the Universidad Autónoma de Madrid where he graduated with the Premio Extraordinario de Licenciatura in 2007.

In 2006, she took part in the XXV Congreso Internacional de Matemáticos, in Madrid, and in the III Curso Internacional de Análisis Matemático de Andalucía.

She later received her PhD in mathematics from the Universidad Autónoma de Madrid, as well as being an assistant professor at that university between 2010 and 2016.

== Television career ==
In Aquí no hay quien viva and La que se avecina she played the characters Natalia Cuesta and Sandra Espinosa, respectively.

- Natalia Cuesta from Aquí no hay quien viva (2003-2006) (91 episodes) She starts in the series as an intelligent, manipulative, disobedient, promiscuous and partying girl, always rebelling against her parents (especially against her mother, Paloma, with whom she had a very bad relationship). Throughout the series we see her with a boyfriend disc jockey, sharing a flat with some rastafaris stoners, flirting with neighbours like Roberto, Carlos or Fernando, and even pregnant by artificial insemination, although the biological parents end up backing out and she keeps the baby. She ends up dating Yago, Lucía's ex-boyfriend. After having her baby she suffers from post-partum depression. In the last episode of the series she travels with Yago to Cuba, leaving her daughter with Juan and Isabel.
- Sandra Espinosa from La que se avecina (2007-2008) (26 episodes). She is a totally neurotic, nervous, shy girl who is constantly upset by any problem she has at work. She worked as a hairdresser intern with an Argentinean, Fabio, who treats her like a student, under the orders of a boss who is a bit upset. Later she works as a waitress in the bar where the hairdresser's shop used to be.

Year	Title	Role	Duration
2003-2006	Aquí no hay quien viva	Natalia Cuesta Hurtado	Seasons 1-5 (91 episodes)
2007-2008	La que se avecina	Sandra Espinosa	Seasons 1-2 (26 episodes)
