= Carlota Boza =

Spanish actress

- Born: Carlota Boza Mendo; 16 May 2001 (age 23); Boadilla del Monte, Madrid, Spain
- Occupation: Actress
- Years active: 2005–present

Carlota Boza Mendo (Boadilla del Monte, Madrid, May 16, 2001) is a Spanish actress and sister of actor Fernando Boza Mendo. She is best known for playing Carlota Rivas in the TV show La que se avecina.

== Biography ==
Carlota, the first daughter of Fernando Jesús Boza González and Eva Mara Mendo Domínguez, and sister of child actor Fernando Boza, started in the world of advertising in 2005 when she was only 4 years old, appearing in advertising brochures for department stores like Carrefour or shooting TV commercials like the one for Tinukis dolls.

In 2006, she was selected along with her brother Fernando to play the role of the children of Los Cuquis in the series La que se avecina by Telecinco.

In 2009, she was in the short film Clarividencia with her own mother, Eva Mendo, and the actor Fernando Guillén Cuervo.

In 2010, she participated in the Internet series Desamaos. That same year, she played the role of a young Eugenia Martínez de Irujo in the second part of La Duquesa, a Telecinco telefilm about the life of the Duchess of Italy.

In 2011, she took part in the 19th episode of the second season of the TVE series Los misterios de Laura.

In 2012, she recorded a short film called El Accidente. In 2013, she recorded a short film called Bingo!.

She continued with her role in La que se avecina, alongside her own brother, Fernando Boza until the end of the series in 2021.

For the fifth consecutive year, she was also in La Noche en Paz, of Telecinco.

On January 5, 2017, she participated for the first time as co-presenter of the gala Reyes y estrellas on La 1.

== Filmography ==
=== Television series ===
Year	Serie	Channel	Role	Notes
2007–2017; 2019–Present	La que se avecina	Telecinco	Carlota Rivas Figueroa	Seasons 1-7;12 on a principal basis Seasons 9-14 on a recurring basis Season 8-12 as guest
2010	La duquesa	Telecinco	Eugenia Martínez de Irujo	1 episode
2011	Los misterios de Laura	La 1	María Fernández (kid)	1 episode

=== Television programs ===
Year	Program	Channel	Role
2017	Reyes y estrellas	La 1	Host
2019	Adivina qué hago esta noche	Cuatro	Guest

=== Short films ===
Year	Program	Character
2009	Clarividencia	Gabriela
2013	¡Bingo!	Protagonist

=== Others ===
Year	Program	Character	Notes
2010	Desalmados	Angustias	Web series
2012	El accidente	Car girl	Web series
2015	Desatranques Jaén	Worried girl	YouTube short film
