= Raúl Tejón =

Spanish actor (born 1968)

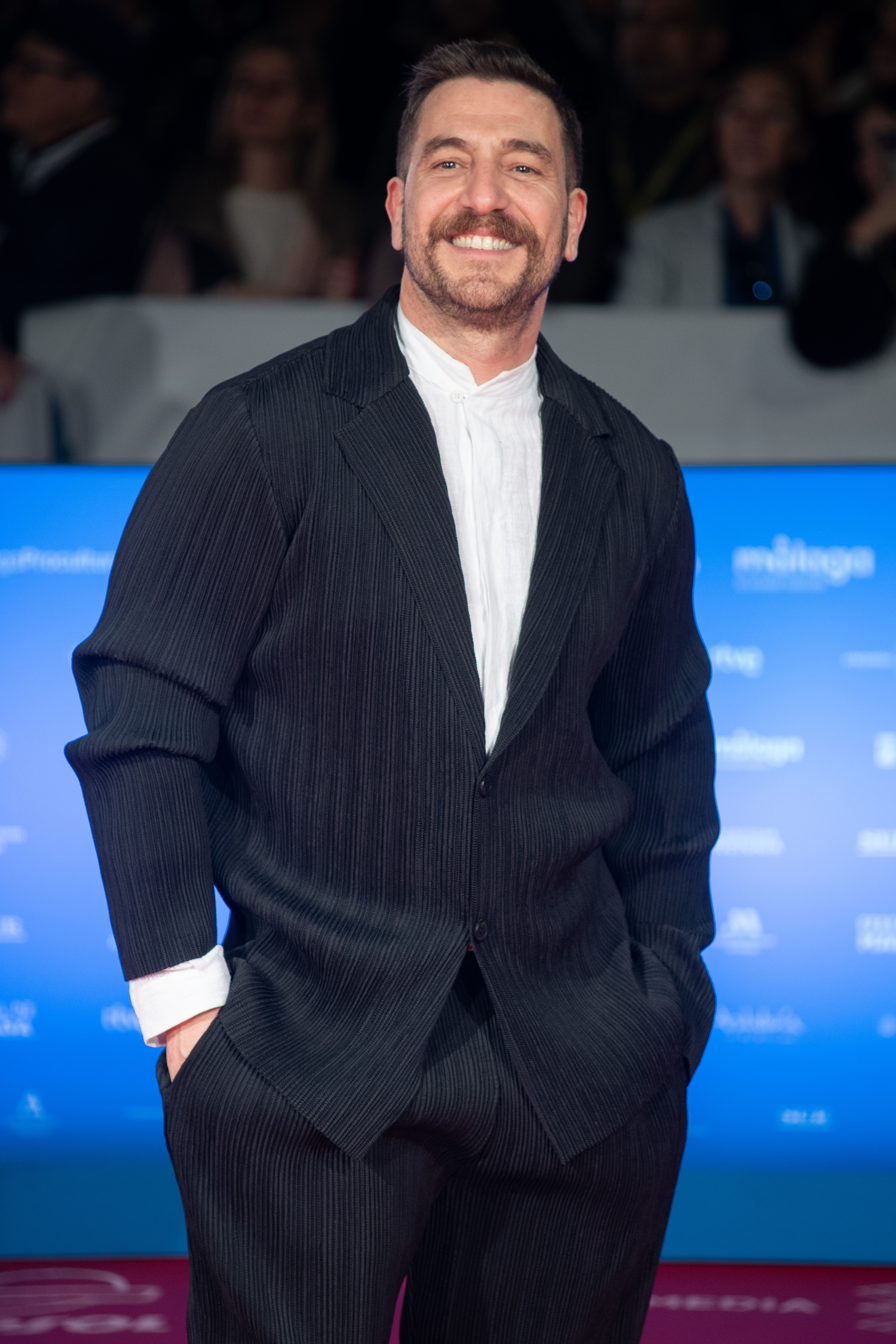
- Tejón at the Málaga Festival 2024
- Born: Raúl Tejón Sánchez; October 9, 1975 (age 50); Madrid, Spain
- Occupation: Actor
- Years active: 2001–present

Raúl Tejón Sánchez (born October 9, 1975) is a Spanish actor. His professional career has primarily focused on theater and television, with some forays into film, particularly in several short films. For television, his notable roles include the series Amar en tiempos revueltos, Vis a vis, La verdad, Machos Alfa, and Caronte. On stage, he has had the opportunity to interpret works by classic authors such as Calderón de la Barca or William Shakespeare.

== Early life and education ==
Raúl Tejón was born in Madrid in 1975. He has two bachelor's degrees, one in Law and another in Business Administration and Management. As a child, he did theater at school.

== Career ==
=== Theater ===
Tejón has performed in numerous theater productions, including:

- Romeo and Juliet by William Shakespeare. Direction: Sergio Peris-Mencheta.
- Human Stories, based on texts by Harold Pinter, M. Pavlova, and Woody Allen. Dir. Sergio Peris-Mencheta.
- Turning Pages, written and directed by Herminia Rodríguez de Lamo.
- Edmond by David Mamet.
- The Foods of Man by Calderón de la Barca.

=== Television ===
His television appearances include:

- Amar en tiempos revueltos (2005–2012)
- Vis a vis (2015–2019)
- La verdad (2016)
- Caronte (2020)
- Machos Alfa (2022–present)

=== Film ===
Tejón has also starred in several short films and has minor roles in feature films.

He has a major role in the movie ¿Quién quiere casarse con un Astronauta? (2024).

== Personal life ==
Tejón lives in Getafe. Furthermore, he has publicly come out as gay. Tejón has been very open about his sexual orientation. He has mentioned the challenges of being a gay actor in Spain, stating in interviews that he has faced discrimination in casting due to his homosexuality.
