= Mandanga Style =

Single by Amador Rivas
- Released: February 2, 2015
- Recorded: 2014
- Studio: torre pacheco city studio of sound
- Genre: Dance; Hip hop; Electro
- Length: 2:52
- Songwriter: Amador Rivas
- Producer: Tremenda Recordings

"Mandanga Style" is a 2015 single by Pablo Chiapella. The song is featured in TV series La Que Se Avecina. This song, especially its MV was affected by "gangnam style" by PSY from South Korea.

The song, a mix of Dance, Hip-Hop and Electro, contains words such as "vividor follador" (playboy fucker) or "borderline" and Amador Rivas' nicknames as Capitán Salami and Espartaco.

During the two months that there was no official version, the song was a success, with more than 6 million views on YouTube in the first month after its appearance. Song files extracted from the episode, for downloading and sending audio between mobile phones were created, reaching more people and being able to hear in clubs.
