= Ainhoa Larrañaga =

Spanish actress and singer (born 2000)

- Larrañaga in 2020
- Born: Ainhoa Larrañaga Arrizabalaga; 30 June 2000 (age 26); Hernani, Gipuzkoa, Spain
- Occupations: Actress; singer
- Years active: 2015–present

Ainhoa Larrañaga Arrizabalaga (born 30 June 2000) is a Spanish actress and singer.

== Biography ==
Larrañaga was born in Hernani, Gipuzkoa. She won the television singing competition Kantugiro in 2015, and later was a coach on the talent series Bago!az from 2017 to 2019. In 2020, she released her debut studio album, Eskuminak. Her second studio album, Medusa, was released in 2024.

== Filmography ==
=== Television ===
Year	Title	Role	Notes	Ref.
2015	Kantugiro	Herself; contestant		
2016–2023	Go!azen	Eli	48 episodes	
2017–2019	Bago!az	Herself; coach	3 seasons	
2020	Servir y proteger	Victoria	21 episodes	
2021	The Boarding School: Las Cumbres	Yolanda	1 episode	
2022–present	La que se avecina	Julia Guijarro	35 episodes	
2025–present	Desagertuta	María	8 episodes	

== Discography ==
=== Studio albums ===
- Eskuminak (2020)
- Medusa (2024)
