= Luis Miguel Seguí =

Spanish actor and producer (born 1976)

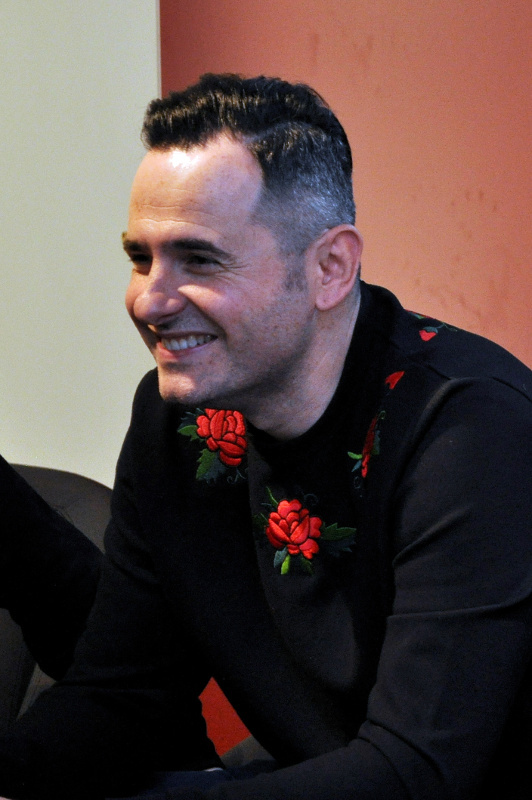
- Seguí in 2014
- Born: October 4, 1976 (age 49); Alicante, Spain
- Occupation: Actor
- Known for: La que se avecina
- Spouse: Antonia San Juan (m. 2009; div. 2015)

Luis Miguel Seguí (born October 4, 1976) is a Spanish actor and producer, He played Leo in La que se avecina until his retirement at the ninth season in 2015.
