= Cristina Medina =

Spanish actress

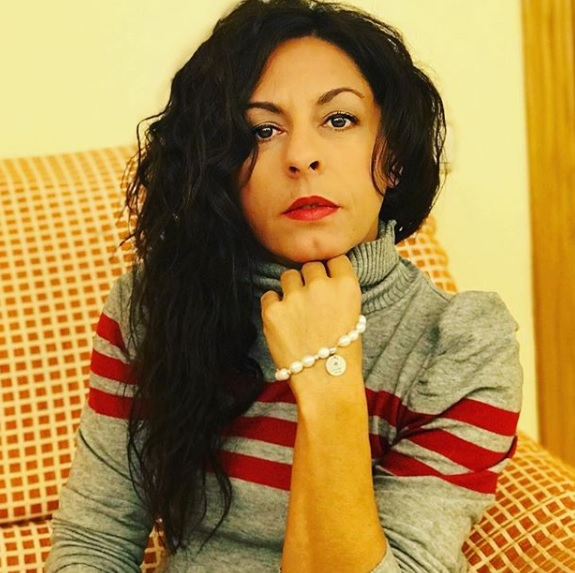
- Born: Cristina Eugenia Medina Conde; 8 April 1971 (age 55); Seville, Spain
- Occupation: Actress
- Years active: 1997–present

Cristina Eugenia Medina Conde (Seville; April 8, 1971) is a Spanish actress, singer and theater producer. Known for her role as Nines Chacón in the Telecinco series La que se avecina.

== Biography ==
She worked for theater companies such as Atalaya, TNT, or Centro Andaluz de Teatro until 1997, when she formed, together with Joan Estrader, the humor theater company Pez en Raya. Which she used to get seven titles that have been all over the world and have won national and international awards.

Cristina Medina founded her own production company, LaMedinaEs, in 2014 and is the creator of shows. Debuting in music with the show A Grito Pelao, a mixture of absurd humor and rock that deserved the creation of the band La Cristi & los que vengan, they are currently working on the creation of the first album to be called Gloria para ti.

In 2017, the company embarks on the co-production of the play Ay, Carmela!, directed by Fernando Soto and performed by herself along with Santiago Molero.

Between 2008 and 2021, she appeared in the Telecinco series La que se avecina in which she plays Nines Chacón in the second season.

On September 25, 2021, she announced to her Instagram followers that she has breast cancer.

== Filmography ==
=== Television ===
Series

Year	Series	Role	Duration
1992	Teletrastos	Hojalato	92 episodes
2011	Museo Coconut	Patri	1 episode
2013	Esposados	Herself	1 episode
2008 – 2021	La que se avecina	Angelines "Nines" Chacón	154 episodes

Programs

Year	Program	Role	Channel
2019	Dar cera, pulir #0	Guest	Movistar+
2019	Pasapalabra	Guest	Telecinco
2019	Safari: a la caza de la tele	Guest	FDF
2019	Ilustres ignorantes	Guest	Movistar+
2020	Typical Spanish	Guest	La 1
2021 – present	La noche D	Collaborator	La 1

=== Theater ===
Year	Play	Directed by
1999	Tápate	
2001	Pésame mucho	
2004	Sólala	
2007	Lo cerebro	
2012	Llorar por llorar	
2014	A grito pelao	
2016	El trámite	
2017 – present	¡Ay Carmela!	Fernando Soto
2018	La Cristi & los que vengan	
2018 – present	Lunátika	Remedios Crespo
2018	El Gran Despipote	Gabriel Olivares

== Awards ==
- 1996: Award for Best Andalusian Actress with Miles Gloriosus (TNT).
- 2003: Audience Award for Best Show at the IX International Festival of Humor in Madrid with Tápate (Pez en Raya).
- 2003: Prize to the best show of the season in Bath and Winchester with Pésame mucho (Pez en Raya).
- 2004: Prize to the best show at the XXI Feria de Teatro de Tárrega with Sólala (Pez en Raya).
- 2005: Award to the best show at the XI International Festival of Humor of Madrid (Pez en Raya).
- 2018: Award for best show at the Palma de Río Theater Fair with ¡Ay, Carmela! (LaMedinaEs Company).
