= Manuel Andrés =

Spanish writer and actor

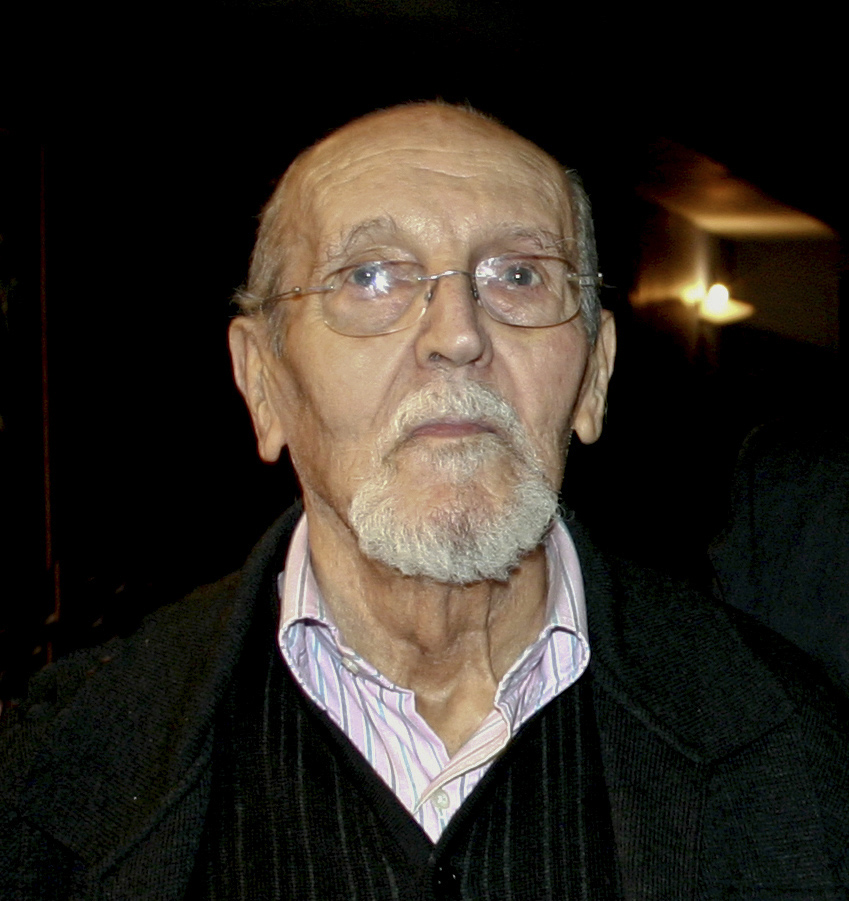
- Manuel Andrés in 2008
- Born: Manuel Andrés González; 17 March 1930; Valencia, Spain
- Died: 1 September 2013 (aged 83); Valencia, Spain
- Occupations: Writer and actor
- Years active: 1954–2009

Manuel Andrés González (17 March 1930 – 1 September 2013) was a Spanish writer and actor known for his role as Julián Pastor in the TV series La que se avecina.

In 1954 he played Rosas de otoño, by Jacinto Benavente, with Irene López Heredia in Madrid. His biggest important role at stage were La viuda valenciana (1960), and El anzuelo de Fenisa (1961), both by Lope de Vega; De pronto, una noche... (1964), by Alfonso Paso; and La fiaca (1994), by Ricardo Talesnik.

In 2009 he was awarded by the Premio Especial Tirant (2009).

He died on 1 September 2013 after suffering a respiratory failure at age of 83.

== Filmography ==
=== Films ===
- 2009 – Perder el tiempo
- 2007 – Buscando a Emma
- 2007 – Ladrones
- 2006 – Cartas de Sorolla
- 2004 – Sucedió en España
- 2004 – Tiovivo c. 1950
- 2002 – Primer y último amor
- 2002 – Mi casa es tu casa
- 2001 – La fuga
- 2000 – Terca vida
- 1993 – Tres palabras
- 1975 – Manchas de sangre en un coche nuevo
- 1972 – Ligue story
- 1970 – El cronicón
- 1967 – De cuerpo presente
- 1996 – Fantasía 3

=== Television ===
- 1964 – Confidencias
- 1964 – Escuela de maridos
- 1969 – La risa española
- 1970 – Hora vez
- 1973 – Teatro Catalán
- 1974 – Silencio, estrenamos
- 1980 – Estudio 1
- 1982 – Ramón y Cajal: Historia de una voluntad
- 1982 – La máscara negra
- 1983 – Anillos de oro
- 1986 – Segunda enseñanza
- 1991 – La huella del crimen
- 1992 – Primero izquierda
- 1993 – Lleno, por favor
- 1994 – Encantada de la vida
- 1994 – ¡Ay, Señor, Señor!
- 1996 – La casa de los líos
- 1998 – Hermanas
- 1998 – Manos a la obra
- 1999 – 7 vidas
- 2001 – Periodistas
- 2002 – Policías, en el corazón de la calle
- 2003 – Arroz y tartana
- 2004 – ¿Se puede?
- 2004 – Manolito Gafotas
- 2004 – Mis adorables vecinos
- 2006 – Amistades peligrosas
- 2006 – Aquí no hay quien viva
- 2006 – Fuera de control
- 2006 – Los simuladores
- 2006–2007 – SMS
- 2007 – Cafetería Manhattan
- 2007 – Los Serrano
- 2007 -2008 – La que se avecina
- 2007 – Génesis: En la mente del asesino
- 2008 – Sin tetas no hay paraíso
- 2008 – Hospital Central

=== Short films ===
- 2009 – Perder el tiempo
- 2007 – Acuérdate de mí
- 2007 – A primera vista
- 2006 – Vida de la ONU muerto
- 2005 – Envejece conmigo
- 2004 – Las hormigas acuden puntuales a las citas
- 2002 – Soñando al Fénix

=== Miniseries ===
- 1995 – La Regenta
