= Laura Gómez-Lacueva =

Spanish actress (1975–2023)

- Born: 24 February 1975; Zaragoza, Spain
- Died: 30 March 2023 (aged 48); Zaragoza, Spain

Laura Gómez-Lacueva (24 February 1975 – 30 March 2023) was a Spanish film, stage and television actress and comedian.

== Life and career ==
Born in Zaragoza, Gómez-Lacueva studied at the Escuela Municipal de Teatro de Zaragoza from 1994 to 1997, and later enrolled in courses of clowning, dramaturgy, dance, singing and cinematography. She was mainly active on stage, where she founded the stage companies Muac Teatro, Nueve de Nueve Teatro and (together with director Paco de La Zaranda and playwright Eusebio Calonge) La Extinta Poética. In films, her best known role was the villain Tina in Javier Fesser's Historias lamentables. On television, she was best known for her roles in the comedy series La que se avecina and El pueblo, and she was also well known for her participation in the comedy show Oregon TV, in which she impersonated popular singers such as Ana Belén and Laura Pausini performing parody songs.

In 2022, Gómez-Lacueva was awarded the Premio Simón for best stage actress. She died of cancer on 30 March 2023, at the age of 48.

She was posthumously recognised as Favourite Daughter of Zaragoza in 2023.
