= Antonia San Juan =

Spanish actress, director and screenwriter

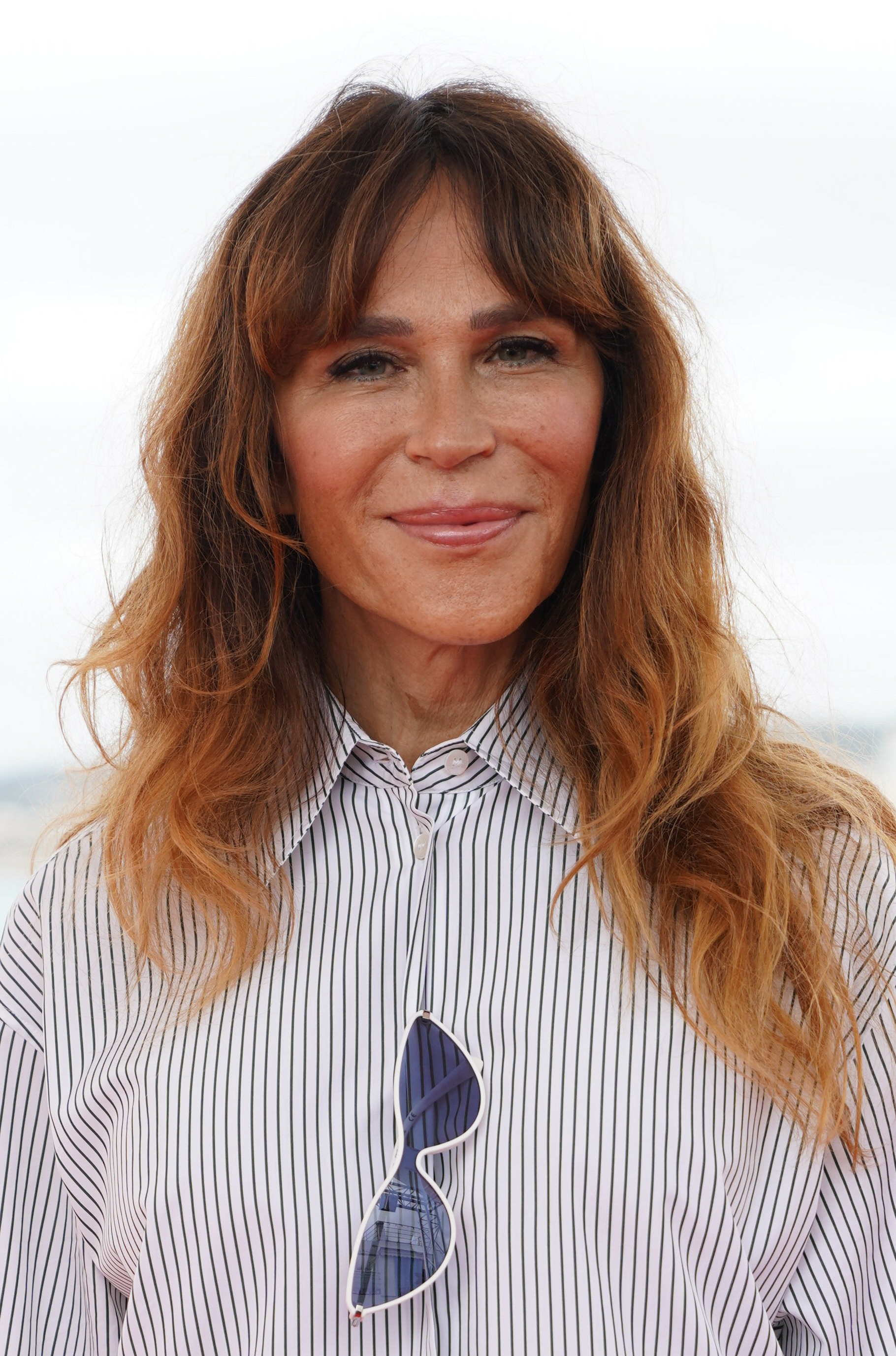
- San Juan in 2019
- Born: 22 May 1961 (age 65); Las Palmas, Spain
- Occupation: Actress
- Years active: 1994–present
- Spouse: Luis Miguel Seguí (m. 2009; div. 2015)

Antonia San Juan Fernández (born 22 May 1961) is a Spanish actress, director and screenwriter.

== Biography ==
Antonia San Juan was born in Las Palmas, in the Canary Islands. At 19 she established in Madrid, where she worked as a professional theatre actress and also as a cabaret act in pubs and bars. She became known for her role as Agrado in Todo sobre mi madre by Pedro Almodóvar. She is well known in Spain not only because of her film career but also for her humorous monologues on television and theatre. Since 2009 she has been acting in the popular Spanish TV series La que se avecina, playing the part of Estela Reynolds, the eccentric mother of Lola.

She is an atheist and is highly critical of religion, calling it a "cancer to society."

In September 2025, she announced she had been diagnosed with cancer and that she would temporarily retire from the stage to undergo treatment.

== Filmography ==
=== Film ===
- La vida siempre es corta – 1994
- Perdona bonita, pero Lucas me quería a mí – 1997
- La primera noche de mi vida – 1998
- El grito en el cielo – 1998
- Ataque verbal – 1999
- Manolito Gafotas – 1999
- All About My Mother (Todo sobre mi madre) – 1999
- Hongos – 1999
- El pan de cada día, El – 2000
- Asfalto – 2000
- V.O. – 2001
- Octavia – 2002
- La balsa de piedra – 2002
- Amnèsia – 2002
- Piedras – 2002
- Venganza – 2002
- 238 – 2003
- Colours – 2003
- Mela y sus hermanas – 2004
- Te llevas la palma – 2004
- La china – 2005
- Un buen día – 2005
- Un dulce despertar – 2005
- El hambre – 2005
- La maldad de las cosas – 2005
- La nevera – 2005
- La caja – 2006
- Del lado del verano – 2012
- The Platform (El Hoyo) – 2019

=== Television ===
TV series
| year | Title | Role | Network | Episodes |
|---|---|---|---|---|
| 2009 – 2010; 2013 – 2014 | La que se avecina | Estela Reynolds | Telecinco | 40 episodes |
| 2012 | Frágiles | Julia | Telecinco | 1 episode |
| 2014 | Fantasmagórica | Clara | web series | 2 episodes |
| 2014–2015 | Gym Tony | Berta Palomero | Cuatro | 110 episodes |
| 2019 | Hierro | Samir | Movistar | 3 episodes |

== Bibliography ==
- Alfaro, Luis (7 December 1999). "Nearly all about Antonia". The Advocate (USA). pp. 88–89. Archived from the original on 5 May 2008.
