= Ricardo Arroyo (actor) =

Spanish actor

- Born: Ricardo Arroyo García; 28 November 1950 (age 75); Barcelona, Spain
- Occupation: Actor
- Known for: La que se avecina

Ricardo Arroyo García (born 28 November 1950) is a Spanish actor, best known for his performance as Vicente Maroto on the Spanish television series La que se avecina, and as Higinio Heredia in Aquí no hay quien viva.
