= Nacho Guerreros =

Spanish actor (born 1973)

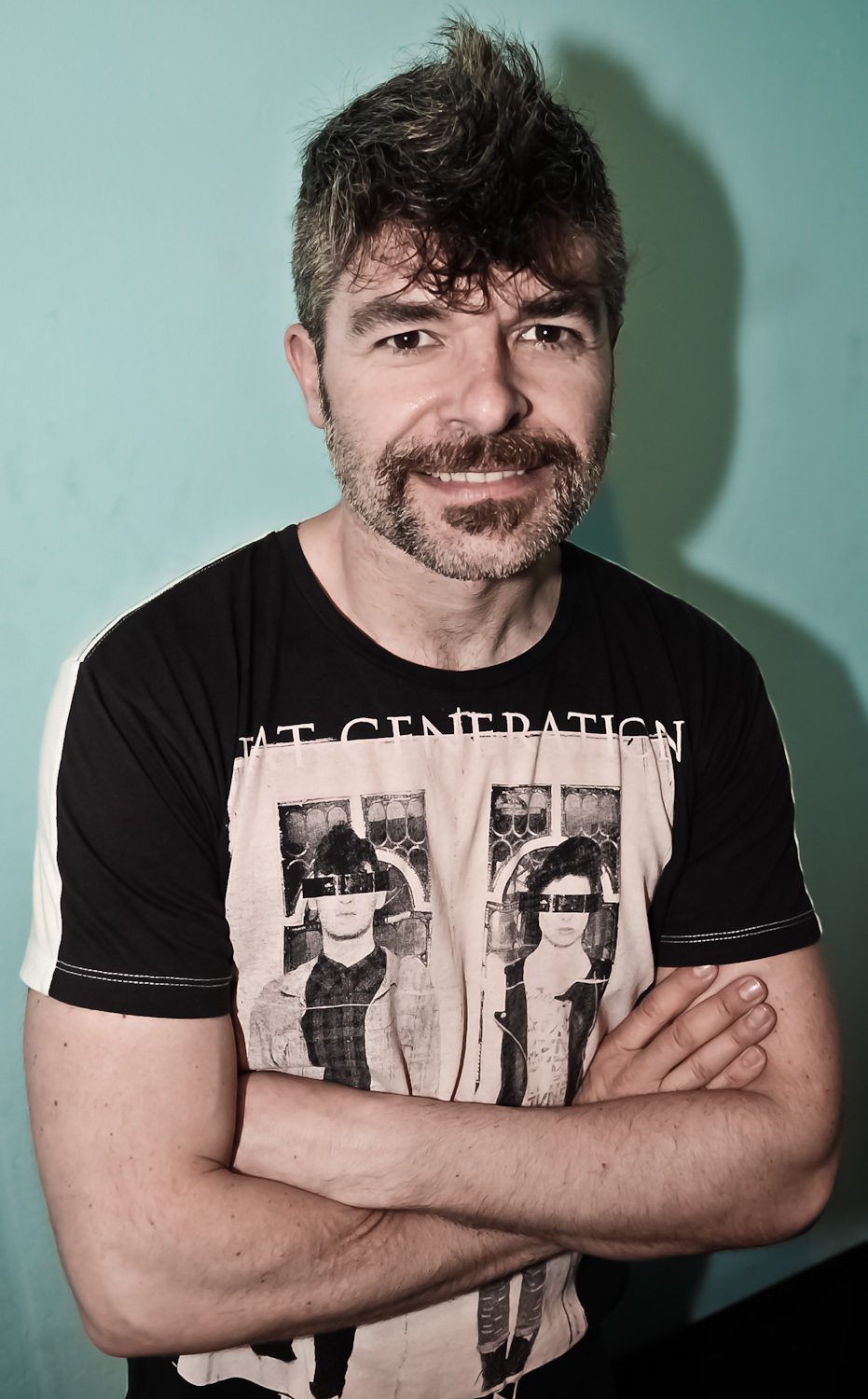
- Guerreros in 2012
- Born: Ignacio Guerreros García; December 5, 1970 (age 55); Calahorra (La Rioja), Spain
- Occupation: Actor
- Years active: 1998–present
- Height: 1.7 m (5 ft 7 in)

Ignacio Guerreros García (born December 5, 1973), better known as Nacho Guerreros, is a Spanish actor, known for the role of Coque in the television series La que se avecina.

== Biography ==
Guerreros was born in Calahorra, La Rioja; later living in Vitoria, where he joined a theatre group, before moving to Madrid in 1991 to study theater.

Before becoming an actor he had a number of jobs such as working with disabled people, waiting tables, and starting, with other partners, a decorating firm in Madrid.

His most known role is of Coque in the television series La que se avecina. He also acted in Aquí no hay quien viva, as Jose María in the last stage of the television series.

In theater, his most prominent role has been in Martin Scherman's Bent, directed by Gina Piccirilli, for which he was nominated best actor of theater in 2005 by the "Union of Actors".

In 2012 he was named "Calagurratino de Honor" by the Calahorra town hall (his hometown).

On October 25, 2014, he began his participation in the political debate program Un tiempo nuevo of Telecinco in the section Un país a raya. He also took part in a program of street micro-theater.

== Filmography ==
=== TV Series ===
- 2014 – Un tiempo nuevo

==== As an actor ====
- 2010 Con Pelos en la lengua
- 2007 La que se avecina
- 2006 Aquí no hay quien viva
- 2004 Mis estimadas víctimas
- 2003 Hospital Central
- 2001 El secreto
- 2001 Manos a la obra
- 2000 ¡Ala... Dina!
- 1998 A las once en casa

=== Theater ===
- 2005 – 2006 Bent
- 2003 Jesús de Nazaret
- 2003 El dragón de fuego
- 1998–2001 Café Teatro

=== Shorts ===
- 2009 Lala
- 2004 Eric
- 2003 Sin remite
- 2003 Memoria y muerte de una cortometrajista
- 2002 Tiro de piedra
- 2001 Hævn (venganza)
- 2000 Una mañana
