= José Luis Gil =

Spanish actor

Jose Luis Gil
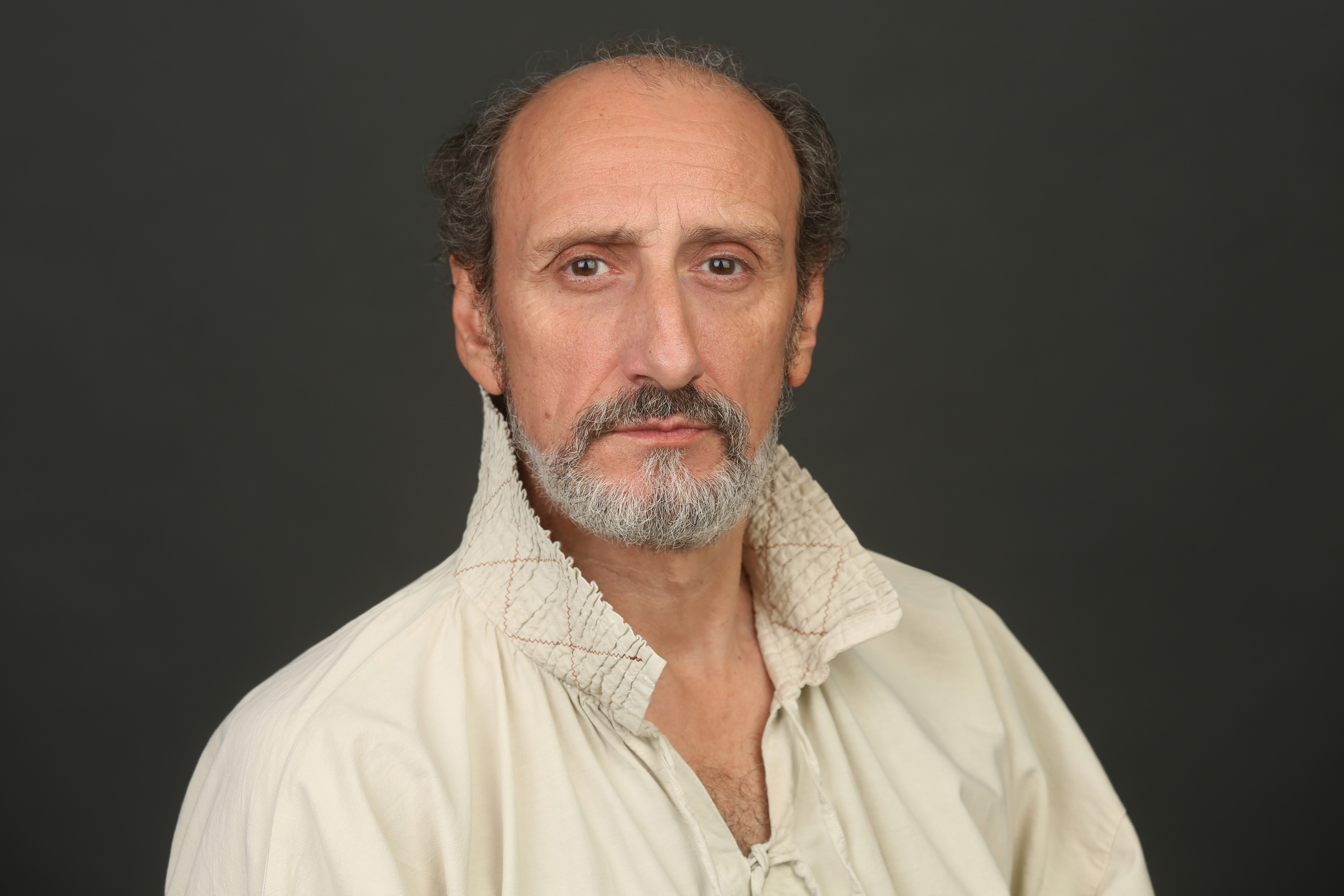
- José Luis Gil in 2016
- Born: José Luis Gil Sanz; 9 December 1957 (age 68); Zaragoza, Spain
- Occupation: Actor
- Years active: 1988–2021
- Spouse: Carolina Montijano
- Children: 3: Irene; Marta; Daniel

José Luis Gil Sanz (born 9 December 1957) is a retired Spanish actor.

== Career ==
He started his career when he was ten years old. His most popular roles are Juan Cuesta in the TV series Aquí no hay quien viva and Enrique Pastor in La que se avecina, but he has worked as a voice actor since the 1970s.

He dubbed Tim Allen in the TV series Last Man Standing (2011–2017). In 2013 Carmen Ruiz and José Luis Gil were awarded by the Premio Talento de Comedia del Festival de Cine de Comedia de Tarazona y Moncayo.

On 4 November 2021 he suffered an ischemic stroke that was announced on 1 December 2021, and he remained in hospital until 24 November. By September 2026, he is still in recovery and not able to work. According to his daughter, he won't be able to work again because he has difficulty with speech.

== Personal life ==
He got married with Carolina Montijano, with whom he has three children, Marta, Daniel and Irene Gil Montijano.

== Filmography (movies) ==
=== As an actor ===
- 2009 - Brain Drain
- 2009 – Fuga de cerebros
- 2002 – En la ciudad sin límites
- 1999 – Lisboa
- 1996 – Teresa y Vanessa
- 1994 – Todo es mentira
- 1991 – Cómo levantar 1000 kilos

=== As a voiceover actor ===
- 2021 Shang-Chi and the Legend of the Ten Rings
- 2007 Donkey Xote
- 2005
  - El sueño de una noche de San Juan
  - Valiant
- 2003 – Finding Nemo
- 2002 – Peter Pan. Regreso al país de Nunca Jamás
- 2000 – Buzz Lightyear: La película
- 1999
  - Runaway Bride
  - Tarzán
  - Toy Story 2
- 1998 – The Big Lebowski
- 1997 – Volcano
- 1996
  - Independence Day
  - Showgirls
- 1995
  - Braveheart
  - Nueve meses
  - Toy Story
- 1994 – Ace Ventura: A Pet Detective
- 1994 - The Crow
- 1996 – James and the Giant Peach
- 1988 – Who Framed Roger Rabbit
- 1987 – Dirty Dancing
- 1983 – The Outsiders
- 1979 – The Life of Brian

== Filmography (TV-series) ==
=== As an actor ===
- 2007 – La que se avecina
- 2003–2006 Aquí no hay quien viva
- 2001
  - Agente 700
  - El comisario
- 1998 – Fernández y familia

=== As a voiceover actor ===
- 2000 – Buzz Lightyear: Guardianes del espacio
- 1995 – The X-Files
- 1989 – I, Claudius
- 1983 – Fraggle Rock
- 1981 – Dogtanian and the Three Muskehounds
