= Vanesa Romero =

Spanish actress and model (born 1978)

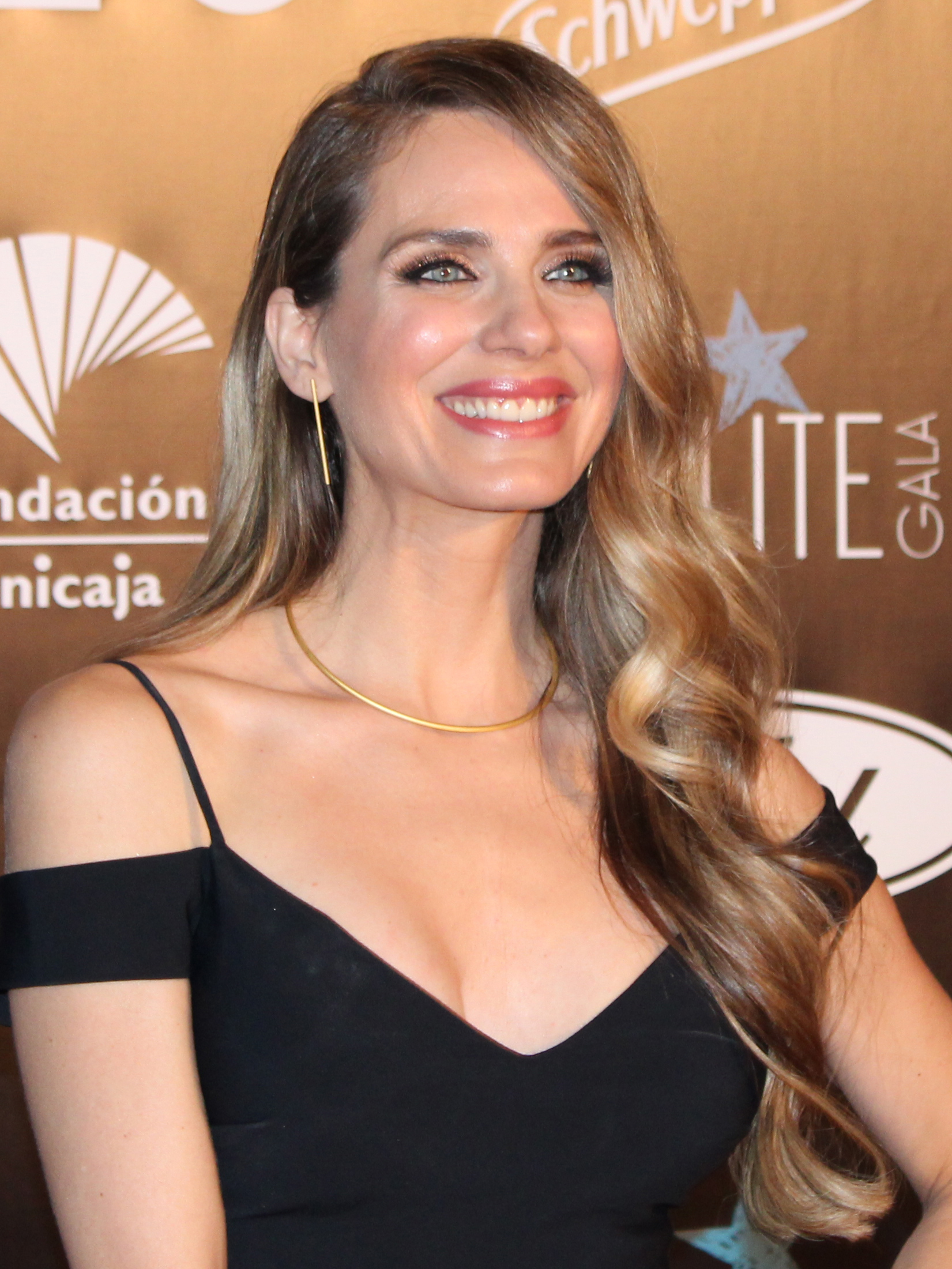
- Romero at the Starlite Gala in 2019
- Born: 4 June 1978 (age 47); Alicante, Spain
- Occupations: Actress and model
- Known for: Aquí no hay quien viva; La que se avecina
- Height: 168 cm (5 ft 6 in)
- Spouse: Alberto Caballero (m. 2012–2013)
- Website: vanesaromero.es

Vanesa Romero Torres (born 4 June 1978) is a Spanish actress and model, mostly known for her roles as Ana in Aquí no hay quien viva and Raquel in La que se avecina.

In 1995 she was chosen dama del foc. In 1998 she became Miss Alicante 1998, so she participated as Miss España.

On 11 September 2012 she was married with Alberto Caballero after six years of romance, and they broke up the next year. She has three cats (Humphrey, Uma and Audrey) and two Yorkshire Terrier dogs (Lucas and Betty).

She hosted the 2012 Twelve Grapes with Jordi Sánchez.

From 28 March 2016 she uploads videos on YouTube. She published Reflexiones de una rubia, about his life, and it got good reviews.

== Filmography ==
=== Films ===
- 4 Años (2020) as Rosa
- El viajero (2017) as Lucía
- Save the Zombies (2013) as Mara
- La última mano (2012) as Eva
- 9 meses (2010) as Clara
- The Sindone (2009) as María
- En la misma noche, regia Alejandro Amenàbar (2025)

=== Television series ===
- La que se avecina (2007-2021) as Raquel Villanueva
- Entre dos reinos (2011) as Leonor
- Aquí no hay quien viva (2005-2006) as Ana
- ¡Ala... Dina! (2000) as SuperLidia
- Una de dos (1999) as Loli
