= Victor Hassan =

Association football player

Victor Hassan ויקטור חסן
Personal information
- Full name: Victor "Pengal" Hassan
- Place of birth: Tunisia

Youth career
- Maccabi Netanya

Senior career*
Years	Team	Apps	(Gls)
1963–1968	Maccabi Netanya	79	(19)
- * Club domestic league appearances and goals

Victor "Pengal" Hassan (Hebrew: ויקטור "פנגל" חסן), is a former Israeli footballer who played in Maccabi Netanya in the 1960s.

He is of Tunisian-Jewish descent.

== Honours ==
- Second Division
  - 1963–64
