= Laura Caballero =

Spanish TV director and screenwriter (born 1978)

- Born: Laura Rodríguez Caballero; 18 February 1978 (age 48); Madrid, Spain
- Occupations: TV director, screenwriter
- Years active: 2003–present
- Known for: Aquí no hay quien viva; La que se avecina; Alpha Males
- Spouse: Sergio Mitjans (m. 2013–2015)
- Partner: Daniel Fernández Altares (2017)
- Relatives: Alberto Caballero

Laura Rodríguez Caballero (born 18 February 1978) is a Spanish TV director and screenwriter.

She is the screenwriter and executive producer of Aquí no hay quien viva and La que se avecina, alongside her brother Alberto Caballero. In 2022, she directed and co-wrote (with her brother) the comedy television series Alpha Males.

In 2013, she married Sergio Mitjans, with whom she worked on La que se avecina. The couple has since broken up.

== Filmography ==
- Aquí no hay quien viva (writer: 2003–2005; director: 2003–2006)
- A tortas con la vida (director: 2005)
- La que se avecina (writer, director: 2007–2022
- El cadáver exquisito (assistant director: 2011)
- El pueblo (writer: 2019; director: 2019–2021)
- Alpha Males (writer, director: 2022)
