= La que se avecina =

Spanish sitcom

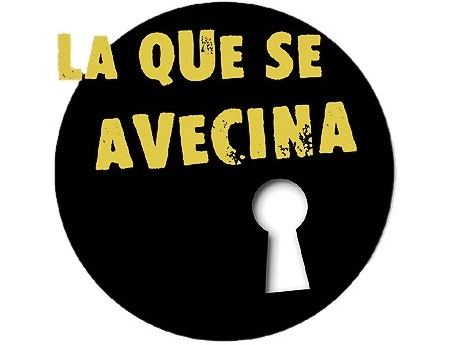
- Logo of the show
- Genre: Sitcom; Black comedy
- Created by: Alberto Caballero; Laura Caballero; Daniel Deorador
- Written by: Alberto Caballero; Laura Caballero; Daniel Deorador; Sergio Mitjans
- Directed by: Laura Caballero
- Starring: Silvia Abril; María Adánez; Malena Alterio; Manuel Andrés; Carlos Areces; Fabio Arcidiácono; Ricardo Arroyo; Mariví Bilbao; Carlota Boza; Fernando Boza; Beatriz Carvajal; Cristina Castaño; María Casal; Pablo Chiapella; Adrià Collado; Gemma Cuervo; Rodrigo Espinar; Eduardo García; José Luis Gil; Eduardo Gómez; Macarena Gómez; Elio González; Nacho Guerreros; Miren Ibarguren; Eva Isanta; Loles León; Petra Martínez; Cristina Medina; Luis Merlo; Sofia Nieto; Ricardo Nkosi; Isabel Ordaz; Guillermo Ortega; Antonio Pagudo; Víctor Palmero; Emma Penella; Vanesa Romero; Antonia San Juan; Roberto San Martín; Jordi Sánchez; Luis Miguel Seguí; Ernesto Sevilla; Nathalie Seseña; Fernando Tejero; Amparo Valle
- Opening theme: "La que se avecina" by Big Bang Boka
- Country of origin: Spain
- Original language: Spanish
- No. of seasons: 15
- No. of episodes: 194

Production
- Executive producers: Alberto Caballero; Esther Jiménez
- Camera setup: Multiple-camera
- Running time: 85–95 minutes
- Production companies: Alba Adriática (2007–2010); Infinia (2010–2013); Contubernio (2013–)

Original release
- Network: Telecinco
- Release: 22 April 2007 – present

Related
- Aquí no hay quien viva (2003–2006)

La que se avecina is a Spanish television sitcom created by Alberto Caballero, Laura Caballero and Daniel Deorador. The show is set in the fictitious Mirador de Montepinar, a condominium located in the suburbs of Madrid. The show is an indirect successor to the Antena 3 comedy Aquí no hay quien viva. The title is both an expression meaning "the trouble that is approaching" and a pun on "la casa vecina" - the neighbouring house - and so it alludes to the show's neighbourly setting as well as the regular quarrels between the characters.

La que se avecina debuted on Telecinco, and was later rerun by the same network as well as cable/satellite channels FDF and Comedy Central España. The series debuted on 22 April 2007, the show began to become much more prominent in its third season, becoming one of the most widely watched shows in Spain. Most characters in the show are stereotypical representations of different groups in Spanish society and occasionally pokes fun at Spanish politics.

== Series overview ==
The story takes place in a block of relatively luxurious flats. Common themes in the story are the problems faced by people sharing apartments in Spain, the Spanish property bubble, and the hardships faced by young people trying to find a place to live. The block of flats itself is in the outskirts of the city, around 15 minutes from the centre. There are 3 floors, with a total of 10 flats. The residential area also contains a car park, the caretaker's office, commercial spaces and some communal areas.

Series	Episodes	Originally released	
Series	Episodes	First released	Last released
1	13	22 April 2007	22 July 2007
2	15	3 April 2008	3 August 2008
3	14	10 June 2009	16 September 2009
4	12	26 May 2010	4 August 2010
5	13	1 May 2011	24 July 2011
6	13	1 October 2012	28 January 2013
7	13	2 December 2013	10 March 2014
8	16	13 October 2014	18 May 2015
9	19	5 April 2016	28 November 2016
10	13	4 October 2017	8 January 2018
11	13	24 April 2019	17 December 2019
12	16	29 May 2020	8 January 2021
13	8	18 November 2022	23 December 2022
14	8	8 November 2023	22 December 2023

== Reception ==
=== Ratings ===
Viewership and ratings per season of La que se avecina
Season	Timeslot (ET)	Episodes	First aired		Last aired		Avg. viewers (millions)
Season	Timeslot (ET)	Episodes	Date	Viewers (millions)	Date	Viewers (millions)	Avg. viewers (millions)
1	Monday 10:30 pm	13	22 April 2007	4.16	22 July 2007	2.17	3.18
2	Monday 10:30 pm	15	3 April 2008	3.31	3 August 2008	2.17	2.86
3	Monday 10:30 pm	14	10 June 2009	2.61	16 September 2009	2.37	2.17
4	Monday 10:30 pm	12	26 May 2010	1.50	4 August 2010	2.28	2.18
5	Monday 10:30 pm	13	1 May 2011	3.06	24 July 2011	2.79	2.79
6	Monday 10:30 pm	13	1 October 2012	5.40	28 January 2013	3.89	4.14
7	Monday 10:30 pm	13	2 December 2013	4.69	10 March 2014	3.88	4.10
8	Monday 10:30 pm	16	13 October 2014	4.46	18 May 2015	4.17	4.00
9	Monday 10:30 pm	19	5 April 2016	5.00	28 November 2016	3.50	3.68
10	Monday 10:30 pm	13	4 October 2017	3.62	21 December 2017	2.52	2.93
11	Monday 10:30 pm	13	24 April 2019	3.18	17 December 2019	2.32	2.52

== Cast and characters ==
=== Main characters ===
Actor	Character	Season																
Actor	Character	1	2	3	4	5	6	7	8	9	10	11	12	13	14	15	16	17
Pablo Chiapella	Amador Rivas	Main	Main	Main	Main	Main	Main	Main	Main	Main	Main	Main	Main	Main	Main	Main	Main	Main
Nacho Guerreros	Coque Calatrava	Main	Main	Main	Main	Main	Main	Main	Main	Main	Main	Main	Main	Main	Main	Main	Main	Main
Eva Isanta	Maite Figueroa	Main	Main	Main	Main	Main	Main	Main	Main	Main	Main	Main	Main	Main	Main	Main	Main	Main
Jordi Sánchez	Antonio Recio	Main	Main	Main	Main	Main	Main	Main	Main	Main	Main	Main	Main	Main	Main	Main	Main	Main
Nathalie Seseña	Berta Escobar	Main	Main	Main	Main	Main	Main	Main	Main	Main	Main	Main	Main	Main	Main	Main	Main	Main
Macarena Gómez	Lola Trujillo	Main	Main	Main	Main	Guest	Main	Main	Main	Main	Main	Main	Main	Rec.	Main	Main	Main	Main
Adriá Collado	Sergio Arias	Main	Main				Main									G.	Main	Main
Carlos Alcalde	Rosario Parrales				G.	Main	Rec.							Rec.	Rec.	Rec.	Rec.	Rec.
María Adánez	Rebeca Ortiz							Main	Main							Main	Main	Main
Petra Martínez	Fina Palomares								Main	Main	Main	Main	Main	Main	Main	Main	Main	Main
Miren Ibarguren	Yolanda Morcillo									Main	Main	Main	Main	Main	Main	Main	Main	Main
Luis Merlo	Bruno Quiroga									Main	Main	Main	Main	Main	Main	Main	Main	Main
Loles León	Menchu Carrascosa									Rec.	Main	Main	Main	Main	Main	Main	Main	Main
Carlos Areces	Agustín Gordillo											Main	Main	Main	Main	Main	Main	Main
Margarita Asquerino	Logi Sarrión													Main	Main	Main	Main	Main
Mamen García	Victoria Rafaela													Main	Main	Main	Main	Main
Félix Gómez	Óscar Serra													Main	Main	Main	Main	Main
Laura Gómez-Lacueva (†); Rocío Marín	Greta Garmendia													Main	Main	Main	Main	Main
Elisabeth Larena	Andy Quirón													Main	Main	Main	Main	Main
Carlos Chamarro	Esteban Guijarro													Main	Main	Main	Main	Main
Ainhoa Larrañaga	Julia Guijarro													Rec.	Main	Main	Main	Main
Ana Arias	Cristina San Román														Main	Main	Main	Main
Raúl Peña	Martín Segurola														Main	Main	Main	Main

- Pablo Chiapella as Amador Rivas, father of Carlota, Fernando and Rodrigo, former bank employee now without stable work and divorced from Maite.
- Jordi Sánchez as Antonio Recio, husband of Berta, father of Alba (with Berta) and Toñín (with Nines via IV), seafood wholesaler.
- Nacho Guerreros as Jorge "Coque" Calatrava, a stoner, former gardener, now caretaker of the building.
- Nathalie Seseña as Berta Escobar, wife of Antonio. She is a devoted Christian.
- Eva Isanta as Maité Figueroa, former wife of Amador, mother of Carolta, Fernando, Rodrigo and Amador Jr (with Sergio), without permanent employment who was sentenced to jail. In season 8, she became a best-selling erotic writer.
- Macarena Gómez as María Dolores "Lola" Trujillo, former photographer turned successful actress who is now unable to find any job. She divorced from Javi in season 12.
- María Adánez as Rebeca Ortiz, a divorce lawyer who is an old high school friend from Judith.
- Petra Martínez as Fina Palomares, a retired elderly woman who drive the neighbours crazy.
- Miren Ibarguren as Yolanda Morcillo. She is a haberdasher and dreams to become a well known fashion designer.
- Loles León as Menchu, Yolanda's loud mother.
- Carlos Areces as Agustín Gordillo, a man who suffers from dissociative identity disorder.
- Laura Gómez Lacueva as Greta Garmendia, the iron-fisted board president of Contubernio 49.
- Carlos Chamarro as Esteban Guijarro, Greta's tax inspector husband that doesn't like conflict.
- Mamen García as Victoria Rafaela Balmaseda de Unzeta y Téllez-Girón, marquise of Francavilla and Sacromonte, a grumpy aristocrat at bankruptcy that owns apartments at Contubernio 49.
- Margarita Asquerino as Logi, a Contubernio 49 resident, Victoria Rafaela's maid and her only friend.
- Félix Gómez as Óscar Serra, a charismatic and wealthy fashion photographer living at Contubernio 49.
- Elizabeth Larena as Andy, a waitress living with Karma and Giorgi in a rented apartment at Contubernio 49.
- Ainhoa Larrañaga as Julia Guijarro, daughter of Greta and Esteban, lives on Contubernio 49 with her family.
- Ana Arias repraisin her role from El Pueblo as Cristina San Román, a married dentist who moves in from a small town with her newborn.
- Raúl Peña repraisin his role from El Pueblo as Martín Segurola, a married chef who moves in from a small town with his newborn.

=== Recurring characters ===
- Carlota Boza as Carlota Rivas, Amador and Maite's older daughter. (Seasons 1-current)
- Fernando Boza as Fernando "Nano" Rivas, Amador and Maite's middle son. (Seasons 1-current)
- Rodrigo Espinar, as Rodrigo Rivas, Amador and Maite's younger son. (Seasons 1-current)
- Álvaro Giraldo as Amador Arias Figueroa, also known as "Ojos de pollo", the son of Sergio and Maité result of an extra-marital affair that Maité had while married to Amador. (Seasons 2-current)
- Adam Sounita as Toñin, The in-vitro son of Nines and Antonio. It was supposed to be a surprise son for Berta, but she rejected it. (Seasons 2–12, 15)
- Fran Nortés as Father Alejandro. He is the priest Berta use to visit. (Seasons 3–4, 7-current)
- Matilde Fluixa as Doña Tránsito, a religious friend of Berta. (Seasons 9-current)
- Dario Paso as Josito, Yoli's socially unadapted brother. (Seasons 9-current)
- Helena Dueñas as Remedios Infante, a woman that works taking care of elderly that ends married to Vicente. (Seasons 12-current)
- Walker Liu as Xiang Li, the server at "La Grulla Shaolin". (Seasons 13-current)

=== Former main characters ===
Former characters
Actor	Character	Season																
Actor	Character	1	2	3	4	5	6	7	8	9	10	11	12	13	14	15	16	17
Malena Alterio	Cristina Aguilera	Main																
Emma Penella (†)	Charo de la Vega (†)	Main																
Fabio Arcidiácono	Fabio Sabatani	Main	G.															
Roberto San Martín	Silvio Ramírez	Main	Rec.															
Sofía Nieto	Sandra Espinosa	Main																
Elio González	Eric Cortés	Main																
Guillermo Ortega	Joaquín Arias	Main																
Manuel Andrés (†)	Julián Pastor (†)	Rec.	Main															
Mónica Pérez	Blanca Neruda		Main															
Beatriz Carvajal	Goya Gutiérrez (†)	Main																
Gemma Cuervo	Mari Tere Valverde	Main																
María Casal	Reyes Ballesteros					Main												
Amparo Valle (†)	Justi Latorre (†)					Main		G.										
Mariví Bilbao (†)	Izaskun Sagastume (†)	Main																
Eduardo García	Fran Pastor	Main																
Eduardo Gómez (†)	Máximo Angulo	Main																
Silvia Abril	Violeta Recio		Rec.			G.	Main											
Antonia San Juan	Estela Reynolds			Main			G.	Main										
Luis Miguel Seguí	Leonardo Romaní (†)	Main																
Cristina Castaño	Judith Becker			Main														
Isabel Ordaz	Araceli Madariaga	Main	G.			Main			Rec.	Main								
Antonio Pagudo	Javier Maroto	Main																
Ernesto Sevilla	Teodoro Rivas							G.	Rec.	Main					G.			
José Luis Gil	Enrique Pastor	Main																
Vanesa Romero	Raquel Villanueva	Main																
Cristina Medina	Nines Chacón		Main															
Víctor Palmero	Alba Recio	G.							G.	Main								
Darío Paso	Josito Morcillo									Rec.		Main						
Ricardo Nkosi	Ongombo										Rec.	Main						
Pepa Rus	Clara Gutiérrez										Rec.	Main						
Álex Gadea	Alonso Martínez													Main		Rec.		
Álex Delacroix	Karma													Main		G.		
Jaime Riba	Giorgi Verdugo													Main				
Ricardo Arroyo	Vicente Maroto	Main												Rec.		Guest		
Fernando Tejero	Fermín Trujillo						Rec.	Main										

- ^Note 1: The character of Alvaro Recio (later Alba Recio) was interpreted by Eduardo Espinilla in season 1 and Sergi Ruíz in seasons 2 and 3 before Victor takes the role in season 8.
- José Luis Gil as Enrique Pastor, ex-husband of Judith and Araceli, father of Fran, a long time city councillor, who becomes the city mayor in season 9.
- Vanesa Romero as Raquel Villanueva, former real estate agent director, cousin of Nines.
- Antonio Pagudo as Javier Maroto, husband of Lola, son of Vicente and Gregoria, computer technician
- Luis Miguel Seguí as Leonardo "Leo" Romaní, vacuum-cleaner salesman. He died in a parachuting accident while celebrating his wedding to Alba.
- Eduardo García as Francisco Javier "Fran" Pastor, son of Araceli and Enrique. He left Montepinar to live with his girlfriend in Brasil.
- Eduardo Gómez as Máximo "Maxi" Angulo, bar owner and ex-janitor of Montepinar.
- Mariví Bilbao as Izaskun Sagastume, retired smoker that escaped an asylum with Mari Tere.
- Beatriz Carvajal as Gregoria "Goya" Gutiérrez, Vicente's wife, Javi's mother. Died at the end of the fourth season.
- Gemma Cuervo as María Teresa "Mari Tere" Valverde, retired. She escaped an asylum with Izaskun.
- Guillermo Ortega as Joaquín Arias, younger brother of Sergio, former real estate agent.
- Sofía Nieto as Sandra Espinosa, assistant to Araceli in her hairdressing salon. In season 2 she works at the bar.
- Elio González as Eric Cortés, real estate agent.
- Isabel Ordaz as Araceli Madariaga, ex-wife of Enrique and mother of Fran, bisexual, former hairdresser that adopted a 'hippie' lifestyle.
- Fabio Arcidiácono as Fabio Sabatini, hairdresser.
- Roberto San Martín as Silvio Ramírez, Cristina's gay flatmate.
- Emma Penella as Rosario "Charo" de la Vega, Araceli's mother.
- Malena Alterio as Cristina Aguilera, a soon-to-be-married woman who is dumped days before the wedding.
- Manuel Andrés as Julián Pastor, Enrique's father.
- Víctor Palmero as Alba Recio (born Álvaro Recio). He was the gay son of Berta and Antonio in the first three season. In season 8, she makes a comeback to her home, now as a transgender girl named Alba that wants to pursue a baking career.
- Cristina Medina as Angelines "Nines" Chacón, cousin of Raquel, mother to Toñín, bar staff.
- Mónica Pérez as Blanca Neruda, Raquel and Nines's flatmate.
- Cristina Castaño as Judith Becker, ex-wife of Enrique, psychologist.
- Antonia San Juan as Estela Reynolds, wife of Fermín, mother of Lola. C list actress who still believes she is a superstar.
- Paz Padilla as María Jesús "Chusa", she was a homeless prostitute, but won the lottery and now works as Maité's maid.
- María Casal as Reyes Ballesteros, Araceli's ex-partner.
- Amparo Valle as Justiniana "Justi" Latorre, Amador and Teodoro's mother. She moves from her little provincial town to Montepinar for a while to try to get Amador and Maite back together.
- Ernesto Sevilla as Teodoro Rivas, he is the brother of Amador, he fakes a physical impairment. He is a DJ.
- William Miller as Hector. He is an artist and the love interest of Maité.
- Ricardo Nkosi as Ongombo, an African male that dates Berta while she volunteers at his country. He moves to Spain and ends up working as the janitor.
- Jaime Riba as Giorgi, a gay man living with Karma and Andy in a rented apartment at Contubernio 49.
- Álex Delacroix as Karma, an Instagrammer living with Giorgi and Andy in a rented apartment at Contubernio 49.

==== Former recurring characters ====
- Pep Guinyol as José Luis San Cristóbal, chief of the building of Mirador de Montepinar. (Season 1; guest 8)
- Cook as Camilo, Silvio's dog. (Season 1)
- Natalia Hernandez as Patu, Maité's close friend. (Season 2; guest 1, 3, 12)
- Carlos Alcalde as Rosario Parrales, Recio's undocumented employer. (Seasons 4–6)
- Marc Parejo as José Luis Sanz, banker (Seasons 6–8)
- Silvia Abril as Violeta Recio, the crazy sister of Antonio. (Seasons 6–7; guest 2, 5)
- Esther Soto as Raluka. A Romanian prostitute that dated Fermín. (Seasons 6–7, 9–14)
- Romeo Serrano as Dylan Bécker, the son of Judith and Enrique. He was born in Chicago and Judith decided to give him her surname. (Seasons 7–9)
- Jimmy Shaw as Matthew, the American brother-in-law of Judith. (Season 7; guest 4, 6)
- Alex Hafner as Trevor Simons, Judith's former boyfriend (Recurring 7; guest 8–9)
- Aitana Villacieros as Ursula Maroto Trujillo, the daughter of Javi and Lola. (Seasons 7–12)
- Xavier Deltell as José Ignacio Rovira, a clumsy lawyer (Season 7; guest 8, 10–12)
- Verónica Forqué as Mª Teresa Sáenz de Tejada, the former mayoress and Enrique's love interest. (Season 8)
- Silvia Alonso as Patricia, a social worker dealing with Amador and Maité. (Season 8)
- Jesús Olmedo as Diego Palomares, Fina's son and Raquel's ex-boyfriend. (Seasons 8–11)
- Tomás Pozzi as Cecilio, therapist. (Season 8; guest 7, 10)
- Nacho Embid as Esdrújula, Alba's drag friend. (Seasons 9–10; guest 11)
- Kika Lorace as Superlativa, Alba's drag friend. (Seasons 9–10; guest 11)
- Fernando Conde as Fidel, Menchu's husband and Yoli's dad. (Season 9; guest 12)
- Miguel Rellán as Cristobal, a corrupt politician who wants to control Enrique. (Season 9)
- María Molins as Sandra, the press head of Enrique during his time as the mayor. (Season 9)
- Max Marieges as Minguito, village idiot from Villazarcillo, Amador's hometown. (Season 10; guest 9, 12)
- Bárbara Grandio as Sonia, school's headmistress and Agustin's girlfriend (Seasons 10–12)
- Pepa Rus as Clara, Yoli's weird cousin. (Seasons 10–12)
- Kira Miró as Rosana, a hooker that Antonio Recio falls in love with. (Seasons 11–12)
- Norma Ruíz as Bárbara, a schoolteacher that dates Amador. (Seasons 11–12)
- María Hervás as Martina, a woman that's in a triple with Javi and Lola. Javi got her pregnant and escaped with her. (Season 11)
- Miguel de Miguel as Adrián, a gigolo married to Rosana. (Season 12; guest 4)

== Season ==
=== Season 1 (2007) ===
Starts with the arrival of the new residents into the new block of flats, Mirador de Montepinar. On the top floor, there are two flats, A and B: In flat A live the brothers Sergio and Joaquín Arias. Sergio is an actor by trade and a playboy by nature, while Joaquín is an unlucky-in-love estate agent, constantly battling to keep his job and sell the show flat on the ground floor. In Flat B live Javi Maroto, president of the community, and his wife Lola Trujillo. As president, Javi is often inundated with petty complaints from the residents, who include his parents, Vicente Maroto and Gregoria Gutiérrez, who live below him in apartment 2B. They share a floor with Amador Rivas, Maité Figueroa Espinosa and their three children (apartment 2A); and Germán Palomares, a defaulter whose identity is completely unknown. In flat 1A live Cristina Aguilera, a woman whose wedding was recently called off by her fiancé, who ran off with another woman, and Silvio Ramírez, a gay man from Cuba who often poses as her boyfriend, and even as her fiancé in the final episode. In flat 1B lives Leo Romaní, vice-president of the community who has an on-off relationship with Cristina. In flat 1C live Antonio Recio, a seafood wholesaler, and his wife Berta Escobar. On the ground floor below there are four spaces: flat A is the building's show flat, which is occupied by Izaskun Sagastume and Mari Tere Valverde, a couple of elderly friends who become squatters in the flat and stay using mischievous, and often legally doubtful, means, but end up purchasing the flat for a token sum of 1 euro. In flat B reside Enrique Pastor, a civil servant, his wife Araceli, her mother Rosario (Charo), and his teenage son Francisco (Fran). They are joined later in the series by Julián, Enrique's father. The two other spaces on the ground floor are occupied by a hairdresser's shop, owned by Araceli and staffed by Fabio Sabatani, a gay Argentine and friend of Silvio, and Sandra Espinosa, a young insecure hairdresser; and the estate agents' office where Joaquín works alongside Eric Cortés and their boss Raquel Villanueva. Other recurring characters are Máximo Ángulo (Maxi), the community's doorman and husband (separated) of Izaskun, and Coque Calatrava, the ex-convict gardener.

=== Season 2 (2008) ===
Most of the main characters from season one stay for the second season, although notable departures are Cristina, who left for unknown reasons, Rosario (Charo), whose character left due to the death of the actress playing the part, Emma Penella, and Araceli, who left her husband Enrique, who has to look after Fran all by himself. Eric moves into Sergio and Joaquín's apartment, while Raquel, her cousin Nines, and her friend Blanca, all single ladies looking to start a new stage of their lives, move into Cristina and Silvio's old flat after Silvio is evicted. Nines takes on work as a maid in various flats in the building, and in one episode is about to marry Leo before he leaves her at the altar after claiming he is in love with Raquel. A structural change is that the old hairdresser's shop on the ground floor is converted into a bar, called Max & Henry's and run by Maxi and Enrique. In this season, Maxi is come to be seen as a trusted part of the community, being called to for help by many different members of the community. After Javi leaves the post of president in the beginning of the series, Amador takes over the role with Leo remaining as his vice-president. Amador's wife Maite takes the role of "First Lady" seriously, and becomes obsessed with her image, splashing out on luxury items in order to look good despite her own family's crippling financial troubles. In addition to these problems, Amador finds out about his wife's previous infidelity with Sergio, which ultimately leads to their faltering marriage, and in turn leads to him being overthrown as president. Antonio takes over the role of president, with his nemesis Enrique drafted in as his second in command, imposing strict regimes but taking swift, often extreme and legally-dubious decisions.

=== Season 3 (2009) ===
This season sees the introduction of several new characters in Mirador de Montepinar. Judith Bécker, an attractive and successful psychologist, moves into the Attic A flat. She becomes part of the circle of friends of the younger group of women (Raquel, Nines and Lola) in the building, who develop a somewhat fractious relationship with the other, older group of women in the building; and other residents come to Judith for therapy. Another new arrival is Lola's mother, Estela Reynolds, who comes to live with her daughter and son-in-law. Estela is a former actress and her extremely dramatic, loud, crafty, and lustful nature causes plenty of stress both in Javi and Lola's home as well as in the rest of the building. Another new arrival is Antonio and Nines' baby Toñín, who arrives into the world via artificial insemination and a complicated web of blackmail, deceit and lies. Coque, now moonlighting as the doorman after replacing Maxi, starts the series as something of a henchman for the power-mad Antonio before running away with the latter's wife Berta, who after feeling neglected by her husband has an affair with him. Antonio is unaware of this affair as he is too busy in his role as President of the Community, obsessing over tracking down the defaulter Germán Palomares. This obsession gets him and his community into an array of predicaments. Enrique starts the season as Antonio's ally, all the while dreaming of the presidency for himself, which Antonio keeps on promising him, without actually handing it over. Amador, meanwhile, is left without a job after being replaced by a pot plant in his bank, and without money, love and a home as his marriage with Maite remains on the rocks.

=== Season 4 (2010) ===
The fourth season starts with a summary of the previous four months, in which Enrique was kidnapped by Germán Palomares, and Coque and Berta lived together in the countryside farming goats. All characters return to Montepinar, and the star-crossed lovers continue their affair. Berta's husband, Antonio, eventually finds out about her affair with Coque when they confess, after months of his investigating and suspecting several other neighbours. At one time he is convinced that Enrique is Berta's lover, and as a result he hires a hitman to kill him, although the hitman ultimately fails. Needless to say, this adds even more tension to the already-frosty relationship between the president and the politician. Enrique starts therapy sessions with Judith in order to get over his memories of the kidnapping and to have someone who listens to him, and the two start a relationship and he proposes to her but she turns him down. Meanwhile, Amador is ordered by the court to pay Maite alimony, and gets a job as a street cleaner, as well as other short-lived jobs, to pay her off and to follow his dream of buying a "pussy magnet" motorbike. Raquel and Judith, meanwhile, spend a lot of the season trying to get Maite, who constantly annoys them, out of their group of friends. Estela continues to stir up trouble, and after a brief affair with Leo and others, is eventually kicked out of the house by her own daughter, Lola. A new character, Rosario Parrales, is introduced in this season. He is an illegal immigrant from South America who agrees to pay Amador, who mistook him for a woman when they met on the internet, €6000 in exchange for his hand in marriage. The sham is easily discovered by the authorities, and the marriage licence is not granted. Later in the season Rosario is hired to work for Mariscos Recio, and ends the season acting as the president of the community after Antonio is overthrown. In the final episode of the season, Goya is found dead in the kitchen while cooking croquettes, Berta leaves to join a convent, and Antonio, Coque, and Enrique (going under the name "The A Team") set off on a caravan trip around Spain together.

=== Season 5 (2011) ===
The season starts after Enrique gets a call from Judith begging him to return. He comes back from his caravan trip with Antonio and Coque to discover that the community is in ruins, with no light and no working lift. Judith, now acting as president, calls on Enrique, her on-off partner, to be her vice-president and get Mirador de Montepinar out of its crisis. She comes to face plenty more crises, most of which are generated by Antonio in his attempt to undermine the presidency. In the other basement flat across the corridor from Enrique, Amador's overbearing mother, Justi, moves into the flat with him and goes to a lot of trouble to get her son's life and marriage back together, while Amador himself tries hard to get rid of her so he can pursue his life as a playboy. Amador now shares joint custody of the children with Maite, who moves into the flat above him to live with Raquel and Nines. Lola, meanwhile, leaves for Miami to shoot a series, leaving Javi to live with his recently bereaved father. Javi feels jealous and lonely and has to wrestle with his fidelity after Raquel, Judith and Berta all take a liking to him. A new resident is Reyes Ballesteros, who moves into 2ºB with her lover, Araceli, who has returned to the community to spend more time with Fran. Her new-found sexuality, mixed with her old feelings with Enrique (they are now still married, but separated), her battle for her son, her absent-mindedness, the homophobic views of some in the community, and her ongoing therapy sessions with Judith, make it difficult for them all to get along. The result is Judith and Enrique's marriage. Parrales, in the meantime, has expanded Mariscos Recio and a new fishmonger's is set up in the commercial area by the flat. Maxi continues being the mastermind of various schemes, and his relationship with his girlfriend, Ana Rosa, a blow-up doll, could be said to be blossoming.

=== Season 6 (2012–13) ===
The season begins with the end of Judith's presidency. After a failed round of voting, the occupant of ground floor flat B is randomly selected to succeed Judith. As a result, Araceli, joint owner of the flat with Enrique, takes the helm. Antonio still wants the presidency for himself, and his various attempts to undermine Araceli, including clogging the pipes of the building, are all unsuccessful. Lola is still angry with Raquel due to her supposed infidelity with her husband, Javi and during the first nine episodes the two do not speak amicably to each other. Javier tries to reconcile with Lola, which he eventually manages to do after the two end up having sex again. A few episodes later, they find out that she is pregnant. In order to fix his marriage, Javi calls on Lola's father, Fermín Trujillo, who she has never met. Estela Reynolds, Lola's mother, returns to the series and lives under the same roof as Javi, Lola and Fermín. Amador is still trying to get back with Maite, but that hits a snag when she is arrested and spends a brief time in prison for dealing drugs. To make things worse, she must face another problem: she and her husband will be evicted if they are unable to pay off the €16,800 debt they owe. Naturally, they try to scrape together the money and Amador eventually does so. The bad news for them is that the money arrives a few minutes too late, and his house is put up for auction as a result. He and his family are forced to move out of the downstairs flat, and go back to live in flat 2A where they previously lived. Sergio is another returner to the community; he comes back after having invested all his savings in shady deals and wants to fight for the paternity of his son with Maite, Amador Jr. (nicknamed "Chicken Eyes"). Antonio, in the meantime, finds out that he has a long-lost mother. He tries to track her down during the last episodes, and it turns out she was a nun. Violet, his sister, recently released from the mental hospital, comes to live with him and his wife, and is given work in his fishmonger's.

=== Season 7 (2013–14) ===
The outgoing president, Araceli, is replaced by her ex-husband, Enrique, who has just returned from Brazil after splitting up with his wife, Judith. Antonio becomes his second-in-command. Judith gives birth to their son Dylan in Chicago, but returns in the middle of the season. Enrique is in the dark about the existence of his son for a long time, but eventually finds out after randomly bumping into his pram in an Airport at Chicago. This event eventually leads to him being deported back to Spain as a suspected terrorist, and he is soon followed there by Judith and their son, who are refused re-entry into the States due to Enrique's criminal record. Meanwhile, there is another new baby in the community, as Lola gives birth to Javi's daughter, but they are unable to come up with a suitable name for a long time until they eventually choose Úrsula. Lola suffers from great depression, loses her job in her television series, and has to keep on putting up with her parents, Estela and Fermín, who are back in love and marry. They temporarily move out of Lola's marital home into the ground-floor flat, whose mortgage is being paid for by Javi and Lola. Antonio and Berta also have new marital problems: the long-suffering Berta finally tries to get a divorce from Antonio, with the help of Rebeca Ortiz, a lawyer friend of Judith who looks after her flat while she is in Chicago. Antonio is aware that Berta is entitled to half of all his assets, as she has been financially dependent on him throughout their marriage. To prevent Berta from getting her hands on his fortune, he gives away his assets and tries to manipulate her into settling for less than she is entitled to. First he gives the flat he is leasing to Nines, the mother of his youngest son, and then he gives his seafood company away to his clinically insane sister Violeta. Berta moves in temporarily with Araceli, and the two have a short-lived lesbian affair. Amador and Maite continue to have financial woes, losing the flat they were squatting in (2ºA) after it is reclaimed by Edurne, the daughter of recently deceased Izaskun. They are left with no choice but to move into a makeshift house in the garage, shoddily built by them with the help of a few of their neighbours, and their gloom continues. Their children move in too. In addition, Nines and Coque have an affair, Nines gets a job at Max & Henry's, Fermín and Estela get their own reality TV series, Antonio and Matthew (an over-sensitive American who is splitting up from Ingrid, Judith's sister) move into Enrique's flat to form the "Happy Singles", Rebeca has to deal with her socially inept gynaecologist ex-husband Santiago, and Vicente starts an affair with Penélope, only to find out she is a mass murderer.

=== Season 8 (2014–15) ===
Amador decides to return to civilization after six months in the forest, and will be helped by La Chusa (character who had left in a couple of episodes), a junkie from the slums. Maite leaves jail and will have to wear a bracelet on her ankle which controls her movements and makes her unable to leave the 1ºA, which is where she lives with Raquel, Toñín, Nines and Coque, who lives there because he is dating Nines. Amador and La Chusa see Carlota, Nano, Rodrigo and Eyes of Chicken in a car. When they find the house of the owners of the car, they are taken away, but Maite and Rebeca inform her that they are her foster family. Amador leaves La Chusa and goes to live in Coque's caravan. Violeta has been admitted to an asylum again. Berta will insist on Antonio asking her for marriage, but this will have problems with Fina, a very problematic old woman who moves to 2 °C who will not stop making life impossible for her neighbors and who, mysteriously, knows everything that has happened in Montepinar. Estela has left Fermín for a Russian and Fermín will stay with Javi and Úrsula, the daughter of Javi and Lola, trying to sell the Bajo A. Amador and Maite will try to get work and home to recover their children while Amador tries to conquer Patricia, the social worker who takes the case, without success. Enrique will be the right hand of Maria Teresa, the new mayor, who goes to live with him since her husband, the minister, has cheated on her. However, for the good of the party, Maria Teresa and her husband get back together. Berta gets Antonio to propose and starts organizing the wedding, something that Antonio is not thrilled about. Judith falls in love with Javi but Lola returns to Spain as she has managed to escape from the guerrillas. The bad thing is that Amador, Leo, Vicente, Javi and Fermín had gone to Colombia to rescue her, but they manage to return. Javi will be very angry with Lola. Maria Teresa returns with Enrique and they begin a relationship. La Chusa win the Christmas lottery and rents the Bajo A before beginning a relationship with Fermín. Maite writes an erotic novel based on the romances of Mirador de Montepinar. Berta goes to a spa at her bachelorette party with the girls in the building and she meets Araceli there, with whom she is about to have intercourse when the owner of the spa (Araceli's girlfriend) sees them. Araceli ends up breaking up with her and is left without a house, going to the Bajo B, and later makes Enrique and Teresa break up. Judith tries to return with Trevor but he already expects a son with another girl. Rebeca throws her out of the house and she goes with Dylan to live with Enrique. La Chusa and Fermín break up and she refuses to leave, even though she does not pay rent. Raquel falls in love with Diego, Fina's son, but Fina intervenes and gets Diego to think that she is crazy. Antonio learns his son is now a transgender who happens to call itself Alba instead of Álvaro. Alba starts dating Leo, while Antonio and Berta marry. Maite publishes her book and is reconciled with Amador, and the two buy together the Bajo A, where La Chusa the okupa is. Enrique, fed up with Judith, Araceli and Teresa treating him badly, leaves them with a note.

=== Season 9 (2016) ===
Vicente is named the new president of Mirador de Montepinar. His consort, Fermín, moves with him to 2ºB to help him with the mandate since Vicente is not excited. However, the premiership of these two will be full of ups and downs. Enrique returns to the community because his party has named him mayor after the departure of María Teresa. Enrique will have to learn from Cristóbal, a corrupt politician. After starring eight seasons, Leo dies when the parachute is not opened in a gift from Alba. Alba overcomes her depression with Teodoro, Amador's brother, whom she marries with. Teodoro refloats his father-in-law Antonio's fishmonger, but his friendship is not earned. Alba will save money to do the sex change operation and then will have to wait to be able to "consummate" which is what Theodore is waiting impatiently. After the departure of Rebeca, Judith will not stop giving emotional thrombi. Her flings will include a trainer obsessed with the sport, a homosexual Catholic, a patient with an imaginary friend, and Trevor, a millionaire friend of Javi. At the end of the season she goes to Ibiza, where she falls in love and leaves the series. Maite is again successful with money. With La Chusa as a maid, Maite pays Amador a salary to keep custody of her four children, some spoiled. She starts a relationship with Hector, a hipster. Amador rents the 2ºA with Teodoro. Then he meets Yolanda "Yoli", a seamstress with a safe and problematic character. Yoli will bring her mother, Menchu, noisy and like her daughter, causing several problems, such as: causing Teodoro and Alba to leave the 2°A and live with Antonio and Berta, not accept that Amador leaves her and try to have children with him, renting Enrique the Bajo B after the departure of Araceli and settling in Attic A with her mother at the end of the season. Besides, they emphasize their fights with Maite and Alba... The relationship between Nines and Coque will go through problems. Fermin tries to conquer Araceli until she leaves. Fina takes it with Javi and Lola, who are still fighting for their love despite their debts. Bruno is a pianist who has just been abandoned by his wife. He becomes a patient of Judith and needs her help so much that he moves to the 1°B, formerly property of Leo. Seeing the world of lies and corruption in which he is submerged, Enrique resigns and tries to found his own party.

The building undergoes gradual repairs, requiring works to be performed. During this period, the residents temporarily relocate to various places, including a hotel, a makeshift campsite, Villazarcillo (the village of Justi, the deceased mother of Amador and Teodoro), and Bruno's former house. Upon completion, the building includes some additional new features.

At the end of the season Amador asks for a divorce to take half of what he has, so Maite hires a hit man. Theodore breaks up with Alba because he did not like it when they had sex. The hit man shoots Amador but he covers himself with Theodore without knowing if he lives or dies. Diego, the son of Fina, returns. Diego sees at last how his mother really is and it seems that he is going to send her to a nursing home. Besides, he begins a relationship with Raquel, which it seems that he is leaving for going to China. It is not known if Theodore lives or if Raquel and Fina have left.

=== Season 10 (2017–18) ===
Fina escapes from the nursing home where she was interned and returns to live at 2 °C. Berta and Antonio are still married but the latter wants them to live separately and goes to live with Enrique, leaving Berta living at 1 °C along with her daughter Alba, who is now single because she has broken up with Teodoro. Both will have to carry with difficulty the business of Mariscos Recio, before the passivity of its owner to 50%, Antonio. Alba will be attracted to Enrique throughout the season and they will have several encounters behind Antonio's back. After the departure of Judith, Yoli and Menchu are the ones who buy Attic A, and they will cause multiple problems in the building. Fermín, who continues his relationship with Menchu, will live with them. In addition, he will continue to serve as "Richelieu" of the new president, Bruno Quiroga. The latter will try to maintain an asexual relationship with Maite, who will also have meetings with Hector, who has returned to Montepinar. Coque ends his relationship with Nines and takes vacations, leaving the community with the vacant janitor plaza. In addition, he goes to live with Enrique and Antonio at Bajo B. The latter recover the bar from the catastrophic rental contract that Enrique maintained with Fermín Trujillo, baptizing him as Tony and Henry. Nines leaves her job and instead it will be Alba who at first helps her father in the business. Theodore and Amador are again the only tenants of the second. The latter will try to recover Yoli's love, although she passes from him; Meanwhile, he will pretend to be Fina's caregiver in front of Diego, his son, in exchange for a salary and with the objective that Diego stays calm and stops visiting his mother so much. Diego will begin a relationship with Raquel and will take her to China although eventually she returns. Maite will have to share her assistant La Chusa with Bruno, who also hires her as she gets pregnant with his baby through artificial insemination. During Coque's vacation period, Fermín hires Clara as her fellow, who is Menchu's niece and whom she recommends to minimize an important expense such as the janitor's salary.

== International remakes ==
=== Greece – Θα γίνει της Πολυκατοικίας ===
A Greek adaptation premiered on Skai TV in September 2019, with Greek actors.
