= Alberto Caballero =

Spanish television director

- Born: Alberto Rodríguez Caballero; 21 August 1973 (age 53); Madrid, Spain
- Occupations: TV director, screenwriter and producer
- Spouse: María Adánez (m. 2003–2005) Vanesa Romero (m. 2006–2012) Miren Ibarguren (m. 2013)
- Relatives: José Luis Moreno; Laura Caballero

Alberto Rodríguez Caballero (21 August 1973) is a Spanish TV director, screenwriter and producer.

== Career ==
He is known as the creator of Aquí no hay quien viva (2003–2006) and his successor La que se avecina (2007–). His sister is Laura Caballero, with whom he directs and produces the series.

From 2003 he adapted the dialogues in Aquí no hay quien viva. From 2009, when Telecinco adapted it version, he became the executive producer with Esther Jiménez, and Daniel Deorador and Sergio Mitjans as the screenwriters.

== Personal life ==
In September 2012 he married actress Vanesa Romero, with whom he met in the last season of Aquí no hay quien viva. They had a crisis because in April 2013, María Adánez (his last spouse) was cast in the series. In October 2013 they broke up and Vanesa left the series during some episodes.

Since 2013 he maintains a relationship with the actress Miren Ibarguren known for representing Soraya in the Aída series and subsequently to Yolanda in which he is coming. In February 2022 he became public that he is going to be the father of his first son. The baby was born on July 17, 2022.

== Awards and nominationes ==
In 2005, he was nominated to Premios ATV for Best Direction in Aquí no hay quien viva.
