= List of Spanish films of 1973 =

A list of films produced in Spain in 1973 (see 1973 in film).

== 1973 ==
Title	Director	Cast	Genre	Notes
1973
Anna and the Wolves	Carlos Saura			Entered into the 1973 Cannes Film Festival
The Girl from the Red Cabaret	Eugenio Martín	Marisol, Renaud Verley, Mel Ferrer	Musical	
Habla, mudita	Manuel Gutiérrez Aragón			Entered into the 23rd Berlin International Film Festival
La otra imagen	Antoni Ribas			Entered into the 1973 Cannes Film Festival
Queridísmos verdugos	Basilio Martín Patino		Documentary	Banned for years; about Capital punishment
Return of the Blind Dead			Horror	
The Spirit of the Beehive	Victor Erice	Fernando Fernán Gómez, Teresa Gimpera, Ana Torrent, Isabel Tellería	Drama	San Sebastian Film Festival winner
Lo verde empieza en los Pirineos	Vicente Escribá	José Sacristán, José Luis López Vázquez, Nadiuska	Comedy	Spaniard went to south of France to watch banned films such as Last Tango in Paris
