= Violeta la Burra =

Spanish singer, dancer, drag performer (1936–2020)

- Born: Pedro Moreno Moreno; 1936; Herrera, Seville, Andalusia, Spain
- Died: January 29, 2020 (aged 84); Herrera, Seville, Andalusia, Spain
- Burial place: Herrera, Seville, Andalusia, Spain
- Occupations: Singer, dancer, drag performer

Violeta la Burra (1936 – January 29, 2020) was a Spanish copla, flamenco, cabaret singer, as well as a drag performer of Andalusian origin.

== Biography ==
She was born in the Sevillian town of Herrera as Pedro Moreno Moreno, but she developed most of her career in Barcelona, where she performed for more than 40 years and achieved wide recognition as a transformist and performer.

=== Early career ===
She started her career in the world of entertainment in flamenco clubs on the Rambla de Barcelona such as Barcelona de Noche, where she shared a poster with artists such as Antonio Machín and Estrellita Castro and was linked to Salvador Dalí and Lola Flores. She stayed in Belgium before returning to Barcelona. In the mid-1970s she began to perform in the Whisky Twist room as Violeta la Burra, with shows closer to cabaret and with comedic elements, which earned her great popularity. In 1977, she recorded the first album by a transvestite person in Spain, Violeta La Burra, published by Satosa/Sonitec. During this time, she suffered under the repression of the Francoist police, who arrested her thirty times.

=== Later career ===
In the late 1970s, businessman Jean Marie Rivière hired her to work at the Paradis Latin alongside Miquel Massana and Solans in Paris, considered at that time the "mecca of European drag", where she played Bizet's Carmen and was the main performer for two years. During this time, she also had her own show in the Moulin Rouge. After her mother became sick, she returned to Spain to take care of her.

Upon her return to Spain, she continued to work in Barcelona, enjoying wide popularity. In 1980, she performed at the La Mercè festival. The following year she premiered the show Burla... burlando in the Ciro's room, and in 1982 she was the main performer at the reopening of the Arnau Theater. At this stage she was also photographed by Humberto Rivas, and was featured in some works from the IVAM collection, as well as featured in a column by Francisco Umbral.

=== Later years and death ===
In 2012, she received the FAD Sebastià Gasch Award for paratheatrical arts in recognition of her career. She died in 2020 at the age of 84 and was buried in her hometown.

== Discography ==
=== Studio albums ===
- Violeta La Burra (1977).
- Violeta La Burra (con Orquesta Los Nabos) (1978).
- Violeta La Burra (1992).
- Violeta "la Burra" (1993).
- Cabeza Loca (1995).
- La Criada (1997).
- Lo mejor del milenio (1999).
- Los Amigos de Violeta La Burra (2002).
- Más Cañera Que Nunca (2006).
- 2012, Mejor Que Nunca (2012).
- Violeta (2014).

=== Compilations ===
- Las Noches Locas de Violeta La Burra, Sus Grandes Éxitos (2000).
- Medio Siglo de Historia (2012).
- Medio Siglo de Historia. Grandes Éxitos Vol. 2 (2012).

== Filmography ==
=== Feature films ===
- Cambio de sexo (Vicente Aranda, 1977).
- Victòria! La gran aventura de un pueblo (Antoni Ribas, 1983).
- El gran Vázquez (Óscar Aibar, 2010).

=== Television programs ===
- El pèndol (1997).
- Jo què sé! (Carles Flavià, 2010).
