= Concha Velasco =

Spanish actress, singer, dancer, and television presenter (1939–2023)

The Most Excellent Concha Velasco
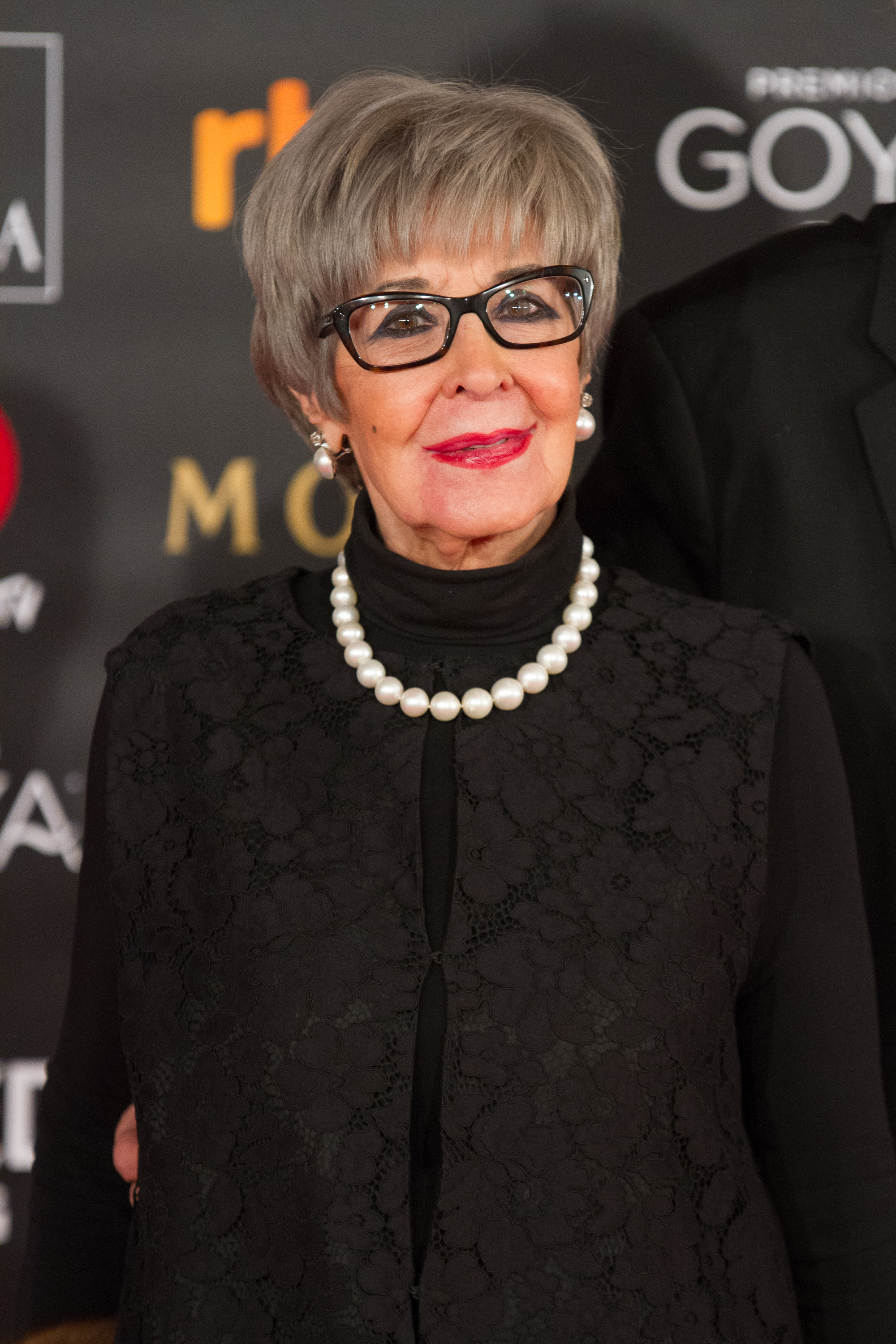
- Velasco at the 32nd Goya Awards in 2018
- Born: Concepción Velasco Varona; 29 November 1939; Valladolid, Spain
- Died: 2 December 2023 (aged 84); Majadahonda, Spain
- Other name: Conchita Velasco
- Spouse: Paco Marsó (m. 1977; div. 2005)
- Children: 2
- Relatives: Manuela Velasco (niece)

Concepción Velasco Varona (29 November 1939 – 2 December 2023), known professionally as Concha Velasco, also Conchita Velasco, was a Spanish actress, singer, dancer, television presenter, and theatrical producer. She received numerous accolades throughout her career in film, theater, and television spanning over six decades, including two National Theater Awards presented by the Spanish Ministry of Culture in 1972 and 2016, the Lifetime Achievement Award presented by the Spanish Television Academy in 2009, and the Honorary Goya Award presented by the Spanish Film Academy in 2012.

Some of her credits include leading film performances in Red Cross Girls (1958), Los tramposos (1959), The Fair of the Dove (1963), Television Stories (1965), The Witching Hour (1985), and Beyond the Garden (1996); leading stage performances in ¡Mamá, quiero ser artista!, in several plays that author Antonio Gala wrote for her, and in the Spanish productions of Filumena Marturano and Hello, Dolly!; leading television performances in Teresa de Jesús and Herederos on Televisión Española, Motivos personales on Telecinco, and Gran Hotel on Antena 3; as well as a television presenter in numerous shows for those three networks.

Velasco had been also the recipient of many honours. The Government of Spain honoured her with the Gold Medal of Merit in the Fine Arts in 1987, the Gold Medal of Merit in Labour in 2008, the Grand Cross of the Civil Order of Alfonso X, the Wise in 2016, and the Grand Cross of the Royal Order of Isabella the Catholic posthumously in 2023. The Spanish Film Academy honoured her with its Gold Medal in 2003.

== Life and career ==
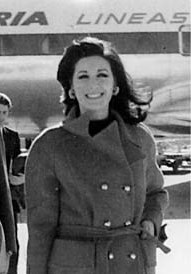
Concha Velasco (1962)

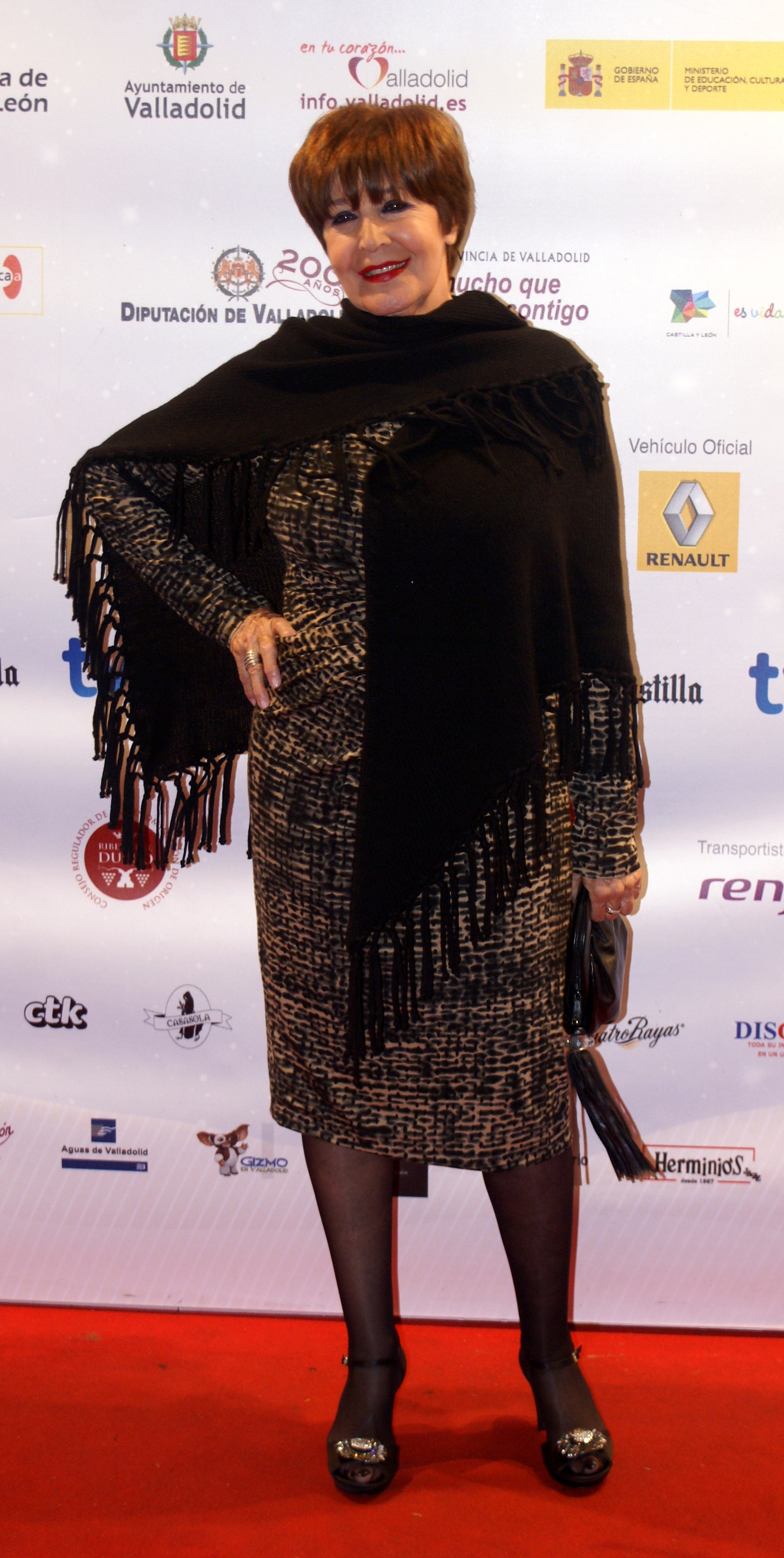
Concha Velasco (2013)

Concepción Velasco Varona was born in Valladolid on 29 November 1939. She was raised in Valladolid until she was six years old, when her family moved to Larache. At age ten, she moved to Madrid where she studied classical and Spanish dance at the National Conservatory. She made her debut as a dancer in the corps de ballet of the La Coruña opera and later worked as a flamenco dancer with Manolo Caracol and as revue dancer with Celia Gámez.

Velasco began her career in the cinema at the age of fifteen in several titles as a supporting actress. Her first film as a leading actress was Red Cross Girls (1958). During the 1960s and 1970s she combined her work starring in films and in plays for theater and television. In the film Television Stories (1965) she performed the song "Chica ye ye" composed by Augusto Algueró with lyrics by Antonio Guijarro. The song became a hit and she suddenly found success as a yé-yé singer recording eight albums.

After an early career with a filmography in line with the tenets of Francoism and close to the regime's favoured filmmaker José Luis Sáenz de Heredia, she eventually developed left-wing views and was reportedly vetoed for her trade union activity. At age 80, she described herself as "Catholic, Socialist, and Spanish".

During the 1970s and 1980s she performed more serious roles. Her most successful role for television was in Teresa de Jesús (1984) as Teresa of Ávila. Also in the 1980s she launched her career as television presenter hosting the New Year's Eve variety shows to welcome 1985, 1986, and 1987 on Televisión Española, where she also sings and dances. She hosted on Antena 3 the broadcast of the New Year's Eve clock bell strikes live from Puerta del Sol in Madrid to welcome 1998 –along with Constantino Romero–.

In theater, she had her own theatrical troupe first, and a production company with her husband Paco Marsó later, producing many of the plays she starred in herself, which led her to bankruptcy and to have debts with the Tax Agency on several occasions. On 14 March 2018 she announced that, after a career of 64 years, the stage play El funeral would be her last. She retired on 21 September 2021 with her last performance of the play La habitación de María at Theatre of Bretón de los Herreros in Logroño.

On 28 May 2010 she revealed she was battling lymphatic cancer which was discovered in April. She got back to her activities months after. She died at the Hospital Puerta de Hierro in Majadahonda (Madrid) on 2 December 2023, at the age of 84. She lay in repose at La Latina theater in Madrid for public wake. The following day her mortal remains were taken to Valladolid where she was honored in front of Teatro Calderón, and people paid tribute to her, as the funeral procession passed by. Her funeral took place in the Cathedral and she was buried in the Pantheon of Illustrious Vallisoletans at El Carmen cemetery.

== Filmography and performances ==
=== Film ===
- 1954: El bandido generoso
- 1955: The Moorish Queen as Bailaora
- 1956: La fierecilla domada
- 1956: Dos novias para un torero
- 1956: Los maridos no cenan en casa
- 1957: Mensajeros de paz
- 1958: Muchachas en vacaciones
- 1958: Red Cross Girls as Paloma
- 1959: El día de los enamorados as Conchita
- 1959: Los tramposos as Julita
- 1959: Crimen para recién casados
- 1959: Vida sin risas
- 1960: Amor bajo cero
- 1960: Julia y el celacanto
- 1960: Peace Never Comes as Paula
- 1961: The Reprieve as Antonia
- 1961: Trampa para Catalina
- 1961: Martes y trece
- 1961: My Wedding Night as Fernanda Jiménez
- 1961: Festival en Benidorm as Lía / María / Estefanía
- 1962: Sabían demasiado
- 1963: La boda era a las doce
- 1963: The Fair of the Dove as Susana / Mari Loli
- 1964: Casi un caballero
- 1965: Television Stories as Katy
- 1965: Susana
- 1965: La frontera de Dios
- 1966: El arte de no casarse
- 1966: Hoy como ayer
- 1966: El arte de casarse
- 1966: Honeymoon, Italian Style as Rosetta de Curtis
- 1967: Pero... ¿en qué país vivimos?
- 1967: Las Locas del conventillo as María
- 1967: Las que tienen que servir as Juana Cortés
- 1968: Una vez al año, ser hippy no hace daño
- 1968: Relaciones casi públicas as Marta
- 1968: Los que tocan el piano
- 1969: Cuatro noches de boda
- 1969: Matrimonios separados
- 1969: Juicio de faldas as Marta
- 1969: El taxi de los conflictos
- 1970: La decente as Nuria
- 1970: Después de los nueve meses
- 1970: En un lugar de la Manga
- 1970: El alma se serena
- 1971: Me debes un muerto
- 1971: Préstame quince días as Iris
- 1971: Los gallos de la madrugada
- 1971: En la red de mi canción
- 1972: The Lonely Woman as Africa
- 1972: Venta por pisos
- 1972: El vikingo
- 1973: El amor empieza a medianoche
- 1973: El Love Feroz o Cuando los hijos juegan al amor
- 1973: Las señoritas de mala compañía
- 1974: Torment as Rosalía de Bringas
- 1974: Mi mujer es muy decente, dentro de lo que cabe as Margarita
- 1975: Yo soy Fulana de Tal as Mapi Sánchez
- 1975: Pim, pam, pum... ¡fuego!
- 1975: Un lujo a su alcance
- 1975: Yo creo que...
- 1975: Las bodas de Blanca
- 1976: Long Vacations of 36 as Mercedes
- 1976: Libertad provisional
- 1977: Esposa y amante
- 1978: Jaque a la dama
- 1979: Cinco tenedores
- 1979: Ernesto as Aunt Regina
- 1982: The Beehive as Purita
- 1985: The Witching Hour as Pilar
- 1989: Esquilache as Pastora Patermo
- 1992: Yo me bajo en la próxima, ¿y usted? as Concha
- 1996: Beyond the Garden as Palmira Gadea
- 1999: París-Tombuctú
- 2000: Km. 0 as Marga
- 2001: Sólo yo sé tu nombre
- 2003: Moscow Gold as Pastora Bernal
- 2006: Welcome Home
- 2007: Boystown as Antonia
- 2007: Crazy as Nuria
- 2009: Rage as Sra. Torres
- 2014: Flow
- 2018: Mañana y siempre
- 2020: 32 Malasana Street

==== As herself ====
- 1996: Sombras y luces: Cien años de cine español
- 2009: Por la gracia de Luis

=== Stage ===
- 1959: Ven y ven... al Eslava
- 1961: Los derechos de la mujer, by Alfonso Paso (Note: Also producer)
- 1962: The Boy Friend, by Sandy Wilson
- 1962: Las que tienen que servir, by Alfonso Paso
- 1965: Elena, para los miércoles, by Muriel Resnik
- 1966: Don Juan Tenorio as doña Inés, by José Zorrilla
- 1966: El cumpleaños de la tortuga, by Pietro Garinei and Sandro Giovannini
- 1967: Una chica en mi sopa, by Terence Frisby
- 1969: El alma se serena, by Juan José Alonso Millán
- 1970: Llegada de los dioses as Verónica, by Antonio Buero Vallejo
- 1972: Abelardo y Eloísa, by Ronald Millar
- 1974: Las cítaras colgadas de los árboles as Olalla, by Antonio Gala
- 1977: Las arrecogías del beaterio de Santa María Egipciaca, by José Martín Recuerda
- 1979: Filomena Marturano as Filonema, by Eduardo De Filippo
- 1981: Yo me bajo en la próxima, ¿y usted?, by Adolfo Marsillach
- 1983: Mata-Hari, by Adolfo Marsillach
- 1985: Buenas noches, madre, by Marsha Norman
- 1986: ¡Mamá, quiero ser artista!, by Juan José de Arteche
- 1988: Carmen, Carmen as Carmen, by Antonio Gala
- 1992: La truhana, by Antonio Gala
- 1996: Nostalgia del Paraíso, by Antonio Gala
- 1997: La rosa tatuada, by Tennessee Williams
- 1999: Las manzanas del viernes as Orosia, by Antonio Gala
- 2001: Hello, Dolly! as Dolly, by Jerry Herman and Michael Stewart
- 2003: Inés desabrochada, by Antonio Gala
- 2006: Filomena Marturano as Filonema, by Eduardo De Filippo
- 2009: La vida por delante, by Romain Gary
- 2011: Concha, yo lo que quiero es bailar, by Juan Carlos Rubio
- 2012: Hélade
- 2013: Hécuba as Hecuba, by Euripides
- 2014: Olivia y Eugenio, by Herbert Morote
- 2016: Reina Juana as Juana, by Ernesto Caballero de las Heras
- 2018: El funeral, by Manuel Martínez Velasco
- 2019: Metamorphoses, by Mary Zimmerman
- 2020: La habitación de María, by Manuel Martínez Velasco

=== Television ===
Date	Title	Role	Network	Notes
1 December 1965	Estudio 1: La dama del alba		Televisión Española	Version of La dama del alba by Alejandro Casona for television
1966	Estudio 1: Don Juan Tenorio	Doña Inés	Televisión Española	Version of Don Juan Tenorio by José Zorrilla for television
29 January 1971	Estudio 1: La alondra		Televisión Española	Spanish version of L'Alouette by Jean Anouilh for television
2 April 1971	Estudio 1: Marea baja		Televisión Española	Spanish version of Miranda by Peter Blackmore for television
26 May 1972	Estudio 1: ¿Quiere usted jugar con mí?		Televisión Española	Spanish version of Voulez-vous jouer avec moâ ? by Marcel Achard for television
2 March 1973	Estudio 1: Una muchachita de Valladolid	Mercedes	Televisión Española	Version of Una muchachita de Valladolid by Joaquín Calvo Sotelo for television
11 May 1973	Estudio 1: Las brujas de Salem		Televisión Española	Spanish version of The Crucible by Arthur Miller for television
1984	Teresa de Jesús	Teresa of Ávila	Televisión Española	
1985	La comedia musical española	Patricia / Celinda	Televisión Española	
1996	Yo, una mujer	Elena Andrade	Antena 3	
1997	Mamá quiere ser artista	Leonor	Antena 3	
1998	Compañeros	Charo	Antena 3	
2005	Las cerezas del cementerio	Beatriz	Televisión Española	Adaptation of the novel of the same name by Gabriel Miró
2005	Motivos personales	Aurora Acosta	Telecinco	
2007–2009	Herederos	Carmen Orozco Argenta	Televisión Española	
2010	Las chicas de oro	Doroti	Televisión Española	Spanish version of The Golden Girls in the role of Dorothy Zbornak
2011–2013	Gran Hotel	Ángela Salinas	Antena 3	
2016	Bajo sospecha	Doña Adela Varcárcel	Antena 3	
2016	Velvet	Petra Alcalde Vargas	Antena 3	
2017–2020	Cable Girls	Doña Carmen Cifuentes	Netflix	

==== As herself ====
Date	Title	Role	Network	Notes
1972	14th Benidorm Song Festival	Host	Televisión Española	
1973	15th Benidorm Song Festival	Host	Televisión Española	
4–6 May 1978	4th Musical Mallorca	Co-host (Note: Along with José Luis Uribarri and Isabel Borondo)	Televisión Española	
1 January 1985 eve	¡Viva 85!	Co-host (Note: Along with Victoria Vera)	Televisión Española	
1 January 1986 eve	¡Viva 86!	Host	Televisión Española	
1 January 1987 eve	¡Viva 87!	Host	Televisión Española	
1990–1991	Viva el espectáculo	Host	Televisión Española	
1992	Querida Concha	Host	Telecinco	
1992	Queridos padres	Host	Telecinco	
1993–1994	Encantada de la vida	Host	Antena 3	
1 January 1998 eve	Campanadas	Co-host (Note: Along with Constantino Romero)	Antena 3	
1999	Sorpresa ¡Sorpresa!	Host	Antena 3	Spanish version of Surprise Surprise
3 February 2001	15th Goya Awards	Co-host (Note: Along with Pablo Carbonell, María Barranco, José Coronado, Loles León, and Imanol Arias)	Televisión Española	
2001–2002	Tiempo al tiempo	Host	Televisión Española	
29 January 2006	20th Goya Awards	Co-host (Note: Along with Antonio Resines)	Televisión Española	
2006	Mi abuelo es el mejor	Host	Televisión Española	
2011–2020	Cine de barrio	Host	Televisión Española	

== Accolades ==
=== Awards and nominations ===
Year	Award	Category	Work	Result	R.
1958	CEC Awards	Best Supporting Actress	Muchachas en vacaciones	Won	
1958	Syndicate of Spectacle Awards	Best Supporting Actress		Won	
1972	National Theater Prize		Abelardo y Eloísa	Won	
1974	Fotogramas de Plata	Best Performer in Spanish Cinema	Torment	Won	
1974	CEC Awards	Best Actress in a Leading Role	Torment	Won	
1974	TP de Oro	Best National Actress	Estudio 1	3rd Place	
1975	TP de Oro	Best National Actress	El Teatro	2nd Place	
1981	Fotogramas de Plata	Best Performer in Theater	Yo me bajo en la próxima, ¿y usted?	Won	
1984	Fotogramas de Plata	Best Performer in Television	Teresa de Jesús	Won	
1984	Antena de Oro	Best Performer	Teresa de Jesús	Won	
1984	TP de Oro	Best Actress	Teresa de Jesús	Won	
1985	Valladolid International Film Festival	Golden Spike for Best Actress	The Witching Hour	Won	
1985	TP de Oro	Best Actress	La comedia musical española	3rd Place	
1986	Fotogramas de Plata	Best Performer in Theater	¡Mamá, quiero ser artista!	Nominated	
1986	Valladolid International Film Festival	Spike of Honor		Won	
1986	TP de Oro	Best Actress	La comedia musical española	2nd Place	
1988	Fotogramas de Plata	Best Performer in Theater	Carmen, Carmen	Won	
1989	Goya Awards	Best Supporting Actress	Esquilache	Nominated	
1992	Fotogramas de Plata	Best Performer in Theater	La truhana	Won	
1993	Huesca International Film Festival	Lifetime Achievement in Film		Won	
1996	Goya Awards	Best Actress	Beyond the Garden	Nominated	
1996	Fotogramas de Plata	Best Actress in Cinema	Beyond the Garden	Nominated	
1996	CEC Awards	Best Actress	Beyond the Garden	Won	
1999	Premio Nacional de Teatro Pepe Isbert			Won	
2001	Fotogramas de Plata	Best Actress in Theater	Hello, Dolly!	Won	
2002	Premios Max	Best Musical	Hello, Dolly!	Won (Note: As producer)	
2004	Huelva Ibero-American Film Festival	Ciudad de Huelva Award		Won	
2007	TP de Oro	Lifetime Achievement		Won	
2007	Actors and Actresses Union Awards	Best Television Actress in a Leading Role	Herederos	Nominated	
2008	ATV Awards	Best Actress in a Television Series	Herederos	Nominated	
2008	Actors and Actresses Union Awards	Best Television Actress in a Leading Role	Herederos	Won	
2008	Málaga Film Festival	Málaga Award		Won	
2009	Fotogramas de Plata	Best Actress in Theater	La vida por delante	Won	
2009	Sant Jordi Awards	Lifetime Achievement RNE Special		Won	
2009	CEC Awards	Medal of Honor		Won	
2009	ATV Awards	Best Actress in a Television Series	Herederos	Won	
2009	ATV Awards	Lifetime Achievement		Won	
2010	Actors and Actresses Union Awards	Best Theater Actress in a Leading Role	La vida por delante	Nominated	
2010	Premios Valle-Inclán de Teatro	5th Premio Valle-Inclán	La vida por delante	Nominated	
2010	Premios Max	Best Actress in a Leading Role	La vida por delante	Nominated	
2011	Actors and Actresses Union Awards	Lifetime Achievement		Won	
2011	Fotogramas de Plata	Best Actress in Theater	Concha, yo lo que quiero es bailar	Nominated	
2012	Goya Awards	Honorary		Won	
2012	ATV Iris Awards	Best Actress in a Television Series	Gran Hotel	Won	
2012	Premios Ondas	Best Female Performer in a National Fiction	Gran Hotel	Won	
2012	Actors and Actresses Union Awards	Best Television Actress in a Secondary Role	Gran Hotel	Won	
2012	Fotogramas de Plata	Best Actress in Television	Gran Hotel	Nominated	
2013	Valladolid International Film Festival	Spike of Honor		Won	
2013	Fotogramas de Plata	Best Actress in Theater	Hécuba	Nominated	
2014	Fotogramas de Plata	Best Actress in Theater	Hécuba	Won	
2015	Premios Valle-Inclán de Teatro	9th Premio Valle-Inclán	Hécuba	Won	
2016	National Theater Prize			Won	
2016	Fotogramas de Plata	Best Actress in Theater	Reina Juana	Nominated	
2019	Premios Max	Honorary		Won	
2020	Fotogramas de Plata	Lifetime Achievement		Won	

=== Honours ===
- Gold Medal of Merit in the Fine Arts (30 December 1987)
- Gold Medal of the Academy of Cinematographic Arts and Sciences of Spain (4 April 2003)
- Gold Medal of Merit in Labour (5 December 2008)
- Grand Cross of the Civil Order of Alfonso X, the Wise (7 October 2016)
- Valladolid Gold Medal (City Council of Valladolid, 17 March 2018)
- Madrid Gold Medal (City Council of Madrid, 15 May 2018)
- Grand Cross of the Royal Order of Isabella the Catholic (5 December 2023; posthumous)

== Legacy ==
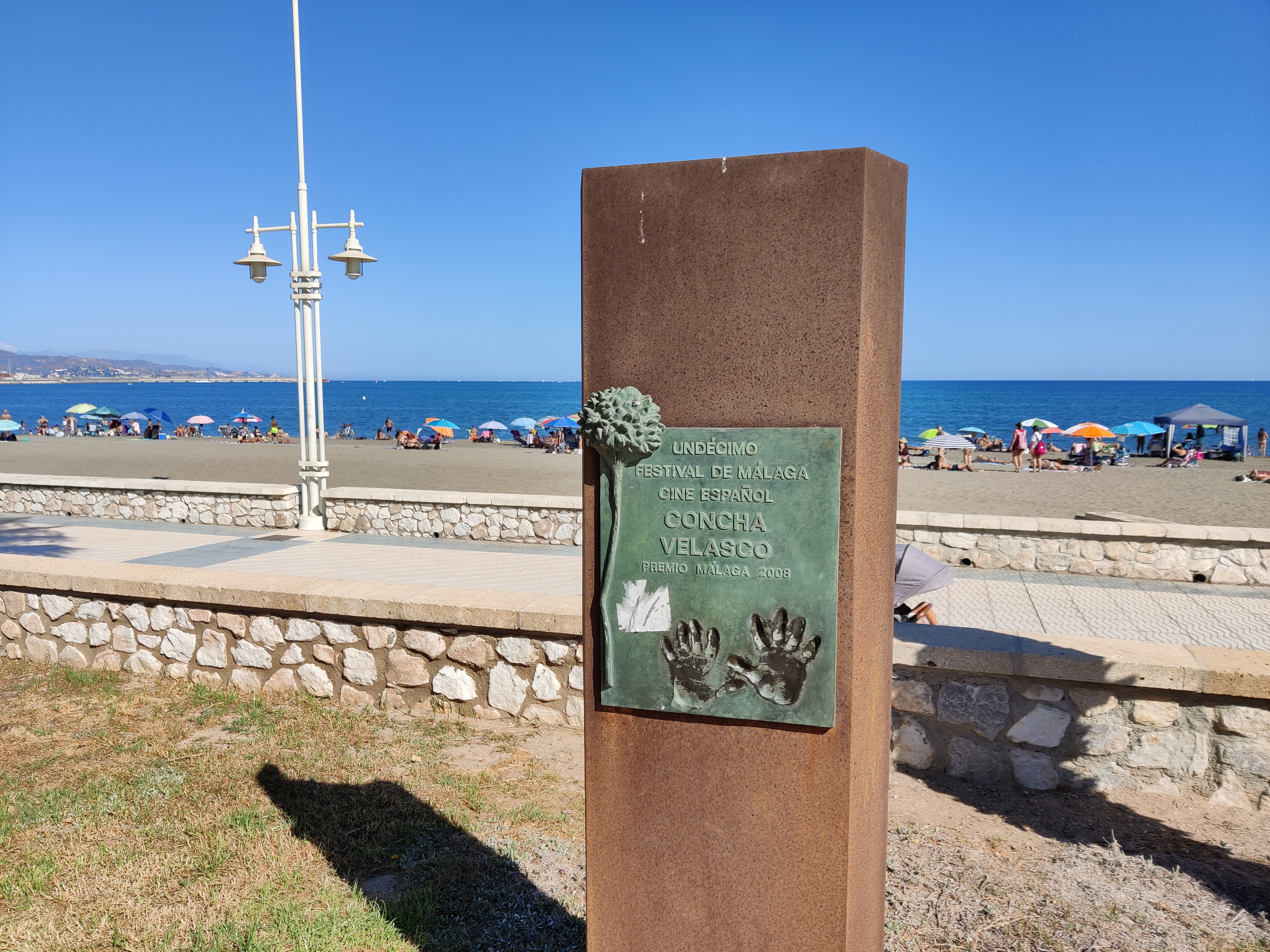
Recognition at the Málaga Film Festival

On 27 June 2011, a star with her name was placed at the Madrid Walk of Fame. On 3 November 2011, the Sala Concha Velasco –a multipurpose theater with capacity for 610 seats on retractable stands– was opened at the Valladolid Arts Laboratory. On 8 May 2014, a street in Valladolid received her name. On 10 February 2024, she was honored at the 38th Goya Awards ceremony, held in Valladolid, by its presenters Ana Belén, Javier Ambrossi, and Javier Calvo performing a medley of two of her songs "¡Mamá, quiero ser artista!" and "Chica ye ye". She was honored in the opening number of the eleventh season of Tu cara me suena aired on 12 April 2024 on Antena 3, Roko impersonated her, and the season's contestants joined, (Note: David Bustamante, Raquel Sánchez-Silva, Supremme de Luxe, Julia Medina, Valeria Ros, Juanra Bonet, Raoul Vazquez, Conchita, and Miguel Lago; in addition to Merche and Falete as Carmen Sevilla and María Jiménez that were also honored.) in singing "¡Mamá, quiero ser artista!". On 3 October 2024, Correos, the Spanish postal service, issued a sheet of stamps in tribute to her as part of its Spanish cinema series.
