= Asunción Balaguer =

Spanish actress (1925–2019)

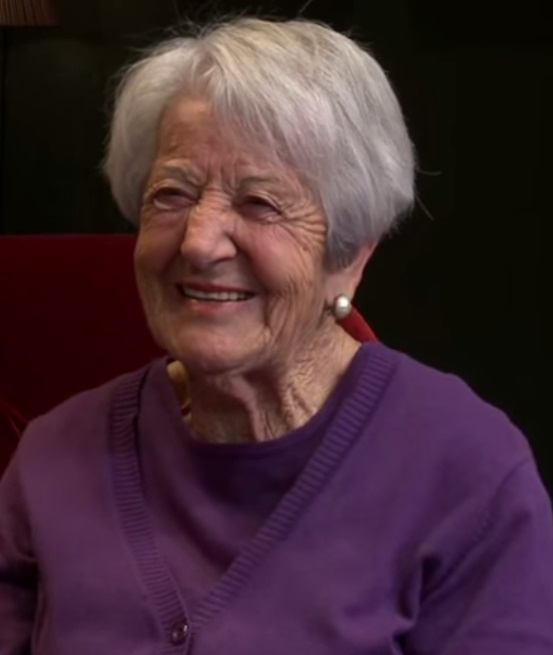
- Balaguer in 2014
- Born: María Asunción Balaguer Golobart; 8 November 1925; Manresa, Barcelona, Spain
- Died: 23 November 2019 (aged 94); Cercedilla, Madrid, Spain
- Occupation: Actress
- Years active: 1952–2016
- Spouse: Francisco Rabal (m. 1950; died 2001)

María Asunción Balaguer Golobart (8 November 1925 – 23 November 2019) was a Spanish actress. She appeared in more than 100 films and television shows from 1952 to 2016. In 1983, she played El barón, by Leandro Fernández de Moratín. In 1984, she played La cena del rey Baltasar, by Pedro Calderón de la Barca.

She was married in 1951 to the actor Francisco Rabal, who died in 2001. She died on 23 November 2019 in Cercedilla, Madrid at the age of 94 after a stroke suffered the previous week. Her daughter Teresa Rabal is also an actress.

== Selected filmography ==
- El canto del gallo (1955)
- La otra imagen (1973)
- The Witching Hour (1985)
- Lulú de noche (1986)
- El hermano bastardo de Dios (1986)
- The Bird of Happiness (1993)
- El evangelio de las maravillas (1998)
- Mine Alone (2001)

=== Television ===
- Polseres vermelles
- Merlí
