= Fernando Usero =

Spanish footballer (born 1984)

Personal information
- Full name: Fernando Usero Toledano
- Date of birth: 27 March 1984 (age 42)
- Place of birth: Brazatortas, Spain
- Height: 1.75 m (5 ft 9 in)
- Position: Midfielder

Youth career
- Málaga

Senior career*
Years	Team	Apps	(Gls)
2003–2004	Atlético Madrid B	3	(1)
2004–2006	Málaga B	72	(11)
2005–2006	Málaga	4	(0)
2006–2008	Poli Ejido	76	(4)
2008–2010	Elche	65	(10)
2010–2011	Córdoba	34	(3)
2011–2015	Asteras Tripolis	100	(10)
2015	→ Alcorcón (loan)	14	(0)
2015–2016	Atromitos	26	(2)
2017	Mirandés	6	(0)
2018	Toledo	14	(0)
2018–2019	Puertollano	41	(5)
Total		355	(46)
- * Club domestic league appearances and goals

Fernando Usero Toledano (born 27 March 1984) is a Spanish former professional footballer who played as a central midfielder.

== Club career ==
Usero was born in Brazatortas, Province of Ciudad Real, Castilla–La Mancha. After emerging through Málaga CF's youth system, and a brief spell at Atlético Madrid's reserves, he returned to the Andalusians, playing two seasons with their B team in the Segunda División and scoring a career-best seven goals in 2005–06. Additionally, he managed to appear four times for the main squad in the same timeframe, as both were relegated come June 2006; his La Liga debut came on 9 January 2005, in a 2–1 away loss against Racing de Santander.

Usero then spent two years at Málaga neighbours Polideportivo Ejido, being an undisputed starter and suffering relegation at the end of the 2007–08 campaign, following which he signed for another club in the second division, Elche CF. In summer 2011, having totalled 247 matches in Spain's second tier, he moved abroad for the first time and joined a host of compatriots at Asteras Tripolis F.C. in Greece, arriving from Córdoba CF.

On 19 June 2015, after a four-month loan with AD Alcorcón back in his homeland, Usero returned to the Super League Greece and signed a two-year contract with Atromitos FC. He went back to Spain afterwards, seeing out his career aged 35 by representing CD Mirandés (second division), CD Toledo (Segunda División B) and amateurs Calvo Sotelo Puertollano.

== Career statistics ==
As of 17 April 2016

Club	Season	League			Cup		League Cup		Continental		Other		Total	
Club	Season	Division	Apps	Goals	Apps	Goals	Apps	Goals	Apps	Goals	Apps	Goals	Apps	Goals
Atlético Madrid B	2003–04	Segunda División B	3	1	—		—		—		—		3	1
Málaga	2004–05	La Liga	2	0	0	0	—		—		—		2	0
Málaga	2005–06	La Liga	2	0	0	0	—		—		—		2	0
Málaga	Total		4	0	0	0	—		—		—		4	0
Poli Ejido	2006–07	Segunda División	38	2	1	0	—		—		—		39	2
Poli Ejido	2007–08	Segunda División	38	2	1	0	—		—		—		39	2
Poli Ejido	Total		76	4	2	0	—		—		—		78	4
Elche	2008–09	Segunda División	41	5	3	0	—		—		—		44	5
Elche	2009–10	Segunda División	24	5	0	0	—		—		—		24	5
Elche	Total		65	10	3	0	—		—		—		68	10
Córdoba	2010–11	Segunda División	34	3	6	0	—		—		—		40	3
Asteras Tripolis	2011–12	Super League Greece	27	2	4	0	—		—		—		31	2
Asteras Tripolis	2012–13	Super League Greece	28	3	5	3	—		4 (Note: Appearances in UEFA Europa League)	1	—		37	7
Asteras Tripolis	2013–14	Super League Greece	36	4	2	0	—		2	0	—		40	4
Asteras Tripolis	2014–15	Super League Greece	9	1	0	0	—		10	1	—		19	2
Asteras Tripolis	Total		100	10	11	3	—		16	2	—		127	15
Alcorcón (loan)	2014–15	Segunda División	14	0	0	0	—		—		—		14	0
Atromitos	2015–16	Super League Greece	26	2	6	0	—		4	0	—		36	2
Career total			322	30	28	3	—		20	2	—		370	35

== Honours ==
Asteras Tripolis

- Greek Football Cup runner-up: 2012–13

Individual

- Super League Greece Team of the Season: 2013–14
