= Masters M45 1500 metres world record progression =

This is the progression of world record improvements of the 1500 metres M45 division of Masters athletics.

Key

Incomplete information Pending

Hand	Auto	Athlete	Nationality	Birthdate	Location	Date
	3:48.53	Jesus Borrego Llamas	Spain	16.07.1961	Monterrey	20.06.2008
	3:52.43	Jesus Borrego Llamas	Spain	16.07.1961	Herrera	12.07.2008
	3:56.39	John Hinton	United States	01.05.1962	Durham	06.05.2007
3:58.3		Peter Molloy	United Kingdom	08.01.1949	Watford	09.08.1995
	3:59.24	Ken Sparks	United States	25.01.1945	New York City	29.07.1990
	3:59.90	James McNamara	Ireland	17.04.1939	Dublin	27.05.1984
4:03.2		Piet Majoor	Netherlands	30.01.1932	Amsterdam	08.06.1977
