= Ambitious (film) =

- Directed by: Pedro Lazaga
- Written by: Pedro Lazaga; José Vicente Puente
- Starring: Teresa Rabal; José Bódalo; Manuel Zarzo
- Cinematography: Antonio L. Ballesteros
- Edited by: Alfonso Santacana
- Music by: Eduardo Rodrigo
- Production company: Producciones Cinematográficas Ales
- Distributed by: Suevia Films
- Release date: 10 May 1976
- Country: Spain
- Language: Spanish

Ambitious (Spanish: Ambiciosa) is a 1976 Spanish drama film directed by Pedro Lazaga and starring Teresa Rabal, José Bódalo and Manuel Zarzo.

== Cast ==
- Teresa Rabal as Juana
- José Bódalo as D. Matías
- Manuel Zarzo as Esteban
- Didi Sherman as Diana
- Manuel Alexandre as Mariano
- May Heatherly as Margarita
- Elisa Montés as Amparo
- Fernando Hilbeck
- Rosa Valenty as Françoise
- Carmen Mínguez
- Fernando E. Romero
- José Canalejas
- Florinda Chico as Jacoba
- Tony Isbert as Alberto
- Luis Rico
- Cecilia Trevin
- Luis González Páramo
- Mari Carmen Duque
- Clotilde Sola
- Alfredo Enríquez
- Remigio Sacristán
- Milo Quesada
- Araceli Conde
- Concha Rabal
- Mery Leyva
- José Luis Lizalde
- Gaby Álvarez

== Bibliography ==
- Àngel Comas. Diccionari de llargmetratges: el cinema a Catalunnya després del franquisme, 1975-2003. Cossetània Edicions, 2003.
