= The Wild Ones of San Gil Bridge =

1966 film

- Directed by: Antoni Ribas
- Written by: Miguel Sanz; Antoni Ribas; José Martín Recuerda (play)
- Cinematography: Francisco Fraile
- Edited by: José Antonio Rojo
- Music by: Carmelo A. Bernaola
- Production company: Montornés Films
- Distributed by: Paramount Films de España
- Release date: 1966
- Running time: 90 minutes
- Country: Spain
- Language: Spanish

The Wild Ones of San Gil Bridge (Spanish:Las salvajes en Puente San Gil) is a 1966 Spanish comedy film directed by Antoni Ribas and starring Adolfo Marsillach, Elena María Tejeiro and María Silva.

== Cast ==
- Adolfo Marsillach
- Elena María Tejeiro
- María Silva
- Nuria Torray
- Luis Marín
- Rosanna Yanni
- Jesús Aristu
- Trini Alonso
- Carmen de Lirio
- Vicky Lagos
- Valentín Tornos
- Charo Soriano
- Marisa Paredes
- Luisa Sala

== Bibliography ==
- Peter Cowie & Derek Elley. World Filmography: 1967. Fairleigh Dickinson University Press, 1977.
