= Carmen de Lirio =

Spanish actress

- Born: 31 October 1926; Zaragoza, Spain
- Died: 4 August 2014 (aged 87); Barcelona, Spain
- Occupation: Actress
- Years active: 1951-2003 (film)

Carmen de Lirio (31 October 1926 – 4 August 2014) was a Spanish film actress.

== Selected filmography ==
- The Evil Forest (1951)
- It Was She Who Wanted It! (1953)
- Peace Never Comes (1960)
- The Two Rivals (1960)
- Goliath Against the Giants (1961)
- The Wild Ones of San Gil Bridge (1966)
- Marquis de Sade: Justine (1969)
- The House of the Doves (1972)
- Clara is the Price (1975)
- The Cheerful Colsada Girls (1984)

== Bibliography ==
- Peter Cowie & Derek Elley. World Filmography: 1967. Fairleigh Dickinson University Press, 1977.
