= Antonio Gala Foundation =

Spanish arts non-profit organization

The Antonio Gala Foundation for Young Artists (Fundación Antonio Gala para jóvenes artistas) is a private non-profit organization dedicated to fostering artistic creation. It is registered in the Register of Foundations of the Ministry of Culture of Spain, recognizing the general interest of its purposes.

Founded by writer Antonio Gala in the city of Cordoba in 2002, it is headquartered in the Convent of Corpus Christi, built in the seventeenth century. The foundation's motto is a verse in Latin the "Song of Songs": "It puts me cor tuum ut signaculum Super" or "Set me as a seal upon your heart." Its main sponsor is the Caja de Ahorros y Monte de Piedad de Córdoba (CajaSur).

== Activities ==
- Antonio Gala Foundation announces twenty seats annually for young artists between eighteen and twenty-five in Spanish.
- The artists reside for a year at the headquarters of the foundation, where artists are selected for one-year scholarship to pursue freedom and coexistence in their literary, musical or art projects.
- The Foundation does not have teachers, but artists receive lectures and visit already established artists who guide them and advise.

== Patrons ==
- President: Antonio Gala
- Patrons born: Angel Maria Cañadilla Moyano, Teodulfo Lagunero
- Patrons elected: Francisco Moreno Crespo, Anton Garcia Abril, José Guirao Cabrera, Jesus Badenes River, Angela González López de Carrizosa, Luis Cardenas Garcia
- Secretary of the Board: José María Gala
