= Plaza de Andalucía =

Plaza in Algeciras, Spain

Coordinates: 36°7′57″N 5°27′07″W

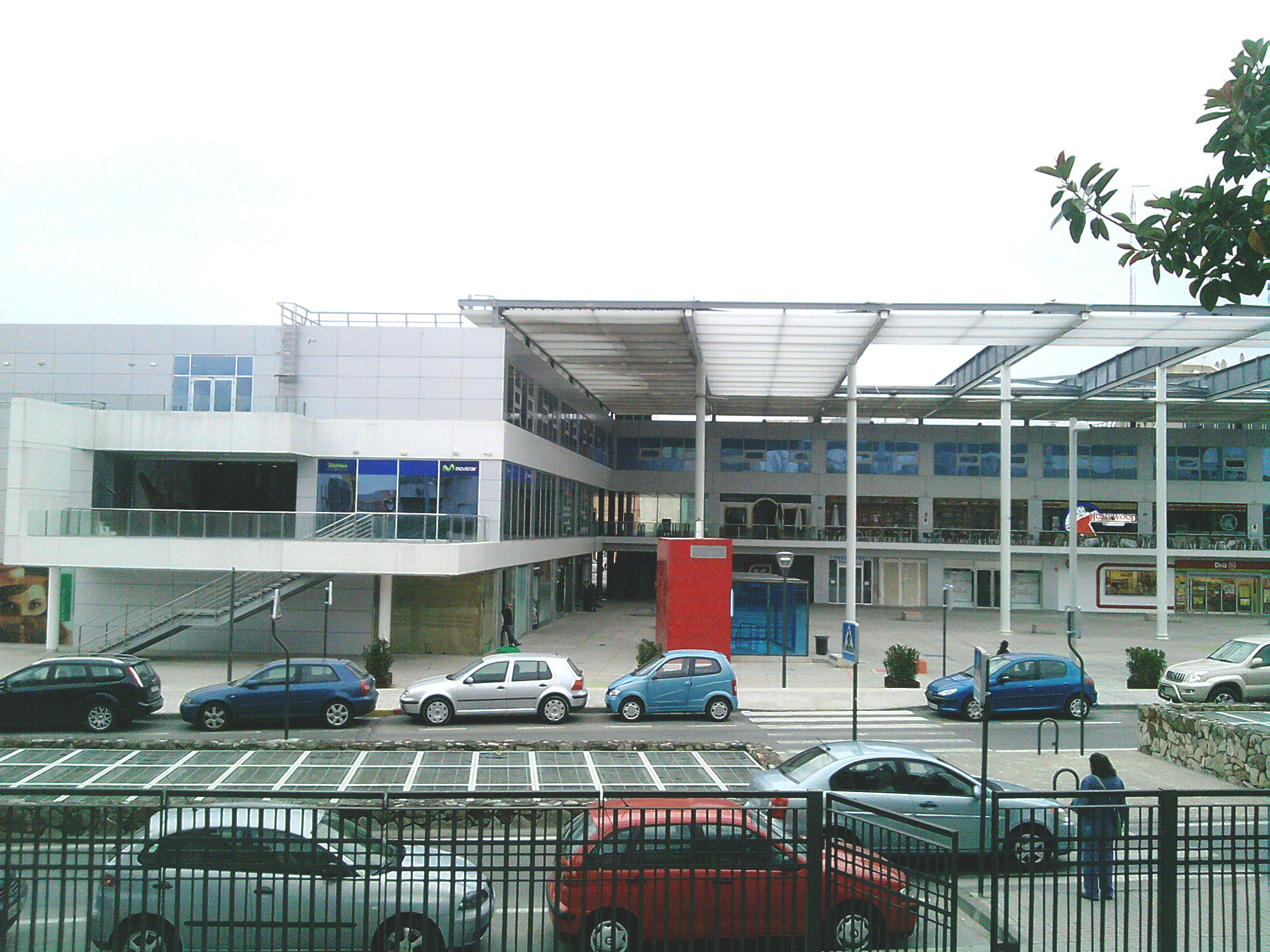

Plaza de Andalucía is a plaza in Algeciras, Spain. It is located close to the historic centre of the city, just south of the Kursaal, and adjacent to two major roads, the Cadiz-Malaga Road and Avenida de Blas Infante. In 2007 it was remodeled to house a shopping mall, business offices and subterranean car park. The Metropolitan Transportation Consortium Gibraltar, regulator of public transport in the county, and municipal television station Onda Algeciras are based in the Plaza de Andalucía.
