= The Good Days Lost =

- Spanish: Los buenos días perdidos
- Directed by: Rafael Gil
- Written by: Antonio Gala; Miguel Rubio
- Starring: Juan Luis Galiardo; Teresa Rabal; Queta Claver
- Cinematography: José F. Aguayo
- Edited by: José Luis Matesanz
- Music by: Carmelo A. Bernaola
- Production companies: Coral Producciones Cinematográficas; Rafael Gil Álvarez
- Release date: 24 November 1975
- Running time: 105 minutes
- Country: Spain
- Language: Spanish

The Good Days Lost (Spanish: Los buenos días perdidos) is a 1975 Spanish comedy film directed by Rafael Gil and starring Juan Luis Galiardo, Teresa Rabal, and Queta Claver.

== Cast ==
- Juan Luis Galiardo as Lorenzo
- Teresa Rabal as Consuelito
- Queta Claver as Hortensia
- Manuel Galiana as Cleofás
- Erasmo Pascual as Don Remigui
- Mabel Escaño as apothecarian
- Eulália del Pino as Genoveva
- Manuel Ayuso as Comerciante
