= La ciutat cremada =

La ciutat cremada / La ciudad quemada
- Directed by: Antoni Ribas
- Starring: Ángela Molina; Pau Garsaball; Jeannine Mestre; Xabier Elorriaga; Patty Shepard
- Release date: 20 September 1976
- Running time: 156 minutes
- Country: Spain
- Languages: Catalan, Spanish

La ciutat cremada (The Burned City; Spanish title: La ciudad quemada) is a 1976 Spanish historical film directed by Antoni Ribas.

== Cast ==
- Ángela Molina as Roser Palau
- Pau Garsaball as Sr. Palau
- Jeannine Mestre as Remei Palau
- Montserrat Salvador as Sra. Palau
- Francisco Casares as Frederic
- Xabier Elorriaga as Josep
- Adolf Marsillach as Francesc Cambó
- José Luis López Vázquez as Enric Prat de la Riba
- Ovidi Montllor as Emiliano Iglesias
- Josep Vivó as Doctor Robert
- Alfred Lucchetti as Alejandro Lerroux
- Núria Espert as Desarrapada
- Joan Manuel Serrat as Ramón Clemente García
- Teresa Gimpera as Sra. Vallès i Ribot
- Patty Shepard as Sor Engràcia
- Mary Santpere as Mare de Rull-Artós
- Ricard Palmerola as Sr. Roig
- Marta May as Desarrapada
- Iván Tubau as Ferran
- Rafael Anglada as Sr. Esteve
- Joan Borràs as Puig i Cadafalch
- Víctor Israel as Inspector Haya
- Fernando Millet as Periodista de La Vanguardia
- Alejo del Peral as Home valencià
- Eva Lyberten as Noia rossa de la festa

== Plot ==
The story takes place in Barcelona following the disaster in Cuba until the Tragic Week (la Semana Trágica), approximately from 1899 until 1909, by means of events which befall a family in that city.
