= Teresa Rabal =

Spanish actress, singer and television presenter (born 1952)

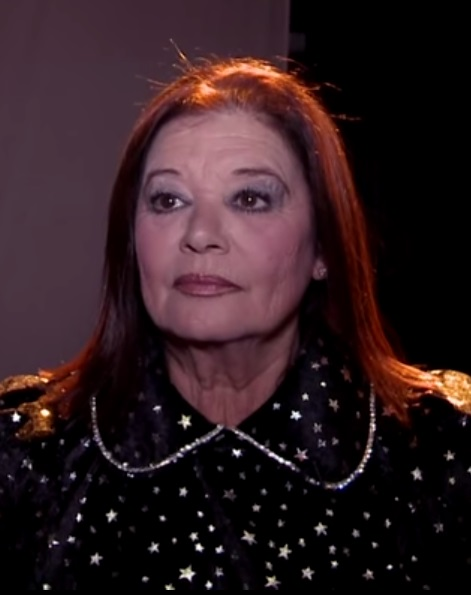
- Rabal in 2013.
- Born: María Teresa Rabal Balaguer; 5 November 1952 (age 73); Barcelona, Spain
- Occupations: Actress, singer, presenter
- Years active: 1961–
- Parents: Francisco Rabal (father); Asunción Balaguer (mother)

María Teresa Rabal Balaguer (born 1952) is a Spanish actress, singer and television presenter. The daughter of actors Francisco Rabal and Asunción Balaguer, she first appeared as child actor before going on to star in several 1970s films as an adult.

== Selected filmography ==
- Viridiana (1961)
- Goya, a Story of Solitude (1971)
- Spaniards in Paris (1971)
- White Sister (1972)
- Matrimonio al desnudo (1974)
- The Good Days Lost (1975)
- The Killer is Not Alone (1975)
- Ambitious (1976)
- Despite Everything (2019)

== Bibliography ==
- Phil Powrie, Ann Davies & Bruce Babington. The Trouble with Men: Masculinities in European and Hollywood Cinema. Wallflower Press, 2004.
