= La truhana =

Play written by Antonio Gala

La truhana is a Spanish musical comedy written by Antonio Gala. It premiered at the Central Theatre during the Seville Expo on 2 October 1992. The show premiered in Madrid a week later.

== Premise ==
The story is set in 17th-century Spain, under the reign of Felipe IV. He falls in love with María Fernández, a famous actress. She takes on the name la truhana (the rogue) and sets out on a journey through the Spanish Empire, acting as a bandit with the intention of fleeing the king and avoiding becoming his courtesan. Along the way, la truhana collects new allies to travel with her. The work is a musical comedy and is told through 19 musical numbers.

== Production ==
Migual Narros directed, Paco Marsó produced, and music was by Juan Cánovas. The cast included Concha Velasco, Juan Carlos Naya, Fernando Conde, Lorenzo Valverde, Francisco Merino, Jose M. Subiza, Margarita García Ortega, and Natalia Duarte.
