= Los tramposos =

- Directed by: Pedro Lazaga
- Written by: Luis García Berlanga; José Luis Colina
- Starring: Tony Leblanc; Antonio Ozores; Concha Velasco; Laura Valenzuela; Venancio Muro; José Luis López Vázquez; Carlos Díaz de Mendoza
- Music by: Antón García Abril
- Release date: 1959
- Running time: 88 minutes
- Country: Spain
- Language: Spanish

Los tramposos ("The cheaters") is a 1959 Spanish comedy film directed by Pedro Lazaga and starring Tony Leblanc and Antonio Ozores. The movie is about two small-time con-men.

== Plot ==
Two small-time con men make a living of swindling people. They have a relatively happy life despite some "visits" to Carabanchel Prison. However, one of them, Virgilio, falls in love with the sister of his partner. Since she is not happy about their style of living, they decide to become honest people. Having failed in other jobs, open their own travel agency, which turns out to be a success after some comical incidents.

== Critic ==
Spanish critic Carlos Aguilar in his Guía del cine español considers this film "in his own way, a classic".
