= El manuscrito carmesí =

1990 novel by

- Author: Antonio Gala
- Language: Spanish
- Publisher: Planeta
- Publication date: 1990
- Publication place: Spain
- Pages: 611
- ISBN: 9788432070228

El manuscrito carmesí (lit. 'The Crimson Manuscript') is a 1990 historical novel by the Spanish writer Antonio Gala. It is a fictional autobiography of Boabdil, the last ruler of the Nasrid dynasty in the Emirate of Granada. It was Gala's first novel.

The book became Gala's most critically acclaimed work. It received the Premio Planeta de Novela.
