= Amor a la española =

1967 film

- Directed by: Fernando Merino
- Written by: Alfonso Paso; José Luis Dibildos (story)
- Starring: José Luis López Vázquez
- Release date: 1967
- Countries: Spain, Argentina
- Language: Spanish

Amor a la española (English: Love, Spanish Style) is a 1967 Spanish romantic comedy musical directed by Fernando Merino and script written by Alfonso Paso. It is based on the story by José Luis Dibildos.

== Cast ==
- José Luis López Vázquez as Francisco Paco Lafuente
- Manolo Gómez Bur as Patricio Ruiz
- Alfredo Landa as Rafa
- Erika Wallner as Ingrid
- Elena María Tejeiro
- Margot Cottens
- Pastor Serrador
- Alfonso Paso as Van Criep
- Laura Valenzuela as Marianne Leroix
- Kia Nelke
- Sara Guasch
- Montserrat Noé
- Fernando Nogueras
- José Luis Coll
- Diana Sorel
