= Peace Never Comes =

1960 film

- Directed by: León Klimovsky
- Written by: Domingo Almendros; Enrique Domínguez Millán; León Klimovsky; Leonardo Martín; Emilio Romero (novel); Jesús Sáiz
- Produced by: Jesús Sáiz
- Starring: Adolfo Marsillach; Concha Velasco; Carmen de Lirio
- Cinematography: Ricardo Torres
- Edited by: Antonio Gimeno
- Music by: Cristóbal Halffter
- Production company: CIFESA
- Distributed by: CIFESA
- Release date: 19 December 1960
- Running time: 118 minutes
- Country: Spain
- Language: Spanish

Peace Never Comes (Spanish: La paz empieza nunca) is a 1960 Spanish drama film directed by León Klimovsky and starring Adolfo Marsillach, Concha Velasco and Carmen de Lirio. It is set in the years following the Spanish Civil War. A man uses his relationship with a former lover to infiltrate a group of Republican insurgents against Francoist Spain.

== Partial cast ==
- Adolfo Marsillach as Juan López, a Falangist.
- Concha Velasco as Paula
- Carmen de Lirio as Pura
- Carlos Casaravilla as Dóriga
- Kanda Jaque as Carmina
- Antonio Casas as Pedro
- Jesús Puente as Mencia
- Mario Berriatúa as Jorge
- José Manuel Martín
- Arturo López
- Mara Laso as Concha

== Bibliography ==
- Bentley, Bernard. A Companion to Spanish Cinema. Boydell & Brewer 2008.
