= Swastika (film) =

Film

- Directed by: Philippe Mora
- Written by: Lutz Becker; Philippe Mora
- Produced by: Sanford Lieberson; David Puttnam
- Starring: Adolf Hitler; Eva Braun
- Cinematography: Andrew Patterson
- Edited by: Philippe Mora
- Distributed by: Visual Programme Systems
- Release dates: May 1973 (Cannes); 21 November 1973 (BFI London); 17 January 1974
- Running time: 113 minutes
- Country: United Kingdom
- Language: English

Swastika is a 1973 British documentary film by Philippe Mora. Its screening at that year's Cannes Film Festival nearly caused a riot.

== Summary ==
A study of Nazism and the private lives of Adolf Hitler and his wife Eva Braun through newsreel clips, pre-war propaganda, documentary material and even Braun's color home movies.

== Home media ==
It was released by Kino Lorber on DVD on 16 June 2012. The cut most actively available runs 95 minutes, eighteen minutes shorter than its original version.

It is also made available on the streaming platform Fawesome TV.

== See also ==
- Gone with the Wind, an Oscar-winning 1939 American epic romance war film mentioned in the documentary
- Triumph of the Will, a 1935 Nazi propaganda film by Leni Riefenstahl
- List of banned films
