= Carmen, Carmen =

Spanish musical

Carmen, Carmen is a Spanish musical written by Antonio Gala. It premiered in Madrid in 1988. It is based on the opera Carmen.

== Premise ==
The story revolves around Carmen Carmen, a woman who tries with all her might to fight for love and combat heartbreak and mistrust. She is killed four times, each time by a different antagonist, and subsequently resurrected. It both begins and ends in a prison.

The show also makes use of parody and stereotypes to simultaneously critique Spanish traditions, such as bullfighting.

== Development ==
The show was written in 1975, although it did not premiere until more than a decade later.

== Premiere ==
The show premiered on October 9, 1988 at the Teatro Calderón de Madrid. José Carlos Plaza directed, with Juan Cánovas providing music. The cast consisted of Concha Velasco, Tito Valverde, Pedro Mari Sánchez, Toni Cantó, Juan Carlos Martín, Natalia Duarte, Paco Morales, and Tony Cruz. Funds for its production came from a private company.

== Cast ==
	1988 Madrid
Carmen	Concha Velasco
Don Jose	
Don Lisardo	
Hermano Juan	
Curro	

== Musical numbers ==
- Balada de la Carcel - Toni Cantó, Juan Carlos Martín, Fernando Valverde, Pedro María Sánchez and ensemble.
- Las Cigarreras - Natalia Duarte, Concha Velasco, Fernanda Quintana and ensemble.
- Carmen Carmen - Concha Velasco and ensemble
- Lloverá - Concha Velasco.
- Fiesta de Espana - Ensemble.
- Echar a Andar - Concha Velasco and Fernando Valverde.
- Pregon de la Alegría - Concha Velasco and ensemble.
- Entre Sabanas - Miryan Fultz, Amparo Bravo, Concha Velasco and ensemble.
- Coplas del Cuerpo - Concha Velasco, Juan Carlos Martín and ensemble.
- Pesadilla de los Cinco Sentidos - Paco Morales, Juan Carlos Martín, Ignacio Guijón, Juan Carlos Martín, José Navarro, Osky Pimentel and Rory McDermott.
- Curro Donaire - Natalia Duarte and ensemble.
- Alegrías del Torero - Concha Velasco and Pedro María Sánchez. Dancing: Antonio Reyes.
- Bulerias Calientes - Natalia Duarte and ensemble.
- Hamelin - Concha Velasco, Natalia Duarte and Pedro María Sánchez.
- Canción Final - Toni Cantó, Fernando Valverde, Juan Carlos Martín, Pedro María Sánchez, Concha Velasco and ensemble.
- Saludos, Despedida

== Reception ==
The original production was very well received by audiences, with reports of a twelve minute long standing ovation.
