= Antonio Gala =

Spanish writer (1930–2023)

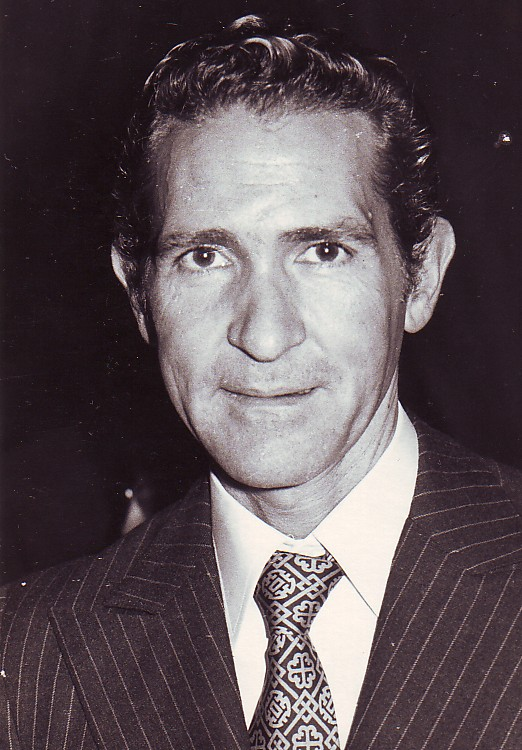
- Gala in 1989
- Born: Antonio Gala Velasco; 2 October 1930; Brazatortas, Spain
- Died: 28 May 2023 (aged 92); Córdoba, Spain
- Occupations: Poet; playwright; novelist; writer

Signature
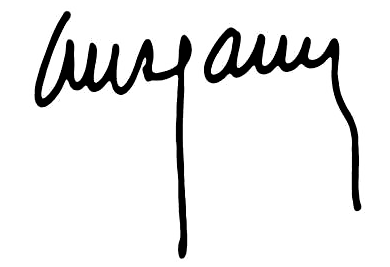

Antonio Gala Velasco (2 October 1930 – 28 May 2023) was a Spanish poet, playwright, novelist, and writer.

== Life and career ==
Antonio Ángel Custodio Gala y Velasco was born on 2 October 1930 in Brazatortas, Ciudad Real (Castile-La Mancha), although he moved very soon to Córdoba and is widely considered an Andalusian.

A graduate in law, philosophy, politics, and economics, he wrote in a wide variety of genres, including journalism, short stories, essays and television scripts. He was awarded several prizes, not only within the field of poetry but also for his contributions to theatre and opera.

Gala's work is more appreciated by his readership than by the critics, who find it hard to classify due to its particular blend of lyricism and epic. Gala's literature is marked by historic issues, which are used more to lighten the present than to deepen in the past.

Among his most successful plays are Los verdes campos del Edén (The Green Fields of Eden, National Theatre Prize "Calderón de la Barca" 1963), Anillos para una dama (Rings for a Lady, 1973), ¿Por qué corres, Ulises? (Why do you run, Ulysses?, 1975), Petra Regalada (1980), Samarkanda (1985), Carmen, Carmen (1988) and La truhana (The rogue, 1992).

Among his collections of poetry are Sonetos de La Zubia (La Zubia Sonets), Poemas de amor (Love Poems), Testamento Andaluz (Andalusian Will), Enemigo íntimo (Intimate Enemy, Adonais Prize 1959), and El Águila Bicéfala (Two-Headed Eagle, 1994).

Gala started to write novels late in life, but he obtained an overwhelming success with El manuscrito carmesí (The Crimson Manuscript, Planeta Prize 1990), La regla de tres (The Rule of Three, 1996) and La pasión turca (Turkish Passion, 1993), adapted for the cinema by Spanish director Vicente Aranda and Más allá del Jardín (Beyond the Garden, 1995), adapted by Pedro Olea.

He was also the founder of the Antonio Gala Foundation in the city of Córdoba, Spain.

Gala died in Córdoba on 28 May 2023, at age 92.

== Political views ==
During the Spanish transition to democracy (1976 to the early 1980s) Gala publicly defended leftist political viewpoints while not linked to a specific political party. In 1978 he called for a statute of autonomy for Andalusia.

In 1981 he was named president of the Spanish–Arab Friendship Association, and fulfilled this role for the first years of existence of this association.

Gala was the president of the civic platform that defended the "no" to Spain's permanence in NATO, in the 1986 referendum. In July 2014, during Israel's military operation in Gaza, Gala was accused of antisemitism because of an article published in the newspaper El Mundo with the following quote:

No matter what the Jews call their civil or military leaders, they end up creating problems for everyone: it is ancient history. Now it is Gaza's turn to suffer their abuses [...] It's not strange that they have been so frequently expelled. What is surprising, is that they persist. Either they are not good, or someone is poisoning them. I am not a racist.

The Comunidad Judía de Madrid (Jewish Community of Madrid) filed a lawsuit against him for discrimination, incitement to hatred and insult to the feelings of the members of a religious community and slander.

== Work ==
=== Drama ===
- Los verdes campos del Edén (1963)
- El caracol en el espejo (1964)
- El sol en el hormiguero (1966)
- Noviembre y un poco de hierba (1967)
- Spain's strip-tease (1970)
- Los buenos días perdidos (1972)
- ¡Suerte, campeón! (1973)
- Anillos para una dama (1973)
- Las cítaras colgadas de los árboles (1974)
- ¿Por qué corres, Ulises? (1975)
- Petra regalada (1980)
- La vieja señorita del paraíso (1980)
- El cementerio de los pájaros (1982)
- Trilogía de la libertad (1983)
- Samarkanda (1985)
- El hotelito (1985)
- Séneca o el beneficio de la duda (1987)
- Carmen, Carmen (1988)
- Cristóbal Colón (1989)
- La truhana (1992)
- Los bellos durmientes (1994)
- Café cantante (1997)
- Las manzanas del viernes (1999)
- Inés desabrochada (2003)

=== Narrative ===
- El manuscrito carmesí (1990)
- La pasión turca (1993)
- Granada de los nazaríes (1994) (crónica histórica)
- Más allá del jardín (1995)
- La regla de tres (1996)
- El corazón tardío (1998) (relatos)
- Las afueras de Dios (1999)
- Ahora hablaré de mí (2000) (autobiografía)
- El imposible olvido (2001)
- Los invitados al jardín (2002) (relatos)
- El dueño de la herida (2003) (relatos)
- El pedestal de las estatuas (2007)
- Los papeles de agua (2008)

=== Poetry ===
- Enemigo íntimo (1959)
- La deshora (1962)
- Meditación en Queronea (1965)
- 11 sonetos de la Zubia (1981)
- Testamento andaluz (1985)
- Poemas cordobeses (1994)
- Poemas de amor (1997)
- El poema de Tobías desangelado (2005)

=== Articles ===
- Texto y pretexto (1977)
- Charlas con Troylo (1981)
- En propia mano (1985)
- Cuadernos de la Dama de Otoño (1985)
- Dedicado a Tobías (1988)
- La soledad sonora (1989)
- Proas y troneras (1993)
- A quien conmigo va (1994)
- Carta a los herederos (1995)
- Troneras (1996)
- La casa sosegada (1998)

== See also ==
- Café Gijón (Madrid)
