= C-9 (Cercanías Madrid) =

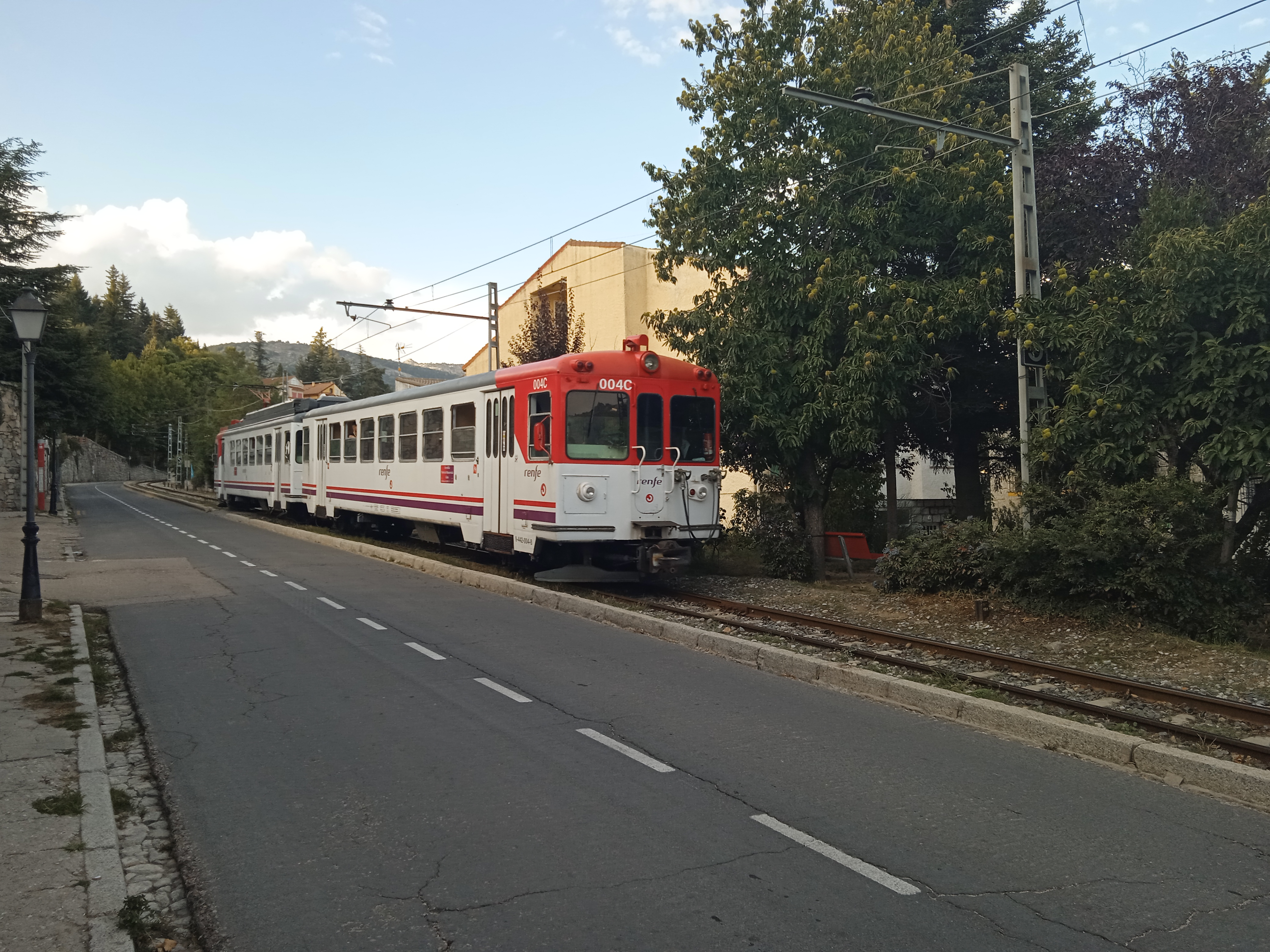
- Class 442 passing through Cercedilla

Overview
- Status: Operational
- Locale: Community of Madrid, Spain
- Termini: Cercedilla Station; Cotos Station
- Stations: 3

Service
- Type: Commuter rail
- System: Cercanías Madrid
- Operator(s): Renfe Operadora
- Rolling stock: RENFE Class 442

History
- Opened: 12 July 1923; 101 years ago

Technical
- Line length: 18.2 km (11.3 mi)
- Number of tracks: Single
- Track gauge: 1,000 mm (3 ft 3 3/8 in) metre gauge
- Electrification: 1.5kV DC
Route map
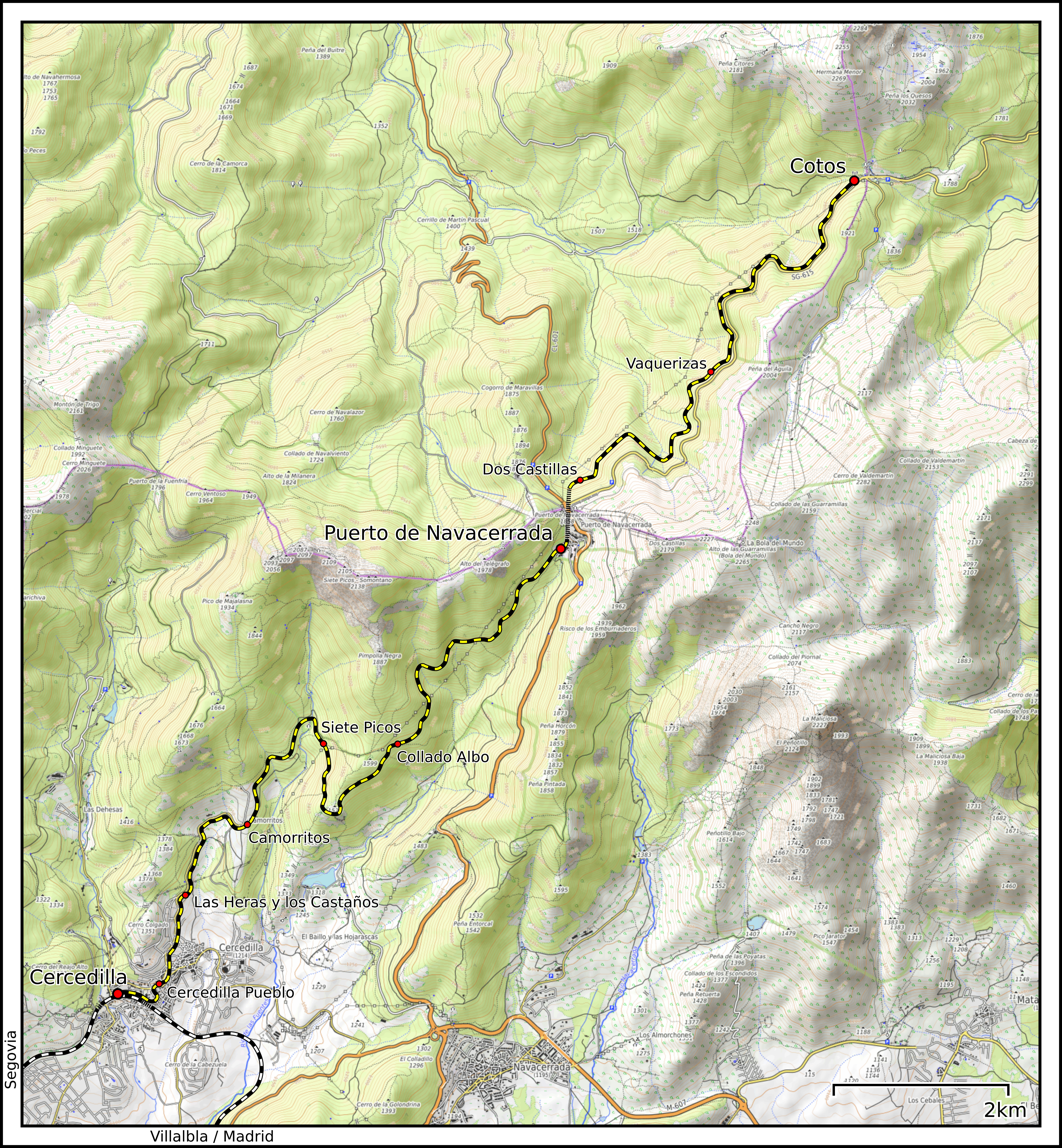

Line C-9, formerly known as the Guadarrama Electric Railway (Spanish: Ferrocarril Eléctrico del Guadarrama), is a narrow-gauge mountain railway incorporated into Madrid's Cercanías commuter rail network. The line is operated by Renfe Operadora and runs through the Guadarrama Mountains from Cercedilla, Madrid to Cotos Pass, Segovia. Although classified as a commuter rail line, Line C-9 primarily serves the ski resorts at Cotos and Navacerrada Passes, connecting with the rest of the commuter rail system with the Line C-8 at Cercedilla Station. Line C-9 is the only metre-gauge railway among the Cercanías Madrid lines.

== History ==
The railway was first conceived in the 1910s as a means of connecting urban Madrid to the Guadarrama Mountains via the Navacerrada Pass. Construction began in 1919 and the section connecting Cercedilla on the Madrid-Segovia Line with Navacerrada opened on 12 July 1923 as the Guadarrama Electric Railway. The opening was attended by the King and Queen of Spain. The line was originally electrified at 1000 V dc. Service was interrupted during the Spanish Civil War but resumed in 1940. In 1954, the line was acquired by the state-controlled RENFE, the only metre gauge line to be operated by them. RENFE began constructing the extension to Cotos Pass in 1959. The section to Cotos, including a 671 m (2,201 ft) long tunnel through Navacerrada, was completed in 1964.

From 1973 to 1975, the entire line was renovated and modernized and the line voltage increased to 1500 V dc. The line was anticipated to continue through the mountains to Segovia, but this plan was abandoned. In 1990, the Guadarrama Electric Railway was incorporated into RENFE's commuter rail network, Cercanías Madrid, and renamed Line C-9. The portion of the line between Navacerrada and Cotos was closed from 2011 to 2012 to undergo renovations.

== Rolling stock ==
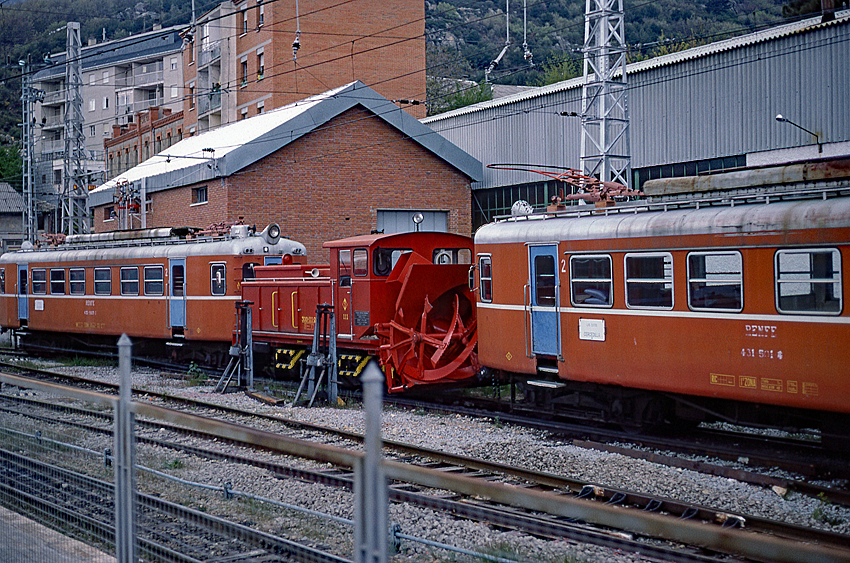
SECN railcars and diesel snowplough in 1983

The original Swiss built railcars ordered in 1922 remained in service until 1964. Initially there were two motor cars and two trailers with an extra motor car and two trailers being added in 1936. They were replaced by second hand SECN stock, nicknamed Navals, from other metre gauge lines, principally from the Ferrocarill de la Loma. These were six motor cars, numbered 3006–3011, and two trailers, numbered 6011–6012. They were later classified by RENFE as Class 431. The brakes on these units proved insufficient for the steeply graded sections of the line with one unit running away approaching Cercedilla, being brought under control just in time. They were gradually replaced by MTM Class 442 units between 1976 and 1982.

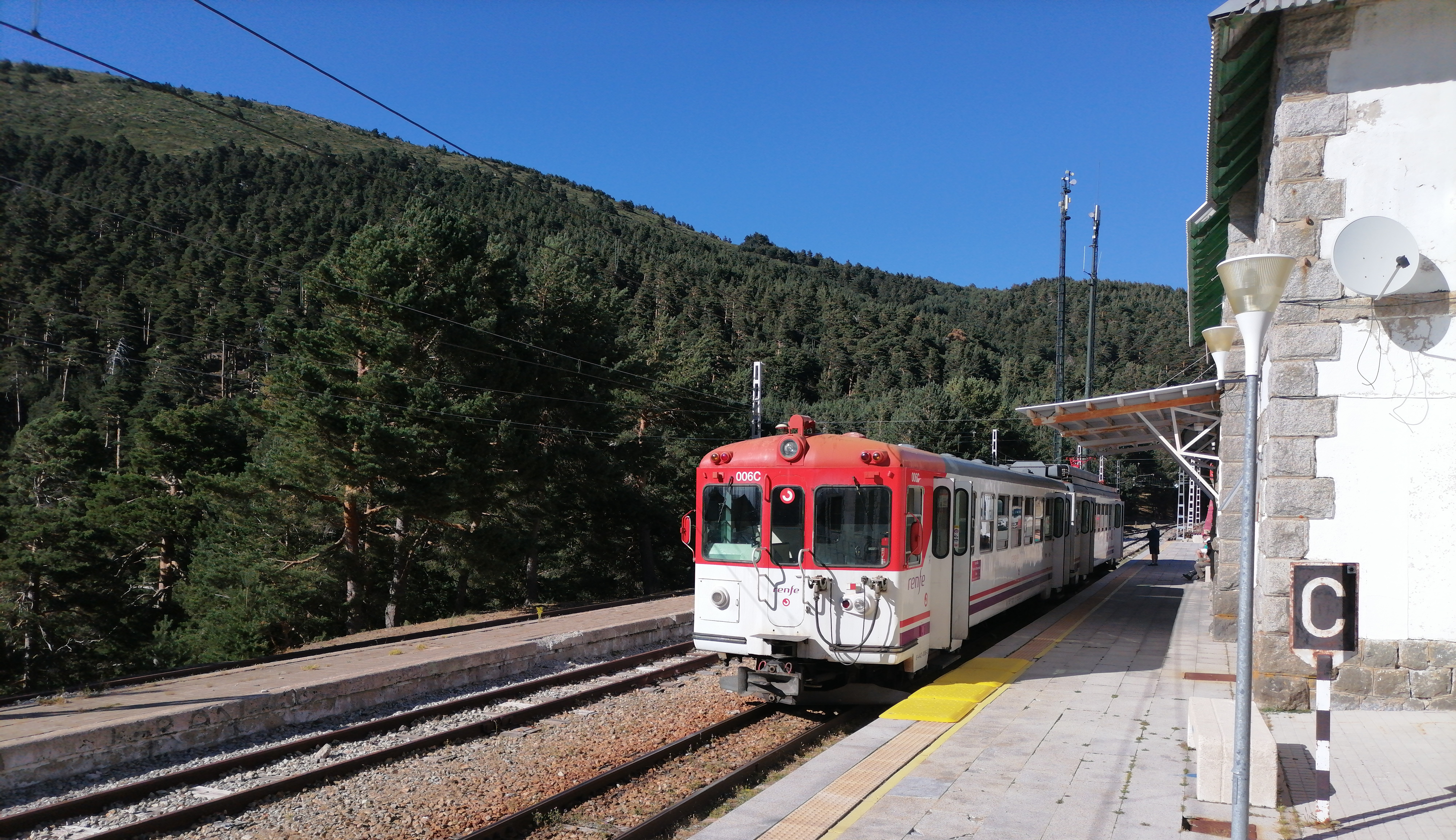
Series 442 at Cotos station. This series will be replaced by a more modern one. It started its service in 1976

In 1967 the line acquired a Stadler diesel shunter, fitted with a rotary snowplough, for engineering use on the line. Initially numbered 111 it was renumbered 300-111-2.

On May 6, 2024, the line was closed to undertake comprehensive renovation works that will last an estimated one year. The closure of the infrastructure was used to carry out the withdrawal of the 442 Series, which will be replaced by new trains purchased in 2020.

=== Preservation ===
The original Swiss railcar, CN1, is preserved at Cercedilla. A railcar and trailer, CN2 and CNR1, have been preserved at the railway museum in Madrid.

== Route ==
Line C-9's 18.2 km (11.3 mi) route begins at Cercedilla Station on the Madrid-Segovia railway line, approximately 45 km (28 mi) northwest of Madrid. From this station at an altitude of approximately 1,150 m (3,770 ft) above sea level, the line slowly climbs up the southern slopes of Siete Picos through Fuenfría Valley until it reaches Navacerrada Pass Station at an altitude 1,765 m (5,791 ft). From here, the railway line crosses the drainage divide of the Guadarrama Mountains and enters Valsaín Valley in Segovia Province. After a gradual climb, the line reaches its terminus of Cotos Station with a peak elevation of 1,819 m (5,968 ft) above sea level. The total gain in elevation of the line is 719 m (2,359 ft).

== Stations ==
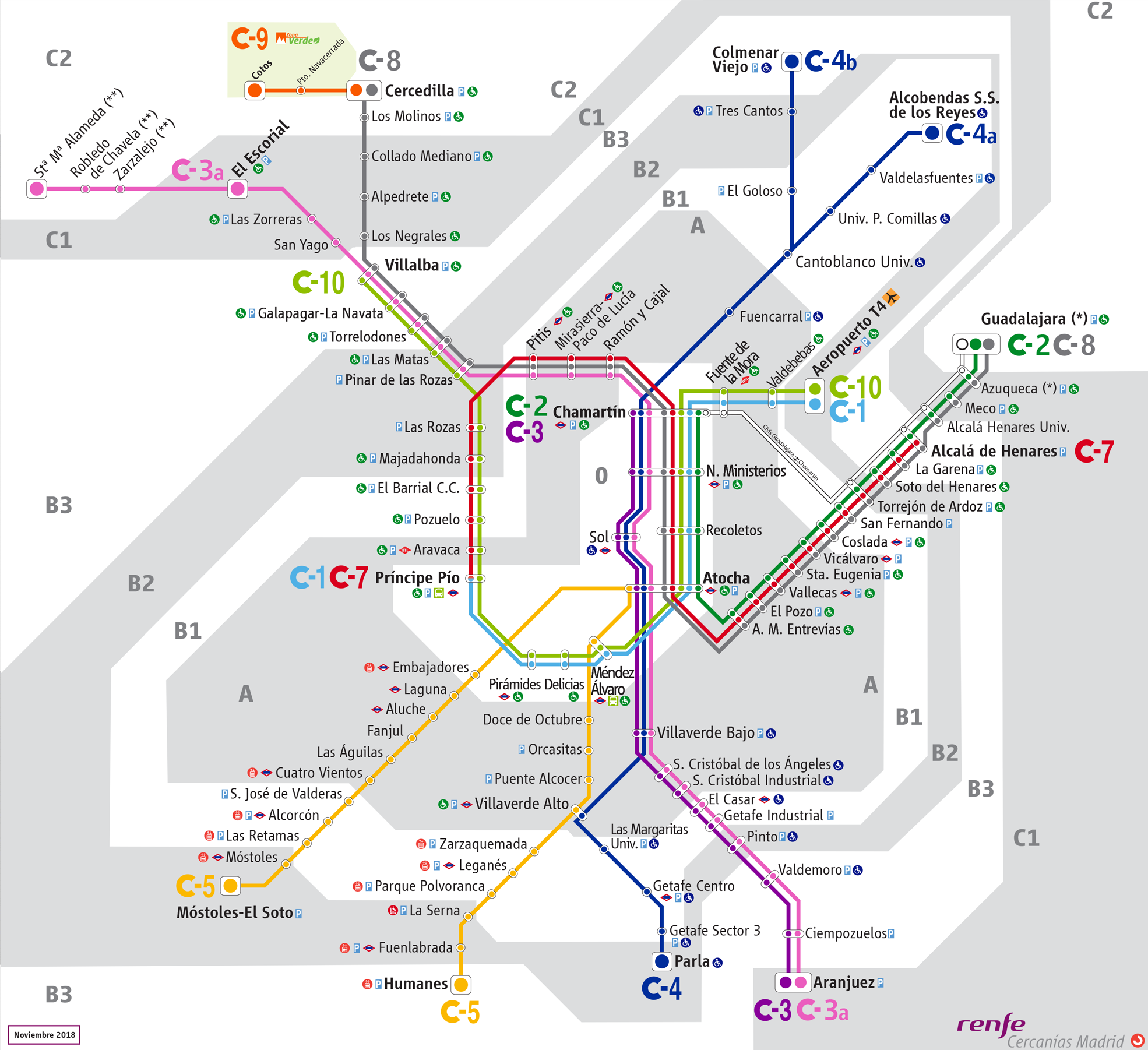
Map of the Cercanías Madrid network, with Line C-9 in upper left corner

Each station served by line C-9 in order from south to north
Station	Cercanías Madrid transfers	Municipality	Fare zone
Cercedilla	C-8	Cercedilla	
Puerto de Navacerrada	-	Cercedilla	
Cotos	-	Real Sitio de San Ildefonso	

== Gallery ==
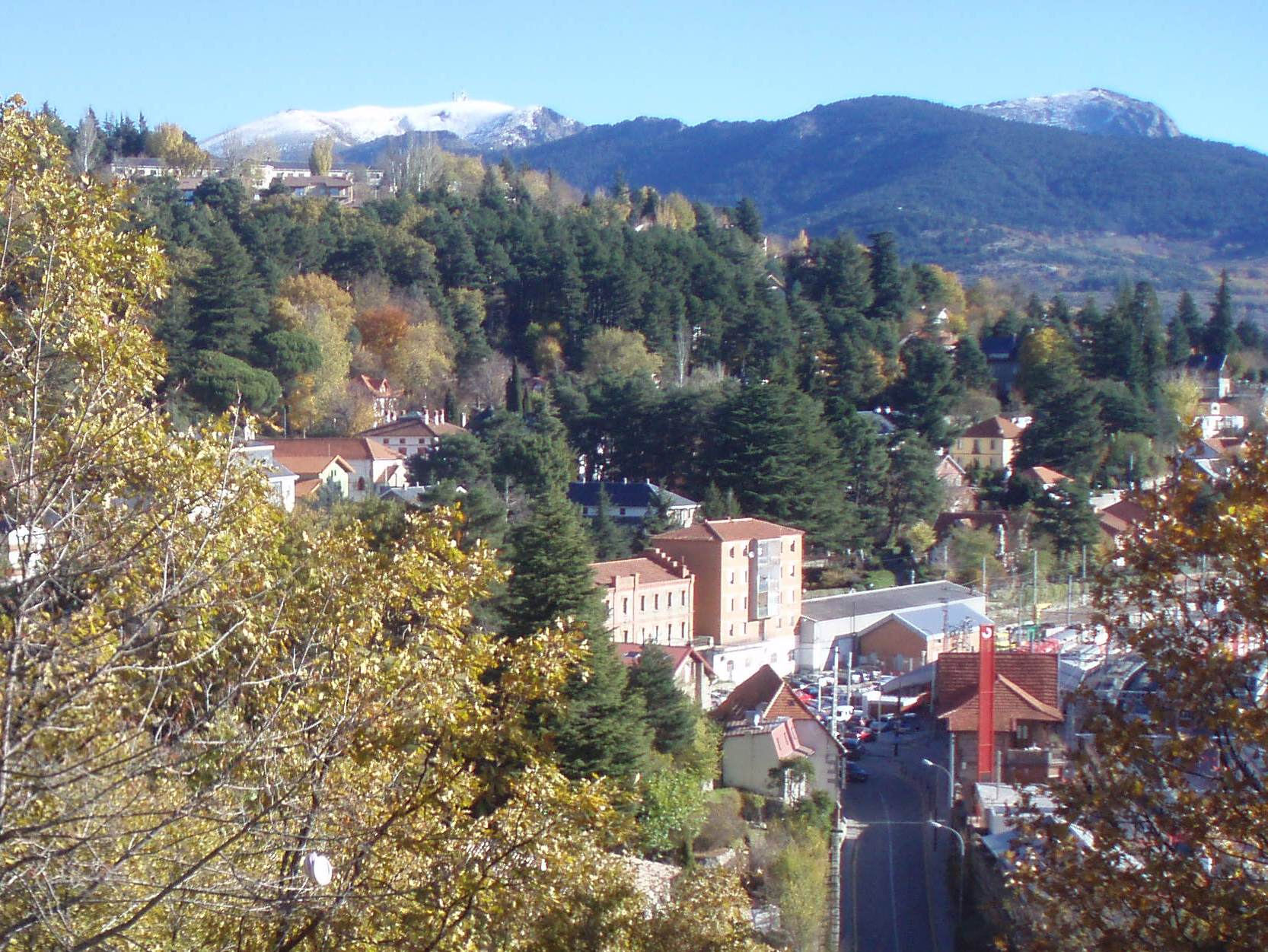
Route terminus in Cercedilla

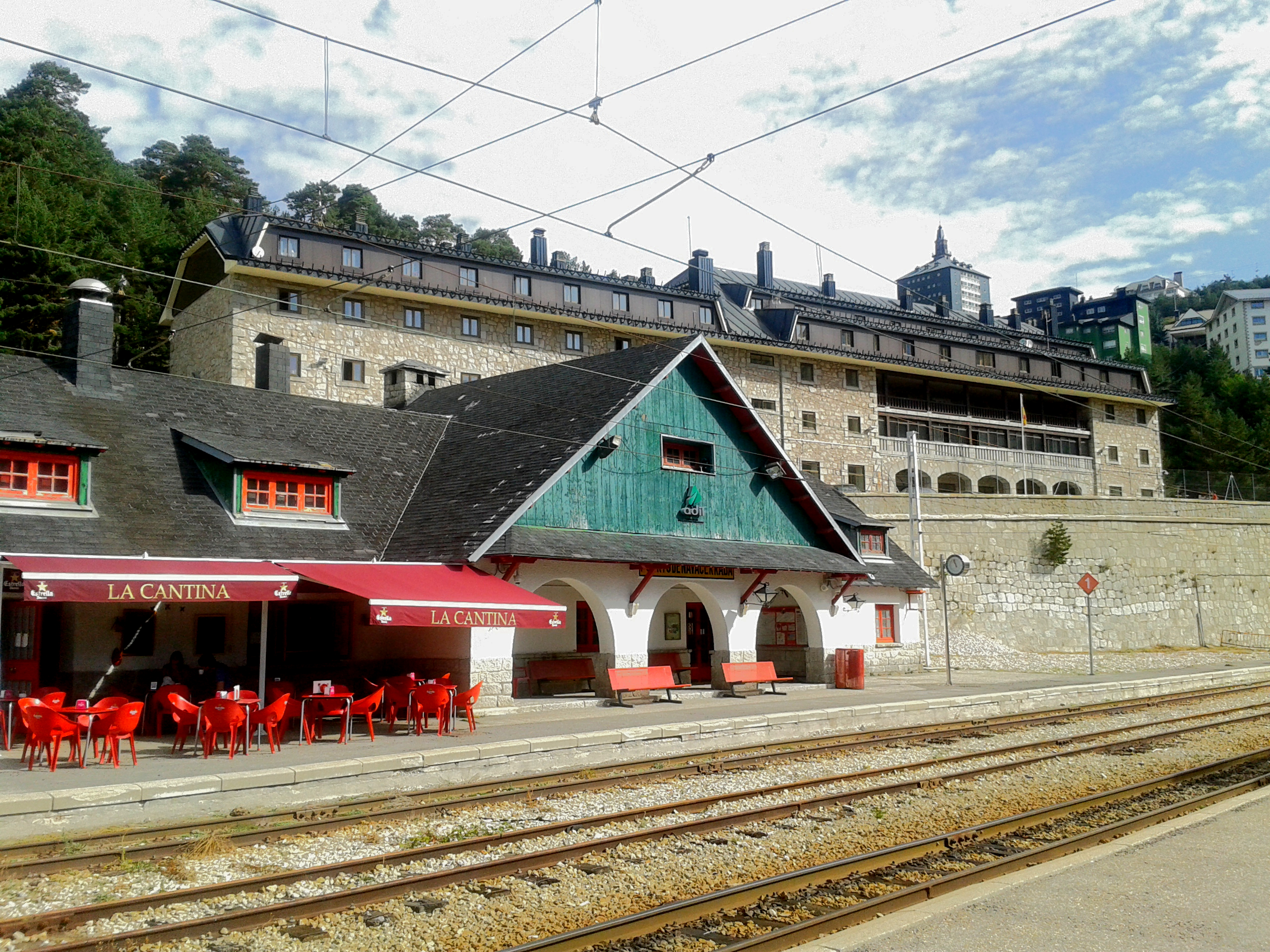
Navacerrada Pass Station

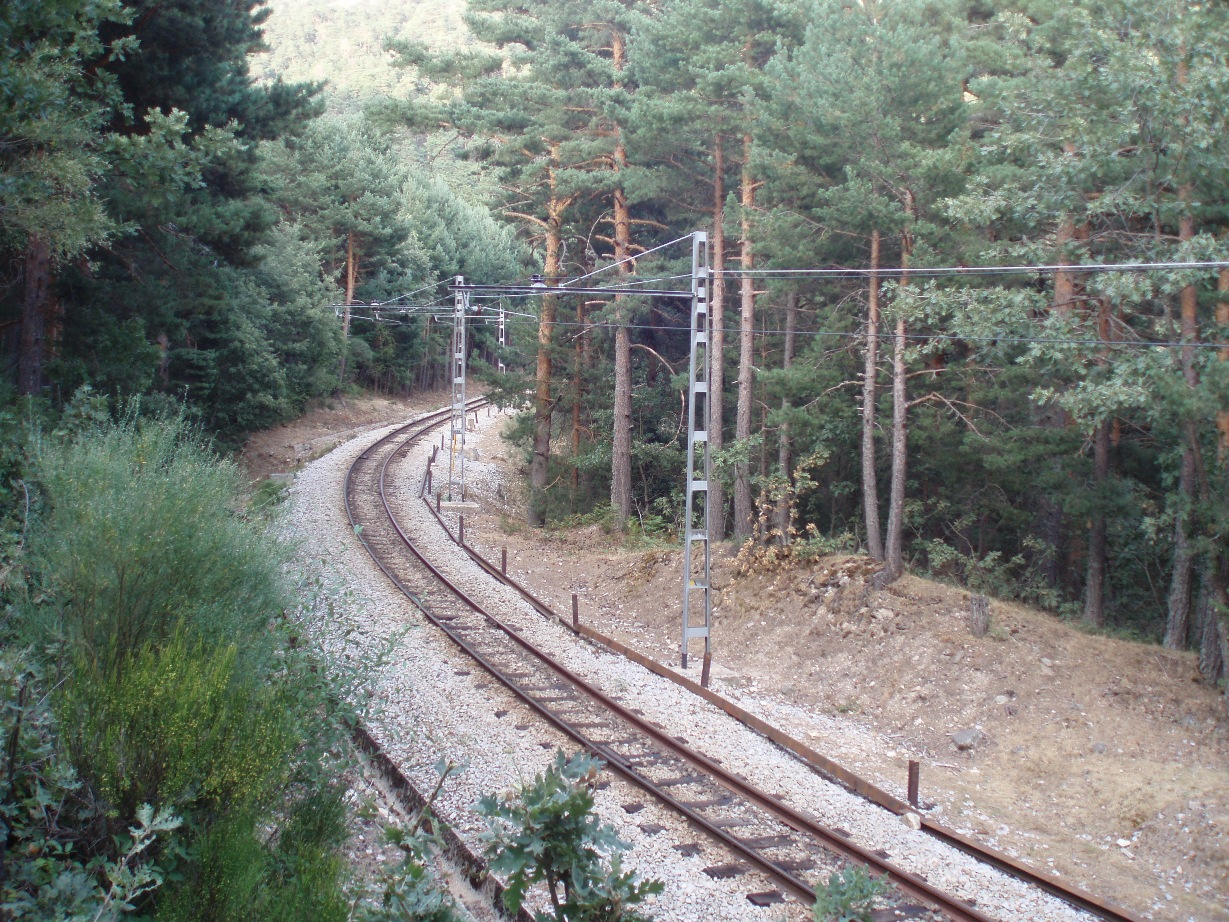
Line C-9 passing through pine forest below Siete Picos
