= The Witching Hour (1985 film) =

1985 film

- Theatrical release poster
- Spanish: La hora bruja
- Directed by: Jaime de Armiñán
- Written by: Jaime de Armiñán
- Starring: Francisco Rabal; Concha Velasco; Victoria Abril; Sancho Gracia
- Cinematography: Teo Escamilla
- Release date: 4 November 1985
- Running time: 105 minutes
- Country: Spain
- Language: Spanish

The Witching Hour (Spanish: La hora bruja) is a 1985 Spanish drama film directed by Jaime de Armiñán. The film was selected as the Spanish entry for the Best Foreign Language Film at the 58th Academy Awards, but was not accepted as a nominee. It is set and was shot in Galicia.

== Cast ==
- Francisco Rabal as César
- Concha Velasco as Pilar
- Victoria Abril as Saga
- Sancho Gracia as Rubén Blázquez y Delgado de Aguilera
- Asunción Balaguer as Monja
- Juan Echanove as Telmo

== See also ==
- List of submissions to the 58th Academy Awards for Best Foreign Language Film
- List of Spanish submissions for the Academy Award for Best Foreign Language Film
