= The House of the Doves =

- Directed by: Claudio Guerin
- Written by: Claudio Guerín; Leonardo Martín; Miguel Rubio; Giovanni Simonelli
- Produced by: Robert Ausnit; Leonardo Martín
- Starring: Ornella Muti; Lucia Bosé; Glen Lee
- Cinematography: Fernando Arribas
- Edited by: Antonio Ramírez de Loaysa
- Music by: Francesco De Masi
- Production companies: International Apollo Films; Star Films
- Distributed by: Mercurio Films
- Release date: 21 February 1972
- Running time: 90 minutes
- Countries: Italy; Spain
- Language: Spanish

The House of the Doves (Spanish: La casa de las palomas, Italian: Un solo grande amore) is a 1972 Italian-Spanish drama film directed by Claudio Guerin and starring Ornella Muti, Lucia Bosé and Glen Lee.

The film's sets were designed by Ramiro Gómez.

== Cast ==
- Ornella Muti as Sandra
- Lucia Bosé as Alexandra
- Glen Lee as Fernando
- Carmen de Lirio as Marilú
- Caterina Boratto as Virginia
- Luis Davila as Enrique
- Blanca Sendino
- Concha Goyanes as María
- Kiti Mánver as Elisa
- Fernando Sánchez Polack as Sirviente de Fernando
- Juana Azorín

== Bibliography ==
- Bentley, Bernard. A Companion to Spanish Cinema. Boydell & Brewer 2008.
