= Elena María Tejeiro =

Spanish actress

- Born: October 25, 1939 (age 86); Murcia, Spain
- Other name: María Elena Mellado del Hoyo
- Occupation: Actress
- Years active: 1959-

Elena María Tejeiro is a Spanish film and television actress.

== Filmography ==
Year	Title	Role	Notes
1959	La vida alrededor		
1961	Usted puede ser un asesino	Julita	
1961	Armas contra la ley		
1961	Y el cuerpo sigue aguantando		
1961	Kilómetro 12		
1961	Historia de un hombre		
1962	Horizontes de luz	Marta	
1962	Tierra de todos	Isabel	Uncredited
1962	The Awful Dr. Orloff	Ursula Camila	
1962	Canción de Juventud	Chica	
1963	Alegre juventud		
1963	La batalla del domingo	Carmen	
1963	Bochorno	Pacita	
1963	The Fair of the Dove		Uncredited
1964	I marziani hanno 12 mani		
1964	Stop at Tenerife		
1964	Los siete bravísimos	Rupe, la chacha	
1965	The Art of Living	Ana	
1965	El mundo sigue		Uncredited
1965	Captain from Toledo	Juana	
1965	La familia y... uno más	Paula	
1965	Aragonese Nobility	Filo	
1966	Lola, espejo oscuro	Lirio	
1966	Four Queens for an Ace	Dancer	Uncredited
1966	The Wild Ones of San Gil Bridge		
1967	Amor a la española	Sofía Esteban	
1969	De Picos Pardos a la ciudad	Elvira	
1969	Amor y medias		
1970	Sin un adiós		
1970	Growing Leg, Diminishing Skirt		
1970	Hembra		
1971	Spaniards in Paris	Dioni	
1971	Rimal min dhahab		
1982	La colmena	Señorita Elvira	
1987	Redondela	Esposa Pena	(final film role)

== Bibliography ==
- Peter Cowie & Derek Elley. World Filmography: 1967. Fairleigh Dickinson University Press, 1977.
