= Luis Rico =

Bolivian singer-songwriter (1945–2026)

- Rico in 2006

Background information
- Born: Luis Rico Arancibia; 15 May 1945; Tupiza, Bolivia
- Died: 2 November 2026 (aged 81) Tupiza, Bolivia
- Occupation: Singer-songwriter
- Instrument: Vocals
- Years active: 1969-2026

Luis Rico Arancibia (15 May 1945 – 2 November 2026) was a Bolivian singer-songwriter.

His songs were considered by many to be rallying cries for unity.

Rico died on 2 November 2026, at the age of 81.

== Albums ==
- Luis Rico (1983)
- Luis Rico (1985)
- El tio (1986)
- Pucha caray ! (1988)
- El ultimo tincu en Paris (1992)
- Luis Rico y su banda (1996)
- Asi se enciende mi amor (1998)
- El mar nuestro de cada dia (1998)
