= 1973 Cannes Film Festival =

- Official poster of the 26th Cannes Film Festival
- Opening film: Godspell
- Closing film: Lady Sings the Blues
- Location: Cannes, France
- Founded: 1946
- Awards: Grand Prix: Scarecrow and The Hireling
- No. of films: 24 (In Competition)
- Festival date: 10 May 1973 – 25 May 1973
- Website: festival-cannes.com/en

Cannes Film Festival
- 1974 1972

The 26th Cannes Film Festival took place from 10 to 25 May 1973. Swedish actress Ingrid Bergman served as jury president for the main competition.

The Grand Prix du Festival International du Film, then the festival's main prize, was jointly awarded to American filmmaker Jerry Schatzberg for Scarecrow and British filmmaker Alan Bridges for The Hireling.

During this edition two new non-competitive sections were added: Étude et documents and Perspectives du Cinéma Français (which was started by the French Film Directors' Society and ran until 1991).

This edition was notorious for the controversy around Alejandro Jodorowsky's The Holy Mountain screening due to the film's depiction of extreme violence. While British documentary Swastika by Philippe Mora caused disturbance among the audience by showing Adolf Hitler's daily and social life.

The festival opened with Godspell by David Greene, and closed with Lady Sings the Blues by Sidney J. Furie.

== Jury ==
=== Main Competition ===
- Ingrid Bergman, Swedish actress - Jury President
- Jean Delannoy, French actor and filmmaker
- Lawrence Durrell, British writer
- Rodolfo Landa, Mexican actor
- Bolesław Michałek, Polish film critic
- François Nourissier, French journalist and writer
- Leo Pestelli, Italian journalist
- Sydney Pollack, American filmmaker
- Robert Rozhdestvensky, Soviet author

=== Short Films Competition ===
- Robert Enrico, French filmmaker - Jury President
- Samuel Lachize, French film critic
- Alexandre Marin

== Official Selection ==
=== In Competition ===
The following feature films competed for the Grand Prix International du Festival:

English title	Original title	Director(s)	Production country
Ana and the Wolves	Ana y los lobos	Carlos Saura	Spain
Belle		André Delvaux	Belgium, France
The Death of a Lumberjack	La Mort d'un bûcheron	Gilles Carle	Canada
The Effect of Gamma Rays on Man-in-the-Moon Marigolds		Paul Newman	United States
Electra Glide in Blue		James William Guercio	United States
Le Far West		Jacques Brel	Belgium, France
Godspell (opening film)		David Greene	United States
La Grande Bouffe		Marco Ferreri	Italy, France
The Hireling		Alan Bridges	United Kingdom
Hospitals: The White Mafia	Bisturi, la mafia bianca	Luigi Zampa	Italy
The Hourglass Sanatorium	Sanatorium Pod Klepsydrą	Wojciech Has	Poland
The Invitation	L'Invitation	Claude Goretta	Switzerland
Jeremy		Arthur Barron	United States
Love and Anarchy	Film d'amore e d'anarchia, ovvero: stamattina alle 10, in via dei Fiori, nella nota casa di tolleranza...	Lina Wertmüller	Italy, France
The Mother and the Whore	La maman et la putain	Jean Eustache	France
Monologue	Монолог	Ilya Averbakh	Soviet Union
O Lucky Man!		Lindsay Anderson	United Kingdom
One Hamlet Less	Un Amleto di meno	Carmelo Bene	Italy
La otra imagen		Antoni Ribas	Spain
Petőfi '73		Ferenc Kardos	Hungary
Scarecrow		Jerry Schatzberg	United States
The Vows	A Promessa	António de Macedo	Portugal
We Want the Colonels	Vogliamo i colonnelli	Mario Monicelli	Italy

=== Out of Competition ===
The following films were selected to be screened out of competition:

- Cries and Whispers (Viskningar och rop) directed by Ingmar Bergman
- Day for Night (La Nuit Américaine) directed by François Truffaut
- A Doll's House directed by Joseph Losey
- Future Shock directed by Alex Grasshoff
- The Holy Mountain directed by Alejandro Jodorowsky
- Lady Sings the Blues directed by Sidney J. Furie
- Lo Païs directed by Gérard Guérin
- Olivier Messiaen et les Oiseaux directed by Michel Fano, Denise Tual
- Picasso, Peintre Du Siècle 1900-1973 directed by Lauro Venturi
- Story of a Love Story (L'Impossible Objet) directed by John Frankenheimer
- Swastika directed by Philippe Mora
- Visions of Eight directed by Miloš Forman, Claude Lelouch, Yuri Ozerov, Mai Zetterling, Kon Ichikawa, John Schlesinger, Arthur Penn, Michael Pfleghar
- Wattstax directed by Mel Stuart
- We Can't Go Home Again directed by Nicholas Ray

=== Short Films Competition ===
The following short films competed for the Short Film Palme d'Or:

- Az 1812-es év by Sándor Reisenbüchler
- Balablok by Břetislav Pojar
- Langage du geste by Kamal El Sheikh
- La Ligne de sceaux by Jean-Paul Torok
- Skagen 1972 by Claus Weeke
- Space Boy by Renate Druks
- La Tête by Emile Bourget

== Parallel sections ==
=== International Critics' Week ===
The following feature films were screened for the 12th International Critics' Week (12e Semaine de la Critique):

- Le Charbonnier by Mohamed Bouamari (Algeria)
- The Water Was So Clear (Gaki zoshi) by Yoichi Takabayashi (Japan)
- Ganja & Hess by Bill Gunn (United States)
- Kashima Paradise by Yann Le Masson, Bénie Deswarte (France)
- Enough Praying (Ya no basta con rezar) by Aldo Francia (Chile)
- Vivre ensemble by Anna Karina (France)
- Non ho tempo by Ansano Giannarelli (Italy)
- Nunta de piatră by Mircea Veroiu, Dan Pita (Romania)

=== Directors' Fortnight ===
The following films were screened for the 1973 Directors' Fortnight (Quinzaine des Réalizateurs):

- Aguirre, the Wrath of God (Aguirre, der Zorn Gottes) by Werner Herzog (West Germany)
- The Sparrow (Al Ousfour) by Youssef Chahine (Egypt)
- All Nudity Shall Be Punished (Toda Nudez Sera Castigada) by Arnaldo Jabor (Brazil)
- Black Holiday (La villeggiatura) by Marco Leto (Italy)
- La città del sole by Gianni Amelio (Italy)
- Coup d'Etat (Kaigenrei) by Yoshishige Yoshida (Japan)
- Days of '36 (Meres tou '36) by Theo Angelopoulos (Greece)
- Desaster by Reinhard Hauff (West Germany)
- Drustvena Igra by Srdjan Karanovic (Yugoslavia)
- El Cambio by Alfredo Joskowicz (Mexico)
- Farlige Kys by Henrik Stangerup (Denmark)
- Hannibal by Xavier Koller (Switzerland)
- History Lessons (Geschichtsunterricht) by Jean-Marie Straub, Danièle Huillet (West Germany)
- Lovely Swine (Bel ordure) by Jean Marboeuf (France)
- Metamorfosis del jefe de la policía política by Helvio Soto (Chile)
- Payday by Daryl Duke (United States)
- Photography (Fotografia) by Pal Zolnay (Hungary)
- Quem é Beta? by Nelson Pereira Dos Santos (Brazil)
- Réjeanne Padovani by Denys Arcand (Canada)
- Some Call It Loving by James B. Harris (United States)
- The Sun Rises Once a Day (Słońce wschodzi raz na dzień) by Henryk Kluba (Poland)
- Touki Bouki by Djibril Diop Mambety (Senegal)
- A Season in the Life of Emmanuel (Une saison dans la vie d'Emmanuel) by Claude Weisz (France)
- La vita in gioco by Gianfranco Mingozzi (Italy)
- Wedding in White by William Fruet (Canada)
- Zwartziek by Jacob Bijl (Netherlands)

Short films

- Ein Leben by Herbert Schramm (West Germany)
- El hombre que va a misa by Bernardo Borenholtz (Argentina)
- Ermitage by Carmelo Bene (Italy)
- Fil a fil by Christian Paureilhe (France)
- Grey City by Farshid Meshgali (Iran)
- Introduction a la musique d'accompagnement by Jean-Marie Straub, Danièle Huillet (West Germany)
- L'audition by Jean-François Dion (France)
- La version originelle by Paul Dopff (France)
- Le lapin chasseur by Thomas Lehestre (France)
- Le soldat et les trois sœurs by Pascal Aubier (France)
- Le travail du comédien by Atahualpa Lichy (France)
- Le ventriloque by Carmelo Bene (Italy)
- Moc by Vlatko Gilic (Yugoslavia)
- Pourquoi by Jean-Denis Berenbaum (France)
- Rendez-vous romantique by Michka Gorki (France)
- Simplexes by Claude Huhardeaux (France)
- Take Off by Gunvor Nelson (United States)
- Zastave by Zoran Jovanovic (Yugoslavia)

== Official Awards ==
=== In Competition ===
- Grand Prix du Festival International du Film:
  - The Hireling by Alan Bridges
  - Scarecrow by Jerry Schatzberg
- Grand Prix Spécial du Jury: The Mother and the Whore by Jean Eustache
- Best Actress: Joanne Woodward for The Effect of Gamma Rays on Man-in-the-Moon Marigolds
- Best Actor: Giancarlo Giannini for Love and Anarchy
- Jury Prize:
  - The Hourglass Sanatorium by Wojciech Has
  - The Invitation by Claude Goretta
- Special Award: Fantastic Planet by René Laloux
- Best First Work: Jeremy by Arthur Barron

=== Short Films Competition ===
- Grand Prix International du Festival: Balablok by Břetislav Pojar
- Prix spécial du Jury: Az 1812-es év by Sándor Reisenbüchler

== Independent Awards ==
=== FIPRESCI Prize ===
- La Grande Bouffe by Marco Ferreri
- The Mother and the Whore by Jean Eustache

=== Commission Supérieure Technique ===
- Technical Grand Prize: Cries and Whispers by Ingmar Bergman

=== OCIC Award ===
- Scarecrow by Jerry Schatzberg

== Media ==
- INA: Opening of the Cannes Film Festival (commentary in French)
- INA: Interview with Jerry Schatzberg for Scarecrow (interview in French and English)
