= La otra imagen =

1973 film

- Directed by: Antoni Ribas
- Written by: Gabriel Moll Blanes; Narcís Comadira; Antoni Ribas; Dolors Oller; Miguel Sanz
- Starring: Asunción Balaguer
- Cinematography: Aurelio G. Larraya
- Release date: 1973
- Running time: 90 minutes
- Country: Spain
- Language: Spanish

La otra imagen is a 1973 Spanish film directed by Antoni Ribas. It was entered into the 1973 Cannes Film Festival.

== Cast ==
- Asunción Balaguer
- Jorge Bofill
- Miquel Bordoy
- Marta Flores
- Fernando García Ulloa
- Antonio Lara
- Julián Mateos
- Jeannine Mestre
- Francisco Rabal
