= Kursaal of Algeciras =

Building in Algeciras, Spain

Coordinates: 36°07′36″N 5°26′40″W

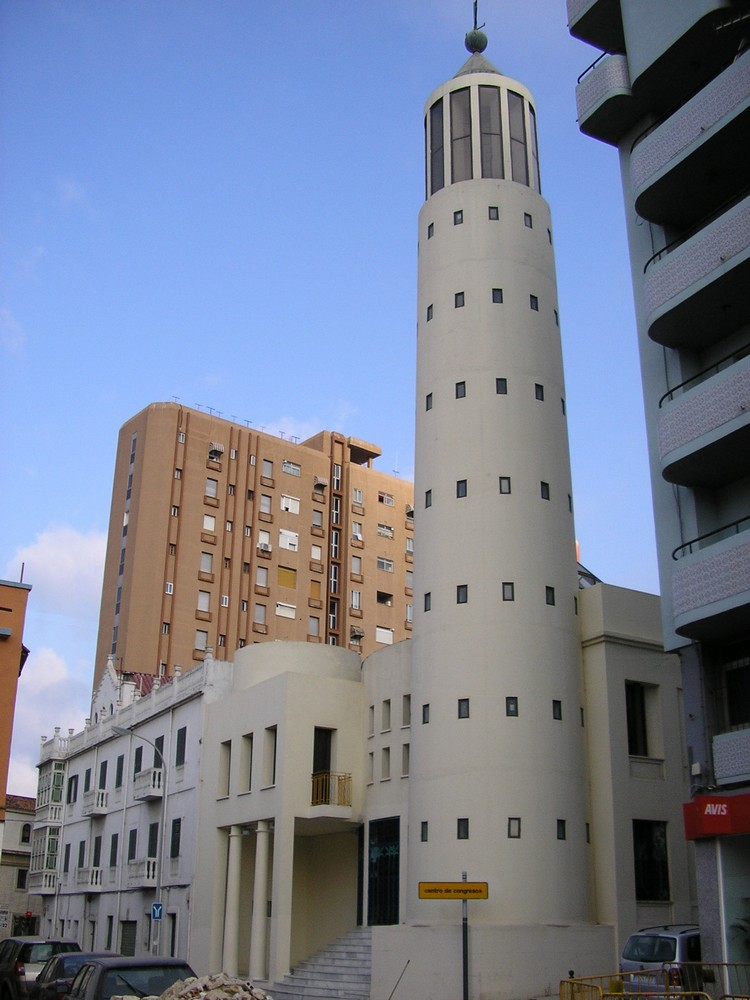
The Kursaal viewed from Avenida Villanueva

The Kursaal of Algeciras is a building in the Paseo del Rio de la Miel of Algeciras, Spain. It is the work of artist Guillermo Pérez Villalta and architect Enrique Salvo. Also known as the Kursaal Congress Centre or Rio de la Miel, it was opened in 2007 after a decade of work. The building was designed in the late nineties as the seat of the Chamber of Commerce of Gibraltar but the work was halted until being rescued by the city council.

The decorative details of Kursaal are largely the strength of the building, and display many mosaics depicting mythological themes of the Strait of Gibraltar area. Its lighthouse tower is accessible by a spiral staircase on the inside. The building contains the main auditorium for the council and a library. The Kursaal has become the permanent centre seat of relations between the Maghreb and the Fundación Dos Orillas (Two Shores Foundation), an agency of the provincial government whose function is to promote relations between the two sides of the Strait of Gibraltar by holding cultural activities.
