= Cercedilla =

- Municipality
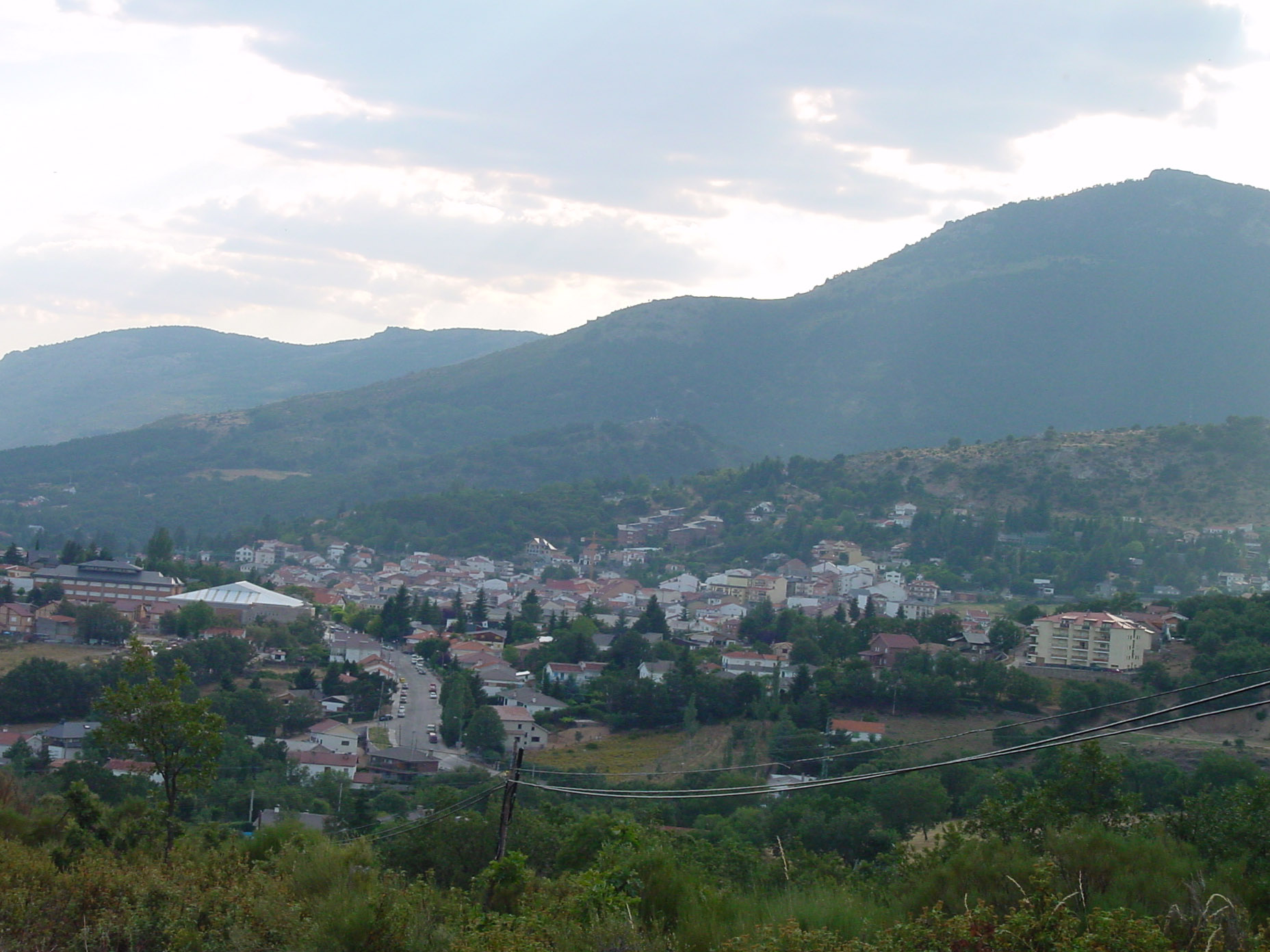

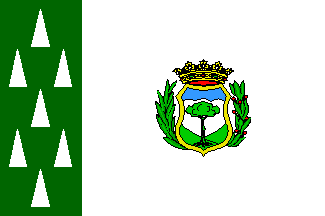
- Flag Coat of arms

- Location of Cercedilla in Madrid

- Location in Spain Cercedilla (Community of Madrid)
- Coordinates: 40°44′28″N 4°3′25″W
- Country: Spain
- Region: Community of Madrid

Government
  - Mayor: Luis Miguel Peña Fernández (2019)

Area
  - Total: 35.8 km^{2} (13.8 sq mi)
- Elevation: 1,214 m (3,983 ft)

Population (2025-01-01)
  - Total: 7,772
  - Density: 217/km^{2} (562/sq mi)
- Demonym: Parraos
- Time zone: UTC+1 (CET)
  - Summer (DST): UTC+2 (CEST)
- Postal code: 28470
- Website: Official website

Cercedilla (Spanish: [θeɾθeˈðiʎa]) is a municipality in the Community of Madrid, in central Spain. It is located in the Sierra de Guadarrama.

== Background ==
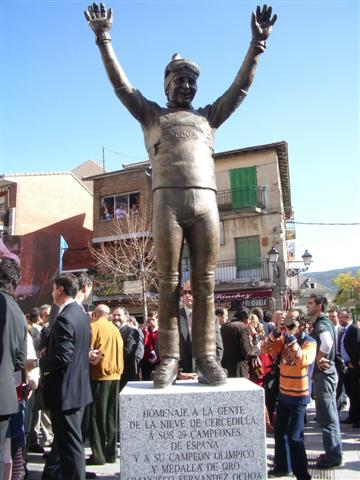
Statue in Cercedilla of Francisco Fernández Ochoa

It was the hometown of Francisco Fernández Ochoa (1950–2006), an alpine ski racer known for being the first Spaniard to win a gold medal at the Winter Olympics. He won the slalom in 1972 in Japan. Less than two weeks before his death from cancer, a statue was erected in his honor in Cercedilla.

Many of his siblings were also on the national ski team; his sister Blanca won an Olympic bronze medal in 1992 in France.

== Public transport ==
=== Bus ===
==== Urban lines ====
- Line 1: Fuenfría hospital - High School

==== Interurban lines ====
- Line 680: Collado Villalba (hospital) - Cercedilla
- Line 684: Madrid (Moncloa) - Cercedilla (by Guadarrama)

=== Train ===
Cercedilla has a train station which gives service to two Cercanías lines, line C-8 and C-9. Line C-8 connects Cercedilla with Madrid, Alcalá de Henares and Guadalajara, while the C-9 line has a more tourist use than commuter use, since it only has two stops, one in Navacerrada and the other in Cotos, located in the Sierra de Guadarrama. In addition, a regional train line leaves from here (although the service is provided with commuter trains) and connects the village of Cercedilla with Segovia.

== See also ==
- C-9 (Cercanías Madrid)
- C-8 (Cercanías Madrid)
