= Herrera, Seville =

Herrera
- Flag Coat of arms

- Map of Spain with Herrera highlighted
- Coordinates: 37°22′N 4°50′W
- Country: Spain
- A. community: Andalusia
- Province: Seville
- Municipality: Herrera

Government
  - Alcalde: Jorge Muriel Jiménez (PP)

Area
  - Total: 53.48 km^{2} (20.65 sq mi)
- Elevation: 254 m (833 ft)

Population (2025-01-01)
  - Total: 6,575
  - Density: 122.03/km^{2} (316.1/sq mi)
- Demonym(s): Herrereños, herrereñas
- Time zone: UTC+1 (CET)
  - Summer (DST): UTC+2 (CEST)
- Website: www.herrera.es/

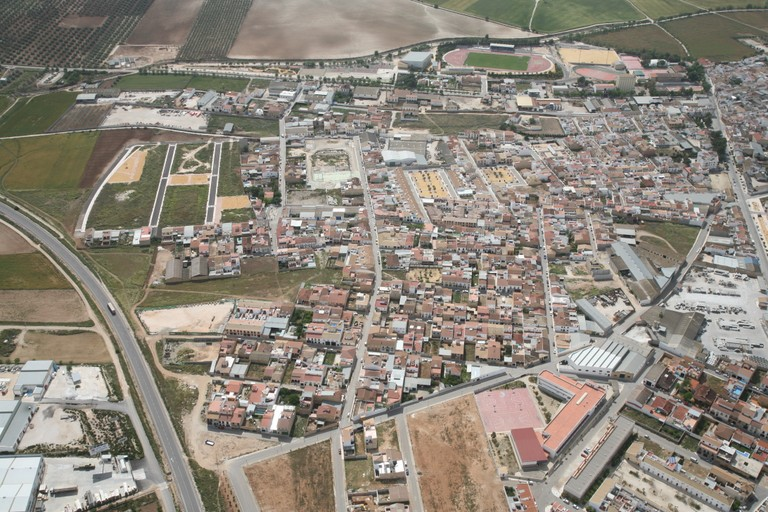
Aerial View of Herrera, Seville

Herrera is a municipality located in the province of Seville, Andalusia. As of 2024, it has a population of 6,573 and covers an area of 53.48 km^{2} (20.65 sq mi). The municipality is situated approximately 120 km (75 mi) from the provincial capital, Seville.

== Name origins and Coat of Arms ==
The town is named after the Spanish word for ironworking, "Herrera", derived from the Latin ferraria. Ironworking is also symbolized in the town's coat of arms, which contains a blacksmith and is inscribed with the Latin motto "Populus natus igne et ferro", which translates to "People born of fire and iron."

== Archaeological sites ==
Ruins of the Muslim and Roman fortifications still exist in the area surrounding Herrera. On the outskirts of the town, there is a Roman archaeological site called "Thermal Set Herrera." It is a large Roman villa where several marble pools, space heating furnaces, and seven large-scale mosaics, including one with a pugilistic scene, have been found. Many paintings and sizable amounts of marble are present. Other former Roman towns are located in Arroyo del Padrón, Noriega, Palominas, and The Farms of Alonso, the latter of which has contained important materials for several centuries. It is in the vicinity of the river Genil (formerly Singilis), whose nearest peak hosts an Arab fortress. A Roman inscription appearing at the end of Herrera mentions Singiliensis pagus or "Genil payment". In total, there are about ninety archaeological fields within the municipality, whose origins range from the Late Bronze Age to the Arab period.

=== Arab Fort of Alhonoz ===
"Alhonoz" comes from Arabic, meaning "the last bastion" or "the final frontier." This name first appears in the administrative divisions that were created by the Muslim rulers of southern Spain, and the first boundary marking conducted between Ecija and Estepa. During the rule of the Emirs, small and medium-sized castles that served as defensive bases for armed patrols guarding the roads leading to Córdoba. These castles were positioned at regular intervals along the roads, securing trade routes in the area. This fortress was connected to The Road of Al-Rasif and other roads that connected Córdoba, Écija, and the Mediterranean coasts.

The Road of Al-Rasif enabled communication with the Strait of Gibraltar and Morocco. It was the main base for Moorish diplomacy because the region had a significant Berber population. The loss of control of the roads by the Emirate of Córdoba came with the Spanish-Berber uprising. Omar Ben Hafsun, a native of the region of Iznate, renounced his Christian beliefs and converted to Islam in an attempt to prevent abuse and persecution by the Arabian authorities.

=== Chapel La Concepción ===
Construction of the chapel began at Plaza Muñoz Olive around 1732. The first Mass was officiated there in 1746, when the chapel was roofed and blessed. By the end of 1749, construction was completed with the addition of a bell tower housing two bells. The project was financed through donations from the people of Herrera. In 1936, the chapel, along with the parish, was looted.

It consists of two small naves covered by a barrel vault. The images venerated include the Sacred Heart of Jesus, Our Lady of Mount Caramel, Our Lady of the Pillar, the Miraculous Virgin, Mary, Help of Christians, Saint Joseph, Saint Rita, and Sweet Name of Jesus, all works in series. Our Lady of Mount Caramel, dated from the 17th century, was brought to Herrera by Don Antonio Tineo Lara. At the base, it reads "Year 1692".

The chalice used in this church was donated by the Countess of Santa Teresa; Dona Teresa Cepeda Mayor. At the foot of the altar under its slab, there is a headstone with the following inscription: "These two graves are of Don Bartolomé García del Campo and Calderon and Ms. Catherine Muñoz Almagro Montero and Noe and their heirs. Dun Mortui Sint. Requiescant In Pace. 1748". Under the pillar of holy water, there is the grave of Isabel Calderon, widow of D. Francisco Lopez Carrillo, who is also buried there, with the inscription: "So that any person who enters, in said church, and steps on my grave, may disperse the holy water. Year of 1770".

In 1929, a clock purchased by the city from the Valencia Brothers Roses house was attached to the bell tower. It was paid in quarterly installments of 750 pesetas for a total price of 6,000 pesetas, with Onsolve Fernando Calvo as the first timekeeper. Previously, there had been another official timekeeper clock within the parish of Santiago, with Bascón Fernando Valdes as its timekeeper until 1909, before he was succeeded by Rafael Carmona Muñoz, who served from 1910 until 1929.

=== Prograsa Chimney ===
Constructed more recently than most of the remaining historical buildings, the Prograsa Chimney was built in 1961. It is 27 meters tall and was constructed using local materials. The bricks were manufactured in the town's tile factories, and the builder, Francisco Muñoz Moreno, known as "Curro Gigante", was a Herrera native. The chimney was originally part of an oil mill owned by Ramón Guillén García, who established the factory years earlier.

It was later acquired by Prograsa, a corporation, and ownership was subsequently transferred to other companies. This factory played a significant role in the local economy, employing more than 200 people.

This building played a crucial role in stabilizing the municipality's population after approximately 3,000 Herrerans emigrated from the area between 1949 and 1960. Today, the area surrounding the chimney is commonly known as "Prograsa," featuring homes, shops, and a park with outdoor activities and entertainment spaces.

== Celebrations ==
=== Carnival ===
Herrera celebrates Carnival. The extensive schedule allows everyone participating to wear their costumes, and Herreran locals congregate on the sidewalks, on balconies, and in windows. Members of "Estudiantina" (a troupe of Herrera) perform their songs, many of which detail happenings that occurred in the town throughout the year.

=== Andalusia Day ===
Andalusia Day is widely celebrated across Andalusia, including Herrera. Local residents gather at the Plaza de Andalucía to partake in the festivities.

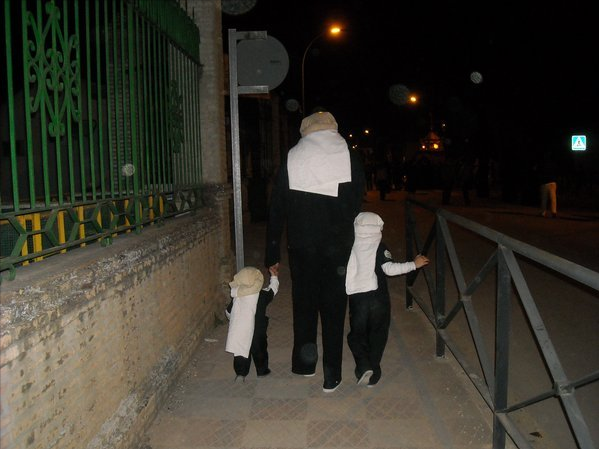
Passion according to Herrererans

=== Holy Week ===
During Semana Santa, Herrera hosts several parades of biblical reenactments, such as the performances of "Arrest", "The Sacrifice of Isaac", "Crossing Spears", and "Three Falls".

=== San Marcos ===
On April 25, during the day of San Marcos, the inhabitants of this town scatter around the city to enjoy a picnic day. On that day people celebrate with "Tie the Devil", a tradition that consists of joining two "jaramagos", a local flower, to symbolize the expulsion of all evil.

=== Pilgrimage in honor of Ntra. Sra. Del Rosario de Fátima ===
The Pilgrimage in Honor of Our Lady of the Rosary of Fatima is an annual religious and cultural celebration held on the second Sunday in May in Herrera. This event combines elements of Catholic devotion with local traditions and festive activities.

The day begins with a procession of approximately one hundred decorated floats converging on the Square of Spain and the town square. Here, participants recite the Rosary, followed by a Mass Rociera, which is attended by a majority of the neighborhood's residents. After the mass, the image of Our Lady of the Rosary of Fatima is placed on a coach to begin its journey to "The Carrizosas" exhibition grounds.

The pilgrimage to "The Carrizosas" involves various modes of transportation:

- Walking pilgrims
- Tractor-towed floats
- Horse-drawn carriages
- Horsemen and horsewomen as escorts
- Private vehicles

An estimated six thousand people gather at the exhibition grounds. The arrival of the Virgin's image is announced by the ringing of bells from a chapel built specifically for this occasion.

At "The Carrizosas", the celebration includes:

- Traditional singing and dancing
- Social gatherings
- Culinary offerings, such as:
  - Gazpacho majao (often prepared traditionally)
  - Picadillo
  - Paella
  - Grilled meats

=== Corpus Christi ===
The Feast of Corpus Christi is held in June. It passes through Roldan Street, decorated for the occasion with Catholic paintings.

=== Verbena de San Juan ===
Held on the penultimate weekend of June (Friday, Saturday, and Sunday), trying to match, if possible, the day of San Juan with any of these. The "Velá de San Juan" was formerly held in the town square with a standalone booth plus several attractions. Public and private booths welcome Herrerans with their "Velá de San Juan". Carriages, horses, attractions, and performances occupy the Booth Hall.

=== Fair of Herrera ===
The end of the fair is always on the second Sunday of August. The Flamenco Festival poster "Pedro de la Timotea" announces the first day of the fair. Over sixty booths, both private and public, are installed to hold the Fair of Herrera.

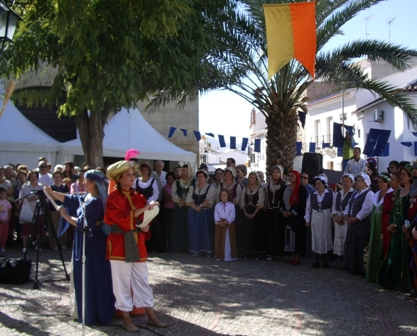
Medieval Market in Herrera

=== Medieval Market ===
The old town (Barribalto) is the stage for a return to the past where Herrerans participate in the October Herrera Medieval Market. Taverns, inns, and craft stalls populate the Parish of Santiago El Mayor and its square.

== Transport ==
Herrera is served by Puente Genil-Herrera railway station, located between Herrera and the neighboring town of Puente Genil, on the AVE high-speed rail line from Madrid to Málaga.

== Sports ==
The sports associations of Herrera include the following:

- Football: C.D.F. Herrera
- Basketball: C.D. Baloncesto Herrera
- Cycling: Club Cicloturista Herrera y Club MTB ``Saltalindes´´
- Archery and Hunting: Club Deportivo de Tiro y Caza con Arco de Herrera
- Track and field: Club Atletismo Herrera
- Triathlon: C.D. Triatlón Herrera

== See also ==
- List of municipalities in Seville
