= José Martín Recuerda =

Spanish dramatist and playwright

José Martín Recuerda (June 17, 1926 – June 8, 2007) was a Spanish dramaturg and playwright.

== Life ==
Recuerda earned bachelor's degrees in philosophy and humanities as well as a masters in Romance Philology from Granada University, and started to exercise his teaching from 1947, primarily in Granada as an assistant professor of Spanish language and literature at the IES Padre Súarez, and later in 1965 in Madrid at the Instituto Ramiro de Maeztu, in Subsidiary no. 11 of Santa Cristina del Hogar del Empleado. In the fifty years following he founded and directed the Teatro Español Universitario of Granada.

== Works ==
- La garduña (1940) unpublished.
- El padre Aníbal (1941) unpublished.
- El enemigo (1943)
- Dauro (1944) unpublished.
- La reina soñada (1945) unpublished.
- Caminos (1945) iunpublished.
- La llanura (1947)
- Los átridas (1951) unpublished.
- El payaso y los pueblos del Sur (1951) unpublished.
- Ella y los barcos (1952) unpublished.
- Las ilusiones de las hermanas viajeras (1955)
- El teatrito de don Ramón (1957)
- Como las secas cañas del camino (1960)
- Las salvajes en Puente San Gil (1961)
- El Cristo (1964)
- ¿Quién quiere una copla del Arcipreste de Hita? (1965)
- El caraqueño (1968)
- Las arrecogías del beaterio de Santa María Egipciaca (1970)
- El engañao (1972)
- Caballos desbocaos (1978)
- Las conversiones (1980)
- Carteles rotos (1983)
- La Troski (1984)
- Amadís de Gaula (1986)
- La Troski se va a las Indias (1987)
- La deuda (1988)
- Las reinas del Paralelo (1991)
- La "Caramba" en la iglesia de San Jerónimo el Real (1993)
- El enamorado (1994). unpublished.
- Los últimos días del escultor de su alma (1995) unpublished.

== Bibliography ==
- Martín Recuerda, José María (1978). Las salvajes en Puente San Gil y Las arrecogías del Beaterio de Santa María Egipciaca. Cathedera Editions (Francisco Ruiz Ramón's Edition).
- Cobo Rivas, Ángel (1998). José María Martín Recuerda: vida y obra dramática. Bank Granada.
- Marchant Rivera, Alicia (1999). Claves de la dramaturgia de José Martín Recuerda. Universidad de Málaga Edition.
- Sanz Villanueva, Santos (2008). Historia de la literatura española 6/2. Literatura actual (6th Edition). Editorial Ariel.
