= Antoni Ribas =

Spanish film director

- Born: 27 October 1935; Barcelona, Catalonia, Spain
- Died: 3 October 2007 (aged 71); Barcelona, Catalonia, Spain
- Occupations: Film director, screenwriter
- Years active: 1966-2007

Antoni Ribas i Piera (27 October 1935 – 3 October 2007) was a Catalan Spanish film director and screenwriter. He directed 15 films between 1966 and 2007. His 1973 film La otra imagen was entered into the 1973 Cannes Film Festival.

== Filmography ==
- Gàbies d'or (2007)
- Centenario (2004)
- Tierra de cañones (1999)
- Dalí (1991)
- El primer torero porno (1986)
- Victòria! 3: El seny i la rauxa (1984)
- Victòria! 2: La disbauxa del 17 (1983)
- Victòria! La gran aventura d'un poble (1983)
- Catalans universals (1980)
- Llibertat d'expressió (1977)
- La ciutat cremada (1976)
- La otra imagen (1973)
- Amor y medias (1969)
- Palabras de amor (1968)
- The Wild Ones of San Gil Bridge (1966)
