= Brazatortas =

Municipality in Ciudad Real province, Spain

Coordinates: 38°39′N 4°17′W

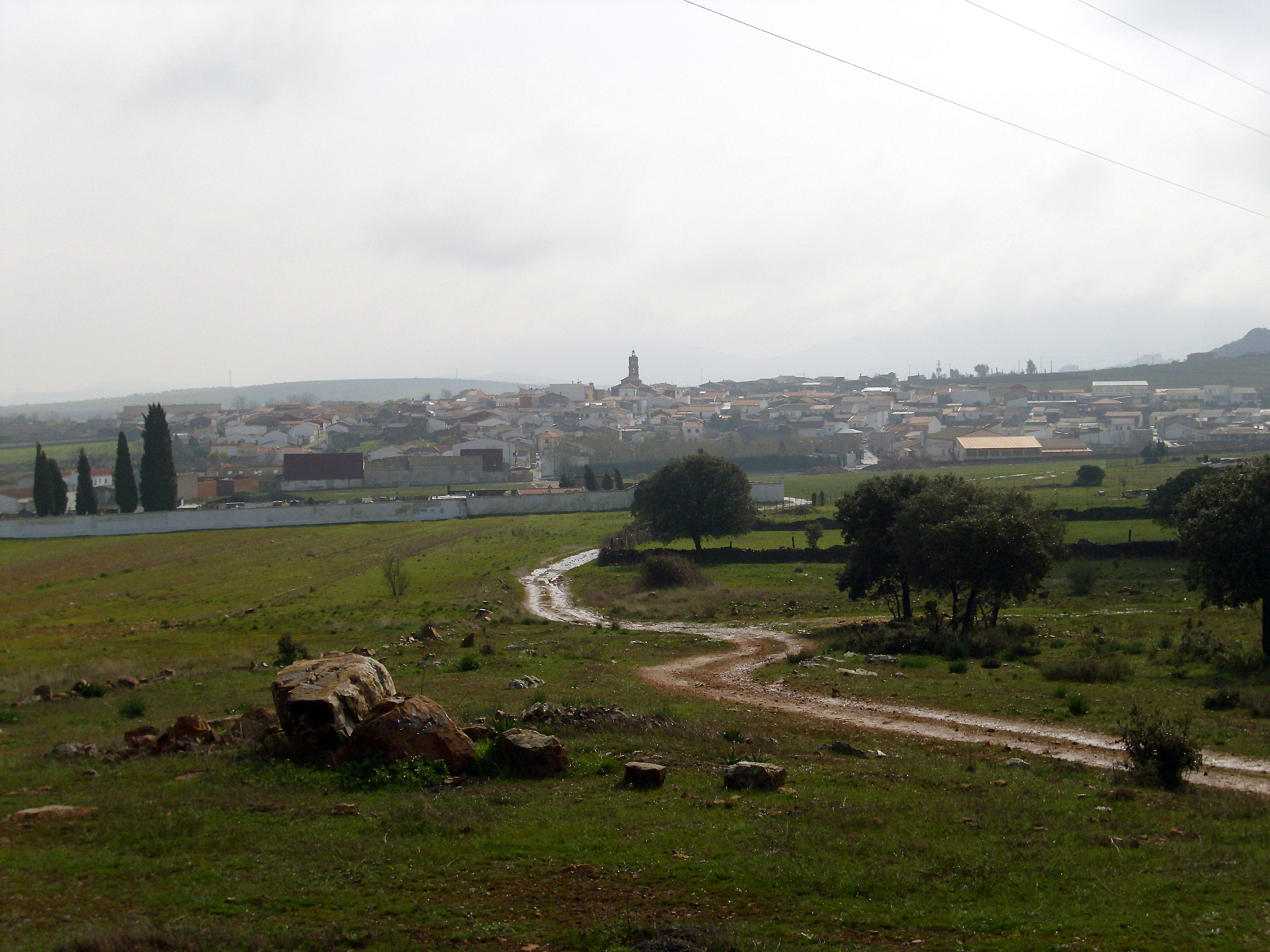
View of Brazatortas, Valle de Alcudia, España

Flag of Brazatortas

Coat of arms of Brazatortas

Brazatortas is a municipality in Ciudad Real, Castile-La Mancha, Spain. In 2021, it had a population of 998.
