= Teo Escamilla =

Spanish cinematographer

- Born: October 23, 1940; Seville, Spain
- Died: December 20, 1997 (aged 57); Havana, Cuba
- Occupation(s): Cinematographer and film director
- Children: 1
- Relatives: Itzan Escamilla (grandson)

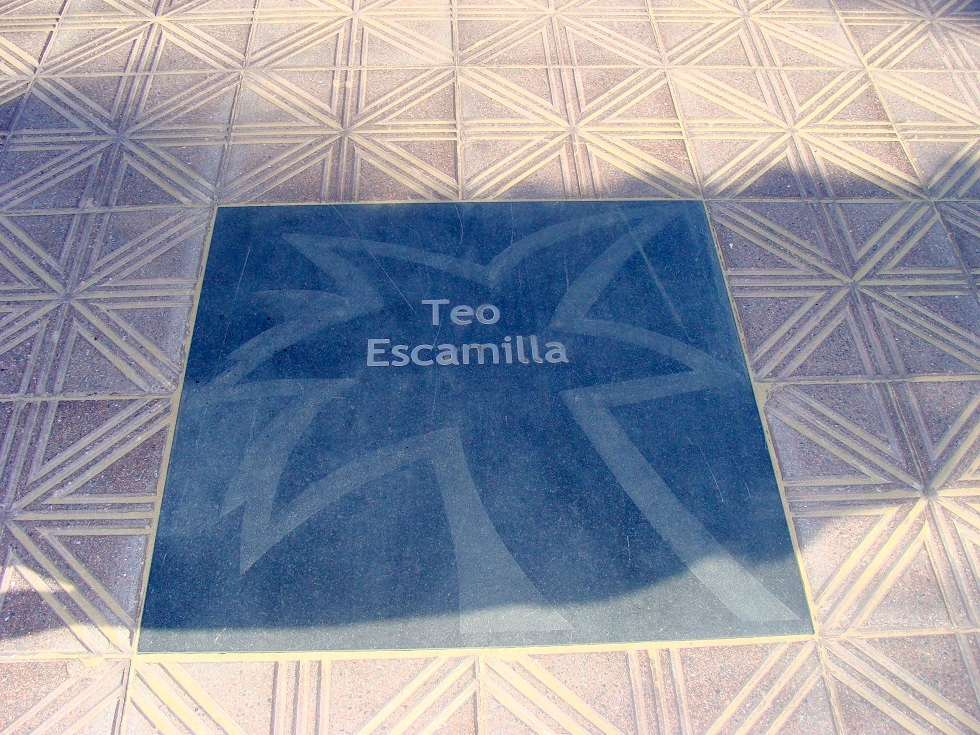

Teodoro Escamilla Serrano (October 23, 1940, in Seville, Spain – December 21, 1997, in Matanzas, Cuba), also known as Teo Escamilla, was a Spanish cinematographer.

== Biography ==
After starting as a second assistant operator or camera operator, he became a cinematographer for fifty-three films, primarily Spanish or in co-production, released between 1974 and 1998.

Teo Escamilla was a frequent collaborator with director Carlos Saura, working as the cinematographer on films such as Cría cuervos (1976, featuring Geraldine Chaplin and Mónica Randall) to The Dark Night (1989, with Juan Diego and Fernando Guillén). His notable works with Saura also include Blood Wedding (1981, with Antonio Gades and Cristina Hoyos) and El amor brujo (1986, also with Antonio Gades and Cristina Hoyos).

Among other directors he collaborated with are Manuel Gutiérrez Aragón (e.g., Heart of the Forest in 1979, starring Ángela Molina) and Jaime de Armiñán (e.g., The Nest in 1980, featuring Ana Torrent).

Throughout his career, Teo Escamilla received five nominations for the Goya Award for Best Cinematography, winning one for the aforementioned L'Amour sorcier.

He was directing a new film, En busca de Cortés, but he died from a heart attack at the age of 57 on 21 December 1997 in Matanzas, Cuba.

== Selected filmography ==
=== Cinematographer ===
==== Director Carlos Saura ====
- 1976: Cría cuervos
- 1977: Elisa, vida mía
- 1978: Los ojos vendados (Blindfolded Eyes)
- 1979: Mamá cumple cien años (Mama Turns 100)
- 1981: Deprisa, deprisa (Hurry, Hurry!)
- 1981: Bodas de sangre (Blood Wedding)
- 1982: Dulces horas (Sweet Hours)
- 1982: Antonieta
- 1983: Carmen
- 1984: Los zancos
- 1986: El amor brujo
- 1988: El Dorado
- 1989: La noche oscura (The Dark Night)

==== Other directors ====
- 1976: La ciutat cremada by Antoni Ribas
- 1977: Nunca es tarde by Jaime de Armiñán
- 1978: Sonámbulos (Sleepwalkers) by Manuel Gutiérrez Aragón
- 1978: Las palabras de Max (What Max Said) by Emilio Martínez Lázaro
- 1979: El corazón del bosque (Heart of the Forest) by Manuel Gutiérrez Aragón
- 1980: El nido (The Nest) by Jaime de Armiñán
- 1981: Maravillas by Manuel Gutiérrez Aragón
- 1982: En septiembre by Jaime de Armiñán
- 1984: Un été d'enfer by Michael Schock
- 1984: Río abajo by José Luis Borau
- 1984: Feroz by Manuel Gutiérrez Aragón
- 1985: Stico by Jaime de Armiñán
- 1985: La hora bruja (The Witching Hour) by Jaime de Armiñán
- 1986: Tata mía (Dear Nanny) by José Luis Borau
- 1987: Mi general by Jaime de Armiñán
- 1988: Berlín Blues by Ricardo Franco
- 1994: Al otro lado del túnel de Jaime de Armiñán
- 1995: El rey del río (King of the River) by Manuel Gutiérrez Aragón
- 1997: Cosas que dejé en La Habana (Things I Left in Havana) by Manuel Gutiérrez Aragón

=== Other functions ===
- 1966: La Caza (The Hunt) by Carlos Saura (cameraman)
- 1967: Peppermint frappé by Carlos Saura (2nd assistant cameraman)
- 1969: La Madriguera (Honeycomb) by Carlos Saura (2nd assistant cameraman)
- 1970: El jardín de las delicias (The Garden of Delights) by Carlos Saura (2nd assistant operator)
- 1973: El espíritu de la colmena (The Spirit of the Beehive) by Victor Erice (cameraman)
- 1973: Ana y los lobos (Anna and the Wolves) by Carlos Saura (2nd assistant cameraman)
- 1974: La prima Angélica (Cousin Angelica) by Carlos Saura (cameraman)
- 1975: Il bianco, il giallo, il nero (The White, the Yellow, and the Black) by Sergio Corbucci (cameraman)

== Awards ==
Goya Award for Best Photography:

- In 1989, for El Dorado and Berlín Blues;
- And in 1990, for La Nuit obscure and Montoyas y Tarantos

1987: Goya award for best photography, for El Amor brujo.
