= Ozores =

Ozores is a Spanish surname. Notable people with the surname include:

- Augusto Ozores (1893–1973), Puerto Rican footballer
- Carlos Ozores (1940–2016), Panamanian politician and diplomat who served as First Vice President of Panama twice
- Mariano Ozores Francés (1890–1976), Spanish actor
  - Mariano Ozores (1926–2025), Spanish film director, screenwriter, and son of the above
  - Jose Luis Ozores (1922–1968), Spanish comic actor and brother of the above
    - Adriana Ozores (born 1959), Spanish theatre, film, television actress, and daughter of the above
  - Antonio Ozores (1928–2010), Spanish actor
    - Emma Ozores (born 1961), Spanish actress and daughter of the above
