= Elisa Montés =

Spanish actress (1934–2024)

- Born: Elisa Rosario Ruiz Penella; 15 December 1934; Granada, Spain
- Died: 9 October 2024 (aged 89); Madrid, Spain
- Occupation: Actress
- Spouse: Antonio Ozores (m. 1960; div. 1968)
- Father: Ramón Ruiz Alonso
- Relatives: Emma Penella (sister); Terele Pávez (sister); Mariano Ozores (brother-in-law); Manuel Penella (grandfather)

Elisa Rosario Ruiz Penella (15 December 1934 – 9 October 2024), known as Elisa Montés, was a Spanish actress who took her pseudonym from the celebrated work of her grandfather, Manuel Penella, El gato montés.

== Life and career ==
Montés was the sister of actresses Emma Penella (1931–2007) and Terele Pávez (1939–2017), daughter of Magdalena Penella Silva and the politician Ramón Ruiz Alonso, and granddaughter and great-granddaughter to composers Manuel Penella Moreno and Manuel Penella Raga. In May 1960, she married actor Antonio Ozores. The daughter of this marriage, Emma Ozores, also pursued an acting career. Montés and Ozores separated in 1968.

On 12 October 2017 she received the ASFAAN award by Alberto Dell'Acqua and Emma Ozores.

Montés died in Madrid on 9 October 2024, at the age of 89.

== Selected filmography ==
- Eleven Pairs of Boots (1954)
- Marta (1955)
- Noi siamo le colonne (1956)
- The Battalion in the Shadows (1957)
- Faustina (1957)
- Gibraltar (1964)
- Django the Condemned (1965)
- Samson and His Mighty Challenge (1965)
- I due toreri (1965)
- Erik, the Viking (1965)
- Texas, Adios (1966)
- Return of the Seven (1966)
- Seven Dollars on the Red (1966)
- Mutiny at Fort Sharpe (1966)
- Maneater of Hydra (1967)
- The Cobra (1967)
- Taste of Vengeance (1968)
- 99 Women (1969)
- The Girl from Rio (1969)
- Captain Apache (1971)
- The Deadly Avenger of Soho (1972)
- Ambitious (1976)

== Awards ==
- Valladolid Festival. Best actress for La vida en un bloc (1956).
- Prize of the Circle of Cinematographic Writers (1955). Best supporting actress for Últimas banderas.
- Prize of the National Syndicate of the Spectacle for Abiciosa (1975).
