= El amor brujo =

Ballet by Manuel de Falla

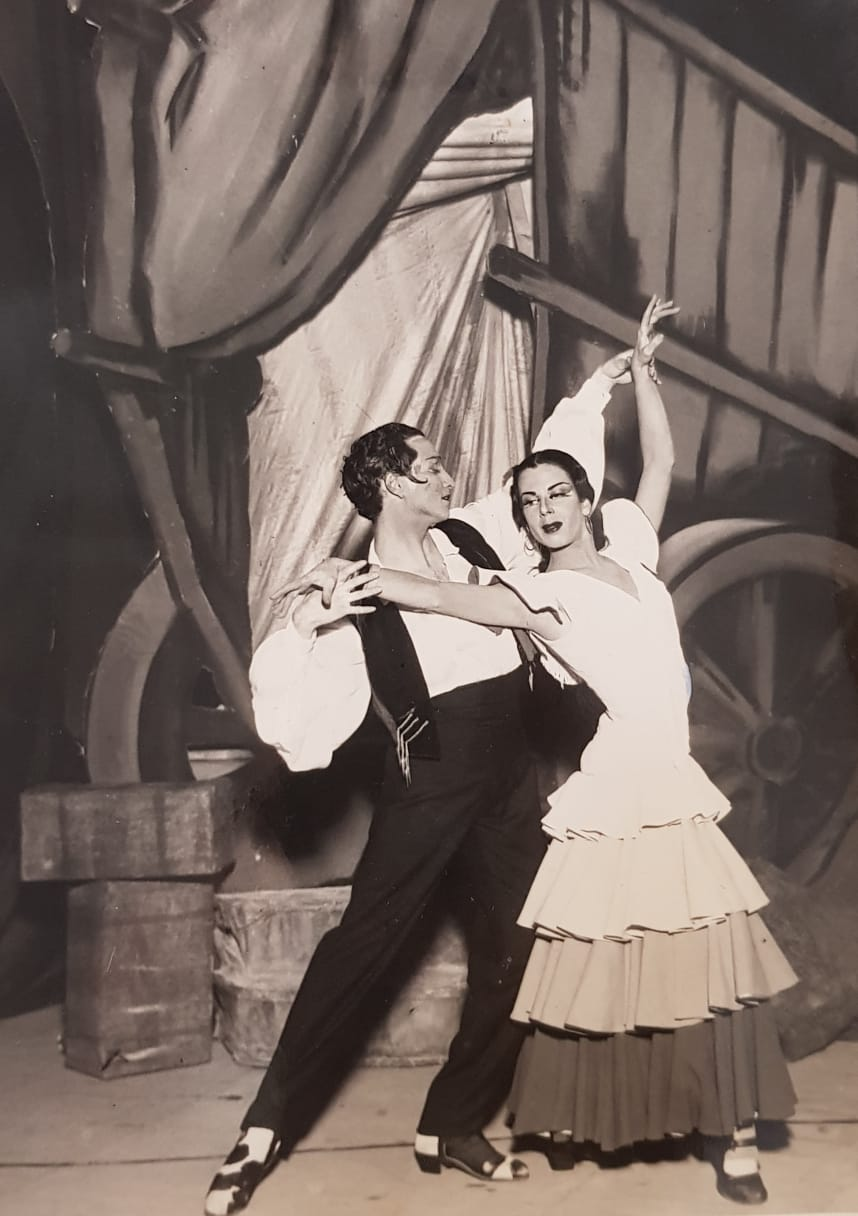
Elsa García Gálvez dancing El amor brujo at the Teatro Argentino de La Plata, 1960

El amor brujo ([el aˈmoɾ ˈbɾu.xo], commonly "Love, the sorcerer" but more accurately “Bewitching Love”) is a ballet by Manuel de Falla. The libretto is by María de la O Lejárraga García, although for years it was attributed to her husband Gregorio Martínez Sierra.

It exists in three versions as well as a piano suite drawn from four of its movements. Andalusian in character, its music includes the celebrated Danza ritual del fuego (Ritual Fire Dance), the Canción del fuego fatuo (Song of the Will-o'-the-Wisp) and the Danza del terror. Its songs are in Andalusian Spanish.

== Versions and performance history ==
=== Gitanería (1915) ===
El amor brujo was commissioned in 1914 as a gitanería, or danced gypsy entertainment, dedicated to the flamenco dancer and cantaora Pastora Imperio. It was finished the next year but its premiere, on 15 April at the Teatro Lara in Madrid, proved unsuccessful. This version, in two scenes, is for dancers and actors and is scored for cantaora voice and chamber ensemble.

=== First revised version (1916) ===
Falla then revised the ballet by removing its spoken dialogue, replacing the cantaora part with three songs for mezzo-soprano and enlarging the accompaniment for sextet and small orchestra. The plot was slightly changed as well. This more concise version, still in two scenes, was played on 12 March 1916 by members of the Madrid Symphony Orchestra under Enrique Fernández Arbós. But it was modified several times, starting the following year when Fernández Arbós proposed a production at the Teatro Real.

=== Ballet pantomímico (1924) ===
By 1924 Falla had evolved El amor brujo into the one-act ballet pantomímico best known today, mainly by enlarging its orchestration. This was published by Chester the next year and first performed in Paris during 1925.

=== Suite of excerpts for piano (1922) ===
Before completing the published ballet, Falla made a suite for piano comprising four of the movements: Pantomima, Danza del terror, Romance del pescador and Danza ritual del fuego. This is G69 in the published works.

== Synopsis ==
El amor brujo is the story of an Andalusian gypsy woman called Candela. Although her affection is for a man named Carmelo, as a girl she was promised to be married to another man (then a boy). After many years Candela's husband has died (at the hands of the husband of a woman named Lucia), but he continues to haunt his wife.

The entire village knows about the haunting, but still brands Candela as crazy because she dances every night with her husband’s ghost ("Danza del terror"). Candela, now a widow, is free to establish a relationship with Carmelo, but continues to be haunted by her husband's ghost.

After a conversation with other women of the village, Candela finally comes to realise that her husband was unfaithful to her, despite all her efforts to make their marriage work; her husband's lover is revealed to have been Lucia.

Candela and Carmelo get advice that a ritual dance is necessary to cast the ghost off ("Danza ritual del fuego"), but it does not work. The ghost is still obsessed with Candela's soul.

Candela manages to trick Lucía to come that night, with the excuse of hooking her up with Carmelo. As she turns up, the nightly ritual of Candela's dance with her husband's ghost begins, but at the last moment Candela moves away from her husband and Lucía is taken away by her now dead lover ("Danza del juego de amor").

Dawn breaks, Candela and Carmelo are now truly free to enjoy their love.

== Movements ==
1. Introducción y escena ('Introduction and scene')
2. En la cueva ('In the cave')
3. Canción del amor dolido ('Song of suffering love')
4. El aparecido (El espectro) ('The apparition')
5. Danza del terror ('Dance of terror')
6. El círculo mágico (Romance del pescador) ('The magic circle')
7. A media noche: los sortilegios
8. Danza ritual del fuego
9. Escena ('Scene')
10. Canción del fuego fatuo ('Song of the will-o'-the-wisp')
11. Pantomima ('Pantomime')
12. Danza del juego de amor ('Dance of the game of love')
13. Final – las campanas del amanecer ('Finale – the bells of sunrise')

== Recordings ==
=== Gitanería (1915) ===
- 1991: Josep Pons with the orchestra of the Teatre Lliure, 'cantaora' Ginesa Ortega. Harmonia Mundi HMC905213

=== Ballet pantomímico (1924) ===
- 1946 (February 5): Fritz Reiner with the Pittsburgh Symphony Orchestra, Contralto Carol Brice. Columbia Masterworks MM-633 (3 12" 78 RPM discs); Also Columbia LP ML-2006.
- 1953: Ataúlfo Argenta with the Orchestre de la Société des Concerts du Conservatoire, mezzo-soprano Ana-Maria Iriarte. EMI 7243 5 69235 2 2
- 1955: Ernest Ansermet with the Orchestre de la Suisse Romande, mezzo-soprano Marina de Gabaráin, Decca 417 691–2
- 1959: Jesus Arambarri conducting Orquesta De Conciertos De Madrid, contralto Inés Rivadeneira
- 1960: Leopold Stokowski with the Philadelphia Orchestra, mezzo-soprano Shirley Verrett-Carter, Columbia MS 6147
- 1961 & 1964: Carlo Maria Giulini with the Philharmonia Orchestra, soprano Victoria de los Ángeles EMI 7 69 037 2
- 1963: Fritz Reiner with the Chicago Symphony Orchestra, soprano Leontyne Price, Mercury
- 1965: Lorin Maazel with the Radio Symphony Orchestra, Berlin, mezzo-soprano Grace Bumbry, Deutsche Grammophone
- 1966: Rafael Frühbeck de Burgos with the New Philharmonia Orchestra, mezzo-soprano Nati Mistral, Decca 417 786–2
- 1978: Luis Antonio Garcia Navarro with the London Symphony Orchestra, mezzo-soprano Teresa Berganza, Deutsche Grammophon 429181-2
- 1983: Charles Dutoit with the Montreal Symphony Orchestra, mezzo-soprano Huguette Tourangeau, London 410 008-2
- 1994: Eduardo Mata with the Simon Bolivar Symphony Orchestra of Venezuela, mezzo-soprano Marta Senn, Dorian
- 1996: Edmon Colomer with the Orquestra Simfònica de Barcelona, 'cantaora' Esperanza Fernández. Valois Auvidis V 4768.

== Films ==
In 1967 Francisco Rovira Beleta directed a film version. It was nominated for the Academy Award for Best Foreign Language Film, but lost to Jiří Menzel's Closely Observed Trains. However, it won the "National Syndicate of Spectacle, Spain" award.

In 1986, Spanish director Carlos Saura directed El amor brujo based on the ballet, starring and choreographed by Antonio Gades. It was the third in his trilogy of dance films, following Bodas de sangre (Blood Wedding) and Carmen. The film filled out the story with spoken dialogue, but nevertheless used the entire score of the ballet, along with additional songs and dances performed by characters in the film. The Orquesta Nacional de España was conducted by Jesús López-Cobos, and the cante jondo singer heard on the soundtrack was Rocío Jurado. A soundtrack album, now out of print, was issued by EMI.

== Music ==
The section "Cancion del Fuego Fatuo" was recorded in 1960 by jazz musician Miles Davis as "Will O' the Wisp" in an arrangement by Gil Evans for their album Sketches of Spain.
