= Emma Ozores =

Spanish actress (born 1961)

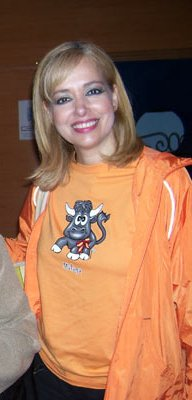
- Ozores in 2009
- Born: Emma Luisa Ozores Ruiz; March 2, 1961 (age 65); Madrid, Spain
- Occupation: Actress
- Years active: 1979–present
- Relatives: Antonio Ozores (father); Elisa Montés (mother); Mariano Ozores (uncle); Adriana Ozores (cousin); Emma Penella (aunt); Terele Pávez (aunt)

Emma Luisa Ozores Ruiz (born 2 March 1961) is a Spanish actress and member of the Ozores theatrical dynasty, best known for her comedic roles in television series such as Farmacia de guardia (1991–1995), La casa de los líos (1996–2000) and Aquí no hay quien viva (2006), and for the stage comedy ¡El último que apague la luz!, written and directed by her father Antonio Ozores.

== Early life and family ==
Ozores was born in Madrid, the only daughter of the comic actor Antonio Ozores (1928–2010) and the actress Elisa Montés (1934–2024). On her father's side she belongs to the Ozores theatrical dynasty: she is the granddaughter of the actors Mariano Ozores Francés and Luisa Puchol, niece of the actor José Luis Ozores and the director Mariano Ozores (1926–2025), and cousin of the actress Adriana Ozores. On her mother's side, she is the niece of the actresses Emma Penella and Terele Pávez, and the granddaughter of the right-wing politician Ramón Ruiz Alonso, one of the men who denounced the poet Federico García Lorca before his execution in 1936.

Her parents married in 1960 and separated about eight years later. After the separation, Ozores was raised by her father, with whom she maintained an especially close relationship throughout his life; she has said that she became an actress because she admired him greatly.

== Career ==
=== Film and television ===
Ozores made her film debut in 1979 in Los energéticos, directed by her uncle Mariano Ozores, and went on to appear in more than ten of his comedies during the late 1970s and early 1980s, mostly popular productions of the cine de destape period.

In 1991, she was cast as Sandra, a young pharmacy assistant, in the Antena 3 sitcom Farmacia de guardia, created by Antonio Mercero. The series ran until December 1995, and its final episode was watched by 11,527,000 viewers with a 62.8% audience share, making it one of the most-watched broadcasts in Spanish television history.

Between 1996 and 2000 she played Elvira opposite Arturo Fernández and Lola Herrera in the Antena 3 sitcom La casa de los líos. In 2006 she joined the fifth and final season of Aquí no hay quien viva as Mamen Heredia, sharing the screen with her aunt Emma Penella, who played the building's caretaker, Concha. Her later screen appearances include the 2010 special La última guardia, based on Farmacia de guardia, and a small role in Santiago Segura's comedy Torrente 4: Lethal Crisis (2011).

In February 2016, Ozores presented the Goya de Honor to her uncle Mariano alongside her cousin Adriana at the 30th Goya Awards ceremony.

=== Theatre ===
In 2007 Ozores starred in the comedy ¡El último que apague la luz!, the last play written and directed by her father, Antonio Ozores. The production opened at the Teatro Apolo in Barcelona, where it had two four-month extensions, and ran for five years at the Teatro Gran Vía Arlequín in Madrid before going on a national tour. After her father's death in 2010, the play was kept as a tribute to him; Ozores has said that before every performance she says quietly to herself "this one's for you, dad". The play won the Premio Nacional a la Mejor Comedia in 2010 and has been performed in more than 500 venues across Spain. In a 2025 interview, Ozores said that comedy written with ingenuity and talent transcends generations.

In August 2023, she played Thalia, the muse of comedy, in El regalo de Zeus, the multidisciplinary production written and co-directed by Concha Rodríguez that closed the 69th edition of the Festival Internacional de Teatro Clásico de Mérida, opposite Juan Meseguer's Zeus.

=== Reality, talent shows and other appearances ===
Ozores won the on-ice version of the celebrity dance competition ¡Mira quién baila! on La 1, ¡Mira quién baila!: Sobre hielo, and was also among the contestants of the regular ballroom edition of the show.

In January 2017 she joined the fifth season of Gran Hermano VIP on Telecinco. Her participation was marked by a controversy when she was caught accessing the internet from a computer inside the house, in breach of the show's rules; the production accepted that the incident had been the result of a technical fault on its side and put her continuation up to a public vote, which she won. She was eliminated in the semi-final on 6 April 2017, finishing as the fifth finalist of the edition. Shortly after, she spoke about her experience on the show in an interview on Telemadrid's programme Madrid Directo.

In March 2026 she returned to Antena 3 as a celebrity guest on the quiz show Pasapalabra, presented by Roberto Leal, in a run of episodes that began on 6 March alongside Javier Pereira, Pablo Puyol and Lucía Gil.

In May 2025, she appeared on Antena 3's programme Y ahora Sonsoles to pay tribute to her father and share memories of her career. She has also given interviews on Onda Cero's podcast Por fin and on other radio and television programmes in which she has discussed her family legacy and her career in comedy.

== Personal life ==
Ozores has kept her private life out of the media. She had a discreet relationship with the actor Nicolás Dueñas, who died in November 2019 and whose funeral she attended.

Her father, Antonio Ozores, died at a Madrid oncology clinic on 12 May 2010 at the age of 81 after a long illness. Her mother, Elisa Montés, died on 8 October 2024 at the age of 89. On 21 May 2025, her uncle Mariano Ozores died at his home in Madrid at the age of 98. Speaking to the press, Ozores said that her uncle had died peacefully in his sleep and praised his legacy as an artist and a person. She recalled that he had given her "all the tools" to do her job in the films they had made together.

== Selected filmography ==
=== Film ===
Year	Title	Role	Director
1979	Los energéticos	Chica	Mariano Ozores
1981	¡Qué gozada de divorcio!	Angelines	Mariano Ozores
1982	El primer divorcio	Monja	Mariano Ozores
1983	El currante	Flora	Mariano Ozores
1983	Los caraduros	Fermina	Antonio Ozores
1987	¡No hija, no!	Ladrona	Mariano Ozores
1990	Pareja enloquecida busca madre de alquiler	Loreto	Mariano Ozores
2010	La última guardia	Sandra	Manuel Estudillo
2011	Torrente 4: Lethal Crisis	Elsa	Santiago Segura

=== Television ===
Year	Title	Role
1989–1990	Brigada Central	Rosi
1991–1995	Farmacia de guardia	Sandra
1991–1993	Un, dos, tres... responda otra vez	Doctora Remedios Ugarte
1994–1996	El sexólogo	Beatriz Acosta
1996–2000	La casa de los líos	Elvira
2004	Diez en Ibiza	Begoña
2006	Aquí no hay quien viva	Mamen Heredia
2016	Centro médico	Carol

=== Reality and talent shows ===
Year	Title	Result
2005	¡Mira quién baila!: Sobre hielo	Winner
2006	¡Mira quién baila!	Contestant
2017	Gran Hermano VIP 5	5th finalist
2021, 2026	Pasapalabra	Celebrity guest
