= Bewitched Love =

- Directed by: Francisco Rovira Beleta
- Written by: José Manuel Caballero Bonald; José Antonio Medrano; Francisco Rovira Beleta
- Cinematography: Francisco Marín; Gábor Pogány
- Edited by: Emilio Rodríguez
- Release date: 14 September 1967
- Running time: 103 minutes
- Country: Spain
- Language: Spanish

Bewitched Love (Spanish: El amor brujo) is a 1967 Spanish drama film directed by Francisco Rovira Beleta and based on the eponymous ballet, a collaboration between the composer Manuel de Falla and the librettist María de la O Lejárraga. The film was nominated for the Academy Award for Best Foreign Language Film. It was also entered into the 5th Moscow International Film Festival.

== Plot ==
Diego (Rafael de Córdoba), is a violent gypsy who supposedly meets his end at the hands of avengers seeking retribution for one of his misdeeds, while Candelas (La Polaca), his former lover, lives consumed by obsession with his memory. His ghost seems to haunt her, entangling her in an inexplicable web of hallucinations. Antonio (Antonio Gades), who is enamored with Candelas, fights to liberate her from this spell and realizes that someone is truly trying to terrorize her. It is at this juncture that Candelas and Antonio resolve to unmask the mastermind behind the scheme, culminating in a climax of dance, conflict, and love.

== Cast ==
- Antonio Gades as Antonio
- La Polaca as Candelas
- Rafael de Córdoba as Diego Sánchez
- Morucha as Lucía
- Nuria Torray as Soledad
- José Manuel Martín as Lorenzo
- Fernando Sánchez Polack as Padre de Candelas

== See also ==
- List of submissions to the 40th Academy Awards for Best Foreign Language Film
- List of Spanish submissions for the Academy Award for Best Foreign Language Film
- El Amor brujo (1986)
