= Manuel Penella =

Spanish composer

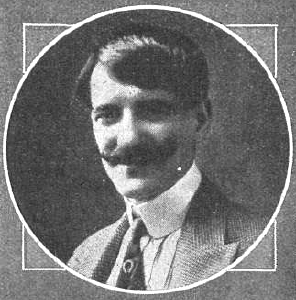
- Manuel Penella Moreno in 1913
- Born: Manuel Penella Moreno; 31 July 1880; Valencia, Spain
- Died: 24 January 1939 (aged 58); Cuernavaca, Mexico

Manuel Penella Moreno (31 July 1880 in Valencia – 14 January 1939 in Cuernavaca) was a Spanish composer. His father was the composer Manuel Penella Raga. His daughter Magdalena Penella Silva married the politician Ramón Ruiz Alonso; through her, he was the grandfather of actresses Emma Penella, Elisa Montés and Terele Pávez.

Although his most popular work at home and abroad is the oft-revived opera española El gato montés (a special favourite of Plácido Domingo, who revived it several times and recorded it for Deutsche Grammophon), several of his other works still enjoy popularity in Spain and the Spanish-speaking world, notably the chamber opera Don Gil de Alcalá (scored in Mexican style for strings and harp), some of his revues and the ambitious, late zarzuela La malquerida (1935), based on the masterpiece by Jacinto Benavente.

== Works (not exhaustive) ==
=== Operas ===
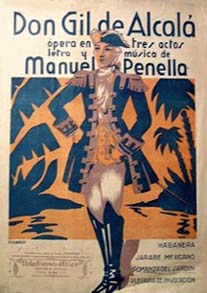
Don Gil de Alcalá (opera, 1932).

- 1893 El queso de bola, sainete lírico, Valencia
- 1906 Las niñas alegres, entremés lírico, Barcelona
- 1907 Amor ciego, zarzuela
- 1907 El dinero, sainete lírico, Barcelona
- 1907 El día de reyes "apropósito en un acto"
- 1908 El padre cura, entremés lírico, Valencia
- 1908 La perra chica, parody of La Patria chica by Ruperto Chapí, Barcelona
- 1908 El arrojado, astracanada
- 1908 Sal de espuma, zarzuela en un acto, Barcelona
- 1908 La tentación, humorada lírica
- 1909 Corpus Christi, drama lírico en un acto
- 1909 Las gafas negras, sainete lírico en un acto
- 1909 La noche de las flores, idilio en un acto
- 1909 Entre chumberas, zarzuela en un acto, Zaragoza
- 1910 La niña mimada, opereta en tres actos
- 1910 Los vencedores, zarzuela en un acto
- 1910 Gracia y justicia, "exposición" en un acto
- 1910 Las romanas caprichosas, opereta en un acto
- 1910 La reina de las tintas, humorada en un acto
- 1911 Huelga de señoras, chirigota en un acto
- 1911 La niña de los besos, opereta en un acto
- 1911 El ciego del barrio, sainete lírico en un acto
- 1911 El viaje de la vida, opereta en un acto
- 1911 El género alegre, humorada lírica en un acto
- 1911 La novela de ahora, aventura en un acto
- 1912 Los pocos años, sainete lírico en un acto
- 1912 Las musas latinas, revista en un acto, Valencia
- 1914 Galope de amor, opereta en un acto
- 1914 La muñeca del amor, capricho en tres actos
- 1914 La isla de los placeres, astracanada en un acto
- 1914 La España de pandereta, españolada en un acto
- 1916 El gato montés, ópera en tres actos, Valencia, Teatro Principal.
- 1917 La última españolada, revista en un acto
- 1917 El amor de los amores, revista en un acto
- 1917 La cara del ministro, zarzuela en un acto, composed in collaboration with Enrique Estela
- 1918 Frivolina, opereta en tres actos
- 1918 El teniente Florisel, vaudeville en tres actos
- 1918 Bohemia dorada zarzuela en tres actos
- 1925 El paraíso perdido, cudro en un acto
- 1926 La última carcelera, zarzuela en dos actos
- 1927 El milagro de San Cornelio, cuento en un acto
- 1927 El espejo de las doncellas, pasatiempo en un acto
- 1927 Entrar por uvas o Feliz año nuevo, lírico en un acto
- 1928 Ris-Ras, humorada en un acto
- 1930 Los pirandones, zarzuela en un acto
- 1930 La reina jamón, zarzuela en dos acteos
- 1930 Me caso en la mar, zarzuela en dos actos
- 1930 La pandilla
- 1931 Ku-Kus-Klan, revista en dos actos
- 1931 ¡Viva la República!, revista en dos actos
- 1931 Don Amancio el Generoso, zarzuela en tres actos, Madrid
- 1931 El huevo de Colón, sainete-vodevil-revista en dos actos
- 1932 Don Gil de Alcalá, ópera en tres actos, Barcelona, Teatro Novedades.
- 1933 Jazz Band, Zarzuela en tres actos, Madrid, Teatro de la Comedia
- 1933 El hermano lobo, zarzuela en tres actos, Barcelona
- 1934 Tana Fedorova, zarzuela en tres actos, Barcelona
- 1934 Curro Gallardo, zarzuela en tres actos, Barcelona
- 1935 La malquerida, zarzuela en tres actos, libretto after the play by Jacinto Benavente, Barcelona, Teatro Victoria.
