= Operation Mata Hari =

1968 film

- Directed by: Mariano Ozores
- Written by: Mariano Ozores
- Starring: Gracita Morales; José Luis López Vázquez; Antonio Ozores
- Cinematography: Vicente Minaya
- Edited by: Rosa G. Salgado
- Music by: José Torregrosa
- Production company: Ízaro Films
- Distributed by: Ízaro Films
- Release date: 14 April 1968
- Running time: 95 minutes
- Country: Spain
- Language: Spanish

Operation Mata Hari (Spanish: Operación Mata Hari) is a 1968 Spanish comedy film directed by Mariano Ozores and starring Gracita Morales, José Luis López Vázquez, and Antonio Ozores. It is based on the story of the activities of the German spy Mata Hari during the First World War.

== Partial cast ==
- Gracita Morales as Guillermina Retuerto Bedoya / False Mata-Hari
- José Luis López Vázquez as Coronel Von Faber
- Antonio Ozores as Willys Overland
- Pilar Velázquez as Paula
- Margot Cottens as Agripina
- José Luis Coll as Vorochenko
- José Sacristán as Jean-Paul
- Pedro Porcel as General Kloch
- María Isbert as Prostitute nº 6
- Paloma Cela as Prostitute nº 3
- Goyo Lebrero as Ally Spy
- Xan das Bolas as waiter at Berlin Cabaret
- Carmen de Lirio as Real Mata-Hari

== Bibliography ==
- Mira, Alberto. The A to Z of Spanish Cinema. Rowman & Littlefield, 2010.
