= Aquí no hay quien viva =

Spanish comedy television series

- Season 3 DVD box art
- Created by: Alberto Caballero; Iñaki Ariztimuño; Laura Caballero
- Starring: María Adánez Malena Alterio Joseba Apaolaza Carmen Balagué Mariví Bilbao Beatriz Carvajal Adrià Collado Cook Gemma Cuervo; Juan Díaz; Elisa Drabben; Eduardo García; José Luis Gil; Eduardo Gómez; Elio González; Daniel Guzmán; Eva Isanta; Loles León; Diego Martín; Luis Merlo; Sofia Nieto; Isabel Ordaz; Guillermo Ortega; Laura Pamplona; Emma Penella; Santiago Ramos; Vanesa Romero; Daniel Rubio; Roberto San Martín; Fernando Tejero
- Country of origin: Spain
- No. of seasons: 5
- No. of episodes: 90

Production
- Running time: 90 minutes approx.
- Production company: Miramón Mendi

Original release
- Network: Antena 3
- Release: 7 September 2003 – 6 July 2006

Aquí no hay quien viva (English: No One Could Live Here) is a Spanish comedy television series focusing on the inhabitants of the fictional building at the address Desengaño 21 in central Madrid. The series debuted on the Antena 3 network in 2003, and was later rerun by the same network as well as cable/satellite channels Neox and Paramount Comedy. Antena 3 Internacional satellite channel broadcasts the series to Latin America. The series debuted in 2003 and became popular thanks to its amusing characters, witty script, and capacity to integrate and poke fun at contemporary issues; the program presents a caustic satire of many of the archetypes found in Spanish society.

In 2006, Antena 3's rival Telecinco acquired a 15% stake in Miramón Mendi, the company that produces the series. Miramón's contract with Antena 3 expired in June 2006 and was not renewed, bringing the series to an end, since the actors' contracts bind them to the production company and not to the network. Miramón Mendi then rebooted the concept for Telecinco with a similar cast, a suburban setting, and brand-new characters and storyline. La que se avecina debuted 22 April 2007. On 15 October 2021, the series was added to Netflix.

== Characters ==
=== Porter's lodge ===
- Emilio Delgado Martín (Fernando Tejero) – The building's porter. He is in his mid-thirties and lives in the porter's lodge with his father, Mariano. He is an unambitious man who just wants to live without worries and have a steady girlfriend. Unluckily, he is in the wrong building for that. He always has a comeback for everything. He was in college for a while, until he got kicked out. He has had three girlfriends so far: Rocío (a mailwoman with a young son whom he almost married), Belén (a complicated relationship where they have broken up and gotten together several times) and Carmen (his college professor). His most well known catchphrase, "un poquito de por favor" (a little bit of please), has quickly become an everyday use idiom around Spain. It has even been parodied in other shows, and not only at the show's own station, Antena 3.
- Mariano Delgado (Eduardo Gómez) – Emilio's father, though not exactly a model one. He is separated from Emilio's mother and, since he has no place to live, he made himself one with his son. He has a lot of nerve, is a womanizer without much luck, and is always concocting one money scheme or another. It won't be the first time Emilio has kicked him out, but he always takes him back. His catchphrase is ignorante de la vida, criticizing the younger generation for being ignorant about life. He enjoys a brief career as a comedian with his performance being called Crónicas Marianas, "The Mariano Chronicles", a reference to the Spanish late-night TV show Crónicas Marcianas. In spite of his unstylish look, he considers himself a metrosexual, much to the amusement of his neighbours and son.

=== 1-A ===
Radiopatio (roughly translated into "gossip yard") headquarters, as they call their "gossip agency", home of three old ladies nicknamed las Supernenas (The Powerpuff Girls), las tres mellizas (The Triplets), and las brujas de Eastwick (The Witches of Eastwick), among others. Their common hobbies are gossip, bingo and shoplifting.

- Vicenta Benito Valbuena (Gemma Cuervo) – Lives in flat 1-A. She's a retired woman that has never married and who's still a virgin. She's really naive (to the point that she seems dumb) and polite but also very optimistic. Her dog Valentin is the most important thing for her. Alongside her sister Marisa and her friend Concha, they're the source of all gossiping in the building. She's got a crush on Andrés. When Marisa's husband gets back they end up together to everyone's amazement. She is still waiting for her true love. At first it seems that she is silly but in fact is very clever when she wants.
- Maria Luisa "Marisa" Benito Valbuena (Mariví Bilbao) – Vicenta's older sister. After her husband Manolo left her, Vicenta took her in her home. She's the polar opposite of her sister, a harsh, ironic chain-smoker, "chinchón" (anisette)-drinking who always speaks her mind. She would like to retire to Benidorm with a handsome German. Alongside her sister and her friend Concha, they like to spy on others in the building and spread gossip. Marisa is often seen smoking and carries a large bottle of Chinchón liquor in her purse and wearing teen clothes.
- Concepción "Concha" de la Fuente García (Emma Penella) – In the first season, she lives in flat 2-B with her son Armando and her grandson Dani. Afterwards, they move out and she sells the flat to the Guerra family. But her son puts her in a retirement home because the woman he moved in with doesn't like her, which angers Concha. She went to live with her friends Vicenta and Marisa. She still has another flat in the building, which she rents to Belén without a contract. In later seasons, she decides to sell it, and Belén buys it using a plot that Concha doesn't like one bit.

=== 1-B ===
- Mauricio "Mauri" Hidalgo Torres (Luis Merlo) – A gay journalist who used to work for a Cosmopolitan-type magazine. He's unstable, hypochondriac, has many obsessions and he's pretty insecure. Mauri frequently finds himself not sure as to whether or not his potential love's interests are gay. During the first season, he lived with his boyfriend Fernando, but he left to work in London. Later he had a son, Ezequiel, by artificial insemination with his lesbian roommate Bea. He also had an affair with Lucia's brother Diego, which ended when Diego got involved with Abel, his baby son's nanny. Fernando has since returned and they're living together again. Recently, Mauri decided to write a book at Fernando's urging and his own lack of fulfillment with his career. After suffering from severe writer's block, he was helped by Mariano to write an action novel featuring a truck driver who is struck by lightning and gains precognition powers. Although he found the story ridiculous, he went with the idea. The book became a best-seller.
- Fernando Navarro Sánchez (Adrià Collado) – Mauri's lawyer boyfriend during season 1. After he lost his job when he came out, he got a very good job offer at London and finally decided to take it. They did the long-distance relationship thing for a while, but they finally broke up as friends. He has since returned and, after a bit of fumbling, he and Mauri are living together again. He has decided to start his own practice, and him and Mauri have just married.

=== 2-A ===
- Juan Cuesta (José Luis Gil) – A middle-aged high school teacher and long time homeowners council president, a position that defines who he is. He's a very grey man, completely controlled by his wife, he's a born worrier and nobody respects him. But, as president of this building, he always sees himself in the middle of some big messy affairs. He's married to Paloma, until she ends up in coma. He then starts an affair with his new neighbour, Isabel and, after a spectacular coming out, they move in together. He has divorced his wife, but has not yet married Isabel. He lost his job and his position as strata council president in later seasons, and with them his purpose in life. He has since then found a new job and recovered the strata council presidency.
- Natalia Cuesta (Sofía Nieto) – Juan and Paloma's teen daughter. She's got a lot more freedom since her mother is in coma. She's had several boyfriends, among them Pablo, with whom she lived under her aunt's roof for a while. She moved out to live on her own, but soon returned and she's now studying psychology. She got pregnant as a surrogate mother for a couple that soon backed out of the deal; she still carries on with her pregnancy. She has started a relationship with Yago.
- José Miguel "Josemi" Cuesta (Eduardo García Martínez) – Juan and Paloma's son, who is in his early teens. A lazy but gifted boy, always quick to take advantage of opportunities. José Miguel has the IQ of a genius, and was offered a chance to study abroad in Canada, but opted to stay in Spain. He's in love with Candela, in 2-B.
- Isabel Ruiz (Isabel Ordaz) – Called La Hierbas (herb-woman or "pot head") by her neighbours, she moves in with her family after buying flat 2-B from Concha. A neurotic hypochondriac with a laisser-faire attitude, she's big time into natural therapy, herbal remedies and yoga. After her husband gets jailed, she starts an affair with Juan, which eventually leads to the end of her marriage. She moves in with Juan and his children and eventually sells her flat. After Juan loses his job, she is forced to return to work as a nurse, to her chagrin.
- Yago (Roberto San Martin) – Nicknamed el Sabrosón (the babbler) by the neighbours, is Lucía's Cuban ex-boyfriend, whom she met while on holidays when she was still engaged to Carlos. He's an ecology nut, very active in his NGO Aldeas Verdes (Green Villages) and Lucía adopts his principles to get along with him. They've had several crisis when he caught her with Carlos and Roberto. After she leaves for Somalia, he moves into the attic and starts a relationship with Natalia. He now lives with her in the 2-A.

=== 2-B ===
- Higinio (Ricardo Arroyo) – used to be building's plumber and building worker until he bought the 2-B flat from Carlos. He's a laid-back man, who doesn't want problems in life. He started renovating 2-A, but then his wife Mamen got angry at them and told him to stop. He now has to work secretly at night.
- Mamen (Emma Ozores) – Higinio's wife. She likes to have all perfect at home. She is angry with Cuesta family because their son Josemi touched Candela's breast while she was sleeping.
- Candela (Denise Maestre) – Called Candy-Candy by their neighbours. Higinio and Mamen's 14-year-old daughter. She's interested in Pablo, who treats her like a child.
- Raquel (Elena Lombao) – Mamen's sister, a female-identifying transgender. Her brother in law Higinio insists on calling her Raúl, her birth name. She briefly dated Emilio, but he wasn't able to get over the fact she has male genitalia.
- Moncho (Pablo Chiapella) – Higinio and Mamen's oldest son, who has just returned home after his business venture collapsed.

=== 3-A ===
The former home of Lucía, who now has moved to Somalia (see former characters below). It still belongs to her, and her father lived there for a while with his butler and cook while he's having his house refurbished. Natalia and Yago have rented it while the 2-A is undergoing renovations.

=== 3-B ===
- Belén López Vázquez (Malena Alterio) – She's nicknamed la Golfa (the Tart) by her landlady. She rents flat 3-B from Concha, without a contract (a fact she reminds her landlady often). Harsh and fussy, she's very bitter because of her lack of success with men. She doesn't have a steady job and has worked in a lot of occupations (waitress in a burger restaurant and in Lucia's restaurant, receptionist in an undertakers, shop assistant and parking meter controller, among others). She eventually gets together with Emilio, to the point of living together, but they finally break up. Since then, they have broken up and gotten together again several times, including an affair while he was dating Carmen. She had a one night stand with Roberto. She just got a mortgage to buy the flat from Concha. She was also Paco's girlfriend, but not for a long time.
- Beatriz 'Bea' Villarejo (Eva Isanta) – Mauri's lesbian roommate and best friend. She moved in with Mauri after breaking-up with her girlfriend Inés, when Mauri was looking for a roommate after Fernando left. She's a veterinarian, open, optimistic and sure of herself. She wanted to have a child and asked Mauri to be sperm donor. He wasn't supposed to get involved with raising the child, but finally he did and in a big way. For a while, she dated lesbian lawyer Rosa, but the relationship ended when she made Bea choose between her and Mauri after her son, Ezequiel, was born. After Fernando returned, she moved to 2-B with her new friend Carmen. Later, she lived in 3-B with Belén and Ana, her new girlfriend.
- Ana 'Inga' (Vanesa Romero) – Nicknamed Inga or la Sirenita (The Little Mermaid) by the neighbours, she's a very beautiful air hostess who, after a passionate night with Bea, ends up accepting she's a lesbian and they become a couple. She sporadically works as a model, which makes Bea rather jealous of other men looking at her love interest.
- Maria Jesús Vázquez (Beatriz Carvajal) – Belen's mother, she's nicknamed la Torrijas by the neighbours. She moves in with her when he leaves her husband. She's manipulative and dominant. She has started a relationship with Rafael (see below).

=== Top-floor residents ===
- Pablo Guerra (Elio González) – Isabel and Andrés' youngest son. After his parents' marriage breaks up, he sticks with his father. For a while, he dates and lives with Natalia in Nieves' flat. He moved with his mother after his father left. He dated Marta for a while, but they broke up when she made him choose between her and his friendship with Paco. The two friends now live together on the top floor.
- Francisco (Paco) (Guillermo Ortega) – The videoshop assistant. A self-proclaimed film lover, Paco has a collection of weird quirks and kinks. He's still a virgin (despite his friends attempts to find a woman to deflower him) because he wants his first time to be with a woman he loves. He finally finds a girlfriend at Diego and Abel's wedding and he gets very upset when his friends joke about the fact she's not very pretty. They finally get married, but soon thereafter they start having serious problems. Separated from his wife, he has now moved to the top floor apartment with his friend Pablo. He has started relationship with Belen but they split up.

=== Non-resident characters ===
- Rafael Álvarez (Nicolás Dueñas) – Lucías father, who, after his daughter leaves, moved temporarily into her flat with his butler and cook while he was having his house refurbished. The wealthy owner of a speculative construction company, completely amoral and willing to do anything for money, he tried to buy the building several times, including setting fire to it.
- Marta (Assumpta Serna) – The president of the building on the opposite side of the road. She's nicknamed pantumaca due to her strong Catalan accent. Divorced for several years, she falls in love with Juan Cuesta, who hesitates between her and La hierbas. After being rejected by Juan she attempts suicide on New Year's Eve but finally accepts her rejection and develops an ambiguous friendship with her rival, since every advice she gives her results in trouble and crisis for the couple. She dated Isabel's youngest son Pablo for a while, until she made him choose between her and his friendship with Paco. She lost.
- José María (Nacho Guerreros) – A former drug addict, who still has mental problems due to that, who becomes friends with Emilio and the videoclub gang. He lives with his aunt Choni.
- Father Miguel (Manuel Millán) – The neighbourhood priest. Ready for everything, he has been able to marry, confess and baptise characters of both sexes and all sexual orientations (as long as they don't tell the bishop). He's a singer (and a very bad one at that), always trying to sell people his singles, usually Catholic covers of hit Spanish songs.

=== Former characters ===
- Paloma Hurtado (Loles León) – Juan's wife for 18 years. A very controlling woman with an acerbic tongue. She ended up in coma after falling down the interior courtyard from her window while fighting with Isabel. She finally got out of her coma, only to be run over with a car by Isabel. She was in coma for a long time, until she died. The day she was cremated Juan discovered that she cheated with a vacuum cleaner seller.
  The reason for Loles León's character death was because the actress asked for a pay rise, since the show was getting good ratings, but the producing company didn't consent, so her character was put into coma until the discussion was solved. While in coma, Paloma appeared a few times on the show, but since Loles wasn't working with them due to the salary problem, her face was never shown, always being facing away or just her legs. When Loles lost her case with the company and decided to sign off, Paloma's death was produced.
- Armando (Joseba Apaolaza) – Concha's son. After the first season, he moved away to live in a house with his new girlfriend and tried, unsuccessfully, to put his mother in a retirement home. Fernando being a closeted homosexual, he and Mauri tried to fend off the building suspicions about them being gay by befriending Armando, inviting him over to watch football matches and other considered manly things. Unluckily for them, it was all worthless, since Armando leaves their home (after the match finished) by saying "I thought you gay people were a bit more tactful", after Mauri and Fernando behaved like the stereotypical "macho".
- Alex Guerra (Juan Díaz) – Isabel and Andrés' eldest son. When the family starts family therapy to try to save the marriage, Isabel confesses Alex is the product of a pre-marriage affair with a Polish man named Jaroslav. When Isabel moves in with Juan, he goes to live with them and gets along very well with his new family. He left the series to find his real father in Poland.
- Nieves Cuesta (Carmen Balagué) – Nicknamed la Chunga by the neighbours, she is Juan's unmarried sister. She moved in with him (without asking him first) after Paloma's accident to help him. Unlike her brother, she has a strong character and wants things done her way. She has some money, but she is stingy. She has a fallout with her brother over his relationship with Isabel and, after some trouble, ends up buying Isabel's flat and starting a relationship with her former husband Andrés, trying by all means to get back at her brother. When things between Andrés and her fall through, she moves away, leaving her brother in charge of renting (and later, selling) the flat.
- Roberto Alonso (Daniel Guzmán) – Lucía's boyfriend. He's an architect, but works drawing erotic comics. He's brilliant, but he has no ambitions and he's lazy. After his relationship with Lucía ends, he moves to the building's attic and tries to get her back several times. After finally giving up, he now lives in 2-B with his ex-rival turned friend Carlos, trying to get him over his depression. He finally moves away to Puerto Banús to continue with his profitable business of drawing caricatures.
- Carlos (Diego Martín) – Lucía's childhood friend. A rich kid like her, he lives off his family's money. Carlos is very unsure of himself, and ends up doing wacky, impulsive things, such as pretending to be gay and trying to start a relationship with Mauri. He's been after Lucia since forever, but she never wanted to date him. He helps her with her restaurant business, and gets infatuated with Alicia. Eventually, Carlos buys the video shop in the ground floor and ousts Juan as building president, gaining popular support by paying for a new elevator and spa in the attic. In a New Year's Eve party, he has a drunken one-night stand with Alba, and she becomes pregnant with his daughter, whom he agrees to support. After much trouble, Lucía finally gives him a chance, but it doesn't last long. Totally depressed, he agrees to share a flat with Roberto, but he can't get over the depression, and checks himself into a depression clinic, selling both the flat and the videoclub.
- Lucía Álvarez (María Adánez) – Called La Pija (the posh). The daughter of the wealthy owner of a construction company, Lucía arrives at the building to live with her boyfriend Roberto. She works in her father's company and she's used to good clothes and the finer things. Eventually, her relationship with Roberto falls through and she decides to quit her father's company and do things by herself. She tries opening a restaurant, but it doesn't work. She goes through some difficult times after she refuses her father's money, but things start to get better once she gives her old boyfriend Carlos another chance. But things fall through quickly. She finds a new boyfriend in Yago, an ecology nut whose principles she adopts to get along with him. In the end, however, she believes in them more than he does and leaves with an NGO to Somalia. As Marisa puts it, her appearance is always neat and stylish, which is emphasised by the catchphrase "qué mona va esta chica siempre" (how well-groomed is always this girl).
- Andrés Guerra (Santiago Ramos) – Isabel's husband. A middle-aged businessman of doubtful reputation, he has to sell his house after some trouble with the Treasury and he moves with his family to 2-B. He has a sports shop Deportes Guerra and he's always into doubtful business affairs. Eventually he's jailed, but he's able to get out when Vicenta pays his bond. But she has a crush on him, and he has to play along so she wouldn't retire the bond money. He suspects his wife is having an affair for a while, but he doesn't know with whom until she tells him in a very inappropriate moment. He later starts a relationship with Nieves which falls through fast. For a while he lives alone in the attic, turning increasingly bitter, with an apparent Diogenes syndrome. He enjoys a brief relationship with Carmen. Finally, after a freak accident, he ends up with amnesia, and Vicenta tries to make him think that they are married. When he realises that he doesn't have anything left for him at Calle Desengaño 21, he leaves the building and leaves the show for good.
- Alicia Sanz (Laura Pamplona) – Belen's roommate. A would-be actress, Alicia is vain, selfish, completely without tact and not above rubbing her success with men in her less successful flatmate Belen's face. She goes through men like shoes, never falling in love with one. She toys with Carlos for a while, getting expensive gifts from him but never giving him anything in return. Occasionally (very occasionally) a bit of friendly generosity comes through. After Emilio moves up with Belén, they quarrel and Alicia moves in with a now single Lucía. After a while, she and Belén patch things through and she returns to 3-B. Eventually, Alicia finally falls in love with a man, Ricardo, and moves to New York City with him.
- Carmen Villanueva (Llum Barrera) – A college professor, and the daughter of the vice-chancellor, she meets Emilio when he attends one of her classes and they start a relationship. Carmen knows what she wants and she's very sure of herself, but she has some insane tendencies. After she and Emilio break up, she moves in with Belén to try to recover him, up to the point to calling up her former crazy boyfriend to make him jealous, but it doesn't work. She later rents 2-B from Nieves, and Bea moves in with her. She has a crush on Fernando, even after Bea tells her he's gay, and tries to seduce him, but he flees away scared. She lived at 3-B with Bea, Belén and Inga for a while, but finally moved back with her parents.
- Salvador Villarejo (Jordi Sánchez) - A Catholic priest and Bea's brother. He appeared briefly in season 2, before starting a trip to Third World countries as a missionary.
- Diego Álvarez (Mariano Alameda) – Lucia's younger brother. Recently married to Alba, he meets Mauri at his sister's restaurant opening, and they start an affair. He divorces and moves in with him, but their affair ends when he falls for Abel, the male nanny of Mauri's son Ezequiel. Mauri gets angry and tries to prevent their wedding, but finally he marries Abel, being the first gay married couple in Spain. But soon thereafter, he admits he has made an error, that it was too soon and that he misses Mauri. But Mauri's former boyfriend Fernando (who turns out to be a former college classmate of his) has since then returned.
- Alba (Marta Belenguer) – Diego's not completely sane wife. Jealous and insecure, she gets the shock of her life when she learns her husband is having an affair with another man. After they divorce, she has a one-night affair with Carlos, and she's now pregnant with his child.
- Rosa Izquierdo (María Almudéver) – Bea's girlfriend in season 3. A strong-willed lawyer that originally was hired by Bea's former employer against her but who chose to become her lawyer instead. The two of them soon became a couple, but Rosa and Mauri never got along. In the end, they break up when Bea chooses to go with Mauri to Diego and Abel's wedding (to give him emotional support) instead of going with Rosa to meet her family.

== Episodes ==
=== 1st season ===
- Episode 1: Érase una mudanza (Once upon a moving)
- Episode 2: Érase una reforma (Once upon a renovation)
- Episode 3: Érase el reciclaje (Once upon a recycling)
- Episode 4: Érase un rumor (Once upon a rumor)
- Episode 5: Érase un niño (Once upon a baby)
- Episode 6: Érase un resbalón (Once upon a drop off)
- Episode 7: Érase una rata (Once upon a rat)
- Episode 8: Érase un indigente (Once upon a beggar)
- Episode 9: Érase una de miedo (Once upon a scary movie)
- Episode 10: Érase un dilema (Once upon a dilemma)
- Episode 11: Érase un traspaso (Once upon a handover)
- Episode 12: Érase un sustituto (Once upon a substitute)
- Episode 13: Érase una fiesta (Once upon a party)
- Episode 14: Érase una avería (Once upon a breakdown)
- Episode 15: Érase un anillo (Once upon a ring)
- Episode 16: Érase una Nochebuena (Once upon a Christmas Eve)
- Episode 17: Érase un fin de año (Once upon a New Year Eve)

=== 2nd season ===
- Episode 18: Érase una derrama (Once upon an apportionment)
- Episode 19: Érase un sueño erótico (Once upon an erotic dream)
- Episode 20: Érase un negocio (Once upon a business)
- Episode 21: Érase un desafío (Once upon a challenge)
- Episode 22: Érase una patrulla ciudadana (Once upon a civic patrol)
- Episode 23: Érase un rastrillo (Once upon a street market)
- Episode 24: Érase una huelga (Once upon a strike)
- Episode 25: Érase un piso en venta (Once upon a flat on sale)
- Episode 26: Érase una parabólica (Once upon a satellite dish)
- Episode 27: Érase un video casero (Once upon a home-made video)
- Episode 28: Érase unas elecciones (Once upon an election)
- Episode 29: Érase una despedida de soltero (Once upon a stag night)
- Episode 30: Érase una boda (Once upon a wedding)
- Episode 31: Érase un apoyo vecinal (Once upon a neighborhood support)

=== 3rd season ===
- Episode 32: Érase un caos (Once upon a chaos)
- Episode 33: Érase un okupa (Once upon a squatter)
- Episode 34: Érase un matrimonio de conveniencia (Once upon a convenience marriage)
- Episode 35: Érase una inauguración (Once upon an inauguration)
- Episode 36: Érase un combate (Once upon a fight)
- Episode 37: Érase un canario (Once upon a canary)
- Episode 38: Érase un mal de ojo (Once upon an evil eye)
- Episode 39: Érase un famoso (Once upon a celebrity)
- Episode 40: Érase un desalojo (Once upon an eviction)
- Episode 41: Érase un belén (Once upon a nativity scene)
- Episode 42: Érase una Nochevieja (Once upon a New Year's Eve)
- Episode 43: Érase una grieta (Once upon a crack)
- Episode 44: Érase unos nuevos inquilinos (Once upon new tenants)
- Episode 45: Érase un bautizo (Once upon a christening)
- Episode 46: Érase una academia (Once upon an academy)
- Episode 47: Érase unos estatutos (Once upon some statutes)
- Episode 48: Érase unas alumnas (Once upon some female students)
- Episode 49: Érase un juicio (Once upon a trial)
- Episode 50: Érase un disco-pub videoclub (Once upon a disco-pub videoshop)
- Episode 51: Érase un cobaya (Once upon a guinea pig)
- Episode 52: Érase un premio (Once upon a prize)
- Episode 53: Érase unas puertas blindadas (Once upon some security doors)
- Episode 54: Érase un vicio (Once upon a vice)
- Episode 55: Érase un administrador (Once upon an administrator)
- Episode 56: Érase un traición (Once upon a treason)
- Episode 57: Érase el primer presidente gay (Once upon the first gay president)
- Episode 58: Érase una tragaperras (Once upon a slot machine)
- Episode 59: Érase un desgobierno (Once upon a misgovern)
- Episode 60: Érase un regalo de boda (Once upon a wedding present)
- Episode 61: Érase otra boda (Once upon another wedding)
- Episode 62: Érase una luna de miel (Once upon a honeymoon)
- Episode 63: Érase un cirujano plástico (Once upon a plastic surgeon)
- Episode 64: Érase unas vacaciones (Once upon some holidays)

=== 4th season ===
- Episode 65: Érase un despertar (Once upon a wakeup)
- Episode 66: Érase un cultivo (Once upon a crop)
- Episode 67: Érase un desvío provisional (Once upon a provisional detour)
- Episode 68: Érase una sequía (Once upon a drought)
- Episode 69: Érase un banco en la acera (Once upon a bench in the sidewalk)
- Episode 70: Érase una Navidad convulsa (Once upon a convulsed Christmas)
- Episode 71: Érase la tercera Nochevieja (Once upon the third New Year's Eve)
- Episode 72: Érase unos propósitos de Año Nuevo (Once upon some New Year resolutions)
- Episode 73: Érase una presidenta títere (Once upon a puppet president)
- Episode 74: Érase un par de bodas (Once upon a pair of weddings)
- Episode 75: Érase una conexión Wifi (Once upon a Wifi connection)
- Episode 76: Érase un vudú (Once upon a voodoo)
- Episode 77: Érase un día de San Valentín (Once upon a Saint Valentine's Day)
- Episode 78: Érase una nueva vida (Once upon a new life)

=== 5th season ===
- Episode 79: Érase una extradición (Once upon an extradition)
- Episode 80: Érase un colapso (Once upon a collapse)
- Episode 81: Érase un robot de cocina (Once upon a kitchen robot)
- Episode 82: Érase un presidente de vacaciones (Once upon a president on holidays)
- Episode 83: Érase un anuncio (Once upon an advertisement)
- Episode 84: Érase un billete de 50 euros (Once upon a 50 euro bill)
- Episode 85: Érase un escándalo (Once upon a scandal)
- Episode 86: Érase un descubrimiento macabro (Once upon a macabre discovery)
- Episode 87: Érase una emisora pirata (Once upon a pirate radio)
- Episode 88: Érase un funeral con sorpresa (Once upon a funeral with surprise)
- Episode 89: Érase una lista de boda (Once upon a bridal registry)
- Episode 90: Érase un paripé (Once upon an act)
- Episode 91: Érase un adios (Once upon a good-bye)

== Catchphrases ==
=== Porter ===
- Emilio
  - ¡Un poquito de por favor! (A little bit of please!)
  - ¡Cipote! (Cock!)
  - Apaguen los teléfonos móviles y no fumen, para hablar levantan la mano y para insultar también me la levantan (Please turn off your mobile telephones and do not smoke. To speak, raise your hand and to insult, raise your hand too.)
  - ¡Papá, cómete el kiwi! (Dad, eat your kiwi!)
- Mariano
  - Tú... ignorante de la vida (You... know nothing about life.")
  - Mariano Delgado, metrosexual y pensador (Mariano Delgado, metrosexual and thinker)

=== 1-A ===
- Vicenta
  - A Marisa le dejó Manolo (Marisa was dumped by Manolo)
- Marisa
  - ¡Qué mona va esta chica siempre! (This girl always looks so cute! – referring to Lucía)
  - ¡Radio Patio, 24 horas! (Radio Patio, 24 hours!)
  - ¡Movida! (Action!)
  - ¡Y a éste ¿qué le importa lo que hizo Manolo?! (What does he care about what Manolo did?!)
  - ¡¿Por qué siempre me tienes que meter a Manolo en todas partes?! (Why do you always have to mention Manolo?!)
- Concha
  - Váyase Señor Cuesta... ¡Váyase! (Leave Mr. Cuesta—Leave now! – paraphrasing a famous phrase former Prime Minister José María Aznar said to then Prime Minister Felipe González)
  - ¡Chorizo! (Thief!)
  - ¡Qué vergüenza! (How shameful!)

=== 1-B ===
- Mauri
  - ¡Envidia de pene! (Penis envy! – especially to Rosa)
  - Este también es gay (This one is gay too.)

=== 2-A ===
- Juan
  - ¡Qué follón! (What a bloody mess!)
  - Soy Juan Cuesta, presidente de la comunidad (I'm Juan Cuesta, President of the community)
  - ¡Lo digo sin acritud pero lo digo! (I'm saying it without acrimony, but I do say it)
- Paloma
  - ¡(Algo) aquí no, eh Juan, (algo) aquí no! (No [something] here, eh Juan, no [something] here!)
  - ¡Hombre ya! (No way!)
  - ¡Y punto en Boca, Y punto en Boca! (And that's it. period!)
- Jose Miguel
  - "Bueno, Pero Tranquilita eh!!" (Ok, but take it easy)

=== 2-B ===
- Roberto
  - Vamos no me jodas... (Come on, don't screw with me...)

== International remakes ==
=== Portugal – Aqui não há quem viva ===
The series has the same setting and plots, though the names of most of the characters change. Features Portuguese actors.

=== France – Faites comme chez vous ===
The script is the same but the actors and the building are changed. The title means Make yourselves at home.

=== Serbia – Moje drage komšije ===
Broadcast started on Studio B on 29 April 2011. Translated Moje drage komšije (My Beloved Neighbors). The show replaced Los Hombres de Paco. It was previously aired in its entirety on the B92 network.

=== Bosnia and Herzegovina – Moje drage komšije ===
NTV Hayat and ATV - Mreza plus. Broadcast started on 22. February 2010. Broadcast of the show started for a second time on 4 July 2011.

=== Greece – Η Πολυκατοικία ===
Premiered on Mega Channel on 6 October 2008 and ran for three seasons until 2011. The first 90 episodes are based on the original Spanish script, whereas the rest 42 episodes consist of original Greek scenario, followed by new or returning plotlines and additional original characters.

=== Mexico – Vecinos ===
The show portrays the same kind of characters, living all together in a building. It was adapted for the Mexican audience and ran between 2005 and 2006 on the Televisa network, achieving huge success. Currently shows on reruns.

=== Italy – Qui non si può vivere ===
The same setting and presumably the same characters. There are few news updates on this version, and it's only known that the first season will be composed by 26 episodes of 50 minutes each.

=== Argentina – Aquí no hay quien viva ===
The script is similar but the actors and the building were changed. However, it didn't have as much success as it had in Spain, partially because of the schedule problems that Telefé was having, so production of this version stopped.

=== Colombia – Aquí no hay quien viva ===
The script, the setting and the plots are the same with some little changes (though the names of most characters were changed). Features Colombian actors. RCN bought the rights to make a local adaptation, which began airing on 25 August 2008 but ended on 27 February 2009 despite the success it was having.

=== Finland – Naapureina Madridissa ===
On Yle TV1. Translated Naapureina Madridissa ("As Neighbours in Madrid"). The broadcasting of the show started on 25 May 2010.

=== Bulgaria – Щурите съседи ===
Localized as Щурите съседи ("The Crazy Neighbours"). The Spanish show has been broadcast (with Bulgarian voice-over) multiple times in the country since 2010. The latest broadcasting of the show started on 15 March 2018.

=== United States – I Hate This Place ===
American television network ABC announced that it would produce an American version of the series, that would be named I Hate This Place. Craig Doyle would be responsible for the series' first scripts; Ben Silverman and Sofía Vergara would direct. Filming was due to start in early 2011, but no news has come of this project since.

== Awards ==
- Fotogramas de Plata: Best Actor (Fernando Tejero) (2005), Best Actress (Loles León) (2004)
- ATV Award: Best Actor (Luis Merlo, 2005), Best Actress (Malena Alterio, 2005), Best Screenplay (2005), Best Fiction Program (2005).
- TP de Oro: Best National Series (2005), Best Actor (Fernando Tejero, 2005).
- Ondas Award: Best Series (2004), tied with Los Serrano.
