= Honorary Goya Award =

Annual award by the Spanish Film Academy

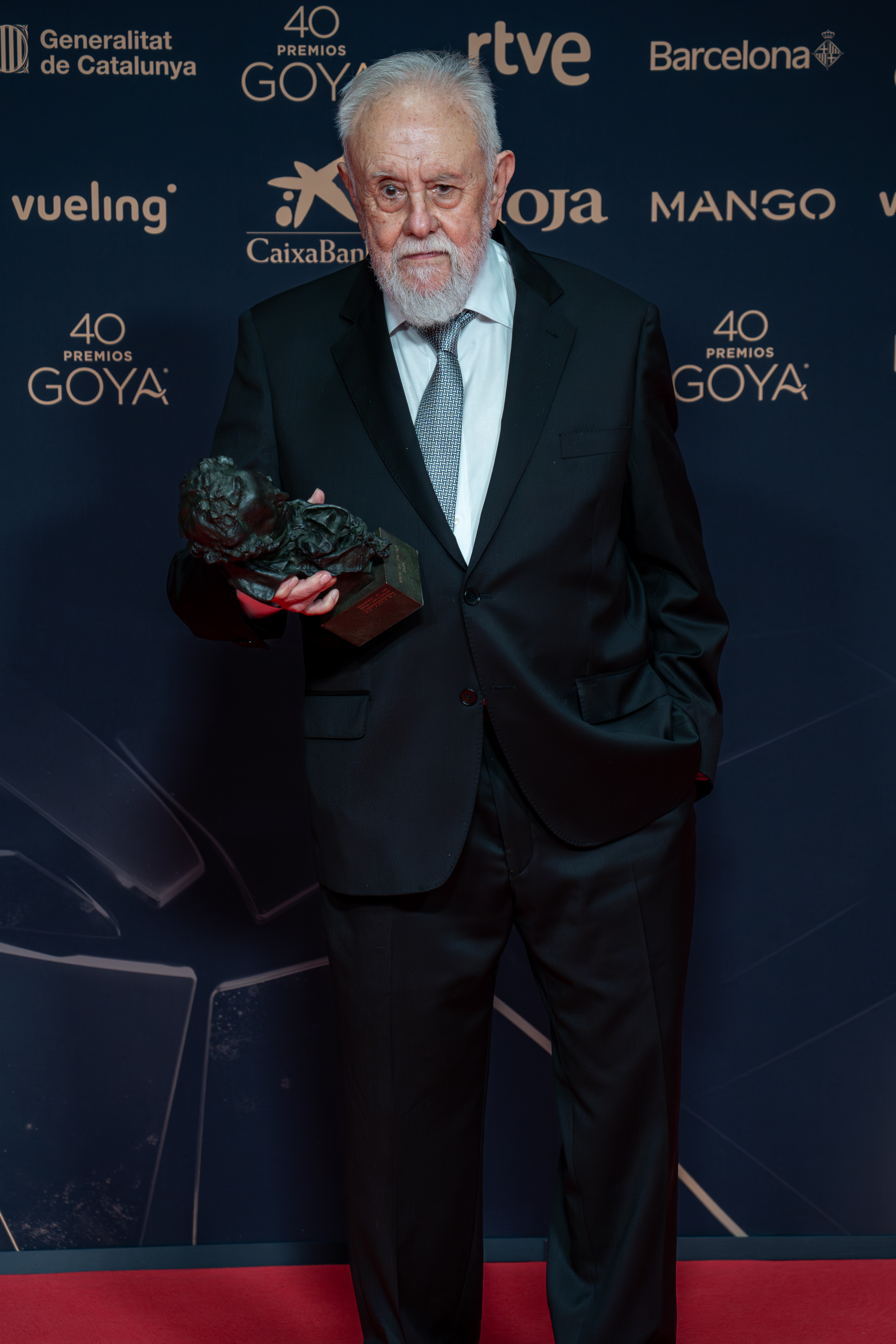
- The 2026 recipient: Gonzalo Suárez
- Native name: Premio Goya de Honor
- Awarded for: Lifetime achievement
- Country: Spain
- Presented by: Academy of Cinematographic Arts and Sciences of Spain (AACCE)
- First award: 1st Goya Awards
- Most recent winner: Gonzalo Suárez (2026)
- Website: Official website

The Honorary Goya Award (Spanish: Premio Goya de Honor) is one of the Goya Awards presented annually by the Academy of Cinematographic Arts and Sciences of Spain (AACCE) since the awards debuted. It is a non-competitive award and it is awarded for extraordinary distinction in lifetime achievement in Spanish cinema.

== Honorees ==
=== 1980s ===
Year	Recipient	Profession
1987 (1st)	José F. Aguayo	Cinematographer
1988 (2nd)	Rafaela Aparicio	Actress
1989 (3rd)	Imperio Argentina	Actress and singer

=== 1990s ===
Year	Recipient	Profession
1990 (4th)	Victoriano López García	Film professor and producer
1991 (5th)	Enrique Alarcón	Art director and set decorator
1992 (6th)	Emiliano Piedra	Producer
1993 (7th)	Manuel Mur Oti	Screenwriter and filmmaker
1994 (8th)	Tony Leblanc	Actor, filmmaker and comedian
1995 (9th)	José María Forqué	Screenwriter and filmmaker
1996 (10th)	Federico Gutiérrez-Larraya	Cinematographer
1997 (11th)	Miguel Picazo	Filmmaker, screenwriter and actor
1998 (12th)	Rafael Azcona	Screenwriter and novelist
1999 (13th)	Rafael Alonso	Actor

=== 2000s ===
Year	Recipient	Profession
2000 (14th)	Antonio Isasi-Isasmendi	Filmmaker and producer
2001 (15th)	José Luis Dibildos	Producer and screenwriter
2002 (16th)	Juan Antonio Bardem	Filmmaker and screenwriter
2003 (17th)	Manuel Alexandre	Actor
2004 (18th)	Héctor Alterio	Actor
2005 (19th)	José Luis López Vázquez	Actor
2006 (20th)	Pedro Masó	Filmmaker, producer and screenwriter
2007 (21st)	Tedy Villalba	Producer
2008 (22nd)	Alfredo Landa	Actor
2009 (23rd)	Jesús Franco	Filmmaker, producer and actor

=== 2010s ===
Year	Recipient	Profession
2010 (24th)	Antonio Mercero	Filmmaker and screenwriter
2011 (25th)	Mario Camus	Filmmaker and screenwriter
2012 (26th)	Josefina Molina	Filmmaker and screenwriter
2013 (27th)	Concha Velasco	Actress and singer
2014 (28th)	Jaime de Armiñán	Filmmaker and screenwriter
2015 (29th)	Antonio Banderas	Actor and filmmaker
2016 (30th)	Mariano Ozores	Filmmaker and screenwriter
2017 (31st)	Ana Belén	Actress and singer
2018 (32nd)	Marisa Paredes	Actress
2019 (33rd)	Narciso Ibáñez Serrador	Filmmaker, actor and screenwriter

=== 2020s ===
Year	Recipient	Profession
2020 (34th)	Pepa Flores	Singer and actress
2021 (35th)	Ángela Molina	Actress
2022 (36th)	José Sacristán	Actor
2023 (37th)	Carlos Saura	Filmmaker, screenwriter and photographer
2024 (38th)	Juan Mariné	Cinematographer and film restorer
2025 (39th)	Aitana Sánchez-Gijón	Actress
2026 (40th)	Gonzalo Suárez	Filmmaker, screenwriter and novelist

== Gallery ==
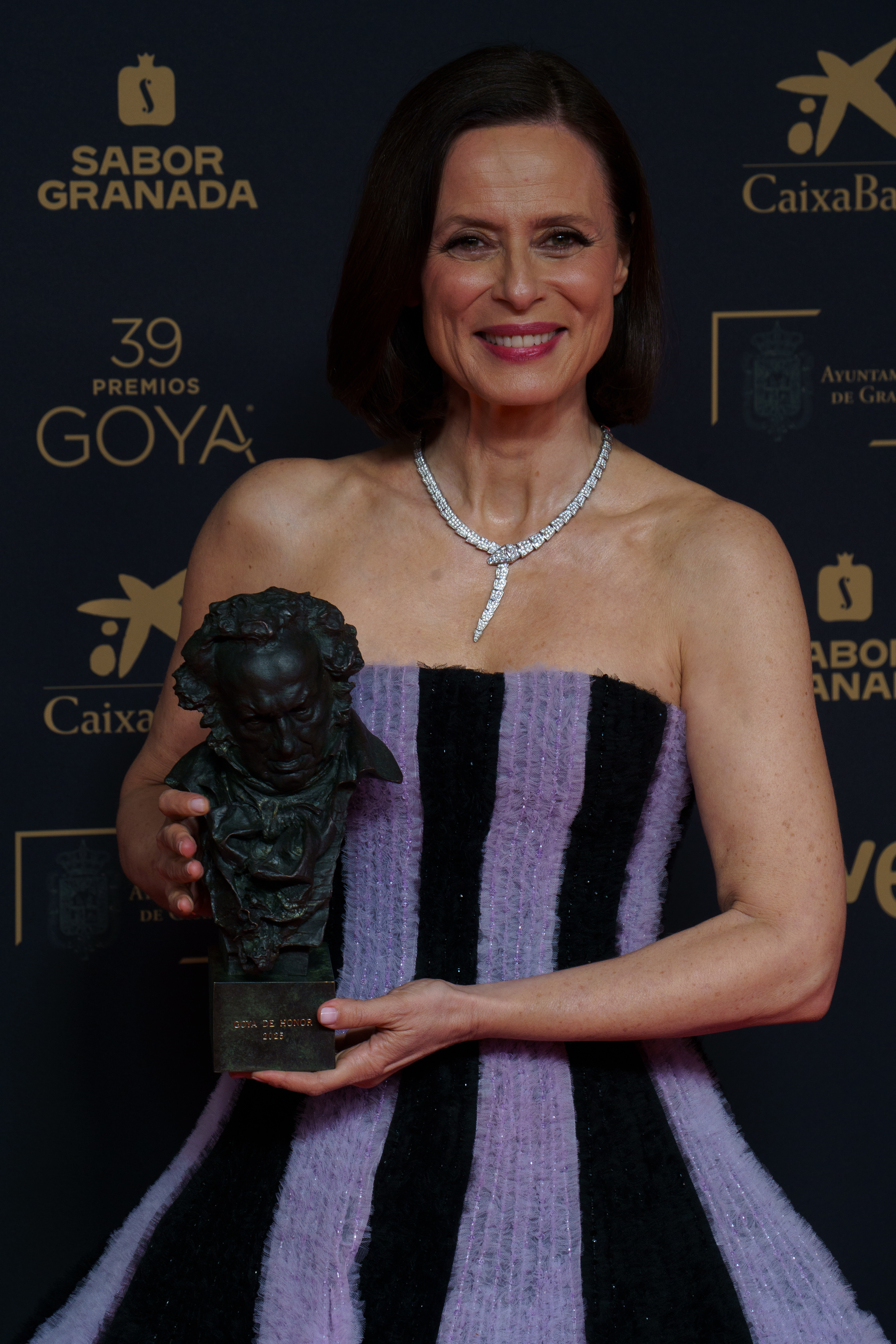
Aitana Sánchez-Gijón (2025)
