= Forty Degrees in the Shade =

- Directed by: Mariano Ozores
- Written by: Elena Tarche; Mariano Ozores; Alfonso Paso
- Produced by: Néstor Gaffet
- Starring: Gracita Morales; Antonio Ozores; Manuel Velasco
- Cinematography: Vicente Minaya
- Edited by: Rosa G. Salgado
- Music by: Guillermo Teruel
- Production companies: Cinehit; PEFSA
- Distributed by: Universal Films Española
- Release date: 21 December 1967
- Running time: 90 minutes
- Countries: Argentina; Spain
- Language: Spanish

Forty Degrees in the Shade (Spanish: 40 grados a la sombra) is a 1967 Argentine-Spanish comedy film directed by Mariano Ozores starring Gracita Morales, Antonio Ozores and Manuel Velasco.

== Cast ==
- Gracita Morales as Filomena
- Antonio Ozores as Evaristo Rodríguez
- Manuel Velasco as Miguel Pérez Valenzuela
- Xan das Bolas as Concierge at Evaristo's house
- Rafael Hernández as Taxi driver at Evaristo's house
- Vicente Roca
- José Manuel Martín
- Julio Riscal as Caradura
- Alfredo Landa as Máximo
- Erika Wallner as Patricia
- Julieta Serrano as Dorotea, Máximo's wife
- Laly Soldevila as Amparo, Máximo's sister in law
- Luis Rivera
- Venancio Muro as Employee of Saneamientos Pereda
- José Luis Carbonell
- José Luis López Vázquez as Jacinto
- Perla Cristal as Cándida
- Goyo Lebrero as Rómulo, waiter
- Rogelio Madrid
- Mario Morales
- Ana María Morales
- Paloma Cela
- Lourdes Albert
- Claudine Coppin as Claudine, cantante

== Bibliography ==
- Peter Cowie & Derek Elley. World Filmography: 1967. Fairleigh Dickinson University Press, 1977.
