= Paloma Cela =

Spanish actress and model (1943–2019)

- Born: María Luisa Cela Molinero; 4 March 1943; Madrid, Spain
- Died: 30 March 2019 (aged 76); Madrid, Spain
- Occupations: Actress and model
- Years active: 1967–2019

María Luisa Cela Molinero (4 March 1943 – 30 March 2019), better known by her stage name Paloma Cela, was a Spanish actress and model.

== Biography ==
Born in Madrid, Spain, she started out as a model and made her cinema debut in the 1967 film Operación cabaretera, directed by Mariano Ozores.

She spent the next thirty years of her career performing mainly in Comedy films until the early 1990s where she began appearing more often in Sitcoms such as ¡Ay, Señor, Señor! and ¡Ala... Dina!. In 1998 she starred in the comedy series Tío Willy which was the first series in Spain starring an LGBT character.

In the early 2000s she performed in a couple of plays such as the 2002 version of La venganza de la Petra and the 2003 version of Anacleto se divorcia

After the mid-2000s she only appeared in gossip programs such as Sálvame Deluxe where she found herself forced to defend herself from slanderous claims made about her by journalist Lydia Lozano.

== Death ==
Cela died at age 76 due to vascular issues. She died at Hospital La Paz in Madrid.

== Selected filmography ==
- Forty Degrees in the Shade (1967)
- Tepepa (1968)
- Cry Chicago (1969)
- Love and Other Solitudes (1969)
- A Town Called Bastard (1971)
- Dick Turpin (1974)
- The Legion Like Women (1976)
- Manuela (1976)
- Torrente 2: Misión en Marbella (2001)
