= Mutiny at Fort Sharpe =

1966 film

- Directed by: Fernando Cerchio
- Written by: Jesús Navarro Carrión; Ugo Liberatore; Fernando Cerchio
- Produced by: Eduardo Manzanos; Arturo Marcos
- Starring: Broderick Crawford; Elisa Montés; Mario Valdemarin
- Cinematography: Emilio Foriscot
- Edited by: Gianmaria Messeri
- Music by: Carlo Savina
- Production companies: Fénix Cooperativa Cinematográfica; Terra Film; Filmes Cinematografica; Società Europea Cinematografica
- Distributed by: Toleratus Films
- Release date: 9 January 1966
- Running time: 93 minutes
- Countries: Italy; Spain
- Language: Italian

Mutiny at Fort Sharpe (Italian: Per un dollaro di gloria) is a 1966 Italian-Spanish western film directed by Fernando Cerchio and starring Broderick Crawford, Elisa Montés and Mario Valdemarin. Produced when the boom in Spaghetti Westerns was at its height, it is set during the French Intervention in Mexico.

The film's sets were designed by the art director Giancarlo Bartolini Salimbeni. Location shooting took place in Spain including at Hoyo de Manzanares near Madrid.

== Cast ==
- Broderick Crawford as Colonel Lenox
- Elisa Montés as Brenda
- Mario Valdemarin as Captain Clermont
- Ugo Sasso as Sgt. Ross
- José Marco as cabo Brandy
- Umberto Ceriani as Southern Medical Lieutenant

== Bibliography ==
- Conway, Christopher. Heroes of the Borderlands: The Western in Mexican Film, Comics, and Music. University of New Mexico Press, 2019.
