= Antonio Ozores =

Spanish actor (1928–2010)

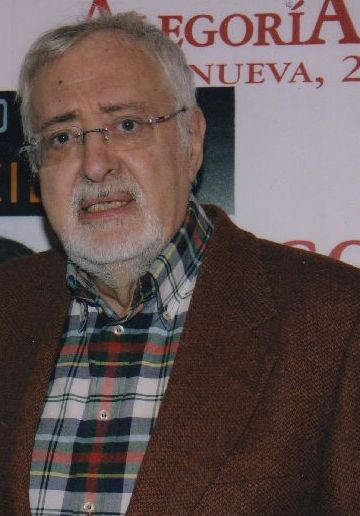
- Ozores in 2009
- Born: Antonio Ozores Puchol; 24 August 1928; Burjassot (Valencia), Spain
- Died: 12 May 2010 (aged 81); Madrid, Spain
- Occupation: Actor
- Spouse: Elisa Montés (m. 1960; div. 1968)
- Relatives: Mariano Ozores (brother); Adriana Ozores (niece); Emma Penella (sister-in-law); Terele Pávez (sister-in-law)

Antonio Ozores Puchol (24 August 1928 – 12 May 2010) was a Spanish actor.

He was the son of actors Mariano Ozores and Luisa Puchol, brother of director Mariano Ozores (Jr.) and of actor Jose Luis Ozores, father of Emma Ozores, and uncle of actress Adriana Ozores.

In 1960, he married Elisa Montés (actress and sister of the actresses Emma Penella and Terele Pávez), and was later divorced.

He died after a long battle with cancer on 12 May 2010, at the age of 81.

== Selected filmography ==
- El ultimo caballo (1950)
- Feather in the Wind (1952)
- Sister San Sulpicio (1952)
- Cerca de la ciudad (1952) ... as Cineasta
- Airport (1953)
- The Devil Plays the Flute (1953)
- An Andalusian Gentleman (1954)
- Love on Wheels (1954)
- Kubala (1955)
- Blond Arrow (1956)
- The Big Lie (1956)
- We Thieves Are Honourable (1956)
- Familia provisional (1958)
- Los Tramposos (1959) ... as Paco
- Tenemos 18 años (1959) directed by Jesus Franco
- The Daughters of Helena (1963)
- Honeymoon, Italian Style (1966)
- Forty Degrees in the Shade (1967)
- Operation Mata Hari (1968)
- El taxi de los conflictos (1969)
- La descarriada (1973) as Nicolás
- Fin de semana al desnudo (1974)
- English Striptease (1975)
- Los Energeticos (1979)
- Las Chicas del bingo (1982)
- Disparte nacional (1990)
- Pelotazo nacional (1993) ... as Candido
