= The Battalion in the Shadows =

1957 film by Manuel Mur Oti

- Directed by: Manuel Mur Oti
- Written by: Manuel Tamayo; Manuel Mur Oti
- Cinematography: Juan Mariné
- Edited by: Antonio Gimeno
- Music by: Guillermo Cases
- Production company: Suevia Films
- Distributed by: Suevia Films
- Release date: 29 April 1957
- Running time: 102 minutes
- Country: Spain
- Language: Spanish

The Battalion in the Shadows (Spanish: El batallón de las sombras) is a 1957 Spanish drama film directed by Manuel Mur Oti.

== Summary ==
The film narrates the dreams, hopes and passions of the inhabitants of a crowded tenement house.

== Cast ==
- Amparo Rivelles as Magdalena
- José Suárez as Pepe
- Rolf Wanka
- Emma Penella as Lola
- Lída Baarová
- Félix Dafauce
- Bobby Deglané
- Albert Hehn as Soldat
- Albert Lieven
- Katharina Mayberg
- Elisa Montés
- Fernando Nogueras
- Alicia Palacios
- Vicente Parra as Carlos
- Lidia San Clemente as child
- Pilar Sanclemente as Child
- Tony Soler
- Amelia de la Torre as Doña Engracia
- Antonio Vico

== Bibliography ==
- Mira, Alberto. Historical Dictionary of Spanish Cinema. Scarecrow Press, 2010.
