= María Pagés =

Spanish dancer and choreographer

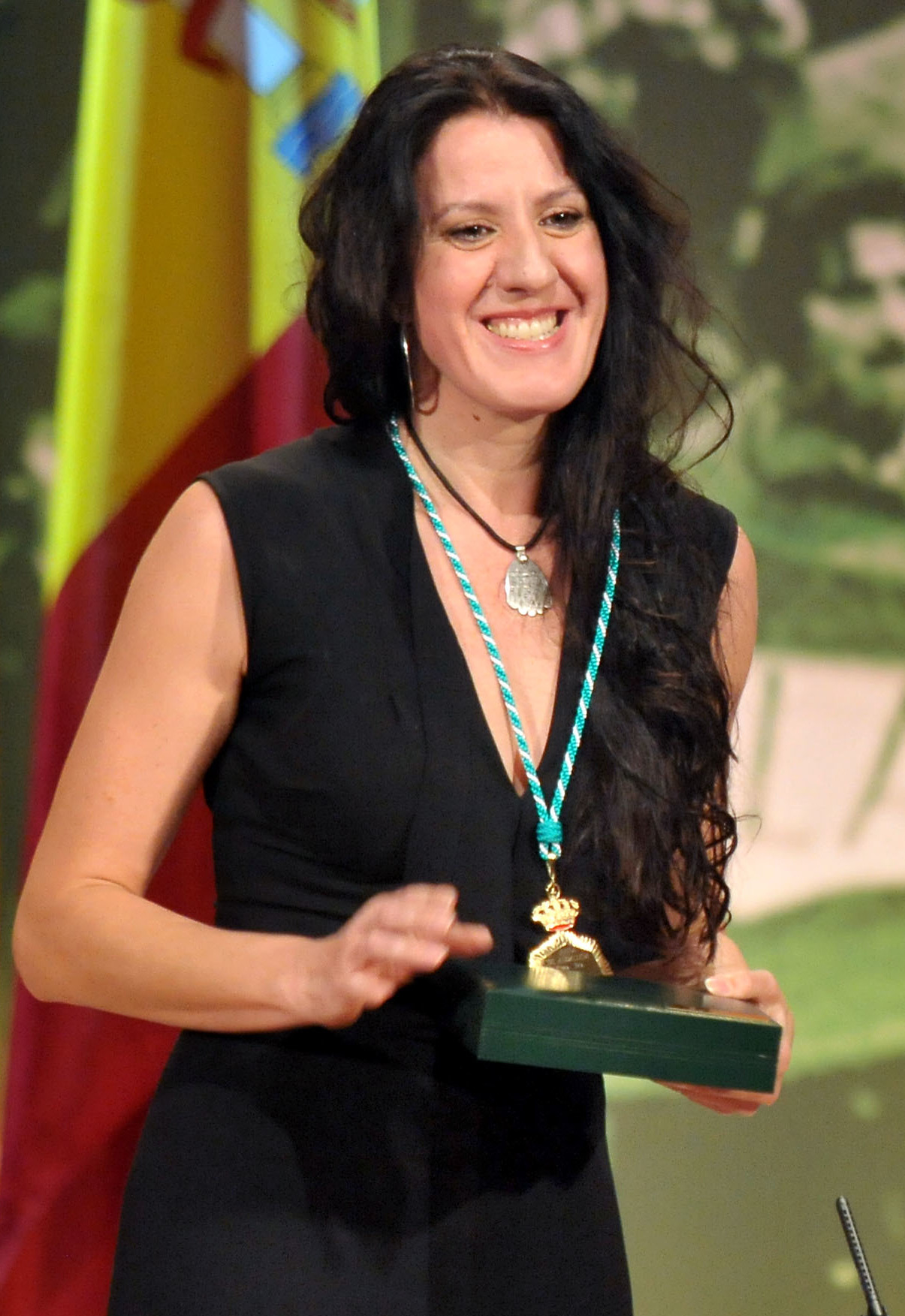
- María Pagés in 2011
- Born: María Jesús Pagés Madrigal; July 28, 1963 (age 63); Seville, Spain
- Known for: Dancer and choreographer
- Children: 1
- Awards: Gold Medal of Merit in the Fine Arts (Spain) 2014, Princess of Asturias Award in the category "Arts". 2022
- Website: http://www.mariapages.com/en/home

María Jesús Pagés Madrigal (b.- 28 July 1963), better known as María Pagés, is a modern Spanish dancer and choreographer. Considered one of the premier living Flamenco dancers, Pagés has been recognised internationally for decades as one of the top performers of the style, with her expressive stage presence and passionate, unique rhythmic interpretations. She is among the paramount representatives of flamenco vanguard. Critically and publicly acclaimed for her personal, aesthetic approach to Flamenco performance, Pagés has long-since proven herself to be the current leading pioneer in the modern understanding of this ever-evolving art form. In 1990, she founded a dance company which is now based in Madrid, and has continued performing worldwide ever since. In 2014, she was awarded the government's Gold Medal of Merit in the Fine Arts (Spain) by the Spanish Ministry of Culture. In 2022, she received the Princess of Asturias Award in the category "Arts", being the first flamenco dancer in history to receive this recognition.

== Life and career ==
María Jesús Pagés Madrigal was born in Seville, Andalucía, southern Spain, where she began dancing at a young age, professionally, with the Antonio Gades Company. She choreographed for several films, including Carmen, El Amor Brujo and Flamenco by Carlos Saura; in 1990, she founded the Maria Pagés Dance Company in Madrid. Her work is described as an incorporation of the Spanish flamenco style with personal touches and modern and global influences.

María Pagés and her company have toured internationally for decades, appearing at theatres such as the Royal Albert Hall, London, Baryshnikov Arts Center and Radio City Music Hall, New York, and The Kennedy Center, Washington, D.C., among dozens of other iconic venues.

In 1995, Pagés was asked by Irish pianist and composer Bill Whelan to join the cast of his (at the time) new stage production, Riverdance, which had made its triumphant debut as the interval performance in the 1994 Eurovision Song Contest and was being developed into a full show. Primarily celebrating Ireland and its ancient and modern history, mythology, music and dance, Riverdance also paid tribute to other styles of dance and music that have influenced Ireland, such as that of Spain; the live show featured Pagés in two solo pieces (one in act I and the second in act II), titled "Firedance" and "Andalucía", respectively. In the earliest versions of Riverdance, famed Irish-American dancer Michael Flatley occasionally joined Pagés for "Firedance" in a fusion of Flamenco and Irish dance performance. In later iterations of the show, such as in the late 1990s, she would appear a third time on stage, dancing somewhat more casually, playing castanets and interacting with fiddler Eileen Ivers. In 2000, Pagés provided choreography for the Hispanic Heritage Awards. Presently, she serves on the board of the Cultural Council in Madrid.

== Honors and awards ==
- 1996 - National Choreography Award
- Giraldillos Awards, Giennale of Arte Flamenco (four times)
- 2002 - National Dance Award
- 2004 - Leonid Massine Award, Italy
- 2005 - Flamenco Awards, VI Edition
- 2005 - Premios Flamenco Hoy, VI
- 2006 - Cultura Viva Award
- 2007 - Premio Cultura, Community of Madrid
- 2011 - International Award Terenci Moix
- 2011 - Medal of Andalucía
- 2014 - Gold Medal of Merit in the Fine Arts (Spain)
- 2022 - Princess of Asturias Award in the category "Arts".

== Works ==
Selected works include:

- Sol y sombra (1990)
- De la luna al viento (1994)
- Riverdance (1995–1996)
- El perro andaluz, Burlerías (1996)
- La tirana (1998)
- Flamenco Republic (2001)
- Ilusiones FM (2002)
- Canciones, antes de una guerra (2004)
- Sevilla (2006)
- Autorretrato (2008)
- Flamenco y Poesía (2008)
- Dunas (2009)
- Mirada (2010)
- Utopia (2011)
- Yo, Carmen (2018)

== Filmography ==
Pagés has appeared in television and films including:

- Miradas 2 (TV series documentary) (2010–11)
- A escena (TV series) (2010)
- Ànima (TV series) (2009)
- Plácido y la copla (TV movie) (2008)
- La mandrágora (TV series)(2006)
- The Late Late Show (TV series) (2003)
- Riverdance: The New Show (1996)
- Riverdance: The Show (1995)
- Flamenco (1995)
