= The Daughters of Helena =

- Directed by: Mariano Ozores
- Written by: Mariano Ozores; José María Palacio
- Produced by: Arturo González hijo
- Starring: Isabel Garcés; Antonio Ozores; Laura Valenzuela
- Cinematography: Mario Pacheco
- Edited by: Pedro del Rey
- Music by: Adolfo Waitzman
- Production company: José Frade Producciones Cinematográficas
- Distributed by: Exclusivas Floralva Distribución
- Release date: 1963
- Running time: 79 minutes
- Country: Spain
- Language: Spanish

The Daughters of Helena (Spanish: Las hijas de Helena) is a 1963 Spanish comedy film directed by Mariano Ozores and starring Isabel Garcés, Antonio Ozores and Laura Valenzuela.

== Cast ==
- Isabel Garcés as Doña Helena
- Antonio Ozores as Alejandro
- Laura Valenzuela as Mari Paz
- José Luis López Vázquez as Manolo
- Manolo Gómez Bur as Leopoldo
- Soledad Miranda as Mari Po
- Félix Fernández as Don Fabián
- Roberto Rey
- Luis Sánchez Polack as Abelardo López, el poeta
- Valeriano Andrés as Don Renato Romeo, el jefe
- Ana María Custodio
- Emilio Laguna as Tito
- José María Tasso as Fito
- José Luis Carbonell
- José Orjas as Invitado a boda fustrada
- José Santamaría
- Julio Goróstegui
- José Morales as Colaborador de Alejandro
- Juan Cortés
- Pedro Beltrán
- Pedro Rodríguez de Quevedo
- Cecilia Villarreal
- José Riesgo
- Manuel Guitián
- Antonio Burgos
- Manuel Aguilera
- Mike Brendel
- Joaquín Bergía
- Montserrat Laguna
- Manuel Díaz González
- María Mahor as Mari Pepa
- Mariano Gómez Bur
- Rafaela Aparicio as Esposa del apostador de quinielas

== Bibliography ==
- Virginia Sánchez Rodríguez. La banda sonora musical en el cine español y su empleo en la configuración de tipologías de mujer(1960-1969). Ediciones Universidad de Salamanca, 2014.
