= Blond Arrow =

- Spanish: Saeta rubia
- Directed by: Javier Setó
- Produced by: Cesáreo González
- Starring: Alfredo Di Stefano; Donatella Marrosu; Antonio Ozores
- Production company: Suevia Films
- Release date: 6 March 1956
- Running time: 84 minutes
- Country: Spain
- Language: Spanish

Blond Arrow (Spanish: Saeta rubia) is a 1956 Spanish film directed by Florián Rey and starring Alfredo Di Stéfano, Antonio Casal and Antonio Ozores. Di Stéfano, one of the stars of the Real Madrid side of the 1950s, appears as himself. The film's title refers to his nickname. It was made by Suevia Films, Spain's leading film studio of the era.

== Plot ==
The film is a biography of Alfredo Di Stéfano who travelled from Argentina to Madrid to try to win fame and fortune as a football player.
