= Terele Pávez =

Spanish actress

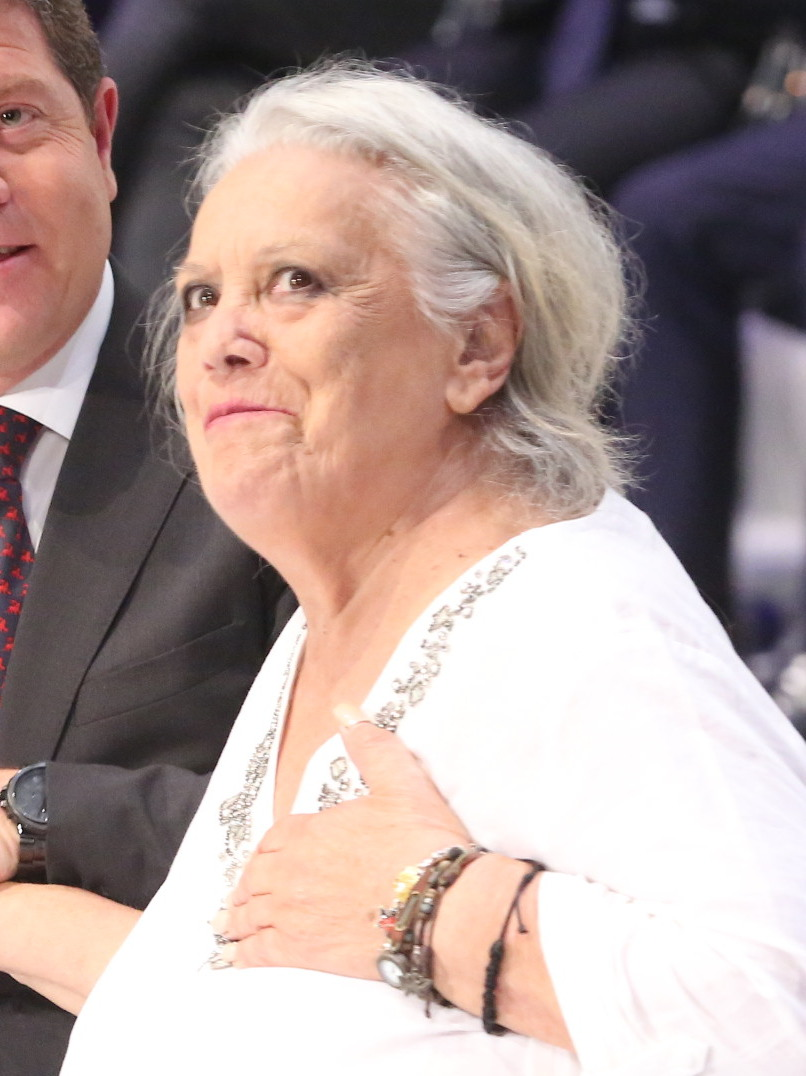
- Pávez in May 2017
- Born: Teresa Marta Ruiz Penella; 29 July 1939; Bilbao, Spain
- Died: 11 August 2017 (aged 78); Madrid, Spain
- Occupation: Actress
- Years active: 1954–2017
- Children: 1
- Father: Ramón Ruiz Alonso
- Relatives: Emma Penella (sister); Elisa Montés (sister); Antonio Ozores (brother-in-law); Manuel Penella Moreno (grandfather)

Teresa Marta Ruiz Penella (29 July 1939 – 11 August 2017), better known as Terele Pávez, was a Spanish actress. She appeared in more than ninety films from 1954 to her death in 2017.

== Life and career ==
Teresa Marta Ruiz Penella was born in Bilbao on 29 July 1939 but she was raised in Madrid. She was the daughter of CEDA politician Ramón Ruiz Alonso and Magdalena Penella Silva and the niece of actress Teresita Silva. Composers Manuel Penella Moreno and Manuel Penella Raga were, respectively, her grandfather and great-grandfather. She was the aunt of actress Emma Ozores. Two out of her three sisters also pursued an acting career, under the artistic names of Emma Penella and Elisa Montés, reneging on the paternal surname. She took her artistic name after the second family name of her grandmother on her mother side, Emma Silva Pávez, of Chilean background. She made her big screen debut in Boyfriend in Sight.

He starred as witch-procuress Celestina in La Celestina (1996). She reportedly was surprised at being offered a leading role instead of the supporting role to which she was used to, and claimed to be afraid of diving into the psychology of an extremely manipulative and dark character. She had already experience in Fernando de Rojas' work as she had played Celestina's pupil Elicia in a 1978 play. Her work earned her an Actors Union Award for Best Leading Performance in a Film.

Pávez had one son (Carolo) with publisher José Benito Alique.

She died on 11 August 2017 at the Hospital de La Paz in Madrid due to a stroke at the age of 78.

== Selected filmography ==
=== Film ===
Year	Title	Role	Notes	Ref.
1954	Novio a la vista (Boyfriend in Sight)	Pecas	Feature film debut	
1959	Las dos y media y... veneno			
1959	15 bajo la lona			
1961	Tenemos 18 años	Pili		
1961	Salto mortal			
1962	La boda era a las doce			
1968	No somos de piedra			
1970	Fortunata y Jacinta	Mauricia la Dura		
1974	La revolución matrimonial (The Marriage Revolution)	Secretaria		
1975	Malocchio (Evil Eye)			
1976	Tatuaje (Tattoo)	La Andaluza		
1976	La espada negra	Reina Madre		
1978	Carne apaleada			
1978	Oro rojo (Red Gold)			
1984	Los santos inocentes (The Holy Innocents)	Régula		
1985	Réquiem por un campesino español (Requiem for a Spanish Peasant)	La Jerónima		
1985	La noche de la ira			
1986	El hermano bastardo de Dios (The Bastard Brother of God)	Ramona		
1987	Laura, del cielo llega la noche (Laura)			
1988	El Lute II: mañana seré libre (El Lute II: Tomorrow I'll be Free)			
1988	Diario de invierno (Winter Diary)	Madre ('mother')		
1988	El aire de un crimen (Scent of a Crime)			
1990	Los días del cometa			
1993	El laberinto griego (The Greek Labyrinth)	Remei		
1995	El día de la bestia (The Day of the Beast)	Rosario		
1996	La Celestina	Celestina		
1997	99.9: La frecuencia del terror (99.9)	Dolores		
2000	La comunidad (Common Wealth)	Ramona		
2002	800 balas (800 Bullets)	Rocío		
2003	Nudos			
2004	Mala uva			
2007	Café solo o con ellas (Love Expresso)	Paca		
2007	Los Totenwackers	Doña Sabrina		
2010	Balada triste de trompeta (The Last Circus)	Dolores		
2013	Las brujas de Zugarramurdi (Witching & Bitching)	Maritxu		
2015	Las aventuras de Moriana			
2015	Mi gran noche (My Big Night)	Dolores		
2016	La puerta abierta (The Open Door)	Antonia		
2017	El bar (The Bar)	Amparo		
2017	Incerta glòria (Uncertain Glory)	Molinera		
2019	¡Ay, mi madre!	Petra	Posthumous work	
2020	Caribe, todo incluido		Posthumous work	

=== Television ===
Year	Title	Role	Notes	Ref.
1977	Curro Jiménez	Lola		
1978	Cañas y barro	Samaruca		
1979	La barraca			
1985	La huella del crimen	Pilar Prades Expósito		
2002	Cuéntame cómo pasó	Doña Pura	Introduced in season 2	
2006	Manolo y Benito Corporeision	Antonia		
2016	Buscando el norte	Nines		

== Accolades ==
Year	Award	Category	Work	Result	Ref.
1988	2nd Goya Awards	Best Supporting Actress	Laura	Nominated	
1989	3rd Goya Awards	Best Supporting Actress	Winter Diary	Nominated	
1997	6th Actors Union Awards	Best Film Performance in a Leading Role	La Celestina	Won	
2001	15th Goya Awards	Best Supporting Actress	Common Wealth	Nominated	
2011	25th Goya Awards	Best Supporting Actress	The Last Circus	Nominated	
2014	1st Feroz Awards	Best Supporting Actress in a Film	Witching & Bitching	Won	
2014	28th Goya Awards	Best Supporting Actress	Witching & Bitching	Won	
2016	25th Actors and Actresses Union Awards	Best Film Actress in a Secondary Role	Las aventuras de Moriana	Nominated	
2017	4th Feroz Awards	Best Supporting Actress in a Film	The Open Door	Nominated	
2017	72nd CEC Medals	Best Supporting Actress	The Open Door	Nominated	
2017	31st Goya Awards	Best Supporting Actress	The Open Door	Nominated	
2017	26th Actors and Actresses Union Awards	Best Film Actress in a Secondary Role	The Open Door	Nominated	
