= Antonio Gades =

Spanish dancer and choreographer (1936-2004)

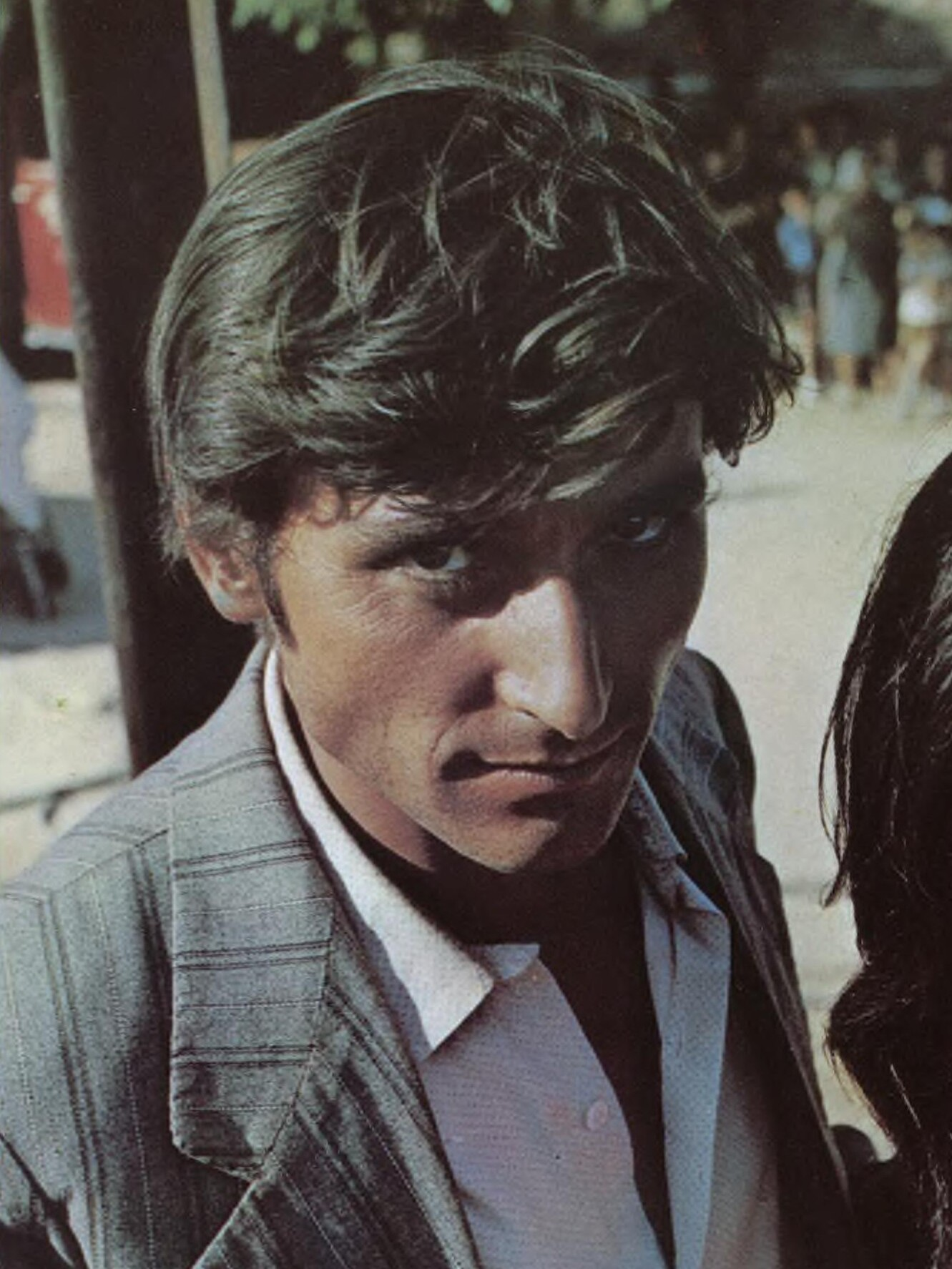
- Gades in 1966
- Born: Antonio Esteve Ródenas; 14 November 1936; Elda, Alicante, Spain
- Died: 20 July 2004 (aged 67); Madrid, Spain
- Occupations: Dancer and choreographer
- Spouses: Marujita Díaz (m. 1964–1965) Pilar San Clemente (m. 1968–1971) Pepa Flores (m. 1982–1986) Daniela Frey (m. 1988–1993) Eugenia Eiriz (m. 2003–2004)
- Children: 5, including María Esteve
- Awards: Orden José Martí; Creu de Sant Jordi

Antonio Esteve Ródenas or Antonio Gades (14 November 1936 – 20 July 2004) was a Spanish flamenco dancer and choreographer. He helped to popularize the art form on the international stage. He was born in Elda, Alicante, and was the father of actress María Esteve and singer Celia Flores-- with his ex-partner Marisol, herself a popular actress and singer.

== Career ==
=== Flamenco ===
Gades's most notable works included dance adaptations of Prosper Mérimée's Carmen and Federico García Lorca's Blood Wedding (Bodas de Sangre), as well as a feature-length adaptation of Manuel de Falla's 23-minute ballet El amor brujo.

In the 1990s, he toured the world with his show Fuenteovejuna, based on Lope de Vega's play of the same name.

=== Film ===
Gades collaborated with the Spanish director Carlos Saura in the filming of the adaptations of Carmen and Blood Wedding, which also featured Cristina Hoyos.

=== Ballet ===
Gades co-founded and became the artistic director of the Ballet Nacional de España in 1978.

== Personal life and death ==
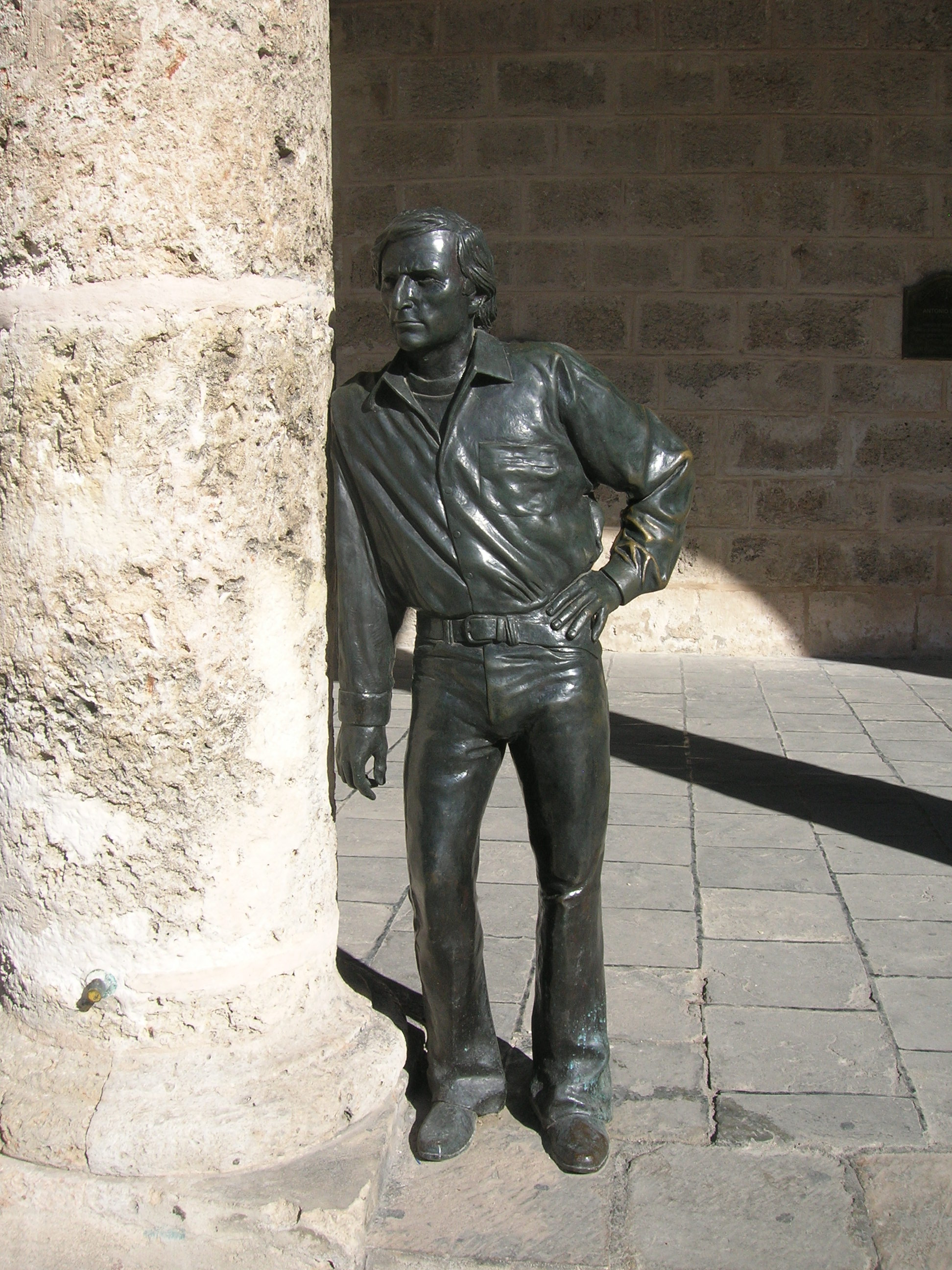
Statue of Antonio Gades, by the sculptor José Villa Soberón. The statue stands in front of the Palacio de Lombillo, on the Plaza de la Catedral in Havana Vieja, Cuba

Gades was prominent as a political activist in Alicante, where he proclaimed self-determination for the Catalan nation during the Spanish Transition between the late 1970s and early 1980s. He was a member of the Central Committee of the Communist Party of the Peoples of Spain, a Marxist–Leninist organization. In 1987 he was a member of the jury at the 15th Moscow International Film Festival.

He was married to the Spanish actress and singer Marisol for 4 years; they had three daughters.

He died in Madrid from cancer.

== Awards ==
About six weeks before his death, Gades received the "Order of José Martí", one of the highest honors of Cuba, from Fidel Castro, in Havana, Cuba.

In 2004 his ashes were interred at the Mausoleum of the Frank País Second Eastern Front, a memorial cemetery in Santiago de Cuba.

== Filmography ==
- Los Tarantos 1963
- The Pleasure Seekers 1964
- With the East Wind 1966
- El amor brujo 1967
- The Last Meeting 1967
- Bodas de sangre 1981
- Carmen 1983
- El amor brujo 1986
- Fuenteovejuna 2012

== See also ==
- List of dancers
