= Heart of the Forest =

1979 film

- Directed by: Manuel Gutiérrez Aragón
- Starring: Norman Briski
- Cinematography: Teodoro Escamilla
- Release date: February 1979
- Country: Spain
- Language: Spanish

Heart of the Forest (Spanish: El corazón del bosque) is a 1979 Spanish film directed by Manuel Gutiérrez Aragón. It was entered into the 29th Berlin International Film Festival.

== Plot ==
"Told in a manner more common during the Franco era, [The Heart of the Forest] tells the story of a man who fought with the Republican forces during the Spanish Civil War (1936-39) and has been hiding in the hills for 10 years," notes the entry for the film on the collaboratively authored cinephile site Letterboxd. "Local people help him avoid constant searches by the police, who know he is there. A returning exile seeks him out to try to get him to surrender, with tragic consequences for both of them."

The Spanish film site ZineBi describes El corazón del bosque as part of "a sort of triptych" that also includes Camada negra (Black Litter, 1977) and Sonámbulos (Somnambulists, 1978). All three films draw on the aesthetic of the fantastic to address "the ideological roots of fascist groups, the growing internal contradictions of the opposition against Franco during the Transition, or the tenuous border between surrender and progress in the ... postwar period," notes ZineBi. Of the three,El corazónis "one of the most successful historical fables" in Spanish cinema, the author observes, marrying "the fairy tale structure to other forms of primitive narrative condensed in folktales, lullabies, or mythical characters that live hidden in trembling forests—forests that the director knows how to film and in which he shows without being explicit (using the ellipsis so present in his films) ancient deep questions where there were, perhaps, only superficial recent answers."

== Cast ==
- Norman Briski as Juan
- Ángela Molina as Amparo
- Luis Politti as El Andarín
- Víctor Valverde as Suso
