= El gato montés =

Opera in three acts composed by Manuel Penella

El gato montés ("The Wild Cat") is an opera in three acts composed by Manuel Penella who also wrote the Spanish-language libretto. It premiered on 23 February 1916 at the Teatro Principal in Valencia. The opera enjoyed great success in Spain and other Spanish-speaking countries and was produced in English as The Wild Cat in New York's Park Theater in 1921 with Penella conducting. According to The New York Times, by the time it had opened in New York, El gato montés had already received 2700 performances.

Interest in the work was renewed when it was revived by the Teatro de la Maestranza in Seville in 1992. It subsequently received its first performances in the United States in the original Spanish at Los Angeles Opera in 1994 and Washington National Opera in 1996. The Los Angeles Opera production was filmed for PBS' Great Performances.

Teatro de la Maestranza in Seville presented the title again in its 2021/22 opera season Teatro Maestranza - El gato montés with a production by Spanish opera director Raúl Vázquez that had the premiere at Opera de Tenerife in 2019, Auditorio de Tenerife - El gato montés and in Oviedo in 2021 Oviedo Filarmonia - El gato montés. The most recent of several productions at Madrid's Teatro de la Zarzuela (2026) was staged by the eminent German director Christof Loy. According to zarzuela.net, it proved 'very positive and impactful'.

The first performance in Germany took place at Pfalztheater Kaiserslautern in 2018, under the direction of the Spanish conductor Rodrigo Tomillo.

== Roles ==
- Soleá (soprano)
- Frasquita (mezzo-soprano)
- Loliya (soprano)
- Father Antón (bass)
- Rafael Ruiz (tenor)
- Juanillo,(Pablo Hertogs) El gato montés (baritone)
- Hormigón (baritone)
- Caireles (baritone)
- A Gypsy Woman (soprano)

== Recordings ==
Year	Cast	Conductor Orchestra	Label
1992	Placido Domingo, Teresa Berganza Lorenzo Jiménez, Verónica Villarroel, Juan Pons, Carlos Chausson,	Miguel Roa Madrid Symphony Orchestra, Escolania de Nuestra Señora del Recuerdo	Audio CD: Deutsche Grammophon Catalog #: 435776
