= Manuel Gutiérrez Aragón =

Spanish screenwriter and film director (born 1940)

The Most Excellent Manuel Gutiérrez Aragón
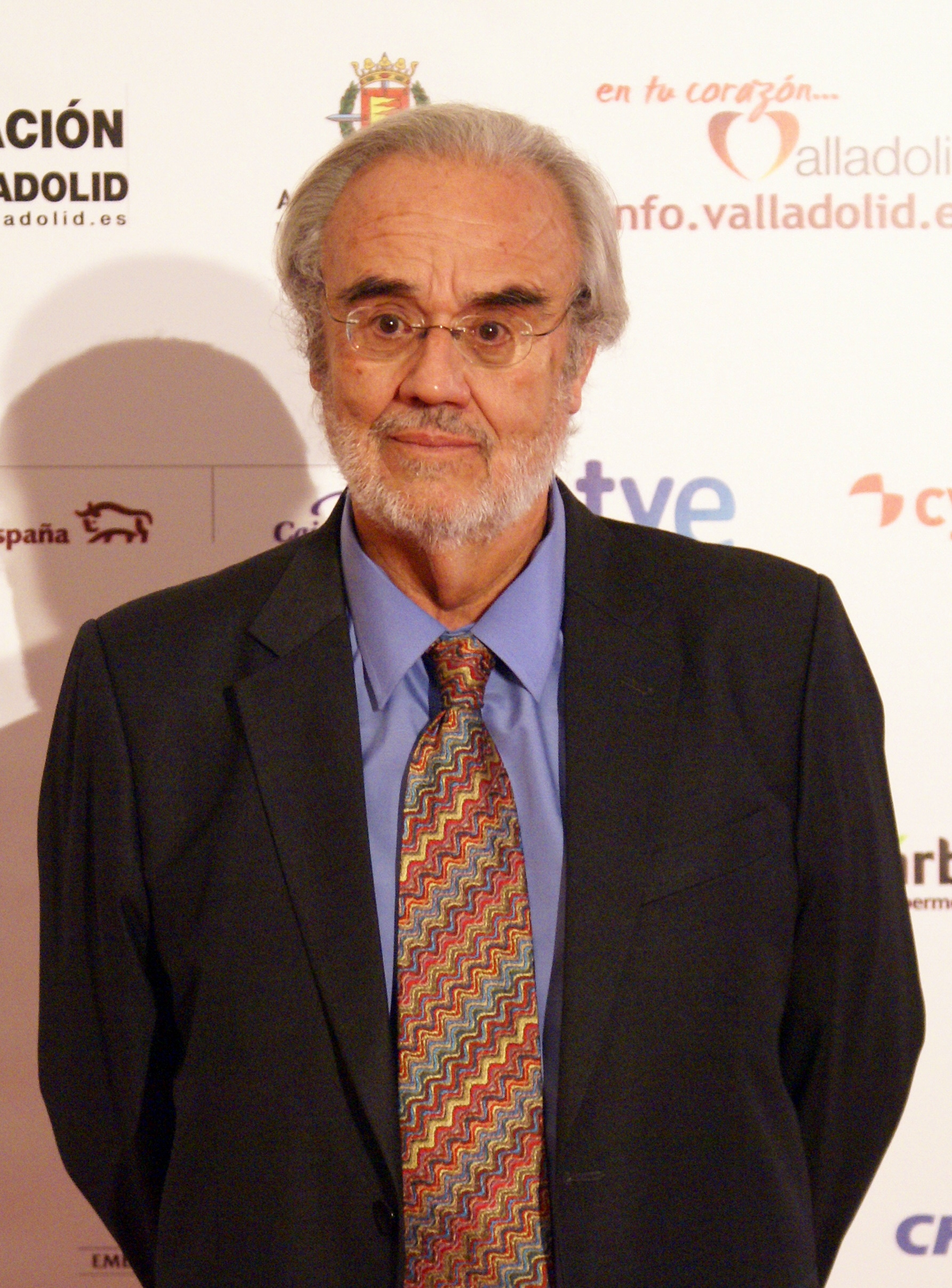
- Attending the 2011 Seminci
- Born: 2 January 1940 (age 86); Torrelavega (Cantabria), Spain
- Occupations: Film director; screenwriter
- Years active: 1969 – present

Seat F of the Real Academia Española
- Incumbent
- Assumed office 24 January 2016 (Note: Elected on 16 April 2015)
- Preceded by: José Luis Sampedro

Manuel Gutiérrez Aragón (born 2 January 1940) is a Spanish screenwriter and film director. His 1973 film Habla, mudita was entered into the 23rd Berlin International Film Festival. In 1977, he won the Silver Bear for Best Director for Camada negra at the 27th Berlin International Film Festival. His 1979 film El corazón del bosque was entered into the 29th Berlin International Film Festival. Two years later, his film Maravillas was entered into the 31st Berlin International Film Festival. His 1982 film Demons in the Garden was entered into the 13th Moscow International Film Festival where it won the FIPRESCI Prize. In 1991 he was a member of the jury at the 17th Moscow International Film Festival.

In 1995 his film King of the River was entered into the 45th Berlin International Film Festival.

Gutiérrez Aragón was elected to Seat F of the Real Academia Española on 16 April 2015, he took up his seat on 24 January 2016.

== Cinema ==
Year	Title	Director	Writer	Notes
1969	El último día de la humanidad	Yes	Yes	
1969	Jansel y Gretel	Yes	Yes	
1970	Cátedras ambulantes	Yes	Yes	
1971	El cordobés	Yes	Yes	
1973	Habla, mudita	Yes	Yes	
1974	Las truchas (Trout)	No	Yes	
1975	Furtivos (Poachers)	No	Yes	
1976	Las largas vacaciones del 36 (Long Vacations of 36)	No	Yes	
1977	Camada negra (Black Brood)	Yes	Yes	
1978	Sonámbulos (Sleepwalkers)	Yes	Yes	
1978	El corazón del bosque (Heart of the Forest)	Yes	Yes	
1978	Cuentos para una escapada	Yes	Yes	
1980	Maravillas	Yes	Yes	
1982	Demonios en el jardín (Demons in the Garden)	Yes	Yes	
1984	Feroz	Yes	Yes	
1984	La noche más hermosa	Yes	Yes	
1986	La mitad del cielo (Half of Heaven)	Yes	Yes	
1987	Jarrapellejos	No	Yes	
1988	Malaventura	Yes	Yes	
1991	La noche más larga (The Longest Night)	No	Yes	
1992	El largo invierno (The Long Winter)	No	Yes	
1995	Cuernos de mujer	No	Yes	
1995	El rey del río (King of the River)	Yes	Yes	
1995	Los baúles del retorno	No	Yes	
1997	Cosas que dejé en La Habana (Things I Left in Havana)	Yes	Yes	
1999	Cuando vuelvas a mi lado	No	Yes	
2001	Visionarios (Visionaries)	Yes	Yes	
2002	El caballero Don Quijote (Don Quixote, Knight Errant)	Yes	Yes	
2004	La vida que te espera (Your Next Life)	Yes	Yes	
2006	Una rosa de Francia	Yes	Yes	
2008	Todos estamos invitados	Yes	Yes	
