= King of the River (film) =

1995 film

- Directed by: Manuel Gutiérrez Aragón
- Written by: José Luis García Sánchez; Manuel Gutiérrez Aragón
- Produced by: Andrés Vicente Gómez
- Starring: Alfredo Landa
- Cinematography: Teo Escamilla
- Release date: 2 February 1995
- Running time: 103 minutes
- Country: Spain
- Language: Spanish

King of the River (Spanish: El rey del río) is a 1995 Spanish drama film directed by Manuel Gutiérrez Aragón. It was entered into the 45th Berlin International Film Festival.

== Cast ==
- Alfredo Landa as Antón Costa
- Carmen Maura as Carmen
- Gustavo Salmerón as César
- Ana Álvarez as Ana
- Achero Mañas as Fernando
- Miriam Fernández as Elena (as Miriam Ubri)
- Sílvia Munt as Elisa
- Héctor Alterio as Juan
- Cesáreo Estébanez as Corcones
- Gerardo Vera as Bergasa
- Francis Lorenzo as Marco
