= Carmen (1983 film) =

- Spanish film poster
- Directed by: Carlos Saura
- Screenplay by: Carlos Saura; Antonio Gades
- Based on: Carmen by Georges Bizet Ludovic Halévy Henri Meilhac; Carmen by Prosper Mérimée
- Produced by: Emiliano Piedra
- Starring: Antonio Gades; Laura del Sol; Paco de Lucía
- Cinematography: Teo Escamilla
- Edited by: Pedro del Rey
- Music by: Paco de Lucía (score); Georges Bizet (themes)
- Production company: Televisión Española
- Distributed by: C.B. Films S.A.
- Release date: 6 May 1983
- Running time: 102 minutes
- Country: Spain
- Language: Spanish
- Box office: $3.1 million (United States and Canada)

Carmen is a 1983 Spanish romantic musical drama film and an adaptation of Prosper Mérimée's novel Carmen, incorporating music from Georges Bizet's opera of the same name. Directed and choreographed in the flamenco style by Carlos Saura and María Pagés, it constitutes the second installment of Saura's flamenco trilogy in the 1980s, preceded by Bodas de sangre and followed by El amor brujo. The film received an Academy Award nomination for Best Foreign Language Film at the 56th Academy Awards.

The film follows modern dancers as they re-enact Bizet's tragic love affair in their personal lives, culminating in its fatal conclusion.

== Plot ==
The choreographer Antonio is preparing a performance of George Bizet's opera Carmen, intending to infuse it with Spanish music and flamenco dances. He collaborates with Paco, a guitarist who adapts the original music for his instrument. Despite searching his flamenco school for the perfect Carmen, Antonio struggles to find the right fit. His best dancer, Cristina, is deemed too old for the role. However, Carmen herself catches his eye during a rehearsal, captivating him with her fiery dance and allure.

After a flamenco show, Antonio gifts Carmen a book by Prosper Mérimée, urging her to read it, convinced she's destined for the role. He then enlists Cristina to train Carmen intensively. During rehearsals, Antonio guides the actors to imagine the setting and atmosphere, setting the stage for Carmen and Cristina's intense rivalry, performed through dance.

As Antonio falls for Carmen, they share a passionate encounter. Yet, Carmen abruptly leaves in the night, revealing she's married. Despite this, Antonio gives her money when she claims her husband wants to start afresh. However, Carmen's husband reveals his intentions to continue his criminal activities, sparking a physical altercation between him and Antonio.

In a pivotal scene, Carmen's betrayal becomes evident when Antonio discovers her with another man. The tension escalates when Carmen tells Antonio that their relationship is finished. Driven by jealousy, he kills her with a switchblade.

The performance blurs the lines between reality and fiction as Antonio and Carmen's relationship unravels onstage. Ultimately, Antonio's desperation leads to tragedy, leaving the audience questioning what is real and what is part of the performance.

== Cast ==
- Paco de Lucía as Paco
- Laura del Sol as Carmen
- Antonio Gades as Antonio
- Marisol as Pepa Flores
- Cristina Hoyos as Cristina
- Juan Antonio Jiménez as Juan
- José Yepes as Pepe Girón
- Sebastián Moreno as Escamillo
- Gómez de Jerez as Singer
- Manolo Sevilla as Singer
- Antonio Solera as Singer
- Manuel Rodríguez as Guitarist
- Lorenzo Virseda as Guitarist
- M. Magdalena as Guest artist
- La Bronce as Guest artist

== Reception ==
=== Box office ===
The film was the highest-grossing Spanish film in the United States at the time, grossing $3.1 million. It was surpassed by Pedro Almodóvar's Women on the Verge of a Nervous Breakdown (1988). It sold 2,168,737 tickets in Germany and 871,824 in France.

=== Critical reception ===
According to Lexikon des internationalen Films, "Saura's approach distinguishes itself from conventional adaptations primarily by making the process of adaptation itself the focal point and by delving into the connections between art and life. Expertly crafted dance sequences and an enthralling musical score (featuring guitarist Paco de Lucia, who reinterprets Bizet's compositions within the framework of Spanish folk culture) obscure some weaknesses within the narrative sections of the film."

In the words of Die Chronik des Films, "As the stage actors themselves experience the storyline, the line between reality and fiction becomes indistinct. The viewer is left pondering whether the murder depicted in the film truly took place. Despite a few dialogue shortcomings, the brilliant dance sequences and the Flamenco music by Paco de Lucia render Carmen a film well worth seeing." According to Busch Entertainment Media, "Repeatedly, the depicted scenes seamlessly transform into sophisticated dances, electrified by the Flamenco music of guitarist Paco de Lucia. Saura intertwines the process of material development in the dance studio with discourses on art and life."

=== Awards and nominations ===
The film won the BAFTA Award for Best Foreign Language Film. It was submitted to the 1983 Cannes Film Festival, where it received the Technical Grand Prize and the award for Best Artistic Contribution. Additionally, it earned nominations for the Academy Award for Best Foreign Language Film, the 1984 César Awards for Best Foreign Film, and the 1984 Golden Globe Award for Best Foreign Language Film.

== See also ==
- List of submissions to the 56th Academy Awards for Best Foreign Language Film
- List of Spanish submissions for the Academy Award for Best Foreign Language Film
