= Blood Wedding (1981 film) =

- Directed by: Carlos Saura
- Written by: Carlos Saura; Antonio Artero; Antonio Gades; Alfredo Mañas
- Produced by: Emiliano Piedra
- Starring: Antonio Gades; Cristina Hoyos; Juan Antonio Jiménez
- Cinematography: Teo Escamilla
- Edited by: Pablo González del Amo
- Music by: Emilio de Diego
- Release date: 9 March 1981
- Running time: 72 minutes
- Country: Spain
- Language: Spanish

Blood Wedding (Spanish: Bodas de sangre) is a 1981 Spanish musical film written and directed by Carlos Saura. It was directed and choreographed in the flamenco style. It is the first part of Saura's 1980s flamenco trilogy, and is followed by Carmen (1983) and El amor brujo (1986).

The film depicts Antonio Gades and his dance company performing a flamenco adaptation of Federico García Lorca's play Blood Wedding. As with all Saura's flamenco films, the film is overtly theatrical: it begins with the company arriving at the studio and putting on costumes and makeup. The dance is then performed in a bare windowed space with a minimum of props and no set. There are no elaborate costumes and many of the actors wear only their rehearsal clothes.

It was shown out of competition at the 1981 Cannes Film Festival.

== Cast ==
- Antonio Gades as Leonardo
- Cristina Hoyos as Bride
- Juan Antonio Jiménez as Groom
- Pilar Cárdenas as Mother
- Carmen Villena as Wife

== Influences ==
The video clip for Figlio della luna, the Italian version of the 1986 song Hijo de la Luna by Mecano, has a esthetic related to Blood Wedding.
