= Emiliano Piedra =

- Born: Emiliano Piedra Miana; 1931; Madrid, Spain
- Died: 28 August 1991 (aged 59–60); Madrid, Spain
- Occupation: Film producer
- Spouse: Emma Penella (m. 1967)

Emiliano Piedra Miana (1931–August 28, 1991) was a Spanish film producer.

He was married from 1967 until his death to actress Emma Penella. He produced Orson Welles' Chimes at Midnight and Carlos Saura's flamenco trilogy film: Bodas de sangre, Carmen and El amor brujo.

He died on 28 August 1991 in Madrid from a cancer at the age of 60.
