= Ramón Ruiz Alonso =

Spanish politician (1903-1982)

Ramón Ruiz Alonso (1903–1982) was a Spanish politician who was a right-wing activist during the Second Spanish Republic and typographer by trade. Married to actress Magdalena Penella, they had four daughters: Terele Pávez (1939–2017), Julia Ruiz Penella (1937–2017), Elisa Montés (b. 1934) and Emma Penella (1931–2007). He led the arrest and subsequent murder of the famous Spanish poet Federico García Lorca, on the 19th of August 1936.
