= Emma Penella =

Spanish actress

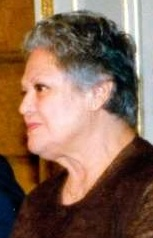
- Penella in 1996
- Born: Manuela Ruiz Penella; 2 March 1931; Madrid, Spain
- Died: 27 August 2007 (aged 76); Madrid, Spain
- Occupation: Actress
- Spouse: Emiliano Piedra (m. 1967; died 1991)
- Father: Ramón Ruiz Alonso
- Relatives: Elisa Montés (sister); Terele Pávez (sister); Manuel Penella (grandfather)

Manuela Ruiz Penella (2 March 1931 – 27 August 2007), better known as Emma Penella, was a Spanish film and television actress.

== Biography ==
Manuela Ruiz Penella was born on 2 March 1931 in Madrid, the child of far-right politician Ramón Ruiz Alonso and actress Magdalena Penella Silva, thus she was also the granddaughter of actor Manuel Penella Moreno. Her younger sisters Elisa ("Elisa Montés") and Teresa ("Terele Pávez") also followed the family's acting footsteps. The three sisters renounced to using the Ruiz family name as an artistic name, in the wake of their father's involvement in the murder of Federico García Lorca.

She featured in the 1952 film The Eyes Leave a Trace, ensuingly landing a larger degree of recognition with her performance in The Executioner.

She was named best actress by the Círculo de Escritores Cinematográficos for Sentencia contra una mujer in 1962.

In 1967, Emma Penella married producer Emiliano Piedra (died 1991).

She died on 27 August 2007 at aged 76 by a sepsis caused due to her diabetes.

== Selected filmography ==
- The Eyes Leave a Trace (José Luis Sáenz de Heredia, 1952).
- Carne de horca (Ladislao Vajda, 1953).
- What Madness! (1953)
- Doña Francisquita (Ladisalo Vajda, 1953)
- Cómicos (Juan Antonio Bardem, 1953).
- Adventures of the Barber of Seville (1954)
- The Red Fish (José Antonio Nieves Conde, 1955).
- Fedra (Manuel Mur Oti, 1956).
- The Battalion in the Shadows (Manuel Mur Oti, 1956).
- De espaldas a la puerta (José María Forqué, 1956).
- Back to the Door (1959)
- Sentencia contra una mujer (1960)
- El Verdugo (Luis García Berlanga, 1963).
- Fortunata y Jacinta (Angelino Fons, 1963).
- Golden Goddess of Rio Beni (1964)
- La regenta (Gonzalo Suárez, 1975).
- Padre nuestro (Francisco Regueiro, 1985).
- El Amor brujo (Carlos Saura, 1986).
- La estanquera de Vallecas (Eloy de la Iglesia, 1986).
- Doblones de a ocho (Andrés Linares, 1990).
- Mar de luna (Manolo Matji, 1994).
- Pídele cuentas al rey (1999).
- Los novios búlgaros (Bulgarian Lovers) (Eloy de la Iglesia, 2003).
- Aquí no hay quien viva (2003–2006) TV series
- La que se avecina (2007) TV series
