= El amor brujo (1986 film) =

1986 Spanish musical film directed by Carlos Saura

- Spanish film poster
- Directed by: Carlos Saura
- Written by: Carlos Saura; Antonio Gades
- Produced by: Emiliano Piedra
- Starring: Antonio Gades; Cristina Hoyos; Laura del Sol; Juan Antonio Jiménez; Emma Penella; La Polaca
- Cinematography: Teodoro Escamilla
- Edited by: Pablo del Rey
- Music by: Manuel de Falla
- Distributed by: Filmayer (Spain); Orion Classics (USA)
- Release date: December 23, 1986 (USA)
- Running time: 100 minutes
- Country: Spain
- Language: Spanish

El amor brujo (Love, the Magician, or Wedded by Witchcraft) or Carlos Saura Dance Trilogy, Part 3: El Amor Brujo is a 1986 Spanish musical film written and directed by Carlos Saura. It was directed and choreographed in the flamenco style by Maria Pagès. It is the third part of the Saura's flamenco trilogy he made in the 1980s, after Bodas de sangre in 1981 and Carmen in 1983. The film was screened out of competition at the 1986 Cannes Film Festival.

The film is based on El amor brujo composed by Manuel de Falla. He originally wrote for a gypsy troupe using a libretto by María de la O Lejárraga. The premiere in 1915 was not very successful and the composer reduced the amount of spoken dialogue, reworking the piece as a ballet.

== Plot summary ==
Candela, who is loved by Carmelo, marries José in a pre-arranged marriage decided by their respective fathers. José is in love with the flirtatious Lucía and dies defending her honor. Carmelo is mistakenly arrested for the killing, and spends several years in prison. After being released, he declares his love for Candela.

Although Candela is now "free" to marry Carmelo she is haunted (and obsessed) by the ghost of José, who reappears every night to dance with her. Candela, while speaking with Lucía, learns that José pursued her even after he married Candela. She renounces him, but is unable to shake his hold on her. Tía Rosario provides the solution - Lucia must dance with José, an act which will exorcise his ghost forever. It is never made clear if Lucía actually gives up her life to join him, but she never reappears in the film after their dance scene.

== Soundtrack ==
The film fleshed out the story with spoken dialogue and several songs, but used the entire score of the ballet. The Orquesta Nacional de España was conducted by Jesús López-Cobos. The singer heard on the soundtrack was the late Rocío Jurado. A soundtrack album, now out of print, was issued by EMI.

== Cast ==
- Antonio Gades as Carmelo
- Cristina Hoyos as Candela
- Laura del Sol as Lucía
- Juan Antonio Jiménez as José
- Emma Penella as Tía Rosario
- La Polaca as Pastora
- Gómez de Jerez as El Lobo/Cantaores
- Enrique Ortega as Padre de José
- Diego Pantoja as Padre de Candela
- Giovana as Rocío
- Maria Campano (as Mari Campano)
- Candy Román as Chulo
- Enrique Pantoja
- Manolo Sevilla as Cantaores
- Antonio Solera as Guitarrista
- Manuel Rodríguez as Guitarrista
- Juan Manuel Roldán as Guitarrista
