= Mariano Ozores =

Spanish film director and screenwriter (1926–2025)

- Born: Mariano Ozores Puchol; 5 October 1926; Madrid, Spain
- Died: 21 May 2025 (aged 98); Madrid, Spain
- Occupation(s): Film director, screenwriter
- Relatives: Antonio Ozores (brother) Adriana Ozores (niece)
- Awards: Honorary Goya Award (2015)

Mariano Ozores Puchol (5 October 1926 – 21 May 2025) was a Spanish film director and screenwriter. He was a prolific specialist in the sex comedy and Francoist comedy.

Ozores was the brother of José Luis Ozores (1923–1968) and Antonio Ozores (1928–2010), and the uncle of actresses Adriana Ozores and Emma Ozores. He was married and had one child.

He directed La que arman las mujeres (1969), Cuatro noches de boda (1969), Tío, ¿de verdad vienen de París? (1977), El liguero mágico (1980), and Agítese antes de usarla (1983).

Ozores died in Madrid on 21 May 2025, at the age of 98.

== Selected filmography ==
- The Dancer and the Worker (1936)
- Desert Warrior (1957)
- Night and Dawn (1958)
- The Daughters of Helena (1963)
- Forty Degrees in the Shade (1967)
- Operation Mata Hari (1968)
- La descarriada (1973)

== Bibliography ==
- Aguilar, Carlos; Genover, Jaume (1 January 1992). El cine español en sus intérpretes. BPR Publishers. p. 431. ISBN 9788460425090.
