= Father Cigarette (1955 film) =

1955 film

- Directed by: Juan de Orduña
- Written by: Carlos Arniches (play); Manuel Tamayo
- Produced by: Juan de Orduña
- Starring: Valeriano León; Virgílio Teixeira; Margarita Andrey
- Cinematography: José F. Aguayo
- Edited by: Antonio Cánovas
- Music by: Juan Quintero
- Production companies: Doperfilme; Orduna Films
- Distributed by: CIFESA
- Release date: 25 February 1955
- Running time: 92 minutes
- Countries: Portugal; Spain
- Language: Spanish

Father Cigarette (Spanish: El padre Pitillo) is a 1955 Spanish-Portuguese comedy film directed by Juan de Orduña and starring Valeriano León, Virgílio Teixeira and Margarita Andrey. It was based on a play by Carlos Arniches, which had previously been turned into a 1946 Chilean film of the same title.

The film's sets were designed by Sigfrido Burmann. It was released by the large CIFESA studio.

== Plot ==
Don Froilán, the grouchy priest of a small village, and his sister Camila help Rosita who has become pregnant and banned from return home by her step-father, while the responsible, the son of the richest family, is to be sent away to the city.

== Cast ==
- Valeriano León as Don Froilán 'Padre Pitillo'
- Virgílio Teixeira
- Margarita Andrey
- Aurora Redondo
- José Nieto
- José Sepúlveda
- Josefina Serratosa
- Ramón Martori
- Joan Capri
- Modesto Cid

== Bibliography ==
- Bentley, Bernard. A Companion to Spanish Cinema. Boydell & Brewer 2008.
