= Daughter of the Sea (1953 film) =

1953 film by Antonio Momplet

- Directed by: Antonio Momplet
- Written by: Francisco Bonmatí de Codecido; Àngel Guimerà (play); Juan Lladó; Marín A. López; José Antonio de la Loma
- Starring: Virgílio Teixeira; Isabel de Castro; Manuel Luna
- Cinematography: Emilio Foriscot
- Edited by: Ramon Quadreny
- Music by: Augusto Algueró
- Production company: IFI Producción
- Distributed by: CIFESA
- Release date: 11 December 1953
- Running time: 77 minutes
- Country: Spain
- Language: Spanish

Daughter of the Sea (Spanish: La hija del mar) is a 1953 Spanish drama film directed by Antonio Momplet and starring Virgílio Teixeira, Isabel de Castro and Manuel Luna. It is based on a play by Àngel Guimerà which had previously been turned into a 1917. It goes on about a girl who survives a boat crash and reaches an island where she is different from everyone. She falls in love and some tragedies occur.

== Synopsis ==
When old Antón died, he left his daughter, Mariona, and her goddaughter, Águeda, picked up in a shipwreck, under the care of Uncle Roque. This, insidiously, takes over all the assets of the deceased, turns Águeda into the Cinderella of the house and wants to force Mariona to marry her son Pablo de Ella. But Mariona maintains a secret relationship with Tomás Pedro, a fisherman who works for her uncle. So that no one suspects her, she hatches a stratagem to pretend that Tomás Pedro is in love with Águeda. Poor Cinderella believes it and, with her kindness and her natural charm, she really captivates Tomás Pedro. When Mariona found out about it, she caused Pablo's death and received her punishment at the hands of Uncle Roque.

== Cast ==
- Virgílio Teixeira as Tomás Pedro
- Isabel de Castro as Mariona
- Manuel Luna as Tío Roque
- Carlos Otero as Pablo
- Nicolás D. Perchicot as Sacerdote
- Jesús Colomer
- Ramona Cubexes
- Mercedes de la Aldea
- Emilio Fábregas
- Luis Induni
- Fernando Martínez
- Faustina Nieto
- María Luisa Parona
- Juana Soler

== Bibliography ==
- Bentley, Bernard. A Companion to Spanish Cinema. Boydell & Brewer 2008.
