= The Nightingale in the Mountains =

1958 film by Antonio del Amo

- Spanish: El ruiseñor de las cumbres
- Directed by: Antonio del Amo
- Written by: Jaime García-Herranz
- Produced by: Cesáreo González
- Starring: Joselito; Roberto Camardiel; Dolores Villaespesa
- Cinematography: Juan Mariné
- Edited by: Petra de Nieva
- Music by: Augusto Algueró
- Production companies: Argos P.C. Suevia Films
- Distributed by: Suevia Films
- Release date: 15 December 1958
- Running time: 86 minutes
- Country: Spain
- Language: Spanish

The Nightingale in the Mountains (Spanish: El ruiseñor de las cumbres) is a 1958 Spanish musical film directed by Antonio del Amo and starring Joselito, Roberto Camardiel and Dolores Villaespesa. Written by Jaime Garcia-Herranz with the original title of Once upon a time there was a shepherd (Spanish: Era una vez un pastor) it is the last film of what was called the Nightingale trilogy, which included The Little Nightingale (Spanish: El Pequeño Ruiseñor) (1956) and The Song of the Nightingale (Spanish: Saeta del ruiseñor) (1957).

The film's sets were designed by Enrique Alarcón. It was filmed in the Spanish locations of Alcalá de la Selva and Mora de Rubielos, as per the insistence of the writer, Jaime Garcia-Herranz, natural of Mora de Rubielos.

== Plot ==
Joselito is a boy, with a prodigious voice, who spends most of his time in the mountains taking care of a flock of sheep. One fine day he discovers that the fruit of his work ends in drunkenness for his father and decides to try his luck in life through music, for which he associates with the cunning Peppino.

== Cast ==
- Joselito as Joselito
- Roberto Camardiel as Peppino
- Dolores Villaespesa as Manuela, Joselito's mother
- Antonio Casas as Sebastián, Joselito's father
- Aníbal Vela as owner of the villa
- Félix Fernández as Dueño puesto de feria
- José Moratalla as Crispín
- Adela Carboné
- Domingo Rivas as Don Javier
- Rosa Fúster
- Juan García Delgado as Alcalde
- Juana Cáceres as owner's wife
- José Cuenca as Sr. Félix
- Francisco Gómez Delgado as doctor
- Emilia Zambrano
- Mery Leyva as Camarera
- María Teresa Campos as visitor at the villa
- Carmelo G. Robledo
- José Mayordomo
