= Jeromin =

- Directed by: Luis Lucia
- Written by: José Luis Colina; Luis Coloma (novel); Luis Lucia
- Starring: Jaime Blanch; Ana Mariscal; Rafael Durán
- Cinematography: Cecilio Paniagua
- Edited by: José Antonio Rojo
- Music by: Juan Quintero
- Production company: Producciones Cinematográficas Ariel
- Distributed by: CIFESA
- Release date: 19 December 1953
- Running time: 95 minutes
- Country: Spain
- Language: Spanish

Jeromin is a 1953 Spanish historical drama film directed by Luis Lucia and starring Jaime Blanch, Ana Mariscal and Rafael Durán. It portrays the early life of John of Austria.

== Cast ==
- Jaime Blanch as Don Juan de Austria 'Jeromín'
- Ana Mariscal as Doña Magdalena de Ulloa
- Rafael Durán as Don Luis de Quijada
- Jesús Tordesillas as Carlos V
- Adolfo Marsillach as Felipe II
- Antonio Riquelme as Diego Ruiz
- Valeriano Andrés
- Manuel Arbó
- Francisco Bernal
- Irene Caba Alba
- Ana de Leyva
- Adela Carboné
- Ramón Elías
- Casimiro Hurtado
- Quico Juanes
- Delia Luna as Beatriz
- Arturo Marín
- Nicolás D. Perchicot
- Luis Pérez de León
- José Sepúlveda

== Bibliography ==
- Bentley, Bernard. A Companion to Spanish Cinema. Boydell & Brewer, 2008.
