= The Captain's Ship =

- Directed by: Florián Rey
- Written by: Ricardo Baroja (novel); Manuel Tamayo
- Produced by: Cesáreo González
- Starring: Paola Barbara; Manuel Luna; José Nieto
- Cinematography: Manuel Berenguer
- Edited by: Bienvenida Sanz
- Music by: Conrado del Campo; Guadalupe Martínez del Castillo
- Production company: Suevia Films
- Distributed by: Suevia Films
- Release date: 29 September 1947
- Running time: 87 minutes
- Country: Spain
- Language: Spanish

The Captain's Ship (Spanish: La nao capitana) is a 1947 Spanish historical drama film directed by Florián Rey and starring Paola Barbara, Manuel Luna and José Nieto. The film's sets were designed by the art director Sigfrido Burmann.

== Main cast ==
- Paola Barbara as Doña Estrella
- Manuel Luna as El Fugitivo
- José Nieto as Capitán Diego Ruiz
- Raquel Rodrigo as Doña Leonor
- Jorge Mistral as Martín Villalba
- Rafael Calvo as Fray Gutiérrez
- Dolores Valcárcel as Doña Trinidad
- Fernando Fernández de Córdoba as Fray José
- Jesús Tordesillas as Don Antonio
- José María Lado as Maestre Barrios
- Manuel Dicenta
- Nicolás D. Perchicot
- José Jaspe
- Manuel Requena as Profesor de esgrima
- Nati Mistral as Cantante en el paso del Ecuador

== Bibliography ==
- D'Lugo, Marvin. Guide to the Cinema of Spain. Greenwood Publishing Group, 1997.
