= A New Play =

1946 film

- Directed by: Juan de Orduña
- Written by: Juan de Orduña
- Based on: A New Play by Manuel Tamayo y Baus
- Starring: Irasema Dilián; Roberto Font; Jesús Tordesillas
- Cinematography: Willy Goldberger
- Edited by: Mariano Pombo
- Music by: Juan Quintero
- Production companies: Juan de Orduña, P.C.
- Distributed by: CEA Distribución
- Release date: 25 November 1946
- Running time: 92 minutes
- Country: Spain
- Language: Spanish

A New Play (Spanish: Un drama nuevo) is a 1946 historical drama film directed by Juan de Orduña and starring Irasema Dilián, Roberto Font and Jesús Tordesillas. It was shot at the CEA Studios in Madrid. The film's sets were designed by the art director Sigfrido Burmann. It is based on the 1867 play of the same title by Manuel Tamayo y Baus.

== Synopsis ==
In Jacobean London, William Shakespeare's company stage a new tragedy. Shakespeare allows the fool Yorick to play the lead, before realising that the new play's theme of jealousy of a spouse closely resembles that of Yorick and his wife Alicia.

== Cast ==
- Irasema Dilián as Alicia
- Roberto Font as Yorick
- Jesús Tordesillas as Shakespeare
- Manuel Luna as Walton
- Julio Peña as Edmundo
- Gabriel Algara as Conde de Southampton
- Ricardo Acero as El autor
- Fernando Aguirre as El apuntador
- Antonio Casas as Jorge
- José Franco as Lord
- Mary Rosa as dancer
- Nicolás D. Perchicot as Pedro

== Bibliography ==
- De España, Rafael. Directory of Spanish and Portuguese film-makers and films. Greenwood Press, 1994.
- Pujante, Angel-Luis & Hoenselaars, A. J. Four Hundred Years of Shakespeare in Europe. University of Delaware Press, 2003.
