= I'm Not Mata Hari =

- Directed by: Benito Perojo
- Written by: Miguel Mihura
- Produced by: Manuel Rosellón; Benito Perojo
- Starring: Niní Marshall; Roberto Font; Virgílio Teixeira
- Cinematography: Manuel Berenguer
- Edited by: María Paredes
- Music by: Juan Quintero
- Production company: Paloma-Ares Films
- Release date: 1949
- Running time: 110 minutes
- Country: Spain
- Language: Spanish

I'm Not Mata Hari (Spanish: Yo no soy la Mata-Hari) is a 1949 Spanish comedy spy film directed by Benito Perojo and starring Niní Marshall, Roberto Font and Virgílio Teixeira. The film's sets were designed by the art director Sigfrido Burmann. The film's title refers to Mata Hari, the First World War-era spy.

== Cast ==
- Niní Marshall as Niní / agenteX25 / Carmiña / Surabaya
- Roberto Font as Michel
- Virgílio Teixeira as Richard / Tte. Jorjof
- Rafael Calvo as Bonnard - jefe servicios secretos
- Francisco Pierrá as Durand
- Ramón Martori as Renoir
- Rosita Valero as Carmela
- Trini Montero as Princesa Jesusa
- Xan das Bolas as Don Cosme Fernández
- Manuel San Román as Señor X
- Manuel de Juan as Worsikoff
- Fernando Aguirre as Basilio
- Rafael Bardem as Gerente del hotel polaco
- Julia Caba Alba as Mujer en el tren
- Pepito Goyanes as Niño espía X110
- Marisa de Leza as Corista
- José Durantes
- Matilde Muñoz Sampedro
- Manuel Requena
- Rafael Romero Marchent
- Tomás Blanco as Richard disfrazado

== Bibliography ==
- Bentley, Bernard. A Companion to Spanish Cinema. Boydell & Brewer 2008.
