= Lola the Coalgirl =

1952 film

- Directed by: Luis Lucia
- Written by: José María Pemán (play); Luis Lucia; José Luis Colina; Ricardo Blasco
- Starring: Juanita Reina; Virgílio Teixeira; Manuel Luna
- Cinematography: Theodore J. Pahle
- Edited by: Juan Serra
- Music by: Juan Quintero Muñoz
- Production company: CIFESA
- Distributed by: CIFESA
- Release date: 3 March 1952
- Running time: 89 minutes
- Country: Spain
- Language: Spanish

Lola the Coalgirl (Spanish: Lola, la piconera) is a 1952 Spanish historical musical film directed by Luis Lucia and starring Juanita Reina, Virgílio Teixeira and Manuel Luna.

It was part of a series of patriotic historical films produced by CIFESA, Spain's biggest film company of the era. Other examples include Madness for Love (1948) and Agustina of Aragon. The film's sets were designed by the German-born art director Sigfrido Burmann. Shooting began in June 1950, with filming at a Madrid studio and on location in Cádiz.

On release, the film was a moderate hit but because of its large budget it had not returned all of its costs several years later.

== Synopsis ==
During the Siege of Cádiz a female Spanish innkeeper falls in love with an officer of Napoleon's invading army.

== Cast ==
- Juanita Reina as Lola
- Virgílio Teixeira as Capitán Gustavo Lefevre
- Manuel Luna as Mariscal Víctor
- Fernando Nogueras as Rafael Otero
- Félix Dafauce as Juan de Acuña
- Fernando Fernández de Córdoba as General Alburquerque
- Alberto Romea as Salazar
- Arturo Marín as Jefe de los gitanos
- José Isbert as Soldado José Rodríguez
- Nicolás D. Perchicot as Ventero
- Antonio Riquelme as Domingo Carmona
- Miguel Pastor as Venegas
- Valeriano Andrés as Teniente Jouvert
- Francisco Bernal as Gerard
- Alfonso de Córdoba as Lacour
- Casimiro Hurtado as Zapatero
- Domingo Rivas as Oficial de alistamiento
- Manuel Guitián as Ujier de las cortes
- José Guardiola as Gallardo
- Concha López Silva as Gitana vieja
- Ana Esmeralda as 'Bailaora' gitana
- José Toledano as 'Bailaor' Gitano

== Bibliography ==
- Mira, Alberto. The Cinema of Spain and Portugal. Wallflower Press, 2005.
