= Joselito =

Joselito is the name for:

First name / given name

- Joselito (singer), Spanish 1950s child actor and singer
- Joselito Agustin (1976–2010), also known as Aksyon Lito, Filipino journalist
- Joselito Altarejos, Filipino film and television director, producer
- Joselito Pimentel, better known as Lito Pimentel, Filipino film and television actor
- Joselito Vaca, Bolivian football midfielder

Known as Joselito

- Jojo Duncil, real name Joselito Duncil, (born 1983), Filipino professional basketball player
- José Gómez Ortega, a.k.a. Joselito, Spanish matador
- José Romero Jiménez, a.k.a. Joselito, Spanish football forward
- Lito Atienza, full name José Livioko Atienza, Jr., a.k.a. Joselito Atienza, Filipino politician, former city mayor of Manila

== See also ==
- Joselito vagabundo, 1965 Mexican film
