= Follow the Legion =

- Theatrical film poster
- Spanish: ¡A mí la legión!
- Directed by: Juan de Orduña
- Written by: Raúl Cancio; Jaime Garcia-Herranz; Luis Lucia
- Starring: Alfredo Mayo; Luis Peña; Manuel Luna
- Cinematography: Alfredo Fraile
- Edited by: Antonio Cánovas
- Music by: Juan Quintero
- Production company: Cifesa
- Distributed by: Cifesa
- Release date: 11 May 1942
- Running time: 82 minutes
- Country: Spain
- Language: Spanish

Follow the Legion (Spanish: ¡A mí la legión!) is a 1942 Spanish drama film directed by Juan de Orduña and starring Alfredo Mayo, Luis Peña and Manuel Luna.

== Plot ==
Set in North Africa and in the Legion, it shows the friendship between soldiers, which leads 'El Grajo' to investigate a murder to exonerate a comrade-in-arms and friend. Exaltation of a model soldier of the time in Spain and of the so-called 'military values'.

== Sign ==
The film poster was made by José Peris Aragó in a 105.5 x 72 cm format. In it, you can see El Grajo and Mauro (of whom only his head is shown) dressed in military dress shown in the background with the Spanish flags waving.

== Reception ==
A critic from Fotogramas magazine commented on her that "she is the mythical legionnaire that had so much prestige during the Franco regime and that some nostalgics continue to yearn for."

== Cast ==
- Alfredo Mayo as Jackdaw
- Luis Peña as Mauro
- Manuel Luna as commander
- Miguel Pozanco as worker
- Pilar Soler as Leda
- Manuel Arbó as Ionescu
- Rufino Inglés as Captain Romero
- Fortunato Bernal as Rodete
- Arturo Marín as Samual
- Fred Galiana as legionary Rodriguez
- Miguel Pastor as legionary in a trench
- José Sanchiz as Lieutenant in a bar
