= The Reprieve (1961 film) =

- Directed by: José Luis Sáenz de Heredia
- Written by: Emilia Pardo Bazán; José Luis Sáenz de Heredia
- Starring: Pedro Armendáriz; Concha Velasco; Manuel Monroy
- Cinematography: Cecilio Paniagua
- Edited by: Sara Ontañón
- Music by: Salvador Ruiz de Luna
- Production company: Suevia Films
- Distributed by: Metro-Goldwyn-Mayer Ibérica
- Release date: 7 August 1961
- Running time: 105 minutes
- Country: Spain
- Language: Spanish

The Reprieve (Spanish: El indulto) is a 1961 Spanish drama film directed by José Luis Sáenz de Heredia and starring Pedro Armendáriz, Concha Velasco and Manuel Monroy.

The film's sets were designed by Sigfrido Burmann.

== Cast ==
- Pedro Armendáriz as Lucas
- Concha Velasco as Antonia
- Manuel Monroy as Pedro
- Eulália del Pino as Basilia
- Antonio Garisa as Pepe, el abogado
- Guadalupe Muñoz Sampedro as Doña Benita
- Rafael de Penagos
- Fernando Sancho as Preso
- José María Seoane
- Pedro Porcel
- Mercedes Muñoz Sampedro
- Adriano Domínguez
- María Isbert
- José María Caffarel as Defensor
- Luis Marín
- Narciso Ojeda
- Xan das Bolas
- Erasmo Pascual
- Manuel Guitián
- Rafaela Aparicio as Pastelera
- Jesús Puente as Guardia de la prisión
- Ricardo Canales
- Alfonso Rojas
- Luis Rivera
- Paula Martel
- Ángel del Pozo as Cecilio
- Rafael Bardem
- José Calvo
- Antonio Alfonso Vidal
- Francisco Bernal
- Luis Induni as Médico
- Pablo Lastra
- Joaquín Bergía
- Antonio Jiménez Escribano
- José Riesgo
- María Zaldívar
- Jerónimo Monteo
- Salvador Muñoz
- Antonio de Armenteras
- José Manuel Pinillos
- Emilio González
- José María Lado
- Porfiria Sanchíz

== Bibliography ==
- Bentley, Bernard. A Companion to Spanish Cinema. Boydell & Brewer, 2008.
