= The Twin Girls =

- Directed by: Antonio del Amo
- Written by: Camilo Murillo; Concha R. Castaño; Jaime de Armiñán; Antonio del Amo
- Produced by: Antonio del Amo
- Starring: Maleni Castro; José Bódalo; Helga Liné
- Cinematography: José F. Aguayo
- Edited by: Petra de Nieva
- Music by: Antonio Areta
- Production company: Apolo Films
- Distributed by: CIFESA
- Release date: 20 May 1963
- Running time: 92 minutes
- Country: Spain
- Language: Spanish

The Twin Girls (Spanish: Las gemelas) is a 1963 Spanish musical film directed by Antonio del Amo and starring Maleni Castro, José Bódalo and Helga Liné.

The film's sets were designed by Sigfrido Burmann.

== Cast ==
- Maleni Castro as Ana Carrasco / Maria Carrasco
- José Bódalo as Raphael Carrasco Ramírez
- Helga Liné
- Maite Blasco
- Raphael as himself - Singer
- Antonio Vela as Gonzalo, Maria's Boyfriend
- Mari Pili Baizán as Pili, Maria's Friend
- Porfiria Sanchíz
- Lina Yegros as Elena
- Antonio Gandía
- Fernando Liger
- Antonio Moreno as Don Carlos
- Jacinto San Emeterio
- José del Moral
- Paul Ellis
- Tito García
- Paulina Almeida
- María del Carmen Ruiz
- Maribel Hidalgo
- Luis Dávila as Doctor

== Bibliography ==
- de España, Rafael. Directory of Spanish and Portuguese film-makers and films. Greenwood Press, 1994.
