= Woman to Woman (1950 film) =

1950 film

- Directed by: Luis Lucia
- Written by: Antonio Abad Ojuel; Jacinto Benavente; Ricardo Blasco; Luis Lucia
- Starring: Amparo Rivelles; Ana Mariscal; Eduardo Fajardo
- Cinematography: Alfredo Fraile
- Edited by: Juan Serra
- Music by: Juan Quintero
- Production company: CIFESA
- Distributed by: CIFESA
- Release date: 13 September 1950
- Running time: 85 minutes
- Country: Spain
- Language: Spanish

Woman to Woman (Spanish: De mujer a mujer) is a 1950 Spanish historical drama film directed and co-written by Luis Lucia and starring Amparo Rivelles, Ana Mariscal and Eduardo Fajardo. It was not very successful at the box office. It is set in the nineteenth century, and was part of a group of costume films released by Spain's biggest studio CIFESA during the period.

The film portrays the emotional bond that develops between the wife and the mistress of a man.

== Plot ==
After a family disgrace Isabel needs internment in a mental residence. Her nurse will be her confident, the link to her husband and the outside world.

== Cast ==
- Amparo Rivelles as Isabel
- Ana Mariscal as Enfermera Emilia
- Eduardo Fajardo as Luis
- Manuel Luna as Padre Víctor
- Mariano Asquerino as Pediatra
- Francisco Bernal as José, cochero
- Irene Caba Alba as Enferma mental 1
- Lola del Pino as Soledad, a maid
- Fernando Fernández de Córdoba as Doctor Hernández
- Manolo Fábregas as Javier
- Manuel Guitián as Herrero
- Juana Mansó as Enferma mental 2
- Arturo Marín as Viandante
- Eloísa Muro as Vicenta - Isabel's mother
- Antonio Riquelme as Gutiérrez
- Rosario Royo as enfermera Adela
- Selica Torcal as Maribel
- Jesús Tordesillas as Antonio - Isabel's father

== Bibliography ==
- Mira, Alberto. The Cinema of Spain and Portugal. Wallflower Press, 2005.
