= The Other Life of Captain Contreras =

- Directed by: Rafael Gil
- Written by: Vicente Escrivá; Ramón D. Faraldo; Rafael Gil; Torcuato Luca de Tena (novel)
- Produced by: Cesáreo González; Pedro Luis Ramírez
- Cinematography: Alfredo Fraile
- Edited by: José Antonio Rojo
- Music by: Juan Quintero
- Production company: Suevia Films
- Distributed by: Suevia Films
- Release date: 1 February 1955
- Running time: 79 minutes
- Country: Spain
- Language: Spanish

The Other Life of Captain Contreras (Spanish: La otra vida del capitán Contreras) is a 1955 Spanish comedy film directed by Rafael Gil.

== Synopsis ==
Spain, 16th century: The brave captain Alonso Contreras is menaced by the inquisition, but he is not guilty. An alchemist, trying to help, gives Alonso a powerful potion in order to make him sleep until the danger flies. The potion is too much powerful and Alonso wakes up in the 20th century.

The plot is similar to Mel Gibson's film Forever Young.

== Cast ==
- Fernando Fernán Gómez as Alonso Contreras
- Julio F. Alymán as Román
- Francisco Arenzana as Fiscal
- María Asquerino as Paca Revilla
- Mariano Azaña
- Germán Cobos
- Félix de Pomés as Marqués del Darro
- Juan Domenech as Moñudo
- Ramón Elías
- Tony Hernández as Luigi
- Luis Hurtado
- Rufino Inglés
- Manuel Kayser
- José Manuel Martín
- Virginia de Matos
- Sergio Mendizábal
- Antonio Molino Rojo
- Antonio Moreno
- Mónica Pastrana
- Maria Piazzai as Silvia
- Matías Prats
- Manuel Requena
- Antonio Riquelme
- Luis Rivera
- Fernando Sancho as Antonio Cornejo
- Carlos Miguel Solá
- Amparo Soto

== Bibliography ==
- de España, Rafael. Directory of Spanish and Portuguese film-makers and films. Greenwood Press, 1994.
