= He Died Fifteen Years Ago =

1954 film

- Directed by: Rafael Gil
- Written by: José Antonio Giménez-Arnau (play); Vicente Escrivá; Ramón D. Faraldo
- Produced by: Cesáreo González
- Starring: Rafael Rivelles; Francisco Rabal; Lyla Rocco
- Cinematography: Alfredo Fraile; Heinrich Gartner; Pablo Ripoll
- Edited by: José Antonio Rojo
- Music by: Cristóbal Halffter
- Production companies: Aspa Producciones Cinematográficas; Cesáreo González Producciones Cinematográficas
- Distributed by: Suevia Films
- Release date: 4 October 1954
- Running time: 101 minutes
- Country: Spain
- Language: Spanish

He Died Fifteen Years Ago (Spanish: Murió hace quince años) is a 1954 Spanish drama film directed by Rafael Gil and starring Rafael Rivelles, Francisco Rabal and Lyla Rocco.

== Synopsis ==
Diego Acuña was one of the children transferred to the Soviet Union during the Spanish Civil War and educated in communism and prepared to act as an international spy. Among his destinations are France and Italy, where he will work under the command of Germán Goeritz. After several years he is entrusted with a mission in Spain, in which he must collaborate in the murder of his father, an important opponent of communism.

== Cast ==
- Rafael Rivelles as Coronel Acuña
- Francisco Rabal as Diego
- Lyla Rocco as Mónica
- Gérard Tichy as Germán Goeritz
- Carmen Rodríguez as Cándida
- Ricardo Calvo as Daniel
- Fernando Sancho as Joaquín Campos
- Félix de Pomés as Jefe de policía
- Antonio Prieto as Ramón Iranzo
- José Manuel Martín as Muñoz
- Porfiria Sanchíz as Profesora
- Carlos Acevedo as Diego, de niño
- María Dolores Pradera as Cantante
- Maria Piazzai as Irene
- Gabriel Alcover as Primer agente en El Escorial
- Juan José Alcón as Diego, de joven
- Adela Carboné as Vieja
- Álvarez de Quindós as Doctor
- Ramón D. Faraldo as Professor
- Rufino Inglés as Segundo agente en El Escorial
- Damián Rabal as Marinero
- Pedro Luis Ramírez as Viajero del avión
- Luis Rivera as Maitre
- Jacinto San Emeterio as Agente del aeropuerto
- Carlos Miguel Solá as Agente en el caserón

== Bibliography ==
- Bentley, Bernard. A Companion to Spanish Cinema. Boydell & Brewer 2008.
