= Gloria Mairena =

1952 film

- Directed by: Luis Lucia
- Written by: Jorge de la Cueva (play); José de la Cueva (play); Luis Lucia; Ricardo Blasco; José Luis Colina
- Produced by: Juanita Reina
- Starring: Juanita Reina; Eduardo Fajardo; Rafael Arcos
- Cinematography: Cecilio Paniagua
- Edited by: José Antonio Rojo
- Music by: Juan Quintero
- Production company: Producciones Reina
- Distributed by: Cifesa
- Release date: 19 December 1952
- Running time: 80 minutes
- Country: Spain
- Language: Spanish

Gloria Mairena is a 1952 Spanish drama film directed by Luis Lucia and starring Juanita Reina, Eduardo Fajardo and Rafael Arcos. It was released by Cifesa, Spain's leading studio of the period. The film's sets were designed by the art director Gil Parrondo.

== Synopsis ==
In Seville, a man loses his wife after two years of marriage and turns to the priesthood. Their daughter grows up to look exactly like her mother, and he fears losing her in a similar way.

== Cast ==
- Juanita Reina as Gloria Mairena / Gloria Céspedes
- Eduardo Fajardo as Paulino Céspedes
- Ricardo Acero as Paco
- Rafael Arcos as Sebastián
- Francisco Bernal as Baldomero
- Ana de Leyva as Sagrario
- Manuel Guitián as Rector
- Valeriano Andrés as Don Buenaventura
- Mercedes Cora as Lina Álvarez
- María Teresa Reina as Gloria Céspedes niña
- Quico Juanes as Niño
- Jaime Blanch as Niño
- Rafael Calvo Revilla as Periodista
- Antonio García Quijada as Narrador
- Casimiro Hurtado as Cliente del tablao
- Manuel Luna as Self
- Arturo Marín as Cliente del tablao
- Teófilo Palou as Empresario

== Bibliography ==
- Hortelano, Lorenzo J. Torres. Directory of World Cinema: Spain. Intellect Books, 2011.
- Labanyi, Jo & Pavlović, Tatjana. A Companion to Spanish Cinema. John Wiley & Sons, 2012.
