= Whirlwind (1941 film) =

1941 film

- Directed by: Luis Marquina
- Written by: Arturo Marín; Manuel Gutiérrez Navas; Luis Marquina
- Starring: Estrellita Castro; Manuel Luna; Tony D'Algy; Manolo Morán
- Cinematography: Willy Goldberger
- Edited by: Margarita de Ochoa
- Music by: José Ruiz de Azagra
- Production company: CIFESA
- Distributed by: CIFESA
- Release date: 22 December 1941
- Running time: 104 minutes
- Country: Spain
- Language: Spanish

Whirlwind (Spanish: Torbellino) is a 1941 Spanish comedy film directed by Luis Marquina and starring Estrellita Castro, Manuel Luna and Tony D'Algy. It was made by Spain's largest film company of the era CIFESA.

== Synopsis ==
The young Sevillian Carmen arrives at a decrepit radio station that is going through bad times with the desire to succeed in this medium. Thanks to her, the station will get a highly rated prize.

== Cast ==
- Estrellita Castro as Carmen Moreno
- Manuel Luna as Segundo Izquierdo
- Tony D'Algy as Carlos Miranda
- Manolo Morán as Juan Barea
- Fernando Freyre de Andrade as Fermín Ibáñez
- Arturo Marín as Álvaro de Esquivias
- José Marco Davó as Portero
- Irene Caba Alba as Sra. Zaldívar
- Lily Vincenti as Carola Bianchi
- Camino Garrigó as Carmenchu
- Eva Arión as Alicia
- Xan das Bolas as Juan José
- Jesús Castro Blanco
- María Cuevas

== Bibliography ==
- Bentley, Bernard. A Companion to Spanish Cinema. Boydell & Brewer 2008.
