= The Song of the Nightingale =

The Song of the Nightingale may refer to:

- Le chant du rossignol (English: Song of the Nightingale), a 1921 poème symphonique by Igor Stravinsky
- The Song of the Nightingale (1944 film), a German musical drama film
- The Song of the Nightingale (1959 film), a Spanish musical film
