= Lola Leaves for the Ports =

1947 film

- Directed by: Juan de Orduña
- Written by: Antonio Mas Guindal; Antonio Machado (play); Manuel Machado (play); Juan de Orduña
- Produced by: Juan de Orduña
- Starring: Juanita Reina; Nani Fernández; Manuel Luna
- Cinematography: José F. Aguayo
- Edited by: Petra de Nieva
- Music by: Jesús García Leoz
- Production company: CIFESA
- Distributed by: CIFESA
- Release date: 29 December 1947
- Running time: 120 minutes
- Country: Spain
- Language: Spanish

Lola Leaves for the Ports (Spanish: La Lola se va a los puertos) is a 1947 Spanish historical musical drama film directed by Juan de Orduña and starring Juanita Reina, Nani Fernández and Manuel Luna. It is based on a 1929 play of the same title by Manuel and Antonio Machado.

== Synopsis ==
The action takes place in Andalusia in the 1860s. A carefree wandering female singer has many admirers in the coastal ports of the area. However, she falls deeply in love with a young man she meets.

== Cast ==
- Juanita Reina as Lola
- Nani Fernández as Rosario
- Manuel Luna as Heredia
- Ricardo Acero as José Luis
- Jesús Tordesillas as Don Diego
- Nicolás D. Perchicot as Willy
- Faustino Bretaño as Asaúra
- María Isbert as Criada
- Rafaela Rodríguez as Criada
- María Cañete as Mercedes
- María Cuevas as Santera
- Arturo Marín as Gitano
- Fernando Aguirre as Hombre en isla
- José María Mompín as Marinero 1
- Joaquín Pujol as Marqués
- Manuel Sabatini
- Antonio Riquelme as Calamares
- Conrado San Martín as Marinero 2
- Casimiro Hurtado as Paco
- Felipe Neri
- Rafael Romero Marchent as Curro Mairén
- Marina Torres as Enfermera
- Teófilo Palou as Doctor
- Manuel Dicenta as Panza Triste

== Reception ==
A critic from El Diario called it "close to perfection." A reviewer of Critica was more mixed, stating that they were "neither satisfied, nor disappointed."

== Bibliography ==
- Mira, Alberto. The Cinema of Spain and Portugal. Wallflower Press, 2005.
