= Antonio del Amo =

Spanish screenwriter and film director

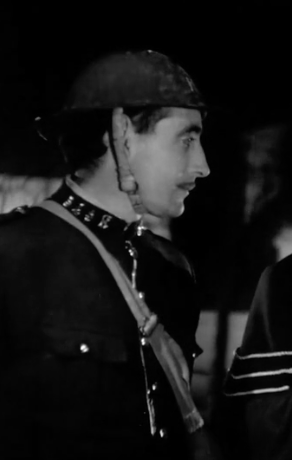
- Born: 9 September 1911; Madrid, Spain
- Died: 19 June 1991 (aged 79); Madrid, Spain
- Other name: Antonio del Amo Algara
- Occupations: Writer, Director
- Years active: 1937-1975 (film)

Antonio del Amo Algara (1911–1991) was a Spanish screenwriter and film director. He enjoyed great commercial success in 1956 with The Little Nightingale starring the child star Joselito. This allowed him to found his own production company Apolo Films, based outside Madrid.

== Selected filmography ==
- Four Women (1947)
- Guest of Darkness (1948)
- Ninety Minutes (1949)
- Wings of Youth (1949)
- Day by Day (1951)
- A Tale of Two Villages (1951)
- Devil's Roundup (1952)
- Women's Town (1953)
- Cursed Mountain (1954)
- The Fisher of Songs (1954)
- The Little Nightingale (1956)
- Return to the Truth (1956)
- The Sun Comes Out Every Day (1958)
- The Nightingale in the Mountains (1958)
- The Song of the Nightingale (1959)
- Listen To My Song (1959)
- Nothing Less Than an Archangel (1960)
- Peaches in Syrup (1960)
- The Little Colonel (1960)
- The Two Little Rascals (1961)
- Lovely Memory (1961)
- Boy or Girl? (1962)
- The Twin Girls (1963)
- Tomy's Secret (1963)
- Three Sparrows and a Bit (1964)
- Our Man in Jamaica (1965)
- Jesse James' Kid (1965)
- A Dog in Space (1966)
- Requiem for a Secret Agent (1966)
- I Must Abandon You (1969)
- Unmarried Mothers (1975)

== Bibliography ==
- Bentley, Bernard. A Companion to Spanish Cinema. Boydell & Brewer 2008.
- D'Lugo, Marvin. Guide to the Cinema of Spain. Greenwood Publishing, 1997.
