= The Lioness of Castille =

1951 film

- Directed by: Juan de Orduña
- Written by: Francisco Villaespesa (play); Vicente Escrivá; Juan de Orduña
- Starring: Amparo Rivelles; Virgílio Teixeira; Alfredo Mayo; Manuel Luna
- Cinematography: Alfredo Fraile
- Edited by: Petra de Nieva
- Music by: Juan Quintero
- Production company: CIFESA
- Distributed by: CIFESA
- Release date: 28 May 1951
- Running time: 106 minutes
- Country: Spain
- Language: Spanish

The Lioness of Castille (Spanish: La leona de Castilla) is a 1951 Spanish historical drama film directed by Juan de Orduña and starring Amparo Rivelles, Virgílio Teixeira and Alfredo Mayo. De Orduña had directed a number of the most expensive Spanish costume films of the era for the leading studio CIFESA. The film portrays the sixteenth century noblewoman María Pacheco, in a fictitious story that has her battling foreign agents during the reign of Charles V.

== Synopsis ==
After his defeat in the Battle of Villalar, Juan de Padilla, chief of the comuneros, is executed by beheading together with Juan Bravo and Francisco Maldonado in the presence of his wife María de Pacheco and his son. After that they swear, before the Council of the city of Toledo, to avenge her death and continue the war against Carlos I. She is a Castilian lady of high rank, with fragile health but strong character who reacts heroically and participates in dangerous combats against the tyranny of King Carlos I, becoming the Leona de Castilla, a symbol of oppressed popular freedoms.

== Cast ==
- Amparo Rivelles as María de Pacheco
- Virgílio Teixeira as Pedro de Guzmán
- Alfredo Mayo as Manrique
- Manuel Luna as Ramiro
- Eduardo Fajardo as Tovar
- Rafael Romero Marchent as Juan de Padilla hijo
- Antonio Casas as Juan de Padilla
- Laly del Amo as Doña Isabel
- María Cañete as Sirvienta de María de Pacheco
- Nicolás D. Perchicot as Cura en ejecución
- Alberto Romea as Arzobispo
- Manuel Arbó as Noble toledano
- Francisco Pierrá as Noble toledano
- José Jaspe as Juan Bravo
- Teófilo Palou as Francisco Maldonado
- Domingo Rivas as Noble toledano
- Santiago Rivero as Líder de los Imperiales
- Jesús Tordesillas as Don López
- Faustino Bretaño
- Adriano Dominguez
- Miguel Pastor
- Arturo Marín
- Antonio Riquelme
- Luis Peña padre
- Rafael Cortés
- Carlos Osorio
- José Buhigas
- Ángel Monís
- César Guzman
- Germán Cobos
- Luis Fernandez
- Eduardo Bonada
- Francisco Maroto

== Bibliography ==
- Bentley, Bernard P. E. (2008). A Companion to Spanish Cinema. Boydell & Brewer Ltd. ISBN 978-1-85566-176-9.
