= The Sun Comes Out Every Day =

- Directed by: Antonio del Amo
- Written by: Juan Antonio Cabezas; Jaime García-Herranz; Juan Manuel Vega Picó; Antonio Vich; Antonio del Amo
- Starring: Marisa de Leza; Enrique Diosdado; Mercedes Monterrey
- Cinematography: José F. Aguayo
- Edited by: Petra de Nieva
- Music by: Jesús García Leoz; Mario Medina
- Production company: Argos P.C.
- Distributed by: Suevia Films
- Release date: 20 January 1958
- Running time: 92 minutes
- Country: Spain
- Language: Spanish

The Sun Comes Out Every Day (Spanish:El sol sale todos los días) is a 1958 Spanish comedy film directed by Antonio del Amo and starring Marisa de Leza, Enrique Diosdado and Mercedes Monterrey.

The film's sets were designed by Enrique Alarcón.

== Cast ==
- Marisa de Leza as Lina
- Enrique Diosdado as Diógenes
- Mercedes Monterrey as Teresa
- Barta Barrias Pelotti
- Luis Pérez de León as Sr. Román
- Francisco Bernal as Portero del hospital
- Daja-Tarto as Ravi Ramátraka
- Manuel Aguilera as Guardia civil
- Aníbal Vela as Alcalde
- Manuel Guitián as Trabajador en feria
- Ángel Calero
- Ernesto Lerín
- Enrique Bendicho
- Matilde Guarnerio
- Rodolfo del Campo
- Guillermo Méndez
- Miguel Ángel Rodríguez as Gorrión

== Bibliography ==
- D'Lugo, Marvin. Guide to the Cinema of Spain. Greenwood Publishing, 1997.
