= The Little Colonel (1960 film) =

- Directed by: Antonio del Amo
- Written by: Luis Antonio Ruiz; Antonio del Amo
- Produced by: Cesáreo González
- Starring: Joselito; Carlos Larrañaga; María Mahor
- Cinematography: Alfredo Fraile
- Edited by: Petra de Nieva
- Production company: Suevia Films
- Distributed by: Excisa S.A.
- Release date: 14 December 1960
- Running time: 85 minutes
- Country: Spain
- Language: Spanish

The Little Colonel (Spanish: El pequeño coronel) is a 1960 Spanish historical musical film directed by Antonio del Amo and starring Joselito, Carlos Larrañaga and María Mahor.

== Cast ==
- Joselito as Joselito Alvear
- Carlos Larrañaga as Teniente Eduardo Aranda
- María Mahor as Teresa, hija del corregidor
- Tomás Blanco as Don Martín Alvear
- Jesús Tordesillas as Don Esteban
- Fernando Sancho as Vinagre
- Rafael López Somoza as Buenafacha, jefe de la Banda del Cucú
- Ángel Ter
- Antonio Gandía
- Kin
- José Luis Carbonell
- Inocencio Barbán
- Carmen Rodríguez as Doña Adela
- José María Martín
- Manuel Arbó
- Julia Pachelo
- José Cuenca
- Domingo Rivas
- Pedro Oliver
- Paul Ellis
- Luis Moreno
- Lázaro Pérez Romero
- José Guardiola
- José Nieto

== Bibliography ==
- de España, Rafael. Directory of Spanish and Portuguese film-makers and films. Greenwood Press, 1994.
