= The Two Little Rascals =

- Directed by: Antonio del Amo
- Written by: Emilio Canda; José Manuel Iglesias; Luis Antonio Ruiz; Antonio del Amo
- Produced by: Antonio Cuevas
- Starring: Joselito; Maria Piazzai; Luz Márquez
- Cinematography: Juan Mariné
- Edited by: Petra de Nieva
- Music by: Manuel Parada
- Production company: Suevia Films
- Distributed by: Suevia Films
- Release date: 1 September 1961
- Country: Spain
- Language: Spanish

The Two Little Rascals (Spanish: Los dos golfillos) is a 1961 Spanish drama film directed by Antonio del Amo and starring Joselito, Maria Piazzai and Luz Márquez.

The film's sets were designed by Sigfrido Burmann.

== Cast ==
- Joselito
- Maria Piazzai
- Luz Márquez
- José Marco
- Ismael Elma
- Porfiria Sanchíz
- Erasmo Pascual
- Rosa Fúster
- Manuel Rojas
- Rufino Inglés
- Emilio González
- José Palomo
- Mario Bustos
- Camino Delgado
- Salvador Muñoz
- Conchita Gómez Rabadán
- Agustín Fisac
- Carmen Villa
- José A. Maldonado
- Antonio Tamayo
- Antonio Prieto
- Pablito Alonso

== Bibliography ==
- de España, Rafael. Directory of Spanish and Portuguese film-makers and films. Greenwood Press, 1994.
