= Currito of the Cross (1949 film) =

1949 film

- Directed by: Luis Lucia
- Written by: Alejandro Pérez Lugín (novel); Antonio Abad Ojuel; Luis Lucia
- Starring: Pepín Martín Vázquez; Jorge Mistral; Manuel Luna; Nati Mistral
- Cinematography: José F. Aguayo
- Edited by: Juan Serra
- Music by: Juan Quintero
- Production company: CIFESA
- Distributed by: CIFESA
- Release date: 5 January 1949
- Running time: 98 minutes
- Country: Spain
- Language: Spanish

Currito of the Cross (Spanish: Currito de la Cruz) is a 1949 Spanish drama film directed by Luis Lucia and starring Pepín Martín Vázquez, Jorge Mistral and Manuel Luna. It was the third film adaptation of the novel of the same title by Alejandro Pérez Lugín.

== Cast ==
- Pepín Martín Vázquez as Currito de la Cruz
- Jorge Mistral as Ángel Romera 'Romerita'
- Manuel Luna as Manuel Carmona
- Nati Mistral as Rocío
- Tony Leblanc as Gazuza
- Juan Espantaleón as Don Ismael
- Félix Fernandez as Copita
- Amparo Martí as Sor María
- Francisco Bernal as Banderillero de Romerita
- Eloísa Muro as Teresa
- Arturo Marín as Marqués
- Rosario Royo as Manuela
- Manuel Requena as El Gordo
- María Isbert as Margaret
- José Prada as Doctor
- Alicia Torres
- Santiago Rivero as Miembro cuadrilla Carmona

== Bibliography ==
- Bentley, Bernard. A Companion to Spanish Cinema. Boydell & Brewer 2008.
