= The Legion of Silence =

- Directed by: José Antonio Nieves Conde; José María Forqué
- Written by: Lluís Josep Comerón; Jorge Illa; Manuel Tamayo; José Antonio de la Loma
- Starring: Jorge Mistral; Nani Fernández
- Cinematography: José F. Aguayo; Francisco Sempere
- Edited by: Petra de Nieva
- Music by: Isidro B. Maiztegui
- Production company: Yago Films
- Release date: 7 May 1956
- Running time: 85 minutes
- Country: Spain
- Language: Spanish

The Legion of Silence (Spanish:La legión del silencio) is a 1956 Spanish drama film directed by José María Forqué and José Antonio Nieves Conde and starring Jorge Mistral and Nani Fernández.

The film's sets were designed by Sigfrido Burmann.

== Cast ==
- Jorge Mistral as Jean Balzac / Paul Banek
- Nani Fernández as Dana
- Joan Capri
- Fernando Cebrián
- Félix Dafauce as Grumko
- José Marco Davó as Kavenko
- María Dolores Gispert as Ludmilla
- Diana Mayer
- César Ojinaga as Lucas
- Esther Parera as Maruska
- Nicolás D. Perchicot as Padre Orbinski
- Rubén Rojo as Chapeck
- Juan Manuel Soriano as Yenka
- Jesús Tordesillas as Josef
- Tomás Torres

== Bibliography ==
- D'Lugo, Marvin. Guide to the Cinema of Spain. Greenwood Publishing, 1997.
