= Tempest (1949 film) =

1949 film

- Directed by: Juan de Orduña
- Written by: Antonio Mas Guindal
- Starring: Juanita Reina; Virgilio Teixeira; Miriam Di San Servolo
- Cinematography: José F. Aguayo
- Music by: Jesús García Leoz
- Production companies: Juan de Orduña, P.C.
- Distributed by: Columbia Films
- Release date: 29 October 1949
- Running time: 95 minutes
- Country: Spain
- Language: Spanish

Tempest (Spanish: Vendaval) is a 1949 Spanish historical drama film directed by Juan de Orduña and starring Juanita Reina, Virgilio Teixeira and Miriam Di San Servolo. It was shot at the CEA Studios in Madrid.

== Cast ==
- Juanita Reina as Soledad Montero
- Virgilio Teixeira as Capitán Mir
- Miriam Di San Servolo as Isabel II
- Lina Yegros as Condesa de Medina
- Jesús Tordesillas as Don Juan Fernández
- Eduardo Fajardo as Coronel Puig Moltó
- José Bódalo as Pedro Montero
- Rafael Bardem
- Francisco Pierrá

== Bibliography ==
- Bosworth, R.J.B. Claretta: Mussolini's Last Lover. Yale University Press, 2017.
- De España, Rafael. Directory of Spanish and Portuguese film-makers and films. Greenwood Press, 1994.
