= Lovely Memory =

- Directed by: Antonio del Amo
- Written by: Jaime García-Herranz
- Produced by: Luis Berraquero
- Starring: Joselito; Libertad Lamarque; Sara García
- Cinematography: Alfredo Fraile
- Edited by: Petra de Nieva
- Music by: Manuel Parada
- Production companies: Suevia Films; Cesáreo González Producciones Cinematográficas; Cinematográfica Filmex; Producciones Gonzalo
- Release date: 16 October 1961
- Running time: 104 minutes
- Countries: Mexico; Spain
- Language: Spanish

Lovely Memory (Spanish: Bello recuerdo) is a 1961 Mexican-Spanish musical drama film directed by Antonio del Amo and starring Joselito, Libertad Lamarque and Sara García.

The film's sets were designed by Sigfrido Burmann.

== Cast ==
- Joselito as Joselito
- Libertad Lamarque as Lucy
- Sara García as Dona Sara
- Roberto Camardiel as Ramon
- Salvador Soler Marí
- Antonio Gandía
- Félix Fernández
- Manuel de Juan
- Aníbal Vela
- Pilar Gómez Ferrer
- Pedrín Fernández
- Juan Cortés
- Tito García
- Maleni Castro
- Santiago Pardo

== Bibliography ==
- Bentley, Bernard. A Companion to Spanish Cinema. Boydell & Brewer 2008.
- de España, Rafael. Directory of Spanish and Portuguese film-makers and films. Greenwood Press, 1994.
- Manuel Palacio & Jörg Türschmann. Transnational Cinema in Europe. LIT Verlag Münster, 2013.
