= Neutrality (film) =

- Directed by: Eusebio Fernández Ardavín
- Written by: César Fernández Ardavín; Eusebio Fernández Ardavín
- Starring: Adriana Benetti; Jorge Mistral; Manuel Luna
- Cinematography: Manuel Berenguer
- Music by: Emilio Lehmberg
- Production company: Valencia Films
- Distributed by: CIFESA
- Release date: 30 December 1949
- Running time: 110 minutes
- Country: Spain
- Language: Spanish

Neutrality (Spanish:Neutralidad) is a 1949 drama film directed by Eusebio Fernández Ardavín and starring Adriana Benetti, Jorge Mistral and Manuel Luna. During the Second World War a German refugee is able to escape to America with the help of a neutral Spanish ship.

== Partial cast ==
- Adriana Benetti as Monika
- Jorge Mistral as Ignaz, 1. Schiffsoffizier
- Manuel Monroy as Ferdinand, 2. Offizier
- Gérard Tichy as Deutscher Offizier
- A.N. Gosling as Amerikanischer Offizier
- Jesús Tordesillas as Spanischer Kapitän
- Manuel Luna as Blinder Passagier
- José Prada as Senor Andes
- Valeriano Andrés
- Mario Berriatúa

== Bibliography ==
- Antonio Petrucci. Twenty Years of Cinema in Venice. International Exhibition of Cinematographic Art, 1952.
