= Tomy's Secret =

- Directed by: Antonio del Amo
- Written by: J. Mallorquí (novel); Víctor Ruiz Iriarte
- Produced by: Cesáreo González; René Pignières
- Starring: Fabienne Dali; Joselito; Fernando Casanova
- Cinematography: José F. Aguayo
- Music by: Manuel Parada
- Production companies: Suevia Films; Société Nouvelle de Cinématographie
- Distributed by: Suevia Films
- Release date: 18 December 1963
- Running time: 88 minutes
- Countries: France; Spain
- Language: Spanish

Tomy's Secret (Spanish: El secreto de Tomy) is a 1963 French-Spanish musical film directed by Antonio del Amo and starring Fabienne Dali, Joselito and Fernando Casanova.

The film's sets were designed by Sigfrido Burmann.

== Cast ==
- Fabienne Dali as Sylvia
- Joselito as Tomy
- Fernando Casanova
- Milagros Leal
- Carmen Bernardos
- Concha Goyanes
- Marie France
- Rafael Alonso
- Trini Alonso
- Roland Armontel as Fabien Margoz
- Ángel de Andrés
- Paul Ellis
- Maribel Hidalgo
- Goyo Lebrero
- Alfredo Mayo
- Venancio Muro
- Salvador Soler Marí
- Adolfo Torrado
- Antonio Vela as Campeón
- María Esther Vázquez

== Bibliography ==
- de España, Rafael. Directory of Spanish and Portuguese film-makers and films. Greenwood Press, 1994.
