= Malvaloca (1942 film) =

- Directed by: Luis Marquina
- Written by: Joaquín Álvarez Quintero (play); Serafín Álvarez Quintero (play); Luis Marquina
- Starring: Amparo Rivelles; Alfredo Mayo; Manuel Luna; Rosita Yarza
- Cinematography: Willy Goldberger
- Edited by: Juan Pallejá
- Music by: José Ruiz de Azagra
- Production company: CIFESA
- Distributed by: CIFESA
- Release date: 18 September 1942
- Running time: 96 minutes
- Country: Spain
- Language: Spanish

Malvaloca is a 1942 Spanish drama film directed by Luis Marquina and starring Amparo Rivelles, Alfredo Mayo and Manuel Luna. It is an adaptation of the 1912 play of the same title about a fallen woman from Málaga who eventually redeems herself. Following the film's success Rivelles was signed up for a lucrative three-year contract by CIFESA, the biggest studio in Spain.

== Synopsis ==
A beautiful and nice young woman from Malaga, whom everyone calls Malvaloca, is forced to have lovers to bring money to her house, when she falls in love with Leonardo, a friend and partner of her last lover. The drama is unleashed because although he also loves her, they must fight against the social rejection that this courtship provokes. Apart from the dramatic action, the work shows the grace and spontaneity of the dialogues typical of the works of the Quinteros brothers.

== Cast ==
- Amparo Rivelles as Malvaloca
- Alfredo Mayo as Leonardo
- Manuel Luna as Salvador
- Rosita Yarza as Juanela
- Fernando Freyre de Andrade as Jeromo
- Miguel Pozanco as Barrabás
- Rafaela Satorrés as Hermana Piedad
- Pablo Hidalgo as Nogales
- María López Morante as Teresona
- Mercedes Borrull as Alfonsa
- José Prada as Padre de Malvaloca
- Matilde Artero as Doña Enriqueta
- Camino Garrigó as Mariquita
- Nicolás D. Perchicot as Martín
- Angelita Navalón
- Gracia de Triana

== Bibliography ==
- Labanyi, Jo & Pavlović, Tatjana. A Companion to Spanish Cinema. John Wiley & Sons, 2012.
- Peiró, Eva Woods. White Gypsies: Race and Stardom in Spanish Musical Films. University of Minnesota Press, 2012.
