= María Asquerino =

Spanish actress

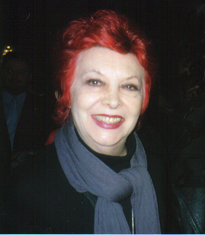
- Born: Dulce Nombre de María Serrano Muro; 25 November 1925; Madrid, Spain
- Died: 27 February 2013 (aged 87); Madrid, Spain
- Occupation: Actress
- Years active: 1941-2009

Dulce Nombre de María Serrano Muro (25 November 1925 – 27 February 2013), better known as María Asquerino, was a Spanish film actress.

== Biography ==
Dulce Nombre de María Serrano Muro was born in Madrid on 25 November 1925. Her mother (actress Eloísa Muro) did not want Dulce Nombre de María to feature her father's surname, even if Muro never hid the fact that actor Mariano Asquerino was the father.

== Filmography ==
Year	Title	Role	Notes
1941	Porque te vi llorar	Merche	
1944	El ilustre Perea		
1944	Y tú, ¿quién eres?		
1944	Aventura	Flora	
1944	El hombre que las enamora	Diana	
1946	The Emigrant	Marichu	
1947	The Holy Queen	Leonora	
1947	La sirena negra		
1947	Don Quixote	Luscinda	
1948	Conflicto inesperado	Marìa	
1948	Extraño amanecer		
1949	Don Juan de Serrallonga	Juana de Torrellas	
1949	¡Olé torero!		
1949	El sótano	Eva	
1950	Pequeñeces...	Leopoldina Pastor	
1950	Agustina of Aragon	Carmen	
1950	Don Juan	Claudina	
1950	Apollo Theatre	Elena Ramos	
1950	La noche del sábado	Condesa	
1951	El Negro que tenía el alma blanca	Luisa Olmos	
1951	The Seventh Page	Leonor	
1951	Furrows	Pili	
1952	Facultad de letras	Mimí	
1952	Hombre acosado	Viviana	
1953	Hermano menor		
1953	Airport		
1954	Manicomio	Eugenia	
1954	Dos caminos	Marcelle	
1954	Two Paths	María	
1955	The Other Life of Captain Contreras	Paca Revilla	
1955	Cancha vasca	Begoña	
1955	The Bachelor	Catina	
1956	Afternoon of the Bulls	Paloma	
1956	La vida en un bloc	Calixta / Lupe Tovar	
1958	Night and Dawn		
1962	The Robbers	Asunción	
1962	El último verano	Monique	
1962	The Balcony of the Moon	Amparo Rovira	
1963	Operación Embajada	Sofía Valcárcel	
1963	El sol en el espejo	Loli	
1963	El juego de la verdad	María	
1964	A tiro limpio	Marisa	
1964	Donde tú estés	Colette Aurillac	
1965	¡¡Arriba las mujeres!!	Doña Gloria	
1966	Amador	Ana	
1967	De cuerpo presente	Mujer de Henry	
1969	Pepa Doncel		
1970	Las gatas tienen frío	Menchu	
1970	The Complete Idiot	Engracia	
1971	Goya, a Story of Solitude	Leocadia	
1971	Las melancólicas	Presidenta Junta manicomio	
1972	Las colocadas	Elena	
1973	Venta por pisos	Emilia	
1973	Nadie oyó gritar	Nuria	
1973	Separación matrimonial	María Eugenia	
1977	Pecado mortal	Alcira	
1977	That Obscure Object of Desire	Encarnación - madre de Conchita	
1977	La Raulito en libertad	Celadora	
1977	Marián	Ana	
1978	Der Tiefstapler	Erica Baer	
1978	Enigma rosso	Miss Graham	
1980	Amigo	Doña Clemencia	
1980	Tierra de rastrojos		
1980	La campanada	Señora del bar	
1980	El gran secreto	Dolores	
1986	Mambrú se fue a la guerra	Florentina	
1989	The Sea and the Weather	Marcela	Goya Award for Best Supporting Actress
1990	Yo soy ésa	Jugadora	
1991	Fuera de juego	Sor María	
1993	Tres palabras	Gloria	
1995	Nobody Will Speak of Us When We're Dead	Esperanza	
1996	A tiro limpio	Clienta	
1996	Fotos	Madre Azucena	
1998	¡Eureka!	Madre	
1999	Muertos de risa	Madre Radical	
2000	La comunidad	Encarna	
2003	Hotel Danubio	Tía Ángela	
2004	Tiovivo c. 1950	Doña Justa	
2009	Pagafantas	Señora Begoña	(final film role)

== Awards ==
Year	Title	Category	Movie	Outcome	Ref.
1989	Goya Award	Best Supporting Actress	The Sea And Time	Winner	
1970	Medals Film Writers Circle	Best Supporting Actress	Goya, the story of a lonelinessThe fool of the boat	Winner	
2008	Actors Union	Lifetime	-	Winner	
