= Listen to My Song =

- Directed by: Antonio del Amo
- Written by: Emilio Canda; José Manuel Iglesias; Antonio del Amo
- Produced by: Cesáreo González
- Starring: Joselito; Luz Márquez; Jesús Tordesillas
- Cinematography: Juan Mariné
- Edited by: Petra de Nieva
- Music by: Augusto Algueró; Cesare A. Bixio; Freire; Genaro Monreal; Antonio Segovia
- Production companies: Cesáreo González Producciones Cinematográficas; Suevia Films
- Distributed by: Suevia Films
- Release date: 2 November 1959
- Running time: 84 minutes
- Country: Spain
- Language: Spanish

Listen to My Song (Spanish: Escucha mi canción) is a 1959 Spanish musical film directed by Antonio del Amo, and starring Joselito, Luz Márquez and Jesús Tordesillas.

The film's sets were designed by Sigfrido Burmann.

== Synopsis ==
A poor boy with a great voice get on a television show. His real mother watches him and deeply knows that he is her son; then, there is a happy ending.

== Cast ==
- Joselito as himself
- Luz Márquez as Marta, madre de Joselito
- Jesús Tordesillas as Marqués de Alvar, abuelo de Joselito
- Barta Barri as Isabel
- Pilar Sanclemente as Lucinda
- Carlos Miguel Solá
- Salvador Soler Marí
- Dolores Villaespesa
- Ismael Elma
- Antonio Fernández
- Amalia Sánchez Ariño
- Mariano Alcón
- Domingo Rivas
- Pedro Rodríguez de Quevedo
- Gastón
- Kuki
- Ana Sliska
- Felixin Yuste
- Amparo Amador
- Juan Romero (actor)
- Laurette Marlu
- Luis Solares
- Carmen Pérez Gallo
- Jesus Alvarez
- Mariano Medina
- Mario Berriatúa

== Bibliography ==
- de España, Rafael. Directory of Spanish and Portuguese film-makers and films. Greenwood Press, 1994.
