= White Mission =

1946 film

- Spanish: Misión blanca
- Directed by: Juan de Orduña
- Written by: Pío Ballesteros; Jaime García-Herranz; Antonio Mas Guindal; Jesús Rubiera; Ángel Torres del Álamo; Juan de Orduña
- Produced by: Jesús Rubiera
- Starring: Manuel Luna; Jorge Mistral; Fernando Rey; Elva de Bethancourt
- Cinematography: Michel Kelber
- Edited by: Mariano Pombo
- Music by: Juan Quintero
- Production company: Colonial AJE
- Distributed by: Colonial AJE
- Release date: 1946
- Running time: 88 minutes
- Country: Spain
- Language: Spanish

White Mission (Spanish: Misión blanca) is a 1946 Spanish drama film directed by Juan de Orduña and starring Manuel Luna, Jorge Mistral and Fernando Rey. The film was shot on location in Spanish Guinea and in a Spanish studio. The film's sets were designed by Sigfrido Burmann and Francisco Canet.

The film portrays a religious mission in the Spanish Empire.

== Cast ==
- Ricardo Acero as Father Mauricio
- Gabriel Algara as Jiménez
- Marianela Barandalla as Diana
- Elva de Bethancourt as Souka
- Juan Espantaleón as Cesáreo Urgoiti
- Manuel Luna as Brisco
- Arturo Marín as Father Daniel
- Jorge Mistral as Minoa
- Nicolás Perchicot as Father Suárez
- Julio Peña as Father Javier
- Fernando Rey as Carlos
- José Miguel Rupert as Souka's father
- Jesús Tordesillas as Father Urcola
