= Tormented Soul =

1950 film

- Directed by: Juan de Orduña
- Written by: Luis García Ortega; Natividad Zaro
- Starring: Miriam Di San Servolo; José Bódalo; Eduardo Fajardo
- Cinematography: José F. Aguayo
- Music by: Juan Quintero
- Production company: Boga Films
- Release date: 31 May 1950
- Running time: 95 minutes
- Country: Spain
- Language: Spanish

Tormented Soul (Spanish: Tempestad en el alma) is a 1950 Spanish drama film directed by Juan de Orduña and starring Miriam Di San Servolo, José Bódalo and Eduardo Fajardo. It was one of several films made in Francoist Spain by Di San Servolo, the sister of former Italian dictator Benito Mussolini's mistress Clara Petacci.

== Cast ==
- Miriam Di San Servolo
- José Bódalo
- Eduardo Fajardo
- Manuel Arbó
- Tomás Blanco
- Luis García Ortega
- Julia Pachelo
- Pilar Soler

== Bibliography ==
- Bosworth, R.J.B. Claretta: Mussolini's Last Lover. Yale University Press, 2017.
- De España, Rafael. Directory of Spanish and Portuguese film-makers and films. Greenwood Press, 1994.
