= Nati Mistral =

Spanish actress and singer

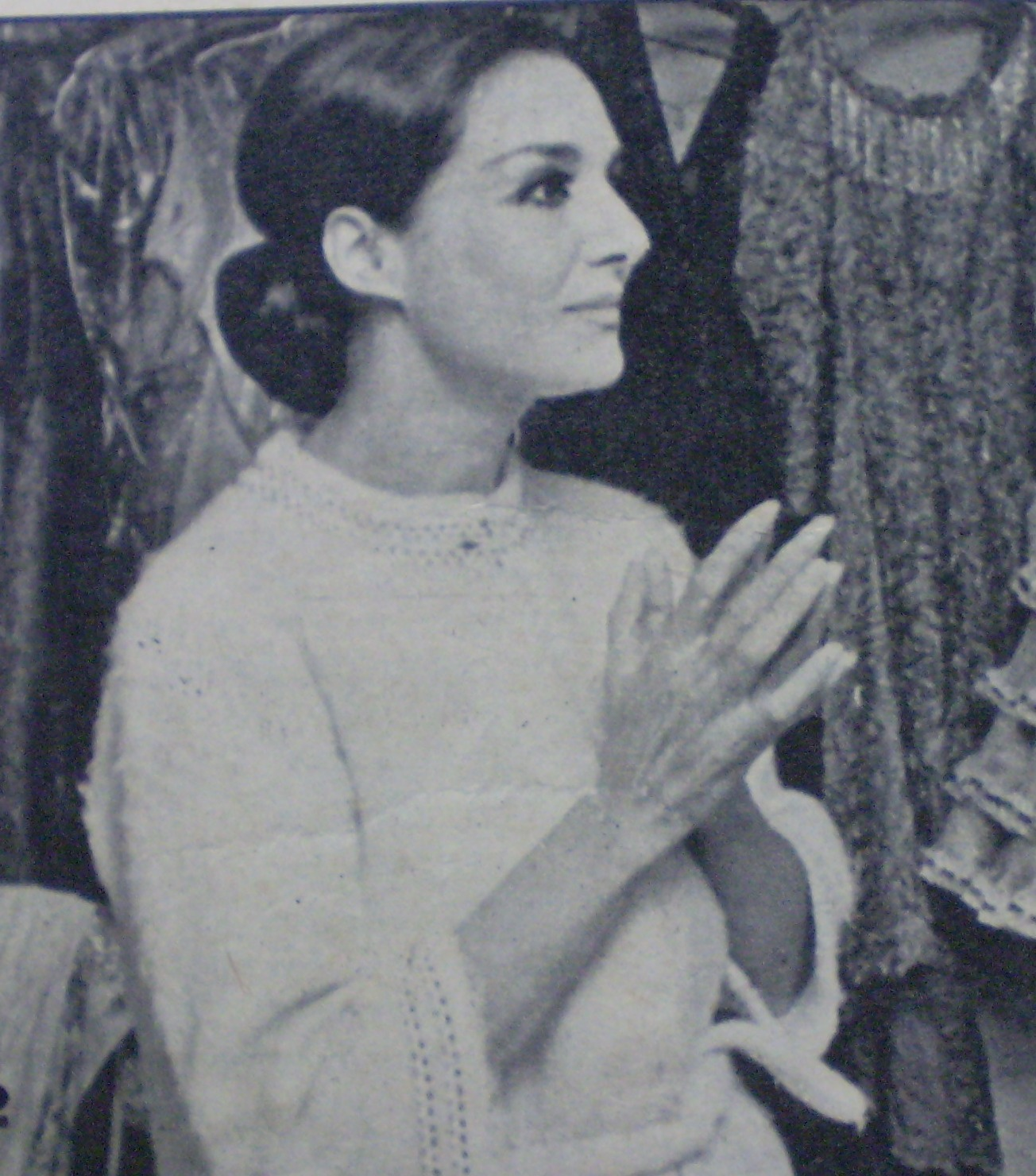
- Mistral in 1976
- Born: Natividad Macho Álvarez; 13 December 1928; Madrid, Spain
- Died: 20 August 2017 (aged 88); Madrid, Spain
- Occupations: Actress, singer

Natividad Macho Álvarez (13 December 1928 – 20 August 2017), known by the stage name Nati Mistral, was a Spanish actress and singer, closely linked to Argentina and Mexico. She won the National Theater Prize in 1997.

== Career ==
She began her recording career in 1944, and from then on, she performed and recorded Andalusian *coplas*, *pasodobles*, *boleros*, *cuplés*, *zarzuelas*, *rancheras*, and *valses criollos*. She starred in the films *María Fernanda, la Jerezana* (1947), *Oro y marfil* (1947), *Currito de la Cruz* (1949), and *Cabaret* (1953). On stage, she distinguished herself through her precise diction and clear pronunciation, which led her to give poetry recitals featuring works by classical authors.

She is considered a pioneer of major musicals in Spain. Mistral and Luis Escobar achieved success with the musicals *La Perrichola* (1963) and *La bella de Texas* (1965), a fantasy based on the zarzuela *La corte de faraón* by Perrín, Palacios, and Lleó. She starred in the first Madrid production of *Man of La Mancha* (*El hombre de La Mancha*), directed by José Osuna, in 1966.

She died on August 20, 2017, in Madrid at the age of 88, and was cremated the following day in El Escorial.

== Selected filmography ==
- The Captain's Ship (1947)
- Gold and Ivory (1947)
- Currito of the Cross (1949)
- Service at Sea (1951)
- Cabaret (1953)
- Lovers of Toledo (1953)
- My Street (1960)
- Mis tres amores (1971)

== Stage roles ==
- Te espero en el Eslava (1957–1958)
- Ven y ven...al Eslava (1958–1959)
- El amor brujo (1966)
- Man of La Mancha (1966; 1969–1970)
- Anillos para una dama (1976)
- Azabache (1992)
- Afectos compartidos (2005)

== Recording career ==
She recorded several EPs and albums, from 1957 into the 1980s. She sang on recordings issued by the Montilla, Vergara of (Vergara_(Editorial), Decca, Columbia, Belter, and Orfeón record labels.
