= The Balcony of the Moon =

1962 film

- Directed by: Luis Saslavsky
- Written by: Jorge Feliu; José María Font; Antonio de Lara; Luis Saslavsky
- Produced by: Cesáreo González
- Starring: Carmen Sevilla; Lola Flores; Paquita Rico
- Cinematography: Alejandro Ulloa
- Edited by: Sara Ontañón
- Production company: Suevia Films
- Distributed by: Suevia Films
- Release date: 1 October 1962
- Running time: 99 minutes
- Country: Spain
- Language: Spanish

The Balcony of the Moon (Spanish:El balcón de la Luna) is a 1962 Spanish musical comedy film directed by Luis Saslavsky and starring Carmen Sevilla, Lola Flores and Paquita Rico. Its critical and commercial failure illustrated the declining popularity of the Andalusian musical, one of the most popular Spanish genres of the 1950s.

The film's sets were designed by Sigfrido Burmann.

== Cast ==
- Carmen Sevilla as Charo
- Lola Flores as Cora
- Paquita Rico as Pili
- Leo Anchóriz
- Paloma Valdés
- María Asquerino as Amparo
- Manuel Monroy
- Manuel Zarzo
- Virgílio Teixeira
- Guillermo Marín as Indalecio de Quirós
- Vicente Ros
- José Prada
- Yelena Samarina
- Josefina Serratosa
- Juan Cortés
- Adrián Ortega
- Manuel de Juan
- Nicolás D. Perchicot
- Julia Pachelo
- Manuel Peiró
- José María Tasso
- Ángel Álvarez
- Guillermo Méndez
- Paco Perea
- Isabel Perales
- Julia Osete
- Jerónimo Montoro
- Luis Rivera
- Miguel Merino
- Joaquín Burgos
- Juana Cáceres
- Fernando Sánchez Polack
- Carmen Pastor
- José Villasante
- Paloma Amaya

== Bibliography ==
- Mira, Alberto. The A to Z of Spanish Cinema. Rowman & Littlefield, 2010.
