= The Blackmailers =

- Directed by: Rafael Gil
- Written by: José López Rubio; José Vicente Puente
- Produced by: Marciano de la Fuente; Cesáreo González
- Starring: Manuel Benítez 'El Cordobés'; Alberto de Mendoza; Manolo Morán
- Cinematography: José F. Aguayo
- Edited by: Antonio Ramírez de Loaysa
- Music by: Gregorio García Segura
- Production company: Cesáreo González Producciones Cinematográficas
- Distributed by: Suevia Films
- Release date: 14 June 1963
- Running time: 105 minutes
- Country: Spain
- Language: Spanish

The Blackmailers or Blackmailing a Bullfighter (Spanish:Chantaje a un torero) is a 1963 Spanish crime film directed by Rafael Gil and starring Manuel Benítez 'El Cordobés', Alberto de Mendoza and Manolo Morán.

== Cast ==
- Manuel Benítez 'El Cordobés' as Juan Medina
- Alberto de Mendoza as Vergara 'El Americano'
- Manolo Morán as Don Fulgencio, apoderado de Juan
- María Andersen as Wilma, turista alemana
- Elena Duque as Marta, novia de Juan
- Luis Dávila as Don Andrés, el sacerdote
- Venancio Muro as El Tinta
- Carlos Mendy
- José Mata
- José María Seoane
- Manuel Alexandre
- Luis Induni
- Antonio Casas
- José María Caffarel
- Juan Cortés
- Hugo Pimentel
- Yelena Samarina as Belly, turista inglesa
- José Morales
- Mercedes Borqué
- Fernando Liger

== Bibliography ==
- de España, Rafael. Directory of Spanish and Portuguese film-makers and films. Greenwood Press, 1994.
