= Manuel Luna (actor) =

Spanish actor

- Born: 27 April 1898; Seville; Spain
- Died: 9 June 1958 (aged 60); Madrid; Spain
- Occupation: Film actor
- Years active: 1923–1958

Manuel Luna (27 April 1898 – 9 June 1958) was a Spanish film actor.

== Selected filmography ==
- Nobleza baturra (1935) - Marco
- Carmen, la de Triana (1938) - Antonio Vargas Heredia
- The Song of Aixa (1939)
- Whirlwind (1941) - Segundo Izquierdo
- Follow the Legion (1942)
- Malvaloca (1942)
- We Thieves Are Honourable (1942)
- The Scandal (1943)
- A Shadow at the Window (1944)
- White Mission (1946)
- A New Play (1946)
- The Captain's Ship (1947)
- Lola Leaves for the Ports (1947)
- Madness for Love (1948)
- Neutrality (1949)
- The Captain from Loyola (1949)
- Currito of the Cross (1949)
- The Duchess of Benameji (1949)
- Agustina of Aragon (1950)
- Woman to Woman (1950)
- Dawn of America (1951)
- The Lioness of Castille (1951)
- Sister San Sulpicio (1952)
- Lola the Coalgirl (1952)
- Gloria Mairena (1952)
- Daughter of the Sea (1953)
- The Mayor of Zalamea (1954)
- An Andalusian Gentleman (1954)
