= Peaches in Syrup =

- Spanish: Melocotón en almíbar
- Directed by: Antonio del Amo
- Written by: Miguel Mihura (play); Carlos Sampelayo; Antonio del Amo
- Starring: Barta Barri; José Guardiola
- Cinematography: Juan Mariné
- Music by: Augusto Algueró
- Production company: Apolo Films
- Release date: 1960
- Running time: 88 minutes
- Country: Spain
- Language: Spanish

Peaches in Syrup (Spanish: Melocotón en almíbar) is a 1960 Spanish film directed by Antonio del Amo. It is an adaptation of the play of the same name by Miguel Mihura.

== Cast ==
In alphabetical order

- Barta Barri as Duke
- Antonio Gandía as baby
- José Guardiola as Duke
- Manuel Insúa as baby
- Carlos Larrañaga as Carlos
- Marga López as Sister María
- María Mahor as Nuria
- Matilde Muñoz Sampedro as Doña Pilar
- Pilar Gómez Ferrer as fruit vendor

== Production and release ==
Filming started on April 18, 1960 with Juan Mariné as director of photography; Mariné interrupted and abandoned his work with Jésus Franco to join the crew.

The film encountered problems with censorship that were addressed by various amendments to the plot (including the character of a nun who was judged exceedingly silly) and it was released on November, 14 1960.

== See also ==
- You Don't Shoot at Angels (1960)
