= Boy or Girl? =

1962 film

- Directed by: Antonio del Amo
- Written by: Antonio Guzmán Merino; Antonio del Amo
- Starring: Maleni Castro; Maleni de Castro
- Cinematography: Juan Mariné
- Edited by: Petra de Nieva
- Music by: Manuel Gordillo
- Production companies: Apolo Films; Oro Films
- Distributed by: Chamartín
- Release date: 10 December 1962
- Running time: 91 minutes
- Countries: Mexico; Spain
- Language: Spanish

Boy or Girl? (Spanish: ¿Chico o chica?) is a 1962 Mexican-Spanish musical comedy film directed by Antonio del Amo.

== Synopsis ==
A young Spanish mother is forced to emigrate to Mexico for economic reasons. Unable to take her young daughter with her, she leaves the girl in the care of her paternal aunt and uncle in Spain. Years later, after improving her circumstances in the Americas, she returns to Spain determined to reclaim her daughter, who has since become a teenager and a talented singer with a charming voice. However, the girl's aunt and uncle have grown deeply attached to her and refuse to give her up easily, devising numerous schemes to prevent the mother from taking her away.

== Cast ==
- Maleni Castro
- Maleni de Castro
- Manuel de Juan
- Eulália del Pino
- Miguel Gómez
- Fernando Liger
- Maleni
- Gracita Morales
- Luis Moreno
- Erasmo Pascual
- Cesáreo Quezadas 'Pulgarcito'
- Manuel Rojas

== Bibliography ==
- de España, Rafael. Directory of Spanish and Portuguese film-makers and films. Greenwood Press, 1994.
