= Valeriano Andrés =

Spanish actor

- Born: 1 June 1922; Madrid, Spain
- Died: 21 April 2005 (aged 82); Madrid, Spain
- Other name: Valeriano Andrés Pascual
- Occupation: Actor
- Years active: 1946-2002

Valeriano Andrés (1922–2005) was a Spanish film and television actor.

== Selected filmography ==
- I Will Consult Mister Brown (1946)
- Guest of Darkness (1948)
- Night Arrival (1949)
- Neutrality (1949)
- The Duchess of Benameji (1949)
- Agustina of Aragon (1950)
- The Great Galeoto (1951)
- Devil's Roundup (1952)
- Gloria Mairena (1952)
- Lola the Coalgirl (1952)
- Airport (1953)
- Outstanding (1953)
- The Seducer of Granada (1953)
- Jeromin (1953)
- An Andalusian Gentleman (1954)
- Two Paths (1954)
- The Daughters of Helena (1963)

== Bibliography ==
- Florentino Soria. José María Forqué. Editora Regional de Murcia, 1990.
