= Jesús Tordesillas =

Spanish actor (1893–1973)

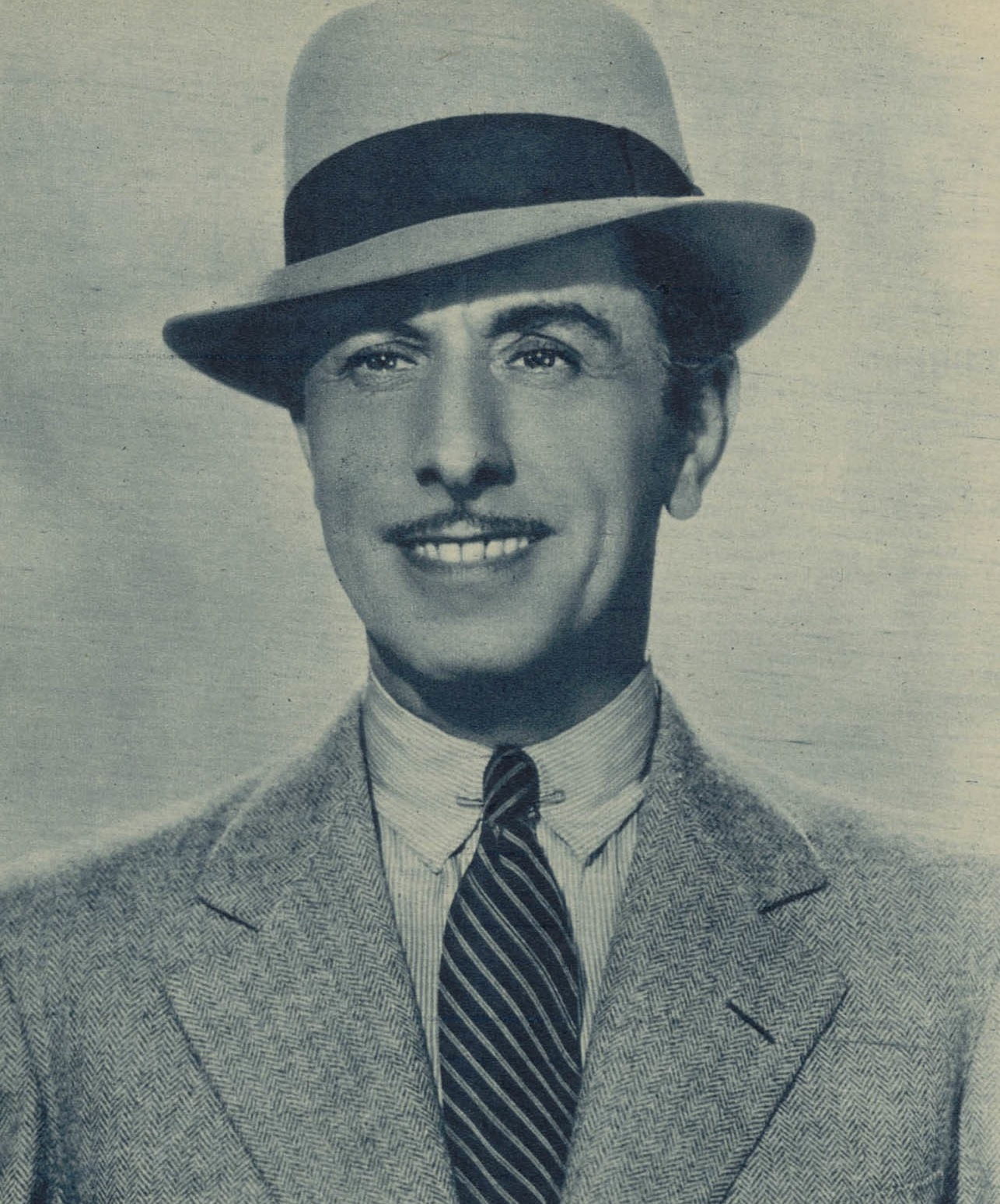
- Born: Jesús Tordesillas Fernández; 28 January 1893; Madrid, Spain
- Died: 24 March 1973 (aged 80); Madrid, Spain
- Occupation: Actor
- Years active: 1921–1973

Jesús Tordesillas Fernández (28 January 1893 – 24 March 1973) was a Spanish film actor. He appeared in 94 films between 1921 and 1973. He starred in the film Reckless which was entered into the 1951 Cannes Film Festival.

== Selected filmography ==
- Flor de España o La historia de un torero (1925)
- Currito of the Cross (1926) – Currito de la Cruz
- Madrid se divorcia (1935)
- The Strange Marchioness (1939)
- Marianela (1940) – Pablo's Father
- The Unloved Woman (1940) – Esteban
- The Queen's Flower Girl (1940)
- Pepe Conde (1941) – Don Gaspar
- Idilio en Mallorca (1943)
- Fever (1943) – L'avvocato
- Dora la espía (1943)
- The Nail (1944) – Presidente del Consejo
- Eugenia de Montijo (1944) – Próspero Mérimée
- Lola Montes (1944) – Luis I de Baviera
- A Shadow at the Window (1945) – Pedro Alar
- Espronceda (1945) – Miguel de los Santos
- Viento de siglos (1945)
- Su última noche (1945) – Narrador
- White Mission (1946) – Padre Urcola
- Leyenda de feria (1946)
- La mantilla de Beatriz (1946) – Calderón de la Barca
- El crimen de Pepe Conde (1946) – Marqués
- A New Play (1946) – Shakespeare
- Las inquietudes de Shanti Andía (1947) – Patricio Allen
- Serenata española (1947) – Robert Brighton
- The Captain's Ship (1947) – Don Antonio
- Lola Leaves for the Ports (1947) – Don Diego
- Leyenda de Navidad (1947) – William Scrooge
- Madness for Love (1948) – Don Filiberto de Vere
- Jalisco Sings in Seville (1949) – Don Manuel Vargas
- Neutrality (1949) – Spanischer Kapitän
- El sótano (1949) – Padre Ramón
- Tempest (1949) – Don Juan Fernández
- Pequeñeces... (1950) – Padre Cifuentes
- Woman to Woman (1950) – Antonio – Isabel's father
- Agustina of Aragon (1950) – Coronel Torres
- Reckless (1951) – Don Carlos Mendoza
- The Lioness of Castille (1951) – Don López
- The Seventh Page (1951) – Arrosti
- Dawn of America (1951) – Fray Juan Pérez
- Doña Francisquita (1952) – Don Matías
- Jeromin (1953) – Carlos V
- El indiano (1955) – Duque
- La lupa (1955) – Padre Miguel
- El piyayo (1956) – D. Carlos
- Afternoon of the Bulls (1956) – Luis Montes
- The Legion of Silence (1956) – Josef
- Dimentica il mio passato (1957)
- Spanish Affair (1957) – Sotelo
- La guerra empieza en Cuba (1957) – Marqués
- El andén (1957) – Don Javier
- The Warrior and the Slave Girl (1958) – Crisippo
- Where Are You Going, Alfonso XII? (1959) – Ceferino
- Venta de Vargas (1959) – French General
- Una Gran señora (1959) – Richard Chrysler
- S.O.S., abuelita (1959)
- Listen To My Song (1959) – Marqués de Alvar, abuelo de Joselito
- The Little Colonel (1960) – Don Esteban
- Un ángel tuvo la culpa (1960) – Falso Conde de Campoy
- Margarita se llama mi amor (1961)
- El pobre García (1961)
- Ella y los veteranos (1961) – Joaquín Aguirre
- Fray Escoba (1961) – Padre Prior
- Kill and Be Killed (1962) – Farmacéutico
- Teresa de Jesús (1962)
- Zorro the Avenger (1962) – Raimundo
- Mentirosa (1962)
- Shades of Zorro (1962) – Raimundo
- Magic Fountain (1963) – José Serrano
- Plaza de oriente (1963)
- Cristo negro (1963) – Padre Braulio
- The Sign of the Coyote (1963) – Don Cesar's Father
- Juicio contra un ángel (1964)
- Black Angel of the Mississippi (1964) – David Edwards
- Tintin and the Blue Oranges (1964) – Don Lope (uncredited)
- El señor de La Salle (1964) – Juez
- Per un pugno nell'occhio (1965) – Enterrador
- A Coffin for the Sheriff (1965) – Slim, the Old Man
- El proscrito del río Colorado (1965) – Cristobal Riaño
- Spies Strike Silently (1966) – Prof. Roland Bergson
- Acompáñame (1966) – Pantaleón
- Dos hombres van a morir (1968) – Mormon Leader (uncredited)
- A Stranger in Paso Bravo (1968)
- Hard Contract (1969) – Minor Role (uncredited)
- Los escondites (1969)
- El relicario (1970)
- ¿Es usted mi padre? (1971)
- The Horsemen (1971) – Little Governor (uncredited)
- In nome del padre, del figlio e della Colt (1971) – (uncredited)
- Delusions of Grandeur (1971) – (uncredited)
- The Guerrilla (1973) – Don Alonso
- La llamaban La Madrina (1973)
- Con la música a otra parte (1974) – Mr. Jazz
