= José María Seoane =

Spanish film actor

- Born: 13 September 1913; Vigo, Spain
- Died: 7 July 1989 (aged 75); Madrid, Spain
- Occupation: Actor
- Years active: 1941-1973 (film)

José María Seoane (13 September 1913 – 7 July 1989) was a Spanish film actor.

== Selected filmography ==
- Autumn Roses (1943)
- Cinnamon Flower (1943)
- Life Begins at Midnight (1944)
- Mariona Rebull (1947)
- The Party Goes On (1948)
- Saturday Night (1950)
- Last Day (1952)
- Two Degrees of Ecuador (1953)
- The Fan (1958)
- The Reprieve (1961)
- Queen of The Chantecler (1962)
- The Blackmailers (1963)
- Assassination in Rome (1965)
- Pedrito de Andía's New Life (1965)
- The Lost Woman (1966)
- The Doubt (1972)
- Nothing Less Than a Real Man (1972)
- The Guerrilla (1973)

== Bibliography ==
- Goble, Alan. The Complete Index to Literary Sources in Film. Walter de Gruyter, 1999.
