= Return to the Truth =

1956 film

- Directed by: Antonio del Amo
- Written by: Jorge Griñán; Antonio Guzmán Merino; Antonio del Amo
- Starring: Susana Canales; Julio Peña; Germán Cobos
- Cinematography: César Fraile
- Edited by: Petra de Nieva
- Music by: Jesús García Leoz; Mario Medina
- Production companies: Hispamex Films; Técnicos Asociados
- Distributed by: Hispamex Films
- Release date: 30 April 1956
- Running time: 80 minutes
- Country: Spain
- Language: Spanish

Return to the Truth (Spanish: Retorno a la verdad) is a 1956 Spanish drama film directed by Antonio del Amo and starring Susana Canales, Julio Peña and Germán Cobos.

== Cast ==
- Susana Canales
- Julio Peña
- Germán Cobos
- Ángel Ter
- Dolores Quesada
- María Luisa Moneró
- Rafael Calvo Revilla
- María Sánchez Aroca
- Rodolfo del Campo
- Amalia Sánchez Ariño
- Marisa Ramos
- Fermín Sánchez
- Lída Baarová

== Bibliography ==
- de España, Rafael. Directory of Spanish and Portuguese film-makers and films. Greenwood Press, 1994.
