= Luz Márquez =

Spanish actress

Luz Márquez (born María de la O García Márquez Soler; 12 December 1935 in Madrid, Spain), is a Spanish actress whose brief but intense acting career lasted ten years from 1956 to 1966. She appeared in more than 35 films, including Manolo Guardia Urbano (1956), 15 Bajo la Lona (1959), Adventures of the Bengal Lancers (1964), and the Audie Murphy film The Texican (1966). Marquez is best known for her role as Julia in the popular 1958 musical romance, Las chicas de la Cruz Roja (English: Red Cross Girls). She portrayed David's wife Abigail in Saul and David (1964) and also had a role as a Philistine woman in The Great Leaders (1965).

== Selected filmography ==
- Susanna tutta panna, regia di Steno (1957)
- Las chicas de la Cruz Roja (1958)
- Listen To My Song (1959)
- Call Esteban (1960)
- The Two Little Rascals (1961)
- Fuerte, Audaz y Valiente (1962)
- El Rey Del Tomate (1963)
- Saul and David (1964)
- The Great Leaders (1965)
- Agent 3S3: Massacre in the Sun (1966)
- The Texican (1966) Wikipedia
