= Faustino Bretaño =

Spanish actor

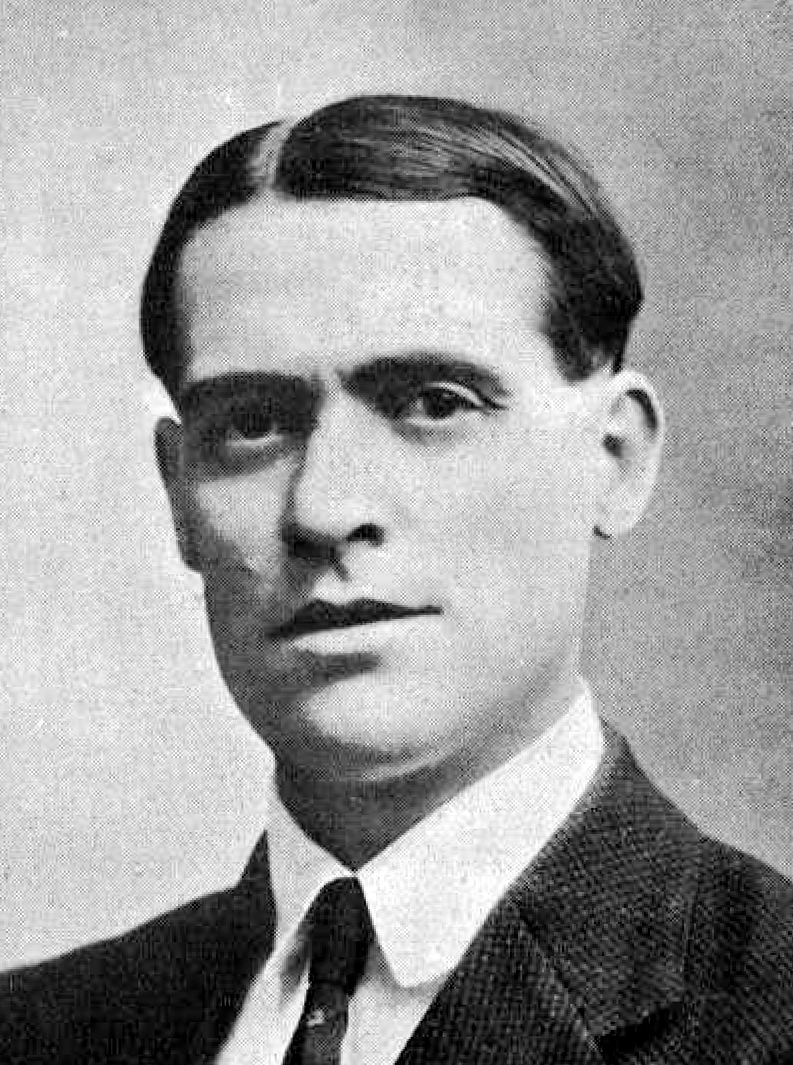
- Born: 1895
- Died: 1978 (aged 82–83); Spain
- Occupation: Actor
- Years active: 1926-1954 (film)

Faustino Bretaño (1895–1978) was a Spanish film actor.

== Selected filmography ==
- Currito of the Cross (1926)
- Lola Leaves for the Ports (1947)
- The Troublemaker (1950)
- Agustina of Aragon (1950)
- Dawn of America (1951)
- The Lioness of Castille (1951)
- Good News (1954)

== Bibliography ==
- Goble, Alan. The Complete Index to Literary Sources in Film. Walter de Gruyter, 1999.
