= Stowaway on Board =

- Directed by: Florián Rey
- Written by: Florián Rey
- Produced by: Cesáreo González
- Starring: Lina Yegros; Antonio Casal; Ismael Merlo; Salvador Videgain; Charito Leonis; Fernando Sancho
- Music by: Julio Soto; Modesto Rebollo
- Production company: Suevia Films
- Release date: 6 March 1941
- Running time: 89 minutes
- Country: Spain
- Language: Spanish

Stowaway on Board (Spanish:Polizón a bordo) is a 1941 Spanish comedy film directed by Florián Rey, co-starring Guadalupe Muñoz Sampedro and Ismael Merlo.

== Plot ==
Antonciño (Ismael Merlo) is planning to travel to America to find his love Rosiña (Lina Yegros), despite his poverty. He moves into the area under the pretense of being a rich man, with his friend Manucho (Antonio Casal). Rosiña, a younger and poor woman with dreams of buying a house, is unaware of Antonciño's activities. Matters become complicated as Antonio's poverty is discovered, along with Manucho's pretending to be poor. Rosiña remembers her friend Antonciño and becomes his lover again. Manucho throws a great party in the city for two days, causing trouble for the mayor (Salvador Videgain).

== Reception ==
Stowaway on Board was nominated for the best film of year in Spain.

== Bibliography ==
- Bentley, Bernard. A Companion to Spanish Cinema. Boydell & Brewer 2008.
