= Dawn of America =

1951 film

- Directed by: Juan de Orduña
- Written by: José Rodulfo Boeta; Luis Carrero Blanco; Juan de Orduña
- Starring: António Vilar; María Martín; José Suárez; Virgílio Teixeira
- Cinematography: Alfredo Fraile
- Edited by: Petra de Nieva
- Music by: Juan Quintero
- Production company: CIFESA
- Distributed by: CIFESA
- Release date: 20 December 1951
- Running time: 112 minutes
- Country: Spain
- Language: Spanish

Dawn of America (Spanish: Alba de América) is a 1951 Spanish historical adventure film directed by Juan de Orduña and starring António Vilar, María Martín and José Suárez. The film depicts the discovery of the Americas by Christopher Columbus in the late fifteenth century.

== Production ==
The film was made by the largest Spanish studio CIFESA. The production was conceived as a response to the 1949 British film Christopher Columbus. The British film had attempted a realist depiction of Columbus (portraying him as only partly successful, and his achievements being in spite of the Spanish monarchy). The Spanish response portrayed Columbus as a single-minded adventurer whose discovery led to the greater glory of the Spanish monarchy and the Catholic Church.

It was also designed as part of the celebrations for the 500th anniversary of the Catholic Monarchs. The film's patriotic theme was strongly backed by the Spanish State of Francisco Franco. The film was made on a comparatively large budget of ten million pesetas, part of which was supplied by the government. The film did not make a profit, partly due to its large budget and because the plot was not melodramatic enough for audience tastes. The film originally lost out on the prestigious National Interest prize to Furrows but José María García Escudero, who had made the decision, was removed and the prize was awarded to Dawn of America.

== Plot ==
The film narrates the adventures of Christopher Columbus (António Vilar) from his stay in the Convent of La Rábida to his meeting with the Catholic Monarchs and his feat in crossing the Atlantic and reaching the shores of America, ushering in a new era in the history of mankind.

== Cast ==
- António Vilar as Cristóbal Colón
- María Martín as Beatriz
- José Suárez as Rey Fernando el Católico
- Virgílio Teixeira as Pedro de Arana
- Manuel Luna as Isaac
- Eduardo Fajardo as Gastón
- Jesús Tordesillas as Fray Juan Pérez
- Ana María Custodio as Madre de Beatriz
- José Marco Davó as Martín Alonso Pinzón
- Ernesto Vilches as Cabrero
- Alberto Romea as Cardenal Mendoza
- Nicolás D. Perchicot as Fray Antonio de Marchena
- Fernando Sancho as Pedro Salcedo
- Francisco Pierrá as Miembro de la junta
- Arturo Marín as Pedro Vázquez de la Frontera
- Antonio Casas as Juan de la Cosa
- Faustino Bretaño as Mensajero que se arrodilla
- José Jaspe as Marinero
- Vicente Soler as Conde de Quintanilla
- Carlos Díaz de Mendoza as Miembro de la junta
- Alfonso Candel
- Joaquín Pujol
- Miguel Pastor as Pregonero
- Félix Dafauce as Villamarín
- Francisco Hernández
- José Sepúlveda as Cristóbal Sarniento
- Francisco Arenzana as Francisco Arias
- Ramón Elías
- Rafael Arcos as Mensajero del Rey
- Francisco Bernal as Posadero
- Luis Torrecilla
- Jacinto San Emeterio as Gonzalo de Córdoba
- Domingo Rivas as Duque de Medina
- Gary Land
- Antonio Almorós as Vicente Yáñez Pinzón
- Benito Cobeña
- Manrique Gil
- Pablo Álvarez Rubio
- Teófilo Palou as Secretario de la Corona
- Rafael Calvo Revilla as Secretario de la Corona
- Manuel Aguilera as Secretario de la Corona
- César Guzman
- Luis Rivera
- Carmen Capdepont
- José María Labernié
- Francisco Maroto
- Luis Fernandez
- José Riesgo as Miembro del consejo
- María Luisa D. de Velasco
- Rafael Cortés
- Amparo Rivelles as Reina Isabel la Católica

== Bibliography ==
- Bentley, Bernard P. E. (2008). A Companion to Spanish Cinema. Boydell & Brewer Ltd. ISBN 978-1-85566-176-9.
