= The Scandal (1943 film) =

1943 film by José Luis Sáenz de Heredia

- Directed by: José Luis Sáenz de Heredia
- Written by: José Luis Sáenz de Heredia
- Based on: The Scandal by Pedro Antonio de Alarcón
- Starring: Armando Calvo; Manuel Luna; Mercedes Vecino
- Cinematography: Michel Kelber
- Edited by: Julio Peña
- Music by: Manuel Parada
- Production company: Ballesteros
- Distributed by: Ballesteros
- Release date: 19 October 1943
- Running time: 120 minutes
- Country: Spain
- Language: Spanish

The Scandal (Spanish: El escándalo) is a 1943 Spanish drama film directed by José Luis Sáenz de Heredia and starring Armando Calvo, Manuel Luna and Mercedes Vecino. It is based on the novel The Scandal by Pedro Antonio de Alarcón.

== Synopsis ==
Fabián Conde, a gentleman accustomed to living life without considering the future or taking into account the moral damage that his actions may have on the society that surrounds him, realizes the terrible mistake of his existence and the spiritual emptiness of the.

== Cast ==
- Armando Calvo as Fabián Conde
- Manuel Luna as Diego
- Mercedes Vecino as Matilde
- Guillermo Marín as Lázaro
- Trini Montero as Gabriela
- Porfiria Sanchíz as Gregoria
- Juan Domenech as Gutiérrez
- Carlos Muñoz as Juan de Moncada
- Guillermina Grin as Beatriz de Haro
- Manuel París as Felipe Núñez
- Manuel Arbó as Don Jaime de la Guardia
- Joaquín Roa as Un caballero
- Concha Fernández as Leonor
- José Sáez de Tejada as Demetrio
- Juana Mansó as Francisca
- Ricardo Calvo as Padre Manrique
- José Luis Sáenz de Heredia as Croupier
- José Portes as Alcalde
- Manuel Requena

== Bibliography ==
- Labanyi, Jo & Pavlović, Tatjana. A Companion to Spanish Cinema. John Wiley & Sons, 2012.
