= Saul and David (film) =

- Directed by: Marcello Baldi
- Screenplay by: Ottavio Jemma; Flavio Nicolini; Marcello Baldi; Tonino Guerra; George Higgins III
- Based on: Books of Samuel in the Bible
- Produced by: Toni Di Carlo
- Starring: Norman Wooland; Gianni Garko
- Cinematography: Marcello Masciocchi
- Edited by: Giuliana Attenni
- Music by: Teo Usuelli
- Production companies: San Paolo Film (Rome); San Pablo Film (Madrid)
- Release date: 1964
- Running time: 115 minutes
- Countries: Italy; Spain
- Language: English
- Budget: $1,500,000

Saul and David (Italian: Saul e David) is a 1964 Italian-Spanish biblical epic film directed and co-written by Marcello Baldi. Based on the Books of Samuel, it stars Norman Wooland as King Saul and Gianni Garko as his successor, David.

== Cast ==
- Norman Wooland as Saul
- Gianni Garko as David
- Luz Márquez as Abigail
- Virgílio Teixeira as Abner
- Elisa Cegani as Ahinoam
- Pilar Clemens as Michal
- Carlos Casaravilla as Samuel
- Marco Paoletti as young David
- Paolo Gozlino as Joab
- Antonio Mayans as Jonathan (as Antony Mayans)
- Giorgio Cerioni
- Andrea Sciré as Saul's son
- Barta Barri (as Barta Barry)
- Dante Maggio
- Stefy Lang as Goliath

== Production ==
Saul and David is the second biblical film produced by a priest named Emilio Cordero, the head of San Paolo Film in Rome and San Pablo Film in Madrid. Cordero's first biblical production was The Patriarchs, but he reluctantly sold that film to Italian producer Dino De Laurentiis, who saw The Patriarchs as a competitor to his own film The Bible: In the Beginning... (1966). With the money De Laurentiis paid for the first film, Cordero planned to make other biblical films. Cordero described Saul and David as an effort "to break the ice of the world market."

Produced on a budget of $1,500,000, the film was shot on location in Almería and on the backlot of the Cinecittà studios in Rome. Writing for The New York Times, Robert F. Hawkins said, "An Italian director [Marcello Baldi] is in charge, firing instructions in a garbled but effective blend of languages at a cast principally made up of British, Italian and Spanish actors, all of whom mouth a colorful, if not always intelligible, brand of English, the language in which it is being recorded." 50 technicians worked on the film, and 6,000 extras, 5,000 horses, and 1,000 camels appeared in it.

The film was one of a series of 24 three-hour biblical films (12 for each Testament) planned by San Paolo that would take more than ten years to film and cost between $16 and $20 million.

== Reception ==
In August 1965, Reuters reported that Saul and David "received formidable reviews when shown recently at a large cinema in Rome." Segnalazioni cinematografiche (Film Reports) gave the film a positive review: "The film includes the events narrated in the Bible in the first book of Kings. Faithfully following the Sacred Text, it translates with a balanced sense of spectacle the dramatic religious and psychological conflict between the first King of Israel and the man who will succeed him. The film, directed with commitment, benefits from good acting and evocative color photography."

A percentage of the film's profits were reserved for San Paolo's charitable activities and the rest of the earnings were invested in making more films.
