= José F. Aguayo =

Spanish photographer and cinematographer

- Born: José Fernández Aguayo; 1911; Madrid, Spain
- Died: 11 May 1999 (aged 87–88); Madrid, Spain
- Occupation: Photography director
- Father: Baldomero Fernández Raigón

José Fernández Aguayo (1911 – 11 May 1999) was a Spanish photography director. Throughout his career, he worked with some of the greatest Spanish film directors, such as Luis Buñuel and Fernando Fernán-Gómez.

== Life and career ==
Aguayo, born in Madrid, was the son of bullfighting photographer Baldomero Fernández Raigón. He was an amateur bullfighter in his youth, but he earned his living as a photographer. He entered the film world after having worked on a report about the filming of Currito de la Cruz. He was hired as an assistant to operator Enrique Guerner. He worked as a reporter for the Second Spanish Republic and the Junta de Defensa de Madrid (Board of Defence of Madrid), circumstances which forced him to use his second last name to continue developing his career, as a reporter. Among his work, the following stand out: Locura de amor (Craziness of Love), Dónde vas Alfonso XII (Where are you Going Alphonse XII), Viridiana, El extraño viaje (The Strange Journey) and Tristana. He stopped his professional activities in 1983.

Year	Award	Notes	Ref.
1986	1st Goya Awards	Honorary Goya Award	

== Selected filmography ==
- Castanet (1945)
- Unknown Path (1946)
- Lola Leaves for the Ports (1947)
- The Princess of the Ursines (1947)
- Anguish (1947)
- Madness for Love (1948)
- Night Arrival (1949)
- Currito of the Cross (1949)
- Tempest (1949)
- Tormented Soul (1950)
- Devil's Roundup (1952)
- Come Die My Love (1952)
- The Floor Burns (1952)
- Amaya (1952)
- Two Paths (1954)
- Father Cigarette (1955)
- The Legion of Silence (1956)
- Curra Veleta (1956)
- The Last Torch Song (1957)
- The Sun Comes Out Every Day (1958)
- Where Are You Going, Alfonso XII? (1959)
- Alfonso XII and María Cristina (1960)
- A Girl from Chicago (1960)
- The Mustard Grain (1962)
- The Blackmailers (1963)
- Tomy's Secret (1963)
- The Twin Girls (1963)
- Currito of the Cross (1965)
- Road to Rocío (1966)
- Another's Wife (1967)
- Fruit of Temptation (1968)
- The Sailor with Golden Fists (1968)
- A Decent Adultery (1969)
- The Man Who Wanted to Kill Himself (1970)
- Nothing Less Than a Real Man (1972)
- The Doubt (1972)
- The King is the Best Mayor (1974)
- The Good Days Lost (1975)
- Death's Newlyweds (1975)
- Forget the Drums (1975)
- Two Men and Two Women Amongst Them (1977)
- And in the Third Year, He Rose Again (1980)
- Spoiled Children (1980)
- The Cheerful Colsada Girls (1984)
