= The Little Nightingale =

- El pequeño ruiseñor
- Directed by: Antonio del Amo
- Written by: Antonio Guzmán Merino
- Cinematography: César Fraile
- Edited by: Petra de Nieva
- Music by: Antonio Valero
- Production company: Argos SL.
- Release date: 1956
- Running time: 98 minutes
- Country: Spain
- Language: Spanish

The Little Nightingale (Spanish:El pequeño ruiseñor) is a 1956 Spanish musical film directed by Antonio del Amo.

It was the first film to star child singer Joselito. It skyrocketed him to fame. The film is the first of a trilogy dubbed «trilogía del ruiseñor». It was followed by Saeta del ruiseñor (1957) and El ruiseñor de las cumbres (1958). The success of the films allowed del Amo to set up his own production company Apolo Films with studios on the outskirts of Madrid.

== Plot ==
Joselito is a boy whose mother left town when he was just a newborn. He lives with the grandfather, the village bell ringer, and his best friend is the sacristan. A fan of singing, he has not given up hope of ever meeting his mother.

== Cast ==
- Joselito, the boy singer.
- Aníbal Vela, the priest.
- Mario Berritúa, Father Jesús.
- Lina Canalejas, Fuensanta.
- Mariano Azaña, Martín the sexton.
- Carmen Sánchez, Romualda.

== Bibliography ==
- D'Lugo, Marvin. Guide to the Cinema of Spain. Greenwood Publishing, 1997.
- Martínez Torres, Augusto (1999). Cine español. Diccionario Espasa. Madrid: Espasa-Calpe. ISBN 84-239-9451-1.
