= Devil's Roundup =

1952 film

- Directed by: Antonio del Amo; Enrique Gómez; Edgar Neville; José Antonio Nieves Conde; Arturo Ruiz Castillo
- Written by: Camilo José Cela; José María Elorrieta; Gumersindo Montes Agudo; Edgar Neville; José Antonio Pérez Torreblanca; Gonzalo Torrente Ballester
- Starring: Fernando Aguirre; Margarita Andrey
- Cinematography: José F. Aguayo; Heinrich Gartner
- Edited by: Sara Ontañón
- Music by: Jesús García Leoz
- Production companies: Guadalupe; Mercurio Films
- Distributed by: Mercurio Films
- Release date: 25 August 1952
- Running time: 86 minutes
- Country: Spain
- Language: Spanish

Devil's Roundup (Spanish: El cerco del diablo) is a 1952 Spanish drama film directed by Antonio del Amo, Enrique Gómez, Edgar Neville, José Antonio Nieves Conde and Arturo Ruiz Castillo.

== Cast ==
- Fernando Aguirre as Pescador
- Margarita Andrey as Muchacha
- Valeriano Andrés as Policía
- Julio Ballesteros as General
- Rafael Bardem as Marido
- José Bódalo as Hombre
- Antonio Casas
- Manuel de Juan as Barman
- Manuel Dicenta as Cómplice
- Julio Ferrer as Griego
- Juan García del Diestro as Jugador
- Manrique Gil as Ventero
- José María Lado as Padre
- Agustín Laguilhoat as Revisor
- Concha López Silva as Bruja
- Guillermo Marín as Diablo
- Manuel Medina as Atracador
- Trini Montero as Moza
- Conchita Montes as Eva
- Gina Montes as Otra moza
- José Prada as Inspector
- Luis Prendes as Buhonero
- Fernando Rey as Atracador
- José Riesgo
- Antonio Riquelme
- Horacio Socías as Boticario
- Virgílio Teixeira as Ángel
- José Telmo as Diplomático
- Tilda Thamar as Susana
- Ángel Álvarez as Cajero

== Bibliography ==
- Betz, Mark. Beyond the Subtitle: Remapping European Art Cinema. U of Minnesota Press, 2009.
