= María Mahor =

Spanish actress

- Born: María Concepción Martínez Horcajada; June 18, 1940 (age 85); Madrid, Spain
- Occupation: Actress
- Years active: 1957–1975 (film)

María Concepción Martínez Horcajada known professionally as María Mahor is a retired Spanish film actress.

== Selected filmography ==
- Legions of the Nile (1959)
- Luxury Cabin (1959)
- Peaches in Syrup (1960)
- The Prince in Chains (1960)
- The Little Colonel (1960)
- Axel Munthe, The Doctor of San Michele (1962)
- The Daughters of Helena (1963)
- Seven Vengeful Women (1966)
- Blueprint for a Massacre (1967)
- More Dollars for the MacGregors (1970)

== Bibliography ==
- Thomas Weisser. Spaghetti Westerns: the Good, the Bad and the Violent. McFarland, 2005.
