= Cesáreo González =

Spanish film producer (1903–1968)

- Born: Cesáreo González Rodríguez; 29 May 1903; Vigo (Pontevedra), Spain
- Died: 20 March 1968 (aged 64); Madrid, Spain
- Occupation: film producer

Cesáreo González Rodríguez (1903–1968) was a Spanish film producer.

González was born in 1903 in Vigo, Spain. When he was 12, he took a boat to Cuba and worked as a salesman. He would later work in Mexico at his uncle's bakery, and return to Spain as a young adult.

In 1940, he began a production company called Suevia Films. Its first release was Stowaway on Board (1941), a film starring Florian Rey, in 1941. He would go on to produce over 100 films. González chose local Spanish talent to act and perform music in his films, such as folk singer Lola Flores, actress María Félix, comedian Pepe Iglesias, and child prodigy Joselito. He would later produce under the name Cesáreo González Producciones Cinematográficas. He died in Madrid in 1968.

== Selected filmography ==
- Stowaway on Board (1941)
- The Wheel of Life (1942)
- Bambú (1945)
- The Emigrant (1946)
- The Prodigal Woman (1946)
- The Holy Queen (1947)
- La Fé (1947)
- Botón de Ancla (1947)
- La nao Capitana (1947)
- Mare Nostrum (1948)
- Saturday Night (1950)
- La corona negra (1950)
- Apollo Theatre (1950)
- La trinca del aire (1951)
- Messalina (1951)
- La Señora de Fátima (1951)
- Imperial Violets (1952)
- Estrella of the Sierra Morena (1952)
- Feather in the Wind (1952)
- Pena, penita, pena (1953)
- La bella Otero (1954)
- He Died Fifteen Years Ago (1954)
- Camelia (1954)
- La Faraona (1955)
- The Other Life of Captain Contreras (1955)
- Limosna de amores (1955)
- Faustina (1956)
- Calle Mayor (1957)
- La Guerra Empieza en Cuba (1957)
- The Nightingale in the Mountains (1958)
- The Song of the Nightingale (1959)
- Listen To My Song (1959)
- The Little Colonel (1960)
- Pecado de amor (1961)
- The Balcony of the Moon (1962)
- The Fair of the Dove (1963)
- The Blackmailers (1963)
- Tomy's Secret (1963)
- Pedrito de Andía's New Life (1965)
