= The Seventh Page =

1951 film

- Directed by: Ladislao Vajda
- Written by: Ángel Gamón; José Santugini
- Produced by: Vicente Sempere
- Starring: Adriano Domínguez; Raúl Cancio; Carlota Bilbao
- Cinematography: Willy Goldberger
- Edited by: Antonio Martínez
- Music by: Jesús García Leoz
- Production company: Peninsular Films
- Distributed by: Selecciones Fuster
- Release date: 10 October 1951
- Running time: 84 minutes
- Country: Spain
- Language: Spanish

The Seventh Page (Spanish: Séptima página) is a 1951 Spanish drama film directed by Ladislao Vajda and starring Adriano Domínguez, Raúl Cancio and Carlota Bilbao. The film's sets were designed by the art director Francisco Canet. Shot on location in Madrid where it is set, it has elements of neorealism.

== Cast ==
- Adriano Domínguez as Méndez
- Raúl Cancio as Dieguito
- Carlota Bilbao as Telefonista
- José María Rodero as Carlos
- Rafael Arcos as Fernando Montalvo
- Paquito Cano as Amigo de Fernando
- Luis Prendes as Manolo
- Alfredo Mayo as Paco
- Anita Dayna as Maruja Ramos
- Rafael Durán as Fuentes
- Rafael Romero Marchent as Javier
- María Asquerino as Leonor
- José Sepúlveda as Comisario
- Jesús Tordesillas as Arrosti
- María Rosa Salgado as Isabel
- José Isbert as Vendedor de bolsos
- Julia Caba Alba as Criada de Maruja
- Joaquín Roa as Ardilla, carterista
- Manuel Arbó as Padre de Fernando
- Santiago Rivero as Periodista
- José Prada as Doctor Vargas
- Eloísa Muro as madre de Isabel
- Carlos Díaz de Mendoza as Gerente del Club Montecarlo
- Manuel Aguilera as dueño del cabaret Ébano
- Francisco Arenzana as Robles

== Bibliography ==
- Hortelano, Lorenzo J. Torres. Directory of World Cinema: Spain. Intellect Books, 2011.
- Oliete-Aldea, Elena, Oria, Beatriz & Tarancón Juan A. Global Genres, Local Films: The Transnational Dimension of Spanish Cinema. Bloomsbury Publishing USA, 2015.
