= Pedrito de Andía's New Life =

- Directed by: Rafael Gil
- Written by: Rafael Gil; Antonio de Jaén; Rafael Sánchez Mazas (novel)
- Produced by: Cesáreo González
- Starring: Joselito; Karin Mossberg; Carmen Bernardos
- Cinematography: Gábor Pogány
- Edited by: José Luis Matesanz
- Music by: Manuel Parada
- Production company: Suevia Films
- Distributed by: Suevia Films
- Release date: 6 September 1965
- Running time: 96 minutes
- Country: Spain
- Language: Spanish

Pedrito de Andía's New Life (Spanish:La vida nueva de Pedrito de Andía) is a 1965 Spanish film directed by Rafael Gil and starring Joselito, Karin Mossberg and Carmen Bernardos.

== Cast ==
- Joselito as Pedrito de Andía
- Karin Mossberg as Isabel
- Carmen Bernardos as Tía Clara
- José María Seoane
- Rafael Durán
- Elena Duque
- Lucía Prado
- Carlota Bilbao
- Concha Goyanes as Edurne
- Chonette Laurent
- María Jesús Corchero
- Soledad Gimeno
- Jaime Blanch as William Adanson
- María del Carmen González
- Mer Casas
- Luis Induni
- Ricardo Turia
- Manuel Soriano
- Fernando Alcaide
- Carlos Hernán
- María Jesús Balenciaga
- Luis Ángel 'Pipo' Molia
- Lina Rosales

== Bibliography ==
- Bentley, Bernard. A Companion to Spanish Cinema. Boydell & Brewer 2008.
