= Three Sparrows and a Bit =

- Directed by: Antonio del Amo
- Written by: Concepción Santamaría; Antonio del Amo
- Cinematography: Santiago Crespo
- Music by: Manuel Parada
- Production company: Apolo Films
- Distributed by: Universal Films Española
- Release date: 1964
- Running time: 72 minutes
- Country: Spain
- Language: Spanish

Three Sparrows and a Bit (Spanish: Tres gorriones y pico) is a 1964 Spanish film directed by Antonio del Amo.

== Cast ==
- Marta Baizán
- Roberto Cruz
- Luis Mariano Duque
- José Luis López Vázquez
- José Marco
- Raúl Martinea Victoriano
- Mary Paz Pondal
- Enrique San Francisco

== Bibliography ==
- de España, Rafael. Directory of Spanish and Portuguese film-makers and films. Greenwood Press, 1994.
