= I Must Abandon You =

- Directed by: Antonio del Amo
- Written by: Corín Tellado
- Cinematography: Federico G. Larraya
- Music by: Waldo de los Ríos
- Production company: Apolo Films
- Distributed by: Warner Brothers
- Release date: 1969
- Running time: 109 minutes
- Country: Spain
- Language: Spanish

I Must Abandon You (Spanish: Tengo que abandonarte) is a 1969 Spanish film directed by Antonio del Amo.

== Cast ==
- Tomás Blanco
- Ana María Mendoza
- Gisia Paradís
- Esther Riera
- Maribel Sáez
- Jaime Toja
- Juan Trenchs

== Bibliography ==
- de España, Rafael. Directory of Spanish and Portuguese film-makers and films. Greenwood Press, 1994.
