= Jaime Blanch =

Spanish film and television actor

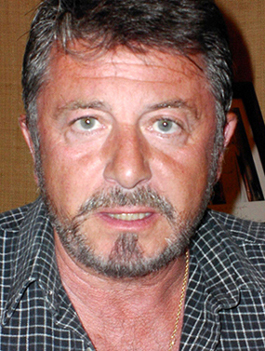
- Blanch in 2012.
- Born: Jaime Blanch Montijano; 9 September 1940 (age 85); Collado Villalba (Madrid), Spain
- Occupation: Actor
- Years active: 1952-

Jaime Blanch Montijano (born 1940) is a Spanish film and television actor. He was the nephew of the theater actress Montserrat Blanch.

== Selected filmography ==
- Gloria Mairena (1952)
- I Was a Parish Priest (1953)
- Jeromin (1953)
- An Andalusian Gentleman (1954)
- An Angel Has Arrived (1961)
- La gran familia (1962)
- Como dos gotas de agua (1963)
- Pedrito de Andía's New Life (1965)
- Forget the Drums (1975)
- The Day of the Beast (1995)
- El Ministerio del Tiempo (2015-2020)

== Bibliography ==
- Goble, Alan. The Complete Index to Literary Sources in Film. Walter de Gruyter, 1999.
