= Agustina of Aragon (1950 film) =

1950 film

- Directed by: Juan de Orduña
- Written by: Vicente Escrivá; Ángel Fernández Marrero; Juan de Orduña; Clemente Pamplona
- Starring: Aurora Bautista
- Cinematography: Theodore J. Pahle; Mariano Ruiz Capillas
- Edited by: Petra de Nieva
- Music by: Juan Quintero
- Production company: CIFESA
- Distributed by: CIFESA
- Release date: 9 October 1950
- Running time: 126 minutes
- Country: Spain
- Language: Spanish

Agustina of Aragon (Spanish: Agustina de Aragón) is a 1950 Spanish historical film directed by Juan de Orduña and starring Aurora Bautista. It is also known by the alternative title of The Siege. It portrays the Spanish patriot Agustina of Aragon, known for her role at the 1808 Siege of Zaragoza against Napoleon's French forces.

The film's sets were designed by Sigfrido Burmann. It was made by CIFESA, Spain's largest studio.

== Plot ==
French troops led by Napoleon besiege the city of Zaragoza. Agustina de Aragón (Aurora Bautista) is a young woman who, upon learning that her boyfriend has sold out to the enemy, breaks up with him and falls in love with a Baturro guerrilla. In one of the French attacks, a grenade exploded near the position where Agustina was, blowing over the soldiers defending the position and there was a threat that the enemy troops could enter the city. Gustine walked through the dead and wounded to a cannon and opened fire. Surprise gripped both sides. Thus, Agustina managed to maintain the situation until Spanish reinforcements arrived.

== Cast ==
- Aurora Bautista as Agustina
- Fernando Aguirre
- Valeriano Andrés as Capitán con Gobernador
- Manuel Arbó as Padre
- María Asquerino as Carmen
- Francisco Bernal as Paleto
- Faustino Bretaño
- José Bódalo as Capitán francés
- Raúl Cancio as Maño
- María Cañete as Tía Pilar
- Alfonso de Córdoba
- Eugenio Domingo as Niño en iglesia
- Adriano Domínguez
- Juan Espantaleón as Tío Jorge
- Eduardo Fajardo as Luis Montana
- Fernando Fernández de Córdoba as Gobernador
- Félix Fernández
- Rosario García Ortega
- José Jaspe
- Manuel Luna as Tío Francisco
- Arturo Marín
- Guillermo Marín as Napoléon Bonaparte
- Pilar Muñoz
- Fernando Nogueras as Fernando
- José Orjas
- Miguel Pastor as Mariscal Lacoste
- Nicolás D. Perchicot as Viejo con niño
- Francisco Pierrá
- Antonia Plana as Madre de Juan
- Fernando Rey as General Palafox / Lorenzo, el pastor
- Fernando Sancho as Escudella
- Virgílio Teixeira as Juan, el Bravo
- Jesús Tordesillas as Coronel Torres
- Aníbal Vela as Emisario del Mariscal Lacoste
- Juan Vázquez
- Pablo Álvarez Rubio

== Bibliography ==
- Klossner, Michael. The Europe of 1500-1815 on Film and Television: A Worldwide Filmography of Over 2550 Works, 1895 Through 2000. McFarland & Company, 2002.
