= Afternoon of the Bulls =

1956 film directed by Ladislao Vajda

- Italian poster
- Directed by: Ladislao Vajda
- Written by: Julio Coll; José Santugini; Manuel Tamayo
- Starring: Manuel Arbó
- Cinematography: Heinrich Gärtner
- Edited by: Julio Peña
- Release date: 24 February 1956
- Running time: 75 minutes
- Country: Spain
- Language: Spanish

Afternoon of the Bulls (Spanish: Tarde de toros) is a 1956 Spanish drama film directed by Ladislao Vajda. It was entered into the 1956 Cannes Film Festival. The film was selected as the Spanish entry for the Best Foreign Language Film at the 29th Academy Awards, but was not accepted as a nominee.

== Plot ==
In the bullring of Las Ventas, in Madrid, four parallel stories are shown in the film: the senior bullfighter Ricardo Puente breaks up with his lover Paloma; the winner of the day, Juan Carmona is barely hurt by a bull because he is haunted with the notice of a new baby; Rondeño II is afraid of the bulls and afraid of the wedding with his girlfriend Ana María; finally, an innocent amateur torero dies on the sand.

== Selected cast ==
- Manuel Arbó as Vecino de la actriz
- Rafael Bardem as Amigo 1º
- Félix Dafauce as Médico de la plaza
- José Isbert as Don Felipe
- Manolo Morán as Jiménez
- Antonio Prieto as Enterado 1º
- Jesús Tordesillas as Luis Montes
- Juan Calvo as Don Cesar

== See also ==
- List of submissions to the 29th Academy Awards for Best Foreign Language Film
- List of Spanish submissions for the Academy Award for Best Foreign Language Film
