= Joan Capri =

Catalan actor and humorist

- Born: July 10, 1917; Barcelona
- Died: February 4, 2000 (aged 82)
- Occupation: humorist
- Years active: 20th century
- Known for: Irony monologues

Joan Capri (Barcelona, July 10, 1917 - Barcelona, February 4, 2000) was a Catalan actor, humorist, and monologuist. His real name was Joan Camprubí i Alemany. His participation in plays and monologues made him an emblem of Catalan humor in the 20th century. With a kindly but incisive irony, he became a caricature of the average urban Catalan that made several generations laugh.

Capri's discs, with his recorded monologues, became very popular in Catalonia, even surpassing the Beatles sales in 1964.

== Works ==
=== Filmography ===
- 1953 Vuelo 971. Director: Rafael J. Salvia.
- 1953 Concierto mágico. Director: Rafael J. Salvia.
- 1953 Juzgado permanente. Director: Joaquín Luis Romero Marchent.
- 1954 El padre Pitillo. Director: Juan de Orduña.
- 1954 Cañas y barro. Director: Juan de Orduña.
- 1955 Zalacaín el aventurero. Director: Juan de Orduña.
- 1955 El fugitivo de Amberes. Director: Miguel Iglesias.
- 1956 La legión del silencio. Director: José María Forqué.
- 1956 Sucedió en mi aldea
- 1957 Juanillo, papá y mamá. Director: Lorenzo Gicca Palli.
- 1957 Un tesoro en el cielo
- 1958 El azar se divierte
- 1958 Avenida Roma, 66
- 1961 Juventud a la intemperie. Director: Ignacio F. Iquino
- 1962 Los castigadores. Director: Alfonso Balcázar.
- 1964 Los felices 60. Director: Jaime Camino
- 1968 En Baldiri de la costa. Director: Josep Maria Font
- 1969 L'advocat, l'alcalde i el notari. Director: Josep Maria Font.

=== Television ===
- 1979 Doctor Caparrós. RTVE. Ondas award.
- 1990 Amb l'aigua al coll. TV3.

=== Discography ===
- 1961 El Casament (de "El fiscal Recasens") de Josep Maria de Sagarra - El nàufrag . Vergara.
- 1961 El Desmemoriat -El maniàtic . Vergara.
- 1962 De Madrid a Barcelona en tercera / L'inventor. Vergara
- 1963 La Guerra del 600 -Les pastilles . Vergara.
- 1963 El descontent / Pobre Gonzalez!. Vergara
- 1664 Si vols una noia / Si vols un noi. Vergara
- 1964 La Ciutat - Ja tenim minyona . Vergara.
- 1965 Parla Mossèn Ventura. Vergara
- 1965 El Desorientat - Com està la plaça. Vergara.
- 1965 Dites i fets de mossèn Ventura . Vergara. (LP)
- 1966 Els savis / Acabarem ximples. Vergara
- 1967 El pis i l'estalvi / La tia Amèlia. Vergara
- 1967 Futbolitis / La vida és un serial. Vergara
- 1967 El casament + 5 més. Vergara (LP)
- 1967 El nàufrag + 5 més. Vegara (LP)
- 1968 El suïcidi / Vivendes protegides. Vergara
- 1968 No som res / Ja som algú. Vergara
- 1968 Futbolitis + 5 més. Vergara (LP)
- 1969 El pobre viudo. Vergara (LP) - Original de Santiago Rusiñol, Gravat en directe al Teatre Romea
- 1970 La tele / La moda maxi. Ariola
- 1971 L'Enterramorts. Ariola.
- 1971 Parla Mossèn Ventura + 4 més. Ariola-Eurodisc (LP)
- 1972 El mandrós. Ariola
- 1974 El Cinturó de Ronda / La primera comunió. Ariola
- 1975 Quina tia / El món és així. Ariola
- 1976 El taxista / Mengem massa!!!. Ariola
- 1976 Com està la plaça + 4 més. Gramusic (LP)
- 1977 El taxista + 6 més. Ariola (LP)
- 1997 El Millor Joan Capri. BMG Music Spain (2 CD).
