= Petra de Nieva =

Spanish film editor

- Occupation: Film editor
- Years active: 1941–1978

Petra de Nieva (aka Petrita Nieva) was a prolific Spanish film editor who worked in the industry from the 1940s through the 1970s.

== Selected filmography ==
- Vote for Gundisalvo (1978)
- Hasta que el matrimonio nos separe (1977)
- Nosotros que fuimos tan felices (1976)
- El asesino está entre los trece (1976)
- La mujer es cosa de hombres (1976)
- El mejor regalo (1975)
- El insólito embarazo de los Martínez (1974)
- The New Spaniards (1974)
- Tocata y fuga de Lolita (1974)
- Con la música a otra parte (1974)
- The Ghost Galleon (1974)
- Señora doctor (1974)
- Vida conyugal sana (1974)
- La llamaban La Madrina (1973)
- Count Dracula's Great Love (1973)
- Hunchback of the Morgue (1973)
- Soltero y padre en la vida (1972)
- El triangulito (1972)
- Dr. Jekyll vs. The Werewolf (1972)
- Ligue Story (1972)
- Españolas en París (1971)
- Pierna creciente, falda menguante (1970)
- El monumento (1970)
- Unmarried and Mother in Life (1969)
- La que arman las mujeres (1969)
- The Wanton of Spain (1969)
- Adiós cordera (1969)
- Una vez al año ser hippy no hace daño (1969)
- La dinamita está servida (1968)
- Los que tocan el piano (1968)
- Los subdesarrollados (1968)
- Un diablo bajo la almohada (1968)
- Las que tienen que servir (1967)
- La Barrera (1966)
- Mission Bloody Mary (1965)
- El pecador y la bruja (1964)
- Tengo 17 años (1964)
- The Adventures of Scaramouche (1963)
- ¿Chico o chica? (1962)
- De la piel del diablo (1962)
- Bello recuerdo (1961)
- Los dos golfillos (1961)
- El pequeño coronel (1960)
- El amor que yo te di (1960)
- Escucha mi canción (1959)
- Saeta del ruiseñor (1959)
- El ruiseñor de las cumbres (1958)
- El sol sale todos los días (1958)
- El pequeño ruiseñor (1957)
- La legión del silencio (1956)
- Retorno a la verdad (1956)
- Encuentro en la ciudad (1956)
- Un día perdido (1955)
- Summer's Clouds (1955)
- Tangier Assignment (1955)
- Brindis al cielo (1954)
- María Dolores (1953)
- Dawn of America (1951)
- The Lioness of Castille (1951)
- The Siege (1950)
- Trifles (1950)
- Siempre vuelven de madrugada (1949)
- Confidences (1948)
- Alhucemas (1948)
- La Lola se va a los puertos (1947)
- Dos mujeres y un rostro (1947)
- Spanish Serenade (1947)
- Cero en conducta (1945)
- Con los ojos del alma (1943)
- Goyescas (1941)
