= Juan de Orduña =

Spanish film director

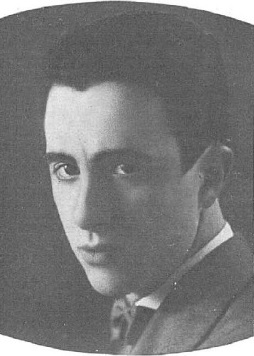
- Juan de Orduña in 1927
- Born: Juan de Orduña y Fernández-Shaw; 27 December 1900; Madrid, Spain
- Died: 3 February 1974 (age 73); Madrid, Spain

Juan de Orduña y Fernández-Shaw (27 December 1900 – 3 February 1974) was a Spanish film director, screenwriter and actor. Subservient to the ideological tenets and preferences of Francoism, he was one of the regime's standout directors during the autarchy period. Nevertheless, his film "Follow the Legion" has been seen as a disguised story of homosexual love, and de Orduña was a homosexual. He particularly earned recognition for his epic-historicist films, including the extravagant Madness for Love (1948), "an immense commercial success".

== Filmography ==
- Me has hecho perder el juicio (1973)
- Eusébio, la Pantera Negra (1973)
- El caserío (1972)
- El huésped del sevillano (1970)
- The Complete Idiot (1970)
- Bohemios (1969)
- La canción del olvido (1969)
- The Troublemaker (1969)
- Farewell to Marriage (1968)
- Maruxa (1968)
- Anónima de asesinos (1967)
- Abajo espera la muerte (1966)
- Aragonese Nobility (1965)
- Bochorno (1963)
- El amor de los amores (1962)
- Teresa de Jesús (1961)
- La tirana (1958)
- Música de ayer (1958)
- The Last Torch Song (1957)
- Father Cigarette (1955)
- Zalacaín el aventurero (1955)
- Cañas y barro (1954)
- Dawn of America (1951)
- The Lioness of Castille (1951)
- Agustina of Aragon (1950)
- Pequeñeces (1950)
- Tormented Soul (1950)
- Tempest (1949)
- Mi enemigo el doctor (1948)
- Madness for Love (1948)
- Lola Leaves for the Ports (1947)
- Serenata española (1947)
- A New Play (1946)
- Leyenda de feria (1946)
- White Mission (1946)
- Ella, él y sus millones (1944)
- Life Begins at Midnight (1944)
- Yo no me caso (1944)
- Tuvo la culpa Adán (1944)
- Deliciosamente tontos (1943)
- Autumn Roses (1943)
- Nostalgia (1942)
- El frente de los suspiros (1942)
- Follow the Legion (1942)
- Porque te vi llorar (1941)
- Suite granadina (1940)
- Feria en Sevilla (1940)
- Una aventura de cine (1928)
- The Troublemaker (1924)
