= Joselito vagabundo =

1966 film by Miguel Morayta

- Starring: Sara García
- Release date: 1966
- Running time: 88 minute
- Country: Mexico
- Language: Spanish

Joselito vagabundo ("Joselito Vagabond") is a 1966 Mexican film. It stars Sara García and features child singer Joselito. It was directed by Miguel Morayta.
