= Porfiria Sanchíz =

Spanish actress

- Born: 15 June 1917; Cádiz, Andalucía, Spain
- Died: 9 January 1983 (aged 65); Spain
- Occupation: Actress
- Years active: 1935-1975 (film)

Porfiria Sanchíz (1917–1983) was a Spanish film actress.

== Selected filmography ==
- Juan Simón's Daughter (1935)
- Saint Rogelia (1940)
- The Scandal (1943)
- Public Trial (1946)
- Unknown Path (1946)
- Mare Nostrum (1948)
- Black Sky (1951)
- A Tale of Two Villages (1951)
- El Negro que tenía el alma blanca (1951)
- Amaya (1952)
- He Died Fifteen Years Ago (1954)
- The Cock Crow (1955)
- Fedra (1956)
- Sonatas (1959)
- A Girl from Chicago (1960)
- The Two Little Rascals (1961)
- The Twin Girls (1963)

== Bibliography ==
- Luis Mariano González. Fascismo, kitsch y cine histórico español, 1939-1953. Univ de Castilla La Mancha, 2009.
