= Virgílio Teixeira =

Portuguese actor (1917–2010)

- Born: Virgílio Delgado Teixeira; 26 October 1917; Funchal, Portugal
- Died: 5 December 2010 (aged 93); Funchal, Portugal
- Occupation: actor
- Years active: 1943–2010
- Spouse: Vanda Teixeira (?-2010) (his death)

Virgílio Delgado Teixeira (26 October 1917 – 5 December 2010) was a Portuguese film, television and stage actor, known for roles in Portuguese, Spanish and American films. He was known as a Portuguese "heartthrob" and a leading actor during the 1940s, 1950s and 1960s.

Teixeira was born in Funchal, Madeira, on 26 October 1917. He began his career in Portuguese and Spanish cinema before taking roles in Hollywood productions. Teixeira made his film debut in the 1943 film, Ave de Arribação. In 1948, Teixeira portrayed Julio, the love interest of Amalia Rodrigues's character, in Fado, História de uma Cantadeira, which was directed by Perdigão Queiroga. His later work in Portuguese film and television included A Mulher do Próximo in 1982 and the telenovela, Chuva na Areia, in 1984.

Teixeira's Hollywood credits included roles in Alexander the Great, Return of the Seven, and Doctor Zhivago.

Additionally, Teixeira served as the first director of the Centro das Comunidades Madeirenses.

Virgílio Teixeira was married to Vanda Teixeira. He died in Funchal, Madeira, of respiratory problems on 5 December 2010, at the age of 93. President of the Regional Government of Madeira Alberto João Jardim called Teixeira a "Great Madeiran" following his death.

== Selected filmography ==
- O Costa do Castelo (1943)
- Ave de Arribação (1943) - The fisherman
- Um Homem às Direitas (1945) - José
- A Noiva do Brasil (1945) - Manuel de Medeiros, first
- José do Telhado (1945) - José do Telhado
- Cero en conducta (1945) - Siqueira
- Cais do Sodré (1946) - Toino Ventura
- Ladrão, Precisa-se!... (1946) - José
- La mantilla de Beatriz (1946) - D. Luis de Meneses
- The Holy Queen (1947) - Alfonso Sánchez
- Three Mirrors (1947) - Miguel
- Fado, História d'uma Cantadeira (1947) - Júlio Guitarrista
- Extraño amanecer (1948)
- Amanhã Como Hoje (1948) - (uncredited)
- El verdugo (1948)
- Uma Vida para Dois (1949) - Mário Vilar
- Heróis do Mar (1949) - João Manuel
- The Bad Lord Byron (1949) - Pietro Gamba
- Ribatejo (1949) - António, the bulls' wrangler
- A Volta de José do Telhado (1949) - José do Telhado
- Tempest (1949) - Capitán Mir
- Flor de lago (1950)
- Yo no soy la Mata-Hari (1950) - Richard / Tte. Jorjof
- Agustina of Aragon (1950) - Juan, el Bravo
- Saturday Night (1950) - Nunú
- Torturados (1950) - Raúl
- The Lioness of Castille (1951) - Pedro de Guzmán
- Dawn of America (1951) - Pedro de Arana
- Lola the Coalgirl (1952) - Capitán Gustavo Lefevre
- Devil's Roundup (1952) - Ángel
- Nazaré (1952) - António 'Tonho' Manata
- La hija del mar (1953) - Tomás Pedro
- Cañas y barro (1954) - Tonet
- Zalacaín el aventurero (1955) - Martín Zalacaín
- La hermana alegría (1955)
- Father Cigarette (1955)
- Nubes de verano (1955) - Carlos
- Un día perdido (1955) - Andrés
- Alexander the Great (1956) - Ptolemy
- Perdeu-se um Marido (1957) - Eduardo
- Dois Dias no Paraíso (1957) - Eduardo Pimentel
- La estrella del rey (1957) - Leopoldo
- Polvorilla (1957)
- The 7th Voyage of Sinbad (1958) - Ali
- La Tirana (1958) - Francisco de Goya y Lucientes
- Habanera (1958)
- The Redeemer (1959) - The Good Thief
- Carta al cielo (1959)
- Solomon and Sheba (1959) - (uncredited)
- Tommy the Toreador (1959) - Parilla, the Bullfighter
- The Boy Who Stole a Million (1960) - Miguel
- Julia y el celacanto (1961) - Juan
- El Cid (1961) - (uncredited)
- The Happy Thieves (1961) - Cayetano the Bullfighter (credited as Virgilio Texera)
- Rosa de Lima (1961) - Dimas
- The Balcony of the Moon (1962) - Domingo de Triana
- Face of Terror (1962) - Matt Wilder
- You Have the Eyes of a Deadly Woman (1962)
- Duel at the Rio Grande (1963) - Sacerdote
- Los conquistadores del Pacífico (1963)
- The Fall of the Roman Empire (1964) - Marcellus
- Ella y el miedo (1964) - Esteban Ruiz
- Saul and David (1964) - Abner
- Passagem de Nível (1965) - Eduardo
- Doctor Zhivago (1965) - Captain (uncredited)
- A Voz do Sangue (1966) - João do Souto
- A Man Could Get Killed (1966) - Inspector Rodrigues
- The Sea Pirate (1966) - Decrees
- Return of the Seven (1966) - Luis Emilio Delgado
- Il grande colpo di Surcouf (1966) - Decrees
- The Magnificent Two (1967) - General Carrillo
- Batida de raposas (1976) - Germán
- Cheaters (Tricheurs) (1984) - Toni
- O Crime de Simão Bolandas (1984) - D.Lourenço
- A Mulher do Próximo (1988) - Antonio
- Eternidade (1992) - Álvaro
- Vertigem (1992) - Luís Gouveia
