= CEA Studios =

Film studio

Cinematografía Española Americana S.A.
- Trade name: CEA Studios
- Native name: Estudios CEA
- Company type: Private
- Industry: Film
- Founded: 17 March 1932; 93 years ago
- Defunct: 4 April 1977
- Headquarters: Ciudad Lineal, Madrid, Spain

CEA Studios (Spanish: Estudios CEA), acronym for Cinematografía Española Americana S.A., was a Spanish film studio and production company in Ciudad Lineal, Madrid whose facilities were opened in 1934 and were running until 1966.

The Studio had six sound stages, photographic laboratories for the edition of the films, set construction workshops, dressing rooms for the actors and a rest area with a swimming pool.

At CEA Studios numerous Spanish films were filmed such as Our Lady of Sorrows (1934) by Jean Grémillon and The Violet Seller (1958) by Luis César Amadori, and also large international productions such as The Colossus of Rhodes (1961) by Sergio Leone and Doctor Zhivago (1965) by David Lean.
