= The Song of the Nightingale (1959 film) =

1959 film

- Spanish: Saeta del ruiseñor
- Directed by: Antonio del Amo
- Written by: Concha R. Castaño; Antonio Guzmán Merino; Camilo Murillo; Francisco Naranjo; Concepción Rodríguez Castaño; María Dolores Sánchez Ovín; Antonio del Amo
- Produced by: Cesáreo González; Juan Francisco Blanco Lavín
- Starring: Joselito; Ivy Bless; Archibald L. Lyall
- Narrated by: Antonio García Quijada
- Cinematography: Juan Mariné
- Edited by: Petra de Nieva
- Music by: Miguel García Morcillo; Antonio Valero
- Production companies: Producciones Cinematográficas Argos; Ultra Films
- Distributed by: Suevia Films
- Release date: 16 January 1959
- Running time: 77 minutes
- Country: Spain
- Language: Spanish

The Song of the Nightingale (Spanish: Saeta del ruiseñor) is a 1959 Spanish musical film directed by Antonio del Amo and starring Joselito, Ivy Bless and Archibald L. Lyall.

== Plot ==
Joselito is a boy who lives in a small town in Seville. He has a sister named Carmela whom he woos "El Quico". As the child has a prodigious voice, her sister's boyfriend wants to take advantage of her since he wants to marry her, to which the boy refuses. Finally, meeting a blind girl named Alicia will make Joselito participate in a radio contest to be able to pay for the operation that can restore his vision.

== Cast ==
- Joselito as Joselito
- Ivy Bless as Dorothy
- Archibald L. Lyall as Mr. Richard
- Vicky Lagos as Carmela
- Manuel Zarzo as Quico
- Aníbal Vela as Alcalde
- Lola del Pino as Alicia's mother
- Emma Picó as Joselito's mother
- Luis Moreno as Sr. José
- Félix Briones as Alicia's father
- Manuel Guitián as bailiff
- Carmelo G. Robledo
- Luis Roses as professor
- José María Sánchez Roda
- Mari Carmen Alonso as Alicia
- Antonio Vela as Gordillo
