= Sigfrido Burmann =

- Born: 11 November 1891; Hannover, German Empire
- Died: 22 July 1980 (aged 88); Madrid, Spain
- Other name: Siegfried Burmann
- Occupation: Art director
- Years active: 1938–1974 (film)

Sigfrido Burmann or Siegfried Burmann (1891–1980) was a German-born Spanish art director. He was the father of Wolfgang Burmann, who also became an art director.

== Selected filmography ==
- White Mission (1946)
- A New Play (1946)
- Confidences (1948)
- Ninety Minutes (1949)
- Jalisco Sings in Seville (1949)
- Wings of Youth (1949)
- Agustina of Aragon (1950)
- Lola the Coalgirl (1952)
- Father Cigarette (1955)
- Sighs of Triana (1955)
- Don Juan (1956)
- The Legion of Silence (1956)
- The Adventures of Gil Blas (1956)
- Melancholic Autumn (1958)
- Listen To My Song (1959)
- Lovely Memory (1961)
- The Two Little Rascals (1961)
- The Balcony of the Moon (1962)
- The Twin Girls (1963)
- Tomy's Secret (1963)

== Bibliography ==
- Mira, Alberto. The Cinema of Spain and Portugal. Wallflower Press, 2005.
