= Joselito (singer) =

Spanish singer & actor (born 1943)

- Born: José Jiménez Fernández; 11 February 1943 (age 83); Beas de Segura (Jaén), Spain
- Occupations: Actor, singer
- Years active: 1950-1972, 2009-2011

José Jiménez Fernández (born 11 February 1943), commonly known as Joselito, is a former child singer and film star in Spain, primarily active during the 1950s and 1960s.

== Career ==
Joselito was born in Beas de Segura (Jaén), northeast Andalucia in Spain. Joselito made his film debut at the age of 13 and began making other films, including The Little Nightingale, The Song of the Nightingale, The Nightingale in the Mountains, Listen To My Song, The Little Colonel, Aventuras de Joselito en América, The Two Little Rascals, Lovely Memory, and The White Horse with Antonio Aguilar. Besides acting, Joselito was a popular child singer with a very distinguished voice having sung such songs as "La Campanera", "Dónde estará mi vida", "Gorrioncillo pecho amarillo", "En un pueblito español", "Clavelitos", "Doce Cascabeles", "Las Golondrinas", "El Pastor", "Granada" and "Ave María". He toured several countries in his youth.

He was out of the public eye until adulthood, when he became a media entrepreneur. In 1991, he was arrested in Spain on charges of drug trafficking, tried, and imprisoned for 3 years. In 2002 La Jaula del Ruiseñor was released, an authorized biography of Joselito's life. There he wrote that jail was the best thing that had ever happened to him and that it had helped him to overcome his drug addiction as well as to give him a different outlook on life.

Upon his release, he has participated in the Spanish version of the Survivor television series, and collaborated on the movie Spanish Movie, and he is currently living in Utiel (Valencia).

== Discography ==
=== Songs ===
(Selective)

- "El ruiseñor"
- "La Campanera"
- "Dónde estará mi vida"
- "Gorrioncillo pecho amarillo"
- "En un pueblito español"
- "Clavelitos"
- "Doce Cascabeles"
- "Las Golondrinas"
- "El Pastor"
- "Granada"
- "Ave María"

== Filmography ==
(Selective)

Year	Title	Original Title	Role	Notes
1958	The Nightingale in the Mountains	El ruiseñor de las cumbres	Joselito	
1959	Listen to My Song	Escucha mi canción	Joselito	
1959	The Song of the Nightingale	Saeta del ruiseñor	Joselito	
1960	The Little Colonel	El pequeño coronel	Joselito Alvear	
1961	The Two Little Rascals	Los dos golfillos		
1961	Lovely Memory	Bello recuerdo	Joselito	
1962	The White Horse	El caballo blanco		
1963	Tomy's Secret	El secreto de Tomy	Tomy	
1965	Pedrito de Andía's New Life	La vida nueva de Pedrito de Andía	Pedrito de Andía	
1966	Joselito vagabundo	El falso heredero	Rene	
1968	Prisionero en la Ciudad			
1969	El Irreal Madrid			
2009	Spanish Movie		Guest role	
2011	Torrente 4			
