= Suevia Films =

Spanish film production company

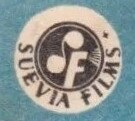
- Industry: Film production and distribution film company
- Founded: 1941
- Founder: Cesáreo González
- Defunct: 1983

Suevia Films was a Spanish film production and distribution company. It was founded in 1941 by entrepreneur Cesáreo González with his brother Arturo Gonzalez. During the 1940s–1960s they were one of Spain biggest studios and were responsible for more than 130 films, averaging five per year.

Beginning in 1951 with the dancer Lola Flores, who was hired for five films at a cost of 6 million pesetas, Suevia signed many of Spain's leading actors to exclusive contracts. These included Francisco Rabal, Fernando Rey, Carmen Sánchez, Ángel de Andrés, Rafael Durán, Antonio Casal, Amparo Rivelles, Conrado San Martín Sara Montiel, Carmen Sevilla, Paquita Rico, Joselito and Marisol. Suevia also participated in many international co-productions which helped them open up the lucrative Latin American market.

Suevia Films ceased film production within six years of Cesáreo González' death in 1968 but continued as distributors until 1983, when they finally closed down for good.

== Production ==
- Polizón a bordo (1940)
- El abanderado (1943)
- El rey de las finanzas (1944)
- Bambú (1945)
- The Emigrant (1946)
- El crimen de Pepe Conde (1946)
- La pródiga (1946)
- Mar abierto (1946)
- La nao Capitana (1947)
- La dama del armiño (1947)
- La fe (1947)
- Reina santa (1947)
- La calle sin sol (1948)
- ¡Olé torero! (1948)
- Mare Nostrum (1948)
- Botón de ancla (1948)
- Una mujer cualquiera (1949)
- Yo no soy la Mata Hari (1950)
- Teatro Apolo (1950)
- La Señora de Fátima (1951)
- La niña de la venta (1951)
- Feather in the Wind (1952)
- Estrella of the Sierra Morena (1952)
- Maldición gitana (1953)
- Gitana tenías que ser (1953)
- El seductor de Granada (1953)
- ¡Ay, pena, penita, pena! (1953)
- El pórtico de la gloria (1953)
- La alegre caravana (1953)
- Nadie lo sabrá (1953)
- ¡Che, qué loco! (1953)
- Siempre Carmen (1953)
- Camelia (1953)
- La bella Otero (1954)
- Morena Clara (1954)
- Los peces rojos (1955)
- La otra vida del capitán Contreras (1955)
- Muerte de un ciclista (1955)
- Historias de la radio (1955).
- La Faraona (1955).
- Limosna de amores (1955).
- Fedra (1956).
- Faustina (1956).
- Calle Mayor (1956)
- El pequeño ruiseñor (1956)
- La guerra empieza en Cuba (1957)
- El ruiseñor de las cumbres (1958)
- La venganza (1958)
- Saeta del ruiseñor (1959)
- Carmen la de Ronda (1959)
- Escucha mi canción (1959)
- Aventuras de Joselito y Pulgarcito (1960)
- Mi último tango (1960)
- El indulto (1961)
- Ha llegado un ángel (1961)
- El balcón de la luna (1962)
- Tierra de todos (1962)
- El caballo blanco (1962)
- La reina del Chantecler (1963)
- Chantaje a un torero (1963)
- La verbena de la Paloma (1963)
- La nueva vida de Pedrito Andía (1965)
- Los pianos mecánicos (1965)
- Amor en el aire (1967)
- Del amor y otras soledades (1969)
- ¡Vivan los novios! (1970)

=== Distribution ===
- Ambitious (1976)
