= Juan Quintero Muñoz =

Spanish composer

Juan Quintero
- Born: Juan Quintero Muñoz; 19 June 1903; Ceuta, Spain
- Died: 26 January 1980 (aged 76); Madrid, Spain
- Occupation: Composer

Juan Quintero Muñoz (19 June 1903 – 26 January 1980) was a Spanish film score composer. At six he started taking lessons in music theory and piano with a private teacher. At nine years old, his family moved to Madrid, where he continued his musical training.

== Film Score works ==
- House of Cards (1943)
- Traces of Light (1943)
- White Mission (1946)
- Madness for Love (1948)
- Mare Nostrum (1948)
- Currito of the Cross (1949)
- The Duchess of Benameji (1949)
- Woman to Woman (1950)
- Tormented Soul (1950)
- The Lioness of Castille (1951)
- A Cuban in Spain (1951)
- Lola the Coalgirl (1952)
- Gloria Mairena (1952)
- Malvaloca (1954)
- An Andalusian Gentleman (1954)
- The Mayor of Zalamea (1954)
- Congress in Seville (1955)
- Melancholic Autumn (1958)
- The Violet Seller (1958)
- Love Madness
- Agustina de Aragón
- Alba de America
- Pequeñeces
- Her, He and His millions
- Heloise beneath an almond tree
- Currito Cross
- Sister San Sulpicio
