= Cifesa =

Spanish film studio

Cifesa is the acronym for Compañía Industrial Film Española, a noted Spanish film studio. They have released such films as Don Quijote de la Mancha (1947), and the 1954 film version of El alcalde de Zalamea, as well as being responsible for the Spanish release of some Hollywood films. Notable stars include Florián Rey, Benito Perojo, Imperio Argentina, and Miguel Ligero. In 1951, the studio released the historical epic Dawn of America, intended as a response to the big-budget British production Christopher Columbus (1949).
