= María Félix filmography =

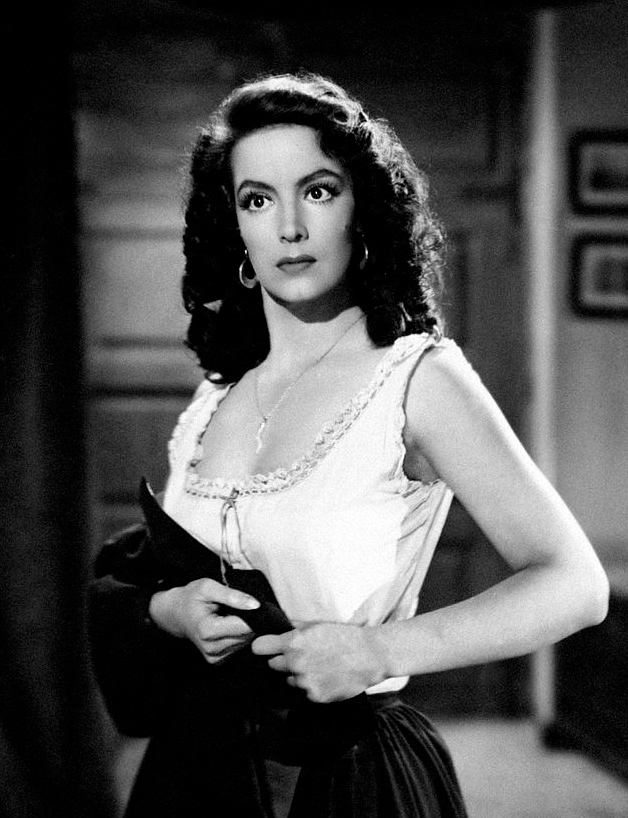
María Félix in The Black Crown (1951)

This is a filmography of María Félix, who began her career in 1942. Her role in the movie Doña Bárbara transformed her into the vamp of 1940s Mexican cinema. After her roles in the Emilio Fernández movies like Enamorada (1946), Río Escondido (1948) and Maclovia (1948), she achieved great fame in Europe.

== Filmography ==
=== 1942–48 (First Mexican period) ===
Year	Title	Role	Director	Other cast members	Notes
1943	El peñón de las ánimas	María Angela Valdivia	Miguel Zacarías	Jorge Negrete	
1943	María Eugenia	María Eugenia	Felipe Gregorio Castillo	Rafael Baledón, Manolita Saval	
1943	Doña Bárbara	Doña Bárbara	Fernando de Fuentes	Julián Soler, María Elena Marqués	
1944	La Mujer sin Alma	Teresa López	Fernando de Fuentes	Fernando Soler	
1944	La China Poblana	Frances Erskine	Fernando Palacios	Tito Novaro, Miguel Inclán	
1944	The Lieutenant Nun	Catalina / Don Alonso	Emilio Gómez Muriel	José Cibrián, Angel Garasa, Consuelo Guerrero de Luna	
1944	Amok	Sra. Travis/Sra. Velmont	Antonio Momplet	Julián Soler, Stella Inda	
1945	The White Monk	Galata Orsina	Julio Bracho	Tomás Perrín, María Douglas	
1945	Vértigo	Mercedes Mallea	Antonio Momplet	Emilio Tuero, Lilia Michel, Emma Roldán	
1946	The Devourer	Diana de Arellano	Fernando de Fuentes	Luis Aldás, Julio Villarreal	
1946	Everybody's Woman	María Romano	Julio Bracho	Armando Calvo, Alberto Galán	
1946	Enamorada	Beatriz Peñafiel	Emilio Fernández	Pedro Armendáriz, Fernando Fernández	
1947	The Kneeling Goddess	Raquel Serrano	Roberto Gavaldón	Arturo de Córdova, Rosario Granados	
1947	Río Escondido	Rosaura Salazar	Emilio Fernández	Fernando Fernández	
1947	Que Dios me perdone	Sofía / Lena Kovach	Tito Davison	Fernando Soler, Julián Soler	
1948	Maclovia	Maclovia	Emilio Fernández	Pedro Armendáriz, Columba Domínguez	

=== 1948–55 (European period) ===
Year	Title	Role	Director	Other cast members	Notes
1948	Mare Nostrum	Freyra	Rafael Gil	Fernando Rey	
1949	Just Any Woman	Nieves Blanco	Rafael Gil	António Vilar, Mary Delgado	
1950	Doña Diabla	Angela "Doña Diabla"	Tito Davison	Víctor Junco, Crox Alvarado	
1950	Saturday Night	Imperia	Rafael Gil	Rafael Duran, Manólo Fábregas	
1951	The Black Crown	María Russell	Luis Saslavsky	Rossano Brazzi, Vittorio Gassman	
1951	Tragic Spell	Oliva	Mario Sequi	Rossano Brazzi, Massimo Serato, Emma Gramatica	
1951	Messalina	Messalina	Carmine Gallone	Georges Marchal, Jean Tissier	
1952	La pasión desnuda	Malva Rey	Luis Cesar Amadori	Carlos Thompson	
1953	Reportaje	Cinema Actress	Emilio Fernández	Jorge Negrete	
1954	Camelia	Camelia	Roberto Gavaldón	Jorge Mistral, Ramón Gay	
1954	El Rapto	Aurora	Emilio Fernández	Jorge Negrete, Andres Soler	
1954	The Beautiful Otero	Carolina, La Belle Otero	Richard Pottier	Jacques Bertier	
1954	French Cancan	Lola de Castro "La Belle Abesse"	Jean Renoir	Jean Gabin, Françoise Arnoul, Édith Piaf	
1955	The Heroes Are Tired	Manuella	Yves Ciampi	Yves Montand, Jean Servais, Curd Jürgens	

=== 1955–70 (Second Mexican period) ===
Year	Title	Role	Director	Other cast members	Notes
1955	La Escondida	Gabriela	Roberto Gavaldón	Pedro Armendáriz, Andres Soler	
1955	Canasta de cuentos mexicanos	Luisa Bravo	Julio Bracho	Pedro Armendáriz, Consuelo Guerrero de Luna, Emma Roldán	(segment "La Tigresa")
1957	Faustina	Faustina	José Luis Sáenz de Heredia	Fernando Fernán Gómez, Fernando Rey	
1957	Tizoc	Maria	Ismael Rodríguez	Pedro Infante, Eduardo Fajardo	
1958	Ash Wednesday	Victoria Rivas	Roberto Gavaldón	Arturo de Córdova, Víctor Junco, Andrea Palma	
1958	Café Colón	Monica	Benito Alazraki	Pedro Armendáriz, Jorge Martínez de Hoyos	
1959	Beyond All Limits	Magdalena Gamboa	Roberto Gavaldón	Jack Palance, Pedro Armendáriz	
1959	Sonatas	Niña Chole	Juan Antonio Bardem	Francisco Rabal, Fernando Rey, Aurora Bautista	
1959	La Cucaracha	"La Cucaracha"	Ismael Rodríguez	Dolores del Río, Emilio Fernández, Pedro Armendáriz	
1959	La fièvre monte à El Pao	Inés Rojas	Luis Buñuel	Gérard Philipe, Jean Servais	
1960	The Empty Star	Olga Lang	Tito Davison	Ignacio López Tarso, Rita Macedo, Carlos López Moctezuma	
1961	Juana Gallo	Juana Gallo	Miguel Zacarías	Jorge Mistral, Christiane Martel	
1963	La Bandida	María, "La Bandida"	Roberto Rodríguez	Pedro Armendáriz, Emilio Fernández, Katy Jurado	
1962	Si yo fuera millonario	María, "La Devoradora"	Julián Soler	Miguel Aceves Mejía	
1963	Amor y sexo (Safo '63)	Diana	Luis Alcoriza	Julio Alemán, Julio Aldama	
1965	La Valentina	Valentina Zúñiga	Rogelio A. González	Eulalio González, José Elías Moreno, Carlos Agostí	
1970	La generala	Mariana Sampedro	Juan Ibáñez	Carlos Bracho, Ignacio López Tarso	(final film role)

=== Short films appearing as herself ===
Year	Title	Notes
1955	El Charro Inmortal	
1979	Mexico de mis amores	
1996	María Félix... una conversación	
1996	La vida de María Félix	
2002	María Félix: La Inalcanzable Doña	

=== Television ===
Year	Title	Role	Director	Other main cast members
1970	La constitución	María Guadalupe	Ernesto Alonso	Carlos Bracho, Carmen Montejo
