= We Thieves Are Honourable =

We Thieves Are Honourable (Spanish:Los ladrones somos gente honrada) may refer to:

- We Thieves Are Honourable (play), a play by Enrique Jardiel Poncela
- We Thieves Are Honourable (1942 film), a Spanish film directed by Ignacio F. Iquino
- We Thieves Are Honourable (1956 film), a Spanish remake directed by Pedro Luis Ramírez
