= The Phantom and Dona Juanita =

- Directed by: Rafael Gil
- Written by: José María Pemán (novel); Rafael Gil
- Starring: Antonio Casal; Mary Delgado; Juan Espantaleón
- Cinematography: Michel Kelber
- Edited by: Juan Serra
- Music by: Juan Quintero
- Production company: CIFESA
- Distributed by: CIFESA
- Release date: 31 March 1945
- Running time: 73 minutes
- Country: Spain
- Language: Spanish

The Phantom and Dona Juanita (Spanish:El fantasma y Doña Juanita) is a 1945 Spanish comedy film directed by Rafael Gil and starring Antonio Casal, Mary Delgado and Juan Espantaleón.

The film's sets were designed by Enrique Alarcón.

== Plot ==
Doña Juanita is a woman who lives haunted by the spirit of a poor clown, with whom she once fell in love and who died when she was saved from certain death by a fire in the circus.

== Cast ==
- Antonio Casal as Tony / José
- Mary Delgado as Juanita / Rosita
- Juan Espantaleón as Pierre Brochard
- Alberto Romea as Don Laureano
- Milagros Leal as Ernestina
- Camino Garrigó as Doña Juanita
- José Isbert as Don Pancho
- Juan Domenech as El cura Don Elpidio
- José Prada as Machuca
- Joaquín Roa as El alcalde
- José Jaspe as Amaru
- Enrique Herreros as El faquir
- Nicolás D. Perchicot as Sacristán
- José Ramón Giner as El fotógrafo
- Julio Infiesta as Gamberro #1
- Fernando Fresno as El bombero
- Emilio Santiago as Hombre en público
- Juana Mansó as Gitana
- Casimiro Hurtado as Director de pista
- Angelita Navalón as Rosario
- Mariana Larrabeiti as Engracia
- José Calle as Empleado del circo
- Manuel París as Socio del casino
- Santiago Rivero as Gamberro #2
- Julia Pachelo as Mujer de don Sixto Olivares
- Manuel Requena as El barbero
- María Cañete as Planchadora
- Luis Rivera as Gamberro #3

== Bibliography ==
- de España, Rafael. Directory of Spanish and Portuguese film-makers and films. Greenwood Press, 1994.
