= The Duchess of Benameji =

The Duchess of Benameji (Spanish:La duquesa de Benamejí) may refer to:

- The Duchess of Benameji (play), a 1932 play by the Spanish writers Antonio and Manuel Machado
- The Duchess of Benameji (film), a 1949 film adaptation directed by Luis Lucia
