= Eloisa Is Under an Almond Tree =

- Directed by: Rafael Gil
- Written by: Enrique Jardiel Poncela (play); Rafael Gil
- Starring: Amparo Rivelles; Rafael Durán; Guadalupe Muñoz Sampedro
- Cinematography: Alfredo Fraile
- Edited by: Sara Ontañón
- Music by: Juan Quintero
- Production company: CIFESA
- Distributed by: CIFESA
- Release date: 21 December 1943
- Running time: 109 minutes
- Country: Spain
- Language: Spanish

Eloisa Is Under an Almond Tree (Spanish: Eloísa está debajo de un almendro) is a 1943 Spanish comedy film directed by Rafael Gil based on a play of Enrique Jardiel Poncela and starring Amparo Rivelles and Rafael Durán and Guadalupe Muñoz Sampedro.

The film's sets were designed by Enrique Alarcón.

== Plot ==
The film tells the story of Fernando (Rafael Durán) who returns home after the death of his father. In a letter he asks her to solve the crime of a woman that occurred years ago. This leads him to come into contact with the strange inhabitants of a peculiar mansion, among whom he discovers the beautiful Mariana (Amparo Rivelles), with whom he falls madly in love.

== Cast ==
- Amparo Rivelles as Mariana
- Rafael Durán as Fernando
- Guadalupe Muñoz Sampedro as Clotilde
- Juan Espantaleón as Edgardo
- Alberto Romea as Ezequiel
- Juan Domenech as Leoncio
- Joaquín Roa as Fermín
- José Prada as Dimas / Luis Perea
- Ana de Siria as Micaela
- Angelita Navalón as Práxedes
- Nicolás D. Perchicot as Presidente del Liceo
- Enrique Herreros as Acomodador del cine
- Mary Delgado as Julia

== Bibliography ==
- España, Rafael de (1994). Directory of Spanish and Portuguese Film-makers and Films (in Spanish). Flicks Books. ISBN 978-0-948911-47-7.
