= María Mayor =

Spanish actor

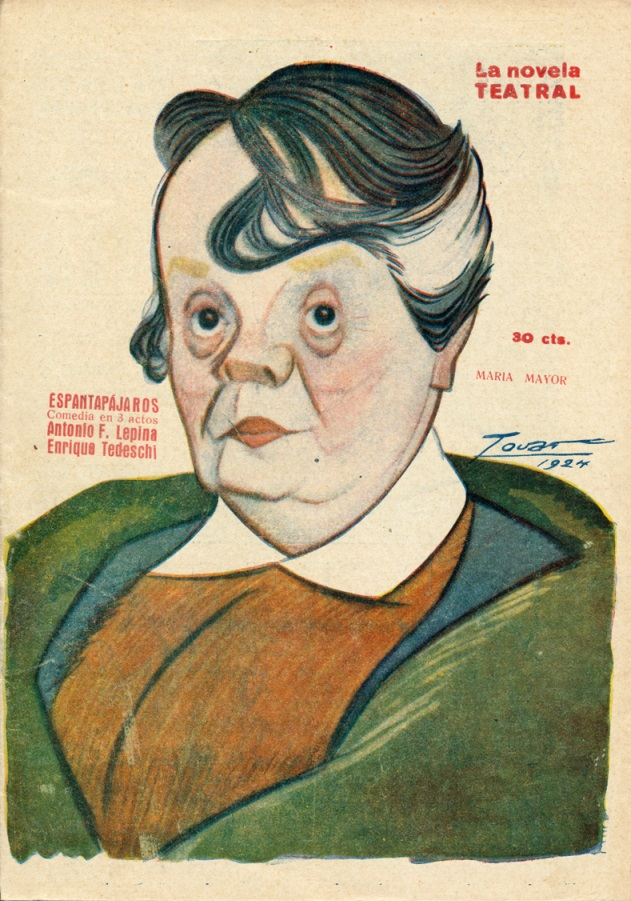
- María Mayor in the comedy Espantapájaros
- Died: February 13, 1939
- Occupation: Stage actress

María Mayor was a Spanish stage actress. She began her career in Madrid at Teatro de la Comedia. She played on Los extremeños se tocan (1925) by Pedro Muñoz Seca, El señor Adrián, el primo (1927) and El solar de mediacapa (1928) both by Carlos Arniches, and Cuatro corazones con freno y marcha atrás by Enrique Jardiel Poncela.

She set up her own company alongside Daniel Dicenta and Juan Espantaleón from 1936. She died days after the end of Spanish Civil War.

== Biography ==
He built his professional career on the stages of Madrid, particularly at the Teatro de la Comedia. Among his successes were Los extremeños se tocan (1925) by Pedro Muñoz Seca, El señor Adrián, el primo (1927) and El solar de mediacapa (1928), both by Carlos Arniches, and Cuatro corazones con freno y marcha atrás by Enrique Jardiel Poncela.

He formed his own company with Daniel Dicenta and, starting in 1936, with Juan Espantaleón.

The actress died a few days after the end of the Spanish Civil War.
