= Ángel de Andrés =

Spanish theatre actor and director (1918–2006)

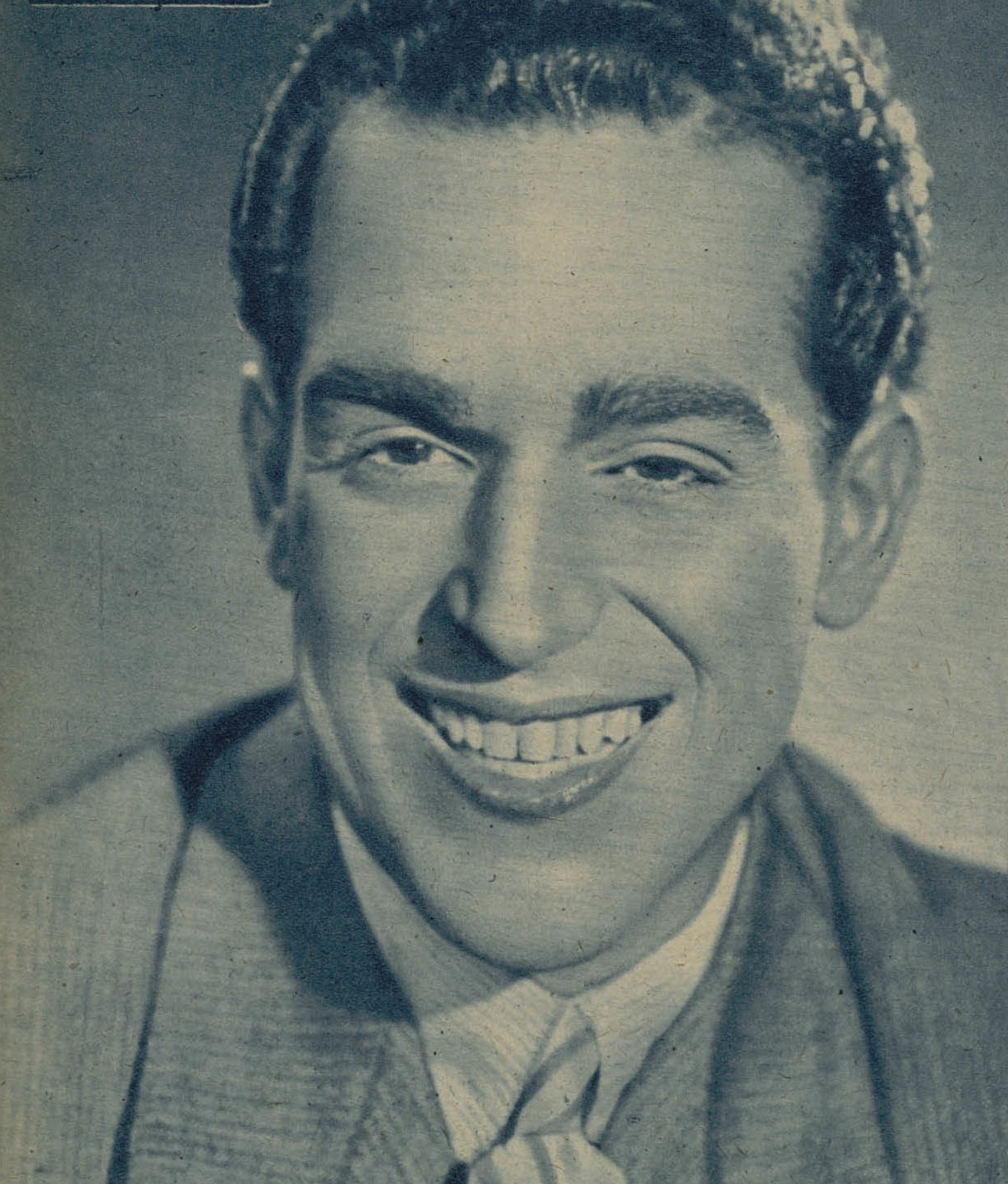
- Born: Ángel de Andrés Miquel; 25 May 1918; Madrid, Spain
- Died: 6 August 2006 (aged 88); Madrid, Spain
- Resting place: Cementerio de la Almudena
- Other name: Angelito de Andrés
- Occupations: Actor, director
- Years active: 1938–1996
- Spouse: Chity Juárez (died 1959)

Ángel de Andrés Miquel was a Spanish theatre actor and director.

== Background ==
In 1938, after the Spanish Civil War broke out, the young Andrés worked as an amateur street actor and then as a "galán cómico" in the Salvador Videgain theatre company. In 1940, he played roles in the Isbert, Infanta Isabel and María Guerrero theatre companies, among others.

Andrés began his own theatre company with Antonio Casal, which became very successful. It was there that Andrés met actress Chity Juárez. Andrés and Juárez married in 1959 and remained together for the rest of Andrés' life. They had two children.

From 1939 until the 1990s, Andrés had regular jobs in theatre, cinema and television. He used his full name as his stage name, however, the people who knew him always called him Angelito de Andrés (Angelito is the familiar form for Ángel).

During the 1940s, Andrés began acting in movies as an extra, but it was not until 1950 that he was first cast serious roles. Throughout his career, Andrés worked by then in Portugal and Mexico. In the 1950s as a presenter and actor in radio and cinema.

Andrés' best performances came after Francisco Franco's death in 1975. In the 1980s, Andrés starred in numerous comedy films, winning the affection as a humorist and also in the TV series Celia and Lorca la muerte de un poeta of Juan Antonio Bardem. In the 1988 he played the character of Zenón de Somodevilla in Josefina Molina film's Esquilache with Fernando Fernán Gómez and Concha Velasco.

After suffering a paralysis due to a thrombus in the 1990s, he retired from the theaters, but not from television screens. In the summer of 2006, Andrés died in his sleep from a heart attack.

== Selected filmography ==
- Fin de curso (1944, by Ignacio F. Iquino) - Gorito
- Turbante blanco (1944) - Duque Gregorio
- Paraíso sin Eva (1944) - Mariano
- Cabeza de hierro (1944) - Polilla
- Thirsty Land (1945)
- Leyenda de feria (1946)
- The Prodigal Woman (1946, by Rafael Gil) - Miguel
- Unknown Path (1946, by José Antonio Nieves Conde) - Peter
- Dulcinea (1947) - Diego Hernández
- The Faith (1947, by Rafael Gil) - Dueño casa huéspedes
- Don Quijote de la Mancha (1947, by Rafael Gil) - Primer Caballero (First Gentleman) (uncredited)
- Confidences (1948, by Jerónimo Mihura) - Luis
- The Sunless Street (1948) - José
- Mare Nostrum (1948) - Toni
- Pototo, Boliche y Compañía (1948)
- Jalisco Sings in Seville (1949, by Fernando de Fuentes)
- Currito de la Cruz (1949) - Empleado de la taberna 'La gallega' (uncredited)
- ¡Fuego! (1949, by Arthur Duarte) - Bombero
- Just Any Woman (1949) - Camionero
- ¡El santuario no se rinde! (1949) - Curro
- Un corazón en el ruedo (1950) - (uncredited)
- Hipólito, el de Santa (1950)
- Tres ladrones en la casa (1950) - Talia
- I Want to Marry You (1951) - Andrés
- Tercio de quites (1951, by Emilio Gómez Muriel) - Angelillo
- Fantasía española (1953, by Javier Setó) - Pepe
- Juzgado permanente (1954) - Carterista
- Historias de la radio (1955, by José Luis Sáenz de Heredia) - Ladrón
- Manolo guardia urbano (1956, by Rafael J. Salvia) - Felipe, el limpiabotas
- Un Abrigo a cuadros (1957, by Alfredo Hurtado) - Germán
- El Hincha (1958, by José María Elorrieta) - Nicolás, el hincha
- Pasa la tuna (1960, by José María Elorrieta) - Tomás González
- 091 Policía al habla (1960, by José María Forqué) - Manolo
- Las Estrellas (1962, by Miguel Lluch) - El Ciruqui
- You and Me Are Three (1962, by Rafael Gil) - Chófer
- La Pandilla de los once (1963, by Pedro Lazaga) - Dick 'EL Chuleta'
- La Batalla del domingo (1963, by Luis Marquina) - Pepe, el limpiabotas
- Tomy's Secret (1963, by Antonio del Amo) - Presentador del concurso
- El espontáneo (1964) - Situado
- Fin de semana. (1964, by Pedro Lazaga) - Fernando
- Dulcinea del Toboso (1964)
- Mi canción es para ti (1965, by Ramón Torrado) - Melitón Pérez Tumbao 'Tumbaito'
- Suena el clarín (1965) - Apoderado
- He's My Man! (1966, by Rafael Gil) - Portero Club Pinky
- El Padre Manolo (1966, by Ramón Torrado) - Roberto, el chófer
- Aquí mando yo (1967, by Rafael Romero Marchent) - Guardia urbano
- Another's Wife (1967, by Rafael Gil) - Taxista
- The Sailor with Golden Fists (1968, by Rafael Gil) - Héctor
- De Picos Pardos a la ciudad (1969, by Ignacio F. Iquino) - Pepe
- Relaciones casi públicas (1969) - Empresario teatral
- ¡Se armó el belén! (1969, by José Luis Sáenz de Heredia) - Comprador y decorador
- Con ella llegó el amor (1970, by Ramón Torrado) - Rafael
- Don Erre que erre (1970, by José Luis Sáenz de Heredia)
- La casa de los Martínez (1971) - Bombero
- Secuestro a la española (1972, by Mateo Cano) - Martín
- Casa Flora (1973, by Ramón Fernández) - Leoncio
- La llamaban La Madrina (1973) - Pardillo timado
- Me has hecho perder el juicio (1973) - Hombre en el metro
- El Reprimido (1974, by Mariano Ozores) - Pepe
- No quiero perder la honra (1975, by Eugenio Martín) - Camacho
- Bienvenido, Mister Krif (1975)
- El último tango en Madrid (1975)
- El mejor regalo (1975) - Taxista
- And in the Third Year, He Rose Again (1980) - Leoncio
- Brujas mágicas (1981, by Mariano Ozores hijo) - Don Lope
- Cristóbal Colón, de oficio... descubridor (1982, by Mariano Ozores hijo) - Fray Juan Pérez
- La canción de los niños (1982) - Andrés
- Una pequeña movida (1983)
- The Autonomines (1983, by Rafael Gil) - Telesforo
- Juana la loca... de vez en cuando (1983, by José Ramón Larraz) - Duque de Medina Sidonia
- El Cid cabreador (1983, by Angelino Fons) - Cardenal
- Libro Luces de bohemia (1985, by Miguel Ángel Díez)
- Esquilache (1989, by Josefina Molina) - Ensenada
- Tahiti's Girl (1990) - Senador Menéndez
- La forja de un rebelde (1990, TV Series, by Mario Camus) - José
- Celia (1993, TV Series, by José Luis Borau) - Don Restituto

== Sources ==
- La auténtica vida e historia del teatro. Juan José Videgain (2005). ISBN 8478281355
- La revista (1997) Ramón Femenía
- Diccionario de Teatro Akal (1997)
- Prensa nacional española entre 1940 y 2005: ABC, El Alcázar, Pueblo, Digame, Ya, El país, El mundo, La razón...
- Teatralerias, tres siglos de la escena, (2018) Madrid: P & V. ISBN 9781724872289
