= The Sunless Street =

1948 film

- Spanish film poster
- Directed by: Rafael Gil
- Written by: Rafael Gil; Miguel Mihura
- Starring: António Vilar; Amparo Rivelles; Manolo Morán; Ángel de Andrés; Mary Delgado
- Cinematography: Alfredo Fraile
- Edited by: Juan Serra
- Music by: Manuel Parada
- Release date: 22 November 1948 (Spain)
- Running time: 95 minutes
- Country: Spain
- Language: Spanish

The Sunless Street (Spanish: La calle sin sol) is a 1948 Spanish drama film written by Miguel Mihura and directed by Rafael Gil.

== Cast ==
- Amparo Rivelles as Pilar
- António Vilar as Mauricio
- Manolo Morán as Manolo
- Alberto Romea as Pedro
- Fernando Fernández de Córdoba
- Ángel de Andrés as José
- Irene Caba Alba as Diana
- Julia Caba Alba as Flora
- Félix Fernández as Basilio
- José Prada as Inspector
- Rufino Inglés
- Juana Mansó as Portera
- Casimiro Hurtado as Camarero
- Santiago Rivero as Camarero
- Chotis
- Mary Delgado as Elvira
- José Nieto as Luis
- Manuel Requena

== Bibliography ==
- Bentley, Bernard P. E. (2008). A Companion to Spanish Cinema. Boydell & Brewer Ltd. ISBN 978-1-85566-176-9.
