= The Prodigal Woman (1946 film) =

1946 film

- Directed by: Rafael Gil
- Written by: Pedro Antonio de Alarcón (novel); Rafael Gil
- Produced by: Cesáreo González; Manuel J. Goyanes
- Starring: Rafael Durán; Paola Barbara; Juan Espantaleón
- Cinematography: Alfredo Fraile
- Edited by: Juan Serra
- Music by: Juan Quintero
- Production company: Suevia Films
- Distributed by: Suevia Films
- Release date: 1946
- Running time: 95 minutes
- Country: Spain
- Language: Spanish

The Prodigal Woman (Spanish: La pródiga) is a 1946 Spanish drama film directed by Rafael Gil and starring Rafael Durán, Paola Barbara and Juan Espantaleón.

== Synopsis ==
Three young candidates for parliament arrive in a town where a bankrupt marchioness is the most influential person. This woman with an adventurous past now lives in near-ruin because she practices charity with the entire town, hence she is known as "the prodigal". A romance blossoms between her and the idealistic Guillermo.

== Cast ==
- Rafael Durán as Guillermo de Loja
- Paola Barbara as Julia Castro Alarcón
- Juan Espantaleón as tío Antonio
- Guillermo Marín as Enrique
- Ángel de Andrés as Miguel
- Fernando Rey as José
- José Prada as Conde de las Acacias
- José María Lado as Cura
- Irene Caba Alba as Francisca
- Mari Carmen Díaz de Mendoza as Brígida
- Maruchi Fresno as María
- Joaquina Almarche as Duquesa de Carmona
- Manuel Arbó as Alcalde
- José Franco as Gordito
- Félix Fernández as Secretario
- Fernando Fresno as Juan
- Alicia Romay as Pura
- Manuel Requena as Elector
- José Jaspe as Conde de Zuera
- José López Rubio as Diputado
- Francisco Rabal

== Bibliography ==
- de España, Rafael. Directory of Spanish and Portuguese film-makers and films. Greenwood Press, 1994.
