= And in the Third Year, He Rose Again =

- Theatrical film poster
- Spanish: Y al tercer año, resucitó
- Directed by: Rafael Gil
- Written by: Fernando Vizcaíno Casas (novel)
- Cinematography: José F. Aguayo
- Edited by: José Luis Matesanz
- Music by: Gregorio García Segura
- Production company: Cinco Films
- Release date: 1 March 1980
- Running time: 90 minutes
- Country: Spain
- Language: Spanish

And in the Third Year, He Rose Again (Spanish: ...y al tercer año, resucitó) (Note: The title is a reference to the Nicene Creed: y, al tercer día, resucitó. ("and the third day he rose again.")) is a 1980 Spanish comedy film directed by Rafael Gil. It is based on a best-selling novel by Fernando Vizcaíno Casas.

== Plot ==
On the morning of 20 November 1978 (20-N), an elderly man in a coat resembling Francisco Franco in his last years hitchhikes from the Valley of the Fallen to Madrid. Around the same time, a radio report on the French franc (Spanish: franco) is misunderstood as saying that dictator Francisco Franco has risen from the dead. The rest of the film are scenes showing how Spanish people react to the rumor amidst the Spanish transition to democracy:

- Communist leader Santiago Carrillo dons a wig again and plans for an exile overseas.
- The Organization of Iberian States (Note: A satire of the autonomous communities of Spain) meets to end up amending the FIFA rules to allow football penalties to be decided democratically by the crowd.
- A festival attended by openly gay men is fled by them.
- Farmers are protesting for the situation of tomato production. They plan to take their protest to the Ministry of Agriculture in Madrid, but nobody will hear them and their cars are seized by the police.
- A union committee try to find a free date for a strike against the infidelity of the wife of one of the unionists with a rightist.
- During the shooting of a pornographic film involving bestiality, the producers renounce their careers.
- An industrialist is driven to a business meeting. Terrorist bombs and holdups happen along the way. On arrival, the company is full of strikers. At the meeting, an absurdist exchange of worthless shares is shown.
- A theater diva rehearses a pro-Communist play. Upon hearing the rumor, she and the director remind their past productions of José María Pemán's plays.
- Socialist leader Felipe González asks for a plane so he can flee to France.
- Two prostitutes rejoice after their work is unionized.
- Prime Minister Adolfo Suárez dismisses the rumor and laments that Franco's expertise would be useful now. He takes out his old Movimiento Nacional uniform.
- In the village of Rebollar de la Mata, the modernist priest and the mayor play cards. An army unit returning from an exercise has to divert into the village. The priest recovers his pre-Council vests and all the villagers welcome the surprised military convoy with old flags.
- A rally at Plaza de Oriente in homage to Franco becomes a massive event. Several of the earlier characters cheer enthusiastically in Francoist paraphernalia. All timidly wait for an appearance of Franco from the balcony of Palacio de Oriente.

Next day, the elderly man is alone in the empty square. At nearby Plaza de España, another elderly man recognizes that the future belongs to the younger and laments that the work of the old generation is not acknowledged anymore. The elderly Franco hitchhikes back to the Valley of the Fallen.

== Cast ==
- José Bódalo as Priest de Rebollar de la Mata
- Mary Begoña as Alicia
- Francisco Cecilio as Film director
- Florinda Chico as prostitute
- Juan Luis Galiardo as motorist
- Antonio Garisa as President of the O.E.I.
- Isabel Luque as Srta. Lilí
- José Nieto as Francisco Franco
- Adrián Ortega as Lope
- Alfonso del Real as Gabriel
- José Sancho as Adolfo Suárez
- Fernando Sancho as Colonel
- Luis Sánchez Polack as Tip
- José Luis Coll as Coll
- Juan Santamaría as Felipe González
- Pedro Valentín as farmers' protest spokesperson
- Ángel de Andrés as Leoncio
- Manuel Alexandre as producer
- Blaki as Fede
- Alberto Fernández as Sr. López
- Pedrín Fernández as Eusebio
- José María Guillén as announcer on TV
- Valentín Gascón as Diego
- Jesús Guzmán as mayor of Rebollar de la Mata
- Rafael Hernández as Eustaquio
- Susana Mayo as La Maña
- Ricardo Palacios as Diego's boss
- Maite Pardo as Faustina
- Emilio Rodríguez as leader of the protesting farmers
- Maite Sancho
- Pedro Sempson as Carlos Arias Navarro
- Manuel Torremocha as Rodolfo
- Luis Varela as Paco

== See also ==
- Look Who's Back (film), a 2015 German film (based on the satirical novel by Timur Vermes) about the resurrection of Adolf Hitler in modern day Germany.
- I’m Back (film), a 2018 Italian film about the resurrection of Benito Mussolini in modern day Italy, based on the German film Look Who’s Back.
