= Alberto Romea =

Spanish actor

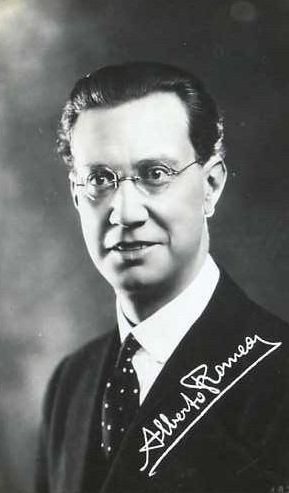
- Alberto Romea in 1925.
- Born: 16 January 1882; Madrid, Spain
- Died: 14 April 1960 (aged 78); Madrid, Spain
- Other name: Alberto Romea Catalina
- Occupation: Actor
- Years active: 1911-1957 (film)

Alberto Romea (16 January 1882 – 14 April 1960) was a Spanish actor. Romea appeared in more than fifty films during his career including Lola, the Coalgirl (1952).

== Selected filmography ==
- El fantasma del castillo (1911)
- Garrotazo y tentetieso (1916)
- Clarita y Peladilla en el Football (1916)
- Donde las dan las toman (1916)
- El beso fatal (1916)
- La dicha ajena (1917)
- De cuarenta para arriba (1918)
- La traviesa molinera (1934) - Magistrate
- La bien pagada (1935) - Don Jorge
- A Woman in Danger (1936) - Dr. Arnal
- The Lady from Trévelez (1936) - Gonzalo de Trévelez
- The Barber of Seville (1938) - Don Basilio
- Carmen (1938) - Comandante Ramírez
- Sighs of Spain (1939) - Freddy Pinto
- Sons of the Night (1939) - Don Francisco Cifuentes y Peláez
- Los cuatro robinsones (1939) - Venancio
- El genio alegre (1939) - Don Eligio, el administrador
- Amore di ussaro (1940) - Conde Don Ramiro
- Yó soy mi rival (1940)
- The Reluctant Hero (1941)
- Un marido barato (1941) - don Gregorio
- Sarasate (1941)
- Éramos siete a la mesa (1942)
- Journey to Nowhere (1942) - Garviza
- A Famous Gentleman (1943) - Don Lorenzo
- Deliciosamente tontos (1943) - Don José
- Forja de almas (1943) - Padre Andrés Manjón
- Eloisa Is Under an Almond Tree (1943) - Ezequiel
- El 13-13 (1944) - Coronel Berkel
- El hombre que las enamora (1944) - Fernando
- The Phantom and Dona Juanita (1945) - Don Laureano
- Thirsty Land (1945) - Párroco
- Bamboo (1945) - Don Jerónimo, el gobernador
- The Emigrant (1946) - Mister Wills
- Mariona Rebull (1947) - Señor Llobet
- Un viaje de novios (1948)
- Extraño amanecer (1948)
- La muralla feliz (1948) - Don Filiberto Aguirre
- La próxima vez que vivamos (1948) - Foresten
- The Sunless Street (1948) - Pedro
- El verdugo (1948)
- The Party Goes On (1948) - Mr. Wines
- La mies es mucha (1949) - Padre Daniel
- Filigrana (1949) - Hermógenes
- His Heart Awake (1949) - Don Tomás
- My Beloved Juan (1950) - Doctor Palacios
- El señor Esteve (1950) - Señor Esteve
- The Lioness of Castille (1951) - Arzobispo
- Dawn of America (1951) - Cardenal Mendoza
- Lola the Coalgirl (1952) - Salazar
- Sobresaliente (1953)
- Welcome Mr. Marshall! (1953) - Don Luis, el caballero
- I Was a Parish Priest (1953) - Administrador
- History of the Radio (1955) - Don Anselmo
- Los jueves, milagro (1957) - Don Ramón (final film role)

== Theatre ==
- El orgullo de Albacete (1902), by Pierre Veber.
- Doña Clarines (1909), by Hermanos Álvarez Quintero.
- No somos nadie (1909), by Carlos Fernández Shaw.
- La losa de los sueños (1911), by Jacinto Benavente.
- Puebla de las Mujeres (1912), by Hermanos Álvarez Quintero.
- La propia estimación (1915), by Jacinto Benavente.
- La campana (1919), by Luis Fernández Ardavín.
- El abuelo (1920), by Benito Pérez Galdós.
- Los chatos (1924), by Pedro Muñoz Seca.
- Canción de cuna (1946), by Gregorio Martínez Sierra.
- Celos del aire (1950), de José López Rubio.

== Bibliography ==
- Mira, Alberto. The Cinema of Spain and Portugal. Wallflower Press, 2005.
