= Luxury Cabin =

1959 film

- Spanish: Camarote de lujo
- Directed by: Rafael Gil
- Written by: Wenceslao Fernández Flórez (novel); Rafael Gil
- Starring: Antonio Casal; María Mahor; Fernando Sancho
- Cinematography: Alfredo Fraile
- Edited by: José Antonio Rojo
- Music by: Cristóbal Halffter
- Production company: Aspa Producciones Cinematográficas
- Distributed by: CEA Distribución
- Release date: 22 June 1959
- Running time: 95 minutes
- Country: Spain
- Language: Spanish

Luxury Cabin (Spanish: Camarote de lujo) is a 1959 Spanish comedy film directed by Rafael Gil and starring Antonio Casal, María Mahor and Fernando Sancho.

== Synopsis ==
A young man leaves his town and goes to the capital, La Coruña, to work with a relative in an emigration shipping company. He soon discovers that the boss extorts the emigrants he sells tickets to and even tries to steal the papers from one of them. But he, who is an honest and sensitive man, cannot consent to such injustice and returns the papers to the emigrant so that he can embark so that he ends up being fired with no money and without finding a job and without telling him or anyone about what happened. His parents or his girlfriend, he makes the decision to embark as a stowaway on a ship that goes to America.

== Cast ==
- Antonio Casal as Aurelio Romay
- María Mahor as Guadalupe
- Fernando Sancho as Ernesto
- José Marco Davó as Don Fabián Mouriz
- Mercedes Muñoz Sampedro as Doña Sofía
- Rafael Bardem as Don Jacinto
- Carmen Esbrí as Vedette
- Erasmo Pascual as Aurelio's father
- Carmen Rodríguez as Aurelio's mother
- Juan Vázquez as Don Manuel
- Nelly Morelli as Elvira
- Guillermo Hidalgo as official
- Adela Carboné as Maria's aunt
- Celia Foster as María
- Ángel Álvarez as godfather
- Isabel Pallarés as godmother
- Eumedre as Juan Cadaval
- Manolo Morán as Don Armando
- Julia Caba Alba as dizzy woman
- Pilar Gómez Ferrer as lady on the train
- Manuel Requena as Don Vicente
