= The Faith (1947 film) =

- Directed by: Rafael Gil
- Written by: Rafael Gil; Armando Palacio Valdés (novel); Antonio Abad Ojuel
- Produced by: José Manuel Goyanes
- Starring: Amparo Rivelles; Rafael Durán; Guillermo Marín
- Cinematography: Alfredo Fraile
- Edited by: Sara Ontañón
- Music by: Manuel Parada
- Production company: Suevia Films
- Release date: 22 October 1947
- Running time: 102 minutes
- Country: Spain
- Language: Spanish

The Faith (Spanish: La fe) is a 1947 Spanish drama film directed by Rafael Gil and starring Amparo Rivelles, Rafael Durán and Guillermo Marín.

The film's art direction was by Enrique Alarcón.

== Cast ==
- Amparo Rivelles as Marta Osuna
- Rafael Durán as Padre Luis Lastra
- Guillermo Marín as Don Álvaro Montesinos
- Juan Espantaleón as Padre Miguel Vigil Suárez
- Ricardo Calvo as Obispo
- Fernando Fernández de Córdoba as Sr. Osuna
- Camino Garrigó as Josefa
- José Prada as Don Martín
- Joaquín Roa as Sacerdote acompañante del P. Miguel
- Félix Fernández as Pelegrín
- Ángel de Andrés as Dueño casa huéspedes
- Carmen Sánchez as Doña Eloísa
- Irene Caba Alba as Dueña casa huéspedes
- Juan Vázquez as Don Gaspar
- Arturo Marín as Ramiro
- Manuel Guitián as Juan
- Julia Lajos as Teodora
- Fernando Aguirre as Maestro
- Cándida Losada as Joaquina
- Ángel Martinez
- Luisa Sala

== Bibliography ==
- Bentley, Bernard P. E. (2008). A Companion to Spanish Cinema. Boydell & Brewer Ltd. ISBN 978-1-85566-176-9.
