= Our Lady of Fatima (film) =

1951 film

- Directed by: Rafael Gil
- Written by: Vicente Escrivá
- Starring: Ines Orsini; Fernando Rey; Tito Junco
- Cinematography: Michel Kelber
- Edited by: José Antonio Rojo
- Music by: Ernesto Halffter
- Production company: Aspa Films
- Distributed by: Suevia Films
- Release date: 7 October 1951
- Running time: 90 minutes
- Country: Spain
- Language: Spanish

Our Lady of Fatima (Spanish: La señora de Fátima) is a 1951 Spanish drama film directed by Rafael Gil and starring Ines Orsini, Fernando Rey and Tito Junco.

== Plot ==
The story of the 1917 miracle of Fatima, in which the Virgin Mary appeared to three children—two girs and one boy.

== Cast ==
- Ines Orsini as Lucía Abóbora
- Fernando Rey as Lorenzo Duarte
- Tito Junco as Oliveira
- José María Lado as Antonio Abóbora
- María Dulce as Jacinta
- Eugenio Domingo as Francisco
- Antonia Plana as María Rosa
- Julia Caba Alba as Olimpia
- Félix Fernández as Marto
- Rafael Bardem as Padre Manuel
- Fernando Sancho as Comunista 1
- Juan Espantaleón as Governor
- Mario Berriatúa as Manuel
- Antonio Riquelme as Carballo
- Milagros Leal
- Erico Braga
- Camino Garrigó
- Julia Delgado Caro
- Francisco Bernal
- Adriano Domínguez
- Ramón Elías
- Salvador Soler Marí
- Adela Carboné
- Matilde Muñoz Sampedro as Andrea
- Concha López Silva
- Dolores Bremón
- María Rosa Salgado as Helena
- José Nieto as Pilgrim
- Pepito Maturana as Child
- José Prada
- Luis Pérez de León
- Ángel Álvarez

== Bibliography ==
- Bentley, Bernard. A Companion to Spanish Cinema. Boydell & Brewer 2008.
