= Golden Woman (disambiguation) =

Golden Woman is a legendary idol of Siberian peoples

Golden Woman may also refer to:

- Gëlle Fra, a nickname of the war memorial in Luxembourg
- La mujer dorada, a Mexican TV soap opera
- An alias of the Golden Girl of Marvel Comics
- The Golden Woman, a 1913 adventure novel by Ridgwell Cullum
- ru:Золотая баба (фильм), a 1987 Russian film based on the legend about the Golden Woman
