= Thirsty Land =

1945 film

- Directed by: Rafael Gil
- Written by: José Fernández Gómez; Rafael Gil; Eduardo Marquina
- Cinematography: Alfredo Fraile
- Music by: Juan Quintero
- Production company: Goya Producciones Cinematográficas
- Release date: 8 October 1945
- Running time: 94 minutes
- Country: Spain
- Language: Spanish

Thirsty Land (Spanish:Tierra sedienta) is a 1945 Spanish drama film directed by Rafael Gil.

The film's sets were designed by Pierre Schild.

== Cast ==
- Irene Caba Alba
- Ana María Campoy
- Ángel de Andrés
- Mary Delgado
- Juan Domenech
- Félix Fernández
- Casimiro Hurtado
- José Jaspe
- José María Lado
- Luis Martínez
- Manuel París
- Nicolás D. Perchicot
- Julio Peña
- José Portes
- José Prada
- Jacinto Quincoces
- Fernando Rey
- Santiago Rivero
- Joaquín Roa
- Alberto Romea

== Bibliography ==
- de España, Rafael. Directory of Spanish and Portuguese film-makers and films. Greenwood Press, 1994.
