= The Song of Sister Maria =

1952 film

- Directed by: Rafael Gil
- Written by: Vicente Escrivá; Ramón D. Faraldo
- Starring: Dominique Blanchar; Francisco Rabal; María Dulce
- Cinematography: Alfredo Fraile
- Edited by: José Antonio Rojo
- Music by: Juan Quintero
- Production company: Aspa Producciones Cinematográficas
- Distributed by: Mercurio Films
- Release date: 10 November 1952
- Running time: 85 minutes
- Country: Spain
- Language: Spanish

The Song of Sister Maria (Spanish: Sor intrépida) is a 1952 Spanish drama film directed by Rafael Gil and starring Dominique Blanchar, Francisco Rabal and María Dulce. It is also known by the alternative title Path to the Kingdom.

== Synopsis ==
Soledad is a famous singer who one day decides to enter a convent, renaming herself Sor María de la Asunción. This decision provokes the confusion of her family, the press and public opinion in general. Now her job is to care for the sick and collect funds to solve the serious economic problems of the order. Finally, she decides to go as a missionary to India to offer her help.

== Cast ==
- Dominique Blanchar as Sor María de la Asunción
- Francisco Rabal as Tomás
- María Dulce as Sor Inés
- Julia Caba Alba as Tía Emilia
- Margarita Robles as Sor Lucía
- José Isbert as Don Cosme
- Eugenio Domingo as Juan
- Carmen Rodríguez as Superiora
- Antonio Riquelme as Horacio
- Fernando Sancho as Mr. Evans
- Félix Fernández as Padre José
- Rosario García Ortega as Actriz
- Rafael Bardem as Director del banco
- Camino Garrigó as Hermana portera
- Ramón Elías as Rigoberto
- María Isbert as Secretaria de banco
- María Francés as Madre Teresa
- José Prada as Doctor
- Manuel Kayser as Canceroso
- Nani Fernández as Miriam
- José Nieto as Manuel
- María Cuevas as Madre Ángeles
- Ramón D. Faraldo as Indio herido
- Concha López Silva as Hermana cocinera
- Matilde Muñoz Sampedro as Superiora del Vicariato
- Elisa Méndez as Madre de Sor María

== Bibliography ==
- Bentley, Bernard. A Companion to Spanish Cinema. Boydell & Brewer 2008.
