= Mary Delgado =

Spanish actress

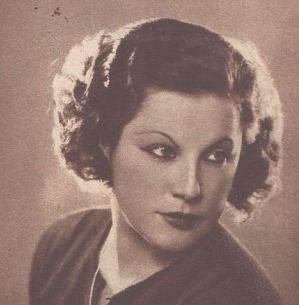
Mary Delgado

Mary Delgado (8 October 1916 – 13 April 1984) was a Spanish actress. She worked with director Rafael Gil on Light Footprint (1941) and with Antonio Casal on Heloise Beneath an Almond Tree (1943), The Ghost and Mrs. Juanita (1945) and Thirsty Land (1945).

== Selected filmography ==
- Eloisa Is Under an Almond Tree (1943)
- Thirsty Land (1945)
- The Phantom and Dona Juanita (1945)
- The Sunless Street (1948)
- Just Any Woman (1949)
- His Heart Awake (1949)
- The Great Galeoto (1951)

== External ==
Mary Delgado at IMDb
