= We Thieves Are Honourable (1956 film) =

1956 film

- Directed by: Pedro Luis Ramirez
- Written by: Enrique Jardiel Poncela (play); Vicente Coello; Vicente Escrivá
- Starring: José Luis Ozores; José Isbert; Encarna Fuentes; Rafael Bardem
- Cinematography: Federico G. Larraya
- Edited by: José Antonio Rojo
- Music by: Federico Contreras
- Production company: Aspa Producciones Cinematográficas
- Distributed by: As Films
- Release date: 3 September 1956
- Running time: 89 minutes
- Country: Spain
- Language: Spanish

We Thieves Are Honourable (Spanish: Los Ladrones Somos Gente Honrada) is a 1956 Spanish comedy film directed by Pedro Luis Ramirez and starring José Luis Ozores, José Isbert and Encarna Fuentes. The film was based on the 1941 play of the same title by Enrique Jardiel Poncela which had previously been adapted into a 1942 film.

== Plot ==
Arévalo's wealthy family is going to celebrate a party at his house. This event reaches the ears of a gang of thieves who are going to take advantage of the occasion to prepare a good hit. Everything has been carefully planned and nothing can go wrong. But something unexpected happens: The gang leader falls in love with the daughter of the owners of the house and the robbery becomes extremely complicated.

== Cast ==
- José Luis Ozores as El Castelar
- José Isbert as El Tío del Gabán
- Encarna Fuentes as Herminia
- Rafael Bardem as Don Felipe Arévalo
- Julia Caba Alba as Eulalia
- Carlos Miguel Solá as Daniel 'El Melancólico'
- José Manuel Martín as Antón, el mayordomo
- José Ramón Giner as Dr. Ramiro Laredo
- Isabel Pallarés as Teresa, la nueva ama de llaves
- Antonio Ozores as Menéndez
- Nora Samsó as Doña Andrea
- Pilar Gómez Ferrer as Monchi, la esposa del Dr. Laredo
- Joaquín Roa as Vigilante
- María Isbert as Berta
- Emilio Santiago as El Titi
- Juana Ginzo as Criada del Rastro
- Julio Goróstegui
- Manuel Aguilera as Benito Ortega
- Jacinto San Emeterio as Empleado de la joyería
- Juan Cazalilla as Otro empleado
- Ángel Álvarez as Farmacéutico
- Milagros Leal as Mujer de Benito
- Alicia Palacios as Germana, la hermana de Don Felipe
- Antonio Garisa as El Pelirrojo
- José María Rodríguez as Sacristán
- Antonio Molino Rojo as Invitado de la fiesta

== Bibliography ==
- Bentley, Bernard. A Companion to Spanish Cinema. Boydell & Brewer, 2008.
