= An Andalusian Gentleman =

- Directed by: Luis Lucia
- Written by: Jesús María de Arozamena; José Luis Colina; Luis Lucia
- Produced by: Benito Perojo
- Starring: Jorge Mistral; Carmen Sevilla; Manuel Luna
- Cinematography: Antonio L. Ballesteros; Cecilio Paniagua
- Edited by: José Antonio Rojo
- Music by: Juan Quintero
- Production company: Producciones Benito Perojo
- Distributed by: CIFESA
- Release date: 8 October 1954
- Running time: 90 minutes
- Country: Spain
- Language: Spanish

An Andalusian Gentleman (Spanish:Un caballero andaluz) is a 1954 Spanish musical film directed by Luis Lucia and starring Jorge Mistral, Carmen Sevilla and Manuel Luna.

The film's sets were designed by the art directors Gil Parrondo and Luis Pérez Espinosa.

== Synopsis ==
A former bullfighter, desolated after the dead of his son, finds a little hope in Esperanza, a young gypsy girl that earns money hardly for her family.

When he realizes that Esperanza is blind and that the gypsies are never educated, he decides to build a school.

There are six songs in the film.

== Cast ==
- Jorge Mistral as Juan Manuel de Almodóvar
- Carmen Sevilla as Esperanza 'Colorín'
- Manuel Luna as Don Elías, el párroco
- Julia Caba Alba as Dolores
- José Isbert as Joaquín
- Casimiro Hurtado as Curro
- Bobby Deglané as Locutor de radio (voice)
- José Prada as Agregado militar
- Irene Caba Alba as Señora Acacia
- Jaime Blanch as José Luis de Almodóvar
- Valeriano Andrés as Doctor
- Francisco Bernal as Espectador en la plaza
- Ricardo Blasco as Espectador en la plaza
- Rafael Cortés as Oculista
- José Luis López Vázquez
- Antonio Ozores as Espectador en la plaza
- Francisco Pierrá as Empresario

== Bibliography ==
- Mira, Alberto. The A to Z of Spanish Cinema. Rowman & Littlefield, 2010.
