= Rafael Durán (actor) =

Spanish actor (1911–1994)

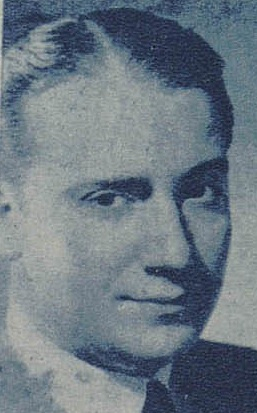
- Born: Rafael Durán Espayaldo; 15 December 1911; Madrid, Spain
- Died: 12 February 1994 (aged 82); Sevilla, Spain
- Occupation: Actor

Rafael Durán Espayaldo (15 December 1911, Madrid – 12 February 1994, Sevilla) was a Spanish actor.

== Biography ==
After leaving his studies of civil engineer, he started on show business, first as dancer, later on theatre. His film debut is in 1935 in Rosario la cortijera, although he became popular with the comedy La tonta del bote, in 1939, costarred with Josita Hernán. The success of this film make Durán- Hernán as a film couple in another six films.

With Alfredo Mayo, he was the star of the Cinema of Spain in the 1940s. He appears in classics as Eloísa está debajo de un almendro (1943); El clavo (1944), both directed by Rafel Gil and both co-starred by Amparo Rivelles; Tuvo la culpa Adán (1944) and Él, ella y sus millones (1944), both by Juan de Orduña; El destino se disculpa (1945), directed by José Luis Sáenz de Heredia or La vida en un hilo (1945), by Edgar Neville, with Conchita Montes.

In the '50s start the decline of his popularity. He retires from screen in 1965. He acted in Jeromín (1953), Un ángel tuvo la culpa (1959) or El Valle de las espadas (1962). Her daughter María Durán, member of the musical trio Acuario, was on the show business for a while.

In 1946 he won Círculo de Escritores Cinematográficos Award as Best Actor for La pródiga.

== Selected filmography ==
- The Complete Idiot (1939)
- Eloisa Is Under an Almond Tree (1943)
- The Nail (1944)
- The Prodigal Woman (1946)
- The Faith (1947)
- Three Mirrors (1947)
- The Captain from Loyola (1949)
- Peace (1949)
- Saturday Night (1950)
- The Great Galeoto (1951)
- The Seventh Page (1951)
- A Passenger Disappeared (1953)
- Jeromin (1953)
- We're All Necessary (1956)
- Fountain of Trevi (1960)
- A Girl from Chicago (1960)
- The Football Lottery (1960)
- Currito of the Cross (1965)
- Pedrito de Andía's New Life (1965)
