= He's My Man! =

- Directed by: Rafael Gil
- Written by: Carlos Arniches (play); José López Rubio; Rafael Gil
- Starring: José Luis López Vázquez; Soledad Miranda; Mercedes Vecino
- Cinematography: José F. Aguayo
- Edited by: Antonio Ramírez de Loaysa
- Music by: Gregorio García Segura
- Production company: Coral Producciones Cinematográficas
- Distributed by: Paramount Films de España
- Release date: 26 March 1966
- Running time: 93 minutes
- Country: Spain
- Language: Spanish

He's My Man! (Spanish:¡Es mi hombre!) is a 1966 Spanish comedy film directed by Rafael Gil and starring José Luis López Vázquez, Soledad Miranda and Mercedes Vecino.

== Cast ==
- José Luis López Vázquez as Antonio Jiménez
- Soledad Miranda as Leonor Jiménez
- Mercedes Vecino as Sole
- Rafael Alonso as Mariano
- Sancho Gracia as Jefe banda Sing-Sing
- José Marco Davó as D. Felipe
- Rafaela Aparicio as Señora Calixta
- Ángel de Andrés as Portero Club Pinky
- Alfonso del Real as Don Paco Maluenda
- Julia Caba Alba as Sra. de D. Felipe
- Roberto Camardiel as Don Tarsio
- Fred Galiana as Bestia
- Los Shakers as Conjunto musical

== Bibliography ==
- Bentley, Bernard. A Companion to Spanish Cinema. Boydell & Brewer 2008.
