= Ricardo Palacios =

Spanish actor, film director and screenwriter (1940–2015)

- Born: Ricardo López-Nuño Díez; 2 March 1940; Reinosa (Cantabria), Spain
- Died: 11 February 2015 (aged 74); Madrid, Spain
- Occupation: Actor

Ricardo López-Nuño Díez (2 March 1940 – 11 February 2015), better known as Ricardo Palacios, was a Spanish actor, film director and screenwriter.

Born in Reinosa (Cantabria), Palacios graduated from the Official Film School in Madrid as an actor and director. He debuted in the 1961 TV series Poly.

He participated in about 150 films and television series, being mainly active in the Spaghetti Western genre, and he was also a recurring presence in films directed by Jesús Franco.

Palacios made his directorial debut with Mi conejo es el mejor, erotic film starring Lina Romay and Emilio Linder. Subsequently, in 1987 Palacios directed ¡Biba la banda! starring Alfredo Landa, and in 1997 he directed the TV-series La banda de Pérez.

After spending over a month in hospital with heart problems, Ricardo died on 11 February 2015 of heart failure.

== Filmography ==
- Poly (1961, TV Series) - Paolo (1972)
- Tengo 17 años (1964) - Cleo
- Flor salvaje (1965, de Javier Setó) - Agustín
- Diálogos de la paz (1965) - Fotógrafo
- For a Few Dollars More (1965, de Sergio Leone) - Tucumcari Saloon Keeper (uncredited)
- Doctor Zhivago (1965) - Minor Role (uncredited)
- Los oficios de Cándido (1965) - Asistente del árabe
- Cartas boca arriba (1966, de Jesús Franco) - Hermes
- Historias para no dormir (1966, TV Series)
- A Funny Thing Happened on the Way to the Forum (1966) - Marcus Lycus's Eunuch (uncredited)
- Return of the Seven (1966, de Burt Kennedy) - Jailer
- The Ugly Ones (1966, de Eugenio Martín) - Waystation Attendant
- The Good, the Bad and the Ugly (1966, de Sergio Leone) - Bartender in Socorro (uncredited)
- Los diablos rojos (1966)
- Huyendo del halcón (1966)
- Historia de la frivolidad (1967, TV Movie) - Fan 2
- Dynamite Joe (1967, de Antonio Margheriti) - El Sol
- Up the MacGregors! (1967) - Bandit
- Frontera al sur (1967)
- The Desperate Ones (1967)
- Los siete de Pancho Villa (1967, de José María Elorrieta) - Pancho Villa
- Cervantes (1967, de Vincent Sherman) - Sancho
- 15 Scaffolds for a Murderer (1967) - Juan
- Day of Anger (1967, de Tonino Valerii) - Bowie Cantina Owner (uncredited)
- Rumbo a Belén (1967)
- Ragan (1968) - Flower
- The Blood of Fu Manchu (1968, de Jesús Franco) - Sancho Lopez
- Run, Man, Run (1968) - Mexican Officer with Dynamite (uncredited)
- La esclava del paraíso (1968) - Mamet
- Once Upon a Time in the West (1968, de Sergio Leone) - Morton's Train Conductor (uncredited)
- Battle of the Last Panzer (1969)
- No disponible (1969)
- Cry Chicago (1969) - Charlie Romero
- El perfil de Satanás (1969) - Lyne
- El cóndor (1970, de John Guillermin) - Chief Bandit
- Las secretas intenciones (1970) - Hombre en centro comercial
- El sobre verde (1971) - Carromoto
- Black Beauty (1971, de James Hill) - Russian General
- The Horsemen (1971) - Ghulam (uncredited)
- Capitán Apache (1971, de Alexander Singer) - Sergeant
- La Araucana (1971, de Julio Coll)
- Red Sun (1971) - Pogo (uncredited)
- Bad Man's River (1971, de Eugenio Martín) - Mexican Soldier
- Delusions of Grandeur (1971) - Le cuisinier (uncredited)
- Nothing Less Than a Real Man (1972, de Rafael Gil)
- What the Peeper Saw (1972, de Andrea Bianchi)
- Los fabulosos de Trinidad (1972, de Ignacio F. Iquino) - Ray
- Ninguno de los tres se llamaba Trinidad, de Pedro Luis Ramírez (1973) - Ray
- The Man Called Noon (1973, de Peter Collinson) - Brakeman
- El kárate, el colt y el impostor (1974, de Antonio Margheriti) - Calico (uncredited)
- The Spikes Gang (1974, de Richard Fleischer) - Doctor
- Pasqualino Cammarata, Frigate Captain (1974)
- Il mio nome è Scopone e faccio sempre cappotto (1974) - Rompemanos
- Dick Turpin (1974, de Fernando Merino) - Moscarda
- The Wind and the Lion (1975) - Torres (uncredited)
- Valley of the Dancing Widows (1975) - Coach Wagon Driver (uncredited)
- La llamada del lobo (1975, de Gianfranco Baldanello) - Joe - Barkeeper
- Take a Hard Ride (1975, de Antonio Margheriti) - Calvera
- What Changed Charley Farthing? (1975) - Greek Captain
- Soldier of Fortune (1976) - (uncredited)
- A la legión le gustan las mujeres... y a las mujeres, les gusta la legión (1976, de Rafael Gil) - El Pemán
- Último deseo (1976, de León Klimovsky) - Dr. Robertson
- Volvoreta (1976) - Portugués
- Más allá del deseo (1976) - Patrón
- Viaje al centro de la Tierra (1976, de Juan Piquer Simón) - Train ticket collector
- Uno del millón de muertos (1977)
- Chely (1977)
- La perla negra (1977) - Merchant
- Del amor y de la muerte (1977)
- Nido de viudas (1977)
- Estimado Sr. juez... (1978) - Gabriel Sánchez Morales
- Der Tiefstapler (1978) - Verkehrsminister
- Fantasma en el Oeste (1978) - Capo messicano
- Seven Days in January (1979) - (uncredited)
- Zwei tolle Käfer räumen auf (1979) - Capitano
- Aventuras de Pinín y sus amigos (1979) - Capitán Prendes
- Y al tercer año, resucitó (1980, de Rafael Gil) - Jefe de Diego
- Tierra de rastrojos (1980, de Antonio Gonzalo)
- El carnaval de las bestias (1980, de Jacinto Molina) - Don Carmelo, the priest
- Hijos de papá (1980, de Rafael Gil) - Abogado
- Los cántabros (1980, de Jacinto Molina) - Gurco
- Tú estas loco, Briones (1981, de Javier Maqua) - Rodolfo
- El retorno del Hombre-Lobo (1981, de Jacinto Molina) - First graverobber
- Comin' at Ya! (1981) - Polk Thompson
- Car Crash (1981, de Antonio Margheriti) - Eli Wronsky
- Safari erótico (1981)
- Verano azul (1981, TV Series) - Barrilete
- Un pasota con corbata (1982) - Cholo
- Buscando a Perico (1982, de Antonio del Real) - Siniestra
- Freddy, el croupier (1982, de Álvaro Sáenz de Heredia) - El Calvo
- Los blues de la calle Pop (Aventuras de Felipe Malboro, volumen 8) (1983, de Jesús Franco) - Narrador (voice, uncredited)
- En busca del dragón dorado (1983) - Salomón (voice, uncredited)
- Black Venus (1983) - Monsieur Lambert (uncredited)
- USA, violación y venganza (1983, de José Luis Merino) - Theo Mancini
- Y del seguro... líbranos Señor! (1983, de Antonio del Real) - Butragueño
- Las autonosuyas (1983, de Rafael Gil) - Rafa
- Camino solitario (1984, de Jesús Franco) - Raden
- The Ark of the Sun God (1984) - Mohammed
- Leviatán (1984) - Sheriff Morrison
- La de Troya en el Palmar (1984) - El Exquisito
- Café, coca y puro (1985) - D. Antonio
- Juego sucio en Casablanca (1985, de Jesús Franco) - Papa Yul
- Tex and the Lord of the Deep (1985) - Fat Whisky Seller (uncredited)
- El caballero del dragón (1985, de Fernando Colomo)
- Lulú de noche (1986) - Propietario Jazz Bar
- Orgasmo perverso (1986)
- Sola ante el terror (1986, de Jesús Franco)
- Sida, la peste del siglo XX (1986)
- Clase media (1987, TV Series) - Agapito
- Crystalstone (1987) - Fruit Vendor
- Cómicos (1987, TV Series)
- ¡Biba la banda! (1987, de Ricardo Palacios)
- El pecador impecable (1987, de Augusto Martínez Torres) - Anibal
- El Lute: camina o revienta (1987, de Vicente Aranda) - Empleador
- Esa cosa con plumas (1988, de Óscar Ladoire)
- Bajarse al moro (1989, de Fernando Colomo) - Naturista
- The Return of the Musketeers (1989, de Richard Lester) - Big Lackey
- Hot Blood (1989) - Néstor
- Las cosas del querer (1989) - Director del penal
- Eva y Adán, agencia matrimonial (1990, TV Series) - Ambrosio
- El rescate del talismán (1991, TV Series) - Magician (1993-1994)
- Aquí hay negocio (1995, TV Series)
- Un dólar por los muertos (1998, TV Movie) - Bartender - Cantina (uncredited)
- Antivicio (2001, TV Series)
- Héroes de cartón (2001)
- La marcha verde (2002, de José Luis García Sánchez) - Perales (final film role)
