= The Corsican Brothers (1955 film) =

- Directed by: Leo Fleider
- Starring: António Vilar
- Release date: 1955
- Running time: 94 minute
- Country: Argentina
- Language: Spanish

The Corsican Brothers (Spanish: Los Hermanos corsos) is a 1955 Argentine film.

== Cast ==
- António Vilar
