= Enrique Alarcón =

Spanish art director

- Born: Enrique Alarcón Sánchez-Manjavacas; 13 June 1917; Campo de Criptana (Ciudad Real), Spain
- Died: 13 June 1995 (aged 78); Madrid, Spain
- Occupation: Art director
- Years active: 1943-1985 (film)

Enrique Alarcón Sánchez-Manjavacas (1917–1995) was a Spanish film art director and set decorator. He worked on over two hundred films, mostly Spanish, but also in foreign films shot in Spain, such as King of Kings (1961).

Alarcón received the Honorary Goya Award presented by the Spanish Film Academy in 1991.

== Selected filmography ==
- Eloisa Is Under an Almond Tree (1943)
- Fantastic Night (1943)
- The Phantom and Dona Juanita (1945)
- Lady in Ermine (1947)
- The Faith (1947)
- Saturday Night (1950)
- The Girl at the Inn (1951)
- From Madrid to Heaven (1952)
- Estrella of the Sierra Morena (1952)
- Feather in the Wind (1952)
- It Happened in Seville (1955)
- The Lost City (1955)
- Congress in Seville (1955)
- The Sun Comes Out Every Day (1958)
- The Violet Seller (1958)
- The Nightingale in the Mountains (1958)
- A Girl Against Napoleon (1959)
- Alfonso XII and María Cristina (1960)
- Heaven at Home (1960)
- King of Kings (1961)
- The Fair of the Dove (1963)
- Samba (1965)
- The Lost Woman (1966)
- Road to Rocío (1966)
- The Hunting Party (1971)

== Bibliography ==
- Sally Faulkner. A Cinema of Contradiction: Spanish Film in the 1960s. Edinburgh University Press, 2006.
- Fernando Diéguez Rodríguez-Montero (2008). "Enrique Alarcón: testigo de nuestra historia, artífice de nuestro cine". El cine: una mirada interdisciplinar. Vol. 17. pp. 89–117. ISBN 978-84-95964-56-4.
