= Just Any Woman =

1949 film

- Directed by: Rafael Gil
- Written by: Rafael Gil; Miguel Mihura
- Produced by: José Manuel Goyanes
- Starring: María Félix; António Vilar; Mary Delgado
- Cinematography: Theodore J. Pahle
- Edited by: José Antonio Rojo
- Music by: Manuel Parada
- Production company: Suevia Films
- Distributed by: Suevia Films
- Release date: 15 August 1949
- Running time: 89 minutes
- Country: Spain
- Language: Spanish

Just Any Woman (Spanish: Una mujer cualquiera) is a 1949 Spanish drama film directed by Rafael Gil and starring María Félix, António Vilar and Mary Delgado.

== Synopsis ==
A woman who is alone tries to get ahead on her own, but precisely her beauty hinders her because all men see her as an instrument of pleasure, and the only way out of her is to "do the street". She then meets Luis, who is going to get her into a big mess, turning her life into a frenetic obstacle course.

== Cast ==
- María Félix as Nieves Blanco
- António Vilar as Luis
- Mary Delgado as Isabel
- Juan Espantaleón as Comisario
- José Nieto as Vecino
- Juan de Landa as Padre de Luis
- Manolo Morán as Taxista
- Eduardo Fajardo as Ricardo
- Fernando Fernández de Córdoba as Doctor
- Ángel de Andrés as Camionero
- Carolina Giménez as Rosa
- Ricardo Acero as Viajero tren
- Julia Caba Alba as Ofelia
- María Isbert as Pasajera tren
- Félix Fernández as Julio
- Rafael Bardem as Diseñador de moda
- José Prada as Policía tren
- Manuel Requena as Sereno
- Manuel Aguilera as Ayudante comisario
- Luis Rivera
- Arturo Marín as Revisor tren
- Manuel San Román
- Francisco Bernal as Manuel
- Tomás Blanco as Marido de Nieves
- Manuel Guitián as Fidel
- Casimiro Hurtado as Mecánico
- Julia Lajos as Tía Pilar
- Santiago Rivero as Ramón
- Emilio Santiago as Recepcionista hotel

== Bibliography ==
- Bentley, Bernard. A Companion to Spanish Cinema. Boydell & Brewer 2008.
