= I Was a Parish Priest =

1953 film by Rafael Gil

- Directed by: Rafael Gil
- Written by: Vicente Escrivá; Ramón D. Faraldo
- Produced by: Manuel J. Goyanes
- Starring: Claude Laydu; Francisco Rabal; José Marco Davó
- Cinematography: Alfredo Fraile
- Edited by: José Antonio Rojo
- Music by: Joaquín Rodrigo
- Production company: Aspa Producciones Cinematográficas
- Distributed by: CIFESA
- Release date: 30 September 1953
- Running time: 96 minutes
- Country: Spain
- Language: Spanish

I Was a Parish Priest or God's War (Spanish: La guerra de Dios) is a 1953 Spanish drama film directed by Rafael Gil and starring Claude Laydu, Francisco Rabal and José Marco Davó. It was awarded the Gran Premio at the first ever San Sebastián International Film Festival. It was also shown at the Venice Film Festival where it was awarded the Bronze Lion.

It portrays the efforts of a young Priest sent to a poor mining village in the early 1930s.

== Synopsis ==
A priest receives as his first assignment the parish of a mining town, beset by poverty. In this area he will focus all his forces to overcome the resentment accumulated by the miners towards the ecclesiastical profession.

== Cast ==
- Claude Laydu as P. Andrés Mendoza
- Francisco Rabal as Martín
- José Marco Davó as Don César
- Fernando Sancho as Barrona
- Gérard Tichy as El Negro
- Alberto Romea
- Carmen Rodríguez
- Ricardo Calvo
- Julia Caba Alba as Hermana de D. César
- Félix Dafauce
- Milagros Leal
- Mariano Azaña as Fermín, el cartero
- José Sepúlveda
- Manuel Kayser
- Arturo Marín
- José Manuel Martín
- José Miguel Rupert
- Félix Briones
- María Eugenia Escrivá as Margarita
- Jaime Blanch as Daniel
- Carlos Acevedo as Niño
- Juan José Vidal as Niño

== Bibliography ==
- Bentley, Bernard P. E. (2008). A Companion to Spanish Cinema. Boydell & Brewer Ltd. ISBN 978-1-85566-176-9.
