= You and Me Are Three =

- Spanish: Tú y yo somos tres
- Directed by: Rafael Gil
- Written by: Rafael García Serrano; Rodolfo M. Taboada; Rafael Gil
- Based on: You and Me Are Three by: Enrique Jardiel Poncela
- Starring: Analía Gadé; Alberto de Mendoza; Pepe Rubio
- Cinematography: Heinrich Gärtner
- Edited by: Antonio Ramírez de Loaysa
- Music by: Carlos Ferrari; Manuel Parada
- Production companies: Coral Producciones Cinematográficas; Internacional Productora de Peliculas Argentinas
- Distributed by: Chamartín
- Release date: 6 September 1962
- Running time: 89 minutes
- Countries: Argentina; Spain
- Language: Spanish

You and Me Are Three (Spanish: Tú y yo somos tres) is a 1962 Argentine-Spanish comedy film directed by Rafael Gil. It is about a woman who falls in love by correspondence with a man who turns out to have a conjoined twin. It is based on a play by Enrique Jardiel Poncela.

== Cast ==
- Analía Gadé as Manolina
- Alberto de Mendoza as Rodolfo Céspedes / Adolfo Céspedes
- Pepe Rubio as Ramiro
- Ismael Merlo as Dr. Alberto Cendreras
- Katia Loritz as Eva
- Matilde Muñoz Sampedro as Manolina's aunt
- José Franco as Raimundo Cisneros's uncle
- Paula Martel as maiden
- José María Tasso as photographer
- Pilarín Casanova
- Venancio Moreno
- Pilar Cano
- Beni Deus
- Laly Soldevila as street girl
- Erasmo Pascual
- Ramón Elías
- José Morales
- Julia Caba Alba as Dominga
- Licia Calderón as Matilde
- José Isbert as President
- Manolo Gómez Bur as Cabo Rebollo
- José Luis López Vázquez as nurse Gómez
- Ángel de Andrés as chauffeur
- Gracita Morales as receptionist at the hospital
