= We Thieves Are Honourable (1942 film) =

1942 film

- Directed by: Ignacio F. Iquino
- Written by: Enrique Jardiel Poncela (play); Ignacio F. Iquino
- Starring: Amparo Rivelles; Matilde Artero; José Jaspe; Angelita Navalón
- Cinematography: Emilio Foriscot
- Edited by: Antonio Cánovas
- Production company: Juca Film
- Distributed by: CIFESA
- Release date: 9 March 1942
- Running time: 102 minutes
- Country: Spain
- Language: Spanish

We Thieves Are Honourable (Spanish: Los ladrones somos gente honrada) is a 1942 Spanish comedy film directed by Ignacio F. Iquino and starring Amparo Rivelles, Matilde Artero and José Jaspe. The film was based on the 1941 play of the same title by Enrique Jardiel Poncela. In 1956 the film was remade.

== Cast ==
In alphabetical order

- Matilde Artero
- Amparo Cervera
- Fernando Freire
- José Jaspe
- Manuel Luna as El Melancólico
- Ramón Martori
- Arturo Morillo
- Angelita Navalón
- Mercè Nicolau
- Antonio Riquelme as El Castelar
- Amparo Rivelles
- José Sanchíz
- Joaquín Torréns
- Mercedes Vecino
- Luis Villasiul

== Bibliography ==
- Bentley, Bernard. A Companion to Spanish Cinema. Boydell & Brewer, 2008.
