= Vicente Escrivá =

Spanish film director

- Born: 1 June 1913; Valencia, Spain
- Died: 18 April 1999 (aged 85); Madrid, Spain
- Occupations: Film director, film producer, screenwriter
- Years active: 1948-1999

Vicente Escrivá (1 June 1913 – 18 April 1999) was a Spanish film director, producer and screenwriter. He worked on more than 50 films between 1948 and 1999.

== Selected filmography ==
- Agustina of Aragon (1950)
- Our Lady of Fatima (1951)
- The Lioness of Castille (1951)
- Reckless (1951)
- From Madrid to Heaven (1952)
- The Song of Sister Maria (1952)
- I Was a Parish Priest. (1953)
- He Died Fifteen Years Ago (1954)
- Judas' Kiss (1954)
- The Cock Crow (1955)
- The Other Life of Captain Contreras (1955)
- The Big Lie (1956)
- Miracle of the White Suit (1956)
- We Thieves Are Honourable (1956)
- Dulcinea (1962)
- Zorrita Martinez (1975)
- Love, Hate and Death (1989)
