= María Isbert =

Spanish actress

The Most Excellent María Isbert
- Born: María Vicenta Ysbert Soriano; 21 April 1917; Madrid, Spain
- Died: 25 April 2011 (aged 94); Villarrobledo (Albacete), Spain
- Occupation: Actress

María Vicenta Ysbert Soriano (21 April 1917 – 25 April 2011) better known as María Isbert was a Spanish actress whose credits included more than 250 Spanish films during her career. Isbert worked with most major Spanish film actors and directors, including Luis García Berlanga and Luis Buñuel. Isbert, whose credits included films, television and theater work, was most active from the 1960s to the 1980s.

Isbert was born in Madrid, Spain, on 21 April 1917. She was the daughter of Pepe Isbert, a popular Spanish film actor whose major roles included Welcome Mr. Marshall!. Maria Isbert was the mother of seven children, including actor Tony Isbert.

Isbert received numerous awards for her work, including the Silver Bellas Artes Medal in 1987. She was also named an Honorary Academic of the Academia de las Artes y las Ciencias Cinematográficas de España in 2008.

Maria Isbert died at the Villarrobledo Hospital in Villarrobledo (Albacete), Spain, on 25 April 2011, at the age of 94. A memorial was held at the Teatro Circo in Albacete.

== Selected filmography ==
- Life Begins at Midnight (1944)
- The Road to Babel (1945)
- The Princess of the Ursines (1947)
- Lola Leaves for the Ports (1947)
- The Party Goes On (1948)
- Just Any Woman (1949)
- Currito of the Cross (1949)
- La trinca del aire (1951)
- Feather in the Wind (1952)
- The Song of Sister Maria (1952)
- We Thieves Are Honourable (1956)
- College Boarding House (1959)
- Queen of The Chantecler (1962)
- A Decent Adultery (1969)
- The Complete Idiot (1970)

== Honors ==
- 2006 – Gold Medal of Merit in Labour (Kingdom of Spain, 1 December 2006).
