= Juan Espantaleón =

Spanish actor

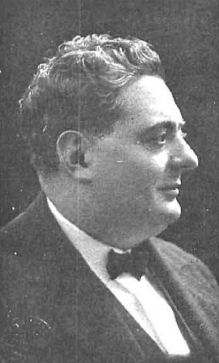
- Born: 12 March 1885; Seville, Andalucía, Spain
- Died: 26 November 1966 (aged 81); Madrid, Spain
- Other name: Juan Espantaleón Torres
- Occupation: Actor
- Years active: 1911–1951 (film)

Juan Espantaleón (12 March 1885 – 26 November 1966) was a Spanish film actor.

== Biography ==
He was born in Seville, the son of Juan Espantaleón Perea and Luisa Torres y Torres. His father died in Madrid on December 26, 1920, at the age of 75. He made his stage debut in 1892 at the age of seven with the Compañía Novedades, where his father was the lead actor and director. From that moment on, he began an uninterrupted theatrical career that took him, successively, through the Martín, Ernesto Vilches, and Irene López Heredia theater companies, until he formed his own.

He made his film debut in 1915 and continued to make sporadic appearances until after the Spanish Civil War, notably starring in Florián Rey Nobleza baturra (1935) during that period.

Once the war was over, he resumed his film career, which was very prolific during the 1940s, with a string of notable titles, almost always comedies directed by Juan de Orduña or Rafael Gil. In these films, he played a lovable, good-natured character type that made him one of the most popular Spanish actors of the time.

== Selected filmography ==
- Currito of the Cross (1926)
- Nobleza baturra (1935)
- Huella de luz (1943)
- Eloisa Is Under an Almond Tree (1943)
- The Nail (1944)
- The Phantom and Dona Juanita (1945)
- White Mission (1946)
- The Prodigal Woman (1946)
- The Holy Queen (1947)
- The Faith (1947)
- The Princess of the Ursines (1947)
- Mare Nostrum (1948)
- Just Any Woman (1949)
- Currito of the Cross (1949)
- Night Arrival (1949)
- Agustina of Aragon (1950)
- Apollo Theatre (1950)
- Saturday Night (1950)
- The Great Galeoto (1951)
- Our Lady of Fatima (1951)

== Bibliography ==
- Luis Mariano González. Fascismo, kitsch y cine histórico español, 1939-1953. Univ de Castilla La Mancha, 2009.
