= Queen of the Chantecler =

1962 film

- Directed by: Rafael Gil
- Written by: Jesús María de Arozamena; Antonio Mas Guindal; José Zamora
- Produced by: Marciano de la Fuente
- Starring: Sara Montiel; Alberto de Mendoza; Luigi Giuliani
- Cinematography: Mario Montuori
- Edited by: Julio Peña
- Music by: Gregorio García Segura
- Production company: Suevia Films
- Distributed by: Suevia Films
- Release date: 25 October 1962
- Running time: 112 minutes
- Country: Spain
- Language: Spanish

Queen of the Chantecler (Spanish: La reina del Chantecler) is a 1962 Spanish historical drama film directed by Rafael Gil and starring Sara Montiel, Alberto de Mendoza and Luigi Giuliani. A Spanish music hall entertainer gets caught up in espionage during the First World War, as she finds true love with a country boy who does not know her true identity.

== Cast ==
- Sara Montiel as La Bella Charito
- Alberto de Mendoza as Federico de la Torre
- Luigi Giuliani as Santi de Acíbar
- Greta Chi as Mata Hari
- Gérard Tichy as Henri Duchel
- Amelia de la Torre as Adelina
- Milagros Leal as Doña Pura
- Julia Caba Alba as Doña Exaltación
- José María Seoane as Conde
- Francisco Piquer as Rafael
- Miguel Ligero as Don Benigno
- Antonio Garisa as Crupier
- Eugenia Roca
- Mary Begoña as La Pepa
- Isabel Pallarés
- María Isbert as Joven mujer carlista
- José Franco as Don Pagaré
- Pedro Osinaga as Iñaki Aguirre
- Fernando Liger
- Óscar San Juan as
- José Orjas as Empresario
- Goyo Lebrero as Empleado del Chantecler
- José Morales
- Rosa Palomar
- Encarna Paso
- Carmen Rodríguez
- Ana Mariscal as Carola, condesa de Valdeluna
- Manolo Gómez Bur as Guardia

== Bibliography ==
- Phil Powrie. Carmen on Film: A Cultural History. Indiana University Press, 2007.
