= Mare Nostrum (1948 film) =

1948 film

- Directed by: Rafael Gil
- Written by: Antonio Abad Ojuel; Rafael Gil
- Based on: Mare Nostrum by Vicente Blasco Ibáñez
- Produced by: Cesáreo González
- Starring: María Félix; Fernando Rey; Guillermo Marín; José Nieto
- Cinematography: Alfredo Fraile
- Edited by: José Antonio Rojo
- Music by: Juan Quintero
- Production companies: Suevia Films; Scalera Film
- Distributed by: Suevia Films (Spain)
- Release date: 21 December 1948
- Running time: 90 minutes
- Countries: Italy; Spain
- Language: Spanish

Mare Nostrum (English: Our Sea) is a 1948 drama film directed by Rafael Gil and starring María Félix, Fernando Rey and Guillermo Marín. The title refers to a Latin phrase for the Mediterranean Sea. A Spanish sailor becomes mixed up with a mysterious foreign spy at the time of the Second World War.

It is an adaptation of the novel of the same name by Vicente Blasco Ibáñez which had previously been turned into a 1926 American silent film.

== Plot ==
German spies, using Freya (María Félix) as bait, convince neutral Spaniard Ulises Ferragut to navigate a ship to put naval mines around British ports in the Mediterranean, telling him they would never fire on passenger ships. But one mine destroys the ship his son, Esteban, was on, killing him and many others. Searching for revenge, Ulises changes his mind and becomes a friend of the allies.

When U.S. troops take over Naples, Ulises chases the boss of the German spies, who is executed later. Freya begs for her life, but Ulises cannot forgive her, and she is executed too. Finally Ulises dies when his ship is bombed by the Luftwaffe.

== Cast ==
- María Félix as Freya
- Fernando Rey as Ulises / Capitán Ferragut
- Guillermo Marín as Von Kramer / Conde Gavelin
- José Nieto as Kurt
- Juan Espantaleón as Tío Caragón
- Porfiria Sanchíz as Doctora Fedelman
- Eduardo Fajardo as Capitán
- Ángel de Andrés as Toni
- Rafael Romero Marchent as Esteban
- Nerio Bernardi as Enrico De Paoli
- Osvaldo Genazzani as John
- Arturo Marín as Jefe tribunal militar
- Félix Fernandez as Recepcionista hotel
- José Franco as Maitre
- José Prada as Miembro tribunal
- Manuel Aguilera as Telegrafista
- Santiago Rivero as Capitán
- António Vilar
- Teresa Arcos
- Francisco Bernal

== Bibliography ==
- Bentley, Bernard P. E. (2008). A Companion to Spanish Cinema. Boydell & Brewer Ltd. ISBN 978-1-85566-176-9.
