= Eduardo Marquina =

Spanish playwright and poet

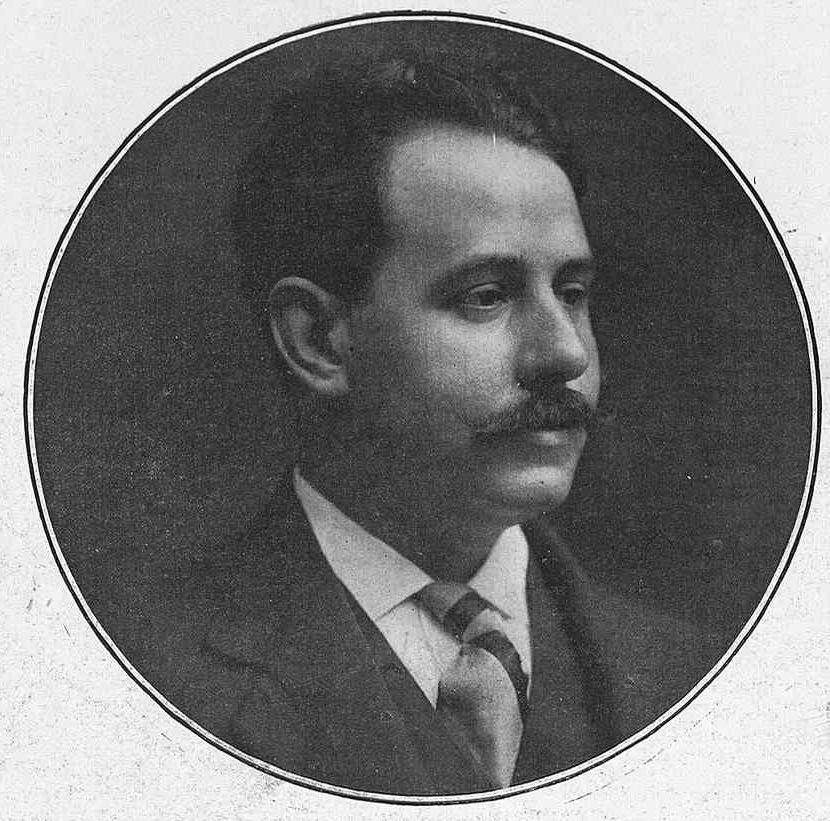
- Born: Eduardo Marquina Angulo; 21 January 1879; Barcelona, Spain
- Died: 21 November 1946 (aged 67); New York City, United States
- Occupation(s): Author and playwright

Seat G of the Real Academia Española
- In office 3 August 1939 – 21 November 1946
- Preceded by: Pedro de Novo y Colson
- Succeeded by: José María de Cossío

Eduardo Marquina Angulo (21 January 1879 – 21 November 1946) was a Spanish playwright and poet associated with the Catalan Modernist school. His En Flandes se ha puesto el Sol (The Sun Has Set in Flanders) was awarded the Royal Spanish Academy's award for historical drama. He also wrote lyrics for the Spanish anthem Marcha Real, used during the reign of Alfonso XIII.

== Selected filmography ==
- The Nail (1944)
- Thirsty Land (1945)
