= Milagros Leal =

Spanish actress

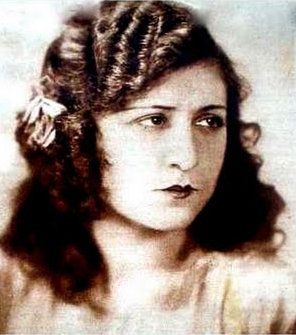
- Milagros Leal
- Born: 2 December 1902
- Died: 2 March 1975 (aged 72)
- Occupation: Spanish actor

Milagros Leal (2 December 1902 – 2 March 1975) was a Spanish actress.

== Biography ==
She began her theater career as a child with the Loreto Prado and Enrique Chicote Company and, at an early age, began to enjoy success on stage, such as with the play Champán. In 1923, she began working alongside Catalina Bárcena and Gregorio Martínez Sierra, continuing until 1930, and in 1934 she created her own company. Over the course of a career spanning six decades, she established herself as one of the great ladies of the 20th-century Spanish stage, with notable successes such as Butterflies Are Free (Butterflies Are Free).

She made her film debut in 1928 and, unlike her theater career, her film career revolved almost exclusively around supporting roles, albeit solid ones.

Her daughter, Amparo Soler Leal, born from her marriage to fellow actor Salvador Soler Marí, continued the family's artistic tradition.

== Selected theatrical works ==
- La estrella de Justina (1925)
- Mariquilla Terremoto (1930).
- Anacleto se divorcia (1932).
- La propia estimación (1941)
- Los habitantes de la casa deshabitada (1942).
- Blanca por fuera y rosa por dentro (1943).
- El pañuelo de la dama errante (1945).
- El sexo débil ha hecho gimnasia (1946).
- Don Juan Tenorio (1947).
- Víspera de bodas (1948).
- Doña Clarines (1951).
- Women's Town (1953).
- La muralla (1954)
- Enriqueta sí, Enriqueta no (1954).
- Los intereses creados (1956)
- La novia del espacio (1956)
- El pan de todos (1957).
- Ondina (obra de teatro) (1958)
- Un soñador para un pueblo (1958).
- Anna Christie (obra de teatro)|Anna Christie (1959)
- Medea (1959).
- Hamlet (1960).
- Divinas palabras (1961).
- De profesión sospechoso (1962).
- Tomy's Secret (1963).
- La barca sin pescador (1963).
- Los árboles mueren de pie (obra teatral)|Los árboles mueren de pie (1963).
- Ligazón (1966).
- El baño de las ninfas (1966).

== Selected filmography ==
- The Nail (1944)
- Lessons in Good Love (1944)
- The Phantom and Dona Juanita (1945)
- The Holy Queen (1947)
- Anguish (1947)
- Our Lady of Fatima (1951)
- Spanish Serenade (1952)
- I Was a Parish Priest. (1953)
- Such is Madrid (1953)
- Flight 971 (1953)
- The Louts (1954)
- Judas' Kiss (1954)
- The Big Lie (1956)
- We Thieves Are Honourable (1956)
- Queen of The Chantecler (1962)
- The Fair of the Dove (1963)
- The Man Who Wanted to Kill Himself (1970)
