= Irene Caba Alba =

Spanish actress (1905–1957)

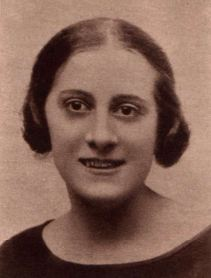
- Irene Caba Alba in 1931
- Born: 25 August 1905; Buenos Aires, Argentina
- Died: 14 January 1957 (aged 51); Madrid, Spain
- Occupation: Actress
- Years active: 1935–1957 (film)

Irene Caba Alba (25 August 1905 – 14 January 1957) was an Argentine-born Spanish stage and film actress. She appeared in forty films during her career including The Nail. She was born into a family of actors, the daughter of Irene Alba and the sister of Julia Caba Alba.

== Filmography ==
- The Dancer and the Worker (1936)
- Nuestra Natacha (1936)
- Madre Alegría (1937)
- Nuestro culpable (1938)
- Il peccato di Rogelia Sanchez (1940)
- Santa Rogelia (1940)
- The Birth of Salome (1940)
- Fortuna (1940)
- Whirlwind (1941)
- ¡A mí no me mire usted! (1941)
- ¿Por qué vivir tristes? (1942)
- Boda en el infierno (1942)
- Te quiero para mí (1944)
- The Nail (1944)
- Thirsty Land (1945)
- Cinco lobitos (1945)
- The Prodigal Woman (1946)
- -Las inquietudes de Shanti Andía (1947)
- The Faith (1947)
- The Sunless Street (1948)
- Guest of Darkness (1948)
- The Duchess of Benameji (1949)
- That Luzmela Girl (1949)
- Woman to Woman (1950)
- La niña de Luzmela (1950)
- Torturados (1952)
- La laguna negra (1952)
- Jeromín (1953)
- Such is Madrid (1953)
- Boyfriend in Sight (1954)
- Viento del norte (1954)
- Un caballero andaluz (1954)
- An Andalusian Gentleman (1954)
- An Impossible Crime (1954)
- We Two (1955)
- Un día perdido (1955)
- La lupa (1955)
- El piyayo (1956)
- The Big Lie (1956)
- La vida en un bloc (1956)
- Piedras vivas (1956)
- La ironía del dinero (1957)

== Bibliography ==
- Hortelano, Lorenzo J. Torres. Directory of World Cinema: Spain. Intellect Books, 2011.
