= Saturday Night (1950 film) =

1950 film

- Directed by: Rafael Gil
- Written by: Antonio Abad Ojuel; Jacinto Benavente (play); Rafael Gil
- Produced by: Cesáreo González
- Starring: María Félix; Rafael Durán; José María Seoane
- Cinematography: Michel Kelber
- Edited by: José Antonio Rojo
- Music by: Manuel Parada
- Production company: Suevia Films
- Distributed by: Suevia Films
- Release date: 29 December 1950
- Running time: 96 minutes
- Country: Spain
- Language: Spanish

Saturday Night (Spanish: La noche del sábado) is a 1950 Spanish drama film directed by Rafael Gil and starring María Félix, Rafael Durán and José María Seoane. It is a film adaptation of the 1918 play of the same name, Saturday Night: A Novel For The Stage In Five Tableaux by playwright Jacinto Benavente. The film's sets were designed by Enrique Alarcón.

== Plot ==
In Rome, the sculptor Leonardo Alfieri hires a beautiful dancer to make a statue that he hopes will be his masterpiece. The work causes a sensation throughout the country and draws the attention of Prince Florencio, heir to the Preslavian throne. Finally, the girl, dazzled by the possibility of leaving poverty behind, leaves everything, including her own daughter, to go with the prince.

== Cast ==
- María Félix as Imperia
- Rafael Durán as Príncipe Miguel
- José María Seoane as Leonardo
- Manolo Fábregas as Príncipe Florencio
- María Rosa Salgado as Donina
- Virgílio Teixeira as Nunú
- Mariano Asquerino as Harrison
- Juan Espantaleón as Precepto de Preslavia
- Julia Delgado Caro as Majestad
- Luis Hurtado as Dueño del garito
- María Asquerino as Condesa
- Manuel Kayser as Padre de Imperia
- Diego Hurtado as Amigo de Nunú
- José Prada as Sirviente
- Fernando Aguirre as Fotógrafo
- Fernando Fernán Gómez as Director de orquesta
- Manuel Aguilera as Hombre en bar
- Francisco Bernal as Hombre en bar
- Antonio Fraguas
- Manuel Rosellón
- Carmen Sánchez
- José Vivó

== Bibliography ==
- Mira, Alberto. Historical Dictionary of Spanish Cinema. Scarecrow Press, 2010.
