= José Antonio Rojo =

Spanish film editor (1923–1995)

- Born: 1923; Madrid
- Died: 25 February 1995 (aged 71–72); Madrid
- Occupation: Film editor
- Years active: 1943-1995 (film)

José Antonio Rojo (1923-1995) was a Spanish film editor. He worked on more than two hundred films during his career.

== Selected filmography ==
- Mare Nostrum (1948)
- Just Any Woman (1949)
- Saturday Night (1950)
- The Black Crown (1951)
- Our Lady of Fatima (1951)
- From Madrid to Heaven (1952)
- Gloria Mairena (1952)
- The Song of Sister Maria (1952)
- Airport (1953)
- I Was a Parish Priest. (1953)
- He Died Fifteen Years Ago (1954)
- An Andalusian Gentleman (1954)
- Judas' Kiss (1954)
- The Cock Crow (1955)
- The Other Life of Captain Contreras (1955)
- The Big Lie (1956)
- Miracle of the White Suit (1956)
- We Thieves Are Honourable (1956)
- Las chicas de la Cruz Roja (1958)
- The Dance (1959)
- Luxury Cabin (1959)
- My Street (1960)
- Plácido (1961)
- The Gang of Eight (1962)
- Aragonese Nobility (1965)
- Seven Dollars on the Red (1966)
- The Wild Ones of San Gil Bridge (1966)
- Pepa Doncel (1969)
- A Decent Adultery (1969)
- More Dollars for the MacGregors (1970)
- The Rebellious Novice (1971)
- The Girl from the Red Cabaret (1973)
- The Marriage Revolution (1974)
- Blood and Sand (1989)

== Bibliography ==
- Peter Cowie & Derek Elley. World Filmography: 1967. Fairleigh Dickinson University Press, 1977.
