= Lessons in Good Love =

- Directed by: Rafael Gil
- Written by: Jacinto Benavente; Rafael Gil
- Cinematography: Alfredo Fraile
- Music by: Juan Quintero
- Production company: Rey Soria
- Distributed by: Rey Soria
- Release date: 5 June 1944
- Running time: 91 minutes
- Country: Spain
- Language: Spanish

Lessons in Good Love (Spanish:Lecciones de buen amor) is a 1944 Spanish film directed by Rafael Gil.

== Cast ==
- Juan Domenech
- Félix Fernández
- Milagros Leal
- Luis Martínez
- Manolo Morán
- José Orjas
- Nicolás D. Perchicot
- Pastora Peña
- Rafael Rivelles
- Mercedes Vecino

== Bibliography ==
- de España, Rafael. Directory of Spanish and Portuguese film-makers and films. Greenwood Press, 1994.
