= The Autonomines =

- Spanish film poster
- Spanish: Las autonosuyas
- Directed by: Rafael Gil
- Screenplay by: Fernando Vizcaíno Casas
- Based on: Las autonosuyas by Fernando Vizcaíno Casas
- Starring: Alfredo Landa; María Casanova; Manolo Codeso
- Cinematography: José F. Aguayo
- Edited by: José Luis Matesanz
- Music by: Gregorio García Segura
- Production company: Coral Producciones Cinematográficas
- Release date: 4 August 1983
- Running time: 89 minutes
- Country: Spain
- Language: Spanish

The Autonomines (Spanish: Las autonosuyas) is a 1983 Spanish comedy film directed by Rafael Gil from a screenplay by Fernando Vizcaíno Casas based on the latter's novel of the same name. It stars Alfredo Landa, María Casanova, and Manolo Codeso. The plot is set in a fictional village of Rebollar the la Mata in the Madrid mountains. The film is a neo-Francoist political satire that criticises the perceived democratic overreaches during the Transition in Spain specially focusing on the autonomous communities.

== Partial cast ==
- Alfredo Landa as Austrasigildo
- María Casanova as Inés
- Manolo Codeso as Cojoncio
- Fernando Sancho as Bernardo
- Ángel de Andrés as Telesforo
- Alfonso del Real as Mambrú
- José Bódalo as Don Luciano
- Antonio Garisa as Minister
- Ismael Merlo as Don Ángel
- Mary Paz Pondal as Nuria
- Elvira Quintillá as Faustina
- Adrián Ortega as Don Benigno
- Tomás Blanco as Basque ambassador
- Pepe Ruiz as Don Marceliano
- Rafael Hernández as José
- Luis Barbero as Nicomedes
- Lola Lemos as Abuela
- Félix Dafauce as Marciano
- Juan José Otegui as Nicomedes hijo
- Valentín Gascón as Isolino
- Ricardo Palacios as Rafa
- Carlos Lucas as Poli
- Alejandro de Enciso
- Miguel del Castillo
- Rafael Conesa
- Luis Rico
