= El canto del gallo =

- Directed by: Rafael Gil
- Written by: Vicente Escrivá; Ramón D. Faraldo; José Antonio Giménez-Arnau
- Produced by: Ramón Llidó
- Cinematography: Alfredo Fraile
- Edited by: José Antonio Rojo
- Music by: Juan Quintero
- Production company: Aspa Producciones Cinematográficas
- Release date: 26 September 1955
- Running time: 95 minutes
- Country: Spain
- Language: Spanish

El canto del gallo is a 1955 Spanish drama film directed by Rafael Gil.

== Plot ==
In Hungary, during World War II and at a time when religious were being killed, Gans, a powerful communist commissar, saves the life of Father Miller, a former classmate. But in return he forces him to abjure his Catholic faith and go live with a prostitute. After that, Father Miller commits other sins such as denying confession to a dying man or ratting out a fellow priest. But repenting of his conduct, he returns to his old parish, where he will meet Gans again.

== Cast ==
- Asunción Balaguer
- S. Demoslavsky
- Vicente Escrivá as child
- Gracián Espinosa
- César Gil as child
- Antonio García Gómez
- X. Heiss
- José Luis Heredia
- Francisco Herrera
- Luis Induni
- Julia Lajos
- Ivan Ljevakovich
- Hortuño López
- José Manuel Martín
- Jorge Ochando
- Alicia Palacios
- Mónica Pastrana
- Jacqueline Pierreux
- Félix de Pomés
- Francisco Rabal
- G. Rahn
- Antonio Riquelme
- Carmen Rodríguez
- Matilde Muñoz Sampedro
- Emilio Sancho
- Francisco Sánchez
- Porfiria Sanchíz
- Gérard Tichy
- José Villasante
- Lutz Wallen
- M. Wulff
- José Wyrma

== Bibliography ==
- Bentley, Bernard. A Companion to Spanish Cinema. Boydell & Brewer 2008.
