= Apollo Theatre (film) =

1950 Spanish musical film

- Directed by: Rafael Gil
- Written by: Antonio Abad Ojuel; Carlos Fernández Cuenca; Rafael Gil
- Produced by: Cesáreo González
- Starring: Jorge Negrete; María de los Ángeles Morales; Juan Espantaleón
- Cinematography: César Fraile
- Music by: Emilio Arrieta; Caballero; Pablo Luna
- Production company: Suevia Films
- Distributed by: Suevia Films
- Release date: 30 October 1950
- Running time: 105 minutes
- Country: Spain
- Language: Spanish

Apollo Theatre (Spanish: Teatro Apolo is a 1950 Spanish musical film directed by Rafael Gil and starring Jorge Negrete, María de los Ángeles Morales and Juan Espantaleón. It takes its title from the Teatro Apolo in Madrid.

== Cast ==
- Jorge Negrete as Miguel Velasco
- María de los Ángeles Morales as Celia Morales
- Juan Espantaleón as Don Antonio
- Julia Lajos as Doña Flora
- María Asquerino as Elena Ramos
- Luis Hurtado
- Rafael Arcos as Miguelito
- Manuel Arbó
- Francisco Pierrá
- Luis Pérez de León
- Antonio Riquelme as Aspirante a sustituir

== Bibliography ==
- Labanyi, Jo & Pavlović, Tatjana. A Companion to Spanish Cinema. John Wiley & Sons, 2012.
