= Rafael Arcos =

Argentine actor (1926–1991)

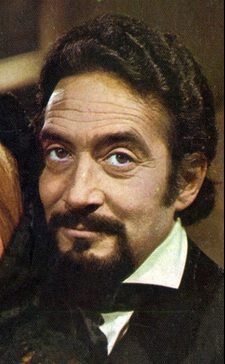
- Arcos in 1974
- Born: 1926; Buenos Aires, Argentina
- Died: 28 January 1991 (aged 64–65); Madrid, Spain
- Occupation: Actor
- Years active: 1946–2002

Rafael Arcos (1926–1991) was an Argentine film and television actor who appeared in many Spanish productions. He also worked as a voice actor, dubbing foreign-language films for release in the Spanish market.

== Selected filmography ==
- Apollo Theatre (1950)
- The Seventh Page (1951)
- Amaya (1952)
- Imperial Violets (1952)
- Gloria Mairena (1952)
- The Beauty of Cadiz (1953)
- Outstanding (1953)
- Such is Madrid (1953)
- Viento del norte (1954)
- Love in a Hot Climate (1954)
- Rebellion (1954)
- Alegre juventud (1963)

== Bibliography ==
- Barba, Francesc Sánchez. Brumas del franquismo: el auge del cine negro español (1950-1965). Edicions Universitat Barcelona, 2007.
- Goble, Alan. The Complete Index to Literary Sources in Film. Walter de Gruyter, 1999.
