= Such is Madrid =

1953 film by Luis Marquina

- Directed by: Luis Marquina
- Written by: Carlos Arniches (play); José Luis Colina; Luis Marquina
- Produced by: Felipe Mayo
- Starring: Susana Canales; José Suárez; Manolo Morán
- Cinematography: Heinrich Gärtner
- Edited by: Magdalena Pulido
- Production companies: ATA; Cinesol
- Distributed by: CIFESA
- Release date: 21 September 1953
- Running time: 85 minutes
- Country: Spain
- Language: Spanish

Such is Madrid (Spanish: Así es Madrid) is a 1953 Spanish comedy film directed by Luis Marquina and starring Susana Canales, José Suárez and Manolo Morán.

== Cast ==
- Susana Canales as Eulalia
- José Suárez as Antonio
- Manolo Morán as Julián
- Julia Caba Alba as Carmen
- José Isbert as Dimas
- Lina Canalejas as Luisa
- Rafael Arcos as Mariano
- Irene Caba Alba as Sabina
- Gaspar Campos as Illecas
- Milagros Leal as Regina
- Ricardo Canales as Damián
- Antonio Riquelme as Peluquero
- José Orjas as Ramón
- Amparo Soler Leal as Pitita
- Juan Antonio Riquelme as Sindulfo
- Aurora de Alba as Cantaora
- Francisco Bernal as Portero
- Julia Pachelo as Mujer de Baldomero
- Arturo Marín as Policía
- Emilio Santiago as Baldomero
- María Francés as Vecina
- Manuel Guitián as Tabernero
- Josefina Serratosa as Portera
- Fernando Nogueras as Paco
- Antonio Molino Rojo as Bailarín

== Bibliography ==
- Bentley, Bernard. A Companion to Spanish Cinema. Boydell & Brewer 2008.
