= The Nail (film) =

- Spanish film poster
- Directed by: Rafael Gil
- Written by: Rafael Gil; Eduardo Marquina
- Produced by: Alfredo Matas
- Starring: Amparo Rivelles; Rafael Durán; Juan Espantaleón; Milagros Leal; Joaquín Roa; Irene Caba Alba; José Franco
- Cinematography: Alfredo Fraile
- Edited by: Juan Serra
- Music by: José Quintero
- Distributed by: CIFESA
- Release dates: 5 October 1944 (Spain); 30 June 1949 (U.S.)
- Running time: 99 minutes
- Country: Spain
- Language: Spanish

The Nail (Spanish: El Clavo) is a 1944 Spanish romance drama film directed by Rafael Gil. It is based on the novel of the same title by Pedro Antonio de Alarcón.

== Plot ==
Castile, 19th Century. Judge Joaquín Zarco (Rafael Durán) travel in a stagecoach with a beautiful woman, Blanca (Amparo Rivelles). It is Carnavile. They fall in love but she disappears...

== Crew ==
Future filmmaker José Antonio Nieves Conde was the director's assistant.

== Reception ==
The movie was a great success upon its release. In 1944, it won second place in the Best Film category of the 'National Syndicate of Spectacle.
