= António Vilar =

Portuguese actor

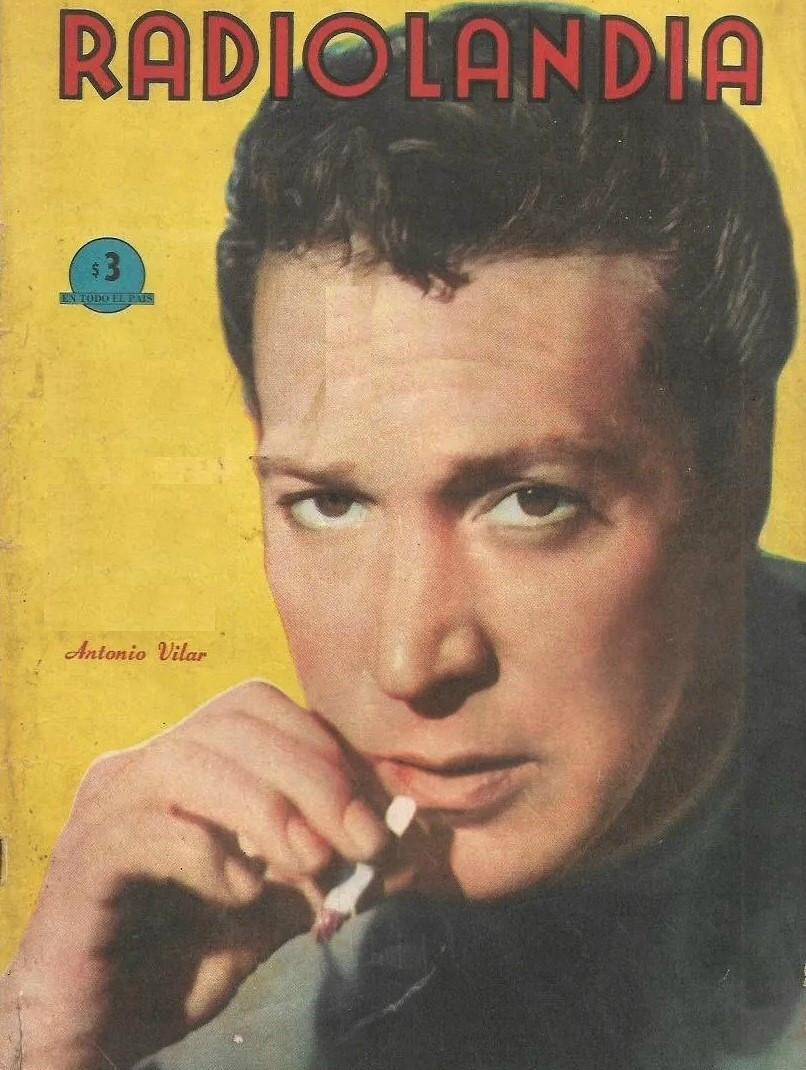
- Born: October 31, 1912; Lisbon, Portugal
- Died: August 16, 1995 (aged 82); Madrid, Spain
- Years active: 1940–1980

António Vilar (October 31, 1912 – August 16, 1995) was a Portuguese actor who worked in Spanish cinema as well as appearing in at least one French film and in one Italian film. He also acted in Portuguese cinema

== Selected filmography ==
- O pátio das cantigas (1942)
- Camões (1946)
- The Holy Queen (Spanish: Reina santa) (1947) as Denis, King of Portugal
- Mare Nostrum (1948)
- Guarany (1948)
- The Sunless Street (1948)
- Just Any Woman (1949)
- Wings of Youth (1949)
- Don Juan (1950)
- Dawn of America (1951)
- Beautiful Love (1951)
- Love and Desire (1951)
- Maleficio (1953)
- El festín de Satanás (1955)
- La Quintrala (1955)
- Los hermanos corsos (1955)
- Night and Dawn (1958)
- Il padrone delle ferriere (1959)
- The Woman and the Puppet (1959)
- Shéhérazade (1963)
- Proceso a la Ley (1964)
- High Season for Spies (1966)
