= La mujer dorada =

- Starring: Amparo Rivelles
- Country of origin: Mexico
- Original language: Spanish

Production
- Producer: Ernesto Alonso

La mujer dorada (Spanish pronunciation: [la muˈxeɾ ðoˈɾaða]; "The Golden Woman") is a name of an former Mexican telenovela (soap opera). It was made in 1960. Each episode was thirty minutes long.

== Cast ==
- Amparo Rivelles — Elvira
- Enrique Rambal — Máximo
- Rita Macedo — Hilda
- Guillermo Murray — Félix
- Andrea López — Patricia
- Enrique Álvarez Félix — Alfonso
- Enrique Lizalde — Lucio
- Emilia Carranza — Pantera
- Manolo García — Borrego
- José Antonio Cossío — Faquir
