= Amparo Rivelles =

Spanish actress (1925–2013)

The Most Excellent Amparo Rivelles
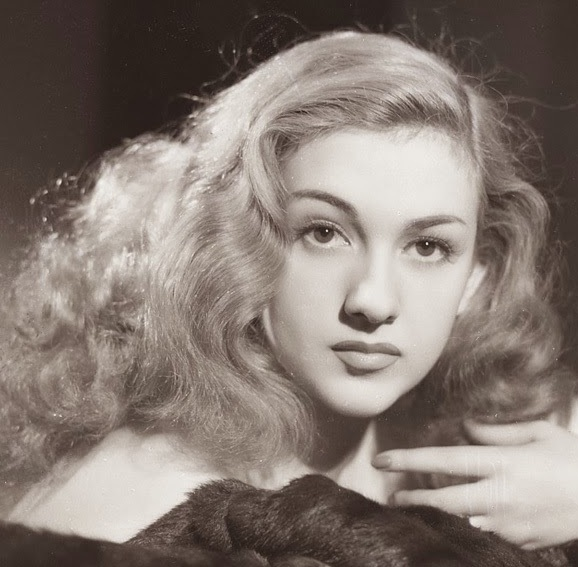
- Rivelles in 1940
- Born: María Amparo Rivelles Ladrón de Guevara; 11 February 1925; Madrid, Spain
- Died: 7 November 2013 (aged 88); Madrid, Spain
- Other name: Amparito Rivelles
- Occupation: Actress
- Father: Rafael Rivelles

María Amparo Rivelles Ladrón de Guevara (11 February 1925 – 7 November 2013) was a Spanish actress.

== Life and career ==
Born in Madrid on 11 February 1925, she was the daughter of actor Rafael Rivelles and actress María Fernanda Ladrón de Guevara, and the half-sister of actor Carlos Larrañaga.

She made her film debut in Armando Vidal's Mari Juana. She went on to have a long career in Spanish cinema with lead roles in films both iconic for the Francoist regime and complicit with its values. She was reputed for her "elegant, sophisticated, haughty" style.

She spent 20 years in Mexico, where she worked in Mexican films and telenovelas.

During her long career, she earned a LatinACE award, a Goya Award, as well as a National Theater Prize.

== Selected filmography ==
- El olor de las manzanas (1999)
- Sombras y luces. Cien años de cine español (1996)
- El día que nací yo (1991)
- Esquilache (1989)
- Hay que deshacer la casa (1983)
- La coquito (1977)
- ¿Quién mató al abuelo? (1971)
- El juicio de los hijos (1970)
- Una vez un hombre... (1970)
- La cruz de Marisa Cruces (1969)
- Anita de Montemar (1969)
- La casa de las muchachas (1969)
- Los problemas de mamá (1968)
- El dia de las madres (1968)
- Cuando los hijos se van (1968)
- Los novios de mis hijas (1964)
- La mujer dorada
- Un ángel tuvo la culpa (1960)
- El Esqueleto de la señora Morales (1960)
- El amor que yo te di (1959)
- The Battalion in the Shadows (1957)
- Mr. Arkadin (1955)
- El indiano (1954)
- The Lioness of Castille (1951)
- Dawn of America (1951)
- Woman to Woman (1950)
- The Duchess of Benameji (1949)
- The Sunless Street (1948)
- Si te hubieses casado conmigo (1948)
- Fuenteovejuna (1947)
- Anguish (1947)
- The Faith (1947)
- The Nail (1944)
- Eugenia de Montijo (1944)
- Eloisa Is Under an Almond Tree (1943)
- Deliciosamente tontos (1943)
- A Famous Gentleman (1943)
- Malvaloca (1942)
- We Thieves Are Honourable (1942)
- Heart of Gold (1941)

== Honours ==
- Gold Medal of Merit in Labour (13 December 2002)
