= The Duchess of Benameji (play) =

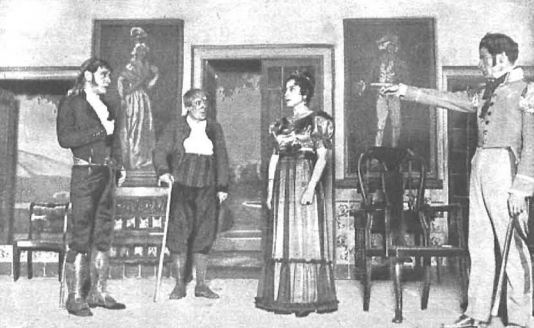
A performance of the play in 1932.

The Duchess of Benameji (Spanish:La duquesa de Benamejí) is a 1932 Spanish play written by the brothers Antonio and Manuel Machado. In 1949 the play was turned into a large budget film The Duchess of Benameji directed by Luis Lucia Mingarro.

== Bibliography ==
- Bentley, Bernard. A Companion to Spanish Cinema. Boydell & Brewer 2008.
