= We Thieves Are Honourable (play) =

We Thieves Are Honourable (Spanish:Los ladrones somos gente honrada) is a 1941 play by the Spanish writer Enrique Jardiel Poncela. The play is a comedy about a botched robbery at a suburban home. It has been adapted into films twice: We Thieves Are Honourable (1942) and We Thieves Are Honourable (1956).

== Bibliography ==
- Goble, Alan. The Complete Index to Literary Sources in Film. Walter de Gruyter, 1999.
