= Julia Caba Alba =

Spanish actress (1902–1988)

The Most Excellent Julia Caba Alba
- Born: 31 July 1902; Madrid, Spain
- Died: 14 November 1988 (aged 86); Madrid, Spain
- Occupation: Actress
- Years active: 1940–1979

Julia Caba Alba (31 July 1902 – 14 November 1988) was a Spanish actress who appeared in more than a hundred films and television series during her career. She was a noted character actress. Her sister was the actress Irene Caba Alba.

== Selected filmography ==
- Saint Rogelia (1940)
- The Sin of Rogelia Sanchez (1940)
- The Bullfighter's Suit (1947)
- Anguish (1947)
- The Sunless Street (1948)
- The Howl (1948)
- Just Any Woman (1949)
- Ninety Minutes (1949)
- The Duchess of Benameji (1949)
- Troubled Lives (1949)
- The Maragatan Sphinx (1950)
- Thirty Nine Love Letters (1950)
- Black Sky (1951)
- Our Lady of Fatima (1951)
- Malibran's Song (1951)
- The Seventh Page (1951)
- Captain Poison (1951)
- From Madrid to Heaven (1952)
- The Song of Sister Maria (1952)
- Sister San Sulpicio (1952)
- Such is Madrid (1953)
- I Was a Parish Priest. (1953)
- Airport (1953)
- Morena Clara (1954)
- Malvaloca (1954)
- An Andalusian Gentleman (1954)
- It Happened in Seville (1955)
- Let's Make the Impossible! (1958)
- Luxury Cabin (1959)
- Maribel and the Strange Family (1960)
- You and Me Are Three (1962)
- Queen of The Chantecler (1962)
- Aragonese Nobility (1965)
- He's My Man! (1966)
- Road to Rocío (1966)
- Fruit of Temptation (1968)
- The Man Who Wanted to Kill Himself (1970)

== Honors ==
- 1977 – Gold Medal of Merit in Labour (Kingdom of Spain, 23 April 1977).

== Bibliography ==
- Mira, Alberto. The A to Z of Spanish Cinema. Rowman & Littlefield, 2010.
