= The Duchess of Benameji (film) =

1949 film

- Directed by: Luis Lucia
- Written by: Antonio Machado (play); Manuel Machado (play); José María Pemán; Ricardo Blasco; Luis Lucia
- Starring: Amparo Rivelles
- Cinematography: Theodore J. Pahle
- Edited by: Juan Serra
- Music by: Juan Quintero
- Production company: CIFESA
- Distributed by: CIFESA
- Release date: 26 October 1949
- Running time: 103 minutes
- Country: Spain
- Language: Spanish

The Duchess of Benameji (Spanish: La duquesa de Benamejí) is a 1949 Spanish historical drama film directed by Luis Lucia and starring Amparo Rivelles. The film is set in the nineteenth century, with Rivelles playing dual roles as a countess and a gypsy. The film was an expensive costume production by Spain's largest studio CIFESA. It is an adaptation of the 1932 play of the same name by Antonio and Manuel Machado. Before its release, the censor demanded that it be rewritten to more overtly punish bandits.

== Cast ==
- Amparo Rivelles
- Jorge Mistral

And in alphabetical order

- Manuel Aguilera
- Fernando Aguirre
- Valeriano Andrés as Teniente
- Mariano Asquerino
- Francisco Bernal
- Irene Caba Alba
- Julia Caba Alba
- Benito Cobeña
- Alfonso de Córdoba
- Carlos Díaz de Mendoza
- Eduardo Fajardo
- Félix Fernandez
- Manuel Guitián
- Casimiro Hurtado
- José Jaspe
- Manuel Luna
- Juana Mansó
- Ángel Martinez
- Arturo Marín
- Miguel Pastor
- Manuel Requena
- Antonio Riquelme
- Domingo Rivas

== Bibliography ==
- Bentley, Bernard. A Companion to Spanish Cinema. Boydell & Brewer 2008.
