= José Nieto (actor) =

Spanish actor

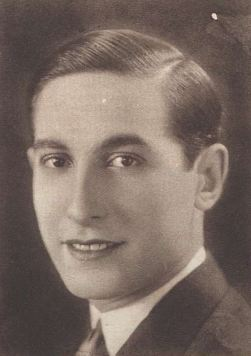
- José Nieto in 1932
- Born: José García López; 3 May 1903; Murcia, Spain
- Died: 10 August 1982 (aged 79); Almonte (Huelva), Spain
- Occupation: Actor
- Years active: 1925 – 1983

José García López (3 May 1903 – 10 August 1982), better known as José Nieto, was a Spanish actor. He appeared in more than one hundred films from 1925 to 1983.

== Biography ==
José Nieto (stage name) made his film debut in Florián Rey El Lazarillo de Tormes, released in 1925. He appeared in eight other Spanish Silent films, the last of which was released in 1929.

His first four talking films, released in 1931 and 1932, were American productions by 20th Century Studios, shot in Hollywood, Los Angeles in Spanish. Let us mention Cuerpo y alma by David Howard (director) (1931), the simultaneous English version of which is Body and Soul (1931 film) by Alfred Santell.

He subsequently contributed to numerous foreign films and co-productions shot entirely or partially in his native country, such as Robert Vernay Andalousie (a French-Spanish film from 1951, starring Luis Mariano and Carmen Sevilla), King Vidor's Solomon and the Queen of Sheba (American film, 1959, starring Yul Brynner and Gina Lollobrigida), and Orson Welles Falstaff (Spanish-Swiss film, 1965, starring the director in the title role, John Gielgud, and Jeanne Moreau).

Among his Spanish films are Carlos Saura's El jardín de las delicias (The Garden of Delights, 1970, starring José Luis López Vázquez and Esperanza Roy). The last of his 145 films (including several spaghetti westerns) was Polvos mágicos by José Ramón Larraz (starring Alfredo Landa and Carmen Villani), an Italian-Spanish co-production released in 1983, the year after his death.

On Television, José Nieto appeared in nine series between 1966 and 1979. The first two are American, including I Spy (1965 TV series) (one episode, 1967).

== Filmography ==
Film
Year	Title	Role	Notes
1925	El lazarillo de Tormes		
1926	The Girl from Bejar		
1926	La sirena del Cantábrico		
1926	La malcasada		
1926	Carnival Figures		
1927	Raza de hidalgos		
1927	Los hijos del trabajo		
1928	La condesa María		
1929	La del Soto del Parral		
1931	Cuerpo y alma	Tap	
1931	Mamá	Alfonso de Heredia	
1931	Eran trece	Capitán Kin	
1932	Marido y mujer	Jim Haley	
1935	Tango Bar	Inspector	
1938	Three Blind Mice	Spanish Singer	Uncredited
1939	El milagro de la calle mayor	Trio Member	
1939	Il segreto inviolabile	Bob, il sognatore	
1940	Manolenka		
1940	Su mayor aventura		
1941	Escuadrilla	Capitán Pablo Campos	
1941	Sarasate		
1942	Raza	Pedro Churruca	
1942	Éramos siete a la mesa		
1942	Boda en el infierno	Carlos Ocharán	
1943	Idilio en Mallorca		
1943	El abanderado	Velarde	
1943	Café de París		
1943	A Palace for Sale	Napoleón	
1944	Orosia	Joselón	
1944	Y tú, ¿quién eres?		
1944	Aventura	Andrés	
1944	Te quiero para mí	Heredia	
1944	Cabeza de hierro	Álvaro Velasco, 'Cabeza de Hierro'	
1944	Garabatos José Nieto	Himself	
1945	Last Stand in the Philippines	Capitán Enrique de las Morenas	
1946	Audiencia pública	Abogado defensor	
1947	The Holy Queen	Vasco Peres, the alderman	
1947	El traje de luces		
1947	Noche sin cielo	Julio	
1947	The Captain's Ship	Capitán Diego Ruiz	
1948	Mi enemigo el doctor	Doctor Campos	
1948	El tambor del Bruch	Enric Torelló	
1948	Canción mortal		
1948	The Sunless Street	Luis	
1948	Mare Nostrum	Kurt	
1949	Don Juan de Serrallonga	Fadri de Sau	
1949	¡Olé torero!		
1949	Just Any Woman	Vecino	
1949	Wings of Youth		
1949	Aventuras de Juan Lucas		Uncredited
1949	Peace	Médico comandante	
1949	His Heart Awake	Antonio, director	
1950	Black Jack	Inspector Carnero	
1951	The Dream of Andalusia	Vicente	
1951	Our Lady of Fatima	Pilgrim	
1951	The Girl at the Inn	Captain 'Tiburon'	
1952	Aventuras y desventuras de Eduardini		
1952	Estrella of the Sierra Morena	Juan María	
1952	Path to the Kingdom	Manuel	
1953	Sombrero	Performer in 'Eufemia' Sequence	Uncredited
1953	La alegre caravana		
1953	Condemned to Hang	Chiclanero	
1953	Nobody Will Know	Jefe de los gánsgters	
1953	Flight 971	Comandante Pedro Zubiri	
1954	Two Patha	Comandante	
1954	Two Paths	Eliazim	
1954	Cañas y barro	Tío Toni	
1954	Tres huchas para Oriente	José López	
1955	Miracle of Marcelino	Civil Guard Commander	
1955	Father Cigarette		
1955	That Lady	Don Juan de Escobedo	
1955	Contraband Spain	Pierre, lead henchman	
1955	La cruz de mayo	Pepe Platino	
1956	Alexander the Great	Spithridates	
1956	La gata	Manuel	
1956	Contraband Spain		
1956	Tormento d'amore	Roberto	
1957	The Pride and the Passion	Carlos	
1957	Una cruz en el infierno	Laszlo	
1957	Action of the Tiger	Kol Stendho	
1957	Spanish Affair		
1957	A Farewell to Arms	Major Stampi	
1958	La mina	Capobarca	
1958	The Night Heaven Fell	Comte Miguel de Ribera	
1958	Bread, Love and Andalusia	Don Pablo	
1959	Honeymoon	Juan Carmona	
1959	John Paul Jones	Red Cherry	
1959	Solomon and Sheba	Ahab	
1959	Tommy the Toreador	Inspector Quintero	
1959	El casco blanco		
1960	The Little Colonel		
1960	El traje de oro		
1960	Un paso al frente		
1960	The Revolt of the Slaves	Sesto	
1961	King of Kings	Caspar	
1962	Kill and Be Killed	Comisario Ávila	
1962	The Son of Captain Blood	Capitan De Malagon	
1962	Savage Guns	Ortega	
1962	Rogelia	Preso	
1963	55 Days at Peking	Italian Minister	
1963	Tela de araña	Don Álvaro	
1963	The Magnificent Adventurer	Connestabile di Borbone	
1963	The Ceremony	Inspector	
1964	The Avenger of Venice	Dandolo	
1964	Man of the Cursed Valley	Sam Burnett	
1964	Texas Ranger	Ranger Mayor	
1965	The Thief of Tibidabo	Van Ecker	
1965	Wild Kurdistan	Pir Kamek	
1965	Our Agent Tiger	Pepe Nieto	
1965	Chimes at Midnight	Northumberland	
1965	Doctor Zhivago	Priest	Uncredited
1965	El proscrito del río Colorado	Camargo	
1966	Kid Rodelo	Thomas Reese	
1966	Clarines y campanas		
1966	Savage Pampas	Gen. Chavez	
1967	The Hellbenders	The Sheriff	
1967	Le canard en fer blanc		Uncredited
1967	Cervantes	Minister of Felipe II	
1968	The Mark of the Wolfman	Count Sigmund von Aarenberg	
1969	Agáchate, que disparan	Jefe de los espías	
	Minikillers starring Diana Rigg	Drug Boss	
1970	Hola... señor Dios	Viajante / Melchor	
1970	The Garden of Delights	Ejecutivo	
1971	Black Beauty	Lorent	
1971	El hombre que vino del odio		
1971	Scandalous John	Mariachi Band	
1971	Dead Men Ride	Mortimer, the Sheriff	
1971	Red Sun	Murdered Mexican farmer	
1971	Catlow	General	
1971	Il lungo giorno della violenza	Captain Orozco	
1972	Un verano para matar	Mason	
1972	Una cuerda al amanecer		
1973	The Guerrilla	Valentín	
1973	Chino	Mexican	
1974	El mejor alcalde, el rey	Nuño	
1974	Una mujer prohibida	Señor elegante	
1974	Hay que matar a B.		
1975	Novios de la muerte		
1975	País S.A.	Actores invitados	
1976	La Carmen	Jefe de Carmen	
1976	The Legion Like Women	Dupont	
1976	Devil's Kiss	Duke de Haussemont	
1976	Call Girl (La vida privada de una señorita bien)	Dueño Compañía	
1976	The Second Power	Doctor Vega	
1977	Uno del millón de muertos		
1977	Pecado mortal	Don Fidel	
1977	El transexual	Padre de Lona	
1978	El francotirador	Don Rafael	
1978	El huerto del francés		
1979	Polvos mágicos	Juez Olmedo	
1980	...Y al tercer año, resucitó	Francisco Franco	
1980	Hijos de papá		(final film role)
