= José López Rubio =

Spanish playwright and filmmaker (1903-1996)

The Most Excellent José López Rubio
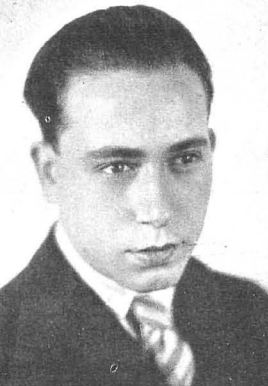
- Born: José López Rubio y Herreros; 13 December 1903; Motril (Granada), Spain
- Died: 2 March 1996 (aged 92); Madrid, Spain

Seat ñ of the Real Academia Española
- In office 5 June 1983 – 2 March 1996
- Preceded by: Seat established
- Succeeded by: Luis María Anson

José López Rubio y Herreros (13 December 1903 in Motril, Granada – 2 March 1996) was a Spanish playwright, screenwriter, film director, theatre historian, and humorist.

Rubio y Herreros worked in Hollywood as a songwriter for Paramount Pictures. On 5 June 1983, he took Seat ñ of the Real Academia Española.

== Selected filmography ==
- Primavera en otoño (1933)
- El rey de los gitanos (1933)
- It Happened in Damascus (1943)
- The Prodigal Woman (1946)
- Airport (1953)
- Currito of the Cross (1965)
- Road to Rocío (1966)
- Two Men and Two Women Amongst Them (1977)
