= Antonio Casal =

Spanish actor

- Born: 10 June 1910; Santiago de Compostela, Spain
- Died: 11 February 1974 (aged 63); Madrid, Spain
- Years active: 1941–1974

Antonio Casal Rivadulla (10 June 1910 – 11 February 1974) was a Spanish film actor who appeared in over 50 films between 1941 and his death in 1974.

== Selected filmography ==
Year	Film	Role	Notes
1958	Las chicas de la Cruz Roja	Andrés	
1953	Doña Francisquita	Cardona	
1951	La trinca del aire		
1944	The Tower of the Seven Hunchbacks	Basilio Beltrán	
1943	Traces of Light	Octavio Saldaña	
1942	The Man Who Wanted to Kill Himself	Federico Solá	
1941	Polizón a bordo	Manucho	
