= Enrique Jardiel Poncela =

Spanish playwright and novelist

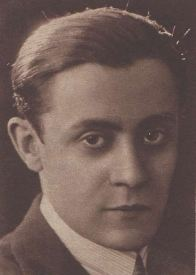
- Enrique Jardiel Poncela circa 1931
- Born: Enrique Jardiel Poncela; 15 October 1901; Madrid, Spain
- Died: 18 February 1952 (aged 50); Madrid, Spain
- Occupations: Novelist, short story writer, theatrical writer
- Children: 1
- Writing career
- Language: Spanish
- Notable works: Amor se escribe sin hache, Eloísa está debajo de un almendro, Los ladrones somos gente honrada, Los habitantes de la casa deshabitada

Enrique Jardiel Poncela (15 October 1901 – 18 February 1952) was a Spanish playwright and novelist who wrote mostly humorous works.

In 1932-33 and 1934 he was called to Hollywood to help with the Spanish-language versions shot in parallel to the English-language films.

His daughter, Evangelina, wrote a book entitled, Mi padre (My Father).

== Work ==
=== Novels ===
- Amor se escribe sin hache (1928)
- Espérame en Siberia, vida mía
- Pero... ¿hubo alguna vez once mil vírgenes? (1931)
- La tournée de Dios (1932)

=== Short stories compilations ===
- El libro del convaleciente
- Pirulís de la Habana
- Exceso de equipaje

=== Theatre ===
- El príncipe Raudhick, 1919.
- La banda de Saboya, 1922.
- Mi prima Dolly, 1923.
- ¡Te he guiñado un ojo!, 1925.
- La hoguera, 1925.
- La noche del Metro, 1925.
- ¡Achanta que te conviene!, 1925.
- El truco de Wenceslao, 1926.
- ¡Qué Colón!, 1926.
- ¡Vamos a Romea!, 1926.
- Se alquila un cuarto, 1925.
- Fernando el Santo, 1926.
- No se culpe a nadie de mi muerte, 1926.
- Una noche de primavera sin sueño (1927)
- El cadáver del señor García (1930)
- Usted tiene ojos de mujer fatal (1932)
- Angelina o el honor de un brigadier (renamed Angelina o un drama en 1880, 1934)
- Un adulterio decente (1935)
- Las cinco advertencias de Satanás (1935)
- Intimidades de Hollywood, 1935.
- La mujer y el automóvil, 1935.
- El baile, 1935.
- Morirse es un error (renamed Cuatro corazones con freno y marcha atrás, 1935)
- Cuatro corazones con freno y marcha atrás (1936)
- Carlo Monte en Monte Carlo (operetta with music by Jacinto Guerrero, 1939)
- Un marido de ida y vuelta (1939)
- Eloísa está debajo de un almendro (1940)
- Los ladrones somos gente honrada (1940)
- El amor sólo dura 2.000 metros (1941)
- Madre (el drama padre) (1941)
- Es peligroso asomarse al exterior (1942)
- Los habitantes de la casa deshabitada (1942)
- Blanca por fuera y Rosa por dentro (1943)
- Las siete vidas del gato (1943)
- A las seis en la esquina del bulevar (1943)
- Es peligroso asomarse al exterior (1945)
- Tú y yo somos tres (1945)
- El pañuelo de la dama errante (1945)
- El amor del gato y del perro (1945)
- Agua, aceite y gasolina (1946)
- El sexo débil ha hecho gimnasia (1946)
- Como mejor están las rubias es con patatas (1947)
- Los tigres escondidos en la alcoba (1949)

== See also ==
- Café Gijón, Madrid
- Café de las Salesas, Madrid

== Bibliography ==
- Ariza Viguera, M., Enrique Jardiel Poncela en la literatura humorística española, Fragua, 1973 (ISBN 84-7074-012-1).
- Conde Guerri, María José et al., El teatro de Enrique Jardiel Poncela, Caja de Ahorros y Monte de Piedad de Zaragoza, Aragón y Rioja, 1985 (ISBN 84-505-1279-4).
- Conde Guerri, María José, El teatro de Enrique Jardiel Poncela: aproximación crítica, Consejo Superior de Investigaciones Científicas, Madrid, 1981 (ISBN 84-00-04765-6).
- Congreso de Literatura Española Contemporánea (junio de 1992, Málaga), Jardiel Poncela: teatro, vanguardia y humor, actas del Sexto Congreso de Literatura Española Contemporánea, Universidad de Málaga, 10 al 13 de noviembre de 1992 (ISBN 84-7658-414-8).
- Escudero, Carmen, Nueva aproximación a la dramaturgia de Jardiel Poncela, Editum: Ediciones de la Universidad de Murcia, 1981 (ISBN 84-600-2383-4).
- Fernán Gómez, Fernando, El tiempo amarillo. Memorias 1943-1987, Debate, Madrid, 1990, t. II.
- Florez Diez, Rafael, Jardiel Poncela Ediciones y Publicaciones Españolas, 1969 (ISBN 84-7067-100-6).
- François, Cécile, Personaje femenino e intertextualidad paródica en la trilogía novelesca de Enrique Jardiel Poncela, Visor Libros, 2016 (ISBN 978-84-9895-185-1)
- François, Cécile, Enrique Jardiel Poncela et la rénovation de l'écriture romanesque à la fin des années 20, ANRT, 2005 (ISBN 2-284-04797-1)
- Gallud Jardiel, Enrique, Enrique Jardiel Poncela: la ajetreada vida de un maestro del humor, Espasa-Calpe, 2001 (ISBN 84-239-3897-2).
- Greco, Barbara, L'umorismo parodico di Enrique Jardiel Poncela: i romanzi, Alessandria, Edizioni dell'Orso, 2014 ([[International Standard Book Number|ISBN 978-88-6274-509-3]])
- Jardiel Poncela, Evangelina, Enrique Jardiel Poncela, mi padre, Biblioteca Nueva, 1999 (ISBN 84-7030-718-5).
- Nemencia Legás, María, Margarita Ramírez de Arellano Apellániz y Susana, Eloísa está debajo de un almendro, de Enrique Jardiel Poncela, Madrid (Comunidad Autónoma), Servicio de Documentación y Publicaciones, 2004 (ISBN 84-451-2623-7).
- Sánchez Castro, Marta: El humor en los autores de la „otra generación del 27“: Análisis lingüístico-contrastivo - Jardiel Poncela, Mihura, López Rubio y Neville. Frankfurt am Main: Peter Lang, 2007. ISBN 978-3-631-56395-3
- Valls, Fernando, y Roas Deus, David, Enrique Jardiel Poncela, Eneida, 2002 (ISBN 84-95427-11-7).
- Ventín Pereira, José Augusto, Los juglares radiofónicos del siglo XX: Jardiel Poncela, Universidad Complutense de Madrid, Instituto Universitario de la Comunicación Radiofónica, 1998 (ISBN 84-600-9472-3).
- Vida y obra de Enrique Jardiel Poncela Siglo Ilustrado, 1970 (ISBN 84-7253-033-7).
