= Rafael Gil =

Spanish film director and screenwriter

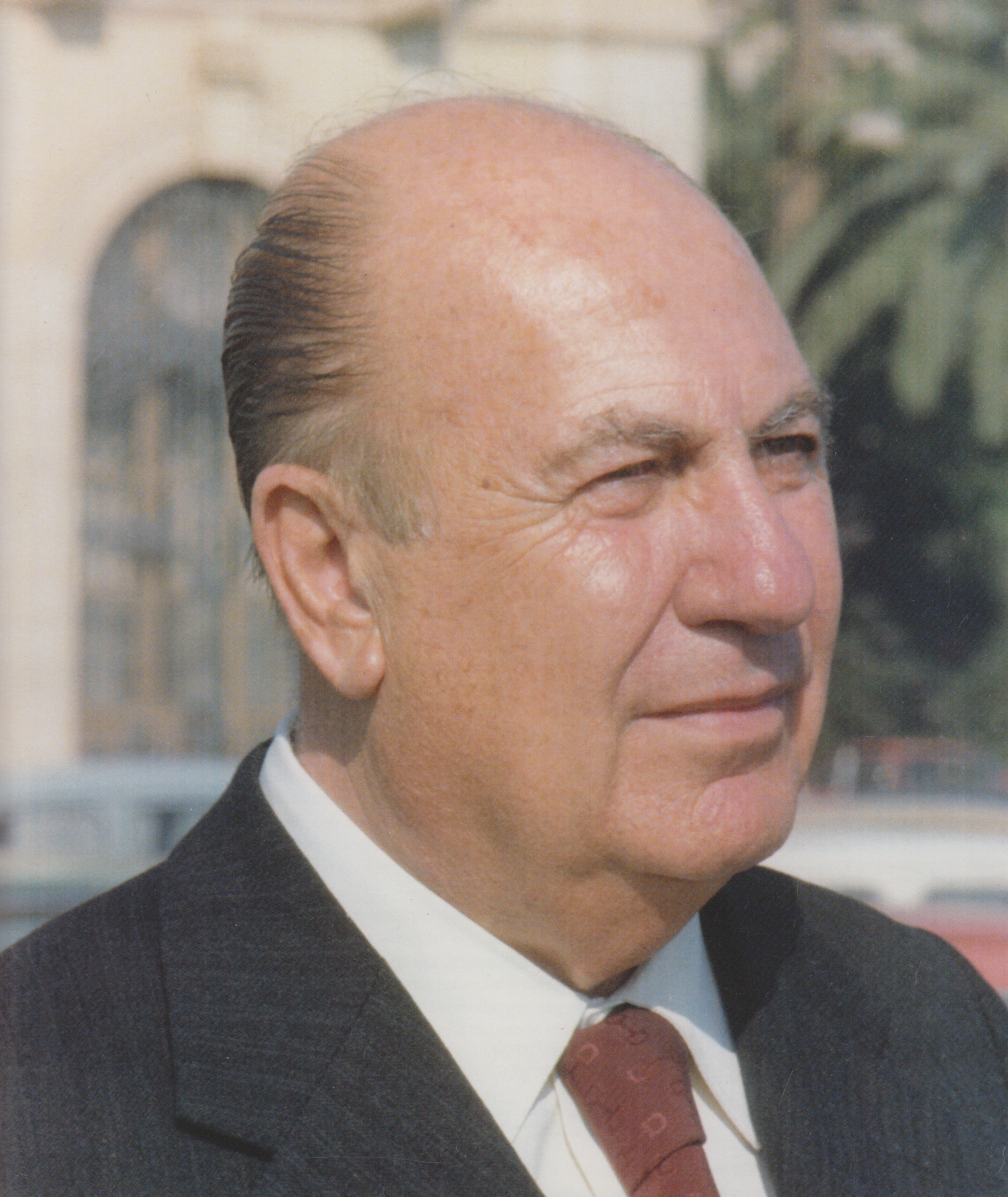
- Rafael Gil in 1970
- Born: 22 May 1913; Madrid, Spain
- Died: 10 July 1986 (aged 73); Madrid, Spain
- Occupations: Film director and screenwriter
- Years active: 1937–1984

Rafael Gil (22 May 1913 – 10 July 1986) was a Spanish film director and screenwriter. His film I Was a Parish Priest (Spanish: La guerra de Dios) (1953) won the Bronze Lion at the Venice Film Festival in 1953 and also won best film and best director at the San Sebastián International Film Festival. His film La noche del sábado (1950) was nominated for the Gold Lion at the 1950 Venice Film Festival and his film El beso de Judas (1954) was also nominated for the Gold Lion at the 1954 festival in Venice. His film Let's Make the Impossible! (1958) was nominated for the Golden Berlin Bear at the Berlin International Film Festival. He has won nine prizes of the National Syndicate of Spectacle of Spain.

Gil was a prominent director of the Franco era. His later works, often in collaboration with the Pro-Franco screenwriter and novelist Fernando Vizcaíno Casas, looked back nostalgically to the years of Franco's rule.

== Filmography ==
- The Queen's Flower Girl (1940) (screenplay only)
- The Man Who Wanted to Kill Himself (1942) (directorial debut)
- Journey to Nowhere (1942) (also screenplay)
- Traces of Light (1943) (also screenplay)
- Eloisa Is Under an Almond Tree (1943) (also screenplay)
- The Nail (1944) (also screenplay)
- Lessons in Good Love (1944)
- The Phantom and Dona Juanita (1945) (also screenplay)
- Thirsty Land (1945)
- The Prodigal Woman (1946) (also screenplay)
- The Holy Queen (1947) (also screenplay)
- Lady in Ermine (1947)
- The Faith (1947) (screenplay only)
- Don Quixote (1947; U.S. release 1949) (also screenplay)
- The Sunless Street (1948)
- Mare Nostrum (1948)
- Just Any Woman (1949)
- Apollo Theatre (1950)
- Saturday Night (1950)
- Our Lady of Fatima (1951)
- The Great Galeoto (1951)
- The Song of Sister Maria (1952)
- From Madrid to Heaven (1952) (also screenplay)
- I Was a Parish Priest. (1953)
- Judas' Kiss (1954)
- He Died Fifteen Years Ago (1954)
- The Cock Crow (1955)
- The Other Life of Captain Contreras (1955) (also screenplay)
- The Big Lie (1956)
- Miracle of the White Suit (1956)
- Let's Make the Impossible! (1958) (also screenplay)
- Luxury Cabin (1959) (also screenplay)
- College Boarding House (1959)
- Litri and His Shadow (1960)
- Green Harvest (1961) (screenplay only)
- Darling (1961) (screenplay only)
- You and Me Are Three (1962) (also screenplay)
- Queen of The Chantecler (1962)
- Rogelia (1962) (screenplay only)
- The Blackmailers (1963)
- Samba (1964) (screenplay only)
- Currito of the Cross (1965)
- Pedrito de Andía's New Life (1965) (also screenplay)
- Road to Rocío (1966)
- He's My Man! (1966)
- Another's Wife (1967) (also screenplay)
- The Sailor with Golden Fists (1968)
- Fruit of Temptation (1968)
- A Decent Adultery (1969)
- Blood in the Bullring (1969)
- The Man Who Wanted to Kill Himself (1970)
- The Locket (1970)
- Nothing Less Than a Real Man (1972) (also screenplay)
- The Green Envelope (1971)
- The Doubt (1972)
- The Guerrilla (1973)
- The King is the Best Mayor (1974)
- Death's Newlyweds (1975)
- The Good Days Lost (1975)
- Forget the Drums (1975)
- The Legion Like Women (1976)
- Two Men and Two Women Amongst Them (1977)
- Father Cami's Wedding (1979) (screenplay only)
- Spoiled Children (1980)
- And in the Third Year, He Rose Again (1980)
- Old Shirt to New Jacket (1982)
- The Autonomines (1984)
- The Cheerful Colsada Girls (1984)

== Bibliography ==
- Mira, Alberto. Historical Dictionary of Spanish Cinema. Scarecrow Press, 2010.
