= José María Prada =

Spanish actor (1925–1978)

- Born: José María Prada Oterino; 31 March 1925; Ocaña (Toledo), Spain
- Died: 13 August 1978 (aged 53); Bilbao (Biscay), Spain
- Occupation: Actor
- Years active: 1954–1978

José María Prada Oterino (31 March 1925 – 13 August 1978) was a Spanish film and television actor. He appeared in more than 80 films and television shows between 1954 and 1978.

== Partial filmography ==
- Doña María the Brave (1948) - Marqués de Santillana
- Comedians (1954) - Decorador
- Felices Pascuas (1954) - Barbero (uncredited)
- The Coyote (1955) - Barman
- The Coyote's Justice (1956) - Barman (uncredited)
- También hay cielo sobre el mar (1956) - Maestro
- The Rocket from Calabuch (1956) - Juan (voice, uncredited)
- Sonatas (1959) - Molinero
- Juanito (1960) - Dr. Ramiro
- La gran familia (1962) - Locutor de radio
- The Executioner (1963) - Vigilante con botella de champán
- The Fair of the Dove (1963)
- Aquella joven de blanco (1964) - Priest
- La Tía Tula (1964) - Sacerdote
- Faites vos jeux, mesdames (1965)
- The Art of Living (1965) - Gálvez
- Crimen de doble filo (1965) - Sixto Mendiola
- La familia y... uno más (1965) - (uncredited)
- La Barrera (1966) - Inspector
- La caza (1966) - Luis
- The Diabolical Dr. Z (1966) - Policeman (uncredited)
- La busca (1966) - Hornero
- Amador (1966) - Jesús
- Último encuentro (1967) - Álvaro
- El último sábado (1967)
- De cuerpo presente (1967) - Barlow
- Club de solteros (1967) - Don Cosme
- Javier y los invasores del espacio (1967)
- Oscuros sueños de agosto (1968) - Dr. Segura
- Los flamencos (1968) - Arturo
- Villa Rides (1968) - Major
- Persecución hasta Valencia (1968)
- Ditirambo (1969) - Jaime Normando
- Adiós cordera (1969) - Rufo
- Mónica Stop (1969) - Don Justo
- The Bloody Judge (1970) - Palafox (uncredited)
- Long Live the Bride and Groom (1970) - Pepito
- Cuadrilátero (1970) - Young Miranda
- Goya, a Story of Solitude (1971) - Sebastián
- Pancho Villa (1972) - Luis
- Cao-Xa (1973) - El sacerdote
- Corazón solitario (1973) - personaje de Jacques Dufilho (voice)
- Anna and the Wolves (1973) - José
- A Brief Vacation (1973) - Ciranni
- The Sibyl Cipher (1973)
- El asesino está entre los trece (1973) - Martin
- Todos los gritos del silencio (1975) - Mountain
- 7 morts sur ordonnance (1975) - Simon Mauvagne
- Léonor (1975)
- El poder del deseo (1975) - Sorribes
- La casa (1976) - Noel
- La lozana andaluza (1976) - Don Rodrigo
- El segundo poder (1976) - Córcoles
- El caballero de la mano en el pecho (1976)
- The Man Who Knew Love (1977) - Gran Inquisidor
- Niñas... al salón (1977) - Don Gustavo
- Pensione paura (1978) - Hotel guest
- Rebeldía (1978) - Don Ricardo
- Traffic Jam (1979) - Ricardo, Mercedes driver
- Mama Turns 100 (1979) - José (uncredited)
