= Currito of the Cross =

Currito of the Cross (Spanish:Currito de la Cruz) may refer to:

- Currito of the Cross (novel), a 1921 Spanish novel
- Currito of the Cross (1926 film), a silent film adaptation
- Currito of the Cross (1936 film), a film adaptation
- Currito of the Cross (1949 film), a film adaptation
- Currito of the Cross (1965 film), a film adaptation
