= Cristina Guzmán =

Cristina Guzmán may refer to:

- Cristina Guzmán (novel), a 1936 novel by Carmen de Icaza
- Cristina Guzmán (1943 film), a Spanish film adaptation directed by Gonzalo Delgrás
- Cristina Guzmán (telenovela), a 1966 Mexican television series
- Cristina Guzmán (1968 film), a Spanish film adaptation directed by Luis César Amadori
