= Icaza =

Icaza is a Spanish surname. People with this surname include:

== Icaza ==
- Francisco Icaza
- Emilio Álvarez Icaza
- María Elena Medina-Mora Icaza
- María Daniela Icaza
- Enrique Carral Icaza
- Alejandro Carabias Icaza
- Ana Villamil Icaza
- Eduardo Tomás Medina-Mora Icaza
- Jorge Icaza Coronel
- Ernesto Icaza Sánchez
- Michele Sensi-Contugi Ycaza

== de Icaza ==
- Amelia Denis de Icaza
- Amelia Denis de Icaza (corregimiento)
- Carmen de Icaza, 8th Baroness of Claret
- Francisco A. de Icaza
- Miguel de Icaza

== Ycaza ==
Ricardo Ycaza
