= Luis Ortega =

Luis Ortega may refer to:

- Luis Ortega (film director) (born 1980), Argentine film director and writer
- Luis Felipe Ortega (born 1966), Mexican artist
- Luis Agregado Ortega (born 1937), Filipino politician
- Luis García Ortega, Spanish actor and screenwriter
- Luis Ortega (footballer), a former coach of Hércules CF from 1968 to 1969
