= The Millions of Polichinela =

- Directed by: Gonzalo Delgrás
- Written by: Gonzalo Delgrás
- Starring: Marta Santaolalla; Luis Peña; Manuel Luna
- Cinematography: Willy Goldberger
- Music by: José Ruiz de Azagra
- Production company: CIFESA
- Distributed by: CIFESA
- Release date: 5 November 1941
- Running time: 80 minutes
- Country: Spain
- Language: Spanish

The Millions of Polichinela (Spanish:Los millones de Polichinela) is a 1941 Spanish black-and-white film directed by Gonzalo Delgrás and starring Marta Santaolalla, Luis Peña and Manuel Luna.

The film's art direction was by Pierre Schild.

== Cast ==
- Isabel de Pomés
- María Luisa Gerona
- Manuel González
- Manuel Luna
- Luis Peña
- Margarita Robles
- Marta Santaolalla
- Felisa Torres

== Bibliography ==
- Àngel Comas. Diccionari de llargmetratges: el cinema a Catalunya durant la Segona República, la Guerra Civil i el franquisme, (1930-1975). Cossetània Edicions, 2005.
