= The Complete Idiot =

The Complete Idiot (Spanish: La tonta del bote) may refer to:

- The Complete Idiot (1939 film), a Spanish comedy film
- The Complete Idiot (1970 film), a Spanish comedy film
