= Road to Rocío =

- Spanish film poster
- Spanish: Camino del Rocío
- Directed by: Rafael Gil
- Written by: Luis de Diego; Rafael Gil; José López Rubio; Alejandro Pérez Lugín (novel); José Andrés Vázquez (novel)
- Starring: Carmen Sevilla; Francisco Rabal; Arturo Fernández
- Cinematography: José F. Aguayo
- Edited by: José Luis Matesanz
- Music by: Augusto Algueró
- Production companies: Cesáreo González Producciones Cinematográficas; Coral Producciones Cinematográficas
- Distributed by: Paramount Films de España
- Release date: 5 December 1966
- Running time: 91 minutes
- Country: Spain
- Language: Spanish

Road to Rocío (Spanish: Camino del Rocío) is a 1966 Spanish musical film directed by Rafael Gil and starring Carmen Sevilla, Francisco Rabal and Arturo Fernández. It was the third version of the story to be filmed following The White Dove (1942) and It Happened in Seville (1955).

The film's sets were designed by Enrique Alarcón.

== Cast ==
- Carmen Sevilla as Esperanza Aguilar
- Francisco Rabal as José Antonio
- Arturo Fernández as Alberto Echeve
- Guillermo Marín as Fernando Aguilar
- Concha Goyanes as Mª Jesús Aguilar
- María Luisa Ponte as Martina
- Sancho Gracia as Médico
- Robert Royal as Robert Burton
- Antonia Imperio as La Guadaira
- José Orjas as administrator
- Julia Caba Alba as Rosa
- Alicia Hermida as Setefilla
