= Juan Simón's Daughter =

Juan Simón's Daughter may refer to:

- Juan Simón's Daughter (1935 film), a 1935 Spanish musical drama film
- Juan Simón's Daughter (1957 film), a 1957 Spanish musical drama film
