= Cristina Guzmán (novel) =

1936 novel by Carmen de Icaza

- 1939 edition
- Author: Carmen de Icaza
- Language: Spanish
- Genre: Drama; Romance
- Publication date: 1936
- Publication place: Spain
- Media type: Print

Cristina Guzmán, Foreign Language Teacher (Spanish:Cristina Guzmán, profesora de idiomas) is a 1936 novel by the Spanish writer Carmen de Icaza. A young single mother who has fallen on hard times, uses her skill with languages to become a teacher in a wealthy household. The work combined both feminist and conservative themes.

== Adaptations ==
In 1943, it was turned into a Spanish film Cristina Guzmán directed by Gonzalo Delgrás. The film was remade in 1968, directed by Luis César Amadori. There were also stage versions, as well as a 1966 Mexican television version.

== Bibliography ==
- Maureen Ihrie & Salvador Oropesa. World Literature in Spanish: An Encyclopedia: An Encyclopedia. ABC-CLIO, 20 Oct 2011.
