= Lina Yegros =

Spanish film actress

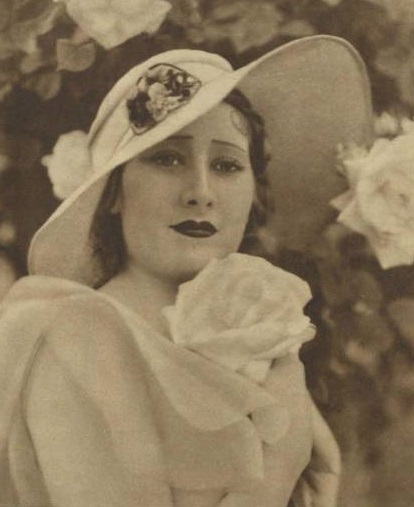
- Born: 6 December 1914; Madrid, Spain
- Died: 19 May 1978 (aged 63); Madrid, Spain
- Occupation: Actress
- Years active: 1934-1966 (film)

Lina Yegros (1914–1978) was a Spanish film actress.

== Biography ==
Lina Yegros was part of a military family and spent her childhood in Ceuta, Melilla, and the Canary Islands, until she settled permanently in Madrid in 1930.

At the age of sixteen, she joined the Juan Bonafé-Gelabert Company as an apprentice at the Teatro Alcázar in Madrid. There she met the actor Alfonso Albalat, whom she married, and went on tour throughout Latin America with Irene López de Heredia's newly formed company.

Back in Spain after the Latin American theater tour, she made her film debut with a supporting role in La bien pagada, followed by the successful Sor Angélica, and other melodramas such as El secreto de Ana María, El octavo mandamiento, ¿Quién me quiere a mí? and La millona.

The Spanish Civil War interrupted her upward trajectory, and at the end of the conflict she attempted to continue with her previous image in Manolenka, but the film's failure led her career to shift from melodrama to comedy, with moderately successful titles such as Un marido a precio fijo and Ni tuyo ni mío, both by Gonzalo Delgrás.

In the mid-1950s, he moved away from film, prioritizing theater among his activities. At the beginning of the following decade, he played supporting roles in films of all kinds, after which he gave up acting for good, passing away twelve years later.

At the 1976 National Entertainment Union Awards, she received the award for best female lifetime achievement.

== Selected filmography ==
- Stowaway on Board (1941)
- The Hired Husband (1942)
- Lady in Ermine (1947)
- Tempest (1949)
- La Virgen gitana (1951)
- Vertigo (1951)
- Malvaloca (1954)
- Darling (1961)
- The Twin Girls (1963)

== Bibliography ==
- Bentley, Bernard. A Companion to Spanish Cinema. Boydell & Brewer 2008.
