= The Complete Idiot (1970 film) =

- Directed by: Juan de Orduña
- Written by: Pilar Millán Astray (play); Rafael J. Salvia; Eloy Herrera Santos; Margarita Robles
- Produced by: José Frade
- Starring: Lina Morgan; Arturo Fernández; Paca Gabaldón
- Cinematography: Antonio L. Ballesteros
- Edited by: Magdalena Pulido
- Music by: Alfonso Sáinz
- Production company: Atlántida Films
- Distributed by: Atlántida Films
- Release date: 28 May 1970
- Running time: 105 minutes
- Country: Spain
- Language: Spanish

The Complete Idiot (Spanish: La tonta del bote) is a 1970 Spanish comedy film directed by Juan de Orduña and starring Lina Morgan, Arturo Fernández and Paca Gabaldón. It is a remake of the 1939 film of the same title.

== Cast ==
- Lina Morgan as Susana
- Arturo Fernández as Felipe
- Paca Gabaldón as Asunta
- José Sacristán as Narciso
- Marisol Ayuso as Trini
- Antonio Durán as Cipriano
- Luis Varela as Lorito
- Tony Soler as Numancia
- Antonio Casal as Don Ambrosio
- Tomás Blanco as Basilio
- Roberto Rey
- David Areu
- Félix Dafauce
- María Asquerino as Engracia
- Manena Algora
- Carmen Martínez Sierra as Clienta de la prenderia 1
- José García Calderón
- Tania Ballester
- María Isbert as Clienta de la prenderia 2
- Josefina Villalta
- Juan Amigo
- Sansona Siglo XX as Clienta de la corseteria
- Manuel Guitián
- Luis Frutos

== Bibliography ==
- Bentley, Bernard. A Companion to Spanish Cinema. Boydell & Brewer 2008.
