= Women's education in Francoist Spain =

Overview of the education of women in Francoist Spain

Women's education in Francoist Spain was based around the belief that women lacked the same intellectual abilities as men and that education should prepare women for lives in the home as wives and mothers.

Literacy rates were low for Spanish women. During the late 1800s and early 1900s, there were few economic pressures on Spain to encourage women's literacy. Rates largely remained unchanged except for a baseline boost during the Second Republic and the Spanish Civil War. The rate did not hit 90% for women until after the end of the dictatorship.

Primary education for women focused on girls' future roles in the home. Reforms in 1945 worked to reinforce this, in particular by making all education segregated by sex and requiring compulsory attendance. By 1954, 33% of all primary school students would be girls. During the Franco period, high school was no longer an extension of primary school. This meant that only girls who persevered could complete their high school education for an opportunity to attend university.

University opportunities were limited for women, as only two careers required a university education, and legal and diplomatic careers were not an option. Women made up only 8.8% of all university students in 1936, and this number would only climb to 23.4% by 1960. Women did not make up more than 50% of all university students until after the collapse of the regime.

== National ideology and policy implementation ==
Francoist ideology held that biologically, women did not have the same intellectual capacity as men. This belief was used to justify discrimination against women. The Franco period represented an end of a period of innovation and revolutionary reforms in Spanish society, which impacted many areas including education. Gregorio Marañón was an influential doctor, cited often by the Franco regime. He believed that education for women was not important, that the only thing a woman should learn was how to support her husband and live in happy co-existence with him while performing her biological role of becoming a mother and thus serving the state's interests. With the backing of these ideas, the regime's primary focus was on educating men.

One of women's roles in Francoist Spain was to educate Spanish children to prevent them from becoming maleducados. The Women's Section promoted the idea that the only people who could educate Spain's youngsters. The impact of this was that Sección Femenina encouraged women into secondary and university education so they could impart knowledge to the next generation. This could become problematic at times as there was a fine line in Falangist thinking between seeking education for practical reasons and seeking knowledge for the sake of knowledge in the vein of Second Republic feminists.

Sección Feminina and the Catholic Church had conflicting viewpoints on women and physical activity. Sección Feminina actively encouraged women's sports and women's physical fitness, while the Catholic Church opposed it.

Seminario de Estudios Sociólogics sobre la Mujer was created in 1960. The liberal women's Catholic organization's purpose was end discrimination in education and prepare women to enter the wider Spanish society as members of the workforce, and had connections to 1960s and 1970s Spanish Women's Movement thanks to members like María, Condesa de Campo Alange. It became less important as later Spanish feminism rejected a Catholic-based model.

The 1970 Education Act guaranteed a free education for all Spanish citizens, irrespective of gender. The General law of Education and Financing of the Educational Reform of 1970 provided greater opportunities to women, regardless of their social class across all levels of Spanish education.

With the new Spanish Constitution of 1978, education was guaranteed as a right for all Spaniards. The end of the Franco period saw a demand in many new services from the state as a result of previous suppression of these needs by the regime. This included areas of education.

== Literacy ==
During the early 1900s, women's literacy rates tended to be more constant and unchanging compared to men because literate men were much more likely to leave the rural countryside for the big city, depleting smaller rural settlements and lowering male literacy rates. Women were much less likely to migrate to other parts of Spain in this period. Economic demands for an increase in women's literacy rates improvement were also not present in the period between 1860 and 1910 in industries such as education, railways, religion, capital markets and the mining industry. Only in 1910 and only in the railway industry would there be an economic model that necessitated or influenced more women becoming literate. The inverse was true for men, with multiple industries having needs for a literate male population, which resulted in marked increased in male literacy over the same period.

Following the end of the Second Republic and the Spanish Civil War, there was a stagnation in matriculation and literacy rates for Spanish women. The literacy rate for women was 67% in 1935. The rate had increased to 77% in 1940. It improved more by 1970, with a rate of 88%.

Literacy rates for both men and women in Spain were adversely affected by a number of factors in the early regime period. During the late 1930s, the Francoist government forced a number of bookstores to close because of their supposed connections to liberalism of the Spanish Republic. During the 1940s, there was a paper shortage, which resulted in a major drop in the number of available printed publications. During the 1960s, publishers were afraid to take risks in printing many new novels out of fear of regime interference, even when the established risks were low.

National Literacy Campaign (Decree 24/07/1963) was primarily aimed at assisted men to read in order to increase their productivity in the workforce. As women were not seen as important for increasing entrepreneurship in Spain, the literacy program was largely not aimed at them.

Issues of women's literacy rates trailing that of men would continue well into the period following the establishment of the new Spanish constitution in 1978. By the 2010s, most of the illiterate women were older and, compared to their relative representation in the broader Spanish population, many were Roma. These high rates in post-Franco rate were a result of the regime failing to continue educational policies enacted by the Second Republic. This post-Franco period saw efforts across regional, but not central, governments to provide adult education with a focus on education and supporting adults who failed to matriculate. The post-Franco period saw Spain have some of the highest secondary education drop out rates in the whole of the European Union, with the number of women drop outs being twice the number of their male counterparts.

Literacy rate percentages in Spain from 1800 to 2010 (Note: The methods of counting vary and are not consistent. When multiple sources are used, a range is used instead of an exact number to account for the difference.)
Year	Women's literacy rate	Men's	Total population	ref
1820			20	
1870			30	
1900	34 - 50	54.3	43.8	
1910	42.4	62.9	49.69 - 52.2	
1920	52.9	70.1	57.12 - 61.2	
1930	66.3	83.0	68.87 - 74.4	
1935	67			
1940	71.6	76.9	76.83 - 82.8	
1950	81.7		82.66	
1960	85.2 - 92.1	92.7	86.36 - 88.8	
1970	88		91.20	
1980			93.64	
1981	91.1	96.4	92.8 - 93.7	
1990			96.72	
1991			96.49	
2004			97.165	
2005			97.75	
2007			97.938	
2008			97.630	
2009			97.679	
2010			97.748	

== Primary education ==
Education for women focused on girls future roles in the home. First, second and third grade girls all had lessons on bathroom, living room and kitchen arrangement and tidiness. Girls were also taught to maintain their spaces in the classroom and school, with desks, notes and books all being organized. Lessons for girls also discussed the virtue of silence, emphasizing under which circumstances it was appropriate for girls and women to make themselves visible. This included acts such as laughing, sneezing and expressing pain. These lessons were part of a national curriculum during the 1950s that emphasized True Catholic Womanhood.

On 1 May 1939, Franco banned co-education in schools, requiring all classes to be gender segregated. Many Republican teachers were also imprisoned, killed or forced into exile. Francoist thinker Onesimo Redondo said of co-education, "coeducation is a chapter of Jewish action against the free nations, a crime against the health of the people, who must punish with their heads the responsible traitors." (Spanish: “la coeducación como un capítulo de acción judía contra las naciones libres, un delito contra la salud del pueblo, que deben penar con sus cabezas los traidores responsables”) The purpose of single-sex education was to limit the educational opportunities for girls and women.

Reforms were made to primary school education in 1945, with the goal of bringing students into political alignment with the state and of ensuring social stability. The Elementary Education Act of 1945 was an important change from the last nineteenth century pedagogy previously used in schools. It was created specifically for the purpose of furthering gender roles by indoctrinating children in these roles at a young age. Girls were taught at this age that their role was to become perfect housewives, that one of their most important roles was to always remain faithful to their husbands, and that they should always delegate to and defer to men. Girls were taught that their future careers were to be middle-class housewives. Any other career option would be dishonorable to her family. The Elementary Education Act of 1945 included a set of principles to be implemented in the curriculum that integrated religious, patriotic and nationalism. Article 11 of the 1945 addressed the education of girls, saying "the feminine primary education will prepare especially for domestic household, crafts and industry life." The subjects for girls included in the curriculum for girls: housework, cooking, sewing, gardening, nursing and childcare for the care of children. Primary education was divided into two stages, the first from 6 to 10 years and the second from 10 to 12 years old. Importantly, the new curriculum was sex segregated, with girls being taught their place was home in the home and being given a skill set for that. The Catholic Church was placed in charge of the curriculum in this system, in both private and state run schools. This reform included a requirement that all children had compulsory school attendance from the ages of 6 to 12 and public schools were to receive government subsidies. The Franco government though did not require the state to establish educational facilities in more rural areas as they claimed they lacked funding to do so, which left the Catholic Church and other private organizations in charge of education delivery. Classrooms had pictures of Franco and José Antonio Primo de Rivera. Primary schools started the day with hoisting the Spanish flag, and singing nationalist songs like El cara al sol. National holidays included El día de la victoria, el 18 de Julio, La fiesta de la raza and Día de la Hispanidad. In 1956, Spain and the Vatican signed a Concordat. Article 26 of this agreement said, "All the educational centers, of any order and degree, are state or not state, the education will be adjusted to the principles of the dogma and the moral of the Catholic Church." While educational reforms took place in 1970, co-education was not an option as the Catholic Church was opposed to the idea. The Spanish Federation of Religious of the Teaching released a statement which said, "The moral risks are great. The church is not opposed to a coexistence of sex, but to easily replace a legitimate community by a promiscuity of a tendentiously egalitarian nature." Girls were guaranteed by law an education equal to that of boys.

Physical education was a component of primary education. A curriculum guide by Sección Feminina said of the subject that its purpose was, "(...) to get women to benefit from the effects of this activity, having a spiritual background and considering the goal of perfecting the body, so that it can serve the interests of the soul that is contained in it (having children and caring for of the family)." It explained this further, stating, "Hygiene, gymnastics and sports make each one of us that healthy and morally clean woman that the State wants to be the mother of her men of the future."

33% of primary school students were female in 1954. In this period, middle class girls were taught at Catholic affiliated schools. At the same time, their working class contemporaries were taught in government run schools while girls in rural Spain were largely left uneducated. From 1966 to 1977, the number of primary school students increased from 4 million to 8 million. Half of these children were girls. During the 1960s and 1970s, the Catholic Church was the biggest and most important educator of girls in primary and secondary education. Despite the increasingly secular society, the Church remained in this position as primary educator.

In the democratic transition period, a move was made to desegregate schools along gender lines.

Primary school attendance totals and percentages
Year	All students	Population aged 5 - 14 years	Percentage enrolled	% female of total student population	ref
1910	1600000	4419000	36.2		
1920	1950000	4639000	42.0		
1930	2598000	4876000	53.3		
1940	3012000	5501000	54.7		
1950	2791000	4762000	58.6		
1960	3387000	5378000	63.0	50	
1970	4763000	6610000	76.2		

== Secondary education ==
For most girls in Spain, middle school and high school were not realistic expectations.

In 1926, the bachillerato was officially recognized as a high school level, with two parts being composed of three year cycles. This reform was in part a result of girls seeking further educational opportunities both in high school and at the university level. Following the war, changes were made to undo the system established by various political and ideological entities during the Second Spanish Republic. This included major reforms in 1938 to the secondary education system, with the intention of making high schools into feeder programs for Spanish universities. High school would no longer be treated as an extension of primary school. The reforms meant high school became seven years in length, terminating in an exam required to graduate. The concept of middle school also entered the Spanish educational system, at which point Spanish girls were generally encouraged to drop out. Unless girls could persevere, they would not go on to high school or get opportunities to attend universities. This was because women's roles were in the household. Young girls from working-class backgrounds were particularly disadvantaged as there were fewer opportunities for them. 1941 saw legislation that banned sex education, with punishments attached for teaching it.

While musical education for boys was largely just learning of patriotic songs in the 1940s, girls in secondary education had music theory classes, learned popular songs and received an extensive music education. Patriotic songs were sometimes neglected but never mocked as part of this women's music education. Textbooks of this period wrote women out of history, except where they reinforced women's roles as mothers. The Female Labor Baccalaureate was created in 1957 as an adaption of the 1953 Labor Baccalaureate. This secondary education credential was an alternative to university for girls.

The law was changed in Spain in 1964 to require children to attend school until they were fourteen years old. Prior to that, the age had been twelve, set in 1909. Despite this change, the government did little to provide additional resources to assist the education system to afford this, nor did it make economic changes to prevent children from entering the workforce at an early age. Changes in the law in 1970 confirmed that education was compulsory until age 14.

It was not until near the close of the century that the percentage of girls in Spanish secondary education would surpass that of boys.

Enrollment percentages in secondary education
Year	% girls	% boys	ref
1900–1901	0.13	99.87	
1939–1940	36	66	
1940–1941	35.9	64.1	
1944–1945	35	65	
1950–1951	35.2	64.8	
1959–1960	45.6	54.4	
1960–1961	38.3	61.7	
1964-1965	45.12	54.88	
1970–1971	45.7	54.3	
1975–1976	45.6 - 50.0	50.0	
1999–2000	55.1	44.9	

== University education ==
With the Roman Catholic Church becoming the most important voice in university education, the Franco period saw universities become even more of an almost exclusively male domain. Scholarship in this period rejected women and femininity. Despite this, university education was the first time that men and women would be in co-educational settings.

During the Franco period, there were two jobs open to women that necessitated a university education. They were nursing, teaching and childcare. Legal and diplomatic careers barred women access to them by law, and consequently there were no university programs to support women in these areas in the 1940s and 1950s. Consequently, the most popular degrees were in Pharmacy, Philosophy and Letters, Education Sciences, Philology, Geography and History. The least popular subjects for girls in the 1940s and 1950s were Chemistry, Law, Medicine, and Veterinary Science.

The number of female university students in Spain in 1900 was only 9 nationwide, a rate of only one female student per every 15,000 male students in Spain. This had increased by 1919, this number had increased to 439, though they represented only 2% of the total university student population. The numbers grew dramatically, with 1,681 female university students by 1927 as a result of reforms made the previous year. The number had increased to 2,588 by 1936. The percentage of women among all university students in 1900 was 0.05% compared to 8.8% in 1936. While there were only 22,000 women in Spanish universities in 1960, by 1977, there were 261,000. While only 5% of university students were women in 1925, the percentage had jumped to 36% by 1971.

1926 reforms made during the Dictatorship of Primo de Rivera to the university system were in part a result of women demanding access to increased educational opportunities and to a university education. Courses were four years long, with the last two years involving specialization in the arts or the sciences.

Sección Femenina Sindicato Español Universitario became the primary organ for the government to mediate with the female university students population. They were not involved with encouraging and mostly supporting students, but about ensuring that university women remembered that their primary purpose was to become good wives and mothers.

The 1943 Ley de Ordenación Universitaria saw major reforms by the regime to university education in that saw knowledge acquisition made secondary to the promotion of patriotic values, with knowledge being shared needing to comport with these values and align with state promoted Catholic dogma. The law had thirteen chapters and 101 articles and provisions. Most importantly, this legislation made the Catholic Church the final arbitrator of all knowledge. Universities, under this law, became the cornerstone of developing a new, elite Spanish leadership. They also became transmitters of Spanish identity. Foreign and secular teachings were banned; education's purpose was to support the fatherland. Private universities were no longer to function autonomously, with the Federation of Catholic School Students being taken over by the Spanish University Syndicate. The 1943 lay required that all women at university complete six months of social service in state institutions under the guidance Sección Femenina's S.E.U supervision. This service was about reminding women of their role in the state.

Pilar Primo de Rivera attended the 1943 National Council of Spanish Education Service as the leader of the Women's Section. While an influential leader at the first edition of the National Council, she took pains to make sure her rhetoric was that which indicated a subordinate role because she was a woman. She said of women's education at the conference, "In regard to the role of women in the Party, we should unilaterally consider the condition of woman, and as a secondary thing her profession, work, et cetera, because even if she is a good worker, a good student, or a good teacher, principally, she is a woman, with a determined goal to accomplish, that, sometimes, accidentally, brings her to the University and to the workplace." She continued, arguing that women had never offered anything as they lacked intelligence and creativity, that they never discovered anything, and that they needed guidance from men to interpret information.

Sección Femenina was active in promoting both women to become writers and women's writers in general. This was a result of many of its most influential members being writers. They include Carmen de Icaza, Mercedes Formica, Mercedes Ballesteros, Eugenia Serrano and Ángeles Villarta. Many women writers got their first opportunity to write in part as a result of Sección Femenina publications. One Sección Femenina publication casually refers to these women, stating, "The university has seen the arrival of these girls who study happily, write novels and organize group activities and have overcome the traditional passive attitude of their predecessors as they follow the route of intelligent to become part of a minority in our nation's life."

The Spanish Association of University Women was created in 1953 in Oviedo, and then later that same year in Madrid. Delegations were then created in Barcelona in 1970, and Granada, Valencia, Santander, A Coruña and Valladolid in 1974 and 1975.

It was only after the end of the Franco period, near the beginning of the twenty first century that the number of women in Spanish universities would surpass that of men.

Women's enrollment nation at Spanish universities
Year	Total women enrolled	Percentage of all students university who were women	ref
1900	9	0.05	
1919	439	2	
1925		5	
1927	1681		
1936	2588	8.8	
1940		13.2	
1950		13.9 - 14.5	
1960	22,000	23.4 - 26	
1970		26.6	
1971	261,000	36	
1986		50.1	
2000		53.3	

== Vocational training and adult education ==
The 16 July 1949 Law of Middle and Professional Schools established specialized courses to support industries such as farming, industrial labor, mining and fishing. It also established professional courses for women. These educational opportunities were expanded with the 20 July 1955 Law of Professional Industrial Training, which saw women's opportunities increase with access to technical training in industries such as fishing and administration. Escuelas de Hogar taught tomestic activities like cooking and infant care.

During the 1960s, an emphasis was put on vocational training for women, especially in administrative roles as these types of positions were viewed as being compatible with the unique psychology of women.

The Women's Section of the Falanage offered classes for women. Their focus was on discrediting feminist discourse from the Second Republic and supporting the state in defining the role of women as wives and mothers. Out of a realization that not all women would marry, Sección Feminina also offered women classes designed to prepare them to immigrate to a new country.

In Jaén, almost all of the vocational educational opportunities for women were organized by Sección Feminina. Courses were in embroidery, cooking, domestic economy, childcare, and manual jobs. Advertisements for these courses said they were about "equipping future housewives with minimal knowledge to be tomorrow good wives, good mothers and ultimately good Spaniards."

== See also ==
- History of education in Spain
