= Rafael Calvo (actor, born 1886) =

Spanish actor (1886–1966)

Rafael Calvo Ruiz de Morales (Note: In this Spanish name, the first or paternal surname is Calvo and the second or maternal family name is Ruiz de Morales.) (25 November 1886 – 1966) was a Spanish actor of both stage and screen.

== Career ==
Rafael Calvo Ruiz de Morales was born into a distinguished theatrical family in Madrid on 25 November 1886. He began his acting career in the theatre company of his cousin, Ricardo Calvo Agostí, and also performed in Montevideo, Uruguay, and Buenos Aires, Argentina. In 1924, he made his motion-picture début in Para toda la vida, directed by Benito Perojo. By the time of his retirement, he had performed in 35 films. His last appearance was in Vittorio Cottafavi's 1957 film, Toro bravo.

He died in Madrid in 1966.

== Personal life ==
Calvo Ruiz de Morales's sons Rafael Luis Calvo and Eduardo Calvo were also actors.

== Filmography ==
Rafael Calvo Ruiz de Morales's films included:

- Para toda la vida (1924, dir. Benito Perojo)
- Currito de la Cruz (1926, dir. Alejandro Pérez Lugín)
- Pilar Guerra (1926, dir. José Buchs)
- La loca de la casa (1926, dir. Luis R. Alonso)
- El conde de Maravillas (1927, dir. José Buchs)
- La ilustre fregona (1927, dir. Armando Pou)
- Prim (1930, dir. José Buchs)
- L'assedio dell'Alcazar (1940, dir. Augusto Genina)
- Toro bravo (1957, dir. Vittorio Cottafavi)
