= Francisco Rabal =

Spanish actor (1926–2001)

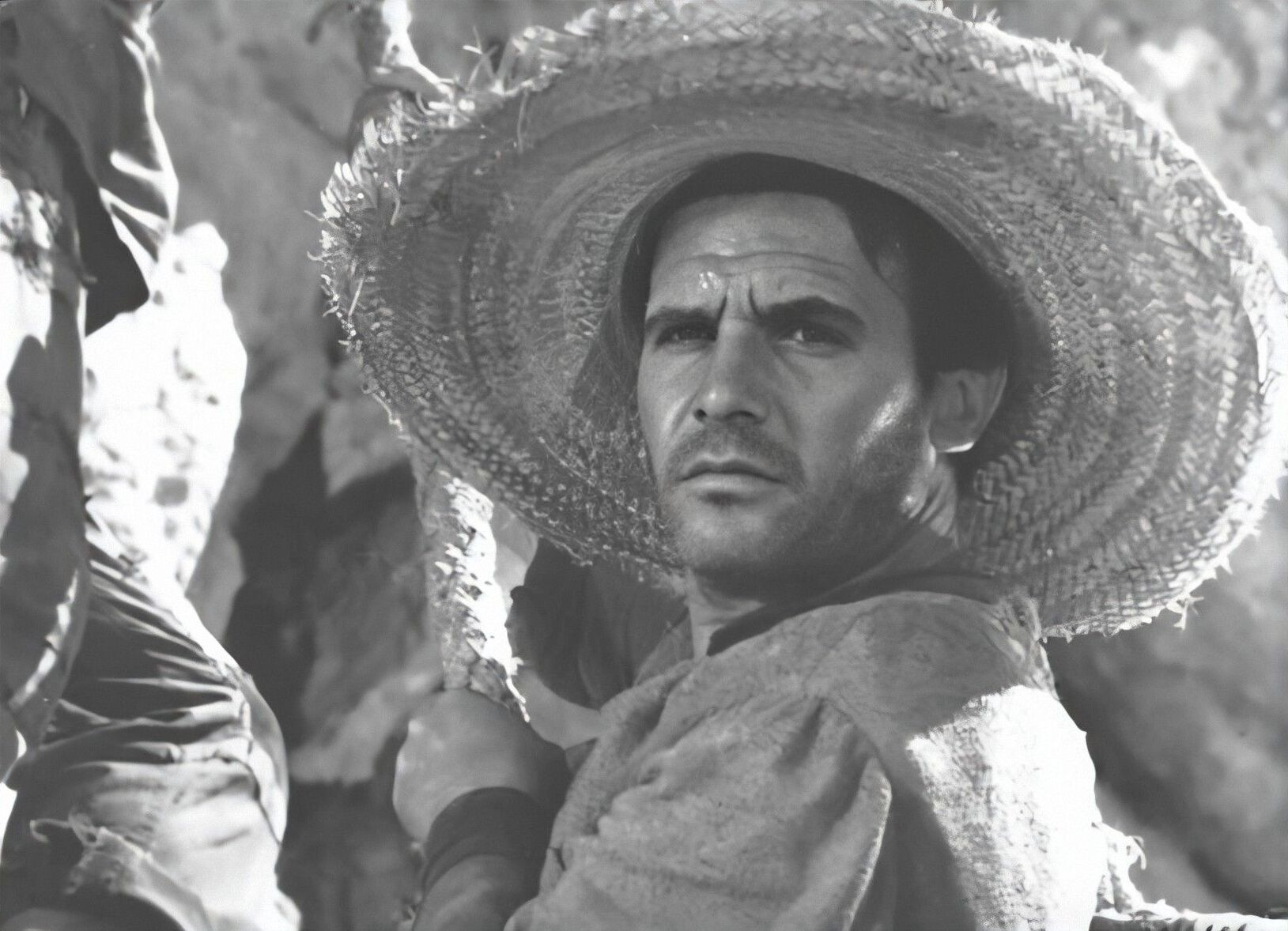
- Rabal in El hombre de la isla (1960)
- Born: Francisco Rabal Valera; 8 March 1926; Águilas, Murcia, Spain
- Died: 29 August 2001 (aged 75); Bordeaux, France
- Other name: Paco Rabal
- Years active: 1946–2001
- Spouse: Asunción Balaguer (m. 1950)
- Children: Teresa Rabal

Francisco Rabal Valera (8 March 1926 – 29 August 2001), popularly known as Paco Rabal, was a Spanish actor. His career spanned more than 200 film and television roles, between 1942 and 2001. He received numerous accolades both in Spain and abroad, including the Cannes Film Festival's Best Actor Award and the Goya Award for Best Actor.

Rabal was best known internationally for his collaborations with director Luis Buñuel, with Ronald Bergan writing "most of his other major roles he carried the heady, perverse whiff of the great surrealist director with him." He worked with many other notable directors, including Carlos Saura, Pedro Almodóvar, William Friedkin, Michelangelo Antonioni, Claude Chabrol, Luchino Visconti, and Gillo Pontecorvo.

One of Spain's most-loved and acclaimed actors during his lifetime, he also was known for his commitment to human rights and other social causes.

== Early life ==
Rabal was born in Águilas, a town in the south-western part of the province of Murcia. In 1936, after the Spanish Civil War broke out, Rabal and his family left Murcia and moved to Madrid. Young Francisco had to work as a street salesboy and in a chocolate factory. When he was 13 years old, he left school to work as an electrician at film studios Estudios Chamartín. Rabal got some sporadic jobs as an extra. Dámaso Alonso and other people advised him to try his luck with a career in theater.

During the following years, he got some roles in theater companies such as Lope de Vega or María Guerrero. It was there that he met actress Asunción Balaguer; they married in 1951 and remained together for the rest of Rabal's life. Their daughter, Teresa Rabal, is also an actress.

== Career ==
In 1947, Rabal got some regular jobs in theater. He used his full name, Francisco Rabal, as his stage name. However, the people who knew him always called him Paco Rabal (Paco is the familiar form for Francisco.) "Paco Rabal" became his unofficial stage name.

During the 1940s, Rabal began acting in movies as an extra, but it was not until 1950 that he was first cast in speaking roles, and played romantic leads and rogues. He starred in three films directed by Luis Buñuel - Nazarín (1959), Viridiana (1961) and Belle de jour (1967) - with whom he would develop a lifelong friendship.

He was named best actor by the Círculo de Escritores Cinematográficos for El hombre de la isla in 1962.

Rabal was William Friedkin's first choice to play the antagonist Alain Charnier in his 1971 film The French Connection. However, he could not remember the name of "that Spanish actor", only remembering that his name started with an 'F' and that he worked with Luis Buñuel. Mistakenly, his staff hired another Spanish actor, Fernando Rey. Friedkin later discovered that Rabal did not speak English or French, so he decided to keep Rey. Rabal had previously worked with Rey in Viridiana. Rabal did, however, work with Friedkin in the much less successful but Academy Award-nominated cult classic Sorcerer (1977), a remake of The Wages of Fear (1953).

Throughout his career, Rabal worked in France, Italy and Mexico with directors such as Gillo Pontecorvo, Michelangelo Antonioni, Luchino Visconti, Valerio Zurlini, Jacques Rivette, Alberto Lattuada and Silvano Agosti.

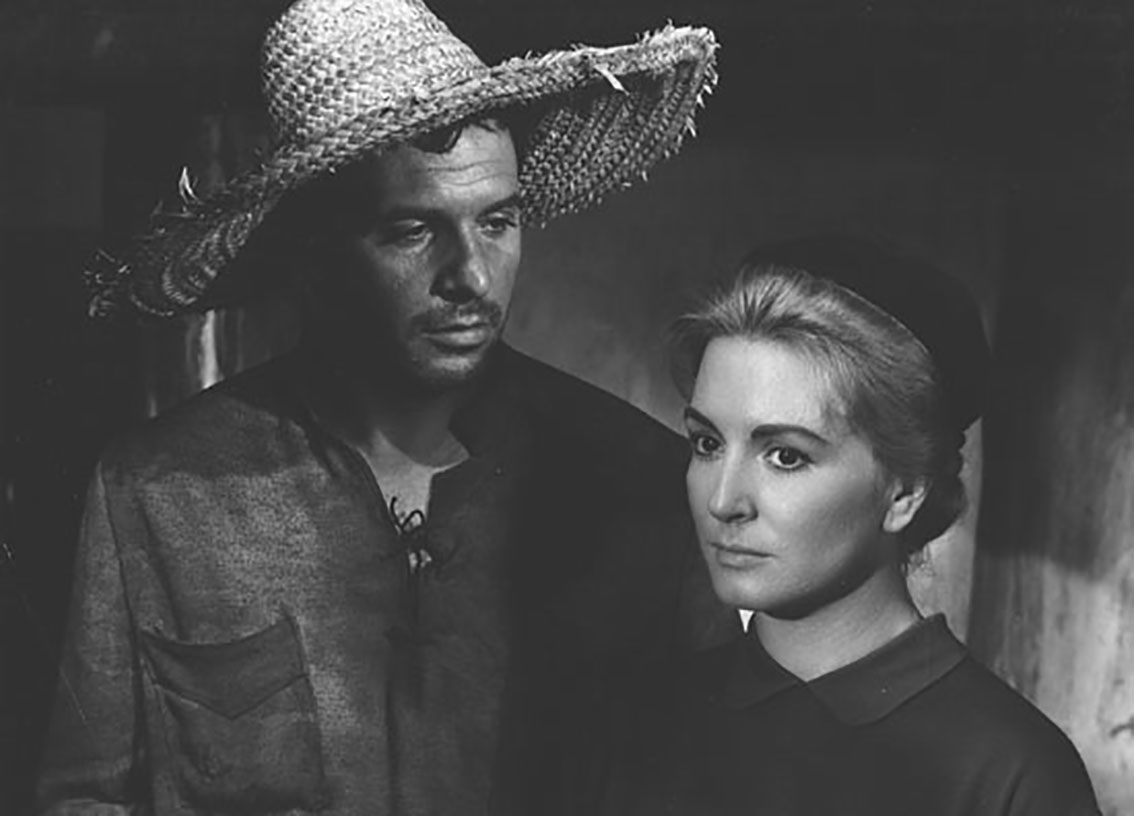
Rabal with Marga López in El hombre de la isla (1960)

It is widely considered that Rabal's best performances came after Francisco Franco's death in 1975. In the 1980s, Rabal starred in Los Santos Inocentes - winning the Award for Best Actor at the Cannes Film Festival - in El Disputado Voto del Señor Cayo and also in the TV series Juncal. In 1989, he was a member of the jury at the 39th Berlin International Film Festival. In 1999 he played the part of Francisco Goya in Carlos Saura's Goya en Burdeos, winning a Goya Award for Best Actor.

Rabal's final movie was Dagon, directed by Stuart Gordon. The film, which was released after Rabal's death in 2001, was dedicated to him. The dedication, which appears before the end credits, reads: "Dedicated to Francisco Rabal, a wonderful actor and even better human being."

== Death ==
Rabal died in 2001 from compensatory dilating emphysema while on an airplane travelling to Bordeaux, returning from having received an Award at the Montreal World Film Festival. His death happened only a few weeks before he was due to collect the lifetime Donostia Award at the San Sebastián International Film Festival. The award was accepted by his grandson, Liberto Rabal, also an actor.

== Legacy ==
Francisco Rabal is the only Spanish actor to have received an honoris causa doctoral degree from the University of Murcia. Murcia's Film Library and Cinematheque, Filmoteca Regional Francisco Rabal, created in 2004 as a meeting point for movie lovers, was named after him.

A square and the civic center in the town of Alpedrete are named after Rabal and his wife. In 2024, the city council, governed by the right-wing parties People's Party and Vox, announced plans to rename the venues, due to Rabal and his wife's membership in the Communist Party of Spain. The plan met widespread backlash, and was eventually cancelled.

== Selected filmography ==
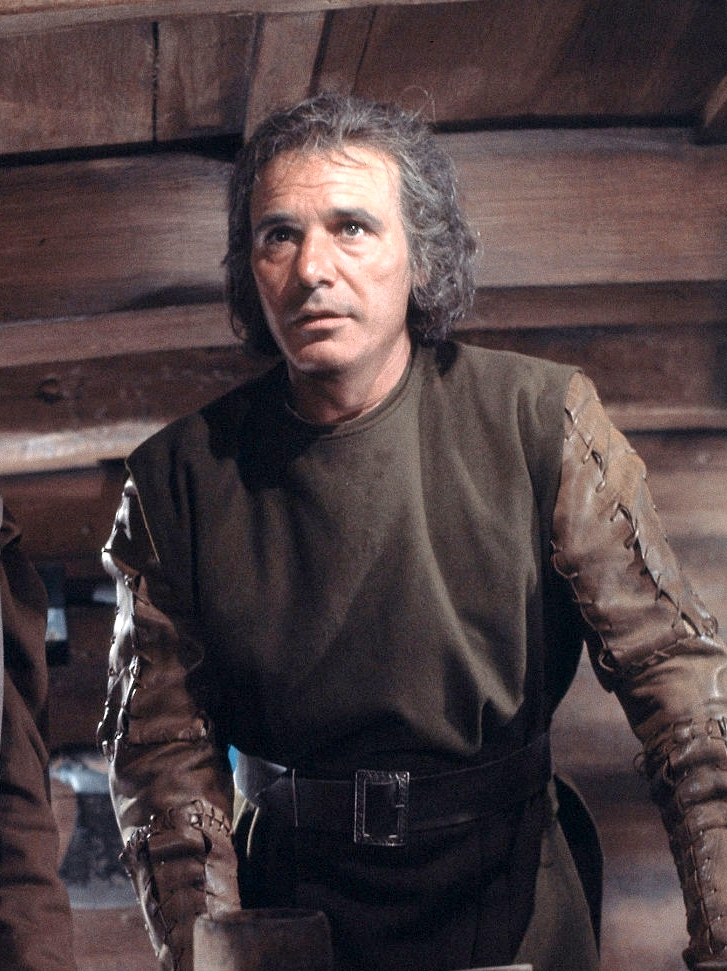
Rabal in the TV series Cristoforo Colombo (1968)

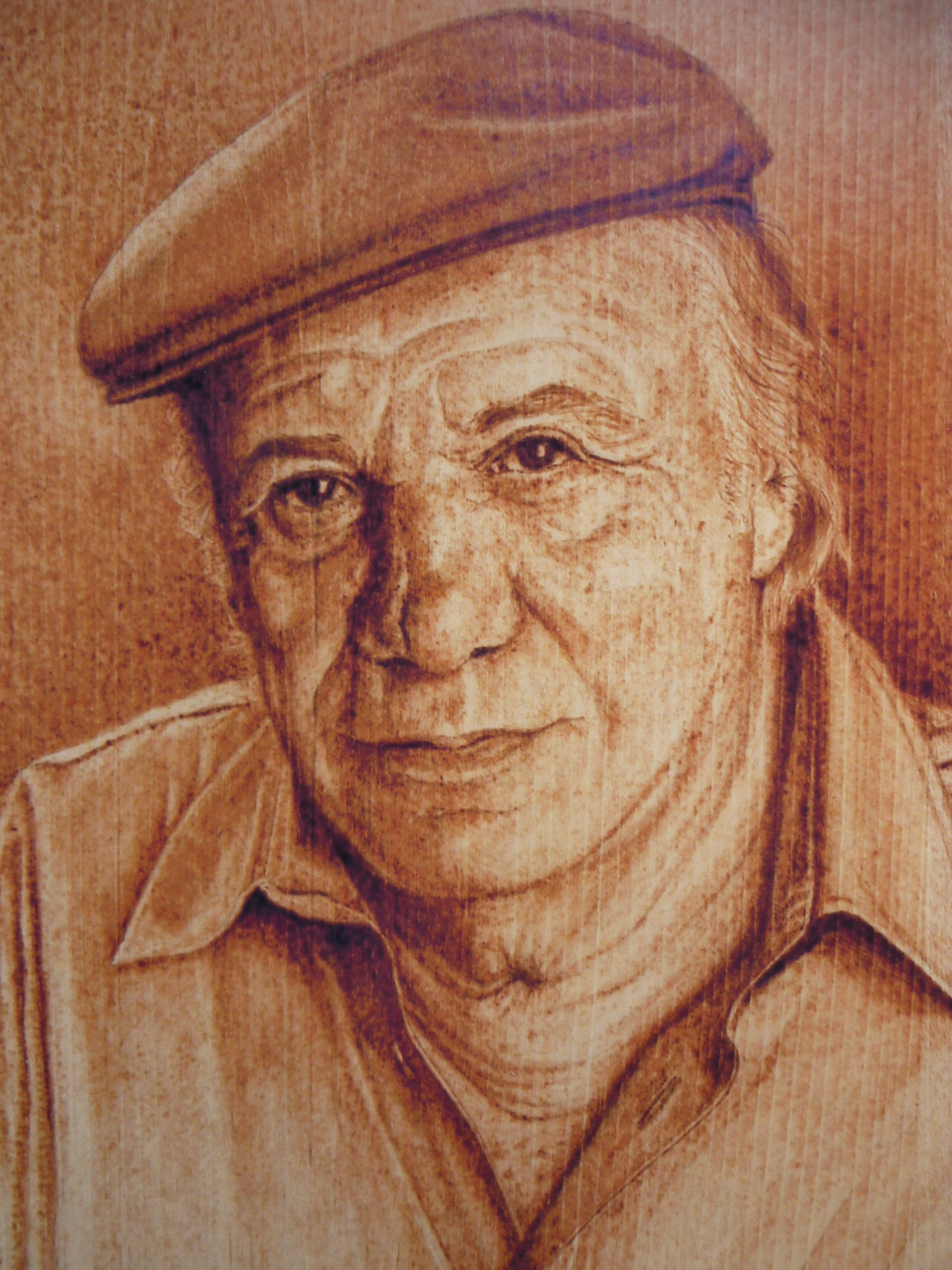
Rabal in a portrait made on wood in 2001

- La rueda de la vida (1942) - Bronquista de pelea en salón (uncredited)
- The Prodigal Woman (1946)
- El crimen de Pepe Conde (1946)
- Don Quijote de la Mancha (1947) - (uncredited)
- Alhucemas (1948) - Tostado (uncredited)
- Revelación (1948)
- The Honesty of the Lock (1950) - Ernesto
- María Antonia 'La Caramba' (1951)
- Doubt (1951) - Rafael Figueroa
- María Morena (1951) - El Sevillano
- Luna de sangre (1952) - Pedro
- The Song of Sister Maria (1952) - Tomás
- Perseguidos (1952)
- Hay un camino a la derecha (1953) - Miguel
- I Was a Parish Priest (1953) - Martín
- Judas' Kiss (1954) - Quinto Licinio
- All Is Possible in Granada (1954) - Fernando Ortega
- He Died Fifteen Years Ago (1954) - Diego
- Historias de la radio (1955) - Gabriel
- The Cock Crow (1955) - Padre Miller
- La pícara molinera (1955) - Cristóbal Paterna - el molinero
- Revelation (1955) - Sergio Gresky
- The Big Lie (1956) - César Neira
- Saranno uomini (1957) - Giacomo
- Amanecer en Puerta Oscura (1957) - Juan Cuenca
- Marisa la civetta (1957) - Antonio
- La grande strada azzurra (1957) - Salvatore
- Vengeance (1958) - Narrador (voice, uncredited)
- The Mighty Crusaders (1958) - Tancredi d'Altavilla
- L'amore più bello (1958) - Mario
- Night and Dawn (1958) - Pedro
- Los clarines del miedo (1958) - Aceituno
- Ten Ready Rifles (1959) - José Iribarren
- Nazarín (1959) - Padre Nazario
- Llegaron dos hombres (1959) - Superintendente
- Sonatas (1959) - Marqués Javier de Bradomín
- El hombre de la isla (1960) - Lorenzo 'El moro'
- Trío de damas (1960) - Alberto Sáinz Robledo
- Cavalcata selvaggia (1960)
- At Five in the Afternoon (1960) - Juan Reyes
- Azahares rojos (1961) - Arturo Gómez Mancera
- La sed (1961)
- Viridiana (1961) - Jorge
- La Mano en la trampa (1961) - Cristóbal Achával
- Tiro al piccione (1961) - Elia
- Hijo de Hombre (1961) - Vito Ribera - un famoso bandito siciliano
- L'Eclisse (1962) - Riccardo
- Setenta veces siete (1962) - Pascual / The Horsethief
- Fra Diavolo (1962) - Fra Diavolo
- Mathias Sandorf (1963) - Frédéric de Rotenbourg
- Noche de verano (1963) - Bernardo
- The Reunion (1963) - Alberto
- Autopsy of a Criminal (1963) - Carlos
- Le gros coup (1964) - Michel Arland
- Llanto por un bandido (1963) - José María 'El Tempranillo'
- L'autre femme (1964) - Zaylor
- Intimidad de los parques (1965)
- El Diablo también llora (1965) - Tomás
- Currito of the Cross (1965) - Manuel Carmona
- Legacy of the Incas (1965) - Gambusino
- Marie-Chantal contre le docteur Kha (1965) - Paco Castillo
- María Rosa (1965) - Marsal
- La Religieuse (1966) - Dom Morel
- Hoy como ayer (1966) - Ramón
- Road to Rocío (1966) - José Antonio
- Le Streghe (1967) - Paolo (Segment "Strega Bruciata Viva, La")
- Long Days of Vengeance (1967) - Sceriffo Douglas
- Belle de Jour (1967) - Hyppolite
- Cervantes (1967) - Rodrigo Cervantes
- Oscuros sueños de agosto (1968) - Julio
- Spain Again (1968) - Reportero (uncredited)
- Después del diluvio (1968) - Pedro
- Blood in the Bullring (1969) - Juan Carmona
- El Che Guevara (1968) - Che Guevara
- Cervantes (1968)
- A Decent Adultery (1969) - Conserje (uncredited)
- Simón Bolívar (1969) - gen. José Antonio Del Llano
- El largo día del águila (1969) - Martin Donovan
- Ann and Eve (1970) - Francesco
- Cutting Heads (1970) - Díaz II
- Goya, a Story of Solitude (1970) - Goya
- La grande scrofa nera (1971) - Il Medico
- El apartamento de la tentación (1971) - Hombre que se cruza con Julieta (uncredited)
- N.P. - Il segreto (1971) - engineer N.P.
- Las melancólicas (1971)
- Nothing Less Than a Real Man (1972) - Alejandro Gómez
- Laia (1972) - Quelot
- It Can Be Done Amigo (1972) - Franciscus
- Le soldat Laforêt (1972) - Paco
- Pianeta Venere (1972) - Party chauffer
- La colonna infame (1972) - Giacomo Mora - il barbiere
- The Guerrilla (1973) - El Cabrero
- La Leyenda del Alcalde de Zalamea (1973) - Pedro Crespo, Alcalde de Zalamea
- La otra imagen (1973)
- Counselor at Crime (1973) - Vincent Garofalo
- The Devil Is a Woman (1974) - Bishop Marquez
- Lola (1974) - Tío
- Tormento (1974) - Agustín Caballero
- Death Will Have Your Eyes (1974) - Il ricattatore
- Metralleta 'Stein' (1975) - Comisario Emilio Mendoza
- Cacique Bandeira (1975) - Azevedo Bandeira
- Faccia di spia (1975) - Mehdi Ben Barka
- Las bodas de Blanca (1975) - Antonio
- Attenti al buffone (1976) - Eminence
- The Sinner (1975) - 'Turco'
- Las largas vacaciones del 36 (1976) - El Maestro
- Emilia... parada y fonda (1976)
- The Desert of the Tartars (1976) - Marshal Tronk
- Sorcerer (1977) - Nilo
- I Am the Law (1977) - Il brigante Albanese
- Pensione paura (1978) - Marta's lover
- Yo soy mia (1978) - Padre di Orio
- El buscón (1979) - Mata
- Así como eres (1978) - Lorenzo
- Corleone (1978) - Don Giusto Provenzano
- Hunted City (1979) - Don Alfonso
- Ciao cialtroni! (1979)
- El buscón (1979) - Mata
- Under Siege (1980) - William Lombard
- The Rebel (1980) - Tony
- El gran secreto (1980) - Domingo
- Speed Driver (1980) - Esposito
- Nightmare City (1980) - Major Warren Holmes
- Buitres sobre la ciudad (1981) - Bender
- Reborn (1981) - Giacomo
- Sal Gorda (1982)
- La colmena (1982) - Ricardo Sorbedo
- Treasure of the Four Crowns (1983) - Sócrates
- Victòria! La gran aventura d'un poble (1983) - Coronel Márquez
- Truhanes (1983) - Ginés Jiménez Valera
- Victòria! 2: La disbauxa del 17 (1983) - Coronel Márquez
- Escapada Final (1983)
- Epílogo (1984) - Rocabruno
- Victòria! 3: El seny i la rauxa (1984) - Coronel Márquez
- Sal gorda (1984) - Gabino
- Los santos inocentes (1984) - Azarías
- Los zancos (1984) - Manuel
- Futuro imperfecto (1985)
- Padre nuestro (1985) - Abel
- Luces de Bohemia (1985) - Max Estrella
- The Old Music (1985) - Domingo Ferreiro
- Marbella, un golpe de cinco estrellas (1985) - Juan
- Los paraísos perdidos (1985) - El político anciano
- La hora bruja (1985) - César
- Escapada final (Scapegoat) (1985) - Comisario Cárdenas
- Camorra: Contacto en Nápoles (1985) - Guaglione
- Tiempo de silencio (1986) - Muecas
- El hermano bastardo de Dios (1986) - Rosendo
- El disputado voto del señor Cayo (1986) - Señor Cayo
- Divinas palabras (1987) - Pedro Gailo
- Gallego (1988) - Fabián
- A Time of Destiny (1988) - Jorge Larraneta
- El aire de un crimen (1988) - Coronel Olvera
- Torquemada (1989) - Torquemada
- Barroco (1989) - El Hispano
- La Blanca Paloma (1989) - Domingo
- ¡Átame! (1989) - Máximo Espejo
- Breath of Life (1990) - Il Gran Magro
- La taberna fantástica (1991)
- El hombre que perdió su sombra (1991) - Antonio
- L'autre (1991) - Simm
- Manuel, le fils emprunté (1991) - Alvarez
- La Lola se va a los puertos (1993) - Don Diego
- One Hundred and One Nights (1995) - La voix de Buñuel (voice)
- El palomo cojo (1995) - Tío Ricardo
- Así en el cielo como en la tierra (1995) - San Pedro
- Felicidades, Tovarich (1995) - Abuelo
- Oedipo alcalde (1996) - Tiresias
- Day and Night (1997) - Cristobal
- Airbag (1997) - Villambrosa
- Pequeños milagros (1997) - Don Francisco
- Pajarico (1997) - El Abuelo
- La novia de medianoche (1997) - Wenceslao Corredoira
- Water Easy Reach (1998)
- El evangelio de las maravillas (1998) - Papá Basilio
- Talk of Angels (1998) - Don Jorge
- Goya en Burdeos (1999) - Goya
- Tú qué harías por amor (1999) - Don Vicente
- Peixe-Lua (2000) - Tio Nini
- Divertimento (2000) - Bernardo Gabler
- Lázaro de Tormes (2001) - El Ciego
- Off to the Revolution by a 2CV (2001) - zio Enrique
- Dagon (2001; Final film before death) - Ezequiel
- Las noches de Constantinopla (2001) - Doña Eugenoia's brother
- El sueño del caimán (2001) - Anciano
- Torero, fra sogno e realtà (2001) - Narrator
- Zero/infinito (2002) - (voice) (final film role)
