= The Hired Husband =

- Directed by: Gonzalo Delgrás
- Written by: Luisa-María Linares (novel); Margarita Robles; Gonzalo Delgrás
- Starring: Rafael Durán; Lina Yegros
- Cinematography: Willy Goldberger
- Edited by: Margarita de Ochoa
- Production company: CIFESA
- Distributed by: CIFESA
- Release date: 4 April 1942
- Running time: 104 minutes
- Country: Spain
- Language: Spanish

The Hired Husband (Spanish: Un marido a precio fijo) is a 1942 Spanish comedy film directed by Gonzalo Delgrás and starring Rafael Durán and Lina Yegros. Its plot also has elements of melodrama.

== Plot ==
The protagonist, Estrella, is the goddaughter of the opulent king of synthetic shoe polish. In order to create marketing, Estrellita motivates the interest of the radio and newspapers. The millionaire leaves her boyfriend standing up in the middle of an argument, he is a bored-looking man in his forties, and she leaves him to travel to different countries in Europe. In a hotel she meets Eric whom she is to marry in twenty days. He leaves her and back home she proposes to a train robber to supplant her husband.

== Cast ==
- Pepe Blanco
- Ana María Campoy
- Rafael Durán as Miguel
- Juana Ferrer
- Leonor Fábregas
- Jorge Greiner
- Juana Mansó
- Manuel de Melero
- Juan Muñiz
- José Sanchíz
- Cristina Santaolalla
- Lily Vicenti
- Luis Villasiul
- Lina Yegros as Estrella

== Bibliography ==
- Labanyi, Jo & Pavlović, Tatjana. A Companion to Spanish Cinema. John Wiley & Sons, 2012.
