= Currito of the Cross (novel) =

1921 novel

- Author: Alejandro Pérez Lugín
- Original title: Currito de la Cruz
- Language: Spanish
- Publication date: 1921
- Publication place: Spain
- Media type: Print

Currito of the Cross (Spanish: Currito de la Cruz) is a 1921 novel by the Spanish writer Alejandro Pérez Lugín which portrays the rise of a young bullfighter.

The novel was made into a movie four times. Lugín himself directed a silent film adaptation in 1926. Fernando Delgado directed version in 1936, Luis Lucia directed a 1949 version, and Rafael Gil a 1965 version.

== Bibliography ==
- Labanyi, Jo & Pavlović, Tatjana. A Companion to Spanish Cinema. John Wiley & Sons, 2012.
