= Currito of the Cross (1926 film) =

1926 film

- Directed by: Alejandro Pérez Lugín
- Written by: Alejandro Pérez Lugín (novel)
- Produced by: Antonio Moriyón
- Starring: Jesús Tordesillas; Manuel González
- Cinematography: Enrique Blanco
- Edited by: Tomás Ysern
- Music by: Isaac Albeniz; Francisco Barbieri; Enric Granados
- Production company: Troya Film
- Release date: 12 January 1926
- Country: Spain
- Languages: Silent; Spanish intertitles

Currito of the Cross (Spanish: Currito de la Cruz) is a 1926 Spanish silent drama film directed by Alejandro Pérez Lugín and starring Jesús Tordesillas, Manuel González and Elisa Ruiz Romero. The film was adapted from Lugin's own 1921 novel of the same title, set in the bullfighting world. The novel has been made into films several times.

== Cast ==
- Jesús Tordesillas as Currito de la Cruz
- Manuel González as Manuel Carmona
- Elisa Ruiz Romero as Rocío
- Ana Adamuz as Sor María del Amor Hermoso
- Faustino Bretaño as Copita
- Domingo del Moral as Gazuza
- Elisa Sánchez as Teresa
- Cándida Suarez as Manuela 'La Gallega'
- Fernando Fresno as El 'Pintao'
- José Alba
- Ángel Alguacil
- Isabel Almarche as Otra gachí
- Señor Benítez
- Antonio Calvache as Romerita
- Rafael Calvo as Padre Almanzor
- José Ignacio Caro
- Manuel Centeno
- Miguel Contreras
- Gregorio Cruzada
- Barón de Kardy
- Juan Espantaleón
- Señorita Galcerán
- Galerín
- Carmen Larrabeiti as Una gachí
- Alejandro Navarro
- José Rico Cejudo
- Víctor Rojas
- Clotilde Romero as Rufina
- Duchess of Alba as herself
- Duchess of Dúrcal as herself
- José García 'El Algabeño' as himself
- Alexandre P. Moore as himself
- Queen Victoria Eugenia as herself

== Bibliography ==
- Goble, Alan. The Complete Index to Literary Sources in Film. Walter de Gruyter, 1999.
