= Kaulak =

Spanish photographer

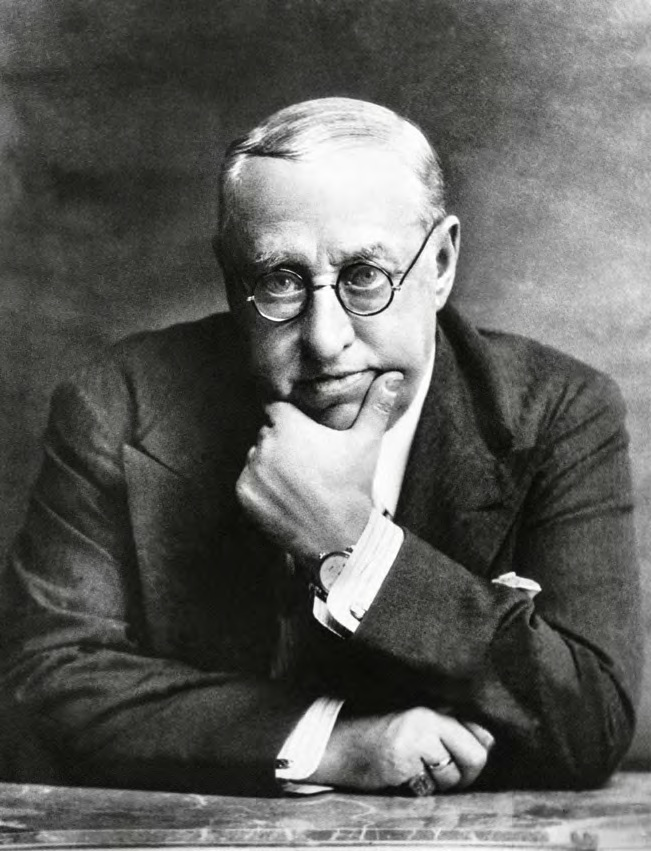
- Kâulak
- Born: 22 December 1862; Madrid, Spain
- Died: 13 September 1933 (aged 70); Madrid, Spain

Antonio Cánovas del Castillo y Vallejo, better known as Kaulak (22 December 1862 – 13 September 1933), was a Spanish photographer, art critic, editor and amateur painter. His uncle was prime minister Antonio Cánovas del Castillo, assassinated in 1897 by an anarchist, hence his use of a pseudonym; the meaning of which is unexplained, although the word appears to be of Basque origin.

== Biography ==
He was originally a lawyer, and held several public offices before deciding to devote himself to photography. This included high positions in the ministries of Interior and Justice, as well as holding a seat in the Cortes (legislature), representing the constituency of Cieza, in the early 1890s. He also served for a brief period as Civil Governor of the province of Málaga. During this time, he wrote art criticism for the illustrated version of La Correspondencia de España, and studied painting under the tutelage of Carlos de Haes; signing his works as "Vascano".

As for his photographic activity, he opposed pictorialism, which was the prevalent approach at the time, in favor of professional portraits, rendered in a "purist" manner. He eventually came to be known as the "Spanish Nadar". His portraits encompassed a wide range of notables, including prime ministers Antonio Maura and Eduardo Dato, writers such as José Echegaray, his fellow photographer, Luis Federico Guirao Girada, and the bullfighter Manuel Granero, as well as members of the Royal Family.

In 1901, he created the magazine, La Fotografía, which for many years served as the official organ of the Real Sociedad Fotográfica. He also collaborated with several other magazines, including Blanco y Negro and, in 1902, won a prize sponsored by that magazine, to provide illustrations for Doloras, a book of poems by Ramón de Campoamor y Campoosorio. They were later issued as postcards. He also created a series of postcards with the Swiss-born photographers, Adolfo Menet (1866–1927) and Oscar Hauser.

He opened the Kaulak Studios on the Calle de Alcalá in 1904, and immediately attracted an upper-class clientele. In 1912, he published a technical manual: La fotografía moderna. Manual compendiado de los conocimientos indispensables del fotógrafo, under his real name.

He died in Madrid, aged seventy, and was interred at Saint Isidore Cemetery. His studio was operated by his family, except for a period during the Spanish Civil War, and remained in business until 1989.

== Selected works ==
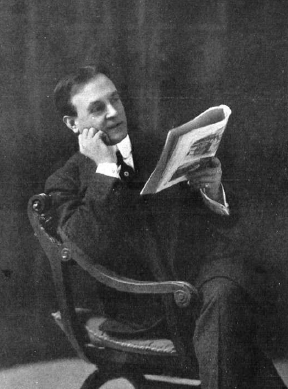
Enrique Borrás

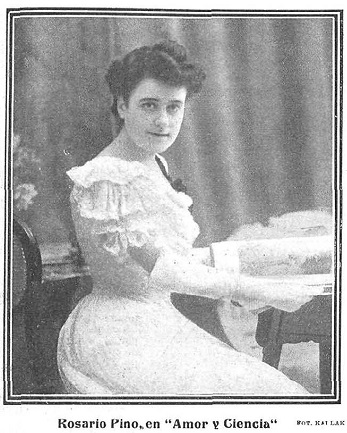
Rosario Pino

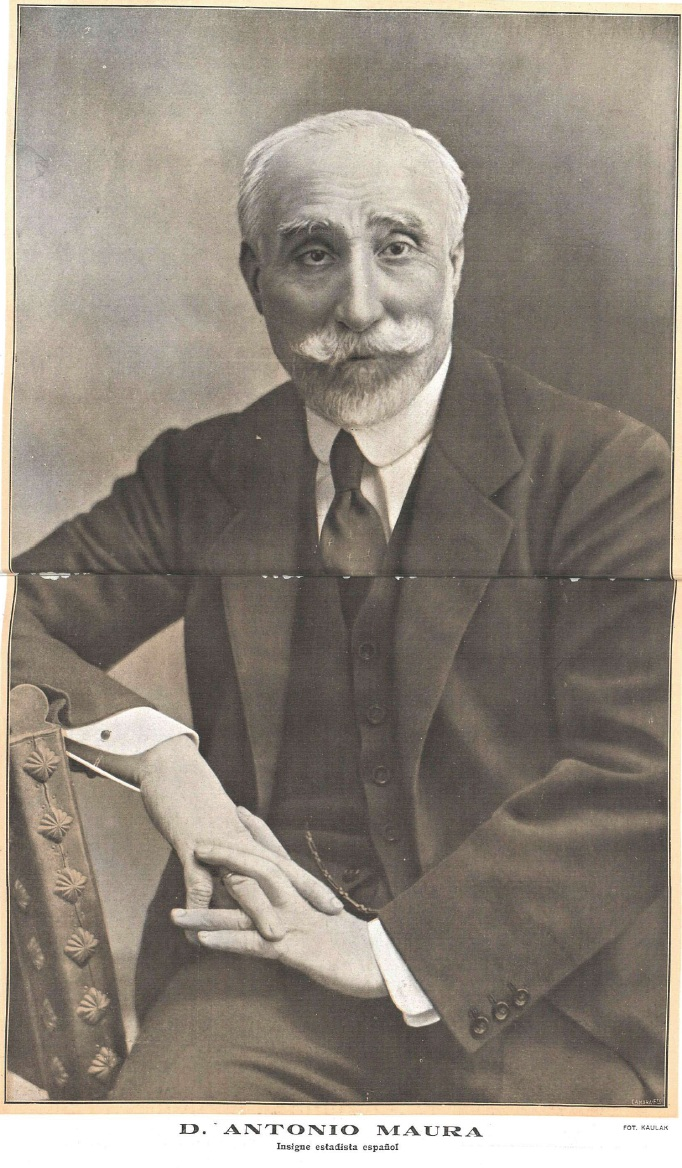
Antonio Maura

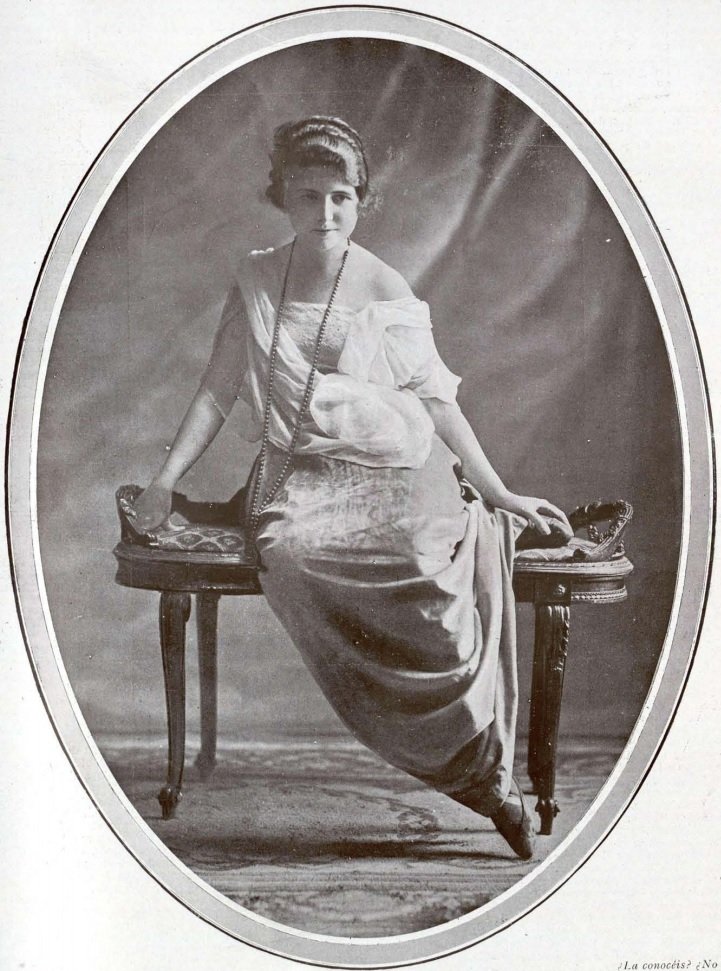
Carmen de Icaza

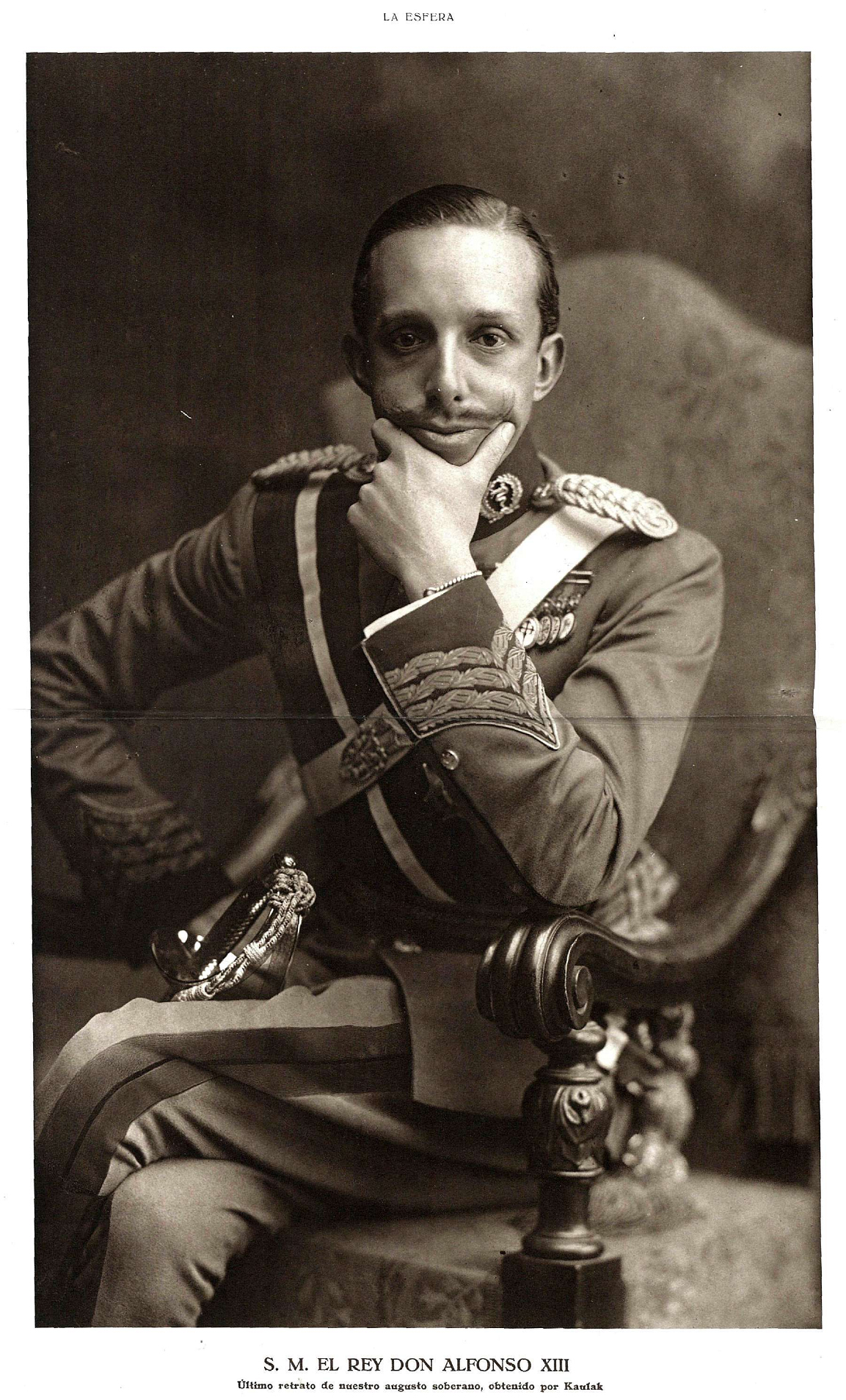
King Alfonso XIII

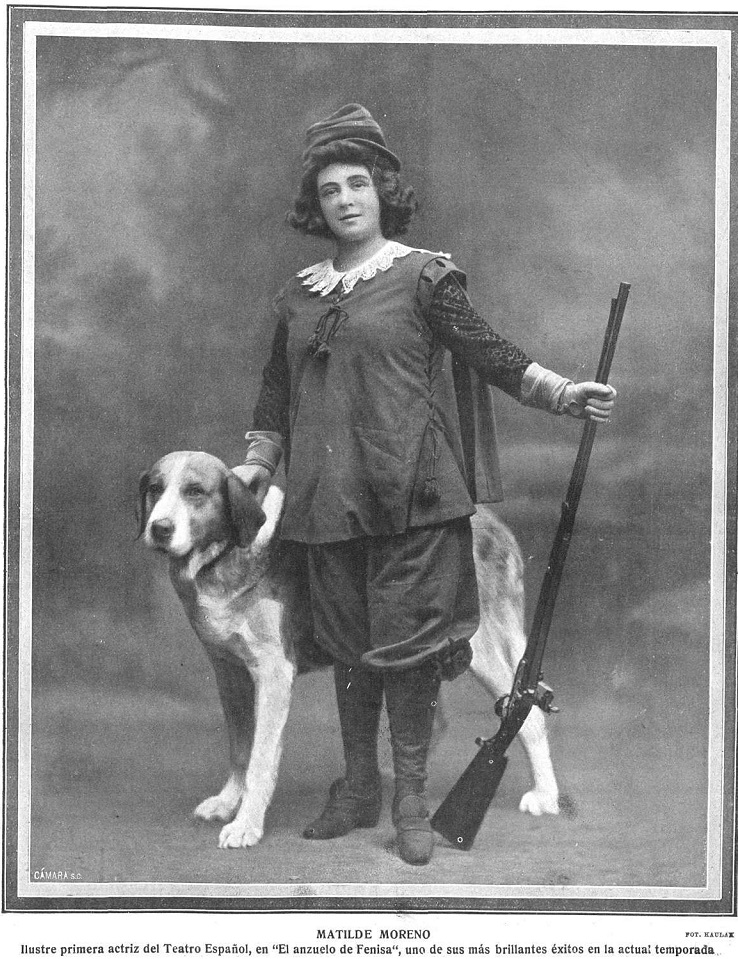
Matilde Moreno

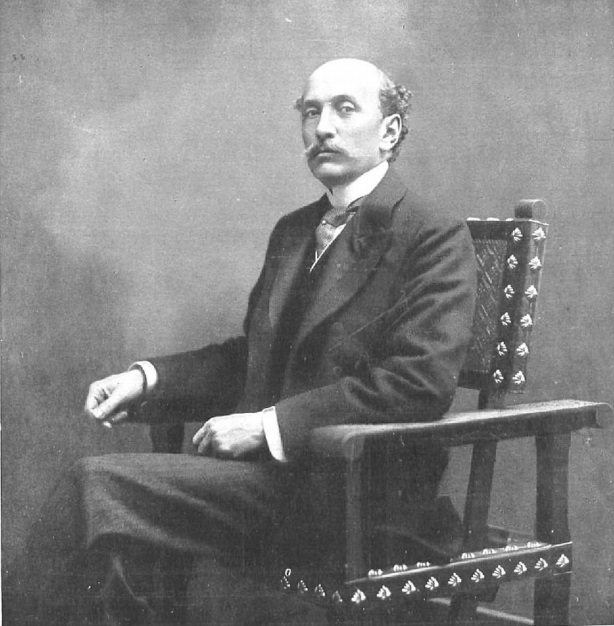
Eduardo Dato
