= Judas' Kiss (1954 film) =

1954 film

- Directed by: Rafael Gil
- Written by: Rafael Gil; Vicente Escrivá; Ramón D. Faraldo
- Starring: Rafael Rivelles; Francisco Rabal; Gérard Tichy
- Cinematography: Alfredo Fraile
- Edited by: José Antonio Rojo
- Music by: Cristóbal Halffter
- Production company: Aspa Producciones Cinematográficas
- Distributed by: CIFESA
- Release date: 28 February 1954
- Running time: 90 minutes
- Country: Spain
- Language: Spanish

Judas' Kiss (Spanish: El beso de Judas) is a 1954 Spanish religious drama film directed by Rafael Gil and starring Rafael Rivelles, Francisco Rabal and Gérard Tichy.

== Plot ==
It tells the story of Judas Iscariot (Rafael Rivelles) with the famous kiss of him betraying Jesus to the Romans in exchange for a few coins. The magazines of the time rapturously described the spectacular nature of El beso de Judas, rarely seen before in Spanish cinema, not even in Alba de América, by Juan de Orduña, which in the end had been shot with severe budget cuts. Eighty-two sets, exteriors shot in the Holy Land (Rafael Gil moved there with a film crew in the summer of 1953 and the images would later be used in long shots or on transparencies of the film), a brilliant cast and – above all – An interesting plot idea characterized El beso de Judas: narrating the story of Jesus from the point of view of Judas. The journalist Barreira ended one of his reports by pointing out: "Never was such a gigantic film presented in Spain, a display of presentation as was required in this one, dealing with the exalted theme of the crucifixion of Christ."

The idea of telling the drama of Judas (which had already been dealt with in El Judas, directed in 1952 by Ignacio F. Iquino, albeit in the form of the actors of a living Passion that is performed in a town in Catalonia) goes back in the summer of 1952. Escrivá presented the project to United Artists, which received it enthusiastically, guaranteeing optimal distribution in numerous American countries. With this guarantee, no expense was spared when it came to structuring spectacular scenes inspired by the American model of the great Cecil B. DeMille (although the black and white of The Kiss of Judas has aesthetic, and even dramatic, concomitance with the version of the life of Christ that Julien Duvivier had filmed in 1935 with his Golgotha).

Enrique Alarcón in artistic direction and Alfredo Fraile in photography, both regular collaborators with Gil, achieved one of their best works in a production that also featured Cristóbal Halffter in the solemn and adjusted music that accompanied the images, and in the montage with José Antonio Rojo, another frequent collaborator of the director whose work is living history of Spanish cinema.

== Cast ==
- Rafael Rivelles as Judas
- Francisco Rabal as Quinto Licinio
- Gérard Tichy as Poncio Pilato
- Fernando Sancho as Padre del condenado
- José Nieto as Jesús
- Manuel Monroy as Pedro
- Félix Dafauce as Misael
- Francisco Arenzana as Dimas
- Gabriel Alcover
- Pedro Anzola
- Luis Hurtado
- Mercedes Albert
- Jacinto San Emeterio as Hombre frente a la cruz
- Santiago Rivero as Hombre frente a la cruz
- Tony Hernández
- Ricardo Turia
- Manuel Kayser as Líder multitud
- José Villasante as Gestas
- Rafael Bardem as Hombre que prepara cena
- Esther Rambal
- Ruth Moly
- Mercedes Serrano
- José Manuel Martín
- Eugenio Domingo as Hijo de Acad el leproso
- Germán Cobos
- Arturo Fernández as Santiago
- Milagros Leal as Mujer que da información a Judas

== Bibliography ==
- Bentley, Bernard P. E. (2008). A Companion to Spanish Cinema. Boydell & Brewer Ltd. ISBN 978-1-85566-176-9.
