= Francisco García Calderón Rey =

Peruvian writer (1883–1953)

Francisco García Calderón Rey (April 8, 1883 in Valparaíso, Chile – July 1, 1953 in Lima, Peru) was a Peruvian writer. He was son of Francisco García Calderón, President of Peru.

== Life ==
Calderón was born into a wealthy and politically prominent family in Valparaíso, Chile on April 8, 1883. His father, for whom Calderón was named, was the President of Peru for a short time during the Chilean occupation of Peru. Calderón occasionally has “Rey” added to his name, to distinguish him from his father.

After finishing a degree in law at the University of San Marcos, he pursued a career in public service and worked in the Ministry of Housing. He also served as president of Arequipa's constitutional congress and was a key figure in the final peace process between Peru and Chile. He was an author and diplomat who also became the Peruvian Minister to Belgium. He was also known for being part of what was called the “Generation of the 900,” who were identified by having old Peruvian nobility in their blood and taking part in the Chilean-Peruvian conflict.

After his father's death, Calderón and his family migrated to Paris. All of his works have been published by European companies. He also played a role in the Paris Peace conference of 1919, a meeting of the Allied Powers of World War I, who determined the fate of the Central Powers.

With Latin America progressing into the 20th Century, many politicians expressed concerns with their countries' relationship with the United States. Calderón, having grown up with politics and politicians and having served as a diplomat as an adult, was concerned about the well-being of Latin America under the Monroe Doctrine and the Roosevelt Corollary. Both were American foreign policies restricting Latin America from reaching out to the European powers at that time and developing their own independent relationships with countries other than the United States. This made the United States the sole supporter of the western hemisphere and the only country that could intervene in any “wrongdoing” to Latin America.

In 1937, he was appointed to the International Committee on Intellectual Cooperation of the League of Nations (he had already replaced Leopoldo Lugones there in 1925).

Francisco wrote a 400-page article concerning itself with Latin America and its U.S. foreign policies. It described what is called “Yankee imperialism.” He died in Lima, Peru, on July 1, 1953.

== "Latin America: Its Rise and Progress" ==
This was Francisco García Calderón’s most read book, published in 1912. Roscoe Hill of Columbia University explains how Calderón presents an “admirable interpretation of the life, the thought, the history and the problems of what he is pleased to call Latin-American Democracies.” The book itself is broken down into volumes, each detailing the different aspects of the lives and histories of Latin Americans from conquest to present times.

Book one, according to Hill, describes the pre-colonial era to the introduction to the mixing of peoples through different types of methods. The coming of the Europeans offered the blood of white men to the indigenous. Africans, who were brought over to replace the Indians as slaves, would also contribute to the mixing of the blood and people of the various “states,” or colonies, of Latin America. With the birth of mulattos, new identities were created. Mulattos are presently able to trace their bloodlines to both “Anglo-Saxons,” a term Calderón coined to refer to the people who were of English descent, and Native Americans who inhabited the area. Creoles, whose ancestry is considered of foreign birth but whose offspring were born on Latin American soil, also contributed to the new Latin American nationality.

Book one also travels into the problems of the Latin American colonies and how they freed themselves through revolutions. Calderón salutes and recognizes the influences of the French Revolutions and the uprisings of the English colonies in North America against its former owner, Great Britain. He also presents a theory about the Latin American revolution leaders and other figureheads. Leaders like Simon Bolivar, he explains, follow the pattern of being “regenerators, restorers, and protectors.” Calderón believed that the leader regenerated the people in believing in becoming independent while restoring order and peace, then finally continuing to protect what he and his followers had fought for. He also theorized that the independent country followed a similar pattern which is as follows: “a revolution, a dictator, a program.” Though many Latin American countries did follow this specific pattern, not all did. It might have been his own personal point of view to call a leader of another country a dictator.

Books two to four were basically in support of his theory, showing some of the different leaders of the Latin American countries, their policies, and how they affected the country. It is not until book six that modern policies or influences are introduced. He talks about the nationality of Latin America in present time and the threats of the outside world upon them. He does not necessarily attack the Monroe Doctrine or its successors, but he intends to show how Northern American policies pertaining to Latin America affect them in the negative light.

He explains how, though there are connections to European countries who also pose a threat (namely Germany), North America, through the Monroe Doctrine, is trying to control the area for itself. By intervening with Latin American foreign policies, the States did not allow other countries to trade with Latin America, giving the Americans 30% control over the exports of Latin America. Calderón also described the situations with Cuba and Puerto Rico, which the Americans claimed to be dealing with but wound up annexing. He also uses the annexation of Texas, the buying of land along Panama to build the canal and the intervening of the country of Acre which was located in present-day western Brazil as some other ways of showing the negative aspects of the Monroe Doctrine and its successors.

On the other hand, Calderón brings up some honorable situations which the Americans have been involved with. The Americans supported and armed Venezuelans to overthrow local tyrants. He also shows that America’s growing industry at the turn of the century helped Latin America technologically advance as well. With the help of the Americans, railroad tracks had been placed so that they could move exports throughout the continent without the use of ships. Since the canal was not yet built, shipping items from one side to the other side of the continent was time-consuming and the contents could spoil or become ruined in the lengthy transport. The high mountains of Peru and Chile were no longer an obstacle which the people would have to endure since they could now pass over them quickly.

Aside from the American foreign policies and other European influences, Calderón argues that Latin America also has its own problems which have nothing to do with the policies of other countries. Regarding the financial issues of the entire continent, he feels that the issues that many of the Latin American countries had were due to their debt problems. The necessary wars with Spain, Calderón explains, are partly to blame since Latin American countries did not have the funds to support their independent wars and had to rely on other countries to lend them money and armaments. Being unable to pay back these loans, the foreign countries, mostly Europeans who had their own reasons for helping these countries against the Spanish, tried to find other means of payment. These means ran along the lines of exported goods, land ownership, and government cooperation. The United States became the sole creditor of the Latin American countries, which led to the United States becoming hegemonic and controlling Latin American countries indirectly.

== Conclusion ==
Calderón's writings conclude that Latin America’s dependency on other countries was inevitable. He continues this thought by explaining that without European (or American) money, none of the luxuries Latin America has today would have been possible. With the help of other countries, railroads spread, ports built, and governments stabilized. Latin America: Its Rise and Progress is not an attack or a defiance of the foreign policies of other countries in Latin America, but rather an explanation for those who possibly think this way. Though it can be argued that many of the policies were an attempt to re-colonize or control the independent states, using such key items as the Monroe Doctrine or the Polk Doctrine, Calderón does not present which side he necessarily stands on.

== Works ==
- De litteris (1904)
- Le Pérou contemporain (1907)
- Profesores de idealismos (1909)
- La creación de un continente (1912)
- Les démocraties latines de l'Amerique (1912)
- Latin America: Its Rise and Progress, with a preface by Raymond Poincaré; translated by Bernard Miall (London: T. Fisher Unwin, [1916])
- El dilemma de la Gran Guerra (1919)
- América Latina y el Perú del novecientos: antología de textos (1834–1905)
