= Arturo Fernández Rodríguez =

Spanish actor (1929–2019)

Arturo Fernández
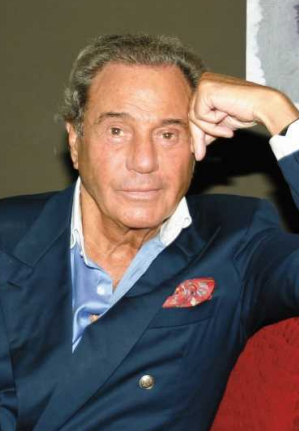
- Born: Arturo Fernández Rodríguez; 21 February 1929; Gijón, Asturias, Spain
- Died: 4 July 2019 (aged 90); Madrid, Spain
- Occupation: Actor
- Years active: 1954–2019

Arturo Fernández Rodríguez (21 February 1929 – 4 July 2019) was a Spanish actor who appeared in numerous films since making his debut in 1954.

== Life and work ==
Fernández Rodríguez was born on 21 February 1929 in Gijón, Asturias. He started a professional career as a boxer, where he gained the nickname of "The tiger of the Piles". In 1952, he served in the military at Logroño; that summer he realized a course of escalation in Viguera's rocks, sleeping for one month in the schools of this town. He married the Isabel Sensat of Catalan in San Vicente of Montalt on 21 March 1967, and they separated in 1978. They had three children: Maria Isabel (1968), Arturo (1970) and Maria Dolores "Boby" (1975).

Fernández Rodríguez underwent stomach surgery in April 2019. He recovered from the surgery, but shortly afterwards suffered a fall. His health deteriorated and he died on 4 July 2019 at a hospital in Madrid from complications related to the fall at the age of 90.

== Acting career ==
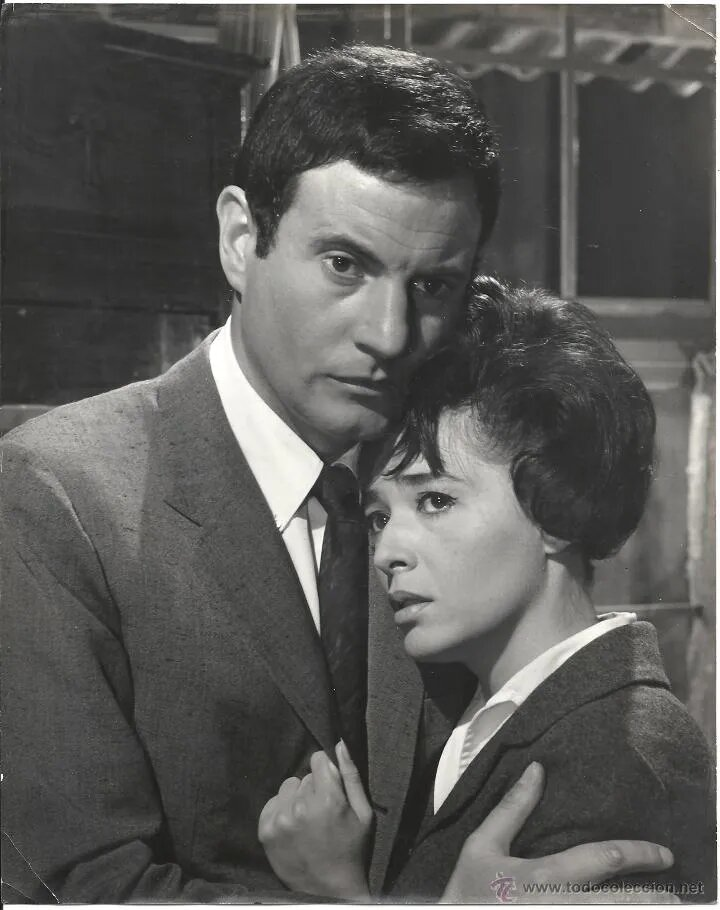
Fernández with Pina Pellicer in Rogelia (1962)

During his career, he was most known as a comedic actor appearing in films such as Un vaso de whisky (1958), Novios 68 (1967) or The Complete Idiot (1970). He usually played the role of a seductive and somewhat cynical gallant.

In television his most famous role was in the series La casa de los líos on Antena 3 between 1996 and 2000. In May 2007 he also played two twin brothers in the series Como el perro y el gato on TVE.

In theatre, he played the main role in, among others, in the play "La herencia" (1957), "La tercera palabra" (1966), "La playa vacía" (1970), "Tribute" (1980),"Romantic Comedy" (1983), "Chapter Two" (1985), "The Secretary Bird" (1986), "Mejor en octubre" (1994) or "Esmoquin" (2001)

== Selected filmography ==
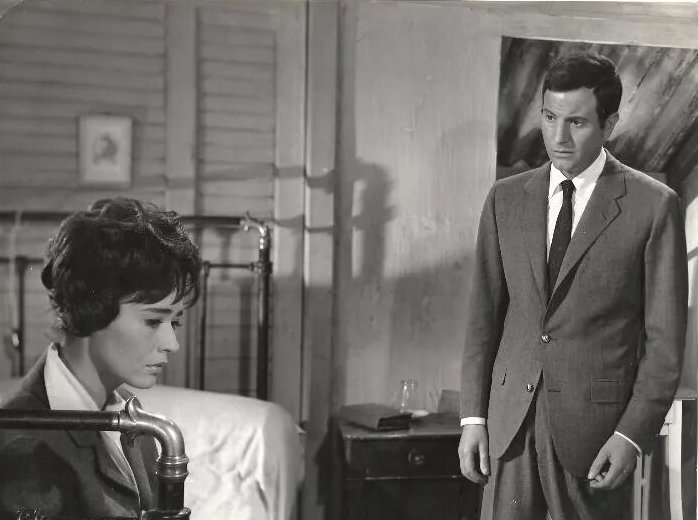
Fernández and Pina Pellicer in Rogelia (1962)

- Judas' Kiss (1954) - Santiago (uncredited)
- La patrulla (1954) - Johnny
- El torero (1954) - Periodista 2º
- Duelo de pasiones (1955)
- Mañana cuando amanezca (1955) - Fedor Kormics - piloto
- Nunca es demasiado tarde (1956) - Pedro
- Cuerda de presos (1956) - Sargento Morales (uncredited)
- Mañana... (1957) - Ladrón
- El andén (1957) - Mariano (uncredited)
- Familia provisional (1958)
- Fifth District (1958) - Gerardo García
- Rapsodia de sangre (1958) - Dalmas
- La frontera del miedo (1958) - Sacerdote
- Cita imposible (1958) - Inspector Fermín
- Red Cross Girls (1958) - Ernesto
- Un vaso de whisky (1959) - Víctor
- College Boarding House (1959) - Gerardo Roquer
- A sangre fría (1959) - Manuel
- Ejército blanco (1959)
- Juicio final (1960) - Amigo de Paco
- La fiel infantería (1960) - Comandante Félix Goñi
- Vida sin risas (1960)
- Maria, Registered in Bilbao (1960) - Eduardo Vila
- Fuga desesperada (1961) - Pierre Morlaix
- Los cuervos (1961) - César
- Regresa un desconocido (1961) - Juan Valdés
- La mentira tiene cabellos rojos (1962) - Enrique Solano
- El último verano (1962) - Jaime
- La viudita naviera (1962) - Tomás Igartua
- Bahía de Palma (1962) - Mario
- Rogelia (1962) - Fernando Vilches
- No temas a la ley (1963) - Toni Basó
- La gran coartada (1963) - Luis
- Escala en Hi-Fi (1963)
- Sol de verano (1963)
- Piedra de toque (1963) - Carlos Rivera
- El sexto sentido (1964) - Pablo
- El salario del crimen (1964) - Mario
- Jandro (1965) - Jandro
- Currito of the Cross (1965) - Ángel Romera 'Romerita'
- Sound of Horror (1966) - Pete
- Las viudas (1966) - Enrique (segment "Luna de miel")
- Road to Rocío (1966) - Alberto Echeve
- Novios 68 (1967) - Emilio Contreras
- No desearás la mujer de tu prójimo (1968) - Alberto
- ¡Cómo sois las mujeres! (1968) - Mario
- Cristina Guzmán (1968) - Alfonso Ribas
- Vedove inconsolabili in cerca di... distrazioni (1968)
- Turistas y bribones (1969) - Romeo
- Pecados conyugales (1969) - Ricardo
- El señorito y las seductoras (1969) - Antonio del Olmo y Matilla
- Las cinco advertencias de Satanás (1945) - Félix
- The Locket (1970) - Alejandro
- ¿Quién soy yo? (1970) - Mario Colomer / Juan Brandel
- The Complete Idiot (1970) - Felipe el Postinero
- Las juergas de 'El Señorito' (1973) - Anselmo / Antonio / Inocencio / Manolo / Pepe
- Casa Flora (1973) - Carlos Vílchez
- Matrimonio al desnudo (1974) - Miguel
- Tocata y fuga de Lolita (1974) - Carlos Villar
- Un lujo a su alcance (1975) - Miguel Montalvo
- El adúltero (1975) - Julián Yagüe
- Cuando los maridos se iban a la guerra (1976) - Don Tello
- La amante perfecta (1976) - Raúl
- Mauricio, mon amour (1976) - Mauricio Fernández
- La muerte ronda a Mónica (1976) - Arturo
- Ésta que lo es... (1977) - Carlos
- El hombre que yo quiero (1978) - Alberto
- Esperando a papá (1980) - Antonio Tejeiro
- El crack dos (1983) - Don Gregorio
- Truhanes (1983) - Gonzalo Millares
- La chica de la piscina (1987) - Claudio Tovar
- El día que nací yo (1991) - Miguel Asenjo Bernal
- Aquí, el que no corre... vuela (1992) - Miguel Lagos
- Tiempos mejores (1994) - Curro
- Dos hombres y una mujer (1994)
- Desde que amanece apetece (2005) - Lorenzo
