= Peace (1949 film) =

1949 film

- Directed by: José Díaz Morales
- Written by: Joaquín Luis Romero Marchent; Antonio Abad Ojuel; Ricardo Toledo; José Díaz Morales
- Produced by: Joaquín Luis Romero Marchent
- Starring: Rafael Durán; Emilia Guiú; Alfredo Mayo
- Cinematography: Alfredo Fraile
- Edited by: Juan Serra
- Music by: Manuel Parada
- Production company: Intercontinental
- Distributed by: Morales Films
- Release date: 25 November 1949
- Running time: 90 minutes
- Country: Spain
- Language: Spanish

Peace (Spanish: Paz) is a 1949 Spanish drama film directed by José Díaz Morales and starring Rafael Durán, Emilia Guiú and Alfredo Mayo. It was shot at the Roptence Studios in Madrid. The film's sets were designed by the art director Francisco Escriñá.

== Cast ==
- Rafael Durán as Raúl Storni / Juan Vencido
- Emilia Guiú as Elena
- Alfredo Mayo as Federico
- Rafael Romero Marchent as Pedro
- José María Lado as Chantajista
- Raúl Cancio as Soldado sin piernas
- José Jaspe as Oficial de las fuerzas del este
- Ramón Martori as Comandante en jefe vencedor
- Pacita de Landa as Niña
- Félix Fernández as Marino
- María Rosa Salgado as Novia de Raúl
- Antonia Plana as Madre de Raúl
- Vera Mendi as Otra novia de Raúl
- Juana Mansó as Madre en hospital
- José Prada as Colaborador de Storni
- Luis García Ortega as Julio del Valle
- Manuel Kayser as Colaborador de Storni
- Jacinto San Emeterio as Ayudante del médico
- José Nieto as Médico comandante
- Manuel Dicenta as Hombre con muletas
- Félix de Pomés as Comandante en jefe vencido
- Concha López Silva as Mujer pobre
- Ricardo Calvo as Sacerdote
- Mariano Asquerino as Presidente del tribunal militar
- Yvonne Lamar as Cantante taberna
- Ana María González as Self
- Julio Goróstegui as Dependiente
- Santiago Rivero as Mayordomo

== Bibliography ==
- Aguilar, Carlos & Genover, Jaume. El cine español en sus intérpretes. BPR Publishers, 1992.
- Ferrando, Jorge Nieto. La memoria cinematográfica de la Guerra Civil española (1939-1982). Publicacions de la Universitat de València, 2008.
