= Vertigo (1951 film) =

- Directed by: Eusebio Fernández Ardavín
- Written by: Eusebio Fernández Ardavín; Antonio Guzmán Merino
- Starring: Fernando Granada; Ana Mariscal; Lina Yegros
- Cinematography: Manuel Berenguer; Andrés Pérez Cubero
- Edited by: Antonio Cánovas
- Music by: Jesús García Leoz
- Production company: Fernando Granada
- Release date: 28 May 1951
- Running time: 91 minutes
- Country: Spain
- Language: Spanish

Vertigo (Spanish: Vértigo) is a 1951 Spanish drama film directed by Eusebio Fernández Ardavín and starring Fernando Granada, Ana Mariscal and Lina Yegros.

== Cast ==
- Fernando Granada as Álvaro
- Ana Mariscal as Blanca
- Lina Yegros as María
- Lola Ramos as Carmela
- Félix Fernández as Don Cosme
- Alfonso Estela as Manuel
- Modesto Cid as Mayordomo
- Carlos Pérez de Roza as Álvaro hijo
- María Severini

== Bibliography ==
- España, Rafael de. Directory of Spanish and Portuguese film-makers and films. Greenwood Press, 1994.
