= Truhanes =

- Theatrical release poster
- Directed by: Miguel Hermoso
- Screenplay by: Miguel Hermoso
- Story by: Manolo Marinero; Luis Ariño; Mario Camus; Miguel Hermoso; José Luis García Sánchez
- Produced by: José Jacoste
- Starring: Francisco Rabal; Arturo Fernández; Isabel Mestres; Vicky Lagos; Rafael Díaz; Lola Flores
- Cinematography: Fernando Arribas
- Edited by: Blanca Guillem
- Music by: José Nieto
- Production company: PE Films
- Distributed by: Suevia Films
- Release dates: September 1983 (Zinemaldia); 17 October 1983 (Spain)
- Country: Spain
- Language: Spanish

Truhanes is a 1983 Spanish buddy comedy film directed by Miguel Hermoso. It stars Francisco Rabal and Arturo Fernández.

== Plot ==
The plot follows the mishaps between white-collar criminal Gonzalo and small-time thief Ginés, as the former seeks protection in prison, and Ginés provides him help in exchange for a promising future out of jail.

== Cast ==
- Arturo Fernández as Gonzalo Millares
- Francisco Rabal as Ginés
- Rafael Díaz as Lupas
- Emilio Fornet as Cuaco
- Fernando Bilbao as el Chino
- Isabel Mestres as Marta
- Vicky Lagos as Amparo
- Lola Flores as Nati
- Antonio Gamero

== Production ==
Truhanes is a PE Films production. The screenplay was authored by Miguel Hermoso based on a story by Manolo Marinero, Mario Camus, Luis Ariño, José Luis García Sánchez, and Hermoso himself.

== Release ==
The film was presented at the 1983 San Sebastián International Film Festival. It was released theatrically in Spain on 17 October 1983. It grossed 82,658,578 ₧ (344,482 admissions).

== Reception ==
Ángel Fernández-Santos of El País declared Truhanes a "magnificent" comedy, otherwise reminiscent of Italian comedies such as Big Deal on Madonna Street and Il Sorpasso, with its best feature being the quality of the performances of the cast.

== Television adaptation ==
Ten years later, the film spawned a television series broadcast on Tele 5.

== See also ==
- List of Spanish films of 1983
