= Currito of the Cross (1936 film) =

1936 film

- Directed by: Fernando Delgado
- Written by: Alejandro Pérez Lugín (novel); Fernando Delgado
- Starring: Antonio Vico; Elisa Ruiz Romero; José Rivero
- Cinematography: Heinrich Gartner; Carlos Pahissa; Ludwig Zahn
- Music by: Jacinto Guerrero
- Production company: E.C.E
- Release date: 1936
- Country: Spain
- Language: Spanish

Currito of the Cross (Spanish:Currito de la Cruz) is a 1936 Spanish drama film directed by Fernando Delgado and starring Antonio Vico, Elisa Ruiz Romero and José Rivero. The film was adapted from Alejandro Pérez Lugín's 1921 novel of the same title, set in the bullfighting world.

== Cast ==
- Antonio Vico as Currito de la Cruz
- Elisa Ruiz Romero as Rocío
- José Rivero as Manuel Carmona
- Antonio García 'Maravilla' as Ángel Romera 'Romerita'
- Ana Adamuz as Manuela
- Carmen Viance as Sor María
- Eduardo Pedrote as Copita
- Emilio Santiago as Gazuza
- Ana de Leyva as Teresa
- Francisca Campos as Dolores
- Nicolás D. Perchicot as Padre Almanzor
- Amparo Villegas as Madre Abadesa
- Antonio Soto as Pollo
- José Ortega as El Pintao

== Bibliography ==
- Labanyi, Jo & Pavlović, Tatjana. A Companion to Spanish Cinema. John Wiley & Sons, 2012.
