= Currito of the Cross (1965 film) =

1965 film

- Directed by: Rafael Gil
- Written by: Alejandro Pérez Lugín (novel); José López Rubio; Luis de Diego; Antonio Abad Ojuel; Rafael Gil
- Starring: Francisco Rabal; Arturo Fernandez; El Pireo; Soledad Miranda
- Cinematography: José F. Aguayo
- Edited by: José Luis Matesanz
- Music by: Manuel Parada
- Production company: Coral Producciones Cinematográficas
- Release date: 1 July 1965
- Running time: 109 minutes
- Country: Spain
- Language: Spanish

Currito of the Cross (Spanish: Currito de la Cruz) is a 1965 Spanish drama film directed by Rafael Gil and starring Francisco Rabal, Arturo Fernandez and El Pireo. It is an adaptation of the novel of the same title by Alejandro Pérez Lugín.

== Cast ==
- Francisco Rabal as Manuel Carmona
- Arturo Fernández as Ángel Romera 'Romerita'
- El Pireo as Currito de la Cruz
- Soledad Miranda as Rocío Carmona
- José Marco Davó as Don Emilio
- Adrián Ortega as Don Ismael
- Luis Ferrín as Gazuza
- Yelena Samarina as Teresa
- Ángel Álvarez as Don Antonio
- Julia Gutiérrez Caba as Madre María
- Mercedes Vecino as Doña Manuela Alonso, viuda de Varela
- Manolo Morán as Copita
- Juan Cortés as Comisario
- Rafael Durán as Carmona
- Carlos Mendy as Pintao

== Bibliography ==
- Labanyi, Jo & Pavlović, Tatjana. A Companion to Spanish Cinema. John Wiley & Sons, 2012.
