= Cristina Guzmán (1968 film) =

- Directed by: Luis César Amadori
- Written by: Carmen de Icaza (novel); Rafael J. Salvia; Jesús María de Arozamena
- Produced by: Luis Sanz
- Starring: Rocío Dúrcal; Arturo Fernández; Isabel Garcés
- Cinematography: Antonio L. Ballesteros
- Edited by: Antonio Ramírez de Loaysa
- Production companies: Cesáreo González Producciones Cinematográficas; Cámara Producciones Cinematográficas
- Distributed by: Suevia Films
- Release date: 11 November 1968
- Running time: 107 minutes
- Country: Spain
- Language: Spanish

Cristina Guzmán is a 1968 Spanish drama film directed by Luis César Amadori and starring Rocío Dúrcal, Arturo Fernández and Isabel Garcés. It is an adaptation of Carmen de Icaza's 1936 novel of the same name, which had previously been turned into a 1943 film.

== Cast ==
- Rocío Dúrcal as Cristina Guzmán/Mara Mont
- Arturo Fernández as Alfonso Rivas
- Isabel Garcés as Mónica
- Emilio Gutiérrez Caba as Javier
- Mónica Randall as Laura
- Rafaela Aparicio as Balbina
- Skippy Martín
- Francisco Guijar
- Rafael Alcántara
- Pedro Mari Sánchez
- José María Caffarel as Dr. Montero
- Luis Morris as Goro
- Lola Herrera
- José Morales
- Miguel Ángel Puerto as Bupi
- Juan Luis Galiardo as Jorge
- Alfonso del Real

== Bibliography ==
- Bentley, Bernard. A Companion to Spanish Cinema. Boydell & Brewer, 2008.
