= Cristina Guzmán (1943 film) =

1943 film by Gonzalo Delgrás

- Directed by: Gonzalo Delgrás
- Written by: Carmen de Icaza (novel); Margarita Robles
- Starring: Marta Santaolalla; Ismael Merlo; Luis García Ortega
- Cinematography: Willy Goldberger
- Edited by: Ramón Biadiú
- Music by: José Ruiz de Azagra
- Production company: Juca Films
- Distributed by: CIFESA
- Release date: 24 May 1943
- Running time: 106 minutes
- Country: Spain
- Language: Spanish

Cristina Guzmán is a 1943 Spanish drama film directed by Gonzalo Delgrás and starring Marta Santaolalla, Ismael Merlo and Luis García Ortega. It was made by CIFESA, Spain's dominant film studio of the era. The film is an adaptation of the 1936 novel Cristina Guzmán by Carmen de Icaza which was later remade in 1968.

== Plot ==
Cristina Guzmán (Marta Santaolalla), is a young widow with a young son in her care, who dedicates herself to giving language classes to support herself. One day she receives a visit from an aristocrat with a surprising proposal that will change her life: she must pretend to be Fifi, the wife of an American millionaire to try to get him to overcome the emotional trauma caused by the abandonment of his real wife.

== Cast ==
- Marta Santaolalla as Cristina Guzmán
- Ismael Merlo as Marqués de Atalanta
- Luis García Ortega as Prince Valmore
- Carlos Muñoz as Joe
- Lily Vincenti as Gladys
- Luis Martínez Tovar as Bubi
- Jorge Greiner as Bert
- Francisco Marimón as Rouvier
- Fernando Fernán Gómez as Bob
- Mary Vera as Georgette
- Pedro Oltra as Alfaro
- Horacio Socías as Fletcher
- Mary Mirell as Ida
- Montserrat Santaolalla as Pelirroja
- Fernando Porredón as Gorito
- Carmen Morando as Balbina
- Francisco Zabala as Amigo del Marqués de Atalanta
- Enriqueta Pezzi
- Juana Mansó
- Eva Arión
- Carlota Bilbao
- Conchita López
- Pablo Hidalgo
- Cristina Yomar
- María Martín
- Pedro Calderón

== Bibliography ==
- Bentley, Bernard. A Companion to Spanish Cinema. Boydell & Brewer, 2008.
