= Gold and Ivory =

- Directed by: Gonzalo Delgrás
- Written by: Gonzalo Delgrás; Pascual Guillén; Antonio Quintero
- Cinematography: José Gaspar
- Music by: Manuel L. Quiroga
- Production company: Hidalguía Films
- Release date: 16 June 1947
- Running time: 97 minutes
- Country: Spain
- Language: Spanish

Gold and Ivory (Spanish:Oro y marfil) is a 1947 Spanish film directed by Gonzalo Delgrás.

== Sinopsys ==
A rich andalusian playboy (Cabré) falls in love with a poor singer (Mistral) but everything goes wrong. Years later she has a great success and they meet again.

== Cast ==
- Mario Cabré
- Rafael Calvo Gutiérrez as Presentador de artistas
- Leonor María G. de Castro
- Emilio Fábregas as Catador de vinos
- Francisco Linares-Rivas as Administrador de La Pandereta
- Carmen Llanos
- Nati Mistral
- Fernando Porredón
- Domingo Rivas as Diego Cortés
- Flora Soler
- José Suárez
- Rosita Valero as Chica con flor

== Bibliography ==
- Eva Woods Peiró. White Gypsies: Race and Stardom in Spanish Musical Films. U of Minnesota Press, 2012.
