= Francisco García Calderón =

President of Peru in 1881

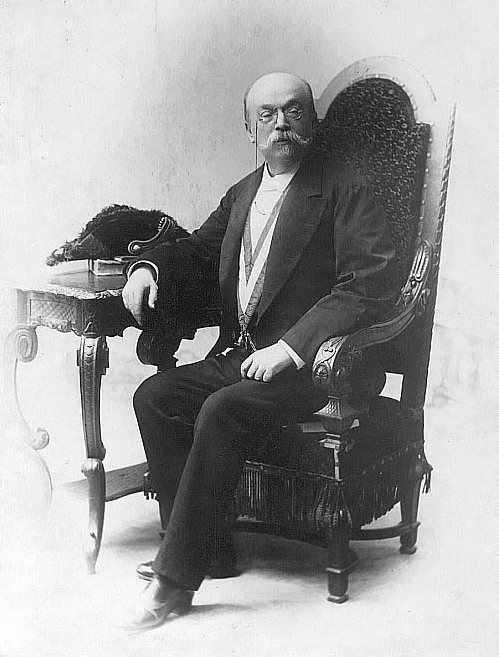

Provisional President of Peru (La Magdalena Government)
- In office March 12, 1881 – September 28, 1881
- Prime Minister: Aurelio Denegri Valega
- Vice President: Lizardo Montero Flores; Andrés Cáceres
- Preceded by: Nicolás de Piérola
- Succeeded by: Lizardo Montero Flores

Personal details
- Born: April 2, 1834 Arequipa, Peru
- Died: September 21, 1905 (aged 71) Lima, Peru
- Party: Independent
- Other political affiliations: Club Nacional
- Profession: Lawyer

Francisco García Calderón Landa (April 2, 1834 – September 21, 1905) was a lawyer and Provisional President of the Republic of Peru for a short seven-month period in 1881, during the War of the Pacific. García Calderón was a key figure in the final peace accords between Peru and Chile. Later in post-presidential career, in 1892, he was commissioned to arbitrate land disputes between Peru and Ecuador, which centered on the contested provinces of Mainas, Jaén and Tumbes. He was an academic as well, having authored a comprehensive history of the previously mentioned contested provinces, as well as a monograph on Peruvian legislation titled, Diccionario de la Legislación Peruana.

== Early life ==
Francisco García Calderón was born in Arequipa on April 2, 1834, as the son of Judge Doctor Eduardo García Calderón y Crespo and Ventura Landa y Guerola. He studied at the Colegio de la Independencia (English: Independence College) where he later worked as professor of Philosophy and Mathematics.

With his Diccionario de la Legislación Peruana (English: Dictionary of Peruvian Legislation) he established his name as an eminent lawyer. He served as the President of the Constituent Congress in 1867. From 1868 to 1869 he served as Minister of Finance for a short period of time. He served as the President of the Senate from 1886 to 1887.

== Personal life ==
His sons Francisco Garcia Calderon and Ventura Garcia Calderon became eminent intellectuals in Peru. Another son, Jose Garcia Calderon, also a writer and artist, died in 1916 at the Battle of Verdun.

Political offices
| Preceded by Nicolás de Piérola | Provisional President of the Republic of Peru; 1881 | Succeeded by Lizardo Montero Flores |
