= Fernando Delgado =

Spanish film director

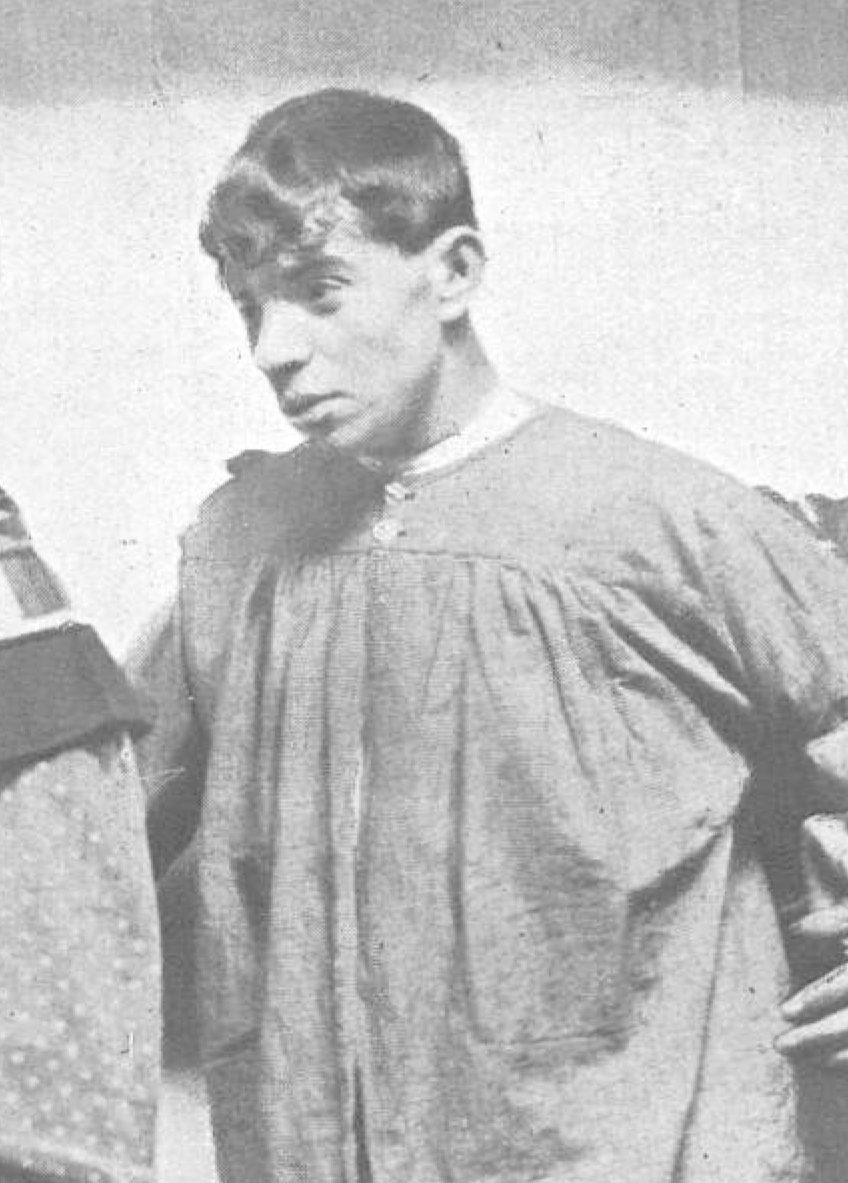
- Born: 25 January 1891; Madrid, Spain
- Died: 25 December 1950 (aged 59); Madrid, Spain
- Occupations: Director, Screenwriter, Actor
- Years active: 1911–1947(film)

Fernando Delgado (25 January 1891 – 25 December 1950) was a Spanish actor, screenwriter and film director. Delgado directed a mixture of documentary and feature films, including the 1936 bullfighting drama Currito of the Cross. His son Luis María Delgado was also a film director.

== Biography ==
He was the son of Palencia-born writer Sinesio Delgado and grandson of actress Balbina Valverde. Involved in the early days of silent cinema in Spain, he abandoned his law studies to collaborate with Jacinto Benavente on the film adaptation of Los intereses creados (Interests Created) and later La madona de las rosas (The Madonna of the Roses).

Delgado directed a mix of documentaries and feature films, notably Cabrita que tira al monte (1925), Las de Méndez (1927), Viva Madrid, que es mi pueblo (1928), Currito de la Cruz (1936), La gitanilla (1940), Fortunato (film) (1942), La patria chica (1943), and La maja del capote (1944).

He was the father of film director and screenwriter Luis María Delgado (1926–2007) and journalist Alberto Delgado Cebrián (1938).

== Selected filmography ==
- Currito of the Cross (1936)
- La gitanilla (1940)
- Fortunato (1942)

== Bibliography ==
- Labanyi, Jo & Pavlović, Tatjana. A Companion to Spanish Cinema. John Wiley & Sons, 2012.
