= Margarita Robles (screenwriter) =

Spanish screenwriter

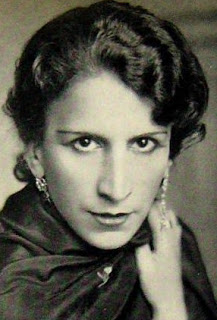
- Born: 20 May 1894; Asturias, Spain
- Died: 11 July 1989 (aged 95); Madrid, Spain
- Occupation(s): Screenwriter, actress
- Spouse: Gonzalo Delgrás

Margarita Robles was a Spanish screenwriter and actress active from the 1940s through the 1970s. She was married to Spanish film director Gonzalo Delgrás, with whom she frequently collaborated.

== Career ==
The play, which had generated enormous expectation, was a tremendous failure that led to the ruin of the company, but which Margarita will remember as "the most glorious defeat of all our lives". They toured Spain with Maya, by Simon Gantillon, adapted by Azorín. At the Teatro Cómico in Madrid they premiered "Inri", a play in original verse by Gonzalo Delgrás. In 1932 she travels to Paris, hired by Paramount to dub in Spanish for Greta Garbo and Marlene Dietrich, among other great stars. In 1934, Gonzalo Delgrás was hired to direct the new Metro-Goldwyn Mayer dubbing studios in Barcelona. During the Spanish Civil War, he dubbed several films from the Soviet Union. From 1940, she combined her work as an actress with those of scriptwriter and dialogue writer, mainly in films directed by her husband.6 She remained active until the 1970s. She was the mother of four children: Gonzalo, Margarita, José Manuel and Maria Paz.

In 1982, she published her autobiography entitled "Mis ochenta y ocho añitos" ("My Eighty-Eight Years").

Margarita Robles, in the maturity of her film career.

She died on July 11, 1989, at the age of 95.

== Selected filmography ==
=== As screenwriter ===
- El hombre que veía la muerte (1955)
- Under the Skies of the Asturias (1951)
- Un viaje de novios (1948)
- Trece onzas de oro (1947)
- El misterioso viajero del Clipper (1945)
- Ni tuyo ni mío (1944)
- Altar mayor (1944)
- La boda de Quinita Flores (1943)
- Cristina Guzmán (1943)
- La condesa María (1942)
- Un marido a precio fijo (1942)

=== As actress ===
- The House Without Frontiers (1972)
- Run, Psycho, Run (1968)
- Piso de soltero (1964)
- El Cristo de los Faroles (1958)
- El genio alegre (1957)
- Miracle of the White Suit (1956)
- La lupa (1955)
- La hermana alegría (1955)
- The Song of Sister Maria (1952)
- Cerca de la ciudad (1952)
- El misterioso viajero del Clipper (1945)
- Altar mayor (1944)
- La condesa María (1942)
- La doncella de la duquesa (1941)
- Los millones de Polichinela (1941)
