= José García Calderón =

Peruvian artist and writer

José García Calderón (1888 – 5 May 1916) was a Peruvian artist and writer who died in the Battle of Verdun in the First World War. He was the son of Francisco Garcia Calderón, provisional president of Peru, and the brother of noted intellectuals Francisco, Juan, and Ventura Garcia Calderon. His works were published by his brothers after his death. Serving as an artillery observer in a balloon, the rope of his balloon broke on 5 May 1916 and the wind sent him to the German lines. He died after he escaped his balloon with a parachute.

== Works ==
- José Garcia Calderon, Diaro intimo, 12 de setiembre 1914-3 de mayo, 1916, Lima, Universidad nacional mayor de San Marcos, 1969, 135 p.
- José Garcia-Calderon, Reliquias, Paris, s.n., 1917, 82 p.
