= Ernesto Icaza Sánchez =

Mexican painter and horse rider

Ernesto Icaza "El charro pintor"
- Born: Trinidad Ernesto Timoteo Francisco Icaza Sánchez; January 26, 1866
- Died: 1935 (aged 68–69)
- Movement: Mexican muralism

Trinidad Ernesto Timoteo Francisco Icaza Sánchez (January 26, 1866 – 1935) was a Mexican painter and an ambitious horse rider, who became known for hundreds of horse and rider oil paintings, why he was also called the "charro pintor".

== Biography ==
Ernesto Icaza was one of four children of Joaquín de Icaza Mora and his second wife María de la Luz Victoria Sánchez Colomo. His mother died in 1881. On February 25, 1891, he married Diega María Ángela Cruzado Basabe. They had one girl: María de la Luz Icaza Cruzado. It is unknown if he studied painting, or if he was self-trained. He also painted some typical Mexican murals between 1910 and 1920. His works are findable in notable galleries and museums, many of them are private owned.

== Literature ==
- Luis Ortíz Macedo: Ernesto Icaza: el charro pintor. (Spanish), ISBN 978-970-35-0762-7
- Marcos Daniel Aguilar: 'Ernesto Icaza: del caballo al caballete', in Gestos del centauro (México: Ediciones Periféricas, 2021), p.25. (Spanish), ISBN 9786079903541
