= Luis Felipe Ortega =

Mexican artist (born 1966)

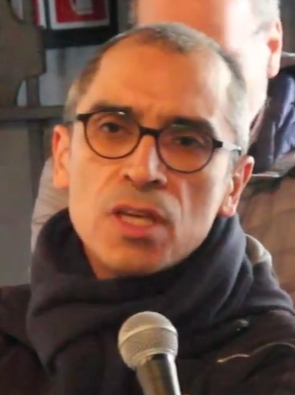
- Ortega in 2018
- Born: 1966 (age 59–60); Cuidad, Mexico
- Occupation: Contemporary Artist

Luis Felipe Ortega (born 1966, Mexico City) is a Mexican contemporary artist. Since 1993 he has exhibited individually and collectively both in Mexico and abroad. He was a Representative of Mexico's Pavilion in the 56th Venice Biennale in 2015 with Tania Candiani. His dedication on presenting various ideas and visions are honorable as he approached it by means of various mediums such as videos, audio, drawings, sculptures, and installations.

"The journey is very important; if there isn't, you're not in a complex relationship with the part. This journey can go from more to less or from less to more and from there make a series of equations between sculpture, image and sound. All this wants to put the piece itself in crisis."

— Luis Felipe Ortega, Ignacio Ponce, La Tempestad

== Biography ==
His career started in the 1990s as a writer for the newspaper, La Jornada and El Nacional. Since the start of his career, Luis Felipe Ortega has worked on many publication throughout his careers. Some of these books are editorial projects, book projects, and/or catalogues from previous exhibits. In 2002 he became an artist resident at the International Studio and Curatorial Program (ISCP) and soon after he exhibited in various exhibitions at a global scale.

=== Featured exhibitions ===
==== Campo de acción (1997) ====
Luis Felipe Ortega made his first solo exhibition, Campo de acción, in Mexico City at the GALERÍA ART & IDEA. This exhibition highlights the importance of time that, "consist of message-text planted in long lines across the walls and augmented by large painting-form arrangements of small photographs, depicting the actions of a person waiting (drinking a cup of coffee) or moving (watching traffic go by, for example)". The exhibition uses photographs and videos as its medium, which catches and highlights a person's daily-life activities.

==== Nothing Else (2001) ====
His exhibit titled, Nothing Else took place in New York, United States at the International Studio and Curatorial Program (ISCP), which supports the artist, curators through their residence and public programs. Ortega was a resident artist for the international Studio and Curatorial Program (ISCP) in 2002.

==== Inverted Horizon (2010) ====
This exhibit took place at the Museo de la Ciudad de Mexico. According to the artist, this exhibition is "...the search for a line and the relationship that the observer forms with it." The exhibition takes place a room with a white line on the walk, which is at an eye level. It "investigates the tensions that exist between artistic conventions and the subjectivity of the creator: it proposes a certain tension between conceptual art and the technical knowledge necessary to materialize an idea." During the same year, Luis Felipe Ortega had another exhibit where he collaborated with a fellow artist, Tania Candiani in Mexico City titled, So it is, now is now, which took place at the Laboratorio Arte Alameda. Their artwork was projected in the pavilion wall that represents "the unpredictability of a natural disequilibrium circumstance and the different responses to it."

==== Notes for an Inclusion of Silence (2013) ====
In 2013 Luis Felipe Ortega had an exhibit in Ciudad de Mexico, Mexico at the Marso Galeria, an independent curatorial initiative and art gallery focused on highlighting contemporary artist around the world. According to Marcela Quiroz, " Ink and graphite drawings in a variety of formats suggest basic geometries, showing that the artist is just as empathetic and clever in his treatment of empty space as he is persistent at inventing/discovering, amid those myriad traces within each stroke, almost invisible volumes—indeed, even movement." The artist opted out on his usual cinematic approach used graphite on paper as his medium for this show.

==== Landscape and Geometry (for P.P.P) (2017) ====
In 2017, he had a solo exhibit titled Landscape and Geometry (for P.P.P) in Oaxaca, Mexico at the Centro de Las Artes de San Agustin (CASA). His work can be viewed in a room where multiple strings are tied to numerous poles inside the building. That same year, he exhibited at the Museo Experimental el Eco in Mexico City, Mexico where his work, Regarding the Edge of Things was featured.

==== ...y luego se tornará resquicio (2022) ====
Ortega's latest exhibit titled, ...y luego se tornará resquicio, took place in Puebla, Mexico City at Museo Amparo from February 5, 2022 - May 23, 2023. Luis Felipe Ortega highlights his interest in time and space with this exhibit as he "...deals with producing liminal spaces in which the materials and techniques of execution become fundamental: both the scale of the pieces, as well as the material of each one of them carry with them a specific work that allows a peculiar imagination of the time invested in its realization.

== Education ==
He completed his undergraduate degree in the Faculty of Letters and Philosophy at Universidad Nacional Autónoma de México (UNAM). Luis Felipe Ortega held an artistic residency in the International Studio & Curatorial Program (ISCP) in New York City in 2002.

== Publication ==
1. Seis ensayos... a propósito de Calvino FONCA - CONACULTA - CASPER 1999. Mexico City.
2. Ocupación - Turner 2007. Mexico. ISBN 968-9056-05-0
3. Horizonte Invertido - Museo de la Ciudad de México 2010. Mexico.
4. La Universidad Desconocida - LAST / Desiré St Phalle 2011. Mexico.
5. Doble Exposure (Expanded) - Marso 2013. Mexico.
6. Possessing Nature - CONACTULA / INBA 2015. Mexico. ISBN 978-607-605-342-3
7. Before the Horizon. Luis Felipe Ortega - Marso / Turner 2016. Mexico. ISBN 978-84-16714-37-7

== Artworks ==
- ...y luego se tornará resquicio, Museo Amparo, Puebla (2022)
- A Horizon Falls, A Shadow, Mattatoio-MACRO, Rome (2018)
- A propósito del borde de las cosas, Museo Experimental El Eco, Mexico (2017)

== Exhibitions (selections) ==
- Bienal de Coimbra, Portugal(2019)
- La Biennale di Venezia, Mexican's National Pavillon, Venece (2015)
- Pague Biennale, Czech Republic (2009)
- Tirana Biennale, Albania (2001)
- Gwangju Biennale, South Korea (2000)
- The Work of Translation, Armory Center for de Arts, Pasadena (2017)
- Punk, sus Rastros en el Arte Contemporáneo
- MACBA/Barcelona, Museo Universitario del Chopo/Mexico (2016)
- Strange Currencies. Art and Action in Mexico City 1990-2000
- The Galleries at Moore College of Art and Design, Philadelphia (2016)
- Moving Time: Video Art at 50, 1965-2015, Eli and Edythe Broad Art Museum, Michigan (2016)
- Antes de la Resaca. Una Fracción de los Noventa en la Colección del MUAC, Mexico (2011)
- La Era de la Discrepancia, MUAC, Mexico, MALBA, Buenos Aires, Argentina/Pinacoteca do Estado de São Paulo, Brazil (2008)
- Esquiador en el Fondo del Pozo, Jumex, Mexico; After the Act, MUMOK Museum Moderner Kunst, Austria (2005)
- Cover Theory. L'arte Contemporanea Come Re-interpretazione, Officina della Luce, Italy (2003)
- Elephant Juice (Sexo entre amigos), Kurimanzutto, Mexico (2003)
- Ummaguma: Especies de Indeterminación, Mexico, (1995)
- Jorge Kunst Uit Mexico, Belgium (1994) y Temístocles 44-I (Decoraciones para el hogar), Mexico (1993).

== Collections ==
- Así es, ahora es ahora, Laboratorio Arte Alameda, Mexico (2010)
- Horizonte Invertido, El Clauselito, Museo de la Ciudad de México, Mexico (2010)
- Before the Horizon, Maison d’Art Actuel des Chartreux, Belgium (2006)
- Ocupación, Sala de Arte Público Siqueiros, Mexico (2004)
- Km 96, Kurimanzutto, México (2002)
- Yo, Nosotros, Centro de la Imagen, Mexico (2000)
- Campo de acción, Art&Idea, Mexico (1997)

== Honors and awards ==
- Sistema Nacional de Creadores (2006, 2009, 2015, 2020)
- FONCA, Jóvenes Creadores (1998)
