= Juan Simón's Daughter (1957 film) =

- Directed by: Gonzalo Delgrás
- Written by: Nemesio M. Sobrevila (play); Jesús María de Arozamena; Antonio Mas Guindal
- Produced by: Teodoro Herrero
- Starring: Antonio Molina; María Cuadra; Mario Berriatúa
- Cinematography: Antonio Macasoli
- Edited by: Pedro del Rey
- Music by: Daniel Montorio
- Production company: Unión Films
- Release date: 24 June 1957
- Running time: 82 minutes
- Country: Spain
- Language: Spanish

Juan Simón's Daughter (Spanish:La hija de Juan Simón) is a 1957 Spanish musical drama film directed by Gonzalo Delgrás and starring Antonio Molina, María Cuadra and Mario Berriatúa. It is based on the play by Nemesio M. Sobrevila. A 1935 film of the same title had previously been made.

== Cast ==
- Antonio Molina as Antonio Lucena
- María Cuadra as Carmen García Luque 'Carmela'
- Mario Berriatúa as Alfonso Guzmán
- Manuel de Juan as Padre de Carmela
- Maruja García Alonso
- Celia Condado
- Dolores Quesada
- Carmen Sanz
- Lis Rogi as Francesa
- Celia Foster
- Juana Cáceres as Madre de Carmela
- Miguel del Castillo as Marqués
- Luis Ramirez
- Rufino Inglés as Director sesión fotográfica
- Luis Domínguez Luna
- José Fermán
- María Jesús García
- Juanita Muñiz
- Carmen Pastor
- Lidya Batalla
- José Vilar
- José Morales
- José Izquierdo Monje
- Calero Parra
- Antonio Molino Rojo
- Carmen Pérez Gallo
- Antonio Martínez as Productor con botella de champán (as Antonio Martinez)
- Jesús Narro
- María Avelenda
- Lolita Márquez
- Fernando Somoza
- José Peromingo
- Antonio Moreno
- Antonio Martín
- José Manuel Ramirez
- Amalia Sánchez Ariño
- Francisco Salas
- Gonzalo Delgrás as Director de la película

== Bibliography ==
- Eva Woods Peiró. White Gypsies: Race and Stardom in Spanish Musical Films. U of Minnesota Press, 2012.
