= The Complete Idiot (1939 film) =

- Directed by: Gonzalo Delgrás
- Written by: Pilar Millán Astray (play); Gonzalo Delgrás
- Cinematography: José Gaspar
- Edited by: Ramón Biadiú
- Music by: Rafael Martínez Valls
- Production company: Procines
- Release date: 22 December 1939
- Running time: 99 minutes
- Country: Spain
- Language: Spanish

The Complete Idiot (Spanish: La tonta del bote) is a 1939 Spanish comedy film directed by Gonzalo Delgrás. It was remade in 1970.

== Cast ==
In alphabetical order

- Ángel Alguacil
- Rafael Durán
- Camino Garrigó
- Sacha Goudine as dancer
- Josita Hernán
- Carmen López Lagar
- Amparo Martí
- Antoñita Mas
- Olga B. Peiró

== Bibliography ==
- Bentley, Bernard. A Companion to Spanish Cinema. Boydell & Brewer 2008.
