= Francisco A. de Icaza =

Mexican poet and diplomat

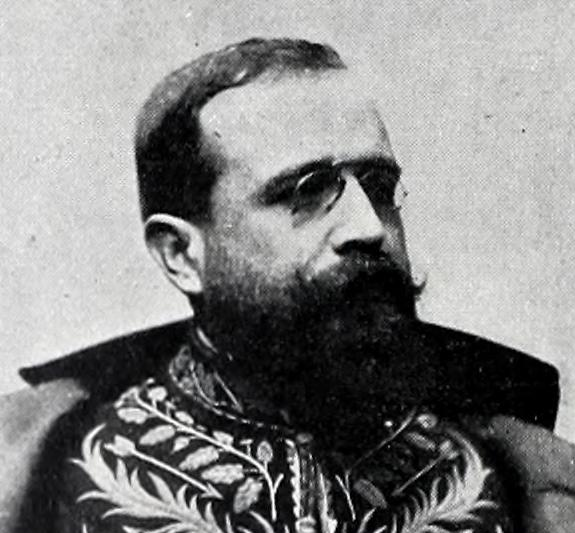
1900-11-24, Black and White, Official Delegates of the Hispanic American Congress of 1900, Franzen, c (cropped) Francisco A. de Icaza

Francisco de Asís de Icaza y Beña (born 2 February 1863 in Mexico City, Mexico – d. 28 May 1925 in Madrid, Spain) was a Mexican poet, literary critic, and historian of literature who spent most of his adult career and life in Spain. He was the father of Carmen de Icaza, VIII Baronesa de Claret, a popular Spanish novelist.

== Biography ==
Francisco Asís de Icaza y Beña was born on 2 February 1863 in Mexico City, Mexico, son of Ignacio de Icaza e Iturbe and María Tomasa Beña y García.

In his twenties he was posted to the Mexican legation in Madrid, during the embassy of his friend Vicente Riva Palacio; he became ambassador to Germany and to Spain.

Known at first for his poetry, Icaza achieved some notoriety with his Examen de críticos (1894). His scholarly analysis Novelas ejemplares de Cervantes (1901), examining Miguel de Cervantes's work in Novelas ejemplares, was acclaimed and gained him membership in the Ateneo de Madrid. He published scholarly works of literary history and was a corresponding member of the Mexican and Spanish Academies.

In addition to his works on Cervantes and Lope de Vega, Icaza translated into Spanish various works by Nietzsche, Hebbel, Liliencron and Dehmel.

A visit to his homeland was marred by the nationalist polemic that surrounded his critical Diccionario autobiográfico de conquistadores y pobladores de la Nueva España (Madrid, 1923).

In Spain, Icaza married the young Beatriz de León y Loynaz (1878–1971), born in La Habana and niece of a Spanish aristocrat. The couple had six children, including novelist Carmen de Icaza.
