= Luis García Ortega =

Spanish actor and screenwriter

- Occupations: Actor, Writer
- Years active: 1925-1977 (TV & film)

Luis García Ortega was a Spanish actor and screenwriter. He had served in the Spanish Foreign Legion which was a major influence on his screenplay for the 1941 film ¡Harka!.

== Selected filmography ==
=== Actor ===
- Cristina Guzmán (1943)
- The Princess of the Ursines (1947)
- Peace (1949)
- Tormented Soul (1950)

== Bibliography ==
- Luisa Passerini, Jo Labanyi & Karen Diehl. Europe and Love in Cinema. Intellect Books, 2012.
