= Cristina Guzmán (TV series) =

- Genre: Telenovela
- Created by: Caridad Bravo Adams
- Directed by: Ernesto Alonso
- Starring: Amparo Rivelles; Enrique Rocha
- Country of origin: Mexico
- Original language: Spanish

Production
- Executive producer: Ernesto Alonso
- Cinematography: José Morris

Original release
- Network: Telesistema Mexicano
- Release: 1966

Related
- Los ricos también lloran (1979-1980); María la del Barrio (1995-1996); Marina (2006)

Cristina Guzmán is a Mexican telenovela produced by Ernesto Alonso for Telesistema Mexicano in 1966.

== Cast ==
- Amparo Rivelles as Cristina Guzmán/Claudia
- Enrique Rocha
- Aarón Hernán
- Teresa Grobois
- Ariadna Welter
- Ernesto Alonso as Gabriel
- Antonio Bravo
- Fedora Capdevila
- Fanny Schiller
- Jorge Mondragón
- Rosa Furman
- Carlos Fernández
- Alberto Zayas
- Luis Gimeno

== Remakes ==
- Los ricos también lloran (1979–1980)
- María la del Barrio (1995–1996)
- Marina (2006)
