= Manuel González (actor) =

Spanish actor

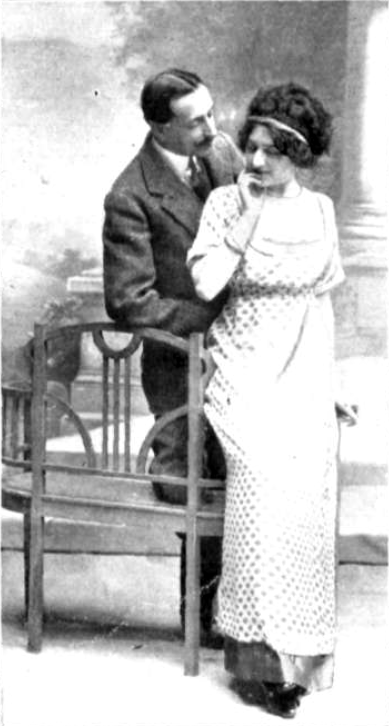
- Manuel González and Mercedes Pérez Vargas at Teatro de la Comedia, Madrid, 1911
- Died: 1946; Madrid

Manuel González (d. Madrid; December 24, 1946) was a Spanish actor.

== Biography ==
He developed his artistic career on the stages of the capital of Spain. His beginnings were at Teatro de la Comedia with Mercedes Pérez de Vargas. Shortly after he joined the company of Juan Bonafé and specialized in comedy. He also worked as a theater director.

During the 1930s he worked at Teatro Español in Madrid, on whose stage he performed, among other plays, Don Juan Tenorio, by Zorrilla and Electra, by Galdós. During the Spanish Civil War he was a tenant of the theater. He was performing El alcalde de Zalamea when Francisco Franco's troops entered Madrid on March 28, 1939. After the war, he joined Antonio Vico, Carmen Carbonell and Concha Catalá to create the company Los cuatro ases (The Four Aces).

He died as a result of an angina pectoris.
