= Gonzalo Delgrás =

Spanish screenwriter and film director (1897-1984)

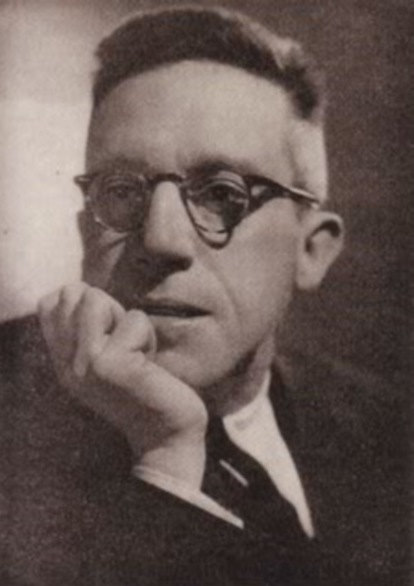
- Born: 3 October 1897; Barcelona, Catalonia, Spain
- Died: 24 October 1984 (aged 87); Madrid, Spain
- Other name: Gonzalo Pardo Delgrás
- Occupations: Director, Screenwriter
- Years active: 1939-1968 (film)
- Spouse: Margarita Robles

Gonzalo Delgrás (1897–1984) was a Spanish screenwriter and film director.

== Selected filmography ==
- The Complete Idiot (1939)
- The Hired Husband (1942)
- Cristina Guzmán (1943)
- Gold and Ivory (1947)
- Under the Skies of the Asturias (1951)
- Juan Simón's Daughter (1957)

== Bibliography ==
- Mira, Alberto. The A to Z of Spanish Cinema. Scarecrow Press, 2010.
