= Carmen de Icaza, 8th Baroness of Claret =

Spanish journalist

The Most Illustrious The Baroness of Claret
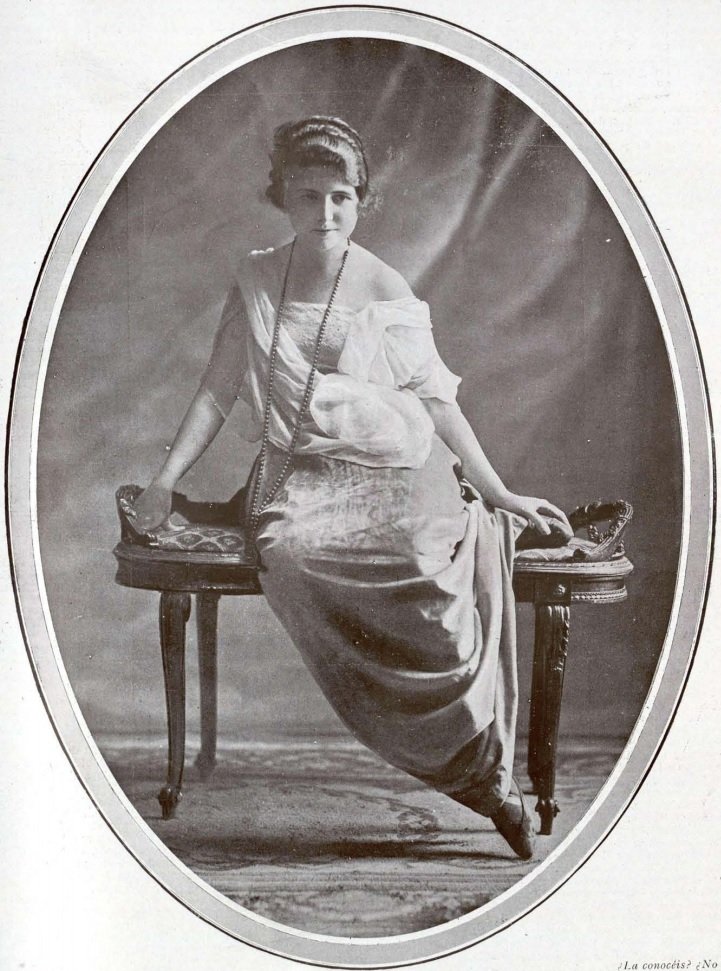
- Photograph by Kaulak
- Born: María Carmen de Icaza y de León; 17 May 1899; Madrid, Kingdom of Spain
- Died: 16 March 1979 (aged 79); Madrid, Spain
- Occupations: journalist, writer
- Spouse(s): Pedro Montojo Sureda (1930-1978; his death); 1 child
- Writing career
- Pen name: Valeria de León, Carmen de Icaza
- Language: Spanish
- Period: 1935-1960
- Notable work: Cristina Guzmán

María Carmen de Icaza y de León, 8th Baroness of Claret (17 May 1899 – 16 March 1979) was a Spanish journalist and novelist from 1935–60. She enjoyed success with her 1936 novel, Cristina Guzmán, which was subsequently adapted for the stage, television and cinema. By 1945, she was a best-selling writer in Spain. Her father was Mexican writer and diplomat Francisco A. de Icaza.

== Biography ==
María Carmen de Icaza y de León was born on 17 May 1899 in Madrid, the second daughter of Francisco Asís de Icaza y Beña, a Mexican ambassador and poet, and his wife, Beatriz de León y Loynaz, born in La Habana, daughter of Spanish aristocrats. She had four sisters: Beatriz, Ana María, María Luz and María Sonsoles (Marquesa de Llanzol), and one brother, Francisco de Asís.

One 1925, her father died, and she began working at El Sol newspaper. In 1930, she married Lt. Col. Pedro Montojo Sureda, and in 1932 they had her only daughter Paloma Montojo y de Icaza, mother of Íñigo Méndez de Vigo.

She started to writing novels in 1935 as Valeria de León, later she used her real name Carmen de Icaza. On 14 December 1951, she obtained her noble title of 8th Baroness of Claret, by her collaboration with charity.

Her husband died on 17 March in 1978, and she died on 16 March 1979 in her native Madrid.

== Bibliography ==
=== As Valeria de León ===
- La boda del Duque Kurt (1935) (reedited as Talía in 1951)

=== As Carmen de Icaza ===
- Cristina Guzmán (1936)
- ¡Quién sabe...! (1939)
- Soñar la vida (1941)
- Vestida de tul (1942)
- El tiempo vuelve (1945)
- La fuente enterrada (1947)
- Yo, la Reina (1950)
- Las horas contadas (1953)
- La casa de enfrente (1960)
