= Alejandro Pérez Lugín =

Spanish writer and film director

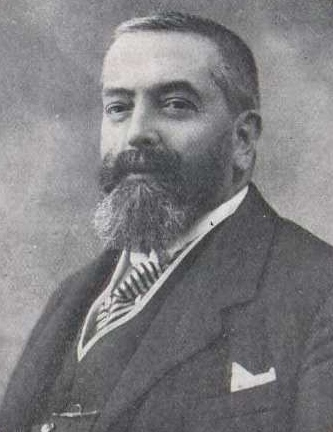
- Alejandro Pérez Lugín
- Born: 22 February 1870; Madrid, Spain
- Died: 5 September 1926 (aged 56); A Coruña, Spain
- Occupations: Director, screenwriter, journalist

Alejandro Pérez Lugín (1870–1926) was a Spanish writer and film director. He attended university in Santiago de Compostela, and a number of his books have Galician themes. His 1921 novel Currito of the Cross, which uses bullfighting as its backdrop, has been adapted into film four times. Pérez Lugin himself directed successful film adaptations of two of his works during the silent era.

== Works ==
=== Literature ===
La Casa de la Troya, 65th ed.

- La Casa de la Troya (1915), Fastenrath Award
- Currito de la Cruz (1921)
- La corredoira y la rúa (1922)
- Arminda Moscoso (Posthumous, 1928)
- La virgen del Rocío ya entró en Triana (Posthumous, 1929)

=== Selected filmography as director ===
- The House of Troy (1925)
- Currito of the Cross (1926)

== Bibliography ==
- Labanyi, Jo & Pavlović, Tatjana. A Companion to Spanish Cinema. John Wiley & Sons, 2012.
