= List of Spanish films of 1959 =

A list of films produced in Spain in 1959 (see 1959 in film).

== 1959 ==
Title	Director	Cast	Genre	Notes
1959
El pisito	Marco Ferreri	José Luis López Vázquez, Mary Carrillo	Dark comedy	The first Spanish film to be directed by Italian Marco Ferreri. The Ministry of Culture forced to credit Spaniard Isidoro M. Ferry as director but he did not film. Spanish Neorealism
El baile	Edgar Neville	Conchita Montes, Alberto Closas, Rafael Alonso	Comedy - Drama	
Honeymoon	Michael Powell	Anthony Steel, Ludmilla Tchérina	Drama	Co-production with United Kingdom
Los chicos	Marco Ferreri	María Luisa Ponte	Drama	The second Spanish film to be directed by Italian Marco Ferreri. Spanish Neorealism
El Lazarillo de Tormes	César Fernández Ardavín	Marco Paoletti	Drama	Golden Bear winner at 10th Berlin International Film Festival. It's the adaptation of Lazarillo de Tormes 16th century classic.
Los golfos	Carlos Saura		Drama	Not released until 1962. First Saura's film. Spanish Neorealism and entered into the 1960 Cannes Film Festival
La vida alrededor	Fernando Fernán Gómez	Fernando Fernán Gómez, Analía Gadé		Sequel of La vida por delante.
Luna de Miel	Michael Powell	Anthony Steel, Ludmilla Tchérina, Antonio, Léonide Massine	Drama	Entered into the 1959 Cannes Film Festival
Sonatas	Juan Antonio Bardem	María Félix, Francisco Rabal, Aurora Bautista	Historical drama	Co-production with Mexico
Ten Ready Rifles	José Luis Sáenz de Heredia			Entered into the 9th Berlin International Film Festival
Los tramposos	Pedro Lazaga	Tony Leblanc, Antonio Ozores, Concha Velasco, Laura Valenzuela	Comedy	
Ten Ready Rifles	José Luis Sáenz de Heredia			Entered into the 9th Berlin International Film Festival
Where Are You Going, Alfonso XII?	Luis César Amadori	Vicente Parra, Paquita Rico	Historical drama	Huge blockbuster about Alfonso XII of Spain and his wife Mercedes of Orléans
Zarzuela 1900	Juan de Orduña	Ninón Sevilla, Olga Guillot, Armando Calvo		
