= A Woman in the Rain =

- Theatrical release poster
- Spanish: Una mujer bajo la lluvia
- Directed by: Gerardo Vera
- Screenplay by: Manuel Hidalgo; Carmen Posadas; Gerardo Vera
- Based on: Life on a Thread by Edgar Neville
- Starring: Ángela Molina; Antonio Banderas; Imanol Arias
- Narrated by: Javier Gurruchaga
- Cinematography: José Luis López Linares
- Edited by: Pablo G. del Amo
- Music by: Mariano Díaz
- Production company: Atrium Productions
- Distributed by: United International Pictures
- Release date: 28 February 1992
- Country: Spain
- Language: Spanish

A Woman in the Rain (Spanish: Una mujer bajo la lluvia) is a 1992 Spanish comedy film directed by Gerardo Vera which stars Ángela Molina, Antonio Banderas, and Imanol Arias. It is a remake of the 1945 film Life on a Thread.

== Plot ==
Following the plight of glamorous woman Mercedes, caught in a rainstorm in Madrid, the plot bisects into two alternative tales in which Mercedes is picked up by different suitors: Basque socially-awkward businessman Ramón and handsome young artist Miguel.

== Cast ==
- Ángela Molina as Mercedes
- Antonio Banderas as Miguel
- Imanol Arias as Ramón
- Kiti Manver as Alicia
- Marta Fernández Muro as Clara Isabel
- Mari Carmen Ramírez as Luisita
- Carlos Hipólito as Alfonso
- Jeannine Mestre as Patricia
- Manuel Alexandre as don Emilio
- Mary Carrillo as madre de Ramón
- Conchita Montes as tía Amparitxu
- Mayrata O'Wisiedo as doña Milagros
- Javier Gurruchaga as narrador

== Production ==
An Atrium production, A Woman in the Rain is Gerardo Vera's directorial feature film debut. It is a remake of the script of Edgar Neville's 1945 film Life on a Thread (also adapted by Neville into a stage play in 1959). The screenplay was penned by Manuel Hidalgo, Carmen Posadas, and Gerardo Vera.

== Release ==
Distributed by United International Pictures, the film was theatrically released in Spain on 28 February 1992.

== See also ==
- List of Spanish films of 1992

== Bibliography ==
- Bardzinska, Joanna (2014). "La vida en un hilo, de Edgar Neville". El camino inverso: del cine al teatro: La vida en un hilo, de Edgar Neville y Mi adorado Juan, de Miguel Mihura. The Modern Humanities Research Association. ISBN 978-1-78188-006-7.
- Perriam, Chris (2003). Stars and Masculinities in Spanish Cinema: From Banderas to Bardem. Oxford: Oxford University Press. p. 37. ISBN 0-19-815996-X.
- Zatlin, Phyllis (2005). Theatrical Translation and Film Adaptation: A Practitioner's View. Clevedon · Buffalo · Toronto: Multilingual Matters LTD. p. 163. ISBN 1-85359-832-1.
