= Porto Rafael =

Frazione in Sardinia, Italy

- Frazione
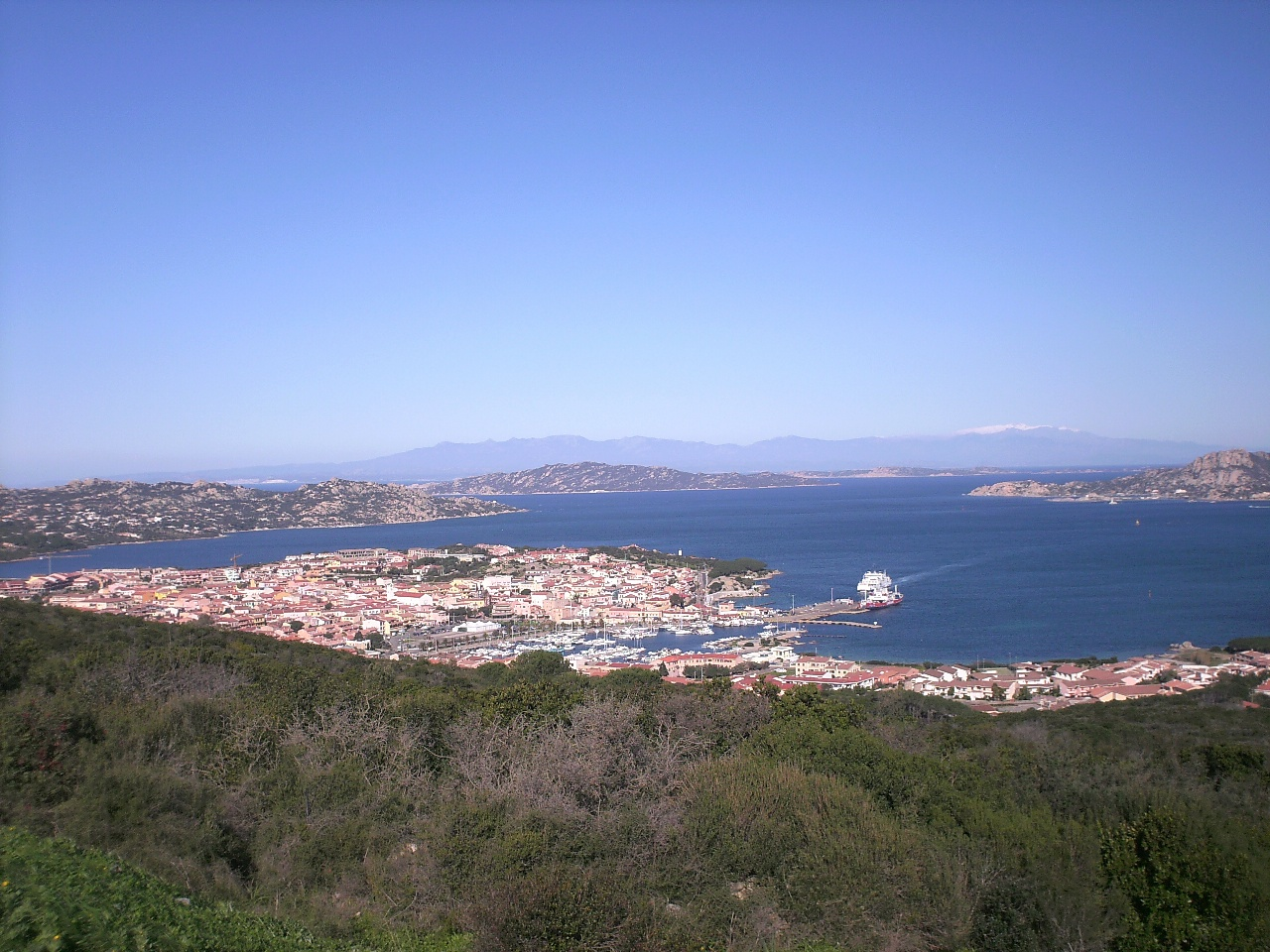
- View of Palau

- Location of Porto Rafael in Italy
- Coordinates: 41.1933179°N 9.3643773°E
- Country: Italy
- Region: Sardinia
- Province: Gallura North-East Sardinia
- Comune: Palau
- Time zone: UTC+1 (CET)
  - Summer (DST): UTC+2 (CEST)

Porto Rafael is an Italian seaside resort in northern Sardinia. It is a frazione of the comune of Palau, near Punta Sardegna, in the Province of Gallura North-East Sardinia.

The frazione overlooks the Cala Inglese, facing the La Maddalena Archipelago, in the northernmost part of the municipality of Palau. It is a village made up mostly of white Mediterranean-style houses, clustered around the main square. The tiny church of Santa Rita is also located here. Docks for boats are located on either side of the beach.

About 600 meters north of Porto Rafael is the Marina of the Porto Rafael, with Punta Sardegna Yacht Club.

== History ==
The small resort of Porto Rafael was founded on the North Eastern coast of Sardinia, Italy, by Rafael Neville, Count of Berlanga de Duero, in 1960.

Neville was an artist, and the son of Edgar Neville the Hollywood film director, playwright and novelist. His grandfather Edward Neville Riddlesdale was the director of the Julius Neville motor company in Spain. Rafael Neville's maternal family were Spanish aristocrats; his grandmother Maria Romrée y Palacios was a lady in waiting in the Spanish court and the family title was inherited through the male line from her. His mother Angeles Rubio Arguelles y Allessandri was founding patron of a theatre in Malaga, Spain, named Teatro Ara where she also directed plays. Rafael was born on 21 August 1926 in Malaga and sent to Paris and London to be educated. His father wanted him to study Architecture in Paris, but his bohemian son had other ideas, and became a chorus dancer in the Follies Bergeres dancing in Josephine Baker's shows.

In 1958, Rafael Neville decided to take a trip to Sardinia and first landed in Porto Torres with his Lambretta on a ship coming from Barcelona. Then Rafael reached Alghero, where he was welcomed by some noble Spanish-Catalan friends who hosted him for a certain period. It was during a dinner at a friend's house that he met Carlo Pocobelli, then a surveyor for the municipality of La Maddalena, and he told him of his dream of building a house by the sea, a small kingdom, a youthful dream. Pocobelli then invited him to visit the island of La Maddalena. It was during the return journey from the island to Palau, accompanied by Carlo Pocobelli and Aldo Chirico, deputy mayor of La Maddalena, that he stumbled upon a small bay facing the Maddalena archipelago and he fell irrevocably in love with it. In 1960 he bought this small patch of land between Baia di Nelson (where Lord Nelson had once anchored his fleet) and Punta Sardegna, near the town of Palau, known to the locals as "Lu roccattoghiu", from a local landowner called Paolo Cudoni and for the rest of his life, built a small village on the sea as he had always dreamed, in fact the motto of his eponymous resort was "sognare è vivere" (a living dream).

Construction began in 1960, with the help of some friends, including local builder Domenico Manna, who became a great friend of Rafael, and the American actress Shirley Douglas, who later married Donald Sutherland.

In 1961, Rafael's first home was a former Italian military post still called "La Mitraglietta", an Italian military post used during the Second World War. This makeshift accommodation was the basis for his future developments on the island.

In 1961, the land development expanded and more houses and villas were built, commissioned by wealthy and noble families. From a few hectares purchased they increased to 140 hectares.

Many of the earliest buildings and the tiny chapel of Saint Rita were designed by Michele Busiri Vici, the renowned architect working for the Aga Khan IV, 30 minutes along the coast at Porto Cervo.

In 1962, Rafael Neville built his house by the sea, next to the small beach, called La Casita, as he had always dreamed.

In 1963 architects such as Alberto Ponis, who been an assistant to Denys Lasdun working on the National Theatre in London, arrived to add a gently modernist style to the resort, and Ponis subsequently has written several books on the architecture of Porto Cervo and Porto Rafael.

Several celebrities built houses in Porto Rafael, choosing it above the more flashy Porto Cervo because there were no hotels, it was quiet, secluded and far from prying paparazzi. One of the first to buy land and build a house, designed by Michele Busiri Vici, was Richard Ward, a brother of the Earl of Dudley. Then came a cousin of the Aga Khan IV and the Guinness heiress Maureen Dufferin, Marchioness of Dufferin and Ava.

In 1965 the famous Piazzetta was created with its final home called "Il Municipio".

Rafael Neville was also famous for his huge birthday parties, which were attended not only by friends, but also by celebrities, famous people, and even ordinary people, and which were open to all and held in the Piazzetta.

In 1980, Along with the chapel, the centre of Porto Rafael includes a small delicatessen, two little bars, a restaurant, various boutiques, the beach beyond the Piazzetta, and a wooden pontoon for incoming tenders. There is also a yacht club at Marina Porto Rafael, five small beaches and two tennis courts.

Almost all the houses and villas in Porto Rafael, immersed in the typical Mediterranean scrub of the area, are white or red, with red roofs that recall the red color of the local granite rocks.

Rafael Neville had many friends who flocked to his resort, and he spent his summers in Porto Rafael until his death in 1996. His birthday is celebrated in the Piazzetta, named after Rafael Neville, every year on 21 August. This date is now considered, after his death, the feast of Porto Rafael. In 2026 the centenary anniversary of his birth and the 30th anniversary of his death occurred.

For residents and friends who favored the development of Porto Rafael, Neville was the founder of the village, while for his detractors, he was one of the figures involved in the real estate development of the 1960s and 1970s along the coasts of Sardinia, particularly the Costa Smeralda, which they viewed as exploiting the economic and social conditions of its inhabitants..

In the early 1960s, land on sea in the Costa Smeralda was selling for 40 lire per square meter. Other residents managed to sell for as much as 300 lire per square meter. Prices that, with the devaluation of the Italian lira in the following years, aroused bitter regret among the landowners, mostly shepherds. With the introduction of the euro and the landscape restrictions imposed by subsequent regional and national laws, these lands, now built over with houses and villas, reached a real estate value of hundreds of millions of euros and today these are part of the Italian real estate market, particularly the Italian luxury real estate market.
