= Punta Palau Lighthouse =

Punta Palau
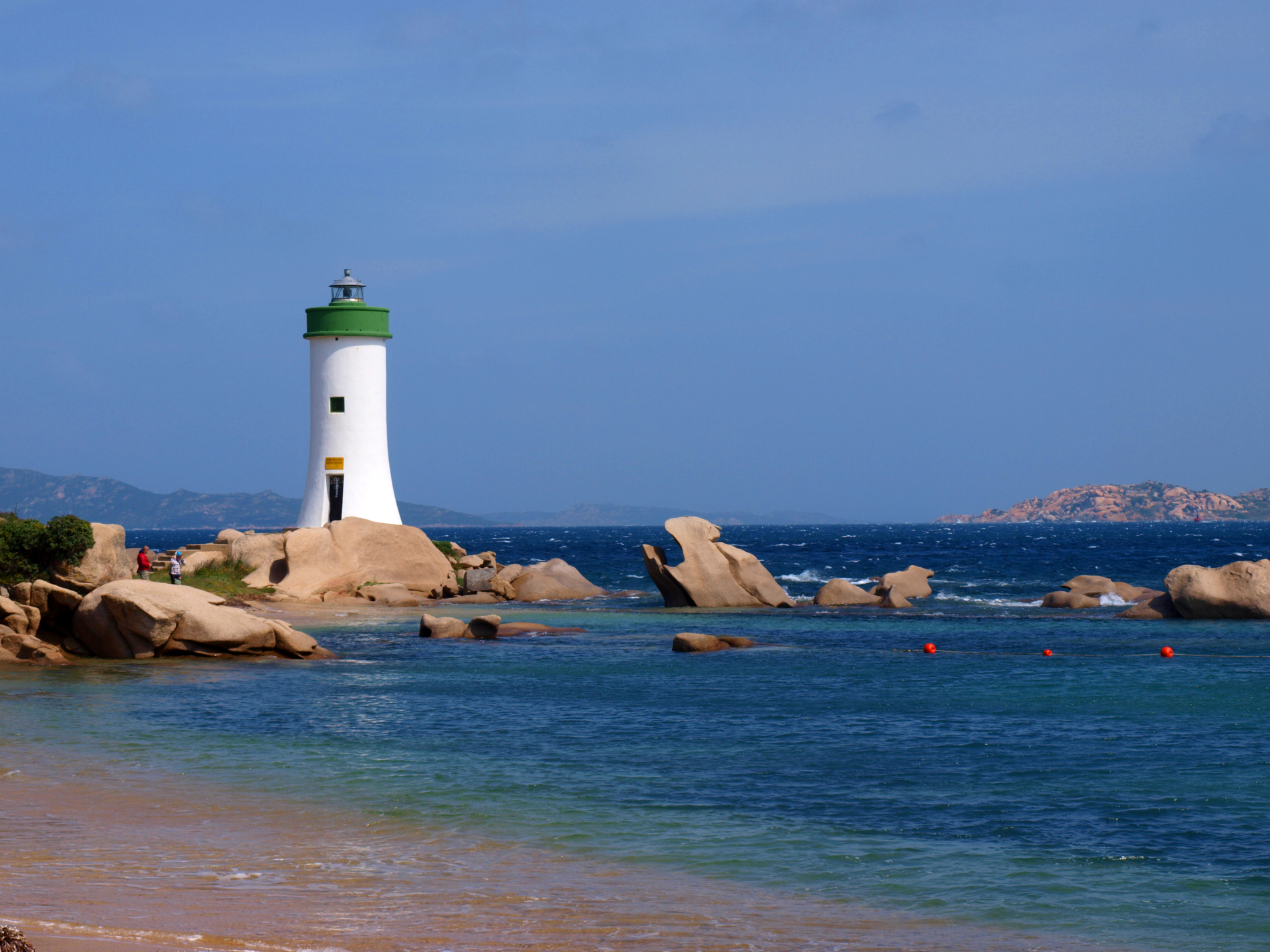
- Punta Palau Lighthouse
- Location: Palau; Sardinia; Italy
- Coordinates: 41°11′15″N 9°22′52″E

Tower
- Constructed: 1935 (first)
- Foundation: concrete base
- Construction: masonry tower
- Height: 10 metres (33 ft)
- Shape: tapered cylindrical tower with balcony and lantern
- Markings: white tower and lantern, green balcony, grey metallic lantern roof
- Power source: solar power
- Operator: Marina Militare

Light
- First lit: 1960s. (current)
- Deactivated: 1960s. (first)
- Focal height: 15 metres (49 ft)
- Range: 4 nautical miles (7.4 km; 4.6 mi)
- Characteristic: Fl (2) G 10s.
- Italy no.: 1034 E.F.

Punta Palau Lighthouse (Italian: Faro di Punta Palau) is an active lighthouse located on the northern extremity of a granite promontory where, shaped by time, appears a natural sculpture that looks like a bear, symbol of Palau in front of the Maddalena archipelago on the Tyrrhenian Sea.

== Description ==
The first lighthouse was established in 1935, the current, built in the 1960s., consists of a masonry tapered cylindrical tower, 10 metres (33 ft) high, with balcony and lantern. The tower and the lantern are painted white, the balcony in green and the lantern dome in grey metallic. The light is positioned at 15 metres (49 ft) above sea level and emits two green flashes in a 10 seconds period visible up to a distance of 4 nautical miles (7.4 km; 4.6 mi). The lighthouse is completely automated, powered by a solar unit and managed by the Marina Militare with the identification code number 1034 E.F.

== See also ==
- List of lighthouses in Italy
