= Michele Busiri Vici =

Italian architect (1894–1981)

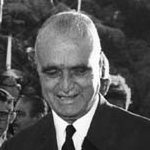
- Michele Busiri Vici.
- Born: May 2, 1894; Rome, Italy
- Died: February 4, 1981 (aged 86); Rome, Italy
- Occupation: Architect

Michele Busiri Vici (2 May 1894 – 4 February 1981) was an Italian architect and urban planner, belonging to the Busiri Vici family of architects who have been active since the seventeenth century. A winner of the Prix de Rome, he is known for his work on the Costa Smeralda in Sardinia.

== Early life ==
Busiri Vici was born in Rome, where in 1921 he graduated from the School of Engineering. Among his earliest works is the design of the new National Museum of Archaeology and Ethnography GA Sanna in Sassari, which he created with his father, Carlo. The project, built between April 1925 and December 1929, was commissioned by Zelí Castoldi Sanna, daughter of the entrepreneur and patron of the arts in Sassari Giovanni Antonio Sanna.

=== Family background ===
The Busiri Vici family includes a number of French-Italian architects formed by the union of the French Beausire family with the Vici family of Arcevia. The progenitor of the French side of the dynasty was Jean Beausire (1651–1743), whose descendants thrived as architects under the Ancien Régime. On the Italian side, Andrea Vici (1743–1817) was a second generation architect who gained regard for his work under Luigi Vanvitelli on the Palace of Caserta and later gained Vatican patronage. Andrea's daughter Barbara Vici married Beausire's descendant Giulio Cesare Busiri (1792–1818) in 1815, joining the two families as Busiri Vici. Famous members of the family include Clemente Busiri Vici (1887–1965), who designed churches for Pope Pius XI, such as Gran Madre di Dio and San Roberto Bellarmino, both in Rome. Clemente's brother Michele Busiri Vici (1894–1981) worked on the Costa Smeralda. Another brother, Andrea Busiri Vici (1903–1989), was a prominent architect, art critic and scholar who worked with his brother Clemente on San Roberto Bellarmino. Andrea and his brothers also worked on a variety of projects for the Fascist hierarchy, including the design for the Istituto Luce, a propaganda arm for the state. Clemente also helped design villas for prominent members of the Fascist leadership including the Maresciallo Pietro Badoglio.

== Career ==
Vici began his working life in the studio of his older brother Clemente. Between 1926-1928 they designed and built a castle for the Gaulino family in Sestri Levante and a villa-museum for the Gaulino family in Turin. Since 1945 the Villa Gaulino has been a prestigious hotel.

In 1930, this time without the collaboration of his brother, Vici created the villa Attolico near Porta Latina in Rome. With his colleague Louis Piccinato, he arranged the European parks and gardens display for the Universal Exhibition of 1942 (E42). During the same period he restored the Castle of Torre in Pietra near Rome. In 1938 he was entrusted with the design and construction of gardens around the archaeological site of Ostia Antica, under the supervision of Piccinato.

In 1939 Vici traveled to the United States, where he received an award from the city of New York for the design of the Italian Pavilion at the 1939 New York World's Fair. In 1955 he was asked to compose the master plan of the coast of Sabaudia in Lazio, central Italy, and in consequence designed and built numerous villas in the area between Sabaudia and San Felice Circeo. It was here that he developed a personal style ("Mediterranean architecture"), characterized by soft, whitewashed walls and fixtures painted in the colour now known as 'Busiris Green'. In later years he also worked on the arrangement of the excavations of Ostia Antica, the port of ancient Rome, and created several villas at Appia Antica, Anzio and Torre in Pietra. During his long career he tackled various disciplines of architectural practice. As a naval architect he created the interior of the turbine steamship Raphael for the Italian Navigation Company. As an urban architect he contributed to the redevelopment of Athens and Rome, where his distinctive buildings remain, many with windows still painted Busiris Green, in the Via Vigna Stelluti, Ponte Milvio and Parioli areas.

In the early sixties, Vici was commissioned by the Aga Khan Prince Karim Aga Khan IV, along with Luigi Vietti and Jacques Couelle, other leading architects of the time, to create Porto Cervo and the Costa Smeralda, or "Emerald Coast", in Sardinia. Vici designed the Church of Stella Maris in Porto Cervo, which remains one of his most distinctive designs. He also built the Hotel Romazzino and Hotel Lucia della Muntagna and the district of Sa Conca, along with numerous villas for Veruschka von Lehndorff and others.

=== Architectural style ===
Developing the 'Mediterranean' style of architecture he had already tested on the Pontine Marshes area, Vici adopted even softer, organic forms, almost always coated with whitewash, and repeating decorative elements such as chimneys, arches, triangular slits, Mediterranean terracotta tiles and ceramics. He often incorporated elements of the landscape into his interiors - for instance leaving handsome granite boulders where they lay and incorporating them into a living room as cushion-scattered sofas.

Further north along the eastern coast of Sardinia, at Porto Rafael opposite the archipelago of La Madalena, Vici designed the Piazzetta, a chapel, and numerous private villas, for instance for the Ward and Brandolini families, during the course of the 1960s. His work in Porto Cervo and Porto Rafael made a decisive contribution to the creation of the contemporary landscape of the north of Sardinia and has been celebrated in exhibitions and books.

== Death ==
Michele Busiri Vici retired in 1977, and died in Rome, aged 86. His grandson, also named Michele Busiri Vici, practices architecture in New York City, where he is principal and founder of Space4Architecture (S4A).
