= Porto Cervo =

- Frazione
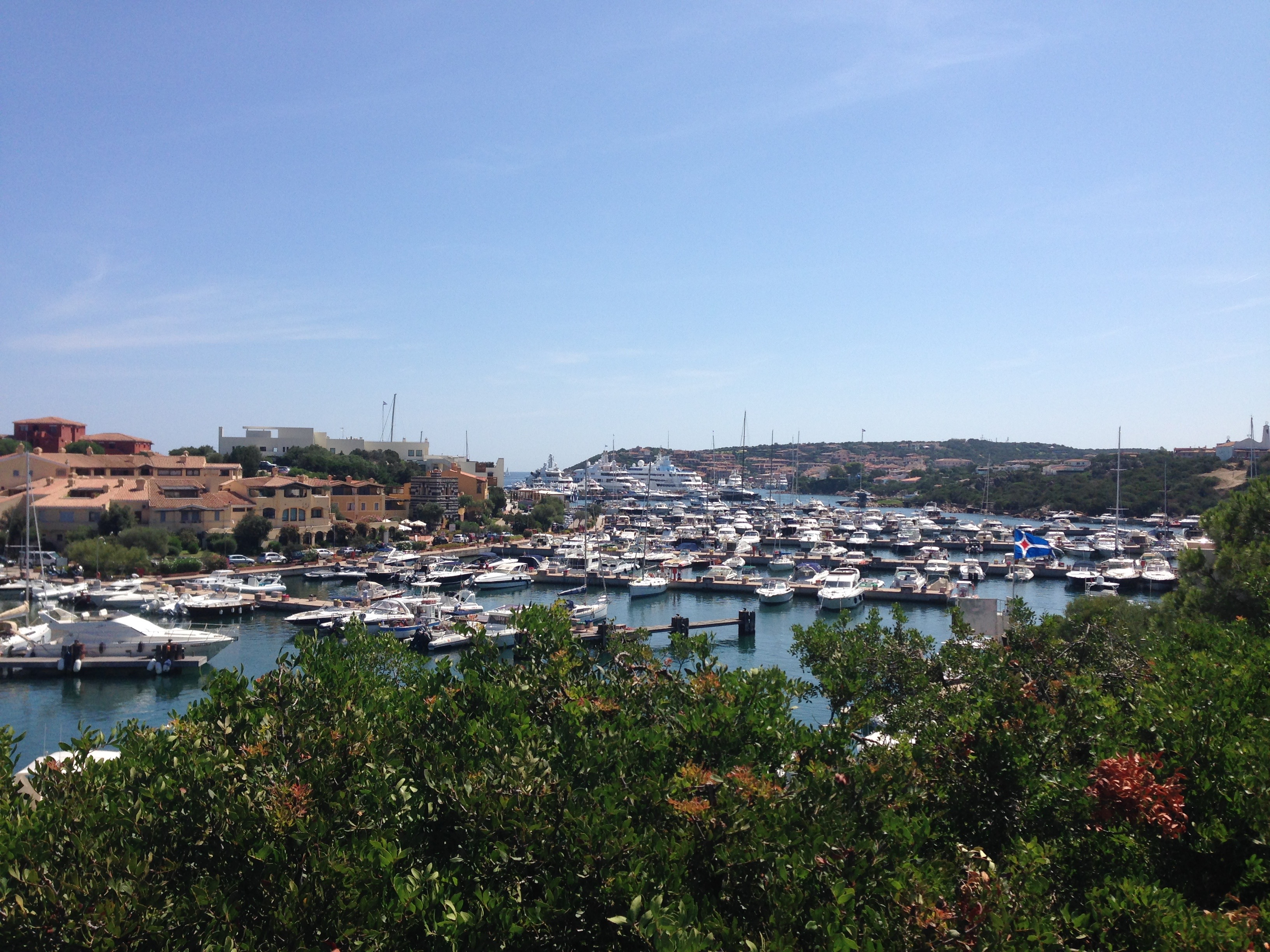
- View of Porto Cervo

- Location of Porto Cervo in Italy
- Coordinates: 41°19′N 9°36′E
- Country: Italy
- Region: Sardinia (SS)
- Province: Sassari
- Comune: Arzachena
- Elevation: 5 m (16 ft)

Population
  - Total: 421
- Time zone: UTC+1 (CET)
  - Summer (DST): UTC+2 (CEST)
- Postal code: 07021
- Dialing code: 0789

Porto Cervo (Italian pronunciation: [ˈpɔrto ˈtʃɛrvo]; lit. 'Deer's Port') is an Italian seaside resort in northern Sardinia. It is a frazione of the comune of Arzachena, in the Province of Gallura North-East Sardinia. Created by a group of foreign investors around the early 1960s, Porto Cervo is the main centre of Costa Smeralda. It has a resident population of 421 inhabitants. Porto Cervo has been named one of the most expensive resorts in the world, along with being a luxury yacht magnet and billionaires' playground.

== History ==
The village itself was designed in the 1950–1960s by architects and landscape designers such as Jacques Couelle, Luigi Vietti and Michele Busiri Vici.

== Geography ==
Porto Cervo lies in the northeastern corner of Sardinia, by the Tyrrhenian Coast, some km south of La Maddalena island. It is 17 km (11 mi) from Arzachena, 28 km (17 mi) from Olbia and 32 km (20 mi) from Palau.

== The Port ==
Porto Cervo has a well-equipped marina consisting of two ports: The Old Port (Porto Vecchio) and the Modern Marina.

The Porto Vecchio (old port) in the village of Porto Cervo and it was built in the 1960s as a fishing port. The modern marina lies to the west surrounded by the facilities of the marina village.

Porto Cervo Marina has 700 berths, with 100 slips reserved for megayachts, and accepts reservations.

== Tourism ==
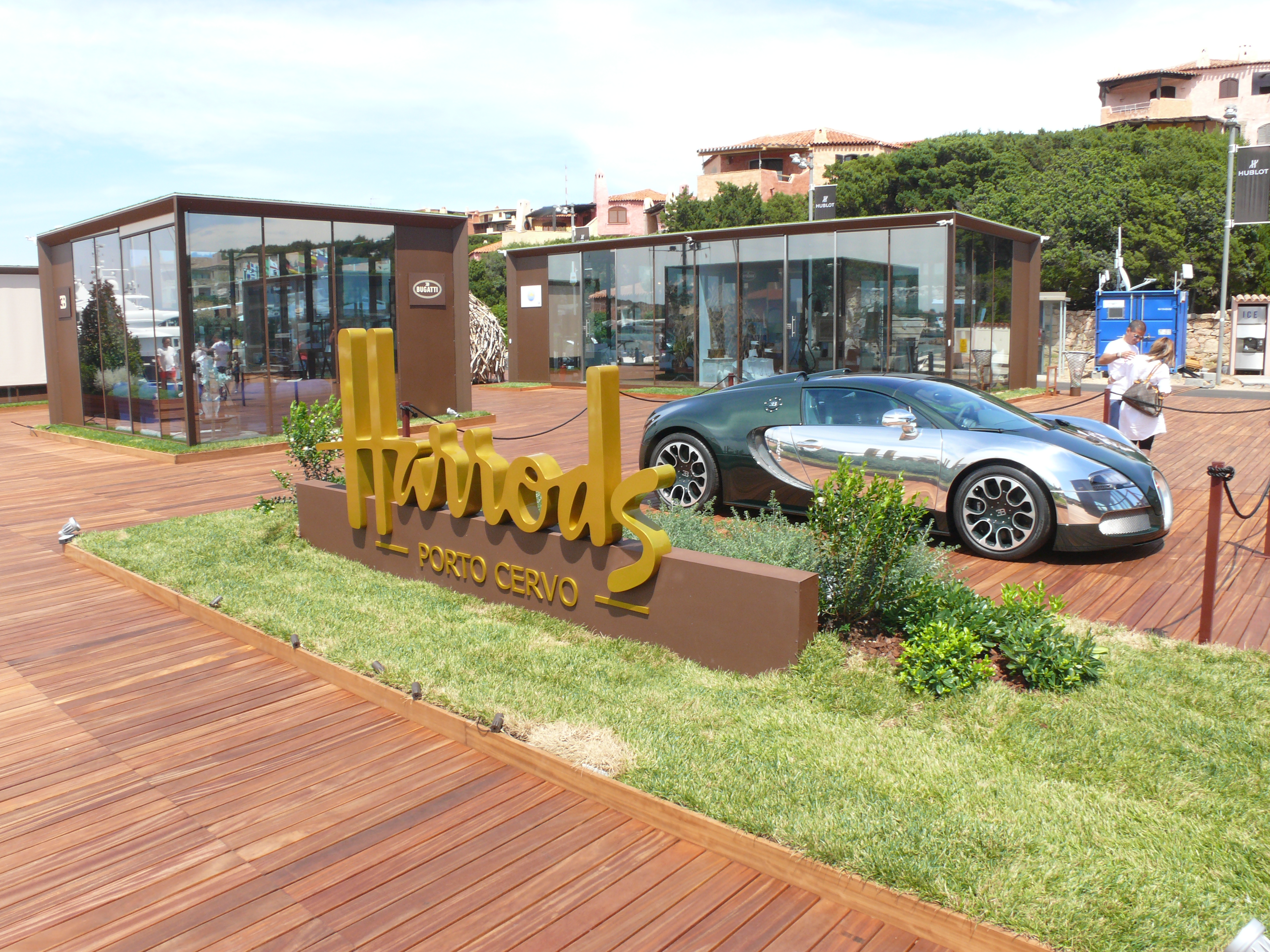
The Bugatti stand at Harrods Porto Cervo

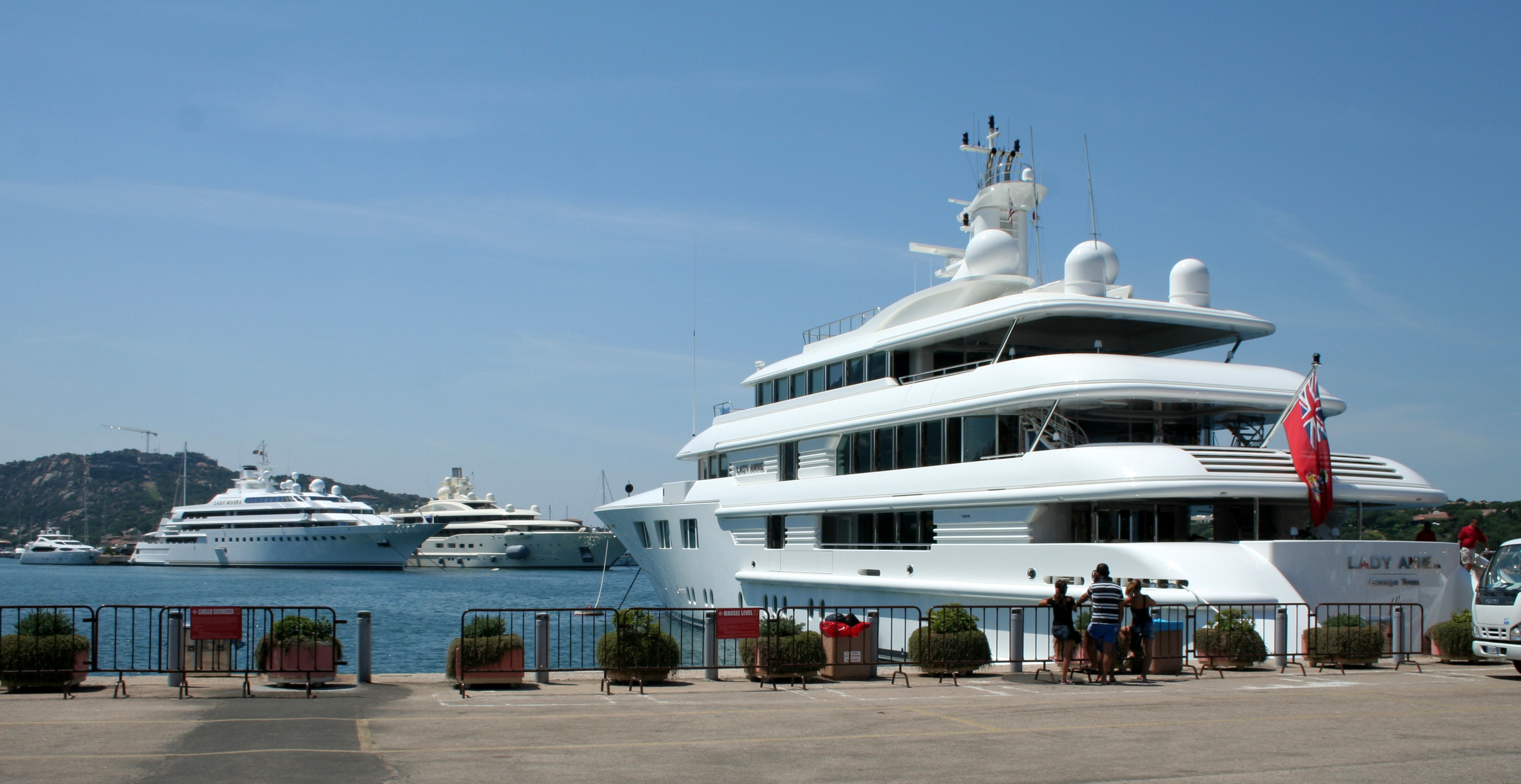
Three luxury yachts—Lady Anne, Lady Moura, and Pelorus, within the port of Porto Cervo

The village is located at the southern and eastern shore of the natural port, where there are shops, a newsagent, bars, restaurants and supermarkets. The other shores of the bay boast the old and the new marina. At the later is the club house of the exclusive Yacht Club Costa Smeralda. The end of the new marina holds a shipyard capable of repairing large luxury yachts.

In a study released by the European luxury real estate brokerage, Romazzino Bay in Porto Cervo is the most expensive location in Europe. House prices reach up to 300,000 euros per square meter.

In 2011 Costa Smeralda had the second, the 4th and the 6th most expensive hotels in the world, the Pitrizza, the Romazzino and the Cala di Volpe Hotel. In 2012 the Hotel Cala di Volpe, which is featured in the 1977 James Bond film The Spy Who Loved Me is listed at number 7 on World's 15 most expensive hotel suites compiled by CNN Go in 2012. The presidential suite of the hotel billed at US$32,736 per night.

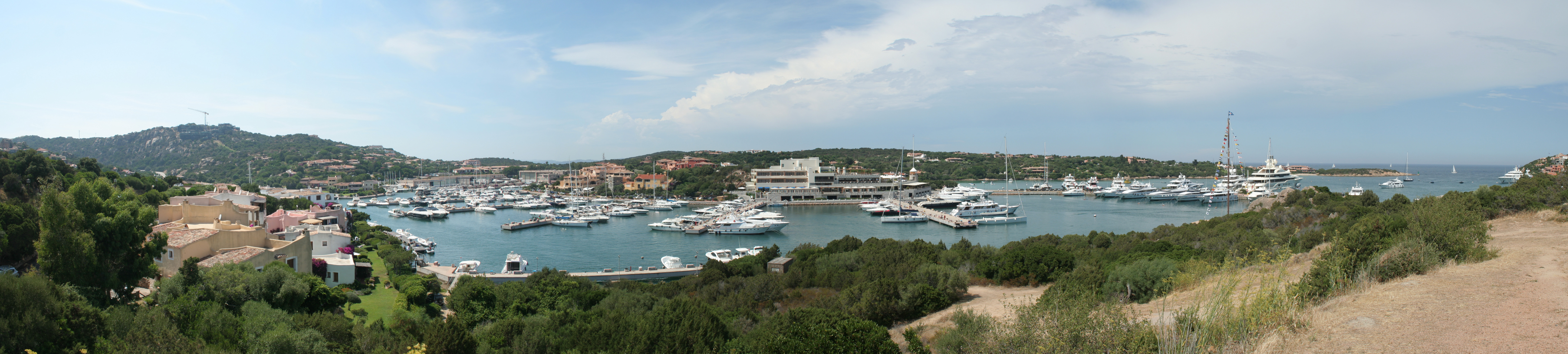
The Yacht Club Harbor in Porto Cervo
