= Carnival Sunday =

1945 film

- Directed by: Edgar Neville
- Written by: Edgar Neville
- Produced by: Edgar Neville
- Starring: Conchita Montes; Guillermo Marín
- Cinematography: Henri Barreyre (as Enrique Barreyre)
- Edited by: Mariano Pombo
- Music by: José Muñoz Molleda
- Release date: 22 October 1945
- Running time: 77 minutes
- Country: Spain
- Language: Spanish

Carnival Sunday (Spanish: Domingo de carnaval) is a 1945 Spanish crime film written, directed and produced by Edgar Neville.

== Plot ==
A greedy moneylender is murdered the same day that the carnival begins in Madrid. A watch seller, who owed a large amount to the old woman, is the main suspect in the crime. His daughter decides to investigate on her own.

== Cast ==
- Conchita Montes as Nieves
- Fernando Fernán Gómez as Matías
- Guillermo Marín as Gonzalo Fonseca
- Julia Lajos as Julia
- Fernando Aguirre (as Francisco Aguirre)
- Carlos Álvarez Segura
- Manuel Arbó as Emiliano
- Ildefonso Cuadrado (as S. Cuadrado)
- Ginés Gallego
- Francisco Hernández
- Julia Lajos
- Mariana Larrabeiti
- Jeffra Delionez
- Juana Mansó
- Manuel Requena
- Joaquín Roa as Nemesio
- Alicia Romay

== Bibliography ==
- Mira, Alberto. The A to Z of Spanish Cinema. Rowman & Littlefield, 2010.
