= María del Puy =

Spanish actresses (1941–2015)

- Born: María del Puy Alonso González; 1941; Pamplona, Spain
- Died: 25 November 2015 (aged 78); Madrid, Spain
- Occupation: Actress
- Awards: Ondas Award (1963)

María del Puy Alonso González (1941 – 25 November 2015), known artistically as María del Puy, was a Spanish actress.

== Biography ==
Titled in piano at the Madrid Royal Conservatory, María del Puy also pursued declamation studies at the Royal Superior School of Dramatic Art and at the Superior School of Cinema.

== Cinema ==
With some incursions into the cinema, her career was developed mainly in theater and television. On the big screen she worked under Edgar Neville in My Street (1960), with Luis César Amadori in My Last Tango (1960), and Fernando Fernán Gómez in Yo la vi primero (1974).

== Theater ==
On stage, she played dozens of characters, in productions such as Duck in Orange Sauce by William Douglas-Home (1972), Caimán by Antonio Buero Vallejo (1981), Un hombre en la puerta (1984), An Enemy of the People by Henrik Ibsen (1985), La puerta del ángel by José López Rubio and directed by Cayetano Luca de Tena (1986), Los tres etcéteras de Don Simón by José María Pemán (1997), and The Children's Hour, in a version by Fernando Méndez-Leite (2004).

== Dubbing ==
Beginning in 1956 she dubbed the voices of some of the most distinguished stars of international cinema, such as Shirley MacLaine, Liza Minnelli, Geraldine Chaplin, Ingrid Bergman, Jane Fonda, Katharine Hepburn, and Jaclyn Smith in the first season of Charlie's Angels.

== Radio ==
She worked in radio, as a voice actress and as a screenwriter, on Radio Intercontinental (1957–1958), Radio Nacional de España, and Radio Madrid.

== Television ==
Finally, she developed a prolific career in television, especially in the 1960s and 70s, during the apogee of televised theater. She had roles on dozens of classic shows such as Estudio 1 and Novela. Her work on the small screen earned her the Ondas Award in 1963.

=== Appearances ===
- Gran parada (1961)
- Cuarto de estar (1963)
- Novela
  - El amor lleva gafas de sol (9 June 1963)
  - La llama y la ceniza (28 March 1966)
  - Fue en Molokai (1 April 1968)
  - Biografía de Doña Jimena (9 February 1969)
  - Amor de sombras (8 July 1974)
  - Las cerezas del cementerio (11 April 1977)
  - El crimen de lord Arthur Savile (8 May 1978)
- Primera fila
  - Me casé con un ángel (12 July 1963)
  - La Navidad en la plaza (24 December 1963)
  - Casa con dos puertas, mala es de guardar (18 March 1964)
  - Proceso de Jesús (25 March 1964)
  - La Reine morte (27 May 1964)
  - Una muchachita de Valladolid (12 May 1965)
- La Noche al hablar
  - En la boca del león (10 January 1964)
- Historias de mi barrio
  - El psiquiatra (26 February 1964)
- Los Encuentros
  - De lo soñado a lo vivo (30 July 1966)
- Estudio 1
  - Bobosse (24 August 1966)
  - Son las doce, Doctor Schweitzer (19 December 1967)
  - The Curious Savage (19 March 1968)
  - The Winslow Boy (29 January 1970)
  - Eden End (26 November 1971)
  - El pensamiento (10 December 1971)
  - The Widow from Valencia (28 April 1975)
  - Hedda Gabler (10 November 1975)
  - Anna Christie (15 March 1976)
  - Celos del aire (25 April 1979)
  - Jano (16 December 1979) Jessica
  - Salsa picante (18 May 1980)
  - Cuatro historias de alquiler (3 January 1983)
  - Everything in the Garden (31 July 1984)
  - La mosca en la oreja (14 August 1984)
- Teatro de siempre
  - Andrómaca (13 February 1969)
  - La tejedora de sueños (30 March 1970)
- Diana en negro
  - La esposa del jugador (9 January 1970)
- Hora once
  - El crimen de lord Arthur Savile (13 February 1970)
- Personajes a trasluz
  - Macbeth (8 September 1970)
- Páginas sueltas
  - El último encuentro (24 November 1970)
- Ficciones
  - Katrina (6 January 1972)
  - Cuatro entrevistas (9 February 1974)
- El Teatro
  - I Have Been Here Before (7 October 1974)
- Mujeres insólitas
  - El ángel atosigador (1 February 1977)
- Teatro breve
  - Margot y el diablo (8 January 1981)
- Mourning Becomes Electra (1986)
- La comedia dramática española
  - El vuelo de la cometa (21 August 1986)
  - La Puerta del Ángel (2 October 1986)
- El comisario
  - El infierno de Dante (14 January 2005)
