= The Last Horse =

- Spanish DVD cover
- Directed by: Edgar Neville
- Written by: Edgar Neville
- Produced by: Edgar Neville
- Starring: Fernando Fernán Gómez
- Cinematography: César Fraile
- Edited by: Edgar Neville
- Music by: José Muñoz Molleda
- Distributed by: E. Neville, Procines Los Films del Buho
- Release date: 23 November 1950
- Running time: 85 minutes
- Country: Spain
- Language: Spanish

The Last Horse (Spanish:El último caballo) is a 1950 Spanish comedy film directed by Edgar Neville starring Fernando Fernán Gómez.

== Plot ==
Fernando, the protagonist, finishes his military service in the cavalry and decides to buy the horse that has been his companion during this time. However, living with the horse becomes a grave problem, as the city that Fernando knew is not the same. He struggles to find accommodation for the animal, and he faces resistance from both his social circle and the new, modern world.

== Cast ==
- Fernando Fernán Gómez as Fernando
- Conchita Montes as Isabel
- José Luis Ozores as Simón, el Bombero
- Mary Lamar
- Julia Lajos
- Fernando Aguirre
- Manuel Arbó
- Manuel Aguilera
- Julia Caba Alba as Julia
- María Cañete
- Benito Cobeña
- Casimiro Hurtado
- Manuel de Juan
- Arturo Marín
- Manuel Miranda

== Bibliography ==
- Mira, Alberto. The A to Z of Spanish Cinema. Rowman & Littlefield, 2010.
