= Nada (1947 film) =

- Spanish film poster
- Directed by: Edgar Neville
- Written by: Conchita Montes
- Starring: Conchita Montes; Fosco Giachetti
- Cinematography: Manuel Berenguer
- Music by: José Muñoz Molleda
- Distributed by: CIFESA
- Release date: 1947
- Running time: 76 minutes (originally 110 minutes)
- Countries: Spain; Italy
- Language: Spanish

Nada is a 1947 Spanish drama film directed by Edgar Neville. It is based on Carmen Laforet's famous novel Nada which won the Premio Nadal. It was written by Carmen Laforet.

The novel was filmed also in Argentina in (1956) by Leopoldo Torre Nilsson with the title Graciela.

Although the film is an entirely Spanish production, the cast includes some Italian actors: Fosco Giachetti, María Denis, Adriano Rimoldi.

The film was censored and cut by 34 minutes, so credited actors such as Félix Navarro, María Bru and Rafael Bardem disappeared from the film. The role of José María Mompín was hardly reduced. Most of the Barcelona exteriors were removed.

== Cast ==
- Conchita Montes as Andrea
- Fosco Giachetti as Román
- Tomás Blanco as Juan
- Mary Delgado as Gloria
- María Cañete as Angustias
- Julia Caba Alba as Antonia
- María Denis as Ena
- Adriano Rimoldi as Jaime
