= Conchita Montes =

Spanish actress (1914–1994)

- Born: 13 March 1914; Spain
- Died: 18 October 1994 (aged 80)
- Years active: 1940–1992

Conchita Montes (13 March 1914 – 18 October 1994) was a Spanish film actress.

== Career ==
Born in Madrid, Montes became a popular actress in Spanish films of the 1940s and 1950s. In 1950 she starred in El último caballo, an Edgar Neville film in which she starred alongside Fernando Fernán Gómez.

However, after 1960 she mostly appeared in Spanish television until her eventual retirement in 1992. She died in 1994.

== Filmography ==
Year	Title	Role	Notes
1939	Carmen fra i rossi	Carmen	
1942	Sancta Maria	Nadia	
1942	Correo de Indias	Virreina del Perú	
1943	Misterio en la marisma		
1943	Café de París		
1945	La vida en un hilo	Mercedes	
1945	Domingo de carnaval	Nieves	
1946	El crimen de la calle Bordadores		
1947	Nada	Andrea Ramos Brunet	also wrote the screenplay
1948	El marqués de Salamanca	María Buschenthal	
1950	My Beloved Juan	Eloísa Palacios	
1950	El último caballo	Isabel, florista	
1951	Cuento de hadas	Cristal	
1952	Devil's Roundup	Eva	
1954	Roots	The City Woman	(segment "Las vacas")
1959	El baile	Adela / Adelita	
1960	Mi calle	Julia	
1963	55 Days at Peking	Mme Gaumaire	
1968	Solos los dos	Madre de Marisol	
1972	What the Peeper Saw	Sophie	
1978	La escopeta nacional	Soledad	
1978	Striptease	Condesa	Uncredited
1982	Un pasota con corbata		
1985	La esclava blanca		
1989	Testigo azul		
1990	Una mujer bajo la lluvia	Tía Amparitxu	
1991	El tiempo de Neville	Herself	
