= The Bullfighter's Suit =

1947 film by Edgar Neville

- Directed by: Edgar Neville
- Written by: El Caballero Audaz (novel); Edgar Neville
- Starring: José Nieto; José Prada
- Cinematography: Henri Barreyre
- Edited by: Jacques Saint-Léonard
- Music by: José Muñoz Molleda
- Production company: CIFESA
- Distributed by: CIFESA
- Release date: 19 May 1947
- Running time: 108 minutes
- Country: Spain
- Language: Spanish

The Bullfighter's Suit (Spanish: El traje de luces) is a 1947 Spanish drama film directed by Edgar Neville and starring José Nieto and José Prada. The film is set in the world of bullfighting and presents a more downbeat view of the sport in contrast to other films of the era that tended to be more celebratory. The title refers to Traje de luces, the traditional toreador's costume.

== Synopsis ==
A young bullfighter full of illusions triumphs in Mexico and decides to get married there and forget about his old Spanish girlfriend, who by then has just given birth to his son.

== Cast ==
- Ricardo Acero
- Julia Caba Alba
- Alfonso de Córdoba
- Nani Fernandez
- Casimiro Hurtado
- Mary Lamar
- José Nieto
- José Prada
- Rafael Romero Marchent

== Bibliography ==
- Bentley, Bernard. A Companion to Spanish Cinema. Boydell & Brewer 2008.
