= Life on a Thread =

1945 film

- Spanish theatrical release poster
- Directed by: Edgar Neville
- Written by: Edgar Neville
- Produced by: Edgar Neville
- Starring: Conchita Montes; Rafael Durán; Guillermo Marín
- Cinematography: Henri Barreyre (as Enrique Barreyre)
- Edited by: Mariano Pombo
- Music by: José Muñoz Molleda
- Release date: 26 April 1945
- Running time: 92 minutes
- Country: Spain
- Language: Spanish

Life on a Thread (Spanish:La vida en un hilo) is a 1945 Spanish comedy film written, directed and produced by Edgar Neville. Neville later modified the film for the stage, with an adaptation of the same name.

It was remade twice, as a Mexican film La engañadora in 1955, directed by José Díaz Morales and as Spanish film titled Una mujer bajo la lluvia in 1992 directed by Gerardo Vera.

== Cast ==
- Conchita Montes as Mercedes
- Rafael Durán as Miguel Ángel
- Guillermo Marín as Ramón
- Julia Lajos as Madame Dupont
- Alicia Romay as Isabel
- Juana Mansó as Escolástica (as Juanita Mansó)
- Joaquín Roa as Contacos
- María Brú as Doña Encarnación
- Eloísa Muro as Doña Purificación
- Julia Pachelo as Mariana
- Manuel París as Marchante
- Enrique Herreros as Taxista
- César de Nueda as Amigacho
- Rosario Royo
- Josefina de la Torre
- Joaquina Maroto
- María Saco
- Carlos Álvarez Segura
- Manuel Ocaña as Arrigurrita
- Kurt Dogan as Violinista

== Bibliography ==
- Mira, Alberto (2010). The A to Z of Spanish Cinema. Rowman & Littlefield. ISBN 9780810876224.
