= As Long as You Live =

1955 film

- Directed by: Harald Reinl
- Written by: J. Joachim Bartsch; Harald Reinl
- Produced by: H.P. Fritsch
- Starring: Adrian Hoven; Marianne Koch; Karin Dor
- Cinematography: Walter Riml
- Edited by: Gertrud Petermann; J. Joachim Bartsch
- Music by: José Muñoz Molleda
- Production company: EVA-Film
- Distributed by: RKO Radio Pictures
- Release date: 14 October 1955
- Running time: 103 minutes
- Country: West Germany
- Language: German

As Long as You Live (German: Solange du lebst) is a 1955 West German war film directed by Harald Reinl and starring Adrian Hoven, Marianne Koch and Karin Dor. It was made at the Wiesbaden Studios and on location in Seville, Granada and the Sierra Nevada. It is set during the Spanish Civil War, which is seen from a pro-Nationalist viewpoint.

== Cast ==
- Adrian Hoven as Michael
- Marianne Koch as Teresa
- Karin Dor as Pepita
- Willy Rösner as Buergermeister Torquito
- Kurt Heintel as Kommissar Malek
- Sepp Rist as Pepe
- Werner Stock as Manolo
- Kurt Hepperlin as Doctor
- Luis Arroyo as Escosura
- Juan Cortés as Moreno
- Rosario Cortés as Tänzerin
- Felipe Calvo

== Bibliography ==
- Bock, Hans-Michael; Bergfelder, Tim, eds. (2009). The Concise Cinegraph: Encyclopaedia of German Cinema. New York: Berghahn Books. ISBN 978-1-57181-655-9.
