= List of Spanish films of the 1950s =

Films produced in Spain in the 1950s ordered by year of release on separate pages:

== List of films by year ==
- Spanish films of 1950
- Spanish films of 1951
- Spanish films of 1952
- Spanish films of 1953
- Spanish films of 1954
- Spanish films of 1955
- Spanish films of 1956
- Spanish films of 1957
- Spanish films of 1958
- Spanish films of 1959
