= The Dance (1959 film) =

- Theatrical release poster
- Directed by: Edgar Neville
- Written by: Edgar Neville
- Produced by: José Antonio Irrysarry
- Starring: Conchita Montes; Alberto Closas; Rafael Alonso
- Cinematography: José F. Aguayo
- Edited by: José Antonio Rojo
- Music by: Gustavo Pittaluga
- Distributed by: Carabela Films
- Release date: 17 December 1959
- Running time: 91 minutes
- Country: Spain
- Language: Spanish

The Dance (Spanish: El baile) is a 1959 Spanish comedy-drama film written and directed by Edgar Neville. It is based on his own theatrical play, El baile, released in (1952), which won the Spanish Premio Nacional de Literatura award.

It was the second and last color film directed by Neville after Duende y misterio del flamenco.

== Plot ==
Pedro (Alberto Closas) and Julián (Rafael Alonso) are friends and they love the same woman, Adela (Conchita Montes). Madrid, 1905, Pedro and Adela had gotten married but Julian live with them. 1930. Adela discovers she is going to die and the two men had hidden the illness. 1955. Adelita (Conchita Montes), Adela's grand daughter, visits to the two men and they remember their love to Adele.

== Cast ==
- Conchita Montes as Adela / Adelita
- Alberto Closas as Pedro
- Rafael Alonso as Julián

== Bibliography ==
- Mira, Alberto. The A to Z of Spanish Cinema. Rowman & Littlefield, 2010.
