= Oh... Rosalinda!! =

- theatrical release poster
- Directed by: Michael Powell; Emeric Pressburger
- Written by: Michael Powell; Emeric Pressburger
- Produced by: Michael Powell; Emeric Pressburger
- Starring: Michael Redgrave; Mel Ferrer; Anthony Quayle; Ludmilla Tchérina; Anton Walbrook; Dennis Price; Anneliese Rothenberger
- Cinematography: Christopher Challis
- Edited by: Reginald Mills
- Music by: Johann Strauss (music); Dennis Arundell (lyrics)
- Distributed by: Associated British–Pathé
- Release date: 18 November 1955
- Running time: 101 minutes
- Country: United Kingdom
- Language: English
- Budget: £276,328 or £255,445
- Box office: £95,833

Oh... Rosalinda!! (also known as Die Fledermaus) is a 1955 British musical comedy film by the British director-writer team of Michael Powell and Emeric Pressburger. The film stars Michael Redgrave, Mel Ferrer, Anthony Quayle, Ludmilla Tchérina and Anton Walbrook and features Anneliese Rothenberger and Dennis Price.

The film is based on the 1874 operetta Die Fledermaus (The Bat) by Johann Strauss, but updated to take place in post-war Vienna as occupied by the four Allied powers: the United States, the United Kingdom, France and the USSR. The music, played by the Vienna Symphony Orchestra under conductor Alois Melichar, has new lyrics by Dennis Arundell, and professional singers dubbed for some of the actors. The choreography is by Alfred Rodrigues, and the production was designed by Hein Heckroth.

As the film closes in the early hours at the party at the hotel, Falke points the message to the representatives of the four powers, while thanking them for their presence: "even the dearest friend loses his attraction if he overstays.... so if you don't mind, go home, please go home"; at which the waltz "Brüderlein, Brüderlein und Schwesterlein"/"Brothers, brothers and sisters" ('Be my friend') starts up.

Oh... Rosalinda!! is a light-hearted Technicolor romp that makes full use of the new CinemaScope process, and is not just a film of a staged production but a filmic operetta.

== Plot ==
In 1955 Vienna, during its post-war occupation, the black-market dealer Dr. Falke moves freely through the French, British, American and Russian sectors, dealing in champagne and caviar amongst the highest echelons of the allied powers. After a costume party, French Colonel Gabriel Eisenstein plays a practical joke on a drunken Falke, depositing him, asleep and dressed as a bat, in the lap of a patriotic Russian statue, to be discovered the following morning by irate Russian soldiers. Falke is nearly arrested until his friend General Orlofsky of the USSR intervenes. A vengeful Falke plans an elaborate practical joke on his friend, involving Orlofsky, British Major Frank who is sent to escort the French colonel to jail for his misdemeanor, Eisenstein's beautiful wife Rosalinda, her maid Adele and a masked ball where no one is who they seem.

Complicating matters is American Captain Alfred Westerman, an old flame of Rosalinda who is determined to take advantage of her husband's absence, deliberately taking the hotel room next to hers. When Major Frank, arriving to take Eisenstein into custody, catches Alfred in Rosalinda's room, in Eisenstein's dressing gown, he takes Alfred to be Eisenstein and arrests him (Alfred) instead. To avoid scandal, Alfred does nothing to disabuse Frank of his error. Later that evening, at the masked ball hosted by Orlofsky, Adele, wearing one of her mistress's gowns, is spotted by Eisenstein, who is unable to do anything about it (as he is supposed already to be in jail and is attending the ball only with the connivance of Orlofsky, at Falke's instigation) and she catches the eye of both Orlofsky and Frank. When the masked Rosalinda arrives, Eisenstein pursues her but she flees with his watch – which Falke slyly tells him will reappear again at his home.

At midnight, Eisenstein presents himself at the jail but when he finds Alfred there, still in his (Eisenstein's) dressing gown, he (Eisenstein) realizes that Alfred must have been courting Rosalinda at their hotel, so he rushes back there to confront her, followed by Alfred and Frank, the mistaken identity having been uncovered. She retorts by showing him the watch he had given her at the ball, and he begs forgiveness. All this is overhead by the rest of Orlofsky's party guests (who have all found their way back to the hotel) and Falke admits that he was behind the charade. As all sing and dance, Alfred allows himself to be re-arrested in Eisenstein's place.

== Cast ==
- Anthony Quayle as General Orlovsky
- Anton Walbrook as Dr. Falke
- Dennis Price as Major Frank
- Ludmilla Tchérina as Rosalinda
- Michael Redgrave as Colonel Eisenstein
- Mel Ferrer as Captain Alfred Westerman
- Anneliese Rothenberger as Adele
- Oskar Sima as Frosch
- Richard Marner as Colonel Lebotov
- Nicholas Bruce as hotel receptionist
- Arthur Mullard as Russian guard

Singing voices:

- Sári Barabás as Rosalinda
- Alexander Young as Captain Alfred
- Denis Dowling as Major Frank
- Walter Berry as Dr. Falke

Cast notes: Among the ladies, gentlemen and dancers of the cast were John Schlesinger, Peter Darrell, Joyce Blair and Jill Ireland. On some websites Roy Kinnear is listed in the cast, no role specified, but not on the BFI Screenonline page.

== Production ==
Following Tales of Hoffmann, Powell and Pressburger considered a biographical film about Richard Strauss based around the opera Der Rosenkavalier, Pressburger's favourite opera, but screenplay drafts were not successful in attracting finance. They then turned to Die Fledermaus, although Powell was not familiar with it. Going to Vienna to see a production there, their flight was re-directed to the Russian-controlled sector of the city and the delay meant that they only got to the performance in the British sector in time for the curtain calls, although this gave them ideas for the plot of their adaptation.

Powell and Pressburger had suffered through four box office disappointments in a row before this film, which is one reason that Bing Crosby, Maurice Chevalier and Orson Welles were approached about playing the roles of Alfred, Eisenstein and Orlovsky – and Oh... Rosalinda!! too was not commercially successful. Arundell had already worked with Powell and Pressburger, providing a translation for the film The Tales of Hoffmann. A reviewer of the 2019 Network British Film DVD restoration however notes Heckroth's “stagey expressionism”, “dazzling cinematography aplenty”, and suggests that it prefigures “political operetta deconstructions” of more recent years.

Filming, delayed by a year, started in early 1955, and as the finance was not all ready, Walbrook and Ferrer at first only received part of their contract fees. Oh... Rosalinda was filmed at Elstree Studios in Borehamwood, Hertfordshire, and on location in London. Oh... Rosalinda!! was one of the first films to be made in CinemaScope.

Several of the singing cast would later appear on stage and record in the original piece; Rothenberger and Barabás together sang in excerpts from the operetta for Electrola around the time of the film, and Rothenberger made further full recordings under Hollreiser (1960), Danon (1964) and Boskovsky (1971), for the latter switching to Rosalinde. Walter Berry made five recordings of Fledermaus - singing Frank (1959, 1964, 1971) and Falke (1960, video 1980). Walbrook had played Strauss in Walzerkrieg in 1933, and in Wiener Walzer in 1951, both German-language films.

Oh... Rosalinda!! did not manage to get a general theatrical release and a potential sale to television came to nothing. A record of musical excerpts derived from the soundtrack of the film was issued on Nixa LP NLP 18001.

A restoration from the 35mm CinemaScope original camera negative was undertaken prior to a Blu-ray and DVD re-issue in 2019; this included automated and manual dirt and damage removal and correction of instability, warping and density fluctuation.

== Reception ==
The Monthly Film Bulletin wrote: "A light and amusing idea – to set Die Fledermaus in modern Vienna – is here trampled under elephantine treatment. The plot loses itself in hopeless convolutions; the presentation of songs and comedy alike is wearily heavy; the design is a scrapbook of a sort of Teutonic House-and-Garden contemporary. Three artists emerge with credit – Anton Walbrook (who is particularly clever in his delivery of the prologue to the film), Anneliese Rothenberger, as a very jolly Adele, and Anthony Quayle as the Russian general – while Michael Redgrave capers with, one feels, more goodwill than enjoyment. Redgrave, Rothenberger and Quayle sing their own parts with accomplishment; the other roles are dubbed with varying success. The music (with admirable new lyrics by Dennis Arundell) is well performed by the Vienna Symphony Orchestra, and survives with the charm of its melodies intact."

Kine Weekly wrote: "The piquant trifle, which incidentally makes sport of power politics without generating heat, is not only flawlessly acted by its international all-star cast, but also brilliantly sung and magnificently staged. Vintage champagne, bottled in England, it should delight the palate of connoisseur and ninepenny alike. ... The picture creates convincing Continental atmosphere and moves with a merry swing from start to finish."

Variety wrote: "Anthony Quayle supplies the requisite sombre touch to the character of the Russian officer who mellows under the influence of champagne and dames. Dennis Price makes a striking contrast as his British counterpart, Anneliese Rothenberger sings and acts vivaciously as the truant lady's maid and the other singing roles are competently handled. Camerawork is artistic and the direction is suitably adjusted to the picturebook atmosphere and satirical vein."

Leslie Halliwell wrote "Lumbering attempt to modernise Die Fledermaus, unsuitably wide-screen and totally lacking the Lubitsch touch. A monumental step in the decline of these producers, and a sad stranding of a brilliant cast."
