= My Street (film) =

- Directed by: Edgar Neville
- Written by: Edgar Neville
- Produced by: Pere Portabella as Pedro Portabella
- Starring: Conchita Montes; Adolfo Marsillach
- Cinematography: José F. Aguayo
- Edited by: José Antonio Rojo
- Music by: Manuel Parada
- Release date: 21 November 1960
- Running time: 91 minutes
- Country: Spain
- Language: Spanish

My Street (Spanish:Mi calle) is a 1960 Spanish drama film written and directed by Edgar Neville.

== Cast ==
- Tota Alba
- Rafael Alonso as Pablo López
- Ángel Álvarez
- Mariano Azaña
- Rafael Bardem
- Héctor Bianciotti
- Roberto Camardiel
- Susana Campos
- Lina Canalejas
- Antonio Casal as Lesmes
- Carlos Casaravilla
- Ana María Custodio
- Julia Delgado Caro
- Ángel del Pozo
- María del Puy
- Agustín González as Fabricio
- María Isbert as Reme (as Maruja Isbert)
- Katia Loritz as Carmela
- Adolfo Marsillach as Gonzalo
- Antonio Martínez
- Nati Mistral
- Conchita Montes as Julia
- Gracita Morales as Purita
- Pedro Porcel
- George Rigaud (as Jorge Rigaud)
- Cándido Rodríguez
- Fernando Sanclemente
- Antonio Vela as Gonzalito

== Bibliography ==
- Mira, Alberto. The A to Z of Spanish Cinema. Rowman & Littlefield, 2010.
