= Take Me to Hollywood =

1931 film

- Directed by: Edgar Neville
- Written by: Edgar Neville
- Cinematography: Agustín Macasoli
- Music by: Luis Patiño
- Production company: Star Film
- Release date: 20 June 1931
- Country: Spain
- Language: Spanish

Take Me to Hollywood (Spanish:Yo quiero que me lleven a Hollywood) is a 1931 Spanish comedy film directed by Edgar Neville, starring Perlita Greco. It was one of the earliest Spanish sound films.

== Status ==
The film is now considered lost; remain only a few production stills and the score of the main song, quite popular at the time of the release.

== Bibliography ==
- Labanyi, Jo & Pavlović, Tatjana. A Companion to Spanish Cinema. John Wiley & Sons, 2012.
