= The Crime of Bordadores Street =

1946 film

- Directed by: Edgar Neville
- Written by: Edgar Neville
- Starring: Manuel Luna; Mary Delgado
- Cinematography: Henri Barreyre (as Enrique Barreyre)
- Edited by: Bienvenida Sanz
- Music by: José Muñoz Molleda
- Release date: 21 October 1946
- Running time: 92 minutes
- Country: Spain
- Language: Spanish

The Crime of Bordadores Street (Spanish: El crimen de la calle Bordadores) is a 1946 Spanish crime film written and directed by Edgar Neville. It is set in Madrid at the end of the 19th century and based on a true story, the Fuencarral Street Case.

== Cast ==
- Manuel Luna as Miguel Campos
- Mary Delgado as Lola, "la billetera"
- Antonia Plana as Petra
- Julia Lajos as doña Mariana
- Rafael Calvo
- José Prada as abogado
- José Franco

== Bibliography ==
- Mira, Alberto. The A to Z of Spanish Cinema. Rowman & Littlefield, 2010.
