= Perlita Greco =

American actress (1906–2001)

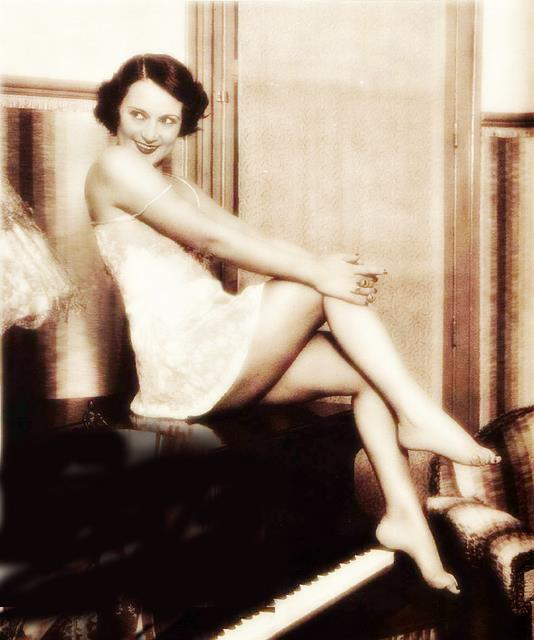
Perlita Greco (1934)

Perlita Greco (née Alfonsina Grecco Constantini; May 11, 1906, Rosario, Santa Fe, Argentina – February 26, 2001, New York City, New York) was an Argentine-born actress, vedette, tango singer, and cabaret singer.

She became a Spanish citizen in 1930 and U.S. citizen in 1946. She made her U. S. stage debut at the Rainbow Room, New York City.

== Selected filmography ==
- Take Me to Hollywood (1931)
