= Honeymoon (1959 film) =

1959 film by Michael Powell

- UK poster
- Directed by: Michael Powell
- Written by: Gregorio Martínez Sierra (ballet); Michael Powell; Luis Escobar
- Produced by: Michael Powell; Cesáreo González
- Starring: Anthony Steel; Ludmilla Tchérina; Antonio
- Cinematography: Georges Périnal; Claude Renoir
- Edited by: Peter Taylor; John Victor-Smith
- Music by: Manuel de Falla; Mikis Theodorakis
- Distributed by: Suevia Films
- Release dates: 29 March 1959 (Spain); 8 February 1962 (UK)
- Running time: 109 minutes 105 minutes (restored version)
- Country: United Kingdom / Spain
- Language: English / Spanish

Honeymoon (Spanish: Luna de miel) is a 1959 film by the British director-writer Michael Powell based in part on the ballet El Amor Brujo by Manuel de Falla. The film stars Anthony Steel, Ludmilla Tchérina and Spanish ballet dancer Antonio, and features Léonide Massine.

The film functions as a travelogue around Spain with dance interludes, mainly set to the repeated theme of "The Honeymoon Song" by Mikis Theodorakis. Performed in the film by Marino Marini and his quartet, it was subsequently recorded by many performers, including the Beatles.

It is one of Powell's least regarded movies.

== Plot ==
Ballet dancer Anna Cato (Ludmilla Tchérina) has just given up the ballet to marry Australian farmer Kit Kelly (Anthony Steel). They are touring Spain in their open top Bentley for their honeymoon before going to live on the sheep station that Kit runs in Australia.

An American car races past them at high speed but it soon has to stop to change a burst tyre. The car is driven by the famous Spanish dancer Antonio and his wife Rosita Candelas (Rosita Sergova). They are a fiery couple, always arguing and when Antonio goes down to a stream to wash up after changing the tyre, Rosita drives away without him. Antonio, stranded in the middle of nowhere, starts dancing down the road in his well-known Zapateado.

Kit and Anna drive by and offer Antonio a lift. They drive in to the "Tavern del Toro", where Antonio is known, and start to eat a wonderful breakfast. Antonio thinks he has seen Anna before but she says that this is her first trip to Spain. One old lady pushes forward her daughter who she wants to dance for Antonio. Lucia (Carmen Rojas) dances the El Macarona flamenco but then Antonio asks the musicians to play El Taranto to really see what she can do.

Rosita turns up at the end of the flamenco and another argument ensues, so Kit and Anna slip away. After a delightful meal they retire to their room where Anna does her best to distract Kit from his book on Fertility and Animal Breeding. Next day, after a bit more travelling around, Kit and Anna enter a bar – only to find Antonio is already there. They are introduced to the "cocktail set" and discover who Antonio is.

Anna goes to Antonio's studio where they are rehearsing his new dance, Los amantes de Teruel (The Lovers of Teruel), as a classical ballet but with a Spanish style. When Anna makes some suggestions to help the pas de deux Antonio realises she is a dancer and at last discovers who she really is. As Anna dances with Antonio neither are aware that Kit has come to the studio and is watching, not very pleased that his wife is dancing again.

Kit and Anna travel south to see the painting "The Burial of the Count of Orgaz" by El Greco. Kit declares that that is how Antonio's ballet should be staged. They then visit the Mosque at Córdoba and other places.

Early the next morning Kit goes off to help a breeder of bulls with his round-up and Anna is taken to the Alhambra at Granada by Antonio. They dance around the palace in a light hearted flirtation and Anna declares that she really has given up the ballet and is willing to settle down with Kit. Antonio isn't so sure. When they go to join Kit there is a mild confrontation between Kit and Antonio. The film is building up to the two men representing Don Diego and Don Pedro, competing for the attentions of Doña Isabel in the story of Les amantes de Teruel which will be the finalé of the film.

Kit and Anna go to see a performance of El Amor Brujo (Bewitched Love). The story is that of a girl whose lover had died but who now haunts her and prevents her from getting on with her life and her new lover. The lead roles are danced by Antonio and Rosita, with a cameo from Léonide Massine as the ghost – Massine was over sixty years old at the time – and Lucia as the girl's friend who tries to lure the ghost away. The restored version contains the full ballet, a mixture of classical ballet and flamenco style.

The next night, in Teruel, the guide (the voice of Michael Powell) explains the legend of the lovers of Teruel to Kit and Anna as they stand on the terrace looking at the statues. But Anna falls ill and develops a fever. In her fevered imagination she hallucinates the story of the Lovers of Teruel as a great ballet, with herself dancing the part of Doña Isabel and Antonio as Don Diego, her lover. Again a mix of classical ballet and Spanish style, with Antonio in Moorish make-up. The restoration contains the full ballet to the music of Manuel de Falla. The final funeral has the echoes of the El Greco painting the couple saw earlier.

The next morning Antonio comes to visit Anna, now in the hospital with Kit by her side. We learn that Anna and Kit will be off to Australia in a few days and Kit thinks that at last they have seen the last of Antonio. But no, he tells them he is starting a world tour!

== Cast ==
- Anthony Steel as Kit Kelly
- Ludmilla Tchérina as Anna
- Antonio as Antonio
- Léonide Massine as "Der Geist"
- Rosita Segovia as Rosita Candelas
- Carmen Rojas as Lucia
- María Gámez as Pepe Nieto
- Diego Hurtado as Pepe Nieto
- Juan Carmona as Pepe Nieto
- María Carla Alcalá as Soloist

Cast notes:

- Director Michael Powell's voice is used in the film for the guide describing the Lovers of Teruel.

== Music ==
Music used in Luna de miel includes:

- "Antonio's Zapateado" – composed by Sarasate, arranged by Leonard Salzedo
- "Honeymoon Song" – composed by Mikis Theodorakis, lyrics by William Sansom, arranged by Angela Morley (as Wally Stott), performed by Marino Marini and his quartet
- El Amor Brujo (ballet) – music by Manuel de Falla, story by Gregorio Martínez Sierra, choreography by Antonio
- Los amantes de Teruel (ballet) – music by Mikis Theodorakis

== Production ==
After his partnership with Emeric Pressburger ended, Michael Powell looked around for other projects and was enticed to Spain to make a film that, it was hoped, would do for flamenco and Spanish ballet what The Red Shoes had done for ballet. There were many problems during the production, mainly due to the lack of available finances. In one non-fiscal incident, Powell's car was stolen and as the thieves were chased they crashed the car and died in the crash.

Powell wrote in his memoirs that Luis Escobar wrote the lead roles for Moira Shearer and Paul Scofield who turned it down. They ended up with Ludmilla Tcherina and Anthony Steel. "Good God... not Anthony Steel," wrote Powell, "the archetypal British shit. He was already grooming himself for the part of the English baronet, Sir Stephen in The Story of O and he brought Anita Ekberg with him too."

== Awards and honours ==
At the 1959 Cannes Film Festival, Luna de miel won the Technical Grand Prize. Also, director Michael Powell was nominated for the Golden Palm Award.

== Subsequent history ==
Ludmilla Tchérina liked the final ballet, Los Amantes de Teruel, so much that she incorporated it into her regular stage performances. With the help of director Raymond Rouleau, it was turned into a film Les Amants de Teruel (1962).

The film was cut for television in the UK, and this version was the only one available for many years. The cuts were mainly to some of the extended dance sequences, leaving it as little more than a travelogue. This led to the film getting a bad reputation.

The film was fully restored from its original elements by Charles Doble of Somerset, and the restored film had its first public screening at the San Sebastián Film Festival in 2002 in the presence of Rosita Sergova, one of the stars of the film. It was first shown in the UK in Ashbrittle, Somerset on 21 June 2003.

In 1963, the Beatles recorded the theme tune for the BBC radio show 'Pop Go The Beatles'.

Welsh singer Mary Hopkin also recorded a version on her 1969 album, Postcard, produced by Paul McCartney and released on the Beatles' label, Apple Records.
