= Punta Sardegna Lighthouse =

Punta Sardegna
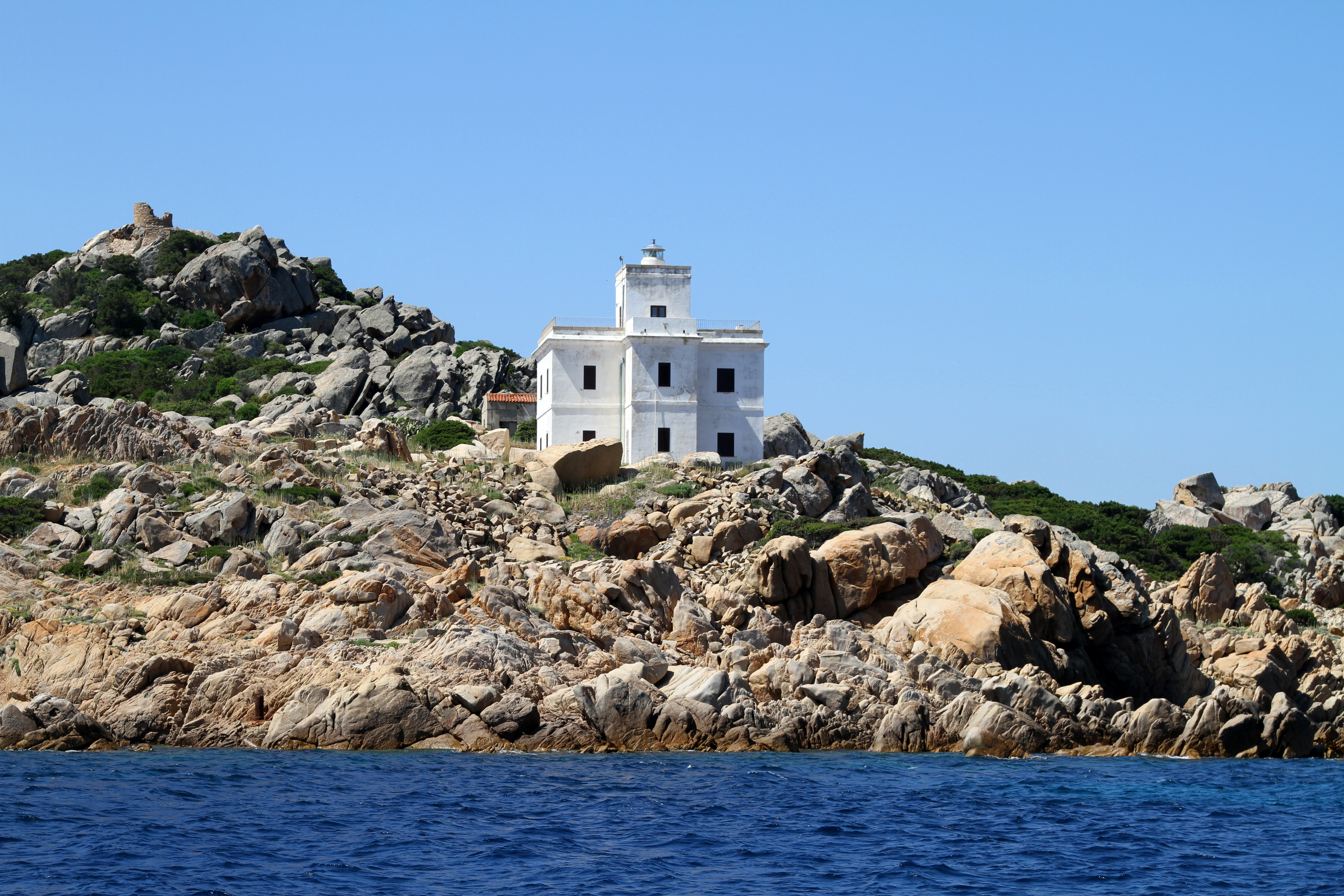
- Punta Sardegna Lighthouse
- Location: Palau; Sardinia; Italy
- Coordinates: 41°12′25″N 9°21′46″E

Tower
- Constructed: 1913
- Construction: granite tower
- Automated: 1975
- Height: 15 metres (49 ft)
- Shape: quadrangular tower with balcony and lantern atop a 2-storey keeper's house
- Markings: white keeper's house, tower, balcony and lantern, grey metallic lantern dome
- Power source: solar power
- Operator: Coastal and Marine Geomorphology Group and Marina Militare
- Fog signal: no

Light
- Focal height: 38 metres (125 ft)
- Lens: type TD 375; Focal length: 187.5 mm
- Intensity: MaxiHalo-60 EFF
- Range: 11 nautical miles (20 km; 13 mi)
- Characteristic: Fl W 5s.
- Italy no.: 1030 E.F.

Punta Sardegna Lighthouse (Italian: Faro di Punta Sardegna) is an active lighthouse located on the northern end of the granite promontory of Punta Sardegna, in front of the Maddalena archipelago, in the municipality of Palau on the Strait of Bonifacio.

== History ==
The lighthouse was built in 1913 and consists of a granite quadrangular tower, 15 metres (49 ft) high, with balcony and lantern atop a 2-storey keeper's house. The building and the tower are painted white, the lantern dome in grey metallic. The lighthouse was electrified in 1935 and automated in 1975 when the last keeper left; in the years 1946 and 1947 the work was carried out by a woman, Genoveffa Balzano. For twenty years the lighthouse remained in complete abandonment until 1995, when the structure was given, by the Marina Militare in free perpetual concession, to the Universities of Trieste and Cagliari as seat of the Coastal and Marine Geomorphology Group (OCEANS).

In 1998 an agreement was signed between the two Universities and the City of Palau and extended in 2008 to the Province of Olbia-Tempio. Renovation work was carried out by the municipality and the centre, which can accommodate up to 16 researchers, was opened on June 3, 2005.

== Description ==
The light is positioned at 38 metres (125 ft) above sea level and emits one white flash in a 5 seconds period visible up to a distance of 11 nautical miles (20 km; 13 mi). The light is completely automated, powered by a solar unit and managed by the Marina Militare with the identification code number 1030 E.F.; the building is managed by the Coastal and Marine Geomorphology Group.

== See also ==
- List of lighthouses in Italy
