= Ludmilla Tchérina =

French actress, ballerina and painter (1924–2004)

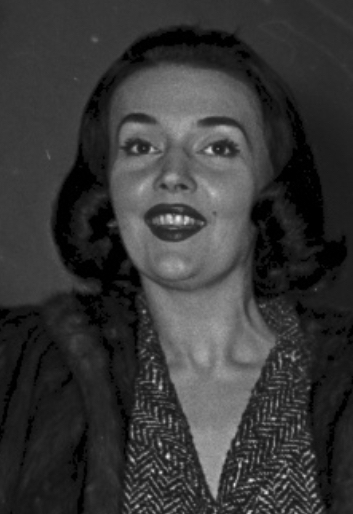
- Tchérina in 1955
- Born: Monique Tchemerzine; 10 October 1924; Paris, France
- Died: 21 March 2004 (aged 79); Paris, France
- Resting place: Montmartre Cemetery
- Occupations: Actress; Ballerina; Sculptor; Painter; Choreographer; Author
- Years active: 1946–1964
- Spouses: Edmond Audran (m. 1946; died 1951) Raymond Roi (m. 1953; died 1987)

Ludmilla Tchérina (born Monique Tchemerzine; 10 October 1924 – 21 March 2004) was a French prima ballerina and actress.

== Biography ==
She studied with Blanche d'Alessandri, Olga Preobrajenska and Clustine. She started dancing at 16 and danced with the Ballet Russe de Monte Carlo, where she was spotted by Serge Lifar. She made her Paris debut creating the rôle of Juliet in his Romeo and Juliet in 1942, becoming the youngest prima ballerina in the history of dance. In 1945 she was a principal dancer with the Ballet des Champs-Élysées and performed in Paris concerts with her husband Edmond Audran. She created various rôles in Lifar's ballets including: 'Mephisto Waltz' in 1945, A la memoire d'un heros in 1946 and in Le Martyre de Saint-Sebastian in 1957. She appeared often with the Paris Opera, the Bolshoi Ballet and the Kirov Ballet as a guest performer.

Tchérina acted in several films including The Red Shoes, Les Rendezvous, The Tales of Hoffmann, Oh... Rosalinda!! and Luna de Miel. She also appeared in television. In the 1980s she turned to writing and published two novels under her own name, L'Amour au Miroir (1973) and La Femme a L'Envers (1986).

Tchérina had a lifelong passion for painting and exhibited in many major galleries. She also conceived and executed several monumental sculptures, including Europe à Coeur, chosen in 1991 by the EU to symbolise the union of Europe and now located at the European Parliament. In 1994 she created Europa Operanda, now installed at the French terminal of Eurotunnel.

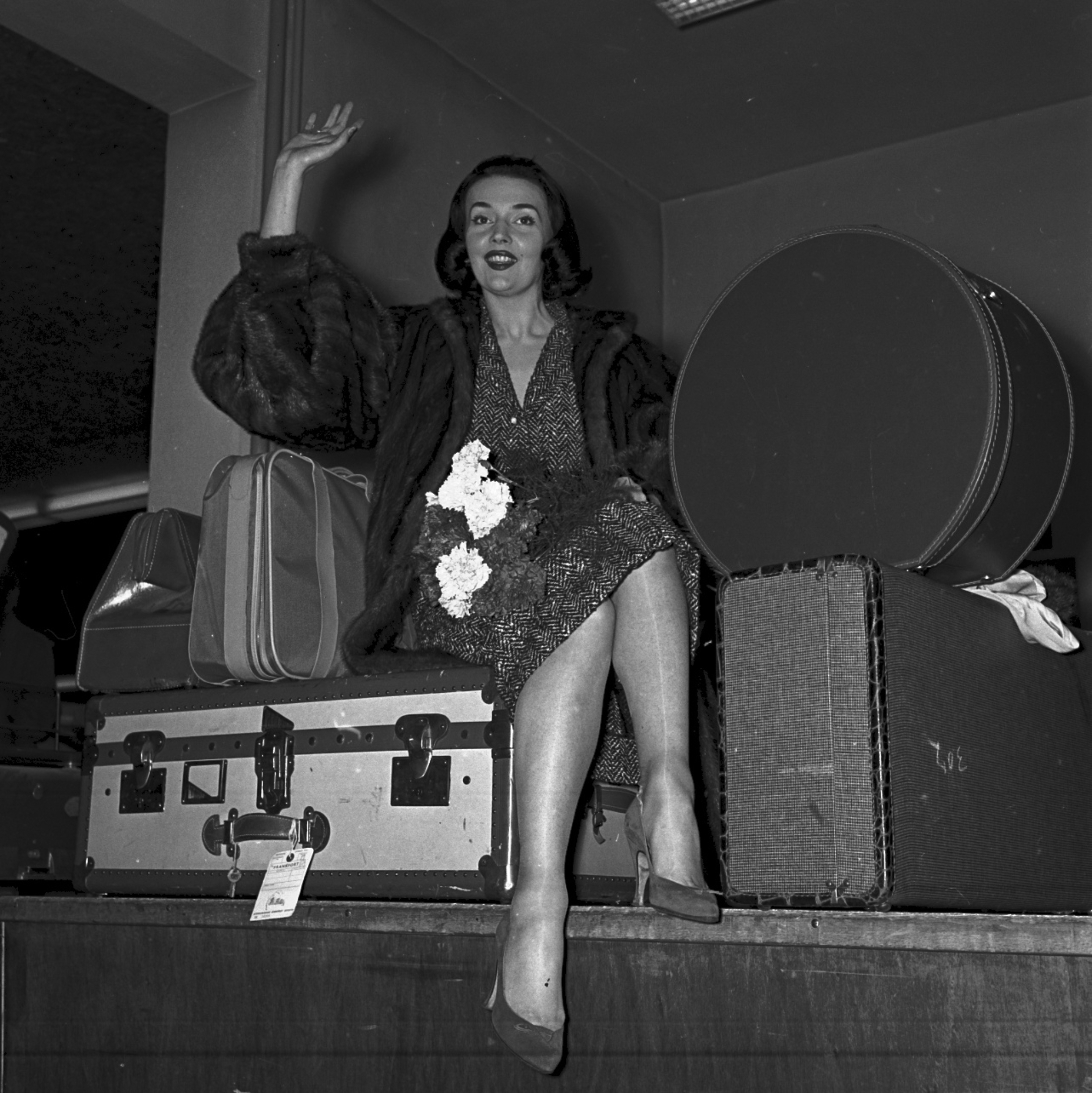
Ludmilla Tcherina 1955 at Frankfurt airport

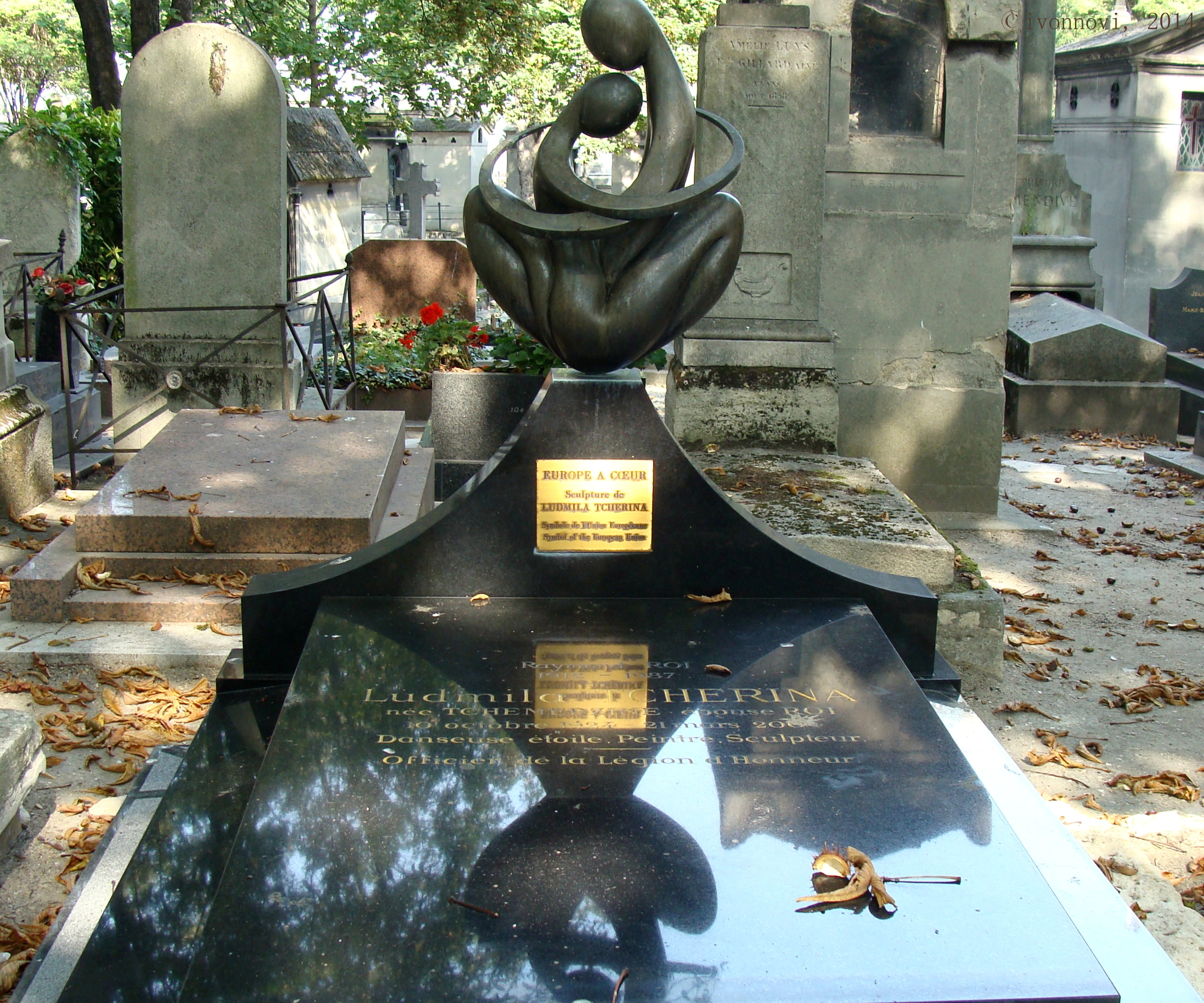
Grave of Tcherina at the Montmartre Cemetery

== Personal life ==
Edmond Audran, whom she married in 1946, died in a car accident in 1951. She married Raymond Roi in 1953. The marriage lasted until his death in 1987.

She was decorated with the Officier, Légion d'honneur in 1980.

== Death ==
Tchérina died in 2004, aged 79, and is buried at the Montmartre Cemetery, Paris.

== Filmography ==
Year	Title	Role	Notes
1946	Un revenant	Karina	
1948	The Red Shoes	Irina Boronskaja	
1949	Fandango	Angélica	
1950	Here Is the Beauty	Mireille Oslava	
1950	La nuit s'achève	Danielle Chevalier	
1951	The Tales of Hoffmann	Giulietta	
1951	Clara de Montargis	Clara	
1951	Parsifal	Kundry	
1952	Grand Gala	Monique	
1953	Sins of Rome	Amitys	
1954	Mata Hari's Daughter	Elyne	
1954	Sign of the Pagan	Princess Pulcheria	
1955	Oh... Rosalinda!!	Rosalinda	
1959	Honeymoon	Anna	
1962	The Lovers of Teruel	Isa	
1964	Une ravissante idiote		
1969	Salomé	Salomé	
