= Antonio (dancer) =

Spanish dancer and choreographer (1921–1996)

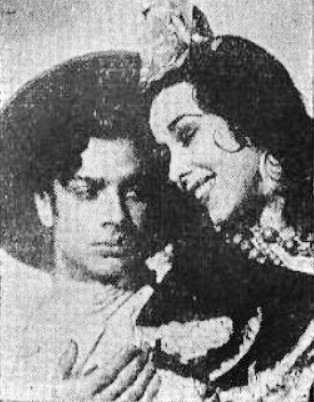
Antonio and Rosario, c. 1943

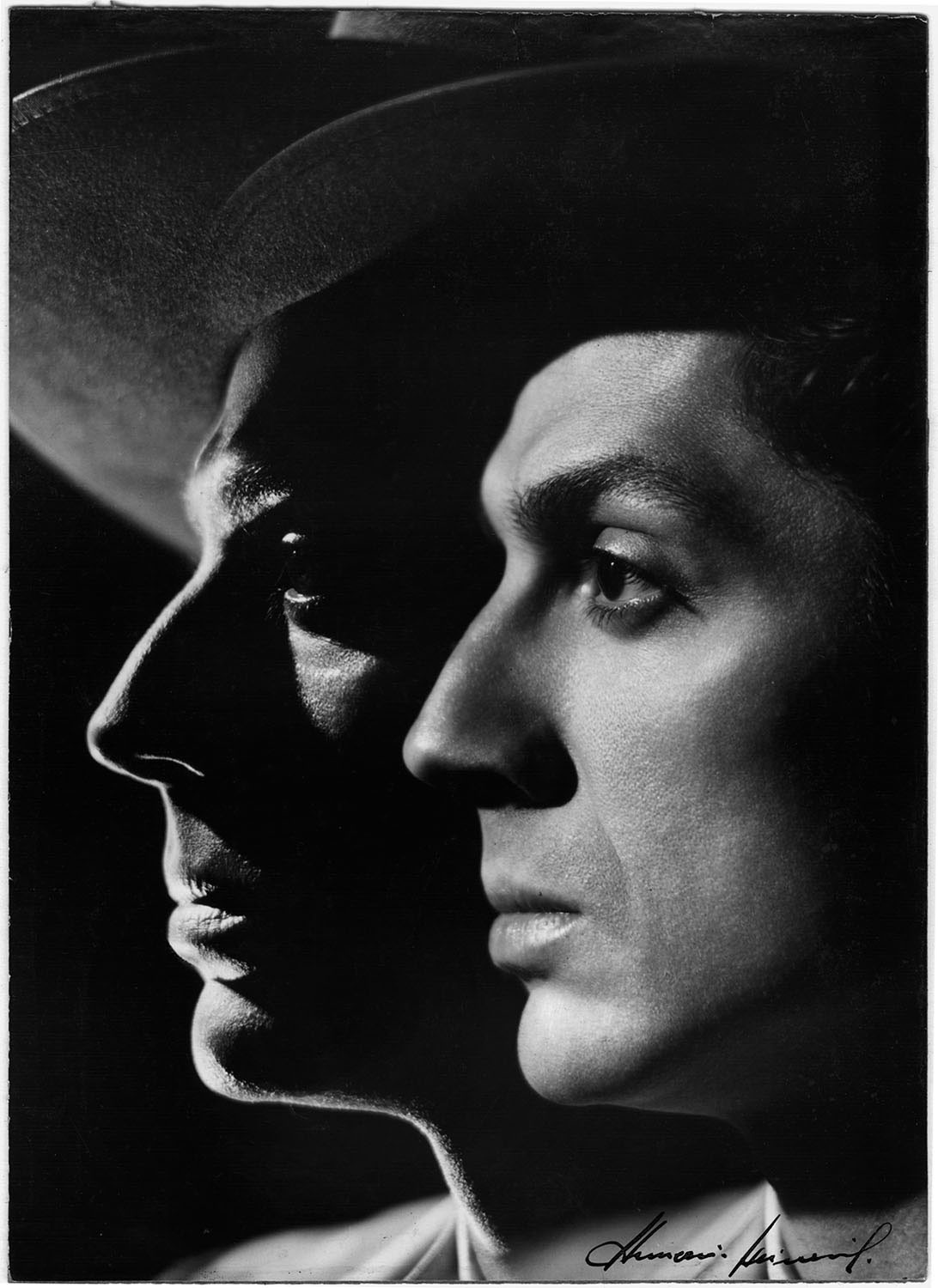
Antonio Luis Soler, by Annemarie Heinrich, 1954

Antonio Ruiz Soler (4 November 1921, Seville – 5 February 1996, Madrid), was a Spanish flamenco dancer, choreographer and dance director. He was professionally known as Antonio or Antonio el Bailarín ("Antonio the dancer"). With Rosario (Florence Pérez Padilla) he had a partnership which lasted from 1928 until 1952 and which became world-famous. They were billed as Rosario y Antonio.

During appearances in the United States he danced in Ravel's "Boléro" in New York City and appeared in several Hollywood movies, including "Ziegfeld Girl" (1941), "Hollywood Canteen" (1944) and in the Michael Powell- Film "Honeymoon" (1959), a UK/Spain- Production.

In 1953 he formed his own Spanish ballet company, Antonio y los Ballets de Madrid, and Rosario also formed a company, partnered by Iglesias. Antonio choreographed many works in Spanish and classical style; several were taken up by other companies.
