= Flamenco (1952 film) =

1952 film

- Directed by: Edgar Neville
- Written by: Edgar Neville; Walter Terry
- Produced by: Edgar Neville
- Cinematography: Heinrich Gärtner
- Edited by: Mercedes Alonso; Sara Ontañón
- Release date: 15 December 1952
- Running time: 75 minutes
- Country: Spain
- Language: Spanish

Flamenco (Spanish: Duende y misterio del flamenco) is a 1952 Spanish documentary film directed by Edgar Neville. It was entered into the 1953 Cannes Film Festival.

== Plot ==
Title changed to "Flamenco" when it was first released in the USA in 1954, this is a program of Spanish songs and dances with the emphasis on "flamenco" or gypsy contributions. The USA version has an English narrative written by Walter Terry, the dance critic of the New York Herald Tribune newspaper. Heading the cast are Antonio (I), Pilar Lopez and Maria Luz, three of Spain's foremost dancers of the time, accompanied by members of the Ballet Espanol.
