= Jacques Couëlle =

French architect (1902–1996)

Jacques Couëlle (1902–1996) was a French architect, whose work was marked by the movement known as architecture-sculpture.

== Biography ==
Couëlle was a self-taught architect. Uncategorised, he remains on the margins of major movements in architecture and in particular the Modernist movement. His architecture, with its sculptural forms of concrete designed and carved, evokes the movement of architecture-sculpture born after the war. Couelle was nicknamed "the architect of billionaires".

In 1946, Couëlle founded "the Research Centre of natural structures".

An eccentric character, he was a friend of Pablo Picasso and Salvador Dalí. He worked together with his son Savin Jacques Couëlle (1929–2020).

For his artistic merits, Couëlle was awarded the Legion of Honour at the French Academy.

== Achievements ==
- Bastide Saint-François (1925–1936) in the Alpes-Maritimes
- Villa Goupil in Chevreuse (78)
- Village Castellarras-le-Vieux (1955–1963) on the Côte d'Azur
- Hotel Cala di Volpe (1962) in Sardinia
- The House stones at Louveciennes (1994)
- Villa Super, Cannes
