= Palau, Sardinia =

Palau Su Parau (Sardinian) Lu Palau (Gallurese)
- Comune
- Comune di Palau
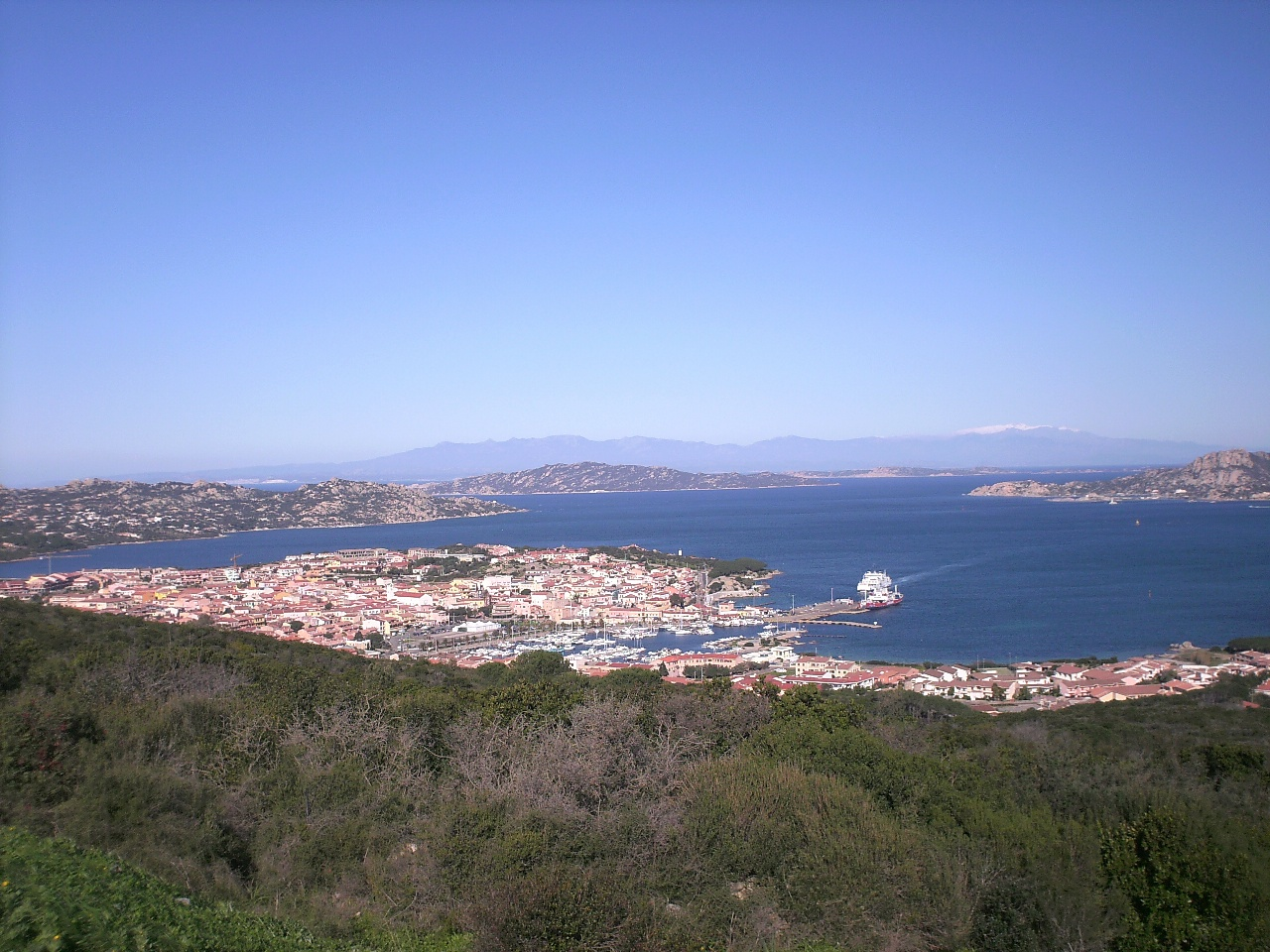
- View of Palau

- Location within Sardinia
- Coordinates: 41°11′N 9°23′E
- Country: Italy
- Region: Sardinia
- Province: Gallura North-East Sardinia
- Frazioni: Altura, Barrabisa, Capannaccia, Capo d'Orso, Costa Serena, L'Isuledda, Le Saline, Liscia Culumba, Petralana, Porto Pollo, Porto Rafael, Pulcheddu, Punta Sardegna

Government
  - Mayor: Francesco Pala

Area
  - Total: 44.44 km^{2} (17.16 sq mi)
- Elevation: 5 m (16 ft)

Population (2026)
  - Total: 4,058
  - Density: 91.31/km^{2} (236.5/sq mi)
- Demonym: Palaesi
- Time zone: UTC+1 (CET)
  - Summer (DST): UTC+2 (CEST)
- Postal code: 07020
- Dialing code: 0789
- Website: Official website

Palau (Sardinian: Su Parau, Gallurese: Lu Palau) is a town and comune (municipality) in the Province of Gallura North-East Sardinia, in the autonomous island region of Sardinia in Italy, about 220 kilometres (140 mi) north of Cagliari and about 30 kilometres (19 mi) northwest of Olbia. It has 4,058 inhabitants.

It is located on Punta Sardegna, and was founded in 1875 by local shepherds.

The Capo D'Orso or "Cape of the Bear" formation is nearby, at the very northwest tip of Sardinia. The unique formation is a result of honeycomb weathering, a form of salt weathering.

Palau was a frazione of the municipality of Tempio Pausania until 1959. It borders the municipalities of Arzachena, Santa Teresa Gallura, and Tempio Pausania.

== History ==
=== Prehistory and ancient history ===
In Palau there are remarkable archaeological sites such as the Giants’ Grave in Li Mizzani and Sajacciu, near the church of Saint Anthony of Gallura. The area of Li Mizzani is rich in prehistoric tombs, including a central stele 2.8 m high and 1.5 m wide. The area behind the stele and the exedra is made up of seven orthostatic plates, a long path covered in several lateral niches formed the tomb itself, and inside those niches vases were found that served as containers for food and water. The formation has a peculiar layout similar to a bull's head (worshipped at the time) followed by underground tombs where they buried remains (previously skinned and disjointed) of important people, such as wizards and shamans, to whom a "funerary ceremony of the dying" was devoted, designed to help the person lose consciousness of time. These rites lasted five days, during which wizards stayed close to the dying, absorbing the curative and purifying magnetic energies emanated by the tomb. As early as Aristotle and Simplicius, from Tertullian to Filipono we find mention of these ancient Sardinian rites in their scripts.

Nearby Li Mizzani, there is the Luchìa nuraghe (thought to be an ancient Roman trade town), of which we can still see the basis and the remains of the prehistoric village situated in a strategic area where the whole land and the Strait of Bonifacio can be seen. Its ruins were raided in the '40s, like the Li Mizzani site, by a group of grave robbers looking for treasures. The Sajacciu tombs are not as known because of their bad state of preservation. Of the whole burial area, only two big horns and the upper part of the stele, adorned with three grooves of ritual origin, are left. The area was raided in 1918 to extract construction material for a nearby farmyard.

According to the Odyssey, during his troubled journey back home, Ulysses bumped into the Lestrigons, who were said to be living in the area of Palau itself and in its surroundings.

=== Modern and contemporary history ===
The name refers to the Catalan-Aragonese conquest of the 14th century (palau is Catalan for "palace"). The first mention of "Palau" can be found in the first Piedmontese land survey papers; the first town nucleus dates back to the first half of the 19th century, when the shepherds of "tempiesi" (from Tempio Pausania including the famous "Zecchinu") that lived in the surrounding countryside moved to their seaside houses. They relocated temporarily to escape the torrid inner-land summer heat and gave life to the first families of the village, most of all to control their territories from a strategic point of view.

In 1793, there was a French attack during the war between the new Republic and the Kingdom of Sardinia. The very young lieutenant Bonaparte, who was trying to occupy the isle of La Maddalena, was rejected along with his fleet and forced to escape by the local sailors led by the Maddalenian Domenico Millelire, who had placed cannons on the Palau coast, and the Sardinian shepherds, who were stationed along the coast and struck the French ships light weaponry.

On the Isle of Saint Stephan, we can still find the house that young Bonaparte used as his base.

Gian Domenico Fresi-Zicchina built the first house in Palau in 1875. A major event was the bombing of the Italian Navy "Trieste" cruiser, which took place in the Mezzo Schifo ("Sciulara") bay as a consequence of an Anglo-American bombing. The bay was half destroyed on 10 April 1943, causing more or less 100 deaths. The cruiser sank in the 17-metre-deep sea, and its relics were then retrieved and sold to Spain.

Palau remained a village of Tempio Pausania until 1959, when the autonomous municipality was established.

== Monuments and places of interest ==
=== Monte Altura Fortress ===
Located just outside the village, it is an elevated military fortress that offers a panoramic view of the entire surrounding marine area. It was built in a period of two years in 1887–1889 and is now open to public.

=== Bear Rock ===
Very famous in antiquity, it was used by ancient navigators as a natural reference point. Situated in a short distance from the village, the Bear Rock is a 122-metre granite hill shaped by atmospheric agents, deemed particular for its bear shape and visited every year by thousands of people; the bear is depicted as the town's municipal emblem.

Ptolemy, in his cartography, called the site of the rock "Arcti Promontoria": this name is often translated as "bear promontories" (assuming that "arcti" is genitive of "arctŏs", name of the Ursa constellation), but it could also mean "narrow promontories" ("arctus" means "narrow").

=== Beaches ===
On the coast, from one end of the village to the other, the beaches alternate with stretches of granite coast. In correspondence with the village, in its main entrance coming from Olbia, there are respectively the following beaches: the Sciumara, immediately followed by the large rocky coast of "Acapulco", the beaches of Porto Faro, attached to the pine forest, and the beach of Palau Vecchio. Beyond the harbour, in the other half of the village, we can find the beach of the Isolotto, divided in half by another large pine forest. Starting from the Coluccia Peninsula, there is the huge Isuledda beach: a strip of sandy earth divided by the mouth of the River Liscia, situated about two kilometres after the peninsula of its namesake.

== Geography ==
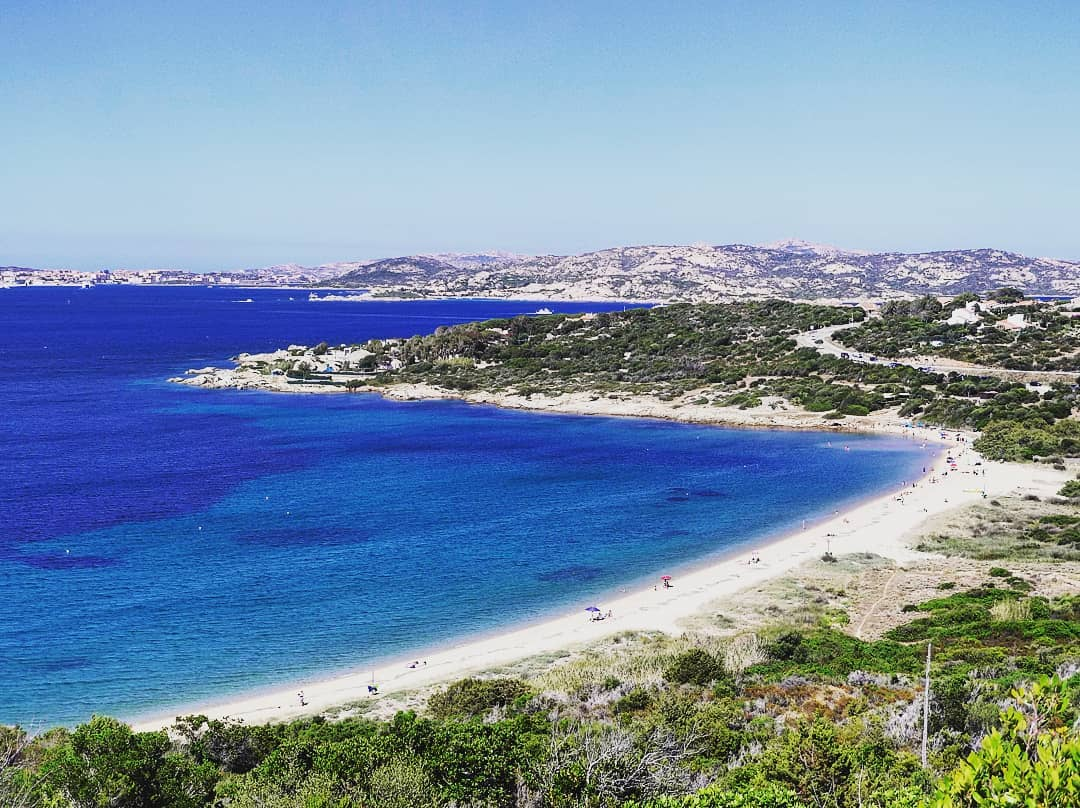
La Sciumara beach

Palau is located in the territorial region of Gallura in the northern cost of Sardinia, close to the Emerald Coast, and its harbour is the main channel of access to the La Maddalena archipelago.

The coastline is jagged and rocky, a large pine forest is located on the old town beach, and another one of equal size lies in the hills above the village. Every beach has thick and rich Mediterranean scrub, which includes olive trees, maritime pine, sea fennel, blueberries, rosemary, fennel, lavender, arbutus, lentisk, sea cistus, helichrysum and many others. Near Punta Sardegna there is Porto Rafael, a large area of Mediterranean maquis where there are a major yacht harbour and many villas owned by famous people.

=== Localities ===
Palau's villages and distances from the town centre are Altura (2.70 km), Barrabisa (8.21 km), Capannaccia (7.99 km), Capo d`Orso (2.95 km), Costa Serena (5.68 km), Le Saline (2.45 km), Liscia Culumba (3.03 km), Petralana (6.30 km), Porto Pollo (7.53 km), Pulcheddu (3.73 km) and Punta Sardegna (3.61 km).

== Demographics ==
Historical population
Year	Pop.	±%
1861	843	—
1871	859	+1.9%
1881	978	+13.9%
1901	1,203	+23.0%
1911	1,473	+22.4%
1921	1,382	−6.2%
1931	1,168	−15.5%
1936	1,332	+14.0%
1951	1,719	+29.1%
1961	1,750	+1.8%
1971	1,908	+9.0%
1981	2,369	+24.2%
1991	3,169	+33.8%
2001	3,468	+9.4%
2011	3,772	+8.8%
2021	4,106	+8.9%
Source: ISTAT

As of 2026, the population is 4,058, of which 50.7% are male, and 49.3% are female. Minors make up 13.2% of the population, and seniors make up 25.1%.

=== Languages and dialects ===
The dialect spoken in Palau is Gallurese.

=== Immigration ===
As of 2025, immigrants make up 14.3% of the total population. The 5 largest foreign countries of birth are Romania, Ukraine, France, the United States, and Albania.

== Culture ==
=== Events ===
The most famous religious celebration in town is the one devoted to Santa Maria delle Grazie, which is held in the first week of September. The sea procession is the final and most characteristic moment.

A renowned country festivity is that of St George (1 May). It is an important destination for devotees, where they celebrate with outdoor banquets in large tables and accordions in honour of the saint famous for his representation with a spear stuck in the body of a dragon during a fight on horseback.

We may also mention the Carnival of Palau, a destination for many tourists from all over Sardinia.

In the small peninsula of Isuledda, also known as Isola dei Gabbiani, international windsurfing and kite-surfing competitions take place every year. In Porto Rafael, the Punta Sardegna Yacht Club, together with the Emerald Coast Yacht Club, organizes the Formenton Trophy regatta.

== Economy ==
The tourism sector is the main resource, mainly during the summer season thanks to the clubs, hotels and the presence of a tourist harbour. The town has a library located in Palazzo Fresi, which overlooks the square of the same name.

== Transport ==
=== Railways ===
Palau is crossed by the terminal stretch of the Sassari-Tempio-Palau railway, active only as a tourist railway of the "Trenino Verde". The district has two stations: Palau and Palau Marina. The latter is the railway terminus and is located in the harbour area. In the stretch between the two stations, there is a driving rod exchange, necessary to overcome the steep slope.

== Gallery ==
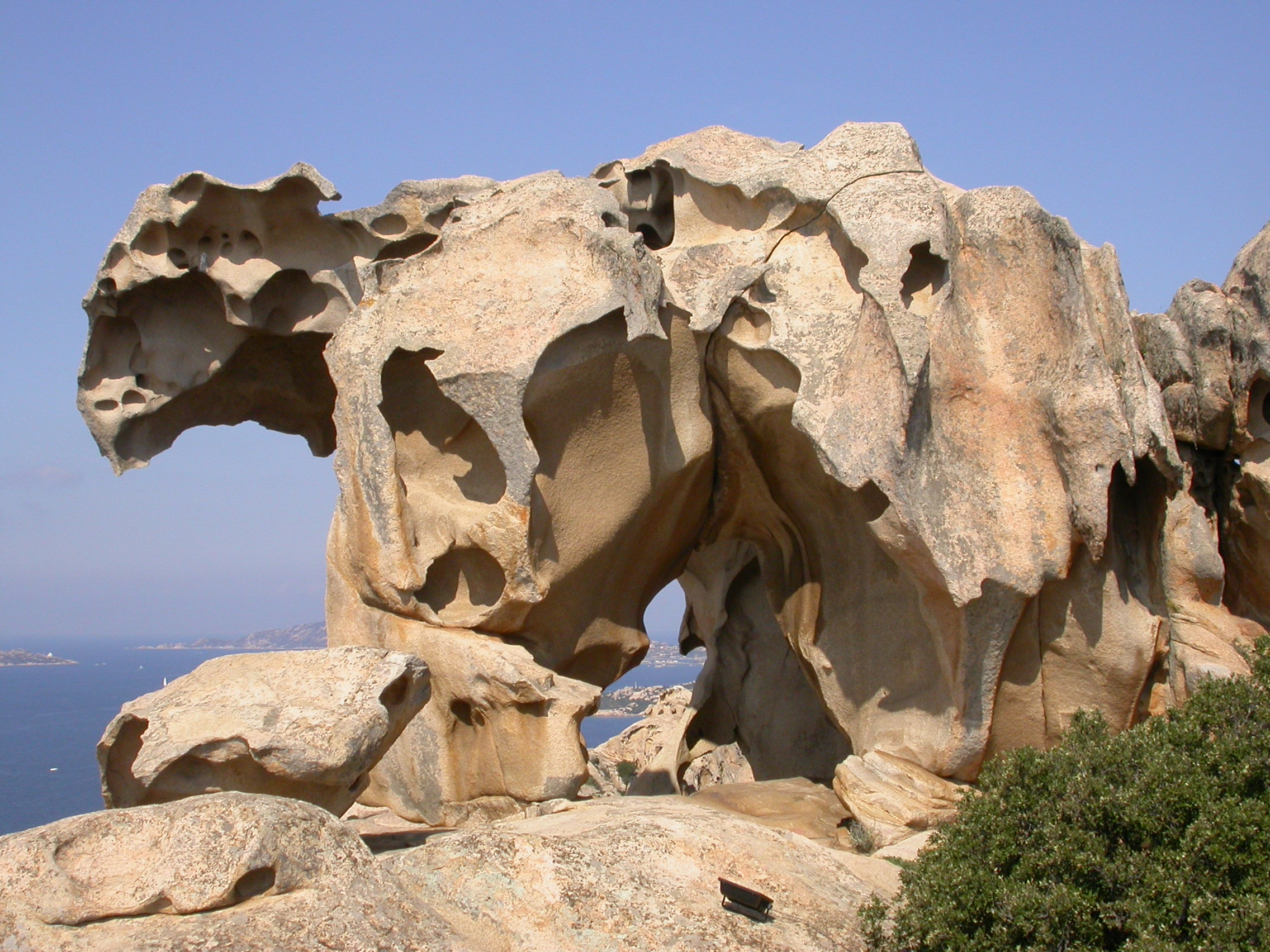
The Capo D'Orso formation.

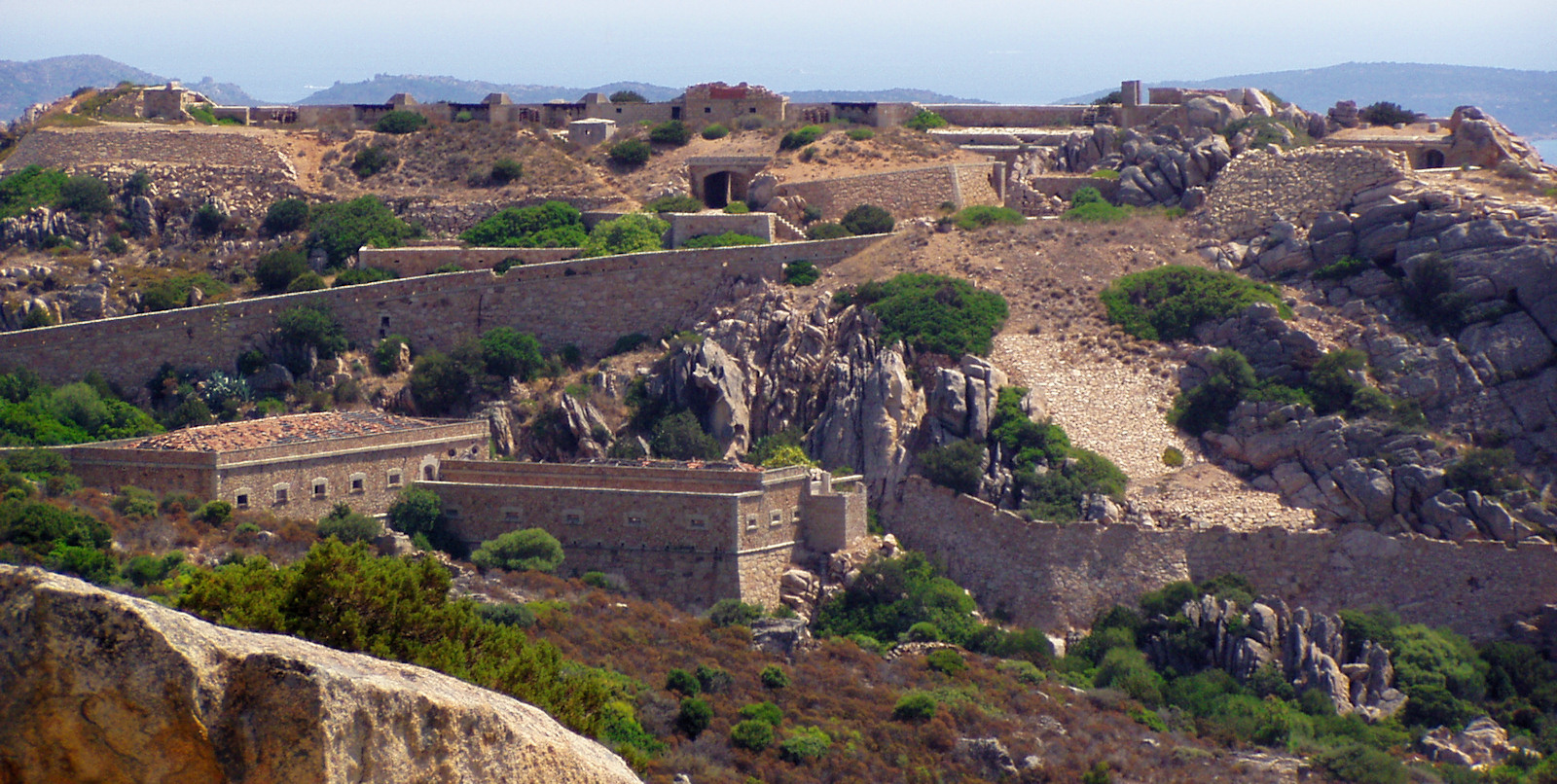
Monte Altura fortress, near Palau.

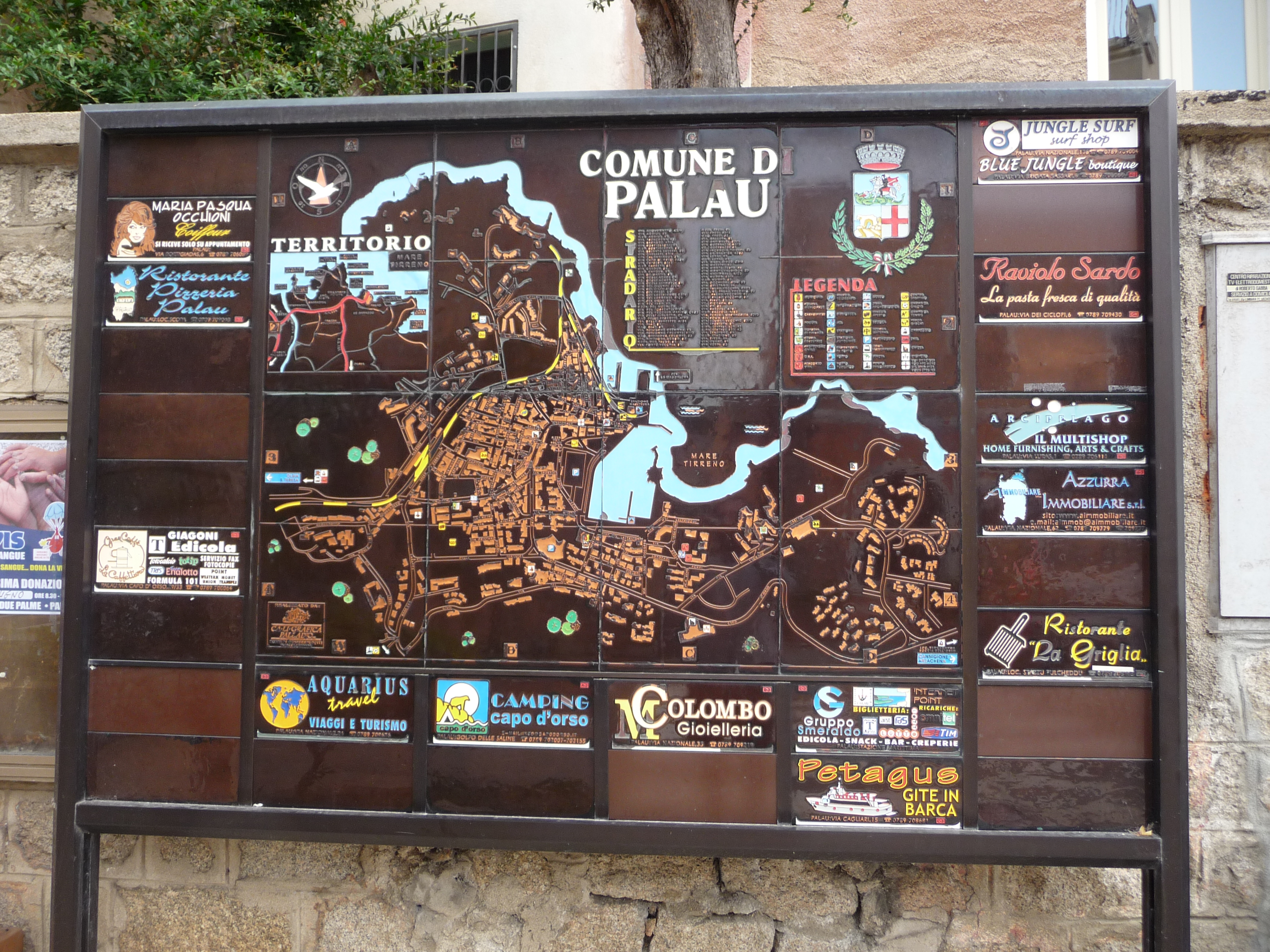
A tourist's map of Palau.

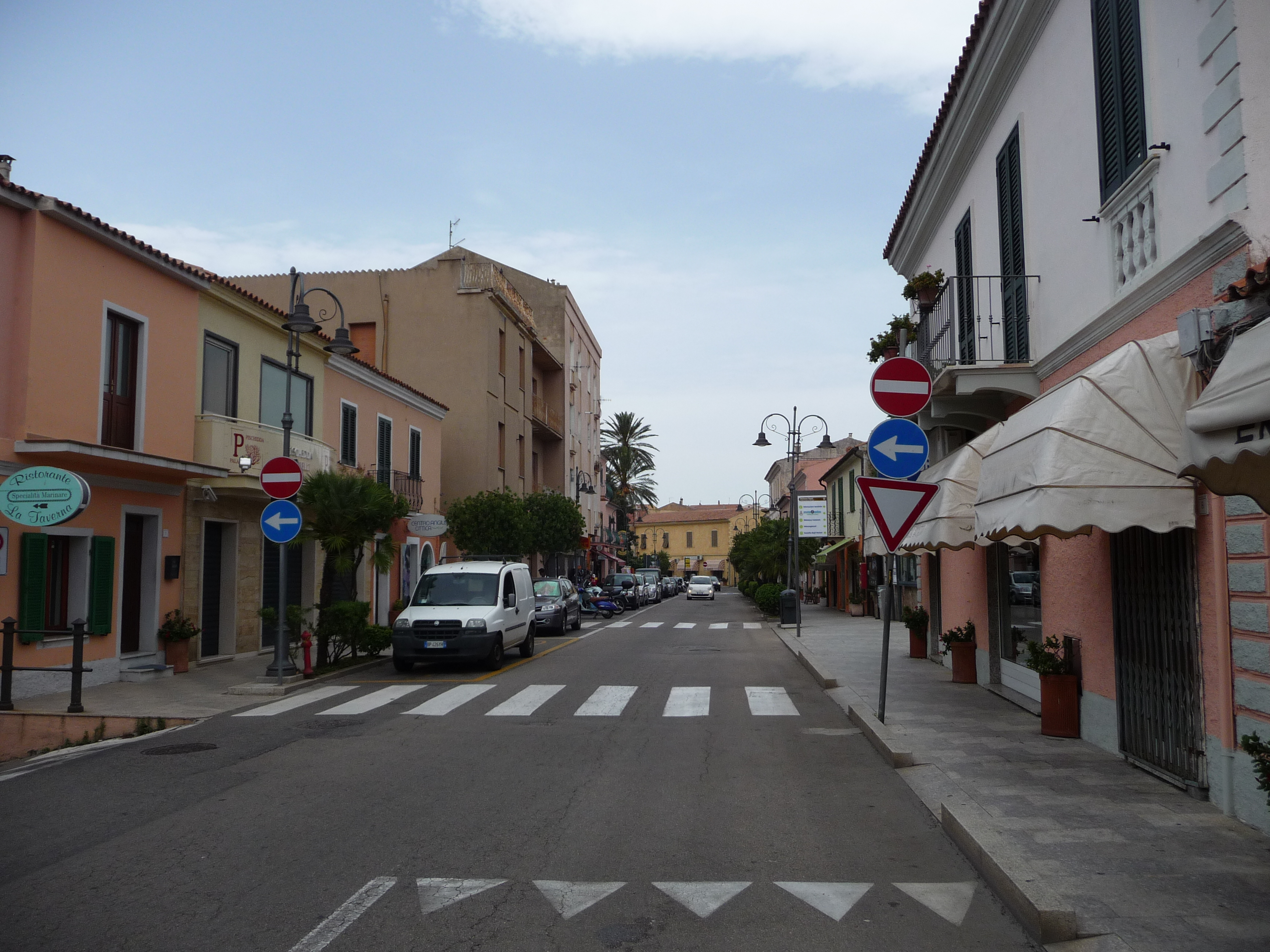
The streets of Palau.

== International relations ==
=== Twin towns - sister cities ===
- Saint-Genest-Lerpt, France, twinned with Palau since September 2005
