= Edgar Neville =

Spanish painter (1899–1967)

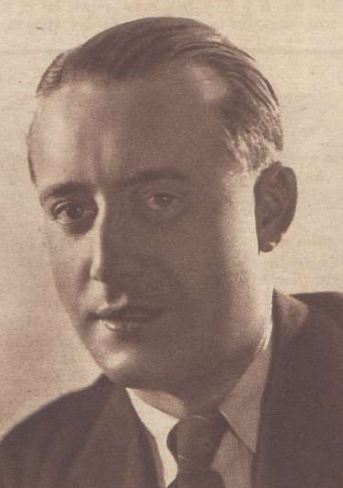
- Neville in 1936
- Born: 28 December 1899; Madrid, Spain
- Died: 23 April 1967 (aged 67); Madrid, Spain
- Occupations: Playwright, film director

Edgar Neville Romrée, Count of Berlanga de Duero (28 December 1899 – 23 April 1967) was a Spanish playwright and film director, a member of the Generation of '27.

== Biography ==
Neville was born in Madrid but lived in Hollywood in the 1930s, in the period of the dubbed Spanish versions of the studios' English-language films. He wrote dialogue for MGM's Spanish language films, and won acclaim for his script adapted from George Hill's The Big House (1930). During the Spanish Civil War, Neville made a few short propaganda films for the Nationalist side. He also made three movies in Rome. The films he directed in the 1940s and 1950s mixed realism and romanticism, but did not perform particularly well at the box-office. He was captain of the Spain men's national ice hockey team at the 1924 Ice Hockey European Championship and also played at the 1926 Ice Hockey European Championship.

== Family ==
=== Parents ===
His father was Edward Neville Riddlesdale, an English engineer who was director of his family's engine company in Spain (Julius G. Neville & Co, Liverpool, later the Anglo-Spanish Motor Company). His mother was Mary Romrée y Palacios, daughter of Count and Countess de Berlanga de Duero, a title he would later inherit.

=== Marriage ===
Edgar Neville married Ángeles Rubio Argüelles y Alessandri. Their son, Raphael Neville, Count of Berlanga de Duero (11 August 1926 – December 1996) was a painter who, in 1958, created a seaside resort in Sardinia, called "Porto Rafael". Upon his return to Spain, Neville directed La señorita de Trevélez, and it was hailed one of the best films of its time. Raphael was also involved in establishing Puerto de Mogan as a tourist destination.

== Filmography ==
- El presidio (The Jail, 1930)
- Take Me to Hollywood (1931)
- Do, Re, Mi, Fa, Sol, La, Si, o La vida privada de un tenor (1934)
- The Wicked Carabel (1935)
- The Lady from Trévelez (1936)
- Juventudes de España (1938)
- Bound for Cairo (1935)
- La ciudad universitaria (1938)
- Vivan los hombres libres (1939)
- Carmen fra i rossi/Frente de Madrid (1939)
- Santa Rogelia (1939)
- Madrid Carnival (1941)
- Sancta Maria (1942)
- La parrala (1942)
- Correo de Indias (1942)
- Café de París (1943)
- The Tower of the Seven Hunchbacks (1944)
- Carnival Sunday (1945)
- Life on a Thread (1945)
- The Crime of Bordadores Street (1946)
- The Bullfighter's Suit (1947)
- Nada (1947)
- El marqués de Salamanca (1948)
- El señor Esteve (1948)
- The Last Horse (1950)
- Cuento de hadas (1951)
- Devil's Roundup (1952)
- Flamenco (1952)
- La ironía del dinero (1955)
- The Dance (1959)
- My Street (1960)

== Novels, plays and other writings ==
- Don Clorato de Potasa (1929)
- Margarita y los hombres (1934)
- El baile (1952)
- La niña de la calle del Arenal (prologue by actor Jesús García de Dueñas, 1953)
- Torito bravo (novella, 1955)
- Mi España particular (travel book, 1957)
- La piedrecita (play in three acts, 1957)
- Alta fidelidad (comic play in two acts, 1960)
- Flamenco y cante jondo (1963)
- Las terceras de ABC (ABC articles compendium, published posthumously by Editorial Prensa Española in 1976)

== Bibliography ==
- Nadal, María Luisa Burguera (1994). Edgar Neville : Entre el Humurismo y la Poesía. Málaga: Servicio de Publicaciones, Diputación Provincial de Málaga. ISBN 978-8477851103.
- Nadal, Maria Luisa Burguera (1999). Edgar Neville : Entre el Humor y la Nostalgia. València: Institució Alfons El Magnànim, Diputació De València: Universitat Jaume I. ISBN 978-8478222841.
- Benzal, Félix Monguilot (2007). "Volver al frente: reconstrucción de la película "Frente de Madrid" (1939) de Edgar Neville". In Carratalá, Juan A. Ríos (ed.). Universo Neville. Málaga: Instituto Municipal del Libro. pp. 145–166. ISBN 978-84-96055-82-7. OCLC 1187053642.
- Perucha, Julio Pérez (1982). El Cinema de Edgar Neville. Valladolid: 27 Semana Internacional de Cine de Valladolid. LCCN 85154554. OCLC 1123760597.
