= José Muñoz Molleda =

Spanish composer

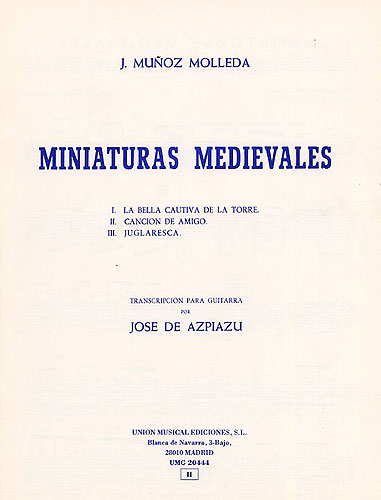

José Muñoz Molleda (1903–1988) was a Spanish composer, journalist, jurist and politician. He was one of the "músicos del '27."

He was born in La Línea de la Concepción in 1903, where he first studied music under Luis Criado. He later studied in Madrid in the Real Conservatorio, where he received prizes in piano, harmony and composition. He also visited Rome where he received lessons from Respighi. While preparing for a career in music, Muñoz Molleda also studied in the Escuela Superior de Bellas Artes between 1922 and 1926. Eventually, however, he elected to devote himself to music and abandoned the idea of being a painter.

In 1932, his tone poem "En la tierra alta" was awarded first prize in a national competition, and the following year he was awarded the "Gran Premio di Roma", where he went to study in 1934. It was in Rome that his first string quartet was awarded a prize by the Regia Academia di Santa Cecilia. This success was followed in 1936 by his success of his oratorio La Resurrección de Lázaro.

In 1951 he was again awarded a national prize, this one for his trio for flute, cello and piano, and eight years later this was followed by a Ciudad de Barcelona prize for his symphony in A major.

He was an active composer of film music, according to Riquelme Sanchez, writing 37 film scores in the course of his career. In a recent paper, Sowa has argued that his score for the film Solange du Lebst, set during the Spanish civil war, is an exercise in fascist national identity formation, 'an ideologically coded soundscape of Spain that echoes the National-Catholic ideals of the Franco regime, blurring the boundaries between emotion, faith, and political conviction'.

== Works, editions and recordings ==
- José Muñoz Molleda. Obras para orquesta - Circo. Variaciones sobre un tema. Introducción y fuga. Sinfonía en la menor.
- Muñoz Molleda: Farruca Narciso Yepes (guitar)

== Selected filmography ==
- Goyescas (1942)
- The House of Rain (1943)
- The Bullfighter's Suit (1947)
- A Toast for Manolete (1948)
- Two Paths (1954)
- High Fashion (1954)
- As Long as You Live (Solange de Lebst) (1955)
