= A Lucky Man =

1930 film

- Theatrical film poster
- Spanish: Un hombre de suerte
- Directed by: Benito Perojo
- Written by: Gustave Quinson (play); Yves Mirande (play); Pedro Muñoz Seca; René Barberis
- Produced by: Robert Kane
- Starring: Roberto Rey; María Luz Callejo; Valentín Parera
- Cinematography: Harry Stradling Sr.
- Music by: José Sentis
- Production company: Paramount Pictures
- Distributed by: Paramount Pictures
- Release date: September 13, 1930
- Running time: 96 minutes
- Country: United States
- Language: Spanish

A Lucky Man (Spanish: Un hombre de suerte) is a 1930 American comedy film directed by Benito Perojo and starring Roberto Rey, María Luz Callejo and Valentín Parera. It is a Spanish-language film made for the Hollywood company Paramount Pictures at their Joinville Studios in Paris. Separate versions were also made in French and Swedish. The French version is known as A Hole in the Wall.

It is now considered a lost film.

== Cast ==
- Roberto Rey as Luciano Barbosa / Lucas Gómez
- María Luz Callejo as Urbana
- Valentín Parera as Castrenese
- Rosario Pino as Doña Bermuda
- Carlos San Martín as Don Digno Lesaca
- Joaquín Carrasco as El jardinero
- Amelia Muñoz as Isidra
- Helena D'Algy as Salomé
- Rosita Díaz Gimeno
- Roberto Iglesias

== Reception ==
The Diario Democracia called the film a "laugh-out loud" comedy and praised the cinematography and Pino's performance. Critica praised the direction and the performances.
