= Blanca Pozas =

Chilean actress and vedette

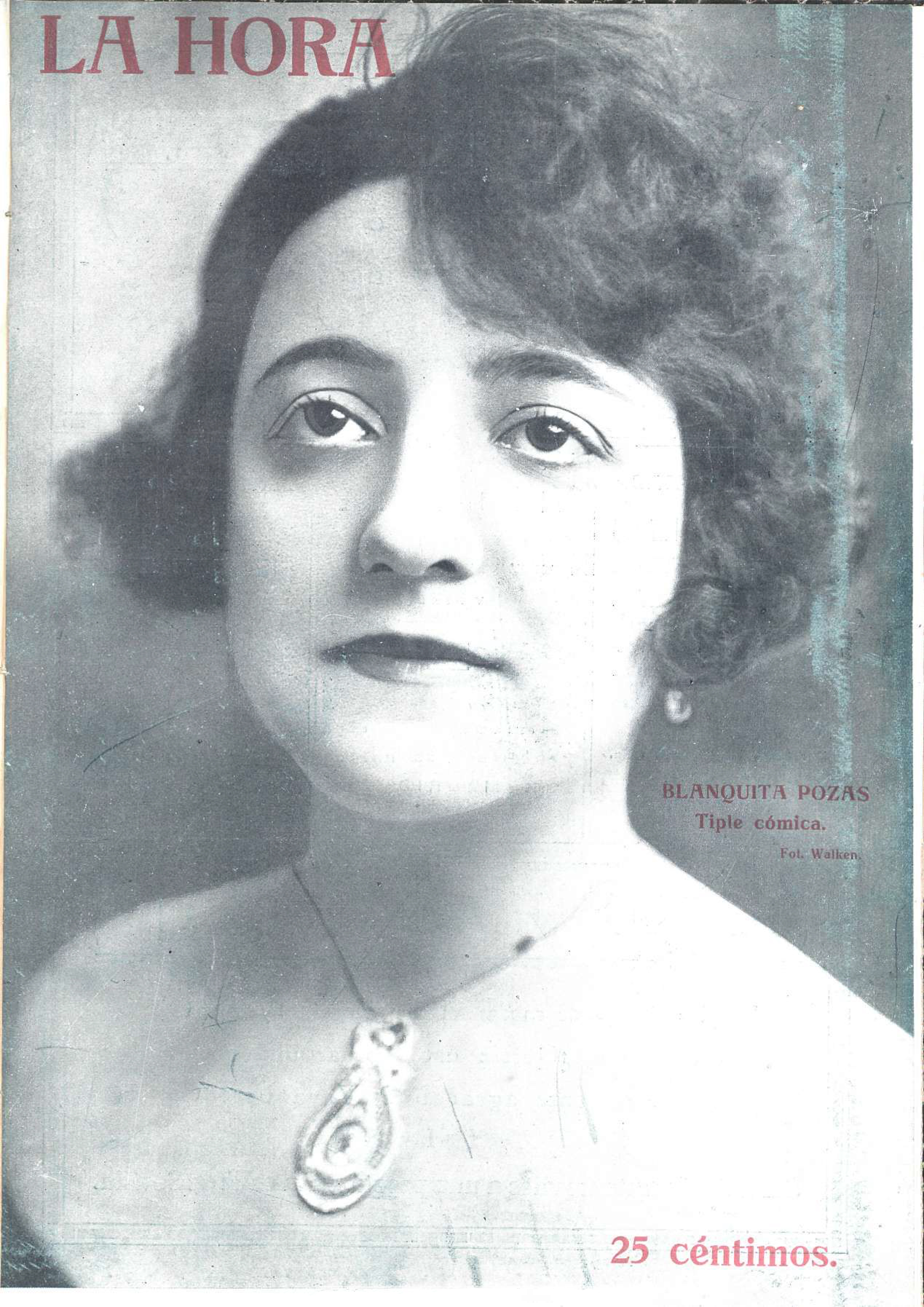
- Born: 1893; Valparaíso, Chile
- Died: 29 August 1978 (aged 84–85); Madrid, Spain
- Burial place: Cementerio de la Almudena
- Occupations: Vedette and actress
- Spouse: Miguel Ligero
- Children: Luis Ligero Pozas; Blanca Ligero Pozas

Blanca Pozas Oliveira (sometimes accredited as Blanquita Pozas) (1893 - 29 August 1978) was a Chilean vedette and actress who participated in nine movies during her cinematographic career which lasted from 1926 to 1953.

== Biography ==
Born in Valparaíso, she soon triumphed in Spain as a vedette at the Teatro Martín. Until the outbreak of the Civil War, she premiered the most popular shows of the billboard, among which stand out: Frivolina (1918), Las corsarias (1919), Ris, Ras (1927), Los faroles (1928), Los caracoles (1928), La casa de Quirós (1931), La camisa de la Pompadour (1934) and Las Peponas (1934). She worked with the most popular comedians of her time: Lino Rodríguez, Castrito, Ramón Peña, Faustino Bretaño, etc.

Unlike her husband Miguel Ligero, she worked little in the cinema, appearing in a total of nine films, among which Marianela (1940), Viaje sin destino (1942) and El rey de las finanzas (1944) stand out.

== Filmography ==
- Frivolinas (1926)
- Crisis mundial (1934)
- Nobleza baturra (1935)
- La vida bohemia (1938)
- Los hijos de la noche (1939)
- Marianela (1940)
- Viaje sin destino (1942)
- El rey de las finanzas (1944)
- Sobresaliente (1953)
