= La vida de Rita =

Spanish comedy television series

- Genre: Comedy
- Screenplay by: Manuel Iborra
- Directed by: Manuel Iborra
- Starring: Verónica Forqué; Juan Echanove; Pepón Nieto; María Vázquez; Macarena Gómez
- Country of origin: Spain
- Original language: Spanish
- No. of seasons: 1
- No. of episodes: 13

Production
- Running time: 70 min (approx.)
- Production company: Tesauro

Original release
- Network: La 1 La 2
- Release: 7 January 2003 – 2003

La vida de Rita is a Spanish comedy television series. Written and directed by Manuel Iborra, it stars Verónica Forqué, Juan Echanove and Pepón Nieto. It aired on Televisión Española (La 1 and La 2) in 2003.

== Premise ==
Rita (Verónica Forqué), Samuel (Juan Echanove) and Cucho (Pepón Nieto) own a bar where the rest of the characters hang out.

== Cast ==
Main

- Verónica Forqué as Rita, a separated woman with two daughters, co-owner of a bar-restaurant-billiard club.
- Juan Echanove as Samuel, Rita's business associate, infatuated by Rita, a mediocre cook.
- Pepón Nieto as Cucho, Rita's business associate, Samuel's brother, unbearable and chronically aggressive.
- María Vázquez as Berta, Rita's biological daughter.
- Macarena Gómez as Leonor, Rita's adopted daughter.
- Agustín González as Fernando, Samuel and Cucho's father.
- Sandra Blázquez as Rosarito, Cucho's daughter.

Guest

- Antonio Resines.
- Pilar Bardem.

== Production and release ==
Written and directed by Manuel Iborra, the series meant the return of Verónica Forqué to Televisión Española (TVE) after Pepa y Pepe, also directed by Iborra. The series was produced by Tesauro. It consisted of 13 episodes with a running time of roughly 70 minutes.

The series premiered on 7 January 2003 in prime time, earning good viewership figures (4,183,000 viewers and a 23.7% share). However, the interest of the viewers rapidly waned and TVE cancelled the series after the 5th episode, aired on 4 February 2003. 8 episodes were left unaired in the original run.

About two hundred of TVE Catalunya workers denounced the replacement of the series for a documentary about bioterrorism as an alleged part of government propaganda efforts in favour of the Iraq War, voicing their "rejection of the policy of intoxication and manipulation of information that RTVE is carrying out with regard to the Iraq conflict".

The full series aired in the northern hemisphere summer of 2003 on La 2. As of 2021, the series was not available in the RTVE's online catalogue.
