= Estrellita Castro =

Spanish singer and actress (1908–1983)

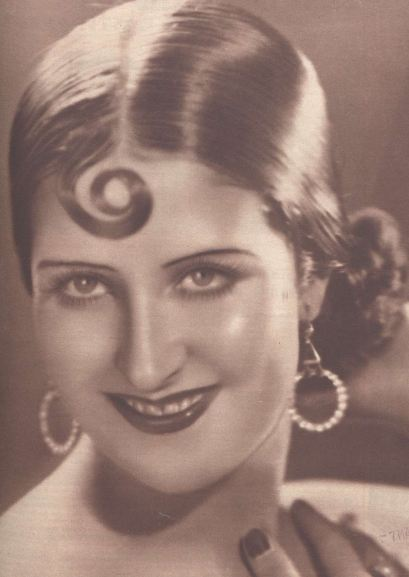
- Photographed in 1936

Background information
- Also known as: «La Reina del Pasodoble» «La Castro»
- Born: Estrella Castro Navarrete; 26 June 1908; Seville, Spain
- Origin: Seville, Spain
- Died: 10 July 1983 (aged 75) Madrid, Spain
- Genres: Copla, Pasodoble, Flamenco, Bolero, Tango
- Occupations: Singer, actress
- Instrument: Vocals
- Years active: 1920–1983
- Partner: Demetrio Corbí Pujante

Estrella Castro Navarrete known professionally as Estrellita Castro (26 June 1908 in Seville – 10 July 1983 in Madrid) was a Spanish singer and actress.

== Early career ==
Born to a humble family (her father, born in 1875, was a Galician fisherman; and her mother, died in 1953, was Sebastiana Navarrete Funes) she started singing from an early age and busked around in Sevilla streets. At the age of 11 she attended Realito Music School to learn singing techniques and did Realito's house chores as a way to pay for her lessons. At the age of 12 she performed for the first time for King Alfonso XIII and Queen Victoria Eugenia at Sevilla Royal Alcázares. Ignacio Sánchez Mejías, a famous Spanish bullfighter, realized Estrellita's vocal and dancing qualities at a charity festival and gave her a gold coin. Estrellita Castro made her debut at Tronío Theatre in Sierpes Street in Seville but she was bound to perform in the main theatres in Spain, Europe, Latin-America and even the United States.

== Film career ==
Her success in Spain attracted the attention of many businessmen and managers who contracted Estrellita. This enabled her to launch her career on an international level as she was successful in the main European cities and some Latin-American countries, where she became a popular idol. Her success as a singer paved her way to the film industry, and she became one of the most popular and highly-paid Spanish actresses of the time. Although she starred in a clip in 1933, she really made her debut in 1935 in Rosario la Cortijera. She starred in 40 movies the most important of which were filmed in Germany- Suspiros de España, The Barber of Seville and Mariquilla Terremoto. The charm of her movements in the cinema together with her powerful acute voice and beauty conquered the public. One of the iconic features of her personal looks was a hair-curl on her forehead.

== Legacy ==
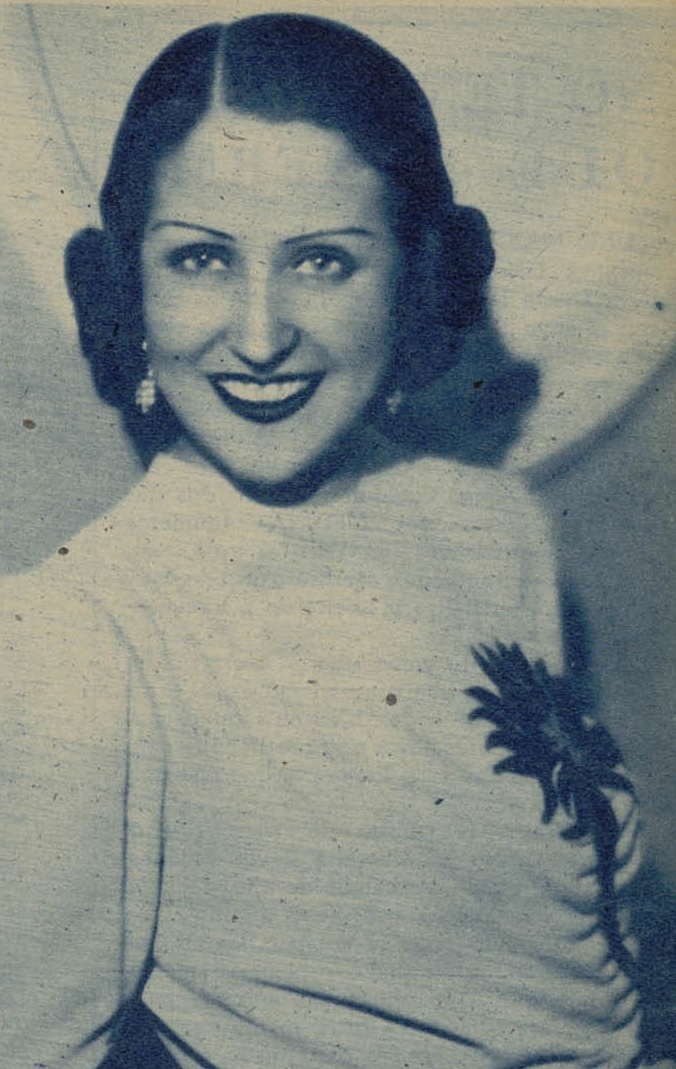
Estrellita Castro in 1941, during the peak of her career as a singer and actress. Known as one of the most iconic voices of the Spanish copla and Andalusian song, she played a key role in shaping 20th-century Spanish popular music.

Estrellita Castro had her heyday in the 1930s and 1940s and she is considered to be the creator of what is known as Andalusian song or copla, a typical Spanish musical genre. Since she grew up in Seville Flamenco Cafés she was quite knowledgeable about flamenco different styles. She added flamenco resources to French couplets and created a new folk fusion-style known as copla. Mi jaca, Suspiros de España, La Morena de mi copla, Los Tientos del Reloj, María de la O, Mari Cruz o María Magdalena are some Estrellita's greatest hits. Although she mainly cultivated music of a folk nature, she is hailed as the most prolific and versatile artist of her time. She cultivated many musical styles such as zambras, Cuban boleros and mazurkas. She was also introduced to tangos by the famous Argentinian singer Carlos Gardel. It is also remarkable her value as a flamenco singer, as the styles she cultivates range from serranas, soleares and saetas to guajiras, sevillanas and tanguillos.

== Tributes ==
In the 1960s and 1970s she received many tributes and honors because she was a living myth for the Spanish music and cinema. In 1962 she was awarded with the "Medalla al Mérito en el Trabajo" (The Gold Medal for Merit at Work)- symbol of a lifetime devoted to music and work. In 1978 the City Council of Seville agreed to name a street after Estrellita Castro since she contributed to the popularity of her city all over the world. She also got a street named after her in Cordoba and Madrid. She died in 1983, before she arrived to an agreement with Tico Medina to publish her biography. Her dead body remained exhibited at Teatro Lara, where she had been so successful in her heyday. She was buried in Madrid in the Almudena Graveyard, with a hair curl on her forehead and a Spanish mantilla.

== Filmography ==
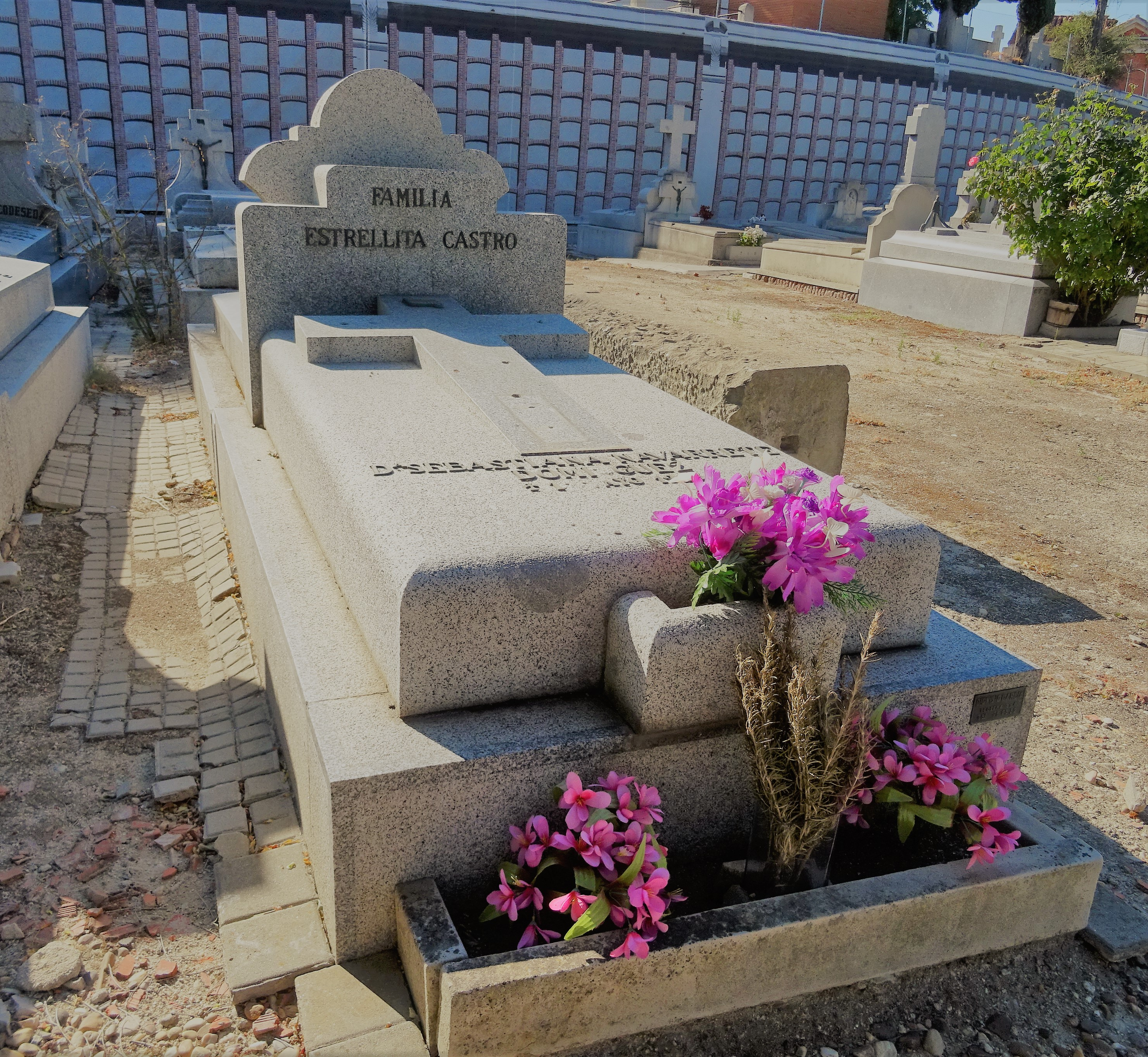
Family tomb of singer and actress Estrellita Castro in the Almudena Cemetery of Madrid. A prominent figure of Spanish copla and Andalusian music, Castro is buried here alongside her relatives in one of Madrid's most historic cemeteries.

Year	Title	Role	Notes
1933	Mi patio andaluz	—	Short film
1935	Rosario la Cortijera	—	—
1938	The Barber of Seville	—	—
1938	Mariquilla Terremoto	—	—
1939	Sighs of Spain	—	—
1939	Los hijos de la noche	—	—
1940	La gitanilla	—	—
1941	Whirlwind	—	—
1942	Los misterios de Tánger	—	—
1943	La maja del capote	—	—
1943	La patria chica	—	—
1953	You Had to Be a Gypsy	Aunt Paca	a musical comedy film
1967	La niña del patio	—	—
1971	La casa de los Martínez	—	—
1973	Casa Flora	—	—

== Clips ==
- Estrellita Castro performs "Lola, la de los Brillantes" on YouTube
- Estrellita Castro performs "Suspiros de España" (clip de video)
