= Raquel Rodrigo =

Cuban actress and singer (1915–2004)

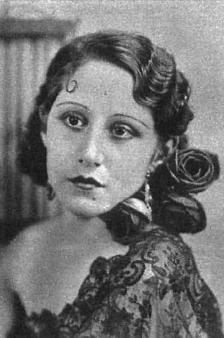
- Born: Raquel Rodríguez López; 11 March 1915; Havana, Cuba
- Died: 18 March 2004 (aged 89); Madrid, Spain
- Other name: Raquel Rodrigo López
- Occupations: Actress, Singer
- Years active: 1932–1997 (film)
- Parent: Abdón Rodríguez Santos

Raquel Rodríguez López known as Raquel Rodrigo (1915–2004) was a Cuban actress and singer who appeared in Spanish films. In 1935, she appeared in the music film Paloma Fair.

== Early life ==
Rodrigo was born to Spanish parents Abdón Rodríguez Santos and Marina López Rosabal from Galicia. The family later returned to Spain in 1921 and after completing his secondary studies he began studying medicine. However, he abandoned his career to dedicate himself fully to the theatre.

Considered a popular leading actress in the period of the Second Spanish Republic, she debuted in cinema in 1932 with Carceleras, by José Buchs, the first film spoken in Spain, which premiered at the Opera de Madrid cinema on October 10, 1932. The enormous popularity at the time was largely due to the character of Susana that she played in the film La verbena de la Paloma (1935), by Benito Perojo, along with Miguel Ligero Rodríguez. The El barbero de Sevilla (1936), also by Perojo, was shot at the UFA Studios in Berlin.

== Filmography ==
Year	Title	Role	Notes
1932	Carceleras		
1933	Una morena y una rubia		
1934	Odio		
1934	Doña Francisquita		
1934	Una semana de felicidad		
1935	Paloma Fair	Susana	
1937	Madre Alegría	Mariquita	
1937	The Moorish Queen	Mercedes	
1938	The Barber of Seville	Rosina	
1940	El rey que rabió	Rosa	
1941	Para ti es el mundo		
1947	The Captain's Ship	Doña Leonor	
1948	Extraño amanecer		
1951	Malibran's Song		
1973	No es bueno que el hombre esté solo	woman at the club	
1975	No quiero perder la honra		
1975	Zorrita Martinez	Monja	
1975	El poder del deseo	Vecina	
1975	El mejor regalo		
1976	Morir... dormir... tal vez soñar	Herminia	
1976	La lozana andaluza		
1977	El hombre que supo amar	Señora Asustada	
1977	Cazar un gato negro	Internada 1ª	
1977	Obsesión	Madre de Angelines	
1977	Viva/muera Don Juan Tenorio		
1986	Bandera negra		
1987	Policía		
1990	Aquí huele a muerto... (¡pues yo no he sido!)	Madre Elizabeth	
1991	El robobo de la jojoya	Clienta	
1995	Morirás en Chafarinas	Monja	
1996	Familia	Rosa	
