= Ella, él y sus millones =

1944 film

- Directed by: Juan de Orduña
- Starring: Rafael Durán; Josita Hernán; Roberto Rey; Luchy Soto; Luis Peña; Raúl Cancio; Guadalupe Muñoz Sampedro; José Isbert; Juan Calvo; Antonio Riquelme; Xan das Bolas; María Isbert
- Cinematography: Willy Goldberger
- Edited by: Juan Sierra
- Music by: Juan Quintero
- Distributed by: CIFESA
- Release date: 25 December 1944
- Running time: 100 minutes
- Country: Spain
- Language: Spanish

Ella, él y sus millones is a 1944 Spanish comedy film written and directed by Juan de Orduña.

The movie is based on the play written by Honorio Maura.
