= Parera (surname) =

Parera is a Catalan surname. Notable people with the surname include:

- Blas Parera (1777–1840), Spanish composer
- Manuel Parera (1907–1975), Spanish footballer
- Silvia Parera (born 1969), Spanish swimmer
- Valentín Parera (1895–1986), Spanish actor
