= Verónica Forqué =

Spanish actress (1955–2021)

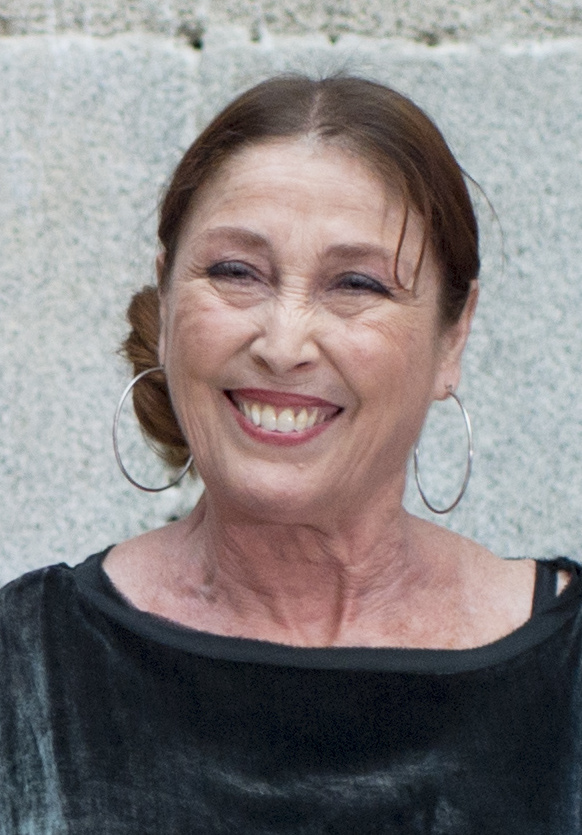
- Forqué in 2019
- Born: Verónica Forqué Vázquez-Vigo; 1 December 1955; Madrid, Spain
- Died: 13 December 2021 (aged 66); Madrid, Spain
- Occupation: Actress
- Years active: 1972–2021
- Spouse: Manuel Iborra (m. 1981; div. 2014)
- Children: 1
- Father: José María Forqué

Verónica Forqué Vázquez-Vigo (Spanish pronunciation: [beˈɾonika foɾˈke]; 1 December 1955 – 13 December 2021) was a Spanish stage, film and television actress. She was a four-time Goya Award winner, the most award-winning actress alongside Carmen Maura. She had a knack for characters "between ridiculous and tender, stunned and vehement".

== Biography ==
=== Background ===
Verónica Forqué Vázquez-Vigo was born in Madrid on 1 December 1955, to a family with an artistic background: her mother was the writer María del Carmen Vázquez-Vigo and her father was filmmaker José María Forqué. Her grandfather, José Vázquez Vigo, was a musician and composer. She had an older brother, film director Álvaro Forqué.

She began to study for a degree in psychology, but at the age of 17, switched to drama.

=== Beginnings ===
Her first film appearances were in the movie My Dearest Senorita, under the direction of Jaime de Armiñán in 1972 and her second appearance was in Una pareja... distinta, a movie directed by her father.

Onstage, she debuted in 1975, at age 19, with Núria Espert in the play Divinas palabras. Other early dramatic roles on stage include those of "Laura" in El zoo de cristal and "María" in María la mosca.

Stanley Kubrick selected Forqué for the European Spanish-language dub of Shelley Duvall (playing the role of "Wendy Torrance") in The Shining (1980).

She married director Manuel Iborra in 1981; they had a daughter, María.

In 1982, she featured in the television series Ramón y Cajal directed by her father; she played the wife of Santiago Ramón y Cajal, Silveria Fañanás García.

=== Breakout ===
Her career took a leap forward with her breakout performance as Cristal, "a toothy heart-of-gold hooker" in Pedro Almodóvar's 1984 film, What Have I Done to Deserve This? She landed her first major television role in the 1985 sitcom Platos rotos, earning a Fotogramas de Plata in 1986 for her performance as Loli. She won her first Goya Award with a supporting role in Fernando Trueba's 1986 film Year of Enlightment.

In 1988, she won the Goya Awards for both Best Actress and Best Supporting Actress, for her roles in La vida alegre and Moors and Christians, respectively. She and Emma Suárez are the only two to have won two Goyas in the same year. Of Forqué's performance as a doctor treating sexually transmitted diseases in La vida alegre, Paula Corroto wrote in El Confidencial, Forqué's "smile (and laughter) were forever in the hearts of everyone who saw this film. A comedian from head to toe."

Forqué played the lead in Almodóvar's Kika (1993). A review by Stanley Kauffmann in The New Republic said her part in the film was "a better role than her American debut in Jimmy Hollywood, but it doesn't make the most of this spirited comedienne." Janet Maslin, writing in The New York Times, found Forqué's performance "spirited and appealing, never in danger of being overpowered by [her] surroundings."

She starred in television series such as Pepa y Pepe (1995) and La vida de Rita (2003). The former series, loosely inspired by Roseanne and earning audience ratings breaking seven million viewers mark and 40% share, earned Forqué a great deal of popularity in Spain.

=== Late career ===
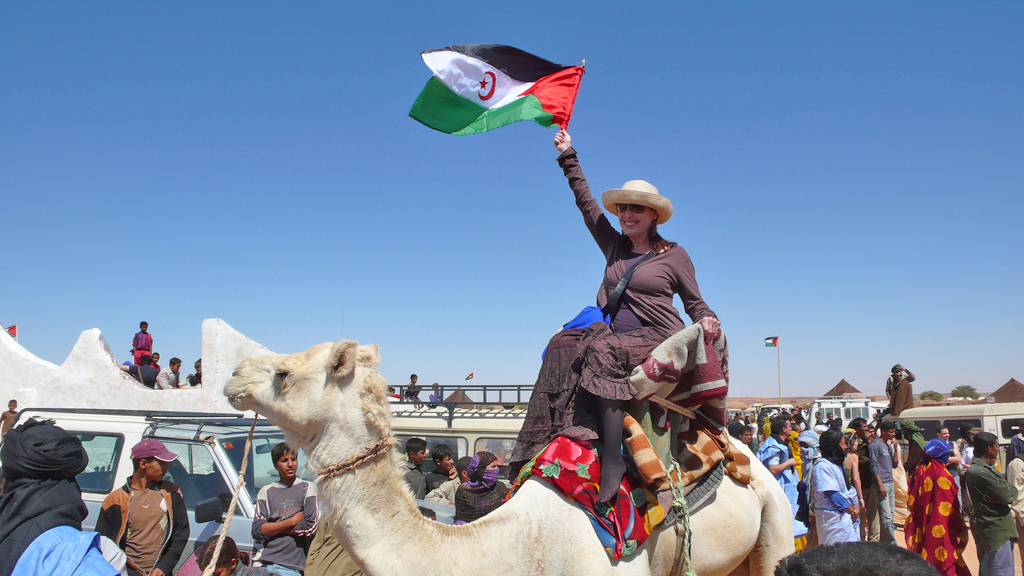
Forqué during the Sahara International Film Festival in 2007

Forqué fell into a depression in the wake of her 2014 separation from Iborra, a situation aggravated by the death of her brother Álvaro some months later.

In 2017, she won the Nacho Martínez award from the Gijón International Film Festival. At the 5th Feroz Awards (2018), Forqué received the Honorary Award, which recognised her long career.

One of Forqué's last starring roles was in the Ángeles Reiné's LGBTQ romantic comedy film So My Grandma's a Lesbian, playing Sofía, the lesbian partner of the character Rosa María Sardá played in her final role; the film was released in 2020 after Sardá's death.

A participant in the sixth season of the competitive reality television cooking show MasterChef Celebrity, she quit the show during the November 2021 semifinal, citing exhaustion.

=== Death ===
Forqué was found dead in her Madrid residence on 13 December 2021 at the age of 66. The cause of death was suicide by hanging. She left two posthumous performances in feature films: 1000 Miles from Christmas (released on 24 December 2021) and Espejo, espejo (released on 20 May 2022). She was also providing the voice for Rose in the upcoming animation series Pobre diablo, yet some scenes were still pending for recording; Buendía Estudios declined immediate comment on the show's future.

María Iborra, Verónica's daughter, wrote a book named No soy Verónica Forqué alongside Antonio Álamo, which tells the last moments in her life and the circumstances of her suicide caused by the depression worsened by MasterChef Celebrity. She previously tried to kill herself twice.

== Filmography ==
=== Film ===
Year	Title	Role	Notes	Ref
1976	El segundo poder			
1976	Madrid, Costa Fleming			
1977	La guerra de papá	Vítora		
1977	The Standard	Louise Lang		
1978	Las truchas			
1981	Todos me llaman Gato	Rosa		
1984	¿Qué he hecho yo para merecer esto? (What Have I Done to Deserve This?)	Cristal		
1985	Sé infiel y no mires con quién (Be Wanton and Tread No Shame)	Silvia		
1986	El año de las luces (Year of Enlightment)	Irene		
1986	Matador	Periodista		
1987	La vida alegre	Ana		
1987	Moros y cristianos (Moors and Christians)	Monique		
1988	Bajarse al moro (Going South Shopping)	Chusa		
1990	Don Juan, mi querido fantasma (Don Juan, My Dear Ghost)	Señora de Marquina		
1992	Salsa rosa (Pink Sauce)	Ana		
1992	Orquesta Club Virginia (Club Virginia Orchestra)	Presentadora TV egipcia		
1993	¿Por qué lo llaman amor cuando quieren decir sexo? (Why Do They Call It Love When They Mean Sex?)	Gloria		
1993	Kika	Kika		
1996	¿De qué se ríen las mujeres?	Luci		
1997	El tiempo de la felicidad (Time of Happiness)	Julia		
2001	Tiempos de azúcar	Isabel		
2001	Sin vergüenza (No Shame)	Isabel		
2001	Clara y Elena	Clara		
2006	Reinas (Queens)	Nuria		
2006	La dama boba (The Idiot Maiden)	Otavia		
2008	Enloquecidas (Crazy)	Barbara		
2012	Ali	Alicia		
2016	Tenemos que hablar (We Need to Talk)	Patricia		
2019	Salir del ropero (So My Grandma's a Lesbian)	Sofía		
2021	A mil kilómetros de la Navidad (1000 Miles from Christmas)	Blanca	Posthumous release	
2022	Espejo, espejo	Álvaro's mother	Posthumous release	

=== Television ===
Year	Title	Role	Notes	Ref
1982	Ramón y Cajal: Historia de una voluntad	Silveria Fañanás García		
1985	Platos rotos	Loli		
1990	Eva y Adán, agencia matrimonial	Eva Salvador		
1995	Pepa y Pepe	Pepa		
2003	La vida de Rita	Rita		
2014–15	La que se avecina	María Teresa Sáenz de Tejada	Season 8	
2019	Días de navidad (Three Days of Christmas)	Adela		
2019	Amar es para siempre	Amparo Sáez de Abascal	Recurring role. Season 9. 4 episodes	
2020	Señoras del (h)AMPA	Cándida	Guest role. Season 2	

== Accolades ==
Year	Award	Category	Work	Result	Ref.
1986	35th Fotogramas de Plata	Best Television Performance	Platos rotos	Won	
1987	1st Goya Awards	Best Supporting Actress	Year of Enlightment	Won	
1988	2nd Goya Awards	Best Actress	La vida alegre	Won	
1988	2nd Goya Awards	Best Supporting Actress	Moors and Christians	Won	
1990	4th Goya Awards	Best Actress	Bajarse al moro	Nominated	
1994	8th Goya Awards	Best Actress	Kika	Won	
2020	29th Actors and Actresses Union Awards	Best Stage Actress in a Leading Role	Las cosas que sé que son verdad	Won	
2020	23rd Max Awards	Best Leading Actress	Las cosas que sé que son verdad	Won	
