= Pepa y Pepe =

Television series

- Genre: Sitcom
- Directed by: Manuel Iborra; Manuel Armán
- Starring: Verónica Forqué; Tito Valverde; María Adánez; Silvia Abascal
- Opening theme: "Suspiros de España" by Antonio Álvarez Alonso
- Country of origin: Spain
- Original language: Spanish
- No. of seasons: 2
- No. of episodes: 34

Production
- Running time: 25 min (approx.)
- Production companies: TVE; Bombón Helado

Original release
- Network: TVE1
- Release: 15 January – 26 December 1995

Pepa y Pepe is a Spanish sitcom television series with costumbrista themes, starring Tito Valverde, Verónica Forqué, María Adánez and Silvia Abascal. It aired in 1995 on TVE1.

== Premise ==
The series consists of the comedic portrayal of the daily problems endured by a working-class family. The family is formed by Pepa (Verónica Forqué), Pepe (Tito Valverde), María (María Adánez), Clarita (Silvia Abascal) and Jorge (Carlos Vilches). Besides the working-class background, it also differentiated from other popular Spanish sitcoms at the time such as Farmacia de guardia or Médico de familia due to its somewhat more irreverent sense of humour.

== Cast ==
Main

- Verónica Forqué as Pepa, the mother of the family, is a caring person.
- Tito Valverde as Pepe, the father of the family, a worker in a factory of folkloric dolls and a wimp.
- Isabel Ordaz as Julia, Pepa's longtime friend.
- María Adánez as María, the eldest daughter of the family, who dreams about becoming an actress.
- Silvia Abascal as Clarita, the second daughter of the family, sarcastic and sensible teenager.
- Carlos Vilches as Jorge, the youngest member of the family.

Other (including guest roles)

- Juan Echanove as Francis.
- Roberto Enríquez as Pol.
- Miqui Puig as Charly.
- Santiago Segura as Alberto.
- Jorge Sanz.
- Ángel de Andrés.
- Pilar Bardem.
- Gracia Olayo.
- Antonio Resines.
- Santiago Ramos.
- Miriam Díaz-Aroca.
- Clara Sanchís.

== Production and release ==
Pepa y Pepe was loosely inspired by the American sitcom Roseanne. Produced by Bombón Helado, the series was directed by Manuel Iborra and Manuel Armán. The opening credits featured a version of the popular pasodoble "Suspiros de España", by Antonio Álvarez Alonso. The first episode premiered on 10 January 1995. The broadcasting run consisted of two seasons, featuring, respectively, 20 and 14 episodes. The last episode aired on 26 December 1995.

The series obtained great audience ratings, breaking the 7 million viewer mark, and obtaining a peak share of 40.1%, as well as it also brought forward the acting careers of María Adánez and Silvia Abascal.
