= Rivelles =

Rivelles is a surname. Notable people with the surname include:

- Amparo Rivelles (11 February 1925 – 7 November 2013) was a Spanish actress.
- Jaime Rivelles Magalló (1861–1918) was a Spanish actor and a theatre director.
- Rafael Rivelles (23 December 1898 – 3 December 1971) was a Spanish actor.
