= Sighs of Triana =

1955 film

- Directed by: Ramón Torrado
- Written by: Antonio Guzmán Merino; Benito Perojo; Ramón Torrado; Ricardo Blasco
- Based on: Sighs of Spain by Antonio Álvarez Alonso
- Produced by: Benito Perojo; Miguel Tudela
- Starring: Paquita Rico; Antonio Riquelme; Juan Calvo
- Cinematography: Antonio L. Ballesteros; Jean Lehérissey
- Edited by: Antonio Ramírez de Loaysa
- Music by: Cristóbal Halffter; Daniel Montorio; José Ruiz de Azagra; Juan Solano; Antonio Álvarez Alonso
- Production company: Producciones Benito Perojo
- Distributed by: CIFESA
- Release date: 16 December 1955
- Running time: 85 minutes
- Country: Spain
- Language: Spanish

Sighs of Triana (Spanish: Suspiros de Triana) is a 1955 Spanish musical film directed by Ramón Torrado and starring Paquita Rico, Antonio Riquelme and Juan Calvo. It was shot in Gevacolor. Interiors were shot at the CEA Studios in Madrid. The film's sets were designed by the art director Sigfrido Burmann. It is a remake of the 1939 film Sighs of Spain by Benito Perojo.

== Main cast ==
- Paquita Rico as Reyes
- Ángel Sampedro 'Angelillo' as Carlos Ojeda
- Antonio Riquelme as Relámpago Heredia
- Juan Calvo as Don Atiliano Revuelta
- Manuel de Juan as Don Porfirio Zapata
- Josefina Serratosa as Sole
- Francisco Bernal as Tio Catre
- Manuel Requena as Gordo eufórico en la taberna
- Goyo Lebrero as Petiti
- Esperanza Rico as Niña
- Elías Rodríguez as Niño
- César Torrado as Niño
- Carmen Macarena as Dorita -la gaditana

== Bibliography ==
- Castro de Paz, José Luis & Pérez Jaime, Pena. Ramón Torrado: cine de consumo no franquismo. Consellería de Cultura e Xuventude, 1993.
- De España, Rafael. Directory of Spanish and Portuguese film-makers and films. Greenwood Press, 1994.
