= Song of Dolores =

1947 film

- Film poster
- Directed by: Benito Perojo
- Written by: Manuel Acevedo; Francisco Madrid
- Produced by: Ricardo Núñez
- Starring: Imperio Argentina
- Cinematography: Antonio Merayo
- Edited by: Jorge Gárate
- Release date: 1947
- Running time: 85 minutes
- Country: Spain
- Language: Spanish

Song of Dolores (Spanish: La copla de la Dolores) is a 1947 Spanish drama film directed by Benito Perojo, written by Francisco Madrid. It was entered into the 1947 Cannes Film Festival.

== Cast ==
- Alfredo Alaria
- Imperio Argentina - Dolores
- Lola Beltrán
- Ricardo Canales - Mariano
- José Castro
- Manuel Díaz González
- Manolito Díaz - Lazaro
- Manuel Díaz
- Enrique Diosdado - Melchior
- Domingo Márquez
- Antonio Martínez
- Herminia Mas
- Andrés Mejuto
- Amadeo Novoa - Cirilo
- Lilian Valmar
