= You Had to Be a Gypsy =

1953 Mexican film directed by Rafael Baledón

You Had To Be a Gypsy
- Directed by: Rafael Baledón
- Written by: Janet Alcoriza; Luis Alcoriza; Fernando Galiana; Ramón Obón
- Produced by: Édouard Harispuru
- Starring: Pedro Infante; Carmen Sevilla; Estrellita Castro
- Cinematography: Raúl Martínez Solares
- Edited by: Alfredo Rosas Priego
- Production companies: Cesáreo González Producciones Cinematográficas; Cinematográfica Filmex; Suevia Films
- Distributed by: Suevia Films
- Release date: 19 November 1953
- Running time: 88 minutes
- Countries: Mexico; Spain
- Language: Spanish

You Had To Be a Gypsy (Spanish: Gitana tenías que ser) is a 1953 Mexican-Spanish romantic comedy film directed by Rafael Baledón and starring Pedro Infante, Carmen Sevilla and Estrellita Castro.

== Plot ==
Pastora de los Reyes (Carmen Sevilla) is a beautiful Spanish woman who arrives in Mexico hired to film a movie. The main protagonists will receive her at the airport, among them is the man who will play the heartthrob, Pablo, (Pedro Infante), a little-known mariachi who has been chosen to turn him into a new idol. Automatically, both of them don't like each other and during the filming there are discussions, discussions that lead to a deep love.

== Cast ==
- Pedro Infante as Pablo Mendoza
- Carmen Sevilla as Pastora de los Reyes
- Estrellita Castro as Tía Paca
- Ángel Garasa as Tío
- Pedro de Aguillón as Chalío
- José Jasso "El Ojón" as Tito del Valle
- Florencio Castelló as Primo Tumbita
- Carlos Múzquiz as Productor
- Chula Prieto as Marta Avilés
- Armando Calvo
- Eulalio González «Piporro» as Mariachi
- Elvira Lodi as Maquillista
- José Pardavé as Vendedor
- José Pidal as Ingeniero sonido
- Roberto G. Rivera as Mariachi
- Ernesto Velázquez
- Hernán Vera as Dueño de la tasca

== Bibliography ==
- Heredia, Juanita. Transnational Latina Narratives in the Twenty-first Century. Palgrave Macmillan, 2009.
