= Wine Cellars =

1930 film

- Directed by: Benito Perojo
- Written by: Benito Perojo
- Based on: La bodega by Vicente Blasco Ibáñez
- Starring: Colette Darfeuil; Valentín Parera; Enrique Rivero
- Cinematography: Paul Cotteret; Albert Duverger
- Edited by: María Paredes
- Music by: Enric Granados; Joaquín Turina
- Production companies: CGC; Julio César films
- Distributed by: Julio César Films
- Release date: 26 February 1930
- Running time: 87 minutes
- Countries: France; Spain
- Language: Spanish

Wine Cellars (Spanish: La bodega) is a 1930 French-Spanish film directed by Benito Perojo and starring Colette Darfeuil, Valentín Parera and Enrique Rivero. It was originally made as a silent film, with sound added later. Based on the film's reputation, Perojo was invited to Hollywood to make Spanish-language films for the major studios. It was shot at the Joinville Studios in Paris and on location in Cádiz and Seville. The film's sets were designed by the art director Lucien Carré.

== Cast ==
- María Luz Callejo
- Joaquín Carrasco
- Jean Coste as Pablo Dupont
- Régina Dalthy
- Colette Darfeuil as La Marquesita
- Gabriel Gabrio as Fermin
- Madame Guillaume
- Valentín Parera as Don Luis
- Concha Piquer as Maria Luz
- Enrique Rivero as Raphaël
