= The Charm of Seville =

1931 film

- Directed by: Benito Perojo
- Written by: Carlos Reyles (novel); Benito Perojo
- Produced by: Louis de Carbonnat; Jean de Merly; Mario Nalpas; Benito Perojo
- Cinematography: Gruner; Juan Pacheco 'Vandel'
- Edited by: Benito Perojo
- Release date: 4 April 1931
- Running time: 90 minutes
- Countries: France; Germany; Spain
- Language: Spanish

The Charm of Seville is a 1931 (Spanish title:El embrujo de Sevilla) French-German-Spanish drama film directed by Benito Perojo. It was a Spanish-language film made by the director Benito Berojo in studios in France and Germany because the sound equipment was better than in Spain. location shots of Seville were also added. The film's sets were designed by the art director Fernando Mignoni. It is now considered a lost film. A separate French-language version was also released.

== Cast ==
- María Fernanda Ladrón de Guevara as Pastora
- Rafael Rivelles as Paco Quiñones
- María Luz Callejo as Rosarito
- María Dalbaicín as Pura
- José González Marín as El Pitoche
- Rayito as Himself

== Bibliography ==
- Bentley, Bernard. A Companion to Spanish Cinema. Boydell & Brewer 2008.
