= Germaine Montero =

French actress (1909–2000)

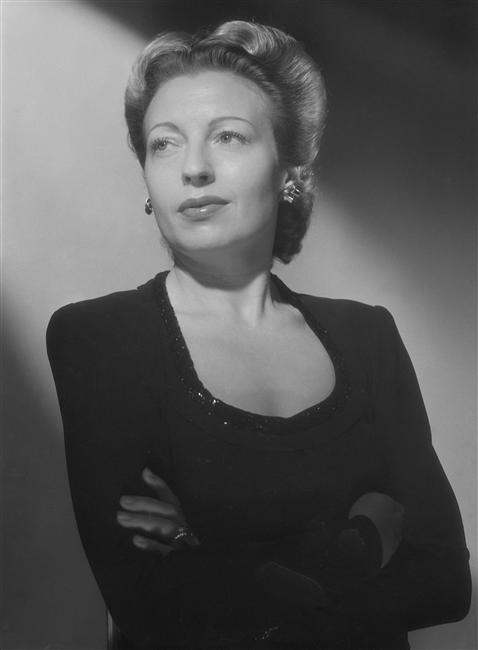
- 1946 portrait by Studio Harcourt
- Born: 22 October 1909; Paris, France
- Died: 29 June 2000 (aged 90); Orange, France
- Other name: Germaine Berthe Caroline Heygel
- Occupations: Actress, singer
- Years active: 1934–1988 (film & TV)

Germaine Montero (1909–2000) was a French singer and a stage, television and film actress.

== Partial filmography ==
- Sapho (1934) - Madame Sombreuse
- The Sin of Rogelia Sanchez (1940) - Rogelia Sanchez
- Saint Rogelia (1940) - Rogelia
- Le soleil a toujours raison (1943) - Georgia
- Casimir (1950) - Angelita Garcia y Gonzalez
- Lady Paname (1950) - Mary-Flor - une chanteuse finie mais capricieuse
- Operation Magali (1953) - Magali
- Knave of Hearts (1954) - Marcelle
- La bella Otero (1954) - Singer (Danse Danse)
- Thirteen at the Table (1955) - Consuelo Koukouwski
- Don Juan (1956)
- Dangerous Games (1958) - Mme Leroy-Gomez
- Le Masque de fer (1962) - Ann d'Autriche
- The Merry Widow (1962) - Anna, Wirtin von "Chez Anna"
- Any Number Can Win (1963) - Mme Verlot
- Dis-moi qui tuer (1965) - Mme Fayard
- The Game Is Over (1966) - Guest
- Caïn de nulle part (1970) - La mère
- L'homme qui vient de la nuit (1971) - Mama Angelo
- Jean Vilar, une belle vie (1972) - Herself
- Une saison dans la vie d'Emmanuel (1973) - La grand-mère
- Le chant du départ (1975) - Mme Lebris
- Robert et Robert (1978) - Mme Goldman
- The South (1983) - Doña Rosario
- Stress (1984) - Madame D'Ambray

== Bibliography ==
- Conway, Kelley. Chanteuse in the City: The Realist Singer in French Film. University of California Press, 2004.
