= Luchy Soto =

Spanish actress (1919–1970)

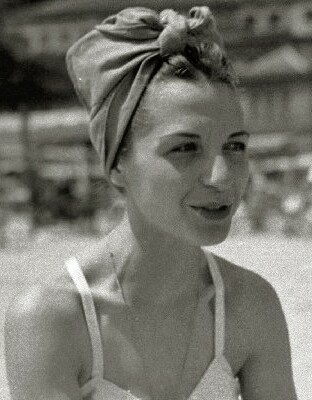
- Soto at Ondarreta beach, San Sebastián in 1946
- Born: Lucía Soto Muñoz; 21 February 1919; Madrid, Spain
- Died: 5 October 1970 (aged 51); Madrid, Spain
- Occupation: Actress
- Years active: 1935–1970 (film)
- Spouse: Luis Peña
- Parents: Manuel Soto (father); Guadalupe Muñoz Sampedro (mother)

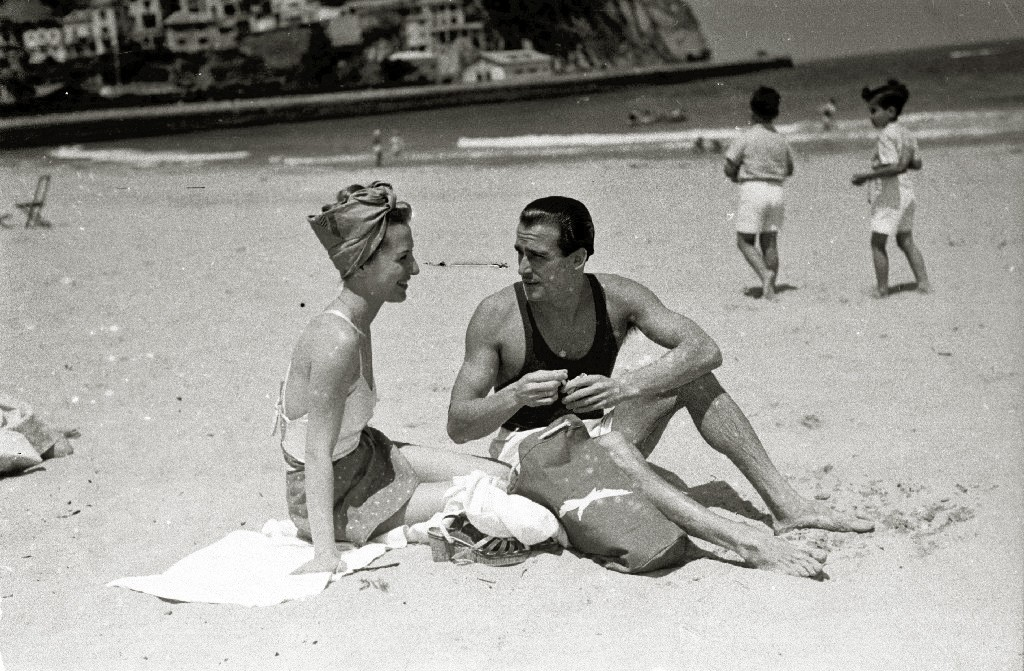
Luchy Soto and Luis Peña at Ondarreta beach, San Sebastián in 1946

Lucía "Luchy" Soto Muñoz (1919–1970) was a Spanish film and television actress. She was the daughter of the actors Guadalupe Muñoz Sampedro and Manuel Soto. She married actor Luis Peña in 1946.

== Filmography ==
Year	Title	Role	Notes
1935	La bien pagada		
1935	El ciento trece	Gilberta	
1936	Morena Clara	Encarnación	
1936	The Dancer and the Worker		
1936	Las tres gracias	Noble Grace	
1937	World Crisis		
1937	Madre Alegría	Gloria	
1937	En busca de una canción	Adelaida	
1939	The Strange Marchioness	Rosa	
1940	Rumbo al Cairo	La amiga de Celia	
1940	The Unloved Woman	Acacia	
1940	El famoso Carballeira		
1941	¡Harka!	Amparo	
1941	Escuadrilla	Ana María	
1941	Sarasate		
1942	Journey to Nowhere	Rosario Reyes	
1943	¡¡Campeones!!	Paulita	
1943	La boda de Quinita Flores	Quinita Flores	
1943	Autumn Roses	Josefina	
1944	Fin de curso	Celia	
1944	Tuvo la culpa Adán	Marisa Giner	
1944	El hombre que las enamora	María Elena Puertollano / Beatriz	
1944	Ella, él y sus millones	Noemí de Hinojares	
1959	El Salvador	Elizabeth	
1959	El redentor		
1962	Cuidado con las personas formales	Mercedes	
1963	Un demonio con ángel	Amparo	
1964	Vacaciones para Ivette	Julia	
1965	Television Stories	Monja #2	
1966	Lola, espejo oscuro	Mapi de Armengol	
1966	Operación Plus Ultra		
1966	Las viudas	Teresa	(segment "El Aniversario")
1967	Crónica de nueve meses	Catalina - madre de Mercedes	
1967	Operación cabaretera	Nati	
1967	A Nun at the Crossroads	Madeleine's friend #3	
1968	Los subdesarrollados	Doña Acacia	
1969	De Picos Pardos a la ciudad		
1969	La canción del olvido	Casilda	
1969	Mi marido y sus complejos	Clienta tienda musical	
1969	Hamelín	Lovaina	
1969	Cuatro noches de boda	Mujer de Miguel	
1970	Una señora estupenda	Otilia	
1970	The Garden of Delights	Luchy	(final film role)

== Bibliography ==
- D'Lugo, Marvin. Guide to the Cinema of Spain. Greenwood Publishing, 1997.
