= The Barber of Seville (1938 film) =

1938 film

- Directed by: Benito Perojo
- Written by: Beaumarchais (play); Bobby E. Lüthge; Benito Perojo; Antonio Quintero
- Produced by: Helmut Beck; Kurt Hartmann; Johann W. Ther
- Starring: Miguel Ligero; Estrellita Castro; Roberto Rey
- Cinematography: Bruno Mondi
- Edited by: Willy Zeyn
- Music by: Walter Sieber
- Production companies: Fabrikation Deutscher Filme; Hispano Filmproduktion
- Distributed by: Cando-Film
- Release date: 16 April 1938
- Running time: 90 minutes
- Countries: Germany; Spain
- Language: Spanish

The Barber of Seville (Spanish: El barbero de Sevilla) is a 1938 German-Spanish musical film directed by Benito Perojo and starring Miguel Ligero, Estrellita Castro, and Roberto Rey.

The film's sets were designed by Gustav A. Knauer.

== Cast ==
- Miguel Ligero as Bartolo
- Estrellita Castro as Zigeunerin
- Roberto Rey as Figaro
- Pedro Barreto as Tabernero
- Manuel Collado
- J. Noé de la Peña as Sargento
- José Escandel as Polizonte
- Pedro Fernández Cuenca as Coronel
- Anselmo Fernández
- Tina Gascó as Susanna
- Fernando Granada as Conde de Almaviva
- Joaquín Reig as Notario
- Raquel Rodrigo as Rosina
- Alberto Romea as Don Basilio

== See also ==
- The Barber of Seville, 1775 play

== Bibliography ==
- Peiró, Eva Woods (2012). White Gypsies: Race and Stardom in Spanish Musical Films. Minneapolis: University of Minnesota Press. ISBN 978-0-8166-4584-8.
