= Luis Peña (actor) =

Spanish actor (1918–1977)

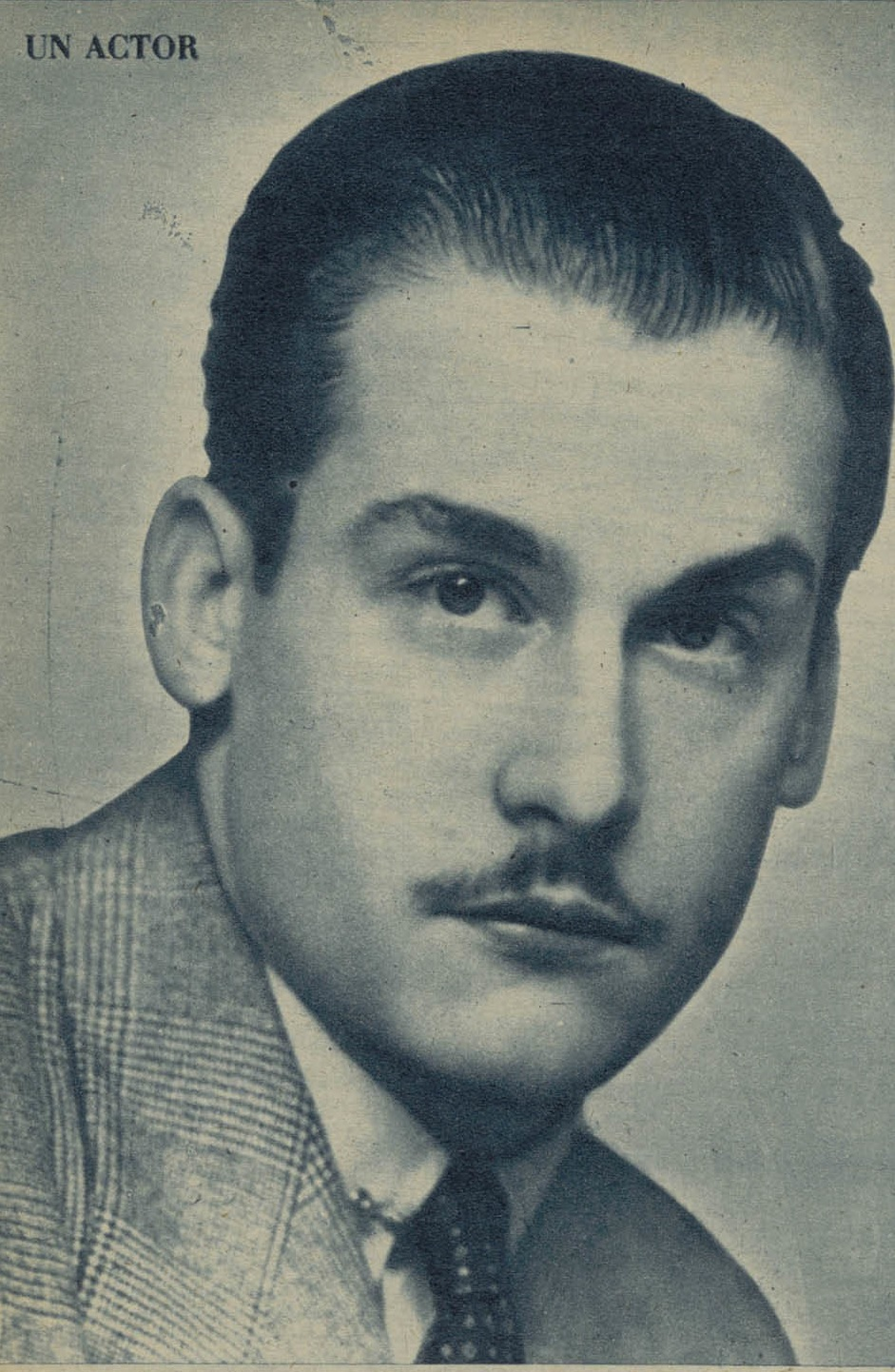
- Born: Luis Peña Martínez-Illescas; 20 June 1918; Santander, Spain
- Died: 29 March 1977 (aged 58); Madrid, Spain
- Spouse: Luchy Soto
- Relatives: Pastora Peña (sister)

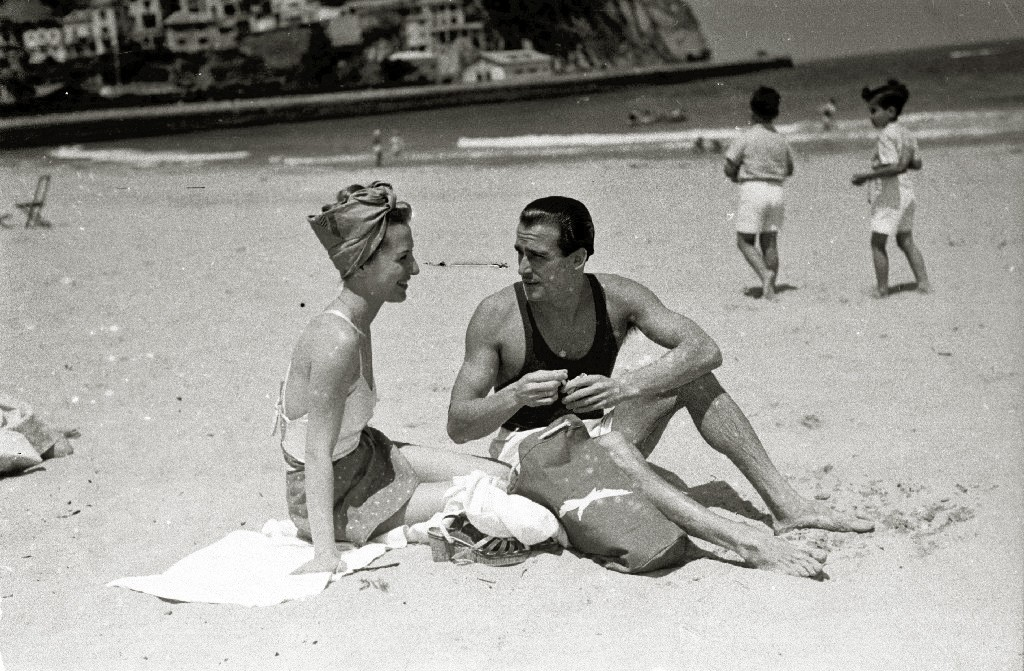
Luchy Soto and Luis Peña at Ondarreta beach, San Sebastián in 1946

Luis Peña Martínez-Illescas (20 June 1918, in Santander – 29 March 1977, in Madrid) was a Spanish actor.

Peña came from a family of actors and performed in films and theater. His sister was the actress Pastora Peña. In 1946, he married Luchy Soto; the two formed a stage company. He worked on filmed plays for television which were shown on Televisión Española in the 1960s. At the end of his career, he acted for Carlos Saura.

== Selected filmography ==
- The Birth of Salome (1940)
- Follow the Legion (1942)
- Ella, él y sus millones (1944)
- Bamboo (1945)
- The Holy Queen (1947)
- The Maragatan Sphinx (1950)
- Surcos (1951)
- Calle mayor (1956)
- Amanecer en puerta oscura (1957)
- Back to the Door (1959)
- The Red Rose (1960)
- Due mafiosi nel far west, directed by Giorgio Simonelli (1964)
- Due mafiosi contro Goldginger, directed by Giorgio Simonelli (1965)
- I due parà, directed by Lucio Fulci (1966)
- Z7 Operation Rembrandt (1966)
- El jardín de las delicias (1970)
- A House Without Boundaries (1972)
- La prima Angélica (1974)
