= Saint Rogelia =

- Directed by: Roberto de Ribón
- Written by: Alberto Moravia; Armando Palacio Valdés (novel); Roberto de Ribón; Mario Soldati
- Starring: Germaine Montero; Rafael Rivelles; Juan de Landa
- Cinematography: Francesco Izzarelli; Jan Stallich; Augusto Tiezzi
- Edited by: Mario Bonotti
- Music by: Federico Moreno Torroba
- Production companies: Producciones Hispánicas; Società Anonima Finanziamento Industrie Cinematografiche
- Release date: 15 January 1940
- Country: Spain
- Language: Spanish

Saint Rogelia (Spanish:Santa Rogelia) is a 1940 Spanish drama film directed by Roberto de Ribón and starring Germaine Montero, Rafael Rivelles and Juan de Landa. It was shot at Cinecitta in Rome as part of an agreement between Francisco Franco's Nationalists and the Italian government A separate Italian-language version The Sin of Rogelia Sanchez was produced at the same time. The film is based on the 1926 novel Santa Rogelia by Armando Palacio Valdés. It was remade in 1962 by Rafael Gil.

The film's sets were designed by Guido Fiorini.

== Cast ==
- Germaine Montero as Rogelia
- Rafael Rivelles as Fernando
- Juan de Landa as Máximo
- Pastora Peña as Cristina
- Julia Caba Alba as Marciala
- Luis Riera Sánchez
- Porfiria Sanchíz as Presidenta de la Junta
- Rafael Calvo as Dr. Olivar
- Emilio García Ruiz as Pedro
- Luis Peña padre as Pepe

== Bibliography ==
- Bentley, Bernard. A Companion to Spanish Cinema. Boydell & Brewer 2008.
