= The Moorish Queen (1937 film) =

- Spanish: La reina mora
- Directed by: Eusebio Fernández Ardavín
- Written by: Serafín Álvarez Quintero (play); Joaquín Álvarez Quintero (play); Eusebio Fernández Ardavín
- Starring: María Arias; Raquel Rodrigo; Alejandrina Caro
- Cinematography: Fred Mandel
- Edited by: Henri Taverna
- Music by: Joaquín Rodrigo; José Serrano
- Production company: Cifesa
- Distributed by: Cifesa
- Release date: 4 October 1937
- Running time: 90 minutes
- Country: Spain
- Language: Spanish

The Moorish Queen (Spanish: La reina mora) is a 1937 Spanish musical film directed by Eusebio Fernández Ardavín and starring María Arias, Raquel Rodrigo and Alejandrina Caro.

The film's sets were designed by Santiago Ontañón.

== Plot ==
Coral and Esteban are the two young men who are in love. When they arrived at the party though, the love changes into a quarrel in which Coral must calm down his opponent and Esteban is assigned to solve the matter. As expected, the fight ends with Esteban shooting his opponent and is sent to jail. Coral, saddened that his friend is confined, visits Esteban's brother in a Sevillian house to whom he tells of Esteban's deprivation of liberty. Their friendship will give rise to presumptuous Don Juans to launch their conquest for freedom and tales of legends.

== Cast ==
- María Arias as Coral
- Raquel Rodrigo as Mercedes
- Alejandrina Caro as Doña Juana
- Pedro Terol as Esteban
- Antonio Gil Varela 'Varillas' as Don Nuez
- Valeriano Ruiz París as Miguel Ángel
- Erasmo Pascual as Cotufa
- José Córdoba as Peleón
- Carmen Vázquez as ballerina
- Capelillo as singer
- Manolito Heras as The Boy of the Birds
- J. Aguilar as Pepe López
- Enrique Salvador as Señor Pepe
- Anita Ramallo as Laurita
- Srta. Albillana as Isabel

== Reception ==
The film was noted for the presence of seguidillas in the prison scene.

== Legacy ==
The film was screened, with the 1955 version, as part of the presentation of the production of the original play in Madrid in 2013.
