= Football, Love, and Bullfighting =

1929 film

- Spanish: Fútbol, amor y toros
- Directed by: Florián Rey
- Written by: Florián Rey
- Produced by: Juan Figuera Vargas
- Starring: Guerrita; Ricardo Núñez; Modesto Rivas
- Cinematography: Alberto Arroyo
- Music by: Ricardo Urgoiti
- Production company: Selecciones Núñez
- Release date: 1929
- Country: Spain
- Language: Spanish

Football, Love, and Bullfighting (Spanish: Fútbol, amor y toros) is a 1929 Spanish film directed by Florián Rey and starring Guerrita, Ricardo Núñez and Modesto Rivas. The film was Rey's first sound film, but he was dissatisfied with the level of sound recording and made his next film in France.

== Cast ==
- Guerrita as flamenco singer
- Ricardo Núñez
- Modesto Rivas
- Carlos Rufart
- Blanca Suarez
