= Pastora Peña =

Spanish actress

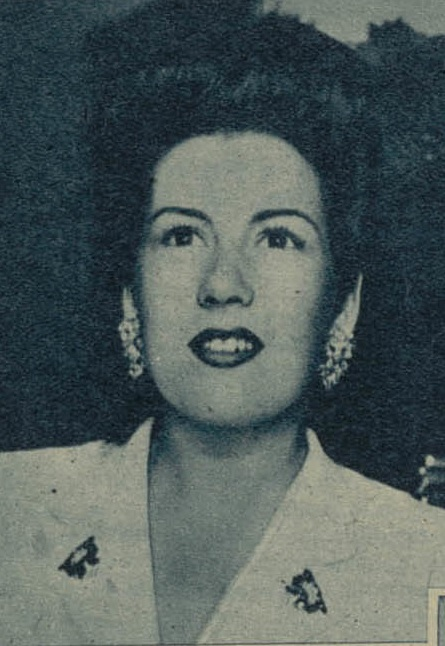
- Born: Pastora Peña Martínez-Illescas; 24 July 1920; Madrid, Spain
- Died: 10 October 2003 (aged 83); Madrid, Spain
- Occupation: Actress
- Years active: 1936-1979 (film & TV)
- Relatives: Luis Peña (brother)

Pastora Peña Martínez-Illescas (July 24, 1920 – October 10, 2003) was a Spanish film actress. Her brother was the actor Luis Peña.

== Filmography ==
| Year | Title | Role | Notes |
|---|---|---|---|
| 1936 | Nuestra Natacha | Marga | |
| 1937 | World Crisis | | |
| 1938 | Las cinco advertencias de Satanás | | |
| 1940 | The Sin of Rogelia Sanchez | | |
| 1940 | Saint Rogelia | Cristina | |
| 1940 | L'uomo della legione | Anna | |
| 1941 | Pepe Conde | María Luisa | |
| 1941 | Porque te vi llorar | María Victoria | |
| 1942 | Fortunato | | |
| 1942 | Flora y Mariana | Paulita | |
| 1942 | El frente de los suspiros | Reyes | |
| 1944 | Lessons in Good Love | Clarita | |
| 1948 | Guest of Darkness | Dora | |
| 1949 | Una noche en blanco | Natalia | |
| 1956 | Uncle Hyacynth | Vendedora de sellos | |
| 1967 | Another's Wife | Madre de Loli | |
| 1967 | La mujer de otro | | |
| 1973 | Una monja y un Don Juan | | |

== Bibliography ==
- Labanyi, Jo & Pavlović, Tatjana. A Companion to Spanish Cinema. John Wiley & Sons, 2012.
