= Operation Magali =

1953 film

- Directed by: László V. Kish
- Written by: Maurice Dekobra; Laslo V. Kish; Marcel Rivet
- Based on: Operation Magali by Maurice Dekobra
- Produced by: Ben Barkay; Pierre Gurgo-Salice; Fernand Weill
- Starring: Raymond Souplex; Nicole Maurey; Germaine Montero
- Cinematography: Raymond Clunie
- Edited by: Emma Le Chanois
- Music by: Joseph Kosma
- Production company: Lux Compagnie Cinématographique de France
- Distributed by: Lux Compagnie Cinématographique de France
- Release date: 15 May 1953
- Running time: 91 minutes
- Country: France
- Language: French

Operation Magali (French: Opération Magali) is a 1953 French thriller film directed by László V. Kish and starring Raymond Souplex, Nicole Maurey and Germaine Montero. It is based on the 1951 novel Operation Magali by Maurice Dekobra. It was shot at the Victorine Studios in Nice. The film's sets were designed by the art director Aimé Bazin.

== Synopsis ==
Magali is the moll of a gang leader, but jealous of his behaviour towards a younger woman she threatens to go the police and inform about his activities. The gangster wants her silenced and turns to Mario, a retired criminal, to do the hit. Reluctantly he agrees but approaches the police for help, who advise him to play along with the scheme. When Magali is then found murdered, suspicion naturally turns to Mario.

== Cast ==
- Raymond Souplex as Commissaire Paoli
- André Le Gall as Mario Boulard
- Nicole Maurey as Manon
- Germaine Montero as Magali
- Philippe Nicaud as Le guitariste
- Georges Flamant as Zacco
- Pierre Sergeol
- Made Siamé
- Henri Marchand
- Fanny Mauve
- Bob Ingarao
- Catherine Gay
- Liane Marlene
- Isabelle Eber

== Bibliography ==
- Parish, James Robert & Pitts, Michael R. The Great Spy Pictures. Scarecrow Press, 1974.
