= Ricardo Núñez =

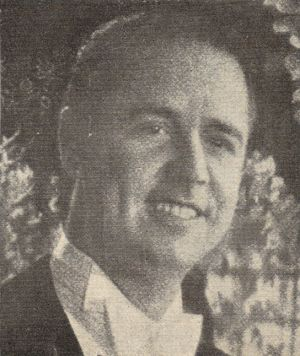
- Born: 16 July 1904; Betanzos, Galicia, Spain
- Died: 16 June 1998 (aged 93); Palma, Majorca, Spain
- Other name: Ricardo Núñez Lisarrague
- Occupations: Actor, Producer, Director, Screenwriter
- Years active: 1927-1977 (film)

Ricardo Núñez (July 16, 1904 – June 16, 1998) was a Spanish actor, screenwriter, producer and film director. He starred in the 1934 comedy film World Crisis (1934).

== Selected filmography ==
=== Actor ===
- The Rascal of Madrid (1926)
- Sister San Sulpicio (1927)
- The Mysteries of Tangier (1927)
- Football, Love, and Bullfighting (1929)
- The Cursed Village (1930)
- Nights in Port Said (1932)
- World Crisis (1934)
- Bound for Cairo (1935)

=== Producer ===
- The Songstress (1946)
- Song of Dolores (1947)

== Bibliography ==
- Bentley, Bernard. A Companion to Spanish Cinema. Boydell & Brewer 2008.
