= Journey to Nowhere =

- Directed by: Rafael Gil
- Written by: José Santugini; Rafael Gil
- Starring: Antonio Casal; Luchy Soto; Alberto Romea
- Cinematography: Isidoro Goldberger
- Edited by: Juan Serra
- Music by: Juan Quintero
- Production company: CIFESA
- Distributed by: CIFESA
- Release date: 25 September 1942
- Running time: 73 minutes
- Country: Spain
- Language: Spanish

Journey to Nowhere (Spanish: Viaje sin destino) is a 1942 Spanish comedy film directed by Rafael Gil and starring Antonio Casal, Luchy Soto and Alberto Romea.

== Synopsis ==
The "Panoramas" travel agency is going through a precarious financial situation and to advertise itself organizes a journey without a destination: several passengers get on their bus and set off aimlessly.

== Cast ==
- Luchy Soto as Rosario
- Blanca Pozas as Doña O.
- Fuensanta Lorente
- Antonio Casal as Poveda
- Alberto Romea as Garviza
- Miguel Pozanco
- Manuel Arbó as Rianza
- José Prada as Bráñez
- Jorge León as Venancio
- Pedro Cabré as Presidente
- Valeriano Ruiz París as Consejero
- Alberto López
- Camino Garrigó
- Manrique Gil
- Joaquín Torréns
- Pedro Mascaró
- Vicente Vega
- Joaquín Cuquerella

== Bibliography ==
- Labanyi, Jo & Pavlović, Tatjana. A Companion to Spanish Cinema. John Wiley & Sons, 2012.
