= Nights in Port Said =

1932 film

- Directed by: Leo Mittler
- Written by: Walter Mehring
- Starring: Renée Héribel; Gustav Diessl; Oskar Homolka
- Music by: Francis Gromon; Marcel Lattès
- Production company: Les Studios Paramount
- Distributed by: Les Films Paramount
- Release date: 1932
- Running time: 84 minutes
- Country: France
- Language: French

Nights in Port Said (French: Les nuits de Port Said) is a 1932 French drama film directed by Leo Mittler and starring Renée Héribel, Gustav Diessl and Oskar Homolka. It was shot at the Joinville Studios in Paris. The film's sets were designed by the art director Alfred Junge. It was produced and distributed by the French subsidiary of Paramount Pictures.

== Cast ==
- Renée Héribel as Charlotte
- Gustav Diessl as Le matelot Hans
- Oskar Homolka as Winston Winkler
- Marcel Vallée as L'oncle
- Leonard Steckel as Le levantin
- Jean Worms as Le tenancier de l'agence
- José Davert
- Philiberte Lokay
- Armand Lurville
- Ricardo Núñez
- Nadia Sibirskaïa

== Bibliography ==
- Waldman, Harry & Slide, Anthony. Hollywood and the Foreign Touch: A Dictionary of Foreign Filmmakers and Their Films from America, 1910-1995. Scarecrow Press, 1996.
