= Juan Calvo (actor) =

Spanish actor

- Born: 22 May 1892; Onteniente Valencia, Spain
- Died: 7 March 1962 (aged 69); Madrid, Spain
- Occupation: Actor
- Years active: 1934–1962 (film)

Juan Calvo (1892–1962) was a Spanish stage and film actor. Noted for his comedy roles, he was the father of the actor Armando Calvo who was born while he was touring Puerto Rico.

== Selected filmography ==
- Lucrezia Borgia (1940)
- Inspector Vargas (1940)
- Tosca (1941)
- Captain Tempest (1942)
- Idols (1943)
- Fever (1943)
- Traces of Light (1943)
- Ramona (1946)
- Everybody's Woman (1946)
- Don Quixote (1947)
- Bel Ami (1947)
- Beau Ideal (1948)
- Among Lawyers I See You (1951)
- My Husband (1951)
- My Adorable Savage (1952)
- Condemned to Hang (1953)
- Sighs of Triana (1955)
- ‘’Marcelino Pan y Vino’’ (1955)
- Afternoon of the Bulls (1956)
- Uncle Hyacynth (1956)
- Miracles of Thursday (1957)
- Ten Ready Rifles (1959)
- For Men Only (1960)

== Bibliography ==
- D'Lugo, Marvin. Guide to the Cinema of Spain. Greenwood Publishing, 1997.
- Goble, Alan. The Complete Index to Literary Sources in Film. Walter de Gruyter, 1999.
- Mira, Alberto. The Cinema of Spain and Portugal. Wallflower Press, 2005.
