= Bella the Savage =

1953 film

- Directed by: Raúl Medina; Roberto Rey
- Written by: María Julia Casanova; Enrique Suárez de Deza (play)
- Starring: Rita Montaner
- Cinematography: Miguel Fernández Mila
- Edited by: Mercedes Alonso; Pepita Orduna
- Music by: Augusto Algueró; Daniel Montorio
- Production companies: Hispamer Films; Producciones Salvador Behar
- Distributed by: Balart
- Release date: 27 April 1953
- Running time: 89 minutes
- Countries: Cuba; Spain
- Language: Spanish

Bella the Savage (Spanish: Bella, la salvaje) is a 1953 Cuban-Spanish musical comedy film directed by Raúl Medina and Roberto Rey and starring Blanquita Amaro and Néstor de Barbosa.

== Cast ==
- Blanquita Amaro
- Néstor de Barbosa
- Roberto Rey
- Silvia Morgan
- Luis Arroyo
- Pedro Tena
- Mario Moreno
- Carmen Porcel
- Justo M. Barreto
- Delia Luna
- Esperanza Roy
- Rosita Teide
- Aníbal Vela
- Eulalia Tenorio
- Celina
- Reutilio

== Bibliography ==
- Alfonso J. García Osuna. The Cuban Filmography: 1897 through 2001. McFarland, 2003.
