= Fog (1932 film) =

1932 film

- Directed by: Benito Perojo
- Written by: Henri-Georges Clouzot; Jacques de Baroncelli
- Cinematography: Louis Chaix; Henri Janvier
- Production company: Pathé Consortium Cinéma
- Release date: 18 April 1932
- Country: France
- Language: Spanish

Fog (Spanish: Niebla) is a 1932 French drama film directed by Benito Perojo. It was made as the Spanish-language version of the film The Last Blow.

== Cast ==
- Francisco Alarcon
- José Alcántara
- Pedro Elviro
- María Fernanda Ladrón de Guevara
- Rafael Rivelles
- José Rivero
- Pedro Valdivieso
- Ofelia Álvarez

== Bibliography ==
- D'Lugo, Marvin. Guide to the Cinema of Spain. Greenwood Publishing Group, 1997.
