= Mirror, Mirror (2022 film) =

- Theatrical release poster
- Spanish: Espejo, espejo
- Directed by: Marc Crehuet
- Written by: Marc Crehuet
- Produced by: Joaquín Padró; Mar Targarona
- Starring: Malena Alterio; Santi Millán; Natalia de Molina; Carlos Areces; Carlos Bardem; Betsy Túrnez; Toni Acosta; María Adánez; Verónica Forqué; Loles León; Tito Valverde
- Cinematography: Pol Orpinell
- Edited by: Elodie Leuthold
- Music by: Guillermo Martorell
- Production companies: Rodar y Rodar; Nos gusta el cine AIE
- Distributed by: Filmax
- Release dates: 21 April 2022 (BCN Film Fest); 20 May 2022 (Spain)
- Country: Spain
- Language: Spanish

Mirror, Mirror (Spanish: Espejo, espejo) is a 2022 Spanish comedy film directed and written by Marc Crehuet which stars Santi Millán, Malena Alterio, Carlos Areces and Natalia de Molina.

== Plot ==
The fiction follows four employees working for a cosmetics company who engage in conversations with their reflections on the mirror.

== Cast ==
- Santi Millán as Álvaro
- Natalia de Molina as Paula
- Malena Alterio as Cristina
- Carlos Areces as Alberto
- Betsy Túrnez as Antonia
- María Adánez
- Carlos Bardem
- Toni Acosta
- Loles León
- Tito Valverde
- Verónica Forqué as Álvaro's mother

== Production ==
The screenplay was written by the director Marc Crehuet. Produced by Rodar y Rodar and Nos gusta el cine AIE, with the participation of RTVE, TV3 and Netflix, shooting began on 10 August 2020 and wrapped by September 2020. Shooting locations included Pamplona and Barcelona.

== Release ==
The film premiered as the opening film of the 6th BCN Film Fest on 21 April 2022. Distributed by Filmax, it was theatrically released in Spain on 20 May 2022.

== See also ==
- List of Spanish films of 2022
