= The Rascal of Madrid =

1926 film

- Directed by: Florián Rey
- Written by: Florián Rey
- Cinematography: Carlos Pahissa
- Production company: Florián Rey P.C.
- Release date: 1926
- Country: Spain
- Languages: Silent; Spanish intertitles

The Rascal of Madrid (Spanish:El pilluelo de Madrid) is a 1926 Spanish silent film directed by Florián Rey.

== Cast ==
- Guillermo Figueras
- Alfredo Hurtado
- Pedro Larrañaga
- Manuel Montenegro
- Ricardo Núñez
- Ricardo Piroto
- Flora Rossini
- Elisa Ruiz Romero

== Bibliography ==
- Hortelano, Lorenzo J. Torres. World Film Locations: Madrid. Intellect Books, 2012.
