= Outstanding (film) =

- Directed by: Luis Ligero
- Written by: Antonio Guzmán Merino; Luis Ligero; Miguel Ligero
- Starring: Miguel Ligero; Rosita Yarza
- Cinematography: José F. Aguayo
- Edited by: Isidro Velilla
- Music by: Manuel Gracia
- Production company: Valencia Films
- Distributed by: CEPICSA
- Release date: 2 February 1953
- Running time: 90 minutes
- Country: Spain
- Language: Spanish

Outstanding (Spanish: Sobresaliente) is a 1953 Spanish comedy film directed by Luis Ligero and starring Miguel Ligero and Rosita Yarza.

The film's sets were designed by Teddy Villalba.

== Synopsis ==
Juanito puts at risk the happiness of his younger brother Ricardo, whom he cares for as if he were his father.

== Cast ==
- Valeriano Andrés
- Manuel Arbó
- Rafael Arcos
- Ricardo B. Arévalo
- Pedro Pablo Ayuso
- Julián Balbuena
- Xan das Bolas
- Josefina Carreras
- Juan Cazalilla
- Manuel R. Cuevillas
- Juan Córdoba
- Mercedes Duval
- Alfonso Estela
- José Franco
- Victoria Herrera
- María Antonia Jiménez
- Arturo Calderón de la Barca
- Miguel Ligero
- Luis Lucas
- Manuel Luna hijo
- Juana Mansó
- José María Martín
- Pablo Muñiz
- Encarna Paso
- Blanca Pozas
- Inés Pérez Indarte
- Olimpia Raga as dance couple
- Vicente Raga as dance couple
- Alberto Romea
- Carlos Rufart
- Mary Serra
- Ana de Siria
- Alicia Torres
- José María Uribarri
- Aníbal Vela hijo
- Rosita Yarza

== Bibliography ==
- Mario Gallina. De Gardel a Norma Aleandro: diccionario sobre figuras del cine argentino en el exterior. Ediciones Corregidor, 1999.
