= Paloma Fair =

- Directed by: Benito Perojo
- Written by: Ricardo de la Vega; Pedro de Repide; Benito Perojo
- Starring: Miguel Ligero; Roberto Rey; Raquel Rodrigo; Sélica Pérez Carpio
- Cinematography: Fred Mandl
- Edited by: Henri Taverna
- Music by: Tomás Bretón (original music)
- Production company: CIFESA
- Distributed by: CIFESA
- Release date: 23 December 1935
- Running time: 78 minutes
- Country: Spain
- Language: Spanish

Paloma Fair (Spanish: La verbena de la Paloma) is a 1935 Spanish musical film directed by Benito Perojo and starring Miguel Ligero, Roberto Rey and Raquel Rodrigo. It is an adaptation of the 1894 Zarzuela La verbena de la Paloma and it is part of the tradition of Operetta films which was at its height during the 1930s. The film was made by Spain's largest studio of the era CIFESA, and was one of the most popular films made during the Second Spanish Republic.

== Cast ==
- Miguel Ligero as Don Hilarión
- Roberto Rey as Julián
- Raquel Rodrigo as Susana
- Sélica Pérez Carpio as Señá Rita
- Dolores Cortés as Tía Antonia
- Charito Leonís as Casta
- Rafael Calvo as El tabernero
- Enrique Salvador as Don Sebastián
- Carmen Guerra as La bailadora
- Isabel de Miguel as Cantadora
- Guillermo Linhoff as El novio
- Luis Llaneza as El inspector
- Alicia Palacios as La novia

== Bibliography ==
- D'Lugo, Marvin. Guide to the Cinema of Spain. Greenwood Publishing, 1997.
