= The Sin of Rogelia Sanchez =

- Directed by: Roberto de Ribón; Carlo Borghesio
- Written by: Alberto Moravia; Armando Palacio Valdés (novel); Roberto de Ribón; Mario Soldati
- Starring: Germaine Montero; Rafael Rivelles; Juan de Landa
- Cinematography: Francesco Izzarelli; Jan Stallich; Augusto Tiezzi
- Edited by: Mario Bonotti
- Music by: Federico Moreno Torroba; Giovanni Fusco
- Production company: SAFIC
- Distributed by: ENIC
- Release date: 6 January 1940
- Running time: 83 minutes
- Country: Italy
- Language: Italian

The Sin of Rogelia Sanchez (Italian: Il peccato di Rogelia Sanchez) is a 1940 Italian drama film directed by Carlo Borghesio and Roberto de Ribón and starring Germaine Montero, Juan de Landa and Rafael Rivelles.

It was made at Cinecitta as part of an Italian-Spanish film agreement, with a separate Spanish-language version Saint Rogelia also been produced. It was based on a 1926 novel by Armando Palacio Valdés. The film's sets were designed by Guido Fiorini.

== Cast ==
- Germaine Montero as Rogelia Sanchez
- Juan de Landa as Massimo, suo marito
- Rafael Rivelles as Don Fernando
- Letizia Bonini as Cristina
- Pina Renzi as La patronessa
- Mario Brizzolari as Il dottor Oliver
- Felice Minotti as Pepe, un minatore
- Julia Caba Alba as L'ostessa
- Bacot as Il minatore ubriaco
- Guido Stani as Pericho
- Pastora Peña as Mariana
- Vasco Creti as Un medico
- Maria Bruna Marcati as Grazia
- Maria Polese as Adele
- Mario Condorelli as Il curato
- Margherita Bossi as La padrona del ristorante
- Francesco Ferrara as Un detenuto
- Mimí Muñoz as La figlioletta di Rogelia
- Luis Peña padre
- Franca Volpini
- Alba Ferrarotti
- Bianca Aurora

== Bibliography ==
- Philip Balma. Edith Bruck in the Mirror: Fictional Transitions and Cinematic Narratives. Purdue University Press, 2014.
