= Casimir (film) =

- Directed by: Richard Pottier
- Written by: Gérard Carlier; Jean Manse
- Produced by: Roger Ribadeau-Dumas
- Starring: Fernandel; Germaine Montero; Bernard La Jarrige
- Cinematography: André Germain
- Edited by: Monique Isnardon; Robert Isnardon
- Music by: Joe Hajos
- Production companies: La Société Française de Cinematographie; La Société des Films Sirius
- Distributed by: La Société des Films Sirius
- Release date: 7 April 1950
- Running time: 87 minutes
- Country: France
- Language: French

Casimir is a 1950 French comedy film directed by Richard Pottier and starring Fernandel, Germaine Montero and Bernard La Jarrige. It was shot at the Neuilly Studios in Paris. The film's sets were designed by the art director Paul-Louis Boutié.

== Synopsis ==
Casimir is a vacuum cleaner salesman, who through a misunderstanding attracts the romantic attentions of a wealthy client Angelita. Eventually he arranges her pairing with Paul-André, while he secures a large order and is free to marry his own fiancée Denise.

== Cast ==
- Fernandel as Casimir
- Germaine Montero as Angelita Garcia y Gonzalez
- Bernard La Jarrige as Paul-André, un peintre
- Jacqueline Duc as Denise
- Gaston Orbal as Poiret
- André Numès Fils as L'huissier dela Société Prima
- Cécile Didier as La gouvernante du docteur
- Robert Seller as Dr. Labrousse
- Lucien Hector as Le cafetier
- Charles Fawcett as Mr. Brown, le PDG de Prima
- Darling Légitimus as Caroline
- Julien Maffre as Le cireur
- Émile Riandreys as Le grippé
- Alfred Arlais as Le pédicure
- Edmond Méry as Le locataire nain
- Pierre Ferval as Le névrosé dans la salle s'attente
- Marc Arian as Collaborateur participant à la réunion de travail
- Delcassan as La vieille locataire au sonotone

== Bibliography ==
- Jacques Lorcey. Fernandel. Éditions Ramsay, 1990.
