= The Songstress (film) =

- Directed by: Benito Perojo
- Written by: Armando Palacio Valdés (novel); Pascual Guillén
- Produced by: Ricardo Núñez
- Starring: Imperio Argentina; Amadeo Novoa
- Cinematography: Antonio Merayo
- Edited by: Jorge Gárate
- Music by: Guillermo Cases
- Production company: Argentina Sono Film
- Release date: 5 July 1946
- Running time: 76 minutes
- Country: Argentina
- Language: Spanish

The Songstress (Spanish: La maja de los cantares) is a 1946 Argentine musical comedy film of the classical era of Argentine cinema, directed by Benito Perojo and starring Imperio Argentina and Amadeo Novoa. It is based on a novel by Armando Palacio Valdés. It is set in Andalusia.

== Cast ==
- Imperio Argentina
- Vicente Ariño
- Andrés Barreta hijo
- Gema Castillo
- María del Pilar
- Mario Gabarrón
- Laberinto y Terremoto
- Amadeo Novoa
- María Luisa Ortiz
- Enrique San Miguel
- Conchita Soto
- Carmelita Vázquez

== Bibliography ==
- Cecilia Cavanagh. La búsqueda de la nostalgia: afiches cinematográficos argentinos, 1934-1964. Pontificia Universidad Católica Argentina, Pabellón de las Bellas Artes, 2006.
