= Don Quixote (1947 film) =

1947 Spanish film by Rafael Gil

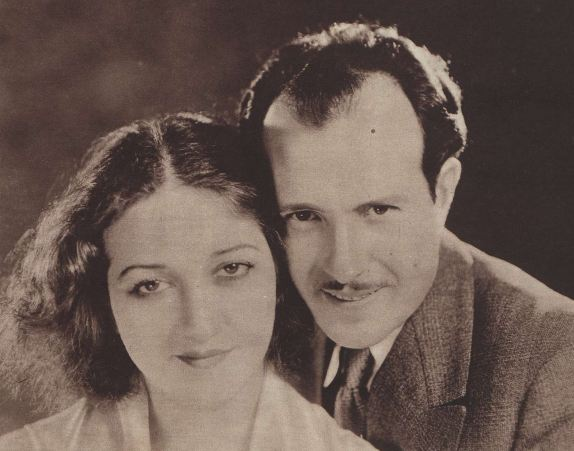
- Spanish actors María Fernanda Ladrón de Guevara and Rafael Rivelles
- Directed by: Rafael Gil
- Screenplay by: Rafael Gil
- Story by: Miguel de Cervantes Saavedra
- Based on: Don Quixote by Miguel de Cervantes
- Produced by: Juan Manuel de Rada
- Starring: Rafael Rivelles; Juan Calvo; Fernando Rey; Sara Montiel
- Cinematography: Alfredo Fraile
- Edited by: Juan Serra
- Music by: Ernesto Halffter
- Production company: CIFESA
- Distributed by: CIFESA
- Release date: 2 March 1948 (Spain)
- Running time: 137 minutes 107 minutes (U.S.)
- Country: Spain
- Language: Spanish
- Box office: ESP 769,579 (Spain)

Don Quixote or Don Quixote de la Mancha (Spanish: Don Quijote de la Mancha) is the first sound film version in Spanish of the novel by Miguel de Cervantes Saavedra. It was directed and adapted by Rafael Gil and released in 1947. A huge undertaking for Spanish cinema in its day, it was the longest film version of the novel up to that time (two hours and twelve minutes, plus an intermission), and very likely the most faithful, reverently following the book in its dialogue and order of episodes, unlike G.W. Pabst's 1933 version and the later Russian film version, which scrambled up the order of the adventures as many film versions do. Characters such as Cardenio, Dorotea, and Don Fernando, which are usually omitted because their respective subplots have little to do with the main body of the novel, were kept in this film.

The film, which starred Rafael Rivelles as Don Quixote and Juan Calvo as Sancho Panza, featured a young Fernando Rey as Sanson Carrasco and popular Spanish actress Sara Montiel as Antonia, Quixote's niece. The music for the film was composed by Ernesto Halffter, and the movie was shot on location in La Mancha and other Spanish regions.

It did not fare as well in the United States, where it opened in 1949, as it had in Spain. In its American runs, it was whittled down to a more customary length of 107 minutes.

== Plot ==
The film is one of the most reliable versions of the work of Cervantes, and as in it, it narrates the adventures of Alonso Quijano, a gentleman from La Mancha who, after reading chivalric books over and over again, believes himself to be a gentleman. That is why he begins a trip to order to find a path full of adventures. Disobeying his local priest and barber, he begins his journey, naming Sancho Panza as his squire.

Alonso decides to take the name of Don Quixote de la Mancha for his exploits, however along the way he wanders several times, mistaking mills for giants and flocks of sheep for armies about to engage in a fight. After freeing some prisoners almost by accident, he decides to stay exiled in the mountains to pay for his actions, but then between Sancho Panza, the priest and the barber, they manage to bring him back home in a wooden cell.

His misadventures will be collected in a book that will soon spread throughout Spain, because of that many will already know his name, but not because of his fame, but because of the madness that lives in the mind of Don Quixote de la Mancha who believes he is a gentleman walking in an age where they no longer exist. Encouraged by the bachelor Sansón Carrasco, he will make a second outing in which many people, recognizing him, will begin to make fun of him and play with his madness. Sansón Carrasco will try to make him return home by disguising himself as a knight to defeat him in a duel, however he will lose and will try again some time later, succeeding in his mission and getting Don Quixote, dejected by defeat, to return home to spend a year without undertaking any feat. The physical and mental pain will take Don Quixote to his last days, dying in the end sheltered by his friends and his family.

== Bibliography ==
- Mira, Alberto (28 April 2010). Historical Dictionary of Spanish Cinema. Scarecrow Press. ISBN 978-0-8108-7375-9.
