= Henry Trévoux =

French stage and film actor

Henry Trévoux or Henri Trévoux, real name Henri Maurice Séraphin Mathieu, (31 March 1880, Grenoble – 16 July 1943, Paris) was a French stage and film actor.

== Filmography ==
- 1929: C'est par amour pour vous Madame by Henry Lepage (short film)
- 1931: Un homme en habit de René Guissart
- 1932: Mon cœur balance by René Guissart
- 1932: The Last Blow by Jacques de Baroncelli as Frémiet
- 1932: Le Crime du Bouif by André Berthomieu : Le commissaire
- 1932: Bariole by Benno Vigny
- 1932: To the Polls, Citizens by Jean Hémard
- 1933: Noces et banquets by Roger Capellani (short film)
- 1933: Mademoiselle Josette, ma femme by André Berthomieu : the director
- 1933: Plein aux as by Jacques Houssin : Le Dattier
- 1933: Pour être aimé by Jacques Tourneur
- 1933: The Tunnel by Kurt Bernhardt
- 1934: Le Secret d'une nuit by Félix Gandera : the assistant
- 1935: Jim la Houlette de André Berthomieu : the publisher
- 1935: Odette by Jacques Houssin : Béchamel
- 1937: Le Fauteuil 47 by Fernand Rivers : Trémois
- 1938: Prince de mon cœur by Jacques Daniel-Norman
- 1938: La Présidente by Fernand Rivers
- 1938: La Goualeuse by Fernand Rivers : Un inspecteur
- 1943: Vautrin de Pierre Billon

== Theatre ==
- 1906: Mademoiselle Josette, ma femme by Robert Charvay and Paul Gavault, Théâtre du Gymnase
- 1909: Le Scandale by Henry Bataille, Théâtre de la Renaissance
- 1909: La Petite Chocolatière by Paul Gavault, Théâtre de la Renaissance
- 1927: Désiré by Sacha Guitry, Théâtre Édouard VII
