= Cyrano and d'Artagnan =

1964 film

- Theatrical release poster
- Directed by: Abel Gance
- Screenplay by: Abel Gance
- Produced by: Armand Becué
- Cinematography: Raymond Picon-Borel
- Edited by: Eraldo Da Roma; Abel Gance; Nelly Kaplan
- Music by: Michel Magne
- Release dates: 25 September 1964 (NYFF); 22 October 1964
- Running time: 145 minutes
- Country: France
- Language: French

Cyrano and d'Artagnan (French: Cyrano et d'Artagnan) is a 1964 French adventure film directed by Abel Gance, starring José Ferrer and Jean-Pierre Cassel. It is set in 1642 and tells the story of how the poet and duelist Cyrano de Bergerac teams up with the musketeer d'Artagnan in order to stop a plot against king Louis XIII. The film draws from Edmond Rostand's 1897 play Cyrano de Bergerac and Alexandre Dumas' three-volume novel d'Artagnan Romances. Ferrer repeated his role from the 1950 film Cyrano de Bergerac. Cyrano and d'Artagnan had 651,213 admissions in France.

It was the last cinema film directed by Gance, his final works the television films Marie Tudor and Valmy.

== Cast ==
- José Ferrer as Cyrano de Bergerac
- Jean-Pierre Cassel as d'Artagnan
- Sylva Koscina as Ninon de l'Eclos
- Daliah Lavi as Marion de l'Orme
- Rafael Rivelles as Cardinal Duc de Richelieu
- Laura Valenzuela as queen Anne of Austria
- Julián Mateos as Marquis de Cinq-Mars
- Michel Simon as the old guard
- Philippe Noiret as King Louis XIII
- Gabrielle Dorziat as Mme de Mauvières
- Ivo Garrani as Laubardemont

== Reception ==
Eugene Archer of The New York Times reviewed the film: "Judging strictly by the title, Cyrano and D'Artagnan does not sound a bit more promising than Samson Meets Hercules. Strange to say, despite the auspices of the New York Film Festival and the reputation of the 75-year-old director, Abel Gance, there is really not much difference between the Cyrano epic and the kind of dubbed Italian spectacle usually inflicted on us by Joseph E. Levine." The critic continued: "José Ferrer, repeating his Oscar-winning Cyrano role 14 years later, gives a flat and clumsy performance, while Jean-Pierre Cassel's D'Artagnan is swaggering and singularly lacking in charm. ... Let it be said for the director, known mainly for a silent triple-screen Napoleon in the nineteen-twenties, that he displays a nice eye for color. Otherwise, his handling of a routine commercial assignment is just that—routine."
