= Pedro de Répide =

Spanish writer (1882–1948)

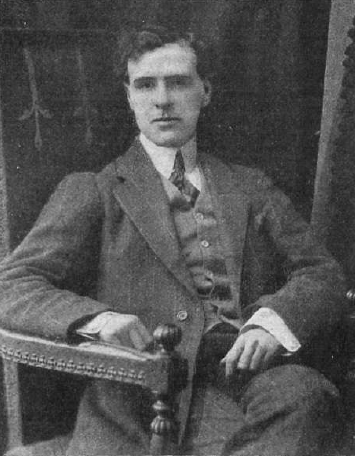
Pedro de Répide, c. 1913

Pedro de Répide Gallegos (8 February 1882 – 16 February 1948) was a Spanish writer and journalist based in Madrid.

== Biography ==
Pedro de Répide Gallegos studied law, philosophy and liberal arts at the Complutense University of Madrid, and by the age of nineteen had already published a book of verse, Las Canciones (The Songs).

In Paris, he continued his studies at the Sorbonne and was director of the library of Isabella II of Spain. In 1904, at the death of Isabella II, he returned to Madrid and became a journalist.

He was one of the founding members of La Libertad, and editor of El Liberal and a contributor to, among others, Blanco y Negro, La Esfera, Nuevo Mundo, El Cuento Semanal, Los Contemporàneos, La Novela de Hoy, El Libro Popular and La Novela Corta.

The City Council of Madrid appointed him as official feature writer for the city.

He spent eleven years in America.

== Works ==
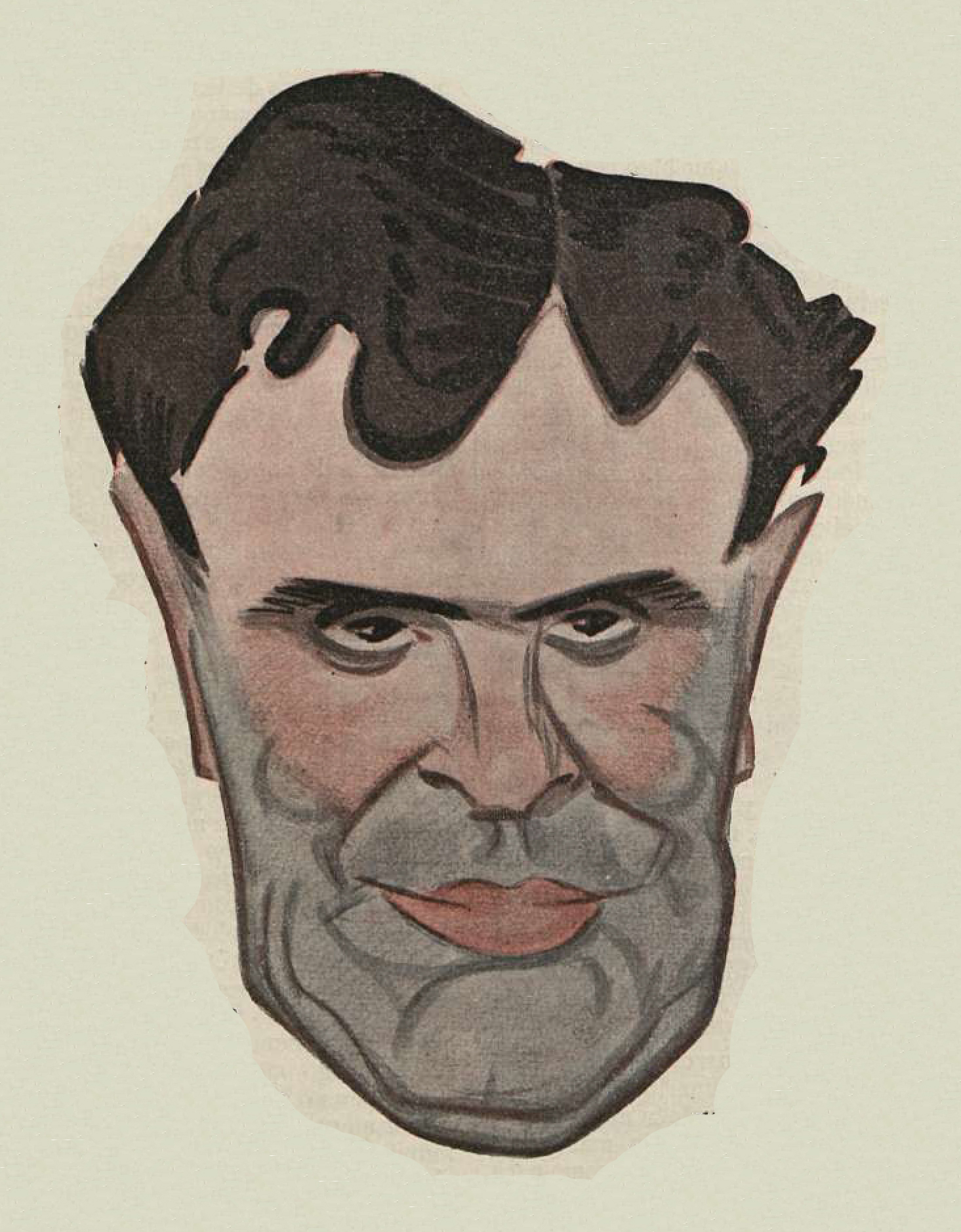
Pedro de Répide by Tovar (1922)

Pedro de Répide Gallegos's true passion was chronicling contemporary life in Madrid (see costumbrismo). He scarcely wrote of anything else, save one biography, Isabel II, reina de España (Isabel II, Queen of Spain), which in reality served as a pretext to describe the celebrations, ceremonies and rincones ("corners") of Madrid. Much of his work was first published in varied newspapers (such as La Libertad) and magazines.

=== Novels ===
- Las calles de Madrid (The Streets of Madrid)
- Costumbres y devociones madrileñas (Habits of the People of Madrid)
- Del Rastro a Maravillas (From el Rastro to Wonders)
- Chamberí por Fuencarral (Chamberí by Fuencarral)
- El Madrid de los abuelos (The Madrid of our Grandparents)
- Isabel II
- Alfonso XII
- Del Mar Negro al Caribe (The Black Sea to the Caribbean)
- La Rusia de ahora (Russa, Now)
- El Solar de la bolera
- Noche perdida (Lost Night)
- Cuento de viejas (Travel Tales)
- Los cohetes de la verbena (The Fireworks of the Festival)
- El maleficio de la U (The Curse of the U)
- El agua en el cestillo
- No hay fuerza contra el amor (You Can't Fight love)
- Cartas de azafatas (Letters from Airhostesses)
- La enamorada indiscreta (The Indiscreet Affair)
- Un conspirador de ayer (A conspirator of yesterday)
- La negra (The Negro Lady)
- Los pícaros de Amaniel
- La torre sin puerta (The Tower Without a Door)
- Del rancio solar
- Los espejos de Clío (The Mirrors of Clío)
- Jardín de princesas (Garden of Princesses)
- La llave de Araceli (The Key of Araceli)
- La desazón de las Angustias (Anguish of the Anguished)

=== Poetry ===
- Las Canciones (The Songs)
- Estampas grotescas (Grotesque Illustrations)

=== Films ===
- Paloma Fair (1935)
