= The Last Blow =

1932 film

- Directed by: Jacques de Baroncelli
- Written by: Henri-Georges Clouzot; Jacques de Baroncelli
- Starring: Jean Murat; Danièle Parola; Robert Ancelin
- Cinematography: Louis Chaix; Henri Janvier
- Music by: Mauricio Roget
- Production company: Les Films Osso
- Distributed by: Pathé Consortium Cinéma
- Release date: 13 May 1932
- Running time: 77 minutes
- Country: France
- Language: French

The Last Blow (French: Le dernier choc) is a 1932 French drama film directed by Jacques de Baroncelli and starring Jean Murat, Danièle Parola and Robert Ancelin. A separate Spanish-language version Fog was also made.

== Synopsis ==
The captain of a cargo ship suspects his wife of having an affair with a childhood friend of his. His wife embanks on the ship with this friend, and her sister, during a heavy mist. Confusion and tragedy follow.

== Cast ==
- Jean Murat as Captain Colbec
- Danièle Parola as Marie
- Robert Ancelin as Lucien
- Nicolas Redelsperger as Guénot
- Vanah Yami as Arlette
- Henry Trévoux as Frémiet
- Raymond Narlay as Ménard
- Alexandre Arnaudy as Vachot

== Bibliography ==
- Crisp, Colin. Genre, Myth and Convention in the French Cinema, 1929-1939. Indiana University Press, 2002.
