= World Crisis =

- Directed by: Benito Perojo
- Written by: Tomás García Camellin; Mauricio Torres
- Starring: Antoñita Colomé; Miguel Ligero; Ricardo Nunez; Alfonso Tudela
- Cinematography: Tamás Keményffy; Fred Mandel
- Music by: Jean Gilbert
- Production company: Atlantic Films
- Release date: 1934
- Country: Spain
- Language: Spanish

World Crisis (Spanish:Crisis mundial) is a 1934 Spanish romantic comedy film directed by Benito Perojo and starring Antoñita Colomé, Miguel Ligero and Ricardo Nunez. The film is set mostly in a Swiss luxury hotel in the wake of the Wall Street crash. It was a box office success, but is now considered a lost film.

== Cast ==
- Antoñita Colomé as Mery
- Miguel Ligero as Pololo
- Ricardo Núñez as Julio Lonaty
- José María Linares-Rivas as Herbert Parker
- Alfonso Tudela as Ferdinando Martini Martinelli
- Laly Cadierno as Vampiresa
- Carlos del Pozo as Gerente del hotel
- Blanca Pozas
- Nicolás D. Perchicot
- Pedro Chicote as Barman
- Francisco Zabala
- Fernando Freyre de Andrade
- Ricardo Muñoz
- Pastora Peña
- Luchy Soto

== Bibliography ==
- Bentley, Bernard. A Companion to Spanish Cinema. Boydell & Brewer 2008.
