= Roberto Rey =

Chilean actor

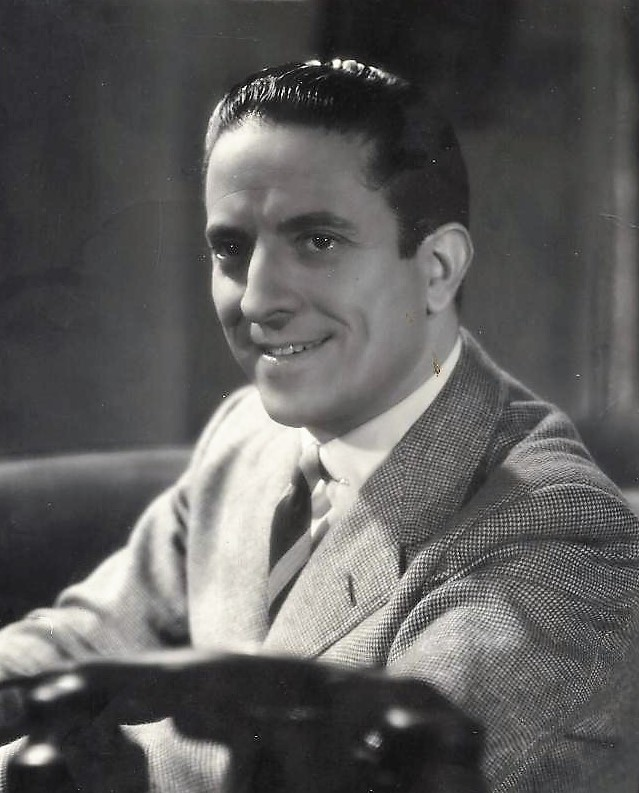
- Born: 15 February 1905; Valparaíso, Chile
- Died: 30 May 1972 (aged 67); Madrid, Spain
- Occupation: Actor
- Years active: 1935-1970 (film)

Roberto Rey (15 February 1905 – 30 May 1972) was a Spanish film actor. Born in Chile to Spanish parents, he appeared in more than fifty films in Spain during his career, including the 1935 musical Paloma Fair.

== Selected filmography ==
- A Lucky Man (1930)
- A Gentleman in Tails (1931)
- Transit Camp (1932)
- Paloma Fair (1935)
- The Dancer and the Worker (1936)
- The Barber of Seville (1938)
- It Always Ends That Way (1939)
- Sighs of Spain (1939)
- A Palace for Sale (1942)
- The Princess of the Ursines (1947)
- Bella the Savage (1953)
- They Fired with Their Lives (1959)
- Litri and His Shadow (1960)
- A Girl from Chicago (1960)
- The Daughters of Helena (1963)
- Gunfighters of Casa Grande (1964)
- Aragonese Nobility (1965)
- The Complete Idiot (1970)

== Bibliography ==
- D'Lugo, Marvin. Guide to the Cinema of Spain. Greenwood Publishing, 1997.
