= Antonio Álamo =

Spanish Writer (born 1964)

- Born: November 3, 1964 (age 61); Córdoba, Spain
- Occupations: Writer, playwright

Antonio Álamo (Córdoba, 3 November 1964) is a Spanish writer. He has developed an extensive body of work that includes novels, short stories, travel writing and plays. In July 2004, he was appointed director of the Teatro Lope de Vega in Seville.

== Biography ==
Born in Córdoba (Spain) in 1964, he soon moved with his parents to Madrid. At the age of 17, he settled in Seville. He graduated in law from the University of Seville and from a young age showed an interest in theatre, becoming both a playwright and a director.

== Career ==
Author of a number of sharp-witted comedies, Álamo has written around a dozen plays since 1991, among them the trilogy made up of Los borrachos (1993), Los enfermos and Yo, Satán. In 2006, he collaborated on the staging of El príncipe tirano by the Renaissance writer Juan de la Cueva for the Centro Andaluz de Teatro in Seville. Directed by Pepa Gamboa, this plot about greed, ambition and the contradictions of human nature was reworked by Álamo from two original texts, La comedia del príncipe tirano and La tragedia del príncipe tirano.

Co-director of the theatre company El Traje de Artaud, he has worked as assistant director to Alfonso Zurro and Jesús Cracio. With his play Veinticinco años menos un día, written in 2005, and premiered on 17 September 2011 at the Teatro Español in Madrid, he set out to pay tribute to English theatre.

In 2007, he wrote Cantando bajo las balas, an impossible dialogue between Millán Astray and Miguel de Unamuno.

In 2009, he wrote, together with Juan Carlos Rubio, the play La ciudad de todos los tiempos, based on texts by Borges and music from One Thousand and One Nights, a project with which the city of Córdoba supported its bid to become the 2016 European Capital of Culture.

In 2012, he wrote La copla negra, a play set in Cádiz, "the south of the south", whose protagonists are a group of chirigoteros (Carnival song performers). It premiered in Córdoba on 22 March 2013.

In October 2015, he premiered Juanita Calamidad, a decidedly dark comedy that, in the author's words, is:

"a kind of anti-Yerma: a schoolteacher reluctant to motherhood and to anything that involves commitment".

The premiere took place at the Teatro Palacio Valdés in Avilés with the following principal cast: Ana López Segovia (Juanita Calamidad), Teresa Quintero and Alejandra López Segovia.

== Style and theatricality ==
Álamo is associated with the so-called "dramaturgy of the millennium", a generation of playwrights influenced by the avant-gardes, Samuel Beckett and Fernando Arrabal, which has grown up around the Marqués de Bradomín Prize.

This generation includes the Asturian writers Maxi Rodríguez, José Busto, David Desola and Borja Ortiz, among others.

Positioned on the threshold of the digital age, they draw on the Spanish dramatic tradition (such as José Luis Alonso de Santos or Fermín Cabal) but see their work as incomplete without a strong narrative backbone. In Álamo's own words, he feels "the need for a world with fiction".

== Awards ==
Some of Antonio Álamo awards include:

- 1991 – Marqués de Bradomín Prize for La oreja izquierda de Van Gogh.
- 1993 – Tirso de Molina Prize for Los borrachos.
- 1993 – Ciudad de Alcorcón Prize for Los borrachos.
- 1996 – Editorial Lengua de Trapo Novel Prize for Breve historia de la inmortalidad.
- 1996 – Borne Theatre Prize for Los enfermos.
- 1996 – Ercilla Prize for Best Production of the Year for Los borrachos.
- 1996 – Palencia Theatre Prize for Pasos.
- 2000 – Caja de España Prize for Grande como una tumba.
- 2004 – Premio Jaén de Novela for El incendio del paraíso.
- 2004 – "Cordobés del Año" (Cordovan of the Year), awarded by the Asociación Cultural Al-Ándalus of Palma del Río.
- 2005 – Borne Theatre Prize for Veinticinco años menos un día.
- 2006 – Chivas Telón Prize for Best New Play for Yo, Satán.
- 2007 – Yo, Satán received the awards for Best Production, Best Direction (Juan José Martín) and Best Supporting Actor (William Guite) at the Municipal Theatre Awards of Caracas.
- 2007 – Jury Prize for Best Show at the Mostra Internacional de Teatro de Rivadavia for Cantando bajo las balas.
- 2007 – Chivas Telón Prize for Best Play of the Year for Cantando bajo las balas.
- 2010 – World Theatre Day Prize, awarded by the Diputación de Sevilla.
- 2017 – Premio Córdoba an Escena, awarded by the ESAD and the Diputación de Córdoba.
- 2017 – Premio Lorca for stage adaptation for El pintor de batallas.
- 2017 – Teatro Rojas Prize for Best New Play for El pintor de batallas.
- 2020 – XXI SGAE Children's Theatre Prize for La increíble historia de la caca mutante.
- 2023 – Premio Lorca for playwriting (Autoría Teatral) for Sí, a todo.

== Works ==
=== Novels ===
Álamo published Breve historia de la inmortalidad (Lengua de Trapo Narrative Prize 1996, published by Lengua de Trapo) and has contributed short stories to the collections Páginas amarillas (Lengua de Trapo, 1998) and Daños colaterales (Lengua de Trapo, 2002). In 1998 he published his second novel, Una buena idea, with Planeta, in which he uses the voice of a child to criticise literary solemnity.

The following year saw the appearance of ¿Quién se ha meado en mi cama? (Lengua de Trapo, 1999). He has also published a collection of short stories, Los perros y los gatos. His novel Nata soy (2001) later served as the basis for his play Yo, Satán. In 2004 his novel El incendio del paraíso was published by Mondadori.

== Bibliography ==
=== Fiction ===
- Los gatos o los perros, followed by La oreja izquierda de Van Gogh, Ed. Mágico Íntimo, no. 8, Seville, 1986.
- Breve historia de la inmortalidad, Ed. Lengua de Trapo, no. 11, Madrid, November 1996.
- Una buena idea, Ed. Planeta, Barcelona, 1998.
- ¿Quién se ha meado en mi cama?, Ed. Lengua de Trapo, no. 38, Madrid, 1999.
- Nata soy, Ed. Random House Mondadori, Barcelona, September 2001, February 2002, November 2003, and June 2005.
- Una buena idea, Ed. Random House Mondadori, Debolsillo 21, Barcelona, January 2004.
- El incendio del paraíso, Ed. Random House Mondadori, Barcelona, November 2004.

=== Short stories in anthologies ===
- "No me digan que no", in the volume Páginas amarillas, Ed. Lengua de Trapo, Madrid, November 1997.
- "Besos para mi mujer", Extramundi y los Papeles de Iria Flavia, Summer 1988.
- "El principio de la continuación", in 27 narradores cordobeses, Ed. Centro Cultural Generación del 27, Área de Cultura de la Diputación de Málaga, Málaga, 1999.
- "Héctor", Ed. Comité Ciudadano Antisida de Sevilla, 1999.
- "Véronique", in Lo del amor es un cuento, Ed. Ópera Prima, Madrid, 1999.
- "Maletas vacías", in Cuento al Sur (1980–2000), Ed. Batarro, ed. Pedro M. Domene, Málaga, 2001.
- "Justicia infinita", in Cuentos eróticos de verano, Ed. Tusquets, Barcelona, 2002.
- "Morir lo más lejos posible", in Daños colaterales. Hazañas antibélicas, Ed. Lengua de Trapo, Madrid, 2002.
- "Todo el mundo tiene amigos raros", in Tragedias de Shakespeare, Ed. 451, Madrid, 2007.

=== Travel books ===
- Lo que cuentan los viajeros, Ed. Plaza & Janés, Barcelona, 1998.

=== Theatre ===
- La oreja izquierda de Van Gogh, (Marqués de Bradomín Prize 1991), Instituto de la Juventud, "Premio Marqués de Bradomín" collection, Madrid, 1992.
- Pasos (Palencia Prize 1996), Ed. Asociación de Autores de Teatro, Madrid, 1997.
- Los enfermos (Borne Prize 1997), Ed. Bitzoc, Palma de Mallorca, 1997.
- Los borrachos, Ed. Ayuntamiento de Alcorcón, 1994. Theatre Prize, XIII National Competition "Ciudad de Alcorcón".
- Caos, Ed. SGAE, Madrid, 2001.
- Grande como una tumba (Caja de España Prize 2000), Ed. Caja de España, Valladolid, 2001.
- El punto, Ed. Asociación de Autores de Teatro, Madrid, 2003.
- Veinticinco años menos un día (XXX Premio Born 2005), Primer Acto, no. 312, Madrid, 2006.
- Yo, Satán, Ed. UNAM, Mexico City, 2006, in an anthology of six contemporary playwrights.
- Johnny cogió su fusil, stage adaptation of Dalton Trumbo's novel, in collaboration with Jesús Cracio, Primer Acto no. 316, Madrid, 2006.
- Cantando bajo las balas, Ed. Ñaque, Ciudad Real, 2007.
- Veinticinco años menos un día, Arola Editors, Barcelona, 2007.
- En un lugar de la niebla, Ed. Instituto Cervantes, October 2011.
- Patadas, Ed. SGAE, Madrid, 2011.

=== Short theatre ===
- "La camarera del Sófloque’s", in the magazine El siglo que viene, Seville, July 1996.
- "El hombre que quería volar (pero no tenía un buen maestro)", in Teatro de la España demócrata: los noventa, Ed. Fundamentos, Madrid, 1996, edited by Candyce Leonard and John P. Gabriele.
- "Entre el cielo y la tierra se borraron los confines", Associació per la Fundació Escena, Barcelona, 1999, in the short-play show Sopa de radio.
- "Morir lo más lejos posible", bilingual Spanish–Arabic edition, Ed. Fundación El Legado Andalusí, in Cuento de las dos orillas, Granada, 2001.
- "Confesión", in La confesión, Ed. Asociación de Autores de Teatro, Madrid, 2001, for a production by Walter Manfré.
- "Cazando a Velázquez", Revista Sibila, Seville, October 2002.
- "Espaguetis", in Maratón de Monólogos 2002, Ed. Asociación de Autores de Teatro, Madrid, 2002.
- 11 piezas al azar, collecting the following works: "El premio", "Entre el cielo y la tierra se borraron los confines", "Grande como una tumba", "La camarera del Sófloque’s", "La última vez", "Mendigos", "Morir lo más lejos posible", "Muriendo" and "Una luz que ya no está", Ed. Avispa, Madrid, 2002.
- Vidas y ficciones de la Ciudad de Salamanca, gathering the following dramaturgies and texts: "Donde hay escalas, hay tropiezos", "La Guerra de los Bandos", "Cielo e infierno" and "Las lecciones del hambre", Ed. Consorcio de Salamanca, 2002.
- "Dos exiliados", in Exilios. 18 obras de teatro de autores argentinos, españoles y mexicanos, Ed. Biblos, Buenos Aires, 2003.
- "Dos exiliados", in Teatro breve andaluz, Ed. Consejería de Cultura de la Junta de Andalucía, 2005.
- "Mendigos (pieza para tres payasos)", in Exclusión. 18 obras de teatro de autores argentinos, españoles y mexicanos, Ed. Sierpe, Mexico, 2012.
- "El mejor plan es el caos", in La soledad es el hogar del monstruo, Imagine Ediciones, Madrid, 2013.

=== Theatre in translation ===
- The Drunkers (2000), English translation of Los borrachos by Tony Baring.
- Chaos (2001), English translation of Caos by Peter A. Muckley.
- "Morir lo más lejos posible", bilingual Spanish–Arabic edition, Ed. Fundación El Legado Andalusí, in Cuento de las dos orillas, Granada, 2001.
- La Vallée de l’ivresse (2002), French translation of Los borrachos by Christine Gagnieux, Les Solitaires Intempestifs.
- Passi (2004), Italian translation of Pasos by Emiliano Coco, in Teatro spagnolo contemporaneo, Edizioni dell’Orso, Rome, 2004.
- Bolnavii, Romanian translation of Los enfermos by Ioana Anghel, in Teatru spaniol contemporan, Fundația Culturală Camil Petrescu, Revista Teatrală azi, Bucharest, 2005.
- Vint-i-cinc anys menys un dia, Catalan translation of Veinticinco años menos un día by Lurdes Malgrat, Primer Acto, Madrid, 2006.
- Los enfermos, Russian translation by Evgeny Shtorn in the journal Hawe, no. 9, 2012.
- Els malalts, Catalan translation of Los enfermos by Damià Borràs.
- Les Malades, French translation of Los enfermos by Cristina Vinuesa and Salwa Al Maïman.

=== Translations ===
- Blasted, by Sarah Kane. Published in the ADE (Asociación de Directores de Escena) journal, July 1999.

=== Theatre essays ===
- "Sillas", in the journal of the Asociación de Directores de Escena, Madrid, 1993.
- Elogio del pánico, Ed. Centro Andaluz de Teatro, Seville, 1996, in the volume from the I Jornadas de Autores Andaluces.
- "Ideas temblorosas sobre el tiempo y la tragedia", in Colofón, Bulletin of the International Federation of Libraries of the Campo Freudiano, January 1997, no. 16.
- "Bailando con los deseos", in the collective volume Caprichos, Ed. Consejería de Cultura de la Junta de Andalucía, Seville, 1998.
- "¿Dónde está el público?", Escuela Superior de Arte Dramático de Murcia, Murcia, 1998; also published in the magazine Imagen, no. 8, Caracas, February 1998.
- Prologue to La gata sobre el tejado de zinc caliente, by Tennessee Williams, Ed. El Mundo, 1999.
- En el principio era la máscara (annotated anthology of the dramatic texts of the Machado brothers and Juan de Mairena), Ed. Renacimiento, Seville, 2000.

=== Other publications ===
- Los borrachos (fragment, with commentary by Alfonso Zurro), in 35 monólogos para ejercicios, compiled by Alberto Miralles, Ed. Avispa, Madrid, 1999.
- "Los espejos de Velázquez" (second interlude, fragment), Ed. Academia de España en Roma, Rome, 1999.
- "Qué he hecho yo para publicar esto", in 20 escritores jóvenes para el siglo XXI, ed. Noemí Montetes Mairal, Ed. DVD, Barcelona, 1999.
- “Ráfagas”, text for a photographic exhibition by Agustín Hurtado, November 2008, Casa de la Provincia, Diputación de Sevilla.
- Dramaturgia española de hoy, by Fermín Cabal, series of interviews with contemporary authors, Ed. Autor, SGAE, 2009.

== Stage productions ==
=== Original works ===
- Agujeros, finalist for the Caja de España Prize 1992. Premiered at Sala Imperdible, Seville, by the company Atalaya.
- La oreja izquierda de Van Gogh, Marqués de Bradomín Prize 1991. Premiered at Sala Olimpia, Madrid, by Atalaya as part of the Contemporary Spanish Playwrights Showcase organised by CNNTE (1993).
- Los borrachos, premiered in Granada on 17 January 1996 at Teatro Alhambra, produced by the Centro Andaluz de Teatro and directed by Alfonso Zurro.
- Los espejos de Velázquez, premiered in Badajoz on 20 May 1999 at Teatro López de Ayala, produced by TNT and directed by Pepa Gamboa.
- Pasos, Teatro Romea, Murcia, 7 May 1999. Directed by Juan Pedro Campoy, produced by ESAD.
- Los enfermos, Teatro de La Abadía, 20 November 1999. Directed by Rosario Ruiz Rodgers, produced by La Abadía and the Madrid Autumn Festival.
- Caos, Puertollano, 27 April 2000. Directed by Eduardo Fuentes, produced by Fila 7 and Keteinkrepo.
- El punto, 10 December 2003, Hospital Psiquiátrico Penitenciario de Sevilla. Directed by Antonio Álamo.
- En un lugar de la niebla, 1 July 2005, Teatro Municipal, International Classical Theatre Festival of Almagro. Directed by Jesús Cracio, produced by the regional government of Castilla–La Mancha.
- Yo, Satán, 22 October 2005, Teatro Federico García Lorca, Getafe (Madrid). Directed by Álvaro Lavín, K Producciones.
- Chirigóticas, November 2005, Madrid, opening of Teatro José Monleón. Directed by Antonio Álamo, lyrics by Ana López Segovia.
- Cantando bajo las balas, Teatro Juan Bernabé, Lebrija, 23 February 2007, produced by K Producciones, directed by Álvaro Lavín.
- Deseos no deseados, 23 October 2008, Teatrex, Caracas. Directed by Juan José Martín.
- La maleta de los nervios, October 2009, Festival Madrid Sur, Teatro José Monleón, Leganés. Directed by Antonio Álamo.
- Patadas, November 2009, Teatro Central, Seville. Directed by Ramón Bocanegra.
- Veinticinco años menos un día, XXX Premio Born, production of Teatro Español and the Diputación de Sevilla, premiered in the main auditorium of Teatro Español on 17 September 2011. Directed by Pepa Gamboa.
- La copla negra, co-production with the Centro Dramático Nacional. Premiere at Teatro Palacio Valdés, Avilés, 8 March 2013. Directed by Antonio Álamo.
- España no es Uganda, Sala Cero Teatro, Seville, 6 December 2013. Directed by Antonio Álamo.
- Juanita Calamidad, Teatro Palacio Valdés, Avilés, 2 October 2015. Directed by Antonio Álamo.

=== Short theatre ===
- Una luz que ya no está (1997), short piece included in the show A bocados, produced by the Centro Dramático Nacional, Madrid, 9 April.
- Ataques de santidad (1998), short-play show produced by Teatro del Azar, Ponferrada, 20 November.
- Entre el cielo y la tierra se borraron los confines (1999), Barcelona, 2 December, directed by Oriol Grau i Elias, as part of the show Sopa de radio.
- Muriendo, Madrid, Casa de América (1999), 15 December, short piece directed by Consuelo Trujillo, in the show Cabaré Borges.
- Morir lo más lejos posible (2000), 1 May, Elche, as part of a show of four monologues by contemporary Spanish authors.
- Grande como una tumba, Caja de España Prize 2000.
- Confesiones (2001), Festival de Teatro Madrid Sur, November.
- La vida, a poco que salga bien, es maravillosa, pero no es el caso (2004), short piece in the show Los siete pecados capitales. Directed by Alfonso Zurro, produced by the Centro Andaluz de Teatro, 14 January, Teatro Central, Seville.
- Dos exiliados (2004), Buenos Aires, directed by Guillermo Ghío.

=== Dramaturgies ===
- El retablo de las maravillas, based on the text by Miguel de Cervantes, Lebrija, 30 March 2001, Teatro Juan Bernabé.
- Cielo e infierno (based on texts by Teresa of Ávila and Luis de León), 11 July 2002, Salamanca. Directed by Jesús Cracio.
- Seis fantasmas (based on the popular legend of María la Brava), 11 July 2002, Salamanca. Directed by José Luis Serrano Jaro.
- Donde hay escalas, hay tropiezos (dramaturgy of La Celestina), 12 July 2002, Salamanca. Directed by Jesús Cracio.
- Las lecciones del hambre (dramaturgy of Lázaro de Tormes), 12 July 2002, Salamanca. Directed by José Luis Serrano Jaro.
- Unamuno en la niebla (dramaturgy based on the work of Miguel de Unamuno), 4 July 2003, Salamanca, directed by Jesús Cracio.
- Donde hay escalas, hay tropiezos (second version), Salamanca, 5 July 2003, directed by Jesús Cracio.
- La cueva de Salamanca (dramaturgy of Cervantes’ interlude), 11 July 2003, Salamanca, directed by José Luis Serrano Jaro.
- Las ferias de Madrid (2004), dramaturgy of the play by Lope de Vega, Madrid, directed by Jesús Cracio.
- La mujer y el pelele (2004), dramaturgy based on the novel by Pierre Louÿs, presented at Teatro Central, Seville, during the Bienal de Flamenco, directed by Pepa Gamboa.
- El eterno retorno (2005), directed by Pepa Gamboa, produced by the Agencia de Flamenco, featuring Rocío Molina, Juan José Amador and Pasión Vega.
- El príncipe tirano, dramaturgy based on the work by Juan de la Cueva. Premiered 13 July 2006 at the Teatro Municipal de Almagro, International Classical Theatre Festival of Almagro, produced by the Centro Andaluz de Teatro and Teatro Lope de Vega, directed by Pepa Gamboa.
- Johnny cogió su fusil (2006), dramaturgy based on Dalton Trumbo's novel, 4 November, Festival Madrid Sur, directed by Jesús Cracio.
- El tiempo del diablo, September 2008, Teatro Lope de Vega, Seville; dramaturgy for Diego Carrasco, directed by Pepa Gamboa.
- Tórtola Valencia, October 2008, Teatro Lope de Vega, Seville; dramaturgy for Isabel Bayón, directed by Pepa Gamboa.
- Carmen, dramaturgy based on the novel by Prosper Mérimée, directed by Alfonso Zurro for the Compañía de Teatro Clásico de Sevilla, premiered 18 November 2010 at Teatro Lope de Vega, Seville.
- Cardenio (Shakespeare's lost play re-imagined), dramaturgy in collaboration with Gregory Doran for the Royal Shakespeare Company, based on the incomplete text by Shakespeare and Fletcher about a character from Don Quixote. Directed by Greg Doran, premiered 16 April at the Swan Theatre, Stratford-upon-Avon.
- Sueño de una noche de verano, free adaptation of Shakespeare's play. Directed by Pepa Gamboa, premiered 12 May 2011 at Teatro TNT, Seville.
- El bobo del colegio, dramaturgy based on the play by Lope de Vega, company in Vitro, directed by José Luis Fernández, premiered 29 June 2012 at the Festival de Artes Escénicas de Alcalá.
- Dando el cante, dramaturgy based on a text by Inma la Bruja, premiered 11 May 2012 at Teatro Alameda, Málaga.
- Hora de cierre, dance show with choreography by Isabel Vázquez, stage direction by Paloma Díaz and texts by Antonio Álamo, Teatro Central, Seville, 26 October 2013.
