= Diario Democracia =

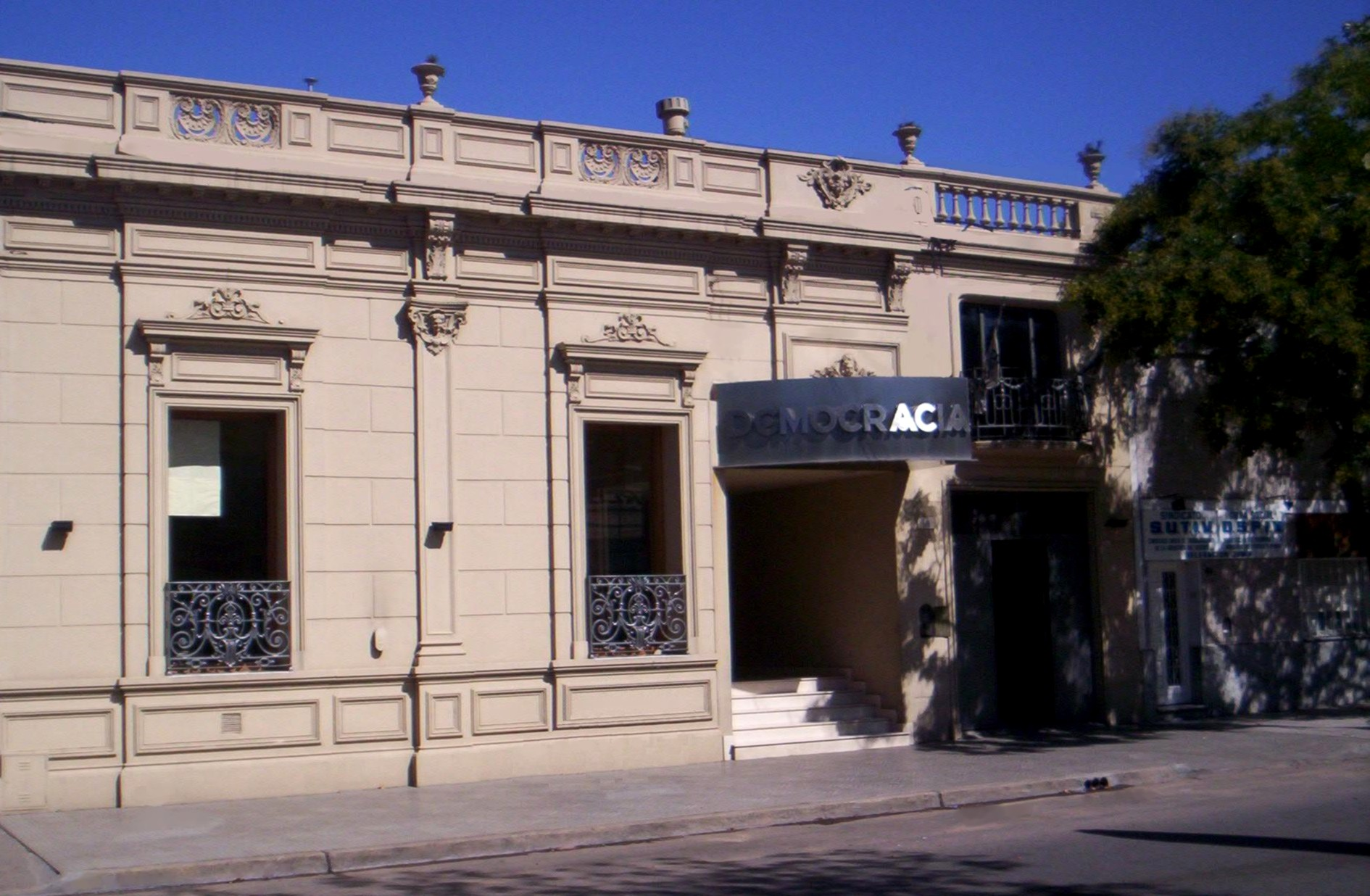
- Façade of the office in Junin
- Type: Daily newspaper
- Founder(s): Moisés Lebensohn
- Founded: 17 October 1931
- Political alignment: Radicalism; Social democracy
- Language: Spanish
- Headquarters: Junin, Argentina
- Website: Diario Democracia

Diario Democracia is an Argentine daily newspaper based in Junin, Buenos Aires Province. It was founded in October 1931 by Moisés Lebensohn.
