= The Mysteries of Tangier =

1927 film

- Directed by: Florián Rey
- Written by: Rafael López Rienda
- Produced by: Rafael López Rienda
- Cinematography: Carlos Pahissa
- Production company: Ediciones López Rienda
- Distributed by: Vilaseca y Ledesma
- Release date: 1927
- Country: Spain
- Languages: Silent; Spanish intertitles

The Mysteries of Tangier or Steel Eagles (Spanish:Águilas de acero o los misterios de Tánger) is a 1927 Spanish silent adventure film directed by Florián Rey.

== Cast ==
- Francisco Corrales 'Negro Pancho'
- Pedro Larrañaga
- Rafael López Rienda
- Ricardo Núñez
- Elita Panquer
- Ricardo Prieto
- Julio Ruiz de Alda as Aviador
- Luis Suevos as Aviador

== Bibliography ==
- Eva Woods Peiró. White Gypsies: Race and Stardom in Spanish Musical Films. U of Minnesota Press, 2012.
