= Rafael Rivelles =

Spanish actor (1898–1971)

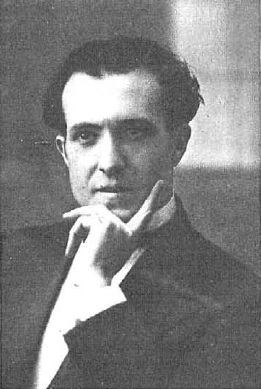
- Born: Rafael Félix Rivelles Guillén; 23 December 1898; El Cabañal (Valencia), Spain
- Died: 3 December 1971 (aged 72); Madrid, Spain
- Spouse: Rosa Fontana (second wife)
- Children: Amparo Rivelles

Rafael Félix Rivelles Guillén (23 December 1898 – 3 December 1971) was a Spanish actor born in El Cabañal (El Cabanyal), a small town in the province of Valencia, Spain. Son of play actor José Rivelles and play actress Amparo Guillén, he was the father of famous Spanish star Amparo Rivelles. In the 1930s, with the advent of talking films, he went to Hollywood to make Spanish-language versions of American films, but eventually came back to Spain.

Rivelles had two especially notable roles - the title role in Don Quijote de la Mancha, and the Prior in Marcelino pan y vino (1955). He died in Madrid on 3 December 1971 and was interred at the El Cabanyal Cemetery in Valencia along with his father.

== Filmography ==
- 1914: Prueba trágica
- 1931: La Mujer X (Lady X) - Luis Floriot
- 1931: El Embrujo de Sevilla (The Charm of Seville) - Paco Quiñones
- 1931: El Proceso de Mary Dugan - Fiscal
- 1931: ¿Conoces a tu mujer? - Robert Felton
- 1931: Mamá (Mommy) - Santiago
- 1932: Fog
- 1933: The Man Who Laughed at Love - Juan Herrero
- 1934: El Café de la Marina - (Castilian version)
- 1936: Nuestra Natacha - Lalo
- 1938: Carmen, la de Triana - José Navarro
- 1939: Carmen fra i rossi - Saverio (Spanish version)
- 1940: The Sin of Rogelia Sanchez - Don Fernando
- 1940: Santa Rogelia - Fernando
- 1942: Capitan Tempesta (Captain Storm) - Lachinsky
- 1942: Il Leone di Damasco (The Lion of Damascus) - Lachinsky
- 1942: Goyescas (Goyesque) - Capitán Fernando Pizarro
- 1944: Lessons in Good Love - Federico Montero
- 1947: Don Quixote - Don Quijote (Don Quixote)
- 1954: Judas' Kiss - Judas Iscariote
- 1954: He Died Fifteen Years Ago - Coronel Acuña
- 1955: Marcelino pan y vino - El Padre Superior
- 1960: La rivolta degli schiavi (Revolt of the Slaves) - Rutilius (Rutilio)
- 1964: Cyrano et d'Artagnan - Cardinal Duc de Richelieu
- 1964: El Señor de La Salle (Master of the Halls) - Cardenal Noailles
- 1966: El Greco - Marquis of Villena

== Theatre ==
- El nido ajeno (1923)
- El bandido de la Sierra (Bandit of the Mountain) (1926)
- Carlo Monte in Monte Carlo (Carlo Monte en Monte Carlo) (1939)
- La visita que no llamó al timbre (1949)
- Al amor hay que mandarlo al colegio (1950)
- Criminal de guerra (1951).
- Callados como muertos (1952)
- Señora ama (1953)
- La mariposa y el ingeniero (1953)
- La muralla (The Wall) (1954)
- La herida luminosa (1955)
- Pepa Doncel (1956)
- La herencia (1957)
- Papá se enfada por todo (1959)
- Cuidado con las personas formales (1960)
- Reinar después de morir (1964)
