= Sighs of Spain =

1939 film

- Directed by: Benito Perojo
- Written by: Antonio Quintero; Benito Perojo; Roberto de Ribón
- Produced by: Helmut Beck-Herzog
- Starring: Miguel Ligero; Estrellita Castro; Roberto Rey
- Cinematography: Georg Bruckbauer
- Edited by: Willy Zeyn
- Music by: Juan Mostazo; Walter Sieber
- Production company: Hispano Filmproduktion
- Distributed by: Ufilms
- Release date: 16 October 1939
- Running time: 100 minutes
- Countries: Germany; Spain
- Language: Spanish

Sighs of Spain or Spanish Sighs (Spanish: Suspiros de España) is a 1939 German-Spanish comedy film directed by Benito Perojo and starring Miguel Ligero, Estrellita Castro and Roberto Rey. The film's sets were designed by the art directors Gustav A. Knauer and Alexander Mügge. It was one of five co-productions between Nationalist Spain and Nazi Germany during the late 1930s. It is takes its title from the 1903 pasodoble by Antonio Álvarez Alonso. In 1955 it was remade as a Spanish musical film Sighs of Triana.

== Cast ==
- Miguel Ligero as Relámpago
- Estrellita Castro as Sole
- Roberto Rey as Carlos Cuesta
- Concha Catalá as Dolores
- Alberto Romea as Freddy Pinto
- Pedro Fernández Cuenca as El empresario
- Fortunato García as Gerente del hotel
- Manuel Pérez as Botones
- José Escandel as Agente artístico
- Juean Calvo as Unknown role

== Bibliography ==
- De España, Rafael. Directory of Spanish and Portuguese film-makers and films. Greenwood Press, 1994.
- Pavlović, Tatjana (ed.) 100 Years of Spanish Cinema. John Wiley & Sons, 2009.
- Peiró, Eva Woods. White Gypsies: Race and Stardom in Spanish Musical Films. University of Minnesota Press, 2012.
- Winkel, Roel Vande & Welch, David. Cinema and the Swastika: The International Expansion of Third Reich Cinema. Palgrave MacMillan, 2011.
