= Valentín Parera =

Spanish actor (1895–1986)

Valentín Parera (15 July 1895, Granada – 5 April 1986, Madrid) was a Spanish actor who appeared in both silent and sound films in the 1920s and 1930s. He was married to the American singer and actress Grace Moore from 1931 until her death in a 1947 plane crash. Following his retirement from acting, Valentín Parera managed his own film and television business, splitting his time between California, New York, Málaga, Seville and Madrid. He died in 1986.

== Filmography ==
Parera acted in European films such as

- Restless Hearts (Germany, 1928)
- Wine Cellars (France/Spain, 1930)

Subsequently, Parera appeared in several Spanish-language films made in the United States by Fox Film Corporation, including:

- Yo, tú y ella (1933)
- Dos más uno dos (1934)
- Granaderos del amor (1934)
- Señora casada necesita marido (1935)
