= Antonio Álvarez Alonso =

Spanish composer

Bust of the composer Antonio Álvarez Alonso in Plaza del Rey in Cartagena (Spain). The sculpture, inaugurated in 1966, is a work of José Sánchez Lozano.

Antonio Álvarez Alonso (11 March 1867 - 22 June 1903) was a Spanish pianist and composer. He is best known for his Pasodoble Suspiros de España.
