= Benito Perojo =

Spanish film director and producer (1894–1974)

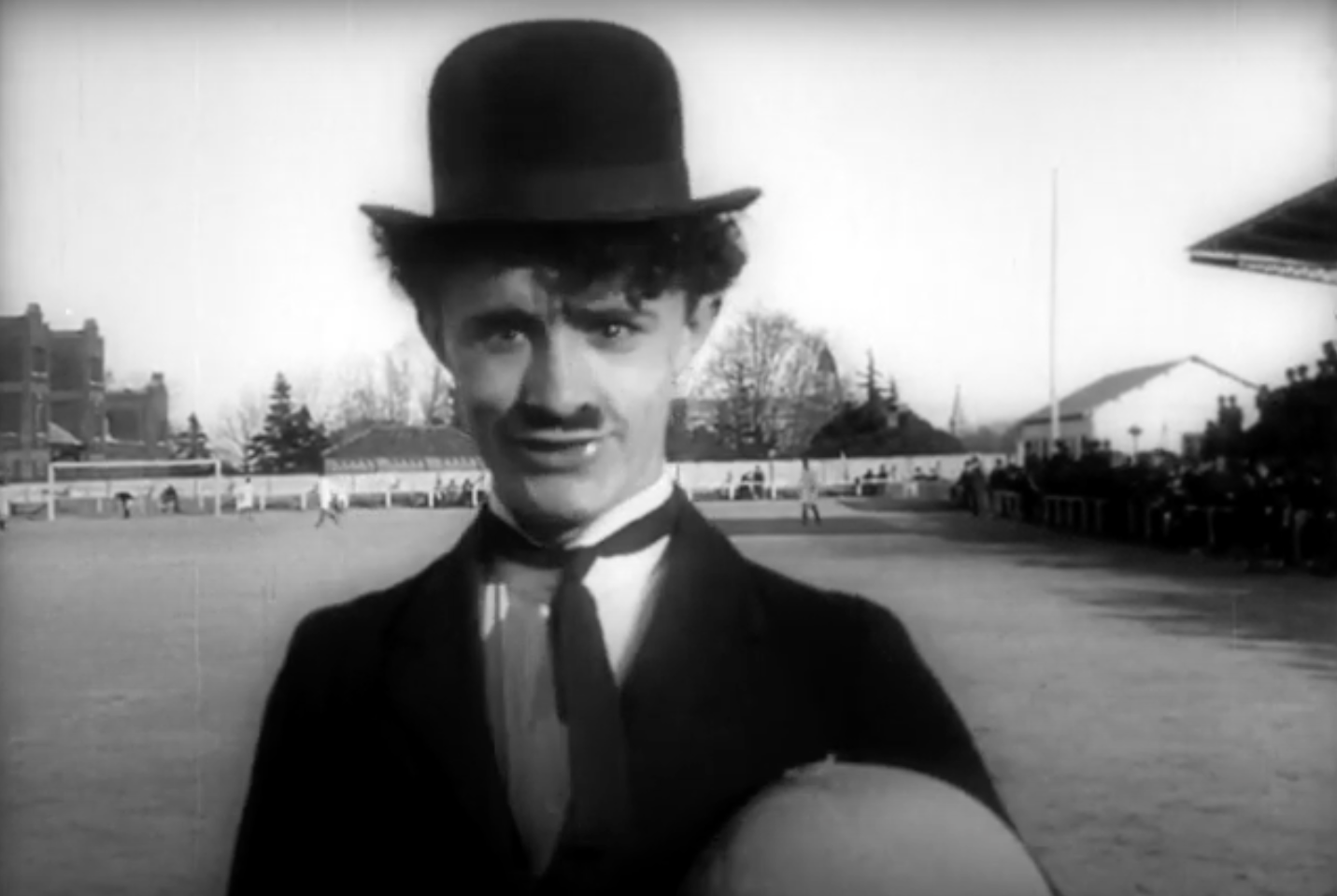
- Born: Benito Perojo González; 14 June 1894; Madrid, Spain
- Died: 11 November 1974 (aged 80); Madrid, Spain
- Occupations: Film director; film producer
- Years active: 1926–1971
- Spouse: Carmen Carreras Torres
- Children: Carmen Perojo Carreras
- Awards: Order of Civil Merit Grand Cross

Benito Perojo González (Madrid, 14 June 1894 – Madrid, 11 November 1974) was a Spanish film director and film producer.

== Biography ==
Son of José Perojo Figueras (1850–1908), a journalist and politician of Cuban origin, by his wife, Ana Cortina Fuentes (1871–1954).

On 18 July 1966 he was honoured by the Caballero Gran Cruz de la Orden del Mérito Civil.

He died in Madrid on 11 November 1974 aged 80 and he was survived by his daughter Carmen Perojo Carreras.

== Selected filmography ==
=== Director ===
- Malvaloca (1926)
- Restless Hearts (1928)
- La bodega (1929)
- The Charm of Seville (1931)
- Fog (1932)
- The Man Who Laughed at Love (1933)
- World Crisis (1934)
- Paloma Fair (1935)
- Bound for Cairo (1935)
- The Barber of Seville (1938)
- Mariquilla Terremoto (1938)
- Sighs of Spain (1939)
- La última Falla (1940)
- The Reluctant Hero (1941)
- Goyescas (1942)
- La Casta Susana (1944)
- Seven Women (1944)
- Los majos de Cádiz (1946)
- The Songstress (1946)
- La copla de la Dolores (1947)
- White Horse Inn (1948)
- Melancholic Autumn (1958, producer)

=== Producer ===
- Love on Wheels (1954)
- Sighs of Triana (1955)
- The Adventures of Gil Blas (1956)
- A Ray of Light (1960)
- An Angel Has Arrived (1961)
- The Fair of the Dove (1963)
- La pérgola de las flores (1965)
- Un novio para dos hermanas (1966)
- Las Locas del conventillo (1966)
- Great Friends (1967)
