= List of Spanish films of the 1940s =

A list of notable films produced in the Cinema of Spain, ordered by year of release in the 1940s. For an alphabetical list of articles on Spanish films, see Category:Spanish films.

== 1940 ==
Title	Director	Cast	Genre	Notes
Marianela	Benito Perojo	Mary Carrillo, Julio Peña, Rafael Calvo	Drama	
Stowaway on Board	Florián Rey	Ismael Merlo, Antonio Casal	Comedy	

== 1941 ==
Title	Director	Cast	Genre	Notes
La famosa Luz María		Manolo Moran, Lupe Sino		

== 1942 ==
Title	Director	Cast	Genre	Notes
The Cursed Village	Florián Rey	Florencia Bécquer	Drama	
Goyescas	Benito Perojo	Imperio Argentina, Rafael Rivelles	Musical	
El hombre que se quiso matar	Rafael Gil	Antonio Casal, Rosita Yarza		
El abanderado	Eusebio Fernández Ardavín	Alfredo Mayo, Mercedes Vecino		
Los ladrones somos gente honrada	Ignacio F. Iquino	Amparo Rivelles, Antonio Riquelme, Fernando Freyre de Andrade	Comedy	Adaptation of Enrique Jardiel Poncela's play
Los misterios de Tanger	Carlos Fernández Cuenca	Estrellita Castro, Manuel Luna, Raúl Cancio, Erasmo Pascual	Drama	Germán López Prieto
Malvaloca	Luis Marquina	Amparo Rivelles	Drama	Based on a Joaquín Álvarez Quintero play
Raza	José Luis Sáenz de Heredia	Alfredo Mayo, Ana Mariscal	War drama	Based on a novel by Franco. Recut in the 1950s to remove fascist elements.
The White Dove	Claudio de la Torre	Juanita Reina, Tony D'Algy, Josefina de la Torre	Musical	

== 1943 ==
Title	Director	Cast	Genre	Notes
Cristina Guzmán	Gonzalo Delgrás	Marta Santaolalla, Ismael Merlo	Drama	
Cinnamon Flower	Eduardo García Maroto	Juanita Reina, José María Seoane	Musical comedy	
El 13 – 13	Luis Lucia	Rafael Durán, Marta Santaolalla	Comedy	
Eloisa Is Under an Almond Tree	Rafael Gil	Amparo Rivelles, Rafael Durán	Comedy	Based on Enrique Jardiel Poncela's play with the same title
A Famous Gentleman	José Buchs	Amparo Rivelles, Alfredo Mayo	Drama	
Fantastic Night	Luis Marquina	Paola Barbara, Carlos Muñoz, Isabel de Pomés	Drama	
Fever	Primo Zeglio	Paola Barbara, Carlo Tamberlani, Mary Carrillo	Drama	Co-production with Italy
The House of Rain	Antonio Román	Luis Hurtado, Blanca de Silos, Carmen Viance	Drama	
It Happened in Damascus	José López Rubio	Paola Barbara, Germana Paolieri, Miguel Ligero	Comedy	Co-production with Italy
The Scandal	José Luis Sáenz de Heredia	Armando Calvo	Drama	Based on the novel by Pedro Antonio de Alarcón
Traces of Light	Rafael Gil	Isabel de Pomés, Antonio Casal	Comedy	
Viaje sin destino	Rafael Gil		Comedy	

== 1944 ==
Title	Director	Cast	Genre	Notes
Life Begins at Midnight	Juan de Orduña	José Isbert	Screwball comedy	
Lola Montes	Antonio Román	Conchita Montenegro, Luis Prendes, Jesús Tordesillas	Historical	
The Tower of the Seven Hunchbacks	Edgar Neville	Antonio Casal, Isabel de Pomés, Guillermo Marín	Mystery	
Santander, la ciudad en llamas	Luis Marquina	Rosita Yarza, Guillermina Grin, Julia Pachelo, Félix de Pomés	Drama	Written by Germán López Prieto
Ella, él y sus millones	Juan de Orduña	Rafael Durán, José Isbert	Screwball comedy	
Tuvo la culpa Adán	Juan de Orduña	Rafael Durán	Screwball comedy	
El clavo (The Nail)	Rafel Gil	Amparo Rivelles, Rafael Durán	Crime / Love	Based on a short story by Pedro Antonio de Alarcón. Great success

== 1945 ==
Title	Director	Cast	Genre	Notes
Bamboo	José Luis Sáenz de Heredia	Imperio Argentina, Sara Montiel	Historical comedy	
The Captain's Ship	Florián Rey	Paola Barbara, Manuel Luna	Drama	
Carnival Sunday	Edgar Neville	Fernando Fernán Gómez, Conchita Montes, Guillermo Marín	Crime	
La vida en un hilo	Edgar Neville	Conchita Montes, Rafael Durán, Guillermo Marín	Comedy	
Last Stand in the Philippines	Antonio Román	Armando Calvo, Manolo Morán, Guillermo Marín, Fernando Rey	Historical	About the 1898 Spanish–American War in the Philippines seen with Franco's propagandist speech.
El destino se disculpa	José Luis Sáenz de Heredia	Rafael Durán, Fernando Fernán Gómez, Manolo Morán	Comedy	Based on a Wenceslao Fernández Flórez novel adapted by himself

== 1946 ==
Title	Director	Cast	Genre	Notes
The Crime of Bordadores Street	Edgar Neville	Conchita Montes	Crime	
The Emigrant	Ramón Torrado	Miriam Di San Servolo, Manolo Morán, Raúl Cancio	Drama	
Gentleman Thief	Ricardo Gascón	Luis Prendes, Silvia Morgan	Comedy	
A New Play	Juan de Orduña	Irasema Dilián, Roberto Font, Jesús Tordesillas	Historical	
The Prodigal Woman	Rafael Gil	Rafael Durán, Paola Barbara, Fernando Rey	Drama	Pedro Antonio de Alarcón novel
When the Night Comes	Jerónimo Mihura	Irasema Dilián, Julio Peña, Guillermina Grin	Drama	

== 1947 ==
Title	Director	Cast	Genre	Notes
Anguish	José Antonio Nieves Conde	Rafael Bardem, Julia Caba Alba	Crime	
The Black Siren	Carlos Serrano de Osma	Fernando Fernán Gómez, Isabel de Pomés	Drama	
The Bullfighter's Suit	Edgar Neville	José Nieto, José Prada	Drama	
Don Quixote	Rafael Gil	Rafael Rivelles, Sara Montiel	Historical	
Four Women	Antonio del Amo	Fosco Giachetti, María Denis	Drama	
Lola Leaves for the Ports	Juan de Orduña	Juanita Reina, Nani Fernández, Manuel Luna	Musical	
Nada	Edgar Neville	Conchita Montes	Drama	Based on the famous Nada by Carmen Laforet
The Princess of the Ursines	Luis Lucia	Ana Mariscal, Fernando Rey, Eduardo Fajardo	Historical	
Song of Dolores	Benito Perojo	Imperio Argentina		Entered into the 1947 Cannes Film Festival
Three Mirrors	Ladislao Vajda	Virgílio Teixeira, Paola Barbara, João Villaret	Mystery drama	Co-production with Portugal
When the Angels Sleep	Ricardo Gascón	Amedeo Nazzari, Clara Calamai, Maria Eugénia	Drama	Co-production with Italy

== 1948 ==
Title	Director	Cast	Genre	Notes
Anchor Button	Ramón Torrado	Fernando Fernán Gómez, Jorge Mistral	Comedy	There are several sequels and remakes.
The Butterfly That Flew Over the Sea	Antonio de Obregón	Luis Hurtado, Guillermina Green	Drama	
Confidences	Jerónimo Mihura	Julio Peña, Sara Montiel, Guillermo Marín	Drama	
Doña María the Brave	Luis Marquina	Tina Gascó, Luis Hurtado, Adriano Domínguez	Historical	
The Drummer of Bruch	Ignacio F. Iquino	Ana Mariscal, Juan de Landa	Historical	
Guest of Darkness	Antonio del Amo	Carlos Muñoz, Pastora Peña	Historical	
The Howl	Ferruccio Cerio	Elli Parvo, Roldano Lupi, Rafael Bardem	Mystery	Co-production with Italy
Life in Shadows	Lorenzo Llobet Gracia	Fernando Fernán Gómez	War drama	Filmgoer; not released until 1952
Madness for Love	Juan de Orduña	Aurora Bautista, Fernando Rey, Sara Montiel, Jorge Mistral	Historical drama	The loves and madness of Joanna of Castile, Queen of Spain
Mare Nostrum	Rafael Gil	María Félix, Fernando Rey	Drama	
The Party Goes On	Enrique Gómez	Antonio Casal, María Isbert	Drama	
The Sunless Street	Rafael Gil	António Vilar, Amparo Rivelles, Manolo Morán	Drama	Written by Miguel Mihura
A Toast for Manolete	Florián Rey	Paquita Rico, Pedro Ortega	Biopic	

== 1949 ==
Title	Director	Cast	Genre	Notes
The Captain from Loyola	José Díaz Morales	Rafael Durán, Maruchi Fresno	Historical	
Currito of the Cross	Luis Lucia	Jorge Mistral, Manuel Luna	Drama	
The Duchess of Benameji	Luis Lucia	Amparo Rivelles, Irene Caba Alba	Historical	
The Guitar of Gardel	León Klimovsky	Carmen Sevilla, Antonio Casal	Musical	Co-production with Argentina
His Heart Awake	Jerónimo Mihura	Conrado San Martín, José Nieto, Margarita Andrey	Drama	
I'm Not Mata Hari	Benito Perojo	Niní Marshall, Virgílio Teixeira	Comedy	
In a Corner of Spain	Jerónimo Mihura	Carlos Agostí, Juan de Landa	Drama	
Jalisco Sings in Seville	Fernando de Fuentes	Jorge Negrete, Carmen Sevilla, Jesús Tordesillas	Musical	Co-production with Mexico
Just Any Woman	Rafael Gil	María Félix, António Vilar	Drama	
A Man on the Road	Manuel Mur Oti	Ana Mariscal, Matilde Artero	Drama	
My Beloved Juan	Jerónimo Mihura	Conchita Montes, Juan de Landa, Conrado San Martín	Comedy	Based on Miguel Mihura's famous play and written by himself
Ninety Minutes	Antonio del Amo	Nani Fernández, Enrique Guitart	Drama	
Peace	José Díaz Morales	Rafael Durán, Emilia Guiú, Alfredo Mayo	Drama	
Rumbo	Ramón Torrado	Paquita Rico, Julia Lajos	Drama	Entered into the 1951 Cannes Film Festival
Tempest	Juan de Orduña	Juanita Reina, Virgilio Teixeira, Miriam Di San Servolo	Historical	
They Always Return at Dawn	Jerónimo Mihura	Julio Peña, María Martín	Drama	
Troubled Lives	Jerónimo Mihura	Enrique Guitart, Sara Montiel, Guillermina Grin	Drama	
Wings of Youth	Antonio del Amo	António Vilar, Carlos Muñoz	Drama	
