= Conrado San Martín =

Spanish actor (1921–2019)

- Born: Conrado San Martín Prieto; 20 February 1921; Higuera de las Dueñas, Ávila, Spain
- Died: 24 April 2019 (aged 98); Madrid, Spain
- Occupation: Actor
- Years active: 1942–2015
- Spouse(s): Olga Quiles Colón (1955–2019); his death
- Children: 5 children

Conrado San Martín Prieto (20 February 1921 – 24 April 2019) was a Spanish actor with a long and prolific career. He made his film debut in 1941 and was particularly popular during the 1950s.

== Life ==
Conrado San Martín left behind a career as an amateur boxer to take small roles in the theater in the company of Cayetano Luca de Tena and to act as an extra in some films. He made his film debut with Oro vil (1941) a film directed by Eduardo García Maroto. During the 1940s, San Martín became an actor in secondary roles and was very much in demand in some of the most important Spanish films of that period: El fantasma y Doña Juanita (1944) directed by Rafael Gil, Los últimos de Filipinas (1945) directed by Antonio Román; A los pies de usted de Garcia Viñolas (1945); La princesa de los Ursinos (1947), by Luis Lucia and La Lola se va a los puertos (1947) and Locura de amor (1948), both films directed by Juan de Orduña. These roles led the Catalan production company Emisora films to give him an exclusive contract and he starred in the comedies: Siempre vuelve de madrugada (He always comes back at dawn) (1948), Despertó su corazón (Awoke his heart) (1949) and Jerónimo Mihura's Mi adorado Juan (My beloved Juan) (1949).

San Martín also took roles in the thriller Apartado de correos 1001 (1950); Mail box 1001, a film directed by Julio Salvador which was a great hit with audiences; and Relato policíaco (1954) by Antonio Isasi-Isasmendi. The success of some of these productions gave him the starring role in Amenaza (1950); Threat a film directed by Antonio Román; La patrulla, (1954) a film directed by Pedro Lazaga with Carmen Sánchez and Arturo Fernández; Pasión en el mar (1956) and o ...Y eligió el infierno (1957). He created his own production company, Laurus films, producing the melodramas: Lo que nunca muere (1954) and Sin la sonrisa de Dios (1955).

On 22 September 1955 he married Olga Quiles Colón in the property El Adamil in Monzón, and they were couple until his death.

As his career consolidated, he began to work in international co-productions like: Le legioni di Cleopatra (1959) by Vittorio Cottafavi, The Colossus of Rhodes (1960), the first film directed by Sergio Leone, King of Kings (1961), in the paper of Pompey, La Muerte silba un blues (1962), directed by Jesús Franco; the Spaghetti Western All'ombra di una colt (In the Shadow of a Colt) (1966) directed by Giovanni Grimaldi; Los largos días de la venganza (1967) directed by Florestano Vancini; Simón Bolívar (1969) a film directed by Alessandro Blasetti.

The failure of his production company eventually made him retire from the big screen in the early 1970s. He came back to take on important secondary roles a decade later in films like: Asesinato en el comité central (Murder in the Central Committee) (1983); A la pálida luz de la Luna (1985), a film directed by José María González Sinde; Extramuros (1985), a film directed by Miguel Picazo; Dragon Rapide (1986) by Jaime Camino; Boom Boom (1989) by Rosa Vergés; Riders of the Dawn (1990) by Vicente Aranda and A solas contigo (1990), a film directed by Eduardo Campoy.

He also made some appearances on television roles but in his last years he was retired from the industry.

He died on 24 April 2019.

== Selected filmography ==
- Last Stand in the Philippines (1945)
- The Princess of the Ursines (1947)
- Lola Leaves for the Ports (1947)
- Guest of Darkness (1948)
- The Howl (1948)
- In a Corner of Spain (1949)
- His Heart Awake (1949)
- They Always Return at Dawn (1949)
- My Beloved Juan (1950)
- Doubt (1951)
- Nothing Less Than an Archangel (1960)
- The Red Rose (1960)
- Revolt of the Mercenaries (1961)
- King of Kings (1961) as Pompey
- The Avenger of Venice (1964)
- Target Goldseven (1966)
- Maestros (2000)
- Vampyres (2005)
