= Autumn Roses =

Autumn Roses may refer to:

- Autumn Roses (1931 film), a 1931 Argentine short musical film
- Autumn Roses (1943 film), a 1943 Argentine film
