= Rosas de otoño =

Rosas de otoño may refer to either of two Argentine films:

- Rosas de otoño (1931 film)
- Rosas de otoño (1943 film)
