= Antonio Isasi-Isasmendi =

Spanish film director (1927–2017)

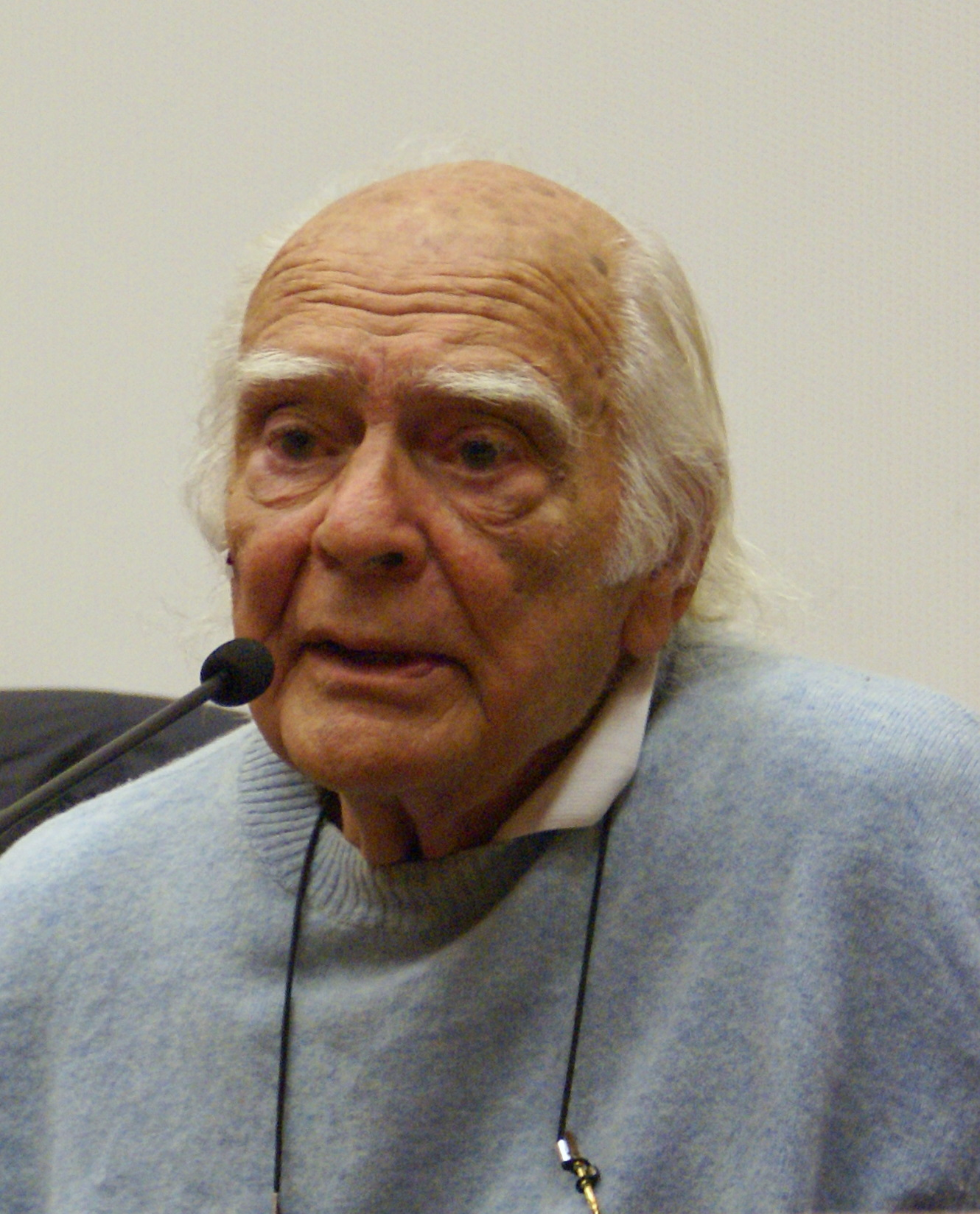
- Isasi-Isasmendi in 2011
- Born: Antonio Isasi-Isasmendi Lasa; 22 March 1927; Madrid, Spain
- Died: 28 September 2017 (aged 90); Ibiza, Spain
- Occupations: Film director Screenwriter; Film producer
- Years active: 1946–1988
- Children: María Isasi

Antonio Isasi-Isasmendi Lasa (22 March 1927 – 28 September 2017) was a Spanish film director and producer.

Isasi-Isasmendi began working in the production firm Emisora Films as an assistant manager, film editor, scriptwriter, lead producer, and finally director. In 1955 he founded his own production company, Producciones Isasi in Barcelona. He founded a second firm, Moon Films, in Madrid.

In the mid-1960s he directed a series of action films designed for the wider European market including Scaramouche (The Adventures of Scaramouche) in 1963 and Estambul 65 (That Man in Istanbul) in 1965. He made some English-language films, most notably They Came to Rob Las Vegas. He abandoned directing for a decade after making El Perro (The Dog) in 1977 in favour of producing and distributing films before returning to the director's chair with El Aire de un Crimen (The Hint of a Crime) in 1987.

He directed 13 feature films, wrote eleven and produced eight.

In 1981, he was a member of the jury at the 31st Berlin International Film Festival.

== Family ==
He had one daughter, María Isasi, from his relationship with the actress Marisa Paredes.

== Selected filmography ==
=== Director ===
- Diego Corrientes (1959)
- A Land for All (1962)
- The Adventures of Scaramouche (1963)
- That Man in Istanbul (1965)
- They Came to Rob Las Vegas (1968)
- The Summertime Killer (1972)
- El perro (1977)
- El aire de un crimen (1988)

=== Editor ===
- In a Corner of Spain (dir. Jerónimo Mihura, 1949)
- My Beloved Juan (dir. Jerónimo Mihura, 1950)
- Apartado de correos 1001 (dir. Julio Salvador, 1950)
- I Want to Marry You (1951)
- Doubt (1951)
- Last Day (dir. Antonio Román, 1952)
- Court of Justice (dir. Joaquín Luis Romero Marchent, 1953)
- Eleven Pairs of Boots (dir. Francisco Rovira Beleta, 1954)

== Prizes ==
- Honorary Goya Award (1999)
- CEC Award, Best Director (1973)
- Prize of the National Syndicate of Spectacle, Best Director (1965)
