= The Road to Babel =

1945 film

- Directed by: Jerónimo Mihura
- Written by: José Luis Sáenz de Heredia; Jerónimo Mihura
- Starring: Alfredo Mayo; Guillermina Grin; Fernando Fernán Gómez; Mary Lamar
- Cinematography: Cecilio Paniagua
- Edited by: Julio Peña
- Music by: Manuel Parada
- Production company: Chapalo Films
- Release date: 19 February 1945
- Running time: 77 minutes
- Country: Spain
- Language: Spanish

The Road to Babel (Spanish: El camino de Babel) is a 1945 Spanish comedy film directed by Jerónimo Mihura and starring Alfredo Mayo, Guillermina Grin and Fernando Fernán Gómez. Its style was close to that of a screwball comedy.

== Cast ==
- Alfredo Mayo as César Jiménez
- Guillermina Grin as Laura
- Fernando Fernán Gómez as Marcelino Pastor
- Mary Lamar as Elena
- Miguel del Castillo as Arturo
- Tita Gracia as Encarnación
- Nicolás D. Perchicot as Doctor Gamíndez
- María Brú as Doña Luisa
- Antonio Riquelme as Bruno
- María Isbert as Cloti
- José Calle as Padre de César
- Julia Lajos as Enriqueta, mujer de Arturo
- Manolo Morán as Brandolet
- Juana Mansó
- César de Nueda
- José Luis Ozores

== Bibliography ==
- Labanyi, Jo & Pavlović, Tatjana. A Companion to Spanish Cinema. John Wiley & Sons, 2012.
