= Dog in space =

Dog in space may refer to:

- A Dog in Space, a 1966 Spanish film
- Dogs in Space, an animated TV series
- Soviet space dogs, dogs sent into space in the 1950s and 60s.
