= Radio Stories =

- Spanish film poster
- Directed by: José Luis Sáenz de Heredia
- Written by: José Luis Sáenz de Heredia
- Starring: Francisco Rabal; Margarita Andrey; Xan das Bolas; Alberto Romea; Guadalupe Muñoz Sampedro; José Luis Ozores; Adrían Ortega; José Isbert; Tony Leblanc; Juanjo Menéndez
- Cinematography: Ernesto Halffter
- Edited by: Julio Peña
- Music by: Ernesto Halffter
- Release date: 25 July 1955
- Running time: 95 minutes
- Country: Spain
- Language: Spanish

Radio Stories (Spanish:Historias de la radio) is a 1955 Spanish comedy film composed by three episodes directed by José Luis Sáenz de Heredia. A decade later the director returned to the theme with his Television Stories which updated the plot, but was less successful.

== Plot ==
As a tribute to the importance of radio in the mid-20th century, three stories are told whose central axis is the listeners: some contestants who for 3,000 pesetas have to come to the studio dressed as an Eskimo, a thief who answers a call from a phone in the house where he is stealing and a school teacher who participates in a contest to get money to cure a child in his town. The stories are linked through the love story of an announcer and his fiancée and through snippets of the lives of real characters from the time of the film. The copla singer Gracia Montes appears in the film singing a popular song from Andalusia: La Romera. That singer would become one of the fundamental pillars of the copla and flamenco in Spain in the future. Other celebrities of the time that appear in the film are the bullfighter Rafael Gómez Ortega 'el Gallo' and the soccer player Luis Molowny. Years later, Sáenz de Heredia would direct Historias de la Televisión, a sort of sequel to Historias de la Radio set in television.

== Bibliography ==
- Bentley, Bernard. A Companion to Spanish Cinema. Boydell & Brewer 2008.
