= Gérard Tichy =

German-Spanish actor (1920–1992)

Gerard Tichy
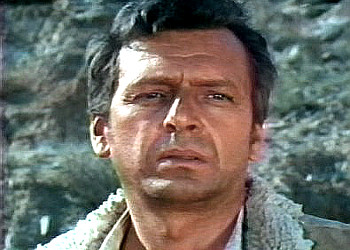
- Tichy in 100.000 dollari per Ringo (1965)
- Born: Gerhard Johannes Alexander Tichy Wondzinski; 11 March 1920; Weißenfels, Saxony-Anhalt, Germany
- Died: 11 April 1992 (aged 72); Madrid, Spain
- Other names: Gerardo Tichy
- Occupation: Actor
- Years active: 1949-1992

Gerhard Johannes Alexander Tichy Wondzinski (11 March 1920 – 11 April 1992), known as Gérard Tichy, was a German-Spanish actor who appeared in numerous films, including several international productions.

== Early life ==
Tichy was born Gerhard Johannes Alexander Tichy Wondzinski in Weißenfels, Saxony-Anhalt, the son of a doctor. After a short period as an artist, he was conscripted into the Reich Labour Service during World War II, but was later transferred into the Wehrmacht as an infantry soldier. He served in the Polish and French campaigns, but was captured by Allied forces in 1945.

He was held in a prisoner-of-war camp in Bordeaux for 18 months. Not wanting to be repatriated back to Germany, he made an escape attempt on Christmas Eve, but was quickly re-captured taken to another camp. He escaped, this time successfully, while in transit and fled to Hendaye, near the Spanish border. He attempted to enter neutral Spain by wading through the Bidasoa, and was caught by Spanish authorities. He was released from custody after being vouched for by other German expats, and settled in Madrid.

== Career ==
While working as a waiter in 1948, Tichy was spotted by director César Fernández Ardavín, who was looking for someone to play a German officer in the war film Neutrality. He subsequently starred in the war epic Balarrasa (1951) and quickly became a prominent character actor in Spanish cinema, ultimately appearing in 99 films over the course of his career. He won the CEC Award for Best Foreign Actor for his role in the 1955 film El canto del gallo.

A capable if not fluent English speaker, Tichy also appeared in several international productions that were filmed in Spain, most notably King of Kings (1961) as Joseph, El Cid (1961) playing King Ramiro, and Doctor Zhivago (1965) as Liberius, a Red partisan commander.

He appeared in numerous spaghetti Westerns, most notably Sergio Corbucci's Compañeros (1971). He also worked with noted Spanish horror film directors such as Jesus Franco (Marquis de Sade: Justine), Paul Naschy (The Beast and the Magic Sword), Amando de Ossorio (Serpiente del mar) and Juan Piquer Simón (Pieces) and famed Italian director Mario Bava (Hatchet for the Honeymoon).

Tichy also periodically returned to his native Germany, performing at the Hamburg Kammerspiele and acting in the Zarah Leander film Cuba Cabana.

== Death ==
Tichy died in Madrid on April 11, 1992.

== Selected filmography ==
- Neutrality (1949) - Deutscher Offizier
- Black Jack (1950)
- Service at Sea (1951) - Pasajero (uncredited)
- Servicio en la mar (1951) - Pasajero (uncredited)
- Cerca del cielo (1951) - Camarada defensor (uncredited)
- The Floor Burns (1952) - Eduardo Behovia
- Come Die My Love (1952) - Bill
- The Call of Africa (1952) - Capitán Andrade
- Hombre acosado (1952) - Jan Matiz
- Barco sin rumbo (1952)
- Cuba Cabana (1952) - Polizei-Oberst
- Decameron Nights (1953)
- I Was a Parish Priest (1953) - El Negro
- Pasaporte para un ángel (Órdenes secretas) (1954)
- Judas' Kiss (1954) - Pontius Pilate
- An Impossible Crime (1954) - Eugenio Certal
- He Died Fifteen Years Ago (1954) - Germán Goeritz
- Malaga (1954) - Cronkhite
- Kubala (1955)
- Lo que nunca muere (1955) - Pierre
- The Cock Crow (1955) - Gans
- Nunca es demasiado tarde (1956) - Jorge
- Alexander the Great (1956) - (uncredited)
- Miedo (1956)
- Curra Veleta (1956) - Alfredo Brighton
- Minutos antes (1956)
- Cuando el valle se cubra de nieve (1957)
- ...Y eligió el infierno (1957)
- Aquellos tiempos del cuplé (1958) - Jorge
- Cuatro en la frontera (1958) - Julio
- Hospital general (1958)
- El frente infinito (1959) - Capitán Estrada
- Molokai, la isla maldita (1959) - Capitán
- Un ángel tuvo la culpa (1960) - Sr. X
- Alerta en el cielo (1961) - Sargento Bell
- King of Kings (1961) - Joseph
- El Cid (1961) - King Ramiro
- Pecado de amor (1961) - Gerardo Esquivel
- The Happy Thieves (1961) - Antonio, Prado Museum Guard
- Queen of The Chantecler (1962) - Henri Duchel
- Face of Terror (1962) - Dr. Chambers
- Los culpables (1962) - Salvador
- Senda torcida (1963) - Silvestre
- The Blancheville Monster (1963) - Rodéric De Blancheville
- Casablanca, Nest of Spies (1963) - Mayor
- The Secret Seven (1963) - Rabirio
- La muerte silba un blues (1964) - Carlos Moroni
- La Chance et l'Amour (1964) - Un truand (segment "Une chance explosive")
- Gunmen of the Rio Grande (1964) - Zack Williams
- Un tiro por la espalda (1964)
- El niño y el muro (1965) - Guardia alemán #2
- The Hell of Manitoba (1965) - Jack Villaine
- That Man in Istanbul (1965) - Charly Cohen
- Marie-Chantal contre le docteur Kha (1965) - Maitre d'Hôtel
- Man from Canyon City (1965) - Hargitay
- Playa de Formentor (1965) - Carlos Sanromá
- Operation Double Cross (1965) - Matras
- 100.000 dollari per Ringo (1965) - Tom Sherry
- Doctor Zhivago (1965) - Liberius, Red Partisan Commander
- Agent X-77 Orders to Kill (1966) - Dr. Reichmann
- 4 Dollars of Revenge (1966) - Clifford
- The Sea Pirate (1966) - Kernan
- Le Solitaire passe à l'attaque (1966) - Bernsen
- The Texican (1966) - Boyd Thompson
- Il grande colpo di Surcouf (1966) - Kernan
- Superargo Versus Diabolicus (1966) - Diabolikus
- Master Stroke (1967) - Max
- Face to Face (1967) - Mayor of Silvertown (uncredited)
- Madigan's Millions (1968) - J. P. Ogilvie
- The Magnificent Tony Carrera (1968) - Serge
- Sartana Does Not Forgive (1968) - Joe Sullivan
- They Came to Rob Las Vegas (1968) - Sheriff Klinger
- Hot Line (1968) - Truman
- Cantando a la vida (1969)
- Hora cero: Operación Rommel (1969) - Gen. von Gruber
- Marquis de Sade: Justine (1969) - Comte Courville
- Murder by Music (1969) - Inspector
- Hatchet for the Honeymoon (1970) - Dr. Kalleway
- Cuadrilátero (1970) - Óscar
- El último día de la guerra (1970) - Pvt. Bronc
- Compañeros (1970) - Lieutenant
- Un verano para matar (1972) - Alex
- Les Charlots font l'Espagne (1972) - Le capitaine du grand voilier
- La isla misteriosa y el capitán Nemo (1973) - Cyrus Smith
- The Corruption of Chris Miller (1973) - Commissioner
- La orgía de los muertos (1973) - Professor Leon Droila
- Striptease (1978) - Play Boy
- Venus de fuego (1978) - Detective
- Maravillas (1981) - Benito
- Misterio en la isla de los monstruos (1981) (a.k.a. Mystery on Monster Island) - Capt. Turkott
- L'ultimo harem (1981) - (uncredited)
- Los diablos del mar (1982) - Captain Hull
- Pieces (1982) - Dr. Jennings
- La Bestia y la Espada Magica (1983) (a.k.a. The Beast and the Magic Sword) - Otton el grande
- La hoz y el Martínez (1985) - Dimitri Vasilievich
- ¡Qué tía la C.I.A.! (1985) - Agente de la RFA
- Serpiente de mar (1985) a.k.a. The Sea Serpent
- Romanza final (Gayarre) (1986)
- Yo me bajo en la próxima, ¿y usted? (1992) - (final film role)
