= Troubled Lives =

1949 film

- Directed by: Jerónimo Mihura
- Written by: Miguel Mihura
- Starring: Enrique Guitart; Sara Montiel; Guillermina Grin
- Cinematography: Ricardo Torres
- Music by: Manuel Parada
- Production company: Sirena Films
- Release date: 27 June 1949
- Running time: 98 minutes
- Country: Spain
- Language: Spanish

Troubled Lives (Spanish: Vidas confusas) is a 1949 Spanish drama film directed by Jerónimo Mihura and starring Enrique Guitart, Sara Montiel and Guillermina Grin.

== Cast ==
- Enrique Guitart
- Sara Montiel
- Guillermina Grin
- Julia Caba Alba
- José Prada
- Juana Mansó
- Dolores Bremón
- Concha López Silva
- Guillermo Marín
- Carlos Muñoz
- Aníbal Vela

== Bibliography ==
- De España, Rafael. Directory of Spanish and Portuguese film-makers and films. Greenwood Press, 1994.
- Morcillo, Aurora G. The Seduction of Modern Spain: The Female Body and the Francoist Body Politic. Bucknell University Press, 2010.
