= Isidoro Goldberger =

German-born Spanish cinematographer

- Born: 28 January 1892; Berlin; German Empire
- Died: Unknown
- Other name: Issy Goldberger
- Occupation: Cinematographer
- Years active: 1935 - 1965

Isidoro Goldberger (born 1892) was a German-born Spanish cinematographer who worked on around thirty films during his career. In 1949 he worked on In a Corner of Spain, the first Spanish film in colour which used the Cinefotocolor process. He was the brother of Willy Goldberger, who was also a cinematographer.

== Selected filmography ==
- The Wildcat (1936)
- Journey to Nowhere (1942)
- A Palace for Sale (1942)
- In a Corner of Spain (1949)
- Closed Exit (1955)

== Bibliography ==
- Bentley, Bernard. A Companion to Spanish Cinema. Boydell & Brewer 2008.
