= The Sparrows of Paris =

1953 film

- Film poster
- Directed by: Maurice Cloche
- Written by: Maurice Cloche; André Hornez
- Produced by: Maurice Cloche
- Starring: Jean-Pierre Aumont; Louis de Funès; Virginia Keiley
- Cinematography: Nicolas Hayer
- Edited by: Renée Gary
- Music by: Paul Bonneau
- Production company: Les Films Maurice Cloche
- Distributed by: Ciné Sélection
- Release date: 12 June 1953
- Running time: 90 minutes
- Country: France
- Language: French

The Sparrows of Paris (French: Moineaux de Paris) is a 1953 French comedy drama film directed and written by Maurice Cloche and starring Jean-Pierre Aumont, Louis de Funès and Virginia Keiley.

== Plot ==
Impresario Mr. Smith and his daughter want to engage a group of French musicians. On this occasion, Peggy Smith wears a necklace with a locket. One of the musicians identifies the locket as property of his grandmother. When Ms. Smith insists on keeping it, the musician calls for his ancestors, and the reborn French elite soldier Césarin answers.

== Cast ==
- Jean-Pierre Aumont as Césarin, Horse Grenadier of the Imperial Guard (Napoleon I)
- Louis de Funès as the doctor
- Virginia Keiley as Peggy Smith, the impresario's daughter
- Max Elloy as P'tit Louis
- Robert Lombard as the choir school manager
- Louis Gimberg as Mr Smith, the American impresario
- Little Singers of the Wooden Cross as Themselves
- Philippe Olive
- Paul Demange
- Léonce Corne
- André Dalibert
- Odette Barencey
- Jacques Famery
- Emile Morel
