= Georges Garvarentz =

Georges Garvarentz Ժորժ Տիրան Կառվարենց
- Georges Garvarentz (with Charles Aznavour on the left)

Background information
- Also known as: George Diran Wem
- Born: 1 April 1932; Athens, Greece
- Origin: Paris, France
- Died: 19 March 1993 (aged 60) Paris, France
- Genres: Pop, chanson, film score
- Occupation: Composer
- Years active: 1950–1993
- Label: EMI
- Website: fan.aznavour.free.fr/hommageGG.htm

Georges Diran Garvarentz (Armenian: Ժորժ Տիրան Կառվարենց, 1 April 1932 - 19 March 1993) was an Armenian-French composer, noted for his music for films and Charles Aznavour's songs.

== Biography ==
Georges Garvarentz was born in Athens, Greece, to a family of Armenian immigrants. His father, literature professor and poet Kevork Garvarentz, was the author of the Armenian military anthem.

In 1942 Garvarentz's family moved to Paris, France, where Georges attended Conservatoire de Paris.

== Career ==
In 1956 Georges met Charles Aznavour and started writing music for his songs. Together they wrote over a hundred songs, including "Prends garde à toi" (1956), "Et pourtant" (1962), "Il faut saisir sa chance" (1962), "Retiens la nuit" (1962), "La plus belle pour aller danser" (1964), "Hier encore" (1964), "Paris au mois d'août" ("Paris in August", 1966), "Désormais" (1969), and "Une vie d'amour" (1980).

The period from the latter half of the 1980s until Garvarentz's death in 1993 represented one of the most productive and enduring periods of his collaboration with Aznavour.

Despite the performer then approaching 60 years of age and having already long been an established star with a repertoire of recognisable classics and hits, Garvarentz's and Aznavour's works of this epoch yielded a wave of more musically contemporary works that came to enjoy equal billing alongside Aznavour's earlier successes: two albums’ worth of new songs composed by Garvarentz and written by Aznavour were recorded in 1986 and released as the albums Aznavour 1986: Je bois that same year and Embrasse-moi in 1987, which gave rise to numerous songs that would become staples of Aznavour's concert performances for the rest of his career, including "Je me raccroche à toi", "Je bois", "Les émigrants", "Une idée", and others. This was followed in 1991 by the album Aznavour 92 and its new songs "Vous et tu", "Napoli chante" and "La Marguerite".

Their final new works of the era were on Aznavour's 1994 album Toi et moi (released in 1995 in the anglophone world as You and Me); Garvarentz's last collaboration with Aznavour, the song "Ton doux visage", was released on this album.

In 1965, Georges married Charles Aznavour's sister, Aida Aznavourian.

Georges Garvarentz also composed over one hundred fifty film scores, including scores for Taxi for Tobruk (1961), Les Parisiennes (1962), The Devil and the Ten Commandments (1962), Le Rat d'Amérique (1963), That Man in Istanbul (1965), The Sultans (1966), The Sea Pirate (1966), Triple Cross (1966), The Peking Medallion (1967), Caroline chérie (1968), They Came to Rob Las Vegas (1968), The Southern Star (1969), Le Temps des loups (1970), Love Me Strangely (1971), Someone Behind the Door (1971), The Pebbles of Etratat (1972), Murder in a Blue World (1973), Killer Force (1976), Teheran 43 (1981), Hambone and Hillie (1983), The Triumphs of a Man Called Horse (1983), Too Scared to Scream (1985), Yiddish Connection (1986), A Star for Two (1991), and Catorce estaciones (1991)

In 1979, he wrote the score to The Golden Lady, and co-wrote the title song for The Three Degrees, together with lead singer Sheila Ferguson.

Garvarentz is the author of the musical comedy Deux anges sont venus and an operetta Douchka.

== Awards and recognition ==
- In 1964 Garvarentz was awarded a special prize by the Chansonnier society
- In 1989 Garvarentz has received a Gemini award for the Best Original Music Score - Program or Miniseries
