= Jules Kruger =

French cinematographer

- Born: 12 July 1891; Strasbourg, German Empire
- Died: 13 December 1959 (aged 68); Clichy, Hauts-de-Seine, France
- Occupation: Cinematographer
- Years active: 1908–1952 (film)

Jules Kruger (1891–1959) was a French cinematographer. He is known particularly for films which he photographed in the 1920s and 1930s for Abel Gance, Marcel L'Herbier, Raymond Bernard, and Julien Duvivier. He also worked in Great Britain and in Spain.

== Selected filmography ==
- Violettes impériales (Imperial Violets, 1924), dir. Henry Roussel
- Âme d'artiste (Heart of an Actress, 1924), dir. Germaine Dulac
- La Terre promise (The Promised Land, 1925), dir. Henry Roussel
- Napoléon (1927), dir. Abel Gance
- L'Argent (1928), dir. Marcel L'Herbier
- Cagliostro (1929), dir. Richard Oswald
- Tarakanova (1930), dir. Raymond Bernard
- La Fin du monde (End of the World, 1931), dir. Abel Gance
- Les Croix de bois (Wooden Crosses, 1932), dir Raymond Bernard
- Der träumende Mund (Dreaming Lips, 1932), dir. Paul Czinner
- L'Épervier (1933), dir. Marcel L'Herbier
- Lac aux dames (Lake of Ladies, 1934), dir. Marc Allégret
- Maria Chapdelaine (1934), dir. Julien Duvivier
- Les Misérables (1934), dir. Raymond Bernard
- Tartarin de Tarascon (1934), dir. Raymond Bernard
- La Bandera (1935), dir. Julien Duvivier
- Golgotha (1935), dir. Julien Duvivier
- Veille d'armes (1935), dir. Marcel L'Herbier
- La Belle Équipe (1936), dir. Julien Duvivier
- Anne-Marie (1936), dir. Raymond Bernard
- Club de femmes (1936), dir. Jacques Deval
- Le Roi (The King, 1936), dir. Pierre Colombier
- La Dame de Malacca (Woman of Malacca, 1937), dir. Marc Allégret
- Pépé le Moko (1937), dir. Julien Duvivier
- Les Perles de la couronne (The Pearls of the Crown, 1937), dir. Sacha Guitry
- St Martin's Lane (1938), dir. Tim Whelan
- Vessel of Wrath (1938), dir. Erich Pommer
- La Charrette fantôme (The Phantom Carriage, 1939), dir. Julien Duvivier
- Le Récif de corail (1939), dir. Maurice Gleize
- Caprices (1942), dir. Léo Joannon
- Les Inconnus dans la maison (The Strangers in the House, 1942), dir. Henri Decoin
- Mam'zelle Bonaparte (1942), dir. Maurice Tourneur
- Untel père et fils (The Heart of a Nation, 1943), dir. Julien Duvivier
- Graine au vent (Sowing the Wind, 1944), dir. Maurice Gleize
- Au petit bonheur (Happy Go Lucky, 1946), dir. Marcel L'Herbier
- Siempre vuelven de madrugada (They Always Return at Dawn, 1949), dir. Jerónimo Mihura
- Mi adorado Juan (My Beloved Juan, 1950), dir. Jerónimo Mihura
- La canción de la Malibrán (Malibran's Song, 1951), dir. Luis Escobar Kirkpatrick
