= Quanto sei bella Roma =

- Directed by: Marino Girolami
- Written by: Gianfranco Parolini; Giorgio Simonelli
- Screenplay by: Gianfranco Parolini
- Starring: Claudio Villa
- Cinematography: Emilio Foriscot; Francesco Izzarelli
- Edited by: Antonio Cánovas
- Music by: Franco Riva
- Release date: 1959
- Language: Italian

Quanto sei bella Roma (Spanish: ¡Qué bella eres, Roma!) is a 1959 Italian-Spanish romantic comedy film directed by Marino Girolami and starring Claudio Villa.

== Plot ==
Gino and Claudio are two young friends who work for Nando, one as a mechanic, the other as a taxi driver. Both are officially engaged, and the girlfriends are two sisters, Lorella and Patrizia. Nonetheless, the two young men are not alien to allowing themselves some innocent sentimental adventure when the opportunity arises. Gino by chance makes the acquaintance of Ava and Mary, two American girls who have come to visit Rome and, supported by his friend Claudio, briefly makes friends with the two foreigners. In order not to be disturbed in their adventure, Gino and Claudio give their shy friend Nino the task of keeping the two girlfriends at bay.

Despite this precaution, Lorella and Patrizia soon discover the devious undertaking to which their boyfriends are dedicated: stung by jealousy, they protest vigorously and contemplate revenge. Ava and Mary also realize that their knights are doing a bad deed and having met Lorella and Patrizia by chance, they agree with them in order to punish the two Don Juan. They first introduce Gino and Claudio to their father, a rude businessman who by dint of terrible handshakes reduces them as submissive as ever, while poisoning them with diabolical cocktails.

At this point the two are put with their backs to the wall and invited to make their choice: either Ava and Mary (and America), or Lorella and Patrizia (and Italy). Gino chooses America and together with his friend goes to the Grand Hotel to ask for Ava's hand, but, instead of the American, he finds Sor Checco, father of Lorella and Patrizia who urges the two young people to keep their commitments . Of course, everything fits in the best way: the two couples reconstitute themselves. Ava has found her prince charming in Nino and Nando will also marry an American.

== Cast ==
- Claudio Villa as Claudio
- Ennio Girolami as Gino
- Lorella De Luca as Lorella
- Maria Fiore as Ava
- María del Valle as Mary
- Laura Granados as Elizabeth
- Raffaele Pisu as Nando
- Carlo Delle Piane as Carletto
- Fanfulla as "Angoscia"
- Giancarlo Zarfati as Cesaretto
- Maruja Bustos as Patrizia
- Manolo Gómez Bur as Nino
- Tina Gascó as Tina
- Mimmo Poli as Director of "Carillon"
- Tony Aloisi as Gegè
- Enzo Girolami as Kid Sventola
- Alberto Sorrentino
- Juan Calvo as Sor Checco
- Félix de Pomés
- Ignazio Dolce as Giorgio
- Ughetto Bertucci as Taxi Driver
