= The Sea Pirate =

- Directed by: Sergio Bergonzelli; Roy Rowland
- Written by: José Antonio de la Loma; Georges de La Grandière; Gerald Savery; Giovanni Simonelli
- Produced by: Roy Rowland; Nathan Wachsberger
- Starring: Gérard Barray
- Cinematography: Juan Gelpí
- Music by: Georges Garvarentz
- Release date: 1966
- Language: Italian

The Sea Pirate (French: Surcouf, le tigre des sept mers, Italian: Surcouf, l'eroe dei sette mari, Spanish: El tigre de los siete mares, also known as The Fighting Corsair) is a 1966 French-Italian-Spanish adventure film directed by Sergio Bergonzelli and Roy Rowland.

== Cast ==
- Gérard Barray as Robert Surcouf
- Antonella Lualdi as Margaret Carruthers
- Terence Morgan as Lord Blackwood
- Geneviève Casile as Marie-Catherine
- Armand Mestral as el capità Hans
- George Rigaud as French Admiral
- Gérard Tichy as Kernan
- Alberto Cevenini as Garneray
- Giani Esposito as Napoleon
- Fernando Sancho as Jailer
- Antonio Molino Rojo as Andre Chambles
- Ivano Staccioli as Decrees
- Aldo Sambrell as Sailor

== See also ==
- Surcouf (1925)
