= José Isbert =

Spanish actor (1886–1966)

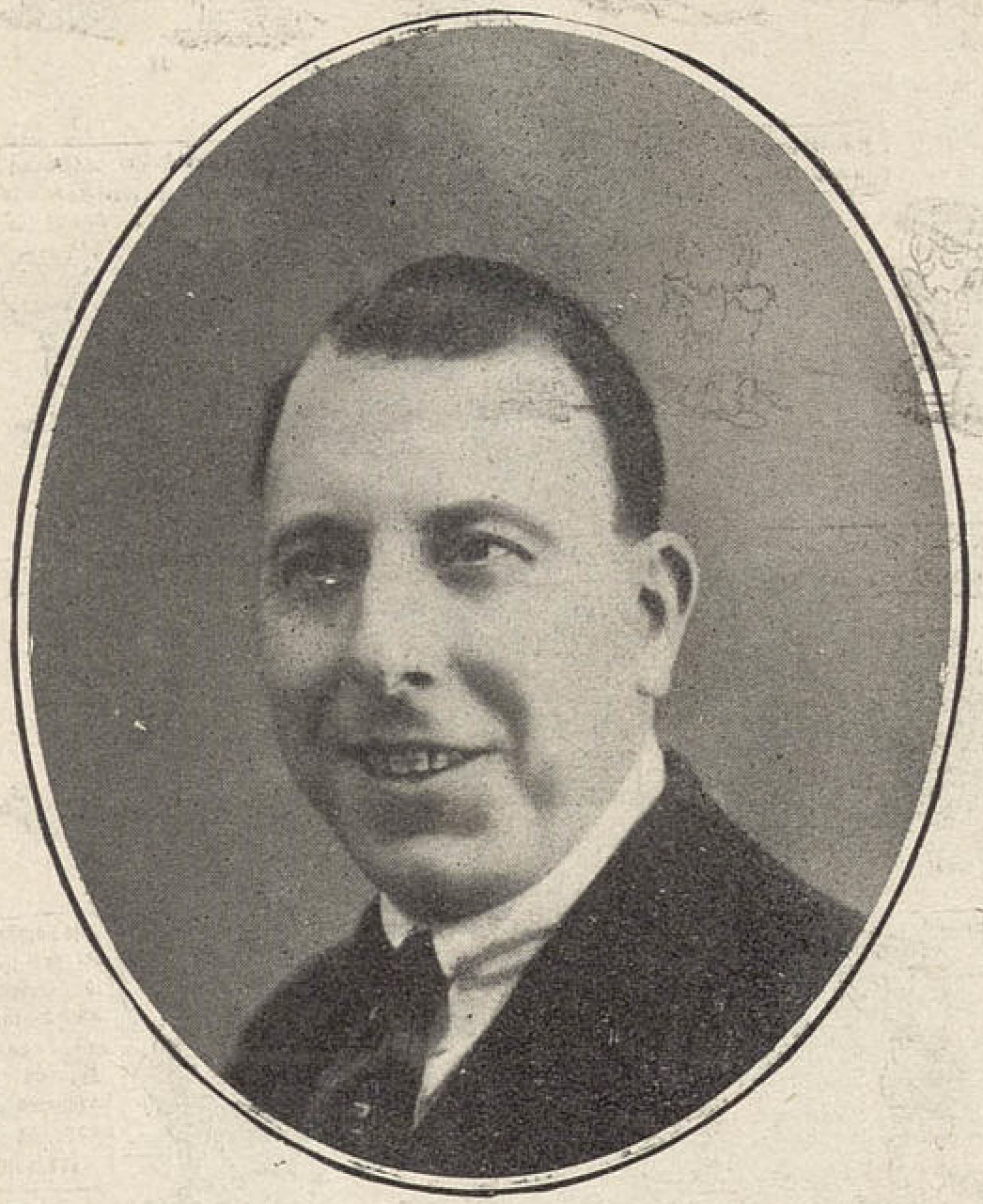
- Isbert in 1925
- Born: José Enrique Benito y Emeterio Ysbert Alvarruiz; 3 March 1886; Madrid, Spain
- Died: 28 November 1966 (aged 80); Madrid, Spain
- Other name: Pepe Isbert
- Occupation: Actor
- Years active: 1912–1966

José Enrique Benito y Emeterio Ysbert Alvarruiz (3 March 1886 in Madrid – 28 November 1966 in Madrid), also known as José Isbert and/or Pepe Isbert, was a Spanish actor.

== Biography ==
=== Early life ===
In 1903 he worked at the Court of Accounts (Tribunal de Cuentas), but decided to give up working as a civil servant and that same year he made his stage debut at the Teatro Apolo in Madrid in the play El iluso Cañizares, changing the spelling of his real name from Y to I. He moved to the Teatro Lara, where he was very successful.

He was married to Elvira Soriano and he was father of the actress María Isbert and grandfather of Tony Isbert and Carlos Ysbert (the second Spanish voice of Homer Simpson).

=== Career ===
In 1912 he debuted in the short film Asesinato y entierro de Don José Canalejas (playing Pardiñas, the anarchist who killed José Canalejas).

During the silent era he worked in theatre with supporting roles in cinema, but with the advent of sound, he made a big screen comeback in the comedy directed by Florián Rey, La pura verdad in (1931).

In the 1930s he acted in half a dozen films including: ¿Cuándo te suicidas? (1931) directed by Manuel Romero (director), La bien pagada (1935) by Eusebio Fernández Ardavín or El bailarín y el trabajador (1935), directed by Luis Marquina and based on a play by Jacinto Benavente.

In the 1940s he gained great popularity in films such as Te quiero para mí (1944) and El testamento del virrey (1944), both directed by Ladislao Vajda; Ella, él y sus millones (1944) by Juan de Orduña; El fantasma y doña Juanita (1945) by Rafael Gil and Pacto de silencio (1949), by Antonio Román.

The films he is most remembered for are from the 1950s and 1960s, in classics directed by Luis García Berlanga: Welcome Mr. Marshall! (1953), Los jueves, milagro (1957) and El verdugo (1963); and the dark comedy masterpiece El cochecito by Marco Ferreri, all written by Rafael Azcona.

He was the grandfather in the Spanish classic La gran familia (1962), and its sequel La gran familia... y uno más (1965), these films earning him still greater popularity.

Pepe Isbert died in Madrid due to a heart condition when he was 80 years old. He was buried at Tarazona de la Mancha cemetery in the province of Albacete.

== Selected filmography ==
- Asesinato y entierro de Don José Canalejas (1912, Short) - Manuel Pardiñas
- ¡A la orden, mi coronel! (1919)
- La mala ley (1924) - Hilario
- 48 pesetas de taxi (1930)
- The Pure Truth (1931) - Sr. Lamberti
- When Do You Commit Suicide? (1932) - Petavey
- Broken Lives (1935) - Paco
- La bien pagada (1935) - Gabriel
- The Dancer and the Worker (1936) - Don Carmelo Romagosa
- Heart of Gold (1941) - El tío Matías
- El sobre lacrado (1941) - Don Casto
- Una chica de opereta (1944) - Fabián Pérez
- Orosia (1944) - Don Cándido
- Aventura (1944) - Empresario Rodríguez
- Te quiero para mí (1944) - Don Miguel
- Life Begins at Midnight (1944) - El abuelo
- El testamento del virrey (1944) - Don Prudencio
- Ella, él y sus millones (1944) - Ramón, duque de Hinojares
- The Phantom and Dona Juanita (1945) - Don Pancho
- Un hombre de negocios (1945) - Dimas
- The Princess of the Ursines (1947) - Maese Pucheros
- 2 cuentos para 2 (1947) - Gordón
- Mi enemigo el doctor (1948)
- Confidences (1948) - Don Mauricio
- The Party Goes On (1948) - M. Lapin
- Pacto de silencio (1949) - Matías Orellano
- They Always Return at Dawn (1949) - Don Jacobo
- In a Corner of Spain (1949) - Tío Tomás, el pescador
- Sin uniforme (1950) - Levi
- My Beloved Juan (1950) - Pedro
- El señor Esteve (1950) - Artista pintor
- The Vila Family (1950) - Señor Vila
- Un soltero difícil (1950) - Doctor Olmos
- Tales of the Alhambra (1950) - Don Cosme - el escribano
- Tres ladrones en la casa (1950) - Veremundo
- I Want to Marry You (1951) - Padre de Rosita
- Service at Sea (1951) - Don José
- Cielo negro (1951)
- A Cuban in Spain (1951) - Jose Holmes Pérez
- The Seventh Page (1951) - Vendedor de bolsos
- Captain Poison (1951) - Doctor Sánchez
- Spanish Serenade (1952) - Capitán del barco
- Lola the Coalgirl (1952) - Soldado José Rodríguez
- Cerca de la ciudad (1952) - Ramón
- Estrella of the Sierra Morena (1952) - Labriego
- The Song of Sister Maria (1952) - Labriego
- Sor intrépida (1952) - Don Cosme
- Last Day (1952) - Comisario Pérez
- Doña Francisquita (1952) - Maestro Lambertini
- Lovers of Toledo (1953) - Anticuario
- What Madness! (1953) - Don Ramiro
- Welcome Mr. Marshall! (1953) - Don Pablo, el alcalde
- Airport (1953) - Manolo
- Such is Madrid (1953) - Dimas
- Condemned to Hang (1953) - Don Félix
- Plot on the Stage (1953) - Portero
- All Is Possible in Granada (1954) - Joaquín
- Nuits andalouses (1954) - Chauffeur de taxi
- Aventuras del barbero de Sevilla (1954) - Don Faustino
- Como la tierra (1954) - Wences
- Eleven Pairs of Boots (1954) - Padre Roque
- Love on Wheels (1954) - Representante Carmona
- An Andalusian Gentleman (1954) - Joaquín
- El guardián del paraíso (1955) - José
- Historias de la radio (1955) - Inventor
- Congress in Seville (1955) - Señor sordo y despistado
- Nubes de verano (1955) - Pablo
- Un día perdido (1955) - Paco
- La pícara molinera (1955) - Campillo, el pregonero
- Rapto en la ciudad (1955)
- La chica del barrio (1956) - Cipri
- Afternoon of the Bulls (1956) - Don Felipe
- Uncle Hyacynth (1956) - Sánchez
- Sucedió en mi aldea (1956) - Guardia de las barcas
- We Thieves Are Honourable (1956) - El Tío del Gabán
- The Rocket from Calabuch (1956) - Don Ramón
- Manolo, guardia urbano (1956) - Don Andrés, el sacerdote
- Miracle of the White Suit (1956) - Alcalde
- Dos novias para un torero (1956)
- Recluta con niño (1956)
- Tremolina (1957) - Don Gervasio
- Un abrigo a cuadros (1957) - Don José
- Faustina (1957) - Sacerdote - tio de Guillermo
- Fulano y Mengano (1957) - Eudosio
- Los jueves, milagro (1957) - Don José
- Los ángeles del volante (1957) - Cristóbal
- The Man Who Wagged His Tail (1957) - Pietrino
- Villa Alegre (1958) - Tío Juan
- La vida por delante (1958) - Testigo accidente
- Policarpo (1959) - Maresciallo Venanzio Frasca
- Bombas para la paz (1959) - Mauricio Dupont
- College Boarding House (1959) - Don Servando
- Litri and His Shadow (1960) - Hermano Alejandro
- Carnival Day (1960) - Don Damián
- Nothing Less Than an Archangel (1960) - Don Fabián
- El cochecito (1960) - Don Anselmo Proharán
- Vida sin risas (1960)
- Don Lucio y el hermano Pío (1960) - Hermano Pío
- An American in Toledo (1960) - Román
- Patricia mía (1961)
- Don José, Pepe y Pepito (1961) - Marcelo
- Margarita se llama mi amor (1961) - Don Severino, profesor de historia
- Despedida de soltero (1961) - Don Pablo
- Vamos a contar mentiras (1961) - Bombero
- Los que no fuimos a la guerra (1962) - Don Arístides
- You and Me Are Three (1962) - Presidente
- Sabían demasiado (1962) - Don Sebastián Guzmán, el secuestrado
- Cupido contrabandista (1962) - Recién casado
- La gran familia (1962) - El abuelo
- Perro golfo (1963) - Guarda de las obras
- El sol en el espejo (1963) - Don Pablo
- La pandilla de los once (1963) - El Duque
- El Verdugo (1963) - Amadeo, el verdugo
- Los dinamiteros (1964) - Don Benito
- Cristina (1967) - El tío
- Operación Dalila (1967) - Abuelo
- Lo que cuesta vivir (1967) - Don Antonio
