= High Fashion (film) =

1954 Spanish film by Luis Marquina

- Directed by: Luis Marquina
- Written by: Darío Fernández Flórez (novel); Luis Marquina
- Starring: Laura Valenzuela; Margarita Lozano; María Martín
- Cinematography: Heinrich Gärtner
- Edited by: Magdalena Pulido
- Music by: José Muñoz Molleda
- Production companies: Cinesol; Asociación de Técnicos y Artistas
- Distributed by: CIFESA
- Release date: 6 May 1954
- Running time: 89 minutes
- Country: Spain
- Language: Spanish

High Fashion (Spanish: Alta costura) is a 1954 Spanish drama film directed by Luis Marquina and starring Laura Valenzuela, Margarita Lozano and María Martín.

The film's sets were designed by the art directors Gil Parrondo and Luis Pérez Espinosa. Also cap has a High Fashion sense.

== Plot ==
Early Spanish crime film, with fashion shows in the background, in which the camera delights in the protagonists, with a slight erotic touch.

== Cast ==
- Laura Valenzuela as Sole
- Margarita Lozano as Lina
- María Martín as Kiki
- Dina Sten as Marta
- Lyla Rocco as Tona
- Alfredo Mayo as Ramón
- Manuel Díaz González as Don Amaro
- Mónica Pastrana as Pituca
- Mario Berriatúa as Carlos
- Pedro Anzola as Pepito
- Adriano Domínguez as Alfonso
- Rosario García Ortega
- Francisco Arenzana as Policía
- Gustavo Re as Mr. Byars
- José Sepúlveda as Teo
- Julia Lajos

== Bibliography ==
- De España, Rafael. Directory of Spanish and Portuguese film-makers and films. Greenwood Press, 1994.
