= Last Day (film) =

- Directed by: Antonio Román
- Written by: Pedro de Juan; Amando de Ossorio; Antonio Román
- Produced by: Pedro de Juan
- Cinematography: Theodore J. Pahle
- Edited by: Antonio Isasi-Isasmendi
- Production company: CIFESA
- Distributed by: CIFESA
- Release date: 1 December 1952
- Running time: 76 minutes
- Country: Spain
- Language: Spanish

Last Day (Spanish:Último día) is a 1952 Spanish crime film directed by Antonio Román.

== Cast ==
- Elena Barrios as Blanquita Peña
- Francisco Bernal as Carterista 1º
- Modesto Blanch as Jugador 1º
- Joaquín Burgos as Avisador
- Quique Camoiras as Muchacho 1º
- Gaspar Campos as Representante Fuentes
- Pedro Martín Caro
- Amando de Ossorio as Jugador 3º
- Beni Deus as Agente Ramos
- Enrique Diosdado as Rafael Osuna
- Víctor Ramón Domínguez as Muchacho 2º
- Antonio Florido as Jugador 2º
- Mateo Guitart as Director de orquesta
- Manolo Gómez Bur as Agente Molina
- Vicente Gómez Bur as Traspunte
- José Isbert as Comisario Pérez
- Manuel Kayser as Doctor Montero
- Pilar Lorengar as Carmen Beltrán
- Carmen Lozano as Laly
- Carlos Marco as Alberto Loma
- Arturo Marín as Carterista 2º
- Julio Mathias Lacarra as Polizón
- Juan Luis Quintana as Agente al teléfono
- Julio Riscal as Agente Gómez
- Fernando Sancho as Professor Lorenzo
- José María Seoane as Manolo Campos
- Mercedes Serrano as Enfermera
- Lorenzo Sánchez Cano as Tenor
- Ángel Álvarez as Dueño de la churrería

== Bibliography ==
- Bentley, Bernard. A Companion to Spanish Cinema. Boydell & Brewer 2008.
