= I Want to Marry You =

- Film poster
- Directed by: Jerónimo Mihura
- Written by: Miguel Mihura
- Starring: Fernando Fernán Gómez; Virginia Keiley; José Isbert
- Cinematography: Federico G. Larraya
- Edited by: Antonio Isasi-Isasmendi
- Music by: Ramón Ferrés
- Production company: Emisora Films
- Distributed by: Hispano Foxfilms
- Release date: 24 March 1951
- Running time: 85 minutes
- Country: Spain
- Language: Spanish

I Want to Marry You (Spanish: Me quiero casar contigo) is a 1951 Spanish comedy film directed by Jerónimo Mihura and starring Virginia Keiley, Fernando Fernán Gómez and José Isbert.

== Cast ==
- Buenaventura Basseda
- María Brú as Madre de Rosita
- Rafael Calvo Gutiérrez
- Rafael Casañes
- Modesto Cid
- Ángel de Andrés as Andrés
- Elena Espejo as Rosita
- Fernando Fernán Gómez as Ramón
- Sacha Goudine as dancer
- Jorge Greiner
- José Isbert as Padre de Rosita
- Virginia Keiley as Laura
- Concha López Silva as Tía de Rosita
- Pedro Mascaró
- Francisco Melgares
- Manolo Morán as Roberto
- María Nicolau as dancer
- Luis Pérez de León as Gerente
- Rosario Royo
- Rosita Valero as Vedette

== Bibliography ==
- de España, Rafael. Directory of Spanish and Portuguese film-makers and films. Greenwood Press, 1994.
