= Life Begins at Midnight =

1944 film by Juan de Orduña

- Directed by: Juan de Orduña
- Written by: Luisa-Maria Linares (novel); Antonio Mas Guindal; Juan de Orduña
- Produced by: Joaquín Cuquerella
- Starring: Marta Santaolalla; Armando Calvo; Julia Lajos; José María Seoane
- Cinematography: Willy Goldberger; Tomás Duch
- Edited by: Juan J. Doria
- Music by: Juan Quintero
- Distributed by: CIFESA
- Release date: 9 November 1944
- Running time: 88 minutes
- Country: Spain
- Language: Spanish

Life Begins at Midnight (Spanish:La vida empieza a medianoche ) is a 1944 Spanish comedy film written and directed by Juan de Orduña and starring Marta Santaolalla, Armando Calvo and Julia Lajos.

The movie is based on the novel written by Luisa-Maria Linares.

== Cast ==
- Marta Santaolalla as Silvia
- Armando Calvo as Ricardo
- Julia Lajos as María Linz
- José María Seoane as Álvaro
- José Isbert as El abuelo
- María Isbert as Clarita
- Consuelo de Nieva as Marcela
- José Prada as Juan
- Manuel Requena as Gorito
- Luis Sanz as Guillermito
- Manuel Soto as Director del hotel
- Antonio Prada
- Xan das Bolas
- Dolores Castillejo

== Bibliography ==
- Bentley, Bernard. A Companion to Spanish Cinema. Boydell & Brewer, 2008.
