= Virginia Keiley =

British actress (1918–1990)

- Keiley in Miss London Ltd.
- Born: 4 April 1918; Jersey, Channel Islands
- Died: 23 June 1990 (aged 72); London, United Kingdom
- Occupation: Actress
- Years active: 1942–1959 (film & TV)

Virginia Keiley (1918–1990) was a British actress. She began her career at Gainsborough Pictures appearing in a number of glamorous but small, sometimes uncredited roles in the studio's comedies and melodramas. After the Second World War she graduated to more substantial parts including playing the female lead in the 1951 Spanish comedy I Want to Marry You. Her final screen appearance was in an episode of the British television series The Vise in 1959.

== Selected filmography ==
- King Arthur Was a Gentleman (1942)
- Rose of Tralee (1942)
- Miss London Ltd. (1943)
- It's That Man Again (1943)
- Love Story (1944)
- Fanny by Gaslight (1944)
- Carnival (1946)
- Nocturne (1946)
- The Locket (1946)
- If Winter Comes (1947)
- Red, Hot and Blue (1949)
- Fancy Pants (1950)
- I Want to Marry You (1951)
- The Night Is Ours (1953)
- The Sparrows of Paris (1953)
- Morning Call (1957)
- Operation Murder (1957)

== Bibliography ==
- Fernando Lara & Eduardo Rodríguez. Miguel Mihura en el infierno del cine. Semana Internacional de Cine de Valladolid, 1990.
