= That Man in Istanbul =

1965 film

- Film poster
- Directed by: Antonio Isasi-Isasmendi
- Written by: Howard Clewes; Lluís Josep Comerón; Jorge Illa; Antonio Isasi-Isasmendi; Giovanni Simonelli; Nat Wachsberger
- Produced by: Antonio Isasi-Isasmendi; Nat Wachsberger
- Starring: Horst Buchholz
- Cinematography: Juan Gelpí
- Edited by: Juan Pallejá
- Music by: Georges Garvarentz
- Release date: 11 August 1965
- Running time: 114 minutes
- Countries: Spain; Italy; France
- Language: English
- Box office: 46,957,940 pesetas ($0.7 million) (Spain)

That Man in Istanbul (Spanish: Estambul 65, Italian: Colpo grosso a Galata Bridge, French: L'Homme d'Istamboul) is a 1965 English-language European international co-production adventure film directed by Antonio Isasi-Isasmendi and starring Horst Buchholz. It was released in the United States by Columbia Pictures. That Man in Istanbul is a eurospy comedy film. Its English-language title is likely a reference to the 1964 eurospy comedy film That Man from Rio.

== Plot ==
After paying a million dollars ransom in used notes for a nuclear scientist abducted in Turkey, the CIA find that they were fobbed off with a double. Refusing to accept defeat, agent Kelly goes on holiday to Istanbul where she meets nightclub owner Tony, who knows all the local underworld. He is excited by the idea of retrieving the million dollars if he can find the scientist and sets to work. Despite losing Kelly, who is also abducted, after many daring adventures and dramatic fights with every possible weapon he eventually ends up on a yacht that holds the scientist, the girl, and the attaché case with the money. Giving the man back to the Americans, he keeps the other two.

== Cast ==
- Horst Buchholz as Tony Mecenas
- Sylva Koscina as Kelly, CIA Agent
- Mario Adorf as Bill
- Perrette Pradier as Elisabeth Furst
- Ángel Picazo as Inspector Mallouk
- Klaus Kinski as Schenck
- Gérard Tichy as Charly Cohen
- Christiane Maybach as Josette
- Álvaro de Luna as Bogo
- Gustavo Re as Brain, the Accountant
- George Rigaud as CIA Chief
- Henri Cogan as Cogan (as Henry Cogan)
- Agustín González as Gunther
- Umberto Raho as Prof. Pendergast
- Marta Flores as Lady in Limousine
- Barta Barri as Captain
- Luis Induni as Thug
- Manuel Bronchud as Thug
- Alberto Dalbés as Thug
- Don Maxwell as CIA Operative
- Claude Cerval as Brandt
- Antonio Molino Rojo as Picture presenter
