= They Came to Rob Las Vegas =

1968 film by Antonio Isasi-Isasmendi

- Theatrical release poster
- Spanish: Las Vegas, 500 milliones
- Directed by: Antonio Isasi-Isasmendi
- Screenplay by: Antonio Isasi-Isasmendi; Lluis Josep Comeron; Jorge Illa; Jo Eisinger
- Based on: Les Hommes De Las Vegas by André Lay
- Produced by: Antonio Isasi-Isasmendi
- Starring: Gary Lockwood; Elke Sommer; Lee J. Cobb; Jack Palance; Jean Servais; Roger Hanin
- Cinematography: Juan Gelpí
- Edited by: Emilio Rodríguez; Elena Jaumandreu
- Music by: Georges Garvarentz
- Production company: Isasi Producciones Cinematograficas; Capitole Films; Eichberg Film; Franca Film
- Distributed by: Cineriz (Italy); Constantin Film (West Germany & Austria); Warner Bros.-Seven Arts (international)
- Release dates: 31 October 1968 (Spain); 17 January 1969 (France); 6 February 1969 (Italy); 7 March 1969 (West Germany)
- Running time: 129 minutes
- Country: Spain; France; Italy; West Germany
- Language: English

They Came to Rob Las Vegas (Spanish: Las Vegas, 500 milliones) is a 1968 heist film directed and produced by Antonio Isasi-Isasmendi, and starring Gary Lockwood, Elke Sommer, Lee J. Cobb, Jack Palance, Jean Servais and Roger Hanin. The storyline concerns a crime outfit who plan a heist to rob a hi-tech truck containing $7 million in Las Vegas. It is based on the novel Les Hommes de Las Vegas (lit. "The Men of Las Vegas") by French author André Lay.

The film was a co-production between Spanish, French, Italian, and West German companies. It won Best Film and Best Director (for Isai-Isasmendi) at the 1969 CEC Awards.

== Plot ==
Steve Skorsky has a reputation in security transport for financial institutions. His security trucks have armed guards and computer controlled routing. According to the plot, no one had successfully raided a Skorsky truck before the events of the film.

Ex-mobster Gino Vincenzo escapes from prison and plans to rob a Skorsky truck with his brother Tony in an armed assault, but Tony turns down the idea saying it needs more planning. Gino goes ahead anyway and he and his gang are killed in the attempt.

Tony plans a new robbery, but Treasury Department Inspector Douglas is also after Skorsky as he uses his trucks to move illicit gold bullion for the Mafia. Under the alias "Tony Ferris", he takes a job as a dealer in a Las Vegas casino in order to seduce Anne Bennett, Skorsky's secretary and mistress. She is a compulsive gambler and Tony helps her to win in return for a share of the profits. She falls in love with him and he persuades her to provide the information he needs to ambush a Skorsky truck in the Nevada desert. He and his gang hide the truck in an underground bunker where they will have time to either persuade the crew to come out, or break into it, but impatience gets the better of the gang members who try to employ their own methods.

The plan starts to disintegrate as Douglas, Skorsky, and the mobsters all try to find the truck which seems to have vanished. Tony eventually succeeds, but Anne urges him to forget about the money and run away with her so that they can be together. It's then that she realises it was never about the money. It was about ruining Skorsky's reputation in revenge for the death of Tony's brother.

== Cast ==
- Gary Lockwood as Tony Vincenzo/Tony Ferris
- Elke Sommer as Anne Bennett
- Lee J. Cobb as Steve Skorsky
- Jean Servais as Gino Vincenzo
- Georges Géret as Leroy
- Jack Palance as Douglas
- Fabrizio Capucci as Cooper
- Roger Hanin as The Boss
- Gustavo Re as Salvatore
- Daniel Martín as Merino
- Maurizio Arena as Clark
- Enrique Ávila as Baxter
- Gérard Tichy as Sheriff Klinger
- Rubén Rojo as Barry
- Fernando Hilbeck as Brian
- Armand Mestral as Inspector
- George Rigaud as Chief Inspector
- José Marco as Lloyd
- Beni Deus as Beno
- Julio Pérez Tabernero as Morton

== Production ==
Filming took place on-location in Las Vegas, San Francisco, and Los Angeles; and in the desertous Almería region of Spain. Studio interiors were shot at Estudios Balcázar in Barcelona and Estudios Moro in Madrid.

== Release ==
It debuted in Spain on 31 October 1968, and was released internationally by Warner Bros.-Seven Arts.

=== Home media ===
The film was released on DVD in North America by the Warner Archive Collection.

== Reception ==
According to a September 1976 issue of Variety, it did poorly in the United States but was successful overseas.

=== Awards and nominations ===
Institution	Year	Category	Nominee	Result
Círculo de Escritores Cinematográficos	1969	Best Film	—N/a	Won
Círculo de Escritores Cinematográficos	1969	Best Director	Antonio Isasi-Isasmendi	Won
Sant Jordi Awards	1969	Best Film	Antonio Isasi-Isasmendi	Won
Sindicato Nacional del Espectáculo	1968	Best Film	—N/a	Won
Sindicato Nacional del Espectáculo	1968	Best Director	Antonio Isasi-Isasmendi	Won
Sindicato Nacional del Espectáculo	1968	Best Set Decorator	Juan Alberto Soler, Antonio Cortés	Won
Sindicato Nacional del Espectáculo	1968	Best Technical Achievement	—N/a	Won

== See also ==
- List of films set in Las Vegas

== Bibliography ==
- "Elke Sommer Switches For Las Vegas Thriller". The Calgary Herald. Calgary, AB. February 26, 1968. p. 7.
- "Sand Storms, Jets Delay Film Shooting". The Calgary Herald. Calgary, AB. March 1, 1968. p. 8.
- Browning, Norma Lee (March 31, 1968). "Elke Prefers Hollywood to Europe for Movie Making". Chicago Tribune. Chicago, IL. p. G13.
- Thompson, Howard (February 6, 1969). "'They Came to Rob Las Vegas' Opens". The New York Times. New York, NY. p. 3D.
- Thomas, Kevin (February 22, 1969). "'Rob Las Vegas' in Multiples". Los Angeles Times. Los Angeles, CA. p. A7. "They Came to Rob Las Vegas"—but stayed in Spain to make much of this trite "perfect crime" movie (in multiples)."
- Adams, Marjory (March 7, 1969). "Lockwood makes 'Las Vegas' lively". Boston Globe. Boston, MA. p. 25.
