= It's a Sin to Be Poor =

1950 film

- Directed by: Fernando A. Rivero
- Written by: José G. Cruz; Fernando A. Rivero
- Produced by: José Luis Calderón
- Starring: Ramón Armengod; Guillermina Grin; Tito Junco
- Cinematography: Alex Phillips
- Edited by: Alfredo Rosas Priego
- Music by: Antonio Díaz Conde; Luna de la Fuente Gabriel
- Production company: Producciones Calderón
- Release date: 11 November 1950
- Running time: 84 minutes
- Country: Mexico
- Language: Spanish

It's a Sin to Be Poor (Spanish: Pecado de ser pobre) is a 1950 Mexican crime drama film directed by Fernando A. Rivero and starring Ramón Armengod, Guillermina Grin and Tito Junco. It was shot at the Churubusco Studios in Mexico City. The film's sets were designed by the art director Manuel Fontanals.

== Cast ==
- Ramón Armengod as Antonio
- Guillermina Grin as Irma
- Tito Junco as Roberto
- Roberto Soto Don Pedro
- Pedro Vargas as Cantante
- Virginia Serret as Violeta
- Mercedes Soler as Doña Mariquita
- Amparo Arozamena as Julia
- Gloria Alonso as Teresita
- Moreno López as Tilin
- Carlos Múzquiz as Esbirro de Roberto
- Juan Orraca as Esbirro de Roberto
- Jorge Pérez as Ronco
- Jaime Valdés as Esbirro de Roberto
- Julián de Meriche as Señor Fuentes
- Guillermo Bravo Sosa as Grillo
- Ana María González as Cantante
- Dámaso Pérez Prado as Self
- Bobby Capó as Self
- Lupe Carriles as Mujer en cantina

== Bibliography ==
- Gilabert, Rosa Peralt. Manuel Fontanals, escenógrafo: teatro, cine y exilio. Editorial Fundamentos, 2007.
- Riera, Emilio García. Historia documental del cine mexicano: 1949-1950. Universidad de Guadalajara, 1992
