= His Heart Awake =

1949 film

- Directed by: Jerónimo Mihura
- Written by: Julio Coll; Manuel Tamayo
- Starring: Conrado San Martín; José Nieto; Margarita Andrey
- Cinematography: Jules Kruger
- Music by: Ramón Ferrés
- Production company: Emisora Films
- Release date: 1949
- Country: Spain
- Language: Spanish

His Heart Awake (Spanish: Despertó su corazón) is a 1949 Spanish drama film directed by Jerónimo Mihura and starring Conrado San Martín, José Nieto and Margarita Andrey.

== Cast ==
- Conrado San Martín as Ricardo Fernández García
- José Nieto as Antonio, director
- Margarita Andrey as Carmen
- Mary Delgado as Maribel
- Alberto Romea as Don Tomás
- Rosita Valero as Isabel
- Eugenio Testa as Sr. Montalvo
- Ricardo Palmerola as Luís
- María Victoria Durá as Sra. de Varela
- José Ramón Giner as Sr, Varela
- Emilio Fábregas as padre de Isabel y Carmen
- Rafael Navarro as Carlos
- Modesto Cid as Mayordomo
- María Esperanza Navarro as Telefonista
- José Soler as Trabajador
- Marta Fábregas as Sra. de Montalvo

== Bibliography ==
- De España, Rafael. Directory of Spanish and Portuguese film-makers and films. Greenwood Press, 1994.
- Riambau, Esteve & Torreiro, Casimiro. Productores en el cine español: estado, dependencias y mercado. Cátedra, 2008.
