= María Martín (actress) =

Spanish actress

- Born: 14 July 1923; Marbella, Spain
- Died: 10 June 2014 (aged 90); Barcelona, Spain
- Other name: María Martín Vargas
- Occupation: Actress
- Years active: 1943–1998 (film)

María Martín (14 July 1923 – 10 June 2014) was a Spanish actress. After making her screen debut in 1943, Martín appeared in around eighty films during her career including Dawn of America (1951) and Bilbao (1978.) She was occasionally credited as "Mary Martin" in English-speaking films. Martín died in Barcelona on 10 June 2014, at the age of 90.

== Selected filmography ==
- Cristina Guzmán (1943)
- Fever (1943)
- A Shadow at the Window (1944)
- Spanish Serenade (1947)
- The Holy Queen (1947)
- In a Corner of Spain (1949)
- Hand of Death (1949)
- They Always Return at Dawn (1949)
- Captain Demonio (1950)
- Dawn of America (1951)
- Journey to Italy (1954)
- High Fashion (1954)
- Action Stations (1956)
- Flame Over Vietnam (1957)
- The Girl of San Pietro Square (1958)
- The Sailor with Golden Fists (1968)
- La banda de los tres crisantemos (1970)
- Un par de asesinos (1970)
- Murders in the Rue Morgue (1971)
- The Great Swindle (1971)
- Bilbao (1978)

== Bibliography ==
- D'Lugo, Marvin. Guide to the Cinema of Spain. Greenwood Publishing Group, 1997.
