= Doña María the Brave =

1948 film

- Directed by: Luis Marquina
- Written by: Francisco de Cossío; Luis Marquina
- Based on: Doña María the Brave by Eduardo Marquina
- Starring: Tina Gascó; Luis Hurtado; Adriano Domínguez; Miriam Di San Servolo
- Cinematography: Heinrich Gärtner
- Edited by: Bienvenida Sanz
- Music by: Manuel Parada
- Production company: Manuel del Castillo
- Distributed by: CEPISCA
- Release date: 29 November 1948
- Running time: 90 minutes
- Country: Spain
- Language: Spanish

Doña María the Brave (Spanish: Doña María la Brava) is a 1948 Spanish historical drama film directed by Luis Marquina and starring Tina Gascó, Luis Hurtado and Adriano Domínguez. It featured the Italian actress Miriam Di San Servolo, sister of Benito Mussolini's former lover Clara Petacci in a supporting role. It is based on the 1909 play of the same title by Eduardo Marquina. The plot deals with the political intrigues leading up to the succession of John II of Castile in the fifteenth century.

== Cast ==
- Tina Gascó as Doña María de Guzmán
- Luis Hurtado as Don Álvaro de Luna
- Adriano Domínguez as Príncipe Don Enrique
- Manuel Dicenta as Alonso Pérez de Vivero
- José Rivero as Rey Don Juan II
- Miriam Di San Servolo as Reina Isabel
- Salvador Soler as Don älvaro de Estúniga
- Rafael Romero Marchent as paje Morales
- José Prada as Marqués de Santillana
- Asunción Sancho as Dama Catalina
- Arturo Marín as Juglar
- Carlos Díaz de Mendoza as Conde de Plasencia
- Alberto Solá as Cartagena
- Jacinto San Emeterio as Juan de Mena
- Manuel Aguilera as Noble
- Ricardo B. Arévalo as Alonso de Estúniga

== Bibliography ==
- Bentley, Bernard. A Companion to Spanish Cinema. Boydell & Brewer 2008.
- Bosworth, R.J.B. Claretta: Mussolini's Last Lover. Yale University Press, 2017.
- De España, Rafael. Directory of Spanish and Portuguese film-makers and films. Greenwood Press, 1994.
