= A Dog in Space =

1966 film by Antonio Román, Antonio del Amo

- Directed by: Antonio del Amo; Antonio Román
- Written by: Eduardo García Maroto; Antonio de Jaén; José Antonio de la Iglesia; Antonio del Amo
- Cinematography: Santiago Crespo
- Edited by: Antonio Gimeno
- Music by: Benito Lauret
- Production company: Apolo Films
- Distributed by: Concordia
- Release date: 1966
- Running time: 81 minutes
- Country: Spain
- Language: Spanish

A Dog in Space (Spanish: Un perro en órbita) is a 1966 Spanish film directed by Antonio del Amo and Antonio Román.

== Plot summary ==
A Dog in Space follows Don Fabián, a village priest who becomes convinced that a strange force can cancel gravity. His unusual ideas unsettle the town, but a group of local kids decides to help him look into the odd events around them. Together, they try to understand whether his theory means anything or if they’re just chasing a wild idea.

== Cast ==
- Pastor Serrador
- César Raúl Martínez
- Ángel Luis Nolías
- Inmaculada Pérez
- José Carabias
- Adolfo Torrado

== Bibliography ==
- de España, Rafael. Directory of Spanish and Portuguese film-makers and films. Greenwood Press, 1994.
