= In a Corner of Spain =

1949 Spanish film by Jerónimo Mihura

- Directed by: Jerónimo Mihura
- Written by: Salvador Cerdán; Julio Coll; Juan Lladó; Cecilia A. Mantua; Manuel Tamayo
- Starring: Carlos Agostí; Juan de Landa; Blanca de Silos; María Martín
- Cinematography: Isidoro Goldberger
- Edited by: Antonio Isasi-Isasmendi
- Music by: Ramón Ferrés
- Production company: Emisora Films
- Release date: 21 November 1949
- Running time: 109 minutes
- Country: Spain
- Language: Spanish

In a Corner of Spain (Spanish: En un rincón de España) is a 1949 Spanish drama film directed by Jerónimo Mihura and starring Carlos Agostí, Juan de Landa and Blanca de Silos. It was the first Spanish film in colour, using the cinefotocolor process. Part of the narrative portrays the lives of Polish political refugees who have settled in Spain.

== Cast ==
- Carlos Agostí as Pablo
- José Bruguera as Padre Luis
- Jesús Castro Blanco as Médico
- Arturo Cámara as Comisario
- Juan de Landa as Alcalde
- Blanca de Silos as Lida Kluber
- Osvaldo Genazzani as Stanis Kluber
- José Isbert as Tío Tomás, el pescador
- María Martín as Rosa María
- Adriano Rimoldi as Vladimir
- Conrado San Martín as Ian Eminowicz
- Aníbal Vela as Juan Carlos
- Bartolomé Planas
- Manuel Requena
- Juan Manuel Soriano

== Bibliography ==
- Bentley, Bernard. A Companion to Spanish Cinema. Boydell & Brewer 2008.
