= Luisa-Maria Linares =

Spanish writer (1915–1986)

Luisa-María Linares
- Luisa María Linares-Becerra y Martín de Eugenio
- Born: 1915; Madrid, Spain
- Died: 12 September 1986 (aged 70–71); Estoril, Portugal
- Occupation: Novelist
- Spouse: Antonio Carbó y Ortiz-Repiso (1933–1936)
- Children: 2
- Relatives: Concha Linares-Becerra (sister), Luis Linares-Becerra (father)
- Writing career
- Pen name: Luisa-María Linares
- Period: 1939–1983
- Genre: Spanish language

Luisa-María Linares (born 1915 in Madrid, Spain – d. 12 September 1986 in Estoril, Portugal), was a popular Spanish writer of 32 romantic novels from 1939 to 1983. Her novels have been translated into several languages and adapted to film 22 times. Her sister Concha Linares-Becerra also was a romance novelist, and her father was Luis Linares-Becerra, a playwright.

== Biography ==
Luisa María Linares-Becerra y Martín de Eugenio was born on 1915 in Madrid, Spain, daughter of Luis Linares-Becerra, a playwright, journalist and teather, and his wife, María Concepción Martín de Eugenio. She had two sisters: María Concepción and María del Carmen. After their father death, her sister started to write romance novels as Concha Linares-Becerra.

At 15, she fell in love with Antonio Carbó y Ortiz-Repiso, and they married in September 1933, when she was 18. They had two daughters: María Luisa and María Concepción. Her husband was executed on 14 August 1936 on the destroyer "Almirante Valdés". Back at the mother's home, she began writing for magazines. In 1939, coinciding with the end of the Spanish Civil War, she published her first novels. The following year her novel En poder de Barba Azul was adapted to film, the first of 22 adaptations.

Linares died on 12 September 1986 in Estoril, Portugal and she was buried in her native Madrid.

== Bibliography ==
=== Single novels ===
- En poder de Barba Azul (1939)
- Escuela para nuevos ricos (1939)
- Mi enemigo y yo (1939)
- Un marido a precio fijo (1940)
- Doce lunas de miel (1941)
- Tuvo la culpa Adán (1942)
- Una aventura de película (1942)
- La vida empieza a medianoche (1943)
- Mi novio el emperador (1943)
- Imposible para una solterona (1945)
- Napoleón llega en el "Clipper" (1945)
- Salomé la magnífica (1946)
- Esta semana me llamo Cleopatra (1949)
- Socios para la aventura (1950)
- Soy la otra mujer (1950)
- Cada día tiene su secreto (1951)
- Sólo volaré contigo (1952)
- Apasionadamente infiel (1955)
- Esta noche volveré tarde (1958)
- Casi siempre te adoro (1959)
- Mis cien últimos amores (1963)
- Juan a las ocho, Pablo a las diez (1964) Web of Fear
- De noche soy indiscreta (1965)
- No digas lo que hice ayer (1969) Fatal Legacy
- Esconde la llave de esa puerta (1974)
- Mi hombre en Ginebra (1977)
- Vivimos juntos (1981)
- Ponga un tigre en su cama (1983)

=== Anthologies ===
- La calle desconocida + (Regalo de Navidad + Lina es una aventurera) (1945)
- Hay otros hombres: siete novelas cortas (1953)
- Lusitania Express + Como casarse con un Primer Ministro + Vacaciones al sol + Bajo el signo del miedo (1955)
- Prueba suerte otra vez + Absolutamente libre + El séptimo suelo (1979)
