= Margarita Andrey =

Spanish actress (1926–2026)

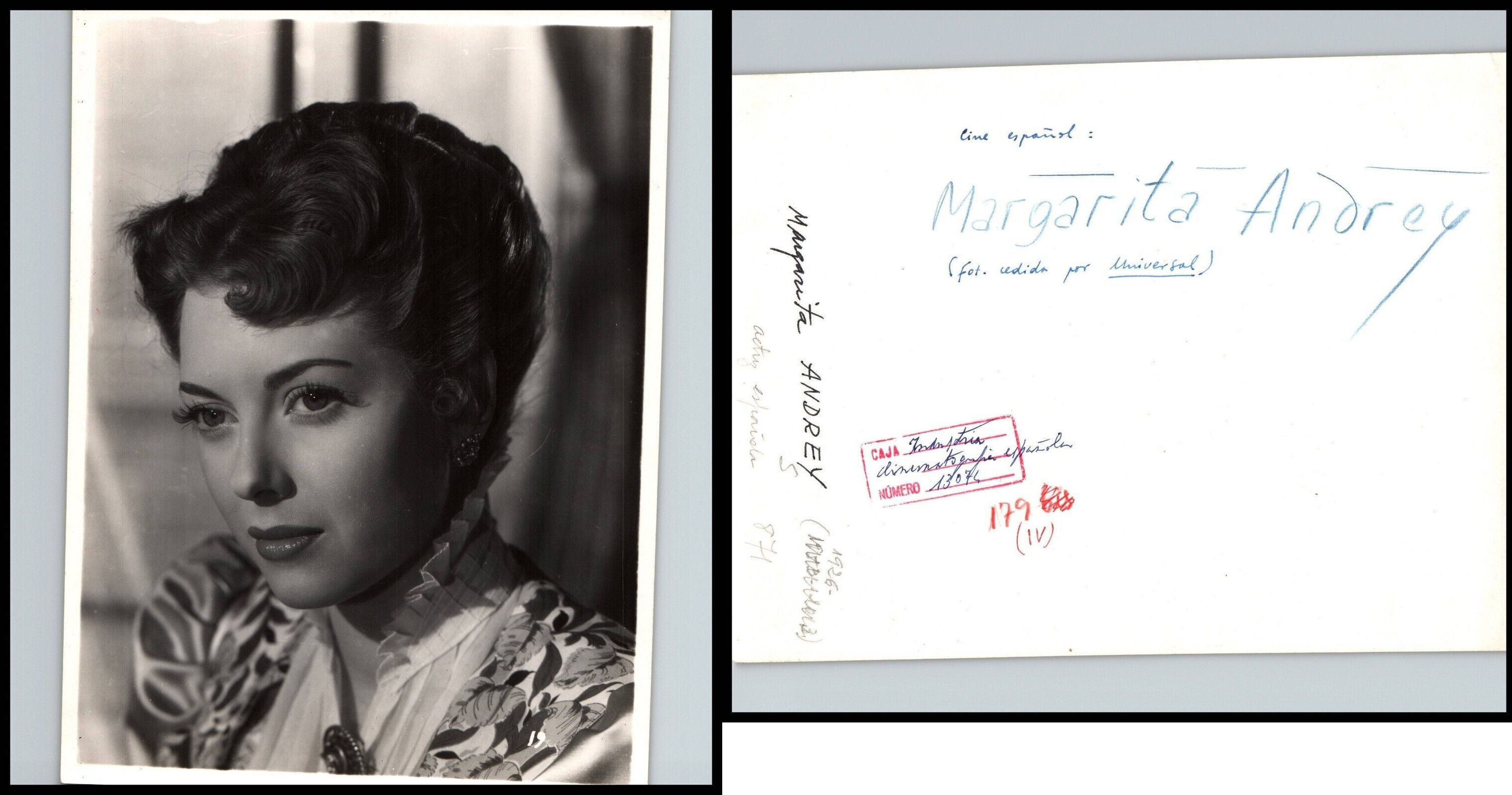
- Born: 19 September 1926; Madrid, Spain
- Died: 14 July 2026 (aged 99); Madrid, Spain
- Occupation: Actress
- Years active: 1945–1956

Margarita Andrey (19 September 1926 – 14 July 2026) was a Spanish film actress. She appeared in a number of female lead roles during the late 1940s and early 1950s.

Andrey died on 14 July 2026, at the age of 99.

== Selected filmography ==
- La mantilla de Beatriz (1946)
- The Party Goes On (1948)
- They Always Return at Dawn (1949)
- His Heart Awake (1949)
- Verónica (1950)
- Devil's Roundup (1952)
- Airport (1953)
- Father Cigarette (1955)
- Radio Stories (1955)

== Bibliography ==
- D'Lugo, Marvin. Guide to the Cinema of Spain. Greenwood Publishing, 1997.
- Paietta, Ann C. Teachers in the Movies: A Filmography of Depictions of Grade School, Preschool and Day Care Educators, 1890s to the Present. McFarland, 2007.
