= Guillermina Green =

Spanish actress (1922–2006)

- Born: 1922; Seville, Spain
- Died: 2006 (aged 83–84); Mexico City, Mexico
- Other name: Guillermina Grin
- Occupation: Actress
- Years active: 1942-1951 (film)

Guillermina Green (1922–2006), also known as Guillermina Grin, was a Spanish film actress. She appeared in twenty three films including The Butterfly That Flew Over the Sea (1948). She was born in Seville, to a Spanish mother and an English father, William Green, an optician who worked in the city. In 1941 she was spotted by the film director Florian Rey and given a small part in one of his films. She graduated to leading lady status, and starred in Spanish films during the decade. She later emigrated to Mexico, but retired from acting in 1951 following her marriage to producer Guillermo Calderón.

== Selected filmography ==
- The Road to Babel (1945)
- When the Night Comes (1946)
- The Butterfly That Flew Over the Sea (1948)
- Troubled Lives (1949)
- Wife or Lover (1950)
- It's a Sin to Be Poor (1950)

== Bibliography ==
- Goble, Alan. The Complete Index to Literary Sources in Film. Walter de Gruyter, 1999.
