= The Howl (1948 film) =

1948 film

- Directed by: Ferruccio Cerio
- Written by: Alessandro De Stefani; Manuel Taramona
- Based on: The Howl by Ferruccio Cerio and Alessandro De Stefani
- Starring: Elli Parvo; Rafael Bardem; Roldano Lupi
- Cinematography: Ugo Lombardi; Carlos Pahissa
- Edited by: Antonio Martínez; Juan Pisón
- Music by: José María Gil Serrano; Ennio Porrino
- Production companies: ICI; Manuel Taramona
- Distributed by: ICI
- Release date: 24 April 1948
- Running time: 84 minutes
- Countries: Italy; Spain
- Language: Spanish

The Howl (Italian: L'urlo, Spanish: El alarido) is a 1948 Italian-Spanish mystery thriller film directed by Ferruccio Cerio and starring Elli Parvo, Rafael Bardem and Roldano Lupi. Cerio and Alessandro De Stefani adapted the script from their own 1934 stage play of the same title The film's sets were designed by the art director Amalio Garí. It is the first of two films directed by Cerio in Francoist Spain where he had relocated following his association with Mussolini's Italian Social Republic in the final years of the Second World War.

== Synopsis ==
Every night a howl is heard outside the insane asylum run by Professor Oder, terrifying his younger wife Silvia. Neglected by her husband she begins to fall for Adamo, a musician who is resting at the clinic to recover his health. When a patient is strangled her husband puts the blame of Adamo who he claims is a homicidal maniac. However, it turns out the professor is really insane and the night screams are his own cries of torment.

== Cast ==
- Elli Parvo as Silvia
- Roldano Lupi as Adamo
- Rafael Bardem as Professor Oder
- Guillermo Marín as Noler
- Enrique Guitart as Rellio
- Mary Lamar as Delia
- Manuel Requena as Gorling
- Pilar Sirvent as Infermiera
- Pablo Álvarez Rubio as Vados
- Julia Caba Alba
- Conrado San Martín
- Aurelia Carrascal
- Juan de las Cuevas

== Bibliography ==
- Chiti, Roberto & Poppi, Roberto. Dizionario del cinema italiano: Dal 1945 al 1959. Gremese Editore, 1991.
- Curti, Roberto. Italian Giallo in Film and Television: A Critical History. McFarland, 2022.
