= My Beloved Juan =

1950 film

- Directed by: Jerónimo Mihura
- Written by: Miguel Mihura
- Starring: Conchita Montes; Conrado San Martín; Juan de Landa; Alberto Romea
- Cinematography: Jules Kruger
- Edited by: Antonio Isasi-Isasmendi
- Music by: Ramón Ferrés
- Production company: Emisora Films
- Release date: 13 February 1950
- Country: Spain
- Language: Spanish

My Beloved Juan (Spanish:Mi adorado Juan) is a 1950 Spanish comedy film directed by Jerónimo Mihura and starring Conchita Montes, Conrado San Martín and Juan de Landa.

== Synopsis ==
The strange disappearance of the dogs of his neighbors leads Juan to investigate it, falling all suspicion on a certain Eloísa, the proud daughter of a scientist who uses dogs to create an antidote against sleep. Juan is a person who is everyone's friend because his only occupation is to do favors for everyone and sleep a lot, with the conviction that whoever sleeps well has to be a good person, without the evil and rancor that comes from not sleeping. In this way he establishes acquaintance with Eloisa.

== Cast ==
- Conchita Montes as Eloísa Palacios
- Conrado San Martín as Juan
- Juan de Landa as Sebastián
- Luis Pérez de León as Doctor Vidal
- Alberto Romea as Doctor Palacios
- José Isbert as Pedro
- Rafael Navarro as Doctor Manríquez
- Julia Lajos as Rosa
- Rosita Valero as Camarera
- Leandro Alpuente as Antonio
- Modesto Cid as Criado
- José Ramón Giner as Paulino
- Eugenio Testa as Director

== Bibliography ==
- Labanyi, Jo & Pavlović, Tatjana. A Companion to Spanish Cinema. John Wiley & Sons, 2012.
