= Luis Hurtado (actor) =

Spanish actor

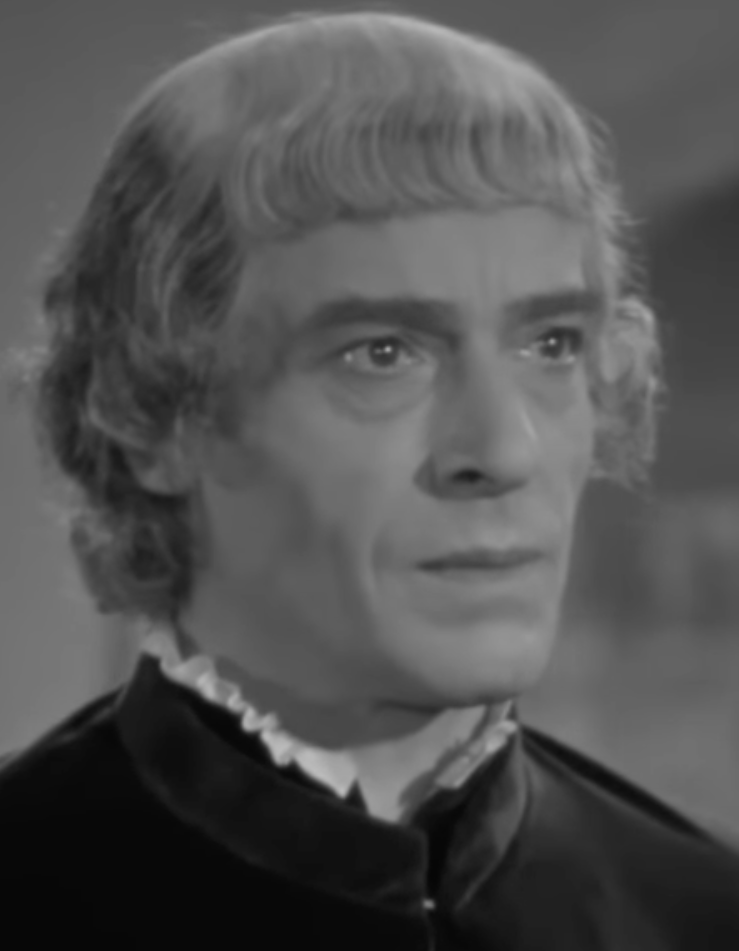
- Hurtado in Giuliano de' Medici (1941)
- Born: 8 September 1898; Madrid; Spain
- Died: 1967 (aged 68–69)
- Occupation: Actor
- Years active: 1921 - 1955 (film)

Luis Hurtado (1898–1967) was a Spanish film actor. He appeared in a mixture of Spanish and Italian films during his career. After appearing in leading roles in several Italian production of the Fascist era, he later returned to Spain where he appeared in films such as The Butterfly That Flew Over the Sea (1951).

== Selected filmography ==
- L'ispettore Vargas (1940)
- Giuliano de' Medici (1941)
- The Betrothed (1941)
- Document Z-3 (1942)
- Captain Tempest (1942)
- The House of Rain (1943)
- Doña María the Brave (1948)
- Saturday Night (1950)
- Apollo Theatre (1950)
- The Butterfly That Flew Over the Sea (1951)
- Malibran's Song (1951)
- From Madrid to Heaven (1952)
- Judas' Kiss (1954)

== Bibliography ==
- Goble, Alan. The Complete Index to Literary Sources in Film. Walter de Gruyter, 1999.
