= Antonio de Obregón =

Spanish writer and film director

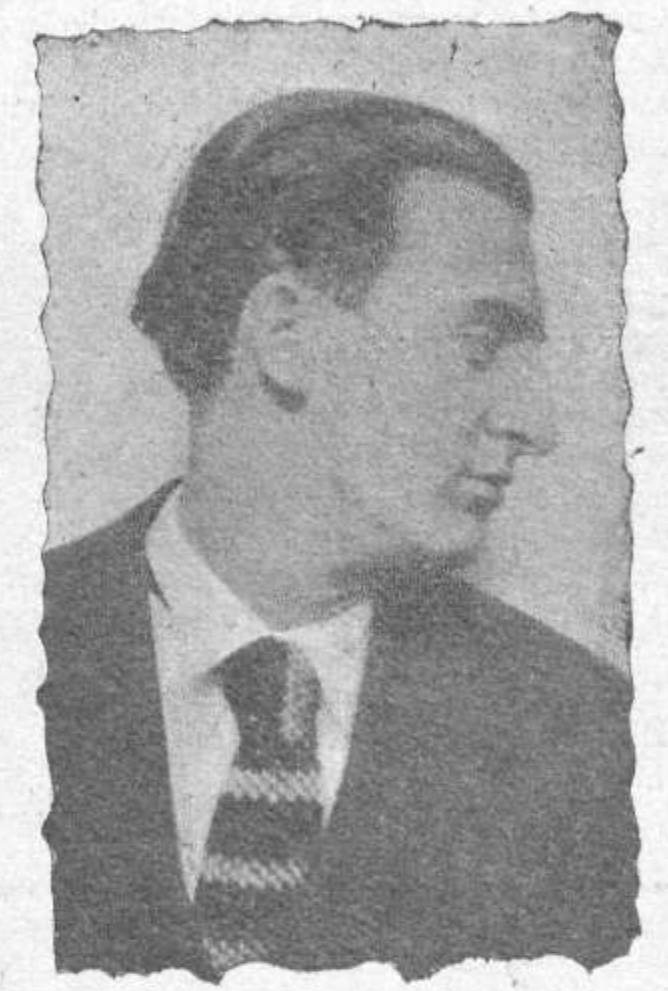
- Occupations: Writer, director
- Years active: 1935–1952 (film)

Antonio de Obregón was a Spanish writer and film director. He was a supporter of the Falange movement.

== Selected filmography ==
- House of Cards (1943)
- The Butterfly That Flew Over the Sea (1948)
- The Maragatan Sphinx (1950)

== Bibliography ==
- Nicolás Fernández-Medina & Maria Truglio. Modernism and the Avant-garde Body in Spain and Italy. Routledge, 2016.
