= Tina Gascó =

Spanish actress

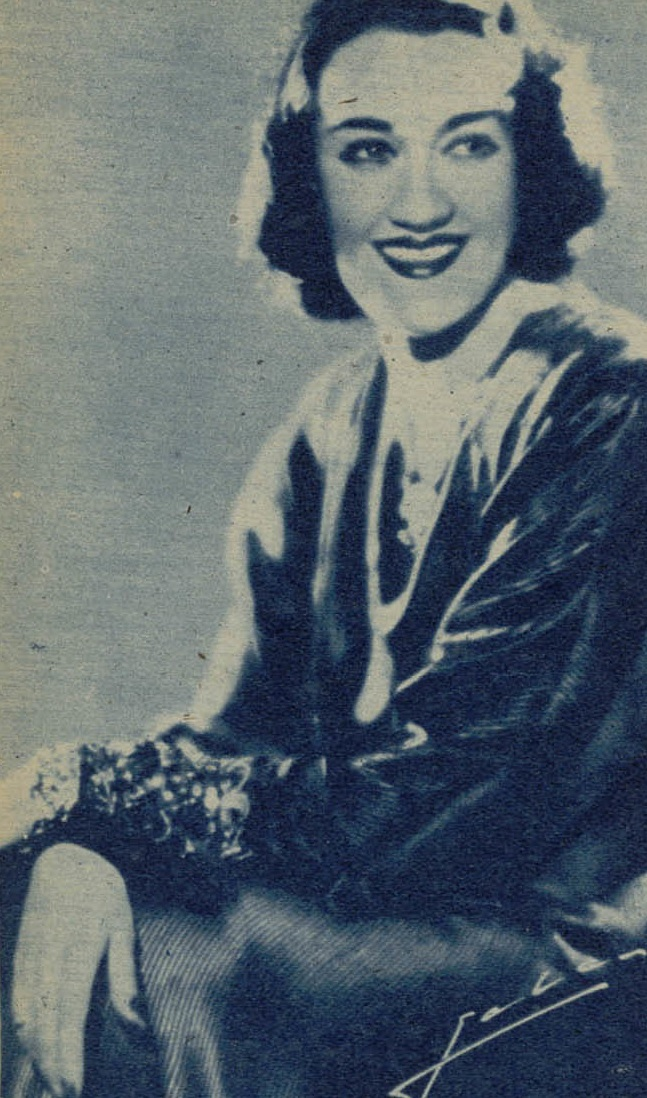
- Gascó in 1944
- Born: 24 September 1914; Seville, Spain
- Died: 18 August 1973 (aged 58); Madrid, Spain
- Occupation: Actress

Tina Gascó (1914–1973) was a Spanish actress. She was primarily active in theatre but also appeared in several films. She played the title role in the 1948 film Doña María the Brave. Onstage she regularly performed alongside her husband Fernando Granada.

== Selected filmography ==
- María de la O (1936)
- The Barber of Seville (1938)
- Doña María the Brave (1948)
- Quanto sei bella Roma (1959)

== Bibliography ==
- Goble, Alan. The Complete Index to Literary Sources in Film. Walter de Gruyter, 1999.
- London, John. Reception and Renewal in Modern Spanish Theatre, 1939–1963. MHRA, 1997.
- Nebrera, Gregorio Torres. Historia y antología del teatro español de posguerra (1940–1975). Editorial Fundamentos, 2002.
