= The Party Goes On =

1948 film

- Directed by: Enrique Gómez
- Written by: Juan Martín; Andrés Rodríguez Villa; Enrique Gómez
- Starring: Antonio Casal; María Isbert; Juan Vázquez
- Cinematography: Sebastián Perera
- Edited by: Antonio Gimeno
- Music by: Jesús García Leoz
- Production company: Sagitario Films
- Release date: 31 December 1948
- Running time: 110 minutes
- Country: Spain
- Language: Spanish

The Party Goes On (Spanish: La fiesta sigue) is a 1948 Spanish drama film directed by Enrique Gómez and starring Antonio Casal, María Isbert and Juan Vázquez. It is set in the world of bullfighting

== Cast ==
- Fernando Aguirre as Empresario
- Rafael Albaicín as Rafael
- Gabriel Algara
- Margarita Andrey as Genoveva
- Manuel Arbó
- Mariano Asquerino as Marqués
- Rafael Bardem
- Antonio Casal as Pacorro
- Carlos Casaravilla as M. Chambom
- Juan de Landa as Padre prior
- Marianela de Montijo as Gitanilla
- Roberto Font as Felipe
- Luís Gómez as Torero
- Casimiro Hurtado as Alguacil
- José Isbert as M. Lapin
- María Isbert as Campesina
- Tony Leblanc as Joaquín
- Juana Mansó as Madre
- Leonor María as Soledad
- Arturo Marín as Alcalde
- José Prada as Mr. Peel
- Joaquín Roa as Pregonero
- Alberto Romea as Mr. Wines
- Rafael Romero Marchent as Torero
- José María Seoane as Cristóbal
- Juan Vázquez as Fraile

== Bibliography ==
- Bentley, Bernard. A Companion to Spanish Cinema. Boydell & Brewer 2008.
