= Confidences (film) =

1948 film

- Directed by: Jerónimo Mihura
- Written by: Jerónimo Mihura; Miguel Mihura
- Produced by: Julio Peña; Ramón Peña
- Starring: Julio Peña; Sara Montiel; Guillermo Marín
- Cinematography: Michel Kelber
- Edited by: Petra de Nieva
- Music by: Manuel Parada
- Production company: Victoria Films
- Distributed by: Diana Exclusivas
- Release date: 8 March 1948
- Running time: 124 minutes
- Country: Spain
- Language: Spanish

Confidences (Spanish: Confidencia) is a 1948 Spanish drama film directed by Jerónimo Mihura and starring Julio Peña, Sara Montiel and Guillermo Marín. The film's sets were designed by the art director Sigfrido Burmann.

== Cast ==
- Julio Peña as Carlos
- Sara Montiel as Elena
- Guillermo Marín as Doctor Barde
- José Isbert as Don Mauricio
- Félix Fernández as Doctor Elías
- Julia Lagos as Dueña del café
- José Prada as Doctor Vives
- Antonio Riquelme as Redactor
- Miriam Di San Servolo as María
- Rosario Abollo as Enfermera
- Fernando Aguirre as Tomás
- Matilde Artero as Pueblerina
- Ángel de Andrés as Luis
- Camino Garrigó as Madre de Carlos
- Manuel Guitián as Ordenanza
- Francisco Hernández as Doctor Suárez
- Arturo Marín as Gómez
- Carmen Muñoz as Luisina
- Joaquín Puyol as Redactor jefe
- Santiago Rivero as Emilio
- José María Rodríguez as Jardinero
- Pilar Silvet as Camarera
- Pepita Vásquez as Enfermera
- Juan Vázquez as Martoni

== Bibliography ==
- Bosworth, R.J.B. Claretta: Mussolini's Last Lover. Yale University Press, 2017.
- De España, Rafael. Directory of Spanish and Portuguese film-makers and films. Greenwood Press, 1994.
