= Marta Santaolalla =

Spanish actress (1920–2019)

- Born: 27 October 1920; Madrid, Spain
- Died: 22 October 2019 (aged 98); Madrid, Spain
- Occupation: Actress
- Years active: 1941–1963 (film)

Marta Santaolalla (27 October 1920 – 22 October 2019) was a Spanish stage, film and television actress.

Santaolalla died in October 2019 at the age of 98.

== Selected filmography ==
- Autumn Roses (1943)
- Cristina Guzmán (1943)
- Life Begins at Midnight (1944)

== Bibliography ==
- Bentley, Bernard. A Companion to Spanish Cinema. Boydell & Brewer, 2008.
