= Juan de Landa =

Spanish actor

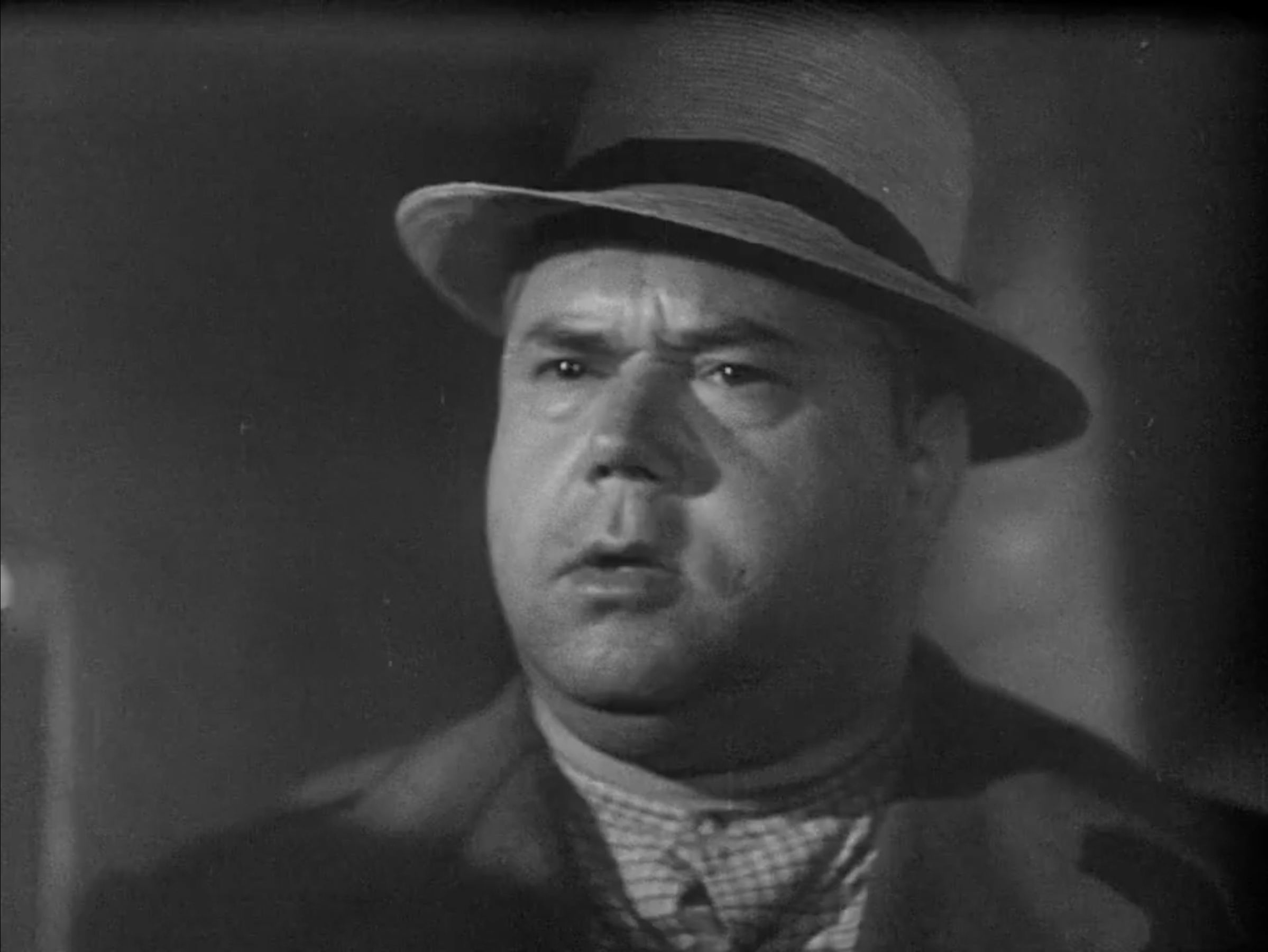
- De Landa in Ossessione (1943)
- Born: 27 January 1894; Motrico, Basque Country, Spain
- Died: 18 February 1968 (aged 74); Motrico, Basque Country, Spain
- Other name: Juan Pisón Pagoaga y Landa
- Occupation: Actor
- Years active: 1930–1958

Juan de Landa (1894–1968) was a Spanish film actor, who was born in the Basque Country. De Landa entered the film industry in 1930 following the arrival of sound film. He initially acted in Spanish-language versions of Hollywood films, but later worked mainly in the Spanish and Italian film industries. His best-known role is in Luchino Visconti's 1943 film Ossessione.

== Partial filmography ==
- El último de los Vargas (1930) - Capitán de los Rurales
- El valiente (1930) - Sargento de policia
- El presidio (1930) - Butch
- De frente, marchen (1930) - El sargento Gruñón
- La fruta amarga (1931) - Bill
- Love in Every Port (1931) - Tripode
- Su última noche (1931) - Aquiles Desano
- The Trial of Mary Dugan (1931) - Insp. Hunt
- Se ha fugado un preso (1935)
- El secreto de Ana María (1936)
- Al margen de la ley (1936)
- Carmen fra i rossi (1939) - Amalio
- The Sin of Rogelia Sanchez (1940) - Massimo
- Saint Rogelia (1940) - Máximo
- L'uomo della legione (1940) - Antonio Scotto, il meccanico
- The Pirate's Dream (1940) - Bieco de la Muerte
- La forza bruta (1941) - Bob
- Giuliano de' Medici (1941) - Goro
- The Prisoner of Santa Cruz (1941) - Pietro
- The King's Jester (1941) - Sparafucile
- Black Gold (1942) - Pietro, il minatore
- Tragic Night (1942) - Faille
- Ossessione (1943) - Giuseppe Bragana
- National Velvet (1944) - Padron Giovanni
- Noche sin cielo (1947) - Federico
- The Drummer of Bruch (1948) - Tomàs
- The Party Goes On (1948) - Padre prior
- Just Any Woman (1949) - Padre de Luis
- In a Corner of Spain (1949) - Alcalde
- The Maragatan Sphinx (1950) - Tío Cristóbal
- My Beloved Juan (1950) - Sebastián
- The Vila Family (1950) - Teófilo Torrens
- Alina (1950) - Lucien
- Devotion (1950) - Don Vidris, il prete
- Brief Rapture (1951) - Capobanda
- Salvate mia figlia (1951)
- One Hundred Little Mothers (1952) - Don Michele
- The Dream of Zorro (1952) - César / Pedro
- The Woman Who Invented Love (1952) - Usuraio Passadonato
- La figlia del diavolo (1952) - Il boia
- Redemption (1952) - Parroco
- Captain Phantom (1953) - Carlos
- Beat the Devil (1953) - Hispano-Suiza Driver
- El hombre que veía la muerte (1953)
- We Stole a Tram (1956) - Rossi
- Faustina (1957) - Mefistófeles
- Los ángeles del volante (1957) - Nicolás
- The Man Who Wagged His Tail (1957) - Butcher
- Cuatro en la frontera (1958) - (final film role)

== Bibliography ==
- Bacon, Henry. Visconti: Explorations of Beauty and Decay. Cambridge University Press, 1998.
