= Higuera de las Dueñas =

- Municipality
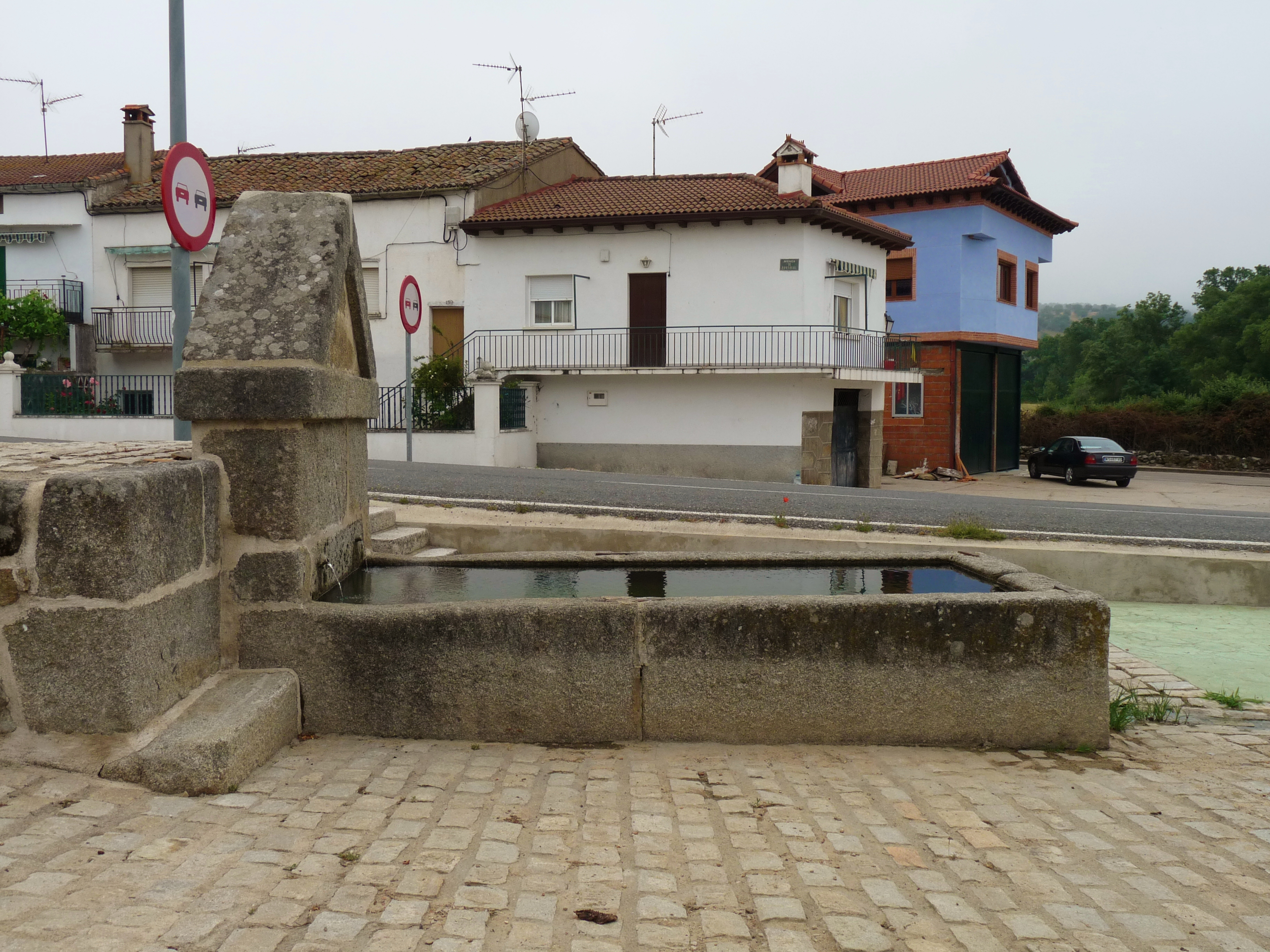
- Source in Higuera de las Dueñas

- Flag Coat of arms

- Location in Spain. Higuera de las Dueñas (Castile and León)
- Coordinates: 40°14′23″N 4°36′06″W
- Country: Spain
- Autonomous community: Castile and León
- Province: Ávila
- Municipality: Higuera de las Dueñas

Area
  - Total: 35 km^{2} (14 sq mi)

Population (2025-01-01)
  - Total: 250
  - Density: 7.1/km^{2} (18/sq mi)
- Time zone: UTC+1 (CET)
  - Summer (DST): UTC+2 (CEST)
- Website: Official website

Higuera de las Dueñas is a municipality located in the province of Ávila, Castile and León, Spain.

== Population ==
Historical population
Year	Pop.	±% p.a.
2023	275	—
2024	270	−1.82%
2025	250	−7.41%
Source: INE
