= Miguel Mihura =

Spanish playwright (1905–1977)

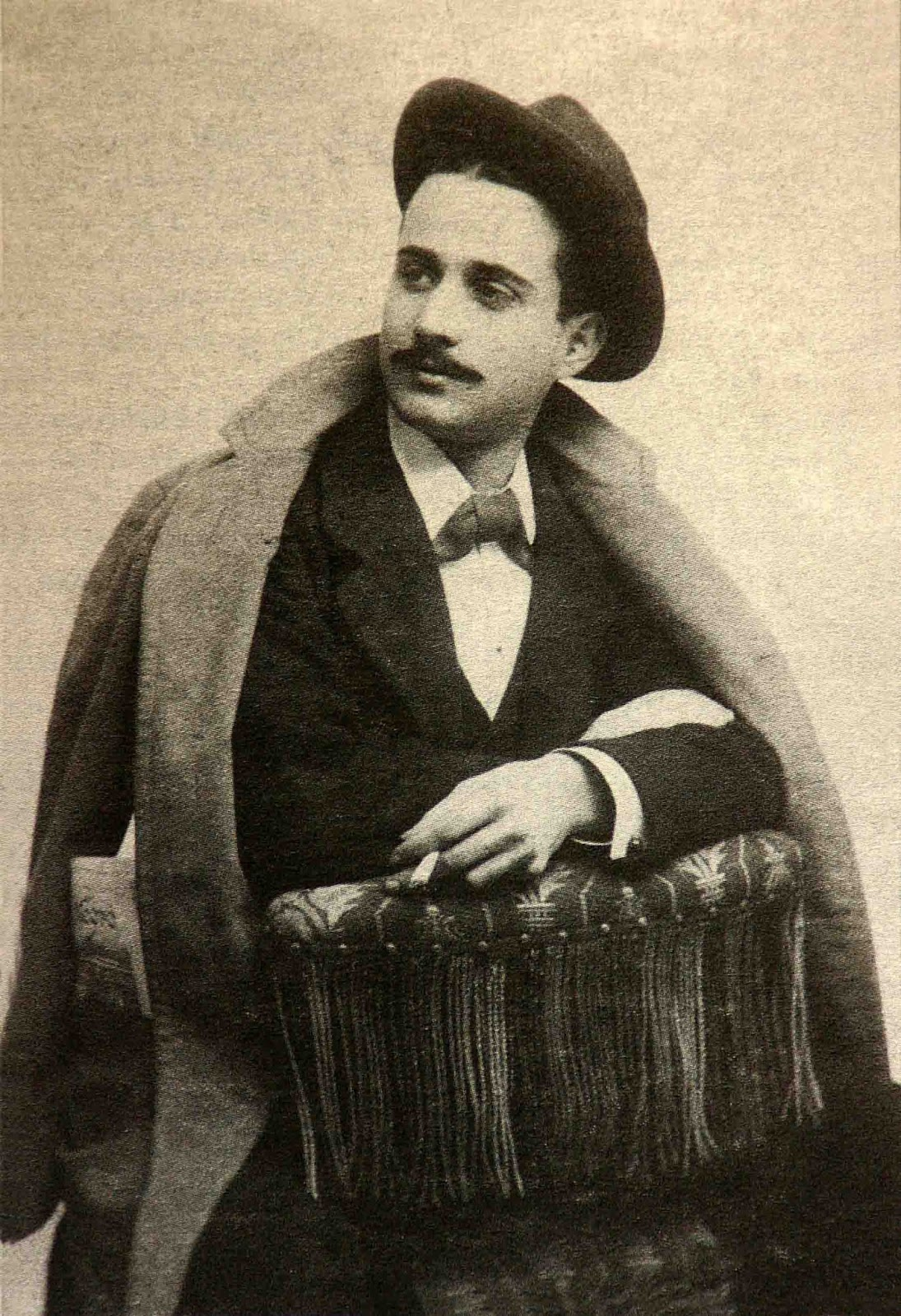
- Born: Miguel Mihura Santos; 21 July 1905; Madrid, Spain
- Died: 27 October 1977 (aged 72); Madrid, Spain

Miguel Mihura Santos (21 July 1905, in Madrid – 27 October 1977) was a Spanish playwright. He is best known for his comedy Tres sombreros de copa (1952), a work of absurd humor that predates similar works by Beckett or Ionesco and that broke with many of the previous conventions of Spanish comic theatre. He was also active as a comics artist.

== Biography ==
Miguel Mihura was born in Madrid in 1905. His father was an actor and theatrical producer. When he was in his twenties, he wrote his best-known comedy, Tres sombreros de copa, but its humour was not appreciated by the conservative pre-war Spanish society. Tres sombreros de copa was not staged until 1952, achieving a great success. In the 1920s he was a contributor of the satirical magazine Gutiérrez.

During the civil war he edited a satirical magazine entitled La Ametralladora which was produced by the nationalists. In 1941 he founded another satirical magazine, La Codorniz, which he owned and edited until 1944. He also contributed various magazines, including Mundo Hispánico and Vértice. In the latter he worked as the artistic director from 1939.

Mihura also wrote several screenplays in Spanish films during the second world war . Most of them were cut by the censors and some do not exist. One of his greatest contributions was in Welcome Mr. Marshall! (1953), directed by Luis García Berlanga.

His brother was the film director Jerónimo Mihura.

== Selected filmography ==
- Intrigue (1942)
- House of Cards (1943)
- The Sunless Street (1948)
- Confidences (1948)
- Troubled Lives (1949)
- They Always Return at Dawn (1949)
- Just Any Woman (1949)
- My Beloved Juan (1950)
- I Want to Marry You (1951)
- Welcome Mr. Marshall! (¡Bienvenido Sr Marshall!) (1953)
- Let's Make the Impossible! (1958)
