= They Always Return at Dawn =

- Directed by: Jerónimo Mihura
- Written by: Miguel Mihura
- Produced by: Julio Peña
- Cinematography: Jules Kruger
- Edited by: Petra de Nieva
- Music by: Manuel Parada
- Production company: Peña Films
- Distributed by: Goya Films
- Release date: 19 September 1949
- Running time: 87 minutes
- Country: Spain
- Language: Spanish

They Always Return at Dawn (Spanish: Siempre vuelven de madrugada) is a 1949 Spanish drama film directed by Jerónimo Mihura.

== Cast ==
- Mercedes Albert as Elvira
- Margarita Andrey as Susana
- Manuel Arbó as Comisario Suárez
- Rafael Bardem as Don Carlos
- Francisco Bernal as Barman
- Rafael Cortés
- Félix Fernandez as Don José
- José Franco as El hombre
- Casimiro Hurtado
- Rufino Inglés as Paco
- José Isbert as Don Jacobo
- María Martín as Mary
- Arturo Marín as Don Ramón
- Matilde Muñoz Sampedro as Maruja
- Miguel Pastor as Manolo
- Julio Peña as Luis
- Antonia Planas as Doña Pilar
- Conrado San Martín as Andrés
- Asunción Sancho as Cecilia
- Pilar Sirvent as Chica del tiro al blanco
- María Luisa Solé

== Bibliography ==
- Bentley, Bernard. A Companion to Spanish Cinema. Boydell & Brewer 2008.
