= Autumn Roses (1943 film) =

- Directed by: Juan de Orduña
- Written by: Jacinto Benavente (play), Antonio Mas Guindal
- Produced by: Federico Valle
- Cinematography: Willy Goldberger
- Music by: Juan Quintero
- Release date: 1943
- Running time: 72 minutes
- Country: Spain
- Language: Spanish

Autumn Roses (Spanish: Rosas de otoño) is a 1943 Spanish film directed by Juan de Orduña, although Eduardo Morera is also credited by some. It is the first feature-length film adaptation of the play of the same name (Rosas de otoño) by Jacinto Benavente; an earlier film adaptation by Morera in 1931, Autumn Roses, was a short.

== Cast ==
- María Fernanda Ladrón de Guevara
- Mariano Asquerino
- Marta Santaolalla
- Luchy Soto
- Julia Lajos
- Fernando Fernán Gómez
- José María Seoane
- Luis Prendes
