= The Butterfly That Flew Over the Sea =

1948 film

- Directed by: Antonio de Obregón
- Written by: Jacinto Benavente; Eugene Deslaw; Antonio de Obregón
- Cinematography: Alfonso Nieva
- Music by: Daniel Montorio
- Production company: Obregón
- Release date: 1948
- Country: Spain
- Language: Spanish

The Butterfly That Flew Over the Sea (Spanish:La mariposa que voló sobre el mar) is a 1948 Spanish film directed by Antonio de Obregón.

== Cast ==
- Francisco Alonso
- Manuel Arbó
- Osvaldo Genazzani
- Guillermina Grin
- Luis Hurtado
- Mari Paz Molinero
- Niní Montiam
- Jacinto San Emeterio
- Vicente Vega

== Bibliography ==
- Nicolás Fernández-Medina & Maria Truglio. Modernism and the Avant-garde Body in Spain and Italy. Routledge, 2016. ISBN 9781138911437
