= When the Night Comes (film) =

1946 film

- Directed by: Jerónimo Mihura
- Written by: Carlos Blanco; Jerónimo Mihura
- Based on: When the Night Comes by Joaquín Calvo Sotelo
- Starring: Irasema Dilián; Julio Peña; Guillermina Grin
- Cinematography: Manuel Berenguer
- Edited by: Mariano Pombo
- Music by: José Ruiz de Azagra
- Production company: Marta Films
- Distributed by: CIFESA
- Release date: 2 December 1946
- Running time: 111 minutes
- Country: Spain
- Language: Spanish

When the Night Comes (Spanish: Cuando llegue la noche) is a 1946 Spanish drama film directed by Jerónimo Mihura and starring Irasema Dilián, Julio Peña and Guillermina Grin. It is based on the play of the same title by Joaquín Calvo Sotelo. The film's sets were designed by the art director Teddy Villalba.

== Cast ==
- Irasema Dilián as María Cistina / Magda Layón
- Julio Peña as Guillermo Arranz
- Fernando Fernández de Córdoba as Daniel
- Guillermina Grin as Ana Rosa
- Ramón Martori as Eugenio Nogués
- Juana Mansó as Viejecita
- Emilio Aragón as Juanote
- Arturo Marín as Sr. Garbone
- Margarita Albéniz as Adelaida
- Manuel Requena as Posadero
- Fernando Aguirre as Médico
- Santiago Rivero as Policía
- Francisco Bernal as Revisor
- Eva López as Tabernera

== Bibliography ==
- De España, Rafael. Directory of Spanish and Portuguese film-makers and films. Greenwood Press, 1994.
- Goble, Alan. The Complete Index to Literary Sources in Film. Walter de Gruyter, 1999.
