= Guillermo Marín =

Spanish actor (1905–1988)

Guillero Marín
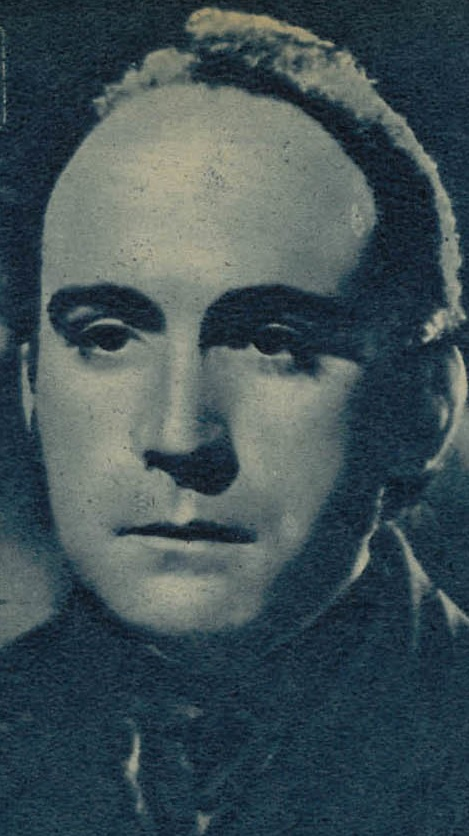
- Born: 12 August 1905; Madrid, Spain
- Died: 21 May 1988 (aged 82)
- Years active: 1939 - 1988

Guillermo Marín (12 August 1905 – 21 May 1988) was a classic Spanish film and theater actor. He was one of the leading men in Spanish cinema of the 1940s, and in stages in the 1950s. He played several characters in successful films directed by Edgar Neville, but eventually preferred stage before screen.

== Selected filmography ==
- El escándalo (1943) - Lázaro
- Fin de curso (1943) - Self (uncredited)
- Eugenia de Montijo (1944) - Jerónimo Bonaparte
- Lola Montes (1944) - Walter
- The Tower of the Seven Hunchbacks (1945) - Dr. Sabatino
- Tarjeta de visita (1944) - Germán
- La vida en un hilo (1945) - Ramón
- Domingo de carnaval (1945) - Gonzalo Fonseca
- Last Stand in the Philippines (1945) - Doctor Rogelio Vigil
- Viento de siglos (1945)
- The Prodigal Woman (1946) - Enrique
- I Will Consult Mister Brown (1946)
- The Faith (1947) - Don Álvaro Montesinos
- Barrio (1947) - Don César
- Don Quijote de la Mancha (1947) - Duke
- Canción de medianoche (1947)
- Confidences (1948) - Doctor Barde
- The Howl (1948) - Noler
- Póker de ases (1948)
- El Marqués de Salamanca (1948) - Buschenthal
- Mare Nostrum (1948) - Von Kramer / Conde Gavelin
- ¡Olé torero! (1949) - D. Jacinto
- Pequeñeces... (1950) - Conspirador
- Agustina of Aragon (1950) - Napoléon Bonaparte
- Apartado de correos 1001 (1950) - Testigo del asesinato
- Verónica (1950)
- La fuente enterrada (1950) - Pablo
- María Antonia 'La Caramba' (1951)
- Cerca del cielo (1951) - José María Trías
- Catalina de Inglaterra (1951)
- Hace cien años (1952) - Carlos Latorre
- Devil's Roundup (1952) - Diablo
- Crimen en el entreacto (1954)
- La ironía del dinero (1957) - José Luis (segment "Sevilla")
- Faustina (1957) - Príncipe Natalio
- The Last Days of Pompeii (1959) - Ascanius, Consul of Pompei
- La rana verde (1960) - Banquero
- Green Harvest (1961)
- Diabruras de Marisol (1962) - Don Pablo, tío de Marisol
- The Balcony of the Moon (1962) - Indalecio de Quirós
- Operación Embajada (1963) - Antonio Zaldívar
- El juego de la verdad (1963) - Gonzalo
- La nueva Cenicienta (1964) - Ramón
- Balearic Caper (1966) - Secret Service Chief
- Road to Rocío (1966) - Fernando Aguilar
- Un millón en la basura (1967) - Don Leonardo Borja Salcedo
- Blood in the Bullring (1969) - Director del periódico
- Pecados conyugales (1969)
- El abominable hombre de la Costa del Sol (1970) - Enrique
- Don Erre que erre (1970) - Marqués de San Tórtolo
- Mi hija Hildegart (1977) - Presidente del tribunal
- La miel (1979) - Don Jaime
- El divorcio que viene (1980) - Notario
- 127 millones libres de impuestos (1981)
- The Warrior and the Sorceress (1984) - Bal Caz (as William Marin)
- Las bicicletas son para el verano (1984) - Don Simón
- La corte de Faraón (1985) - Prior (final film role)

== Theater ==
- La flauta de Bartolo (1939)
