= Autumn Roses (1931 film) =

1931 film

- Directed by: Eduardo Morera
- Written by: Enrique Pedro Maroni
- Starring: Francisco Canaro; Carlos Gardel
- Cinematography: Antonio Merayo, Roberto Schmidt
- Music by: Guillermo Barbieri and José Rial
- Release date: 1931
- Country: Argentina
- Language: Spanish

Autumn Roses (Spanish: Rosas de otoño) is a 1931 Argentine short musical film directed by Eduardo Morera.

== Gardel's musical short films from 1930 ==
In 1930 Gardel starred in fifteen sound musical short films, each one about a song, directed by Eduardo Morera and produced by Federico Valle, one of the pioneers of Latin American cinema. Valle was born in Italy in 1880, and after working with the Lumière Brothers and taking classes with Georges Méliès, he emigrated to Argentina in 1911 and since then has produced dozens of highly valuable cinematographic works, including the first newsreels and animated feature films of Quirino Cristiani, the first in the history of world cinema of its kind.

Of the fifteen shorts, five were ruined in the laboratory, including one entitled Leguisamo solo, in which the jockey Irineo Leguisamo appeared, and another entitled El quinielero. The ten short films released were: El carroro, Longing, Autumn roses, Hand in hand, Yira, yira, I'm afraid, Padrino pelao, Enfundá la mandolina, Canchero and Viejo tuxedo.
