= Julio Peña =

Spanish actor (1912–1972)

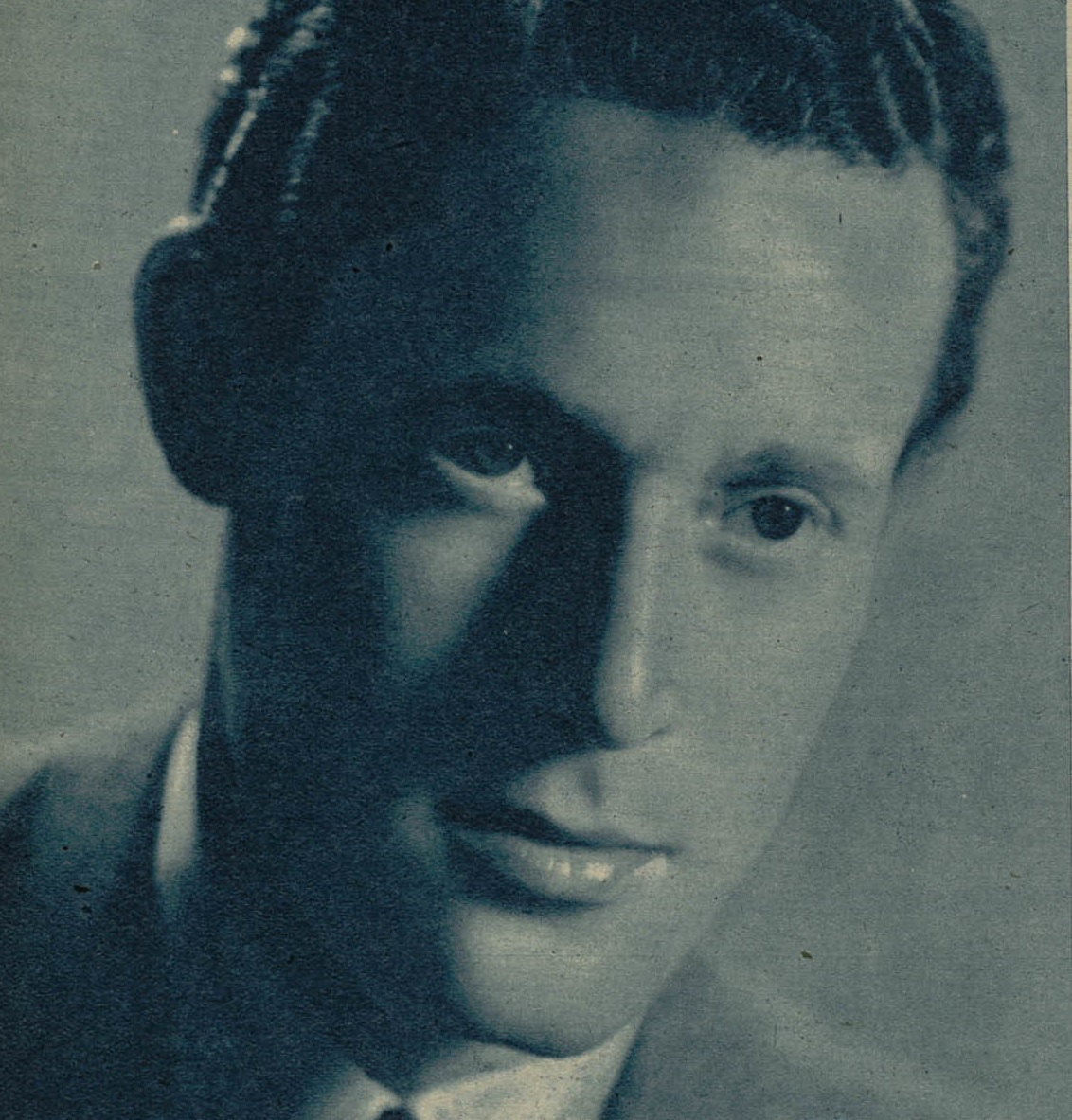
- Born: 18 June 1912; Madrid
- Died: July 27, 1972 (aged 60); Marbella, Málaga
- Occupation: Actor
- Spouse: Susana Canales
- Father: Ramón Peña

Julio Peña (18 June 1912 - 27 July 1972) was a Spanish actor. He appeared in more than one hundred films from 1930 to 1972. He died on July 27, 1972, aged 60 at Cortijo Blanco in Marbella, where he was resting after appearing in the film Horror Express.

== Filmography ==
Year	Title	Role	Notes
1930	Doña mentiras	Bob Deval	
1931	La fruta amarga	Dick	
1931	La mujer X	Darrell	
1931	Esclavas de la moda	Mario	
1931	Mamá	José María	
1933	Primavera en otoño	Manolo Fresneda	
1933	Una viuda romántica	Pepe Castellanos	
1933	Yo, tú y ella	Carlos	
1934	La ciudad de cartón	Asistente	
1934	Un capitan de Cosacos	Ivan Trainoff	
1935	Julieta compra un hijo	Guillermo	
1935	Angelina o el honor de un brigadier	Rodolfo Alvarez de Castro	
1935	Rosa de Francia	Valouise	
1935	Alas sobre El Chaco	Mitchell	
1938	Las cinco advertencias de Satanás		
1939	Los hijos de la noche	Piruli	
1939	María de la O	Juan Miguel	
1940	L'espoir	Attignies	
1940	La última falla	Julio Romero	
1940	Marianela	Pablo	
1940	The Unloved Woman	Norberto	
1942	Correo de Indias	Capitán del Correo de Indias	
1942	Intrigue	Roberto Téllez	
1943	Mi vida en tus manos	Daniel	
1945	Noche decisiva	Valentín	
1945	Thirsty Land		
1945	Cero en conducta	Alfredo Rivera	
1946	White Mission	Padre Javier	
1946	A New Play	Edmundo	
1946	When the Night Comes	Guillermo Arranz	
1947	Serenata española	Isaac Albéniz	
1947	Fuenteovejuna	Rey Fernando el Católico	
1948	Alhucemas	Capitán Fernando Salas	
1948	Confidences	Carlos	
1949	They Always Return at Dawn	Luis	
1950	Nuestras vidas	Fernando	
1950	Sangre en Castilla		
1950	Don Juan		
1952	The Eyes Leave a Trace	Roberto Ayala	
1952	Amaya	Íñigo García	
1954	Manicomio	Miguel	
1954	La patrouille des sables	Luis	
1954	La patrulla	Matías	
1954	Tres hombres van a morir	Luis	
1955	Revelation	Ruggero Scotto	
1956	Alexander the Great	Arsites	
1956	Return to the Truth	Comandante Jorge Peña	
1957	Horas de pánico		
1957	El anónimo		
1957	Spanish Affair	Sr. Oliva	
1957	...Y eligió el infierno	Padre Frederick	
1959	Solomon and Sheba	Zadok	
1959	Vacations in Majorca		
1960	Monsieur Robinson Crusoe		
1960	The Revolt of the Slaves	Torquato	
1961	Patricia mía		
1961	The Happy Thieves	Señor Elek - Hotel Bourne Desk Clerk	Uncredited
1962	Abuelita Charlestón	Peter	
1963	The Castilian	Iago	
1963	Han robado una estrella	Comisario	
1964	Alféreces provisionales	Julio Mendoza	
1964	Minnesota Clay	Doctor Stevens	
1964	Bullet in the Flesh	Sheriff	
1964	Le tardone	Reliable person	
1964	I magnifici brutos del West		
1965	Veneri in collegio		
1965	Sunscorched	Reverendo Dean	
1965	Chimes at Midnight	Vassall	
1966	Kid Rodelo	Balsas	
1966	Mutiny at Fort Sharpe		
1966	La mujer de tu prójimo		
1966	Web of Violence	Dr. Fassi	
1966	Savage Pampas	Pvt. Chicha	Uncredited
1967	The Hellbenders	Sergeant Tolt	
1967	Si muore solo una volta	Ackerman	
1968	Volver a vivir		
1968	One Step to Hell		
1968	Satanik	Inspector Trent	
1968	Villa Rides	General	
1968	Pistol for a Hundred Coffins	Mayor	
1968	The Mercenary		Uncredited
1969	Relaciones casi públicas	Redactor del periódico	
1969	Simón Bolívar	señor Hernandez	
1969	Sundance and the Kid	Doctor	
1969	Taste of Vengeance	John Murray	
1969	The Price of Power	Governor of Texas	
1970	El Condor	General Hernandez	
1970	Juan y Junior... en un mundo diferente	Especialista / Don Federico Souto	
1971	In the Eye of the Hurricane	Police Inspector	
1971	Las amantes del diablo	Inspector González	
1971	La Noche de Walpurgis	Dr. Hartwig (coroner)	
1971	El Hombre que Vino del Odio	Sergei	
1971	La araucana	Quiroga	
1971	Cross Current	Inspector Baldini	
1971	Red Sun	Peppie	
1972	A House Without Boundaries	Decano del coro	
1972	Horror Express	Inspector Mirov	
1972	Travels with My Aunt	M. Alexandre	Uncredited
1973	Horror Rises from the Tomb	Jean	
1973	Las flores del miedo	Ray	
1973	Ella (Trágica obsesión)		
1974	Voodoo Black Exorcist		Uncredited, (final film role)
