= Antonio Román =

Spanish film director, screenwriter and film producer

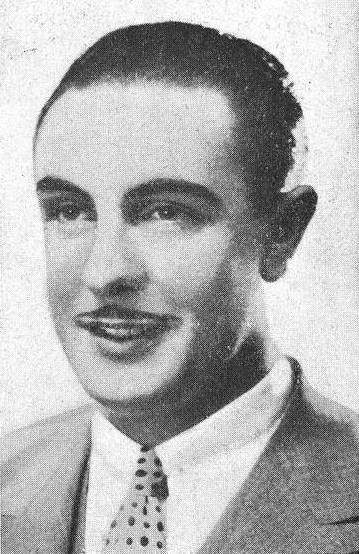
- Román in 1935
- Born: 9 November 1911; Ourense, Spain
- Died: 16 June 1989 (aged 77)

Antonio Román (9 November 1911 – 16 June 1989) was a prolific Spanish film director, screenwriter, film producer.

Antonio Román was born Ourense, Spain on 9 November 1911. Román began directing films in the late 1930s starting with documentaries. His first dramatic feature film was Esquadrilla. His other work includes an adaptation of Lola Montes and La Fierecilla domada, a retelling of The Taming of the Shrew. Many of these films star his wife, actress Yvonne Bastien.

Román has won several international awards such as Golden Olive Tree from the Cine de Humor de Bordighera in Italy for Bombas para la paz and an award for Pacto de silencio from the Cork Festival in Ireland.

Román died on 16 June 1989. Prior to his death, he worked with Radio Exterior. The Spanish newspaper El País stated on his death that Román was one of the most "prominent names in post-war Spanish cinema" directing over 30 films.

== Filmography ==
- Sandra (1930)
- Ensueño (1931)
- Canto à la emigración (1935)
- Ciudad encantada (1936)
- Barcelona o ritmo de un día (1939)
- Mérida (1940)
- Al borde del gran viaje (1940)
- De la Alhambra al Albaicín (1940)
- El hombre y el carro (1940)
- Escuadrilla (1941)
- Boda en el infierno (1942)
- Intrigue (1942)
- The House of Rain (1943)
- Lola Montes (1944)
- Last Stand in the Philippines (1945)
- Fuenteovejuna (1947)
- La vida encadenada (1948)
- El amor brujo (1949)
- Pacto de silencio (1949)
- El pasado amenaza (1950)
- La fuente enterrada (1950)
- La forastera (1951)
- Last Day (1952)
- Congress in Seville (1955)
- La fierecilla domada (1956)
- Dos novias para un torero (1956)
- Madrugada (1957)
- Los clarines del miedo (1958)
- Bombas para la paz (1959)
- Mi mujer me gusta más (1961)
- El sol en el espejo (1962)
- Pacto de silencio (1963)
- Un tiro por la espalda (1964)
- Ringo de Nebraska (1966)
- A Dog in Space (1966)
- El mesón del gitano (1969)
