= Jerónimo Mihura =

- Born: 6 July 1902; Cádiz, Spain
- Died: 10 October 1990 (aged 88); Fuenterrabía, Spain
- Other name: Jerónimo Mihura Santos
- Occupation: Director
- Years active: 1931–1968

Jerónimo Mihura (6 July 1902 – 10 October 1990) was a Spanish film director who made a number of documentary films. He is also notable for a group of screwball-style comedies such as House of Cards (1943) and My Beloved Juan (1950). He was the brother of the writer Miguel Mihura.

== Selected filmography ==
- House of Cards (1943)
- The Road to Babel (1945)
- When the Night Comes (1946)
- Confidences (1948)
- In a Corner of Spain (1949)
- Troubled Lives (1949)
- His Heart Awake (1949)
- They Always Return at Dawn (1949)
- My Beloved Juan (1950)
- I Want to Marry You (1951)
