= List of Spanish films of the 1930s =

A list of notable films produced in the cinema of Spain, ordered by year of release in the 1930s. For an alphabetical list of articles on Spanish films, see Category:Spanish films.

== 1930s ==
Title	Director	Cast	Genre	Notes
1930
La aldea maldita	Florián Rey	Pedro Larrañaga, Carmen Viance	Drama	Silent film
Prim	José Busch		Historical drama	About General Prim
Wine Cellars	Benito Perojo		Drama	Silent film
1931
Mamá	Benito Perojo		Comedy	Made in Hollywood in Spanish language for Fox Film Corporation
Fermín Galán	Fernando Roldán		Historical drama	
Isabel de Solís, reina de Granada	José Busch		Historical drama	
1932
Las Hurdes: Tierra Sin Pan	Luis Buñuel		Documentary	Banned documentary
1934
La hermana San Sulpicio	Florián Rey	Imperio Argentina		
Es mi hombre	Benito Perojo			
La verbena de la paloma	Benito Perojo		zarzuela	
El novio de mamá				
1935
Angelina o el honor de un brigadier	Louis King		Comedy	Made in Hollywood in Spanish language for Fox Film Corporation
Rumbo al Cairo	Benito Perojo	Miguel Ligero, María del Carmen Merino	Comedy	
La hija de Juan Simón	José Luis Sáenz de Heredia	Angelillo, Pilar Muñoz and Manuel Arbó	Musical	
Nobleza baturra	Florián Rey	Imperio Argentina, Juan de Orduña		Greatest success in the 1930s in Spain
Paloma Fair	Benito Perojo	Miguel Ligero, Roberto Rey	Musical	
1936
Carne de fieras	Armand Guerra	Pablo Álvarez Rubio, Marlène Grey, Georges Marck, Tina de Jarque, Alfredo Corcuera, Armand Guerra		Made by anarchists
Morena Clara	Florián Rey	Imperio Argentina		Huge success
1937
España	Jean-Paul Le Chanois		Documentary	Produced by Luis Buñuel
1938
Aurora de esperanza	Antonio Sau		Drama	Made by anarchists in Barcelona
Barrios bajos	Pedro Puche		Drama	Made by anarchists in Barcelona
Carmen la de Triana	Florián Rey	Imperio Argentina		Shot in Germany (Third Reich) studios UFA in Berlin. It was shot in both Spanish and German languages. Fernando Trueba made La niña de tus ojos in 1998 based on this film experience shooting in Berlin. Imperio Argentina tried to sue him.
Nuestro culpable	Fernando Mignoni		Musical comedy	Made by the anarchists in Madrid
El barbero de Sevilla	Benito Perojo			It was shot in the Nazi studios UFA in Berlin
1939
Mariquilla Terremoto	Benito Perojo			Shot in Nazi studios UFA in Berlin
La canción de Aixa	Florián Rey	Imperio Argentina		Shot in Nazi studios UFA in Berlin
Frente de Madrid	Edgar Neville		Spanish Civil War	Shot in Benito Mussolini's studios Cinecittà in Rome
Los hijos de la noche	Benito Perojo		Comedy	Shot in Benito Mussolini's studios Cinecittà in Rome
L'espoir, Sierra de Teruel	André Malraux		Spanish Civil War	Banned in France until 1945. Banned in Spain until 1977. Based on Malraux's own book L'espoir
Sighs of Spain	Benito Perojo	Miguel Ligero, Estrellita Castro, Roberto Rey	Comedy	Co-production with Germany

== See also ==
- List of films produced in the Spanish Revolution
