= Sister San Sulpicio =

Sister San Sulpicio (Spanish:La hermana San Sulpicio) may refer to:

- Sister San Sulpicio (novel), an 1889 novel by Armando Palacio Valdés
- Sister San Sulpicio (1927 film), a silent film directed by Florián Rey
- Sister San Sulpicio (1934 film), a sound film directed by Florián Rey
- Sister San Sulpicio (1952 film), a sound film directed by Luis Lucia

== See also ==
- The Rebellious Novice, a 1971 musical film adaptation
- Saint-Sulpice (disambiguation)
- Sulpicio (disambiguation)
