= The Cursed Village =

The Cursed Village may refer to:

- The Cursed Village (1930 film), a Spanish silent drama film
- The Cursed Village (1942 film), a Spanish drama film
