= Malvaloca =

Malvaloca may refer to:

- Malvaloca (play), a 1912 play by the Quintero brothers
- Malvaloca (1926 film), a silent Spanish film directed by Benito Perojo
- Malvaloca (1942 film), a Spanish film directed by Luis Marquina
- Malvaloca (1954 film), a Spanish film directed by Ramón Torrado
