= Daughter of the Sea =

Daughter of the Sea may refer to:

- Daughter of the Sea (1917 film), a Spanish silent film
- Daughter of the Sea (1953 film), a Spanish drama film
- "Daughter of the Sea" (2022 film), a Puerto Rican short drama film
- "Daughter of the sea" is an unofficial name given by the public after an original song called "Warbringers: Jaina" (see also World of Warcraft: Battle for Azeroth)
