= Filibus =

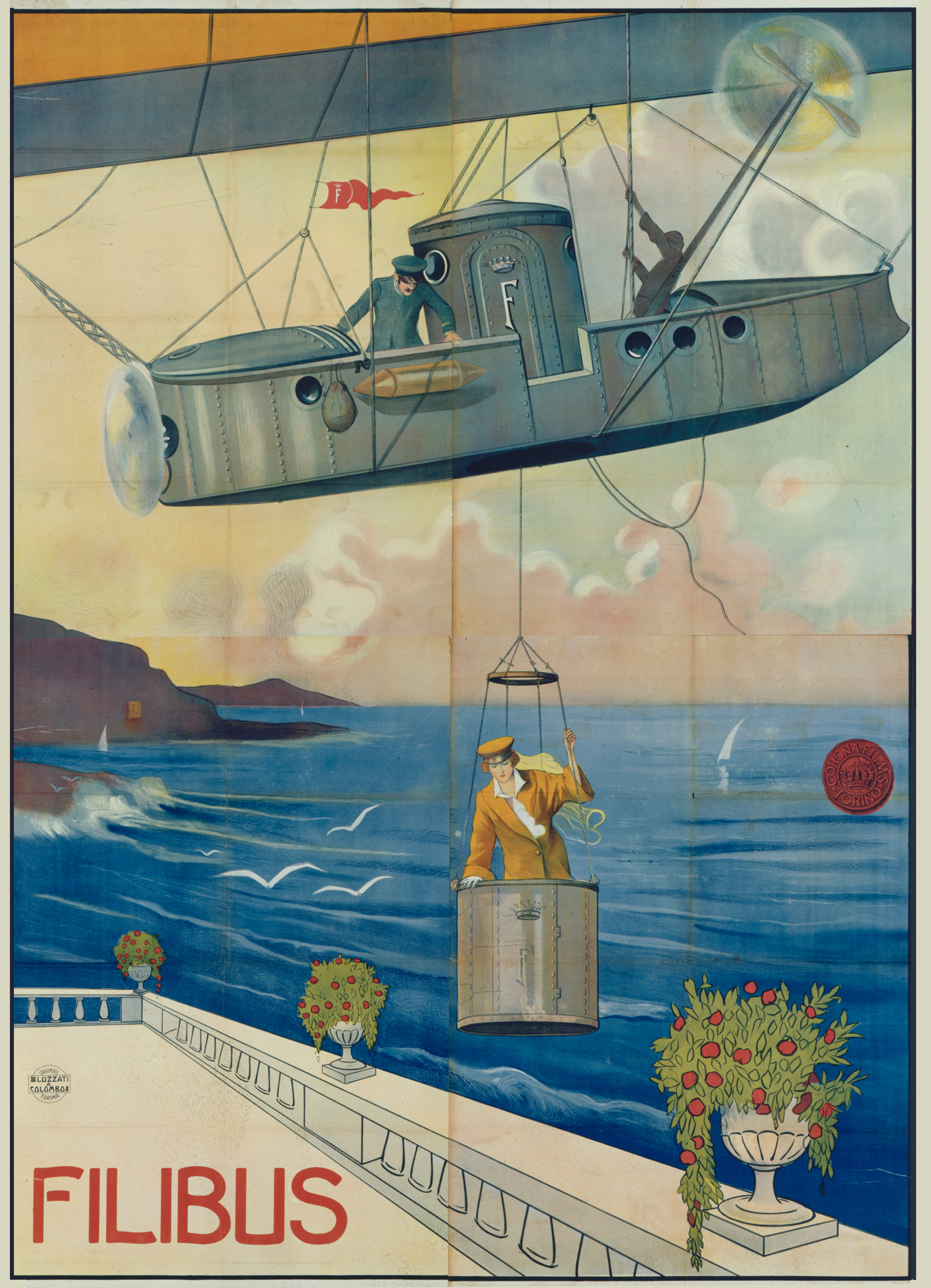
- Directed by: Mario Roncoroni
- Written by: Giovanni Bertinetti
- Starring: Valeria Creti
- Cinematography: Luigi Fiorio
- Production company: Corona Film
- Release date: March 1915 (Italy)
- Running time: 79 minutes at 18fps
- Country: Italy

Filibus is a 1915 Italian silent adventure film directed by Mario Roncoroni and written by the future science fiction author Giovanni Bertinetti (it). It features Valeria Creti (fr) as the title character, a mysterious sky pirate who makes daring heists with her technologically advanced airship. When an esteemed detective sets out on her trail, she begins an elaborate game of cat and mouse with him, slipping between various male and female identities to romance the detective's sister and stage a midnight theft of a pair of valuable diamonds.

Filibus was produced by Corona Film, a short-lived Turin-based studio operating on relatively low budgets and obscure casts. Though Italian reviews at its release were negative, Filibus has been well received by later writers and film historians who have highlighted its pioneering use of lesbian attraction, genderfluidity, and science fiction motifs, and its creative adaptation of stylistic elements from contemporary popular fiction. It has been screened at numerous film festivals, and a nitrate print survives at the Eye Filmmuseum (Amsterdam) with a dupe print held in Milan.

== Plot ==
Filibus (1915)

Baroness Troixmonde has a secret identity: a burglar known to the world as Filibus. In the wake of a bank robbery, a cash reward is offered to anyone who can track Filibus down, and renowned Detective Kutt-Hendy puts himself on the case. The Baroness visits the notary in charge of the reward and enters her name in the competition. Encountering Kutt-Hendy in the notary's office, she hatches a plan to baffle him: she tells him she knows he is Filibus. Leaving the office, she catches sight of Kutt-Hendy's sister, Leonora.

The Baroness rides to a deserted country road and uses a heliograph to signal for Filibus's airship. Her crew of masked assistants lower a capsule, allowing Filibus to reach the airship, change into her burglary outfit, and fly to Kutt-Hendy's residence. Kutt-Hendy is being visited by his friend, antiques collector Leo Sandy, who is unrequitedly in love with Leonora. When Kutt-Hendy is alone, Filibus uses the capsule to reach him and puts him to sleep with a narcotic. She takes a print of his hand, which she will use to make a specially formed glove.

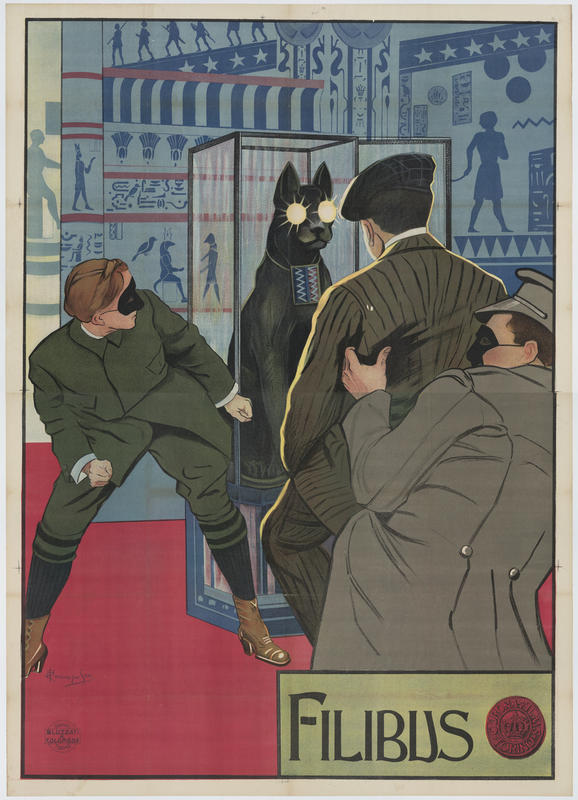
Filibus stages the diamond theft, as shown on a contemporaneous poster for the film

In disguise as a nobleman, the Count de la Brive, Filibus stages the kidnapping and rescue of Leonora, leaving a print from the glove on Leonora's clothing. The grateful Kutt-Hendy invites the nobleman to stay with them for some days, and the Count begins courting Leonora. At a party at Leo Sandy's villa, they see a glass case containing an ancient Egyptian statue of a cat with diamond eyes. When Sandy turns out the lights to show off the sparkling diamonds, the Count cuts a hole in the glass and deposits a note announcing that Filibus will steal the statue that night. Kutt-Hendy attempts to search the guests, but to his consternation finds the glass piece in his own pocket, with fingerprints that match none of the guests' hands. At home, he realizes to his horror that the prints on both the glass piece and Leonora's outfit match his own handprint.

Kutt-Hendy, resolved to trap Filibus, helps Sandy plant a tiny camera in one eye of the statue and replace the real diamonds with fake ones. That night, Filibus flies to Sandy's villa, kidnaps him, puts Kutt-Hendy under the narcotic, and reaches the statue. Realizing Kutt-Hendy's ruse, she locates the real diamonds, and stages the theft so that the camera photographs the unconscious Kutt-Hendy's face instead of hers.

Filibus returns Kutt-Hendy to his home, plants one of the real diamonds on his desk, and telephones the police to alert them of the theft and kidnapping. Kutt-Hendy pleads his innocence, but when they examine the diamond and the camera's picture, the police are led to believe that Kutt-Hendy must indeed be Filibus. Kutt-Hendy fears that this may be the case, if he committed all of Filibus's heists while sleepwalking. Meanwhile, Leo Sandy escapes Filibus's assistants, parachutes out of the dirigible and is picked up by a passing car and brought back to his villa. Learning of Kutt-Hendy's arrest, Sandy rushes to his assistance and reveals his side of the story. The relieved Kutt-Hendy is allowed to go free and pursue the real Filibus, whose identity is still unknown.

Intending to trap Filibus, he tells the press to announce that he has returned to his home. Filibus decides to use the narcotic to pin another crime on him, a robbery of the International Bank. This time Kutt-Hendy is prepared, and seizes Filibus when she tries to administer the narcotic. He unmasks Filibus and recognizes her as the Count de la Brive. He ties her up, locks her in his office, and goes to get the police. By the time he returns with policemen, Filibus has managed to get to a window, signal for her airship and escape into the sky. A few days later, Sandy proposes to Leonora, who accepts. Just as Kutt-Hendy is congratulating them, a letter falls from the sky—a letter from Filibus, telling him that they may meet again. High in the clouds, the Baroness, also known as Filibus, laughs over her haul from the International Bank.

== Cast ==
- Valeria Creti as Filibus/Baroness Troixmond/Count de la Brive
- Giovanni Spano as Detective Kutt Hendy
- Cristina Ruspoli as Leonora
- Mario Mariani as Police Magistrate
- Filippo Vallino as Leo Sandy

== Production ==
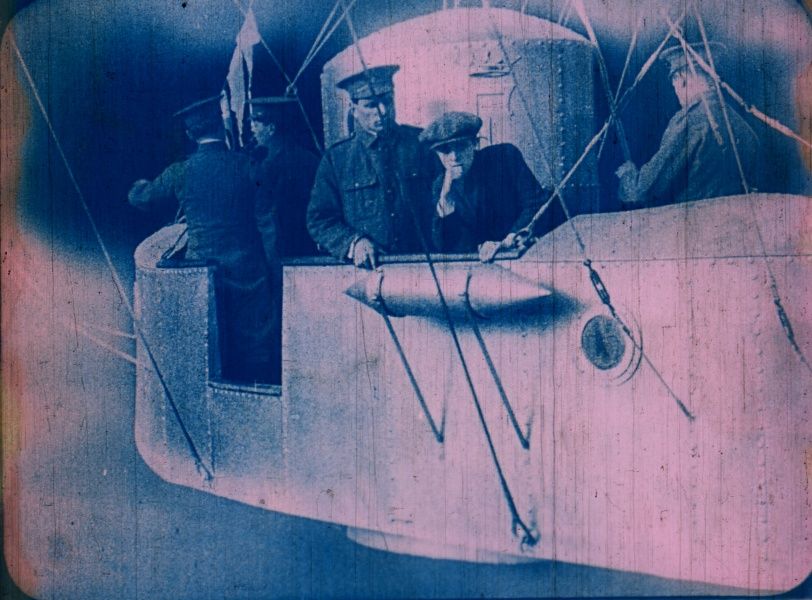
Filibus in her airship

In 1914, the Turin-based film distributor Umberto Corona launched his own production company, Corona Film. The company produced 26 films before disbanding in 1918, mostly low-budget adventure films with little-known casts.

Filibus, one of the company's offerings for 1915, was directed by Mario Roncoroni, probably making his directorial debut. Roncoroni went on to direct La Nave (1921) in collaboration with Gabriele d'Annunzio, before moving to Spain, where his film career continued through the rest of the 1920s. The cinematography was by Luigi Fiorio. Though the company was based in Turin, their studio building had not been completed in the spring of 1915, and so Filibus and other Corona productions of the time were filmed in and around Genoa. In the title role was a little-known actress, Valeria Creti; Cristina Ruspoli (often erroneously credited as Filibus in secondary sources) played Leonora. Other players included Giovanni Spano as Kutt-Hendy, Mario Mariani as the police inspector who briefly appears about halfway through the film, and possibly Filippo Vallino as Leo Sandy (the actor has not yet been identified with certainty).

The screenplay was by Giovanni Bertinetti, a writer connected to the Futurist movement among the Turin intelligentsia; in addition to film scenarios, he wrote science fiction and adventure stories for children, as well as self-help guides espousing the Futurist ideals of "courage, audacity and revolt." In writing Filibus, Bertinetti may have been especially influenced by a contemporary push to bring feminist ideals to Futurism, spearheaded by the French writer Valentine de Saint-Point's call for women to shake off oppression and torpor and to embrace the activity and independence associated with men.

== Themes ==
Filibus reflects the vogue in the 1910s for action-packed serial films featuring supervillains, such as Louis Feuillade's Fantômas (1913) and Judex (1916). Filibus's adventures in the film also recall other early action serials such as The Exploits of Elaine (1914), as well as the Arsène Lupin novels by Maurice Leblanc and Rocambole, a fictional adventurer created by Pierre Alexis Ponson du Terrail. (While the character of Filibus was likely inspired by the huge popularity of Fantômas, she strongly resembles Lupin in her enthusiasm for burgling and baffling for the thrill of it rather than for direct reward.) The film also recalls Victorin-Hippolyte Jasset's 1913 adventure film Protéa, featuring a female spy who dons multiple disguises (albeit working under a male boss and in partnership with a male spy, unlike the autonomous Filibus).

The film, while based in motifs and themes already popular in adventure serials, uses them in unusual ways; for example, the film's plot pushes the genre to the limits of its stylistic conventions, verging on a style redolent of fantasy. The screenplay also includes numerous unusual ideas, including the central image of the female sky pirate in her innovative airship and the concept of a high-society protagonist with a Jekyll-and-Hyde-like double nature.

In particular, the character of Filibus was novel for adventure films in presenting an all-powerful female character in full control of her life and actions, able to move fluently between gendered identities as well as on and over the earth. These themes mirror a wave of gender identity exploration then occurring in Italian culture: for example, Francesca Bertini had recently played a male protagonist in Pierrot the Prodigal, women's fashions at Futurist parties had begun to imitate styles for men, and a trickle of short action films with autonomous heroines had begun to appear. In real life, women's rights were highly limited in Italy, where married women were required to seek their husbands' permission to divorce, inherit property, or take out newspaper subscriptions, a situation dramatized in the popular diva films of the day.

Filibus went further than its contemporaries not only in its title character's total independence and completely male-coded outfits, but also in its overarching critique of appearances. The American writer Monica Nolan notes that, with its multiple disguises, stealthy adventures, and psychological subterfuges, the film blurs the line between illusion and reality—so thoroughly, indeed, that "it's anybody's guess whether [Filibus's] flirtation [with Leonora] is opportunistic, genuine, or a combination of the two."

== Release and reception ==
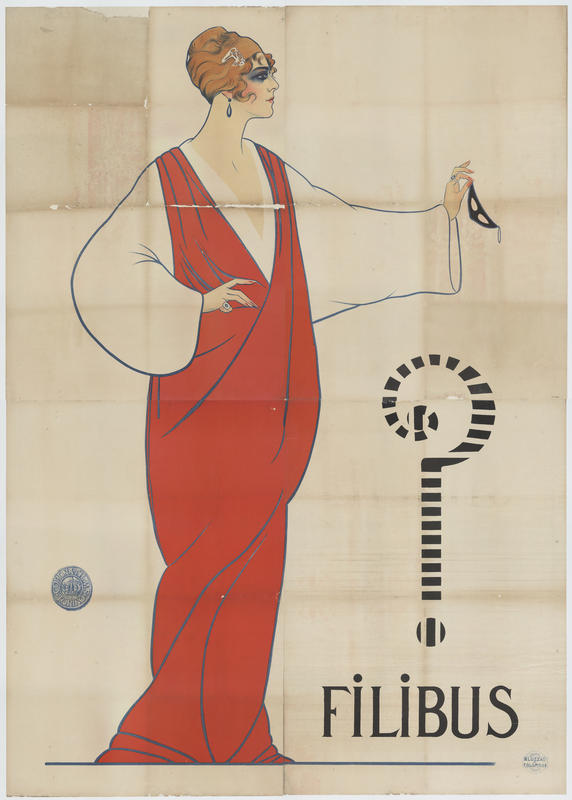
Filibus on a contemporary poster

Filibus was reviewed by the censorship department of the Italian Ministry of the Interior on 25 March 1915, and was first screened in Rome on 14 April of that year. Stefano Pittaluga, distributing the film on behalf of Corona, offered it both as a five-part serial and as a full-length feature. Early Italian reviews of the film were unfavorable; Monsù Travet, in the journal Film, criticized Filibus for borrowing the plot point of the glove from Fantômas, while G. Murè in L'Alba Cinematografica mocked the film's special effects, which he found childish. Early critics also reacted poorly to the plot as a whole, which they described as disjointed.

The film's conclusion suggests the possibility of a sequel, but Italy declared war on Austro-Hungary a month after the film's release, taking a dramatic toll on the country's film industry and possibly leading to the disbanding of Corona Film in 1918. The surviving print of Filibus survives at the EYE Film Institute Netherlands, with a duplicate print held at the National Museum of Cinema in Turin. EYE Film Institute completed a digital restoration of the print in 2017, collaborating with Milestone Films on a DVD release in 2019. Research by David Emery for the Milestone release revealed that Filibus was played, not by Ruspoli as previously assumed, but by the lesser-known Creti.

The Cineteca di Bologna screened Filibus in 1997 as part of the Cinema Ritrovato festival, with its program calling the film "an odd and funny forerunner of science-fiction movies." When the Dortmund Cologne International Women's Film Festival screened the film in 2013, its program described Filibus as "probably one of the first lesbian characters in the history of film." A film festival program for the Yugoslav Film Archive, where Filibus was shown in 2015, also commented on its pioneering exploration of lesbianism in film, nominating Filibus as cinema's first lesbian "bad girl". In 2017, EYE Film Institute's restoration of the film was shown at the San Francisco Silent Film Festival, with a score by the Mont Alto Motion Picture Orchestra. In her program notes, Monica Nolan calls the film's protagonist "one of a kind," adding: "The special effects are endearingly low-budget, but who cares, when the action is fast-paced and just plain fun?"

In a 2014 review of the film, Claude Rieffel praised the film's "elegant and elusive woman pirate" (élégante et insaisissable femme pirate), saying that Filibus's ability to pass between male and female identities made the character "a champion of transgenderism before that term had been coined" (championne avant l'heure du trans-genre). The performing arts writer Imogen Sara Smith, in an essay for Film Comment on the 2017 San Francisco festival, noted that the film "zips along with crisp, deliciously absurd plotting and an effervescent lightness of touch," highlighting Creti's "gracefully androgynous and slyly gleeful" performance as well as the plot's feminist themes. According to Smith, "In a summer when Wonder Woman was hailed in some quarters as a milestone for women in cinema, the audience watching Filibus (1915) at the San Francisco Silent Film Festival could be forgiven for wondering sardonically if movies are finally catching up to where they were a century ago."

In his autobiographical work Balão cativo (1973), the Brazilian writer Pedro Nava describes Filibus as a film "of major importance" (da maior importância), praising the genderfluidity and mythic aspects of the title character, as well as the film's innovative use of science fiction themes.
