= La hija de Juan Simón =

A poster for the 1935 film version

La hija de Juan Simón (Juan Simón's Daughter) is a musical play by Nemesio M. Sobrevila, which has been made into two Spanish films. It is also the name of the title track, and the song has been recorded by numerous artists such as Leonardo Favio and Rosalía.

The first film, directed by José Luis Sáenz de Heredia, was released in 1935 and starred Angelillo, Pilar Muñoz and Manuel Arbó. Luis Buñuel was the executive producer for Filmófono, and had a small role as an actor. One reviewer from Cine Español opined of the 1935 film, "It is essential to highlight the direction of La hija de Juan Simón as a decisive point in the creation of Spanish cinematic technique". The film was a major commercial success. The second film was released in 1957, directed by Gonzalo Delgras, with Antonio Molina in the title role.
