= Nights in Andalusia =

1938 film

- Directed by: Herbert Maisch
- Written by: Florián Rey; Philipp Lothar Mayring; Fred Andreas
- Based on: Carmen by Prosper Mérimée
- Produced by: Artur Kiekebusch-Brenken; Friedrich Pflughaupt
- Starring: Imperio Argentina; Friedrich Benfer; Karl Klüsner
- Cinematography: Reimar Kuntze
- Edited by: Anna Höllering
- Music by: Juan Mostaza-Murales; José Muñoz Molleda
- Production companies: Carl Froelich-Film; Hispano Filmproduktion
- Distributed by: UFA
- Release date: 5 July 1938
- Running time: 94 minutes
- Country: Germany
- Language: German

Nights in Andalusia (German: Andalusische Nächte) is a 1938 German musical film directed by Herbert Maisch and starring Imperio Argentina, Friedrich Benfer and Karl Klüsner. It is based on the opera Carmen by Georges Bizet, itself based on the novella Carmen by Prosper Mérimée. It was shot at the Babelsberg Studios in Berlin. The film's sets were designed by the art director Franz Schroedter. A Spanish-language version Carmen, la de Triana was made at the same time. The film and the parallel Spanish version were an influence on the 1998 Spanish film The Girl of Your Dreams.

== Cast ==
- Imperio Argentina as Carmen, a Gypsy girl
- Friedrich Benfer as Don José
- Karl Klüsner as Antonio Vargas Heredia
- Erwin Biegel as Salvadore
- Edwin Juergenssen as Major
- Siegfried Schürenberg as Rittmeister Moraleda
- Hans Adalbert Schlettow as Sergeant Garcia
- Kurt Seifert as Juan
- Hans Hessling as Triqui
- Albert Venohr as Ein Schmuggler
- Ernst Legal as Wirt in Sevilla
- Margit Symo as Eine Tänzerin
- Maria Koppenhöfer as Eine Wahrsagerin
- Friedrich Ettel as Wirt einer Herberge
- Milena von Eckhardt as Kellnerin

== Reception ==
Adolf Hitler praised the acting in the film, but stated that the film was bad.

== Works cited ==
- Niven, Bill (2018). Hitler and Film: The Führer's Hidden Passion. Yale University Press. ISBN 9780300200362.

== Bibliography ==
- Niven, Bill, Hitler and Film: The Führer's Hidden Passion. Yale University Press, 2018.
