= The Village Priest =

The Village Priest may refer to:

- The Village Priest (1927 film), a Spanish silent drama film
- The Village Priest (1949 film), a Canadian drama film
