= Sulpice =

The name Sulpice may refer to

- Sulpicius Severus, the 4th-century biographer
- Saint Sulpitius the Pious, a 7th-century saint
- Saint-Sulpice, many different locations in France

Surname:

- Jean Albert Sulpice (born 1913- ?), French curler
