= Aragonese Nobility =

- Directed by: Juan de Orduña
- Written by: Joaquín Dicenta (play); Juan de Orduña; Manuel Tamayo; Julio Coll
- Produced by: Fortunato Bernal
- Starring: Vicente Parra
- Cinematography: Federico G. Larraya
- Edited by: José Antonio Rojo
- Music by: Juan Solano
- Release date: 14 October 1965
- Running time: 98 minutes
- Country: Spain
- Language: Spanish

Aragonese Nobility (Spanish: Nobleza baturra) is a 1965 Spanish musical film directed by Juan de Orduña. It is a remake of the 1935 film Nobleza baturra.

== Cast ==
- Manuel Arbó
- Pedro Azorín
- Joaquín Bergía
- Julia Caba Alba
- Antonio Canal
- Alfonso de Córdoba
- Julia Delgado Caro
- Irán Eory as María del Pilar
- Margarita Esteban
- Alfredo Landa as Perico
- Miguel Ligero as Padre Juanico
- José Moreno as Marco
- Elisa Méndez
- Luis Orduña
- Vicente Parra as Sebastián
- Mary Paz Pondal as Andrea
- Roberto Rey
- Antonio Taño
- Elena María Tejeiro

== Bibliography ==
- Mira, Alberto. Historical Dictionary of Spanish Cinema. Scarecrow Press, 2010.
