= Pedro Nava =

Pedro Nava may refer to:

- Pedro Nava (writer), Brazilian writer
- Pedro Nava (politician), California State Assemblyman
