= Pedro Larrañaga =

Pedro Larrañaga may refer to:

- Perico Larrañaga (1885–1909), Spanish footballer
- Pedro Larrañaga (actor) (1887–1944), Spanish actor
- Pedro Larrañaga (professor), Spanish computer science professor
- Pedro Larrañaga (producer), Spanish screenwriter and theatrical producer
