= Carnival Figures =

1926 film

- Directed by: Florián Rey
- Written by: Miguel Echegaray (zarzuela); Florián Rey
- Produced by: Ignacio Bauer
- Cinematography: Alberto Arroyo
- Music by: Manuel Fernández Caballero
- Production company: Atlántida Films
- Release date: 1926
- Country: Spain
- Languages: Silent; Spanish intertitles

Carnival Figures (Spanish:Gigantes y cabezudos) is a 1926 Spanish silent film directed by Florián Rey.

== Cast ==
- Manuel Alares
- Miguel Fleta]
- Flores Galán
- José María Jimeno
- Braulio Lausín 'Gitanillo de Ricla' as Bullfighter
- Francisco Martí
- Antonio Mata
- Guillermo Muñoz
- José Nieto
- Agripina Ortega
- Marina Torres
- Luis Vela]
- Telmo Vela
- Carmen Viance

== Bibliography ==
- Eva Woods Peiró. White Gypsies: Race and Stardom in Spanish Musical Films. U of Minnesota Press, 2012.
