= Valencian Rose =

1926 film

- Directed by: Mario Roncoroni
- Written by: Fernando Miranda (poem); Federico Miñana (poem); Mario Roncoroni
- Produced by: Luís Ventura
- Starring: Carmen Viance
- Cinematography: José María Maristany; Giuseppe Sessia
- Production company: Levantina Films
- Release date: 1926
- Country: Spain
- Languages: Silent; Spanish intertitles

Valencian Rose (Spanish: Rosa de Levante) is a 1926 Spanish silent film directed by Mario Roncoroni and starring Carmen Viance.

== Cast ==
- Gaspar Campos
- Rafael Hurtado
- Joaquín Mora
- José Mora
- Josefa Quevedo
- Elisa Ruiz Romero
- Carmen Viance

== Bibliography ==
- Bentley, Bernard. A Companion to Spanish Cinema. Boydell & Brewer 2008.
