= Sulpicio =

Sulpicio may refer to:

- Sulpicius (Sulpicio in Spanish), the Roman name
  - Saint-Sulpice (disambiguation) (San Sulpicio)
    - Sister San Sulpicio (disambiguation)
- Doña Paz, formerly named Don Sulpicio, a Philippine passenger ferry
- Sulpicio Lines, a Philippine shipping line
