= Marta Flores =

Spanish actress

- Born: 18 January 1913; Madrid, Spain
- Died: 18 February 2005 (aged 92); Barcelona, Spain
- Other name: Marta Mateos de Paz
- Occupation: Actress
- Years active: 1937-2002 (film)

Marta Flores (1913–2005) was a Spanish actress who appeared in more than ninety productions during her lengthy career. During the 1930s and 1940s Flores was a leading lady in films like Romeo and Juliet and she later switched to playing smaller character roles.

== Selected filmography ==
- Los héroes del barrio (1937)
- Usted tiene ojos de mujer fatal (1939)
- Romeo and Juliet (1940)
- El 13.000 (1941)
- El sobre lacrado (1941) - Romualda
- Goyescas (1942) - Pepa, La Gitana
- Melodías prohibidas (1942)
- Cuando pasa el amor (1943)
- Piruetas juveniles (1944) - Angela, la madre di Stella
- Cero en conducta (1945)
- Se le fue el novio (1945) - Isabel
- La hija del circo (1945)
- Ramsa (1946)
- El castillo de Rochal (1946)
- Alma baturra (1948)
- La casa de las sonrisas (1948) - Susana
- Don Juan de Serrallonga (1949) - Amiga de Juana en baile
- Life in Shadows (1949) - Esposa
- ¿Milagro en la ciudad? (1957)
- La muralla (1958) - amiga de Matilde
- La tirana (1958) - Marquesa
- Un vaso de whisky (1959) - Extranjera
- Miss Cuplé (1959) - Amalia Escuder
- Sangue na Arena (1959) - Monja
- El emigrante (1960) - Marquesa
- El amor empieza en sábado (1961) - Florette
- No dispares contra mí (1961) - Madame de la fiesta
- La mentira tiene cabellos rojos (1962) - Invitada de la fiesta
- That Man in Istanbul (1965) - Lady in Casino
- El hijo de Gabino Barrera (1965)
- Tumba para un forajido (1965) - Madre de Frank
- El terrible de Chicago (1967) - Mrs. Brown
- La 'mini' tía (1968) - Madre del niño
- Elisabet (1968)
- Turistas y bribones (1969) - Marquesa
- El señorito y las seductoras (1969) - Madre en gasolinera
- Veinte pasos para la muerte (1970) - Sra. Fox
- ¿Quién soy yo? (1970) - Mujer del prefecto
- Investigación criminal (1970)
- Rain for a Dusty Summer (1971) - Margarita
- Una cuerda al amanecer (1972)
- Horror Story (1972) - Comisaria
- La otra imagen (1973)
- Aborto criminal (1973)
- Los Kalatrava contra el imperio del karate (1974) - Secretaria de rodaje
- Emma, puertas oscuras (1974) - Srta. Evans
- Chicas de alquiler (1974) - Jefa de la agencia
- Larga noche de julio (1974) - Empleada de la taquilla
- La dynamite est bonne à boire (1974)
- El último proceso en París (1974) - Portera
- El asesino de muñecas (1975) - Invitada de la fiesta
- Yo fui el rey (1975) - Dueña de la casa
- Guapa, rica y... especial (1976) - Señora 1ª
- Long Vacations of 36 (1976) - Mujer
- La nueva Marilyn (1976) - Mujer que ayuda a Teresa
- La ciutat cremada (1976)
- La perversa caricia de Satán (1976) - 1st Lady Guest
- Vivir a mil (1976) - Dueña casa de citas
- Una prima en la bañera (1976)
- Sexy... amor y fantasía (1977) - María
- Las alegres chicas de 'El Molino' (1977) - Tía de Christa
- Fraude matrimonial (1977) - Luisa (uncredited)
- El despertar de los sentidos (1977)
- Perros callejeros (1977) - Familiar de Isabel
- La viuda andaluza (1977)
- Borrasca (1978) - Esposa del alcalde
- Óscar, Kina y el láser (1978) - Pueblerina
- Cuarenta años sin sexo (1979) - Mujer de Agapito (uncredited)
- Companys, procés a Catalunya (1979) - Senyora Cua
- Sensitività (1979) - Marta - Lillian's aunt
- Los bingueros (1979) - Mujer velatorio 2 (uncredited)
- La verdad sobre el caso Savolta (1980) - Vecina (uncredited)
- Viaje al más allá (1980) - Sor Clara
- Neumonía erótica y pasota (1981) - Pitonisa
- Barcelona sur (1981)
- Una rosa al viento (1984) - Cocinera
- Yo, 'El Vaquilla' (1985) - Monja
- El lío de papá (1985) - Ramona
- La joven y la tentación (1986)
- Crónica sentimental en rojo (1986) - Dueña del bar
- Mordiendo la vida (1986) - La Trueno
- Andalucía chica (1988)
- El aire de un crimen (1988) - Dueña de la pensión
- Cásate conmigo, Maribel (2002) - Dña. Mercedes (final film role)

== Bibliography ==
- Davies, Anthony & Wells, Stanley. Shakespeare and the Moving Image: The Plays on Film and Television. Cambridge University Press, 1994.
