= The House of Rain =

1943 film

- Directed by: Antonio Román
- Written by: Wenceslao Fernández Flórez (novel); Pedro de Juan; Antonio Román
- Starring: Luis Hurtado; Blanca de Silos; Carmen Viance; Nicolás D. Perchicot
- Cinematography: Heinrich Gartner
- Edited by: Juan J. Doria
- Music by: José Muñoz Molleda
- Production company: Hércules Films
- Distributed by: Hércules Films
- Release date: 4 October 1943
- Running time: 88 minutes
- Country: Spain
- Language: Spanish

The House of Rain (Spanish: La casa de la lluvia) is a 1943 Spanish drama film directed by Antonio Román and starring Luis Hurtado, Blanca de Silos and Carmen Viance. It is set in Galicia. It is based on a novel by Wenceslao Fernández Flórez.

== Cast ==
- Luis Hurtado as Fernando Amil
- Blanca de Silos as Lina
- Carmen Viance as Teresa Amil
- Nicolás D. Perchicot as Elías Morell
- Rafaela Satorrés as Marina
- Manuel de Juan as Loquero 1
- Antonio Bayón as Criado
- Luis Latorre as Director del manicomio
- Antonio L. Estrada as Loquero 2
- José Ocaña as Ventero

== Bibliography ==
- Bentley, Bernard. A Companion to Spanish Cinema. Boydell & Brewer 2008.
