= Agustina of Aragon (1929 film) =

1929 film

- Directed by: Florián Rey
- Written by: Florián Rey
- Produced by: Luis Ventura
- Cinematography: Alberto Arroyo; Carlos Pahissa
- Production company: Victoria Producción Nacional
- Distributed by: Cinematográfica Almira
- Release date: 11 February 1929
- Country: Spain
- Languages: Silent; Spanish intertitles

Agustina of Aragon (Spanish:Agustina de Aragón) is a 1929 Spanish silent historical film directed by Florián Rey. It portrays the story of Agustina of Aragon, the heroine of the Spanish War of Independence against Napoleon. Another film portrayal of her Agustina of Aragon was released in 1950.

== Cast ==
- Santiago Aguilar
- José María Alonso Pesquera
- Adolfo Bernáldez
- María Luz Callejo
- Fernando Fernández de Córdoba
- Alfredo Hurtado
- José María Jimeno
- Ramón Meca
- Jesús Peña
- Carlos Rufart
- Manuel San Germán
- Alfonso Solá
- Marina Torres

== Bibliography ==
- Klossner, Michael. The Europe of 1500-1815 on Film and Television: A Worldwide Filmography of Over 2550 Works, 1895 Through 2000. McFarland & Company, 2002.
