= The Mendez Women =

1927 film

- Directed by: Fernando Delgado
- Written by: Fernando Delgado
- Starring: Carmen Viance
- Cinematography: Enrique Blanco
- Production company: RAFE
- Release date: 16 April 1927
- Country: Spain
- Languages: Silent; Spanish intertitles

The Mendez Women (Spanish: Las de Méndez) is a 1927 Spanish silent drama film directed by Fernando Delgado and starring Carmen Viance. It is now considered a lost film.

== Cast ==
- Isabel Alemany
- Manuel Aliacar
- Alfredo Corcuera
- Miguel del Castillo
- Juan Espejo
- Juana Espejo
- Fernando Fernández de Córdoba
- Eduardo García Maroto
- Francisco Martí
- José Mata
- Lina Moreno
- Víctor Pastor
- Javier de Rivera
- Clotilde Romero
- Carmen Tejada
- Tomás Venegas
- Carlos Verger
- Carmen Viance

== Bibliography ==
- Bentley, Bernard. A Companion to Spanish Cinema. Boydell & Brewer 2008.
