= Goyescas (film) =

1942 film directed by Benito Perojo

- Directed by: Benito Perojo
- Written by: Fernando Periquet; Antonio Quintero; Luis de Vargas; Benito Perojo
- Starring: Imperio Argentina; Rafael Rivelles; Armando Calvo; Marta Flores
- Cinematography: Michel Kelber; Cecilio Paniagua
- Edited by: Petra de Nieva
- Music by: Enric Granados; José Muñoz Molleda
- Release date: 9 October 1942
- Running time: 102 minutes
- Country: Spain
- Language: Spanish

Goyescas is a 1942 Spanish musical film directed by Benito Perojo and starring Imperio Argentina, Rafael Rivelles and Armando Calvo. The film is an adaptation of the 1916 zarzuela Goyescas by Enrique Granados, and also drew inspiration from the work of the artist Francisco Goya. The film was part of the popular trend for operetta films in Europe during the era. Perojo had been planning the production for around a decade before it was ultimately made.

The film received the Biennale Award at the 1942 Venice Film Festival.

== Synopsis ==
Set in Madrid, between the end of the 18th century and the beginning of the 19th. The Countess of Gualda and the famous songwriter Petrilla are very physically similar, so much so that many people confuse them. But one day they discover that they love the same man, the Marquis of Nuévalos, a terrible rivalry will arise between them that they will resolve based on songs and episodes that recreate Goya's paintings.

== Cast ==
- Imperio Argentina as Petrilla / Condesa de Gualda
- Rafael Rivelles as Fernando Pizarro
- Armando Calvo as Luis Alfonso de Nuévalos
- Manolo Morán as Dueño del mesón
- Marta Flores as Pepa, La Gitana
- Juan Calvo as Bandido 1
- Xan das Bolas as Miguel
- Ramón Martori as Corregidor
- Antonio Casas as Paquiro
- José Latorre as Ministro
- Manuel Requena as Ventero
- Eloísa Muro as Reina
- María Vera as Maja
- Marina Torres as Doncella de la condesa
- Antonio Bayón as Bandido 2
- Carmen Ponce de León as Mujer

== Bibliography ==
- Bentley, Bernard. A Companion to Spanish Cinema. Boydell & Brewer 2008.
