= Javier de Rivera =

Spanish actor and film director

- Born: 1902 (age 123–124); Las Palmas, Spain
- Occupations: Director, Actor
- Years active: 1921-1949 (film)

Javier de Rivera (born 1902) was a Spanish actor and film director. He appeared in over thirty films, including the 1926 silent Malvaloca. He directed two films in the 1940s.

== Selected filmography ==
- Heart of Gold (1923)
- Malvaloca (1926)
- The Mendez Women (1927)
- El mejor tesoro (1966)
- Dick Turpin (1974)

== Bibliography ==
- Goble, Alan. The Complete Index to Literary Sources in Film. Walter de Gruyter, 1999.
