= Life in Shadows =

- Directed by: Lorenzo Llobet Gràcia
- Written by: Victorio Aguado; Lorenzo Llobet Gràcia
- Starring: Fernando Fernán Gómez; María Dolores Pradera; Isabel de Pomés
- Cinematography: Salvador Torres Garriga
- Edited by: Ramón Biadiú
- Music by: Jesús García Leoz
- Production company: Castilla Films
- Release date: 6 April 1949
- Running time: 90 minutes
- Country: Spain
- Language: Spanish

Life in Shadows (Spanish:Vida en sombras) is a 1949 Spanish drama film directed by Lorenzo Llobet Gràcia and starring Fernando Fernán Gómez, María Dolores Pradera and Isabel de Pomés. It was made in Barcelona.

== Plot ==
Carlos, born in a fair booth related to cinema, and author of an amateur film when he was fourteen years old, becomes a professional camera operator, since his entire life has been marked by that art .

He married Ana, to whom he proposed during a screening of Romeo and Juliet. When the Civil War breaks out, he separates from his wife to film some shots of the conflict and she dies in a shootout. To escape his remorse, he decides to become a war reporter, and after the end of the war he falls into depression, coming to hate cinema.

== Cast ==
- Fernando Fernán Gómez as Carlos
- María Dolores Pradera as Ana
- Isabel de Pomés as Clara
- Fernando Sancho as Productor
- Alfonso Estela as Luis
- Graciela Crespo as Sra. Durán
- Félix de Pomés as Señor Durán
- Mary Santpere as Doncella
- Marta Flores as Esposa
- Miquel Graneri as Marido
- Jesús Puche as Fotógrafo
- Valero as Carlos, niño
- Juan López as Luis, niño
- Antonia Llobet as Ana, niña
- Antonio Leal as Comandante
- Tomás Gutiérrez Larraya as Vendedor de Films Selectos
- Hernández as Otor vendedor
- Joaquín Soler Serrano as (voice)
- Enrique Tusquets as Hombre del puro
- Arturo Cámara as Comandante
- Camino Garrigó as Madre de Ana
- María Severini as Dueña de la pensión

== Bibliography ==
- Marsha Kinder. Blood Cinema: The Reconstruction of National Identity in Spain. University of California Press, 1993.
