= Mario Roncoroni =

Italian film director and director

- Occupations: Actor, Director
- Years active: 1912-1928 (film)

Mario Roncoroni was an Italian film actor and director active during the silent era. During the late 1920s he worked in the Spanish film industry.

== Selected filmography ==
=== Director ===
- Filibus (1915)
- Il medico delle pazze (1919)
- Saetta più forte di Sherlock Holmes (1921)
- The Ship (1921)
- Nostradamus (1925)
- Valencian Rose (1926)

== Bibliography ==
- Labanyi, Jo & Pavlović, Tatjana. A Companion to Spanish Cinema. John Wiley & Sons, 2012.
- Vacche, Angela Dalle. Diva: Defiance and Passion in Early Italian Cinema. University of Texas Press, 2008.
