= Rubber (1938 film) =

1938 film

- Directed by: Eduard von Borsody
- Written by: Franz Eichhorn; Eduard von Borsody; Ernst von Salomon
- Produced by: Ernst Krüger
- Starring: René Deltgen; Gustav Diessl; Herbert Hübner
- Cinematography: Edgar Eichhorn; Willy Winterstein
- Edited by: Ernst Nicklisch
- Music by: Werner Bochmann
- Production company: UFA
- Distributed by: UFA
- Release date: 1 November 1938
- Running time: 104 minutes
- Country: Germany
- Language: German

Rubber (German: Kautschuk) is a 1938 German historical adventure film directed by Eduard von Borsody and starring René Deltgen, Gustav Diessl and Herbert Hübner. It was shot at the Babelsberg Studios in Berlin and on location in Brazil. The film's sets were designed by the art directors Herbert Frohberg and Anton Weber. Unusually for a film produced by Nazi Germany it features a British hero, the explorer Henry Wickham.

== Cast ==
- René Deltgen as Henry Wickham
- Gustav Diessl as Don Alonzo de Ribeira
- Herbert Hübner as Konsul Waverley
- Vera von Langen as Mary, dessen Tochter
- Roma Bahn as Lady Betty Mortimer
- Valy Arnheim as Lord Reginald, ihr Gatte
- Hans Nielsen as Kapitän Murray
- Hans Mierendorff as Der Lordkanzler
- Walter Franck as Der Gouverneur von Para
- Walther Süssenguth as Der Capitano des Urwaldforts
- Karl Klüsner as Der Vorsitzende des Militärgerichts
- Ernst Rotmund as Der Capitano des Polizeibootes
- Friedrich Gnaß as Antonio, ein Vaquero
- José Alcántara as José, Wickhams Begleiter
- Paul Wagner as Sir Joseph Dalton Hocker
- Aribert Grimmer as Steuermann Wilkins
- Philipp Manning as Butler
- Robert Dorsay as Photograph an Bord
- Jac Diehl as Ein Offiziersbursche
- Katja Bennefeld as Girl
- Michael von Newlinsky as Ein Offizier im Urwaldfort

== Bibliography ==
- Klaus, Ulrich J. Deutsche Tonfilme: Jahrgang 1938. Klaus-Archiv, 1988.
- O'Brien, Mary-Elizabeth. Nazi Cinema as Enchantment. The Politics of Entertainment in the Third Reich. Camden House, 2006.
- Waldman, Harry. Nazi Films in America, 1933–1942. McFarland, 2008.
