= Florencia Bécquer =

Argentine-born Spanish film actress (1910–1994)

- Born: 9 June 1910; Resistencia, Argentina
- Died: 1994 (aged 83–84)
- Other name: Erna Florencia Becker
- Occupation: Actress
- Years active: 1925-1948 (film)

Florencia Bécquer (1910–1994) was an Argentine-born Spanish film actress.

== Filmography ==
- 1925: Corazón, o La vida de una modista
- 1926: Luis Candelas o El bandido de Madrid
- 1927: Malvaloca
- 1927: Sister San Sulpicio
- 1928: El médico a palos
- 1928: ¡Viva Madrid, que es mi pueblo!
- 1929: El gordo de navidad
- 1929: 48 pesetas de taxi
- 1933: Sobre el cieno
- 1940: Jai-Alai
- 1941: Oro vil
- 1942: Fortunato
- 1942: La aldea maldita
- 1943: Un caballero famoso
- 1944: Una herencia de París
- 1948: Charro a la fuerza

== Bibliography ==
- Bentley, Bernard. A Companion to Spanish Cinema. Boydell & Brewer 2008.
