= Heart of Gold (1923 film) =

1923 film

- Directed by: Manuel Noriega
- Written by: Carlos Arniches (play); Enrique García Álvarez (play); Sabino Antonio Micón; Manuel Noriega; Andrés Pérez de la Mota
- Cinematography: Enrique Blanco
- Music by: José Serrano
- Production company: Atlántida Films
- Release date: 1923
- Country: Spain
- Languages: Silent; Spanish intertitles

Heart of Gold (Spanish:Alma de Dios) is a 1923 Spanish silent film directed by Manuel Noriega and starring Irene Alba, Juan Bonafé and Elisa Ruiz Romero. It was remade in 1941 under the same title.

== Cast ==
- Irene Alba as Ezequiela
- Juan Bonafé as Matías
- Elisa Ruiz Romero as Eloísa
- María Fuster de Rusell
- Lia Emo de Echaide as Marcelina
- Javier de Rivera as Agustín
- Juan Nadal as Adrián
- Antonio Zaballos as Pelegrín
- Carmen Cremades as La gitana
- Santiago García
- Sita Iroz
- Ramón Meca
- Lina Moreno
- Maruja Retana
- Arturo Robles
- Emilio Ruiz Santiago
- Antonia Ruiz
- Manuel Russell

== Bibliography ==
- Bentley, Bernard. A Companion to Spanish Cinema. Boydell & Brewer 2008.
