= The Girl of Your Dreams (film) =

- Theatrical release poster
- Spanish: La niña de tus ojos
- Directed by: Fernando Trueba
- Written by: Rafael Azcona; Miguel Ángel Egea; Carlos López; David Trueba
- Produced by: Andrés Vicente Gómez; Cristina Huete; Eduardo Campoy
- Starring: Penélope Cruz; Antonio Resines; Neus Asensi; Jesús Bonilla; Loles León; Jorge Sanz; Rosa Maria Sardà; Santiago Segura
- Cinematography: Javier Aguirresarobe
- Edited by: Carmen Frías
- Music by: Antoine Duhamel
- Release date: 13 November 1998 (Spain)
- Running time: 121 minutes
- Country: Spain
- Languages: Spanish; German; Russian

The Girl of Your Dreams (Spanish: La niña de tus ojos) is a 1998 Spanish drama film produced and directed by Fernando Trueba. Set during the Spanish Civil War, it centers on a fictional Andalusian actress (Penélope Cruz) making a film in Nazi Germany who becomes the object of Joseph Goebbels' attention.

== Plot ==
In 1938, while Spain is in the grip of civil war, a film team from the territory held by Franco's rebels is invited to the co-production in Berlin of a musical set in 19th-century Andalusia, to be shot in separate Spanish and German versions. At first happy to be working away from their war-torn country, the group finds life under Nazism increasingly unpleasant and dangerous.

Macarena, their attractive star, soon catches the eye of Goebbels, the Minister of Public Enlightenment and Propaganda, who is determined to bed her. Though she finds him repulsive and prefers the company of Blas, the married director of the Spanish version, she is made clear that for the sake of the project and of Hispano-German relations she must comply.

When she points out that the extras in the film look ridiculously inauthentic, being tall and fair-haired, they are replaced by short dark Jewish and Romani prisoners from a concentration camp, under armed SS guards. An extra with whom she sympathises, a handsome Russian called Leo, escapes the guards and she smuggles him into the villa where Goebbels has installed her. When Goebbels calls round, Leo knocks him out cold.

Blas realises that this is the end of the road for the project and rushes to see Goebbels' wife, who is well aware of her husband's activities. She writes him a pass enabling Leo, Macarena and her dresser to board a plane that night. The fate of the rest of the group, under arrest, is unclear.

== Cast ==
- Penélope Cruz as Macarena Granada
- Antonio Resines as Blas Fontiveros
- Jorge Sanz as Julián Torralba
- Rosa Maria Sardà as Rosa Rosales
- Santiago Segura as Castillo
- Loles León as Trini Morenos
- Jesús Bonilla as Marco Bonilla
- Neus Asensi as Lucia Gandia
- Miroslav Táborský as Václav Passer
- Johannes Silberschneider as Goebbels
- Karel Dobry as Leo
- Götz Otto as Heinrich von Wermelskirch
- Hanna Schygulla as Magda Goebbels
- María Barranco as Ambassador's wife
- Juan Luis Galiardo as Ambassador

== Historical background ==
During the Civil War, filmmakers from the Nationalist side found work in Germany and Italy. For example, in 1938 at the UFA studios in Babelsberg, the Spanish director Florián Rey filmed Carmen, la de Triana ("Carmen, the girl from Triana") in Spanish and a German version called Andalusische Nächte ("Nights in Andalusia"), both starring the Argentine singer and actress Imperio Argentina with whom, according to legend, Hitler fell in love. She is reported to have sued the producers and director for using her life story without permission.

== Accolades ==
Year	Award / Film festival	Category	Recipient(s)	Result	Ref(s)
1999	1999 Goya Awards	Best Film		Won	
1999	1999 Goya Awards	Best Director	Fernando Trueba	Nominated	
1999	1999 Goya Awards	Best Actor	Antonio Resines	Nominated	
1999	1999 Goya Awards	Best Actress	Penélope Cruz	Won	
1999	1999 Goya Awards	Best Supporting Actor	Jorge Sanz	Nominated	
1999	1999 Goya Awards	Best Supporting Actress	Rosa Maria Sardá	Nominated	
1999	1999 Goya Awards	Best Original Screenplay	Miguel Ángel Egea and Carlos López	Nominated	
1999	1999 Goya Awards	Best New Actor	Miroslav Táborský	Won	
1999	1999 Goya Awards	Best Cinematography	Javier Aguirresarobe	Nominated	
1999	1999 Goya Awards	Best Editing	Iván Aledo	Nominated	
1999	1999 Goya Awards	Best Art Direction	Gerardo Vera	Won	
1999	1999 Goya Awards	Best Production Supervision	Angélica Huete	Won	
1999	1999 Goya Awards	Best Sound	Pierre Gamet, Dominique Hennequin & Santiago Thévenet	Nominated	
1999	1999 Goya Awards	Best Special Effects	Emilio Ruiz & Alfonso Nieto	Nominated	
1999	1999 Goya Awards	Best Costume Design	Sonia Grande & Lala Huete	Won	
1999	1999 Goya Awards	Best Makeup and Hairstlyes	Antonio Panizza & Gregorio Ros	Won	
1999	1999 Goya Awards	Best Original Score	Antoine Duhamel	Nominated	
1999	1999 Berlin International Film Festival	Golden Bear		Nominated	

== Sequel ==
A sequel, La reina de España (English: "The Queen of Spain"), starring Penélope Cruz and Jorge Sanz, was released on 25 November 2016.
