= Pastora Imperio =

Spanish actress

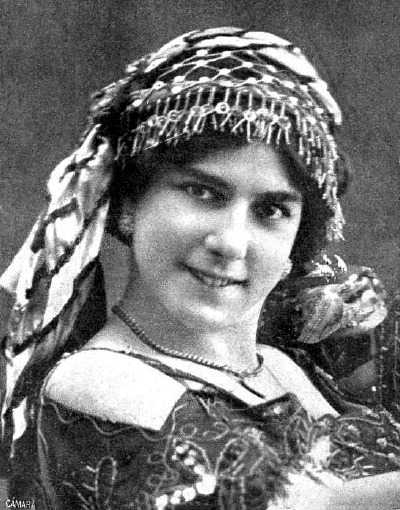
- Pastora Imperio, 1914
- Born: Pastora Rojas Monje; April 13, 1887; Seville
- Died: September 14, 1979 (aged 92); Madrid
- Resting place: Cementerio de San Justo
- Known for: Dancer and Actress
- Style: Flamenco

Pastora Rojas Monje (April 13, 1887, in Seville – September 14, 1979, in Madrid), known professionally as Pastora Imperio, was a dancer from Seville and one of the most representative figures of flamenco folklore of all time. She was the great-grandmother of the Spanish actress Pastora Vega.

== Biography ==
She was the daughter of Cádiz dancer Rosario Monje, "La Mejorana" (Spanish: the marjoram), and of Víctor Rojas, a tailor to bullfighters. Her brother, also called Víctor Rojas, who was a guitarist. At the age of ten, she began her artistic career and two years later she was known as Pastora Monje. Later she would be known as Pastora Rojas and finally as Pastora Imperio because she and Margarita la Retoña formed the musical duo "Hermanas Imperio.". Pastora Imperio stood out as one of the best artists of the time because of her repertoire.

Thanks to her personality, she was highly popular; she also earned the admiration of the intellectual and artistic world of the time. She became a muse for painters, poets and other artists, such as Julio Romero de Torres, who painted her portrait, or Mariano Benlliure, who was inspired by her figure to create one of his sculptures. Literary figures such as Ramón Díaz Mirete, Ramón Pérez de Ayala, Tomás Borrás and the Álvarez Quintero brothers, wrote about her. All of them highlighted her qualities and praised her as a great artist. She received many awards for her artistic career, among them the Lazo de Dama de la Orden de Isabel la Católica and the first gold medal of the Segunda Semana de Estudios Flamencos, celebrated in Málaga in 1964. She was also a friend of Queen Victoria Eugenia and had a signed photo of Alfonso XIII.

== Artistic career ==
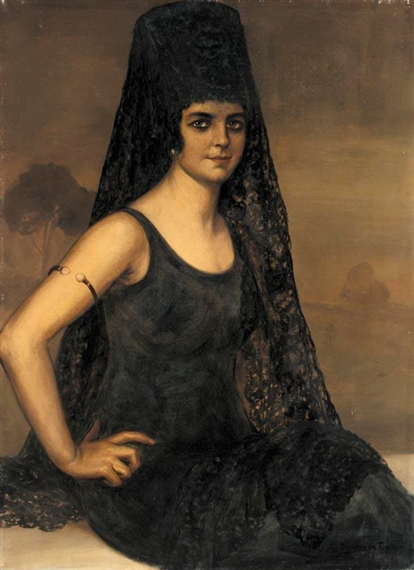
Pastora Imperio by Julio Romero de Torres (1913)

The garrotín and the soleares were the main flamenco palos that Pastora Imperio performed during her professional career. Her style of moving her arms and hands, with soft turns and rounded strokes went down in history as a paradigm of good flamenco braceo. Because she stood out mainly as a dancer. Pastora Imperio also made the bata de cola fashionable as a typical outfit for this dance.

Around 1905, she took a place among the stars of the zarzuela genre, as a companion of La Fornarina, La Bella Chelito and Amalia Molina. In 1912 she performed at the Teatro Romea (Madrid) and the Teatro La Latina. In 1914 she traveled to Paris and then crossed the Atlantic to perform in Cuba, Argentina, and Mexico, among other American countries.

Her fame as an artist came when she starred in the premiere of El amor brujo, by Manuel de Falla, on April 15, 1915, at the Teatro Lara in Madrid, and all thanks to Jacinto Benavente, who contacted Manuel de Falla.

El amor brujo by Manuel de Falla, written expressly for Pastora Imperio

On February 14, 1917, she performed for the King and Queen of Spain on the occasion of a celebration in favor of the Red Cross.

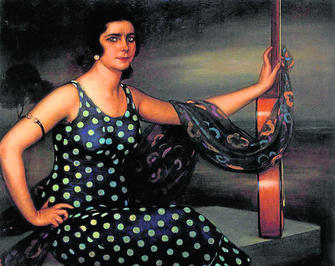
Pastora Imperio by Julio Romero de Torres (1922)

After a period of retirement, Pastora Imperio returned to the stage in 1934. She reappears at the Coliseum in Madrid performing the pasodoble Retrato lírico, a work by Álvaro Retana and José Casanova for the occasion. Another version of El amor brujo was also premiered at the Teatro Español in the same place, with the participation of great artists such as La Argentina, Vicente Escudero and Miguel de Molina. Carmen's granddaughter, El color de mis ojos and the pasodoble ¡Viva Madrid! were other wonderful creations that Pastora Imperio performed, making them part of her own repertoire.

Music historian Gilbert Chase wrote in 1941: "The greatest of modern Spanish flamenco dancers, Pastora Imperio, walked in such a way that it was said she had received this gift from God and out of it had made a new art--that of walking."

During the period between 1942 and 1954, except for a brief collaboration with the dancer Pilar López in 1946, she ran the venta La Capitana, a place frequented by various artists and owned by the bullfighter Gitanillo de Triana. In 1957 she participated in the premiere of Dónde vas Alfonso XII, by Luca de Tena, at the Teatro Lara, and in 1958 she was also part of a show by Luis Escobar entitled Te espero en Eslava.

She retired permanently in 1959, after a series of performances in Barcelona. Once retired, she founded in Madrid, together with her son-in-law Rafael Vega de los Reyes, the tablao El Duende, and in 1964 she opened another one in Marbella (Málaga), Los Monteros.

== Filmography ==
She participated in several films throughout her career: La danza fatal (1914); La reina de una raza (1917); María de la O (1936); La marquesona (1940); Canelita en rama (1943); El amor brujo (1949); and Duelo en la cañada (1959).

== Family ==
She married the famous bullfighter Rafael Gómez Ortega El Gallo ("the rooster"), on 20 February 1911 in the Church of San Sebastián in Madrid. The marriage lasted less than a year before the pair separated, although they would remain legally married until divorce was allowed under the new Constitution of the Second Republic. Nevertheless, Rafael Gómez recognized Pastora's daughter Rosario Gómez Rojas (born 1920), giving the child his last name, even though she was actually the daughter of Fernando de Borbon y Madán, Duke of Dúrcal, and cousin of Alfonso XIII. Fernando de Borbon had offered to recognise the child, but Pastora declined, wishing to avoid a scandal.

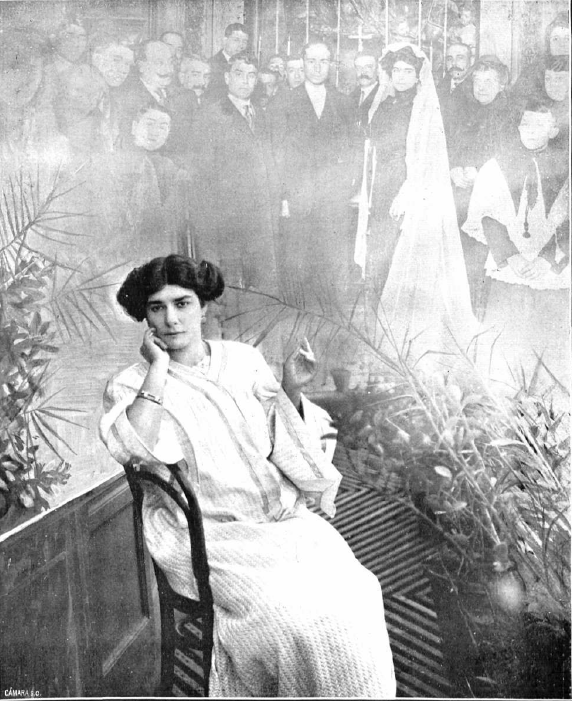
Composite image of Pastora Imperio with her wedding in the background.

Rosario "la Borbona" would go on to marry bullfighter Rafael Vega de los Reyes, "el Gitanillo de Triana" (Spanish: The Little Gypsy of Triana), in 1937. He was the younger brother of bullfighter Fernando "Gitanillo de Triana" who had died in 1931 from his bullfighting injuries. Together Rosario and Rafael had five children: Curro, Carmen, Pastora, Rafael and Charo.

Imperio's great-grandchildren include actress Pastora Vega, and singer Héctor Dona, who collaborated on a biography about Imperio.

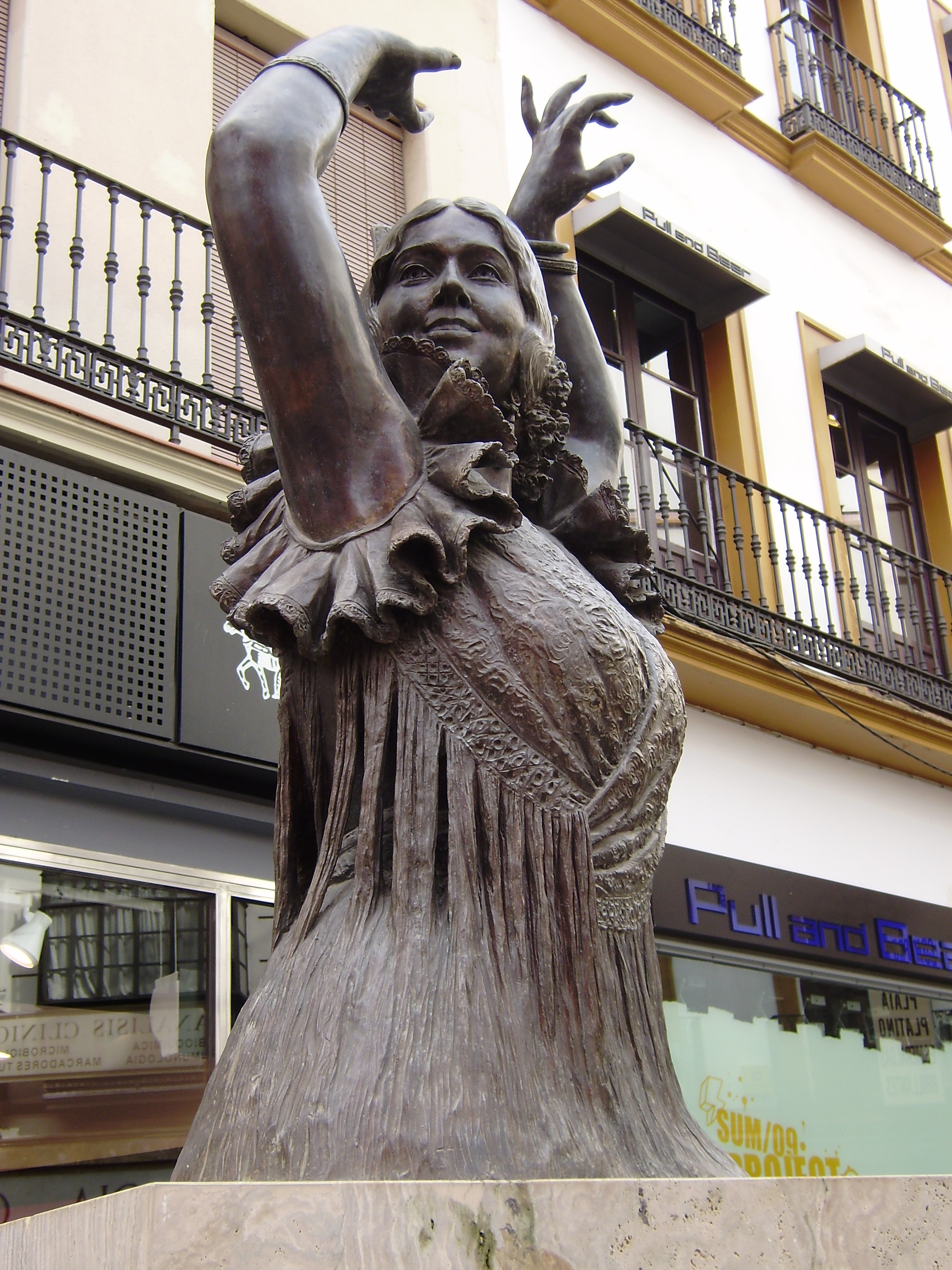
Monument to Pastora Imperio in Seville (Spain)

== Death and legacy ==
Pastora Imperio died in Madrid on September 14, 1979, at the age of 92.

The Duchess of Alba financed a statue in her honour. The Monumento a Pastora Imperio, depicting the artist dancing with her arms in the air, was created by the sculptor Luis Álvarez Duarte. The bronze statue was dedicated on 14 February 2006 and is located at the intersection of Velázquez and O'Donnell streets in the centre of Seville. During the opening ceremony her relatives were very grateful for the location chosen for the monument because from there "Pastora could see every year the procession of the Christ of the Great Power".

The Wax Museum of Barcelona has a statue of her.

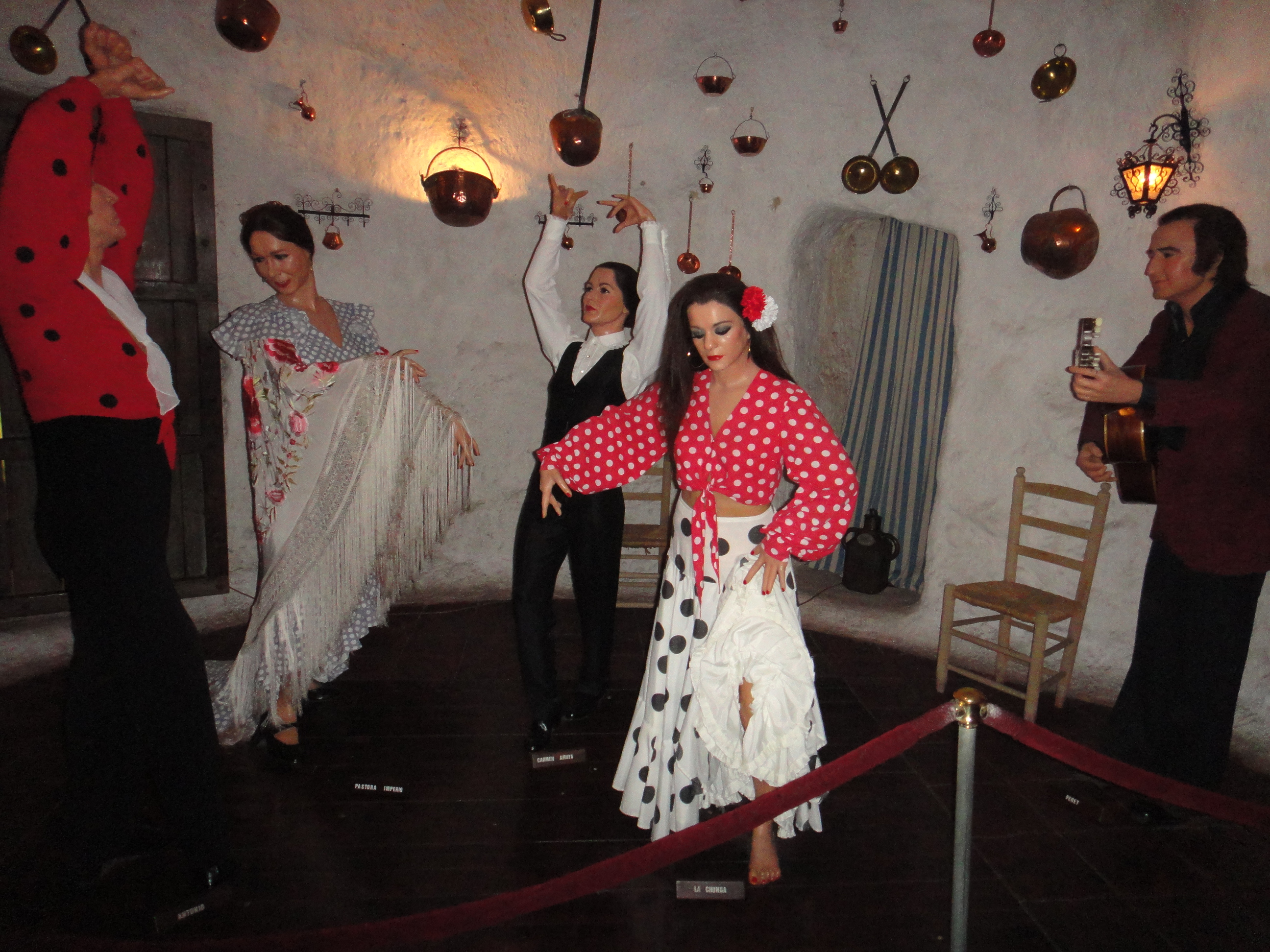
Wax Museum of Barcelona: Carmen Amaya (centre), La Chunga (right) and Pastora Imperio (left).

== Works ==
She is the subject of a biography by Madrid journalist María Estévez; Reina del Duende: La vida, los amores y el arte de una mujer apasionada, Pastora Imperio (Queen of Duende: The life, the loves, and the art of a passionate woman, Pastora Imperio).
