= Carmen, la de Triana =

1938 film

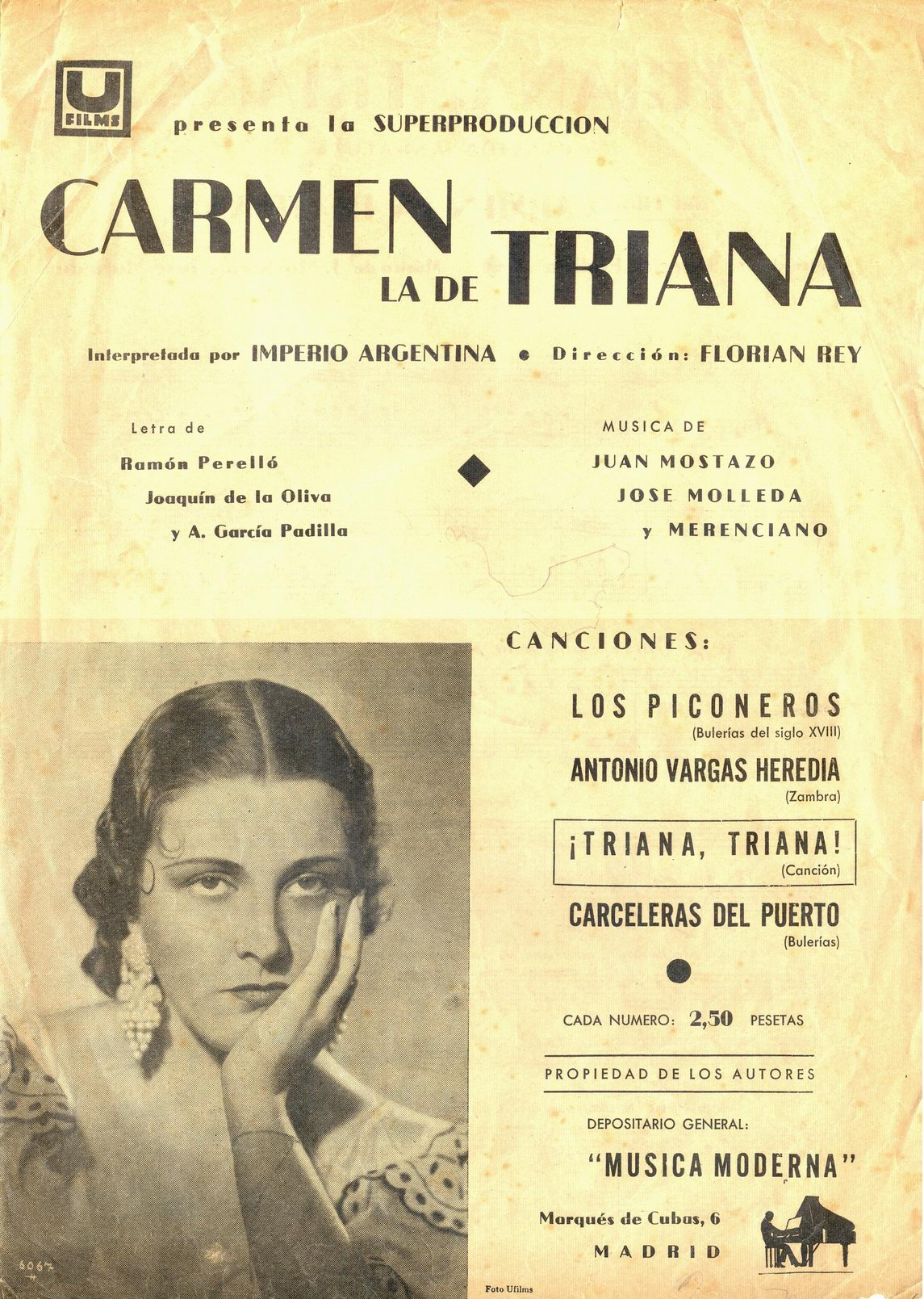
- Release date: 1938
- Countries: Spain; Germany

Carmen, la de Triana (Carmen, the girl from Triana) is a 1938 Spanish/German musical film directed by Florián Rey and starring Imperio Argentina, Rafael Rivelles and Manuel Luna. It was a Spanish-language version of the 1938 film Nights in Andalusia based on the opera Carmen by Georges Bizet.

Triana is a neighbourhood of Seville.

== Plot ==
The movie takes place in Seville in 1835. Carmen, a young gypsy woman, intends to enter the barracks to give Antonio Vargas Heredia some tobacco. Thanks to a favor from Brigadier José, she gets to see the “torero”. In return Carmen offers the soldier the carnation in her hair. But not without informing everyone that she will sing at Mulero's tavern that night. José comes to see her. While Carmen sings, another woman steals the carnation José was given by the gipsy earlier.

== Cast ==
- Imperio Argentina as Carmen
- Rafael Rivelles as José Navarro
- Manuel Luna as Antonio Vargas Heredia
- Pedro Fernández Cuenca as Juan
- Pedro Barreto as Salvador
- Margit Symo as Dolores
- Alberto Romea as Comandante Ramirez
- J. Noé de la Peña as Triqui
- José Prada as Dargento Garcia
- Anselmo Fernández as Miguel
- Juan Laffita Díaz as Mulero
- Julio Roos as Capitán Moraleda
- Ramón Montoya as Guitarrista
- Carlos Montoya as Guitarrista

== Influence ==
This Spanish version and the parallel German version are an inspiration for the 1998 Spanish film The Girl of Your Dreams.
