= Juan Simón's Daughter (1935 film) =

- Directed by: José Luis Sáenz de Heredia
- Written by: Nemesio M. Sobrevila
- Produced by: Luis Buñuel
- Starring: Angelillo; Pilar Muñoz; Carmen Amaya
- Cinematography: José María Beltrán
- Edited by: Monique Lacombe
- Production company: Filmófono
- Release date: 16 December 1935
- Running time: 95 minutes
- Country: Spain
- Language: Spanish

Juan Simón's Daughter (Spanish:La hija de Juan Simón) is a 1935 Spanish musical drama film directed by Nemesio M. Sobrevila and José Luis Sáenz de Heredia. It is based on the musical play La hija de Juan Simón by Sobrevila. A second film version Juan Simón's Daughter was released in 1957.

== Cast ==
- Angelillo as Ángel
- Pilar Muñoz as Carmen
- Carmen Amaya as Soledad
- Manuel Arbó as Juan Simón
- Ena Sedeño as Angustias
- Porfiria Sanchíz as La Roja
- Fernando Freyre de Andrade as Don Paco
- Emilio Portes as Don Severo
- Baby Daniels as Cupletista
- Julián Pérez Ávila as The Physician
- Pablo Hidalgo as Curro
- Palanca as Cantaor
- Emilia Iglesias as Ángel's mother
- Cándida Losada as Trini
- Felisa Torres as Celes
- Rafaela Aparicio as Gregoria
- Luis Buñuel
- Luisa Sala

== Bibliography ==
- Eva Woods Peiró. White Gypsies: Race and Stardom in Spanish Musical Films. U of Minnesota Press, 2012.
