= Malibran's Song =

1951 film

- Directed by: Luis Escobar
- Written by: Luis Escobar
- Cinematography: Jules Kruger
- Edited by: Francisco García Velázquez
- Music by: Jesús García Leoz
- Production company: Sagitario Films
- Distributed by: Europa Films
- Release date: 5 October 1951
- Running time: 95 minutes
- Country: Spain
- Language: Spanish

Malibran's Song (Spanish: La canción de La Malibrán) is a 1951 Spanish historical musical film directed by Luis Escobar. It is based on the life of the nineteenth century singer Maria Malibran.

== Plot ==
When María marries she abandons her singing career. But when his husband is in financial difficulties she will sing again, soon becoming worldwide famous.

== Cast ==
- María de los Ángeles Morales as María Felicia
- Carlos Agostí
- Fernando Aguirre
- Mariano Alcón
- Gabriel Algara
- Rafael Alonso
- Matilde Artero
- Félix Briones
- Julia Caba Alba
- Rafael Calvo Agostí
- Adela Carboné
- Benito Cobeña
- Damián de Fez
- Carlos Díaz de Mendoza
- Chano Gonzalo
- Luis Hurtado
- Concha López Silva
- Mercedes Manero
- Arturo Marín
- Pilar Muñoz
- Enrique Raymat
- Raquel Rodrigo
- Diana Salcedo
- José Villasante
- Juan Vázquez

== Bibliography ==
- de España, Rafael. Directory of Spanish and Portuguese film-makers and films. Greenwood Press, 1994.
