= Saint-Sulpice =

Saint-Sulpice or Saint Sulpice may identify:

== People ==
- Sulpicius Severus, known as Saint Sulpice (c. 360–c. 420), who wrote the earliest biography of Saint Martin of Tours
- Sulpitius the Pious, known as Saint Sulpice, who died around 646 AD
- Sulpitius I of Bourges the Severe (died 591)
- Sulpice de Bayeux 9th Century Bishop of Bayeux
- General Raymond-Gaspard de Bonardi de Saint-Sulpice, who fought during the Napoleonic Wars

== Places ==
=== Belgium ===
- Church of Saint-Sulpice, Jumet, a church in Jumet, section of Charleroi

=== Canada ===
- Saint-Sulpice, Quebec, a municipality
- Saint-Sulpice (Montreal), a district in the borough of Ahuntsic-Cartierville in Montreal

=== France ===
- Abbaye de Saint-Sulpice des Bois, in the Ille-et-Vilaine department, Brittany
- Church of Saint-Sulpice, Paris, a church in central Paris
  - Place Saint-Sulpice, a large square next to the church
- Église Saint-Sulpice de Saint-Vigor-le-Grand in the Calvados department, Normandy
- Saint-Sulpice, Ain, in the Ain department
- Saint-Sulpice, Haute-Saône, in the Haute-Saône department
- Saint-Sulpice, Lot, in the Lot department
- Saint-Sulpice, Maine-et-Loire, in the Maine-et-Loire department
- Saint-Sulpice, Mayenne, in the Mayenne department
- Saint-Sulpice, Nièvre, in the Nièvre department
- Saint-Sulpice, Oise, in the Oise department
- Saint-Sulpice (Paris Metro), a subway station in Paris
- Saint-Sulpice, Puy-de-Dôme, in the Puy-de-Dôme department
- Saint-Sulpice, Savoie, in the Savoie department
- Saint-Sulpice, Tarn, in the Tarn department
- Blaison-Saint-Sulpice, in Maine-et-Loire department
- Saint-Sulpice-d'Arnoult, in the Charente-Maritime department
- Saint-Sulpice-de-Cognac, in the Charente department
- Saint-Sulpice-de-Faleyrens, in the Gironde department
- Saint-Sulpice-de-Favières, in the Essonne department
- Saint-Sulpice-de-Grimbouville, in the Eure department
- Saint-Sulpice-de-Guilleragues, in the Gironde department
- Saint-Sulpice-de-Mareuil, in the Dordogne department
- Saint-Sulpice-de-Pommeray, in the Loir-et-Cher department
- Saint-Sulpice-de-Pommiers, in the Gironde department
- Saint-Sulpice-de-Roumagnac, in the Dordogne department
- Saint-Sulpice-de-Royan, in the Charente-Maritime department
- Saint-Sulpice-de-Ruffec, in the Charente department
- Saint-Sulpice-des-Landes, Ille-et-Vilaine, in the Ille-et-Vilaine department
- Saint-Sulpice-des-Landes, Loire-Atlantique, in the Loire-Atlantique department
- Saint-Sulpice-des-Rivoires, in the Isère department
- Saint-Sulpice-d'Excideuil, in the Dordogne department
- Saint-Sulpice-en-Pareds, in the Vendée department
- Saint-Sulpice-et-Cameyrac, in the Gironde department
- Saint-Sulpice-la-Forêt, in the Ille-et-Vilaine department
- Saint-Sulpice-la-Pointe, in Tarn department
- Saint-Sulpice-Laurière, in the Haute-Vienne department
- Saint-Sulpice-le-Dunois, in the Creuse department
- Saint-Sulpice-le-Guérétois, in the Creuse department
- Saint-Sulpice-les-Bois, in the Corrèze department
- Saint-Sulpice-les-Champs, in the Creuse department
- Saint-Sulpice-les-Feuilles, in the Haute-Vienne department
- Saint-Sulpice-le-Verdon, in the Vendée department
- Saint-Sulpice-sur-Lèze, in the Haute-Garonne department
- Saint-Sulpice-sur-Risle, in the Orne department

=== Switzerland ===
- Saint-Sulpice, Neuchâtel
- Saint-Sulpice, Vaud

== See also ==
- Society of Saint-Sulpice (the Sulpitians), a Catholic religious order
- Sister San Sulpicio (disambiguation)
- Sulpicio (disambiguation)
- Sulpicius
