= Karl Klüsner =

German actor (1905–1960)

- Born: 2 August 1905; Kiel, German Empire
- Died: 25 July 1960 (aged 54); Wannsee, West Berlin, West Germany
- Occupation: Film actor
- Years active: 1938–1956

Karl Klüsner (1905–1960) was a German film actor.

== Selected filmography ==
- Nights in Andalusia (1938)
- The Sensational Casilla Trial (1939)
- Rubber (1938)
- Legion Condor (1939)
- City in the Fog (1950)
- The Plot to Assassinate Hitler (1955)
- Before God and Man (1955)
