= Carmen Carbonell =

Spanish actress

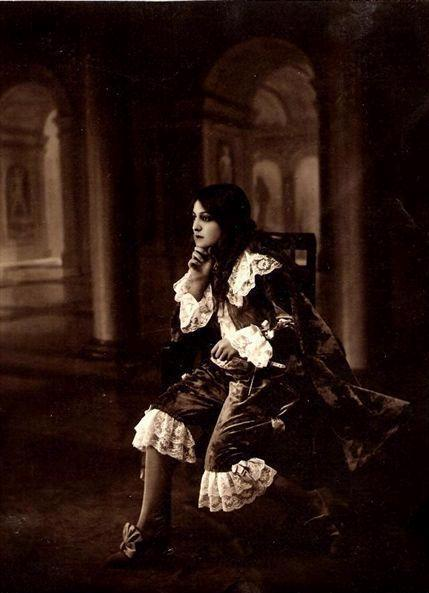
- Carbonell in 1917.
- Born: Carmen Carbonell Nonell; 19 March 1900; Spain
- Died: 27 November 1988 (aged 88); Barcelona, Spain
- Occupation: Actress
- Years active: 1919–1982 (film)

Carmen Carbonell Nonell (1900–1988) was a Spanish stage and film actress. She received the National Theater Award twice, in 1950 and 1980.

== Selected filmography ==
- Fortunato (1942)
- The Miracle of Marcelino (1955)
- The Desperate Ones (1967)

== Bibliography ==
- Eva Woods Peiró. White Gypsies: Race and Stardom in Spanish Musical Films. U of Minnesota Press, 2012.
