= Manuel San Germán =

Spanish actor

- Occupation: Actor
- Years active: 1923–1931 (film)

Manuel San Germán was a Spanish actor. He appeared in seventeen films during his career, including the 1926 silent film Malvaloca.

== Selected filmography ==
- Malvaloca (1926)
- Agustina of Aragon (1929)

== Bibliography ==
- Goble, Alan. The Complete Index to Literary Sources in Film. Walter de Gruyter, 1999.
