= Marina Torres =

Spanish actress

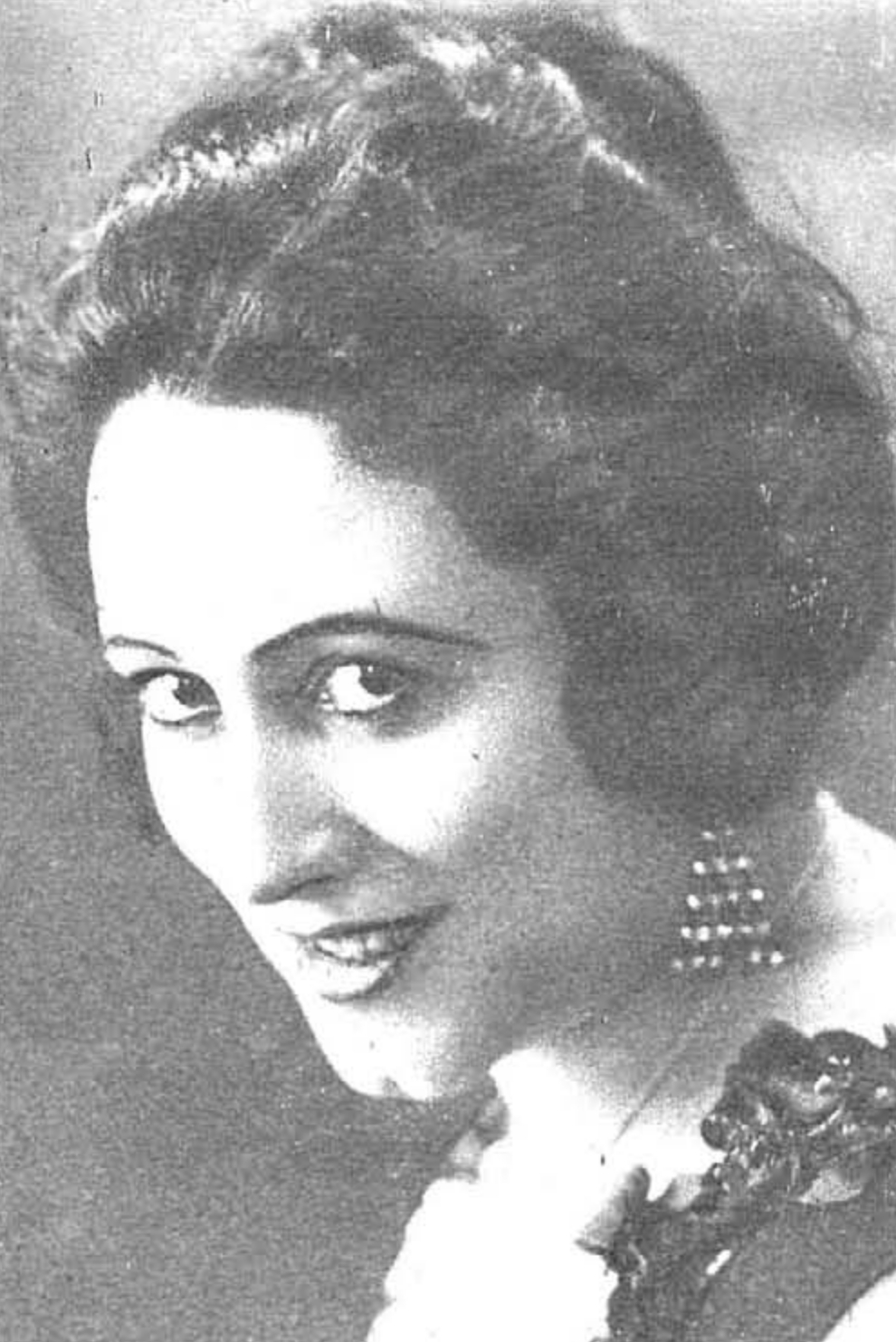
- Born: 31 August 1901; Barcelona, Spain
- Died: 12 April 1967 (aged 65); Madrid, Spain
- Occupation: Actress
- Years active: 1917-1951 (film)

Marina Torres (1901–1967) was a Spanish stage and film actress.

== Selected filmography ==
- Daughter of the Sea (1917)
- Carnival Figures (1926)
- The Village Priest (1927)
- Agustina of Aragon (1929)
- Goyescas (1942)
- Lola Leaves for the Ports (1947)
- Service at Sea (1951)

== Bibliography ==
- Goble, Alan. The Complete Index to Literary Sources in Film. Walter de Gruyter, 1999.
