= El mejor tesoro =

- Directed by: Gregorio Almendros
- Screenplay by: Gregorio Almendros; H.S. Valdés
- Story by: Gregorio Almendros; H.S. Valdés
- Cinematography: Raúl Artigot
- Edited by: Francisco Jaumandreu
- Music by: Federico Moreno Torroba
- Production company: Cadencia Films
- Release date: 1966
- Running time: 77 min

El mejor tesoro is a 1966 Spanish black and white film directed by Gregorio Almendros.

== Cast ==
- Luis Barbán
- Fernando Bilbao
- Sofía Casares
- Genaro Galindo
- Rafael Hernández
- Antonio Jiménez Escribano
- Ángel Jordán
- José Riesgo
- Javier de Rivera
- Ana Valdi
