= Fortunato (film) =

1942 film

- Directed by: Fernando Delgado
- Written by: Fernando Delgado; Joaquín Álvarez Quintero (play); Serafín Álvarez Quintero (play)
- Produced by: Miguel Pereyra
- Starring: Antonio Vico; Carmen Carbonell; Florencia Bécquer
- Cinematography: Carlos Pahissa; Enzo Riccioni
- Edited by: Mariano Pombo
- Music by: Jesús García Leoz
- Production company: P.B. Films
- Release date: 2 February 1942
- Running time: 77 minutes
- Country: Spain
- Language: Spanish

Fortunato is a 1942 Spanish comedy film directed by Fernando Delgado and starring Antonio Vico, Carmen Carbonell and Florencia Bécquer. It was made in the style of an Italian White Telephone film.

== Cast ==
- Antonio Vico as Fortunato
- Carmen Carbonell as Rosario
- Florencia Bécquer as Amaranta
- Anselmo Fernández as Victorio
- Manuel San Román as Alberto
- José Alburquerque as Maître
- Esteban Lehoz as Tenor
- María Luisa Arias as Constanza
- Joaquina Carreras as Remedios
- Pablo Hidalgo as Cabo de Comparsas
- Mariano Alcón as Sabatino
- Pedro Chicote as Glotter
- Luisa Jerez as Inés
- Esmeralda de Seslavine as Tiple
- Emilio Santiago
- Antonio P. Soriano
- Luis Alonso Murillo
- Pastora Peña

== Bibliography ==
- Bentley, Bernard. A Companion to Spanish Cinema. Boydell & Brewer 2008.
