= Malvaloca (1926 film) =

1927 film

- Directed by: Benito Perojo
- Written by: Joaquín Álvarez Quintero (play); Serafín Álvarez Quintero (play); Benito Perojo
- Starring: Lidia Gutiérrez; Manuel San Germán; Javier de Rivera
- Cinematography: Georges Asselin
- Production company: Goya Producciones Cinematográficas
- Release date: 1927
- Country: Spain
- Languages: Silent; Spanish intertitles

Malvaloca is a 1927 Spanish silent drama film directed by Benito Perojo and starring Lidia Gutiérrez, Manuel San Germán and Javier de Rivera. It is an adaptation of the 1912 play of the same title.

== Cast ==
- Lidia Gutiérrez as Rosa 'Malvaloca'
- Manuel San Germán as Leonardo
- Javier de Rivera as Salvador
- Joaquín Carrasco as Jeromo
- Florencia Bécquer as Juanela
- Lina Moreno as Hermana Piedad
- Juan Manuel Figuera as Padre de la hija de Malvaloca
- Carlos Verger as Lobito
- Amalia Molina
- Alfredo Hurtado

== Bibliography ==
- Peiró, Eva Woods. White Gypsies: Race and Stardom in Spanish Musical Films. University of Minnesota Press, 2012.
