= Service at Sea =

- Directed by: Luis Suárez de Lezo
- Written by: Rafael de Aguilar; Alfredo Echegaray; Luis Suárez de Lezo; Manuel Tamayo
- Produced by: Felipe Gerely
- Cinematography: Willy Goldberger
- Edited by: Antonio Martínez
- Music by: Emilio Lehmberg
- Production companies: Agrupacine; Filmófono
- Distributed by: Filmófono
- Release date: 21 May 1951
- Running time: 91 minutes
- Country: Spain
- Language: Spanish

Service at Sea (Spanish: Servicio en la mar) is a 1951 Spanish war film directed by Luis Suárez de Lezo.

== Cast ==
- Rafael Bardem as Don León
- José Luis Brugada as Luis Hurtado
- Rafael Calvo as Padre de Sara
- Antonio Casas as Jaime
- Antonio Criado as Alférez de submarino
- Ángel Córdoba as Cabo de radio
- Enrique Guitart as Comandante
- Fernando Heiko Vassel as Capitán mercante
- Luis Induni as Oficial mercante
- José Isbert as Don José
- Carolina Jiménez as Ana María
- Quico Juanes as Niño
- Julia Lajos as Tía Isabel
- Tony Leblanc as Santiago 'El Andaluz'
- Nati Mistral as Cancionista
- Mercedes Muñoz Sampedro as Madre de Sara
- Francisco Pierrá as Almirante
- Julio Riscal as Santiago 'El Gallego'
- Fernando Sancho as Don Tofol
- Dina Sten as Sara
- Marina Torres
- Dante Tulián as Segundo comandante
- Félix Briones as Fogonero
- Jacinto San Emeterio as Camarero
- Alfonso Santacana as Timonel
- Gérard Tichy as Pasajero
- José Uribarri as Criado

== Bibliography ==
- Bentley, Bernard. A Companion to Spanish Cinema. Boydell & Brewer 2008.
