= Miguel Ligero (Spanish actor) =

Spanish actor

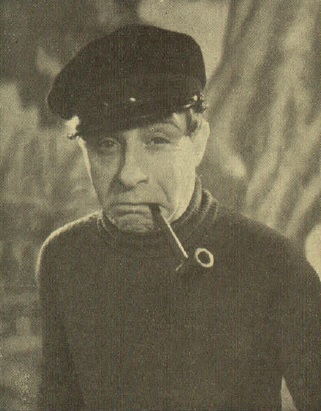
- Miguel Ligero in Rumbo al Cairo in 1935
- Born: Miguel Ligero Rodríguez; 21 October 1890; Madrid, Spain
- Died: 26 January 1968 (aged 77); Madrid, Spain
- Burial place: Cementerio de la Almudena
- Occupation: Actor
- Years active: 1926-1968
- Spouse: Blanca Pozas Oliveira
- Children: Blanca; Luis

Miguel Ligero Rodríguez (21 October 1890 – 26 January 1968) was a Spanish actor. Films include La hermana San Sulpicio (1934), El novio de mamá (1934), Nobleza baturra (1935) Morena Clara (1936), El rey de las finanzas (1944), Morena Clara (1954) and La verbena de la Paloma (1963). He also had several roles as a character actor in Hollywood Spanish-language films.

== Selected filmography ==
- World Crisis (1934)
- Sister San Sulpicio (1934)
- Bound for Cairo (1935)
- The Barber of Seville (1938)
- Sighs of Spain (1939)
- The Reluctant Hero (1941)
- It Happened in Damascus (1943)
- Malvaloca (1954)
- La cruz de mayo (1955)
- The Moorish Queen (1955)
- Fountain of Trevi (1960)
- Queen of The Chantecler (1962)
- La verbena de la Paloma (1963)
- Aragonese Nobility (1965)
