= The Village Priest (1927 film) =

1927 film

- Spanish: El cura de aldea
- Directed by: Florián Rey
- Written by: Carlos de Arpe; Florián Rey
- Based on: The Village Priest by Enrique Pérez Escrich
- Cinematography: Carlos Pahissa
- Production company: Atlántida Films
- Release date: 14 February 1927
- Country: Spain
- Languages: Silent; Spanish intertitles

The Village Priest (Spanish: El cura de aldea) is a 1927 Spanish silent drama film directed by Florián Rey.

== Cast ==
- Manuel Alares
- Leo de Córdoba
- Luis Infiesta
- Alfonso Orozco
- Rafael Pérez Chaves
- Carmen Rico
- Elisa Ruiz Romero
- Marina Torres
- Constante Viñas
