= The Cursed Village (1942 film) =

- Directed by: Florián Rey
- Written by: Florián Rey
- Starring: Florencia Bécquer; Julio Rey de las Heras; Victoria Franco
- Cinematography: Heinrich Gärtner
- Edited by: Gaby Peñalba
- Production company: P.B. Films
- Distributed by: Chamartín
- Release date: 23 November 1942
- Running time: 88 minutes
- Country: Spain
- Language: Spanish

The Cursed Village (Spanish: La aldea maldita) is a 1942 Spanish drama film directed by Florián Rey and starring Florencia Bécquer, Julio Rey de las Heras and Victoria Franco. A remake of an earlier silent film of the same title, it was a popular box office success It was awarded as medal at the 1942 Venice Film Festival.

== Plot ==
The events take place in the town of Luján in Salamanca at the beginning of the 20th century. Due to a series of weather misfortunes for several years in a row, the town finds itself in a situation of poverty and misery that forces its inhabitants to emigrate to the city in search of a job that mitigates their problems; Juan, a farmer in a good situation, is forced, along with his sharecroppers and servants, to do the same, leaving his wife and son in the village; but his wife, Acacia, decides to leave too; not with him, but by another path that will lead her to prostitution and degradation; After a while Juan returns to the village and recovers his situation and his wealth; Acacia also returns, but turned into a beggar whom Juan's shepherds recognize; he goes to look for her and returns her home after forgiving her slips.

== Cast ==
In alphabetical order

- Florencia Bécquer
- Julio Rey de las Heras
- Victoria Franco
- Pablo Hidalgo
- Delfín Jerez
- Agustín Laguilhoat
- Alicia Romay
- José Sepúlveda

== Bibliography ==
- Bentley, Bernard. A Companion to Spanish Cinema. Boydell & Brewer 2008.
