= Pedro Larrañaga (actor) =

Spanish actor (1887–1944)

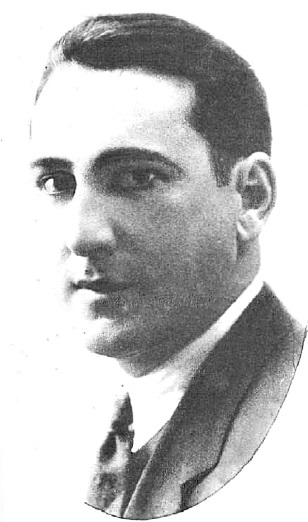
- Larrañaga in 1928
- Born: Pedro Larrañaga y Ruiz-Gómez; 27 April 1887; Avilés, Spain
- Died: 23 November 1944 (aged 57); Sevilla, Spain
- Citizenship: Spanish
- Occupation: Actor
- Works: The Cursed Village
- Spouse: María Ladrón de Guevara ()
- Children: 3
- Relatives: Carlos Larrañaga Onzalo (father); Carlos Larrañaga (son)

Pedro Larrañaga y Ruiz-Gómez (27 April 1887 – 23 November 1944) was a Spanish actor in the 1920s and 1930s.

== Early and personal life ==
Pedro Larrañaga was born on 27 April 1887 in Avilés, as the son of Carlos Larrañaga y Onzalo, a native of Motrico and the first president of the Avilés Chamber of Commerce, who had settled in Avilés in 1880. He married María Ladrón de Guevara, with whom he had at least one son, Carlos.

== Career ==
Larrañaga left his homeland of Asturias to pursue a career in acting, making his debut in 1926 under Florián Rey at El Pilluelo de Madrid together with Elisa Ruiz Romero. He then performed El conde Maravillas (1926) and Rosa de Madrid (1927), doing so together with Conchita Dorado and Carmen Toledo. In 1928, he performed again for Florián Rey in Águilas de Acero together with Elita Panquer, and then played the protagonist of Zalacaín el Aventurero de Pío Baroja, directed by Francisco Camacho. He obtained his greatest success in 1929, the year in which he starred in the most important film by Florián Rey and of all Spanish silent production, La aldea maldita (The Cursed Village). In this version, the first of the novel by Armando Palacio Valdés, he gave life to the character of Juan de Castilla.

Larrañaga did not manage to achieve the same level of success in talkies, and thus his participation in them gradually faded away, despite some appearances in international co-productions. Richard Harlan directed him in 1933 in an argument written by Wenceslao Fernández Flores, Odio (Hate), where he featured alongside his wife María Ladrón de Guevara. He also appeared with her in 1943 in Rosas de Otoño (Autumn Roses), directed by Juan de Orduña.

== Death ==
Larrañaga died on 23 November 1944 in Seville, at the age of 53.

== Filmography ==
- El Pilluelo de Madrid (1926)
- El conde Maravillas (1927)
- Rosa de Madrid (1927)
- The Cursed Village (1930)
- Hate (1933)
- I don't want, I don't want (1939)
- Autumn Roses (1943)
