= Bound for Cairo =

- Directed by: Benito Perojo
- Written by: Alfredo Miralles; Edgar Neville; Benito Perojo
- Starring: Miguel Ligero; María del Carmen Merino; Rafael Calvo
- Cinematography: Tamás Keményffy; Fred Mandel; Tony Quemently
- Music by: Jacinto Guerrero
- Production company: Cifesa
- Distributed by: Cifesa
- Release date: 1935
- Running time: 79 minutes
- Country: Spain
- Language: Spanish

Bound for Cairo (Spanish: Rumbo al Cairo) is a 1935 Spanish musical comedy film directed by Benito Perojo and starring Miguel Ligero and María del Carmen Merino. The film was produced by the largest Spanish company Cifesa, and was patterned after successful Hollywood films of the same kind. It has been described as one of the most accomplished Spanish films of the period. The journey of the title ends happily in Majorca, some way short of the intended destination of Cairo.

== Cast ==
- Miguel Ligero as Quique
- Ricardo Núñez as Jaime Noriega
- María del Carmen Merino as Celia
- Carlos Díaz de Mendoza as Tono Cienfuegos
- José Calle as El gobernador
- Rafael Calvo as El tabernero

== Bibliography ==
- Bentley, Bernard. A Companion to Spanish Cinema. Boydell & Brewer 2008. ISBN 978-1855661769
- Hortelano, Lorenzo J. Torres. Directory of World Cinema: Spain. ISBN 978-1841504636 Intellect Books, 2011.
