= Sister San Sulpicio (novel) =

1889 novel by Armando Palacio Valdés

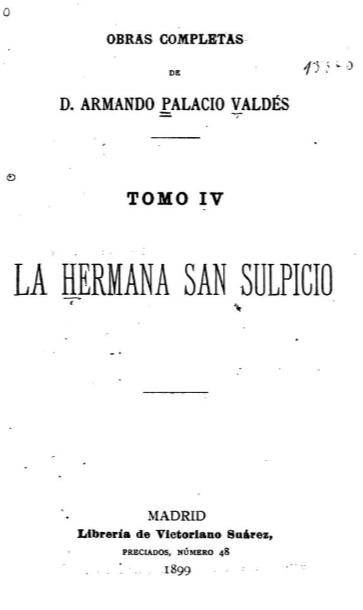
- Title page for La hermana San Sulpicio (1899 edition)
- Author: Armando Palacio Valdés
- Original title: La hermana San Sulpicio
- Language: Spanish
- Publication date: 1889
- Publication place: Spain
- Media type: Print

Sister San Sulpicio (Spanish: La hermana San Sulpicio) is an 1889 novel by the Spanish writer Armando Palacio Valdés.

== Film adaptations ==
It has been turned into films on four separate occasions:

- Sister San Sulpicio (1927 film), a silent film directed by Florián Rey
- Sister San Sulpicio (1934 film), a sound film directed by Florián Rey
- Sister San Sulpicio (1952 film), a sound film directed by Luis Lucia
- The Rebellious Novice, a 1971 musical film adaptation

== Bibliography ==
- Goble, Alan. The Complete Index to Literary Sources in Film. Walter de Gruyter, 1 Jan 1999.
