= Daughter of the Sea (1917 film) =

- Directed by: Adrià Gual
- Written by: Fructuós Gelabert; Adrià Gual; Àngel Guimerà (play)
- Cinematography: Fructuós Gelabert; José María Maristany
- Production company: Barcinógrafo
- Release date: 1917
- Country: Spain
- Languages: Silent; Spanish intertitles

Daughter of the Sea (Spanish: La hija del mar) is a 1917 Spanish silent film directed by Adrià Gual. It was based on a play by Àngel Guimerà which was later remade as a sound film in 1953.

== Cast ==
- Mercedes Baró
- Modesto Santaularia
- Marina Torres

== Bibliography ==
- Bentley, Bernard. A Companion to Spanish Cinema. Boydell & Brewer 2008.
