= Saint-Sulpice-de-Grimbouville =

- Commune
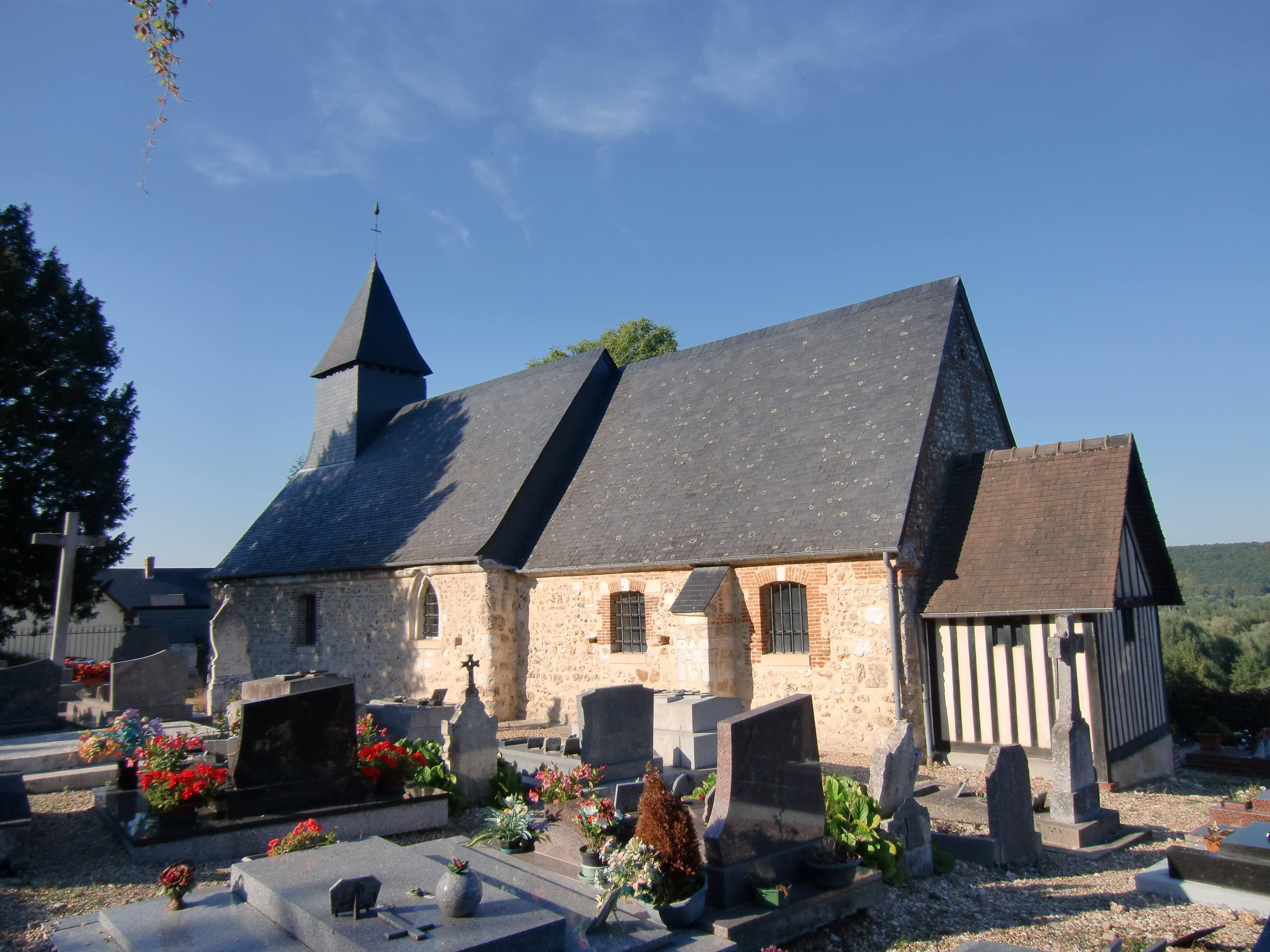
- The church in Saint-Sulpice-de-Grimbouville
- Location of Saint-Sulpice-de-Grimbouville
- Location within France Location within Normandy
- Coordinates: 49°22′39″N 0°26′50″E
- Country: France
- Region: Normandy
- Department: Eure
- Arrondissement: Bernay
- Canton: Beuzeville

Government
  - Mayor (2020–2026): Alain Gesbert
- Area^{1}: 4.32 km^{2} (1.67 sq mi)
- Elevation: 84 m (276 ft)
- Highest elevation: 121 m (397 ft)
- Lowest elevation: 1 m (3.3 ft)
- Population (2023): 161
  - Density: 37.3/km^{2} (96.5/sq mi)
- Time zone: UTC+01:00 (CET)
  - Summer (DST): UTC+02:00 (CEST)
- INSEE/Postal code: 27604 /27210
- ^{1} French Land Register data, which excludes lakes, ponds, glaciers > 1 km^{2} (0.386 sq mi or 247 acres) and river estuaries.

Saint-Sulpice-de-Grimbouville (French pronunciation: [sɛ̃ sylpis də ɡʁɛ̃buvil], before 1991: Saint-Sulpice-de-Graimbouville) is a commune in the Eure department in Normandy in northern France.

== Population ==
Historical population
| Year | Pop. | ±% p.a. |
|---|---|---|
| 1968 | 83 | — |
| 1975 | 95 | +1.95% |
| 1982 | 136 | +5.26% |
| 1990 | 159 | +1.97% |
| 1999 | 142 | −1.25% |
| 2007 | 174 | +2.57% |
| 2012 | 182 | +0.90% |
| 2017 | 167 | −1.71% |
| 2023 | 161 | −0.61% |
Source: INSEE

== See also ==
- Communes of the Eure department
