= María del Carmen Merino =

Spanish film actress

- Occupation: Actress
- Years active: 1934-1939 (film)

María del Carmen Merino was a Spanish film actress. Carmen Merino, the daughter of a Madrid taxi driver briefly became a star after securing a contract with the leading Spanish studio Cifesa. She appeared in the 1935 musical comedy Bound for Cairo.

== Selected filmography ==
- Bound for Cairo (1935)

== Bibliography ==
- Bentley, Bernard. A Companion to Spanish Cinema. Boydell & Brewer 2008.
