= Sister San Sulpicio (1927 film) =

1927 film

- Directed by: Florián Rey
- Written by: Armando Palacio Valdés (novel); Florián Rey
- Starring: Imperio Argentina
- Cinematography: José María Beltrán
- Production company: Perseo Films
- Release date: 1927
- Country: Spain
- Languages: Silent; Spanish intertitles

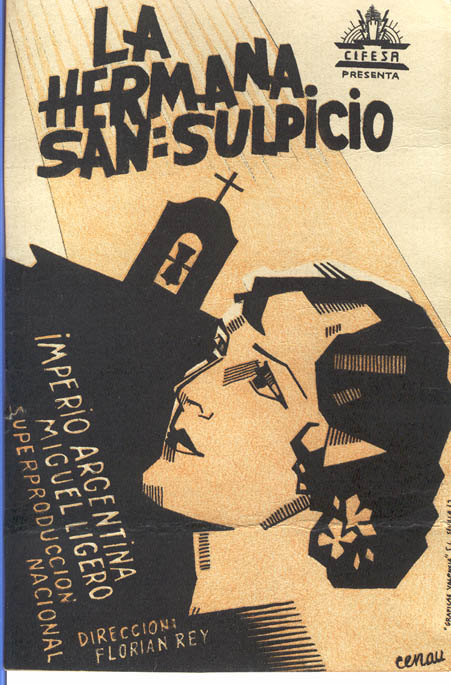
Film poster, 1934

Sister San Sulpicio (Spanish:La hermana San Sulpicio) is a 1927 Spanish silent comedy film directed by Florián Rey and starring Imperio Argentina. It was based on Armando Palacio Valdés's 1889 novel Sister San Sulpicio. In 1934 Rey remade it as a sound film again starring Argentina.

== Cast ==
- María Anaya
- Imperio Argentina as Gloria / Hermana San Sulpicio
- Florencia Bécquer
- Carmen Fernández Mateu
- Guillermo Figueras
- Ramón Meca
- Ricardo Núñez
- Modesto Rivas
- Pilar Torres
- Evaristo Vedia

== Bibliography ==
- Goble, Alan. The Complete Index to Literary Sources in Film. Walter de Gruyter, 1 January 1999.
