= Amalia Molina =

Spanish tonadillera and dancer

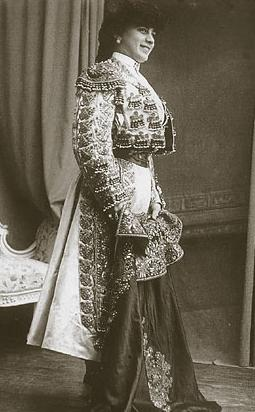
Amalia Molina in 1906

Amalia Molina (Seville, 1881 - Barcelona, July 8, 1956) was a popular Spanish tonadillera and dancer. Raised in Triana, she moved at a young age to Madrid, where she debuted at the age of 17. Her career took her to Latin America and even Broadway. In Paris she premiered in the opera, Goyescas. She starred in the film, Malvaloca (1926). She was married from 1904 to Trelles del Busto.
