= Carmen Viance =

Spanish actress

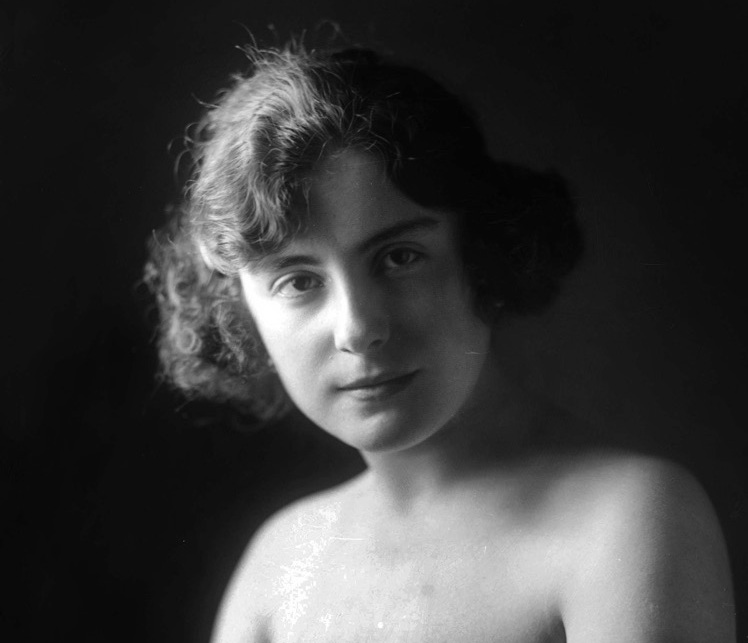
- Viance in 1929
- Born: 21 June 1905; Madrid, Spain
- Died: 24 July 1985 (aged 80); Madrid, Spain
- Occupation: Actress
- Years active: 1924-1953 (film)

Carmen Viance (June 21, 1905 – July, 1985) was a Spanish actress who appeared in twenty films between 1924 and 1943, including the 1927 silent film The Mendez Women.

== Selected filmography ==
- Carnival Figures (1926)
- Valencian Rose (1926)
- The Mendez Women (1927)
- The Cursed Village (1930)
- Currito of the Cross (1936)
- The House of Rain (1943)
