= The Song of Aixa =

- German poster
- Spanish: La canción de Aixa
- Directed by: Florián Rey
- Written by: Manuel de Góngora; Florián Rey
- Produced by: Johann W. Ther
- Starring: Imperio Argentina
- Cinematography: Karl Puth; Hans Scheib
- Edited by: Willy Zeyn
- Music by: Federico Moreno Torroba
- Production company: Hispano Filmproduktion
- Release date: 8 April 1939
- Running time: 96 minutes
- Countries: Germany; Spain
- Language: Spanish

The Song of Aixa or Aixa's Song (Spanish: La canción de Aixa) is a 1939 German-Spanish musical drama film directed by Florián Rey and starring Imperio Argentina. It is set in Spanish Morocco.

== Plot ==
Cousins Abslam and Hamed, who share progressive views, put an end to a longstanding feud between their families. While visiting a café, Hamed introduces Abslam to Aixa, a young dancer. Abslam quickly falls in love with her, becoming so preoccupied with his feelings that he neglects his governmental duties. He eventually proposes marriage to Aixa, only to discover that she is in love with Hamed.

== Cast ==
- Imperio Argentina as Aixa
- Pedro Barreto as José
- Pedro Fernández Cuenca as Ben Darir
- Anselmo Fernández as Ali
- Pablo Hidalgo as Maestro
- Manuel Luna as Abslam
- Ricardo Merino as Hamed
- Mari Paz Molinero as Zohira
- Nicolás D. Perchicot as Amar
- José Prada as Larbi
- Rafaela Satorrés as Zaida

== Bibliography ==
- Bentley, Bernard. A Companion to Spanish Cinema. Boydell & Brewer 2008.
