= Nobleza baturra =

- Theatrical film poster
- Directed by: Florián Rey
- Written by: Joaquín Dicenta Boadillo
- Starring: Imperio Argentina; Miguel Ligero Rodríguez; Juan de Orduña; José Calle; Manuel Luna; Juan Espantaleón; Carmen de Lucio; Pilar Muñoz
- Cinematography: Enrique Guerner; José María Torres
- Edited by: Eduardo García Maroto
- Music by: Rafael Martínez and José L. de Rivera
- Release date: 1935
- Running time: 86 minutes
- Country: Spain
- Language: Spanish

Nobleza baturra (The Nobility of the Peasantry, also known as Aragonese Virtue) is a 1935 Spanish musical drama film directed by Florián Rey, and starring Imperio Argentina, Miguel Ligero Rodríguez, and Juan de Orduña. It is based on the play of the same name by Joaquín Dicenta. The film was a phenomenal success, and was one of the most commercially successful films of the Second Republic. The film was produced by CIFESA at CEA Studios. It was noted for its sentimental view of rural people, and its folklorish characters.

== Plot ==
In Aragon in the early twentieth century, María del Pilar, an honest girl, is affected when a former suitor, out of spite of being rejected, publicises throughout the village that she had engaged in extramarital sex. This rumour soon spreads throughout the region.

== Cast ==
- Imperio Argentina as María del Pilar
- Miguel Ligero Rodríguez as Perico
- Juan de Orduña as Sebastián
- José Calle as Tío Eusebio
- Manuel Luna as Marco
- Carmen de Lucio as Filomena
- Pilar Muñoz as Andrea
- Juan Espantaleón as Padre Juanico
- Blanca Pozas as Doña Paula
