= Imperio Argentina =

Argentine singer and actress (1906–2003)

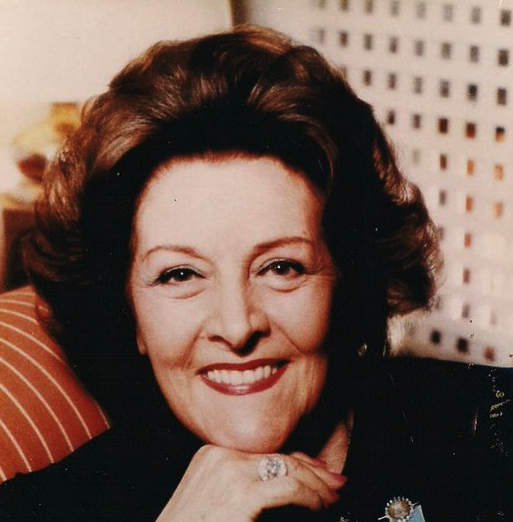
- Argentina in 1992
- Born: María Magdalena Nile del Río; 26 December 1906; Buenos Aires, Argentina
- Died: 22 August 2003 (aged 96); Benalmádena, Málaga, Spain
- Other name: Pettit Imperio
- Citizenship: Argentine (by birth), Spanish (from 1999)
- Occupations: Actress, singer
- Years active: 1920s–1990s
- Spouse(s): Ramón Baillo (m. 1946–1948; dissolved); Florián Rey (m. 1934–1939; dissolved); 1 child
- Partner(s): Joaquín Goyanes; 1 child
- Children: 2, including Florián Antonio Martínez Nile

Imperio Argentina (born Magdalena Nile del Río; 26 December 1906[1] – 2003) was an Argentine-born Spanish actress and singer who became one of the biggest stars of Spanish cinema during the Second Republican period. She achieved mainstream stardom after being cast by director Florián Rey in the 1927 silent film Sister San Sulpicio.

Throughout her career, she starred in films directed by Spanish filmmakers such as Benito Perojo and Robert Florey, ultimately receiving an Honorary Goya Award in recognition of her institutional impact on Spanish cinema. She remained culturally active until her later years, publishing her autobiography, Malena Clara, in 2001, before dying in Málaga at the age of 97.

== Early life and career ==
She was born to Antonio Nile (a guitar player, born in Gibraltar) and Rosario del Río (a native of Monda in the Province of Málaga). She performed on stage in Argentina. At that time, her stage name was Pettit Imperio. In Spain, she changed her name to Imperio Argentina to honor Argentina. She obtained Spanish citizenship in 1999.

The name was named in honor of the flamenco dancer Pastora Imperio. She began starring in Spanish cinema during the Second Spanish Republic after Florián Rey selected her to star in Sister San Sulpicio (1827), a movie adaptation of Armando Palacio Valdés's novel of the same name. Then she continued her career with Rey on Los claveles de la virgen (1928) and Restless Hearts, directed by Benito Perojo and Gustav Ucicky in 1928. Two years later, she starred in My Wife's Teacher, directed by Robert Florey.

In 2001, she published her autobiography, "Malena Clara", written by playwright Pedro Víllora

== Death ==
In January 2003, she suffered an angina attack and was admitted to the University Hospital of Malaga. She died in Benalmádena in the Province of Málaga (her mother was born and raised in the same province) in August 2003, aged 97. She had two children. Her son, Florián Antonio Martínez Nile, by her marriage to Florián Rey, predeceased her, having committed suicide at age 24 in 1959. Her younger child was her daughter, Alejandra Goyanes Nile, by another marriage. She was married twice. As a divorcee, she could not, in Francoist Spain, legally marry Joaquín Goyanes, the father of her daughter.

== Award ==
She was awarded the honorary Goya at the 3rd Goya Awards.

== Selected filmography ==
- Sister San Sulpicio (1927)
- Restless Hearts (1928)
- Los claveles de la virgen (1929)
- El amor solfeando (1930)
- Lo mejor es reír (1931)
- Cinópolis (1931)
- Su noche de bodas (1931)
- La casa es seria (1932)
- When Do You Commit Suicide? (1932)
- Suburban Melody (1933)
- El novio de mamá (1934)
- Sister San Sulpicio (1934)
- Nobleza baturra (1935)
- Morena Clara (1936)
- Carmen (la de Triana) (1938)
- Nights in Andalusia (1938)
- The Song of Aixa (1939)
- The Story of Tosca (1941)
- Goyescas (1942)
- Bambú (1945)
- The Songstress (1946)
- Song of Dolores (1947)
- La cigarra (1948)
- With the East Wind (1966)
- Andalucía, un siglo de fascinación (1997, TV miniseries)
