= Pedro Nava (writer) =

Brazilian writer and physician

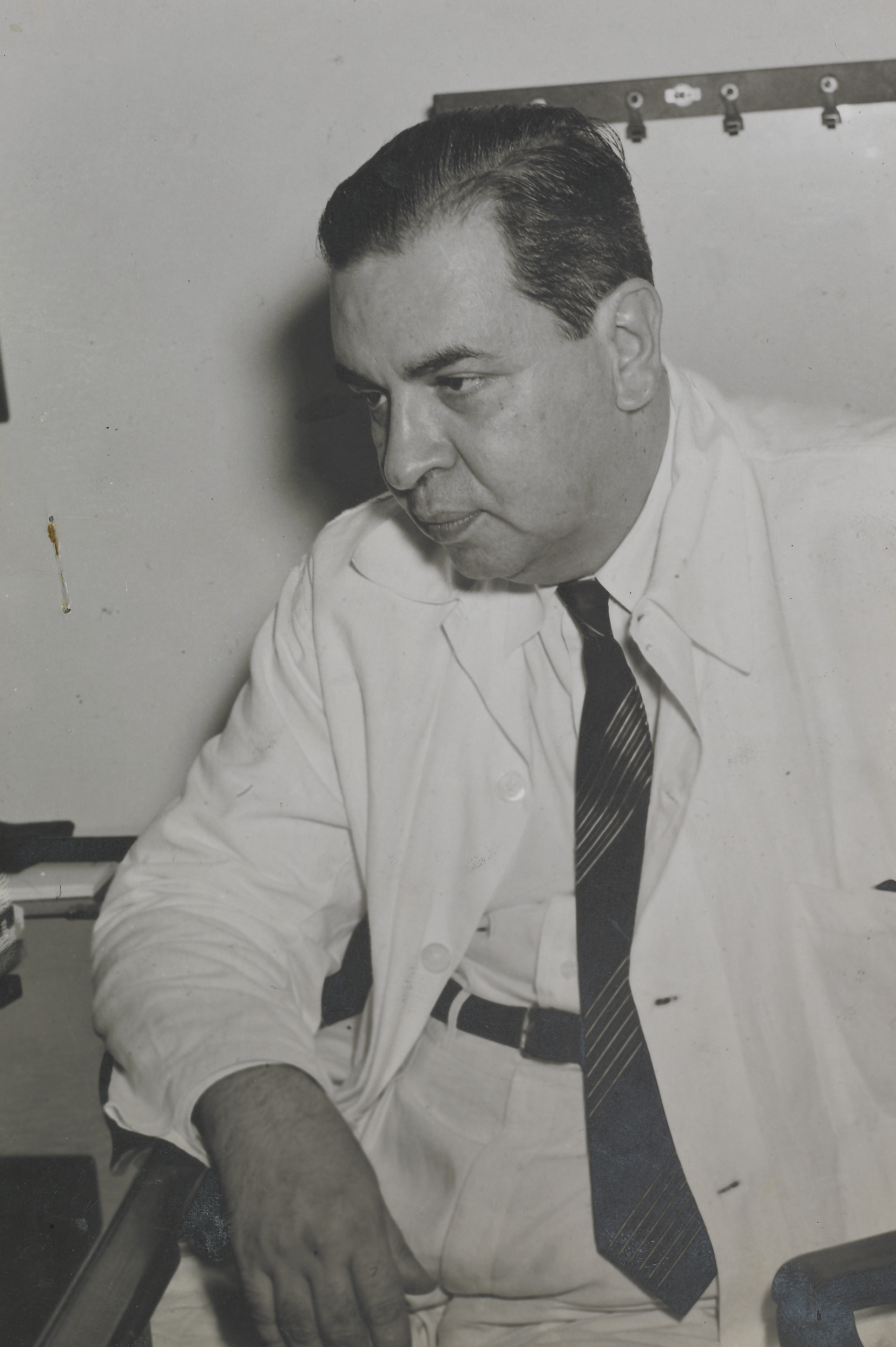
- Born: Pedro da Silva Nava; June 5, 1903
- Died: May 13, 1984 (aged 80)

Pedro da Silva Nava (June 5, 1903 – May 13, 1984) was a Brazilian poet, medical doctor, and professor. He is widely regarded as one of the greatest memoirists of Brazilian literature.

== Works ==
- Baú de Ossos
- Balão Cativo
- Chão-de-Ferro
- Beira-Mar
- Galo-das-Trevas
- O Círio Perfeito
