= The Cursed Village (1930 film) =

1930 film

- Directed by: Florián Rey
- Written by: Florián Rey
- Produced by: Pedro Larrañaga; Florián Rey
- Starring: Carmen Viance; Pedro Larrañaga; Amelia Muñoz
- Cinematography: Alberto Arroyo
- Production company: Florián Rey-Pedro Larrañaga
- Distributed by: Selecciones Núñez
- Release date: 8 December 1930
- Running time: 57 minutes
- Country: Spain
- Languages: Silent; Spanish intertitles

The Cursed Village (Spanish: La aldea maldita) is a 1930 Spanish silent drama film directed by Florián Rey and starring Carmen Viance, Pedro Larrañaga and Amelia Muñoz. Rey remade the film in 1942.

== Cast ==
- Carmen Viance as Acacia
- Pedro Larrañaga as Juan de Castilla
- Amelia Muñoz as Magdalena
- Pilar Torres as Fuensantica
- Ramón Meca as Tío Lucas
- Víctor Pastor as El Abuelo
- Antonio Mata as Gañán
- Modesto Rivas as El Administrador
- José Baviera
- Ricardo Núñez

== Bibliography ==
- Bentley, Bernard. A Companion to Spanish Cinema. Boydell & Brewer 2008.
