= Malvaloca (play) =

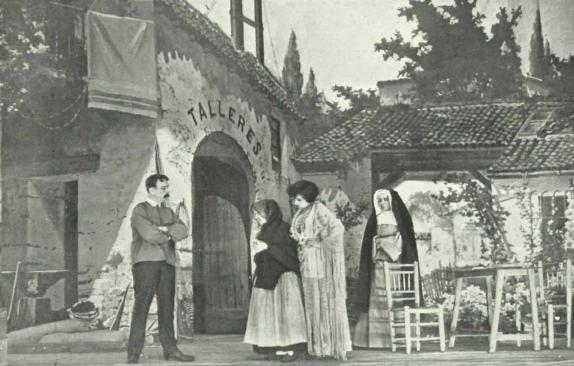
A performance of the play in 1912.

Malvaloca is a 1912 play written by the Spanish brothers Joaquín Álvarez Quintero and Serafín Álvarez Quintero. It has been adapted into films three times. A fallen woman from Málaga is eventually redeemed. The title refers to the name of the leading character.

== Bibliography ==
- Peiró, Eva Woods. White Gypsies: Race and Stardom in Spanish Musical Films. University of Minnesota Press, 2012.
