= Angelillo =

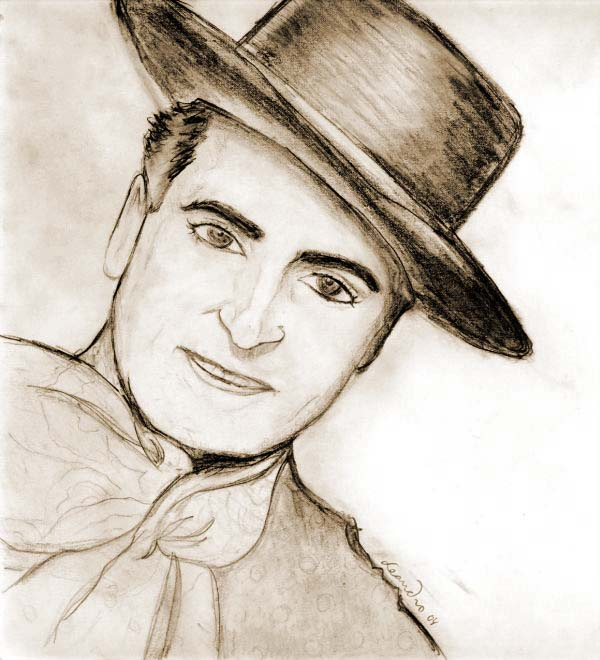
- Artist's depiction of Angelillo

Background information
- Born: Ángel Sampedro Montero; January 12, 1908; Vallecas, Madrid, Spain
- Died: November 24, 1973 Buenos Aires, Argentina
- Genres: Flamenco, Copla, Spanish folk music
- Occupations: Singer, actor
- Years active: 1920s–1970s
- Label: Various

Ángel Sampedro Montero (12 January 1908 in Vallecas, Madrid- 24 November 1973 in Buenos Aires, Argentina), better known as Angelillo, was a Spanish singer of popular songs in his time. He has been described as a "popular idol of the flamenco copla", a very particular style of flamenco, along with fandangos, soleares, saetas, caracoles and tarantas etc. He was also one of the earliest singers to sing in a forced falsetto in flamenco. He was also an actor in musical films of Andalusian folklore: He appeared in films such as La hija de Juan Simón (1935) and Suspiros de Triana (1955), becoming a film star for Filmófono and working with esteemed directors such as Luis Buñuel, which led to him being nicknamed “the nightingale of Andalusia”.

Angelillo was one of the most outspoken advocates of the Republic, with communist ideologies. He fled to Oran and from there, accompanied by Sabicas, to Argentina, where he quickly gained immense popularity. He returned to Spain in the 1950s.
