= Pilar Muñoz =

Spanish actress

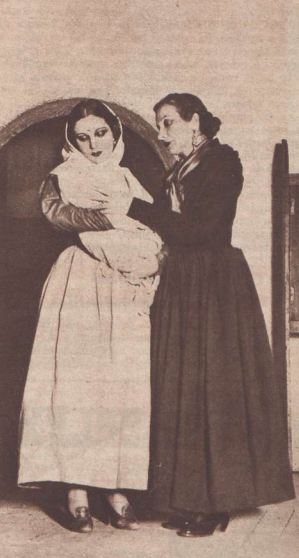
- Muñoz (right) with Margarita Xirgu in Yerma (1934)
- Born: Pilar Muñoz Ruiz; March 18, 1911; Madrid, Spain
- Died: October 1, 1980 (aged 69); Madrid, Spain

Pilar Muñoz Ruiz (March 18, 1911 - October 1, 1980) was a Spanish stage and film actress.

Daughter of actor Alfonso Muñoz and sister of actress Mimí Muñoz, she began acting with Margarita Xirgu in 1925. In 1927 she appeared in La princesa Bebé and 1931 in Vidas cruzadas, both with Jacinto Benavente and next to Xirgú and her father. Three years later came one of their biggest hits, Ni al amor ni al mar, del mismo autor, in 1934 at the Festival de Mérida with Medea and Electra. Premiering soon after was Yerma (1934) - in which she played María.

During the Spanish Civil War, Xirgú accompanied her on a tour of the Americas, premiering in Buenos Aires with La casa de Bernarda Alba. She did not return to Spain until 1947. In 1950 she starred in En la ardiente oscuridad, alongside José María Rodero and Adolfo Marsillach, under director Luis Escobar. She also appeared in José Martín Recuerda's plays Cena de Navidad (1951) La otra orilla (1954), and El teatrito de don Ramón (1959). In 1969 she starred in Seán O'Casey's play Red Roses for Me, and Ricardo López Aranda's play Isabelita the Miracielos in 1978.

== Filmography ==
- 1979 Los bingueros
- 1978 Soldados
- 1978 Nunca en horas de clase
- 1978 Cabo de vara
- 1977 El puente
- 1977 Climax
- 1976 Emilia... parada y fonda
- 1976 Manuela
- 1976 La espuela
- 1975 Jo, papá
- 1974 El amor del capitán Brando
- 1969 Juicio de faldas
- 1964 El señor de La Salle
- 1963 Benigno, hermano mío
- 1960 Maribel y la extraña familia
- Back to the Door (1959)
- 1954 Malvaloca
- Malibran's Song (1951)
- 1950 Sangre en Castilla
- Agustina of Aragon (1950)
- 1950 La honradez de la cerradura
- 1950 Gente sin importancia
- 1950 Crimen en el entreacto
- 1945 Villa rica del Espíritu Santo
- 1937 Gli ultimi giorni di Pompeo
- 1936 El cura de aldea
- Juan Simón's Daughter (1935)
- 1935 Nobleza baturra
