= Sister San Sulpicio (1934 film) =

- Directed by: Florián Rey
- Written by: Armando Palacio Valdés (novel); Florián Rey
- Starring: Imperio Argentina; Miguel Ligero; Salvador Soler Marí
- Cinematography: Heinrich Gartner; Carlos Pahissa
- Music by: Joaquín Turina
- Production company: CIFESA
- Distributed by: CIFESA
- Release date: 18 October 1934
- Running time: 90 minutes
- Country: Spain
- Language: Spanish

Sister San Sulpicio (Spanish:La hermana San Sulpicio) is a 1934 Spanish comedy film directed by Florián Rey and starring Imperio Argentina, Miguel Ligero and Salvador Soler Marí. It is a remake of Rey's 1927 silent film Sister San Sulpicio which had been based on Armando Palacio Valdés's novel of the same title.

It was made by CIFESA, Spain's largest studio of the era.

== Cast ==
- Imperio Argentina as Gloria / Hermana San Sulpicio
- Miguel Ligero as Daniel Suárez
- Salvador Soler Marí as Ceferino Sanjurjo
- Rosita Lacasa as Isabel
- Ana Adamuz as Paca
- Luis Martínez Tovar as Don Óscar
- Mari Paz Molinero
- Emilio Portes
- María Anaya as Madre Florentina
- Enrique Vico
- Juan Calvo as Hombre que pide otra copla
- Cándida Folgado
- Nicolás D. Perchicot as Señor Paco
- Olga Romero

== Bibliography ==
- Goble, Alan. The Complete Index to Literary Sources in Film. Walter de Gruyter, 1 Jan 1999.
