= Florián Rey =

Spanish film director

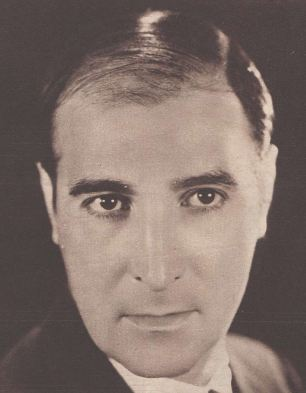
- Born: Antonio Martínez del Castillo; 25 January 1894; La Almunia de Doña Godina (Zaragoza), Spain
- Died: 11 April 1962 (aged 68); Benidorm (Alicante), Spain
- Occupations: Film director, producer, screenwriter
- Years active: 1924–1956
- Spouse: Imperio Argentina (1934–1939)

Antonio Martínez del Castillo known professionally as Florián Rey was a Spanish director, actor, and screenwriter. He directed The Cursed Village, widely recognized as a seminal work in silent Spanish cinema, and helped launch the career of famed Argentinian–Spanish actress Imperio Argentina.

== Early career ==
While in his teens, Rey began work as a journalist for multiple newspapers in his home province of Zaragoza and nearby Madrid. It was during this time that he assumed the name Florián Rey. He took work as an actor, first in the theater in Madrid and then film. His first film role was in La inaccessible in 1920.

Rey's directorial debut was with the film The Troublemaker in 1924. As with many of his early films, The Troublemaker was an adaptation of a zarzuela, a Spanish musical theater that was highly popular with the middle and lower classes of the late nineteenth century.

In 1926, Rey, with Spanish director Juan de Orduña, created the production company Goya Films. Rey continued directing zarzuela adaptations and other forms of melodramas through the 1920s for Goya Films as well as other production companies.

In 1927, Rey cast Argentinian–Spanish actress Imperio Argentina in Sister San Sulpicio. This marked her debut as an actress in Spain. The two would later collaborate on other films and eventually marry.

== La aldea maldita ==
Rey directed The Cursed Village in 1929. This would be his most successful film and is regarded by many critics as a masterpiece of silent Spanish cinema. Rey intended for La aldea maldita to be a silent film, but, after completing production, decided to include sound. This necessitated additional shooting and synchronization in Paris. The decision to move sound production to France stemmed from Rey's dissatisfaction with the quality of the sound in his first talkie, Football, Love, and Bullfighting, in 1929. No copy of the sound version of La aldea maldita exists today.

Many film historians claim Rey was inspired by Russian Expressionist films during the making of La aldea maldita, particularly The Village of Sin by Olga Prebajenskaia, although the influence of this specific film on Rey is not universally agreed. Rey incorporated such aspects of Russian Expressionism into his film as attention to shadow, camera "walk-throughs" (actors walk towards a camera followed by a shot of them moving away, as if they moved through it), and closeups on peasant faces.

== Later work ==
After the success of La aldea maldita, Rey was retained as a director for CIFESA, though he traveled and filmed in other countries during the 1930s. While touring Mexico to promote and show Morena Clara, Rey and his wife Imperio Argentina were courted by German officials intending to hire him to direct movies for Hispano-Film Produktion. Upon their visit to Germany, Rey and Argentina were met by both Adolf Hitler and Joseph Goebbels to discuss film projects. Goebbels requested that Rey remake one of his earlier films based on a rewritten script that would be provided to him. Instead, Rey decided on an adaptation of Carmen. The resulting film, Carmen la de Triana, starred Argentina as the titular Carmen.

Rey remained in Germany and made additional films for Hispano-Film Produktion. His last film with Argentina was La cancion de Aixa (Aixa's Song) in 1939. Amidst rumors that Argentina had an affair with Hitler, the couple divorced and Rey returned to Spain. Rey and Argentina's relationship in Germany was the inspiration for the film The Girl of Your Dreams, directed by Fernando Trueba in 1998.

Upon his return to Spain, Rey continued working for CIFESA studios. He received success with several films, including a remake of La aldea maldita, but was never able to match the success of his films with Argentina.

== Filmography ==
Year	Spanish Title	English Title	Notes
1921	La verbena de la paloma	The Fair of the Dove	Actor
1924	The Troublemaker		
1925	La chavala		
1925	Los chicos de la escuela		
1925	Carnival Figures		
1925	El Lazarillo de Tormes		
1926	El cura de aldea		
1926	El pilluelo de Madrid		
1927	The Mysteries of Tangier		
1927	Sister San Sulpicio		The debut of Imperio Argentina
1928	Agustina of Aragon		
1928	Los claveles de la virgen		
1929	Fútbol, amor y toros	Soccer, Love, and Bullfighting	Rey's first talkie
1929	La aldea maldita	The Cursed Village	Originally released in sound, but sound version presumed lost. Silent version survived.
1931	Los buenos dias		
1932	El cliente seductor		
1933	Esperame		
1933	Melodia de arrabal	Song of the Shantytown	
1934	Sister San Sulpicio		Remake in sound of an earlier Rey film
1934	El novio de mamá	Mama's Suitor	
1934	Romanza rusa		
1934	Sierra de Ronda		
1934	Soy un senorito		
1935	Nobleza baturra	Aragonese Virtue or Rustic Chivalry	
1936	Morena Clara	Clara, the Brunette or Dark and Bright	
1938	Carmen, la de Triana		
1939	The Song of Aixa		Rey's last film with Argentina
1940	La Dolores		
1941	Polizón a bordo	Stowaway on Board	
1942	La aldea maldita	The Cursed Village	Remake of an earlier Rey film
1942	Eramos siete a la mesa		
1943	Ana Maria		
1943	Idolas		
1943	Orosia		
1945	La luna vale un millon		
1946	Audiencia publica		
1947	La nao capitana		
1948	Brindis a Manolete		
1948	La cigarra		
1950	Cuentos de La Alhambra		
1953	La moza de cántaro		
1954	La cruz de mayo		
1954	La danza de los deseos		
1954	Maleficio/Tres citas con el destino	Witchcraft/Three Dates with Destiny	
1956	Polvorilla		

== Notes ==
=== References ===
- D'Lugo, Marvin (1997). Guide to the Cinema of Spain. Westport, CT: Greenwood Press. ISBN 0313294747.
- Faulkner, Sally (2013). A History of Spanish Film, Cinema and Society 1910–2010. New York: Bloomsbury Academic. ISBN 978-0826416674.
- Goble, Alan (1991). Directors' Filmography and Indexes. The International Film Index, 1895–1990. Vol. 2. London: Bowker-Saur. ISBN 0862916232.
- Kinder, Marsha (1993). Blood Cinema: The Reconstruction of National Identity in Spain. Berkeley, CA: University of California Press. ISBN 0520081579.
- Mira Nouselles, Alberto (2010). Historical Dictionary of Spanish Cinema. Plymouth, UK: Rowman & Littlefield. ISBN 978-0810859579.
- Pavlovic, Tatjana; Alvarez, Inmaculada; Blanco-Cano, Rosana; Grisales, Anitra; Osorio, Alejandra; Sanchez, Alejandra (2009). 100 Years of Spanish Cinema. West Sussex, UK: Wiley-Blackwell. ISBN 978-1405184199.
- Stone, Rob (2002). Spanish Cinema. Essex, UK: Pearson Education Limited. ISBN 0582437156.
- Triana-Toribio, Núria (2003). Spanish National Cinema. London: Routledge. ISBN 0415220602.

== Bibliography ==
- Sánchez Vidal, Agustín. El cine de Florián Rey, Zaragoza, Caja de Ahorros de la Inmaculada de Aragón, 1991; ISBN 84-606-0526-4
