= List of films dealing with anarchism =

Films, fictional and non-fictional, which focus on anarchism, anarchist movements, and/or anarchist characters as a theme, include:

== Films with actors and fictional films ==
Year	Title	Director	Genre	Themes
1912	Bandits en automobile	Victorin-Hippolyte Jasset	Thriller	Bonnot Gang, Illegalism
1913	Germinal	Albert Capellani	Drama	Strike action
1914	La Commune	Armand Guerra	Drama	Paris Commune
1914	Martin Eden	Hobart Bosworth	Drama	Individualism
1915	Gus and the Anarchists	John A. Murphy	Comedy	
1917	In Again, Out Again	John Emerson	Comedy	Anarcho-pacifism
1919	The New Moon	Chester Withey	Adventure Drama	Russian Revolution
1921	The Earth	André Antoine	Drama	Property
1922	Cops	Edward F. Cline and Buster Keaton	Comedy	Anti-police sentiment
1922	The Strangers' Banquet	Marshall Neilan	Drama	Anarcho-syndicalism, Strike action
1923	Legally Dead	William Parke	Drama	Prison, Capital punishment
1929	The New Babylon	Grigori Kozintsev and Leonid Trauberg	Historical drama	Paris Commune
1930	All Quiet on the Western Front	Lewis Milestone	War Epic	Anti-war, PTSD, World War I
1930	L'Age d'Or	Luis Buñuel	Surrealism	Modernity, Bourgeois Mores, Catholic Value system
1931	The Front Page	Lewis Milestone	Comedy	Capital Punishment, Yellow Journalism
1932	¡Que viva Mexico!	Sergei Eisenstein	Historical	History of Mexico (Mexican Revolution)
1933	Hallelujah, I'm a Bum	Lewis Milestone	Musical	Hobo lifestyle
1933	Prisoner 13	Fernando de Fuentes	War Drama	Mexican Revolution
1933	Godfather Mendoza	Fernando de Fuentes	War Drama	Mexican Revolution, Zapatistas
1933	Zero for Conduct	Jean Vigo	Comedy drama	Anarchism and education
1934	L'Atalante	Jean Vigo	Romantic Comedy drama	Marriage, Jealousy
1935	A Night at the Opera	Sam Wood	Comedy	High society
1935	Toni	Jean Renoir	Drama	Migrant workers
1936	The Crime of Monsieur Lange	Jean Renoir	Satirical Crime drama	Cooperative
1936	Sabotage	Alfred Hitchcock	Thriller	Sabotage, Propaganda of the deed, Espionage
1936	Let's Go with Pancho Villa	Fernando de Fuentes	War Drama	Mexican Revolution, Pancho Villa
1937	Aurora de esperanza	Antonio Sau	Drama	Spanish Revolution of 1936
1937	Barrios bajos	Pedro Puche	Drama	Prostitution, Second Spanish Republic
1938	Nuestro culpable	Fernando Mignoni	Comedy	Expropriation
1938	No quiero! No quiero!	Francisco Elías Riquelme	Comedy	
1938	Port of Shadows	Marcel Carné	Film noir	Desertion
1938	You Can't Take It with You	Frank Capra	Romantic comedy	Class divide
1940	His Girl Friday	Howard Hawks	Romantic comedy	Feminism, Gender, Love
1940	The Great Dictator	Charlie Chaplin	Political satire	Antisemitism, Fascism
1941	Love on the Dole	John Baxter	Drama	Great Depression, Unemployment benefits
1941	"Pimpernel" Smith	Leslie Howard	Thriller	Anti-Nazism, World War II
1945	Espoir: Sierra de Teruel	André Malraux and Boris Peskine	War	Spanish Civil War (Battle of Teruel)
1948	The Treasure of the Sierra Madre	John Huston	Western Adventure	
1951	Venom and Eternity	Isidore Isou	Experimental drama	Lettrism
1952	The Fighter	Herbert Kline	Film noir	Mexican Revolution
1952	Viva Zapata!	Elia Kazan	Historical drama	Emiliano Zapata, Mexican Revolution
1953	Les Vacances de Monsieur Hulot	Jacques Tati	Comedy	
1954	Animal Farm	John Halas & Joy Batchelor	Drama	Anti-Stalinism, Russian Revolution
1954	Salt of the Earth	Herbert Biberman	Drama	Feminism, Strike action, Syndicalism
1955	Rififi	Jules Dassin	Film noir	Illegalism
1959	The Great War	Mario Monicelli	Comedy drama War film	Italian front (World War I)
1959	The Death Ship	Georg Tressler	Adventure drama	Anti-nationalism, Bureaucracy
1960	Macario	Roberto Gavaldón	Fantasy drama	Day of the Dead, Colonial Mexico
1960	The Siege of Sidney Street	Robert S. Baker & Monty Berman	Historical drama	Tottenham Outrage (Siege of Sidney Street)
1961	Rosa Blanca	Roberto Gavaldón	Thriller	Petroleum politics, Political corruption
1962	A Girl... and a Million	Luciano Salce	Comedy drama	Italian economic miracle, Anti-work
1962	Lonely Are the Brave	David Miller	Contemporary Western	Illegal Immigration, Jailbreak
1962	Warriors Five	Leopoldo Savona	War	Italian resistance movement
1963	Germinal	Yves Allégret	Drama	Strike action
1963	The Organizer	Mario Monicelli	Drama	Industrial unionism
1964	Behold a Pale Horse	Fred Zinnemann	War	Spanish Civil War, Spanish Maquis
1964	Diary of a Chambermaid	Luis Buñuel	Drama	Bourgeoisie, Nationalism
1964	La vita agra	Carlo Lizzani	Comedy	Italian economic miracle, Strike action
1965	Lady L	Peter Ustinov	Comedy	Love
1966	Here Is Your Life	Jan Troell	Coming-of-age Drama	Revolutionary Socialism, World War I
1967	Entranced Earth	Glauber Rocha	Drama	Anti-electoralism, Political corruption
1967	The Elusive Avengers	Edmond Keosayan	Adventure	Russian Civil War, Ukrainian War of Independence
1967	The Wall	Serge Roullet	Drama	Capital punishment, Existentialist anarchism, Spanish Civil War, "The Wall"
1967	Week-end	Jean-Luc Godard	Black comedy	Bourgeoisie, Nihilism
1968	The Bofors Gun	Jack Gold	Drama	Allied-occupied Germany
1968	if....	Lindsay Anderson	Drama	Insurrectionary anarchism, Anti-establishment
1968	Head	Bob Rafelson	Satirical Musical Adventure film	Freedom of Expression
1968	La Bande à Bonnot	Philippe Fourastié	Crime drama	Illegalism, Bonnot Gang
1969	Eros Plus Massacre	Yoshishige Yoshida	Biography	Anarchism, Free love, Ōsugi Sakae
1969	Gaily, Gaily	Norman Jewison	Comedy	Political corruption
1969	Sirokkó	Miklós Jancsó	Drama film	Assassination of Alexander I of Yugoslavia, Propaganda of the deed
1969	The Secret of Santa Vittoria	Stanley Kramer	War Dramedy	Anti-fascism
1969	The Milky Way	Luis Buñuel	Surrealist Comedy drama	Heresy
1970	Charles, Dead or Alive	Alain Tanner	Drama	Protests of 1968
1970	Emiliano Zapata	Felipe Cazals	Historical drama	Emiliano Zapata, Mexican Revolution
1970	Malatesta	Peter Lilienthal	Biographical drama	Errico Malatesta
1970	Metello	Mauro Bolognini	Drama	Class struggle
1970	The Molly Maguires	Martin Ritt	Historical drama	Molly Maguires, Pinkertons, Strike action, Social justice
1970	Wind from the East	Dziga Vertov Group	Drama	Class struggle
1971	A Fistful of Dynamite	Sergio Leone	Epic Western	Mexican Revolution
1971	Joe Hill	Bo Widerberg	Biopic	Joe Hill, Industrial Workers of the World
1971	W.R.: Mysteries of the Organism	Dušan Makavejev	Fantasy Comedy	Communism, Sexuality, Wilhelm Reich
1971	Sacco & Vanzetti	Giuliano Montaldo	Docudrama	Sacco and Vanzetti
1972	Lenin, You Rascal, You	Kirsten Stenbæk	Musical comedy	Vladimir Lenin, Ten Days That Shook the World
1972	Pink Flamingos	John Waters	Exploitation comedy	Sexual revolution
1972	St. Michael Had a Rooster	Paolo and Vittorio Taviani	Drama	Anarchism and Marxism
1972	Tout Va Bien	Jean-Luc Godard and Jean-Pierre Gorin	Political drama	Class struggle, May 68
1973	Can Dialectics Break Bricks?	René Viénet	Comedy	Situationism, Dialectics
1973	El principio	Gonzalo Martínez Ortega	Historical drama	Mexican Revolution
1973	The Iceman Cometh	John Frankenheimer	Drama	Anarcho-syndicalism, Existentialism
1973	Love and Anarchy	Lina Wertmüller	Romantic drama	Anarchism, Anti-fascism, Relationship anarchy
1973	O Lucky Man!	Lindsay Anderson	Fantasy Comedy drama	Capitalism
1973	The Year 01	Jacques Doillon, Alain Resnais, Jean Rouch	Comedy	Anarcho-syndicalism, Labor strike, Social ecology
1974	Allonsanfàn	Paolo and Vittorio Taviani	Drama	Comradeship
1974	Between Wars	Michael Thornhill	War drama	Anti-fascism, Psychiatry
1974	The Front Page	Billy Wilder	Black comedy	Capital Punishment, Yellow journalism
1974	La prima Angélica	Carlos Saura	Drama	Anti-fascism, Spanish Civil War
1974	Nada	Claude Chabrol	Social thriller	Propaganda of the deed
1974	The Phantom of Liberty	Luis Buñuel	Surrealist comedy	Mores
1974	Quebracho	Ricardo Wullicher	Drama	Anarcho-syndicalism
1974	Rebellion in Patagonia	Héctor Olivera	Period drama	Anarcho-syndicalism, Patagonia Rebelde
1974	We All Loved Each Other So Much	Ettore Scola	Comedy drama	Italian resistance movement
1975	Libera, My Love	Mauro Bolognini	Drama	Anarchism in Italy, Italian resistance movement
1975	Monty Python and the Holy Grail	Terry Gilliam & Terry Jones	Comedy	Anarcho-syndicalism, King Arthur, Monarchy
1975	Mother Küsters' Trip to Heaven	Rainer Werner Fassbinder	Drama	Anarchism and Marxism, Weimar Republic
1975	The Travelling Players	Theodoros Angelopoulos	Historical drama	History of Greece (Greek Civil War, Greek Resistance)
1975	Winstanley	Kevin Brownlow	Period drama	Diggers, English Revolution, Gerrard Winstanley, Ranters
1976	Letters from Marusia	Miguel Littín	Historical drama	Marusia massacre, Strike action
1976	Long Vacations of 36	Jaime Camino	Drama	Bourgeoisie, Neutrality, Spanish Civil War
1976	Jonah Who Will Be 25 in the Year 2000	Alain Tanner	Drama	Protests of 1968, Intentional community, Trade unionism
1977	Spoiled Children	Bertrand Tavernier	Drama	Tenants' union
1978	La Barricade du point du jour	René Richon	Historical drama	Paris Commune
1978	Ora sí ¡tenemos que ganar!	Raúl Kamffer	Drama	Magonism, Mexican Revolution
1978	A Man Called Autumn Flower	Pedro Olea	Drama	Gender variance, Queer anarchism, Dictatorship of Primo de Rivera
1979	Heart of the Forest	Manuel Gutiérrez Aragón	Drama	Spanish Maquis
1980	Alexander the Great	Theodoros Angelopoulos	Historical drama	Anarcho-communism, Class conflict, Dilessi murders
1980	The Crime of Cuenca	Pilar Miró	Drama	Crime of Cuenca, Miscarriage of justice
1980	Journeys from Berlin/1971	Yvonne Rainer	Drama	Anarcha-feminism, Psychoanalysis, Red Army Faction, Russian Revolution
1980	La verdad sobre el caso Savolta	Antonio Drove	Drama	Anarcho-syndicalism, Pistolerismo
1980	The Mystery of Oberwald	Michelangelo Antonioni	Drama	Propaganda of the deed, Class conflict
1981	Deprisa, Deprisa	Carlos Saura	Crime drama	Juvenile delinquency
1981	Lenin in Paris	Sergei Yutkevich	Biopic	Vladimir Lenin
1981	L'ombre rouge	Jean-Louis Comolli	Thriller	Spanish Civil War
1981	Ragtime	Miloš Forman	Drama	Racism
1981	Reds	Warren Beatty	Period drama	Emma Goldman, John Reed, Russian Revolution
1982	Britannia Hospital	Lindsay Anderson	Black comedy	National Health Service
1982	Une chambre en ville	Jacques Demy	Musical drama	Strike action
1983	And the Ship Sails On	Federico Fellini	Historical drama	High society, Refugees, World War I
1983	Born in Flames	Lizzie Borden	Science fiction	Classism, Feminism, Heterosexism, Racism
1983	Sweet Bunch	Nikos Nikolaidis	Experimental Crime drama	Anti-statism, Surveillance
1983	Vive la sociale!	Gérard Mordillat	Comedy	Anarcho-communism
1984	Bicycles Are for the Summer	Jaime Chávarri	Drama	Spanish Civil War
1984	Nineteen Eighty-Four	Michael Radford	Dystopian Sci-fi	Anti-authoritarianism, Mass surveillance, Totalitarianism
1984	Suburbia	Penelope Spheeris	Drama/Thriller	Punk subculture, Squatting
1985	Bairoletto, la aventura de un rebelde	Atilio Polverini and Sebastián Larreta	Historical drama	Juan Bautista Bairoletto
1985	Die Küken kommen	Eckhart Schmidt	Comedy	
1985	Mambru Went to War	Fernando Fernán-Gómez	Drama	Death of Francisco Franco
1986	Shadows in Paradise	Aki Kaurismäki	Comedy drama	Proletariat
1986	Year of Enlightment	Fernando Trueba	Coming-of-age	Francoist Spain, Love
1987	Dedé Mamata	Rodolfo Brandão	Drama	Military dictatorship in Brazil
1987	Matewan	John Sayles	Drama	Battle of Matewan, Strike action
1988	Ariel	Aki Kaurismäki	Drama	Proletariat
1988	They Live	John Carpenter	Sci-fi Action-thriller	Commercialization, Subliminal messaging
1989	My 20th Century	Ildikó Enyedi	Comedy drama	Anarcha-feminism
1990	¡Ay Carmela!	Carlos Saura	Comedy drama	Spanish Civil War
1990	The Match Factory Girl	Aki Kaurismäki	Comedy drama	Proletariat
1990	Slacker	Richard Linklater	Comedy drama	Social class, Unemployment
1991	Manuel, le fils emprunté	François Labonté		Refugees, Spanish Civil War
1991	Sandino	Miguel Littín	Biographical	Augusto César Sandino, United States occupation of Nicaragua
1993	Germinal	Claude Berri	Epic	Strike action
1993	The Strategy of the Snail	Sergio Cabrera	Comedy	Right to housing, Squatting
1994	La Vie sexuelle des Belges 1950–1978	Jan Bucquoy	Biographical Comedy	Jan Bucquoy
1995	Land and Freedom	Ken Loach	War	Barcelona May Days, POUM, Spanish Civil War
1995	Empoli 1921: film in rosso e in nero	Ennio Marzocchini	Drama	Biennio Rosso, Anti-fascism
1995	Long Live the Hobos!	Ana Poliak	Biography	Hobos, Immigration
1996	La Belle Verte	Coline Serreau	Sci-fi Comedy	Utopia
1996	Libertarias	Vicente Aranda	War	Anarcha-feminism, Mujeres Libres, Spanish Civil War
1997	The Son of Bakunin	Gianfranco Cabiddu	Drama	Anarchism in Italy
1997	Men with Guns	John Sayles	Drama	
1998	Le Poulpe	Guillaume Nicloux	Crime comedy	Political corruption
1998	The Girl of Your Dreams	Fernando Trueba	Drama	Anti-fascism, Spanish Civil War
1998	The Story of PuPu	Kensaku Watanabe	Comedy	
1999	Butterfly's Tongue	José Luis Cuerda	Drama	Education, Spanish Civil War
1999	Le Petit Voleur	Erick Zonka	Crime drama	Expropriation
1999	Human Resources	Laurent Cantet	Comedy drama	Employment, Social class
1999	Outlaw	Enzo Monteleone	Crime Comedy drama	Horst Fantazzini, Illegalism
2000	Anarchists	Yoo Young-sik	Action	Insurrectionary anarchism, Japanese occupation of Korea, Propaganda of the deed
2000	La Commune (Paris, 1871)	Peter Watkins	Historical drama	Paris Commune
2000	Murderous Maids	Jean-Pierre Denis	Biographical Crime drama	Christine and Léa Papin, Class conflict
2000	Together	Lukas Moodysson	Comedy drama	
2001	South West 9	Richard Parry	Drama	Brixton Rave scene
2001	What to Do in Case of Fire?	Gregor Schnitzler	Action Comedy drama	Gentrification, Squatting
2002	The Anarchist Cookbook	Jordan Susman	Romantic comedy	Nihilism, The Anarchist Cookbook
2003	Acerchiata	Flavio Sciolè	art	Antifilm, Anarchist
2004	The Edukators	Hans Weingartner	Crime drama	Anti-capitalism
2004	Working Slowly (Radio Alice)	Guido Chiesa	Crime drama	Autonomism, Radio Alice, Pirate radio
2005	I Saw Ben Barka Get Killed	Serge Le Péron and Saïd Smihi	Drama	Mehdi Ben Barka
2005	This Revolution	Stephen Marshall	Thriller	2003 invasion of Iraq, Black Bloc, Media bias
2006	Les Brigades du Tigre	Jérôme Cornuau	Crime drama	Bonnot Gang, Illegalism
2006	Salvador (Puig Antich)	Manuel Huerga	Biography	Capital punishment, Iberian Liberation Movement, Salvador Puig Antich
2006	V for Vendetta	James McTeigue	Political thriller	Anti-fascism, Propaganda of the deed
2007	Battle in Seattle	Stuart Townsend	Action-thriller	1999 Seattle WTO protests, Economic inequality
2007	Homotopia	Eric Stanley & Chris Vargas	Drama	Cultural assimilation, Gay Shame, Queer anarchism
2008	The Anarchist's Wife	Maria Noelle and Peter Sehr	Period drama	Anti-fascism
2008	The Wave	Dennis Gansel	Thriller	Anti-fascism, The Third Wave (experiment)
2012	No God, No Master	Terry Green	Crime thriller	1919 United States anarchist bombings, Ludlow Massacre, Sacco and Vanzetti
2013	The East	Zal Batmanglij	Thriller	Eco-terrorism, Green anarchism
2013	Night Moves	Kelly Reichardt	Thriller	Eco-terrorism
2016	Free State of Jones	Gary Ross	Period drama	Abolitionism, Civil rights, Free State of Jones
2016	Captain Fantastic	Matt Ross	Comedy-drama	Intentional community, Self-reliance, Anarcho-primitivism
2017	Anarchist from Colony	Lee Joon-ik	Biographical period drama	Fumiko Kaneko, Japanese dissidence during the early Shōwa period, Pak Yol
2017	Okja	Bong Joon-ho	Action-adventure	Animal Liberation Front, animal rights, veganarchism
2018	Gun City			
2020	The Trial of the Chicago 7	Aaron Sorkin	Historical legal drama	Chicago Seven, 1968 Democratic National Convention protest activity, Black Panther Party, National Mobilization Committee to End the War in Vietnam, Students for a Democratic Society, Youth International Party
2022	How to Blow Up a Pipeline	Daniel Goldhaber	Action-Thriller	Eco-terrorism, Social justice, Property destruction, Environmental justice
2022	A Man of Action	Javier Ruiz Caldera	Crime Drama	Lucio Urtubia, bank robbery, illegalism

== Documentaries ==
Year	Title	Director	Themes
1901	Execution of Czolgosz with Panorama of Auburn Prison	Edwin S. Porter	Assassination of William McKinley, Leon Czolgosz
1930	À propos de Nice	Jean Vigo	Social inequality
1963	To Die in Madrid	Frédéric Rossif	Spanish Civil War
1969	My Girlfriend's Wedding	Jim McBride	Free love, Marriage of convenience
1971	Mexico, The Frozen Revolution	Raymundo Gleyzer	Mexican Revolution
1973	The Society of the Spectacle	Guy Debord	Situationism, The Spectacle, Mass marketing, Social alienation
1974	El Sopar	Pere Portabella	Prison, Salvador Puig Antich
1976	Deus, Pátria, Autoridade	Rui Simões	History of Portugal (5 October 1910 revolution, Estado Novo, Carnation Revolution)
1979	The Old Memory	Jaime Camino	Spanish Civil War
1980	The Free Voice of Labor	Steven Fischler and Joel Sucher	Jewish Anarchism
1981	Anarchism in America	Steven Fischler and Joel Sucher	Anarchism in USA
1981	The Decline of Western Civilization	Penelope Spheeris	Anarcho-punk, Punk rock in California
1983	Mientras el cuerpo aguante	Fernando Trueba	Chicho Sánchez Ferlosio, Anti-authoritarianism, Anarchism and Marxism
1983	Nice... À Propos de Jean Vigo	Manoel de Oliveira	Jean Vigo
1983	Signals Through the Flames	Sheldon Rochlin	The Living Theatre
1991	Lifting the Fog: Intrigue in the Middle East	Allan Segal	Middle East, Geopolitics
1992	Manufacturing Consent: Noam Chomsky and the Media	Mark Achbar and Peter Wintonick	Manufacturing Consent, Media bias, Noam Chomsky
1993	The Revenge of the Dead Indians	Henning Lohner	John Cage
1995	Nestor Makhno, Peasant of Ukraine	Hélène Châtelain	Nestor Makhno
1997	Living Utopia	Juan Gamero	Anarcho-syndicalism, Spanish Revolution
1998	A Place Called Chiapas	Nettie Wild	Zapatista Army of National Liberation
1999	Breaking the Spell	CrimethInc.	1999 Seattle WTO protests, Anti-capitalism
2000	Ácratas	Virginia Martínez	Anarchism in Uruguay
2000	Emma Goldman: The Anarchist Guest	Coleman Romalis	Emma Goldman
2001	Los cuentos del timonel	Eduardo Montes-Bradley	Osvaldo Bayer
2001	The Code	Hannu Puttonen	Free Software Movement
2001	Revolution OS	J. T. S. Moore	GNU, Free Software Movement
2002	Power and Terror	John Junkerman	Terrorism
2003	The Corporation	Mark Achbar and Jennifer Abbott	Corporatocracy
2003	Distorted Morality – America's War On Terror?	John Junkerman	War on terror
2003	The Fourth World War	Richard Rowley	Israel-Palestine conflict
2004	The Diary of Sacco and Vanzetti	David Rothauser	Sacco and Vanzetti
2004	The Miami Model	Independent Media Center	Miami model
2004	The Take	Avi Lewis	Horizontalidad, Organizational Self-management
2005	The Oil Factor	Gerard Ungerman	Petroleum politics, war on terror
2006	Lake of Fire	Tony Kaye	Abortion in the United States
2006	Sacco and Vanzetti	Peter Miller	Sacco and Vanzetti
2006	There Is No Authority But Yourself	Alexander Oey	Anarcho-punk, Crass
2007	In Prison My Whole Life	Marc Evans	Commonwealth v. Abu-Jamal
2007	Lucio	José María Goenaga & Aitor Arregi	Lucio Urtubia
2008	I Need That Record!	Brendan Toller	Counterculture, Independent record stores
2010	The Chicago Conspiracy	CrimethInc.	2006 student protests in Chile, Armed resistance in Chile (1973–1990), Mapuche conflict, Military dictatorship of Chile (1973–1990)
2010	El cine libertario: Cuando las películas hacen historia	José María Almela, Verónica Vigil	Anarchist cinema during the Spanish Civil War
2011	pickAxe	CrimethInc.	Ecotage
2011	END:CIV	Franklin López	Anti-civ, Peak Oil
2011	Hombres de ideas avanzadas	Diego Fidalgo	Joaquim Penina
2011	Je lutte donc je suis	Yannis Youlountas	Political struggles in Greece and Spain
2013	Simón, hijo del pueblo	Rolando Goldman & Julián Troksberg	Simón Radowitzky
2016	American Anarchist	Charlie Siskel	Interviews with William Powell, author of The Anarchist Cookbook, published in 1971.
2016	No Gods, No Masters: A History of Anarchism	Tancrède Ramonet	History of Anarchism

== See also ==
- List of films produced in the Spanish Revolution
- Filmography of environmentalism
