= Debtocracy =

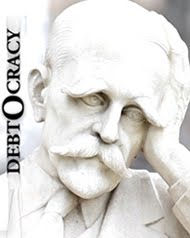
- Directed by: Katerina Kitidi; Aris Chatzistefanou
- Written by: Katerina Kitidi; Aris Chatzistefanou
- Produced by: Kostas Efimeros
- Edited by: Leonidas Vatikiotis
- Music by: Giannis Aggelakas
- Release date: 6 April 2011
- Running time: 74 minutes
- Country: Greece
- Language: Greek

Debtocracy (Greek: Χρεοκρατία Chreokratía) is a 2011 left-wing documentary film by Katerina Kitidi and Aris Chatzistefanou. The documentary examines the causes of the Greek government-debt crisis in 2010 and advocates for the default of "odious debt".

The documentary has been distributed online under a Creative Commons BY-SA 3.0 license since 6 April 2011, and the production said that it has no interest in any kind of commercial exploitation of the project. The documentary is available in Greek and English and is subtitled in French, Spanish, Italian and Portuguese. According to The Nation, half a million people watched the film in the first five days of its release.

The film was followed by a Greek-language book with the same title.

== Name ==
The production team coined the word "debtocracy" (Greek "Χρεοκρατία"), defining it as the condition by which Greece found itself trapped in its debt. The term is derived from the words "χρέος" (debt) and the Greek "κράτος" (power, rule -ocracy). The title implies that the Greek government has been functioning mainly under the interests of the financial debt (at points superseding or even replacing the principles of Democracy and the Constitution of Greece), and therefore the debt has been elevated as a de facto form of government by itself.

== Content summary ==
The PIIGS

The documentary opens with the statements of Greek Prime Ministers, starting with the dictator Georgios Papadopoulos and Dominique Strauss-Kahn, managing director of the International Monetary Fund, and ending with some of the most prominent figures in Greek politics since the metapolitefsi: Andreas Papandreou, Konstantinos Mitsotakis, Kostas Simitis, Kostas Karamanlis and the then Prime Minister George Papandreou. The focus then shifts to the prelude to the 2008 financial crisis and its origins in the 1970s. Interviews with prominent figures of the global philosophical and economic scene argue that the euro is non-viable and contributed to the worsening of the finances of Greece due to a systematic loss of competitiveness in the markets by the PIGS.

The documentary traces the roots of the Greek debt back to the revolution of 1821 and the British loans that were issued. The documentary criticises the notion that the Greek population, since it enjoyed the country's prosperity produced by past loans, is now accountable as a whole for the debts. Debtocracy argues Greek politicians encouraged too much borrowing and corruption. The documentary praises Ecuador's decision to unilaterally default on part of its sovereign debt, on grounds of social justice. The solution suggested for the Greek government-debt crisis is the formation of a committee for the analysis of the debt in a similar way that Ecuador did. If the analysis proves all or part of the debt to be odious the people should not have to pay for it and therefore it should be erased, the film argues.

== Production and participation ==
The production team of Debtocracy have said that the producers are all those individuals that donated money in order to finance the project. Interviewees include:

- David Harvey, geographer and social theorist
- Hugo Arias, president of the debt analysis committee of Ecuador
- Samir Amin, economist
- Eric Toussaint, political scientist and spokesperson of the Committee for the Abolition of Illegitimate Debt
- Gérard Duménil
- Costas Lapavitsas, economist
- Alain Badiou, philosopher
- Manolis Glezos, member of the Greek Resistance and left-wing politician
- Avi Lewis, journalist and film director
- Sahra Wagenknecht

== Critical response ==
The documentary has received mixed reviews, both for its use of economics and its political intention as a film, both by Greek and international media.

The documentary depicted scenes where Argentinian and Ecuadorian politicians had to evacuate the besieged parliaments by means of a helicopter. Iconic images and references to helicopters were adopted by the Aganaktismenoi movement who surrounded the Greek Parliament in 2011.

Critics of the film make four main points:

Accusation of propaganda
The film is suspected to be only a part of a marxist propaganda
False comparison of Greece with Argentina and Ecuador
The film argues that Argentina and Ecuador were right to default but the comparison has been described as incorrect.
Lack of opposing point of views
Only people in favor of a Greek default were questioned
No alternative propositions
Only a cancellation of the Greek debt is invoked. Nothing about the competitiveness of the Greek economy.

Writing for the British newspaper The Guardian, Aditya Chakrabortty said the movie's criticism of the euro was "compelling" and, despite its low budget, called the documentary "the best film of Marxian economic analysis yet produced".

Major Greek newspapers such as To Vima and Kathimerini have criticized the documentary as a work of political propaganda. To Vima argues that Greece's and Ecuador's economies have little in common, as Ecuador is a major oil producer for its size and population, contrary to Greece.

A similar critical review was published by Kathimerini, stating that Debtocracy is aimed at promoting political propaganda rather than objectively presenting a proposed solution to the Greek government-debt crisis. Kathimerini's review also echoed that of To Vima, saying that the examples of both Ecuador and Argentina are unfortunate as they bear no resemblance to Greece and come in full contrast with the documentary's line of argument.

Other Greek media that have criticized the film include Skai TV.

=== In universities ===
Professor of Economics at the University of Athens wrote a letter to the producers of Debtocracy explaining the reasons for which he refused to be included in the documentary production team, and said among other things that he does not believe that Greece and Argentina have anything in common and that a default would not be an easy solution.

Former Aristotle University of Thessaloniki professor Eleftheria Karnavou wrote a letter to the newspaper Agelioforos arguing that being completely against the documentary is unjustified, even though it is politically and scientifically unfounded, as it provides food for thought.

=== Response to criticisms ===
When asked about the one-sidedness of the film by the Greek newspaper Eleftherotypia, the producers replied that they had made it clear from the start who was funding the project, that they used abstracts from documentaries produced by reporters of the BBC, and that those people that speak out against Debtocracy are the same people that find the television news broadcasts to be objective and credible.

== See also ==
- Odious debt
- Economy of Greece
- Propaganda model
