= Je lutte donc je suis =

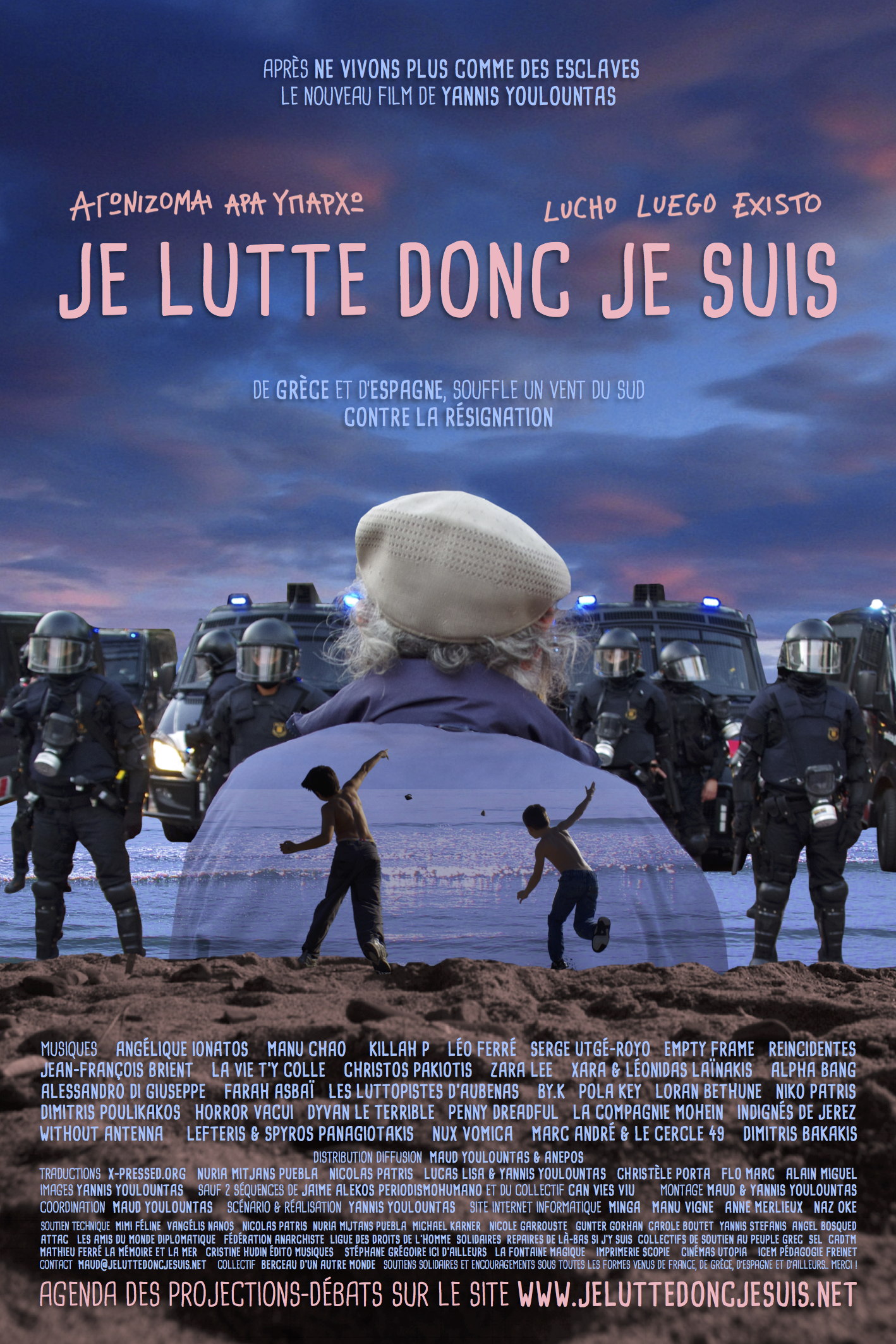
- Poster of the film Je lutte donc je suis
- Directed by: Yannis Youlountas
- Screenplay by: Maude Youlountas; Yannis Youlountas
- Starring: Diego Cañamero, Gabriel Colletis, Juan Manuel Sánchez Gordillo, Angélique Ionatos, Stathis Kouvelakis, Dimitris Papachristos, Dimitris Poulikakos, Éric Toussaint
- Cinematography: Yannis Youlountas
- Edited by: Yannis Youlountas
- Music by: Manu Chao, Angélique Ionatos, Léo Ferré, Serge Utgé-Royo, Killah P (Pávlos Fýssas), Alessandro Di Giuseppe...
- Distributed by: Anepos network
- Release date: August 21, 2015
- Running time: 88 minutes
- Countries: France, Greece, Spain
- Language: French

Je lutte donc je suis (French: I fight therefore I am) is a documentary film about social and political struggles in Greece and Spain, directed by Yannis Youlountas. It was released in September 2015 in France. The title comes from an aphorism of the philosopher René Descartes, Cogito ergo sum (I think therefore I am). Although it was not distributed by any mainstream company, it found success and has been shown to numerous theaters, festivals, in France and in Europe. It received two awards. The film is available under a Creative Commons license.

== Speakers ==
People speaking play their own role.

Extract of Je lutte donc je suis, with Éric Toussaint, a film by Yannis Youlountas

- Diego Cañamero, Andalusian activist and trade-unionist.
- Gabriel Colletis, professor of economy at Toulouse 1 University Capitole.
- Juan Manuel Sánchez Gordillo, Andalusian politician, mayor of Marinaleda, trade-unionist, and professor of history.
- Angélique Ionatos, Greek singer.
- Stathis Kouvelakis, professor of political philosophy at the King's College of London, previously member of SYRIZA central committee.
- Dimitris Papachristos, Greek journalist, member of the November 1973 insurrection against the Colonels dictature.."
- Dimitris Poulikakos, Greek actor and singer, opponent of the Colonels dictature.
- Éric Toussaint, co-founder the international network of the Committee for the Abolition of Illegitimate Debt and coordinator of the Commission for the Truth on Greek debt in 2015.

== Festivals ==
- 12th festival Terres de résistances, Martigues, 3–6 September 2015
- Festival Rencontres AD HOC, Mirabel et Blacons, 9–13 September 2015
- Festival du Livre et du film, Mouans-Sartoux, 2-4 Cctober 2015
- 5th festival du Documentaire Politique et Social, Merlieux, 7–8 November 2015
- 15th festival Cinéma Méditerranéen, Brussels, 4–11 December 2015
- 7th festival of anarchist and activist films, Chambéry, 16–17 January 2016
- 3rd festival Terre et avenir, Salon-de-Provence, 20–27 January 2016
- Festival Mémoires de Résistance, Digne-les-Bains, 27-30 janvier 2016
- Festival 1,2,3 Soleil, Châteaubriant, 28 February-7 March 2016
- Festival Diversité, Bourgogne-Franche-Comté, 23 March-8 April 2016
- 8th festival de Saint-Martin, St-Martin-de-Valamas, 25 March-5 April 2016
- 10th festival ciné d'ATTAC, Mont-de-Marsan, 29 March-2 April 2016
- 10th festival du film antifasciste, Reims et Épernay, 3–18 May 2016
- Festival Origines, Vernoux-en-Vivarais et Valence, 3 June-3 July 2016
- 20th festival of Resistances films, Foix, 8–16 July 2016
- 7th international festival for direct democracy, Thessalonique, 7–9 September 2016

== Popular success ==
On 21 August 2015, the film was shown to the public for the first time for the 600 members of the 52nd congress of the Freinet Pédagogie in Aix-en-Provence, in the south of France. It received a warm welcome.

On 2 April 2016, the film received the award Ciné d'ATTAC 2016 (Grain de sable d'or) à Mont-de-Marsan.

On 19 April 2016, the film was shown during the Nuit debout movement in Nîmes.

On 4 October 2016, the film received the award "Solidarity film" from the Human Rights Ligue in Orly.

== Gallery ==
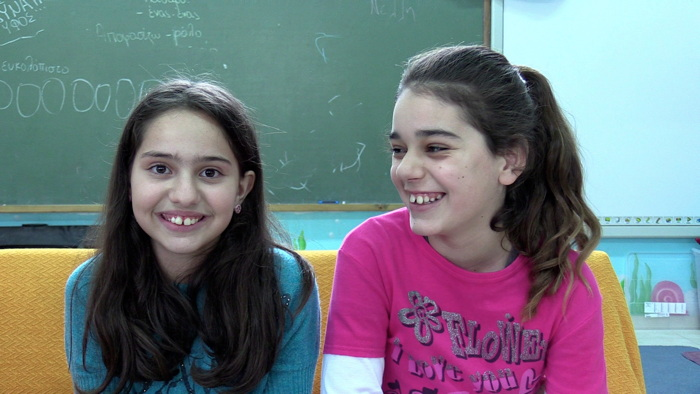
Constantine and Amour, two young girls from the film, at Fourfouras (Crete)

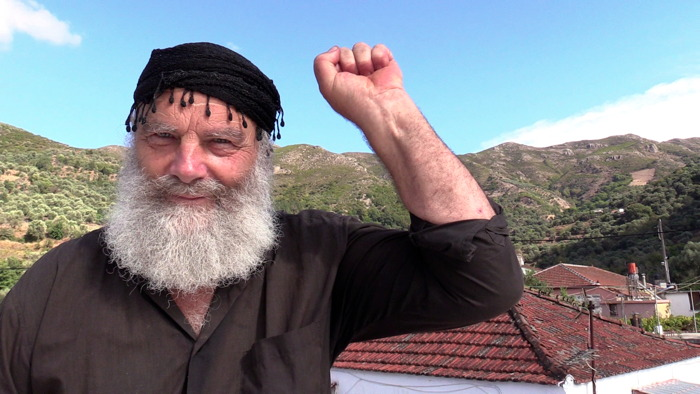
Fragkos, a personage from the film, at Paleia Roumata (Crete)

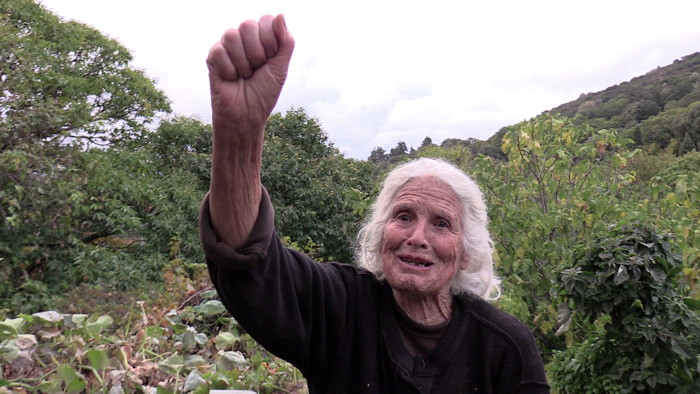
Kriti, a personage from the film, at Paleia Roumata (Crete).

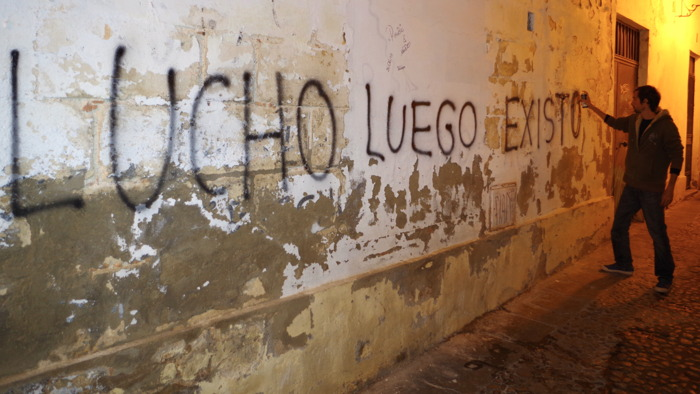
Tag Lucho luego existo (Spanish), at Jerez de la Frontera (Andalusia)

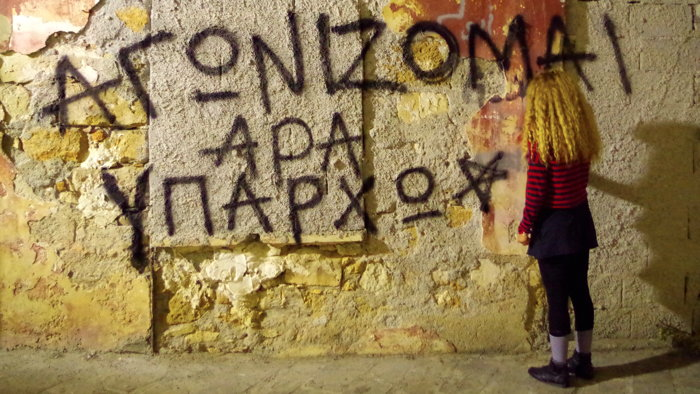
Tag in Greek, at Chania (Crete).
