= List of films produced in the Spanish Revolution =

This is a list of films produced in the Spanish Revolution. In the Spanish Revolution, the film industry was collectivized by the CNT and FAI. Between July 1936 and June 1937, 84 films were produced by SIE Films, FRIEP and Spartacus Films. Only about 40 films have been preserved and not all them are complete.

== Feature films ==
Title	Duration	Year	Director	Producer	Summary
Aurora de esperanza	60'	1937	Antonio Sau	SIE Films	Drama about the economic situation of the working-class and the start of the social revolution.
Barrios bajos	94'	1937	Pedro Puche	SIE Films	Drama regarding prostitution of low class women.
Liberación	?	1937	Joseph Amich i Bert	SIE Films	Lost film.
¡No quiero... no quiero!	110'	1938	Francisco Elías	SIE Films	Lost film.
Nuestro culpable	84'	1938	Fernando Mignoni	Centro Films/FRIEP	Musical comedy about a thief which is arrested for a theft he didn't commit.

== Short films ==
Title	Duration	Year	Director	Producer	Summary
Como fieras		1937			Lost film.
Francisca, mujer fatal		1936	Valentín R. González	SIE Films	Lost film.
La última	15'	1936	Pedro Puche	SIE Films	About the issues related to alcoholism.
Nosotros somos así	31'	1936	Valentín R. González	SIE Films	Musical where some poor children help to save the life of a rich boy's father.
Paquete, el fotógrafo público número uno	35'	1937	Ignacio Ferrés Iquino	SIE Films	Only one minute is preserved.
Prostitución		1936	Feliciano Catalán	SIE Films	Lost film.

== Documentaries ==
Title	Duration	Date	Producer	Summary
Aguiluchos de la FAI por tierras de Aragón (I)	20'	1936	SUEP	First documentary on the Durruti column in the Aragon front during July–August 1936. (Available in Spanish Film Archive)
Aguiluchos de la FAI por tierras de Aragón (II)	7'	1936	SUEP	Second documentary of the series.
Aguiluchos de la FAI por tierras de Aragón (III)	25'	1936	SUEP	Third documentary of the series.
Alas negras	12'	1937	SIE Films	Bombing of Lérida by the fascists.
Amanecer sobre España	44'	1938	SIA	
Ayuda a Madrid	7'	1936	SIE Films	
Bajo el signo libertario	15'	1936	SUEP	
Barcelona trabaja para el frente	23'	1936	Comité Central de Abastos de Barcelona	
La Batalla de Farlete (IV)	16'	1936	SUEP	
El cerco de Huesca	10'	1937	SIE Films	
La Columna de Hierro (Hacia Teruel)	18'	1937	SIE Films	
La conquista de Carrascal de Chimillas (Frente de Huesca)	13'	1936	Carlos Martínez Baena y Ramón Oliveras	
División Heroica (En el Frente de Huesca)	18'	1937	SIE Films	
El Ejército de la Victoria. Un episodio: Casa Ambrosio	10'	1937	SIE Films	
En la brecha	17'	1937	SIE Films	
El entierro de Durruti	10'	1936	SUEP	
El frente y la retaguardia	22'	1937	SIE Films	
Fury over Spain	52'	1937	SIE Films	
El General Pozas visita el Frente de Aragón	4'	1937	SIE Films	
Madrid tumba del fascio (V)	4'	1936	SIE Films	
Madrid tumba del fascio (VIII)	9'	1937	SIE Films	
Madrid tumba del fascio (IX)	10'	1937	SIE Films	
Reportaje del movimiento revolucionario en Barcelona	22'	1936	Oficina de Información y Propaganda de la CNT-FAI	
La silla vacía	17'	1937	SIE Films	
Solidaridad del pueblo hacia las víctimas del fascismo	10'	1936	SIE Films	
Teruel ha caido	10'	1937	SIE Films	
La toma de Teruel	7'	1937	SIE Films	
Tres fechas gloriosas	20'	1937	SIE Films	
20 de noviembre	10'	1937	SIE Films	

== Works about this period ==
There are some works that explore this period of Spanish cinema:

- Un cinéma sous influence by Richard Prost
- La cinematografía anarquista en Barcelona durante la Guerra Civil (1936–1939) by Pau Martínez Muñoz

== See also ==
- Anarchism
- List of films dealing with Anarchism
- List of Spanish films of the 1930s
