= Catastroika =

Catastroika may refer to:

- A term coined by Alexander Zinovyev, being a contraction of catastrophe and Perestroika
- A film directed by Aris Chatzistefanou and Katerina Kitidi
