= Infowar =

Infowar can refer to the following:

- Cyberwarfare
- Infowar Productions, Greek media company founded by Aris Chatzistefanou
- InfoWars, conspiracy website founded by Alex Jones
- Information warfare, the use and management of information technology in pursuit of a competitive advantage over an opponent
- Psychological warfare
