= The Philippines and the World Bank =

The Philippines' history with the World Bank started in 1945 when they became one of the first members of the International Bank for Reconstruction and Development (IBRD). Their first project with the Bank came in 1957 with the Binga Power Project. Since then, the Philippines has systematically utilized disbursed financing loans from the IBRD to bankroll major infrastructure and development shifts. The Philippines belongs to a voting constituency within the World Bank executive structure alongside countries such as Brazil, Colombia, Dominican Republic, Ecuador, Haiti, Panama, Suriname, and Trinidad and Tobago. The Philippines Gni per capita was also exceeding the targets as projected to achieve middle status, and the country is a pioneer in digital finance as It is the first country in the world to put its entire national budget under blockchain technology.

== Economic overview of the Philippines ==
The Philippines has historically been classified within international development metrics as a lower-middle-income economy. Over several decades, the country's macroeconomics have expanded heavily via purchasing power parity standards to place it among the top 30 global economies by total volume. The macroeconomic makeup relies mostly on the services sector, with smaller percentages in industrial operations and agriculture.

Historically, domestic growth trends and heavy financial streams from overseas Filipino workers (OFW) have anchored the archipelago against harsh foreign market drops, allowing steady growth figures throughout the 2010s. Economic growth has been positive and stable, averaging over 6% in the decade following 2010. Long-term institutional blueprints outline structural ambitions to cross the threshold into upper-middle-income status by accelerating gross national income averages.

== History of the World Bank in the Philippines ==
=== Overview ===
After joining the IBRD, the country expanded its multi-lateral alignment by entering the International Development Association (IDA) in 1960 and integrating with the operations of the International Finance Corporation (IFC) and the Multilateral Investment Guarantee Agency (MIGA) to secure private and public market assistance. Over the years, these frameworks have materialized into multi-year Country Partnership Strategies aimed at targeted job creation, human capital investment, and poverty alleviation lines.

The World Bank regularly collaborates on long-term regional development structures like the Local Government Finance and Development Project (LOGOFIND) to bolster municipal infrastructure. In 1979, the World Bank introduced its foundational 'program loans' in the country. This system tested structural intervention formats, shifting focus toward targeted sectors of the local economy such as agricultural trade and financial regulation.

=== Notable projects ===
Roughly half of the operational portfolios historical focus points center around rural development, climate resilience initiatives, and social programs. The 1957 Binga Power Project established the baseline of this portfolio on Luzon, utilizing heavy infrastructure designs to satisfy early industrial power grids. Subsequent decades brought major physical interventions, including the $150 million Magat River Multipurpose Project in 1978, which developed crucial agricultural irrigation, reservoir, and hydroelectric facilities.

When emergencies hit the islands, funding frequently transforms into humanitarian rescue; following the destruction of Typhoon Haiyan in 2013, hundreds of millions were diverted into localized reconstruction financing. Additionally, the bank provides considerable funding backup to the Pantawid Pamilyang Pilipino Program (4Ps), the state's signature conditional cash transfer initiative aimed at poverty reduction.

Beyond industrial engineering, civic intervention pipelines have targeting early childhood growth, education, and labor migration patterns. Joint programs with the Department of Social Welfare and Development and the Department of Education have deployed tens of millions to secure clinical research and early care delivery modules across regional sectors. Parallel initiatives support the Department of Labor and Employment by addressing systemic issues related to overseas contract workers through financed pre-departure setups and labor market information structures. Recent programs, such as the Fisheries and Coastal Resiliency Project, support the Bureau of Fisheries and Aquatic Resources to upgrade local market ecosystems, preserve marine reserves, and introduce digital platforms for artisanal fishermen.

=== Effects and controversy ===
Independent evaluations show mixed outcomes across rural sectors. While initiatives like the Philippine Rural Development Project improved agrarian accessibility and transport logistics, critics note structural vulnerabilities. Educational assistance programs have expanded elementary test performance tracking, though long-term policy dependency remains a topic of domestic debate.

The historic relationship has also generated substantial public criticism. Research published by the Committee for the Abolition of Illegitimate Debt outlines severe pushback over the bank’s extensive underwriting of the regime of Ferdinand Marcos. Critics contend that early structural adjustment loans were compromised by political corruption, leading to capital flight and contributing to the mid-1980s economic crisis.

Over-reliance on centralized Western financial institutions eventually spurred the growth of regional alternatives. In 1966, the Asian Development Bank (ADB) established its headquarters in Manila, intending to create localized development frameworks across Asia and the Pacific. The presence of multiple multilateral entities has enabled complementary development programs; for instance, the ADB spearheaded the Philippine Energy Efficiency Project to distribute energy-efficient lighting and mitigate soaring household utility costs.

=== Future ===
Macroeconomic growth trajectories are subject to revision due to fluctuations in public spending and shifting international trade conditions. Under the national strategic vision "AmBisyon Natin 2040", state economic managers target the eradication of absolute poverty and the consolidation of a secure middle-class tier over a twenty-year horizon. Economic assessments suggest meeting these indicators requires maintaining an average annual GDP growth rate of at least 6.5%. Achieveing this sustained momentum relies on structural adjustments, including lowering barriers to market entry, simplifying trade regulations, and reforming labor market conditions.
