= Retinne =

Coordinates: 50°38′N 5°42′E

Retinne (Walloon: Ritene) is a village of Wallonia and a district of the municipality of Fléron, located in the province of Liège, Belgium.

It is just north of the centre of Fléron.

== Notable people ==
- Georges Jobé (1961-2012), Belgian motorcycle racer
- Éric Toussaint (1954-), Historian and political scientist

== Image gallery ==
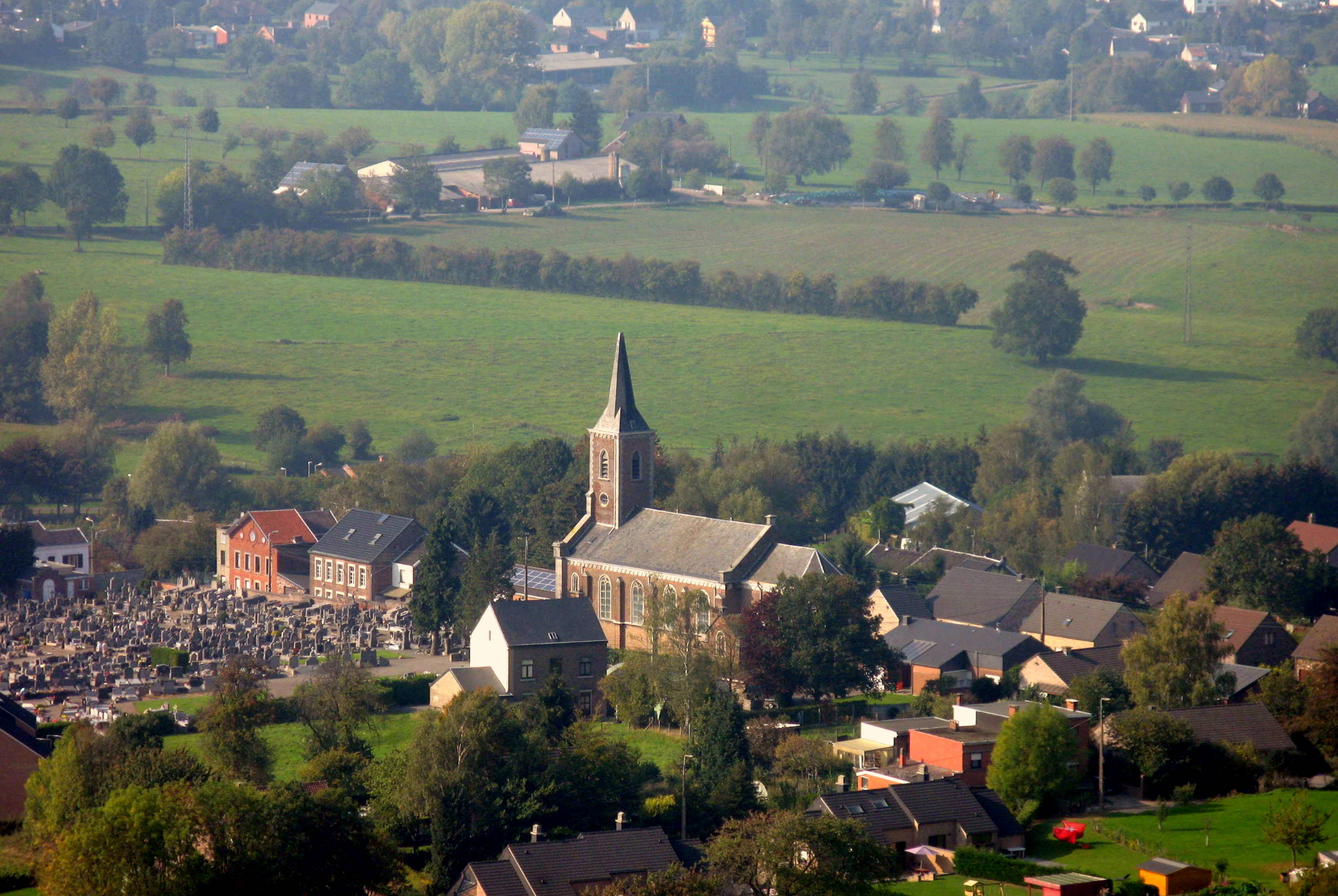
View of Retinne

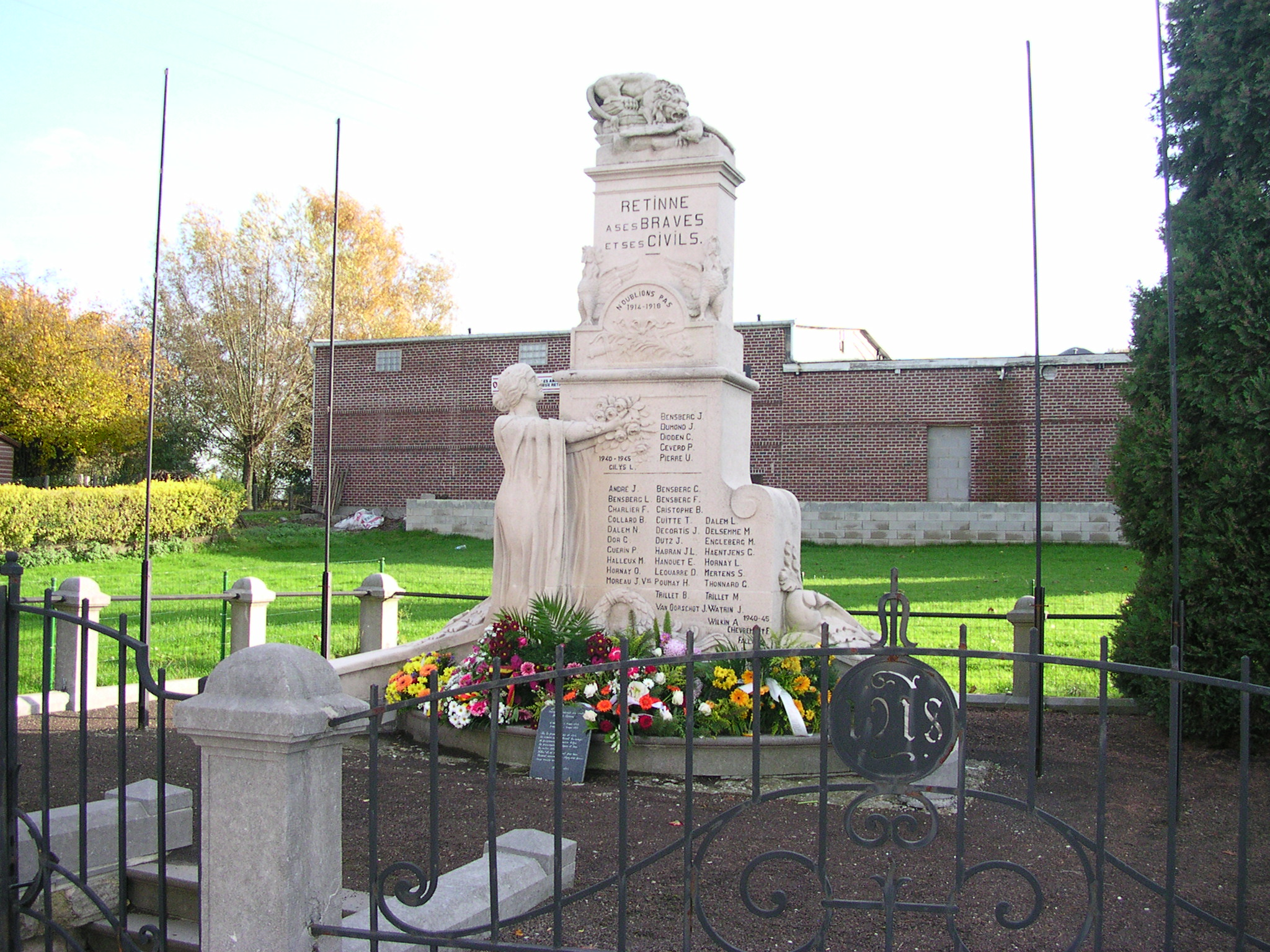
Memorial

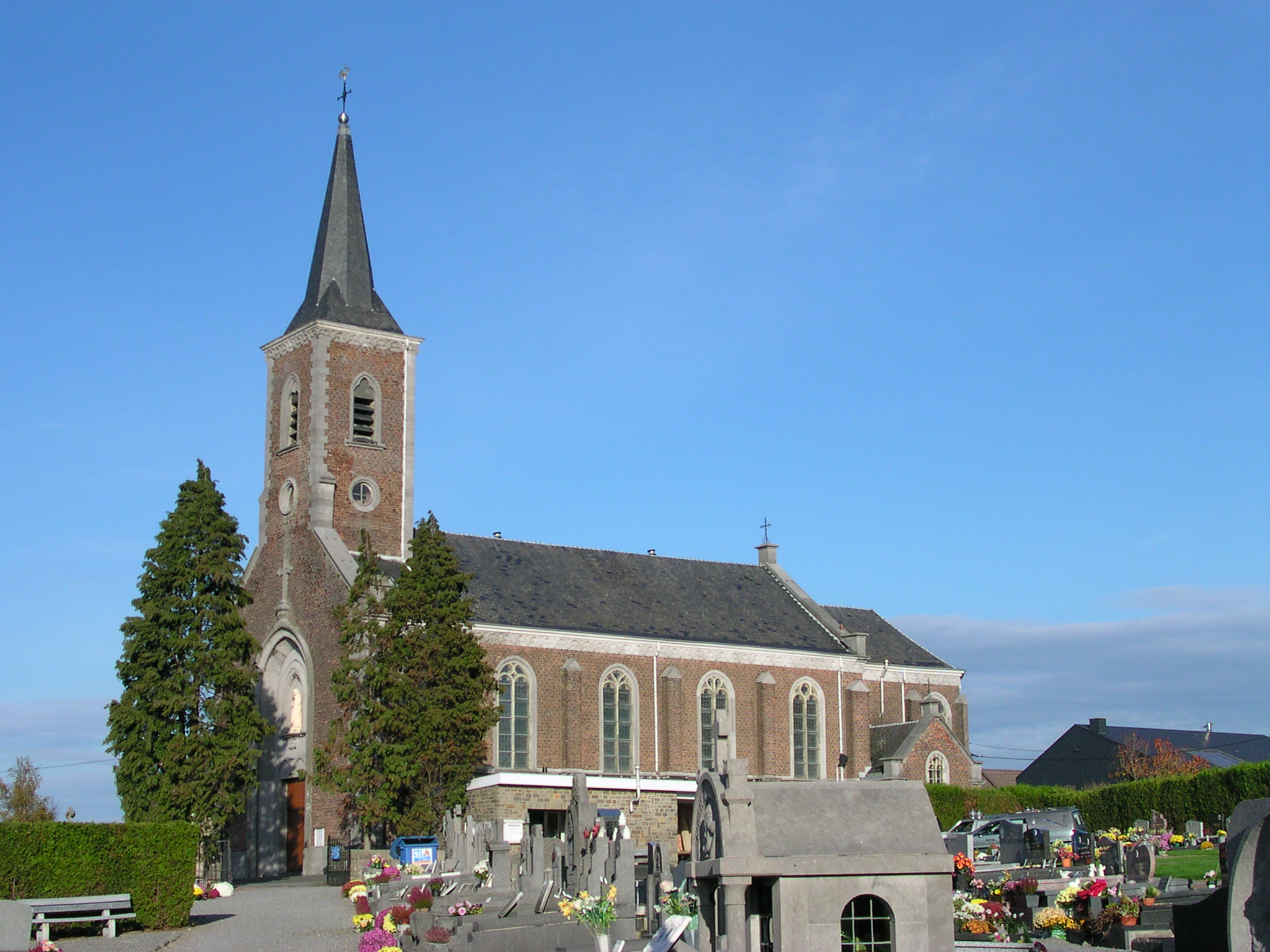
Église Ste. Julienne

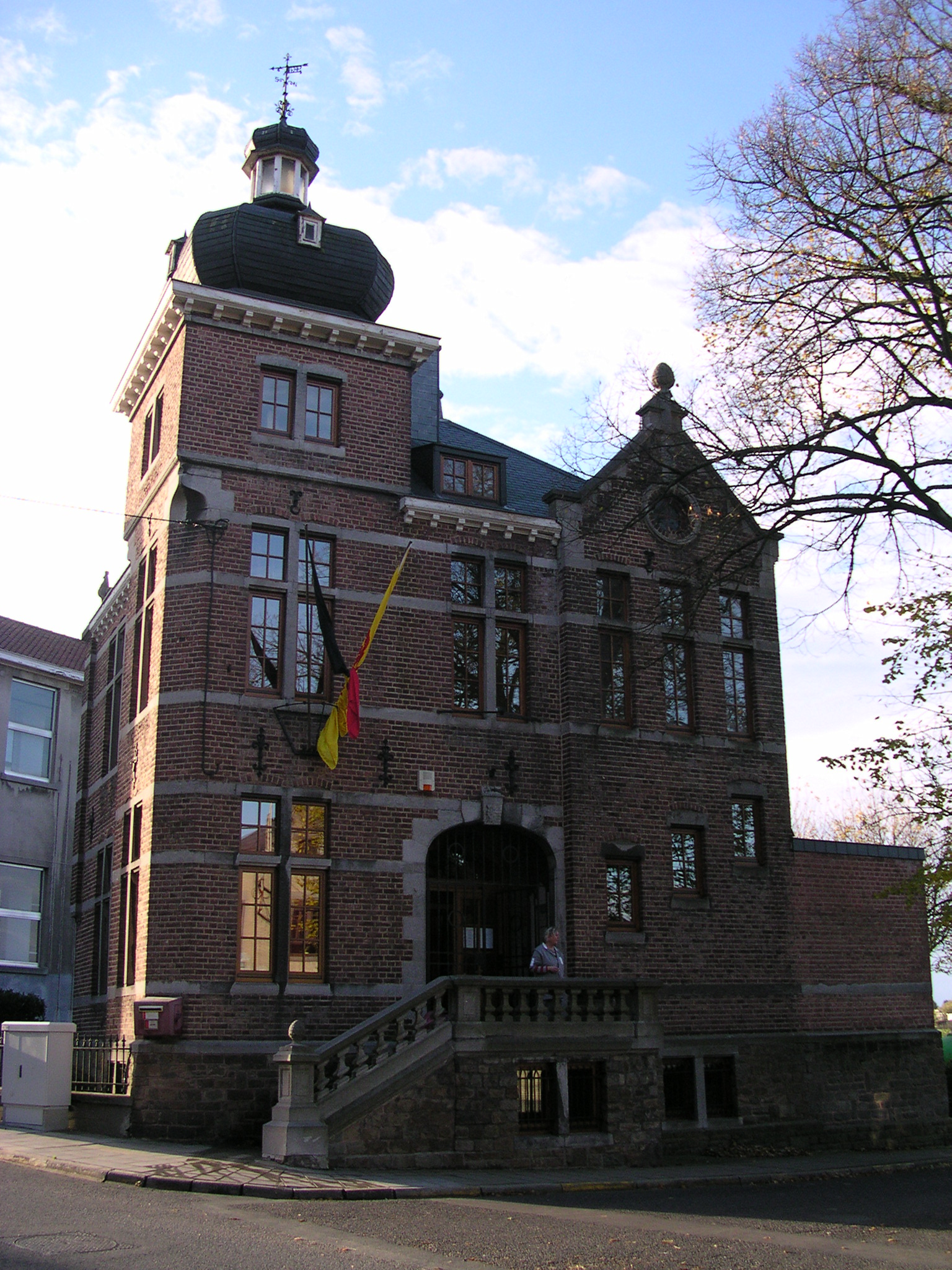
Town hall
