= List of protected heritage sites in Fléron =

This table shows an overview of the protected heritage sites in the Walloon town Fléron. This list is part of Belgium's national heritage.

Object	Year/architect	Town/section	Address	Coordinates	Number^{?}	Image
Facades and roofs of the buildings ^{(nl)} ^{(fr)}		Fléron	rue de Heid des Chênes 38-40	50.624831°N 5.678435°E	62038-CLT-0004-01 Info	
Organs in the church of Saint-Denis ^{(nl)} ^{(fr)}		Fléron	Fléron	50.622229°N 5.683722°E	62038-CLT-0005-01 Info	Totaal van orgels in de kerk Saint-Denis, inclusief het platform en leuning
18th century salon of house, including fireplace, wall paintings and corresponding carpentry, and door ^{(nl)} ^{(fr)}		Fléron	rue Heid-des-Chênes n° 6-8	50.622704°N 5.682711°E	62038-CLT-0006-01 Info	
church of Sainte-Julienne ^{(nl)} ^{(fr)}		Fléron	Voie des Chanoines n°12	50.634135°N 5.699350°E	62038-CLT-0009-01 Info	Totaliteit van kerk Sainte-Julienne (exterieur en interieur, inclusief de decoratie en meubels)
Heid des Chenes site ^{(nl)} ^{(fr)}		Fléron		50.627455°N 5.682004°E	62038-CLT-0010-01 Info	

== See also ==
- List of protected heritage sites in Liège (province)
