= Fléron =

Municipality in Liège Province, Wallonia, Belgium

- Municipality
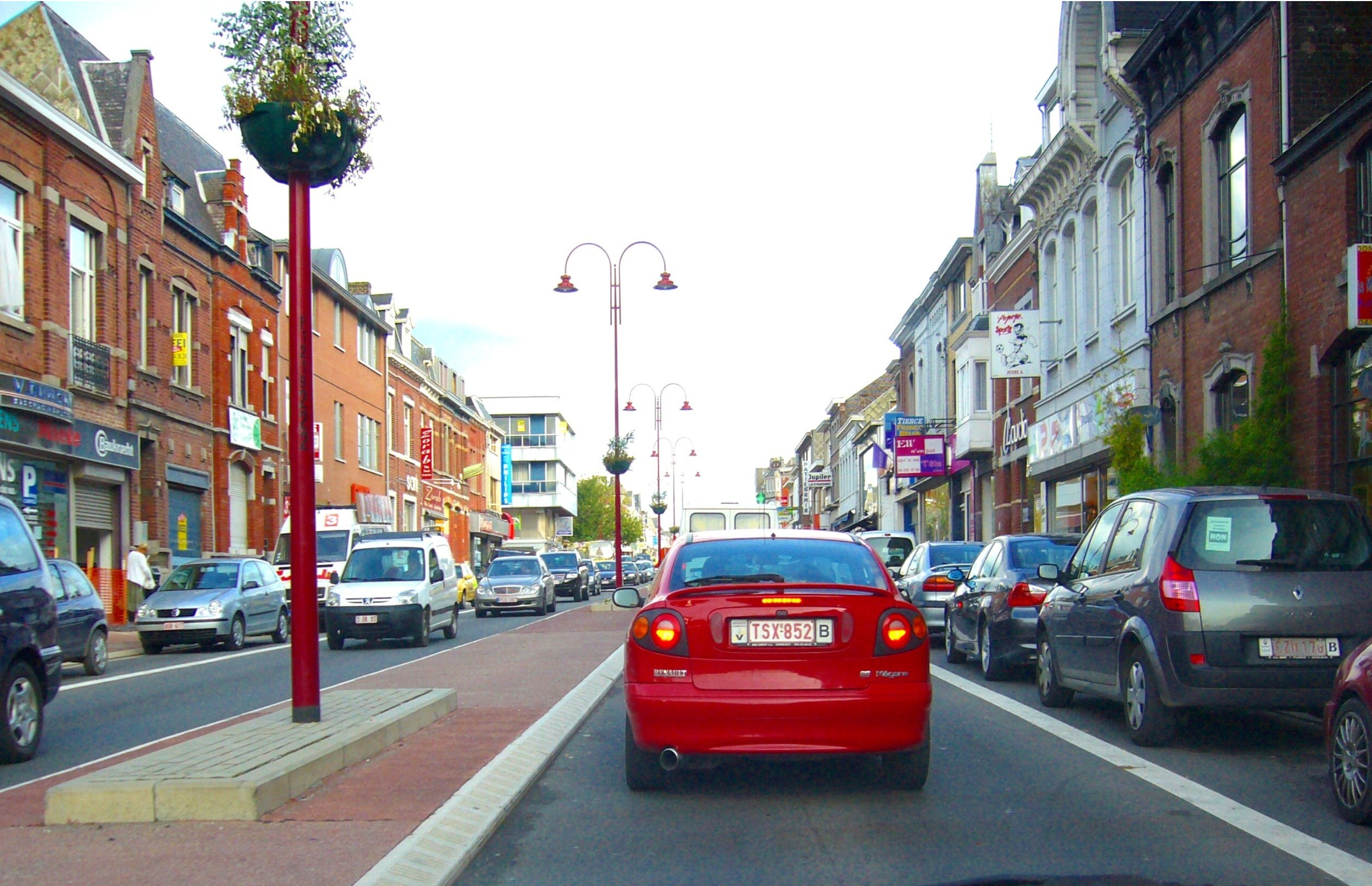

- Flag Coat of arms

- Location of Fléron in Liège province
- Interactive map of Fléron
- Location in Belgium
- Coordinates: 50°37′N 05°41′E
- Country: Belgium
- Community: French Community
- Region: Wallonia
- Province: Liège
- Arrondissement: Liège

Government
  - Mayor: Thierry Ancion (IC)
  - Governing party: IC

Area
  - Total: 13.68 km^{2} (5.28 sq mi)

Population (2018-01-01)
  - Total: 16,495
  - Density: 1,206/km^{2} (3,123/sq mi)
- Postal codes: 4620-4624
- NIS code: 62038
- Area codes: 04
- Website: www.fleron.be

Fléron (French pronunciation: [fleʁɔ̃]; Walloon: Fléron) is a municipality of Wallonia located in the province of Liège, Belgium.

On January 1, 2006, Fléron had a total population of 16,088. The total area is 13.72 km^{2} (5 sq mi) which gives a population density of 1,172 inhabitants per km^{2}. Fléron is east of the city of Liège.

The municipality consists of the following districts: Fléron, Magnée, Retinne, and Romsée.

The reminders of Fort de Fléron are in the center of the village of Fléron.

== Image gallery ==
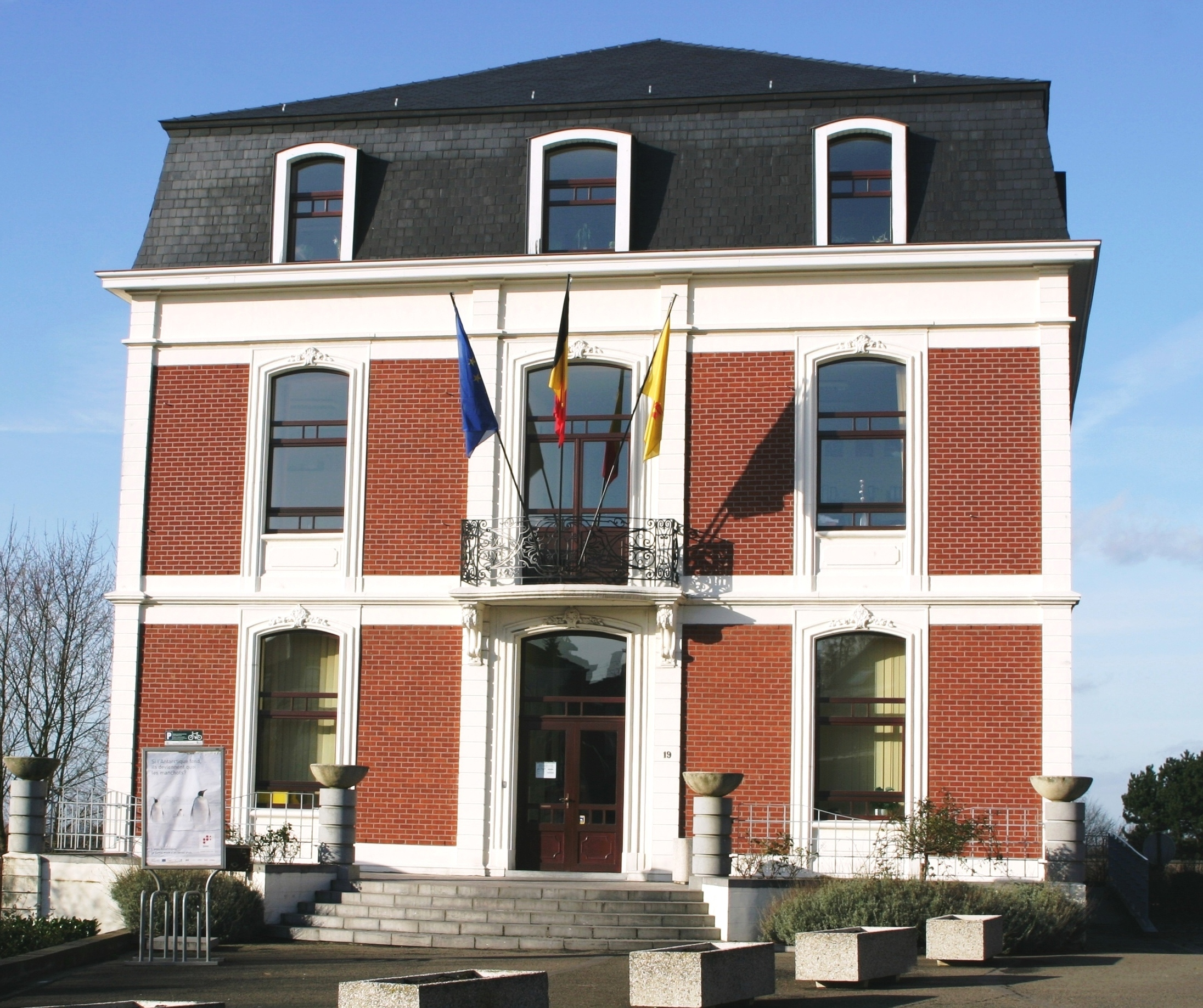
Fléron town hall

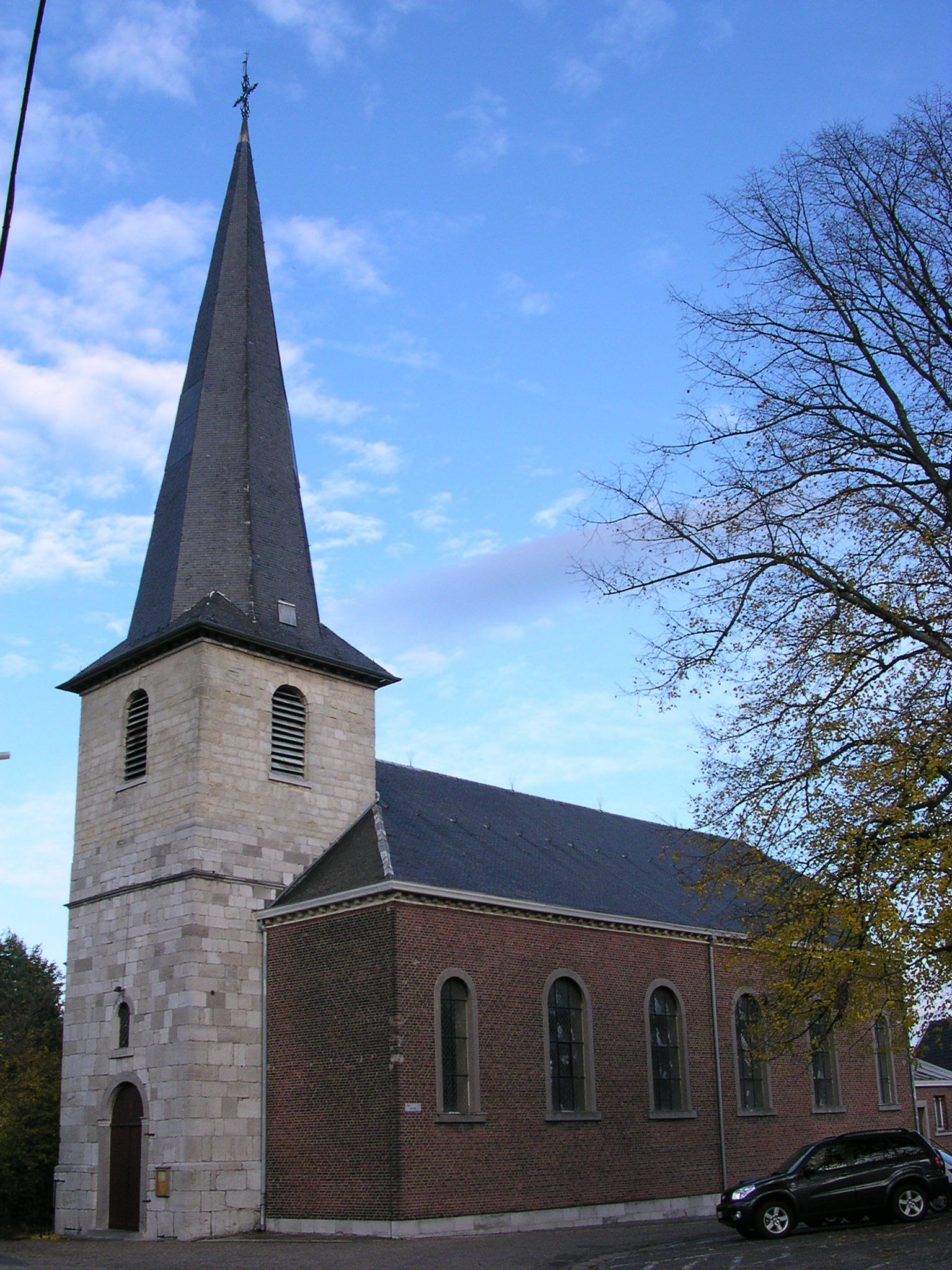
Fléron St. Denis

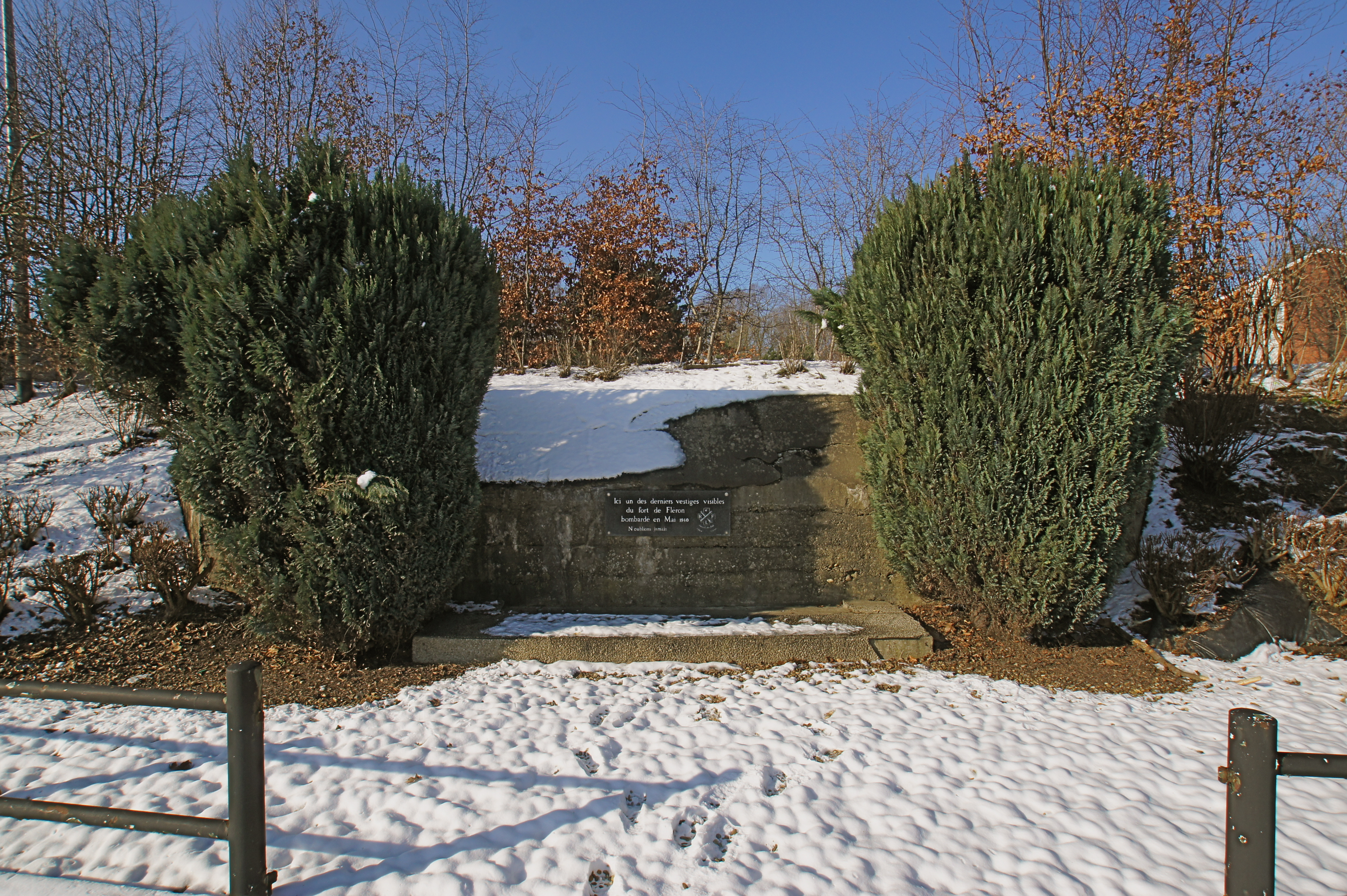
Fort de Fléron

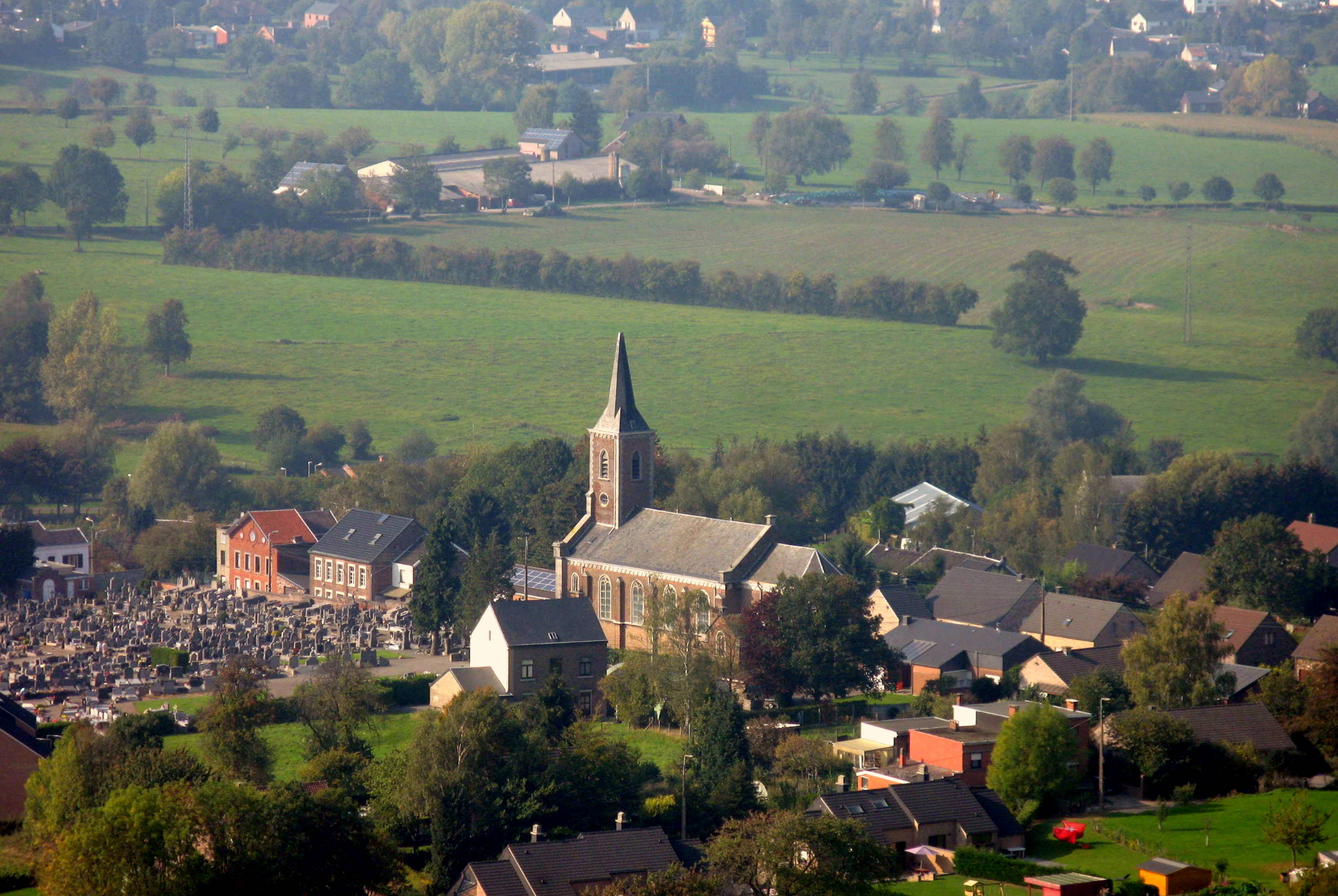
Retinne

== See also ==
- List of protected heritage sites in Fléron
