= Aurora de esperanza =

Dawn of Hope
- Aurora de esperanza
- Directed by: Antonio Sau
- Written by: Antonio Sau
- Screenplay by: Antonio Sau
- Produced by: SIE Films
- Cinematography: Adrién Porchet
- Edited by: Juan Pallejá
- Music by: Jaume Pahissa
- Release date: August 30, 1937 (Spain)
- Running time: 60 minutes
- Country: Spain
- Language: Spanish

Aurora de esperanza (Dawn of Hope) is a 1937 black-and-white film directed by Antonio Sau and produced by SIE Films.

== Plot ==
A drama about the economic situation of the working-class and the start of the social revolution, Aurora de Esperanza opens with Juan, who has just returned from a vacation with his family to find himself unemployed. Searching futilely for work, Juan grows increasingly frustrated. His wife, Marta, agrees to a humiliating job to feed their children, and when Juan finds out he sends them all to the village while he wanders the city. Outraged by the working class's conformism, Juan makes a speech to the workers, while organizing a "hunger march" with the unemployed. They march to the city to protest to the authorities, and the social revolution passes through the village where his family is. Juan takes up arms with them as the revolution marches to the front lines, hoping for a better dawn.

== Cast ==
- Félix de Pomés as Juan
- Enriqueta Soler as Marta
- Pilar Torres as La tanguista
- Ana María Campoy as Pilarín
- Román González "Chispita" as Antoñito

== See also ==
- List of films produced in the Spanish Revolution
- List of Spanish films of the 1930s
