= Angélique Ionatos =

Greek singer, guitarist, and composer (1954–2021)

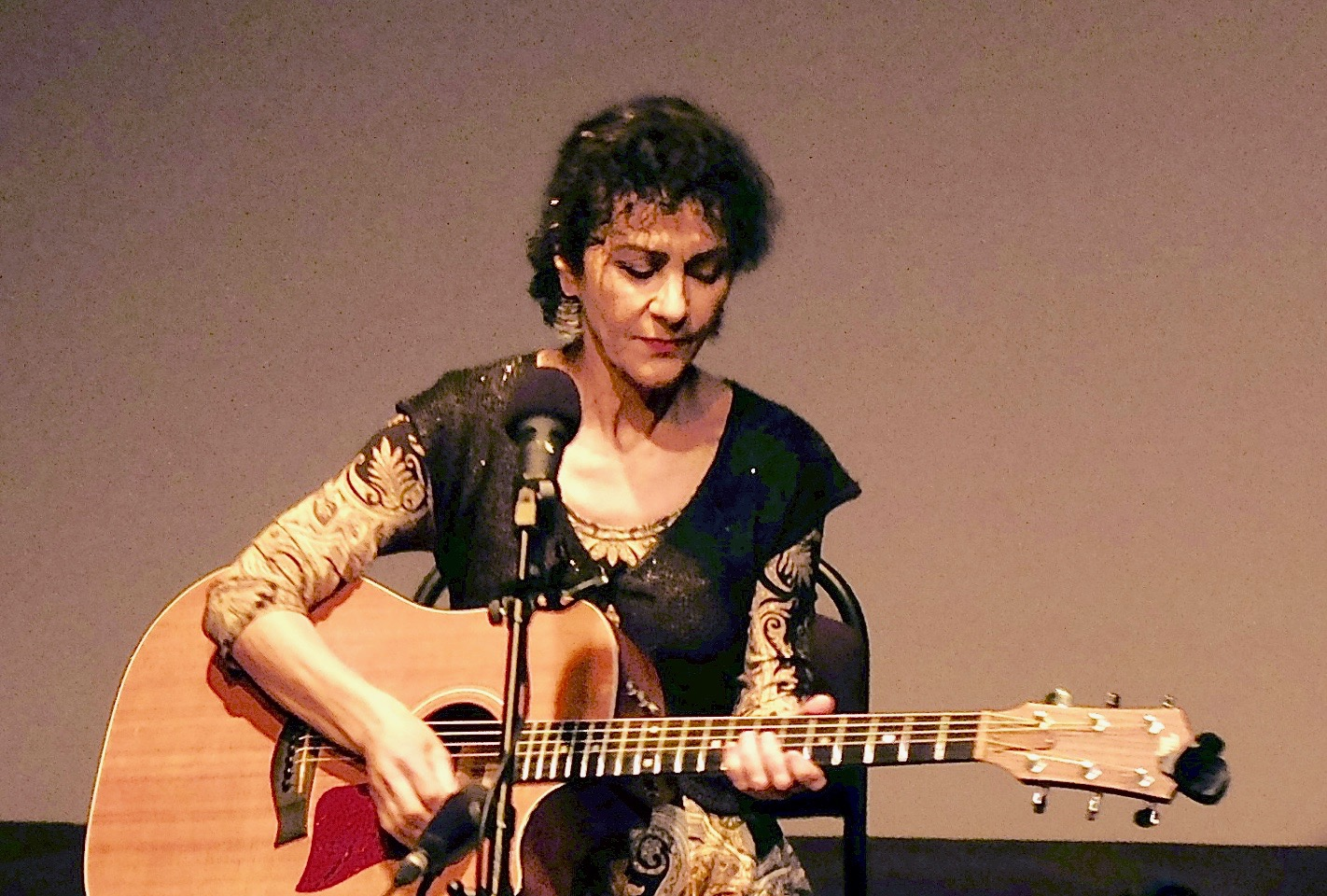
Angélique Ionatos in 2016

Angélique Ionatos (Αγγελική Ιονάτου: 22 June 1954 – 7 July 2021) was a Greek singer, guitarist, and composer. Much of her focus was on setting and singing classical and modern Greek texts. She lived as a member of the Greek diaspora in France from 1981 (Note: Sources differ over whether she moved permanently from Belgium to France in 1972, 1976 or 1981 or earlier: the most frequently cited year appears to be 1981.) or earlier, having originally left Greece, in order to be reunited with her family, as a fifteen-year-old in 1969. Her family's emigration the previous year had come in the context of the widespread political persecution that followed the coup d'état of 21 April 1967, which had seen a far-right military junta take power in Athens. Between 1969 and 1981 she grew up with her parents and elder brother in Liège.

Angélique Ionatos died in Les Lilas, near Paris, on 7 July 2021, at the age of 67.

== Life and works ==
Angélique Ionatos was born in Athens, Greece. She would later describe herself to interviewers as "a sailor's daughter". Photis Ionatos, her elder brother (by approximately four years) is also a musician: Photis Ionatos is still based in Belgium.

In 1972 she teamed up with her brother to issue her first French language recording. The disc, entitled "Résurrection", comprised a series of loosely political "chanson-style" songs. It won for the siblings a Grand Prix du Disque award from the French Académie Charles Cros. For Angélique Ionatos, still aged just 18, the reputational benefits in France were immediate. Her next disc, "Angélique et Photis Ionatos", was also a joint performance with Photis Ionatos. Between 1973 and 1975 the Ionatos siblings appeared in a number of television shows. Most notably, there were several memorable appearances on Jacques Chancel's recently launched Grand échiquier television variety show.

During 1976–77 the professional careers of Photis and Angélique diverged. Paris became the focus of Angélique Ionatos' work, while her brother continues to make his career in francophone Belgium. Both as a composer and as a performer, Angélique increasingly returned to the Greek language. She turned initially to contemporary Greek literature. Although she set to music the texts of many writers, the modern poet whose work most frequently triggered her muse over more than four decades was the Nobel laureate Odysseas Elytis. (Note: Some of Angélique Ionatos' best known Elytis setting are: * 1984: "Marie des Brumes" ("Marie of the mists") * 1988: "Le Monogramme" (seven love songs) and * 1996: "Parole de juillet" ("Word of July").)

She also set many classical texts, notably those of Sappho, using not the ancient texts themselves, but the modern translations of them by Odysseas Elytis, such as the quasi-archaic version of "Sappho de Mytilène", which she performed and recorded with Nena Venetsanou. During a recording career lasting more than forty years Angélique Ionatos produced 19 albums: many were co-productions with either the Théâtre de la Ville in the centre of Paris or the Théâtre de Sartrouville, on the western edge of the city. She had already held an appointment as one of a small team of "artistes associées" at the Théâtre de Sartrouville. The job title and position were the "invention" of the theatre's long-standing pioneering director, Claude Sévenier. In 2006 Angélique Ionatos and Katerina Fotinaki met each other at a "Sappho de Mytilène revival" show in Lausanne. Since that time the two frequently performed together. Like Ionatos, Fotinaki is a guitarist-singer, and part of the Greek diaspora in Paris.

Commentators find it hard to pigeon-hole the music choices of Angélique Ionatos. Her own composition is enmeshed in the prosody of poetry: the music that follows is rooted in Greek culture. With the lumpy uneven rhythms characteristic of traditional Greek music, her compositions can appear boisterous and rough. Her style is nevertheless very far removed from the Bouzouki and Rebetiko, familiar from the compositions and arrangements of Mikis Theodorakis. Classical, jazz, chanson, oriental and tango traditions and currents are entwined together. A French jazz-journalist once described her guitar playing as unique, resolute and exuding gracefulness. Her voice he found warm but not heavy, and at the same time dramatic, with the charismatic presence of the great Mediterranean singers.
