= Juan Bautista Bairoletto =

Argentine outlaw

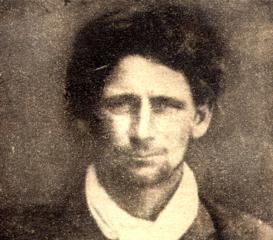
- Born: November 11, 1894; Santa Fe Province, Argentina
- Died: September 14, 1941 (aged 46); General Alvear, Mendoza Province, Argentina
- Other names: J.B. Vairoletto, El Robin Hood criollo
- Occupations: Outlaw, bandit
- Known for: Being an Argentine outlaw and folk hero ("The Creole Robin Hood")

Juan Bautista Bairoletto or J.B. Vairoletto (November 11, 1894 – September 14, 1941), was an Argentine outlaw born in Santa Fe province, the son of Italian immigrants. Bailoretto fled from justice after killing a sheriff because of "lover matters" with a prostitute in Castex, a little town in La Pampa Province. This bandit was called the "Argentine Robin Hood" or El Robin Hood criollo ("The Creole Robin Hood") and became a myth in Argentina after his death. He was shot and killed on September 14, 1941 amid a police ambush at his home in General Alvear, Mendoza, where he had settled some years before.

== In popular culture ==
The 1985 film La Aventura de un rebelde describes his life as outlaw. Argentinian musician Leon Gieco composed a song Bandidos Rurales about Bairoletto and others Argentinian rural bandits.
