= Bairoletto, la aventura de un rebelde =

1985 film

- Directed by: Atilio Polverini; Sebastián Larreta
- Written by: Atilio Polverini; Sebastián Larreta
- Produced by: Atilio Polverini; Sebastián Larreta
- Cinematography: Aníbal Di Salvo
- Edited by: Remo Charbonello
- Music by: Mario Maurano; Luis María Serra
- Distributed by: Shaslar Films
- Release date: 3 October 1985
- Running time: 90 minutes
- Country: Argentina
- Language: Spanish

Bairoletto, la aventura de un rebelde is a 1985 Argentine historical drama about Juan Bautista Bairoletto directed and written by Atilio Polverini and Sebastián Larreta.

== Synopsis ==
Juan Bautista Bairoletto, a notorious bandit from the early 20th century, gained widespread recognition as the "Robin Hood of the Pampas."

== Cast ==
- Arturo Bonín ... Bairoletto
- Luisina Brando
- Camila Perissé
- Franklin Caicedo
- Rudy Chernicoff
- María Vaner
- Augusto Larreta
- Ernesto Michel
- Jorge Velurtas
- Raúl Florido
- Oscar Arrese
- Sebastián Larreta
- Esther Goris
- Ricardo Alanis ... Vallejos
- Ana María Ambas
- José Andrada
- Inés Belgrano
- Cristina Fernández
- Ricardo Ibarlin
- Ricardo Jordán
- Alberto Lago
- Claudio Martínez
- Miguel Ángel Martínez
- Jorge Martín
- Miguel Ángel Porro
- Carlos Roffé
- Rolly Serrano ... Soto
