= Barrios bajos =

The Slums
- Barrios bajos
- Directed by: Pedro Puche
- Produced by: SIE Films
- Cinematography: José María Beltrán
- Edited by: Juan Pallejá
- Music by: Joan Dotras i Vila
- Release date: July 19, 1937 (Spain)
- Running time: 94 minutes
- Country: Spain
- Language: Spanish

Barrios bajos (The Slums) is a 1937 Spanish black-and-white film directed by Pedro Puche. It is a melodrama that has been noted to possess some formal elements that foreshadowed neorealist cinema. It was produced by a team of the anarchist Union of the Entertainment Industry Films (SIE Films) while film production in Barcelona was collectivized by the CNT.

== Plot ==
The plot concerns an erotic triangle formed by Ricardo, a lawyer who has assassinated the lover of his wife and is searching a place to hide from the police; Rosa, a young attractive woman who had to leave the wealthy house where she worked as a maid because of a case of sexual harassment by the owner of the house; and El Valencia, a port worker who hides Ricardo as a repayment for an old case in which Ricardo defended him on the court and who defends Rosa from an evil procurer, Floreal. El Valencia is the protagonist and the hero of the film, opposed to the evil Floreal.

After killing the lover of his wife, Ricardo (the lawyer) hides in Casa Paco, the hostel where El Valencia (the port worker) lives in El Raval (The Slums or the Barrios bajos) area of Barcelona. El Valencia owes to Ricardo because the latter had helped him in the past when he had problems with justice. El Valencia besides hiding Ricardo comes up with a plan for him to escape from Spain. In the same hostel arrives Rosa who is unemployed since she left her previous job as a maid after her boss tried to rape her. El Valencia finds a job for her in the hostel to save her from being prostituted by Floreal who engages in sex trafficking and who, with the help of a bawd tries to make her work in a brothel. Frustrated by El Valencia's intervention that stops the possible prostitution of Rosa, Floreal challenges him to a fight, but when El Valencia is winning the fight, Floreal's men attack El Valencia on the back. Ricardo intervenes and saves his accomplice but gets injured. While Rosa takes care of Ricardo's wounds they fall in love ignoring El Valencia's love for Rosa. Floreal discovers that Ricardo is the culprit of a murder and threatens to snitch Ricardo to the police if Rosa does not become a prostitute for him. El Valencia learns about this and challenges Floreal to a fight, where despite having the upper hand and being ready to defeat Floreal, he gets stabbed on the back by Floreal's men, sacrificing himself for Ricardo and Rosa's love. He then dies in Ricardo's hands giving him and Rosa his blessings. In the end Ricardo and Rosa manage to leave Spain and escape Ricardo's prosecutors.

== Social issues ==
The film depicts social phenomena related to prostitution of low class women, which has historically been common in El Raval neighborhood (where the Barrios bajos refers to).

There are some erotic scenes that were considered very daring at the time of the production.

== Cast ==
- José Telmo as El Valencia
- Rosita de Cabo as Rosa
- José Baviera as Floreal
- Rafael Navarro as Ricardo
- Pilar Torres as Mae

== See also ==
- List of films produced in the Spanish Revolution
- List of Spanish films of the 1930s
