= S.I.E. Films =

- Native name: Sindicat de la Industria de l'Espectacle Films
- Industry: Film
- Founded: August 6, 1936; 89 years ago in Barcelona, Catalonia
- Founder: Sindicato de la Industria del Espectáculo

The Union of the Entertainment Industry Films (Catalan: Sindicat de la Industria de l'Espectacle Films, S.I.E. Films) was a Catalan film producer and distributor active during the Second Spanish Republic, which produced films and documentaries on anarchist and social themes.

== History ==
After the coup d'état against the Republic, film production in Barcelona was paralyzed due to the flight of the sector's entrepreneurs. Faced with this situation, on 19 July 1936, the Sindicat Únic d'Espectacles Públics (SUEP), controlled by the CNT-FAI, declared a general strike and took control of the entertainment industry (theaters, music halls, studios, exhibition halls, laboratories, etc.). On 6 August, after an assembly in which the fate of the cinematographic infrastructure was debated, it was decided to socialize the industry and to organize a committee for the production of films. This union was renamed the Entertainment Industry Union (Catalan: Sindicat de la Indústria de l'Espectacle, SIE), and all the productions that they made, generally propagandistic for the republican side, were created and distributed under the seal of SIE Films. The SIE was directed by the journalist Mateo Santos, who directed the production company's first anarchist documentary, Report of the revolutionary movement in Barcelona. The first feature film produced by S.I.E. Films was Dawn of Hope by Antonio Sau.

The opening sequence of all their productions shows three workers forging metal while they are filmed by cameras as sparks from hammer blows on red-hot metal are becoming the production company's acronym. The sequence is inspired by Diego Velázquez's Apollo in the Forge of Vulcan and pays tribute to the anarchist worker Buenaventura Durruti.

== Technical equipment ==
According to the title credits of Aurora de esperanza and Barrios bajos, S.I.E. Films had its own symphony orchestra (SIE symphony), its own studios (Orphea studios) and its own laboratory.

The Orphea studios were the most important in the 30s of all Spanish filmography, due to their technical equipment for talkies. These studios were located on the grounds of the 1929 Barcelona International Exposition near Poble Espanyol. The Trilla-La Riva studios, in the hands of the UGT, were also on the Exposition site. Other studios and sets at that time, the Lepanto studios, later called Diagonal, were located in an area open to the Cortes, and the Kinefon, later called Buch-Sanjuan, were located inside a block of the old plot of Sarriá. There were other studios around Barcelona and its surroundings, but the most important of all, in terms of the number of films, due to the technical capacity at the time, and historically, was the Orphea. There were also laboratories to process Cinefoto films, and even two dubbing studios, one by Adolfo La Riva and the other by MGM, although it is not clear whether these had any relationship with S.I.E. Films.

According to the credit titles of Nosotros somos así, the SIE had a children's group (although there is no information if this group was a formal group or was only for this film, in other SIE films there are children and there is no talk of such group).

S.I.E. Films collaborated on multiple occasions with the CNT and the AIT as a producer of propaganda documentaries, despite these organizations having their own film production service.

== Filmography ==
SIE's production was focused on three editorial lines: war reports, propaganda documentaries and fictional short and feature films. Some of the films and documentaries produced by S.I.E. Films were as follows:

- Alas negras (1937)
- Aragón trabaja y lucha (1936)
- Aurora de esperanza (1937)
- Así vive Cataluña (1938)
- ¡¡Ayuda en Madrid!! (1936)
- Barrios bajos (1937)
- Bombas sobre el Ebro (1938)
- Cataluña (1937)
- Columna de hierro (1937)
- División heroica (En el frente de Huesca) (1937)
- El acero libertario (1937)
- El cerco de Huesca (1937)
- El ejército de la victoria. Un episodio: Casa Ambrosio (1937)
- El frente y la retaguardia (1937)
- En la brecha (1937)
- Forjando la victoria (1937)
- Frente de Teruel (1937)
- Fury Over Spain (1937)
- Imágenes de retaguardia (1938)
- La columna de hierro (Hacia Teruel) (1937)
- La conquista del Carrascal de Chimillas (Frente de Huesca) (1936)
- La última (1937)
- Madera (1937)
- Marimba (1937)
- No quiero, no quiero (1938)
- Nosotros somos así (1936)
- Paquete, el fotógrafo público número uno (1938)
- Reportaje del movimiento revolucionario en Barcelona (1936)
- Salvaguardia del miliciano (1937)
- Siétamo (1936)
- Teruel ha caído (1937)
- Un pueblo en armas (1937)

== See also ==
- CEA Studios

== Bibliography ==
- Campbell, Russell; Porton, Richard (2009). Anarchist Film and Video. PM Press. ISBN 9781604860504.
