= Éric Toussaint =

Belgian historian and political scientist

Éric Toussaint is a historian and political scientist with a PhD from the universities of Paris VIII and Liège. He is spokesperson for the Committee for the Abolition of Illegitimate Debt (CADTM) international network, and sits on the Scientific Council of ATTAC France. He was the scientific coordinator of the Greek Truth Commission on Public Debt from April 2015 to November 2015.

== Biography ==
Born in Namur in 1954, Éric Toussaint lived in the mining village of Retinne, near Liège (Belgium), where his parents were teachers. Retinne had a population of 2,500 people of more than thirty different nationalities. At the age of thirteen, already present in the struggles of that time (opposition to the War in Vietnam and racism, and supporting workers' struggles and the Prague Spring among others), he joined the students' union branch of the General Labour Federation of Belgium. In 1968, he took part in launching a pupils' movement that spread to several schools.

In 1970, Toussaint joined the Fourth International and helped to create the Workers Revolutionary League (Ligue révolutionnaire des travailleurs – LRT) in May 1970, and became a member of its politburo alongside Ernest Mandel. Since 1980, he has been a member of the Fourth International's United Secretariat and International Committee.

== Professional and political work ==
Éric Toussaint held senior positions in the public service union CGSP – teaching branch. Between 1975 and 1994, he actively participated in numerous popular mobilizations (teachers, steelworkers, municipal workers ...). The 1980s were marked by numerous strikes, either to improve public services (including public education), or for structural anti-capitalist reforms, or again to resist the neoliberal offensive. He was particularly active in strikes and workers' movements in Liège (where he was a teacher) where the population was overwhelmed by the burden of the city's public debt throughout the 1980s.

The notion of international solidarity has had an ever growing influence in his activities and reflections: solidarity with the strikers in Poland in 1980, the British miners in 1984–1985, support for revolutionary experiences by organizing voluntary work brigades to help the farmers in Nicaragua between 1979 and 1989, solidarity against the repression used to quell the "Tiananmen square demonstration" in 1989, opposition to the blockade imposed on Cuba by the United States government, support for the Palestinian struggle and many other struggles around the world.

In 1990, he contributed to the creation of the Committee for the Abolition of Third World Debt (CADTM – Henceforth 'Committee for the abolition of illegitimate debt') and became its president. This committee is now an international network that operates in thirty countries on four continents. In 1999, he participated in the creation of ATTAC Belgium and the World Social Forum in Brazil and its international council in 2001, the European Social Forum in 2002, and the Alter Summit in 2012.

Since 2000, he has been involved with leftist governments and popular movements in Latin American and elsewhere on the themes of debt, the Bank of the South and other alternatives.

In 2003, he advised the new Timor-Leste government on relations with the IMF and the World Bank. In 2005, and in 2008, he was invited by the Economic Commission of the African Union to present propositions on the abolition of illegitimate debts demanded from African countries. In 2005, he took part, with left wing Argentine economists, in the creation of the International Debt Observatory.

With the North in the throes of a debt crisis since 2007–2008, Toussaint has worked for the launching and strengthening of citizens' debt audits in Europe.

Toussaint took part in Ecuador's Debt Audit Commission (Comisión para la Auditoria Integral de la Deuda Pública -CAIC), created by the Ecuadorian President Rafael Correa, that sat in 2007. In the same year he advised the President and the Minister of Finance of Ecuador on the creation of a "Bank of the South". The following year he was consulted as an expert on the same matter by the UN. Also in 2008, the Paraguayan President, Fernando Lugo, called on his experience to launch a debt audit for Paraguay. In 2008, he also advised the Venezuelan Minister for Economic Development and Planning.

In September 2010, Toussaint spoke in New York at a UN Special Assembly to assess progress on the Millennium Development Goals.

Since 2010, he has been involved in citizens' debt audit initiatives in Europe, in Greece, Portugal, Spain, France and Belgiums. He was consulted by the Brazilian Parliamentary Congress on the debt in 2011 and by the Brazilian Economic Commission in 2013. In 2012, and in 2013, he was invited by Alexis Tsipras, the President of SYRIZA to discuss the Greek debt situation. In October 2014, he was invited by the majority Members of Parliament of the Argentine National Congress, working to establish the debt audit commission mentioned in the Argentine "Sovereign payment law" passed in September 2014, to speak in a debate on "Debt and National Sovereignty in Latin America".

In 2015, Éric Toussaint was the Scientific coordinator of the Truth Committee on the Greek Public Debt set up and terminated by the President of the Hellenic Parliament.

== Teaching career ==
Between 1975 and 1994, Toussaint taught several subjects in many public institutions of technical and vocational education of the city of Liege, including history. Between 1980 and 1984, he also taught economics at the André Renard Foundation, the training school for FGTB (General Federation of Labour of Belgium, biggest union in Wallonia and Brussels) activists, in Liège. Between 1994 and 2014, his trade union, the General Confederation of public services – education branch (affiliated to the FGTB), released him to focus entirely on CADTM activities. Meanwhile, he resumed university studies in political science and was awarded a doctorate from the Universities of Liège and Paris VIII in 2004. Since 1998, he has taught at the Belgian Technical Cooperation on the subject of alternatives to debt and global financial flows. During the academic years 2010–2011, 2011–2012, and 2013–2014, he taught a course at the University of Liège on north–south relations. He is also a fellow of the politically progressive International Institute for Research and Education.

== Bibliography ==
He is the author of World Bank: A Critical History (2023), Greece 2015: There was an alternative (2020), The Debt System. A History of Sovereign Debts and their Repudiation (2019), Bankocracy (2015), The Life and Crimes of an Exemplary Man (2014), and Glance in the Rear View Mirror: Neoliberal Ideology From its Origins to the Present.

He co-authored World debt figures 2015 with Pierre Gottiniaux, Daniel Munevar and Antonio Sanabria (2015); and with Damien Millet Debt, the IMF, and the World Bank: Sixty Questions, Sixty Answers, Monthly Review Books, New York, 2010.

- (2025) Who are the CADTM ? What is Illegitimate debt ? An ABC, with Maxime Perriot, CADTM
- (2023) World Bank : A Critical History, Pluto, London, 2023
- (2020) Greece 2015 There was an alternative, Resistance Books, the IIRE and the CADTM, London, 2020
- (2019) The Debt System. A History of Sovereign Debts and their Repudiation, Haymarket books, Chicago, 2019
- (2015) Bankocracy, Resistance Books, the IIRE and the CADTM, London, 2015
- (2014) The Life and Crimes of an Exemplary Man, CADTM, Liege, Belgium, 2014
- (2012) Glance in the Rear View Mirror. Neoliberal Ideology From its Origins to the Present, Haymarket books, Chicago, 2012
- (2009) A diagnosis of emerging global crisis and alternatives, VAK, Bombay, 2009
- (2008) The World Bank – A Critical Primer, Between the lines, Toronto/Pluto Press, London/David Philips Publisher, Cape Town/CADTM, Liège, 2008
- (2007) A Diagnosis of Emerging Global Crisis and Alternatives, Vikas Adhyayan Kendra, Mumbai, 2007
- (2007) Bank of the South. An alternative to IMF-World Bank, Vikas Adhyayan Kendra, Mumbai, 2007
- (2007) The World Bank, a never ending Coup d’Etat, Vikas Adhyayan Kendra, Mumbai, 2007
- (2005) Your Money or Our Life. The Tyranny of the Global Finance, Vikas Adhyayan Kendra, Mumbai & Haymarket, Chicago, 2005
- (2005) Your Money or Your Life. The Tyranny of the Global Finance, Haymarket Books, Chicago, 2005
- (2004) Globalisation : Reality, Resistance and Alternative, Vikas Adhyayan Kendra, Mumbai, 2004
- (1999) Your Money or Your Life. The Tyranny of the Global Finance, Pluto Press, London/Mkuki na Nyota Publishers – Dar es Salaam/Vikas Adhyayan Kendra, Mumbai/Labour Party Pakistan Publications, Lahore

With Damien Millet

- (2012) The Debt Crisis: From Europe to Where?, VAK, Bombay, 2012
- (2010) Debt, the IMF, and the World Bank, Sixty Questions, Sixty Answers, Monthly Review Press, New York, 2010
- (2005) Tsunamis Aid or Debt Cancellation, Vikas Adhyayan Kendra, Mumbai, 2005
- (2004) Who owes Who ? 50 Questions about the World Debt, University Press, Dhaka; White Lotus Co. Ltd, Bangkok; Fernwood publishing Ltd, Nova Scotia; Books for Change, Bangalore; SIRD, Kuala Lumpur; David Philip, Cape Town; Zed Books, London, 2004
- (2003) The Debt Scam. IMF, World Bank and Third World Debt, Vikas Adhyayan Kendra, Mumbai, 2003

CADTM

- Manifesto for Making Another World Possible. CADTM at the heart of movements for another world, Vikas Adhyayan Kendra, Mumbai, 2005

Participation in collective publications

- Ukraine: Voices of resistance and solidarity, A collection of recent writings by Ukrainians and socialists around the world, Resistance Books, London, 2022 ISBN 978-0-902869-25-7 UKRAINE: Voices of resistance and solidarity
- The Routledge Handbook of Global Development, Routledge, London, 2022, 776 pages, chapter 5 on Debt, ISBN 9780367862022 The Routledge Handbook of Global Development
- The Routledge International Handbook of Financialization, Routledge, London, 2022, 532 pages, chapter 40, ISBN 9781032174631 The Routledge International Handbook of Financialization

== See also ==
- Committee for the Abolition of the Third World Debt
- Association for the Taxation of Financial Transactions and for Citizens' Action
- Alter-globalization
