= Aris Chatzistefanou =

Greek journalist and filmmaker

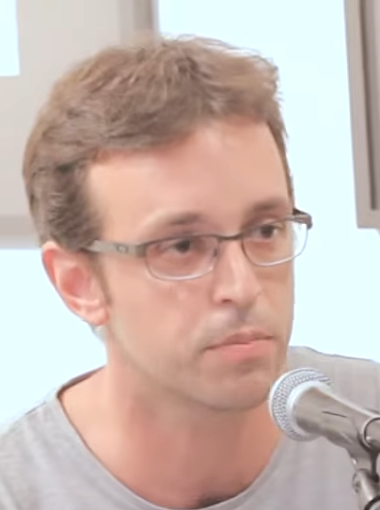
Aris Chatzistefanou

Aris Chatzistefanou (Greek: Άρης Χατζηστεφάνου) is a Greek journalist and filmmaker.

== Biography ==
Born in Athens, Chatzistefanou started his career as a journalist in 1997 at Radio Skai 100.3, where in 2005 he began his own show Infowar, a big success on Greek radio. In April 2011, he released Debtocracy, a documentary co-directed by Katerina Kitidi about the Greek debt crisis, which, despite garnering almost a million viewers on YouTube, was not well received in the traditional media and caused the cancellation of Infowar and his dismissal.

He has worked for the BBC World Service in London and Istanbul, and contributed short documentaries and articles to The Guardian and other international media outlets.

In 2012, he co-directed with Katerina Kitidi, the documentary Catastroika that focuses on the effects of massive privatization in Greece and several other countries. The documentary features Naomi Klein and others. The film was released by the co-owned Infowar Productions.

Aris Chatzistefanou co-founded the magazine Unfollow in January 2013. In 2014, he directed Fascism Inc., a documentary that shows how the economic elites supported fascism in the 1920s and 1930s, comparing it to the present situation. In 2016 he directed the documentary This Is Not A Coup focusing on the effects of ECB and Eurozone policies in the European periphery.
