= Committee for the Abolition of Illegitimate Debt =

International network of activists

The Committee for the Abolition of Illegitimate Debt (CADTM), formerly called the Committee for the Cancellation of the Third World Debt (CCTWD), is an international network of activists founded on 15 March 1990 in Belgium that campaigns for the cancellation of debts in developing countries and for "the creation of a world respectful of people’s fundamental rights, needs and liberties.

== Aims ==
CADTM's main aim is to achieve the cancellation of the external public debt in third world countries, on the belief such cancellation would break a pattern of ever-growing indebtedness by creating economic models which proponents describe as socially fair and environmentally sustainable development. The group describes its supplementary aims as "radically transforming the world's institutional and financial framework"; protection of human rights; strengthening of citizens' movements and activism; and pressuring political leaders to implement human rights guarantees and implementing CADTM and "social movements'" policies.

CADTM also aims to support the creation of taxes similar to the Tobin tax, to increase the official aid budget of rich countries to 0.7% of the GDP, to set up a world tax on large incomes, and for global conversion of military expenditure into social and cultural expenditure.

It aims to suspend the IMF's and World Bank's structural adjustment policies, to radically reform the World Trade Organization, and to achieve strict control on financial markets and the suppression of tax havens.

CADTM claims to support women's emancipation, peoples' right to self-determination, radical land reforms and a general reduction of working hours.

== Leadership ==
As of 2012, the president of CADTM was historian and political scientist Éric Toussaint.

== Publications ==
CADTM publishes a magazine, essays and a website and organises seminars, lectures, debates, training sessions, international conferences and campaigns. It participates in national and international initiatives and in citizens' mobilisations. It lobbies ministers, members of parliament and other politically active citizens.

In September 2018, CADTM's submission to the Office of the United Nations High Commissioner for Human Rights (OHCHR) was accepted as a contribution to the OHCHR's development of "Guiding Principles" for human rights impact assessments for economic reform policies.

In January 2019, The Economic Times summarised a CADTM article by Qian Benli that criticised the Chinese Belt and Road Initiative as not benefiting ordinary Chinese and being heavily involved in corruption.

In February 2019, Democracy Now used a report by CADTM on debt in Puerto Rico to suggest that big holders of Puerto Rican debt, including the investment funds of prestigious US universities, would profit from financing arrangements following Hurricane Maria.
