= List of horror films of 1972 =

A list of horror films released in 1972.

Title	Director(s)	Cast	Country	Notes	Ref.
The Adult Version of Jekyll and Hide	Lee Raymond	Rene Bond, Laurie Rose, Jane Tsentas	United States	aka The Adult Version of Jekyll and Hyde	
All the Colors of the Dark	Sergio Martino	George Hilton, Edwige Fenech, Ivan Rassimov	Italy; Spain	aka They're Coming to Get You!; Day of the Maniac	
The Asphyx	Peter Newbrook	Robert Stephens, Fiona Walker, Jane Lapotaire	United Kingdom	aka Spirit of the Dead	
Asylum	Roy Ward Baker	Peter Cushing, Britt Ekland, Herbert Lom	United Kingdom		
Asylum of Satan	William Girdler	Charles Kissinger, Nick Jolley, Carla Borelli	United States		
Baron Blood	Mario Bava	Elke Sommer, Umberto Raho, Massimo Girotti	Italy; West Germany	aka Gli orrori del castello di Norimberga	
Ben	Phil Karlson	Lee Montgomery, Joseph Campanella, Arthur O'Connell	United States		
Beware! The Blob	Larry Hagman	Robert Walker, Gwynne Gilford, Richard Stahl	United States	aka Son of the Blob	
Blacula	William Crain	William Marshall, Vonetta McGee, Denise Nicholas	United States		
Blood Freak	Steve Hawkes, Brad F. Grinter	Anne Shearin, Randy Grinter, Linda Past	United States		
Blood Orgy of the She-Devils	Ted V. Mikels	Lila Zaborin, Tom Pace, Leslie McRae	United States		
The Blood Spattered Bride	Vicente Aranda	Simón Andreu, Maribel Martín, Alexandra Bastedo	Spain		
Burke and Hare	Vernon Sewell	Harry Andrews, Stewart Bevan, Brian Croucher	United Kingdom		
The Cannibal Man	Eloy de la Iglesia	Vicente Parra, Eusebio Poncela, Emma Cohen	Spain		
Carnival of Blood	Leonard Kirtman	Burt Young, Martin Barolsky	United States	filmed in 1970	
Children Shouldn't Play with Dead Things	Bob Clark	Alan Ormsby, Valerie Mamches, Jeff Gillen	United States		
The Cult	Kentucky Jones	MaKee Blaisdell, Debbie Osborne	United States	re-released in 1976 as The Manson Massacre	
Curse of the Headless Horseman	Leonard Kirtman	Marland Proctor, Claudia Reame	United States		
Curse of the Moon Child	Unknown	Adam West, Sherry Jackson, Jeremy Slate	United States		
Daughter of Dracula	Jesús Franco	Britt Nichols, Anne Libert, Alberto Dalbés	France; Portugal		
Daughters of Satan	Hollingsworth Morse	Tom Selleck, Barra Grant, Tani Guthrie	United States; Philippines		
The Dead Are Alive	Armando Crispino	Christiane Von Blank, Ivan Pavicevac, Vladan Milasinovic	Italy		
Dear Dead Delilah	John Farris	Agnes Moorehead, Will Geer, Michael Ansara	United States		
Death Line	Gary Sherman	Donald Pleasence, Norman Rossington, David Ladd	United Kingdom	Alternative title(s): Raw Meat	
Deathmaster	Ray Danton	Robert Quarry, Bill Ewing, Brenda Dickson	United States		
Demons of the Mind	Peter Sykes	Robert Hardy, Shane Briant, Gillian Hills	United Kingdom		
Don't Torture a Duckling	Lucio Fulci	Florinda Bolkan, Barbara Bouchet, Tomas Milian	Italy		
Dr. Jekyll y el Hombre Lobo	León Klimovsky	Paul Naschy	Spain		
Dr. Phibes Rises Again	Robert Fuest	Vincent Price, Robert Quarry, Peter Jeffrey	United Kingdom; United States		
Dracula AD 1972	Alan Gibson	Christopher Lee, Peter Cushing, Stephanie Beacham	United Kingdom		
Dracula Against Frankenstein	Jesús Franco	Howard Vernon, Dennis Price, Fernando Bilbao	Spain; France		
Endless Night	Sidney Gilliat	Hayley Mills, Hywel Bennett, Britt Ekland	United Kingdom		
The Erotic Experiences of Frankenstein	Jesús Franco	Dennis Price, Howard Vernon, Anne Libert	France		
El monte de las brujas	Raúl Artigot	Patty Shepard, Cihangir Ghaffari, Mónica Randall	Spain		
Fear in the Night	Jimmy Sangster	Judy Geeson, Joan Collins, Peter Cushing	United Kingdom		
The Fiend	Robert Hartford-Davis	Patrick Magee, Madeleine Hinde, Percy Herbert	United Kingdom	Alternative title(s): Beware My Brethren	
The Flesh and Blood Show	Pete Walker	Jenny Hanley, Ray Brooks, Luan Peters	United Kingdom		
Frogs	George McCowan	Ray Milland, Sam Elliott, Joan Van Ark	United States		
The Fury of the Wolfman	José María Zabalza	Paul Naschy	Spain		
Garden of the Dead	John Hayes	Philip Kenneally, Susan Charney, Lee Frost	United States		
The Gore Gore Girls	Herschell Gordon Lewis	Frank Kress, Amy Farrell, Hedda Lubin	United States		
Grave of the Vampire	John Hayes	Kitty Vallacher, William Smith	United States	Alternative title(s): Seed of Terror	
Haunts of the Very Rich	Paul Wendkos	Lloyd Bridges, Cloris Leachman, Edward Asner, Anne Francis, Tony Bill, Donna Mills, Robert Reed, Moses Gunn	United States	Television film	
Home for the Holidays	John Llewellyn Moxey	Sally Field, Jessica Walter, Julie Harris	United States	Television film	
Horror Express	Eugenio Martín	Telly Savalas, Christopher Lee, Peter Cushing	Spain; United Kingdom		
Horror Rises from the Tomb	Carlos Aured	Paul Naschy	Spain; United States		
The Hound of the Baskervilles	Barry Crane	Stewart Granger, Bernard Fox, William Shatner	United States	Television film	
Hunchback of the Morgue	Javier Aguirre	Albeto Dalbes, Antonio Pica, María Elena Arpón	Spain		
I Dismember Mama	Paul Leder	Zooey Hall, Geri Reischl	United States		
Images	Robert Altman	Susannah York, René Auberjonois	United States; United Kingdom		
Invasion of the Blood Farmers	Ed Adlum	Tanna Hunter, Jack Neubeck, Allan Charlet	United States		
The Last House on the Left	Wes Craven	Sandra Cassel, Lucy Grantham, David Hess	United States		
The Legend of Boggy Creek	Charles B. Pierce	William Stumpp, Chuck Pierce, Jr., Vern Stierman	United States		
Love Me Deadly	Jacques Lacerte	Mary Charlotte Wilcox, Lyle Waggoner	United States		
The Man from the Deep River	Umberto Lenzi	Me Me Lai, Ivan Rassimov	Italy		
Moon of the Wolf	Daniel Petrie	David Janssen, Barbara Rush, Bradford Dillman	United States		
Necromancy	Bert I. Gordon	Orson Welles, Pamela Franklin, Lee Purcell	United States	re-released in 1983 as The Witching	
Night of Terror	Jeannot Szwarc	Martin Balsam, Catherine Burns, Chuck Connors, Donna Mills, Agnes Moorehead	United States	Television film	
Night of the Cobra Woman	Andrew Meyer	Joy Bang, Logan Clarke, Carmen Argenziano	United States; Philippines		
Night of the Devils	Giorgio Ferroni	Gianni Garko, Agostina Belli, Maria Monti	Italy		
Night of the Lepus	William F. Claxton	Stuart Whitman, Janet Leigh, Rory Calhoun	United States		
The Night Stalker	John Llewellyn Moxey	Darren McGavin, Barry Atwater, Carol Lynley	United States	Television film	
La noche de los mil gatos (Night of 1000 Cats)	René Cardona Jr.	Hugo Stiglitz, Anjanette Comer	Mexico	aka Blood Feast (1972 film)	
The Other	Robert Mulligan	Uta Hagen, Diana Muldaur	United States		
The Possession of Joel Delaney	Waris Hussein	Shirley MacLaine, Michael Hordern, Perry King	United States		
Queen Doll (Muneca reina)	Sergio Olhovich	Ofelia Medina, Enrique Rocha, Helena Rojo	Mexico		
The Rats Are Coming! The Werewolves Are Here!	Andy Milligan	Noel Collins, Bernard Kaler, Joan Ogden	United States		
The Red Queen Kills Seven Times	Emilio P. Miraglia	Barbara Bouchet, Sybil Danning	Italy; West Germany		
A Reflection of Fear	William A. Fraker	Robert Shaw, Sally Kellerman, Mary Ure	United States		
She Waits	Delbert Mann	Patty Duke, David McCallum, Dorothy McGuire	United States	Television film	
Silent Night, Bloody Night	Theodore Gershuny	Patrick O'Neal, James Patterson, Mary Woronov	United States	Alternative title(s): Death House; Night of the Dark Full Moon	
Sisters	Brian De Palma	Margot Kidder, Jennifer Salt, Charles Durning	United States		
Something Evil	Steven Spielberg	Sandy Dennis, Darren McGavin, Ralph Bellamy	United States	Television film	
The Screaming Woman	Jack Smight	Olivia de Havilland, Ed Nelson, Laraine Stephens, Joseph Cotten	United States	Television film	
Stanley	William Grefé	Chris Robinson, Alex Rocco	United States		
Superbeast	George Schenck	John Garwood, Antoinette Bower, Craig Littler	United States; Philippines		
Tales from the Crypt	Freddie Francis	Joan Collins, Peter Cushing, Ralph Richardson	United Kingdom		
Terror at Red Wolf Inn	Bud Townsend	Linda Gillen, John Neilson, Arthur Space	United States	Alternative title(s): Terror House; Folks at Red Wolf Inn	
Three on a Meathook	William Girdler	Madelyn Buzzard, Charles Kissinger, James Pickett	United States		
To Kill a Clown	George Bloomfield	Alan Alda, Blythe Danner, Heath Lamberts	United Kingdom		
Tombs of the Blind Dead	Amando de Ossorio	Lone Fleming, César Burner	Spain; Portugal		
Tower of Evil	Jim O'Connolly	Bryant Haliday, Jill Haworth	United Kingdom	Alternative title(s): Horror of Snape Island; Beyond the Fog; Horror on Snape Island	
Tragic Ceremony	Riccardo Freda	Camille Keaton, Máximo Valverde, Tony Isbert	Italy; Spain		
Do Gaz Zameen Ke Neeche	Tulsi Ramsay	Surendra Kumar, Helen Jairag, Satyendra Kapoor	India		
Vampire Circus	Robert Young	Adrienne Corri, Thorley Walters, Anthony Higgins	United Kingdom		
The Victim	Herschel Daugherty	Elizabeth Montgomery, Eileen Heckart, Sue Ane Langdon, George Maharis	United States	Television film	
What Became of Jack and Jill?	Bill Bain	Mona Washbourne, Paul Nicholas, Vanessa Howard	United Kingdom		
What Have You Done to Solange?	Massimo Dallamano	Fabio Testi, Karin Baal, Joachim Fuchsberger	Italy		
When Michael Calls	Philip Leacock	Ben Gazzara, Elizabeth Ashley, Michael Douglas	United States	Television film	
You'll Like My Mother	Lamont Johnson	Patty Duke, Rosemary Murphy, Sian Barbara Allen	United States		

== Sources ==
- Chibnall, Steve; Petley, Julian, eds. (2002). British Horror Cinema. New York City, New York: Routledge. ISBN 978-0-415-23003-2.
- Deal, David (2007). Television Fright Films of the 1970s. Jefferson, North Carolina: McFarland. ISBN 978-0-786-42929-5.
- Hardy, Phil, ed. (1995). The Overlook Film Encyclopedia. Vol. 3. Overlook Press. ISBN 0-87951-624-0.
- Hirschhorn, Clive (2000). The Universal Story. London, England: Hamlyn. ISBN 978-0-600-59736-0.
- Meyers, Ric (2011) [1983]. For One Week Only: The World of Exploitation Films. Guildford, Connecticut: Emery Books. ISBN 978-0-979-99893-5.
- Muir, John Kenneth (2007). Horror Films of the 1970s. Jefferson, North Carolina: McFarland. ISBN 978-0-786-49156-8.
- Rednour, Douglas (September 1, 2017). "Daughter of Dracula". Library Journal. Vol. 142, no. 14. New York City, New York. ISSN 0363-0277. OCLC 818916619.
- Sherman, Fraser S. (2009). Cyborgs, Santa Claus and Satan: Science Fiction, Fantasy and Horror Films Made for Television. Jefferson, North Carolina: McFarland. ISBN 978-0-786-44341-3.
- Stine, Scott Aaron (2015). The Gorehound's Guide to Splatter Films of the 1960s and 1970s. Jefferson, North Carolina: McFarland. ISBN 978-0-786-49140-7.
- Thrower, Stephen (2015). Murderous Passions: The Delirious Cinema of Jesús Franco: Volume 1:1959-1974. Strange Attractor Press. ISBN 978-1-907222-31-3.
