= Blanca Estrada =

Spanish retired actress and presenter

- Born: 1950 (age 75–76); La Felguera, Spain
- Occupations: Actress, presenter
- Spouse: Luis Bastarrica
- Partners: Joaquín Ocio; Alejo García

Blanca Estrada (born 1950) is a Spanish retired actress and presenter best known for her roles throughout the 1970s and 1980s in 20 films classified as uncovered cinema.

== Biography ==
Sister of the actress Gloria Estrada and cousin of Susana Estrada, Blanca became known in 1972 as the "hostess" or "secretary" of the first season of the Televisión Española contest Un, dos, tres... responda otra vez, along with such popular faces as Ágata Lys and Yolanda Ríos. The next year she went to work as a presenter of the Valerio Lazarov variety show ¡Señoras y señores!

Her subsequent cinematic career focused on a series of films of high erotic content, among which stand out Una vela para el diablo (1973), El libro de buen amor (1975, with Patxi Andión, considered by Ya newspaper film critic Pascual Cebollada as "a broad sample of masculine and feminine nudity, in front and behind, and a constant tension or demonstration of eroticism illustrated with obscenities"), Metralleta Stein (1975), Dios bendiga cada rincón de esta casa (1977, with Lola Gaos, based on the novel Cousin Bazilio by Eça de Queirós), El francotirador (1977), Historia de 'S' (1979), and The Cantabrians (1980), in which the young star had frequent nude and "bed scenes", which made her one of the most celebrated actresses of the moment.

She also went "a little undressed" in many magazines such as Play-Lady, "where she appeared in vivid leathers," Lib, Interviú, and especially Fotogramas, where she was on the cover five times in the mid-70s.

At the end of 1976, Estrada took part in the chapter of the Antonio Gala series Paisaje con figuras dedicated to Mariana Pineda, broadcast by Televisión Española on 13 December.

In 1982, she returned to acting under the direction of Narciso Ibáñez Serrador, this time in a new chapter of the series Historias para no dormir ("El fin empezó ayer"), along with Manuel Tejada, which premiered on Spanish Television on 20 September.

Separated from Luis Bastarrica, whom she had married in 1970, she has had two romantic relationships, with the Radio Nacional de España broadcaster Joaquín Ocio, who died in 1994, and the journalist Alejo García, who disappeared in 2008 at age 71.

After living for a while in the United States, Estrada currently resides in Málaga, completely away from the artistic world.

== Filmography ==
=== Films ===
Year	Title	Role	Director
1973	Una vela para el diablo	Norma	Eugenio Martín
1974	Odio mi cuerpo	Elena	León Klimovsky
1974	The Ghost Galleon	Kathy	Amando de Ossorio
1974	Open Season	Alice Rennick	Peter Collinson
1974	La noche de la furia	Sue	Carlos Aured
1975	Metralleta 'Stein'	Ana	José Antonio de la Loma
1975	El libro de buen amor	Doña Endrina	Tomás Aznar
1975	Todos los gritos del silencio	Michelle	Ramón Barco
1975	Sensualidad	Lucy	Germán Lorente
1976	Kilma, reina de las amazonas	Kilma	Miguel Iglesias
1976	Sábado, chica, motel… ¡qué lío aquél!	Teresa	José Luis Merino
1976	El taxista de señoras		Sergio Bergonzelli
1976	A mí qué me importa que explote Miami		Manuel Caño
1977	Dios bendiga cada rincón de esta casa	Lucía	Chumy Chúmez
1977	El francotirador	Ángela	Carlos Puerto
1978	Las locuras de Jane		Joaquín Coll Espona
1979	Historia de 'S'	Psiquiatra	Francisco Lara Polop
1979	El caminante	Madre Elvira	Paul Naschy
1979	Father Cami's Wedding	Luisa González	Rafael Gil
1979	Las siete magníficas y audaces mujeres	Eva	Darío Herreros
1980	Spoiled Children	Alicia Ortega	Rafael Gil
1980	Un cero a la izquierda	Poli	Gabriel Iglesias
1980	The Cantabrians	Turenia	Paul Naschy
1981	Misterio en la isla de los monstruos	Dominique Blanchard	Juan Piquer Simón

=== Television ===
Year	Title	Chapter	Role	Director
1976	Paisaje con figuras	"Mariana Pineda"	Mariana Pineda	Antonio Betancor
1977	Curro Jiménez	"El prisionero de Arcos"	Camila	Mario Camus
1979	Estudio 1	"El caso de la mujer asesinadita"	Raquel	Federico Ruiz
1982	Historias para no dormir	"El fin empezó ayer"		Narciso Ibáñez Serrador
