= Susana Estrada =

Spanish actress, vedette, and singer

- Born: Ángela Susana Pereda Estrada; 18 June 1950 (age 75); Gijón, Spain
- Occupations: Actress, vedette, singer
- Years active: 1973–present

Ángela Susana Pereda Estrada (born 18 June 1950), known professionally as Susana Estrada, is a Spanish actress, vedette, and singer. She is considered one of the most uninhibited and provocative sex symbols from the era of the Spanish transition to democracy, and one of the most prominent actresses of "uncovered cinema".

== Biography ==
From a mining family, Susana Estrada resided in Gijón, where she worked as a librarian at the Ateneo Jovellanos. In the early 1970s she decided to move to Madrid to start her artistic career, beginning with modest incursions into café-théâtre. After a short time she had small roles in films by directors such as José Luis Merino (El Zorro de Monterrey, 1971), Benito Alazraki (Las tres perfectas casadas, 1973), Tomás Aznar (El libro de buen amor, alongside her cousin Blanca Estrada), Jorge Grau (La trastienda, 1975), and Amando de Ossorio (Night of the Seagulls, 1975).

=== Rise to fame ===
In 1976, only a few months after the death of Francisco Franco – and with it the end of his regime's censorship – Estrada presented "the most daring show in Madrid", Historias de "Strip-Tease", at the Videoset Theater at No. 5 Calle de la Princesa. In it, alluding to the film Gilda in which Rita Hayworth sensually removes a single glove, Estrada removed everything except that garment. This made her the first Spanish actress to perform completely nude onstage (María José Goyanes and Victoria Vera had previously shown their breasts, in Equus and ¿Por qué corres, Ulises? respectively), marking a transgressive sexual milestone of the time.

The same year, she began editing a sexology advice column in Play Lady magazine. Her opinions were considered so immoral that she was prosecuted 14 times for creating a public scandal and sanctioned with a fine, withdrawal of her passport, disqualification from public office, and loss of the right to vote until 1988, "to the point of being forced to have four bodyguards".

But, far from being intimidated, the actress continued to appear nude in numerous magazines, such as Interviú (in "desnuda en familia", August 1976), Lib, Climax, Papillon, and Solo para hombres. The erotic fotonovela El sexo de Susana was published in the latter in 1979, with episodes titled Entre mis jóvenes muslos (II), Dulce sexo de Lesbos (III), La magia del deseo (VII), and Placeres crueles (VIII). In her public statements, she made it clear that she does not take off her clothes because of "demands of the script", but because she feels like it and, above all, because she considers that the equality of women must begin with total disinhibition when it comes to showing their bodies in public and sexual activity without prohibitions.

From 1977 to 1981, she starred in a series of films of high erotic content, such as El jovencito Drácula (Carlos Benpar, 1977), Sexy… amor y fantasía (Juan Xiol, 1977, with Ágata Lys), and Pepito piscinas (Luis María Delgado, 1978, with Fernando Esteso). She became known for appearing in films which were rated "S", indicating sexual content that went beyond the simple exposure of a nipple. At the same time she released some singles, such as "¡Gózame ya!", "Hagámoslo juntos", "¡Quítate el sostén!", "Tócame", "Voy desnuda, Mi chico favorito", and "Qué calor!", the last two of which were rated "S" for their pornographic content.

On 29 May 1978, the actress, who had already become a symbol of the incipient sexual revolution in the country with her frequent nude scenes and her irreverent language, published a story in Can Can magazine, alongside established authors such as Francisco Ibáñez, Raf, and Roberto Segura.

Also in 1978, the book Susana Estrada húmedo sexo was published by her representative Carlos de las Heras, in which the author describes the artist's sex life in detail, and for which he was sentenced in August 1984 to a month and a day of major arrest, disqualification, and a fine of 40,000 pesetas.

=== "Don't catch cold" ===
The image that triggered Estrada's greatest media notoriety was taken on 14 February 1978 during an awards ceremony promoted by the defunct newspaper Pueblo, in which the actress is seen collecting one of the awards from the then leader of the People's Socialist Party, Enrique Tierno Galván, at the moment when one of her breasts "came out without thinking." She later claimed, "the jacket was opened and I just let the photographers do their work." The future mayor of Madrid warned her, "don't catch cold."

=== Other scandals ===
In early 1979, the musical show Muñecas was staged at the Muñoz Seca Theater in Madrid, under the direction of Andrés Magdaleno, and in which Estrada's partner was a libidinous "robot" with which she simulated sex in different positions.

In April 1981, the musical Machos, rated "S", with choreography by Giorgio Aresu, premiered "in the nature of an event" at the Pirandello-2 theater. On 13 July, Estrada was the subject of a new controversy as a result of her conversation about sex with the priest and writer José Luis Martín Vigil on the La 1 program Mano a mano. This gave rise to a campaign by reactionary elements to force the resignation of the then general director of the public entity, Fernando Castedo.

Six years later, she presented the supershow Machos 87 at the Pasapoga music hall. This time, a kind of gigantic phallus was placed between her legs that she inserted into the anus of one of the dancers. The show reaches its climax when the actress is "crucified".

== Later career ==
Susana Estrada divides her time between Madrid and Benidorm, where she has a music and comedy show. In October 2008 she appeared briefly in Los años desnudos, a film set in the uncovered cinema era, playing a feminist journalist who is avowedly against such forms of expression.

In addition to her singles from the 1970s and early 1980s, she released the album The Sexadelic Disco Funk Sound of… Susana Estrada in 2017.

== Works ==
=== Selected television appearances ===
Year	Title	Channel	Date(s)
1980	Aplauso	TVE	17 May
2005	La Granja 2	Antena 3	28 March, 5, 12, and 17 April
2005	Pasapalabra	Telecinco	26, 27, and 30 May
2005	Crónicas marcianas	Telecinco	
2006	La imagen de tu vida (1.6)	TVE	19 October
2007	La tele de tu vida (1.23)	TVE	15 June
2007	Memòries de la tele (2.2)	TVE	22 September
2008	Yo estuve allí	TVE	5 April
2017	Viva la vida (1.19)	Telecinco	30 July

=== Filmography ===
Year	Title	Character	Director(s)
1973	Las tres perfectas casadas		Benito Alazraki
1973	Lo verde empieza en los Pirineos		Vicente Escrivá
1975	El libro de buen amor	First girlfriend	Tomás Aznar
1975	La noche de las gaviotas	Girl sacrificed at the beginning	Amando de Ossorio
1975	La trastienda	Paz	Jorge Grau
1976	Lucecita		José Luis Madrid
1976	El jovencito Drácula	Mina Harker	Carlos Benpar
1977	Sexy… amor y fantasía	Adela	Juan Xiol
1978	El maravilloso mundo del sexo	Verónica	Mariano V. García
1978	Pepito piscinas	Charo	Luis María Delgado
1982	Pasión prohibida	Teresa	Amando de Ossorio
1992	Comamos y bebamos todos de Él (short)		José Antonio Quirós
2000	Aquellos extraños momentos (short)		Fernando Sánchez
2000	Los años desnudos (Clasificada S) (special appearance)		Dunia Ayaso, Félix Sabroso
2011	Carne cruda		Tirso Calero

=== Selected discography ===
Year	Album	Tracks
1981	Amor y Libertad	"Mi chico favorito" "¡Ven!" "Lograremos volar" "¡Gózame ya!" "¡Qué calor!" "Arena y mar" "¡Quítate el sostén!" "Un sitio bajo el sol" "Hagámoslo juntos" "Voy desnuda"
1981	Historias inconfesables	"Mi chico favorito" (song) "Mi chico favorito" (erotic story) "¡Qué calor!" (song) "¡Qué calor!" (erotic story)
2017	The Sexadelic Disco Funk Sound of… Susana Estrada	"Hagámoslo juntos" "Voy desnuda" "Machos" "Lograremos volar" "Acaríciame" "¡Gózame ya!" "¡Quítate el sostén!" "Espacial" "Hagamos el amor" "¡Qué calor!" "Mi chico favorito" "Un sitio bajo el sol" "Tócame"
