= Return of the Blind Dead =

The Return of the Evil Dead
- Original Spanish film poster
- Directed by: Amando de Ossorio
- Written by: Amando de Ossorio
- Produced by: Ramón Plana
- Starring: Tony Kendall; Fernando Sancho; Esperanza Roy; Lone Fleming; Frank Braña; Luis Barboo
- Cinematography: Miguel Fernández Mila
- Edited by: José Antonio Rojo
- Music by: Antón García Abril
- Distributed by: Belén Films
- Release date: 29 October 1973
- Running time: 91 minutes
- Country: Spain
- Language: Spanish

Return of the Blind Dead, also known as The Return of the Evil Dead or Attack of the Blind Dead and El ataque de los muertos sin ojos (literal translation: Attack of the Eyeless Dead), is a 1973 Spanish horror film written and directed by Amando de Ossorio.

The film is the second in Ossorio's "Blind Dead" series, and the sequel to Tombs of the Blind Dead (1972). It was followed by The Ghost Galleon (1974) and Night of the Seagulls (1975).

== Plot ==
The film opens with a flashback to 13th century Bouzano, Portugal. A peasant mob has captured the Knights Templar and is preparing to burn them for witchcraft and murder. One of the captured knights (Luis Barboo) swears revenge on the village. The villagers (in a break from the first film) burn the knights' eyes out with torches before burning them to death.

The film flashes ahead to the present, where the village prepares for a festival celebrating the 500th anniversary of the defeat of the Templars. The village idiot, Murdo (José Canalejas), watches the preparations until being attacked and stoned by a pack of children. The children are run off by Moncha (Loreta Tovar) and Juan (José Thelman), romantically involved locals.

Back in the town square, firework technician and former military captain Jack Marlowe (Tony Kendall) meets Mayor Duncan (Fernando Sancho), his assistant Dacosta (Frank Braña) and his fiancee/secretary Vivian (Esperanza Roy). It is revealed that Jack and Vivian have a personal history, establishing a tension between the four characters. Jack and Vivian take a walk, where she reveals that she purposely hired Jack to rekindle their romance. Their walk takes them to the abbey graveyard where the Templars are buried. Their romantic interlude is interrupted by peeping Murdo, who proceeds to warn them of the Templars' impending return. After Jack and Vivian depart, Murdo murders a young townswoman that he has kidnapped as a blood sacrifice.

While the festival is in full swing, the Templars rise, awakened by Murdo's sacrifice. At the festival, Jack convinces Vivian to leave with him. Their interactions raise the ire of Duncan and Dacosta, who are a keeping a close eye on the pair.

Back at the graveyard, the Templars ride down Murdo (but leave him alive) and head toward town. On their way, they come across Moncha's house, where she is in the midst of a sexual rendezvous with Juan. Juan is killed but Moncha escapes on an undead Templar horse. She stops for help at the rail station, where she persuades the station manager (Francisco Sanz) of the danger by revealing her zombie horse. She runs off, as he tries to call the mayor.

While the phone rings in his office, the mayor dispatches Dacosta and his henchmen to assault Jack. The beating is finally interrupted when the call from the station manager gets through. The mayor is skeptical, and believes the manager to be drunk. He sends Dacosta to the station to take over. The Templars arrive at the station and kill the manager.

Meanwhile, Jack and Vivian leave in Jack's car. They encounter the traumatized Moncha in the middle of the road and bring her back to town. Dacosta and another of Duncan's goons, Beirao (Ramón Lillo), encounter the knights as they approach the train station. They hurry back to the village and warn the mayor of the oncoming horde.

The mayor calls the governor (Juan Cazalilla) to request help, but his pleas fall on deaf ears as the governor assumes Duncan to be drunk and reprimands him. The governor is the third person (after the station manager, and then the mayor) to ignore warnings of the coming Templars, assuming the messenger to be drunk.

The knights descend on the village and the festival turns into a massacre. Jack organizes Dacosta and some of the villagers into a defense force, as Duncan scrambles to gather his valuables and then looks on from the balcony. Eventually, Jack and Dacosta clear an escape for most of the villagers. Jack, Vivian, Dacosta, Moncha and Duncan are all left behind. They try to get away in Jack's car, but are overwhelmed by zombies and escape into the church, where Beirao and his wife Amalia (Lone Fleming), are holed up with their daughter (Maria Nuria). Once inside the church, the group finds Murdo hiding out.

The survivors begin fortifying the church against the undead siege, but before long, unity begins to erode. After failing once again to convince the governor of their plight, Duncan persuades Beirao to make a break for the car. He is killed in the attempt. Meanwhile, Murdo persuades Moncha to come with him into the tunnels beneath the church to escape. After Beirao's failed attempt, Duncan tries to escape using Beirao and Amalia's young daughter as bait. He is killed and the child is left in grave peril among the Templars. Jack and Amalia manage to save her, with Amalia sacrificing her own life in the process.

Down in the tunnels, Murdo is decapitated by the knights as he climbs out to the surface and Moncha is subsequently pulled by her head through the opening and killed.

Back in the church, Dacosta catches Vivian alone. Resigned to a grim fate, he attempts to rape her before the Templars kill him. Jack rescues Vivian, and Dacosta is impaled on a spear in the ensuing scuffle.

As the night wears on, Jack and Vivian decide to chance escaping. They convince Amalia's daughter that the zombies and her mother's death were both part of a nightmare and then blindfold her as they attempt to silently creep through the square full of blind dead. As they slip past the Knights, the little girl peeks out of her blindfold and screams as she sees the zombies surrounding them. However, the Templars make no move, and then crumple to the ground in the breaking morning light. Jack, Vivian and the child walk away from the village as the credits roll.

== Cast ==
- Tony Kendall - Jack Marlowe
- Fernando Sancho - Mayor Duncan
- Esperanza Roy - Vivian
- Frank Braña - Dacosta/Howard
- José Canalejas - Murdo
- Loreta Tovar - Moncha/Monica
- Ramón Lillo - Beirao/Bert
- Lone Fleming - Amalia
- Maria Nuria - Amalia's daughter/Nancy
- José Thelman - Juan/Don
- Juan Cazalilla - Governor
- Betsabé Ruiz - Governor's maid
- Marisol Delgado - Doncella
- Luis Barboo - Executed Templar
- Francisco Sanz - Station Manager
- Ramón Centenero - Farmer 1
- Cristino Almodóvar - Farmer 2

== Production ==
As in the other three films in the series, de Ossorio wrote, directed and designed the Templar make-up for the film and composer Anton Garcia Gabril scored it.

Ossorio characterized the financing and production of the film as "very difficult... very complicated", and claimed he had never been paid by the distributor.

The principle shooting location for the festival scenes and the church exterior was the Plaza de la Iglesia located in the pueblo of El Vellon in Madrid, Spain.

== Themes ==
De Ossorio described the film as having "political aspects", evidenced by the mayor who looks to abandon the town and save himself when the Templars attack.

Author and critic Jamie Russell described the thematic link between sex and death in the films as "a pessimistic vision in which youth and beauty are always destroyed". Russell asserted that "sex becomes nothing more than prelude...that brings us ever closer to the final end", and that "flesh is simply a reminder of our own mortality".

== Versions ==
There are multiple cuts of the film. The uncut Spanish language version, El ataque de los muertos sin ojos, runs over four minutes longer than the international English-language cut, Return of the Evil Dead, and contains longer, more explicit gore sequences. The opening of the 87-minute English cut contains a truncated version of the Templars' blood sacrifice before the villagers capture and kill the knights. In the Spanish version, the sacrifice flashback occurs when Murdo warns Jack and Vivian about the coming return of the Templars, and contains shots of the virgin's heart being removed and eaten by the knights. In the Return of the Evil Dead cut, Murdo does not sacrifice a local girl to incite the Templars resurrection, and when he's decapitated later in the film, the shot of his headless, spurting neck is removed. Several names are changed and/or Anglicized in the English dub of the film: the village of Bouzano is renamed Berzano, Moncha is Monica, Juan is Don, Dacosta is Howard, Beirao is Bert and Amalia's unnamed daughter is Nancy.

Both versions were included on the Blue Underground DVD release of the film.

SMV - See More Video - released the 97 minute version on VHS retitled as Mark of the Devil, Part V: Night of the Blind Terror in the mid-1990s.

== Reception ==
Rotten Tomatoes, a review aggregator, reported that 25% of eight surveyed critics gave the film a positive review; the average rating is 3.9 out of 10. Paul Corupe of DVD Verdict called it "less a sequel than a complete re-imagining of the first film" that owes a debt to Night of the Living Dead. Adam Tyner of DVD Talk wrote, "Sitting through The Return of the Evil Dead is like wading through one of the later Jaws sequels. Yes, the body count is exponentially higher, the Knights Templar are in virtually every scene, there's an attempt to keep the pacing amped up...and in the process, pretty much everything worthwhile about the original is discarded". Writing in The Zombie Movie Encyclopedia, academic Peter Dendle said that the film was more influenced by Night of the Living Dead than Tombs, as it rewrote the history of the Knights and does not follow the first film's continuity, and noted, "Though Return lacks the charming simplicity of the first Blind Dead film, it does sustain a gradual building of tension more successfully than Tombs".
