= María Elena Arpón =

Spanish actress (born 1948)

- Born: 1948 (age 76–77); Barcelona
- Occupation: Actress

María Elena Arpón (born 1948) is a Spanish actress.

She played Virginia in the Spanish horror film La noche del terror ciego (1972), directed by Amando de Ossorio and starring Lone Fleming and César Burner.

== Filmography ==
- El pez de los ojos de oro (1974) as Amante de Zachary
- Fuzzy the Hero (1973) as Beatrice Rush
- Hunchback of the Morgue (1973) as Ilse
- ¡Qué cosas tiene el amor! (1973) as Secretaria
- Disco rojo (1973) as Mónica
- Las tres perfectas casadas (1973) as Nancy
- Los paladines (1972)
- Tombs of the Blind Dead (1972) as Virginia White
- La montaña rebelde (1971) as Rita
- Black story (La historia negra de Peter P. Peter) (1971) as Novia de Pepe
- El Cristo del Océano (1971) as Elisa
- Pierna creciente, falda menguante (1970) as Criada de Lupe
- Crimen imperfecto (1970) as Mariví (as Elena Arpón)
- Por qué pecamos a los cuarenta (1970) as Secretaria de Federico
- De profesión, sus labores (1970) as Secretaria de Juan
- The House That Screamed (1969) as Alumna
- Soltera y madre en la vida (1969) as Enfermera
- Dame un poco de amooor...! (1968) as Recepcionista hipnotizada
