= Antón García Abril =

Spanish composer (1933–2021)

The Most Excellent Antón García Abril OAXS
- Born: 19 May 1933; Teruel, Spain
- Died: 17 March 2021 (aged 87); Madrid, Spain
- Occupations: Composer; Musician
- Awards: Premio Nacional de Música

Antón García Abril OAXS (19 May 1933 – 17 March 2021) was a Spanish composer and musician. He composed many classical orchestral works, chamber and vocal pieces, as well as over 150 scores for film and television.

== Biography ==
Between 1974 and 2003, García Abril was head of the department of Compositions and Musical Forms (Composición y Formas Musicales) of the Madrid Royal Conservatory, and in 1982 he was elected a member of the Real Academia de Bellas Artes de San Fernando in Madrid. In 1994, he was awarded Spain's Premio Nacional de Música for composition, and in 2008, he was also named a member of the Real Academia de Bellas Artes de San Carlos in Valencia.

He died on 17 March 2021, at the age of 87 from COVID-19 during the COVID-19 pandemic in Spain.

== Classical works ==
García Abril composed many orchestral works and chamber and vocal pieces, as well as music for films and television series such as El hombre y la Tierra, Fortunata y Jacinta, Anillos de oro, Segunda enseñanza, Brigada Central, Ramón y Cajal, La ciudad no es para mí and Compuesta y sin novio.

In 1966, he composed the soundtrack for the film Texas, Adios, a Spaghetti Western starring Franco Nero. Also, in 1969, he worked alongside Rafael Romero Marchent, a film director from Madrid, on the soundtrack of the movie Awkward Hands, another Spaghetti Western. He also composed the music for Amando de Ossorio's Blind Dead series of films, being Tombs of the Blind Dead (1972), Return of the Blind Dead (1973), The Ghost Galleon (1974) and Night of the Seagulls (1975).

== List of works ==
=== Opera ===
- Divinas Palabras, after the play by Ramón María del Valle-Inclán (1991)

=== Ballets ===
- Don Juan (1961)
- Danza y Tronío, based on material by Antonio Soler and Luigi Boccherini (1984)
- Doña Francisquita, orchestral version of the original zarzuela by Amadeo Vives (1985)
- Pórtico de España y América (1992)
- Fuenteovejuna (1994)
- La Gitanilla, based on the novel by Miguel de Cervantes (1996)

=== Musical comedies ===
- Un Millón de Rosas (1971)
- Mata-Hari (1983)

=== Incidental music ===
- Divinas Palabras, after the play by Ramón María del Valle-Inclán (1961)
- Calígula, after the play by Albert Camus (1963)
- Luces de Bohemia, after the play by Ramón María del Valle-Inclán (1971)
- Tirano Banderas, after the novel by Ramón María del Valle-Inclán (1974)
- La Celestina, after the play by Fernando de Rojas (1977)
- Contradanza, after the play by Francisco Ors (1980)
- Doña Rosita la Soltera, after the play by Federico García Lorca (1980)
- Las mocedades del Cid, after the play by Guillén de Castro (1990)
- El Gran Teatro del Mundo, after the play by Calderón de la Barca (1998)

=== Orchestral works ===
- Concerto for Bow Instruments (1963)
- Hemeroscopium, Concerto for Orchestra (1972)
- Celibidachiana (1982)
- Introduction and Fandango, based on Bocherini's String Quintet in D major Op.40 No.2 (1984)
- Three Sonatas for Orchestra, based on Soler's three sonatas (1984)
- Canciones y Bailes para Dulcinea (1985)
- Overture for the Academy of Cinematographic Arts and Sciences of Spain (1987)
- Cantos de Pleamar, for String Orchestra (1993)
- Alhambra (1998)
- Cartas a un Amigo (1998)
- La Fuerza de la Creación, for the SGAE (1999)
- El Mar de las Calmas (2000)
- Three Scenes from the Ballet "La Gitanilla" (2003)
- Memorandum (2004)
- Castilla y León, Patrimonio de la Humanidad (2004)
- Alba de Soledades for String Orchestra (2006)
- Lumen (2008)

=== Concertante ===
- Piano Concerto (1957–66, rev 1994)
- Cadencias, Violin Concerto (1972)
- Concierto Aguediano, Guitar Concerto No.1 (1978)
- Homenaje a Sor, Four Studies for Guitar and Orchestra (1978)
- Concierto Mudéjar, Guitar Concerto No.2 (1983)
- Nocturnos de la Antequerela, for Piano and String Orchestra (1996)
- Concierto de las Tierras Altas, Cello Concerto (1999)
- Concierto de la Malvarrosa, Double Concerto for Piano, Flute and String Orchestra (2001)
- Juventus, Double Piano Concerto (2002)
- Concierto de Gibralfaro, Double Guitar Concerto (2003)
- Alba de los Caminos, for Piano and String Orchestra (2007)
- Cantos de Ordesa, Concerto for Viola and Orchestra (2012)

=== Voice and orchestra ===
- Three Spanish Songs, for soprano and orchestra (1962)
- Cantico delle Creature, for four vocal soloists, chorus and orchestra (1964)
- Homenaje a Miguel Hernández, for baritone/bass and orchestra (1965)
- Twelve Songs on Texts by Rafael Alberti, for voice and orchestra (1969)
- Cántico de "La Pietá", for soprano, cello, organ, mixed choir and string orchestra (1977)
- Alegrías, Cantata-Divertimento for mezzo-soprano, child reciter, mixed children choir and orchestra (1979)
- Asturian Songs on texts by José León Delestal, for voice and orchestra (1984)
- Salmo de Alegría para el Siglo XXI on texts by Rafael Alberti, for soprano and string orchestra (1988)
- Anthem of Aragón, for mixed chorus and orchestra (1988)
- Cancions Xacobeas, Hommage to Galician Poetry for voice and orchestra, also available for voice and piano (1993)
- Lur Kantak, Cantata for large mixed chorus and orchestra (1997)
- Cantos Nupciales, for chorus and organ (1998)
- Anthem for the Charles III University, for chorus and orchestra (1999)
- Two Carols for the New Millenium, on texts by Antonio Gala and for chorus and orchestra
- Chant of the Seven Stars, for chorus and orchestra (2004)
- Salve, for soprano, cello, organ, choir and string orchestra (2004)

=== A capella voices ===
- Pater Noster and Ave Maria (1964)
- Two Villancetes, on texts by Gil Vicente (1966)
- La Amapola, on a text by Juan Ramón Jiménez (1973)
- Three Asturian Polyphonies, based on the Musical Songbook of Asturian Lyrics by Eduardo Martínez Torner (1983)
- Miña Santiña, on a text by Rosalía de Castro (1985)
- Hold the Vision in Our Hearts, on a text by Hellen Keller (1987)
- Cantar de Soledades, on a text by Antonio Machado (1989)
- Caligrafías Misteriosas, on a text by José Hierro (1995)
- Three Watercolours of Aragon, on a text by Magdalena Lasala with optional organ or piano accompaniment (1998)
- Three Turolean Polyphonies, based on the dances of Jorcas (1998)

=== Voice and piano ===
- Collection of Children's Songs, on texts by Federico Muelas (1956)
- Two Carols from "El Alba del Alhelí" (1959)
- Two Songs of Youth, on texts by María de Gracia Ifach (1959)
- Three Lullabies, on texts by Rafael Alberti (1961)
- Four Galician Songs, on texts by Rosalía de Castro (1962)
- Three Spanish Songs, on texts by Federico García Lorca (1962)
- Aunque Vives en Costera, on a popular Aragonese text (1963)
- Becqueriana, on a text by Gustavo Adolfo Bécquer (1970)
- Songs of Valldemosa, on texts by several authors (1976)
- Five Songs from the Cantata "Alegría", on texts by Marina Romero (1979)
- Asturian Songs, on texts by José León Delestal (1984)
- Hommage to Mompou, for Piano, Violin and Cello (1988)
- Divinas Palabras, reduction for voice and piano, an orchestral version also being available (1991)
- Songs of the Alto Duero, on a text by Antonio Machado (1993)
- Three Poetics of the Sea, on texts by several authors (1996)
- Castilla de la Luz, on a text by Carlos Frühbeck (2000)
- Canciones del Jardín Secreto, on Arabic-Andalusian texts from the XI to the XVI centuries, an orchestral version also being available (2001)
- Three Songs on Texts by Antonio Machado, for soprano and piano (2003)
- Songs of Night and Stars, on a text by Isabel Rey (2007)
- Songs of Memory, on texts by Fina de Calderón and José Viñals (1999-2008)
- Songs of the Floresta (2007)
- Songs of the Sea, Love and Sunrise, on a text Ángel González (2008)

=== Chamber music ===
- Sonata de Siena, Violin Sonata (1956)
- Pieces for Flute and Piano (1964)
- Three Pieces for Double Quintet and Percussion (1968)
- Two Pieces for Viola and Piano (1981)
- Two Pieces for Cello and Piano (1981)
- Nuptial, for Two Pianos (1987)
- Cantos del Plenilunio, for Flute and Piano (1990)
- Chamber Music for Children, Twelve Pieces for Violin and Piano (1991)
- Agrippa Quartet, for Piano, Violin, Cello and Clarinet (1994)
- Madrid 1948-1998, for Two Pianos (1998)
- Quartet for the New Millenium, for String Quartet (2005)
- Hispalense Fantasy, for Violin and Piano (2007)
- Offering, for Three Players (2007)
- Boreal Chant, for Flute and Piano (2008)

=== Piano music ===
- Lontananzas, Piano Suite (1953)
- Sonatina (1954)
- Prelude and Toccata (1957)
- Guadalquivir Sonatina (1982)
- Mirambel Preludes (1984–96)
- Cuadernos de Adriana, 42 Children Pieces (1985)
- Zapateado, for 4-Hand Piano (1995)
- Balad of the Arrayanes (1996)
- Two Greek Pieces (2001)
- Three Amantine Pieces (2005)
- Three Baladillas (2006)
- Dialogues with the Moon (2006)
- Microprimaveras, Five Piano Pieces (2006)

=== Organ music ===
- Escala Peregrina (2005)

=== Guitar music ===
- Suite for Guitar (1965)
- Evocations, Five Pieces (1981)
- Mediterranean Fantasy (1987)
- Vademecum, 24 Pieces (1987)
- Dedicatory (1992)
- Sonata del Pórtico (1994)
- Three Urban Preludes (1995)
- The Night of the Secrets (1997)
- Music for Night Owls (2002)
- Dos Cantares (2010)
- Nocturnos de la Luna sobre el Agua (2010)
- Trimountain (2015)

=== Film scores ===
- Torrepartida (1956)
- Las muchachas de azul (1957)
- Roberto el diablo (1957)
- Un Indiano en Moratilla (1958)
- La frontera del miedo (1958)
- El aprendiz de malo (1958)
- Ana dice sí (1958)
- Don José, Pepe y Pepito (1959)
- Luna de verano (1959)
- Los tramposos (1959)
- Los económicamente débiles (1960)
- Trío de damas (1960)
- Sólo para hombres (1960)
- La fiel infantería (1960)
- Un ángel tuvo la culpa (1960)
- Trampa para Catalina (1961)
- Aprendiendo a morir (1962)
- La muerte silba un blues (1962)
- Martes y trece (1962)
- Sabían demasiado (1962)
- Tierra brutal (1962)
- Eva 63 (1963)
- La pandilla de los once (1963)
- Franco, ese hombre (1964)
- Fin de semana (1964)
- La chica del trébol (1964)
- La muerte silba un blues (1964, in collaboration with Jesús Franco)
- La corrida (1965, documentary)
- Un vampiro para dos (1965)
- El tímido (1965)
- El cálido verano del Sr. Rodríguez (1965)
- Fray Torero (1966)
- Lola, espejo oscuro (1966)
- Nuevo en esta plaza (1966)
- Operación Plus Ultra (1966, in collaboration with Augusto Algueró)
- La ciudad no es para mí (1966)
- Posición avanzada (1966)
- Texas, Adiós (1966)
- La isla de la muerte (1967)
- Las cicatrices (1967)
- Culpable para un delito (1967)
- El Cobra (1967)
- Sor Citroën (1967)
- Un millón en la basura (1967)
- Los guardiamarinas (1967)
- Los chicos del Preu (1967)
- Al ponerse el sol (1967)
- ¿Qué hacemos con los hijos? (1967)
- Al ponerse el sol (1967)
- Las que tienen que servir (1967)
- El rostro del asesino (1967)
- Los ojos perdidos (1967)
- Órbita mortal (1967, in collaboration with Marcello Giombini and Erwin Halletz)
- No desearás la mujer de tu prójimo (1968)
- No le busques tres pies... (1968)
- ¡Cómo sois las mujeres! (1968)
- Los subdesarrollados (1968)
- El turismo es un gran invento (1968)
- La chica de los anuncios (1968)
- La dinamita está servida (1968)
- Digan lo que digan (1968, in collaboration with Manuel Alejandro)
- Manos Torpes (1969)
- La que arman las mujeres (1969)
- El otro árbol de Guernica (1969)
- Abuelo Made in Spain (1969)
- Las amigas (1969)
- Las secretarias (1969)
- Un hombre solo (1969)
- Pasto de fieras (1969)
- Verano 70 (1969)
- Las nenas del mini-mini (1969)
- El señorito y las seductoras (1969)
- ¿Por qué pecamos a los 40? (1969)
- Turistas y bribones (1969)
- El abominable hombre de la Costa del Sol (1969)
- Crimen imperfecto (1970)
- El astronauta (1970)
- Cateto a babor (1970)
- Las siete vidas del gato (1970)
- De profesión sus labores (1970)
- El dinero tiene miedo (1970)
- Coqueluche (1970)
- Aunque la hormona se vista de seda (1971)
- Vente a Alemania, Pepe (1971)
- Las Ibéricas F.C. (1971)
- Black story (La historia negra de Peter P. Peter) (1971)
- La decente (1971)
- La graduada (1971)
- Blanca por fuera y Rosa por dentro (1971)
- Hay que educar a papá (1971)
- La Noche de Walpurgis (1971)
- La justicia del buen alcalde (1972, Television Film)
- La noche del terror ciego (1972)
- Dr. Jekyll y el Hombre Lobo (1972)
- El desafío de Pancho Villa (1972)
- El padre de la criatura (1972)
- Las colocadas (1972)
- La leyenda del alcalde de Zalamea (1972)
- El padre de la criatura (1972)
- París bien vale una moza (1972)
- El vikingo (1972)
- Celos, amor y Mercado Común (1973)
- Las estrellas están verdes (1973)
- La llamaban la madrina (1973)
- El abuelo tiene un plan (1973)
- Manolo la nuit (1973)
- Lo verde empieza en los Pirineos (1973)
- El abuelo tiene un plan (1973)
- Disco rojo (1973)
- La curiosa (1973)
- Una monja y un Don Juan (1973)
- El Retorno de Walpurgis (1973)
- El ataque de los muertos sin ojos (1973)
- El chulo (1974)
- Jenaro, el de los 14 (1974)
- Polvo eres... (1974)
- Fin de semana al desnudo (1974)
- Las garras de Lorelei (1974)
- El buque maldito (1974)
- Un lujo a su alcance (1975)
- Yo soy Fulana de Tal (1975)
- Una abuelita de antes de la guerra (1975)
- Los pájaros de Baden-Baden (1975)
- La joven casada (1975)
- Zorrita Martínez (1975)
- Largo Retorno (1975)
- La Noche de las Gaviotas (1975)
- Estoy hecho un chaval (1976)
- Fulanita y sus menganos (1976)
- El señor está servido (1976)
- La amante perfecta (1976)
- La Lozana Andaluza (1976)
- El alegre divorciado (1976)
- Batida de raposas (1976)
- Más allá del deseo (1976)
- Volvoreta (1976)
- El límite del amor (1976)
- El perro (1977)
- Vota a Gundisalvo (1977)
- Esposa de día, amante de noche (1977)
- Tengamos la guerra en paz (1977)
- Abortar en Londres (1977)
- Celedonio y yo somos así (1977)
- El ladrido (1977)
- Hasta que el matrimonio nos separe (1977)
- Estimado Sr. juez... (1978)
- Los comuneros (1978)
- ¡Vaya par de gemelos! (1978)
- Los días del pasado (1978)
- La boda del señor cura (1979)
- El virgo de Visanteta (1979)
- Rocky Carambola (1979)
- Historia de 'S' (1979)
- El crimen de Cuenca (1979)
- Cinco tenedores (1980)
- El crímen de Cuenca (1980)
- Gary Cooper que estás en los cielos (1980)
- Adiós, querida mamá (1980)
- 127 millones libres de impuestos (1981)
- La colmena (1982)
- El cabezota (1982)
- Vivir mañana (1983)
- Los santos inocentes (1984)
- Réquiem por un campesino español (1985)
- Monsignor Quixote (1985)
- La vieja música (1985)
- A la pálida luz de la luna (1985)
- Romanza final (Gayarre) (1986)
- La Rusa (1987)
- Matar al Nani (1988)
- Caminos de tiza (1988)
- El fraile (1990)
- Semana Santa (1992)
- Castilla y León. Patrimonio de la Humanidad (2005)
- Félix Rodríguez de la Fuente: vida y obra (2005, in collaboration with Santi Vega)
- La sonrisa verdadera (2015, in collaboration with Adrián Amador and Pedro Pablo Morante Calleja Y Tórtel)

=== Television soundtracks ===
- Los camioneros (1972)
- El hombre y la Tierra (1974)
- Curro Jiménez (1976, in collaboration with Waldo de los Ríos and Juan José García Caffi)
- La España de los Botejara (1978)
- Fortunata y Jacinta (1980)
- Cervantes (1981)
- La máscara negra (1982)
- Ramón y Cajal (1982)
- Juanita la Larga (1982)
- Los desastres de la guerra (1983)
- Anillos de oro (1983)
- Segunda enseñanza (1986)
- Brigada Central (1989)
- Réquiem por Granada (1990)
- Compuesta y sin novio (1994)
- El hombre y la musica (2013)

=== Solo Violin ===
- 6 Partitas (2019) commissioned and recorded by Hilary Hahn.

== Honours ==
- Knight Grand Cross of the Civil Order of Alfonso X, the Wise (Kingdom of Spain, 16 December 2005).
