= Spoiled Children =

Spoiled Children can refer to:

- Spoiled Children (1977 film), a 1977 French film
- Spoiled Children (1980 film), a 1980 Spanish film
