= Night of the Werewolf (film) =

1980 horror film

El Retorno del Hombre Lobo
- Directed by: Jacinto Molina
- Written by: Paul Naschy
- Produced by: Modesto Pérez Redondo; Julia Saly; Enrique Molina
- Starring: Paul Naschy; Silvia Aguilar; Azucena Hernández; Julia Saly
- Cinematography: Alejandro Ulloa
- Edited by: Pedro del Rey
- Music by: CAM Espana Library
- Distributed by: Federico de la Cruz Martín (Spain, theatrical), Film Concept Group (USA, theatrical)
- Release dates: 8 April 1981 (Spain); 15 November 1985 (U.S.)
- Running time: 92 min
- Country: Spain
- Language: Spanish

El Retorno del Hombre Lobo (The Return of the Wolfman) is a 1980 Spanish horror film that is the ninth in a 12-film series about the werewolf Count Waldemar Daninsky, played by Paul Naschy. It was theatrically released in the United States under the title The Craving and on home video as Night of the Werewolf.

== Plot ==
In 16th century Hungary, the werewolf Waldemar Daninsky is sentenced to be executed along with his satanic mistress Elizabeth Bathory and her coven of witches. Since it is nearly impossible to truly kill him, he is left in a kind of living death, with a silver dagger through his heart and an iron mask affixed to his face to keep him from biting. Centuries later, the dagger is removed from his chest by two graverobbers and Daninsky returns to life. Residing in his old castle, he allows a group of travelling college girls to stay at his castle.

One of the girls locates the tomb of the Countess Bathory and is hypnotically forced by the Countess to perform a bloody ritual that brings the Countess back to life. Daninsky falls in love with one of the girls, Karen. When he realizes the countess has been revived and is vampirizing the denizens of the area, he turns against his former mistress and her vampire slaves to save Karen.

The end of the film features a battle in the crypt between Daninsky and Bathory, and he winds up biting the vampire's throat out. Now out of control, he goes on to bite Karen, but as she dies, she manages to stab Daninsky through the heart again with the silver dagger, thus ending the curse on the man she loves.

== Cast ==
- Paul Naschy as Waldemar Daninsky
- Julia Saly as Elizabeth Bathory, an evil countess
- Silvia Aguilar as Erika
- Azucena Hernández as Karen
- Beatriz Elorrieta as Mircaya
- Pilar Alcon as Barbara
- Ramon Centenero as The Professor
- Ricardo Palacios as Veres, a grave robber
- Rafael Hernandez as Yoyo, a grave robber
- Pepe Ruiz as Bandit
- Tito Garcia as Bandit
- David Rocha as Bandit
- Luis Barboo as Sandy - Bandit
- Alexia Loreto as Woman Killed In Stall

== Production ==
The film had a larger budget than previous Naschy werewolf productions. Angel Luis de Diego handled the werewolf makeup and special effects. Naschy followed this up with a tenth werewolf film, La Bestia y la Espada Magica (The Beast and the Magic Sword).

== Releases ==
=== Theatrical ===
The film saw its premiere in Spain on 8 April 1980. It was later shown at the 1982 Fantasporto Festival.

The motion picture had its North American theatrical premiere under the title The Craving in the Chicago metropolitan area on 15 November 1985.

=== Home video ===
In the United States, the picture was released to home video as The Craving, and more recently on DVD as Night of the Werewolf. Shout Factory also released it on Blu-ray as part of their "Paul Naschy Collection" set.
