= The Economically Handicapped =

- Directed by: Pedro Lazaga
- Written by: José Luis Dibildos; Rafael García Serrano
- Produced by: José Luis Dibildos
- Starring: Tony Leblanc; Laura Valenzuela; Antonio Ozores
- Cinematography: Juan Julio Baena
- Edited by: Alfonso Santacana
- Music by: Antón García Abril
- Production company: Ágata Films
- Distributed by: Radio Films
- Release date: 26 December 1960
- Running time: 92 minutes
- Country: Spain
- Language: Spanish

The Economically Handicapped (Spanish: Los económicamente débiles) is a 1960 Spanish comedy film directed by Pedro Lazaga and starring Tony Leblanc, Laura Valenzuela and Antonio Ozores.

== Cast ==
- Tony Leblanc as José Martín Rodríguez
- Laura Valenzuela as Ana Molina García
- Antonio Ozores as Paco Molina García
- José Luis López Vázquez as Javier
- Maruja Bustos as Nuria Molina García
- Venancio Muro as Timoteo
- Julio Riscal as Pichurri
- Mayrata O'Wisiedo
- Santiago Ríos
- Jesús Puente as Examinador Escuela de Entrenadores
- Juan Cazalilla
- Ena Sedeño
- Francisco Bernal
- Charito Trallero
- Francisco Vázquez
- Margarita Gil
- Fernando Sánchez Polack
- Francisco Pierrá
- José Villasante
- Beni Deus
- Enrique Collar as himself
- Antonio Martínez
- Emilio Rodríguez
- Carlos Martínez Campos
- Guillermo Hidalgo
- Joaquín Pamplona
- Rafael Hernández as Fan del Cantalazo
- Goyo Lebrero
- Pablo Sanz
- Jaime Mayuca
- Calero Parra
- Antonio Delgado
- José Luis Ayuso
- Rosa Cadenas
- Felixin Yuste
- Rafael Cortés
- Conchita Gil
- Pedro Antonio Jiménez
- Santiago Kuo
- Otilia Escudero
- Urrutia
- Francisco Castillo
- Mary Escudero
- Antonio Martín
- Serafín García Vázquez
- Mari Carmen Alarcón
- Juan Ignacio Galván
- Enrique Núñez
- María Becedas
- Isidro Torres
- Marisa Paredes
- Fernando Salas
- Eugenio Dicente
- Rosa Navarro
- Antonio Linares
- José Rodríguez Rey
- Irene Villamor
- Aresi
- Carlos Chamelar
- Maruja Navajas
- Alfredo Taular
- F. Pérez Vázquez
- Elisa Méndez
- Gonzalo Zamora
- Angelines Beoni
- José María Lado
- Elva de Bethancourt

== Bibliography ==
- Bentley, Bernard. A Companion to Spanish Cinema. Boydell & Brewer, 2008.
