= Father Cami's Wedding =

- Theatrical film poster
- Spanish: La boda del señor cura
- Directed by: Rafael Gil
- Written by: Fernando Vizcaíno Casas (novel); Rafael Gil
- Produced by: Juan Bautista Soler; Enrique Cerezo
- Starring: José Sancho; José Bódalo; Manuel Tejada
- Cinematography: José F. Aguayo
- Edited by: José Luis Matesanz
- Music by: Antón García Abril
- Production company: 5 Films
- Release date: 20 December 1979
- Running time: 102 minutes
- Country: Spain
- Language: Spanish

Father Cami's Wedding (Spanish: La boda del señor cura) is a 1979 Spanish drama film directed by Rafael Gil and starring José Sancho, José Bódalo and Manuel Tejada.

== Cast ==
- José Sancho as Juan Camí
- José Bódalo as Father Antonio Bissus
- Manuel Tejada as Ricardo
- Blanca Estrada as Luisa González
- Manolo Codeso as Paco Ventura 'Chapete'
- Gemma Cuervo as Sra. de Cuéllar
- Fernando Sancho as Blas
- Isabel Luque as Lidia
- Ricardo Merino as Ernesto
- Carmen Platero
- Juan Santamaría
- Rafael Hernández as Pedro
- Helga Liné as Mujer del 'Marqués'
- Alejandro de Enciso
- Mary Begoña as Marta
- Francisco Piquer
- Mabel Escaño
- Manuel Alexandre as Alcalde de Reajo del Pino
- Yolanda Farr
- Manuel Torremocha
- Mayte Pardo
- Luis Induni
- Alfonso del Real as Padre del Bosque
- Juan Luis Galiardo as José Lloret
- Tomás Blanco
- Ángel Ter
- Emilio Rodríguez
- Eva Robin
- Carlota Bilbao
- Charly Bravo
- Silvia Robin
- Estanis González
- Sergio Mendizábal
- Guillermo Hidalgo
- Jacinto San Emeterio
- Valentín Gascón as Paco Ventura 'Chapete'
- Antonio Vico as young student
- Emilio Álvarez as young student
- E. Lostal as young student
- F. Marín as young student
- Javier Viñas as young student
