= The Guerrilla (1973 film) =

1973 film

- Directed by: Rafael Gil
- Written by: José Martínez Ruiz 'Azorín' (novel); Bernard Revon; Rafael J. Salvia
- Starring: Francisco Rabal; Jacques Destoop; Julia Saly
- Cinematography: José F. Aguayo
- Edited by: José Luis Matesanz
- Music by: Manuel Parada
- Production companies: Coral Producciones Cinematográficas; Universal Productions France
- Distributed by: Paramount Films de España
- Release date: 16 February 1973
- Running time: 89 minutes
- Countries: France; Spain
- Language: Spanish

The Guerrilla (Spanish:La guerrilla) is a 1973 French-Spanish historical war film directed by Rafael Gil and starring Francisco Rabal, Jacques Destoop and Julia Saly. It is set during the Peninsular War.

== Cast ==
- Francisco Rabal as El Cabrero
- Jacques Destoop as Coronel Etienne Santamour
- Julia Saly as Juana María
- Rafael Alonso as Paco Salomón (La Pocha)
- Benoît Ferreux
- José Nieto as Valentín
- Lola Gaos as Aldeana
- Eulália del Pino as Mujer de Valentín
- Charo López as Dora
- José Orjas as Aldeano
- José María Seoane
- Edy Biagetti
- Luis Induni as El Reverendo
- Jesús Tordesillas as Don Alonso
- Fernando Sánchez Polack as Guerrillero
- Alejandro de Enciso
- Eduardo Calvo as El Tuerto
- Fernando Expósito
- Frank Braña
- Simón Arriaga
- Javier de Rivera
- Fabián Conde as Juez militar
- Gonzalo de Esquiroz
- Fernando Sancho as Juan

== Bibliography ==
- Bentley, Bernard. A Companion to Spanish Cinema. Boydell & Brewer 2008.
