= Julia Saly =

Spanish actress

- Born: Date unknown Madrid, Spain
- Other names: Julia Salinero, "La Pocha"
- Occupations: Actress, Producer
- Years active: 1972-1985 (film)
- Children: Cristian Salinero

Julia Saly (born Julia Salinero) is a Spanish retired film actress and producer. She worked on many films over the years with acclaimed Spanish horror filmmaker Paul Naschy and was one of his favorite actresses. Her career ended in 1985, when Naschy's film production company Aconito Films went out of business. Her nickname was La Pocha, which translates roughly as "White Girl", named after a character she played in a 1979 Paul Naschy film called Madrid al desnudo.

She has a son, Cristian B. Salinero (a.k.a. Berrebe or Cristian Saly), born July 8, 1983, who is a singer, songwriter and digital audio engineer.

== Career ==
Julia Saly played roles in a multitude of Spanish horror films. She has been described as being among the "Who's Who" of the Spanish horror film industry. She is mostly known for her multiple collaborations with film actor/ director Paul Naschy. She also co-starred in two films directed by Amando de Ossorio. In addition to her work as an actress, Saly also served as a producer on films such as Night of the Werewolf (film) and The Beast and the Magic Sword.

The posters from her films can be seen on this website.

== Filmography ==
Year	Title	Role	Notes
1973	The Guerrilla	Juana María	
1975	La endemoniada (aka Demon Witch Child)	Barnes' maid	
1975	Night of the Seagulls	Tilda Flanagan	
1975	Muerte de un quinqui (aka Death of a Hoodlum)	Elena	
1976	Último deseo (aka The People Who Own the Dark)	Marion	
1977	Inquisition	Elvire	
1978	Comando Txikia: Muerte de un presidente	María	
1978	El huerto del francés (aka The Frenchman's Garden)	Elvira Orozco	
1979	Madrid al desnudo	Alicia	
1980	El carnaval de las bestias (aka Human Beasts)	Teresa	(producer also)
1980	The Cantabrians	Selenia, the seer	
1981	El Retorno del Hombre Lobo (aka Night of the Werewolf (film), or The Craving)	Countess Elisabeth Bathory	(co-producer also)
1983	Latidos de pánico (aka Panic Beats)	Geneviève	(producer also)
1983	The Beast and the Magic Sword		(producer only)
1984	El último kamikaze (aka The Last Kamikaze)	Silvia	(producer also)
1984	Mi amigo el vagabundo (aka My Friend, the Vagabond)	Irene	
1985	Operación Mantis (El exterminio del macho)	La seductora Jacqueline Genet / La diabólica Mantis	(producer also) her final film role

== Bibliography ==
- Jones, Stephen. The Essential Monster Movie Guide: A Century of Creature Features on Film, TV, and Video. Billboard Books, 2000.
