= Growing Leg, Diminishing Skirt =

- Directed by: Javier Aguirre
- Written by: José Luis Dibildos; Antonio Mingote
- Produced by: José Luis Dibildos
- Starring: Laura Valenzuela; Fernando Fernán Gómez; Emma Cohen
- Cinematography: Rafael de Casenave
- Edited by: Petra de Nieva
- Music by: Adolfo Waitzman
- Production company: Ágata Films
- Release date: 25 December 1970
- Running time: 90 minutes
- Country: Spain
- Language: Spanish

Growing Leg, Diminishing Skirt (Spanish:Pierna creciente, falda menguante) is a 1970 Spanish musical comedy film directed by Javier Aguirre and starring Laura Valenzuela, Fernando Fernán Gómez and Emma Cohen.

== Cast ==
- Laura Valenzuela as Guadalupe Cardoso 'Lupe'
- Fernando Fernán Gómez as Amadeo - Duke of Daroca
- Emma Cohen as Rosario 'La criollita'
- Isabel Garcés as Doña Ramona
- José Sacristán as Aníbal Trijueque
- Manuel Gil as Raul - Marquess of Corbina
- Enriqueta Carballeira
- Elena María Tejeiro
- Jaime de Mora y Aragón as Pepe Bierzo - Baron of Bierzo
- Mayrata O'Wisiedo
- Álvaro de Luna as Alberto García del Chaparral
- Lola Gaos as Doña Úrsula
- José Jaspe
- Manuel Alexandre as Flirty gentleman
- Barta Barri
- Blaki as Diego Ramírez
- Pilar Gómez Ferrer as Mother of Rosario
- Santiago Rivero
- José Franco
- Joaquín Pamplona
- María Elena Arpón as Maid of Lupe
- Azucena Molina
- María Elena Flores
- Beni Deus
- Adriano Domínguez
- Manuel Díaz Velasco
- Yolanda Ríos
- Ketty de la Cámara
- José García Calderón
- Fabián Conde
- José Manuel Cervino
- Ramón Ferrer
- Alejandro García
- María Eugenia Calleja
- Laly Soldevila as Rosa Ortega 'La Bella Orteguita'
- Lone Fleming
- María José Camores
- Manolo Gómez Bur as Man with diving helmet

== Bibliography ==
- Mira, Alberto. The A to Z of Spanish Cinema. Rowman & Littlefield, 2010.
