= The Ghost Galleon =

- Film poster
- Directed by: Amando de Ossorio
- Written by: Amando de Ossorio
- Produced by: J. L. Bermudez de Castro
- Starring: Maria Perschy; Jack Taylor; Barbara Rey
- Cinematography: Raúl Artigot
- Edited by: Petra de Nieva
- Music by: Antón García Abril
- Distributed by: Belén Films
- Release date: 15 September 1974
- Running time: 90 minutes
- Country: Spain
- Language: Spanish

The Ghost Galleon also known as El buque maldito, is a 1974 Spanish horror film written and directed by Amando de Ossorio and starring Jack Taylor. It has numerous alternate titles, including The Blind Dead 3, Horror of the Zombies and Ship of Zombies. In Germany it was released as The Ghost Ship of the Swimming Corpses (German: Das Geisterschiff der schwimmenden Leichen), though the German theatrical poster also has the title The Ghost Ship of the Blind Dead on it.

The film is the third in Ossorio's "Blind Dead" series, and the sequel to Tombs of the Blind Dead (1972) and Return of the Blind Dead (1973). It was followed by the final entry, Night of the Seagulls (1975).

== Plot ==
A pair of swimsuit models are out in a boat to stage a publicity stunt by appearing to be stranded. They discover a mysterious galleon shrouded in mist and board it. One of the models' roommates, a fellow model who has a lesbian crush on her friend confronts the owner of the modeling agency, who hired them out to her friend; a wealthy and unscrupulous businessman behind the publicity stunt. The roommate is taken hostage when she discovers that her friend has gone missing and is raped by one of the businessman's henchmen. The businessman and the head of the modeling agency recruit an eccentric scholar to assist them in their search for the missing models and their boat, taking the roommate with them as they can not allow her to reveal the truth about the incident to the public.

The phantom galleon carries the coffins of the Knights Templar, eyeless mummies who hunt humans by sound. The two models are killed before the rescue party arrives. The rescue party also board the galleon, then discover their ship has vanished. The abducted girl is captured and dragged into the depths of the ship to be dismembered and eaten, while the rest of the group is locked in an unnatural sleep. The survivors struggle to repel and combat the spectral knights with what little knowledge they have of them.

== Cast ==
- Maria Perschy as Lillian
- Jack Taylor as Howard Tucker
- Bárbara Rey as Noemi
- Carlos Lemos as Professor Grüber
- Manuel de Blas as Sergio
- Blanca Estrada as Kathy
- Margarita Merino as Lorena Kay (uncredited)

== Release ==
The film has been released multiple times on DVD over the years. It was first released on DVD on December 3, 2002 by BCI. Blue Underground later released a limited-edition version on September 27, 2005; Anchor Bay Entertainment released another version of the film later that same year. The film was last released on DVD by Desert Island Films on August 1, 2012.

== Reception ==
TV Guide awarded the film 1 out of 4 stars, criticizing the pacing of the first hour of the film as being too slow, yet praised the film's atmosphere and ending. Writing in The Zombie Movie Encyclopedia, academic Peter Dendle said that "although the essential ingredients of de Ossorio's tried recipe are present, ... here they aren't as well exploited as the first two movies". Glenn Kay, who wrote Zombie Movies: The Ultimate Guide, called it the worst of the series. Reviewing the Blue Underground DVD, Adam Tyner wrote, "The Ghost Galleon is still a drastic improvement over The Return of the Evil Dead, and deeply flawed though it may be, the movie holds some sort of bizarre, inexplicable charm".
