= The Night of the Witches =

Night of the Sorcerers
- Directed by: Amando de Ossorio
- Written by: Amando de Ossorio
- Produced by: Luis Laso; Ricardo Muñoz Suay
- Starring: María Kosti
- Cinematography: Francisco Sánchez
- Edited by: Antonio Ramírez de Loaysa
- Music by: Fernando García Morcillo
- Release date: 1974
- Running time: 94 mins
- Country: Spain
- Language: Spanish (dubbed into English)

The Night of the Witches aka Night of the Sorcerers (Spanish: La Noche de los Brujos) is a 1974 horror film which starred Maria Kosti, Loli Tovar aka Maria Dolores del Loreto Tovar, Barbara King, Kali Hansa aka Marisol Hernandez, Jack Taylor, Simón Andreu, and Joseph Thelman. Written and directed by Amando de Ossorio, the premise of the movie is that a group of African explorers run afoul of a native cult. "Brujo" means a "male witch or warlock", so the title actually translates as "Night of the Warlocks", not "Night of the Witches".

== Plot ==
In a 1910 prologue, an unnamed missionary (Barbara King) is kidnapped by native bokor (sorcerers) to be sacrificed under a full moon. The bokor tie her between two posts, whip her, then carry her to a stone altar where they decapitate her. The ceremony is interrupted, however, by soldiers who shoot all the participants. Unnoticed in the melee, a shedim (demon) takes possession of the woman.

Years later, Professor Jonathan Grant (Jack Taylor) commands a safari investigating the disappearance of elephants in West Africa. Amongst the explorers are a "great white hunter," Rod Carter (Simón Andreu), two blonde women (Elisabeth, Maria Kosti, and Carol, Loli Tovar), and a mulatto woman, Tunika (Kali Hansa). Elizabeth's father financed the expedition. They stumble across the clearing where the natives had performed their Vodoun rituals before being wiped out in colonial times. Carol decides to take some photographs of the altar for a magazine article. They decide to camp nearby.

That night, Carol returns to the clearing to take some more atmospheric photographs. The former missionary, now dressed in leopard skins and with feline-like canine teeth/fangs, emerges from the surrounding jungle and subdues her. The long-dead Bokor, resurrected from their burial mounds, recreate the ceremony from the prologue. Carol is whipped and decapitated.

The remaining Europeans search for Carol the next day, but discover only her camera. That night, Carol, now also dressed in leopard skins, joins the other leopard-woman. Together, they sneak into the camp. The brunette kills Professor Grant and destroys the photographs from Carol's camera which he had been developing. The distraught Liz had taken sleeping pills when no one could locate her friend, and is groggy when Carol appears in her tent. "Elizabeth, it's me, your best friend Carol." "We thought you'd been lost in the jungle..." "It's just as well. Come!" The two blondes leave the camp and join the other leopard-woman in the jungle. Just as Liz realizes what they are going to do, the two leopard-women plunge their fangs into her neck. In Liz's struggles, the original leopard-woman is knocked down and the choker she wears to fasten her neck together splits. Her severed head rolls free and she perishes as blood gushes from her neck.

After another fruitless day of searching, Rod and Tunika make plans to depart. That night Carol is joined by the demon-possessed Elizabeth, also dressed in leopard skins, her new fangs gleaming in the moonlight. They abduct Tunika, take her to the ceremonial clearing, place her on the altar, and use their sharp fingernails and fangs to bloody her. As they place the leopard skins across her shredded flesh, Rod emerges from the jungle and shoots them both. He tosses his ammunition belts into the ceremonial fire, and the random shots kill the resurrected Bokor. In the confusion, he picks up Tunika and carries her to a jeep. They make their escape, and Tunika tells him she’s "feeling much better already" in the breathy voice of the Shedim.

== Release ==
The film was titled Night of the Sorcerers when it was dubbed into English and released theatrically by Avco-Embassy in 1974.

The film was released on VHS in the United States by Unicorn Video in the 1980s.

The film was released on a special edition DVD in 2007 by Deimos Entertainment, a subdivision of BCI Eclipse.
