= Canadian Wilderness =

1965 film by Amando de Ossorio

- Italian: I tre del Colorado
- Directed by: Amando de Ossorio
- Written by: Bob Sirens
- Screenplay by: Amando de Ossorio; Jesús Navarro Carrión; H.S. Valdés
- Story by: Amando de Ossorio
- Produced by: Enzo Alabiso; Maria Rosaria Grimaldi; Marius Lesoeur; José López Brea
- Cinematography: Fausto Zuccoli; Fulvio Testi
- Edited by: Antonio Gimeno
- Music by: Carlo Savina
- Production companies: Coperfilm; Produzioni Europee Associati
- Distributed by: Brepi Films; Ceres-Filmverleih; Embassy Pictures; Magic Video II
- Release date: 12 November 1965 (Italy)
- Running time: 99 min
- Countries: Spain; Italy

Canadian Wilderness (Italian: I tre del Colorado/ Three From Colorado) is a 1965 Spanish-Italian adventure drama western film directed by Amando de Ossorio. It stars George Martin and Luis Marín. The film was also known as Rebels in Canada.

== Plot ==
Hudson river fur hunters rebel against their English masters. Victor, having joined the rebels, kidnaps Ann from the ruthless Hudson Bay agent, Sullivan, as a bartering tool while the rebels seek to disrupt and gain control of the company's business.

== Cast ==
- George Martin as Victor DeFrois
- Diana Lorys as Nela, the Saloon Girl
- Giulia Rubini as Ann Sullivan
- Pamela Tudor as Swa / Muia, Linoux's Companion
- Luis Marín as Vincent / Craft, Sullivan's Employee
- Franco Fantasia as Leo Limoux
- Rafael Hernández as Gaston, Sullivan's Employee
- Mirko Ellis as Capitan Robert Doyle
- Simón Arriaga as Walter, Bearded Gold Panner
- Ralph Baldwyn as Victor's Friend
- Francisco Nieto as Jacob, Gold Panner
- Giovanni Petti as Milton, Sullivan's Employee
- José Bastida as Marcel Sardu, a Man from Colorado
- Aurelia Treviño as Ann's Maid
- Pedro Fenollar as Charles DeFrois, a Man from Colorado
- Maria del Carmen de la Torre as Doncella
- Albert Lockwood as Captain Farrell
- José Luis Lluch as Fur Trapper
- Guillermo Méndez as Farrell, Sullivan's Employee
- Joaquín Parra as Sullivan's Employee
- Elissa Pichelli as Washerwoman at the River (as Lisa Wagner)
- Rafael Calvo Revilla as Milton, Sullivan's Employee
- Benjamín Domingo as Leo Limoux
- Paul Ellis as Maurice Touret, a Man from Colorado
- Mari Ángeles Herranz as Ann Sullivan
- Josefina de Luna as Swa / Muia, Linoux's Companion
- Julio Pimentel as Sullivan's Employee
- Santiago Rivero as James Sullivan
- Claudio Rodríguez as Victor DeFrois
- Ana Maria Salazar as Nela, the Saloon Girl
- José Sancho
- Manuel Torremocha as Jacob, Gold Panner
