= María Kosti =

Spanish actress

- Born: María Soledad Mesa Pachón; April 29, 1951 (age 75); Madrid, Spain
- Other names: Maria Kosti; Maria Kosty
- Occupation: Actress
- Years active: 1966–present

María Kosti (born 29 April 1951) is a Spanish actress. She has starred in many Spanish television series and horror films.

== Early life and career ==
María was born María Soledad Mesa Pashón in Madrid, Spain. Her acting career began in 1966, in which she began acting in television. She appeared on the Spanish television series Escala en hi-fi, a reality music show in which unknown actors would chat about their opinions of the hits of the day. Not long after, she made her film debut in 1967 with Dos mil dólares por Coyote. María has appeared in several television series including Hora once, Compañera te doy, Novela, and Estudion 1. María has also appeared in many films throughout her acting career, notably horror films including El perfil de Satanás (Satan's Profile), La endemonaida (The Demonic), Exorcismo, and La noche de las gaviotas (Night of the Seagulls), the fourth and final film in the Blind Dead series.

== Filmography ==
Film
Year	Title	Role	Notes
1967	Dos mil dólares por Coyote		
1968	El paseíllo		
1969	El perfil de Satanás		other title - Satan's Profile
1969	Soltera y madre en la vida		other titles - A Single Mother in the Life, Unmarried and Mother in Life
1971	Si Fulano fuese Mengano		credited as Maria Kosty
1971	Hay que educar a papá		
1971	Las ibéricas F.C.	Tere	other title - The Iberian FC
1972	Venta por pisos	Carlota	
1972	Secuestro a la española		
1972	En un mundo nuevo	Carmela	
1972	La casa de la Chivas	Trini	
1973	La noche de los Brujos	Liz	other title - The Night of the Sorcerers
1973	La saga de los Drácula	Xenia	other title - The Dracula Saga
1973	Disco Rojo		
1973	La Rebelión de la muertas	Elsie	other titles - The Rise of the Dead, Vengeance of the Zombies. credited as Maria Kosti
1974	Una libélula para cada muerto	Ingrid	other title - A Dragonfly for Each Corpse
1974	Los mil ojos del asesino		
1974	El calzonazos	Regina	
1974	Novela	Anna	1973–1974; 2 episodes - De la piel del diablo, Selma Lagerlöf
1974	Las obsesiones de Armando		
1974	The New Spaniards	Julita	
1975	Terpia al desnudo		
1975	Ligeramente Viudas		
1975	La noche de las gaviotas	Joan Stein	other title - Night of the Seagulls
1975	La endemoniada	Esther	other title - The Demonic
1975	Exorcismo	Deborah	
1977	Doña Perfecta		
1979	La Familia, bien, gracias	Sabina	credited as Maria Kosty
1980	Cariñosamente infiel		
1980	El divorcio que viene	Merche	
1981	¿Dónde estará mi niño?	Diana	
1981	Last Harem	The Greek	
1981	Rocky Carambola	Madre en el parque	credited as Maria Kosti
1982	La tía de carlos	Ana	
1982	Las trampas del matrimonio		credited as Maria Kosty
1982	Las chicas del bingo		
1982	Cristóbal Colón, de oficio... descubridor	Felipa	
1983	Inseminación artificial		
1984	Mon ami Washington		other title - My Friend Washington
1985	Sangre en el Caribe		
1985	A la pálida luz de la luna		credited as Maria Kosty
1985	Una y sonada...	Llini	
1992	Memoria en la piel		short
1995	Filicidades Tovarich	Cristina	
1996	El intruso	Ángela	short
2001	Sueños el la mitad del mundo		other title - Dreams from the middle of the World
2002	El florido pensil	Doña Carmen	
2004	Tiovivo c. 1950	Julia	
2004	Laura		short
2008	Sangre de mayo	Doña Pepita	
2008	Las tierras altas		
Television
Year	Title	Role	Notes
1966	Escala en hi-fi	Herself	
1968	Flash 12	Herself	documentary short
1973	Hora once		1 episode - El delincuente honrado
1973	Compañera te doy		1 episode - El motivo
1974	La cometa naranja		
1974	Novela	Anna	2 episodes - De la piel del diablo, Selma Lagerlöf
1975	Este señor de negro	Elena	1 episode - Eternos rivales
1979	Antología de la zarzuela		
1979	Los mitos		1 episode
1980	Ding-Dong	Herself - Host	
1981	Ficciones		1 episode - El rumor
1983	Estudio 1	Hermina/Malvaloca/Rosita	7 episodes
1983	Anillos de oro	María Lázaro	1 episode - Una hermosa fachada
1989	Primera función		1 episode - Malvaloca
1990	J.M. presenta	Herself	1 episode
1990	Domingo en rojo	Herself	1 episode
1990	Waku waku	Herself	1 episode
1991	Haute tension		1 episode - Adriana
1993	Noches de gala		1 episode
1994	Encantada de la vida		2 episodes
1995	Farmacia de guarida		1 episode - Lo tuyo es puro teatro
1997	Éste es mi barrio		1996-1997; 5 episodes
1997	Don Juan	Estefanía	1 episode - Episode #1.1
2001	Manos a la obra		2 episodes - Benito y medium, La jaula
2001	El secreto	Adela Santiesteban/Adelita	2 episodes - Episode #2.1, Episode #2.66
2002	Paraíso	Sandra	2000-2002; 2 episodes - Las cenizas de Lourdes, Secuestradas
2003	Jimanji kanana	Herself	1 episode
2003	Pasapalabra	Herself	2002-2003; 9 episodes
2008	Cine de barrio	Herself	2006-2008; 2 episodes
2008	Planta 25	Olga/Silvia	2007-2008; 7 episodes
2008	Lalola	Carol	39 episodes
