= Lone Fleming =

Danish actress (born 1945)

Lone Fleming (born Lone Faerch; 5 September 1945, in Aarhus) is a Danish actress who has appeared in over 40 films, many of them in Spanish.

== Career ==
Fleming's film career began in the early 1970s in Spanish genre films, especially horror movies, erotic dramas and some Westerns. Her most famous film is probably the 1972 Tombs of the Blind Dead. Following her marriage to film director Eugenio Martín, she moved in 1978 back from the film business.

After four films in 1983/1984 she did not return to the screen until age 70.

In 2014, she received an Algeciras Fantástika award in recognition of her work in horror movies.

== Filmography ==
- 1970: Growing Leg, Diminishing Skirt
- 1971: Bad Man's River
- 1971: Tombs of the Blind Dead (La noche del terror Ciego)
- 1972: Pancho Villa
- 1973: Sexy Cat
- 1973: A Candle for the Devil (Una vela para el diablo) (aka It Happened at Nightmare Inn)
- 1973: Return of the Blind Dead (El ataque de los muertos sin ojos)
- 1975: Evil Eye (Malocchio)
- 1975: The Possessed (La endemoniada)
- 1976: Corals Girls (La ragazza dalla pelle di corallo)
- 1977: Where Time Began
- 1984: El último kamikaze
- 2014: La mujer que hablaba con los muertos
