= The Cantabrians =

- Spanish theatrical release poster
- Directed by: Paul Naschy (as "Jacinto Molina")
- Screenplay by: Paul Naschy (as "Jacinto Molina")
- Based on: The events of the Cantabrian Wars
- Produced by: José Monge
- Starring: Paul Naschy; Joaquín Gómez (as "Daniel Barry"); Julia Saly; Frank Brana; Verónica Miriel
- Cinematography: Alejandro Ulloa
- Edited by: Pedro del Rey
- Music by: Ángel Arteaga
- Release date: 1980
- Running time: 107 minutes
- Country: Spain
- Language: Spanish

The Cantabrians (Spanish: Los Cántabros) is a 1980 sword and sandal film about the Cantabrian Wars, starring and directed by Paul Naschy. The film describes the conflict between Cantabrian guerrilla leader Corocotta and Roman general Marcus Agrippa.

== Cast ==
- Paul Naschy as Marcus Vipsanius Agrippa
- Daniel Barry as Corocotta
- Verónica Miriel as Elia, Corocotta's sister
- Alfredo Mayo as Lábaro, a Druid
- Julia Saly as Selenia, a seer
- Blanca Estrada as Turenia, Corocotta's wife
- Andrés Resino as Augustus Caesar
- Antonio Iranzo as Sonanso, Cantabrian traitor
- Ricardo Palacios as Gurco, adopted Cantabrian warrior
- Pepe Ruiz as Hurón, adopted Cantabrian warrior
- Paloma Hurtado as Calpurnia
- Frank Braña as Próculo
- Mariano Vidal Molina as Salvio

== Plot ==
A voice-over describes how the Cantabrian tribes led by Corocotta have repeatedly defeated the Roman attempts to annex their territory in Spain. In Rome, Augustus is furious. His general Agrippa proposes a new plan - to defeat the Canabrians by adopting their own guerrilla tactics. Meanwhile, in Spain, Corocotta attacks what he thinks is a Roman gold-transport, only to find rocks. He frees the slaves, who join his forces. Selenia, a seer, warns Corocotta of danger, but also tells Corocotta that his wife has given birth to a son. While Corocotta sees his wife and new child, Agrippa meets with Sonanso, a Cantabrian traitor who agrees to help him.

Aided by the traitor, Agrippa ambushes and defeats part of Corocotta's force. Selenia gives Corocotta a drug, and he dreams that to fight Agrippa is to fight Death himself. However, supported by the druid Lábaro, he refuses to give in. In the next battle Corocotta takes Agrippa's men by surprise, badly mauling the Romans. Agrippa is furious and discovers that his Cantabrian mistress has been informing Corocotta about Roman troop movements. Realising that the Canatbrian spirit of the resistance will not easily be broken, Agrippa decides to adopt more ruthless tactics, telling his men to take no prisoners, including the women and children. Corocotta is ambushed and badly wounded, but escapes. Lábaro and Selenia say that Agrippa must be stopped. Elia, Corocotta's sister, resolves to kill Agrippa using a sacred knife given her by Selenia. She sneaks into his tent and tries to stab him, but after a hard struggle with Agrippa, she is seriously wounded by an arrow shot by a guard. Agrippa is struck by her beauty and spirit. He nurses her back to health and falls in love with her. The two become lovers.

Agrippa gives Elia a letter to take to Corocotta offering peace terms. Sonasso denounces her as a traitor, whipping up a crowd to stone her. Corocotta intervenes and kills Sonasso. Agrippa discusses the situation with Augustus, who agrees to offer a large reward for the capture of Corocotta. Corocotta himself then appears before Augustus, offering himself in exchange for the freedom of his people. Augustus is impressed by his bravery and lets him go. Selenia tells Agrippa that he must resolve things in a personal combat between himself and Corocotta. In the fight, Corocotta defeats Agrippa, who agrees to leave his people alone, for the moment. Corocotta leaves with his family and followers, taking the reward.

== Production and reception ==
Naschy took this project over from Spanish horror film director Amando de Ossorio, who had originally been hired to direct it; Naschy totally rewrote the screenplay and recast the film. Appearing under his assumed name as lead actor, he used his real name, Jacinto Molina, as director and screenwriter. The film "failed miserably at the box office".
