= Tombs of the Blind Dead =

1972 Spanish-Portuguese horror film

- Original Spanish film poster
- Directed by: Amando de Ossorio
- Written by: Amando de Ossorio
- Produced by: José Antonio Pérez Giner; Salvadore Romero
- Starring: Lone Fleming; César Burner
- Cinematography: Pablo Ripoll
- Edited by: José Antonio Rojo
- Music by: Antón García Abril
- Distributed by: Hispamex
- Release date: April 10, 1972
- Running time: 101 minutes
- Countries: Spain; Portugal
- Language: Spanish

Tombs of the Blind Dead (also presented as Revenge From Planet Ape) is a 1972 Spanish-Portuguese horror film written and directed by Amando de Ossorio. Its original Spanish title is La noche del terror ciego (lit. English: The Night of the Blind Terror).

The film was the first in Ossorio's "Blind Dead" series, spawning three official sequels: Return of the Blind Dead (1973), The Ghost Galleon (1974) and Night of the Seagulls (1975). Its success helped kickstart the Spanish horror film boom of the early 1970s.

Ossorio has stated that Gustavo Adolfo Bécquer's Gothic horror legend El monte de las ánimas (1862) and George A. Romero's Night of the Living Dead (1968) both influenced the creation of his film.

== Plot ==
Legend has it that in the abandoned medieval town of Berzano, at the border between Spain and Portugal, the Knights Templar (a fictionalized version of the real-life order that was dissolved in the 14th century following charges of witchcraft and heresy) leave their tombs at night and come back from the dead as revenants. The reanimated corpses are blind, because their eyes were pecked out by birds while their hanged bodies rotted on the gallows.

While on vacation nearby with her friend Roger Whelan, Virginia White reconnects with her dear college friend Betty "Bet" Turner, who relocated in the area and now runs a mannequin factory. Roger immediately takes a liking to Betty and invites her along for a train journey, provoking Virginia's jealousy, as the two women had a romantic relationship years prior. Angry at both, Virginia jumps off the train. Wandering through the country, she comes upon the ruins of Berzano, where she decides to camp overnight. The knights rise from their tombs and attack her, ultimately biting and ripping her flesh. Her corpse is found in a field the following morning by the returning train conductor.

The next morning, Betty and Roger retrace Virginia's steps, trying to find out what happened to her. They hear about the legend from some locals and meet two police investigators who inform them about Virginia's horrible fate. Later at the morgue, next to Betty's laboratory, Virginia's corpse comes back to life and kills a custodian, then flees to the lab and is only stopped by Betty's assistant, who manages to set Virginia on fire inside the mannequin factory.

In the meantime, Betty and Roger are investigating the legend with the help of Professor Pedro Candal, who indirectly send them to find his son Pedro, who lives near Berzano as a small-time smuggler and is suspected by the police to be the one who killed Virginia as a way to instill fear in the locals. Once they have located Pedro and convinced him to help them prove the knights are real, Betty and Roger return with Pedro and his lover Maria to Berzano, to confront the knights once and for all.

Upon their arrival, they are confronted by the knights, who kill Roger, Pedro and Maria. The knights find Betty through her heartbeat, and she flees from Berzano with the knights in pursuit. She boards a passing train, hiding in a cargo of coal. The knights take charge of the train, killing the conductor and cannibalizing passengers on board. The train arrives at the station shortly thereafter, and Betty, speechless, is helped by a station attendant. As several passengers go to board the train, they scream in horror at the sight inside.

== Cast ==
- Lone Fleming as Betty Turner
- César Burner as Roger Whelan
- María Elena Arpón as Virginia White
- José Thelman as Pedro Candal
- Rufino Inglés as Inspector Oliveira
- Verónica Llimera as Nina
- Simón Arriaga as Morgue Keeper
- Francisco Sanz as Professor Candal
- Juan Cortés as Coroner
- Andrés Isbert as Train Engineer's Son
- Antonio Orengo as Train Engineer
- José Camoiras as Victims
- María Silva as Maria
- Carmen Yazalde as Sacrificed Maiden

== Production ==
Ossorio objected to the description of the revenant Templars as "zombies", insisting that they more resembled mummies who feed like vampires and that, unlike zombies, the Templars were not mindless corpses.

Exterior scenes in the film were shot in Portugal and Spain. In Portugal, locations included Lisbon and surrounding areas (Palmela, Setúbal, Sesimbra and Estoril). In Spain, film credits mention the monastery at El Cercón, Madrid, but the scenes with the impressive sinister ruins were filmed at the Santa María la Real de Valdeiglesias monastery in Pelayos de la Presa.

== Edited Versions ==
The film was originally released in the United States in 1973 as "The Blind Dead." Hallmark Releasing advertised it as rated "V" for violence, as they did with "Mark of the Devil" one year earlier. As with that film, "stomach distress bags" were offered to patrons coming to see "The Blind Dead." The film was very successful.

The Spanish version, La noche del terror ciego, differed from the retitled English version. In the latter, a flashback of the living Knights Templar torturing and drinking the blood of a female victim was moved to the beginning of the film, and most of the sex and gore (for instance, the scene depicting the lesbian relationship between Betty and Virginia, a scene in which Pedro rapes Betty and the sequence on a train in which the Knights kill a woman in front of her child) were removed.

Later, American distributors decided to severely re-edit the film for an English-language re-release and add a new opening scene to cash in on the success of the Planet of the Apes film series. The plan was to replace the film's original setting with a post-apocalyptic future in which the undead were deceased intelligent apes, similar to the ones seen in Planet of the Apes. Rather than reshooting, location footage from the film was edited together, the Templar flashback sequence was removed, and a narration track explaining the premise was produced as an introduction. The revised film was retitled Revenge from Planet Ape. Apparently first released in 1976, this version played at various theaters in the United States and even Guam between 1976 and 1984.

== Re-release ==
Elite Entertainment released the Uncensored Widescreen Director's Cut as an Extended Play Laserdisc on March 12, 1997. It features the original uncut Spanish version, in Spanish with English subtitles. The film begins with a computer-generated title dedicating the film to the memory of Armando de Ossorio; the title was however an error, as the distributors thought that de Ossorio was dead at the time of the release, but he actually died in 2001.

The film was released on DVD on 20 October 1998 by Anchor Bay Entertainment as a double feature with Return of the Blind Dead. This was released on DVD on 17 November 2002 by Shriek Show as from a double feature with Return of the Blind Dead. It was released again on DVD on 27 September 2005 as a five-disc limited edition by Blue Underground featuring the film and its three sequels; the DVD of the film in this release contained both the original Spanish version (subtitled but not dubbed) and the Revenge from Planet Ape opening sequence. It was reissued again by Blue Underground on 26 September 2006 as a stand-alone release.

On 1 July 2016, the film was again reissued in a four-disc set by Blue Underground featuring the film and its three sequels.

In 2022, Synapse Films released the film on DVD, and for the first time on Blu-ray, containing new restorations of both the Spanish and US versions.

== Reception ==
Writing in The Zombie Movie Encyclopedia, academic Peter Dendle said, "Spanish filmmaker de Ossorio earned international fame with this widely popular tale of blind zombie monks, creating a fresh mythology and unforgettable zombies, all set against imposing scenic backgrounds". Allmovie gave the film a positive review, praising the film's make-up effects, chilling atmosphere, and soundtrack. TV Guide awarded the film two out of four stars and called it "a slow and lackadaisically plotted thirsty-corpse movie distinguished by terrific music and locations, and genuinely eerie zombies". Brett H. from Oh the Horror! gave the film a positive review, stating, "Tombs of the Blind Dead is a slow moving Spanish classic that is a must see for all fans of creature features with ample amounts of all the things that make horror great. It's not perfect and it does have some small inconsistencies (why in the world are the Templars so powerful, yet sometimes swing their swords like goofy puppets?), but you'll be too engulfed in the atmosphere and monsters to worry too much about it".

Jeremy Zoss from Film Threat gave the film a negative review, stating, "Like many old works of entertainment from Mexico, Tombs of the Blind Dead is not without its charms. It would be a great film to watch while drunk with a group of friends. However, when looking for a real horror film, the Blind Dead are definitely not worth seeing". Film critic John Kenneth Muir gave the film a mostly positive review, writing that the film lost momentum after the first act but praised the film's suspense, unsettling imagery and the effectiveness of the Templar revenants as "genuinely scary". Adam Tyner of DVD Talk wrote, "Although Tombs of the Blind Dead isn't a particularly gory film, several of its sequences are deeply unsettling".

The film has an approval rating of 75% on film review aggregate Rotten Tomatoes and an average rating of 5.9 out of 10 based on seven reviews.

== Legacy ==
The Blind Dead (Knights Templar) villains were unofficially resurrected in the 1975 entry La cruz del diablo, directed by John Gilling.

The film was an influence on Mansion of the Living Dead, a 1982 film directed by Jesús Franco.

More recently, the Templar appeared in the unofficial, shot-on-video sequel Graveyard of the Dead, also known as El retorno de los templarios (2009). and in supporting roles in Don't Wake the Dead (2008) and Unrated: The Movie (2009), two films by German director Andreas Schnaas.

The short comic story "Ascension of the Blind Dead" appeared in the 2010 Asylum Press graphic novel Zombie Terrors Volume 1, written by David Zuzelo with artwork by William Skaar.

In 2015, Emma Dark and Merlyn Roberts co-directed an unofficial short film sequel in the form of a fake film trailer for a non-existing fifth Blind Dead movie, Island of the Blind Dead.

The film has also been an inspiration to metal bands worldwide with over 50 bands having songs titled tombs of the blind dead or some other iteration, all of which pay tribute to the movie series.

In 2021, Curse of the Blind Dead from director Raffaele Ricchio was released. The film was poorly received.

Full Moon Features released director Chris Alexander’s Scream of the Blind Dead in 2021. The film is said to be an impressionistic variation on the first half hour of Tombs of the Blind Dead, this time with a female blind knight. Original star Lone Fleming provided the voice over narration. It has received some critical acclaim, with Film Threat calling it “a gorgeous art piece that has much to offer the nightmare choir.”

In 2020 publisher St. Rooster Books released an anthology of stories based on the Blind Dead Series entitled "The Blind Dead Ride Out of Hell"
