= Ángel del Pozo =

Spanish actor (1934–2025)

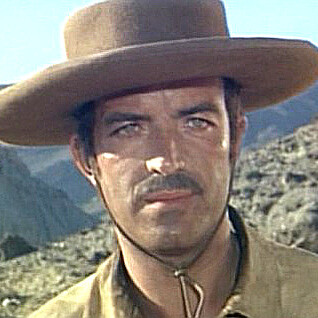
- del Pozo in The Big Gundown (1966)
- Born: Ángel del Pozo Merino; 14 July 1934; Madrid, Spain
- Died: 29 March 2025 (aged 90)
- Occupation: Actor
- Years active: 1960–1980

Ángel del Pozo Merino (14 July 1934 – 29 March 2025) was a Spanish actor who appeared in more than seventy films since 1960. His daughter is the journalist Almudena del Pozo.

Pozo retired in 1980, and from 1990 to 2008, he worked as an executive producer and public relations on Gestevisión Group, from Mediaset España Comunicación.

In April 2020, he survived COVID-19. On 11 October 2020, he received Tabernas de Cine Award on Almería Western Film Festival in Mini Hollywood and Fort Bravo. Pozo died on 29 March 2025, at the age of 90.

== Biography ==
He combined his university studies with amateur performances at the T.E.U. until he finally decided to pursue acting professionally. He joined Lili Muráti company, participating in the comedy Un bruto para Patricia.

He made his film debut in 1960 with the adaptation of the aforementioned play. After playing leading men in films such as My Love Is Called Margarita (1961), Vuelve San Valentín (1962), and Escala en hi-fi (1963), he specialized in the genre known as Spaghetti Western, shooting more than thirty films in the 1960s and 1970s. He shared the screen with stars such as Lee Van Cleef, Christopher Lee, Jean Rochefort, Yul Brynner, and Orson Welles.

== Filmography ==
Year	Title	Role	Notes
1960	My Street		
1965	The Dictator's Guns		
1966	The Big Gundown	Chet Miller	
1966	Savage Pampas	Lieutenant Del Rio	
1966	For a Few Extra Dollars	Captain Lefevre	
1967	The Glass Sphinx	Alex	
1967	Face to Face	Maximilian de Winton	
1968	Wrath of God	David	
1969	Simón Bolívar		
1969	Bridge Over the Elbe	Rod	
1970	La banda de los tres crisantemos	Police Agent John Williams	
1971	Catlow	Vargas	
1972	Horror Express	Yevtushenko	
1972	Pancho Villa	Lieutenant Eager	
1972	Treasure Island	Dr. Livesey	
1973	The Man Called Noon	Ben Janish	
1973	The Three Musketeers	Jussac	
1974	The Four Musketeers	Jussac	
1975	Mistress of the Devil	Chaplain	
1975	The Passenger	Police Inspector	
