= Spoiled Children (1980 film) =

- Theatrical film poster
- Spanish: Hijos de papá
- Directed by: Rafael Gil
- Written by: Fernando Vizcaíno Casas (novel)
- Starring: Irene Gutiérrez Caba; José Bódalo; Antonio Garisa
- Cinematography: José F. Aguayo
- Edited by: José Luis Matesanz
- Music by: Gregorio García Segura
- Release date: 18 December 1980
- Country: Spain
- Language: Spanish

Spoiled Children (Spanish: Hijos de papá) is a 1980 Spanish comedy film directed by Rafael Gil and starring Irene Gutiérrez Caba, José Bódalo and Antonio Garisa.

== Cast ==
- Irene Gutiérrez Caba as Amparo
- José Bódalo as Don Fabián de Luna (1978)
- Antonio Garisa as Don Melquiades
- Florinda Chico as Lola
- Fernando Sancho as Agustín
- Blanca Estrada as Alicia Ortega
- Agustín González as Leopoldo
- Alfonso del Real as Adalberto Alcubilla
- María Luisa Ponte as Eulalia
- Adrián Ortega as Narciso
- Yolanda Farr
- Antonio Casas
- José Nieto
- Ana Obregón as Amparito
- Valentín Gascón
- Antonio Vico as Fabián de Luna (1946)
- María Casal as Mari Nieves
- Manuel de Benito
- Rafael Hernández as guard
- Pepe Ruiz as witness
- Carmen Lozano as Diana
- Mabel Escaño
- Alejandro de Enciso
- Ricardo Palacios as lawyer
- Taida Urruzola as Núria
- Emilio Rodríguez
- Lola Lemos as Doña Leonor
- Maite Pardo
- Alejandra Grepi as María Antonia
- Alfredo Cernuda
- Charo Moreno
- Rafael Machado as Enrique
- Kako Larrañaga
- Ramón Lillo
- Bebe Palmer as Vedette
- Fernando Vizcaíno Casas as magistrate
