= Bad Man's River =

1971 film by Eugenio Martín

- Directed by: Eugenio Martín
- Written by: Eugenio Martín Philip Yordan
- Produced by: Bernard Gordon
- Starring: Lee Van Cleef; James Mason; Gina Lollobrigida; Simón Andreu; Diana Lorys; Aldo Sambrell; Eduardo Fajardo; Sergio Fantoni
- Cinematography: Alejandro Ulloa
- Music by: Waldo de los Rios
- Release date: 1971
- Running time: 90 minutes
- Countries: Spain; France; Italy
- Language: English

Bad Man's River (Italian: E continuavano a fregarsi il milione di dollari and Spanish: El hombre de Río Malo) is a 1971 Italian/Spanish/French international co-production comedy Spaghetti Western directed by Eugenio Martín and starring Lee Van Cleef, James Mason, Gina Lollobrigida, Sergio Fantoni, Simón Andreu and Lone Fleming, the director's then wife. Soundtrack was composed by Tony Duhig, Jon Field, Glyn Havard and Waldo de los Ríos.

== Plot ==
Roy King's gang robs a bank and flees to Mexico on a train. Roy meets a beautiful woman, Alicia, and marries her, only to have her run off with all of the money.

An offer comes his way to blow up the arsenal of the Mexican army, then rob their representatives when they take money across the border to replace the destroyed weapons. A daring plan gets the job done, only to have Roy double-crossed once more, unable to get his money.

== Cast ==
- Lee Van Cleef as Roy King
- Gina Lollobrigida as Alicia King
- James Mason as Montero
- Simón Andreu: Angel Santos
- Gianni Garko: Ed Pace
- Diana Lorys: Dolores
- Sergio Fantoni: Colonel Enrique Fierro
- Aldo Sambrell: Canales
- Jess Hahn: Tom Odie
- Daniel Martín: Falso Montero
- Luis Rivera: Orozco
- Lone Fleming: Conchita
- Eduardo Fajardo: General Duarte
- José Manuel Martín: Mexican Soldier
