= Azucena Hernández =

Spanish actress (1960–2019)

- Born: Azucena Hernández Iglesias; March 21, 1960; Seville, Andalusia, Spain
- Died: December 4, 2019 (aged 59); Spain
- Occupation: Actress
- Known for: Being paralyzed following an automobile incident

Azucena Hernández Iglesias (21 March 1960 – 4 December 2019) was a Spanish actress known for her work in cinema, stage and television. Her artistic career began in the late 1970s and flourished during early years of the 1980s. Her career was cut short in 1986 by a debilitating car crash that left her paralyzed.

== Biography ==
Azucena was born in Seville, Andalusia. She was briefly active as a model, and on 3 August 1977 she was elected Miss Catalonia in the town of Agramunt.

She lived for some years in the municipality of Blanes, and later moved to Madrid starting her career as an actress in 1978 in an operetta and in the movie Las eróticas vacaciones de Stela, as well as some erotic productions of a subgenre known in Spain as S-Films which was very popular in the late 1970s. Azucena also played some roles in satirical films.

In 1980 she starred in the horror film El Retorno del Hombre Lobo, directed by Paul Naschy. This film was exported to several countries under the titles The Craving and The Night of the Werewolf which gave Azucena some fame abroad, popularity later revived through Internet forums.

In the early part of the 1980s, she continued as a stage actress, taking part in the play Enrique IV, a Spanish adaptation of Luigi Pirandello's Enrico IV original. She also appeared in several television broadcasts, working first in Anthology of Zarzuela by Fernando Garcia de la Vega, where she participated at some zarzuelas, Spanish kind of semi-operatic plays.

Her media career was prematurely ended by a serious car accident in Las Rozas de Madrid, on the night of 15 to 16 October 1986, in which she received severe spinal cord injuries.

After 1986, she made a few appearances on television about the adaptations she had to make as a result of her disability.
