= Horror Express =

1972 film by Eugenio Martín

- UK film poster
- Directed by: Eugenio Martín
- Screenplay by: Arnaud d'Usseau; Julian Zimet (as Julian Halevy)
- Story by: Eugenio Martín
- Produced by: Bernard Gordon
- Starring: Christopher Lee; Peter Cushing; Telly Savalas
- Cinematography: Alejandro Ulloa
- Edited by: Robert C. Dearberg
- Music by: John Cacavas
- Production companies: Granada Films; Benmar Productions; Scotia International
- Distributed by: Regia Films Arturo González (Spain); Gala Film Distributors (UK)
- Release dates: 30 September 1972 (Sitges); 10 January 1973 (Barcelona); 20 June 1974 (UK)
- Running time: 90 minutes
- Countries: Spain; United Kingdom
- Language: English
- Budget: $300,000
- Box office: 755,542 admissions (Spain)

Horror Express (Spanish: Pánico en el Transiberiano, lit. 'Panic on the Trans-Siberian') is a 1972 science-fiction horror film directed by Eugenio Martín, and starring Christopher Lee, Peter Cushing, and Telly Savalas; with Alberto de Mendoza, Silvia Tortosa, Julio Peña, George Rigaud, Ángel del Pozo, Helga Liné, and Alice Reinheart in supporting roles.

The film is set in the year 1906, and its storyline follows the various passengers aboard a European-bound Trans-Siberian Railway. They are soon stalked, one by one, by an alien intelligence inhabiting the frozen body of an ancient primitive humanoid brought onboard by an anthropologist.

A Spanish and British co-production, the film premiered at the 1972 Sitges Film Festival, where director Eugenio Martín received the Critics' Award – Bronze Medal for Best Screenplay. It has developed a cult following among horror film fans.

== Plot ==
In 1906, Professor Sir Alexander Saxton, a British anthropologist, is returning to Europe by the Trans-Siberian Express from Shanghai to Moscow. With him is a crate containing the frozen remains of a primitive humanoid that he discovered in a cave in Manchuria, which he hopes is a missing link in human evolution. Doctor Wells, Saxton's friendly rival and Geological Society colleague, is also waiting to board. Also waiting is Polish Count Marion Petrovski and his wife, Countess Irina. With the couple is their spiritual advisor, an Eastern Orthodox monk named Father Pujardov, who proclaims to Saxton that the contents of the crate are evil. Additional passengers include Inspector Mirov and a squad of soldiers.

Saxton’s eagerness to keep his scientific findings secret arouses the suspicion of Wells, who bribes a porter to investigate the crate. The porter is killed by the defrosted humanoid within, who escapes the crate after picking the lock and kills several more passengers. Wells performs an autopsy and deduces that the creature absorbs the skills and memories of its victims. When the humanoid is gunned down by Mirov, the threat seems to have been eliminated. Saxton and Wells discover that the real threat is a formless extra-terrestrial that inhabited the body of the humanoid. Unknown to them, the creature has transferred itself into Mirov.

The extra-terrestrial has been stranded on Earth for millions of years. It kills passengers with specific knowledge that could help it build a new spaceship. Eventually, Cossack Captain Kazan stabs and shoots Mirov. With Mirov dying, Pujardov, believing the creature to be Satan and having pledged allegiance to it prior, allows it to possess him. The passengers flee to the brake van while the alien murders Kazan, his men, and the Count. Saxton, having discovered the creature cannot use its powers when it is exposed to light, blinds it. The alien bargains with Saxton, tempting him with its advanced knowledge of technology and cures for diseases. When Saxton refuses, it resurrects all its victims as zombies, and has them attack Saxton.

Saxton and the countess fight their way through the train until they reach the van, where the other survivors have taken refuge. Saxton and Wells uncouple the van from the rest of the train containing the alien. Kazan's superiors send a telegram to a dispatch station ahead, instructing them to destroy the train by sending it down a siding overlooking a gorge. The survivors watch as the train crashes down the gorge and goes up in flames.

== Cast ==
- Christopher Lee as Professor Sir Alexander Saxton
- Peter Cushing as Dr. Wells
- Alberto de Mendoza as Father Pujardov
- Silvia Tortosa as Countess Irina Petrovski
- Julio Peña as Inspector Mirov
- Telly Savalas as Captain Kazan
- George Rigaud as Count Marion Petrovski
- Helga Liné as Natasha
- Alice Reinheart as Miss Jones
- Ángel del Pozo as Yevtushenko
- José Jaspe as Conductor Konev
- Víctor Israel as Baggage Man
- Faith Clift as Miss Bennett
- Juan Olaguivel as the Creature
- Barta Barri as Telegraphist
- Hiroshi Kitatawa as Grashinski
- Vicente Roca as Stationmaster
- José Canalejas as Russian Guard
- José Marco as Vorkin
- Allen Russell as Captain O'Hagan

== Production ==
=== Development ===
The film was co-produced by American screenwriter/producer Bernard Gordon, who had moved to Spain following the Hollywood blacklist. He had previously collaborated with Martin on the 1972 film Pancho Villa (which featured Savalas in the title role). Martin made Horror Express as part of a three-picture contract he had with Philip Yordan, and Savalas was under contract with Yordan as well. The film was a co-production between Spain's Granada Films and the British company Benmar Productions, who made Psychomania (1971).

According to Martin, the film was made because a producer obtained a train set from Nicholas and Alexandra (1971). "He came up with the idea of writing a script just so he would be able to use this prop," said Martin. "Now at that time, Phil was in the habit of buying up loads of short stories to adapt into screenplays, and the story for Horror Express was originally based on a tale written by a little-known American scriptwriter and playwright." The credited writers, Arnaud d'Usseau and Julian Zimet, were also American blacklistees who had relocated to Europe. They had previously written Pancho Villa and Psychomania for the producers.

Zimet was originally credited under the pseudonym Julian Halevy; the Writers Guild of America officially restored his screenplay credit on 29 September 1997.

Rumors that the train sets were acquired from the production of Doctor Zhivago (or Nicholas and Alexandra) were countered by Gordon, who said in a 2000 interview that the model had been constructed for the feature film Pancho Villa. Filmmakers used the mock-up from Pancho Villa as the interior for all train cars during production. Since no further room was available on stage, all scenes within each train car were shot consecutively. The set was then modified for the next car's scenes.

The film's story bears many similarities to the classic John W. Campbell novella Who Goes There? (better known as the source material for The Thing from Another World and its remake The Thing), though neither Campbell nor his story is credited on the actual film.

=== Filming ===
Horror Express was filmed in Madrid between 1971 and 1972. It was produced on a low budget of $300,000, with the luxury of having three familiar genre actors in the lead roles; filming began in December 1971.

Securing Lee and Cushing was a coup for Gordon, since it lent an atmosphere reminiscent of the horror Hammer Films, many of which starred both actors. When Cushing arrived in Madrid to begin work on the picture, he was still distraught over the recent death of his wife. He announced to Gordon that he could not do the film. With Gordon now desperate over the idea of losing one of his important stars, Lee stepped in and put Cushing at ease, simply by talking to his old friend about some of their previous work together; Cushing changed his mind and stayed on.

The train's departure scene was filmed in Madrid's Delicias railway station. The locomotive pulling the train in that scene is a RENFE 141F; later in the film, miniatures are utilized for the exterior shots of the train going by camera and for the film's climax.

Like all Italian and Spanish films of the period, Horror Express was filmed mostly without sound, with the effects and voices dubbed for the film in post-production; Lee, Cushing, and Savalas all provided their own voices for the English-speaking version.

=== Music ===
Horror Express features the debut film score of American musician John Cacavas, who would later gain prominence for scoring Telly Savalas' television series Kojak. Cacavas met Savalas while working in London in the early 1970s, the two became friends and Savalas helped him move into film and television scoring.

== Release ==
Under its original Spanish title Pánico en el Transiberiano, the film premiered as an official selection at the Sitges Film Festival on 30 September 1972. Eugenio Martín received the Critics' Award – Bronze Medal for Best Screenplay.

It was released in New York on 30 November 1973.

=== Home media ===
A special edition Blu-ray/DVD film release was issued in 2011 by Severin Films. Arrow Films released a new Blu-ray edition on 12 February 2019. The restoration used a 2K scan of the original 35 mm camera negative, supplemented by a 35 mm interpositive for the fifth reel, which was missing from the negative.

== Reception ==
=== Critical response ===
Horror Express generally received positive reviews. At the review aggregator website Rotten Tomatoes, the film has an 80% approval rating, with an average rating of 6.85 out of 10, based on 15 reviews.

Montgomery Advertiser film critic Jery Tillotson gave the film a positive review, writing, "Good performances, brisk direction, and fast action moves this thriller a notch above the average shocker".

According to Martín, Spain, his native country, was where the film fared the worst, both critically and for its low box office revenue. It was received positively in other film markets where the audience was more familiar with low-budget horror films; these included Great Britain, the United States, and Australia. "I was a bit surprised myself at the film's popularity overseas, but it didn’t really do a great deal for my subsequent career", said Martin.

Film critic Anton Bitel has compared Horror Express to John W. Campbell's 1938 novella Who Goes There?, noting similarities in their portrayal of an extraterrestrial entity capable of moving between hosts.

== In popular culture ==
The film was used as a "virtual reality" experience for the 2021 television show Creepshow (season 2, episode 5: "Night of the Living Late Show"). In that episode, the film is the favourite of inventor Simon Sherman (portrayed by Justin Long), who had it placed as one of the interactive features in his virtual reality invention called the Immersopod. While archive footage of Christopher Lee and Peter Cushing is used in the episode, Hannah Fierman portrays her rendition of Countess Irina Petrovsky, with whom Simon begins a relationship, since he has had a crush on her since he was a young boy.

== Sources ==
- Gifford, Denis (2016). The British Film Catalogue Volume 2: Non-Fiction Film, 1888-1994. London: Taylor & Francis. ISBN 978-1-317-83698-8.
- Gordon, Bernard (2013). Hollywood Exile, or How I Learned to Love the Blacklist. Austin, Texas: University of Texas Press. ISBN 978-0-292-75641-0.
- Hodges, Mike (September 1999). "Riding the Horror Express". Fangoria. No. 186. pp. 70–75. ISSN 0164-2111.
- Lukeman, Adam (2011). Anthony Timpone (ed.). Fangoria's 101 Best Horror Movies You've Never Seen: A Celebration of the World's Most Unheralded Fright Flicks. New York: Crown/Archetype. ISBN 978-0-307-52347-1.

=== Reviews ===
- "Horror Express" review by Brett Gallman at Oh, the Horror!
- "Horror Express (Blu-ray)" review by Adam Tyner at DVDTalk.com
- "Horror Express" review at Mondo-digital.com
- "Horror Express (1972) w/Julian Velard" review by RNGHPN9
