= Malenka =

- Spanish film poster
- Directed by: Amando de Ossorio
- Screenplay by: Amando de Ossorio
- Starring: Anita Ekberg; John Hamilton; Diana Lorys; Adriana Ambesi
- Cinematography: Fulvio Testi
- Edited by: Antonio Jimeno
- Music by: Carlo Savina
- Production companies: Cobra Film Productions; Tritón P.C.; Victory Films
- Distributed by: Distribuiodria Cinematograficas Rosa Film (Spain); Indipendenti Regionali (Italy)
- Release date: 3 August 1969 (Spain)
- Running time: 96 minutes
- Countries: Spain; Italy

Malenka, the Vampire's Niece (also titled Fangs of the Living Dead) is a 1969 Italian/Spanish horror film that was written and directed by Spanish director Amando de Ossorio; it was his first horror film.

One of the first vampire films from Spain, it was inspired by similarly themed Italian and British vampire films that were being released during the same time period, such as Dance of the Vampires. It has been credited as being "the 1969 picture that hammered the final nail into the cinematic coffin of the bomb-shelter-era bombshell Anita Ekberg", as well as being "one of the most original gothic examples of Spanish horror".

== Plot ==
The beautiful and virginal Sylvia (Anita Ekberg) is delighted to discover that she's inherited not only the noble title of countess, but has also inherited a castle located in the country. She excitedly calls her fiance, Dr. Piero Luciani (Gianni Medici), to tell him that she's going to travel to view the castle. Once there, she stops at a local inn for a drink, where she announces her destination and relation to the castle's inhabitants; this horrifies the townspeople. Unswayed by their reactions, Sylvia arrives at the castle and meets her uncle, Count Walbrooke (Julián Ugarte), and beds down for the night. She is later awakened by the maidservant Blinka (Adriana Ambesi), who warns her that Walbrooke is a century-old vampire that means her harm. Blinka's attempts to draw Sylvia out of bed and out of the castle are interrupted by Walbrooke, who takes her into another room and whips her. Sylvia pleads with him to stop, only for Walbrooke to reveal that Blinka herself is also a vampire.

The next morning, Sylvia attempts to leave but is persuaded to stay after Walbrooke tells her about her aunt Malenka, who was burned at the stake for being a witch. He convinces Sylvia that the family is cursed, and that because of her strong resemblance to Malenka, paired with her ties to the family, Sylvia is also cursed. Furthermore, Sylvia must remain at the castle and stay unmarried, otherwise the curse will worsen and affect those around her. As a result, Sylvia breaks off her engagement with Piero, who decides to travel to the castle out of concern for Sylvia. When he arrives at the same inn that Sylvia visited earlier in the film, Piero is filled in on the events by Brugard (Juanita Ramírez), one of the inn's barmaids. Piero then travels to the castle, intending to stop Walbrooke from turning Sylvia into a vampire. He stabs Walbrooke with a stake through the heart.

In the original Spanish version of the film, the uncle's "vampire ploy" turns out to be a hoax he's using to drive his niece crazy. An alternative "supernatural" ending however was later filmed and added to the English-language version, in which the uncle actually disintegrates into a skeleton at the end, indicating that he really was a vampire and thereby contradicting the rest of the film.

== Cast ==
- Anita Ekberg as Malenka/Sylvia Morel
- Gianni Medici as Dr. Piero Luciani (as John Hamilton)
- Diana Lorys as Bertha Zemis
- Rosanna Yanni as Freya Zemis
- César Benet as Max (as Guy Roberts)
- Carlos Casaravilla as Dr. Horbinger
- Fernando Bilbao as Vladis the Coachman
- Paul Muller as Dr. Albert
- Adriana Santucci as The Count's Maid
- Aurelia Treviño as Village Woman
- Juanita Ramírez as Brugard the Barmaid
- Adriana Ambesi as Blinka (as Audrey Ambert)
- Julián Ugarte as Uncle/Count Walbrooke
- Keith Kendal as Man

== Production ==
Julián Ugarte played the vampire uncle, Count Walbrooke, fresh from his appearance as the vampire in Paul Naschy's classic La marca del hombre lobo (1968). Boris Karloff was initially approached to star in the film, but he eventually turned down the role following contractual wrangles, and died before the film was completed.

The musical score by Carlo Savina (later the music director of films such as The Godfather and Amarcord) was reused in the 1971 low-budget horror film La notte dei dannati.

== Release ==
Malenka was released in Spain on 3 August 1969.

Upon its later re-release as Fangs of the Living Dead, producers offered "free psychiatric care" for anyone disturbed by Malenka or either of the two other films they were showing, Curse of the Living Dead (aka Kill, Baby, Kill) and Revenge of the Living Dead (aka The Murder Clinic).
