= The Beast and the Magic Sword =

- Spanish: La Bestia y la Espada Magica
- Directed by: Paul Naschy (as Jacinto Molina)
- Written by: Paul Naschy
- Produced by: Masurao Takeda; Augusto Boué; Julia Saly
- Starring: Paul Naschy; Julia Saly; Beatriz Escudero
- Cinematography: Julio Burgos
- Edited by: Roberto Fandino
- Music by: Angel Arteaga; Kenji Onuma; Shigeru Amachi
- Distributed by: Aconito Films; Amachi Films
- Release dates: November 1983 (Brussels film festival); April 1984 (Spain)
- Running time: 120 minutes (USA)
- Countries: Spain; Japan
- Language: Spanish

The Beast and the Magic Sword (Spanish: La Bestia y la Espada Magica) is a 1983 Spanish/Japanese horror film that is the tenth in a long series of films about the werewolf Count Waldemar Daninsky, played by Paul Naschy. This film moved the Daninsky family curse back to a medieval setting, as Naschy felt the Daninsky saga need not always be confined to a modern-day setting.

The film was shot in Japan, and Naschy brought his wife and two sons with him for the adventure, even allowing them to appear in a brief cameo role in the picture.

Although Naschy always regarded this film to be one of the best movies he ever made, it was never dubbed in English, nor offered legally on VHS or DVD in the U.S. or the U.K. The film was however screened at the Brussels International Film Festival in November 1983, along with Naschy's other 1983 film Panic Beats, and Naschy was given a prize in recognition of his body of work in the cinefantastique genre.

The film first opened theatrically in Spain in April 1984. Although the film was a Spanish/Japanese co-production, for some reason it was never theatrically shown in Japan, nor in any country outside of Spain.

This film was followed by the 11th film in the series, entitled Licantropo, in 1996.

== Plot ==
A medieval warrior named Irineus Daninsky slays a Mongol chieftain in a duel which enrages a local witch who loved the Mongol. (Naschy's wife and two sons appeared in the audience that is shown watching the duel.) The witch learns that the King, in gratitude for Irineus' victory, allowed him to marry his daughter. Months later, after Irineus' wife becomes pregnant with his child, the witch puts a curse on the entire Daninsky lineage by biting the pregnant woman's belly with the skull of a werewolf. The king's guards kill the witch with a batch of arrows, but it's too late to stop the Daninsky curse from taking effect.

Centuries later, Waldemar Daninsky discovers he is a werewolf, and he goes to an old rabbi named Salom Jehuda for a possible cure. Unfortunately, the rabbi is killed by a group of racist villagers, but not before he tells Daninsky to go and seek out a Japanese wise man named Kian in the village of Kyoto who can possibly help him find a cure. The werewolf travels from Europe to Japan (bringing his wife with him) and finds Kian, who tells him there is a magic silver sword that can be used to free him from the curse. Meanwhile, an evil witch named Satomi is plotting to take control of Waldemar's mind, so that she can make him her servant and thereby enhance her mystical powers. Daninsky is captured by the witch and locked in a cage with a man-eating tiger. He transforms into a werewolf and slays the beast with just his fangs and claws. Kian manages to kill the witch and her minions, and get possession of the magic sword. After Daninsky's wife is slain accidentally, he has Kian use the silver sword to put him out of his misery forever. But an epilogue to the film hints that Daninsky may have earlier impregnated a Japanese girl named Akane with whom he had had an affair, and through her, the Daninsky curse may live again.

== Cast ==
- Paul Naschy - dual role as Waldemar Daninsky and Irineus Daninsky
- Shigeru Amachi as Kian, Akane's brother
- Beatriz Escudero as Kinga, Waldemar's wife
- Junko Asahina as Satomi, an evil witch
- Violeta Cela as Esther, a young priestess
- Sara Mora as Amese, Vulko's lover
- Yoko Fuji as Akane, Kian's sister
- Conrado San Martin as Salom Jehuda, the rabbi
- Helena Garret as Uswika, the King's daughter
- Yoshiro Kitamachi as Goto
- Gerard Tichy as Otton El Grande
- Jiro Miyaguchi as Eiko Watanabe, Kian's rival
- Jose Vivo as Liutprando de Cremona
- Irene Daina
- Antonio Duran
- Seijun Okabe
- Charly Bravo

== Production ==
Naschy said in an interview that he actually fought the tiger himself in the gripping man-vs-tiger finale, but that the crew had to feed the tiger 25 chickens before Naschy entered the cage, or the beast would have killed Naschy for sure.
