= Laura Valenzuela =

Spanish television presenter and actress (1931–2023)

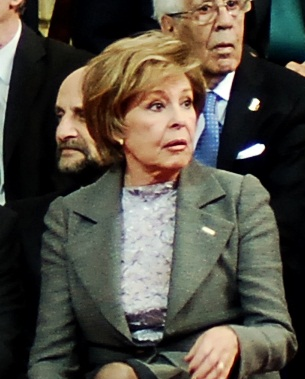
- Valenzuela in 2012
- Born: Rocío Espinosa López-Cepero; 18 February 1931; Seville, Spain
- Died: 17 March 2023 (aged 92); Madrid, Spain
- Other name: Laurita Valenzuela
- Occupations: Presenter; actress; model
- Years active: 1954–2006
- Spouse: José Luis Dibildos (m. 1971; died 2002)
- Children: 1

Rocío Espinosa López-Cepero (18 February 1931 – 17 March 2023), known professionally as Laura or Laurita Valenzuela (Spanish pronunciation: [ˈlawɾa lawˈɾita βalenˈθwela]), was a Spanish television presenter, actress and model. She was one of the first television presenters in Spain appearing in the early broadcasts of Televisión Española (TVE). In 1969, she hosted the Eurovision Song Contest held in Madrid.

Valenzuela received the Iris Lifetime Achievement Award presented by the Spanish Television Academy in 2012.

== Biography ==
Born in Seville on 18 February 1931, her first job was in a store in Madrid as an haute couture model. She made her film debut in 1954 and she was one of the first television presenters in Spain when Televisión Española (TVE) was launched in 1956. Between 1968 and 1970 she co-hosted with Joaquín Prat the musical show Galas del Sábado. She became known in Europe for hosting the 1969 edition of the Eurovision Song Contest held in Madrid. In 1970, she co-hosted, also with Prat, the second Festival de la Canción Española that was used as the Spanish national selection for Eurovision that year.

Valenzuela starred in many films from the early 1950s up through the late 1960s. In 1971, when she married film director José Luis Dibildos, she retired from public life and had her daughter, presenter Lara Dibildos. She returned to television in 1990 to host Tele 5 ¿dígame? on Telecinco. She also hosted for that channel the broadcast of the New Year's clock bell strikes live from Puerta del Sol in Madrid to welcome 1991 and 1992. Later on, in 1996, she returned to TVE with the show Mañanas de primera.

Valenzuela retired again in the 2000s when she was treated for breast cancer. She recovered but remained retired, apart from occasional collaborations and appearances, such as on 7 December 2006, when she hosted the special show Gala 50 años de TVE, which celebrated the 50th anniversary of TVE, alongside Anne Igartiburu and Paula Vázquez.

Valenzuela died from complications of Alzheimer's disease at La Princesa Hospital in Madrid, on 17 March 2023. She was 92.

== Selected filmography ==
=== Film ===
Year	Film
1954	High Fashion
1954	The Fisher of Songs
1955	It Happened in Seville
1957	The Tenant
1958	The Violet Seller
1959	Los tramposos
1960	Three Ladies
1961	Madame
1963	Eva 63
1963	The Daughters of Helena
1964	Cyrano and d'Artagnan
1964	The Black Tulip
1964	Hagan juego, señoras
1966	Las noches de Monsieur Max
1966	Z7 Operation Rembrandt
1966	Amor a la española
1967	Four Queens for an Ace
1967	Las que tienen que servir
1968	Los subdesarrollados
1968	La dinamita está servida
1969	De profesión, sus labores
1970	Growing Leg, Diminishing Skirt
1971	Spaniards in Paris

=== Television ===
Year	Program	Network	Role
1968–1970	Galas del sábado	TVE	Host with Joaquín Prat
1968	Contamos contigo	TVE	Host with Joaquín Prat
1969	Eurovision Song Contest 1969	TVE and EBU	Host
1970	Festival de la Canción Española 1970	TVE	Host with Joaquín Prat
1990–1992	Tele 5 ¿dígame?	Telecinco	Host with Javier Basilio, Paloma Lago and Naty Abascal
2006	Gala 50 años de TVE	TVE	Host with Anne Igartiburu and Paula Vázquez

== Accolades ==
Edition	Awards	Category	Work	Result	Ref.
1969	Antena de Oro	Television presenter		Won	
1971	CEC Awards	Best Actress	Spaniards in Paris	Won	
2005	TP de Oro	Honorary		Won	
2012	Iris Awards	Honorary		Won	

== Legacy ==
On 30 September 2024, Correos, the Spanish postal service, issued a sheet of stamps in tribute to her as part of its Spanish cinema series.

== See also ==
- List of Eurovision Song Contest presenters

Preceded by (United Kingdom) Katie Boyle	Eurovision Song Contest presenter 1969	Succeeded by (Netherlands) Willy Dobbe
