= Jacques Destoop =

French actor and painter (1931–2022)

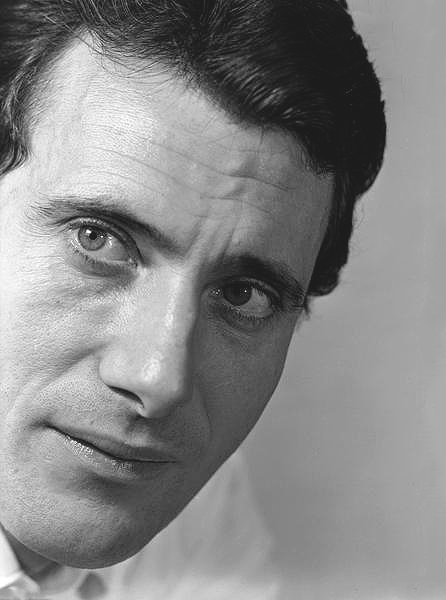
- Destoop in 1963
- Born: 17 June 1931; Paris, France
- Died: 6 June 2022 (aged 90); France
- Education: CNSAD
- Occupation(s): Actor; Painter

Jacques Destoop (17 June 1931 – 6 June 2022) was a French actor and painter.

== Biography ==
He was a Sociétaires of the Comédie-Française who attended CNSAD and was married to actress Geneviève Fontanel.

Outside of his acting career, Destoop was steeped in the art of painting. He first began exhibiting his works in 1990 at the Galerie Gérard Rambaud in Paris. His paintings were inspired by the roles he played on stage, such as Cyrano de Bergerac.

== Sound recordings ==
- Les Chimères (1962)

== Filmography ==
=== Cinema ===
- L'Amour à la chaîne (1965)
- Bye bye, Barbara (1969)
- La Punition (1973)

=== Television ===
- Le Chevalier d'Harmental (1966)
- Les Boussardel (1972)
- Au théâtre ce soir (1980)
