= Fernando Vizcaíno Casas =

Spanish labour lawyer, journalist, and writer

Fernando Vizcaíno Casas (1926–2003) was a Spanish labour lawyer, journalist and writer. His writings were generally supportive of Francoist Spain. During the 1970s and 1980s he collaborated with the director Rafael Gil on a number of films that supported this point of view. He wrote ...Y al tercer año, resucitó, Niñas… ¡al salón!, De "camisa vieja" a chaqueta nueva, 1975/El año en que Franco murió en la cama, and Viva Franco, con perdón, between others.

He died on 2 November 2003 in Madrid from a cancer at the age of 77.
