= Pancho Villa (film) =

1972 spaghetti western film by Eugenio Martín

- Theatrical release poster
- Directed by: Eugenio Martín
- Screenplay by: Julian Zimet (as Julian Halevy)
- Story by: Eugenio Martín
- Produced by: Bernard Gordon
- Starring: Telly Savalas; Clint Walker; Chuck Connors; Anne Francis
- Cinematography: Alejandro Ulloa
- Edited by: Antonio Ramírez de Loaysa
- Music by: Antón García Abril
- Production companies: Granada Films; Scotia International
- Distributed by: Scotia International Film Distributors
- Release date: 31 October 1972 (West Germany)
- Running time: 92 minutes
- Countries: Italy; Spain
- Language: English

Pancho Villa is a 1972 Italian-Spanish spaghetti western film directed by Eugenio Martín. It takes as its starting point the life and legend of the Mexican bandit-revolutionary of that name, but has no other basis in historical fact. The film features Telly Savalas, Clint Walker, Chuck Connors and Anne Francis. Shot in Spain, this "brawling spectacle" has an often-overlooked light-comedy satirical facet, which to this day often confuses viewers. The storyline was developed during the Vietnam War and reflected certain antiwar sentiments in an American society. The title song "We All End Up the Same", with music by John Cacavas and lyrics by Don Black, is sung by Savalas.

== Plot ==
After being double-crossed in an arms deal by a gun merchant McDermott (Luis Dávila) from Columbus, New Mexico, legendary Mexican revolutionary Pancho Villa (Telly Savalas) and his American lieutenant Scotty (Clint Walker) decide to exact revenge by raiding a US Army weapons depot in Columbus and seizing McDermott. The detail-obsessed Colonel Wilcox (Chuck Conners) and his army is stationed on the American side of the border. Also on the scene is Flo (Anne Francis), Scotty's wife, the two of them enjoy a bickering relationship.

== Cast ==
- Telly Savalas as Pancho Villa
- Clint Walker as Scotty
- Chuck Connors as Col. Wilcox
- Anne Francis as Flo
- José María Prada as Luis
- Ángel del Pozo as Lt. Eager
- Luis Dávila as McDermott
- Mónica Randall as Lupe
- Antonio Casas as General Goyo
- Alberto Dalbés as Captain Mendoza
- Walter Coy as General Pershing

== Production ==
Producer Bernard Gordon wrote in his autobiography that Telly Savalas and Clint Walker did not get along during the shooting of the movie. Savalas made attempts to upstage Walker and even insisted on changing some two-shots into solo shots. Conversely, Clint Walker enjoyed Anne Francis's companionship, unlike his onscreen character. This was important to Walker, as not much time had passed since he had barely survived a skiing accident, which, as he told Gordon, completely changed his life. Gordon stated that the production was finished on time and on budget despite script problems.
