= Eugenio Martín =

Spanish film director and screenwriter (1925–2023)

- Born: Eugenio Martín Márquez; 15 May 1925; Ceuta, Spain
- Died: 23 January 2023 (aged 97); Madrid, Spain
- Education: Universidad de Granada
- Occupations: Film director and screenwriter

Eugenio Martín Márquez (15 May 1925 – 23 January 2023) was a Spanish film director and screenwriter. He was known for the low-budget genre films he made in the 1960s and 1970s, including Bad Man's River, The Bounty Killer, and Horror Express, the latter being particularly notable for its inclusion of the well-known English actors Christopher Lee and Peter Cushing, famous for their work with Hammer Films. Though never remarkably successful either at the box office or among critics, Martín's films, particularly Horror Express, have achieved cult status. The popular horror film magazine Fangoria included Horror Express in its book, 101 Best Horror Movies You've Never Seen: A Celebration of the World's Most Unheralded Fright Flicks.

== Early life and first films ==
Martín was born on 15 May 1925 in Ceuta. He was a child when the Spanish Civil War broke out. Since the uprising first broke out among Nationalist generals in Spanish Africa, the African port city of Ceuta was immediately embroiled in violence. Following the death or arrest of friends and family members, Martín's family fled to Granada on the Spanish mainland. After publishing a volume of verse, Martín's interests veered toward cinema, and while still at university he created Granada's first film society. Though he considered leaving Francoist Spain for a less censorious environment, he eventually decided to stay in Spain, accepted into the "Institute of Cinematic Investigation and Experiences" in Madrid. At the institute, Martín made a series of well-regarded short films and documentaries before making his first feature film Despedida de soltero ("Farewell to the Single Life"), in 1957.

== International collaborations and commercial success ==
When European film crews began frequently using Spain as an affordable site for location shooting, Martín took advantage of opportunities for collaboration and worked with a number of foreign directors, most notably Nicholas Ray. He had the opportunity to direct films using international casts and crew which familiarized him with many different players in 1960s cinema, by many accounts among the most fertile and creative periods in film history.

In 1966 Martín directed The Bounty Killer (released as The Ugly Ones in the United States), the first of many Westerns he was to create. It remains among his better known works; dialogue from the film was sampled in the RZA track, "Ode to Django," which appeared in the credits of the 2012 Quentin Tarantino film Django Unchained. The director maintained that the concept behind his film antedated and influenced the Sergio Leone film For a Few Dollars More, worked on by Duccio Tessari - a mutual acquaintance of Martín and his friend and former teacher José G. Maesso.

Martín made several musicals and giallo-type films in the following years, solidifying his reputation as "an auteur in every genre", per the subtitle of a recent biography. The director's filmography and competence in English led American producer Philip Yordan to contract him for three films, which remain among his better-known works: Bad Man's River, Pancho Villa, and Horror Express. These films have decidedly uneven critical reputations, but the latter especially remains a favorite among fans of its lead actors, Christopher Lee and Peter Cushing.

Martín's international profile dropped significantly after his 1973 film, A Candle for the Devil, released in North America as It Happened at Nightmare Inn. After this release, most of his work was in Spanish-language television.

On 11 October 2017, he was honored for the fiftieth anniversary of his film El precio de un hombre (1967) at the 7th Almería Western Film Festival.

== Personal life and death ==
Martín died in Madrid on 23 January 2023, at the age of 97.

== Selected filmography ==
- Il conquistatore di Maracaibo (1961), starring Hans von Borsody
- Despedida de soltero (1961), starring Germán Cobos, Silvia Solar
- Hypnosis (1962), starring Götz George, Jean Sorel, Heinz Drache
- Golden Goddess of Rio Beni (1964), starring Pierre Brice
- Captain from Toledo (1965), starring Stephen Forsyth
- The Bounty Killer (1967), starring Tomas Milian
- Requiem for a Gringo (1968)
- Una señora estupenda (1967), starring Lola Flores
- Las Leandras (1969), starring Rocío Dúrcal
- La vida sigue igual (1969), starring Julio Iglesias
- The Fourth Victim (1971) a.k.a. Death at the Deep End of the Swimming Pool, starring Carroll Baker
- Bad Man's River (1971), starring Lee Van Cleef, Gina Lollobrigida, James Mason
- Horror Express (1972), starring Peter Cushing, Christopher Lee, Telly Savalas
- Pancho Villa (1972), starring Telly Savalas, Clint Walker
- A Candle for the Devil (1973) a.k.a. It Happened at Nightmare Inn, starring Judy Geeson
- The Girl from the Red Cabaret (1973), starring Mel Ferrer, Marisol
- No quiero perder la honra (1975), starring Ángela Molina, José Sacristán
- Esclava te doy (1976), starring Alfredo Landa
- Call Girl (1976)
- Tengamos la guerra en paz (1977)
- Aquella casa en las afueras (1980) aka The House in the Outskirts
- Supernatural (1981) a.k.a. Return of the Poltergeist, starring Cristina Galbó
- La sal de la vida (1996), starring Patxi Andión, Ivonne Reyes, Juan Diego Botto
