= Night of the Seagulls =

- Original Spanish poster
- Directed by: Amando de Ossorio
- Written by: Amando de Ossorio
- Produced by: José Ángel Santos
- Starring: Víctor Petit; María Kosti; Sandra Mozarowsky; Javier de Rivera; Jose Antonio Calvo
- Cinematography: Francisco Sánchez
- Edited by: Pedro del Rey
- Music by: Antón García Abril
- Distributed by: Excel Telemedia International
- Release date: 26 July 1976
- Running time: 98 minutes
- Country: Spain
- Language: Spanish

Night of the Seagulls (Original Spanish: La noche de las gaviotas, also known as Don't Go Out at Night, and Night of the Death Cult) is a 1975 Spanish horror film written and directed by Amando de Ossorio. The film is the fourth and final in the Blind Dead series, being the sequel to The Ghost Galleon (1974).

== Plot ==
The film starts in medieval times, when a young couple is attacked by the Knights Templar. The man is instantly killed, and the woman is carried away to the Templars' castle, where she is sacrificed.

The story then continues in the 20th century. Doctor Henry Stein (Víctor Petit) and his wife Joan (María Kosti) are moving into a very primitive coastal town, where they are met with distrust and hatred from the locals.

It does not take long before the doctor and his wife find out that the town harbors an ancient evil: Every seven years, undead Templars rise from the sea for seven consecutive nights to demand the sacrifice of a young maiden. The doctor and his wife then try to save one of the maidens, Lucy (Sandra Mozarowsky), from her horrible fate, aided by the local village idiot, Teddy (José Antonio Calvo).

== Cast ==
- Víctor Petit as Dr. Henry Stein
- María Kosti as Joan Stein
- Sandra Mozarowsky as Lucy
- José Antonio Calvo as Teddy
- Julia Saly as Tilda Flanagan
- Javier de Rivera as the Doctor

== Release ==
The film was released by BCI on DVD as a multi-disc set on December 3, 2002, and again on April 15, 2003. Blue Underground later released a limited-edition version of the film on September 27, 2005. It was also released November 14, 2005 by Anchor Bay Entertainment in the UK. Blue Underground re-released the film on DVD on September 26, 2006.

Scream Factory released the film on Blu-ray for the first time on February 13, 2018.

== Reception ==
Writing in The Zombie Movie Encyclopedia, academic Peter Dendle said, "The film competently delivers the usual atmospheric settings, well-composed shots, and glacier-slow zombies, though overall it's probably the least interesting of the tetralogy". Paul Corupe of DVD Verdict wrote, "Although a weak story still dominates most of the action, Night of the Seagulls is in many ways a return to form for the series, yet another variation on the Templar legend that lacks continuity with the earlier films". Adam Tyner of DVD Talk called it "outright boring". Glenn Kay, author of Zombie Movies: The Ultimate Guide, called it "a fitting end to the exploits of its ancient skeletal villains".
