= Amando de Ossorio =

Spanish film director (1918–2001)

- Born: 6 April 1918; Coruña, Galicia, Spain
- Died: 13 January 2001 (aged 82); Madrid, Spain
- Occupations: film director, artist and film writer

Amando de Ossorio (6 April 1918 – 13 January 2001) was one of the foremost Spanish horror film directors during the European horror film surge in the 1970s, known especially for his "Blind Dead" tetralogy.

== Biography ==
De Ossorio directed a short political film in 1956 called The Black Flag, then spent the next few years doing documentaries and commercials. He was also a talented painter and artist. In 1964, he was hired to direct a few innocuous westerns and comedies, then he moved into horror in 1969 where he made his mark with Malenka, The Vampire's Niece.

Amando de Ossorio complained in interviews that right from the start of his directing career, his producers were always tampering with his projects. His first horror film, Malenka, The Vampire's Niece (1969), was written to be a psychological thriller about a young woman who inherits a castle in Europe and is summarily driven crazy by her uncle who tries to convince her that he and she are both vampires. At the end of the film, the uncle's scheme is revealed and explained by her boyfriend to be a hoax. However, after de Ossorio finished the film, the producers decided to make the uncle an actual vampire (in the English-language version only), and added a low-budget disintegration scene to the finale of the English-dubbed prints that completely contradicted the plot.

In 1971, de Ossorio came up with the concept of The Blind Dead, a cult of blind, undead Templar Knights who sucked human blood, rode skeletal ghost-horses and were attracted to their victims by the sound of their heartbeat. The first film, Tombs of the Blind Dead, was so successful, he immediately embarked on a career as a "European" horror film director. Three more "Blind Dead" films followed in quick succession: Return of the Blind Dead, The Ghost Galleon and Night of the Seagulls.

Monsters very similar to de Ossorio's Templar Knights later appeared in two other Spanish horror films, Jesus Franco's film Mansion of the Living Dead (1982) and Paul Naschy's film La cruz del diablo ("The Devil's Cross") (1974). Those two films were not connected to de Ossorio's in any way however, they were simply homages.

De Ossorio filmed several other stand-alone horror films during this time, including Night of the Sorcerers and The Loreley's Grasp. His 1975 Demon Witch Child (one of the many European Exorcist clones) is today regarded by his fans as an underrated must-see horror classic. In the late 70s, de Ossorio's name even wound up on a couple of X-Rated adult films. (The Spanish horror film industry petered out after 1975 and, unlike the Italian film industry which rebounded with gory zombie and cannibal films in 1980, the Spanish horror film market never recovered.)

He started to direct a cannibal film called Man Hunter (aka Devil Hunter) in 1980, but Spanish director Jesús Franco was given the project by the producer, and de Ossorio gracefully bowed out. Also in 1980, de Ossorio began directing a historical drama (peplum) entitled Los Cantabros (The Cantabrians), but he was replaced on the project by Paul Naschy, who agreed to direct the picture if he was allowed to start the whole project from scratch, working up an entirely new screenplay and hiring his own actor friends to replace de Ossorio's cast members.

Strangely, many of the actors who regularly appeared in Jesus Franco's films also worked for Amando de Ossorio, such as Jack Taylor, Montserrat Prous, Paul Muller, Fernando Bilbao, Luis Barboo, Rosanna Yanni and Kali Hansa. He also worked with Julia Saly & Helga Liné, two actresses who starred in a number of Paul Naschy's horror films during the same period.

De Ossorio's last horror film, the 1984 Sea Serpent (which had been his dream project for many years) was a disappointment to him due to the very low-budget special effects he was forced to utilize, and led him to retire from filmmaking in 1984, at age 66.

He was interviewed for a 2001 documentary about his life entitled Amando de Ossorio: The Last Templar just a short time before he died. During the interview, de Ossorio complained about the pitifully tiny budgets he was always forced to work within, and he lamented that in almost every case, the finished project never came close to what he had envisioned when he first conceived each film. He cited his worst disappointment being the abysmal special effects that appeared at the climax of his The Ghost Galleon (1974), wherein the producers actually used a plastic toy boat in a bathtub to represent the Spanish galleon that burns and sinks at the end of the film.

In his final years, he augmented his income by producing scary oil paintings of his Templar Knights and selling them to his fans. In 1993, de Ossorio was shopping around a script for a fifth Blind Dead film, to be called "The Necronomicon of the Templars", but he failed to interest a producer in the project. He died on January 13, 2001 from natural causes at age 82. His four "Blind Dead" films are now available in a deluxe DVD box set, and most of his other horror films are also available now on DVD, with the exception of The Sea Serpent (which has only been released on VHS).

== Complete filmography ==
- La Bandera Negra (The Black Flag), 1956 (short political drama made as an independent film project)
- Grave of the Gunfighter, 1964 (a spaghetti western) starred Jack Taylor
- Escuela de enfermeras (Nursing School) 1964
- I tre del Colorado (Three From Colorado), 1966 (a spaghetti western); a.k.a. Rebels In Canada, or Canadian Wilderness
- Pasto de Fieras (Field of Beasts), 1967 (children's drama)
- La Niña del Patio (The Girl in the Yard), 1967 (comedy)
- Malenka, The Vampire's Niece (1969) a.k.a. Malenka, la Nipote del Vampiro; starred Anita Ekberg, Rosanna Yanni, Diana Lorys, Paul Muller, Julian Ugarte and Fernando Bilbao; released on DVD as Fangs of the Living Dead (English language version only).
- Tombs of the Blind Dead (1971) (first film in the Blind Dead series) a.k.a. La Noche del Terror Ciego, a.k.a. The Blind Dead; starred Lone Fleming; DVD features both the edited English language print, as well as the unedited Spanish language print along with its alternate opening sequence.
- Return of the Blind Dead (1973) (second film in the Blind Dead series) a.k.a. The Return of the Evil Dead, a.k.a. El Ataque de los Muertos Sin Ojos; starred Tony Kendall, Lone Fleming and Luis Barboo; DVD features both the English language version as well as the slightly longer Spanish version.
- The Loreley's Grasp (1974) a.k.a. Las Garras de Lorelei; starred Tony Kendall and Helga Liné; released on VHS as When The Screaming Stops, and later on DVD as The Loreley's Grasp; DVD features both the English and Spanish language versions, completely unedited.
- Night of the Sorcerers (1974) a.k.a. La Noche de los Brujos/ The Night of the Witches; starred Jack Taylor and Kali Hansa; DVD features both the English and Spanish versions, completely unedited.
- The Ghost Galleon (1974) (third film in the Blind Dead series); a.k.a. El Buque Maldito / The Cursed Ship/ Ghost Ship of the Blind Dead; starred Jack Taylor and Maria Perschy; released on VHS as Horror of the Zombies, and later on DVD as The Ghost Galleon; DVD features both the English and Spanish versions, completely unedited.
- Demon Witch Child (1974) a.k.a. La Endemoniada; a.k.a. El Poder de las Tinieblas; starred Kali Hansa, Julia Saly and Montserrat Prous; released on VHS and DVD as Demon Witch Child.
- Night of the Seagulls (1975) (fourth and final film in the Blind Dead series) a.k.a. La Noche de las Gaviotas/ Terror Beach/ Don't Go Out At Night!; starred Maria Kosti and Julia Saly; released on VHS as Night of the Death Cult, and later on DVD as Night of the Seagulls; DVD features both the English and Spanish versions, completely unedited.
- Las Alimañas (The Vermin), 1976 (X-Rated film)
- Pasión Prohibida (Forbidden Passion), 1980 (X-Rated film)
- The Sea Serpent (1984) a.k.a. Serpiente del Mar / Hydra, The Sea Monster; starred Ray Milland, Timothy Bottoms, Taryn Power, Jack Taylor and Jared Martin; released on VHS as The Sea Serpent (English language version only)
