= Jay Paul Deratany =

American lawyer and filmmaker

- Born: Detroit, Michigan, U.S.
- Education: DePaul University College of Law (JD); University of California, Riverside (MFA)
- Occupations: Lawyer, filmmaker, writer
- Employer(s): Deratany & Kosner
- Website: lawinjury.com

Jay Paul Deratany is an American lawyer, filmmaker and writer. He is the founder of Deratany & Kosner in Chicago and focuses his practice on human rights issues. He is the writer and producer of the feature film Foster Boy as well as the play Haram! Iran!.

== Biography ==
Deratany was born in Detroit, Michigan and obtained his J.D. degree from DePaul University College of Law. He founded The Deratany Firm, a law firm based in Chicago. Practicing law he has won numerous human rights advocate cases including the largest jury verdict in Lake County history.

Deratany is also a filmmaker, having received a Master of Fine Arts from the University of California, Riverside. He has written such films as Foster Boy and Saugatuck Cures. Foster Boy is based on actual cases he worked as an attorney, and won numerous awards at national film festivals. He is the author of the play Haram! Iran! which is based on the story of Mahmoud Asgari and Ayaz Marhoni who were put to death in Iran for an alleged homosexual encounter.

He is also the co-author of the book Lincoln's Dilemma.

== Filmography ==
=== Film ===
Year	Title	Credited as	Notes
2019	Foster Boy	Writer, producer, actor (Captain)	Award winner at Pan African Film Festival, Sedona Film Festival, Woodstock Film Festival, Garden State Film Festival
2015	Saugatuck Cures	Writer, executive producer, actor (Reverend Stan)	Also wrote the screenplay
2014	Out	Associate producer	Short film
2012	The Apple Tree	Executive producer	Short film

=== Theatre ===
Year	Title	Credited as	Notes
2017	The Civility of Albert Cashier	Writer	
2010	Haram! Iran!	Writer, producer, actor (Captain)	GLAAD Media Award nomination

== Personal life ==
Deratany has been involved with numerous causes, mainly focused on helping foster children. He was also inducted into the Chicago LGBT Hall of Fame for his work with LGBT youth and filmmaking.
