= Ben Patrick Johnson =

American voice-over actor (born 1969)

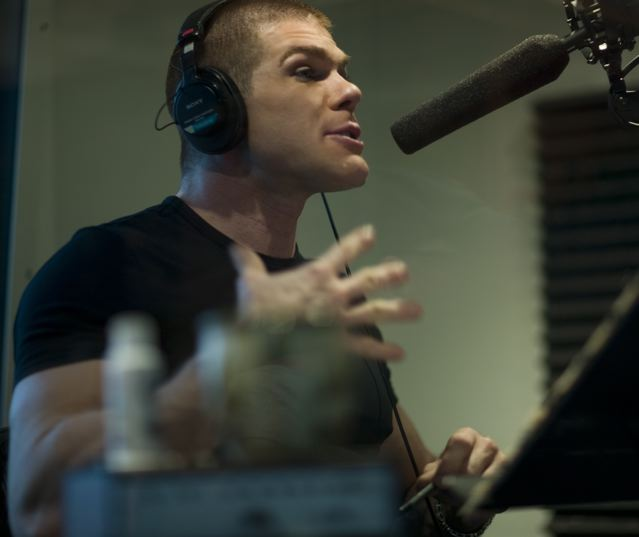
- Johnson in the studio, 2006
- Born: June 30, 1969 (age 57); Tucson, Arizona
- Occupations: Foundation director, voice actor, writer, activist, blogger, author
- Years active: 1991–present

Ben Patrick Johnson (born June 30, 1969, in Tucson, Arizona) is an American voice actor, author and blogger, Foundation Director, and human rights activist.

== Voice-overs ==
Early in his acting career, he participated in voice-over workshops with Joan Gerber.

Johnson appeared on CBS (promoting Survivor, CSI: NY, Numbers and other shows), Fox (for House M.D., Bones, Family Guy, The Cleveland Show and Raising Hope), the cable channels Nickelodeon, Nick@Nite, Cartoon Network, Starz, NFL Network, Big Ten Network, The 101 Network, N3D and others. His voice has been used to promote movies such as Ice Age, Ice Age: Dawn of the Dinosaurs, Marmaduke, The Whole Ten Yards, Gulliver's Travels, Sleepover, The Simpsons Movie, Alvin and the Chipmunks, Glee: The 3D Concert Movie, Planet 51, The Pirates! In an Adventure with Scientists!, The Emoji Movie, Night at the Museum, Home, Kung Fu Panda 3, Trolls, The Boss Baby, Hot Tub Time Machine, Diary of a Wimpy Kid, Sonic the Hedgehog, Ferdinand, Detective Pikachu, Sherlock Gnomes, The Pianist, Minority Report, Signs, and Apocalypse Now, Adam Sandler movies like Eight Crazy Nights and 50 First Dates promos for Judge Maria Lopez, and in commercials for Burger King, Kellogg's and Old Navy. He’s an announcer from The Michigan Lottery’s Make Me Rich! from 2009 to 2012.

In 1998, after a brief stint at E!, Johnson moved to Extra's rival entertainment magazine Entertainment Tonight, where he was that show's signature voice for the next four seasons. From 1998 to 2005, he was the announcer on the syndicated court show Judge Joe Brown.

== Writing ==
Johnson's newest novel, "If the Rains Don't Cleanse," was published in August 2009 by Havenhurst Books. It is a historical novel detailing the experiences of Johnson's parents while Christian schoolteacher missionaries in Belgian Congo in the 1950s and addressing themes of Christianity, spirituality and European Colonialism.

Previous novels include In and Out in Hollywood, a roman à clef about a celebrity news show anchor whose fortunes change after he comes out, Third and Heaven, and One Size Fits All, which details the excesses of a young fashion designer dressing three Best Actress nominees for the Oscars.

== Social media and activism ==
In 2006, Johnson launched a webcast called Life on the Left Coast. The video blog featured news, celebrity friends and humor segments. Johnson's political commentaries, another staple of the webcast, upset a variety of Christian Right Organizations including The Capital Resource Institute after Johnson condemned the CRI for its position on a bill pending in the California Legislature. CRI issued a statement denouncing Johnson, Equality California, and the webcast. After more than a million views on YouTube, Johnson put the show on hiatus to focus on writing and activism via Facebook and Twitter. Johnson is on the board of Gay Men's Chorus of Los Angeles.

In September 2010, Johnson wrote and produced two political TV spots for Equality California, Whitman Shame and Cooley Shame. The ads, directed at CA Republican gubernatorial candidate Meg Whitman and Republican Attorney General candidate Steve Cooley, address the candidates' pledges to defend CA Prop 8 in a potential court challenge. Writing about EQCA and Johnson's ads, gay activist blogger Rex Wockner suggested that this was the first time a major LGBTQ organization had gone on the political offensive by playing hardball in TV ads about same-sex marriage.

== Philanthropy ==
The Ben Patrick Johnson Foundation, launched in 2006, benefits LGBT Issues, Human Rights, Education and interfaith dialogue. Shortly after its inception, the BPJ Foundation partnered with the organization Live and Give to fund housing for an elementary school in Thailand's Chiang Mai Province. The Foundation also passes funding to Habitat for Humanity, the micro-loan organization Kiva, Gay and Lesbian Elder Housing, and The National Gay and Lesbian Task Force for its interfaith initiative, The Institute for Welcoming Resources.

== Extra controversy ==
Johnson's first national exposure came in 1994 when he was chosen as co-host for Extra, an entertainment magazine show. Extra demoted Johnson to Senior Correspondent shortly after he came out as gay in the LGBT press and on KABC Talkradio, where he had been Director of Production prior to Extra. Warner Bros. Television, the producers of Extra, declined to comment on the demotion.

== See also ==
- List of male underwear models
