= Scott Long =

American LGBTQ activist

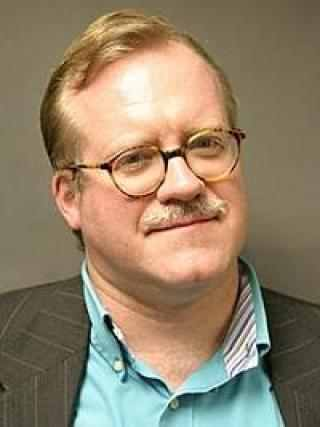
- Human rights activist Scott Long
- Born: June 5, 1963 (age 63); Radford, Virginia (USA)
- Education: Radford University; Harvard University (PhD)
- Known for: Human rights/LGBT rights activism
- Website: http://paper-bird.net

Scott Long (born June 5, 1963, in Radford, Virginia) is a US-born activist for international human rights, primarily focusing on the rights of lesbian, gay, bisexual, and transgender (LGBT) people. He founded the Lesbian, Gay, Bisexual, and Transgender Rights Program at Human Rights Watch, the first-ever program on LGBTQ rights at a major "mainstream" human rights organization, and served as its executive director from May 2004 - August 2010. He later was a visiting fellow in the Human Rights Program of Harvard Law School from 2011 to 2012.

Journalist Rex Wockner called Long "arguably the most knowledgeable person on the planet about international LGBT issues." David Mixner called him "one of the unsung heroes of the LGBT community." Long's blog, A Paper Bird, which focuses on global politics and sexuality, has been acclaimed as "must-read," "indispensable," and "brilliant." Hadi Ghaemi, executive director of the International Campaign for Human Rights in Iran, praised Long's "exemplary dedication and diligence," saying that "His articulate and relentless defense of LGBT rights everywhere is unparalleled, and his tremendous efforts on this front have been a guiding voice for justice and equality."

== Early life ==
Scott Long was born June 5, 1963, in Radford, Virginia. He graduated from Radford University at the age of 18, and received a Ph.D. in literature from Harvard University in 1989 at the age of 25. In 1990 he moved to Hungary, and taught literature at the Eötvös Loránd University in Budapest. He became involved with the emerging lesbian and gay movement in Hungary as it developed during the democratic transition. He organized the first course on sexuality and gender at the Eötvös Loránd University.

== Early human rights activism ==
In 1992 Long accepted a senior Fulbright professorship teaching American studies at the University of Cluj-Napoca, Romania. There, together with a few underground Romanian activists, he became deeply involved in campaigning for LGBT rights in Romania, including campaigns against Article 200 of the Romanian penal code, a law dating from the Ceauşescu dictatorship that criminalized consensual homosexual acts with five years' imprisonment.

Working independently from any institution, Long visited dozens of Romanian prisons over the following years, interviewing prisoners, linking them to legal assistance, and documenting torture and arbitrary arrest of lesbians as well as gay men. One of the first cases he investigated was that of Ciprian Cucu and Marian Mutașcu, two young men – respectively 17 and 19 – who had become lovers. Jailed for months, the two were tortured brutally. Soon after Marian Mutascu committed suicide. Long visited their home towns, interviewed family members, and confronted the arresting officer and prosecutors. Information he provided persuaded Amnesty International to recognize the two men as prisoners of conscience, the first time the organization had taken up the case of a couple jailed for their sexual orientation. The international pressure Long helped create won the two their freedom.

Long was an outspoken voice on LGBTQ rights within Romania, participating in a controversial Bucharest conference on "Homosexuality: A human right?" organized in 1995 by the Dutch Embassy and UNESCO – the first public discussion of LGBTQ human rights in the country. He was a founding member of the Romanian gay and lesbian organization Accept. His documentation was crucial in persuading the Council of Europe to strengthen its stand on lesbian and gay issues, and to demand that Romania repeal its sodomy law. His work spearheaded a European campaign and contributed strongly to Romania's eventual repeal of Article 200 in 2001.

In 1993 Long conducted the first-ever mission to Albania to investigate the state of LGBTQ rights and to meet with gay activists there, and his documentation of arrests and abuses helped lead to the repeal of that country's sodomy law.

== IGLHRC ==
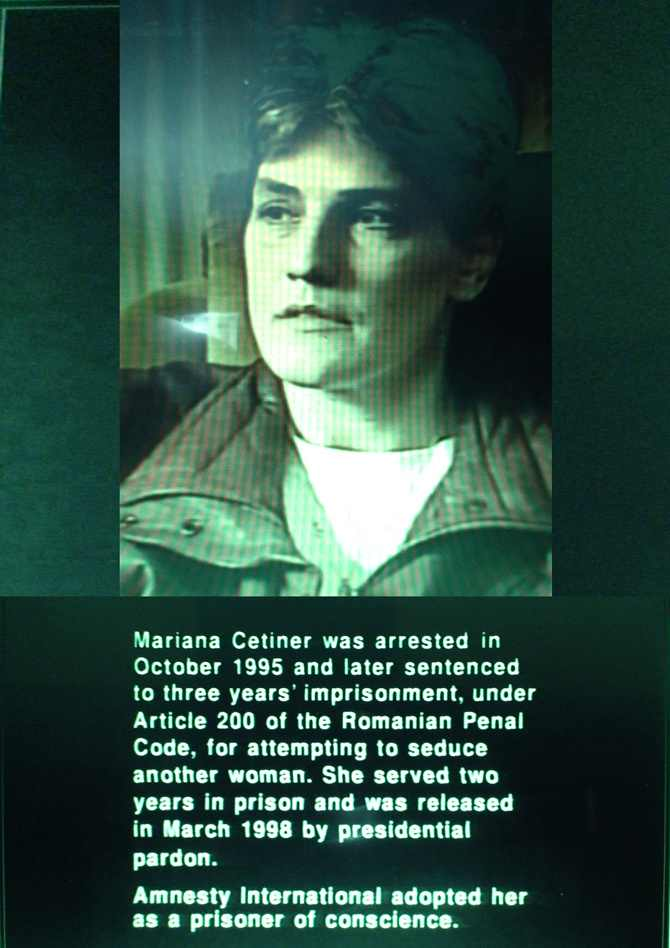
Mariana Cetiner, possibly the last person jailed in Romania for her sexual orientation. Long visited her in prison, documented her story, persuaded Amnesty International to take up her case, and personally lobbied President Emil Constantinescu to pardon her

Returning to the United States in 1996, Long accepted a position with the International Gay and Lesbian Human Rights Commission (IGLHRC) — a NGO combating rights abuses based on sexual orientation, gender identity, and HIV status — first as its advocacy director, then as program director. He continued to work with activists in Romania, returning to the country in 1997 for additional research. During that research, he learned of the imprisonment of Mariana Cetiner, a woman given a three-year sentence for attempting to have sex with another woman. Long later testified to the U.S. Congress that

I interviewed Mariana in prison. She had enormous bruises; she had been physically and sexually abused by the guards. The prison doctor told us, "After all, she is different from other women. You can hardly expect the guards to treat her as if she were normal.

Long documented Cetiner's story and persuaded Amnesty International to adopt her as a prisoner of conscience, the first time the organization had taken up the case of a lesbian imprisoned for her sexual orientation. Later that year, he wrote Public Scandals: Sexual Orientation and Criminal Law in Romania, a detailed study jointly published by IGLHRC and Human Rights Watch – the first report on LGBTQ issues ever issued by the latter organization.

In Bucharest in 1998, Long met with Romanian president Emil Constantinescu, who "promised to pardon all those incarcerated under Article 200 and to give priority to the repeal of the discriminatory article." Long specifically lobbied for Mariana Cetiner, who was promptly freed on the president's order. In the next three years, according to political scientist Clifford Bob, Long "enthusiastically and skillfully" pushed the Romanian government toward full repeal of Article 200, which was finally achieved in 2001.

Between 1998 and 2002, he organized a project bringing many grassroots lesbian, gay, bisexual, and transgender activists from the global South to speak and advocate before the then United Nations Commission on Human Rights. Long also gave UN bodies extensive information and analyses on abuses against LGBTQ people. This lobbying brought about an unprecedented commitment by key U.N. human rights officials to work on issues of sexual orientation and gender identity. In 2001, six independent experts—high-level individuals appointed by the UN to investigate patterns of human rights abuse—publicly reached out to lesbian, gay, bisexual, transgender, and queer (LGBTQ) communities, formally declaring that these issues lay within their official mandates. Long said of the move, "Today the United Nations has lived up to its promise: to defend the dignity of all people without exception."

Long also led IGLHRC's lobbying at the groundbreaking 2001 United Nations General Assembly Special Session on HIV/AIDS. IGLHRC was invited to address the session, then blocked by conservative Islamic states and the Holy See. The crisis eventually reached the floor of the General Assembly, which had never discussed LGBTQ rights before but was forced to vote on whether the LGBTQ group could speak. Long's advocacy led to a victory and to IGLHRC's reinstatement. "This was the first time a gay and lesbian issue has ever been debated on the floor of the General Assembly," Long commented on the unprecedented vote. "It's a precedent that will have serious impact on the way vulnerable groups and marginalized groups and outsiders from all parts of society can get involved in the U.N."

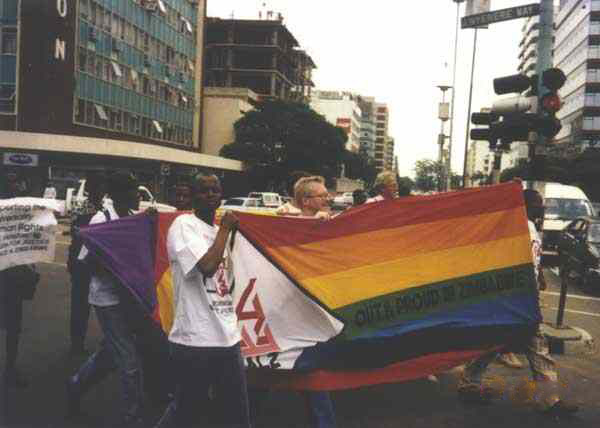
Queer activists joined by Scott Long (center, behind flag) participate in Zimbabwe's first-ever LGBT rights march on Human Rights Day, December 10, 1998, in Harare

From 1998, when he led a delegation to the World Council of Churches's world conference in Harare, Zimbabwe, and visited Zambia during a huge national furor over a young gay man's public coming-out in the media, Long was closely involved with sexual rights movements across Africa. He connected homophobia and moral panics in many African countries to economic and political factors, especially the poverty and dislocation caused by structural adjustment programs. In an interview with the Chicago Tribune, Long said that "there's a sense of economic and political powerlessness, and when you feel powerless about your economy and your country's politics there's a tendency to turn to culture as the one thing you can exert control over." In 2003, IGLHRC and Human Rights Watch released More than a Name: State-Sponsored Homophobia and its Consequences in Southern Africa, a 300-page investigation of the roots of homophobia that Long had researched and authored.

Long also co-authored or edited major reports on gay, lesbian, and transgender parenting, and on sexuality-based attacks on women's organizing. He also wrote a widely used guide to grassroots advocacy at the United Nations. While at IGLHRC, Long was responsible for one of the first broad statements on sex workers' rights ever issued by any international human rights organization, affirming that "Sex workers enjoy the rights to work, to equality before the law, to family, to sustenance, and to a sexual life, in the same degree and under the same conditions as do all other persons."

== Human Rights Watch ==
=== Egypt ===
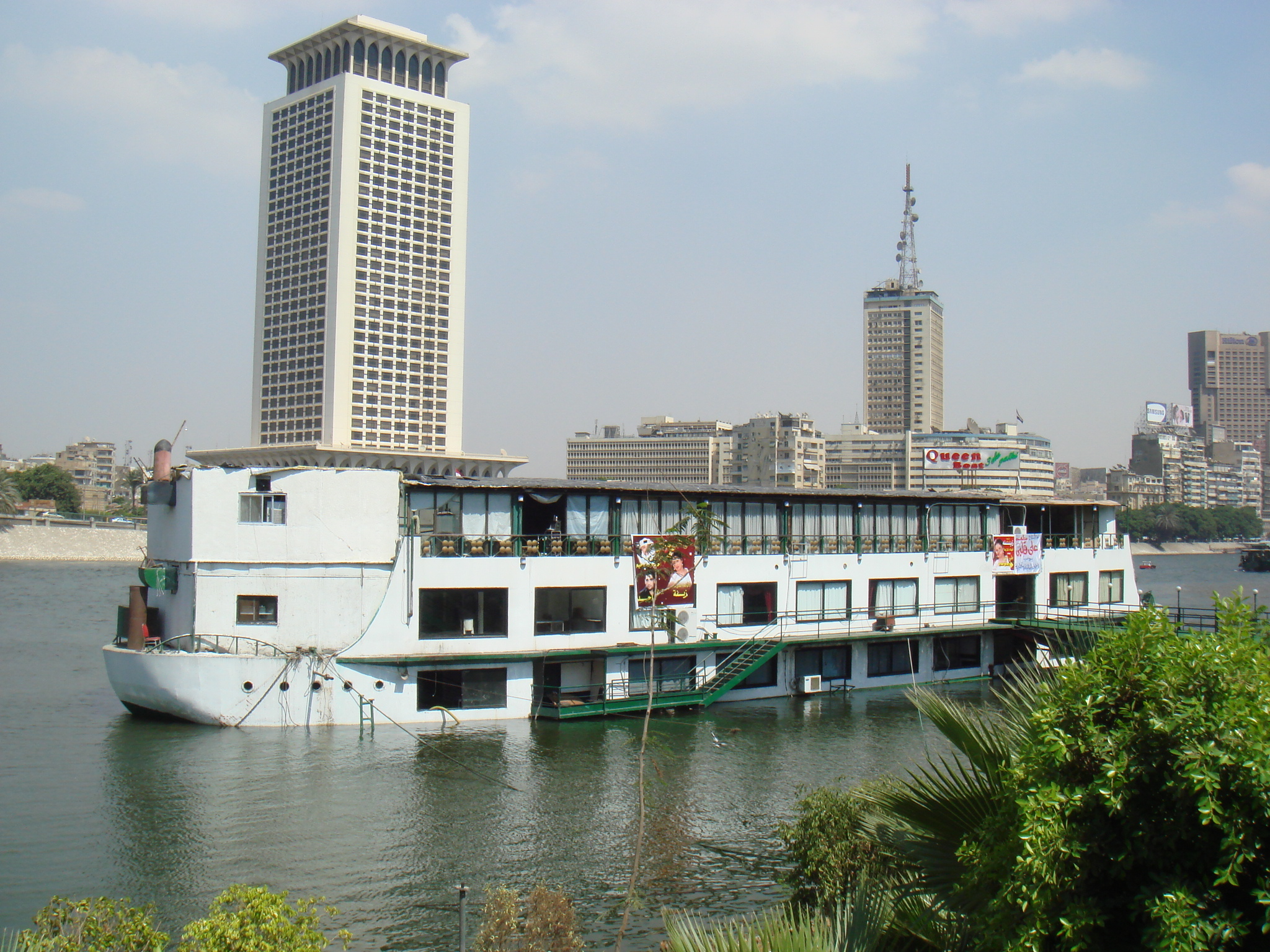
The Queen Boat floating discotheque in the Nile in Cairo

In 2002, Long left IGLHRC to join Human Rights Watch (HRW), the largest U.S.-based human rights organization. Since 2001, Long had been deeply engaged in combating a crackdown on homosexual conduct in Egypt. In May 2001, police in Cairo raided a floating Nile discothèque called the Queen Boat, arresting dozens of men and staging a show trial for "blasphemy" as well as "debauchery." Long later wrote:

On the night of May 11, 2001, as I worked late in my office in New York, my inbox began filling with e-mails from [an] anonymous man, whose roommate had been seized in the discotheque raid. His messages spread news of the arrests around the world.

Long went to Egypt for the first time to attend and report on their trial. In succeeding months, hundreds, possibly thousands of other men were arrested in raids and through Internet entrapment. Working for Human Rights Watch, Long lived in Egypt for several months in 2003 documenting the extent of this crackdown. Through Human Rights Watch, he also documented a brutal government assault on anti-war activists, Islamists, and the political Left, as well as persecution of African refugees and other vulnerable groups. In all this, Long worked closely with Egyptian human rights organizations, including the Egyptian Initiative for Personal Rights, the El Nadeem Center for Psychological Management and Rehabilitation of Victims of Violence, and the Hisham Mubarak Law Center. The bridges he built helped persuade parts of Egypt's human rights community to take lesbian and gay issues within their work.

In 2004 in Cairo, together with Human Rights Watch executive director Kenneth Roth, Long launched a report on the Egyptian crackdown against gays. In Cairo, Long and Roth met with Egyptian officials including the country's Prosecutor General and deputy Minister of Interior. Human Rights Watch later stated:

Perhaps [Long's] most significant achievement was working cooperatively with Egypt's human rights community to develop a strong and unified response to the crackdowns. In the end, five major Egyptian human rights groups joined Long and Human Rights Watch in announcing and carrying out advocacy based on the documented abuse, making clear their conviction that sexual rights claims were core human rights concerns--a position still atypical at the time.

The New York Times praised the strategic way Long framed his advocacy:

Human Rights Watch avoided laying itself open to easy attack as the bearer of an outsider's agenda, [instead] packaging Queen Boat advocacy in the larger context of torture. … In Human Rights Watch's 150-page report on the crackdown, references to religion, homosexual rights or anything else that could be seen or used as code for licentiousness were played down. Torture was played up, and it may very well be the first and last human rights report to cite Michel Foucault's "History of Sexuality."

The crackdown and the arrests in Egypt abruptly stopped, apparently on the day of the release of Long's report. There were almost no arrests under Egypt's "debauchery" law for the next nine years. The Times observed,

[T]he all-out campaign of arrest and entrapment of men that began with the Queen Boat incident came to an end. One well-connected lawyer noted that a high-ranking Ministry of Interior source told him, "It is the end of the gay cases in Egypt, because of the activities of some human rights organizations."

Speaking to the Times, Long "reflected on his advocacy methods in a context in which human rights, and especially gay rights, are increasingly associated with Western empire-building":

Perhaps we had less publicity for the report in the United States because we avoided fetishizing beautiful brown men in Egypt being denied the right to love … We wrote for an Egyptian audience and tried to make this intelligible in terms of the human rights issues that have been central in Egyptian campaigns. It may not have made headlines, but it seemed to make history.

Long's work on Egypt also focused on the medicalization of sexuality, including the practice of inflicting spurious forensic anal examinations on suspected gay men to "prove" their guilt. Long had already documented this practice in Romania. He wrote and advocated extensively against the exams, arguing that they constituted torture.

Human Rights Watch established its Lesbian, Gay, Bisexual, and Transgender Rights Program in 2004, with Long as director. Bruce Rabb, a member of HRW's governing board, remembered that when Long spoke to the board, "The depth of Scott's knowledge and the passion he had for his work, combined with the dramatic effectiveness of his research and advocacy in Egypt, made it clear to all present that, while setting up an LGBT program would break significant new ground for Human Rights Watch, Scott's program would be core to Human Rights Watch's mission and definitely should be undertaken."

=== Moral panics ===
After his time in Egypt, Long's work increasingly explored how governments (and forces bidding for political power) exploit fears around sexuality and gender to create massive moral panics. This kind of cultural backlash, Long argued, endangers not just LGBTQ people but human rights in general. In an influential 2005 essay on "Sexuality and the 'Cultural' War on Human Rights," he wrote:

A spectre is stalking the arenas where human rights activists work. ...The forces in question define themselves most often by what they claim to defend—and that shifts from time to time and territory to territory: "culture," "tradition," "values," or "religion." What they share is a common target: sexual rights and sexual freedoms. These are most often represented by women's reproductive rights, the assault on which continues. The most vividly drawn and violently reviled enemy typically is homosexuality. "Gay and lesbian rights," the dignity of people with different desires, the basic principle of non-discrimination based on sexual orientation: all these are painted as incompatible with fundamental values, even with humanity itself. The target is chosen with passion, but also precision and care. Movements for the rights of lesbian, gay, bisexual, or transgender people, along with movements that assert sexual rights more generally, are arguably the most vulnerable edge of the human rights movement. In country after country they are easy to defame and discredit. But the attack on them also opens space for attacking human rights principles themselves—as not universal but "foreign," as not protectors of diversity but threats to sovereignty, and as carriers of cultural perversion.

Long concluded:

Cultures are made up of faces. They are not monoliths; they are composed of diverse individuals, each contributing to and minutely changing what the culture means and does. When a culture is reinvented for ideological purposes as a faceless, seamless whole—incapable of dissent from within, so that any dissenter automatically becomes an outsider; incapable of changing, so that growth seems like destruction—it has ceased to be an environment in which people can live and interpret their lives. … The role of human rights principles, unquestionably, is to mark out spaces of personal freedom, to affirm areas where individual privacy and dignity and autonomy should prevail against state or community regulation. But human rights principles also defend communities…. They ensure diversity both among communities and cultures, and within them. Rights work does not promise utopia, only an endless process of protecting basic human values against constantly renewing threats. But it also does not promise the dissolution of cultures or the annihilation of traditions. It helps to ensure that they remain responsive to the human beings they contain.

=== Jamaica ===
Later in 2004, Long worked to launch a Human Rights Watch report on homophobic violence and HIV/AIDS in Jamaica. The report stimulated an intense debate in Jamaica and across the Caribbean over homosexuality and the region's colonial-era sodomy laws, a furious controversy which continued into the next decade. Editorials condemning Jamaica's anti-gay policies appeared in publications such as The New York Times and The Economist, and filled the Jamaican press as well. For the first time the government suggested a willingness to modify its repressive legislation on consensual sexual acts. Long continued to cast a spotlight on abuses in Jamaica during the following years, and to demand government action against them. "Gays and lesbians in Jamaica face violence at home, in public, even in a house of worship, and official silence encourages the spread of hate," he said in 2008. "What stands out about Jamaica is how absolutely, head-in-the-sand unwilling the authorities have been for years to acknowledge or address homophobic violence," he commented in 2009.

=== Eastern Europe ===
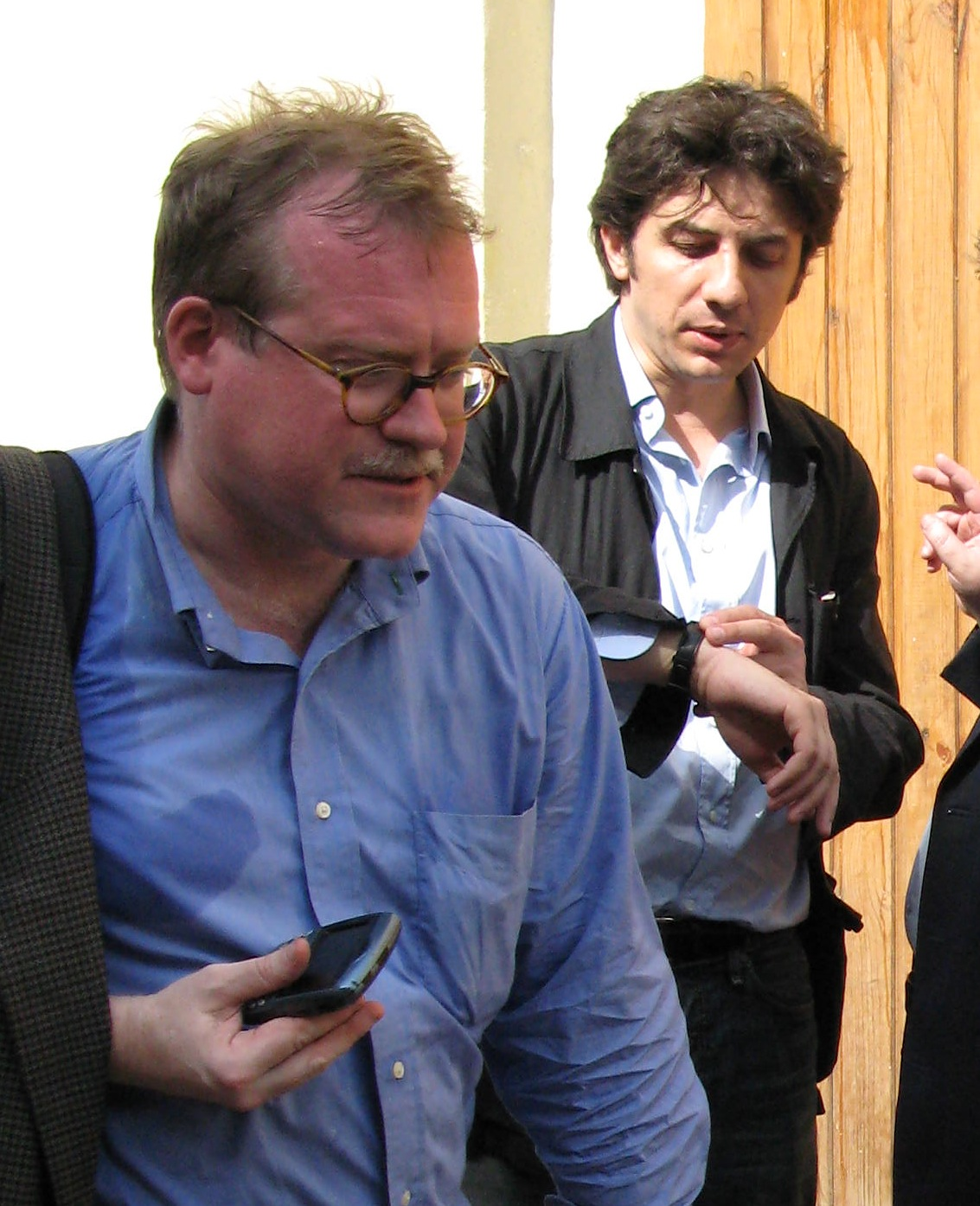
Scott Long outside Tverskoia police station, central Moscow, May 27, 2007

In the mid-2000s, Eastern Europe saw a backlash against LGBTQ rights. Long cited the evidence of an "unexpected Europe" rolling back the post-1989 democratic advances: "faces bleeding, people running, the air streaked with tear-gas trails. These photographs have burst forth every spring and summer for several years, as LGBT groups try to stage pride marches in Kraków, Chișinău, Moscow." Bans on LGBTQ pride marches, he wrote, "became a way of defining who belonged in the public sphere, who could participate in politics at all."

Long campaigned against attacks on pride marches from Latvia to Moldova. Human Rights Watch opposed the homophobic policies of President Lech Kaczynski's right-wing government in Poland. "As mayor of Warsaw, President Kaczynski opposed the right of lesbian and gay people to basic freedoms and equal respect," Long said. "As president, he will determine whether Poland protects rights or chips away at them." He supported pride activists in Poland against government attacks. Human Rights Watch also campaigned against the Kaczynski government's attempts to curtail free speech on LGBTQ issues.

Long went to Moscow in 2006 to support Russian activists, including Nikolay Alexeyev, attempting to organize a gay pride march in defiance of an official ban. The ban was part of a general strangling of civil society as President Vladimir Putin's regime became more authoritarian. Long witnessed and reported on skinhead and police violence against marchers, including a brutal attack on German member of the Bundestag Volker Beck. Long documented collusion between police and violent right-wing extremists, and "evidence that the police lured the lesbian and gay activists... to be beaten, then selectively jailed." He wrote of his own experience at the abortive march:

All of a sudden the OMON police were there too. Instead of trying to separate skinheads and gays, though, they surrounded all of us in a double line, constricting the circle and shoving the crowd tightly together so that we were jammed up against each other—for maximum damage. The crush was paralyzing – I could barely breathe. The extremists were delivering body blows to people around me right and left. ... Finally the circle opened enough for most of us inside to escape. Various other people were arrested outside the circle. Yevgeniya Debryanskaya, one of the founders of the lesbian movement in Russia, was giving a media interview nearby. Police seized her and a friend and bundled her into the police van.

Long again documented violence and police arrests at Moscow Pride 2007, where he was briefly detained. He wrote a report on those abuses, co-published by Human Rights Watch and the International Lesbian and Gay Association - Europe.

=== Sub-Saharan Africa ===
Long continued to work with and support LGBTQ activists in Africa. During his tenure, Human Rights Watch embarked on in-depth investigations of punitive rapes of black lesbians and transgender men in South Africa; arrests of LGBTQ people in Cameroon; and the impact of Senegal's sodomy law. Long cooperated closely with activists in Nigeria in opposing the "Same Sex Marriage (Prohibition) Act" introduced in 2006, which would have punished displays of same-sex affection as well as any public statements in support of LGBTQ people's freedoms. Human Rights Watch's advocacy helped ensure the bill failed in several legislative sessions, though a version became law many years later, in 2014. Long repeatedly stressed that state-sponsored homophobia and repressive laws against LGBTQ people in Africa should not be seen in isolation, but as part of broader government campaigns against civil society. "If the national assembly can strip one group of its freedoms, then the liberties of all Nigerians are at risk," he said.

Long also campaigned for years against homophobic policies in Uganda. He traced connections between discrimination in Uganda and Bush administration-era policies in the U.S., arguing in 2007 that "When the U.S. funds abstinence-only programmes in Uganda, it tells people that LGBT people's sexualities are dangerous and must be denied." Long and Human Rights Watch also documented how U.S. anti-HIV/AIDS funding had been funneled to groups actively promoting homophobia in Uganda. Long's efforts drew the direct ire not only of the Ugandan government but of notoriously homophobic preacher Martin Ssempa. Long helped coordinate international responses to the draconian Anti-Homosexuality Bill after it was introduced in 2009, working to ensure that international groups took their guidance from domestic Ugandan advocates. The bill "is clearly an attempt to divide and weaken civil society by striking at one of its most marginalized groups," he said; "the government may be starting here, but who will be next?" In an interview shortly after the bill's appearance, Long explained its origins in the politics of moral panic:

[T]he preparation for it has been laid by years of fanatical homophobic agitation in Uganda that comes from the president and comes from the first lady and comes from ... the minister of ethics and integrity, James Nsaba Buturo ... Uganda has gone through 25 or 30 years of civil war. You can stand in Kampala and it looks like a beautiful, placid, just lovely place, and then you remember what's happened to many of the people walking by you on the street in the last two decades, and you remember the civil war that's still raging in the north, and you realize how much fear there is underneath the surface. And I think the Museveni government has been actually very clever at focusing all of people's anxieties on homosexuality as ... the universal target and the universal scapegoat.

Long added, though, that

The preamble to the bill was, I think, pretty clearly written by U.S. evangelicals or folks who are connected with U.S. evangelicals. We know that [U.S. evangelicals were] doing evangelical missions to Uganda earlier this year and raising the red flag about homosexuality. We know, moreover, that PEPFAR, the President's Emergency Plan For AIDS Relief, under the Bush administration was not only funding evangelical, homophobic, Christian -- and in some cases Muslim -- movements in Uganda, but they were also funding U.S. evangelical churches to go over to Uganda ... So the U.S. under the previous administration was implicated in this up to its elbows and U.S. right-wing churches are in this up to their elbows. And they're targeting Africa, not just Uganda. ... And that's one reason why the Uganda bill is so alarming. It's not just what it represents for Uganda, where things are bad already, it's that it represents a foothold by these forces inside Africa ... in creating new legal prohibitions on sexual autonomy, on homosexuality, and using homosexuality as a wedge issue to establish their own power.

=== Other work ===
In 2006, Long was the main author of a report on binational same-sex couples and the discrimination they face in U.S. immigration law, amid a fierce religious and social backlash against recognition of same-sex relationships in the United States. Long also wrote a survey of the strategies, priorities, and needs of grassroots sexual-rights activism around the globe, and together with Indian activist Alok Gupta a history of the colonial origins of sodomy laws around the world.

Under Long's leadership, Human Rights Watch also documented discrimination and violence against LGBTQ people in Iran; violence against lesbians and transgender men in Kyrgyzstan; violence and discrimination against LGBTQ people in Turkey; killings and abuses of transgender people in Honduras; and moral panics over gender in Kuwait and the Gulf states, and their human rights consequences. In 2010, Susana T. Fried of the United Nations Development Programme (UNDP) said, "Compared to a decade ago, many more governments and international organizations recognize the rights and lives of LGBT people as their legitimate concern ... Scott has made innumerable contributions to this change, and his leadership has been vital."

== Yogyakarta Principles ==
Long played a key role in developing the Yogyakarta Principles, an influential set of guidelines on how human rights law applies to issues of sexual orientation and gender identity. Long helped conceive the principles' scope and shape, and served on a secretariat that drafted an initial version for the 16 experts who debated and finalized them. He also attended the final experts' meeting in Yogyakarta, Indonesia, in November 2006. The principles have been a crucial tool for local activists in lobbying governments, and an important "soft law" way to expand international protections for LGBTQ people.

== "Underground railroad" from Iraq ==
In early 2009, Iraqi militias in Baghdad and elsewhere began a massive campaign of brutal murders, targeting men suspected of homosexual conduct. Reports that emerged from Iraq were initially confused and contradictory, until Long and Human Rights Watch went to Iraq to find the facts behind the stories of lethal violence, and – in a unique project – to help as many men as possible escape. According to New York magazine,

Since February, Long had been hearing from foreign rights groups about a wave of anti-gay violence in Iraq, but so far the accounts were unsubstantiated. On April 1, one of Long's colleagues, Rasha Moumneh, was the first person from the organization to be put in touch with a gay Iraqi. … He related what had happened to him and said that he had heard rumors of similar attacks on other gay men. He said the situation was dire. HRW typically investigates human-rights abuses and publishes reports intended to spotlight problems, but the group rarely intervenes directly in a situation. In this case, however, Long decided that if [the man] were left in Iraq, he, and probably many more men like him, could be killed.

Long and Moumneh formulated a plan. They would build an underground railroad of sorts, reaching out to gay men in Iraq through the Internet and their existing contacts in Iraq, then advising and supporting gay Iraqis until they could ferry them to a safe city somewhere in Iraq, then to a haven elsewhere in the region, and eventually perhaps to the West.

On Monday, April 6, Long and his colleagues began posting warnings and requests for information on the 1,100 Iraqi ads on Manjam, an international gay personals site. Over the next two weeks, more than 50 men replied to the HRW notices. ... On the morning of April 7, Long's phone rang. The young man on the other end of the line was sobbing. …. The man's name was Fadi. Two of his friends had just been murdered. He had been threatened earlier in the day, with a letter written in blood. He was sure he would be killed soon.

As the stories multiplied, Long and his colleagues travelled to Iraq, arranging for the transit of several dozen men out of the country through a northern Iraqi city.

Long and Moumneh spent two weeks in the Iraqi city. As men arrived from Baghdad and elsewhere in the country, the two aid workers helped them get settled, interviewed them to verify their stories, made arrangements for travel to the safe city in the nearby country, and set up places for them to stay once they got there. At first, Long and Moumneh didn't introduce the men to each another so that they wouldn't attract any more attention than necessary from local security officials, especially since a number of the men were staying in the same hotel. … For the most part, the Iraqi city was a way station, and the men spent their days waiting. Long and Moumneh provided them with living expenses, and took them to a local site or two, but mainly encouraged them to stay indoors and avoid scrutiny.

In addition to assisting numerous men to flee the violence to safer countries, Long researched a detailed report on the pattern of death-squad killings, placing main responsibility squarely on Moqtada al-Sadr's Mahdi Army, which hoped to use a moral panic to reassert its relevance amid the US "surge" in Iraq. Human Rights Watch estimated that hundreds of men may have been murdered, though the tide of killings appeared to recede after the report's release.

In a later interview, Long spoke about the relation between individual stories and the "traditional" HRW focus on large-scale, systemic change, using the lessons of the Iraq "underground railroad":

In this program at Human Rights Watch we do a lot more work with individuals than any other part of Human Rights Watch does. For the most part, Human Rights Watch focuses on the big picture. We look at patterns of violations and policy recommendations to fix them. And I think that's very important in dealing with LGBT rights, partly because we get told so often that these abuses are sporadic or unsystematic or accidental or they just don't happen, you know? I think being able to demonstrate: "No, there is a syndrome, there is a pattern, these are serious, they happen to a lot people" -- it's critical for getting attention paid to them.

But the fact is that in most countries in the world, still, things that happen to queer folks are shrouded in secrecy and stigma and shame ... It requires much more effort for us to find the stories and to find people who are willing to talk to us and to find people to whom this has happened. And because of that, we need to pay attention to the individual abuses because they are often our only key to finding out what the larger pattern is. It's only by grabbing that single thread that we can untangle the whole carpet of abuses that people are facing.

So, I make it very much our policy here that when we have somebody come to us with an individual story ... we should always try to answer and figure out what we can do, because ... if we hadn't done that in Iraq we would never have found out the scope of what was going on there... It's really critical.

He added:

My basic philosophy is that every case is an impact case, that every case in some incremental fashion -- every success, every life saved, every person got out of immediate danger, every person who's freed from the threat of jail -- advances that larger process of change in some fashion....You are going to be dealing with the one person whose story opens up the stories of 10, 20, 100, 1,000 others. My feeling is always that by getting that individual's story out, you can illuminate the lives of others and help them, but if you can't do something for that one person, then you're not ultimately going to be able to do much effectively for the 1,000, the 10,000, the million.

Long continued to work in support of Iraqis' rights and lives for many years. In 2012, when a new wave of death-squad killings erupted in Baghdad, Long—by then a fellow at Harvard Law School—demonstrated that the attack grew from a state-promoted moral panic over "emos" allegedly corrupting Iraqi youth. Long produced evidence that security forces were implicated in the killings, and showed how other victims, such as men seen as "effeminate" or gay, were being swept up in the murders as well. Long personally posted warnings in Arabic on more than 500 Iraqis' personals sites and ads with advice about safety. Long's research was cited in The New York Times. Long has also written on Iraq for publications including the Guardian and Jadaliyya.

== Controversies ==
The Middle East expert and academic Joseph Massad has repeatedly criticized Long as an example of what Massad calls the "Gay International," a complex of Western organizations, activists and academics that has embarked on a project "to universalize itself ... [b]y inciting discourse about homosexuals where none existed before." Massad accuses the Gay International of actually worsening the situation for the people it claims to help, by aggressively imposing its identity categories of "homosexual" and "heterosexual" upon "a world that is being forced to be fixed by a Western binary." Massad contends that the Gay International's missionary activities have especially targeted the Arab and Muslim worlds, and Long has been a key agent, one who was "rewarded with employment at Human Rights Watch" and who "became an instant expert speaking on 'gays' in Arab countries on radio shows and at public lectures."

Paradoxically, Long was also criticized from the opposite perspective. Other campaigners, especially the British activist Peter Tatchell, attacked him for questioning the universal validity of "gay" identity. Long's work produced controversy in 2005 and 2006 after photographs of the hanging of two teenagers in the city of Mashhad, Iran went viral on the web. Tatchell, gay writer Doug Ireland, and U.S. activist Michael Petrelis insisted that the youths were hanged not for the rape of a 13-year-old (as initially reported in the Iranian press) but for being gay. Long and Human Rights Watch, while conducting intensive research on the situation for LGBTQ people in Iran, maintained the evidence in the Mashhad case was inconclusive, and also questioned assigning the youths a Western "gay" identity in a culturally complex situation where neither they nor others around them were able to speak for themselves. Long urged that the executions should be condemned, but that it was not necessary to believe the youths were either "gay" or completely innocent to do so. "Rights aren't for saints, and if we only defend them for people onto whom we can project our own qualities, our own identities, we aren't activists but narcissists with attitude," he said. "If these kids aren't 'gay,' or 'innocent,' but are 'straight' or 'guilty,' does it make their fear less horrible, their suffering less real? Does it make them less dead?" Long was attacked for a social constructionist approach to LGBTQ activism. Some, including Tatchell, questioned whether his work reflected covertly pro-Islamic sympathies.

In 2009, Long wrote an article, published in the Routledge journal Contemporary Politics, on Mahmoud Asgari and Ayaz Marhoni which sharply criticized the accuracy of claims Tatchell and OutRage! had made about Iran. Peter Tatchell wrote to Human Rights Watch in 2010, and Kenneth Roth and Long issued an apology in June 2010. Taylor & Francis issued an apology in 2012 declaring there were "substantial innaccuracies" in the essay.

The article had been widely praised; Dianne Otto, a professor of international law, called it "meticulous genealogy of some western LGBTI advocacy of sexuality rights in Iran." Long asserted that Tatchell intimidated HRW and Taylor & Francis with legal threats under English defamation law, while Tatchell claims he never made any legal threats against Human Rights Watch, and that Taylor & Francis only retracted the paper because it had claims that were unsubstantiated. Tatchell has been accused of intimidating or harassing other critics with threats of action under England's libel laws, at the time some of the most restrictive in the world. In 2009, Tatchell had induced a small UK feminist publisher to withdraw an anthology that contained an article critical of him, and to publish an extensive apology. In an open letter published in February 2016, 165 activists and academics cited the withdrawal of Long's article as well as other incidents and accused Tatchell of "intolerance of criticism and disrespect for others' free expression."

== Later activism ==
Long suffered severe pulmonary embolisms in July 2010. He wrote, "While running to catch a bus on a New York street, I saw a blinding effusion of white light, amid which several spangled and bell-bottomed figures vaguely resembling ABBA beckoned me to an eternal disco complete with spinning ball. Yanked back from their blandishments by a superior fashion sense, I spent a couple of weeks in intensive care." Long resigned from Human Rights Watch the following month in order to recuperate. In his resignation letter, published in English and Spanish, he recollected that

One of the most basic splits in contemporary human rights work – sometimes mapped onto a division between "global South" and "global North," though not quite reducible to it – is between rights as a set of legal norms, and rights as a complex of human dreams and political aspirations. The split has to do, as well, with the difference between institutions and movements, the former ones formal and developing their own standards and needs, the latter fluid and chaotic and responsible to individuals' and communities' desires and drives … Human Rights Watch – and other international organizations like it – needs a far deeper understanding of what social movements are, why they are important, how they turn human rights into living values rather than legal abstractions.

In fall 2010, Long was a senior fellow at the Center for Gender and Sexuality Law at Columbia University Law School. From January 2011 - September 2012, he was a visiting fellow at the Human Rights Program at Harvard Law School.

In late 2012, Long moved to Cairo, Egypt. The New York Times reported that he was "researching a book about sexual politics." Although for nine years Egypt's law against "debauchery" had almost never been enforced, after the July 2013 military coup that brought General Abdel Fattah el-Sisi to power, a new crackdown on LGBTQ people began. More than 150 people were arrested in the next 18 months. Long documented the arrests from the start, interviewing as many as possible of the victims and publicizing many accounts on his blog, A Paper Bird. He stressed the role of gender (rather than sexual orientation) in the persecution, and the way that transgender women and "effeminate" men were especially targeted for arrest. Long worked on a legal guide for endangered LGBTQ Egyptians that was published, in Arabic, on his blog. He also published warnings, in both English and Arabic, about Internet entrapment and surveillance in Egypt and how to protect online privacy.

Long helped organize several social media campaigns in Egypt to mobilize opposition to the crackdown. In December 2014, he was the first to break the news of a police raid on a Cairo bathhouse led by prominent journalist Mona Iraqi. 26 men were arrested and charged with "debauchery" in the most high-profile gay trial since the Queen Boat. The shocking pictures of the raid Long published galvanized indignation at the arrests, both inside Egypt and beyond. Partly as a result a court eventually acquitted all the men, a victory highly unusual under the draconian Sisi regime. Long was interviewed extensively by publications such as The New York Times, the Guardian, BuzzFeed, and Global Post, as well as in the Egyptian media. He also wrote about the human rights crisis in Egypt in such venues as the Irish Times and the Advocate.

In April 2015, Long made a rare comment on the level of personal danger he felt:

I sometimes seem insouciant about threats in Egypt, but I'm not. It's just that the atmosphere of threat is general here. It affects every corner of your personality, yet it's hard to take it personally, so wide is the danger spread. ... Yesterday, talking with a reporter in the usual seedy Cairo café — a place I've always considered safe — I saw a well-dressed man at the next table listening intently. Finally he interrupted. He gathered I was interested in human rights, he said. What did I do? Did I work for Freedom House? Freedom House is, of course, a banned organization, its local office raided and shuttered by the military regime back in 2011. I said no. He added, almost enticingly, that he himself had been tortured, and offered to show me his scars. I gave him my contact information and told him to call me. That was simple responsibility – you do not refuse a torture victim anything you can give; but afterwards I cringed inside. It's how things are in Egypt. Other people, foreign passport-holders among them, have been arrested for "political" conversations in public places. You don't know if the person who approaches you is victim or violator, survivor of torture or State Security agent; or both.

== Awards ==
In June 1997, Long received an Achievement Award from nine Hungarian lesbian, gay, bisexual, and transgender organizations, "in recognition of years of work in building and strengthening the Hungarian LGBT community and the cause of LGBT human rights."

In 2010, Long received the Lifetime Achievement Award presented by the Harvard Lambda Law Association, an "Annual award given to someone whose life's work has significantly advanced the human and civil rights of LGBT people."

In 2007, Long and Human Rights Watch received the Global Justice Award of the Worldwide Fellowship of the Metropolitan Community Churches, in recognition of "groundbreaking work defending LGBT people worldwide from violence, discrimination, and abuse."

== See also ==
- LGBT rights by country or territory
