= Judith Chapman =

American actress

- Born: Judith Shepard; Greenville, South Carolina, U.S.
- Education: Stephens College
- Occupation: Actress
- Years active: 1967–present
- Known for: The Young and the Restless; Days of Our Lives; General Hospital; Ryan's Hope

Judith Chapman (born Judith Shepard) is an American actress, best known for soap opera roles, particularly as Natalie Bannon Hughes in As the World Turns (1975–1978), Charlotte Greer on Ryan's Hope (1983), Ginny Blake Webber on General Hospital (1984–1986), Sandra Montaigne on One Life to Live (1987), Anjelica Deveraux on Days of Our Lives (1989–1991, 2018), and Gloria Abbott Bardwell on The Young and the Restless (2005–2018, 2020–2023).

== Life and career ==
Chapman was born in Greenville, South Carolina. She is the daughter of retired United States Air Force brigadier general Leland C. Shepard Jr. Her older sister Patty Shepard also worked as an actress. She debuted at the age of 16 in the Spaghetti Western, Up the MacGregors! . After getting a degree in theater from Stephens College, she headed to New York, where she joined the Actors Studio and began working in commercials and theater. In 1977, she made her American big screen debut in the psychological horror film False Face.

Chapman has appeared on several daytime dramas since the mid-1970s. Her first soap role was scheming Natalie Bannon (one of Tom Hughes' wives) on CBS soap As the World Turns from 1975 to 1978. She guest-starred on prime time series include Kojak , Fantasy Island, Barnaby Jones, The Incredible Hulk, Galactica 1980, The Love Boat, and two times on Magnum, P.I.. She had a recurring roles on Flamingo Road and The Fall Guy. In 1977, she tested for the role of Pam Ewing on CBS primetime soap opera, Dallas.

A four-month stint as the mysterious Charlotte Greer on Ryan's Hope in 1983 brought Chapman critical acclaim. Her role had her character as part of a revenge plot against the Ryan family after lying to the press that she was Frank Ryan's ex-wife. She joined the cast of General Hospital the following year as the devious Ginny Blake who was the biological mother of Mike Webber, adopted by Rick and Lesley. After Lesley's "death", Rick and Ginny married in an attempt to share custody and fell in love after Ginny was found to be the killer of D.L. Brock. She received Soap Opera Digest Award for Outstanding Lead Actress in a Daytime Drama nomination for her performance. After that stint ended, she had a brief role on One Life to Live as Sandra Montaigne, a con-artist out to scam ex-boyfriend Jonathan Russell. She was the third former General Hospital actress to play the role of Anjelica Devereaux Curtis on Days of Our Lives, playing that part from 1989 to 1990 and briefly in 1991.

Chapman had supporting roles in films And God Created Woman (1988), Dead Space (1991), Fire on the Amazon (1993), Night of the Running Man (1995), 28 Days (2000), and The Sweetest Thing (2002). She appeared in three episodes of Murder, She Wrote, and five times on Silk Stalkings as different characters. She starred in the LGBT comedy film Saugatuck Cures (2015), and in 2021 played Nancy Reagan in the biographical drama King Richard.

Chapman made her first appearance on The Young and the Restless after that, briefly subbing for Jess Walton as Jill Abbott. She joined the cast of The Young and the Restless full-time in January 2005, replacing Joan Van Ark in the contract role of Gloria Fisher. In March 2011, it was announced that Chapman had been taken off her contract and bumped to recurring. In October 2014, it was announced that she would make a guest appearance as Gloria on The Bold and the Beautiful. She appeared in a few more episodes of The Young and the Restless in 2015 and 2016. She played Diana Cooper on Days of Our Lives for two months in 2019, then returned to Y&R.

== Filmography ==
=== Film ===
Year	Title	Role	Notes
1967	Up the MacGregors!	Dundalks Donovan	
1977	Scalpel	Heather/Jane	aka False Face
1981	Inmates: A Love Story	Leslie	
1981	The Five of Me	Sally	
1982	Desire	Julie Seaver	
1982	Farrell for the People	Victoria Walton-Mason	Television film
1983	Return of the Man from U.N.C.L.E.	Z-65	Television film
1988	And God Created Woman	Alexandra	
1989	Chameleons	Lainie Roberts	
1991	Dead Space	Dr. Emily Stote	
1993	Fire on the Amazon	Sandra	
1994	Night of the Running Man	Roz Chambers	
1994	Mortal Fear	Helen Brennquist	Television film
1998	Scorpio One	Gibson	
2000	28 Days	Deirdre	
2002	The Sweetest Thing	Judy's Mother	
2013	Liz & Dick	BelasAir Socialite	Television film
2015	Saugatuck Cures	Maggie Callaghan	
2021	King Richard	Nancy Reagan	

== Television ==
- As the World Turns (1975–1978) as Natalie Bannon Hughes
- Kojak (1976) as Gretchen Hodges
- Barnaby Jones (1978) as Rita Lockwood
- Fantasy Island (1978) as Evelyn Wallace
- The Paper Chase (1979) as Amelia Hutton
- B. J. and the Bear (1980) as Pamela Gerard
- Beyond Westworld (1980) as Laura Garvey (Pilot episode only)
- Buck Rogers in the 25th Century (1980) as Lara Teasian
- Galactica 1980 (1980) as Angela
- Family (1980) as Jo Hamlin
- The Incredible Hulk (1980) as Nancy
- Fitz and Bones (1981) as Clementine
- Magnum, P.I. (1981) as Lisa Page/Sara Clifford / Louise DeBolt Jackson (2 episodes)
- The Love Boat (1981) as Nancy Atwell
- The Fall Guy (1981–1983) as Kay Faulkner (4 episodes)
- Darkroom (1982) as Pamela
- Knight Rider (1982) as Linda Elliot
- Return of the Man from U.N.C.L.E. (1983) as Technical Agent Z
- Ryan's Hope (1983) as Charlotte
- Simon & Simon (1983) as Denise Carroll
- Trapper John, M.D. (1983) as Robin Yaeger
- General Hospital (1984–1986) as Ginny Blake Webber
- One Life to Live (1987) as Sandra Montaigne
- Highway To Heaven (1987) as Gail
- Stingray (1987) as Carla
- Murder, She Wrote (1987–1992) (3 episodes)
- MacGyver (1988) as Dr. Sandra Millhouse
- In the Heat of the Night (1989) as Charlotte Sinclair
- The Accident (1991) as Miss Radovich
- Days of Our Lives as Anjelica Deveraux (1989–1991, 2018) and Diana Colville (2019, 2024)
- Silk Stalkings (1996) as Marcia Travers
- The Young and the Restless (2005–2018, 2020–2023) as Gloria Abbott Bardwell
- The Bold and the Beautiful (2014) as Gloria Abbott Bardwell (Episode date: November 20, 2014)
