= Andrew Sugerman =

American film producer

- Born: Morristown, New Jersey, United States
- Occupation: Producer

Andrew Sugerman is an American film producer. He attended the University of Rochester and subsequently the NYU – Tisch School of the Arts. Sugerman began his career in television commercials and educational films in New York, then moved to Los Angeles to work in film and television.

== Career ==
Andrew Barry Sugerman has been a producer over the past thirty years. His production, Conviction, was released in October 2010 by Fox Searchlight.

He co-produced The Goat, and produced You Are My Home, starring Alyssa Milano, Angel Parker, and Cristián de la Fuente. Released in 2020, he executive produced Home, starring Jake McLaughlin, Kathy Bates, Stephen Root, Lil Rel Howery, and Aisling Franciosi, as well as Wild Daze, a documentary about elephant poaching. He also produced the films Foster Boy, Any Day, the boxing drama Undisputed, and the comedy Boat Trip.

Sugerman was co-executive producer of the one-hour drama series, The Divide, for AMC Studios and WEtv, which premiered in July, 2014.

He executive produced the 2011 release, Judy Moody and the Not Bummer Summer, the 2013 film Crazy Kind of Love, Death Sentence, the thriller Premonition, Shopgirl, Grilled and Love Kills.

He served as line producer on the caper comedy The Whole Ten Yards, which followed the action-thriller Ballistic: Ecks vs. Sever. He also line produced the drama Prozac Nation, based on the Elizabeth Wurtzel novel, The Prophet's Game, Kimberly, The Sterling Chase, Michael Angel starring Dennis Hopper and Richard Greico, Blue Motel, starring Sean Young, Soleil Moon Frye and Robert Vaughn; and Spiders starring Lana Perillo and Josh Green.

As a producer and executive producer, Sugerman's credits also include McCinsey's Island, Mercy Street, Somebody Is Waiting, Savate, Spilt Milk and Deadly Rivals. Sugerman shared the writing credit for the story of the NBC Family Special, A Place at the Table, and he directed the feature film comedy Basic Training, starring Ann Dusenberry and Marty Brill.

His television credits include producing the movie thriller, Payoff, the feature comedy Working Trash, the special The Bulkin Trail, and producing and directing The Hayburners. He also produced and directed Mandy's Grandmother, which was released theatrically and was nominated for an Academy Award.

== Filmography ==
=== Films ===
- The Goat Co-Producer (2023)
- Wild Daze Executive Producer (2021)
- You Are My Home Producer (2020)
- Home Executive Producer (2020)
- Wild Daze Executive Producer (2020)
- Foster Boy Producer (2019)
- Any Day Producer (2015)
- Crazy Kind of Love Executive Producer (2012)
- Judy Moody and the Not Bummer Summer Executive Producer (2011)
- Long Time Gone Executive Producer (2011)
- Conviction Producer (2009)
- Death Sentence Executive Producer.(2006)
- Premonition Executive Producer.(2006)
- Grilled Executive Producer (2005)
- Shopgirl Executive Producer (2004)
- Johnson Family Vacation Executive Producer (2003)
- The Whole Ten Yards Line Producer (2003)
- Ballistic: Ecks vs. Sever Line Producer (2002)
- Boat Trip Producer (2002)
- Undisputed Producer (2001)
- Prozac Nation Line Producer (2000)
- Spiders Line Producer (1999)
- The Prophet's Game Line Producer (1999)
- Kimberly Line Producer (1998)
- The Sterling Chase Line Producer (1998)
- The Apostate' Line Producer (1998)
- Love Kills Executive Producer (1998)
- Blue Motel Line Producer (1997)
- McCinsey's Island Supervising Producer / Line Producer (1997)
- Mercy Street Executive Producer (1997)
- Somebody is Waiting Consulting Producer (1996)
- Savate Supervising Producer (1994)
- Spilt Milk Producer (1995)
- Deadly Rivals Executive Producer (1993)
- Payoff Producer (1993)
- Working Trash Producer (1990)
- In Gold We Trust Finance Executive (1989)
- Basic Training: Director.(1985)

=== Television ===
- The Divide (TV Series) Executive Producer (2014- )
- The Bulkin Trail (television special): Executive Producer.(1992)
- Cash America (pilot): Executive Producer.(1990)
- The Hayburners (television special): Producer and Director. (1981)
- Mandy's Grandmother: Producer and Director (1980)
