= Matthew Ladensack =

American filmmaker (born 1987)

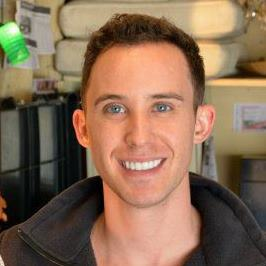
- Born: Matthew Alan Ladensack; March 11, 1987 (age 39); Phoenix, Arizona, U.S.
- Other name: Matthew Arnold-Ladensack
- Education: Chapman University, Dodge College of Film and Media Arts
- Occupations: Film director, film producer, screenwriter, entrepreneur
- Years active: 2009–present
- Spouse: Benjamin Arnold-Ladensack
- Website: http://www.matthewladensack.com

Matthew Arnold-Ladensack (born March 11, 1987) is an American film director, producer, screenwriter and entrepreneur.

== Early life and family ==
Ladensack was born in Phoenix, Arizona and has a twin sister. Ladensack attended Arizona State University's Herberger Institute for Design and the Arts, becoming the first accepted freshman into their new film school in 2006. At ASU Ladensack became the Executive Secretary of the relaunched Pi Kappa Phi fraternity. Ladensack transferred to Chapman University in Southern California to study Film Production, earning a BFA from Dodge College of Film and Media Arts. Ladensack currently lives in Amboy, Washington, just north of Portland, Oregon.

== Career ==
Ladensack interned and worked at DreamWorks, working under the leadership of Kristine Belson and Chris Sanders. He wrote, produced, directed and edited the short film "The Apple Tree" which played at more than 30 film festivals worldwide. His first feature film was the independently produced Saugatuck Cures (2015).

While attending Dodge College of Film and Media Arts at Chapman University Ladensack directed the short film "S.S. Humanity" which premiered at Cinerama Theater in Seattle at Seattle's Science Fiction + Fantasy Short Film Festival. After graduating Ladensack created his production company Humanity Pictures with friend Kiko Suura, a film company dedicated producing high-quality media entertainment that raises awareness socially, culturally and environmentally. In 2010 Ladensack directed the kooky, Pixar-esq short The Sprinkler which premiered at The Newport Beach Film Festival in 2006.

Upon graduating Ladensack moved to Los Angeles he began creating short films, directing music videos and writing short & feature screenplays under his production Humanity Pictures. Ladensack produced his first feature film Blood Type: Unknown which premiered at the Newport Beach Film Festival.

When living in Hollywood Ladensack became passionate about the aging LGBT community which lead to his next film The Apple Tree which won "Best Picture" at the Out In the Desert Film Festival and screened at over twenty film festivals internationally.

In 2013 Ladensack directed his first feature film Saugatuck Cures a comedy set in Saugatuck, Michigan, Ladensack was hired to produce and direct through Permoveo Productions and the film premiered across the nation at Cinema Diverse: Palm Springs, qFLIX Philadelphia and REELING Chicago.

Ladensack co-Founder and designer of CineScout a mobile iOS app that acts as a concierge service for filmmakers and photographers to search, find lock and pay for location spaces.

In 2016 Matthew and his husband moved from Los Angeles to the Portland area. They restored a 100+ year old farmhouse and built a new barn for their Clydesdale horses in order to start a boutique Clydesdale breeding facility.

== Awards and memberships ==
- Best Picture, "The Apple Tree" Out in the Desert Film Festival, Tucson
- Audience Award, Saugatuck Cures, Cinema Diverse Palm Springs

== Selected filmography ==
- "LA // 1:87" (short) (producer, director)
- Saugatuck Cures (feature) (2015) (producer, director)
- "D.P.I. Discount Paranormal Investigators" (TV Pilot) (producer, director, story by)
- Blood Type: Unknown (feature) (producer)
- "The Apple Tree" (short) (producer, director, screenplay)
- "The Sprinkler" (short) (director)
- "S.S. Humanity" (short) (producer, director, screenplay)
