= Patty Shepard =

American actress (1945–2013)

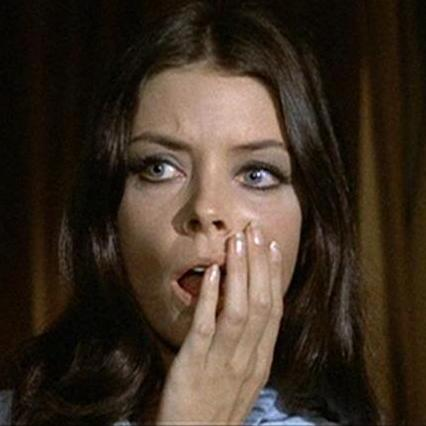
- Shepard on My Dear Killer (1972)
- Born: Patricia Moran Shepard; October 1, 1945; Greenville, South Carolina, U.S.
- Died: January 3, 2013 (aged 67); Madrid, Spain
- Occupation: Actress
- Years active: 1966–1988
- Spouse: Manuel de Blas (m. 1967)
- Father: Leland C. Shepard Jr.
- Relatives: Judith Chapman (sister)

Patricia Moran Shepard (October 1, 1945 – January 3, 2013) was an American actress, long based in Spain. She appeared in more than 50 films from the 1960s to the 1980s, notably several cult horror films.

== Early life ==
Shepard was born in Greenville, South Carolina, in 1945. Shepard first arrived in Spain with her father, Air Force Brigadier General Leland C. Shepard Jr., who was stationed at an airbase in Torrejón de Ardoz. She moved to Madrid in 1963 to pursue studies in philosophy. However, she soon began modeling and appearing in Spanish television commercials, including a campaign for a brand of brandy. The roles would lead to more serious acting parts and she remained in Spain for the rest of her life.

== Career ==
Her early television credits led to a small, debut film role in La ciudad no es para mí (The City is Not For Me) in 1966, which launched her film career. She appeared in more than fifty films in Spain and Italy over the next twenty years, before retiring in 1988.

Shepard played the vampire countess in the iconic 1970 Paul Naschy film, La Noche de Walpurgis (the film which is credited with kickstarting the entire Spanish horror film industry of the 1970s). She also played the lead role in Hannah, Queen of the Vampires (1973) and the 1972 giallo My Dear Killer. She returned briefly to the horror genre in 1987 with such films as Slugs and Edge of the Axe, then retired in 1988 at age 43.

== Personal life ==
Shepard married Spanish actor Manuel de Blas in 1967; the couple had met while filming the 1967 movie, Cita en Navarra (A Date in Navarra). They were still married 46 years later at the time of her death.

Her younger sister Judith Chapman is a television actress in the U.S. and had roles in Murder, She Wrote and The Young and the Restless.

=== Death ===
Shepard died from a heart attack at her home in Madrid on January 3, 2013, at the age of 67.

== Partial filmography ==
- La ciudad no es para mí (1966) - (uncredited)
- Ringo, the Mark of Vengeance (1966) - Chica del saloon
- Residencia para espías (1966) - Residence Girl (uncredited)
- Lucky, the Inscrutable (1967) - Telefonista (uncredited)
- The Fickle Finger of Fate (1967) - Pilar
- Cita en Navarra (1967) - Mary
- Cruzada en la mar (1968) - Mary
- Tinto con amor (1968)
- ¿Por qué te engaña tu marido? (1969) - Veronique
- Sharon vestida de rojo (1969) - Laura
- Carola de día, Carola de noche (1969) - Cuca
- Las panteras se comen a los ricos (1969) - Fanny
- Golpe de mano (Explosión) (1970) - Teresa
- Los Monstruos del Terror (1970) (with Paul Naschy) - Ilsa
- Un, dos, tres... al escondite inglés (1970) - Patty
- Veinte pasos para la muerte (1970) - Deborah
- Después de los nueve meses (1970) - Rosario
- Las siete vidas del gato (1971) - Lucía / Clotilde / Inés / Carlota / Mariana
- The Glass Ceiling (1971) - Julia
- The Werewolf vs. The Vampire Woman (aka Walpurgis Night, aka The Werewolf vs. The Vampire Woman, (1971) (with Paul Naschy) - Countess Wandesa Dárvula de Nadasdy
- A mí las mujeres, ni fu ni fa (1971) - Ángela
- The Legend of Frenchie King (1971) - Petite Pluie
- My Dear Killer (1972) - Paola Rossi, the teacher
- The Witches Mountain (1972) – Delia
- The Boldest Job in the West (1972) - Lupe
- A House Without Boundaries (1972) - Chica del Boheme
- Timanfaya (Amor prohibido) (1972)
- Escalofrío diabólico (1972) - Vivianne
- La curiosa (1973) - Azucena
- Crypt of the Living Dead (aka Hannah, Queen of the Vampires) (1973) - Mary
- The Man Called Noon (1973) - Peg Cullane
- Special Killers (1973) - Simone Mattei
- Un casto varón español (1973) - Verónica
- Ella (Trágica obsesión) (1973)
- Samrtno prolece (1973) - Carmina Rigol
- The Killer is One of the Thirteen (1973) (with Paul Naschy) - Lisa Mandel
- Watch Out, We're Mad! (1974) - Liza
- Las violentas (1974) - Chris
- El talón de Aquiles (1974)
- Refuge of Fear (1974) - Carol
- The Stranger and the Gunfighter (1974) - Russian mistress & Her twin-sister
- El monte de las brujas (1975) - Delia
- La ciutat cremada (1976) - Sor Engràcia
- Todos me llaman Gato (1980) - Jane
- Los diablos del mar (1982) - Mrs. Weldom
- Banter (1986) - Alicia
- Rest in Pieces (1987) - Gertrude Stein
- Slugs (1988) - Sue Channing
- Edge of the Axe (1988) - Laura Simmons (final film role)
