= Foster Boy =

- Film poster
- Directed by: Youssef Delara
- Screenplay by: Jay Paul Deratany
- Produced by: Jay Paul Deratany; Anne-Marie Mackay; Peter Samuelson; Andrew Sugerman
- Starring: Shane Paul McGhie; Matthew Modine; Louis Gossett Jr.
- Cinematography: Ben Kufrin
- Edited by: Andrew Drazek
- Music by: Kathryn Bostic
- Distributed by: Gravitas Ventures
- Release date: October 3, 2019 (Nashville)
- Running time: 109 minutes
- Country: United States
- Language: English
- Box office: $19,873

Foster Boy is a 2019 American drama film directed by Youssef Delara and starring Shane Paul McGhie, Matthew Modine and Louis Gossett Jr. Shaquille O'Neal served as an executive producer of the film.

== Cast ==
- Shane Paul McGhie as Jamal Randolph
- Matthew Modine as Michael Trainer
- Michael Hyatt as Shaina Randolph
- Michael Beach as Bill Randolph
- Lex Scott Davis as Keisha James
- Anand Desai-Barochia as Sanjay
- Julie Benz as Pamela Dupree
- Louis Gossett Jr. as Judge George Taylor
- Evan Handler as Samuel Collins
- Dominic Burgess as Dan Cohen
- Amy Brenneman as Kim Trainer
- Jordan Belfi as Jeff
- Krystian Alexander Lyttle as Young Jamal
- Grant Harvey as Joey Poule
- Brendan Morrow as Young Joey Poule

== Production ==
James Earl Jones was originally going to play the role played by Gossett.

== Reception ==
Sandie Angulo Chen of Common Sense Media awarded the film three stars out of five. Matt Fagerholm of RogerEbert.com awarded the film one and a half stars.
