= Saugatuck Cures =

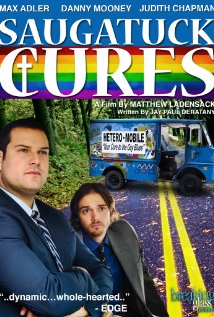
- DVD cover
- Directed by: Matthew Ladensack
- Written by: Jay Paul Deratany
- Produced by: Matthew Ladensack
- Starring: Max Adler; Judith Chapman; Danny Mooney
- Cinematography: Joel C. Warren
- Edited by: Matt Kendrick
- Music by: Bryan Arata
- Distributed by: Breaking Glass Pictures
- Release dates: September 18, 2014 (Palm Springs); June 30, 2015 (United States; DVD)
- Running time: 89 minutes
- Country: United States
- Language: English

Saugatuck Cures is a 2014 American comedy film. It was directed and produced by Matthew Ladensack, written by Jay Paul Deratany, and stars Max Adler, Danny Mooney, and Judith Chapman. The film premiered at the 2014 Palm Springs International LGBT Film Festival.

== Plot ==
Saugatuck Cures follows a widowed bed and breakfast owner, Maggie Callaghan (Chapman), living in Saugatuck, Michigan, dealing with a second round of cancer. When she cannot afford treatment, Maggie's gay son Drew (Adler) becomes determined to raise money for her treatment, though he does not have the slightest idea of how to do it.

After a falling-out with his affluent sister, Penelope, a religious conservative, Drew is convinced by his eccentric best friend Brett (Danny Mooney), who is straight, to pose as ex-gay ministers in order to raise the money by "converting" homosexuals into heterosexuals. The two friends set forth on a crazy adventure, getting into a lot of trouble with the law, family conflicts and not knowing if they will have enough time to save mom.

== Cast ==
- Max Adler as Drew Callaghan
- Danny Mooney as Brett Michaels
- Judith Chapman as Maggie Callaghan
- Amanda Lipinski as Penelope Callaghan
- Matthew Klingler as Paul
- Julianne Howe-Bouwens as LaQuisha
- Jay Paul Deratany as Reverend Stan

== Release ==
Saugatuck Cures premiered Opening Night at the Cinema Diverse: Palm Springs International LGBT Film Festival, Reeling LGBT International Film Festival and QFlix Philadelphia in the same weekend.

== Reception ==
Saugatuck Cures received a negative review from the Los Angeles Times, which stated that "... the film actually vilifies those struggling to reconcile their religious upbringing with their sexual orientation. Given the higher suicide rate among gay youths, you'd expect a little compassion instead of mockery for the closet cases." Its release at the Cinema Diverse film festival in Palm Springs also resulted in an Audience Choice Award from the same festival.

== Home media ==
Breaking Glass Pictures releases Saugatuck Cures on DVD and digitally on iTunes, Amazon Video, VOD for all cable providers on June 30, 2015.
