= The Civility of Albert Cashier =

Folk/country musical

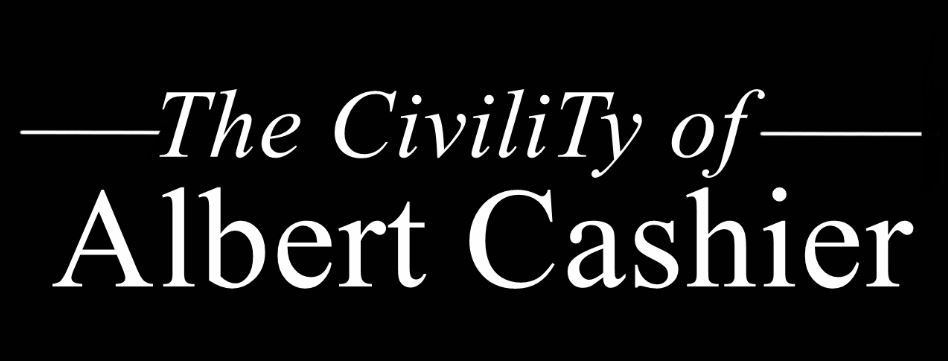
- Title similar to that used in Chicago stage production
- Lyrics: Jay Paul Deratany; Joe Stevens; Keaton Wooden
- Book: Jay Paul Deratany
- Setting: American Civil War
- Basis: Albert Cashier
- Premiere: 2017: Chicago

The Civility of Albert Cashier is a folk/country musical about transgender American Civil War soldier Albert Cashier with book by Jay Paul Deratany, music by Joe Stevens and Keaton Wooden, and lyrics by Stevens, Wooden, and Deratany.

== Production history ==
It received a developmental run from August 31, 2017 to October 15, 2017 on Stage 773 in Chicago, after several workshopping sessions at The Chicago Musical Theater Festival at Victory Gardens, The Los Angeles LGBT Arts Center, and at the Marriott Theater in Chicago and starred Dani Shay as Young Albert Cashier.

In May 2022, the Trans Entertainment Guild hosted a staged concert version of the musical off-Broadway, and starred Achilles Mulkey and Fin Gagnon as Young Albert, with an all-trans/gender nonconforming cast, at The Players Theatre in New York City.

The show, starring Dani Shay again in the lead, reopened at the Colony Theatre in Burbank, California in August 2024.

== Synopsis ==
=== Act I ===
The musical begins with an elderly Albert Cashier remembering his youth as a soldier in the Civil War ("Ghost Boy"). A flashback is shown about Young Albert enlisting into Company G of the 95th Illinois Volunteer Infantry Regiment, where Sergeant Collins is mustering troops ("Battle Cry of Freedom"). Young Albert meets several other men, including Billy Middleton, Walter Suiter, and Jeffrey N. Davis. Young Albert then ponders his potential, and how he will impact on the war ("Bullet in a Gun"). The flashback ends, revealing an older Cashier, still refusing to receive a bath. Albert appears to liken this to a skirmish he experienced, and we see Young Albert and fellow soldiers fighting Confederate troops ("I'm Alive").

Young Albert impresses his newfound friends with his use of a rifle, but is ultimately knocked unconscious by a rebel. Jeffrey N. Davis pulls him off the field to safety. Older Albert becomes confused as he tries to remember his childhood in Ireland, when the only person he remembers is a small girl ("What is Real?"). Nurse Smith enters, and attempts to get Albert to take a bath, but he refuses. He is saved by his doctor, who is concerned about Albert's mental state as well as physical health, and orders the nurse to give Albert a steak each Friday to strengthen his constitution.

Young Albert sits at a fire with the African-American soldier Walter Suiter, and they argue about whether a rainstorm is coming. Young Albert laughs off Walter's conviction, and tactlessly says "That's your imagination-but then again I had always heard you slaves were full of imagination." Walter replies that he is not, nor ever was, a slave, and rain begins to pour ("Following the Sound"). Young Albert meets Jeffrey again, is exasperated by his constant nervous chatter, but declare each other friends ("Brothers in Arms").

Back in 1901, Albert is brought his weekly steak by hospital attendant John Curtis, who tells him about his dream to go to Chicago and sing ("Chicago"). Nurse Smith comes in to see John singing and dancing, and fires him for unprofessional behavior. Albert gives John money for a train to Chicago, and he leaves. Back in 1863, the Siege of Vicksburg is commencing, and the soldiers see death for the first time ("Civilized"). Walter is shot and killed during the battle, along with Billy Middleton and Sergeant Collins. Afterwards, only Albert and Jeffery remain. Jeffery leaves to fight the last several Confederate soldiers, and Albert is left alone and taken captive ("Better"). The perspective changes back to the elderly Albert, who is appalled to hear he has been taken by a new doctor, who had ordered for him to be bathed. One of the hospital attendants gives Albert a drug that renders him comatose as Nurse Smith prepares to give him a bath. As she takes off his clothing, she sees that he has breasts.

=== Act II ===
The second act begins with both Alberts lamenting how they can never live in peace if they choose to live as themselves ("Praying for the Light"). Albert is in court being tried for impersonating a man and defrauding the federal government. The judge mocks Albert and tells him one of the witnesses coming to testify is Jeffrey N. Davis, who Albert has not seen in over 40 years. The scene changes to show Young Albert tied to a chair and being interrogated by two Confederate officers, and escaping ("What Will You Fight For?"). Meanwhile, Jeffrey is searching for Albert across the Mason-Dixie line, and begins to question whether he thinks of Albert as more than a friend, and comes to terms with his love for him ("Excuse Me, Sir"). Older Albert is being held in the hospital as the trial progresses, and is visited by Nurse Smith, who tries to convince him to give up acting like a man so he can be acquitted. He refuses, and she leaves angrily ("Woman to Woman").

Young Albert and Jeffrey find each other, and Jeffrey discovers Albert is not cisgender and proposes marriage to him, but Albert declines ("Perfect Home"). A bugle boy locates them and announces that the war is over. As Jeffrey rushes away to go prepare to go back to Belvidere, Albert contemplates his future, and how he could never be satisfied living as a woman ("I Gotta Try"). He runs away to create his own future, leaving Jeffrey behind. 40 years later, they meet again, and reflect fondly with each other. Albert's trial continues, and many of his fellow soldiers testify that he is a man, and the charge is dropped due to insufficient evidence.

Nurse Smith returns, and takes Albert to the Watertown State Hospital for the Insane, due to one of her attendants reporting him. Albert is forced to wear a dress and corset, which restricts his breathing and strains his body to the point of killing him ("Breathe. Walk. Home."). His funeral is attended by soldiers from his regiment, and Jeffrey, who demands Albert be buried in his uniform. The play ends with Young Albert singing, "I can't deny, I heard the call." ("Finale")

== Musical Numbers ==
=== Act I ===
- Ghost Boy- Albert and Young Albert
- Battlecry of Freedom- Sergeant Collins, Young Albert, ensemble
- Bullet in a Gun- Young Albert
- I'm Alive- Albert, Young Albert, ensemble
- What is Real- Albert
- Following the Sound- Walter Suiter
- Brothers in Arms- Young Albert, Jeffrey, ensemble
- Chicago- John Curtis
- Civilized- Walter, Sergeant Collins, Young Albert, ensemble
- Better- Young Albert, ensemble

=== Act II ===
- Praying for the Light- Albert, Young Albert
- What Will You Fight For?- Young Albert, Albert, ensemble
- Excuse Me, Sir- Jeffrey
- Woman to Woman- Nurse Smith, Albert
- Perfect Home- Jeffrey, Young Albert
- I Gotta Try- Young Albert
- Breathe. Walk. Home- Albert, ensemble
- Finale- Ensemble

== Critical reception ==
The Civility of Albert Cashier received high praise during its Chicago run, called "a gorgeous, noteworthy piece of theater that begs to be experienced" by Chicago Theatre Review, as well as being called "Flawlessly deployed," by NewCity Stage.

The Chicago Tribune said it "Sings with real heart and force. After its conclusion, Civility was invited to do a reading at the New York Musical Theatre Festival on July 17, 2018.

Transgender writer Asher Phoenix of the Los Angeles Times wrote "I drove 12 hours to Chicago to see my childhood hero, Dani Shay, in a new musical. Shay was bringing to life the story of a Civil War veteran who ultimately saved my life."
