= False Face (film) =

- Original release poster
- Directed by: John Grissmer
- Written by: John Grissmer
- Story by: Joseph Weintraub
- Produced by: John Grissmer; Joseph Weintraub
- Starring: Robert Lansing; Judith Chapman
- Cinematography: Edward Lachman
- Edited by: Christopher Ness; Joseph Weintraub
- Music by: Bob Cobert
- Production company: PJ Productions
- Distributed by: United International Pictures; AVCO Embassy Pictures
- Release date: March 4, 1977 (Minneapolis)
- Running time: 95 minutes
- Country: United States
- Language: English
- Budget: $400,000

False Face (Note: The film's original title was False Face, and it was released as such in 1977. However, it was acquired in 1979 by AVCO Embassy Pictures, who re-titled it Scalpel and gave it a theatrical re-release under this title.) is a 1977 American psychological horror film directed by John Grissmer, and starring Robert Lansing and Judith Chapman. Its plot follows a mentally-unstable plastic surgeon who transforms a young accident victim to resemble his missing daughter, all part of a scheme to inherit a property from his deceased millionaire father-in-law.

The film was released regionally in 1977 through United International Pictures, and re-released in 1979 under the title Scalpel after it was acquired by AVCO Embassy Pictures.

== Plot ==
Phillip Reynolds is a widowed, successful plastic surgeon and a charismatic sociopath. After he sees his daughter, Heather, making love to her boyfriend, he kills the boyfriend and stages the scene to appear like an accident. Heather witnesses this from afar and runs away from home in terror.

A year later, after the death of his millionaire father-in-law, Phillip discovers that both he and his brother-in-law, Bradley, are not in the will. The deceased patriarch correctly blames Phillip for his daughter's drowning death years ago and bequeaths the entirety of his $5 million estate to his granddaughter (Phillip's daughter), Heather. However, no one in the family has heard from her since she fled from home.

While driving late one night, Phillip and Bradley come across a stripper who has been severely beaten by a nightclub bouncer, leaving her face unrecognizable. Phillip brings her to the hospital and devises a plan to alter her face to the likeness of Heather; he suggests to the Jane Doe that she pose as Heather to collect the $5 million inheritance and then split it with him. The woman, whom Phillip refers to as "Jane," has little choice and agrees to the plan. Phillip brings Jane to his home to recover. For several weeks he coaches her to act like his daughter, playing recordings of Heather's voice and teaching her Heather's mannerisms.

Phillip holds a family party to celebrate Heather's "return," and to see if Jane can successfully convince the family members that she is Heather. At the party, Bradley is suspicious when Jane refuses to play piano, as Heather was a musical prodigy, but the rest of the family believes Heather has returned. Jane/Heather collects the $5 million and splits it with Phillip, and they begin a romantic relationship.

Returning home one day, Phillip and Jane discover Bradley waiting for them. Bradley accuses Jane of being an imposter, but in the argument he suffers a heart attack. To Jane's dismay, Phillip takes away Bradley's medication and callously plays "Chopsticks" on the piano as he dies. At Bradley's funeral, the real Heather watches from afar.

Phillip and Jane return home to find Heather, who acts as if nothing is unusual. Phillip lies to her, saying that her grandfather left all his money to a college. The trio live together uneasily for several days until Heather, who realizes that her father changed Jane's face, tells them that she plans to visit the family lawyer in Atlanta to inquire about her grandfather's will. Phillip tells Jane that he will hire a hitman to kill Heather, but in fact he hires the hitman to kill Jane.

Phillip returns to the house and tells Heather that he killed Jane for her. He then attempts to rape Heather, but is stopped by Jane, who has escaped the killer and knocks Phillip out with a cast-iron skillet.

Heather and Jane embrace, and Heather explains that for the past year, she had been staying in a sanitarium owned by Dr. Dean, a family friend. She entered the sanitarium after witnessing Phillip murder her boyfriend; while Dean wanted to have her father arrested, Heather wanted to understand her father's actions and thus returned home. Dean arrives at the house, and when Phillip awakens, Dean and Heather together tell him that there was never a "Jane." Phillip has a psychotic break where he is tormented by the people he has killed. Several other doctors place Phillip in a straitjacket and take him to the sanitarium.

Jane departs the house with the medical staff, leaving Heather and Dean together in an embrace. As Phillip is incarcerated in the sanitarium, Jane, still impersonating Heather, is met by the family's lawyers at the airport. She receives $2.5 million before departing on a private jet.

== Cast ==
- Robert Lansing as Dr. Phillip Reynolds
- Judith Chapman as Heather / Jane
- Arlen Dean Snyder as Uncle Bradley
- David Scarroll as Dr. Robert Dean
- Sandy Martin as Sandy
- Muriel Moore as Margaret
- Stan Wojno as Donald
- Laura Whyte as Jennifer Reynolds
- Larry Quackenbush as Keith Jarvey
- Mimi Honce as Maddie Schuster

== Production ==
Scalpel was shot on location in Atlanta and Covington, Georgia on a budget of $400,000. The home featured in the film is the antebellum Turner mansion in Covington, which was spared by General William Tecumseh Sherman during his Civil War March to the Sea. Atlanta's Oakland Cemetery was also used a filming location. The film was shot by cinematographer Edward Lachman.

== Release ==
The film was originally released theatrically under the title False Face in early 1977, opening regionally on March 4 that year in Minneapolis, Minnesota, and on March 11 in Indianapolis, Indiana.

It was later re-released by AVCO Embassy Pictures under the title Scalpel in a PG-rated version on June 6, 1979.

=== Critical response ===
Scalpel received mixed reviews from critics upon its release, with some critics noting the film's unevenness, and the climactic twist as being "unconvincing". Dennis Schwartz of Ozus’ World Movie Reviews gave the film a C+, calling the film "uneven" and criticized the finale, while also noting that the film was still entertaining in a goofy way.

Don Morrison of The Minneapolis Star lauded the film as a "sleeper hit," praising Judith Chapman's performance as well as Grissmer's direction. Diane Frederick of the Indianapolis News was critical of the film's violent content, though she noted that it "offers a couple of observations about values." A review published in the Wisconsin State Journal criticized the film for its lack of plausibility: "Writer-director John Grissmer gets points for the tricky plot but loses all of them for not knowing how to make it believable for even as second."

The horror website The Terror Trap rated the film two and a half out of four stars, noting that, although it was easier to follow than other similar films and commended Chapman's performance, the reviewer felt that the film's premise was fully utilized as it should have been.

Alternately, Budd Wilkins of Slant Magazine awarded the film a more positive four out of five stars, writing, "As a slice of sordid Southern gothic nastiness, shot through with a vein of mordant black humor, Scalpel is a cut above."

=== Home media ===
Arrow Films released the film for the first time on Blu-ray on February 27, 2018.

== Sources ==
- Albright, Brian (2012). Regional Horror Films, 1958–1990: A State-by-State Guide with Interviews. Jefferson, North Carolina: McFarland. ISBN 978-0-786-47227-7.
