= Dani Shay =

American non-binary actor, singer and musician

- Born: United States
- Occupations: Actor, singer, musician
- Known for: America's Got Talent; The Glee Project

Dani Shay is an American non-binary actor, singer and musician.

Shay competed on the reality television series America's Got Talent and The Glee Project and has also starred in films such as Trick and musicals as The Civility of Albert Cashier.

== Quotes ==
People often want to call me a lesbian, which is accurate if you're looking at me as simply a female because yes, I do tend to gravitate toward other females. But the thing is that I don't view myself as only female, and I don't view myself as only male either. I feel like I'm a mix. It doesn't exactly feel accurate to call someone who feels that way a lesbian because of that male side of me.

== Media ==
Transgender writer Asher Phoenix of the Los Angeles Times wrote "I drove 12 hours to Chicago to see my childhood hero, Dani Shay, in a new musical. Shay was bringing to life the story of a Civil War veteran who ultimately saved my life."

OK! magazine, “Move over Rebecca Black, Dani Shay is hot on your heels. Dani, an aspiring singer/songwriter, shares a shocking resemblance to Justin Bieber, and she even sounds likes him. Equally as shocking, Dani did not know who Justin was until she was repeatedly mistaken for the 17-year-old pop singing sensation.”
