= Manuel de Blas =

Spanish actor (born 1941)

- Born: Manuel de Blas Muñoz; 12 April 1941 (age 85); Badajoz, Spain
- Other name: Manolo de Blas
- Occupation: Actor
- Years active: 1961–present
- Spouse: Patty Shepard (m. 1967; died 2013)
- Children: 1

Manuel de Blas Muñoz (born 12 April 1941) is a Spanish film, television, and stage actor.

== Biography ==
Manuel de Blas was born in Badajoz in 1941 and was raised in Córdoba. At age 14, he moved to Madrid. He studied a degree in political sciences, also joining the Escuela de Cine.

De Blas married American actress Patty Shepard in 1967. They went on to act in several films together and remained married until the death of the actress in January 2013.

During his career, he has starred in many films. In 2012, he obtained a role in the movie Paranormal Xperience 3D.

== Selected filmography ==
- Goya, a Story of Solitude (1971)
- The Vampires Night Orgy (1972)
- The Girl from the Red Cabaret (1973)
- Watch Out, We're Mad! (1974)
- El vicio y la virtud (1975)
- El Internado (2007-2010)
- Uncharted (2022)
