= Haram! Iran! =

2008 play by Jay Paul Deratany

- Written by: Jay Paul Deratany
- Original language: English
- Setting: Iran

Premiere
- Place premiered: Athenaeum Theater (Chicago)

Haram! Iran! is a 2008 play written by Jay Paul Deratany. It is based on the true story of Mahmoud Asgari and Ayaz Marhoni who were put to death in Iran for an alleged homosexual encounter.

== Background ==
Haram! Iran! is based on the true story of Mahmoud Asgari and Ayaz Marhoni, two teenagers from Iran who were convicted of raping a 13-year-old boy. The case drew international attention due to the death sentence (public hanging) handed down. Conflicting evidence of the boys being homosexual and the identity of the victim caused controversy surrounding the case.

The play was written by Jay Paul Deratany, a human rights advocate and attorney from Chicago. It opened in Chicago in 2008 at the Athenaeum Theater. It also played in locations such as Celebration Theatre in Los Angeles, New York City and in London. It received a top 10 recognition for Greenlight's Screenplay Competition and was also nominated for a GLAD Award for its Los Angeles performance.

== Plot ==
The play focuses on two friends (Mahmoud and Fareed) who are athletes and want to play for the Iran national football team. Doing poorly in school, Mahmoud is referred to a study partner (Ayaz) to help with his grades. Set in post-Iranian Revolution, Ayaz is a book collector and has several that are considered forbidden under Iranian law. Mahmoud becomes intrigued with Ayaz's escapism through reading, and they become friends. Mahmoud and Ayaz are later seen in an incriminating situation by Fareed who had become jealous of the friendship. The two are arrested and tried for being homosexual.

== Accolades ==
Award	Category	Recipients	Result	Ref
GLAAD Media Award	Outstanding Los Angeles Theater	Jay Paul Deratany	Nominated	
Greenlight	Screenplay Competition	Jay Paul Deratany	Top 10	
