= My Dear Killer =

- Italian: Mio caro assassino
- Directed by: Tonino Valerii
- Screenplay by: Franco Bucceri; Roberto Leoni; Tonino Valerii
- Story by: Franco Bucceri; Roberto Leoni
- Produced by: Manolo Bolognini
- Starring: George Hilton; Salvo Randone; Marilu Tolo; William Berger; Manuel Zarzo
- Cinematography: Manuel Rojas
- Edited by: Franco Fraticelli
- Music by: Ennio Morricone
- Production companies: B.R.C. Produzione Film S.r.l.; Kramot Cinematografica S.r.l.; Tecisa Film
- Distributed by: Jumbo Cinematografica (Italy)
- Release date: February 3, 1972 (Italy)
- Running time: 102 minutes
- Countries: Italy; Spain
- Language: Italian
- Box office: ₤250 million

My Dear Killer (Italian: Mio caro assassino) is a 1972 Italian-Spanish giallo film directed by Tonino Valerii and starring George Hilton, Marilù Tolo, Patty Shepard, Helga Line, Salvo Randone and William Berger. Some critics considered it "one of the best films in the thriller genre" and as "one of the best, most vibrant and well designed products of Italian giallo."

== Plot ==
Police Commissioner Luca Peretti is assigned to investigate a seemingly isolated murder case. Umberto Paradisi, a private investigator for an insurance company, had been decapitated by an excavator at a rural swamp area. Soon after, the worker who operated the excavator is found hanged. Peretti discovers a clue at the scene indicating the driver of the excavator did not commit suicide, but was in fact murdered. He also discovers that the murdered investigator was working on a cold case involving the kidnapping and murder of Stefania Moroni, the young daughter of a wealthy industrialist; when her father attempted to pay the ransom, he too was kidnapped, and both of them were left to die. The investigator had evidently discovered a lead, and was trying to sell the information to the victims' relatives.

Peretti proceeds to question other people connected with the Moroni case, including Stefania's traumatized mother, her uncle Oliviero—who lost one of his hands during the war—along with his wife, other relatives, and the family's servants. However, additional murders begin to occur. The investigator's wife is strangled to death at a public transport station, Stefania's kindergarten teacher is mutilated with a circular saw, and Mattia, a destitute man who lived in a small shack near the site of the investigator's murder, is bludgeoned to death with a statue.

Arriving at the shack where Stefania and her father were left to die, Peretti realizes that Stefania had left a clue to her kidnapper's identity before dying, evidently on the back of a mirror. That night, the murderer tries to kill an elderly lady who unknowingly came into possession of the mirror, but Peretti arrives at the scene just in time, forcing him to flee. Upon recovering the mirror, Peretti examines the back of it and realizes that it perfectly implicates the killer.

Peretti summons the police to the Moroni family home, and with the entire family present, proceeds to excoriate the killer for killing in cold blood while overlooking the one detail that revealed his identity. Peretti then produces the mirror, and upon showing the back of it to Beniamino, he screams before someone cuts off the lights in the room. Once the chaos settles and the lights are turned back on, Oliviero is found sobbing in the corner behind a chair. He admits to having killed Stefania and her father out of jealousy for the latter's wealth, and all the others in an attempt to cover his tracks.

Peretti orders the police to arrest Oliviero as the camera focuses on the back of the mirror, revealing the clue to the killer's identity—a human figure, drawn by Stefania, missing one of its hands.

== Cast ==
- George Hilton as Inspector Luca Peretti
- Marilù Tolo as Dr. Anna Borgese
- Salvo Randone as Chief Marò
- William Berger as Giorgio Canavese
- Manuel Zarzo as Brigadier Bozzi
- Patty Shepard as Paola Rossi, the teacher
- Piero Lulli as Alessandro Moroni
- Helga Liné as Mrs. Paradisi
- Tullio Valli as Oliviero Moroni
- Dante Maggio as Mattia Guardapelle
- Alfredo Mayo as Beniamino
- Corrado Gaipa as Head of Insurance Company
- Dana Ghia as Eleonora Moroni
- Monica Randall as Carla Moroni
- Lara Wendel as Stefania
- Francesco di Federico as Umberto Paradisi
- Lola Gaos as Adele Rudigiani

== Production ==
Jose Gutierrez Maesso is credited as a screenwriter on the film, but did not actually contribute to the script of My Dear Killer. Maesso was credited for co-production reasons.

George Hilton was cast in My Dear Killer by Tonino Valerii. Valerii stated that the role was "difficult" to Hilton and that he was "told by many people that it does not suit you" Hilton considered the role to be a "challenging task" as he found Valerii a "very demanding director, and movie was filmed in English." This included the final scene where Hilton has a long monologue, that was changed only allowing Hilton half an hour to memorise the new dialogue. Hilton spoke positively about the film later, saying that of all the films he had done he would save about four of them, including Massacre Time, The Ruthless Four, The Case of the Scorpion's Tail and My Dear Killer.

Tonino Valerii said the pedophile uncle's character was completely rewritten in the process. "It was a character that you could not tell what he was in the film for, so we told ourselves, 'Either we take it out of the film or we develop it'. And we had the idea of the naked little girl that appears at the door of his studio during the commissioner's visit..."

== Release ==
My Dear Killer was released in Italy on February 3, 1972 where it was distributed by Jumbo Cinematografica. The film grossed 250 million Italian lira.
