= Fire on the Amazon =

1993 film by Luis Llosa

- Home video cover art
- Directed by: Luis Llosa
- Written by: Luana Anders; Catherine Cyran; Beverly Gray
- Produced by: Luis Llosa
- Starring: Craig Sheffer; Sandra Bullock; Juan Fernández; Judith Chapman; Ramsay Ross
- Cinematography: Pili Flores-Guerra
- Edited by: Robert L. Goodman; Michael Thibault
- Music by: Roy J. Ravio
- Distributed by: Concorde-New Horizons
- Release date: October 1993
- Running time: 78-102 minutes (depending on cut)
- Countries: United States; Peru
- Languages: English; Spanish

Fire on the Amazon is a 1993 American-Peruvian adventure drama film directed by Luis Llosa and starring Craig Sheffer and Sandra Bullock.

== Plot ==
American magazine photojournalism RJ O'Brien arrives in Bolivia's Amazon basin to write a story about the rainforest. From his contact Chato, he learns of the efforts by Rafael Santos, the charismatic leader of the rubber tree tappers union, to lead a nonviolent resistance against corporate cattle ranchers. After numerous death threats, Santos is killed at his family home, seemingly by an indigenous assassin. Chato explains, it's the "Indians against rubber tappers, tappers against Indians, cattle ranchers against both," while the land is being bought up with "big money". The community rises up in protest at Santos' funeral procession, conducted by father Benacio. Santos' daughter Gloria tells O'Brien she saw a policeman, when her father was killed. After meeting the environmental activist, Alyssa Rothman from the Rainforest Preservation Society, O'Brien follows Alyssa and her associate Sandra to a meeting at the home of Mr. Lucavida where father Benacio and the community are gathered to discuss events. Having arrived uninvited, O'Brien is shown the door. Later, that, evening, his film is confiscated, by a pistoleiro at a cantina.

The next day, while interviewing Mr. Pedrosa about the timber industry, O'Brien is taken hostage by a suspect being chased by police, led by Valdez. The suspect, Djamori of the Zingari tribe, is apprehended, but so is O'Brien. Valdez interrogates O'Brien about his connection to Djamori, who they claim killed Santos. O'Brien tells them to contact Alyssa to confirm his story; she arrives to bail him out. At a press conference, O'Brien suggests the police are framing Djamori. Two days later, before a trial can be conducted, Djamori is declared dead after supposedly hanging himself in his cell.

Sandra and Alyssa tell O'Brien the Zingari tribe are from the highlands. Setting off to learn more, they stop to help a woman whose house has been set on fire, and rescue her son Antonio who is trapped inside. At the river, they see Ataninde, who is taking Djamori's body for funeral rites. Against Alyssa's wishes, O'Brien insists they follow Ataninde on the river in a canoe. The pistoleiro follows them, and shoots O'Brien in the shoulder with a rifle. They escape into the rainforest only to be captured by the Zingari, led by Ataninde. In their village, RJ photographs the fatal blows that prove Djamori was murdered. That evening during the funeral dance, Alyssa and O'Brien are given an hallucinogenic drink, leading to passionate sex.

The next day, they develop the photos, but Valdez intercepts and ties up O'Brien inside his hotel room with a bomb. Alyssa saves him in time and they flee. Alyssa suspects Sandra knew about the bomb. At her office, O'Brien sees the pistoleiro handing Lucavida his photos, while Sandra sits with them. When Ataninde refuses to help them further, they shelter with Nacia Santos well RJ calls Chato to arrange a flight out of Bolivia. He agrees to meet in Bella Vista, but Valdez finds them first. Valdez and the police try to take O'Brien away, but the community bands together in passive resistance to bar his way. Valdez shoots one of them, but Nacia and Alyssa join them, interlocking their arms to form a human wall. Enraged, Valdez shoots Alyssa. Before they can haul O'Brien away, Ataninde takes Valdez hostage to demand his release. O'Brien picks up Alyssa, and Ataninde stabs Valdez to death.

Every day, more than 70,000 acres of rainforest are destroyed. The loss to humanity and science is incalculable.

— Closing statement

While driving away, the pistoleiro fires at them. Ataninde shoots the pistoleiro, but not mortally. As Chato arrives with his sea plane, the pistoleiro kills Ataninde with a crossbow. O'Brien finally kills the pistoleiro, and Chato flies O'Brien and Alyssa away from arriving police. Before she dies, Alyssa asks O'Brien to promise her, "Write about what you feel, not about what you have seen".

== Cast ==
- Craig Sheffer as RJ O'Brien, a photojournalism and Alyssa's lover.
- Sandra Bullock as Alyssa Rothman, an environmental activist and RJ's lover.
- Juan Fernández as Ataninde
- Judith Chapman as Sandra
- Ramsay Ross as Pistoleiro
- David Elkin as Lucavida
- Jorge García Bustamante as Valdez
- Baldomero Cáceres as Pedro
- Carlos Victoria as Miguel
- Reynaldo Arenas as Djamori
- Ramon Garcia as Chato
- Eduardo Cesti as Rafael Santos
- Natalia Torres as Nanci Santos
- David Killerby as Father Benacio

== Production ==
As reported on A&E's Biography on November 18, 2005, in an interview clip with the film's director, the film was a harrowing experience in many ways. Bullock was concerned that the canoe she was riding could have possibly tipped over and dumped her in dangerous waters.

== Reception ==
Leonard Maltin summarized that this "well-intentioned 'save the rainforest'" film was "marred" by Sheffer's "reckless and hostile behavior" and whose "contrived romance" with Bullock is not believable.
