= Hannah, Queen of the Vampires =

- Directed by: Julio Salvador; Ray Danton (new footage)
- Screenplay by: Julio Salvador; Lou Shaw (U.S. version)
- Story by: Ricardo Ferrer; Lois Gibson (U.S. version)
- Produced by: Lou Shaw
- Starring: Andrew Prine; Mark Damon; Patty Shepard; Teresa Gimpera
- Cinematography: Juan Gelpí
- Music by: Phillip Lambro
- Release dates: March 1973 (San Antonio, Texas)
- Running time: 75 min
- Countries: Spain; United States
- Languages: Spanish; English

Hannah, Queen of the Vampires (original title La tumba de la isla maldita) (a.k.a. Young Hanna, Queen of the Vampires, Crypt of the Living Dead and Vampire Woman) is a 1973 Spanish/American horror film directed by Julio Salvador, with additional footage directed by Ray Danton, and starring Andrew Prine, Teresa Gimpera, Mark Damon and Patty Shepard.

== Plot ==
Vampire Hannah, entombed on a remote island, is accidentally awakened and begins to terrorize the island's inhabitants.

== Cast ==
- Andrew Prine as Chris Bolton
- Patty Shepard as Mary
- Mark Damon as Peter
- Teresa Gimpera as Hannah

== Home media ==
The film was released on DVD by VCI in June 2001.
