= Leland C. Shepard Jr. =

United States Air Force general

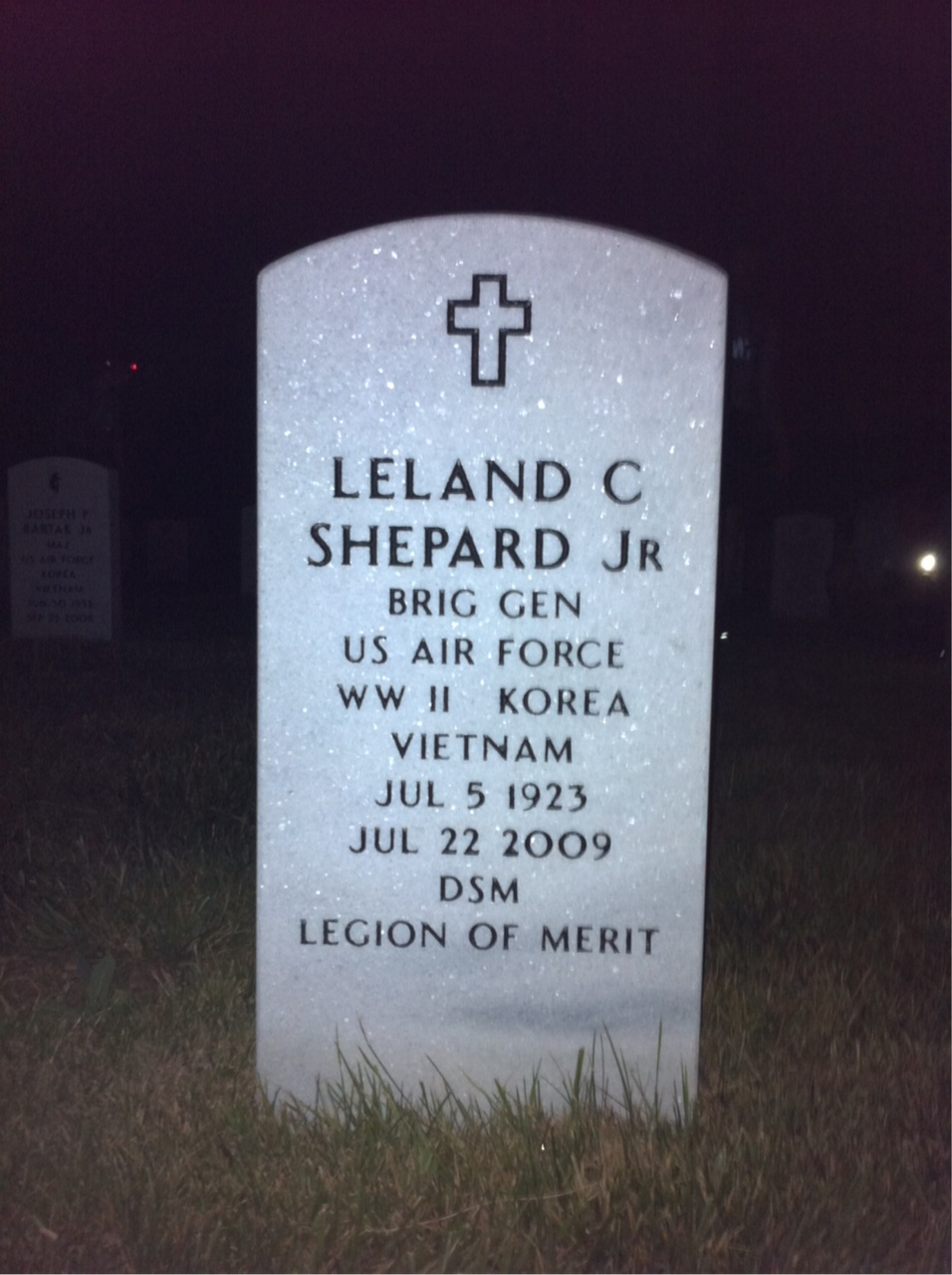
- Grave at Arlington National Cemetery
- Born: July 5, 1923; Miami, Florida, U.S.
- Died: July 22, 2009 (aged 86); West Palm Beach, Florida, U.S.
- Military career
- Allegiance: United States
- Branch: United States Air Force
- Service years: 1942–1977
- Rank: Brigadier General
- Commands: Military Airlift Command
- Conflicts: World War II; Korean War; Vietnam War
- Awards: Legion of Merit; Distinguished Flying Cross; Joint Service Commendation Medal

Leland Casper "Bob" Shepard Jr. (July 5, 1923 – July 22, 2009) was a brigadier general in the United States Air Force.

Shepard was born in Miami, Florida. After graduating from Ponce de Leon High School in Coral Gables, Florida, he was a student at the University of Florida when he enlisted in the United States Army Air Corps in April 1942. Completing flying school, he was commissioned a second lieutenant and received his pilot wings in May 1943. He joined the 83rd Bombardment Squadron in November and flew 25 combat missions in a B-25 Mitchell medium bomber from southern Italy. In March 1944, he was transferred to Burma, where he completed another 33 missions with the B-25. In October, he returned to the United States as an instructor pilot.

After the end of the war, he resumed his studies and received a Juris Doctor degree from the University of Florida, being admitted to the bar in 1948. In 1949, he returned to active duty and served first as an assistant staff judge advocate, then in September 1951 as a staff judge advocate.

In 1952, after training for the B26, he served in the Korean War as a pilot and operations officer of the 13th Bombardment Squadron for one year. In 1954, he transferred to the 40th Fighter Squadron, flying the F-86 Sabre jet fighter and the B-57 Canberra bomber/reconnaissance aircraft. After serving with the 41st Air Division, he returned to the United States in August 1957 to attend the Air Command and Staff School.

In July 1958, he began a five-year period in various jobs at Headquarters Strategic Air Command, Offutt Air Force Base, Nebraska. In July 1963, he was posted to the 7th Air Division in England as a command post controller and B-47 Stratojet strategic bomber pilot. Two years later, he joined the Sixteenth Air Force, stationed in Spain as chief of the Control Division. In June 1967, he returned to the United States and served in various roles at the United States Air Force Military Personnel Center, Randolph Air Force Base, Texas. Shepard also served as a deputy director at the United States Air Force National Headquarters from March 1971 to August 1973. He then served as chief of staff to the Joint United States Military Assistance Group in Korea. His last command was as the deputy chief of staff for the Military Airlift Command at Scott Air Force Base, Illinois. He was promoted to brigadier general effective February 1, 1973, with date of rank January 31.

He retired from the Air Force on April 1, 1977, after 35 years of active service, and was a recipient of the Legion of Merit with Oak Leaf Cluster, Distinguished Flying Cross, Air Medal, Joint Service Commendation Medal, Air Force Commendation Medal, and a Distinguished Unit Citation.

General Shepard is the father of actresses Judith Chapman and Patty Shepard.

Shepard died at the age of 86 on July 22, 2009, in his home in West Palm Beach, Florida, and he was later interred in Arlington National Cemetery on October 14, 2009.
