= Albert Cashier =

American soldier (1843–1915)

Albert D. J. Cashier
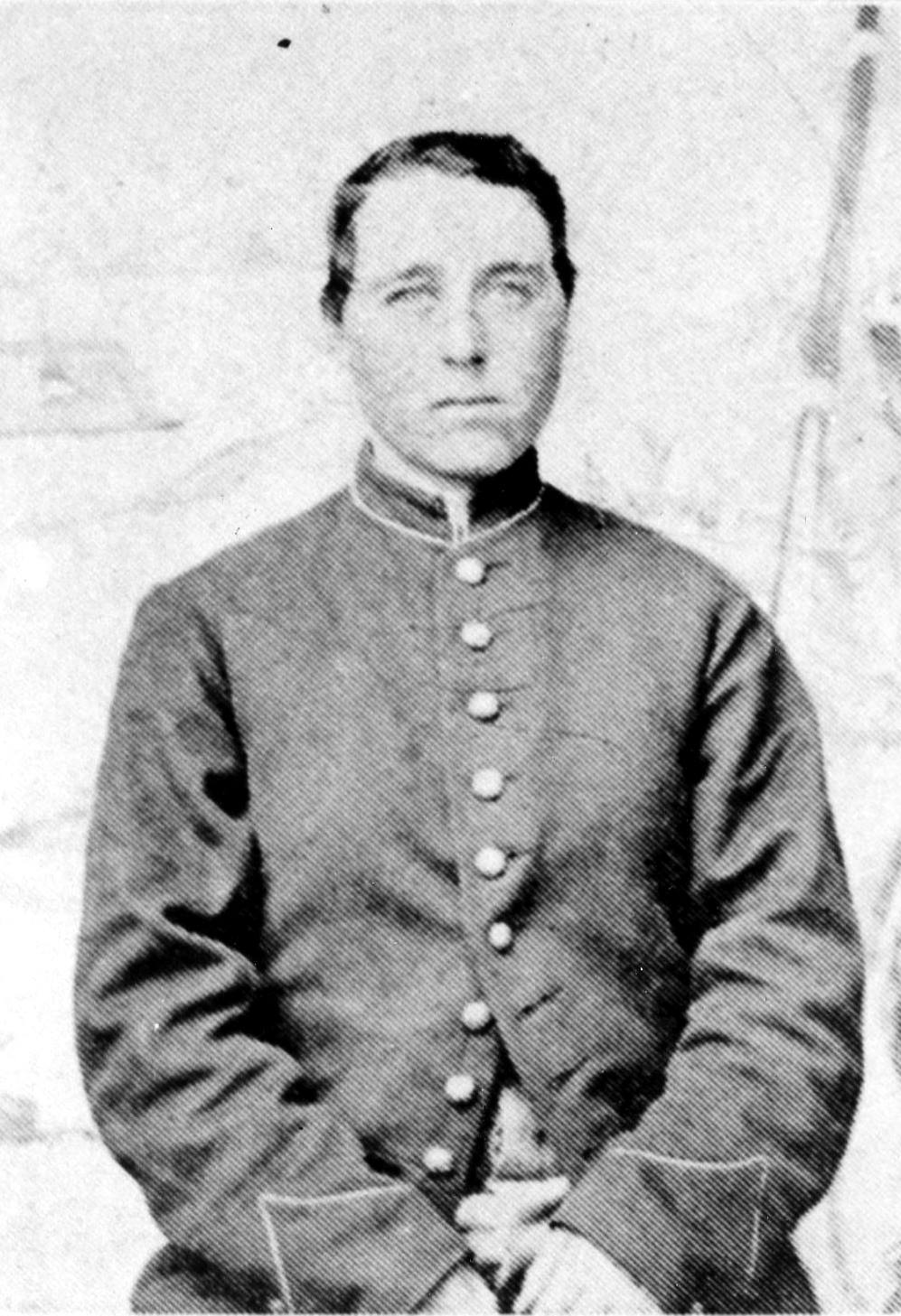
- Cashier in 1864
- Born: Jennie Irene Hodgers; December 25, 1843; Clogherhead, County Louth, Ireland
- Died: October 10, 1915 (aged 71); Saunemin, Illinois, U.S.
- Burial place: Saunemin, Illinois, U.S.
- Military career
- Allegiance: United States of America: Union
- Branch: United States Army: Union Army
- Service years: 1862–1865
- Rank: Private
- Units: 95th Illinois Infantry, Company G
- Conflicts: Vicksburg, Red River, Guntown
- Other work: Cemetery worker, janitor, lamplighter

Albert D. J. Cashier (December 25, 1843 – October 11, 1915) was an Irish-born American soldier who served in the Union Army during the American Civil War. Cashier became famous as one of at least 250 soldiers who were assigned female at birth and enlisted as men to fight in the Civil War. He adopted the identity of a man before enlisting, and maintained it until death. The consistent and nearly lifelong (at least 53 years) commitment to a male identity has prompted some historians to believe that Cashier was a trans man.

== Early life ==
According to a later investigation by the administrator of Cashier's estate, Albert Cashier was born Jennie Irene Hodgers in Clogherhead, (Note: This is spelled "Clogher Head" in the Tsui book.) County Louth, Ireland, on December 25, 1843, to Sallie and Patrick Hodgers. Typically, his uncle or stepfather was said to have dressed him in male clothing so he could work in an all-male shoe factory in Illinois. Even before the advent of the war, he adopted the identity of Albert Cashier in order to live independently. Sallie Hodgers, Cashier's mother, was known to have died prior to 1862, by which time Cashier had traveled as a stowaway to Belvidere, Illinois, and was working as a farmhand to a man named Avery.

Cashier was elderly and suffering from dementia when he was interviewed about immigrating to the United States and enlisting in the army, and had always been evasive about early life; therefore, the available narratives about his early life are often contradictory.

== Enlistment ==
Cashier first enlisted August 6, 1862, he enlisted in the 95th Illinois Infantry for a three-year term using the name "Albert D.J. Cashier" and was assigned to Company G. The Company Descriptive Book of the 95th shows the entry for Cashier, a 5'3" soldier, nineteen years old with blue eyes and auburn hair, weighing 110 pounds. (Note: Sources differ about how tall Cashier was. Some say 5'3" and others say 5 feet. In addition, Tsui claims Cashier was blue-eyed, with auburn hair and a fair complexion, while Clausius says "dark-haired".) Cashier easily passed the medical examination because it consisted of showing one's hands and feet. During the Civil War, many soldiers were young boys. He could not read or write and instead marked an X on the enlistment papers. His fellow soldiers recalled that he was reserved and preferred not to share a tent.

Many soldiers from Belvidere participated in the Battle of Shiloh as members of the Fifteenth Illinois Volunteers, where the Union had suffered heavy losses. Cashier took the train with others from Belvidere to Rockford in order to answer to the call for more soldiers. Along with others from Boone and McHenry counties, Cashier was trained to be an infantryman of the 95th Regiment at Camp Fuller in Rockford. After being shipped out by steamer and rail to Confederate strongholds in Columbus, Kentucky and Jackson, Tennessee, the 95th was ordered to Grand Junction where the regiment became part of the Army of the Tennessee under General Ulysses S. Grant.

== During the war ==
The regiment was part of the Army of the Tennessee under Ulysses S. Grant and fought in approximately forty battles, including the siege of Vicksburg. During this campaign, Cashier was captured while performing reconnaissance, but managed to escape and return to the regiment. In June 1863, still during the siege, he contracted chronic diarrhea and entered a military hospital, where his birth sex remained undiscovered.

In the second quarter of 1864, the regiment was also present at the Red River campaign under General Nathaniel Banks, and in June 1864 at the Battle of Brice's Cross Roads in Guntown, Mississippi, where they suffered heavy casualties.

Following a period to recuperate and regroup following the debacle at Brice, the 95th, now a seasoned and battle-hardened regiment, saw additional action in late 1864 through early 1865 in the Franklin–Nashville campaign, at the battles of Spring Hill and Franklin, the defense of Nashville, and the pursuit of General Hood.

During the war, the regiment traveled a total of about 9,000 miles. (Note: According to the regimental historian, the 95th had traveled 9,960 miles in three years of campaigns.) Other soldiers thought that Cashier was small and preferred to be alone, which were not uncommon characteristics for soldiers. Cashier fought with the regiment through the war in over 40 battles until he was honorably discharged on August 17, 1865, when all the soldiers were mustered out.

== Postwar ==
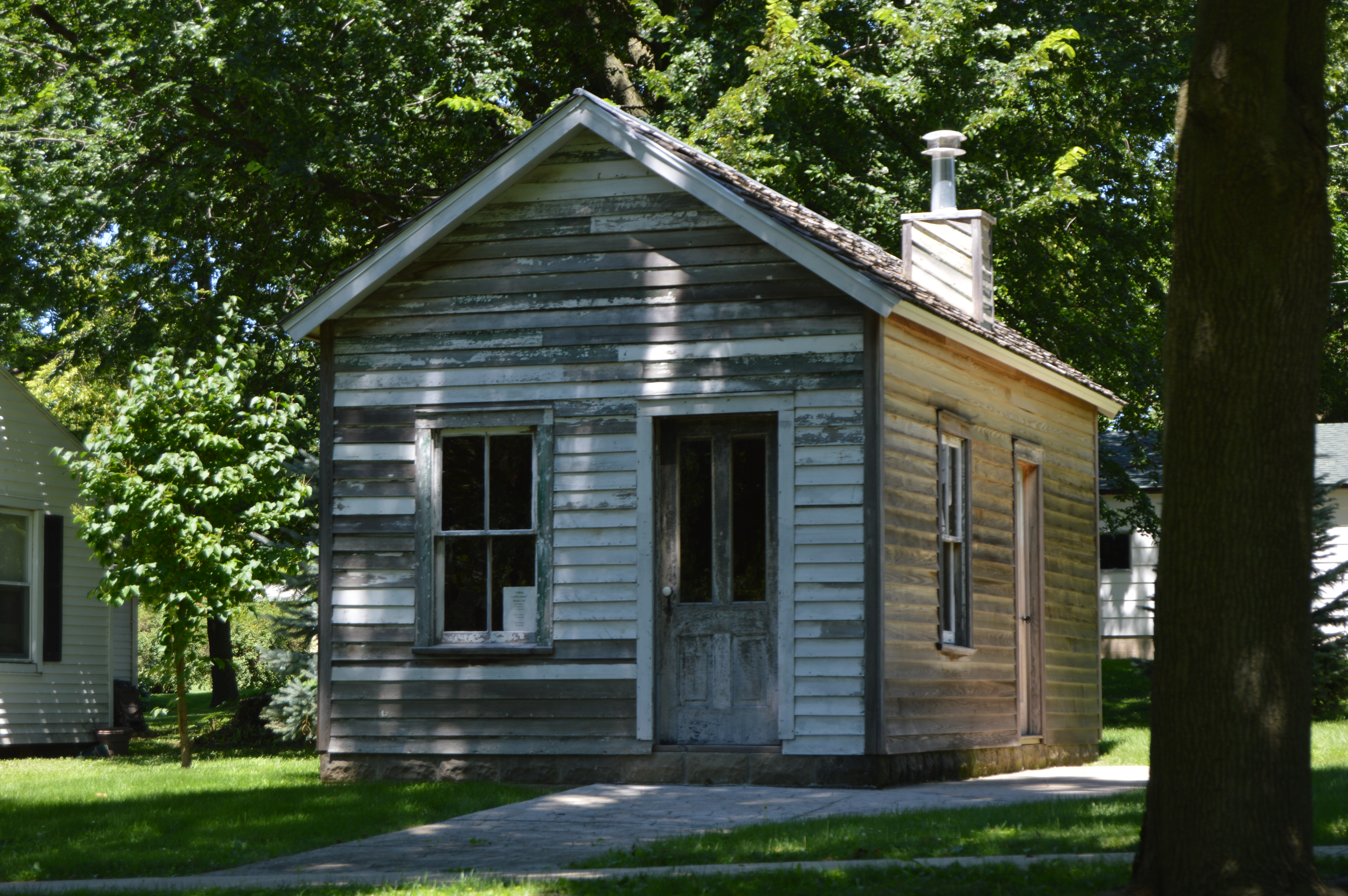
Cashier's postwar residence, since moved to Saunemin

After the war, Cashier returned to Belvidere, Illinois, for a time, working for Samuel Pepper and continuing to live as a man. Settling in Saunemin, Illinois, in 1869, he worked as a farmhand as well as performing odd jobs around the town, and can be found in the town payroll records. He lived with employer Joshua Chesbro and his family in exchange for work, and had also slept for a time in the Cording Hardware store in exchange for labor. In 1885, the Chesbro family had a small house built for Cashier. For over forty years, Cashier lived in Saunemin and was a church janitor, cemetery worker, and street lamplighter. Living as a man allowed Cashier to vote in elections and to later claim a veteran's pension under the same name. Pension payments started in 1907.

In later years, Cashier ate with the neighboring Lannon family. The Lannons discovered his birth sex when he fell ill, but decided not to make their discovery public.

In 1911, Cashier, who was working for state senator Ira Lish, was hit by the senator's car, resulting in a broken leg. A physician discovered his birth sex in the hospital, but did not disclose the information. No longer able to work, Cashier was moved to the Soldiers and Sailors home in Quincy, Illinois, on May 5, 1911. Many friends and fellow soldiers from the Ninety-fifth Regiment visited. He lived there until an obvious deterioration of mind began to take place, and was subsequently moved to the Watertown State Hospital for the Insane in East Moline, Illinois, in March 1914. Attendants at the Watertown State Hospital discovered his birth sex, at which point he was made to wear women's clothes again after more than fifty years of dressing as male. In 1914, there was an investigation to ascertain if the person posing as Albert Cashier truly was the veteran in question; former comrades confirmed that Cashier was in fact the person who had fought in the Civil War and the board decided in February 1915 that payments should continue for life.

== Death and legacy ==
Albert Cashier died on October 10, 1915, and was buried in uniform. The government supplied the typical small gravestone used to mark a veteran's resting place which was inscribed "Albert D. J. Cashier, Co. G, 95 Ill. Inf." He was given an official Grand Army of the Republic funerary service, and was buried with full military honors. It took W. J. Singleton (executor of Cashier's estate) nine years to track his identity back to the birth name of Jennie Hodgers. None of the would-be heirs proved convincing, and the estate of about $282 (after payment of funeral expenses) was deposited in the Adams County, Illinois treasury. In 1977 local residents erected a larger second headstone, inscribed with both names, on the same plot at Sunny Slope cemetery in Saunemin, Illinois.

Cashier is listed on the internal wall of the Illinois memorial at Vicksburg National Military Park.

A musical entitled The Civility of Albert Cashier has been produced based on his life; the work was described by the Chicago Tribune as "A timely musical about a trans soldier". Also Known As Albert D. J. Cashier: The Jennie Hodgers Story is a biography written by veteran Lon P. Dawson, who lived at the Illinois Veterans Home where Cashier once lived. The novel My Last Skirt, by Lynda Durrant, is based on his life. He was mentioned in a collection of essays called Nine Irish Lives, in which his biography was written by Jill McDonough.

In Michael Leali's 2022 young adult novel, The Civil War of Amos Abernathy, Cashier stands in for a pen pal.

Cashier's one-room house is now a historic site. The house served as a tool shed and nursery for hatchling chickens at one point and was relocated eight times in 137 years. In 1982, members of the local Women's Club moved it back to Saunemin with plans to display it that never fully materialized. After this it was so dilapidated that local firefighters planned to burn it down as a training exercise. Former Pontiac tourism director Betty Estes rescued it in 1996 hours before the firefighters could set it ablaze. She relocated the house to Pontiac, and utilized it as a streets department shed. Later on, volunteers such as local historian and village board member Al Arnolts meticulously restored the house. "We built a new framework and put it back together," Arnolts said. "The shake shingles that are on the roof came from a cedar tree right here in town." The newly restored home was dedicated in a ceremony in August 2011.

Authors including Michael Bronski, Jason Cromwell, Kirstin Cronn-Mills, and Nicholas Teich have suggested or argued that Cashier was a trans man due to living as a man for at least 53 years.

== See also ==
- Amelio Robles Ávila, Mexican revolutionary
- Christian Davies
- James Barry (surgeon)
- John/Eleanor Rykener
- Hannah Snell
- Ralph Kerwineo
- Hua Mulan
