= Mahmoud Asgari and Ayaz Marhoni =

People executed by Iran by hanging

- Died: July 19, 2005; Mashhad, Iran
- Cause of death: Execution by hanging
- Conviction: Raping a 13-year-old boy
- Penalty: Death by hanging

Mahmoud Asgari (Persian: محمود عسگری), and Ayaz Marhoni (Persian: عیاض مرهونی), were Iranian teenagers from the province of Khorasan who were publicly hanged on July 19, 2005. Iranian officials say the teenagers were executed for raping a 13-year-old boy, while gay rights groups claim they were executed for "being homosexual". The case attracted international media attention and the facts of the case are heavily debated.

== Execution ==
Mahmoud Asgari and Ayaz Marhoni were executed on July 19, 2005, in Edalat (Justice) Square in Mashhad, northeast Iran, after being convicted by the court of having raped a 13-year-old boy. The case attracted international media attention and the facts of the case are heavily debated.

Shari'a (Islamic Law) in Shiite Iran prescribes the death penalty for homosexual acts but it requires four eyewitnesses to the event, but the Convention on the Rights of the Child, of which Iran is a signatory, forbids the execution of juveniles. According to Asgari's lawyer, Rohollah Razaz Zadeh, "death sentences handed to children by Iranian courts are supposed to be commuted to five years in jail", but the Supreme Court in Tehran upheld the death sentence. The ages of the two remain unclear, with some sources claiming they were fourteen and sixteen at the time of their arrests and sixteen and eighteen when executed, and others claiming that the older boy, Marhoni, was already nineteen, when the alleged crime(s) took place.

== Media reports and international reactions ==
On July 19, 2005, the Iranian Students' News Agency (ISNA) posted an article in Persian describing the execution of the two youths. Its headline stated that they had been executed for "lavat beh onf", which means "sodomy/homosexual sex by force" and is a legal term used for rape of men by men. Earlier on the morning of the executions, Quds, the local daily newspaper in Mashhad, published a report on the executions. It gave a detailed account of how the two had raped a 13-year-old boy, and included statements by the father of the rape victim.

The ISNA article became the center of the dispute. The gay-rights group, OutRage!, led by Peter Tatchell, published its own free translation of the article on July 21, suggesting that the two had been executed for engaging in consensual homosexual sex.

Two news sources heavily involved in Iranian exile politics had meanwhile contributed to the spread of the story in English. On July 20, 2005, an Iranian opposition group, the National Council of Resistance of Iran, the political wing of the People's Mojahedin, released a press release about the executions. It stated that: "The victims were charged with disrupting public order among other things." It did not mention the charges of rape. Iran Focus, a news website that is widely regarded as an affiliate of the People's Mojahedin, also published an article about the hangings, mentioning no charges at all.

On July 22, 2005, Amnesty International issued a news release saying:

"According to reports, they were convicted of sexual assault on a 13-year-old boy and had been detained 14 months ago. Prior to their execution, the two were also given 228 lashes each for drinking, disturbing the peace and theft."

On July 27, 2005, after researching reports on the hangings, Human Rights Watch released letters to Iran's president and the head of the judiciary. In writing to the Iranian leadership, Human Rights Watch condemned the use of the death penalty in Iran. It stated that the two "were put to death on July 19 after they were found guilty of sexually assaulting a thirteen-year-old boy some fourteen months earlier," but did not address whether those charges were accurate. Its public statement noted:

"Death is an inhumane punishment, particularly for someone under eighteen at the time of his crimes," said Hadi Ghaemi, Iran researcher for Human Rights Watch. "All but a handful of countries forbid such executions. Iran should as well."

In Tehran, Nobel Peace laureate Shirin Ebadi decried the imposition of the death penalty on minors but did not comment on the nature of the charges in this case.

The first reports in the Iranian media had all identified the hangings as the result of a rape conviction. However, these reports only came to light after later English-language accounts had suggested the two might have been killed for being gay. This made it appear plausible to some that the rape charges might have been simply a "cover story" put out later by the Iranian government—even though the story of rape had actually been the first one told. Several bloggers promoted the story heavily and gave wide coverage to the pictures of the hanging. U.S. blogger Doug Ireland referred to the charges of rape as "the Iranian government's story."

The hangings quickly became a political issue in disputes over U.S. and European policy toward Iran. The conservative U.S. commentator Andrew Sullivan posted the photographs in an entry on his blog called "Islamists versus Gays." Seeing the hangings as a reason gay people should support U.S. military action, he quoted a gay U.S. soldier who wrote him that:

"Your post on the Islamo-fascist hanging/murder of the two gay men confirmed for me that my recent decision to join the U.S. military was correct. I have to stuff myself back in the closet – something I thought I left a decade ago – but our war on terror trumps my personal comfort at this point. Whenever my friends and family criticize – I'll show 'em that link."

The Log Cabin Republicans, a conservative U.S. gay group, issued a statement reading, "In the wake of news stories and photographs documenting the hanging of two gay Iranian teenagers, Log Cabin Republicans re-affirm their commitment to the global war on terror."

== Reason for prosecution ==
The British group OutRage! alleged that the two had been executed for engaging in consensual homosexual sex. However, some human rights organizations, including Human Rights Watch and the International Gay and Lesbian Human Rights Commission, have urged observers to refrain from casting the incident as a "gay" issue, and cast doubt on the claim that Marhoni and Asgari were hanged as a result of consensual acts. They have emphasized instead that the executions are a violation of the UN Convention on the Rights of the Child and the International Covenant on Civil and Political Rights (Iran is a signatory to both), which prohibit the execution of minors.

OutRage! stated that "the allegation of sexual assault may either be a trumped up charge to undermine public sympathy for the youths, a frequent tactic by the Islamist regime in Iran" or that "it may be that the 13 year old was a willing participant, but that Iranian law (like UK law) deems that no person of that age is capable of sexual consent and that therefore any sexual contact is automatically deemed in law to be a sex assault."

OutRage! also questioned why the 13-year-old was not identified and also put on trial if he had been sexually assaulted. The two were believed to have been juveniles at the time of the offense, and one is believed to have been a juvenile at the time of his execution. Iran frequently executes people for offenses committed as children, a practice condemned by international human rights treaties.

The facts of the case are still subject to heated debate. The British activist Peter Tatchell has accused activists who have suggested the two were charged with rape of being "Western left-wing and Islamist apologists" of the "Iranian regime." Some of the reports that were first used to discredit the rape charges originated with an Iranian dissident group accused of serious human-rights violations, one that is classified as a terrorist organization by the United States and Iran (the National Council of Resistance of Iran).

== Controversy ==
Within weeks of the hangings, both reporters and human rights organizations—while continuing to condemn the brutality of the hangings—began to produce more nuanced accounts. The U.S. periodical The Nation published a lengthy investigation of the story. It criticized the role of Peter Tatchell and OutRage! in spreading the belief the executed youths were gay before it had examined the evidence. The article concluded that, given Tatchell's "recent statements, it seems likely that his ideological disposition caused him to look past or dismiss information that cast doubt on the 'gay teenagers' story."

Faisal Alam, founder of the lesbian and gay Muslim group Al-Fatiha Foundation, published an opinion piece claiming that: "Very few people took the time to research the details of the case or even consult with experts who deal with such news on a daily basis. In fact it was almost a week later that we began to read more accurate accounts of why the teens were executed from international human rights groups including Amnesty International, Human Rights Watch and the International Gay and Lesbian Human Rights Commission – all of whom have contacts in Iran and ways to confirm news of such incidents from independent sources. While no one will ever know why these two young men were executed in Iran, what remains clear is that the hysteria surrounding the executions was enormous and only fed to the growing Islamaphobia and hatred towards Muslims and the Islamic world."

OutRage! and Peter Tatchell continued to defend their claim that the two victims were hanged because they were lovers. It accused them of being "apologists" and of giving the "Iranian government the benefit of the doubt." Other gay and human rights groups that had researched the case had condemned the killings as gross rights violations. Nonetheless, Brett Lock of OutRage! wrote that those groups "showed little concern" about human rights violations in Iran:

"OutRage! is appalled that large sections of liberal and left opinion in the West shows little concern regarding the murderous brutality of the clerical fascist regime in Tehran. We deplore the gullibility of many gay, left and human rights groups concerning the abuse of LGBT human rights in Iran.... They have long swallowed Iran's homophobic propaganda."

Tatchell accused those who disagreed with him over the case of "racism." OutRage! cited the case to "urge the international community to treat Iran as a pariah state." Tatchell stated, "There can be no normal relations with an abnormal regime".

OutRage! and blogger Doug Ireland cited sources inside Iran to support their continuing assertion that Mahmoud Asgari and Ayaz Marhoni were hanged solely for being gay. Their source is Somalia-born activist Afdhere Jama, who lives in San Francisco in the U.S. According to OutRage!, Jama has told them that he has spoken to three people from Mashhad who maintain that Mahmoud Asgari, Ayaz Marhoni, and five other friends were originally accused of committing consensual homosexual acts on each other.

Scott Long of Human Rights Watch noted in 2006 that Afdhere Jama's sources "have refused to speak to anyone else, including human rights investigators," and that allegations of a huge crackdown against gay people in Iran based on their evidence are third-hand at best. Long also criticised Doug Ireland for "deeply irresponsible" reporting by accepting second-hand claims from Iranian exile groups without confirmation. Long wrote:

A few Iranian exile groups saw a new audience in Western gays. They began reporting multiple executions in Iran as gay-related... After four men were hanged for unspecified "sexual offenses" in Iran, Ireland found verbal similarity in the reporting enough to "strongly suggest" that they were hanged for homosexuality. The men were hanged for heterosexual rape – two for the rape of girls aged 8 and 10. When I made this clear to Ireland, he never qualified his earlier claim.

In addition to Human Rights Watch, Paula Ettelbrick, executive director of the International Gay and Lesbian Human Rights Commission, has also said "It was not a gay case." Ettelbrick has also said she was also disturbed by the charged language used by some gay rights groups to condemn the execution, pointing to Peter Tatchell's statement, "This is just the latest barbarity by the Islamo-fascists in Iran."

== Aftermath ==
Both Sweden and The Netherlands responded to the stories around the Mashhad executions by announcing that they would immediately halt extraditions of LGBT asylum claimants to Iran. The Dutch government also announced that its Ministry of Foreign Affairs would investigate the treatment of gays and lesbians in the country. Civil rights groups in the U.S., United Kingdom and Russia have also called for similar policies.

In March 2006 Dutch Immigration Minister Rita Verdonk proposed an end to a moratorium on deporting gay asylum-seekers to Iran, stating that it was now clear "that there is no question of executions or death sentences based solely on the fact that a defendant is gay", adding that homosexuality was never the primary charge against people. Under parliamentary pressure, and based on evidence from groups including Human Rights Watch that torture of gays in Iran remained endemic, she was forced to extend the moratorium on deportation for a further six months. In late 2006, also due to lobbying from groups including Human Rights Watch, the Netherlands instituted a new policy of removing the burden of proof from Iranian LGBT refugee claimants.

Scott Long of Human Rights Watch has written that "lesbian and gay Iranians are not abstractions, sheltered from politics—or missiles. Their lives should not be reduced to the agendas of well-meaning strangers in the West." He added, criticizing allegations he considered unsupported, that "If we want to challenge Iran's government, we need facts. There is enough proof of torture and repression that we can do without claims of 'pogroms.'"

In 2006, the one-year anniversary of the hangings in Mashhad was designated an International Day of Action Against Homophobic Persecution in Iran by OutRage!, with vigils planned for Amsterdam, Berlin, Brussels, Chicago, Fort Lauderdale, Frankfurt, London, Marseille, Mexico City, Moscow, New York, San Diego, San Francisco, Seattle, Stockholm, Toronto, Vancouver, Vienna, Warsaw, Washington, D.C., and other cities and with hearings planned in the British House of Commons. These demonstrations saw a renewal of controversy over whether the claims made about the case by OutRage! had any basis in fact.

The New York Times reported that ISNA, the student news agency, carried photographs of the execution. The Washington Post reported that photographs of the hangings were carried by protestors at rallies and demonstrations at over two dozen events worldwide.

== Cultural references ==
- The album Fundamental by the British musical group Pet Shop Boys is "Dedicated to Mahmoud Asgari and Ayaz Marhoni".
- R. Timothy Brady composed an opera, Edalat Square, based on this act. The opera won the 2008 Opera Vista Festival, and was performed at the 2009 Opera Vista Festival in Houston, TX, and was conducted by Viswa Subbaraman.
- Jay Paul Deratany wrote the play Haram! Iran! about the trial and executions of Ayaz Marhoni and Mahmoud Asgari; it was first performed by the Athenaeum Theatre in Chicago.

== Use of the execution photograph ==
A photograph of the teens' execution has been used for various purposes: Dutch right-wing political figure Geert Wilders used it in his short film Fitna as a warning of what would happen to gays in a dystopian future in which Muslims rule the Netherlands, and it has been misrepresented in social media as Palestinians rather than Iranians hanging homosexuals.

Former Iranian President Mahmoud Ahmadinejad was shown the photograph during a 2008 interview and was asked if he thought "gay men and lesbians should die in Iran?" Ahmadinejad answered: "No, there is no law for their execution in Iran. Either they were drug traffickers or they had killed someone else. Those who kill someone else or engage in acts of rape could be punished by execution. Otherwise, homosexuals are not even known who they are to be hung. So, we don't have executions of homosexuals."

In the United States, black-and-white reproductions of the photographs were brought by protesters to a rally in Dupont Circle, and the images were also used in at least 26 other protests in countries around the world, according to those who organized them. Before they closed, the pictures had also been put on display in the windows of Lambda Rising, an LGBT bookstore in Washington, D.C.

Nobel Peace Prize winner Shirin Ebadi, an Iranian known for her human rights work, and the founder of Defenders of Human Rights Center protested against the execution of minors. Philip Kennicott, winner of the Pulitzer Prize for Criticism, wrote in The Washington Post that "perhaps the saddest thing about these pictures is that no major news organization outside Iran has tracked down what really happened. The final indignity of these boys' short lives was that they didn't matter enough to spark a serious investigation."

== See also ==
- Judicial system of Iran
- LGBT in Islam
- LGBT rights in Iran
