= Rex Wockner =

American freelance journalist (born 1957)

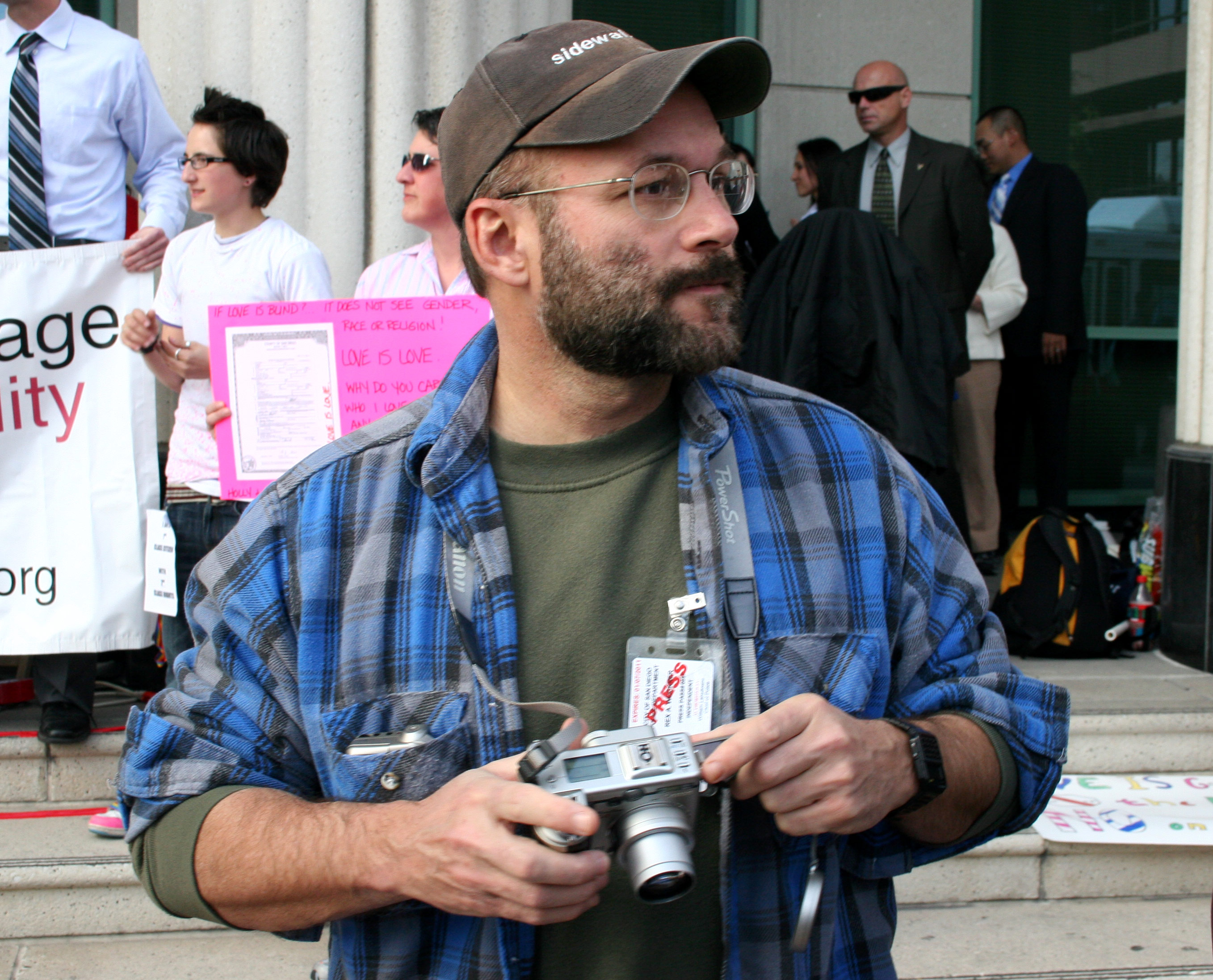
- Occupation: journalist
- Writing career
- Period: late 20th/early 21st century
- Genres: news reporting, essays, magazine articles
- Subject: LGBT rights movement
- Website: www.wockner.com

Rex Wockner (born 1957) is an American freelance journalist who has reported news for the gay press and mainstream periodicals since 1985. His work has appeared in more than 325 gay publications in 38 countries.

== Career ==
Wockner earned a bachelor of arts degree in journalism from Drake University in Des Moines, Iowa, and began his reporting career in radio.

Wockner has made a specialty of covering gay and lesbian news stories from around the world. Wockner traveled to Denmark to report on the world's first same-sex civil unions in 1989, and likewise covered the world's first same-sex marriages in the Netherlands in 2001. Wockner also reported from the scene on the first gay pride events in Moscow and Leningrad in 1991, and has reported extensively on gay rights movements in the former East Bloc and developing countries, as well as from the International Lesbian and Gay Association world conferences and international AIDS conferences.

In the United States, Wockner has reported on many political and social developments affecting LGBT people, including coverage of the political conventions of the Democratic Party and the Republican Party, NLGJA conferences, the GLAAD Awards, and major ACT UP demonstrations.

Wockner's journalism has included a weekly 1,000-word roundup of gay news from outside the United States, a weekly 700-word opinion column called The Wockner Wire, and a biweekly roundup of gay quotables called Quote Unquote. In 1998, Wockner had 91 subscribers to his international news feed, prompting PlanetOut chairman Tom Rielly to call Wockner a "one-man gay AP (Associated Press)".

Wockner was the subject of a biographical article in Completely Queer: The Gay and Lesbian Encyclopedia (1998). He was also one of the discussion participants for the 2002 book Bears on Bears: Interviews and Discussions by Ron Suresha. Wockner currently lives in San Diego.

Wockner is a lapsed Catholic and former seminarian.

== Bibliography ==
- Hogan, Steve, and Lee Hudson. Completely Queer: The Gay and Lesbian Encyclopedia. New York: Holt, 1998. ISBN 0-8050-6031-6
- Suresha, Ron Jackson. Bears on Bears: Interviews and Discussions. Los Angeles: Alyson, 2002. ISBN 1-55583-578-3
