= Howl of the Devil =

Spanish horror film

Howl of the Devil a.k.a El aullido del diablo
- Directed by: Paul Naschy
- Written by: Paul Naschy
- Produced by: Augusto Boué, John Freemont, Paul Naschy
- Starring: Paul Naschy; Caroline Munro; Howard Vernon
- Cinematography: Julio Burgos
- Edited by: José Antonio Rojo
- Music by: Fernando García Morcillo
- Running time: 97 minutes
- Country: Spain
- Language: Spanish

Howl of the Devil (Spanish: El aullido del diablo) is a Spanish horror film written, directed by and starring Paul Naschy, along with Caroline Munro, Howard Vernon, and Naschy's son Sergio Molina (credited as Serg Mills). The film was finished in 1988 (according to its copyright date) and intended as a comeback vehicle for Naschy (who had not headlined a film since 1984), but due to various factors never received any significant theatrical release and was widely unavailable until 2021.

The film is notable for providing Naschy—famed as the "Spanish Lon Chaney"—an opportunity to briefly portray a wide variety of classic horror characters, including Quasimodo, Frankenstein's Monster, Mr. Hyde, The Phantom of the Opera, Grigori Rasputin, Fu Manchu, Bluebeard, The Devil and his own iconic character Waldemar Daninsky from the Hombre Lobo films.

== Plot ==
Theatrical actor Hector Doriani lives in the former house of his recently-dead brother, famed horror actor Alex Doriani, along with Alex's son Adrián, Alex's loyal butler Eric, and the spirited maid Carmen. With the help of Eric, Hector picks up itinerant women as part of an elaborate sexual roleplay where he approaches them in various villainous costumes. The women end up dead soon afterward, victims of a mysterious black-gloved killer.

The beautiful Carmen, however, rebuffs Hector's various advances, despite her work for Hector drawing the sexual jealousy of local priest Father Damián, with whom she previously had a brief affair. Father Damián employs the alcoholic Zacarías to hang around the estate and spy on Carmen, and the two begin to suspect something dangerous is underfoot. Carmen, however, is more afraid of them, dreaming of the two of them arriving masked at the estate to murder her.

Meanwhile, Hector's orphaned nephew Adrián is routinely mistreated by his mercurial uncle, and begins to experience visions of his horror-star father returning in various classic horror film guises (including Frankenstein's Monster, Mr. Hyde, The Phantom of the Opera, Quasimodo, and Waldemar Daninsky [from Paul Naschy's own Hombre Lobo series]. These visions of his father seem to indicate that he may be resurrected, and Eric's various occult sessions suggest the same.

Eventually, during a violent thunderstorm, Carmen seeks out Hector and embraces him. While they have sex, the killer enters the room and impales them both. The killer is revealed to be Adrián, who knows that his uncle (along with his mother) murdered his father, and believes that this act will resurrect him. Indeed, Alex's rotting corpse does return to the house, and after killing Father Damián and Eric, reveals that he is possessed by The Devil and that Adrián is the Antichrist, with the various murdered women (as well as Hector and Carmen) serving as the Four Horsemen of the Apocalypse.

== Cast ==
- Paul Naschy as Hector Doriani / Alex Doriani / Frankenstein's Monster / Mr. Hyde / Phantom of the Opera / Waldemar Daninsky the Werewolf / Quasimodo / Bluebeard / The Devil / Fu Manchu / Rasputin
- Caroline Munro as Carmen
- Howard Vernon as Eric
- Sergio Molina as Adrián (credited as Serg Mills)
- Fernando Hilbeck as Father Damián
- Cris Huerta as Zacarías

== Production ==
After suffering a number of personal and professional setbacks, including the financial failure of his 1984 film Operación Mantis (El exterminio del macho) which led to the bankruptcy of his production company Aconito Films and the retirement of his friend and frequent co-star Julia Saly, and the death of his father in the same year, Paul Naschy's once-busy cinematic output had slowed considerably. Howl of The Devil (known in Spanish as El aullido del diablo) was planned as a comeback vehicle for the horror icon, intended to showcase his love of classic horror cinema, particularly the Classic Universal Monsters. The finished film opens with an on-screen dedication declaring it a "pelicula de modesto homenaje a LON CHANEY, BORIS KARLOFF, BELA LUGOSI, JACK PIERCE, y todos aquellos que con su talento cimentaron "LA UNIVERSAL" creado esos entranables mitos que viviran para siempre en el recuerdo de los autenticos amantes al Cine Fantastico" (emphasis his), roughly translating to "a film of modest homage to Lon Chaney, Boris Karloff, Bela Lugosi, Jack Pierce, and all those who with their talent cemented Universal Studios's legacy of creating those endearing myths that will live forever in the memory of authentic lovers of Fantastic Cinema." Naschy had been fascinated by the Universal Horror Cycle since seeing 1943's Frankenstein Meets the Wolf Man as a child, and explained in interview contemporary to Howl of the Devil's production that "as a filmmaker I do have influences. There are two powerful ones: German expressionism and the American Universal Studios above all. To me, these are two pivotal movements in the history of fantasy films." The makeup effects were created by Fernando Florido, a veteran effects artist who had worked with Naschy several times previously.

Due to Naschy playing a former horror actor, the film has been seen to have autiobiographical elements, including elements of Self-criticism. It includes a scene where Sergio Molina's character watches a clip of Naschy's 1983 film Panic Beats, which in context implies a direct comparison between Naschy's career and his character Alex Doriani.

Producer Augusto Boué, in a contemporary interview, described the film's budget as "relatively modest" and praised Naschy's frugality and resourcefulness as a director. Nevertheless, the production was beset with problems, including a stomach illness which swept the cast and crew, and an incident when an exploding dummy brought police officers concerned there had been a terrorist bombing. Naschy said of the production that "...it was hell. I had a really hard time... it's a cursed film. One of those which are doomed before they are even made." The film was initially shot in English, with even the Spanish actors reciting their lines in phonetic English for later dubbing (a common practice at the time) before the difficulty of the process caused Naschy, who was not fluent in English himself, to give up the idea and shoot the remainder of the film in Spanish. It was never dubbed in English, which limited its commercial viability in English-language markets.

The film was the subject of some dispute over the screenplay; a man named Salvador Sáinz, who had previously contacted Naschy to propose a collaboration, later variously claimed that he had co-written the film or that Naschy had stolen it from him. Naschy vigorously disputed these claims and described Sáinz as "an absolutely demented person besides being a liar." IMDb currently lists Sáinz as an uncredited co-writer despite the lack of evidence for his involvement.

== Release ==
Due to various factors, including the sudden death of one of its producers, the film became embroiled in legal disputes and never received any significant theatrical release. The program for the 1989 Fantasy Filmfest lists it as showing on the night of October 20, 1989; it is unclear if it actually did screen. It premiered in Spain on local Spanish TV, never received an official VHS release, and remained essentially unavailable outside low-quality bootlegs until it was released on Blu-ray by Mondo Macabro in 2021.
