= Licántropo =

- Spanish theatrical release poster
- Directed by: Francisco Rodríguez Gordillo
- Written by: Paul Naschy (as Jacinto Molina)
- Produced by: Primitivo Rodriguez
- Starring: Paul Naschy; Amparo Muñoz; Antonio Pica
- Cinematography: Manuel Mateos
- Music by: José Ignacio Cuenca; Tomky de la Pena
- Distributed by: Videokine
- Release date: 1997
- Running time: 91 minutes
- Country: Spain
- Language: Spanish

Licántropo, also known as Licantropo: The Moonlight Murders or Lycanthrope: The Full Moon Killer, is a 1996 Spanish horror film that is the 11th in the "Hombre Lobo" series about the werewolf Count Waldemar Daninsky, played by Paul Naschy. Following his near-fatal heart attack in 1991, Naschy wrote the screenplay for this film as a sort of therapy while he was recuperating from his surgery. He filed it away for future use and the script lay dormant until producer Primitivo Rodriguez contacted Naschy in 1996 and asked him if he had any ideas for a new horror movie.

This was Naschy's last Waldemar Daninsky film to be theatrically released and filmed in Spain. The film was made as an intended comeback for Naschy, but it was carelessly directed, poorly distributed and received generally bad reviews. Romana Gonzalez handled the werewolf makeup effects. The film was only released in Spain in April 1997 and not in any other country outside of Spain. It was however shown at the Madrid International Film Festival in 1997, where Naschy was given a Best Actor award.

This film was followed by the 12th, and final, film in the Hombre Lobo series, a 2004 direct-to-video film entitled Tomb of the Werewolf (which Naschy filmed in Hollywood).

== Plot ==
In 1944 Europe, a gypsy named Czinka is having an affair with a Nazi SS officer named Heinrich, and she learns that she is pregnant. The elders of her tribe tell her she is going to give birth to triplets, and that the third child to be born will be a lycanthrope. The Nazi officer is killed, but Czinka still gives birth to the triplets, and her tribal leader puts the third child (named Waldemar) up for adoption with a well-to-do family named the Daninskys, hoping that his upper class upbringing will balance out his lycanthropic tendencies as he grows older.

Fifty years pass. Waldemar Daninsky is now a well-to-do, aging writer who is now happily married with a wife and two children. He begins to suffer severe bodily pains that seem related to the cycle of the full moon and thinking he may be a candidate for a heart attack, he seeks the advice of some doctors, including Dr. Mina Westenra, who performs a number of tests on Waldemar and can find nothing wrong with him. She tells him to rest and try to reduce his stress level.

Soon after, a series of grisly murders hit the area. The police think an animal is doing the killings since the corpses are so badly mutilated, but some of the murders appear to have been done by a human serial killer. Waldemar has begun transforming into a werewolf on the nights of the full moon, and he has been killing people, but a deranged Catholic priest is also committing murders in the area, trying to eliminate young people who he considers immoral "sinners". Waldemar kills his wife and son during one of his wild rampages, and when he realizes what he has done, he is horrified.

Finally, Waldemar and the priest wind up confronting each other inside Waldemar's home after the priest comes there to kill Waldemar's daughter Kinga. Waldemar turns into a werewolf and battles the serial killer priest on his front lawn, in hand-to-fang combat. After Waldemar kills the priest, Dr. Mina Westenra puts Waldemar out of his misery by shooting him with silver bullets.

== Cast ==
- Paul Naschy as Waldemar Daninsky
- Amparo Munoz as Dr. Mina Westenra
- Antonio Pica as Commissioner Lacombe
- Jesus Calle as Inspector Demage
- Jose Maria Caffarel as Dr. Jeremy Westernra
- Eva Isanta as Kinga Daninsky, Waldemar's daughter
- Luis Maluenda as Reverend Jonathan Leroux
- Jorge R. Lucas as Laurent Leroux, Jonathan's son
- Pablo Scola as Bruno, Ruth's boyfriend
- Marcos Ortiz as Louis
- Javier Loyola as Bigary, the head of the gypsy village
- Rosa Fontana as Elsa Daninsky, Waldemar's wife
- Ester Ponce as Czinka, Waldemar's mother
- Jose Truchado as Rom, Waldemar's uncle
- Bill Holden as Colonel Wolfstein, Waldemar's father
- Carmen Mosquera as Ruth
- Julio Pimentel as Sargento Blucher
- Rory Mullen as Lt. Adolf
