= José María Zabalza =

Spanish screenwriter and film director

- Born: 1928; Irún Spain
- Died: 1985 (aged 56–57); Madrid, Spain
- Education: Bachelor's in economics and bachelor's in film directing (I.I.E.C.)
- Alma mater: Universidad Complutense de Madrid, Escuela Oficial de Cine de España (IIEC)
- Occupations: Film director, screenwriter, director and theater writer
- Years active: 1955-1985 (film)
- Spouse: Ana Satrova

José María Zabalza (1928–1985) was a Spanish screenwriter and film director.

== Biography ==
Graduate in the Faculty of Political and Economic Sciences of Madrid, and after practicing for a short period as an economist, he decides to present himself to the newly inaugurated I.I.E.C. (Institute of Investigations and Cinematographic Experiences), official school of cinema that opened its doors in February 1947. Zabalza passed the entrance exam in the specialty of direction for which there were only five places. His classmates in promotion (which was the second promotion of the school) were Ricardo Muñoz Suay, Jesús Franco and Juan García Atienza. In those days the students Jose Gutierrez Maesso, Luis Garcia Berlanga, Florentino Soria and Eduardo Ducay were also part of the school.

Jose Maria Zabalza was a precursor in the founding of production companies in the Basque country. In 1955 he founded the production company Haz Films. With Haz Films he filmed There is Also Sky Over The Sea (1955) and Burial of an Official in Spring (1958).

Zabalza's professional startup style as a filmmaker was clearly and markedly within what has been called author's cinema or art house cinema. There is Also Sky Over The Sea was probably one of the first films inspired by Italian Neorealism in Spain and the first ever in the Basque country. And as Luis Garcia Berlanga said many times: "Burial of an Official in Spring was the first film of dark humor cinema era in Spain".

The difficulties with the classification of premiere and distribution, by the Francoist censorship and the General Secretariat of Cinematography and Theater, did not allow an adequate distribution of these two films. This makes the newly created production company Haz Films close. José María Zabalza decides to work in the theater in order to continue with his artistic career. During this time, he wrote and directed several plays: Camerino Sin Biombo (1959), Autopsia de María Magdalena (1960), Las arañas travel by night (1961), Pensión Rosita (1962) and Ginebra for Dinner (1962).

In 1963, Zabalza reached an agreement to direct his first film with a production company that is not of his property. The film had the provisional title of The noise of the silence, to later take the definitive title, and supposedly more commercial one, of I am not a murderer (1963). The film as its first title indicated formally works with silence and long shots. Zabalza was inspired by the cinema of Ingmar Bergman and Michelangelo Antonioni, once again focusing on a style of European auteur cinema, revealing his inveterate cinephilia. Another strong feature that is shown in his films after his first three feature films is the combination of professional actors of great name with non-professional actors, people recruited on the street or among their friends. The film takes place in natural settings of Hondarribia, Irún and Zarautz.

In 1964, he founded the Uranzu Films production company with his friend Carlos Serrano Tell (father of the filmmaker Carlos Serrano Azcona) and entered a second stage of his career as a filmmaker. With it he decides to recover a little from the difficulties of distribution suffered by his first films. His artistic line becomes lighter and commercial comedy type of film, except Camerino without a screen that is an intimate film filmed in San Sebastian in interiors with the actress Gemma Cuervo.

After several films made with Uranzu Films' Carlos Serrano Tell decides to leave his tasks as a producer to be able to focus fully on his profession and his family life. The move away from cinema of his partner in Uranzu Films supposes to a great extent a change in the career of Zabalza that was dedicated thereafter to the cinema of genre mainly as a hired director. You can consider this the third stage in his filmography. In this stage, Zabalza shot a large number of films in genres as disparate as the Spaghetti Western, horror movies, gangster movies or soft erotic films. Some of these films belong to the era in which international co-productions were lavished, with several films shot in the former Yugoslavia. Perhaps the most internationally well-known film is the cult film he shot with horror film actor Paul Naschy, The Fury of the Wolfman (filmed in early 1970). Naschy said in interviews that Zabalza was an alcoholic when he worked with him on that film, and claimed Zabalza completed ruined his screenplay. This portion of his filmography was not exempt from personal difficulties, and for some of these low budget films he came to be regarded as the Spanish Ed Wood. He got to shoot three films at once. He shot one in 24 hours with 12 cameras, entitled The Return of the Vampires (1972) with Simon Andreu that never received a commercial premiere until 1985, due once again to the Francoist censorship in Spain, (it was later released as The Mystery of Cynthia Baird).

Zabalza as a filmmaker certainly fell into oblivion, but in recent years he has lived a renewed recognition with the publication of the book José María Zabalza: Cinema, Bohemia and Survival (2011) by Gurutz Albisu, and the documentary film about his cinema and his life, Director Z: el vendedor de ilusiones by Oskar Tejedor, which premiered at the Festival Internacional de Cine Sitges.

== Filmography ==
1. 1985 El misterio de Cynthia Baird
2. 1984 La de Troya en el Palmar
3. 1983 Al oeste de Río Grande
4. 1978 Aberri Eguna 78
5. 1975 Divorcio a la andaluza
6. 1974 Un torero para la historia
7. 1972 The Fury of the Wolfman
8. 1971 El vendedor de ilusiones
9. 1971 20,000 dólares por un cadáver
10. 1970 Bullets over Dallas
11. 1970 Rebels of Arizona
12. 1969 El regreso de Al Capone
13. 1969 Homicidios en Chicago
14. 1967 El milagro del cante
15. 1967 Camerino Without a Folding Screen
16. 1966 Algunas lecciones de amor
17. 1965 Julieta engaña a Romeo
18. 1964 Dammed pistols of Dallas
19. 1963 Yo no soy un asesino
20. 1958 Entierro de un funcionario en primavera
21. 1955 También hay cielo sobre el mar

== Theater ==
1. 1962 Ginebra para cenar
2. 1962 Pensión Rosita
3. 1961 Las arañas viajan de noche
4. 1960 Autopsia de María Magdalena
5. 1959 Camerino Without a Folding Screen

== Bibliography ==
- Peter Cowie & Derek Elley. World Filmography: 1967. Fairleigh Dickinson University Press, 1977.
