= Horror Rises from the Tomb =

- Spanish film poster
- Directed by: Carlos Aured
- Written by: Paul Naschy
- Produced by: Modesto Pérez Redondo; Ricardo Munoz Suay; Jose Antonio Perez Giner
- Starring: Paul Naschy; Emma Cohen; Helga Line; Victor Alcazar; Luis Ciges; Maria Jose Cantudo
- Cinematography: Manuel Merino
- Edited by: Javier Morán
- Music by: Carmelo A. Bernaola
- Production company: Profilmes S.A.
- Distributed by: Avco Embassy; Mercator Filmverleih; Jeme Films
- Release dates: April 27, 1973 (Spain); 1974 (U.S. Cable TV)
- Running time: 89 minutes
- Country: Spain
- Language: Spanish

Horror Rises from the Tomb (Spanish: El espanto surge de la tumba), is a 1973 Spanish horror film starring Paul Naschy and directed by Carlos Aured. Leon Klimovsky was Naschy's first choice of director, but he was busy with another film so his assistant director Carlos Aured took the job. Naschy was mercilessly rushed into writing the screenplay for the producers in 36 hours, yet after the film was completed, it took more than a year to get it released in theaters. The film was shot in February 1972, and was only released in Spain and Mexico on April 27, 1973, as El espanto surge de la tumba. The film was released in Germany on October 4, 1974, as Blutmesse fur der Teufel/ Blood Mass for the Devil. They re-released the film in Germany on Sept. 2, 1980, as Blood Mass of the Zombies in an attempt to cash in on George Romero's hit film Dawn of the Dead. In France, the film was retitled L'amour parmi les monstres (Love Among the Monsters).

The film was released directly to Cable TV in the U.S. in 1974 as Horror Rises from the Tomb (the same censored version that was shown in Spain and Mexico). Only when BCI released the film on DVD years later were fans finally able to see the complete, unedited international version. It was released on a DVD from BCI which included audio commentary tracks as well as on a Blu-ray from Shout Factory as part of their Paul Naschy Collection.

The film introduced Naschy's character of Alaric de Marnac, an executed warlock who returns to life centuries later to wreak his revenge. The film's plot seems to have been inspired by the 1958 American horror classic The Thing That Couldn't Die, with a nod toward Black Sunday (1960) and Night of the Living Dead (1968). Julian Ruiz handled the special gore effects.

Naschy shot a major part of the film at his parents' palatial estate in the country which lent the film a bigger budget look (the house suffered some damage during the zombie attack but his parents were very understanding.) When the film premiered at the Sitges International Fantastic Film Festival in April 1973, Naschy's proud parents were sitting with him in the audience.

A 1982 sequel, Panic Beats, followed in which the Alaric de Marnac character returned to life again (played by Paul Naschy once more).

== Plot ==
The medieval warlock Alaric de Marnac (Paul Naschy) and his murderous witch companion Mabille de Lancre (Helga Line) are both convicted of Satanism and are executed by decapitation together in a field. But before they are killed, Alaric curses the descendants of the men who are putting him to death, threatening their progeny hundreds of years in the future. Centuries pass, and a group of young people travel to the area to search for the grave, and possible treasure, of Alaric and Mabille. The group is led by Hugo de Marnac (Paul Naschy), the modern day descendant of Alaric.

They discover a buried treasure chest on the grounds which they leave overnight in a garage until they can open it. The chest actually contains the severed (still living) head of Alaric, who hypnotizes several members of the group when they open it, and uses them to kill some of the others. Alaric forces his thralls to exhume his headless corpse and then has them reunite his head with his body, making him whole again.

Then he uses the blood from one of his female victims to reanimate the skeleton of Mabille in her tomb, bringing her back to life. At one point, a number of the dead victims return to life and lay siege to the house (a la George Romero's Night of the Living Dead). Most of the party is decimated by the time the last remaining member figures out a way to send Alaric and his mistress back to Hell by exposing the monsters to a sacred medallion.

== Cast ==
- Paul Naschy - in a triple role as Alaric de Marnac, Hugo de Marnac, and Armand de Marnac
- Emma Cohen as Elvira
- Victor Alcazar (credited as Vic Winner) - in a dual role as Maurice Roland and Andre Roland
- Helga Line as Mabille De Lancre
- Cristina Suriani as Paula
- Betsabe Ruiz as Sylvia
- Luis Ciges as Alain
- Julio Peña as Jean
- Maria Jose Cantudo as Chantal
- Francisco Llinas as Alain's partner
- Jose Marco as Reciter of Alaric's crimes at execution
- Juan Cazalilla as Gaston, Elvira's father
- Montserrat Julio as Odile
- Elsa Zabala as Madame Komarova
- Francisco Nieto as Hubard
- Jose Martinez Blanco as Narrador
- Pedro Bravo as Efebo
- Ramon Centenero as Govar

== Reception ==
Writing in The Zombie Movie Encyclopedia, academic Peter Dendle cites Night of the Living Dead as having inspired the depiction of a zombie siege in this film. Kurt Dahlke of DVD Talk wrote, "Clearly Horror Rises From The Tomb is over-the-top, and a shining example of sleazy Euro-trash cinema." In another review from DVD Talk, Stuart Galbraith rated it 2/5 stars and recommended it to horror fans "open-minded enough to forgive [Naschy's] films' frequent incoherence and low budgets".
