= El Retorno de Walpurgis =

Curse of the Devil
- Spanish film poster
- Directed by: Carlos Aured
- Written by: Paul Naschy (credited as Jacinto Molina)
- Produced by: Luis Mendez; Ramiro Meléndez
- Starring: Paul Naschy; Fabiola Falcón; Maritza Olivares
- Cinematography: Francisco Sánchez
- Edited by: Maruja Soriano
- Music by: Angel Arteaga
- Distributed by: Lotus Films; Prods. Escorpion; Izaro Films; Goldstone Film Enterprises
- Release dates: September 1973 (Spain); 1976 (U.S.)
- Running time: 84 minutes (USA, uncut)
- Countries: Spain; Mexico
- Language: Spanish

El Retorno de Walpurgis (The Return of Walpurgis, also known as Curse of the Devil) is a 1973 Mexican-Spanish co-production horror film that is the seventh in a twelve-film series about the werewolf Count Waldemar Daninsky, played by Paul Naschy. This film ignored the events in all of the earlier Wolf Man films and began an entirely new origin for el Hombre Lobo, which is strange because the film's Spanish title The Return of Walpurgis seems to tie it in with Naschy's earlier 1970 film Walpurgis Night. The Wolf Man makeup was done by Fernando Florido. The film was shot in June 1973, and by September, it was already in theaters in Spain, as El Retorno de Walpurgis. It wasn't released theatrically in the U.S. however until 1976, as Curse of the Devil.

It was shown in Germany originally on August 7, 1974, as Night of the Diabolical Orgy, then was re-released on October 7, 1974, as Die Todeskralle des Grausamen Wolfes / Death Claws of the Cruel Wolves. Mexico released it as Night of the Killer, France as L'Empreinte de Dracula / The Mark of Dracula, and Belgium as Return of the Loup Garous.

This was the last film that Naschy worked on with director Carlos Aured. As soon as the film was completed, Aured became very cold toward Naschy and never again asked him to work with him. Naschy said in his autobiography that he never understood why Aured acted that way toward him, but he surmised that perhaps Aured thought Naschy was becoming too controlling on their collaborations, since Naschy was not only starring in the films, he was also involved in writing and casting them. (They reconciled their differences in 2007, but by then Aured was just months away from dying.).

This film was followed by Naschy's eighth Hombre Lobo film La Maldicion de la Bestia (1975).

== Plot ==
In medieval times, the nobleman Irineus Daninsky engages in a duel to the death with the evil Barna Bathory, whose wife Elizabeth Bathory runs a cult of Satanic worshippers. Irineus beheads Barna, then has his army round up the Countess and all of her followers. He has them all put to death, but not before the Countess puts a curse on the Daninsky bloodline.

Hundreds of years later, the wealthy Count Waldemar Daninsky (a descendant of Irineus) kills a wolf on his grounds. The animal transforms back into a man upon death, and Waldemar finds himself cursed by a local witch who is angry that he killed one of her band. The witch summons Satan (a thin, uncredited actor in a head-to-toe black leotard) who participates in a nocturnal orgy with some of the group's young women in the woods. The witch then orders a beautiful young woman named Ilona to seduce Daninsky and then, while he is sleeping, to bite him with the skull of a werewolf which she smuggles into the Count's mansion.

When she presses the skull's fangs into his skin, Waldemar is doomed to become a werewolf himself on Walpurgis Night (April 30). Without a doubt, this is the most original of all of Waldemar's various "origins" in the series. The gypsy then flees from Waldemar's mansion into the woods, where strangely she is decapitated by an axe-wielding escapee from a mental hospital for which the local police have been searching.

Meanwhile, an aged surveyor Laszlo Wilowa rents a cabin on Waldemar's estate, and moves in with his blind wife and his two beautiful young daughters, Marie and Kinga. Waldemar falls in love with the chaste Kinga and they make love, but Waldemar also winds up in bed with her sister Marie who is a bit of a nymphomaniac. While they are making love, Waldemar transforms and tears Marie to shreds. He later returns to the cabin and violently kills both Laszlo and his blind wife, leaving Kinga an orphan. Later, as Waldemar tries to comfort Kinga, she informs him that she is pregnant with his baby.

Maritza tells Kinga that Waldemar is a monster, and that only she is pure enough to be able to release him from his curse by killing him. Even though Kinga knows now that Waldemar murdered her entire family, she still loves him because he is the father of her unborn child.

The townspeople learn that it is Waldemar who has been killing all the locals (they had thought that the escaped axe murderer was doing it), and to punish them for keeping Waldemar's secret, they kill both the butler and the nanny. Waldemar manages to murder the local police inspector before being stabbed to death by Kinga with a silver dagger plunged into his heart.

An epilogue shows an older Kinga visiting Waldemar's grave years later with their son accompanying her. As they leave the graveyard, the full moon illuminates them and the boy's hand is shown covered with hair.

== Cast ==
- Paul Naschy as Count Waldemar Daninsky/El Hombre Lobo/Irineus Daninsky
- Jorge Matamoros as Barna Bathory, Elizabeth's husband
- María Silva as Countess Elizabeth Bathory
- Ines Morales as Ilona the gypsy
- Elsa Zabala as the gypsy witch
- (uncredited) - as Satan ??
- Fabiola Falcón as Kinga Wilowa
- Maritza Olivares as Maria Wilowa
- Eduardo Calvo as Laszlo Wilowa
- Mariano Vidal Molina as Roulga, police inspector
- José Manuel Martín as Bela, a local townsman
- Fernando Sanchez Polack as Boris the butler
- Anna Farra as Militza, Waldemar's nanny
- Pilar Vela as Irina Wilowa, Lazlo's wife
- Sandalio Hernandez as the doctor
- Jose Yepes as gypsy in Waldemar's dream
- Felicidad Nieto as another gypsy in Waldemar's dream
- Ana Maria Rossie as woman killed by Daninsky
- Santiago Rivero as a comedian killed by Daninsky

== Release ==
The film was released theatrically in its native Spain as El Retorno de Walpurgis in September 1973, in Germany as Die Todeskralle des Grausamen Wolfes (The Death Claws of the Cruel Wolves) in July 1974, in the U.K. as Curse of the Devil in 1976 (on a double bill with Amando de Ossorio's Return of the Evil Dead), and in the United States as Curse of the Devil in 1976. (The American distributor "Goldstone Film Ent." tried to connect the film to The Exorcist in its ad campaign.) It was shown in France under the inexplicable title L'empreinte de Dracula (The Mark of Dracula). It was released in Mexico as Night of the Killer.

The film was later released on VHS as Curse of the Devil.

The film was released on DVD by Anchor Bay Entertainment in 2002 as Curse of the Devil. It was subsequently re-released in a special edition in 2008 by Deimos Entertainment, a subdivision of BCI Eclipse, under the same title. It was also released as a German language Blu-ray from Subkultur under the title Die Todeskralle des Grausamen Wolfes.

== See also ==
- Holiday horror
