= Antonio Pica =

Spanish actor (1933–2014)

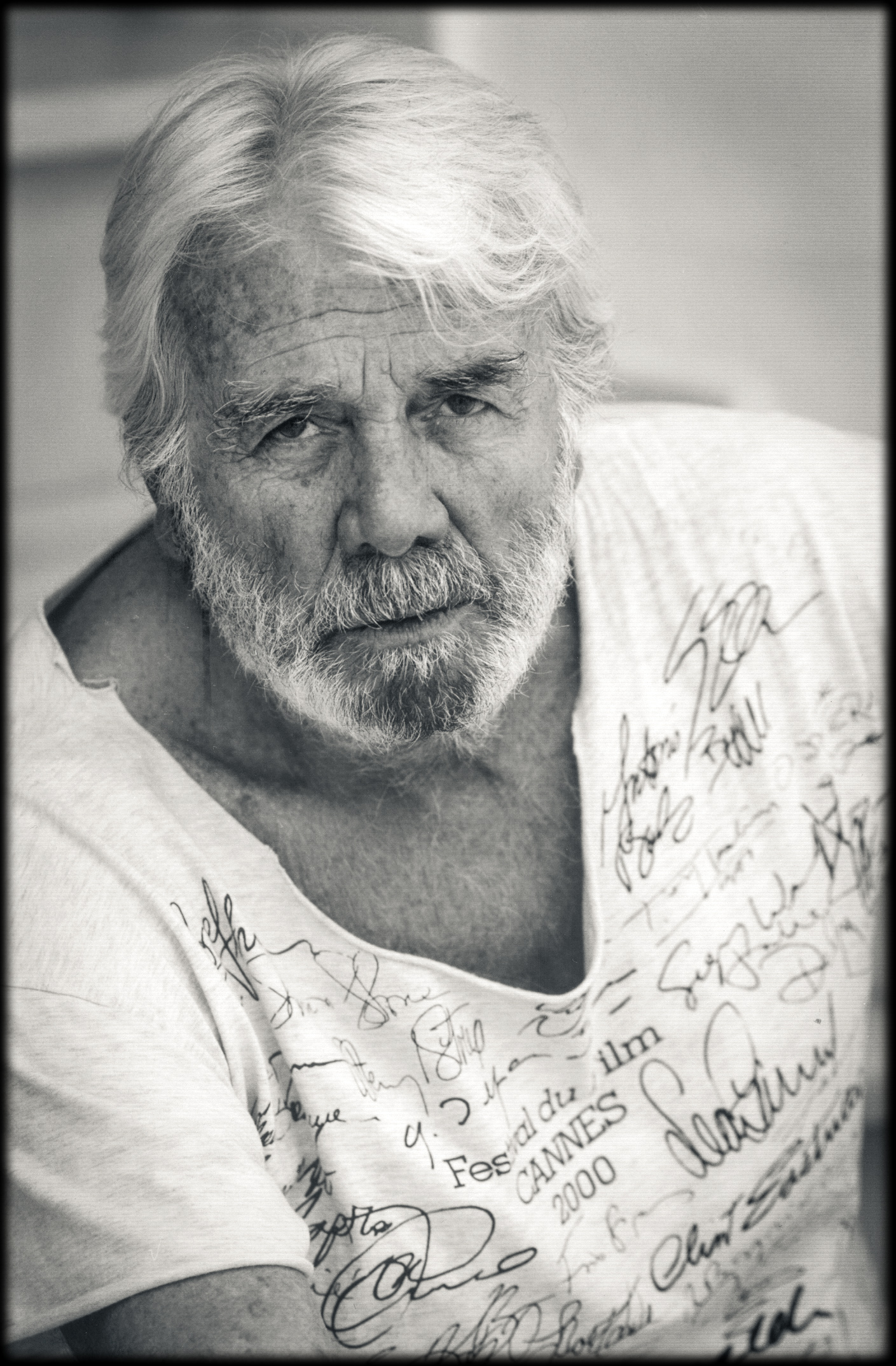
- Antonio Pica in 1999
- Born: Antonio de la Santísima Trinidad Pica Serrano; 21 March 1933; Jerez de la Frontera, Cádiz, Spain
- Died: 26 April 2014 (aged 81); El Puerto de Santa María, Spain
- Occupation: Actor
- Years active: 1961-2012

Antonio de la Santísima Trinidad Pica Serrano (21 March 1933 — 26 April 2014) was a Spanish actor.

Pica died on 26 April 2014 at a hospital in El Puerto de Santa María, Spain.

== Filmography ==
- A Fistful of Dollars (1964) - Rojo Gang Member (uncredited)
- Corrida pour un espion (1965) - (uncredited)
- Lola, espejo oscuro (1966)
- High Season for Spies (1966)
- Man on the Spying Trapeze (1966) - Stevens
- Comando de asesinos (1966)
- Target Goldseven (1966) - Alex, Erika's friend
- El hombre que mató a Billy el Niño (1967) - Mark Travis
- Due croci a Danger Pass (1967) - Sheriff Doug
- A Witch Without a Broom (1967)
- Django Kill (1967) - Templer Henchman (uncredited)
- Come rubare un quintale di diamanti in Russia (1967)
- Mister Dynamit - Morgen küßt euch der Tod (1967) - Flynn
- Bandidos (1967) - Train Porter
- Encrucijada para una monja (1967) - Officer
- Dos hombres van a morir (1968) - Sheriff
- Un diablo bajo la almohada (1968) - Mr. Anderson
- Satanik (1968) - Louis La Roche
- Cuidado con las señoras (1968) - Jorge Rivera
- Death on High Mountain (1969)
- Hombre en la trampa (1969)
- Objetivo: bi-ki-ni (1969) - Miguel
- Pagó cara su muerte (1969)
- Hora cero: Operación Rommel (1969) - Lt. Thomas Mulligan
- El taxi de los conflictos (1969) - Novio de la hermana de Catalina
- Cry Chicago (1969) - Agent Lason
- A Bullet for Sandoval (1969) - Sam Paul
- Santo frente a la muerte (1969) - Igor's henchman
- S.O.S. invasión (1969) - Tío de Susana
- Santo contra los asesinos de la mafia (1970)
- Manos torpes (1970) - Ted
- Sin un adiós (1970) - Daniel - mánager de Mario
- Una señora llamada Andrés (1970) - Hern Screicher
- The Underground (1970)
- La orilla (1971) - Capitán Losada
- Long Live Robin Hood (1971)
- Españolas en París (1971)
- Delusions of Grandeur (1971) - Grand d'Espagne
- The Rebellious Novice (1971)
- Travels with my Aunt (1972) - Elegant Man
- The Heroes (1973) - Dietrich
- Los mil ojos del asesino (1973)
- Los Ojos Azules de la Muneca Rota (1973) - Inspector Pierre
- Vengeance of the Zombies (1973) - Superintendent Hawkins
- Santo contra el doctor Muerte (1973) - Peter
- El último viaje (1974) - Colombo
- Una mujer prohibida (1974) - Maître
- Blue Eyes of the Broken Doll (1974) - Inspector Pierre
- Una abuelita de antes de la guerra (1975) - Antonio
- The Mark of Zorro (1975) - Major André de Colignac
- Cry, Onion! (1975) - Hal Foster (uncredited)
- Tres suecas para tres Rodríguez (1975)
- El misterio de la perla negra (1976) - Andres Cortes
- Licántropo (1997) - Comisario Lacombe
