= Perla Cristal =

Argentine actress and vedette and singer

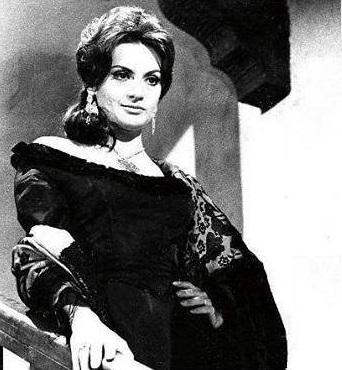
- Cristal in 1960
- Born: September 29, 1937 (age 88); Buenos Aires, Argentina
- Occupation: Actress
- Years active: 1965-1977

Perla Cristal (born September 29, 1937) is an Argentine actress and vedette and singer who began her career in her native country, with incursions into Hollywood and Spanish and Italian cinema. She settled in Spain in the early 1960s and continued her career in film.

Cristal's first starring role was in the 1950 film Arroz con leche under director Carlos Schlieper. Other notable films include The Black Tulip (1964), starring Alain Delon and Virna Lisi, and The Corruption of Chris Miller (1972), with Jean Seberg and Marisol. She also appeared in Jess Franco's The Awful Dr. Orloff (1962) and starred opposite Paul Naschy in The Fury of the Wolfman (1972).

== Filmography ==
- 1950: Rice and Milk
- 1954: La cueva de Ali-Babá
- 1962: The Awful Dr. Orloff
- 1962: I motorizzati (uncredited)
- 1963: Las enfermeras (TV Series)
- 1963: Escala en Hi-Fi
- 1963: Four Nights of the Full Moon
- 1964: Pão, Amor e... Totobola
- 1964: Primera fila (TV Series, 2 episodes)
- 1964: The Black Tulip
- 1964: The Avenger of Venice
- 1964: Death Whistles the Blues
- 1964: Historias de mi barrio (TV Series, 2 episodes)
- 1964: La cesta
- 1964: Búsqueme a esa chica
- 1964: Un tiro por la espalda
- 1965: Espionage in Tangier
- 1965: La vuelta
- 1965: Dr. Orloff's Monster as Rosa
- 1966: Seven Guns for the MacGregors
- 1966: Novela (TV Series, 1 episode)
- 1966: Culpable para un delito
- 1966: Hoy como ayer
- 1966: The Tall Women
- 1966: Two Thousand Dollars for Coyote
- 1967: A Witch Without a Broom
- 1967: La familia Colón (TV Series, 1 episode)
- 1967: The Christmas Kid
- 1967: Crónica de nueve meses
- 1967: El rostro del asesino
- 1967: Forty Degrees in the Shade
- 1967: Seven Vengeful Women
- 1968: Oscuros sueños de agosto
- 1968: White Comanche
- 1968: 1001 Nights
- 1969: De Picos Pardos a la ciudad
- 1969: Juicio de faldas
- 1969: Susana
- 1970: Versatile Lovers
- 1970: ¿Por qué pecamos a los cuarenta?
- 1970: Sin un adiós
- 1970: Reverend's Colt
- 1971: El Cristo del Océano
- 1971: Los jóvenes amantes
- 1972: The Fury of the Wolfman
- 1972: Dust in the Sun
- 1966-1973: Estudio 1 (TV Series, 5 episodes)
- 1973: Tarde para todos (TV Series, 1 episode)
- 1973: The Corruption of Chris Miller
- 1973: Counselor at Crime
- 1973: Celos, amor y Mercado Común
- 1974: Hay que matar a B.
- 1974: El chulo
- 1974: Emma, puertas oscuras
- 1974: Señora doctor
- 1974: Cinco almohadas para una noche
- 1974: Las correrías del Vizconde Arnau
- 1974: Los inmorales
- 1974: Aquí y ahora (TV Series, 1 episode)
- 1975: El comisario G. en el caso del cabaret
- 1976: Fox Hunt
- 1976: Daphnis and Chloe
- 1977: Las marginadas
- 1977: The Black Pearl
- 1980: Pato a la naranja (TV Series, 3 episodes)
- 1984: Condemned to Hell
- 1988: Jailbird Rock
- 1989: La blanca paloma
- 1996: La revista (TV Series, 1 episode)
- 1996-1997: Éste es mi barrio (TV Series, 2 episodes)
- 2001: La novia del príncipe (Video)
- 2005: Roast Rabbit, Peruvian Girl and Desolation (Short)
- 2005: Entre voces (Short)
- 2006-2007: Amar es para siempre (TV Series, 53 episodes)
- 2007: Hospital Central (TV Series, 1 episode)
- 2008: Guante blanco (TV Series, 1 episode)
- 2010: Armando (o la buena vecindad)
