= Las Noches del Hombre Lobo =

- Directed by: René Govar
- Written by: C. Bellard; René Govar; Jacinto Molina
- Starring: Paul Naschy; Peter Beaumont; Monique Brainville
- Countries: Spain; France
- Language: Spanish

Las Noches del Hombre Lobo (English: Nights of the Wolf Man) is a lost 1968 Spanish horror film that centers around the werewolf Count Waldemar Daninsky, played by Paul Naschy. It has been credited as the second part of Paul Naschy's 12 "Hombre Lobo" films. However, it has been disputed if the film was ever made or exists at all. No one, including Naschy himself, has ever viewed the film and it has never seen a theatrical or home media release.

Las Noches del Hombre Lobo was followed by the third film in the series in 1969, Los Monstruos del Terror (The Monsters of Terror).

== Authenticity ==
Naschy was the only person who ever insisted that Las Noches del Hombre Lobo was filmed. He claimed in interviews that the scenes were shot in Paris. Supposedly the director, a man named René Govar, was killed in a car accident in Paris the week after the film was sent off to the lab for processing, and that since no one ever paid the negative costs, the lab held onto the film for collateral and then later misplaced it or discarded it. Naschy attributed to this film Peter Beaumont and Monique Brainville as fellow lead actors, however there is no further information to prove Beaumont and Brainville existed. Naschy could not even recall the names of any other actors who starred in this film. There is also no record of a director named René Govar ever working in the French film industry. Most Naschy fans regard the film listing as either a hoax or an error, with some theorizing that Naschy may have fabricated the existence of this film to enrich his film résumé. Despite this, he has argued that the film exists and continued to do so until his death in 2009.

== Plot ==
Naschy detailed in an interview that the story deals with a professor who learns that a student of his suffers from lycanthropy, and under the guise of helping him, uses him as an instrument of revenge by controlling him by means of sound waves whenever he transforms. It is possible this film later became the 1970 La Furia del Hombre Lobo (The Fury of the Wolfman), as the plots of the two films are similar, and that would explain why Nights no longer exists. A user on a fan site claimed to have seen a still photo from this film, but it could have actually been a still from Fury of the Wolf Man with a variant title printed on it by the distributor, especially since Fury was only released to theaters five years after it was completed.

== Cast ==
- Paul Naschy as Waldemar Daninsky
- Peter Beaumont as The Mad Scientist, Dr. Wolfstein
- Monique Brainville
- Beba Novak
- Helene Vatelle
- Note - None of these actors have any other credits (with the exception of Naschy and Novak)
