= La Noche de Walpurgis =

- Theatrical release poster
- Directed by: León Klimovsky; Carlos Aured (asst. director)
- Written by: Paul Naschy (as Jacinto Molina)
- Produced by: Salvadore Romero; Alberto Platard
- Starring: Paul Naschy; Gaby Fuchs; Barbara Capell; Patty Shepard
- Cinematography: Leo Williams
- Edited by: Tony Grimm
- Music by: Antón García Abril
- Distributed by: Hispamex; Plata Films; Ellman Film Enterprises (US); Butchers Film Dist. (UK); HIFI Stereo 70
- Release dates: May 17, 1971 (Spain); 1972 (United States)
- Running time: 86 minutes
- Countries: Spain; West Germany
- Language: Spanish
- Budget: $120,000

La Noche de Walpurgis, also known as Walpurgis Night (released in the United States as The Werewolf vs. The Vampire Woman, in the UK as Shadow of the Werewolf, and in Canada as Werewolf Shadow), is a 1970 Spanish/German horror film starring Paul Naschy, the fifth in his series about the werewolf Waldemar Daninsky. This film was directed by León Klimovsky and written by Naschy, and is generally regarded to have kickstarted the Spanish horror film boom of the 1970s (as well as Naschy's career).

La Noche de Walpurgis was Naschy's all-time most financially successful film. It was also the first of 8 films that he would make with director Leon Klimovsky at the helm.

== Plot summary ==
Following the events in The Fury of the Wolf Man, the deceased lycanthrope Waldemar Daninsky is revived to life when two country doctors surgically remove two silver bullets from his heart while performing an autopsy on him. Waldemar transforms into a werewolf, kills the doctors and escapes from the morgue. Some time later, two students, Elvira (named after Naschy's real-life wife of 40 years) and her friend Genevieve go searching for the tomb of medieval murderer Countess Wandessa Darvula de Nadasdy. They find a possible gravesite in the vicinity of Waldemar Daninsky's castle, and the handsome count invites the girls to stay for a few days while they investigate the site.

When Waldemar helps them to uncover the grave of Countess Wandessa, Elvira accidentally revives the vampire by bleeding onto her corpse. The vampire woman turns several young women —including Genevieve— into creatures of the night like herself, and they roam the forest at night, killing people in eerie slow motion. Daninsky later turns into the Wolf Man, and he is forced to battle and destroy the vampire countess, after which he is killed by Elvira, a woman who loves him enough to end his torment; she plunges a silver cross into Waldemar's chest.

== Cast ==
- Paul Naschy as Waldemar Daninsky
- Gaby Fuchs as Elvira
- Patty Shepard as Countess Wandesa Dárvula de Nadasdy
- Barbara Capell as Genevieve Bennett
- Yelena Samarina as Elizabeth Daninsky
- Andrés Resino as Inspector Marcel
- José Marco as Pierre
- Betsabé Ruiz as Pierre's girlfriend
- Barta Barri as Muller
- Luis Gaspar as Distraught man
- Julio Peña as Dr. Hartwig
- Eduardo Chappa 2 roles as Tramp / Monster
- María Luisa Tovar as First Female Victim

== Production ==
La Noche de Walpurgis was the fifth entry in a series of films to feature the werewolf Waldemar Daninsky. Daninsky's lycanthropy is not given a specific origin in this film; the events of the film are assumed to have followed from the ending of Fury of the Wolf Man (1970), which involved a Yeti's bite as the cause of Daninsky's curse. How Daninsky went from being a college professor in Fury to being a castle-owning count in Walpurgis is never addressed. Some critics feel the film works better if one assumes it to be a direct sequel to Naschy's first werewolf film, La Marca del Hombre Lobo (1968).

== Release ==
The film was released theatrically in its native Spain as La Noche de Walpurgis in May 1971, and was released theatrically in the United States as The Werewolf vs the Vampire Woman by Ellman Film Enterprises in 1972, accompanied by a paperback novelization tie-in (which didn't really follow the plot of the film too closely). It was released in Belgium as Night of the Loup Garous, in Germany in October 1971 as Die Nacht der Vampire/ Night of the Vampire, and in the UK as Shadow of the Werewolf in 1973 (on a double bill with Amando de Ossorio's Tombs of the Blind Dead). It was re-released theatrically years later in Germany as Nacht der Blutigen Hexen/ Night of the Bloody Witches. It was shown in Italy as La Messe Nere della Contessa Dracula/ The Black Mass of Countess Dracula, and in France as La Furie des Vampires.

=== Home media ===
The film was released on VHS in the 1980s as both Blood Moon and as The Werewolf vs the Vampire Woman, and was later released on a special edition DVD in 2007 by Deimos Entertainment, a subdivision of BCI Eclipse, as Werewolf Shadow (sic) with extras. It has also been released as a German Blu-Ray from Subkultur under the title Die Nacht der Vampire.

== Alternate Release Titles ==
- La Noche de Walpurgis (Spain/ Mexico)
- Die Nacht der Vampire (Germany)
- The Werewolf vs the Vampire Woman (U.S.)
- Shadow of the Werewolf (U.K.)
- Werewolf's Shadow (Canada)
- Le messe nere della contessa Dracula (Italy)
- La Furie des Vampires (France)
- Vámpírok éjjele (Hungary)
- Le Nuit des Loup Garous (Belgium)

== See also ==
- Holiday horror
