= Assignment: Terror =

- Spanish theatrical release poster
- Directed by: Hugo Fregonese; Tulio Demicheli
- Written by: Jacinto Molina
- Produced by: Jaime Prades
- Starring: Paul Naschy; Michael Rennie; Karin Dor; Craig Hill; Patty Shepard; Angel del Pozo; Manuel de Blas
- Cinematography: Godofredo Pacheco
- Edited by: Emilio Rodríguez
- Music by: Rafael Fitó; Franco Salina
- Production companies: Eichberg-Film; International Jaguar Cinematografica; Producciones Jaime Prades
- Distributed by: Castilla Films
- Release date: 24 February 1970 (West Germany)
- Running time: 85 minutes (Spain)
- Countries: Spain; West Germany; Italy
- Language: Spanish
- Budget: $1 million

Los Monstruos del Terror (translation: The Monsters of Terror), also known as Dracula vs. Frankenstein and Assignment: Terror, is a 1970 Spanish-West German-Italian horror and Sci-Fi film co-directed by Tulio Demicheli and Hugo Fregonese. (Fregonese quit midway through the production so the film was completed by Demicheli). Eberhard Meichsner was also credited as a director only in the British promotional material, but by all accounts he was not actually involved.

The film tells of aliens who revive Frankenstein's Monster and Count Dracula, among other archetypal monsters. It is the third in a series of 12 films that Paul Naschy wrote and starred in featuring the werewolf Waldemar Daninsky, a role that was always played by Naschy. It stars Paul Naschy, Michael Rennie (his last film), Craig Hill and Karin Dor. Maria Perschy was supposed to play Maleva Kerstein, but Karin Dor wound up getting the part.

It was filmed in early Spring, 1969. The film was first released theatrically in Germany (as Dracula jagt [hunts] Frankenstein) on February 24, 1970, and in Spain (as The Monsters of Terror) on August 28, 1971. The film was also shown in France and in the U.K. as Dracula vs Frankenstein. In Belgium, it was shown as Dracula and the Wolf Man vs Frankenstein. In Mexico, it was released as Operation Terror, and in Denmark it was known as Frankenstein Og Blodsugerne/ Frankenstein vs The Bloodsucker. In the 1980s, the film was released on home video in France as Reincarnator. (Most of the film's variant titles did not even mention Naschy's Wolfman character.).

The film sold directly to late-night television in the U.S. in 1973, retitled Assignment Terror (since the title Dracula vs Frankenstein had already been used for the 1971 Al Adamson American film). In the U.K., the film played on a double bill with Peter Walker's 1970 horror film Die Screaming Marianne. Coincidentally, another Spanish film, released in 1972, also used the title Dracula vs Frankenstein.

Los Monstruos del Terror was originally going to be called El Hombre que Vino de Ummo (translation: The Man Who Came from Ummo), referring to Michael Rennie's space-man character, but the title was changed to The Monsters of Terror.

It was followed in the series by the 1970 film The Fury of the Wolfman.

== Plot ==
Aliens, occupying the bodies of deceased Earth scientists, revive a vampire, a werewolf, a female mummy, and Frankenstein's monster with a plan to use them to take over the human race by using their own primitive superstitions against them. (A Golem was supposed to be one of the monsters in this film, but unfortunately the budgetary problems the filmmakers encountered wouldn't permit it.) The aliens want to discover why these monsters are so frightening to Earthlings. For reference, the aliens use a book entitled The Anthology of the Monsters by a Professor Ulrich von Farancksalan, who was also the creator of the Frankenstein monster in this film.

The werewolf Waldemar Daninsky saves the world by destroying the other three monsters in hand-to-hand combat and ultimately blowing up the aliens' underground base; however, he is shot to death in the film's finale by a woman who loves him enough to end his torment.

== Cast ==
- Michael Rennie as Dr. Odo Warnoff, the leader of the aliens
- Karin Dor as Maleva Kerstein
- Craig Hill as Inspector Tobermann
- Patty Shepard as Ilsa Sternberg (as Patty Sheppard)
- Gela Geisler as Ilona (as Ella Gessler)
- Ángel del Pozo as Dr. Kerian Werner
- Paul Naschy as Count Waldemar Daninsky (as Paul Naschi)
- Manuel de Blas as Count Janos of Mialhoff (based on Count Dracula)
- Ferdinando Murolo as The Monster of Farancksalan (based on Frankenstein's monster)
- Gene Reyes as Tao-Tet (The Mummy)
- Peter Damon as Judge Sternberg
- Robert Hall as Commissioner Gluck
- Diana Sorel as Librarian
- Luciano Tacconi as the carnival exhibit owner
- Paul Cross as Dr. Don Uno, the morgue attendant

== Production ==
Lead actor Paul Naschy also wrote the screenplay at the request of producer Prades, who was impressed by the box office success of Naschy's La Marca del Hombre Lobo that year and wanted to film a sequel. The original shooting title was The Man Who Came from Ummo, but the producer changed it to The Monsters of Terror. Direction was split between two Argentine-born filmmakers, Hugo Fregonese and Tulio Demicheli. Naschy said Fregonese quit the project two-thirds of the way through, and Demichelli stepped in to finish the film. Only Demichelli was actually credited on the prints. Naschy claimed that Hollywood actor Robert Taylor volunteered to play the lead alien in the film, but the producer hired Michael Rennie instead.

Naschy also said the makeup man on the film, Rafael Ferrer, was the most incompetent man he ever worked with. (The makeup on Frankenstein in this film was so similar to the 1930s Universal make-up that it could easily have caused a lawsuit. Hence Naschy changed the name of the Monster in this film to "Farancksalan", but it fooled very few people.)

Naschy was told the film would have a lavish budget, which inspired him to let his imagination run wild while writing the screenplay. The film was shot in Egypt, Germany, Italy and Spain. Filming was interrupted several times because of Prades' financial difficulties, and thus the script was not filmed as it was written. Whole segments of the script involving flying saucers and the Golem were never carried out as the result of sorely lacking funds.

== Release and attempts at restoration ==
An English language one-sheet poster exists for this film bearing the title Assignment Terror, but it is unknown why they created it because AIP only distributed the film direct to television in the U.S. in 1973. It was later released on VHS as Dracula vs. Frankenstein in a splicy, full screen panned-and-scanned print.

The film is available today on a DVD from Reel Vault under the title Assignment Terror, as well as on a German Blu-Ray under the title Assignment Terror (Dracula Jagt Frankenstein)

== Trivia ==
The film was broadcast on Tele 5 as part of the programme format SchleFaZ in season 2.
