= Maritza Olivares =

Mexican actress

- Born: 1956 (age 69–70); Tamaulipas
- Other name: Maritsa Olivares
- Children: Valentina Sumavsky

Maritza Olivares is a Mexican actress. She appeared in telenovelas and movies, for example in horror El Retorno de Walpurgis. Olivares’ best known role is the role of Cayetana in Entre el amor y el odio.

Olivares studied in London and has worked in Mexico, United States and France.

Olivares was nominated for an Ariel Award for Best Actress for her work in her first movie Los Meses y los Días, for which she also won the Heraldo Award. Olivares lost the Ariel to Lucha Villa, her co-star in the film National Mechanics.

Olivares has a daughter Valentina Sumavsky, also an actress.

== Filmography ==
Year	Title	Role	Notes
1972	Los Perturbados		Film
1972	National Mechanics		Film
1973	El Retorno de Walpurgis	Maria Wilowa	Film
1973	Los meses y los días	Cecilia	Film
1973	El espectro del terror		Film
1973	Adios, amor...		Film
1974	Adorables mujercitas		Film
1975	El caballo del diablo	Lupita	Film
1975	La venida del rey Olmos	Martina	Film
1976	La vida cambia		Film
1978	Mil millas al sur	Nancy	Film
1978	Carroña		Film
1979	Lágrimas negras		Telenovela, supporting role
1979	Border Cop	Prostitute	Film
1979	Discoteca es amor	Chata	Film
1979	Tres Mujeres en la Hoguera	Susi	Film
1979	Discotec fin de semana	Chata	Film
1980	Perro callejero		Film
1981	El hogar que yo robé	Florita	Telenovela, supporting role
1981	Las braceras	Rosario	Film
1981	La Chèvre	La prostituée	Film
1984	Braceras y mojados		Film
1985	El ángel caído	Remedios Nava	Telenovela, supporting role
1986	Pobre juventud	Lupita	Telenovela, supporting role
1987	Pobre señorita Limantour		Telenovela, supporting role
1990	Cartel de la droga		Film
1991	Mente criminal		Film
1992	De frente al sol	Elena	Telenovela, supporting role
1994	Máxima violencia		Film
1999	Alma Rebelde	Almudena's mother	Telenovela, special appearance
2002	Entre el amor y el odio	Cayetana	Telenovela, antagonist
2004	Corazones al límite	Amalia Vallardes	Telenovela, antagonist
2014	La Malquerida	Olga	Telenovela, special appearance
2015	Como dice el dicho	Nuria	Episode:"De todos huí menos de mí..."
