= Ángel Arteaga =

Spanish musician and composer

- Born: Ángel Arteaga de la Guía; 28 January 1928; Campo de Criptana, Castilla-La Mancha, Spain
- Died: 17 January 1984 (aged 55); Madrid, Spain

Ángel Arteaga de la Guía (Campo de Criptana, Ciudad Real, Castilla-La Mancha, 28 January 1928 – Madrid, 17 January 1984) was a Spanish musician and composer.

== Biography ==
Arteaga was born in Campo de Criptana, (Ciudad Real), and his musical initiation took place in the Beethoven Philharmonic Band in his hometown.

In 1950, he entered the Madrid Royal Conservatory where he studied harmony, fugue, and composition with the professors Vitorino Echevarría, Francisco Calés Pina, and Julio Gómez García. Between 1957 and 1963 he studied at the Staatliche Hoschshule für Musik in Munich with Carl Orff and Harald Genzmer, a disciple of Hindemith. At the same time, he completed three summer courses at the Accademia Musicale Chigiana in Siena (Italy) in composition and film music. In Germany he married Waltraud Pizenbauer.

During these years he was awarded the following:

- First prize in the International Bregenz Contest (Austria) for his orchestral work "Clavileño" (1960), among more than 130 composers from across the world.
- "Hugo Von Monfort" prize in Bregenz (Austria) for his work "Prólogo para Orquesta" (1961)
- "Ferdinando Ballo Napolitano" prize in the International Contest celebrated in Siena, (Italy) for the work "Trio para órgano" (1962).

Upon returning to Spain, he received an award from the Information Ministry with his tone poem "Cuevas de Nerja" (1963); and the composition prize from the Fine Arts Circle of Madrid for "Cantata Elogios" (1972–73).

Between 1964 and 1984 he composed music for over 90 films. These included the crime film The Crimes of Petiot (1973), the Doug McClure comedy What Changed Charley Farthing? (1974), and several thrillers and horror movies, such as The Mark of the Wolfman (1968), El vampiro de la autopista (The Horrible Sexy Vampire) (1970), The Glass Ceiling (1971), The Fury of the Wolfman (1972), and La cruz del diablo (1975).

In 1997 he was posthumously awarded the title "Favorite Son of Campo de Criptana," together with fellow musician and composer Manuel Angulo Sepúlveda. In January 2006, a selection of his most representative works were published on CD, partially performed by the City Orchestra of Granada under the direction of José Luis Temes.

== His personality, technique, and style ==
A musician by instinct, that is, by ideas, his thoughts were charged with irony, clearly perceptible in works such as those based on Ramón Gómez de la Serna. He turned away from pigeonholing himself in favor of his own very personal work. Because of this, he was a demanding self-critic and analytical thinker. He analyzed in music what he absorbed in his artistic gaze or poetic lyricism. In his technique, he strove for high quality and greatly crafted beauty.

Arteaga premiered the opera La mona de imitación in the Teatro de la Zarzuela (May 1973), by Ester Casas, Pedro Farrés, and María Vagón, with stage direction by Pérez Sierra and musical direction by Odón Alonso. Without a doubt, this was a true success, thanks to the intelligent treatment of Ramón's prose and to the insertion of pentagrams in the ideological literature curve in order to further bring the ideas and solutions of a transcendental mood.

Composing music for numerous films and documentaries prevented Arteaga from leaving a more extensive body of works for posterity. However, he has left us enough to justifiably situate his figure with the most outstanding of the 1951 generation.

== Principal compositions ==
Together with his teaching as a harmony professor at the Royal Conservatory of Music in Madrid, Ángel Arteaga was an outstanding composer. Therefore, it is possible to highlight his principal works:

- Chamber works: “Improvisación y Canon”, “Cuatro improvisaciones” (for viola and piano, 1960), “Cuatro Piezas”, “Músicas de Don Quijote”, “Música para un festival cervantino”, and “Divertimento”.
- Choral works: “Eloges” (about Saint John Perse, 1963, for which he received honorable mention in the Symphonic Choral Contest of Guipúzcoa in 1967), "Kontakion" (based on Byzantine liturgy, 1962), "Himnos Medievales", and "Kinderlied".
- Vocal works: “Santo de Palo” (about Pedro Salinas, 1972).
- Works for solo instruments: “Sonatina estilo clásico”, “Segunda palabra” (which glosses a text by Gerardo Diego, 1971), "Abisiphon", and "Trio para órgano".
- Works for various instruments: “Octetos”, “Irradiaciones”, “Contextura”, “Contexto II”, “Simplicisimus”, “Sonata a tres”, “Concertante”, and “Fin de Curso”.
- Works for film and television: “El Museo del Prado”, “Santa Teresa de Ávila”, “Antonio Gaudí”, and “La Alhambra de Granada”.
- Works for theatre: “La mona de imitación” (chamber opera, premiered in May 1973 in the Teatro de la Zarzuela in Madrid), "El bosque de Sama" (children's opera), and "Tres rosas de Aranjuez" (ballet in collaboration with Manuel Angulo).
