= The Mark of the Wolfman =

- Spanish theatrical release poster
- Spanish: La Marca del Hombre Lobo
- Directed by: Enrique López Eguiluz
- Written by: Paul Naschy (as Jacinto Molina)
- Produced by: Maximiliano Pérez-Flores
- Starring: Paul Naschy; Manuel Manzaneque; Dyanik Zurakowska; Julian Ugarte; Rosanna Yanni; Aurora De Alba
- Cinematography: Emilio Foriscot
- Edited by: Francisco Jaumandreu
- Music by: Ángel Arteaga
- Production company: Maxper
- Distributed by: D.C. Films (Spain), Independent-International Pictures (U.S.)
- Release date: 29 July 1968; (Spain)
- Running time: 88 min
- Country: Spain
- Language: Spanish
- Budget: $300,000
- Box office: $1 million

The Mark of the Wolfman (Spanish: La Marca del Hombre Lobo), is a 1968 Spanish horror film, the first in a long series of films about the werewolf Count Waldemar Daninsky, played by Paul Naschy. The film was also known as Hell's Creatures, The Nights of Satan, The Vampires of Dr. Dracula and Frankenstein's Bloody Terror (the latter despite the fact that the film has nothing to do with either Frankenstein or his "bloody terror"). Naschy originally suggested actress Barbara Steele for the part of the vampire countess Wandesa, but Aurora De Alba wound up getting the part.

The film was in production from February to March 1968. It was first released theatrically in Spain (on July 29, 1968), in West Germany (on February 7, 1969), in the U.K. in February 1970 (on a double bill with The Night God Screamed (1970)), and finally in the U.S. in a slightly shortened version as Frankenstein's Bloody Terror in 1971. It was released to late-night television (edited) in the U.S. in 1974. The film was shot in Hi-Fi 70mm 3-D, but was only shown that way at a brief engagement in Munich, Germany, and in several select theaters in Hollywood (reviews mentioned the 3D effects looked somewhat shoddy).

The film is available on DVD from Shriek Show as Frankenstein's Bloody Terror, as well as on a German Blu-Ray (Region 2) under the title Die Vampire des Dr. Dracula.

Naschy claimed he followed up this film with a 1968 film Las Noches del Hombre Lobo (which is today a lost film, if indeed it was ever completed at all, since no one has ever seen it) and his 1969 film Los Monstruos del Terror.

== Plot ==
A drunken Gypsy couple spending the night in the abandoned Castle Wolfstein accidentally resurrect the werewolf Imre Wolfstein when they remove the silver cross from his corpse. Once alive, he not only kills the Gypsy couple, but also wreaks havoc on a nearby village. The villagers attribute the attack to ordinary wolves, and in response, form a hunting party to kill off the animals. While on the hunt, Count Waldemar Daninsky is attacked by Imre Wolfstein and is afflicted with lycanthropy. After killing innocent victims in the midst of his transformation, he seeks help from specialists, Dr. Janos de Mikhelov and his wife, who turn out to be two vampires, who then prey on both Janice and Rudolph, Waldemar's friends. The vampires revive the first werewolf, Imre, from the dead, and force the two werewolves to battle each other. Waldemar kills Imre Wolfstein with his fangs and then destroys the two vampires, only to be killed in turn by bullets fired by Janice, the woman who loved him most.

== Cast ==
- Paul Naschy as Count Waldemar Daninsky
- Manuel Manzaneque as Rudolph Weissmann
- Dyanik Zurakowska as Countess Janice Von Aarenberg
- Julian Ugarte as Dr. Janos Mikhelov
- Aurora de Alba as Wandesa
- Rosanna Yanni as Nascha
- Gualberto Gualban as Gyogyo
- Jose Nieto as Count Sigmund Von Aarenberg
- Carlos Casaravilla as Judge Weissmann
- Antonio Orengo as the butler
- Angel Menendez as Otto The Forest Keeper
- Milagros Ceballos as Magda
- Beatriz Savon as Frau Hildegard
- Victoriano Lopez
- Maria Teresa Torralba
- Angela Rhu
- Pilar Vela
- Juan Medina
- Antonio Jimenez Escribano

== Production ==
Paul Naschy was the stage name of the late Spanish screenwriter and actor Jacinto Molina. The film's German distributors felt that Molina needed a more Teutonic-sounding pseudonym. “Paul” was an homage to the Pope at the time, Paul VI, and “Naschy” was inspired by a well-known Hungarian Olympic athlete, Imre Nagy. La Marca del Hombre Lobo was the first in a long line of werewolf films that would make Paul Naschy world famous.

Naschy wrote an autobiography, which included his first encounter with the werewolf mythology in a movie theater as a young child in 1945. He described the first time he saw the Lon Chaney Jr. classic, Frankenstein Meets the Wolf Man:

The lights went out and the music began. After the film had finished, I went out to the street in a trance. That very night I sat down to draw the two terrifying characters locked in their brutal combat. From that day on, Larry Talbot [the Cheney character] was my hero. I even recall that, on one occasion when my mother asked me what I wanted to be when I grew up, I replied, "A werewolf!"

Naschy got the idea to make the first Spanish werewolf film while he was working on Agonizing in Crime in 1967. He broached the idea to the director of that film, Enrique Eguiluz, who initially tried to dissuade him from doing it. Naschy tried to interest Spanish director Amando de Ossorio in the project, who also tried to dissuade him. Finally, Eguiluz reconsidered and helped Naschy to find an interested Spanish film producer.

The film was supposed to be released in Germany as Der Wolfsmensch, but they decided to release it instead as Die Vampire des Dr. Dracula (The Vampires of Dr. Dracula). Later on, the film was re-released in Germany retitled Hexen des Grauens (The Witches of Terror). The film was re-released in Spain in 1976, again with the same title La Marca del Hombre Lobo.In some theaters in the U.S., the film played on a double bill with the Italian horror film The Embalmer.

In the United States, the film was titled Frankenstein's Bloody Terror, solely to satisfy the American distributor's need for a second "Frankenstein film" to pad out a planned double feature release. To justify this odd choice of title, an animated opening sequence especially created for the film explained that a branch of the Frankenstein family became cursed with lycanthropy and took the name Wolfstein. American producer Sam Sherman needed to fill 400 play dates for his film Dracula vs. Frankenstein which, at that time, was entangled in a legal stand-off with an unscrupulous film lab contracted to produce the release prints. The 400 theaters in question had been promised a Frankenstein double feature and Sherman was determined to give them one. Both films thus ran together in 1971 and after only in American theaters.

La Marca del Hombre Lobo was filmed in Jan Jacobsen’s Hi-Fi Stereo 70 3-D format. When Sherman learned this, he was persuaded by other investors to hire optical effects maestro Linwood Dunn to create single-strip, over-and-under 35mm prints for American release. The final results were reportedly beautiful to look at when projected through high-quality 3-D lenses (such as those created by Robert V. Bernier for Space-Vision), but a celebrity-studded Hollywood premiere was completely undone when Sherman’s fellow investors provided shoddy acrylic lenses for the projectors; hence from then on, it was only shown in Germany in 70mm 3-D.

A home 3-D release was held up for many years due to the rightsholders preventing the original 70mm negatives from leaving Spain; however, on September 15, 2024, it was announced that a complete 35mm over-and-under print had been discovered and was being scanned in 4K for a Blu-ray release in early 2025. The Frankenstein's Bloody Terror cut is coming soon (2025) from Kino Lorber in 3D.

== Reception ==
The film grossed enough to cover its $300,000 cost in Spain and earned $700,000 overseas.

== Alternate Titles ==
- La Marca del Hombre Lobo (Spain/Mexico)
- Die Vampire des Dr. Dracula (Germany)
- Hexen des Grauens (German re-release title)
- Hell's Creatures (U.K./ Australia)
- Frankenstein's Bloody Terror (U.S.)
- Le Notti di Satana (Italy)
- Les Fantomes de Dracula en de Weerwolf (Belgium)
- Hell Creature (Pakistan)
