= The Fury of the Wolfman =

- Spanish: La Furia del Hombre Lobo
- Directed by: José María Zabalza
- Written by: Jacinto Molina
- Produced by: Maxper Producciones Cinematograficas
- Starring: Paul Naschy; Perla Cristal; Verónica Luján; José Marco; Mark Stevens
- Cinematography: Leopoldo Villaseñor
- Edited by: Luis Álvarez; Sebastián Herranz
- Music by: Ángel Arteaga; Ana Satrova
- Distributed by: AVCO Embassy Pictures (U.S.)
- Release dates: 1974 (U.S. TV release); 1975 (Spanish theatrical release)
- Running time: 85 minutes
- Country: Spain
- Language: Spanish

The Fury of the Wolfman (Spanish: La Furia del Hombre Lobo), aka Wolfman Never Sleeps, is a 1970 Spanish horror film that is the fourth in a long series about the werewolf Count Waldemar Daninsky, played by Paul Naschy. Naschy wrote the screenplay as well. The film was shot in early 1970. It was not theatrically released in Spain until 1975 due to problems involved in finding a distributor, although it was distributed in edited form on U.S. TV in 1974.

A Swedish edit called Wolfman Never Sleeps has a longer running time and contains several extra nude sex scenes that were edited out of the regular version. Romana Gonzalez handled the werewolf makeup effects. Naschy had a very hard time working with the director Jose Maria Zabalza, who he said was usually drunk on the set and tampered enormously with Naschy's screenplay. There are claims that Zabalza even had his 14-year-old son help him to direct the film. When the film wound up being too short, Zabalza filmed a few additional werewolf sequences with another (uncredited) actor in the Wolfman costume to pad out the running time, and even spliced in footage from Naschy's 1968 La Marca del Hombre Lobo.

This was the first film to involve a Yeti as the means of transforming Waldemar into a werewolf (a similar "Yeti origin" appearing again years later in La Maldicion de la Bestia in 1975). Naschy's original werewolf film had him being transformed into a lycanthrope via the bite of another werewolf (Imre Wolfstein).

Naschy followed this film up with his 1970 landmark cult classic La Noche de Walpurgis, which many film historians consider the film that started the Spanish horror boom of the seventies.

== Plot ==
College professor Waldemar Daninsky travels to Tibet on an expedition and is bitten by a yeti, which causes him to become a werewolf. Upon his arrival home, he discovers his wife has taken a lover in his absence. After transforming into a werewolf, he murders the two of them, but he is accidentally electrocuted while trying to escape the murder scene. He is later revived to life by a female scientist, Dr. Ilona Ellmann, who uses her mind control experiments to control him. Daninsky later discovers her underground asylum populated by the bizarre subjects of her failed experiments.

The crazed lady scientist chains Waldemar to a wall in her lab and beats him mercilessly with a whip. Then she revives Waldemar's murdered ex-wife, who also becomes a werewolf (because she was fatally bitten by Daninsky), and forces the two werewolves to fight. Waldemar kills his wife for the second time, then kills Dr. Ellman throwing from a staircase, but is in her deaththoe shot to death by the doctor, a woman who loves him enough to end his torment.

== Cast ==
- Paul Naschy as Waldemar Daninsky/Wolfman
- Perla Cristal as Dr. Ilona Ellman/Eva Wolfstein
- Verónica Luján as Karin, Ilona's assistant
- Pilar Zorrilla as Erika Daninsky, Waldemar's former wife
- Miguel de la Riva as Deputy Wilhelm Kaufmann
- José Marco as Merrill
- Mark Stevens as Bill Williams, a reporter
- Alfredo Santacruz as Rector, Erika's boyfriend
- Francisco Amorós as Helmut Wolfstein, Ilona's husband
- Javier de Rivera as Detective
- Ramón Lillo as Frederick
- Fabián Conde as Ilona's henchman
- Victoria Hernandez as Dr. Ellman's assistant

== Production ==
The plot of this film differed from the earlier entries in the Hombre Lobo series in that 1) Daninsky is a college professor in this film, 2) his lycanthropy is caused by a Yeti's bite, and 3) Daninsky is married in this film. Naschy's friend Enrique Lopez Eguiluz started out to direct this film, but only managed to film Naschy's nightmare dream sequence at the beginning of the film. He left the project early and was replaced by Jose Maria Zabalza, whom Naschy said was an alcoholic and a very uncouth person. Due to the laziness of director Zabalza, this film wound up including a lot of stock footage from La Marca del Hombre Lobo (1968) to pad out its running time and a few carelessly mismatched werewolf scenes played by an anonoymous stunt double he hired without informing Naschy.

== Release ==
Although the film was made in 1970, it was only released theatrically (edited) in Spain and Argentina in 1975; it was sold directly to TV in the U.S. in 1974 (in somewhat edited form).

The film is today readily available on DVD. Most versions of the film are censored. The only unedited version of the film is the one titled Wolfman Never Sleeps (which was the Swedish print).

== Reception ==
One review states, "Add to the total fiasco of the script & the additionial [sic] confusion caused by bad translation, worse dub, and a multitude of edits of two versions (one version having a lot of nudity), and it's surprising that any sense can be made of it at all."
