= Tres mujeres en la hoguera =

- Directed by: Abel Salazar
- Written by: Luis Alcoriza; Carlos Valdemar
- Starring: Maricruz Olivier; Pilar Pellicer; Maritza Olivares; Rogelio Guerra
- Distributed by: Conacite Uno
- Release date: 1976
- Running time: 108 minutes
- Country: Mexico
- Language: Spanish language

Tres mujeres en la hoguera (English: Three women in a bonfire) is a 1976 Mexican thriller film.

== Synopsis ==
Rich Alex and his wife Mané invite a couple (Gloria and her lover Susy) to their house on the Pacific coast of Mexico (Puerto Vallarta) to spend a spring break there.

== Cast ==
- Maricruz Olivier — Gloria
- Pilar Pellicer — Mané
- Maritza Olivares — Susy
- Rogelio Guerra — Alex
- Enrique Muñoz
- Carlos Bravo y Fernández
- Daniela Romo — Peggy
