= Vengeance of the Zombies =

- Directed by: León Klimovsky
- Written by: Paul Naschy
- Produced by: Jose Antonio Perez Giner; Ricardo Munoz Suay
- Starring: Paul Naschy; Mirta Miller; Maria Kosti; Vic Winner; Luis Ciges; Aurora de Alba
- Cinematography: Francisco Sánchez Munoz
- Edited by: Antonio Ramírez de Loaysa
- Music by: Juan Carlos Calderón
- Production companies: Profilmes; Promofilms
- Distributed by: Profilmes; CFC-Contact- Film
- Release dates: June 1973 (Spain); December 1973 (U.S.)
- Running time: 90 minutes
- Country: Spain
- Language: Spanish

Vengeance of the Zombies (Spanish: La rebelión de las muertas/ Rebellion of the Dead Women) is a 1972 Spanish horror film directed by León Klimovsky and starring Paul Naschy, Mirta Miller, Vic Winner and Aurora de Alba. The film was shot in July 1972, but was only theatrically released in Spain (as La rebelión de las muertas) in June 1973. It was shown in Italy as La Vendetta dei Morti Viventi. The film was shown in Germany over the years under three different titles....Rebellion of the Living Dead (Feb. 1974 German release title), Invocation of the Devil (April 1974 German re-release title to compete with The Exorcist) and Blood Lust of the Zombies (1980 German re-release title to compete with Dawn of the Dead).

It was released in the U.S. as Vengeance of the Zombies in December 1973, on a double bill with another Klimovsky film The Dracula Saga. It was famously re-released in the U.S. later in 1980 under the title Walk of the Dead, with distributor Independent Artists adding a "Shock Notice" gimmick to the prints wherein inserted red warning flashes preceded each gory murder. It was reviewed as a "Dog of the Week" by Roger Ebert on Sneak Previews under that latter release version in the fall of 1980.

It is today available on DVD in its original uncut version as Vengeance of the Zombies.

== Plot ==
In this zombie horror film, a mysterious masked man rampages throughout England killing unsuspecting women. Each time a victim is murdered, they are brought back to life by an East Indian mystic named Kantanka (Paul Naschy) to join his army of female zombies. Paul Naschy plays the evil Katanka, as well as his own twin brother, a benevolent mystic named Krisna. Naschy plays a third role too, Satan (no relation to the twin brothers), in a brief dream sequence.

== Cast ==
- Paul Naschy - in a triple role as Krisna, Kantanka, and Satán
- Romy (aka Rommy) as Elvire Irving
- Mirta Miller as Kala
- Victor Alcazar (credited as Vic Winner) as Dr. Lawrence Redgrave
- Maria Kosti as Elsie
- Aurora de Alba as Olivia Mortimer
- Luis Ciges as MacMurdo
- Antonio Pica as Superintendent Hawkins
- Pierre Besari as Ti Zachary

== Release ==
All Seasons Entertainment released the film on VHS in the United States in the 1980s in its original Vengeance of the Zombies version with the red warning flashes removed, while Vogue Video in Canada released it on VHS in the altered Walk of the Dead version with the red warning flashes intact.

Deimos Entertainment, a subdivision of BCI Eclipse, released a special edition DVD in 2007.

Shout Factory released it on Blu-ray as Vengeance of the Zombies as part of their Paul Naschy Collection.

== Reception ==
Steve Barton of Dread Central rated it 4/5 stars and wrote, "Sexy, erotic, scary, and disturbing, Vengeance of the Zombies has it all!" Bloody Disgusting rated it 4/5 stars and wrote, "Vengeance of the Zombies is an exemplary reason as to why we should celebrate forgotten films. The film manages to play off of its unoriginality in the most entertaining way possible, catering to fans of deliciously cheesy cinema." Adam Tyner of DVD Talk wrote, "Naschy likened the movie to a drug-induced nightmare in his autobiography, and it's every bit as odd and incoherent as that suggests." Rafael Gamboa of DVD Verdict called it enjoyably bad. Writing in The Zombie Movie Encyclopedia, academic Peter Dendle called it "a plodding and unengaging zombie mystery".
