= Tomb of the Werewolf =

- Home video cover art
- Directed by: Fred Olen Ray
- Written by: Fred Olen Ray (as Sherman Scott)
- Produced by: Kimberly A. Ray
- Starring: Paul Naschy; Jay Richardson; Michelle Bauer
- Cinematography: Gary Graver
- Edited by: Dean McKendrick
- Distributed by: Retromedia Entertainment
- Release date: June 8, 2004
- Running time: 82 min
- Country: United States
- Language: English

Tomb of the Werewolf (aka The Unliving) is a 2003 film directed by Fred Olen Ray. It is the twelfth and last in a long series of films about the werewolf Count Waldemar Daninsky, played by Paul Naschy. The film contains a number of adult sex scenes bordering on softcore pornography. The film was shot on Video in 2003 and first distributed directly to VHS (in edited form) as Tomb of the Werewolf in June 2004. It was later reissued as an uncensored DVD (with bonus behind the scenes material) in 2015 as The Unliving by Retromedia Entertainment. Director Ray said years later in an interview that the film never made a profit.

== Plot ==
Richard Daninsky, the descendant of a werewolf named Waldemar Daninsky, inherits a castle that may have hidden treasure and takes a reality show TV crew along to document his search. Vampire Elizabeth Bathory gets Richard Daninsky to remove a silver dagger from the body of his ancestor Waldemar Daninsky, whose corpse has been residing in a crypt beneath the castle for many decades, causing Waldemar to revive and go on a rampage as a werewolf.

== Cast ==
- Paul Naschy as Count Waldemar Daninsky, Richard's werewolf ancestor
- Jay Richardson as Richard Daninsky
- Michelle Bauer as Elizabeth Bathory, an evil countess
- Stephanie Bentley in a dual role as Amanda / Eleanor Daninsky
- Danielle Petty as Melanie, a TV crew member
- Lacy Andrews as Christie, a TV crew member
- Beverly Lynne as Leslie, a TV crew member
- Leland Jay as Tony, a TV crew member

== Production ==
Naschy traveled to Hollywood briefly in 2003 to appear in two filmed-on-video (adult content) horror films directed by Donald F. Glut and Fred Olen Ray, two former horror fans-turned-directors who must have treated him like royalty on the set. The other film he made that week was Countess Dracula's Orgy of Blood (2003).

(Filming got a bit complicated since Naschy had never learned to speak English. Also Naschy had brought his wife and son Sergio along with him, and the day after they arrived, his wife was hospitalized with a stomach virus, so Naschy was a bit preoccupied during the shoot.)

While in the States, Naschy visited Universal Studios and the famous "Ackermansion" museum of Forrest J Ackerman, editor of the legendary magazine Famous Monsters of Filmland. Cameraman Gary Graver used to work for horror filmmaker Al Adamson back in the early 1970s.
