= Paul Naschy =

Spanish actor and filmmaker (1934–2009)

- Born: Jacinto Molina Álvarez; 6 September 1934; Madrid, Spain
- Died: 30 November 2009 (aged 75); Madrid, Spain
- Occupations: Actor; film director; screenwriter
- Spouse: Elvira Primavera (m. 1969)
- Children: 2 sons (Bruno and Sergio Molina)
- Honours: Gold Medal of Merit in the Fine Arts

Jacinto Molina Álvarez (September 6, 1934 – November 30, 2009) known by his stage name Paul Naschy, was a Spanish actor and filmmaker, who worked primarily in the horror genre. His portrayals of numerous classic horror figures—The Wolfman, Frankenstein's monster, Count Dracula, Quasimodo, Fu Manchu and a mummy—earned him recognition as the Spanish Lon Chaney.

Naschy also starred in dozens of action films, historical dramas, crime films, TV shows and documentaries. He also wrote the screenplays for most of his films and directed a number of them as well, signing many of them under his real name "Jacinto Molina". He was bestowed Spain's Gold Medal of Merit in the Fine Arts in 2001.

== Early life ==
Naschy was born as Jacinto Molina Alvarez in Madrid in 1934, and grew up during the Spanish Civil War, a period of great turmoil in Spanish history. His father Enrique Molina (born in 1910) was a successful furrier, and Naschy grew up in very comfortable surroundings, at one point living in his parents' country mansion. During his upbringing, he briefly had a friendship with José María Jarabo, who later gained infamy as a spree killer and was executed in July 1959.

Naschy went to college initially to become either a surveyor or an architect. After college, he started a career as a professional weightlifter, winning a number of prestigious awards, but soon gravitated to acting and filmmaking. His favorite film character from childhood was the Wolf Man, dating back to when he saw the classic Universal film Frankenstein Meets the Wolf Man (1943) as a child. He attempted to design record album covers, write pulp western novels and draw comic books, but he did not meet with much success. In his 20s, Naschy moved back and forth between professional weightlifting and acting, but was unable to secure important roles, usually obtaining bit parts.

== Career ==
=== Early roles ===
Naschy had an uncredited bit part in the classic 1961 Biblical epic King of Kings and the experience drew him further into filmmaking. Naschy also played uncredited bit parts in the following films: El príncipe encadenado / The Prince in Chains (1960, a.k.a. King of the Vikings, shaving his head to play a Mongol chieftain); Operation Plus Ultra (1966, playing a masked surgeon); Las Viudas / The Widows (1966, hired as an assistant director in the "Luna de Miel" segment only); and La Esclava del Paraiso / 1001 Nights (1968 film) (1968) playing a palace servant named Chantal. Naschy allegedly acted as the assistant director on two other films, Aventura en el Palacio Viejo (1967) and Cronica de Nueve Meses (1967)

In 1966, while appearing as an extra in an episode of the American TV show I Spy that was being filmed in a remote country site in Spain, Naschy met horror icon Boris Karloff on the set. (Karloff was in a very poor mood that day, noticeably depressed and in poor health.) This encounter led to a 2010 posthumously-produced biopic on Naschy being titled Paul Naschy: The Man Who Saw Frankenstein Cry.

=== Horror Icon ===
In 1968, at age 34, Naschy wrote a screenplay for a werewolf movie entitled The Mark of the Wolfman (about a Polish werewolf named Count Waldemar Daninsky) and managed to interest a Spanish film company called Maxper Producciones Cinematograficas into financing it. Naschy never intended to play "El Hombre Lobo" (as the doomed lycanthrope came to be called in Spain), but he wound up with the part when the producer could not find a suitable actor (they had tried to hire Lon Chaney Jr., but at age 62, the Hollywood horror star was unable to travel due to health issues).

The German distributors insisted he change his name from Jacinto Molina because it sounded too Spanish, which would have hurt the film's chances at the box offices in various countries outside of Spain. He created the name "Paul Naschy".... "Paul" after Pope Paul VI, and "Naschy" as a Germanic sounding version of "Imre Nagy", one of Naschy's weightlifting idols. Naschy later wrote and starred in eleven sequels featuring his Waldemar Daninsky werewolf character, and spun off a successful acting and screenwriting career in the process.

Naschy wrote the screenplays for most of the films he starred in, especially the horror movies. His most prolific year was 1972, during which time he wrote and starred in no less than seven movies.

During the 1970s, he worked for some of the best European horror film directors in the business, including León Klimovsky, Carlos Aured, Javier Aguirre, José Luis Madrid, Juan Piquer Simón, Francisco Lara Polop and José Luis Merino. Naschy's favorite director was León Klimovsky, with whom he made eight films. Naschy praised Klimovsky's professional workmanlike attitude, but he always felt that Klimovsky never allowed for enough retakes that might have improved some of their films. He also enjoyed working for director Carlos Aured, and was proud of the films they did together. Naschy also always praised Spanish actor Eduardo Fajardo as being supportive of Naschy when he was down and out. Naschy's favorite co-star (and co-producer) was Julia Saly, and he worked with her on fourteen of his films.

=== Career downturn ===
In 1976, he decided to try his hand at directing as well, choosing the costume drama Inquisition as his first project. He did well for eight years, even producing and directing a number of successful Japanese/Spanish co-productions and made-for-Spanish-TV documentaries, but by 1985, his feature films were no longer breaking even, and after losing a lot of money on his ill-conceived spy spoof Operation Mantis (1985), Naschy's production company, Aconito Films, wound up in bankruptcy. (Aconito is the scientific term for wolfsbane). Naschy had three partners in the company: Augusto Boue (who dumped his shares in the business when things got bad), Masurao Takeda (who died from pancreatic cancer soon after the bankruptcy) and Julia Saly (who retired from acting completely after Mantis flopped).

On June 20, 1984, Naschy's father Enrique Molina died of a heart attack while fishing alone on the shores of a lake (he was 74). Some boys playing by the lake discovered his body in the woods, too late to revive him. The unexpected sudden loss of his father (with whom he had always been very close), coinciding with the bankruptcy of his film company, plunged Naschy into a two-year period of depression. No one in the film industry wanted to finance projects with him, and some of his best friends turned their backs on him when he needed them the most. Naschy claimed in interviews that he even considered suicide during this period.

He only returned to filmmaking in 1987 with his supposed "comeback film" El Aullido del Diablo (The Howl of the Devil). Naschy wrote, directed and starred in the film along with his son Sergio and famed horror icons Howard Vernon and Caroline Munro. The film was very poorly distributed (shown only on local Spanish TV), and was broadly commercially unavailable until 2021, when Mondo Macabro released a restored version on blu-ray.

Naschy's career took a second downturn when he suffered a near-fatal heart attack himself on August 27, 1991, triggered by weightlifting in a local gym. He was hospitalized for more than a week, then had major heart surgery performed on September 5. A rumor circulated throughout horror film fandom that Naschy had died, since he disappeared from the film scene for a while after his operation. He had to later contact a number of fanzine publishers in various countries to inform them that he was still alive.

=== Later works ===
In 1996, Naschy wrote and starred in his 11th werewolf film Licántropo, which he thought would be a big comeback film for him, but the movie did not do well at all, critically or financially. He continued to appear in a number of low budget horror films and crime dramas, however, during the following decade, during which time he won a number of prestigious fan awards and appeared as a celebrated guest at many horror film conventions during the 1990s and the 2000s (both in the United States and in Europe). But he was still doing poorly financially, and complained bitterly in interviews about the state of the corrupt Spanish film industry which he said practiced favoritism and cronyism. In 1997, Naschy wrote a detailed autobiography entitled Paul Naschy: Memoirs of a Wolf Man (which included his filmography as well).

Naschy traveled to Hollywood briefly in 2003 to appear in two shot-on-video (adult content) horror films directed by Donald F. Glut and Fred Olen Ray, two former horror fans-turned-directors who idolized him. Filming was complicated by a language barrier as Naschy had never learned to speak English. Also, Naschy had brought his wife and son Sergio along with him, and the day after they arrived, his wife was hospitalized with a stomach virus, so Naschy was a bit preoccupied during the shoot. During his sojourn in Hollywood, Naschy visited Universal Studios as well as the famed "Ackermansion" museum of Forrest J Ackerman, the editor of the legendary magazine Famous Monsters of Filmland.

== Most famous characters ==
The werewolf Count Waldemar Daninsky (known in Spain as El Hombre Lobo) is Paul Naschy's most famous horror character, since he played Daninsky in 12 different films (13, if you count his cameo in El Aullido del Diablo). In fact, Naschy holds the record for the greatest number of roles as a werewolf, easily beating out Lon Chaney Jr., who played a werewolf only seven times during his career (even counting his House of Terror (1960 film) and his appearance on Route 66 (TV series).)

Unlike the Chaney Universal films, however, which formed a somewhat chronological storyline from picture to picture, Naschy's Daninsky films were not connected to each other plotwise. Each film was more or less a free-standing story that was not meant to relate to the other films in the series in the way the old Universal films did. Daninsky's lycanthropy had a different origin in each film. This was probably for the best, however, since in the 1970s, European horror films were often theatrically distributed in the U.S. several years after they were completed, and they probably would have all been released out of order.

Naschy's only other recurring character was the villainous medieval warlock Alaric de Marnac (who appeared in Naschy's Horror Rises from the Tomb (1972) and returned to life again in a sequel, Panic Beats (1983)). Naschy claims he based this character on a real-life medieval nobleman named Gilles de Rais, a serial killer on whose life story Naschy also based the lead character in his 1974 film El Mariscal del Infierno (The Devil's Possessed)

== Honors ==
In 2001, Naschy was awarded the Gold Medal of Merit in the Fine Arts by King Juan Carlos I, in recognition of his contributions to Spanish cinema.

== Personal life ==
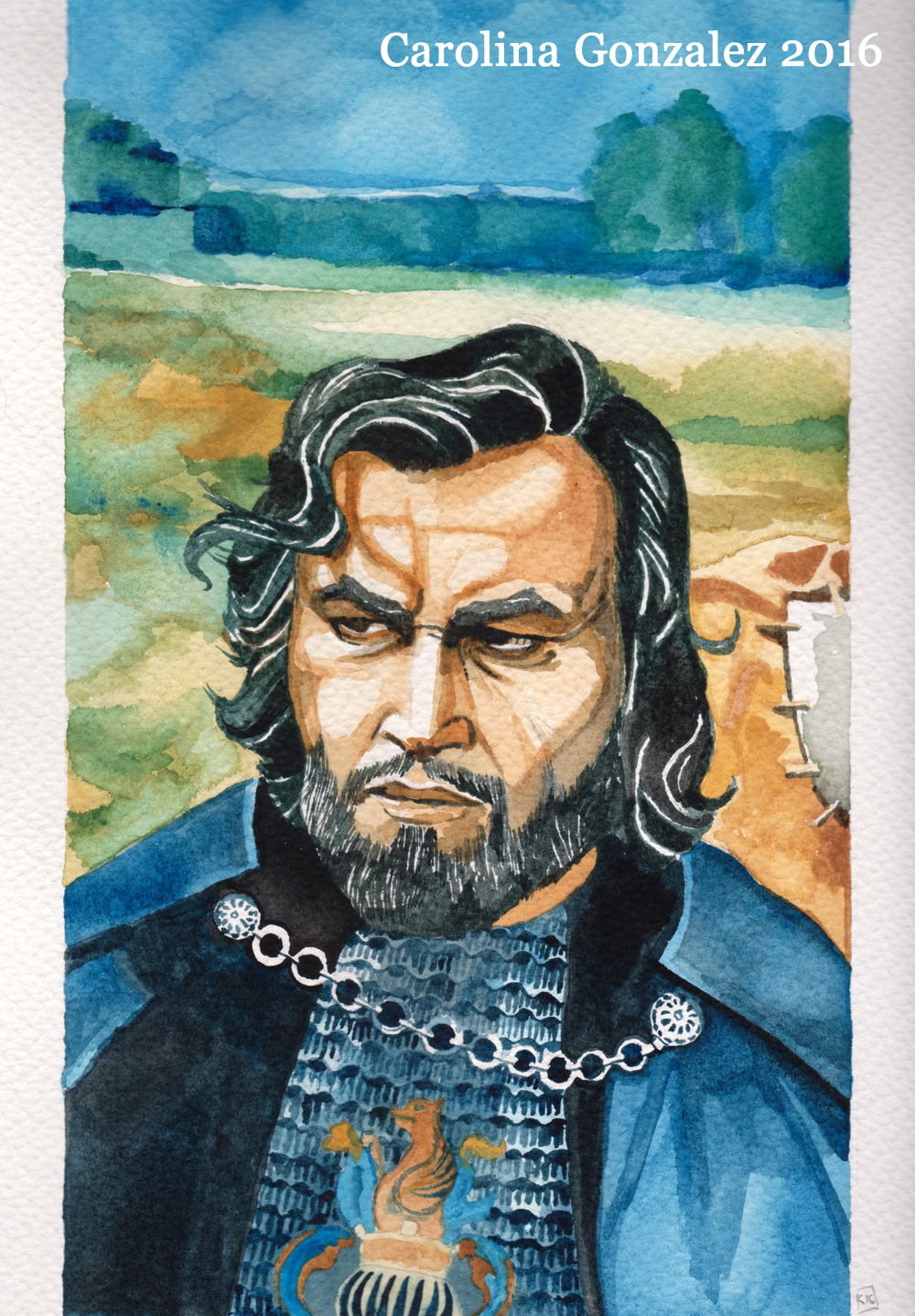
Portrait of Naschy as Alaric de Marnac by Carolina Gonzalez (2016).

On October 24, 1969, Naschy married Elvira Primavera, the daughter of an Italian diplomat living in Spain, and they remained happily married 40 years later at the time of his death. His wife was always very supportive of his filmmaking projects. The couple had two sons, Bruno and Sergio.

=== Illness and death ===
Naschy was diagnosed with pancreatic cancer in 2008 and died on November 30, 2009, at a hospital in Madrid, Spain at the age of 75.

== Legacy ==
Although his life ended in poor financial straits, Naschy always received outpouring of love from his fans at the conventions he attended and continues to be regarded as a major horror film icon.

A hardcover book entitled Muchas Gracias, Señor Lobo was published in Germany after Naschy's death, collecting hundreds of rare photos, lobby cards, posters, etc. that had been used to promote Naschy's films over the decades in a number of different countries. A comprehensive film biography entitled Paul Naschy: The Man Who Saw Frankenstein Cry (a reference to Naschy's meeting Boris Karloff on the set of "I Spy" in 1966) has also been released on DVD.

== The Hombre Lobo Series ==
Naschy's 12 Hombre Lobo films are not a series in the strictest sense. They seem to be a collection of unrelated plotlines, but all of which involve a werewolf named Count Waldemar Daninsky. Both La Furia del Hombre Lobo (1970) and La Maldicion de la Bestia (1975) refer to an origin involving Waldemar's being bitten by a yeti (and there is a brief yeti reference in La Noche de Walpurgis (1970) as well), but the other films presented him with entirely different origin stories. The fact that these films have also been retitled by the various film distributors many times over the years only adds to the confusion. Despite the numerous plot inconsistencies and convoluted flashbacks, however, Naschy's Wolf Man series as a whole is still considered his most famous work by most of his many fans. Only 11 of the 12 Hombre Lobo films actually exist today. Las Noches del Hombre Lobo (1968), which Naschy claimed was the 2nd film in the series, is considered a lost film today (and may never actually have existed).

In order of production, the 12 Hombre Lobo films are as follows:

1. La Marca del Hombre Lobo / The Mark of the Wolf Man (1968) a.k.a. Frankenstein's Bloody Terror (U.S.), a.k.a. The Vampires of Dr. Dracula (Germany/France), a.k.a. Hell's Creatures (U.K./Australia), a.k.a. The Nights of Satan (Italy), a.k.a. Hell Creature (Pakistan/Turkey) and re-released years later in Germany as Hexen des Grauens / The Witches of Horror; directed by Enrique Eguiluz; originally filmed in 3-D and Hi-Fi 70mm, but it was only shown that way in Munich, Germany; first released theatrically in Spain in July 1968; in Germany in Feb. 1969; in England in Feb. 1970; and in the U.S. in a shortened version as Frankenstein's Bloody Terror in 1971; released to U.S. late-night television (edited) in 1974; released on DVD (unedited/ letterboxed) as Frankenstein's Bloody Terror.
2. Las Noches del Hombre Lobo / The Nights of the Wolf Man (1968) directed in Paris allegedly by "Rene Govar". This is a lost film today, and no one (not even Paul Naschy) has ever seen it. But Naschy insisted that he wrote the screenplay and stayed in Paris for a week to star in it. The French director of the film, Rene Govar (who suspiciously only directed this one film), is said to have died in a car accident in Paris a week after the filming was completed, and no one ever paid the lab bill that was outstanding. Hence it is thought the lab confiscated the negative and probably just discarded it later. Naschy claimed he only became aware decades later that the film had never been released anywhere. Some Naschy historians think the project was scrapped before it was greenlighted and the script was later rewritten to become the fourth film in the series, La Furia del Hombre Lobo (1970). This is very possible, since Naschy remembered both films had virtually the same plot. No reference books have ever turned up any stills from the film or information on its director, Rene Govar. Naschy himself could not even recall the names of any of his co-stars on the project, but it remains on the list since Naschy swore the film existed.
3. Los Monstruos del Terror / The Monsters of Terror (1969) a.k.a. Dracula vs. Frankenstein (U.K./France/Germany/Yugoslavia), a.k.a. Dracula and the Wolf Man vs. Frankenstein (Belgium), a.k.a. Operation Terror (Mexico), a.k.a. Reincarnator (French re-release title), a.k.a. Assignment Terror (U.S. TV title); the film's original shooting title was The Man Who Came From Ummo; co-directed by Hugo Fregonese and Tulio Demichelli (who finished the film after Fregonese quit midway through); first released theatrically in Germany on February 27, 1970, and in Spain on August 28, 1971; shown in the U.S. (on late night TV only) in 1973 as Assignment Terror (because the title Dracula vs. Frankenstein had already been used in the U.S. by Al Adamson for his 1971 film); eventually released on U.S. video (in splicy pan-and-scan format) as Dracula vs. Frankenstein; released on Blu-ray in the United States by Scorpion Releasing in 2019.
4. La Furia del Hombre Lobo / The Fury of the Wolf Man (1970) a.k.a. Wolf Man Never Sleeps (Sweden); directed by Jose Maria Zabalza; only released theatrically (edited) in Spain and Argentina in 1975; shown in the U.S. (on late night TV only) in 1974 (edited) as Fury of the Wolf Man; released on video/ DVD as Fury of the Wolf Man (the DVDs are edited, and the old Charter Video VHS edition actually contains more nudity than the DVD release). The Swedish theatrical version Wolf Man Never Sleeps (sic) is the most complete of all. Released on blu-ray by Scorpion Releasing in the United States in 2020.
5. La Noche de Walpurgis / Walpurgis Night (1970) a.k.a. The Werewolf vs. the Vampire Woman (U.S.), a.k.a. Shadow of the Werewolf (U.K.), a.k.a. Night of the Vampires (Germany), a.k.a. Night of the Bloody Witches (Germany, re-release title), a.k.a. The Black Mass of Countess Dracula (Italy), a.k.a. Werewolf Shadow (Canada), a.k.a. Fury of the Vampires (France), a.k.a. Night of the Werewolves (Belgium); directed by León Klimovsky; Naschy's most famous and highest-grossing horror film, this was made in 70mm Stereo Technicolor; first released theatrically in Spain in May 1971, in Germany in October 1971 and in England in Oct. 1972; released theatrically in the U.S. in 1972 as The Werewolf vs. the Vampire Woman (accompanied by a movie tie-in novelization in paperback); released on VHS as both Blood Moon and The Werewolf vs. the Vampire Woman; released later on DVD uncut as Werewolf Shadow (sic).
6. Dr. Jekyll y el Hombre Lobo / Dr. Jekyll and the Wolfman (1971) a.k.a. Dr. Jekyll and the Werewolf (U.K.), a.k.a. Night of the Bloody Wolves (Germany); directed by León Klimovsky, co-starring Jack Taylor; first released theatrically in Spain on November 19, 1972, in Germany on April 19, 1974, and in the U.K. in 1974; released theatrically in the U.S. in 1973 as Dr. Jekyll and the Wolfman; available on DVD uncut (in Spanish/subtitled) as Dr. Jekyll and the Wolfman.
7. El Retorno de Walpurgis / The Return of Walpurgis (1973) a.k.a. Curse of the Devil (U.S./U.K./Canada), a.k.a. Night of the Diabolical Orgy (Germany), a.k.a. Die Todeskralle des Grausamen Wolfes / Death Claws of the Cruel Wolf (alternate German title), a.k.a. Night of the Killer (Mexico), a.k.a. L'Empreinte de Dracula / The Mark of Dracula (France), a.k.a. Return of the Loup Garous (Belgium); directed by Carlos Aured; first released theatrically in Spain on September 21, 1973, and in Germany and England in August 1974; it was only released theatrically in the U.S. in 1976 as Curse of the Devil; released on DVD uncut as Curse of the Devil, and on a German Blu-ray from Subkultur as Die Todeskralle des Grausamen Wolfes.
8. La Maldicion de la Bestia / The Curse of the Beast (1975) a.k.a. Night of the Howling Beast (U.S.), a.k.a. The Werewolf and the Yeti (international release title), a.k.a. In the Claws of the Werewolf (France), a.k.a. Curse of the Beast (Mexico), a.k.a. Loup Garou / The Werewolf (Belgium); directed by Miguel Iglesias Bonns; Naschy won Best Actor Award for "Curse of the Beast" at the October 1975 Sitges International Film Festival in Spain; first released theatrically in Spain on January 9, 1975; theatrically released in the U.S. in 1977 as Night of the Howling Beast; released on VHS home video alternately as The Werewolf and the Yeti, Night of the Howling Beast, and Hall of the Mountain King; released on Blu-ray by Shout Factory as part of their Paul Naschy Collection.
9. El Retorno del Hombre Lobo / The Return of the Wolf Man (1980) a.k.a. The Craving (U.S.), a.k.a. The Werewolf (Germany), Night of the Werewolf (later DVD release title); written and directed by Paul Naschy; this was Naschy's all-time favorite Hombre Lobo film, being a remake of his earlier Walpurgis Night; first released theatrically in Spain and Mexico in 1981 and in Germany in 1984; released theatrically in the U.S. in 1985 as The Craving; released on U.S. home video in 1986 as The Craving; recently released on Blu-ray as Night of the Werewolf.
10. La Bestia y la Espada Magica / The Beast and the Magic Sword (1983); a Spanish/Japanese co-production; written, co-produced and directed by Paul Naschy; Naschy's wife and two sons appeared in a brief cameo in this film; released theatrically only in Spain in Nov. 1983; never released theatrically in Japan; never dubbed into English nor shown in the U.S.; released to Blu-ray by Mondo Macabro in 2020.
11. Licántropo: El Asesino de la Luna Llena / Licantropo: the Full Moon Killer (1996), a.k.a. Lycanthropus: The Moonlight Murders (U.S.); directed by Francisco Gordillo; film was only shown theatrically in Spain in April 1997; no U.S. theatrical release; released directly to U.S. DVD dubbed into English as Lycanthropus: The Full Moon Killer.
12. Tomb of the Werewolf (2004); directed in Hollywood by Fred Olen Ray, co-starring Michelle Bauer; the original shooting title was The Unliving; filmed on video in English (Naschy did not know English so he spoke his lines phonetically); no theatrical release; distributed directly to DVD (edited) as Tomb of the Werewolf in 2004 and then later reissued as an uncensored DVD (with behind the scenes material) as The Unliving by Retromedia Entertainment in 2015.

Naschy played generic werewolves in four other films that were not part of the Hombre Lobo series....

- Buenas Noches, Señor Monstruo / Good Night, Mr. Monster (1982) Naschy played a generic werewolf in this children's Spanish TV musical/comedy; he reportedly did the show just for the money; never shown outside of Spain; never dubbed into English.
- El Aullido del Diablo / The Howl of the Devil (1987) written and directed by Paul Naschy, co-starring Caroline Munro, Howard Vernon and Naschy's real-life son Sergio Molina in a major role; Naschy plays an insane ex-actor who dresses up as various famous monsters in this film, in one scene specifically playing the werewolf Waldemar Daninsky (Sergio actually addresses the werewolf as "Waldemar" in the scene), but it is only a very brief cameo; no theatrical release anywhere; shown only on Spanish TV in 1988; never dubbed into English; finally became available on Blu-ray from Mondo Macabro in 2021 (in Spanish/ subtitled).
- Aqui Huele A Muerto (Pues Yo No He Sido) / It Smells Like Death Here (Well, It Wasn't Me) (1990); directed by Alvaro de Heredia and starring Spanish comedians "Martes y Trece" (Josema Yuste and Millan Salcedo), Naschy is limited to a glorified cameo which climaxes in an all-out monster mash reminiscent of the Universal Monsters movies, but in which he of course plays a generic werewolf; never dubbed into English nor shown outside of Spain; a Region 2 DVD is available, however.
- Um Lobisomem na Amazônia / A Werewolf in The Amazon (2005) a.k.a. Amazonia Misteriosa; filmed in Brazil, directed by Ivan Cardoso; Naschy plays a mad doctor who transforms into a werewolf in this ultra-modern semi-sequel to H. G. Wells' novel The Island of Dr. Moreau; Naschy's real voice can be heard throughout the film speaking all his lines in Spanish; the film was never dubbed into English nor shown theatrically outside of Spain and Brazil; available in Spanish/subtitled on DVD from Camp Motion Pictures.

== Filmography ==
Note* - Paul Naschy starred in many other horror films that did not feature el Hombre Lobo, as well as a number of crime films, historical dramas, action thrillers, etc. Below is the complete list of all his movies, in strict chronological order of production.

- I Spy (American television series) 1966, Naschy played a very, very small part in the episode titled "Mainly on the Plains", which starred Boris Karloff, Robert Culp and Bill Cosby (he plays one of a group of teenagers having a picnic in one very brief sequence, although Karloff was in the scene with them). Broadcast February, 1967
- Agonizando en el Crimen (Agonizing in Crime) 1967, directed by Enrique Eguiluz (a crime drama) (never dubbed in English or released in the U.S.); Naschy played one of the police officials hunting a serial killer, credited as David Molba (Naschy later used his friendship with director Eguiluz to get his film The Mark of the Wolf Man made).
- La Furia de Johnny Kidd (Fury of Johnny Kid) 1967, a.k.a. Ultimate Gunfighter, a.k.a. Dove si Spara di Piu; an Italian/Spanish co-production directed by Gianni Puccini, who died in Italy soon after finishing the film; Naschy had a very small uncredited role in this spaghetti Western, in which he is shown arm-wrestling another gunfighter in a bar (never released in the U.S.) Available on DVD subtitled only
- La Marca del Hombre Lobo (The Mark of the Wolf Man) 1968, directed by Enrique Eguiluz (a.k.a. Frankenstein's Bloody Terror, a.k.a. Hell's Creatures).
- Las Noches del Hombre Lobo (The Nights of the Wolf Man) 1968, directed by Rene Govar (a lost film today, if indeed it was actually completed); this film was never released anywhere, but Naschy insisted he starred in it!
- Plan Jack 03 / Plan Jack Cero Tres (1968) a short film noir spoof written and directed by Cecilia Bartolome as a college project; Naschy plays a Humphrey Bogart-type character (never released in the U.S.).
- Los Monstruos del Terror (The Monsters of Terror) 1969, directed by Hugo Fregonese and Tulio Demichelli (a.k.a. Assignment Terror, a.k.a. Dracula vs. Frankenstein).
- La Furia del Hombre Lobo (The Fury of the Wolf Man) 1970, directed by Jose Maria Zabalza.
- El Vertigo del Crimen (The Vertigo of Crime) 1970, a.k.a. Bombones para Cecilia; a crime drama directed by Pascual Cervera; Naschy plays a sadistic criminal gang leader (never released in the U.S.).
- La Noche de Walpurgis (Walpurgis Night) 1970, directed by Leon Klimovsky (a.k.a. Werewolf Shadow, a.k.a. The Werewolf vs the Vampire Woman).
- Dr. Jekyll y el Hombre Lobo (Dr. Jekyll and the Wolf Man) 1971, directed by Leon Klimovsky.
- Jack el Destripador de Londres (Jack the Ripper of London) 1971, a.k.a. Seven Murders for Scotland Yard (U.S.), a.k.a. Sette Cadaveri per Scotland Yard / Seven Corpses for Scotland Yard (Italy); a giallo directed by Jose Luis Madrid; first released in Italy in 1971 and in Spain in July 1972; released theatrically in the U.S. in 1976 as Seven Murders for Scotland Yard.
- Los Crimenes de Petiot (The Crimes of Petiot) 1972, a crime drama directed by Jose Luis Madrid; Naschy plays Boris Villowa, who is secretly a serial killer named Marcel Petiot; Petiot was a serial killer in real life, but the film does not follow his story closely; filmed in Berlin in January 1972 in Techniscope; released only in Spain in July 1973 (never dubbed in English nor released legally on DVD).
- El Espanto Surge de la Tumba (Horror Rises From the Tomb) 1972, a.k.a. Blood Mass for the Devil (Germany), a.k.a. Blood Mass of the Zombies (1980 German re-release title), a.k.a. Horror Rises From the Tomb (U.S. and England); the Spanish title technically translates as either "Fright Rises From the Grave" or "The Spook Rises From the Grave" (as "el Espanto" does not translate as "horror" in Spanish); Naschy plays a dual role in this film; also starred Helga Line and Emma Cohen; directed by Carlos Aured, this film introduced the medieval warlock Alaric de Marnac, who returned later in Naschy's 1983 sequel Panic Beats; filmed at Naschy's father's palatial estate; first released in Spain in April 1973 and in Germany in March 1976; released theatrically in the U.S. in a Spanish-language print called El Espanto Surge de la Tumba for Spanish theaters only, then later released to U.S. Cable TV in 1974 in English (edited) as Horror Rises From the Tomb; later released to VHS and DVD (unedited) as Horror Rises From the Tomb.
- La Orgia de los Muertos (Orgy of the Dead) 1972, a.k.a. The Hanging Woman (U.S.), a.k.a. Zombies - Terror of the Living Dead (U.K.), a.k.a. Les Orgies Macabres (France), a.k.a. Bracula, Terror of the Living Dead (Australia); directed by Jose Luis Merino in March 1972; first released in Spain in 1974, and in Germany in April 1976 as Der Totenchor der Knochenmanner/ Death Chorus of the Skeletons; re-released in Germany in 1977 as Die Bestie aus dem Totenreich/ The Beast from the Death Realm; it was shown in the U.K. on a double bill with the Italian horror film Baba Yaga; released theatrically in the U.S. in 1974 as The Hanging Woman, and later reissued as Beyond the Living Dead; released on VHS and DVD as The Hanging Woman, Return of the Zombies and Beyond the Living Dead.
- La rebelión de las muertas (Rebellion of the Dead Women) 1972, (a.k.a. Walk of the Dead (US/Canadian 1974 release title), a.k.a. Vengeance of the Zombies (1974 international release title), a.k.a. Rebellion of the Living Dead (Feb. 1974 German release title), a.k.a. Invocation of the Devil (April 1974 German re-release title), a.k.a. Blood Lust of the Zombies (yet another 1980 German re-release title), a.k.a. Revenge of the Living Dead (Italy); directed by Leon Klimovsky; at least three differently edited versions of this film exist; first theatrically released in Spain on June 27, 1973, and in Germany in February 1974; released theatrically in the U.S. in December 1973 as Vengeance of the Zombies, then re-released in the U.S. in May 1980 as Walk of the Dead; released on VHS and DVD as Vengeance of the Zombies.
- El Gran Amor de Conde Dracula (Count Dracula's Great Love) 1972, a.k.a. Count Dracula's Great Love (U.S.), a.k.a. Dracula's Virgin Lovers (U.K.), a.k.a. The Diabolical Loves of Nosferatu (Italy), a.k.a. La Orgia de Dracula (Mexico); directed by Javier Aguirre; first released in Spain on May 12, 1973; released in the U.S. and England in 1974 as Count Dracula's Great Love and Dracula's Virgin Lovers, respectively; re-released in the U.S. in 1979 as Cemetery Girls; released to dvd as both Cemetery Girls and Count Dracula's Great Love. (Note: contrary to some sources, this film was never released under the title Vampire Playgirls).
- El Jorobado de la Morgue (Hunchback of the Morgue) 1972, directed by Javier Aguirre; One of Naschy's all-time greatest horror films (Naschy won Best Actor Award for "Hunchback" at the 1973 Paris Festival of Fantastic Films); first released in Spain on July 13, 1973, in Germany on February 8, 1974 as Die Stunde der Grausamen Leichen/The Hour of the Cruel Corpses, and in Italy as Il Mostro dell'Obitorio; theatrically released in the U.S. in September 1975 as Hunchback of the Morgue; released on VHS video in the U.S. as The Rue Morgue Massacres; released on DVD and on Shout Factory's Blu-ray as part of their Paul Naschy Collection 2 Blu-ray set as Hunchback of the Morgue.
- Disco Rojo, 1972 (a.k.a. La Ruleta Paulista); a Spanish-Portuguese action film directed by Rafael Romero Marchent; Naschy played Sergio Meleter, a villainous drug lord (never dubbed in English nor released in the U.S.).
- Los Ojos Azules de la Muneca Rota (The Blue Eyes of the Broken Doll) 1973, a.k.a. House of Psychotic Women (VHS title); directed by Carlos Aured; first released in Spain in August 1974, and in the U.S. in April 1976; a slightly edited version exists that is missing a scene in which a pig is slaughtered on screen; released on VHS as House of Psychotic Women (slightly edited), released direct to TV in the U.S. as House of Doom (even more heavily edited); released on DVD as Blue Eyes of the Broken Doll (complete and unedited).
- La Venganza de la Momia (The Mummy's Revenge) 1973, Naschy plays a dual role in this film as both the Mummy and his modern day descendant; directed by Carlos Aured, this film was produced in both a censored version (for Spain and Mexico) and an international version containing nudity, but the uncensored version appears to have never been shown anywhere and apparently no longer even exists; first released only in Spain and Mexico in 1973, then later re-released in Spain on October 27, 1975; an English-dubbed version was shown in terrible full-screen pan-and-scan in 1974 in the U.S. (shown on cable TV only) as The Mummy's Revenge; that English-dubbed version is available on low quality bootleg VHS only; a beautiful print is available today letterboxed on DVD but it is in Spanish only (with English subtitles).
- Último deseo (The Final Desire) filmed in April 1973, a.k.a. The People Who Own the Dark (1979 U.S. release title with a new music soundtrack substituted); film's original working title was to be Planeta Ciego; directed by León Klimovsky, written by Vicente Aranda and Joaquin Jorda, and co-starring Julia Saly, Antonio Mayans, Maria Perschy and Nadiuska; this film was made in both an edited "clothed" and unedited "nude" version; the film first premiered in May 1976 at the Cannes Film Market; it was not theatrically released in Spain until November 28, 1976, and in the U.S. in 1979; available on DVD as The People Who Own the Dark, and also on Blu-ray from Code Red.
- El Asesino Esta Entre Los Trece (The Killer is One of Thirteen) filmed in May 1973; a forgettable giallo written and directed by Javier Aguirre, guest-starring Naschy in a very small role as a chauffeur; co-starred Patty Shepard, Jack Taylor and Dyanik Zurakowska; theatrically released only in Spain in 1973; (never dubbed in English nor released in the U.S.)
- Las ratas no duermen de noche (Rats Don't Sleep At Night) filmed in June 1973, a.k.a. Crimson; a Eurocine French/Spanish co-production directed by Juan Fortuny with music by Daniel J. White; first released (censored) in Spain on June 7, 1976; released in France in September 1976 as The Man With the Severed Head; later released on DVD in the more adult version entitled Crimson. (Both versions of the film are now included on the Blu-ray from Kino/Redemption.)
- El Retorno de Walpurgis (The Return of Walpurgis) 1973, directed by Carlos Aured (a.k.a. Curse of the Devil).
- Una Libelula Para Cada Muerto (A Dragonfly For Each Corpse) 1973, a.k.a. Il Giustiziere Sfida la Polizia/ The Vigiliante Challenges the Police (Italian), a.k.a. Redkiller; a giallo directed by Leon Klimovsky and co-starring Erika Blanc; first theatrically released in Spain on November 17, 1975, and in Italy in 1977; it came out on VHS Home Video in Germany in the 1980s asTodeskreis Libelle; never dubbed in English nor shown in the U.S.; recently released on Shout Factory's Blu-Ray as part of their Paul Naschy Collection 2 set (in Spanish/ subtitled).
- Tarzan en las Minas del Rey Salomon (Tarzan in King Solomon's Mines) 1973; directed by Jose Luis Merino, this film was unauthorized by the Edgar Rice Burroughs estate; David Carpenter played Tarzan and Naschy played a big game hunter; co-starred sexy model Nadiuska (whom Naschy disliked working with); theatrically released only in Spain (never dubbed in English nor released in the U.S.)
- Todos los Gritos del Silencio (All the Screams of Silence) made in 1974, a slasher film directed by Ramon Barco (who Naschy said ruined the film); released theatrically only in Spain in August 1976 (never dubbed in English).
- El Mariscal del Infierno (The Marshal from Hell) 1974; a.k.a. The Devil's Possessed (English-dubbed international title); directed by Leon Klimovsky; Naschy's script was based on the true-life medieval activities of Gilles de Rais, who was also Naschy's inspiration for his Alaric de Marnac character; theatrically released in Spain and Belgium in 1974; the international English-dubbed version was apparently released direct to VHS and DVD only as The Devil's Possessed, as well as on Shout Factory's Blu-ray as part of their Paul Naschy Collection 2 set.
- La Diosa Salvaje (The Savage Goddess) made in 1974 (a.k.a. Kilma, la Regina della Jungla / Kilma, Queen of the Jungle (Italy), a.k.a. Tanrica (Turkey)); directed by Miguel Iglesias Bonns, co-starring Maria Perschy; released only in Spain in March 1975 (never dubbed in English)
- Los Pasajeros (The Passengers) made in 1974, a macabre arthouse film directed by Jose Antonio Barrero; Naschy plays an eccentric millionaire named Mr. Aquenatos; released theatrically only in Spain in 1980 (never dubbed in English)
- La cruz del diablo (The Devil's Cross) (1974) based on the works of Gustavo Adolfo Becquer, this film was directed by British Hammer Films veteran John Gilling; Naschy wrote the original screenplay (intending to star in the film as well) but he lost creative control of the project and was replaced in the film by another actor; Naschy later wanted his name removed entirely from the credits, to no avail; theatrically released only in Spain on March 29, 1975; available on DVD in Spanish language/ subtitled only (never dubbed in English nor released in the U.S.).
- Exorcismo (Exorcism) filmed in November 1974, a.k.a. The Nights of Satan (Italy), a.k.a. Night of the Exorcist (Argentina); directed by Juan Bosch; Naschy claimed he wrote this film long before The Exorcist came out; Naschy plays Father Dunning, a heroic role for once; first released in Spain on March 10, 1975; a Spanish language print played in the U.S. in Spanish-speaking theaters only; the film was later released directly to VHS and DVD in the U.S. as Exorcism; also on Shout Factory's Blu-ray as part of their Paul Naschy Collection 2 set.
- La Maldicion de la Bestia (Curse of the Beast) 1975, directed by Miguel Iglesias Bonns (released on VHS as The Werewolf and the Yeti, Hall of the Mountain King (the least complete version of all), and as Night of the Howling Beast); released on Shout Factory's Blu-ray as part of their Paul Naschy Collection 2 set.
- Muerte de un Quinqui (Death of a Hoodlum) 1975, crime drama directed by Leon Klimovsky; Naschy plays Marcos, a crazed criminal who terrorizes a helpless family; co-starred Julia Saly (never dubbed in English nor released in the U.S.).
- Docteur Justice (Dr. Justice) 1975, (a.k.a. Ambicion Fallida / Failed Ambition (Spain)) a.k.a. La Petroliera Fantasma (Italy), a.k.a. Karate Killers; directed by Christian-Jaque; a crime drama based on a French comic book called Dr. Justice; starred Gert (Goldfinger) Fröbe and John Phillip Law; Naschy has only a small part in this film (never dubbed in English or released in the U.S.).
- Inquisicion (Inquisition) 1976, first film ever directed by Paul Naschy; this Italian/Spanish co-production co-starred Julia Saly; first released in Spain in 1978; this film was not theatrically shown anywhere outside of Spain; an English-dubbed version was released directly to VHS (and later DVD) in the U.S. as Inquisition.
- Secuestro (The Kidnapping) made in 1976, a crime drama inspired by the Patricia Hearst case, directed by Leon Klimovsky; Naschy plays one of the kidnappers in the film, and co-wrote the script with Antonio Fos; released only in Spain in June 1977; a fair-quality, subtitled bootleg copy exists (never released in the U.S.).
- Comando Txikia: Muerte de un Presidente (Death of a President) 1977; an action film directed by Jose Luis Madrid; Naschy only acted in this film and did not help to write it; co-starred Julia Saly; it was based on the 1973 real life assassination of Spanish prime minister Carrero Blanco by four anarchists; Naschy plays one of the assassins named Pocholo; shown only in Spain in 1978 (never released in the U.S.).
- El Francotirador (The Sniper) filmed in January 1977, this controversial action film was directed by Carlos Puerto; co-written by Naschy, who also played the lead role of Lucas, the sniper; released only in Spain in January 1978; (never released in the U.S.)
- Pecado Mortal (Mortal Sin) 1977, drama directed by Miguel Angel Diez; Naschy only puts in a very brief cameo appearance in this film playing a police inspector (never released in the U.S.).
- El Transexual (The Transsexual) filmed April 1977, a controversial social drama inspired by the true life story of Brazilian-Spanish transvestite Lorena Capelli, who died during a sex change operation; co-written by Naschy (who also starred in it as Sergio, a journalist) and directed by Jose Jara; shown only in Spain in October 1977 (never released in the U.S.); only a low quality bootleg copy of this film exists today.
- El huerto del francés (The Frenchman's Garden), a.k.a. La Casa que Abre de Noche (Mexico); filmed November 1977; a crime drama based on a true story, co-written (with Antonio Fos) and directed by Paul Naschy (his second directing job); co-starred Julia Saly; Naschy played the lead role of the serial killer "El Francés"; theatrically released only in Spain and Mexico in June 1978 (never dubbed in English or released in the U.S.); Released on Blu-ray by Mondo Macabro.
- Madrid al Desnudo (Naked Madrid) filmed in 1978; a controversial comedy/satire on Madrid's upper class, directed and written by Naschy, based on the 1977 novel by Eduarda Targioni; shown only in Spain in March 1979 (never released in the U.S.).
- El Caminante (The Traveler) filmed September 1978; co-written (with Eduarda Targiani) and directed by Naschy who plays the Devil in this highly acclaimed fantasy film (Naschy won awards for this film in 1978 at Eurocon and in 1979 at both the 9th Annual Fantastic Film Festival in Paris and the International Festival of Imaginary Cinema and Sci-Fi in Madrid); the film was theatrically released only in Spain on April 21, 1980 (never released in the U.S. or anywhere outside of Spain); released on Blu-ray by Mondo Macabro under the title The Devil Incarnate.
- Amor Blanco (1979 Japanese film, a.k.a. Howaito rabu) Naschy produced this film, but did not appear in it; released only in Spain in August 1979 (never released in the U.S.).
- Los Cantabros (The Cantabrians) a Japanese-Spanish co-production filmed in January 1980; this peplum was written and directed by Paul Naschy; Naschy took over this project from Spanish horror film director Amando de Ossorio who had originally been hired to direct it, and Joacquin Gomez who had written the original story idea; Naschy totally rewrote Gomez's script which infuriated him; the film co-starred Julia Saly; shown only in Spain in 1981 (never dubbed in English or released in the U.S.).
- El Carnival de las Bestias (Carnival of the Beasts) 1980, a.k.a. The Pig (an alternate Spanish title was Bestias Humanas / Human Beasts); written and directed by Paul Naschy, this film was a Spanish/Japanese co-production dealing with cannibalism; co-starred Julia Saly; theatrically released only in Spain and Mexico on December 3, 1980; the film was never shown in Japan; later released on DVD as Human Beasts; recently released on Shout Factory's Blu-ray as part of their Paul Naschy Collection set.
- El Retorno del Hombre Lobo (The Return of the Wolf Man) a.k.a. The Craving; filmed August 1980; written and directed by Paul Naschy and co-starring Julia Saly; released in Spain and Mexico (as Return of the Wolf Man) in April 1981, in Germany (as The Werewolf) in 1984, and in the U.S. (as The Craving) in January 1985; released on Shout Factory's Blu-ray box set under the title Night of the Werewolf as part of their Paul Naschy Collection.
- Misterio en la Isla de los Monstruos (Mystery on Monster Island) 1981, a.k.a. Das Geheimnis der Monsterinsel (Germany); directed by Juan Piquer Simon, said to be based on a Jules Verne story; Paul Naschy and Peter Cushing each play a small role in this action-adventure film, but do not share any scenes; theatrically released in Spain, France, Germany and Belgium in 1981; only released directly to TV and VHS in the U.S. and England; released on DVD by 20th Century Fox on a double bill with Gorilla at Large.
- El dragon negro/ The Black Dragon (1981), a Japanese TV miniseries directed by Yasutada Nagano; Naschy played a Mafia drug dealer (never released in the U.S.).
- La Batalla del Porro (The Battle of the Dullard) Released in Spain only in 1981, this comedy was directed by Joan Minguell (never released in the U.S.).
- La mascara negra/ The Black Mask (1982) directed by Jose Paramo; Naschy played a character named Sandro Coltini in episode #6 of this 11-part TV series (never released in the U.S.)
- Buenas Noches, Señor Monstruo (Good Night, Mr. Monster) 1982, directed by Antonio Mercero; Naschy played a generic werewolf in this children's musical comedy (never released in the U.S.).
- Mi Amigo el Vagabundo (My Friend, the Vagabond) filmed January 1983; this Spanish-Japanese co-production was written and directed by and starred Paul Naschy; co-starred Julia Saly and Naschy's son Sergio Molina; it was produced by Naschy's own company Aconito Films; released only in Spain in August 1984 (never released in the U.S.).
- Latidos de Panico (Panic Beats) filmed in March 1983; written and directed by Paul Naschy, this Japanese-Spanish co-production featured the return of Naschy's medieval warlock Alaric de Marnac; this film was the first produced by Naschy's own company "Aconito Films" and co-starred Julia Saly; theatrically released only in Spain on May 20, 1983; later released directly to DVD in the U.S by Mondo Macabro in Spanish/subtitled format only.
- La Bestia y la Espada Magica (The Beast and the Magic Sword) 1983, written and directed by Paul Naschy; this was a Spanish/Japanese co-production; Naschy's wife, Elvira, and his two sons played a cameo in one scene; released only in Spain on November 24, 1983 (never dubbed in English or released theatrically anywhere outside of Spain); the film is available today on DVD in Spanish with subtitles only.
- El Ultimo Kamikaze (The Last Kamikaze) 1983, an action film written and directed by Paul Naschy for his own company Aconito Films; this was a Spanish/Japanese co-production that was shot in Spain, France, the U.S. and Egypt; co-starred Julia Saly; released only in Spain in April 1984 (never released in the U.S.).
- La tercera mujer (The Third Woman) 1984, a 13-episode Japanese TV series directed by Nagano; Naschy plays an Interpol agent hunting a killer; never shown anywhere outside of Japan.
- Operation Mantis (1984) a Japanese-Spanish co-production spy spoof directed by Paul Naschy, and co-starring Julia Saly; this was the film that resulted in Naschy's production company (Aconito Films) going bankrupt; Naschy blamed the screenplay written by Joaquin Oristrell; released only in Spain in February 1985 (never released in the U.S.); Note* - Naschy's father, Enrique Molina, died during this time period.
- Mordiendo la Vida (Biting Life) 1986; a crime drama directed by Martin Garrido; Naschy played a vicious crimelord named El Murciano; never released outside of Spain.
- Pez (1986) a short directed by Santiago Aguilar, R. Barbe and Luis Guridi; Naschy played Dr. Larruskain
- Shh... (1986) a short directed by Santiago Aguilar and Luis Guridi; Naschy just co-starred in it
- El Aullido del Diablo (Howl of the Devil) 1987, written and directed by Paul Naschy (starring Caroline Munro and Howard Vernon); features a brief cameo of Naschy made up as el Hombre Lobo and stars Naschy's son, Sergio Molina, in a major role; released directly to TV (only in Spain) in 1988; (never dubbed in English or released theatrically anywhere); recently released on Blu-ray in Spanish with subtitles.
- Horror en el Musea de Cera (Horror in the Wax Museum) 1988, written and directed by Paul Naschy, shot entirely on video; Naschy played a crazy psychology professor; the film also would've starred his son Sergio, but the project was never completed (a lost film)
- Shadows of Blood (1988), an amateurish crime drama shot entirely on video in the Netherlands; directed by Sydney Ling; Naschy played a serial killer and later said he regretted appearing in this "film" as it turned out to be almost unwatchable (never released in the U.S.).
- El Ultimo Guateque 2 (The Last Dance II) (1988) a drama directed by Juan Jose Porto; Naschy plays a newspaper editor; released only in Spain in June 1988 (never released in the U.S.)
- Aqui Huele a Muerto...Pues yo no he sido! (It Smells Like Death Here... Well, It Wasn't Me!) (1989) a juvenile horror spoof featuring the comedy team of "Martes y Trece", this film was directed by Alvaro de Heredia; intended as an homage to Abbott and Costello Meet Frankenstein; released only in Spain in January 1990 (never released in the U.S.).
- Brigada Central (1990), made for Spanish TV, directed by Pedro Maso; Naschy played a character named Chaves
- La Hija de Fu Manchu '72 (The Daughter of Fu Manchu '72) 1990, a short directed by Santiago Aguilar and Luis Guridi; Naschy played Dr. Fu Manchu; never released outside of Spain.
- Olla de Grillos/ Madhouse (1991) a.k.a. Bedlam; a children's series of live episodes shown on Spanish TV in which Naschy was to play various monsters; his heart attack on August 27, 1991, forced him to break his contract after appearing in only three episodes.
- State of Mind (1992), a Belgian/French/Dutch co-production directed by Reginald Adamson (produced by Sydney Ling); this was a violent crime drama co-starring Fred Williamson (as a cop hunting a serial killer) and Naschy in what amounts to a cameo appearance as a prison warden who gets murdered in a shower scene; the film took more than seven years to get distributed just in Spain; Troma Films has since released the film on DVD in the U.S.
- La Casa De Alba (1992) a Spanish/Japanese co-production of which little is known; it was a documentary format, 13-episode TV series shown only in Japan. Naschy's involvement was as a production manager.
- El angel mas caido/ The Most Fallen Angel (1993) a short directed by Ivan Bousas; Naschy only acted in it
- La Noche del Ejecutor (The Night of the Executioner) (1993), a very low budget, gruesome vigilante movie written and directed by Paul Naschy, very similar to Death Wish (1974); Naschy's son Sergio Molina had a small role; the film went direct to video in Spain only (never released theatrically anywhere). It was released on blu-ray by Mondo Macabro.
- El Necrofago, 1994, a short directed by Gonzalo J. Fuentes (never released in the U.S.)
- Los Resucitados (The Resurrected) (1995), an unfinished project which Naschy starred in, based on a story by Gustavo Adolfo Becquer; the film's post-production was only completed 24 years later, and it was released on DVD (in Spain only) in 2019 by a company called "Red Rum".
- Hambre Mortal (Mortal Hunger) (1996) a short satirical homage written and directed by Toni Escalonilla; Naschy played a character called Uncle Carlos (never released in the U.S.)
- La mala estrella / The Bad Star (1996) a short directed by Jose Maria Gonzalez andJose Carlos Ruiz; Naschy just acted in it
- Licántropo: El Asesino de la Luna Llena (Lycantropus: The Full Moon Murderer) (1996) a.k.a. Lycantropus: The Moonlight Murders; directed by Francisco Gordillo; this was the 11th film in the "Hombre Lobo" series; shown theatrically only in Spain in April 1997; available in the U.S. on DVD in English language.
- Cientificamente Perfectos (Scientifically Perfect) (1996), a minor sci-fi/special effects film directed by a woman named Francesc X. Capell; Naschy has a small role as a police commissioner; screened at the San Sebastian Film Festival in 1996; theatrically released only in Spain in 1997 (never released in the U.S.)
- El Ojo de la Medusa (The Eye of the Medusa) 1997, a crime drama directed by Jose Cabanach; Naschy plays a vicious gangster who sleeps with a police detective's wife; the two men settle their differences with a game of Russian Roulette; (this film was apparently never completed, as it has never been released theatrically anywhere).
- Quando el Mundo se Acabe te Seguire Amando (I'll Still Love You When the World Ends) 1998; a romantic drama directed by Pilar Sueiro; Naschy played a character called Hugo (never released in the U.S.)
- Querido Maestro (1998), Naschy played a gym teacher in 11 episodes of this Spanish TV series (never released in the U.S.).
- Rondadores Nocturno 2 (1999), a short co-written by Naschy, in which he played "the Redeemer's Spirit" (never released in the U.S.).
- Erase Otra Vez (Once Upon A Time Again) a.k.a. Once Upon Another Time (2000), a Spanish Dogma film written and directed by Juan Pinzas; Naschy played a gardener (never released in the U.S.).
- La Gran Vida (2000) a.k.a. Living It Up; a big budget Salma Hayek comedy directed by Antonio Cuadri; Naschy has a small role as a cab driver; released direct to DVD by Columbia Tri-Star.
- Animas/ Souls (2000) a short directed by Danie Ortiz-Entrambasaguas; Naschy played a character called Fernando Luciano
- Antivicio (2000), a Spanish TV show; Naschy played a police official in only one episode, directed by Manuel Estudillo
- El Comisario (2000), a Spanish TV show; Naschy played an internal affairs officer in only one episode, directed by Jose Paino
- School Killer (2001), a horror film directed by Carlos Gil; Naschy plays a major role (a killer who returns from the grave to murder teenagers); never dubbed in English; released on DVD by Image Entertainment in Spanish/subtitled only as School Killer.
- Octavia (2002), a drama directed by Basilio Patino; Naschy plays a small role as a police inspector; the film was shown at the San Sebastian International Film Festival in 2002, and then released theatrically in Spain only (never released in the U.S.)
- Mucha Sangre (2002), an adult sci-fi/comedy directed by Pepe de las Heras; Naschy plays an eccentric gangster named Mr. Vicuna who is actually an alien invader from space; the film is over the top in the gore and sex department; released only on a German DVD subtitled from Splendid Entertainment.
- El Lado Oscuro (The Dark Side) 2002, directed by Luciano Berriatua; Naschy played 4 different roles in this film including Dr. Van Helsing, Jesus Christ, Paracelsus and a cult leader; it was shown once at a Spanish film festival in November 2002 and then completely disappeared; (never released anywhere, theatrically or on DVD).
- El quinto rincon/ The Fifth Corner (2002), a short in which Naschy plays a boxing coach; based on a story by Jesus M. Balmaseda (never released in the U.S.)
- El Corazon Delator (The Tell-Tale Heart) 2003, a 10-minute short horror film written and directed by Alfonso Suarez, based on the famous Edgar Allan Poe story; Naschy played the lunatic (never released in the U.S.)
- Countess Dracula's Orgy of Blood (2003), directed in Hollywood by Don Glut, this adult sex-and-horror film was shot back-to-back with Fred Olen Ray's Tomb of the Werewolf in 2003; Naschy played a Spanish priest named Father Jacinto, speaking all of his lines in Spanish (subtitled); filmed on video; released direct to DVD in 2004 by Retromedia/Image.
- Tomb of the Werewolf (a.k.a. The Unliving) (2003), a sleazy adult horror film directed in Hollywood by Fred Olen Ray, co-starring Michelle Bauer; Naschy's final appearance as Waldemar Daninsky, speaking his lines phonetically in stilted English; filmed on video; released direct to DVD in 2004 (as Tomb of the Werewolf) and re-released in a director's cut in 2015 by Retromedia/Image as The Unliving (with added commentary tracks).
- Rojo Sangre (Blood Red) filmed in August 2003; directed by Christian Molina (no relation); Naschy plays an aging ex-horror film actor in this violent horror thriller; shown theatrically only in Spain in April 2004, and screened at the 2005 Fantasporto Festival in Portugal; released in the U.S. directly to DVD by Media Blasters/Fangoria in 2005.
- Rottweiler (2004), sci-fi horror film directed by Brian Yuzna in Spain; Naschy plays the villain but he's only in the film for a few scenes; it premiered at a Spanish film festival in December 2004; shown theatrically only in Spain in June 2005; available on DVD from Lionsgate (in Spanish language only).
- Um Lobisomem na Amazonia (A Werewolf in the Amazon) (2005), a.k.a. Amazonia Misteriosa; a sexy horror/comedy directed in Rio de Janeiro by Ivan Cardoso; story loosely based on H. G. Wells' novel The Island of Dr. Moreau; the film premiered at the Rio de Janeiro Film Festival in September 2005; later released direct to DVD in 2015 by Camp Motion Pictures.
- El Perdon/ The Pardon (2006), a short written and directed by Angel Gomez Hernandez that starred both Naschy and his old director friend Carlos Aured; Naschy and Aured had had a falling out back in 1973, and only patched up their relationship when they co-starred in this short film 33 years later (never released in the U.S.).
- The Vampyre by John W. Polidori (2007) a short directed by Alejandro Ballesteros and Antonio Curdado, in which Naschy played Lord Ruthven (never released in the U.S.).
- La duodécima hora (The Twelfth Hour) (2007), directed by Juanma Ruiz and Rodrigo Plaza; a faux-documentary about a hidden mystery involved in the filming of F. W. Murnau's Nosferatu; Naschy is briefly interviewed among others; it was shown only at limited film festival screenings in Spain and South America; this film is today available only on the Internet.
- Lagrimas de papel / Paper Tears (2008) short film written and directed by Angel Gomez Hernandez; Naschy played a character named Pablo

=== Posthumously released projects ===
Naschy died on November 30, 2009, in Madrid, Spain.

- Empusa (filmed in Summer 2007) a vampire film directed in Spain by Paul Naschy (shot entirely on video); film was to be co-written and co-directed by Paul Naschy and Carlos Aured, but Aured dropped out of the project midway through and Naschy finished shooting the film; Naschy's original screenplay title was Gaviotas (Seagulls) but producer Angel Mora changed it to Empusa later on; Antonio Mayans co-starred and co-produced the film; Naschy died in 2009 before the film was completed and producer Mora finished the post-production work himself; the film was first shown at the Sitges Film Festival in 2010, posthumously; it was only released theatrically (in Spain) in October 2014; released on DVD (in Spanish/ subtitled) from Tema in Spain (Region 2 only)
- La Herencia Valdemar (The Valdemar Legacy) filmed in 2009; directed in Spain by Jose Luis Aleman, based on the works of H.P. Lovecraft; Naschy plays Jervas, the family retainer in this film; released theatrically in Spain only in January 2010 posthumously.
- La Herencia Valdemar 2: La Sombra Prohibida (The Valdemar Legacy 2: The Forbidden Shadow) filmed in 2009; directed in Spain by Jose Luis Aleman (who died soon after finishing the film); Naschy doesn't appear that much (as Jervas) in Part Two (the bulk of his scenes are in Part One); first shown at the Sitges Film Festival in October 2010; released theatrically in Spain only in January 2011; Sony later released both of the Valdemar films together in a Blu-ray set as a double feature in Spain only.
- The Great Croton/ Croton el Grande (filmed in 2009) directed by Luis Colombo; scripted by Naschy, but he died before he was able to star in it, so Damian Varea played "Croton"; co-starred Antonio Mayans (who was also the film's production manager) and Luis Colombo (who was also the cinematographer); shown only at Spanish film festivals in 2011, posthumously.
- O Apóstolo/ The Apostle (filmed in 2009) an animated film in which Naschy did the voice of a character (the Archbishop); premiered at the Malaga Film Festival in April 2012 posthumously, then was released theatrically (briefly) in Spain in October 2012; it went on to win several festival prizes afterward.
- The Man Who Saw Frankentein Cry (2010) Posthumously-released documentary on Paul Naschy's life and career.
- Culto al terror (2017) Argentinian-made documentary by Gustavo Mendoza about the horror film convention circuit; interviews celebrities such as Naschy, Robert Englund, Barbara Crampton, Dario Argento and others.

== Bibliography ==
- Publisher of the "Muchas Gracias, Senor Lobo" hardcover
- Naschy, Paul (2000). Paul Naschy: Memoirs of a Wolfman. Midnight Marquee Press. ISBN 1-887664-38-6.
- Tapes From the Attic: Paul Naschy; Video Watchdog Volume #66 (December 2000) Tim Lucas, Shane M. Dallmann, and Richard Harland Smith.
