= Panic Beats =

Latidos de Panico
- DVD cover art
- Directed by: Paul Naschy
- Written by: Paul Naschy
- Produced by: Augusto Boue; Julia Saly
- Starring: Paul Naschy; Julia Saly; Lola Gaos; Frances Ondiviela; Silvia Miro
- Cinematography: Julio Burgos
- Edited by: Roberto Fandiño
- Music by: Moncho Alpuente; Servando Carballar
- Release date: May 1983 (Spain)
- Running time: 92 minutes
- Countries: Spain; Japan
- Language: Spanish

Panic Beats (Spanish: Latidos de Pánico) is a 1983 film starring Paul Naschy and Julia Saly. The film was a Spanish-Japanese co-production made as a sequel to Naschy's 1972 Horror Rises From the Tomb (featuring the return of his "Alaric de Marnac" character from the previous film). It was produced by Augusto Boue and Julia Saly for Naschy's company Aconito Films. Paul Naschy plays the monstrous Alaric de Marnac and Julia Saly, Lola Gaos, and Silvia Miro co-star. Some stock music written by Roberto Nicolosi for 1959's Caltiki the Immortal Monster can be heard in the background.

Fernando Florido handled the gore and special effects. The film features a number of scenes involving full frontal female nudity. The old mansion Naschy used in the film was actually one of Generalisimo Francisco Franco's former homes, and in between takes, Naschy roamed the house and enjoyed rummaging through the various furnishings and paraphernalia that was left to rot in the house after Franco's death in 1975.

== Plot ==
Paul Marnac plots to get rid of his wealthy wife Genevieve (who has a weak heart) by frightening her to death. He brings her to stay for a few months at his parents' old mansion in the country, telling her the peace and serenity will improve her heart condition. Meanwhile he is scaring her with legends of his 15th century ancestor, an evil murderous knight named Alaric de Marnac, making her think the monster still inhabits the house. Paul is having an affair with Julie, his young maid, and plans to marry her after his wife is out of the way. Paul even goes so far as to disguise himself as Alaric, wearing a 15th century suit of armor, and succeeds in scaring the poor woman to death. But the joke is on Paul, because after getting Paul to marry her, Julie electrocutes him in the bathtub. Thinking her plan has succeeded, Julie prepares to celebrate her ill-gotten gains, but then realizes that the legends of Alaric were true. The centuries-old monster appears in the house and wreaks a gory vengeance on Julie.

== Cast ==
- Paul Naschy as Paul Marnac
- Julia Saly as Genevieve
- Lola Gaos as Mobile
- Silvia Miró as Mireille
- Frances Ondiviela as Julie
- Manuel Zarzo as Dr. Lacombe
- José Vivó as Dr. Rigaud
- José Sacristán as Alain
- Salvador Sáinz as Catholic priest
- Charly Bravo
- Hector Cantolla
- Carol Kirkham

== Release ==
The film was only released in Spain in May 1983, more than a year after it was completed. It was never dubbed in English nor was it shown theatrically outside of Spain. The film was however screened at the Brussels International Film Festival in November 1983, along with Naschy's other 1983 film The Beast and the Magic Sword, and Naschy was given a prize there in recognition of his body of work in the cinefantastique genre.

Panic Beats was later released direct to VHS in the U.S.

Panic Beats was released on DVD in subtitled format by Mondo Macabro on 26 April 2005.

A Blu-ray version of the film came out on 9 March 2021 containing 4K transfer, LPCM 2.0 in Spanish with English subtitles.
