= La Maldicion de la Bestia =

- Spanish theatrical release poster
- Directed by: Miguel Iglesias Bonns
- Written by: Paul Naschy (as Jacinto Molina)
- Produced by: Profilmes; Modesto Pérez Redondo; Jose Antonio Perez Giner
- Starring: Paul Naschy; Grace Mills; Silvia Solar; Luis Induni
- Cinematography: Tomàs Pladevall
- Edited by: Carmen Fábregas
- Distributed by: Independent International Pictures (USA, theatrical), Mariano Sanz Sanz (Spain)
- Release dates: December 1975 (Spain); 1977 (U.S.)
- Running time: 94 minutes
- Country: Spain
- Language: Spanish

La Maldicion de la Bestia (The Curse of the Beast) is a 1975 Spanish horror film that is the eighth in a long series about the werewolf Count Waldemar Daninsky, played by Paul Naschy. The film has also been known as The Werewolf and the Yeti, Night of the Howling Beast and Hall of the Mountain King. This film ignored the events from the earlier Hombre Lobo films and provided an all-new origin for Waldemar's lycanthropy, having the curse transmitted to Waldemar by the bites of two female werewolves. A yeti is woven into the storyline (as in The Fury of the Wolfman), but in this film the Yeti is not the direct cause of Waldemar's lycanthropy. Fernando Florido and Adolfo Ponte handled the special effects throughout the film.

Naschy followed up this film with a 1980 sequel called El Retorno del Hombre Lobo/Return of the Wolf Man.

== Plot ==
Waldemar Daninsky goes to Tibet as a guide for an expedition led by Professor Lacombe to look for proof that the yeti exists. Waldemar gets separated from the main party and captured by two cannibalistic werewolf women in an ice cave, who transform him into a werewolf by biting him. Waldemar's companions are kidnapped by a band of Tibetan pirates who torture their victims gruesomely. In the film's grand climax, Waldemar (in werewolf form) gets to fight not only Sekkar Khan, the bandits' leader, but also a genuine Yeti in bloody hand-to-fang combat. Waldemar kills the Yeti by biting his throat out, but in the process, he is gravely wounded. The professor's daughter, Sylvia, who is in love with Waldemar, manages to cure him of his lycanthropy by rubbing a small Tibetan flower mixed with her blood on him. In the end, Waldemar becomes a man and goes off into the sunset with Sylvia, making this the only Waldemar Daninsky film to have a happy ending.

== Cast ==
- Paul Naschy as Waldemar Daninsky
- Mercedes Molina as Sylvia Lacombe
- Silvia Solar as Wandessa
- Gil Vidal as Larry Talbot
- Josep Castillo Escalona as Professor Lacombe
- Luis Induni as Sekkar Khan
- Ventura Oller as Ralph
- Veronica Miriel as Melody
- Juan Velilla as Norman
- Jose Luis Chinchilla as Temugin
- Ana Maria Mauri as Princess Ulka
- Carmen Cervera
- Juan Olle
- Fernando Ulloa as Lama
- Gaspar "Indio" Gonzalez as Tigre
- Pepa Ferrer as Yanika
- Victor Israel as Joel
- Eduardo Alcazar

== Release ==
The film premiered at the Sitges International Film Festival in Spain in October 1975, where Naschy was awarded Best Actor for his role in the film. The film was first released theatrically in Spain in December 1975 as La maldicion de la bestia. It was shown in France as Dans Les Griffes du Loup Garou / In the Claws of the Loup Garou, and in Belgium as Loup Garou: The Werewolf.

An English-dubbed international version was created and titled The Werewolf and the Yeti. But when the film was finally theatrically released in the U.S. in 1977 in 1977 by Independent-International Pictures, it was shown instead as Night of the Howling Beast. It was years later released on DVD as The Werewolf and the Yeti

This film involved more nudity and graphic gore than most of Naschy's other Wolfman films and, as a result, was never theatrically shown in the U.K. The film was banned by the BBFC under the Video Recordings Act of 1984 and was featured on the "video nasties" list. It was released as a "pre-cert" video tape in the UK.

The film was released on VHS Home Video in the 1980s under three different titles... Hall of the Mountain King (severely edited), Night of the Howling Beast and The Werewolf and the Yeti.

The film has been released on DVD in its native Spain by Tripictures. It was also released on Blu-ray Disc in the US in 2017 by Shout Factory as part of their 5-movie collection The Paul Naschy Collection II, under the title The Werewolf and the Yeti.
