= Boné's Rebellion =

1844 uprising in Spain

- The execution of Panteleon Boné and his accomplices at Alicante on 8 March 1844. (The Illustrated London News, 30 March 1844)
Date	28 January 1844 – 9 March 1844
Location	Alicante, Spain

Belligerents
Progressive Liberals	Moderate Liberal government of Luis González Bravo

Commanders and leaders
Pantaleón Boné	Federico Roncali

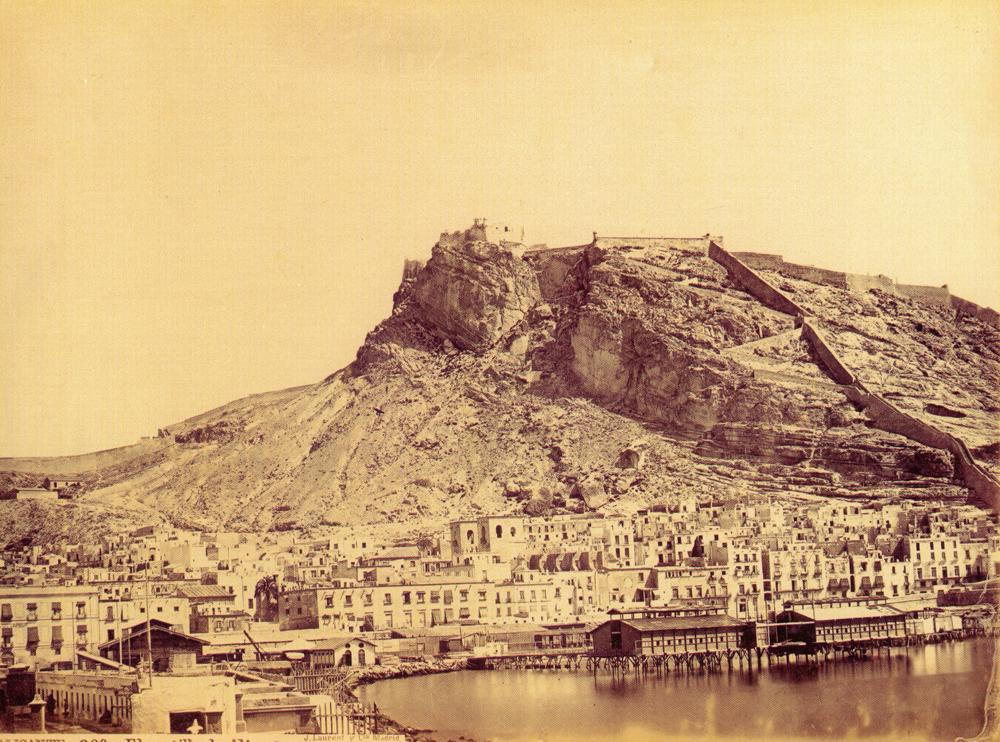
Santa Bárbara Castle served as Pantaleón Boné's main base of operations during the 44-day uprising.

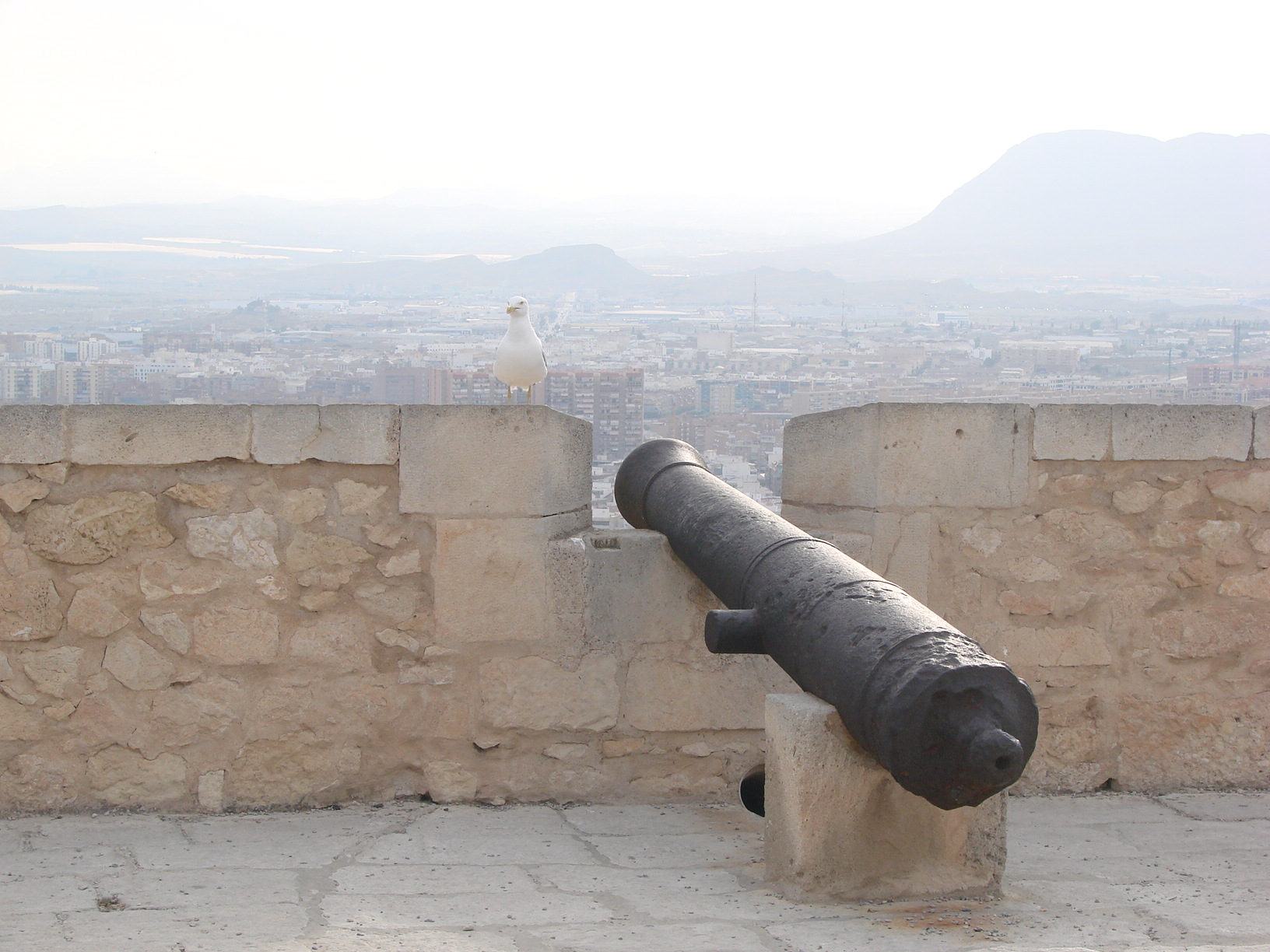
The cannons of Santa Bárbara Castle were fired frequently throughout Boné's Rebellion.

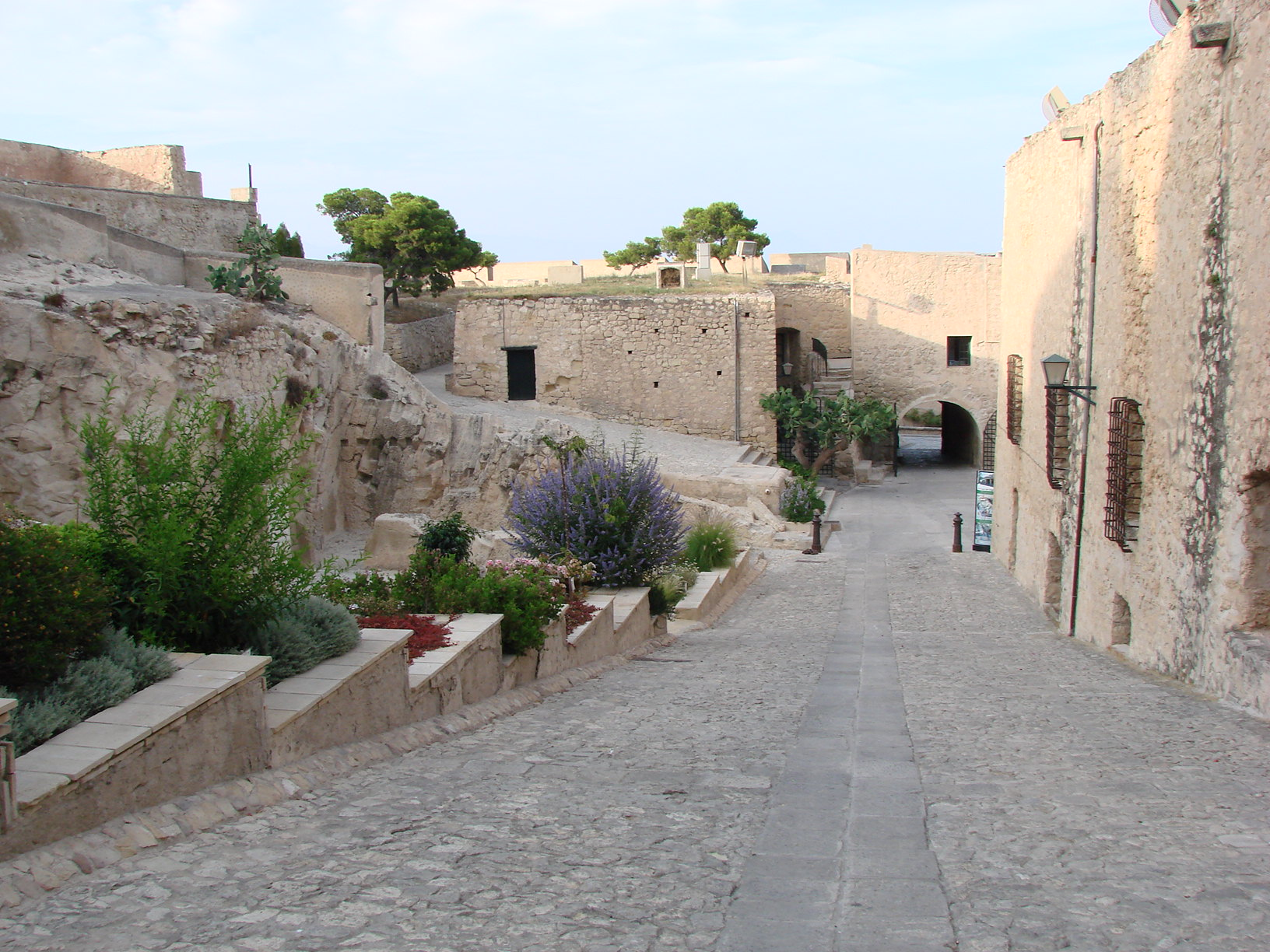
The interior of Santa Bárbara Castle became a settlement for the civilian population and militias under Boné's command.

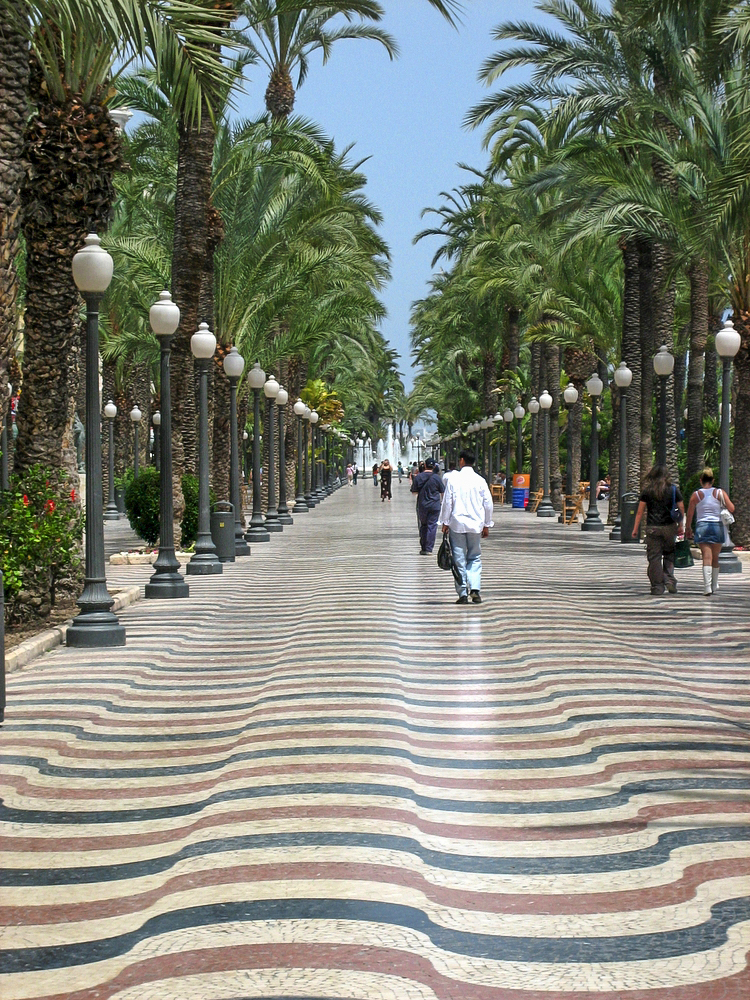
Boné and his troops were executed on the harbor's breakwater (now the Explanada de España) in Alicante.

Boné's Rebellion was an uprising that took place in the city of Alicante, Spain, from 28 January to 9 March 1844 directed against the Moderate Liberal government of Luis González Bravo — an administration formed in late 1843, following the fall of the Espartero Regency in July 1843. Led by Pantaleón Boné, a cavalry colonel and commander of the Carabineros, a border guard force, the rebellion was a popular uprising by Progressive Liberal citizens who demanded a series of political, economic, and social reforms in response to the return of the Moderate Liberals to power.

== Rebellion ==
Pantaleón Boné — a native of Huesca — arrived in Alicante from Valencia accompanied by a Carabineros force composed of 150 infantrymen and 50 cavalrymen *carabineros*, as well as a Spanish Army infantry battalion from the Savoy Regiment. He spent 27 and 28 January securing the support of officers from the city's garrison and Santa Bàrbara Castle, a stronghold he seized on the afternoon of 28 January. Pantaleón's men signaled their capture of the city in two ways: At 17:00, drums sounded a call to arms, and at 18:00 they fired a cannon shot from the Macho del Castillo — the castle's highest esplanade and site of its former keep or upper citadel — followed by a second shot moments later. Simultaneously, the fortress bell rang an alarm to signal that Boné's men had successfully carried out the rebellion in the city.

The Progressive Liberal pronunciamiento (uprising) at Alicante served as a catalyst for the revolt throughout the entire Province of Alicante. The rebels planned was to seize the cities of Albacete, Murcia, Almería, and Málaga — where leaders had already been designated for each area — with Boné remaining as the supreme commander in Alicante. As the days passed, the local population began to suffer the hardships of the conflict, witnessing the destruction of their homes, facing exorbitant costs, and enduring famine. As the city's supreme authority, Boné implemented the conversionof the Church of Santo Domingo into a bakery and demanded food supplies from local merchants to provision those held within Santa Bárbara Castle — a group that included both a large portion of the civilian population and various detainees. He also issued an edict to encourage the recruitment of citizens between the ages of 16 and 50 into his forces, offering them food rations and a payment of three reales each. While recruiting the civilian population, he issued a formal proclamation summoning the city's tailors and shoemakers — imposing a fine of 100 reales on anyone who failed to appear — to repurpose the goods he had seized at the port's customs house (such as fabrics, linen, and cotton cloth) into uniforms, and to use calfskins and bales of shoe leather to manufacture shoes and cartridge pouches.

In the aftermath of Boné's seizure of Alicante, the rebels rounded up and arrested local leaders. Among the notable figures they captured were the chief executive of the municipal government, Primary Mayor (Alcalde primero) Miguel Pascual de Bonanza, and a significant portion of the city council. This included the councilman (regidor) Juan García Álamo and several city syndics (síndicos) — public advocates tasked with defending civic financial and legal interests — including Juan Bonanza, Félix Giménez, Francisco Ansaldo, and Juan Bautista de Bassecourt y Baciero, who held the title of the 4th Count of Santa Clara. The government forces also detained Mauricio Gil, the commander of the local correctional facility (comandante del correccional) who oversaw the city's prison system. Meanwhile, Cipriano Bergé, the civic, legally elected constitutional mayor (alcalde constitucional) whose office represented the Progressive Liberal-backed constitutional system established under the Progressive Party, actively resisted capture and evaded the initial wave of arrests.

Having secured full control of Alicante — a fortified town entirely enclosed by defensive walls — Boné was forced to organize a comprehensive strategy involving troops, funding, food supplies, and weaponry in just a matter of days. He deployed significant reinforcements to Santa Bárbara Castle, the Castle of San Fernando, and the San Carlos bastion. He also made several trips to various points across the province of Alicante in an effort to secure defenses and maintain the morale of his officers and soldiers.

The Captain General of Valencia, Federico Roncali, traveled to the Alicante region, where he established his headquarters in Villafranqueza. Brigadier Juan Antonio Pardo, the Commander General of Murcia, joined Roncali, set up his own headquarters in San Vicente del Raspeig, and placed himself under Roncali's command. Fearing the impending conflict, many families from Alicante fled at the very outset. On 5 February 1844, a violent skirmish took place between Boné's and Pardo's troops in the area between Elda and Petrer. During this engagement, several key figures from Boné's forces were taken prisoner, including Lieutenant Colonel Ildefonso Basilio, Commander José Mena, Captain Luis Gil, Commander Pío Pérez, and Lieutenants Juan Gómez, Luis Molina, and Arcadio Blanco. Beginning on 7 February 1844, Pardo laid siege to the city of Alicante by both land and sea, employing a Spanish Navy ship to bombard the city.

Roncali and Pardo ordered the conscription of all men — bachelors and widowers alike — between the ages of 18 and 50. Following this, Boné took refuge within the walls of the castle of Alicante, prepared to hold out. Gradually, the encirclement tightened in favor of Roncali's and Pardo's troops. As the days passed, the situation in Alicante became untenable. The captain of the Carabineros in command of the garrison at Santa Bárbara Castle, Juan Martín Arranz, nephew of the late Juan Martín Díez, known as "El Empecinado" ("The Stubborn One"), was a close friend of Boné, but he nonetheless negotiated the surrender of the city behind Boné's back, severing communications between the castle and the city. Meanwhile, foreign residents in Alicante sought refuge aboard ships from their respective countries that had arrived to protect them. The Progressive Liberal uprising faltered, and government troops eventually took the city. In his account of Boné's defeat, the historian and journalist Nicasio Camilo Jover wrote of the government soldiers’ arrival: "The townspeople watched the entry of the troops in silence and sorrow."

At dawn on 14 February 1844, seven of Boné's officers — captured during the skirmish near Elda — were executed by firing squad against the wall of the Guijarro family mausoleum in Villafranqueza. Boné and 23 of his companions were executed by firing squad — lined up and shot in the back — on 8 March 1844 at the Malecón (now known as the Explanada de España) in the port of Alicante.

== Commemoration ==
In memory of those executed by firing squad, the Monument to the Martyrs of Liberty, created by sculptor Vicente Bañuls, was erected in Alicante on 8 March 1907. It was located in what is now the Plaza de la Puerta del Mar, at the end of a promenade that had been known since the mid-19th century as the "Paseo de los Mártires" (Promenade of the Martyrs), today's Explanada de España. At the foot of Santa Bárbara Castle, the city also named a street after Boné and another street "Ocho de Marzo" ("Eighth March") for the date of his execution. From 1854 until 1936 a public, civic event took place every year on 8 March in Alicante along the harbor's seawall to commemorate freedoms for which Boné and his supporters fought, while a mass was celebrated simultaneously at the Concatedral de San Nicolás.

Following the Spanish Civil War (1936–1939), the new Francoist regime removed the name Paseo de los Mártires and restored an earlier name, Explanada de España, which previously had been used for a few years for the Canalejas Park. Similarly, the street named after Boné was renamed for the politician José Martínez de Velasco, who was executed by firing squad in 1936 — —a name it still bears today. In the same vein, the street named Ocho de Marzo reverted to its former name, "José Serra Lloret." Furthermore, the Monument to the Martyrs of Liberty — damaged and left headless by bombings during the Spanish Civil War — was dismantled in 1941. All commemorative events likewise suppressed after 1936, causing both the monument and the ideals it represented to fade into oblivion.

The erasure of the memory of the "Martyrs of Freedom" (Mártires de la Libertad) also extended to the district of Villafranqueza — part of the municipality of Alicante — where some of the insurgents whose remains are buried in the district were executed by firing squad against the walls of the Guijarro family mausoleum on 14 February 1844. The street named Calle de los Mártires de la Libertad (Martyrs of Freedom Street) reverted to its former name, Calle del Calvario (Calvary Street). A civic procession in honor of the "Martyrs of Freedom" takes place in Villafranqueza today, moving from the Plaza de la Constitución toward the Guijarro family mausoleum along a path officially named the Paseo de los Mártires de la Libertad (Promenade of the Martyrs of Freedom) which leads to the mausoleum.

In the winter of 2010, the professor and composer Miguel Brotóns captured the historical events of Boné's Rebellion through the musical score of his ode and symphonic poem Mártires de la Libertad ("Martyrs of Freedom").

Housed within the Alicante city hall is a painting by an anonymous artist that depicts the execution by firing squad of Boné and other supporters of the rebellion at the Malecón.
