= Luis Barboo =

Spanish actor

- Born: March 20, 1927; Vigo, Pontevedra
- Died: September 30, 2001 (aged 74); Madrid
- Occupation: Actor
- Years active: 1964-1994

Luis Barboo (20 March 1927 – 30 September 2001) was a Spanish actor.

He played a Baxter gang gunman in A Fistful of Dollars (1964). He played Truto in The Demons (1973), and Caronte in La Maldición de Frankenstein/ The Erotic Rites of Frankenstein (1973), both directed by Jesús Franco.

He played Red Hair in Conan the Barbarian (1982), directed by John Milius and written by Oliver Stone. He appeared in Spanish films like O camiño das estrelas: Galicia (1993), directed by Chano Piñeiro and starring Sabela Páez and Gustavo Salmerón, and Supersonic Man (1979), directed by Juan Piquer Simón.

He died in Madrid in 2001.

== Filmography ==
=== Films ===
- 1964: A Fistful of Dollars as Baxter Gunman #2 (uncredited)
- 1964: Doomed Fort
- 1964: Cavalry Charge as Trapper
- 1965: Assault on Fort Texan as Sub-Lieutenant of Bonnet (uncredited)
- 1965: Place Called Glory City as Gunman (uncredited)
- 1965: Espionage in Tangiers as Henchman
- 1965: Lone and Angry Man as Sbirro
- 1965: Cotolay
- 1966: Kid Rodelo
- 1966: The Sea Pirate
- 1966: Sugar Colt as 'Bingo'
- 1966: The Ugly Ones as Federal Agent Outrider
- 1966: El halcón y la presa as Widow's Ranchero (uncredited)
- 1966: Tormenta sobre el Pacífico
- 1966: The Tough One
- 1967: Clint the Stranger as Farmer (uncredited)
- 1967: I'll Kill Him and Return Alone as MacGregor's Henchman (uncredited)
- 1967: Kitosch, the Man Who Came from the North
- 1967: Gentleman Killer as Ferreres Gang Member (uncredited)
- 1967: Un hombre vino a matar as Silent Wolf (uncredited)
- 1967: God Forgives... I Don't! as Full-Bearded Henchman
- 1968: Killer Goodbye as Townsman (uncredited)
- 1968: Two Brothers, One Death as Finnegan Henchman (uncredited)
- 1968: Go for Broke
- 1968: Operación Mata Hari
- 1968: Llego, veo, disparo as Sergeant (uncredited)
- 1968: Day After Tomorrow as Hud
- 1968: God Was in the West, Too, at One Time as Zed
- 1968: Cuidado con las señoras
- 1968: The Bastard
- 1968: They Came to Rob Las Vegas as Guard (uncredited)
- 1968: Dead Men Don't Count as Anderson (uncredited)
- 1969: Tiempos de Chicago as The Irish
- 1969: América rugiente as Mechanic
- 1969: Hell Commandos as SS Sergeant
- 1969: Alive or Preferably Dead as Cowboy On The Train (uncredited)
- 1969: Taste of Vengeance as Blake, Henchman (uncredited)
- 1969: El ángel'
- 1969: A Bullet for Sandoval
- 1969: The War Devils as Ally Commander
- 1970: Fortunata y Jacinta (uncredited)
- 1970: Robin Hood: the Invincible Archer
- 1970: Arizona Colt Returns as 'Scarface'
- 1970: Cannon for Cordoba (uncredited)
- 1971: The Light at the Edge of the World as Calsa Larga
- 1971: The Case of the Scorpion's Tail as Sharif
- 1971: Doc (uncredited)
- 1971: Hannie Caulder as Sheriff Lee (uncredited)
- 1971: Raise Your Hands, Dead Man, You're Under Arrest as J. Mac
- 1971: Los días de Cabirio as Chófer
- 1972: Antony and Cleopatra as Varrius
- 1972: Dracula, Prisoner of Frankenstein as Morpho
- 1972: The Call of the Wild (uncredited)
- 1972: Les ebranlées
- 1972: El monte de las brujas as Hombre Encadenado
- 1973: The Demons as Truro
- 1973: Female Vampire as Irina's Manservant
- 1973: The Erotic Rites of Frankenstein as Caronte
- 1973: The Loreley's Grasp as Alberic, Loreley's Servant
- 1973: Habla, mudita
- 1973: Three Supermen of the West as Uomo Di Navajo Joe (uncredited)
- 1973: Yankee Dudler as Sheriff Dave
- 1973: Return of the Evil Dead as Executed Templar
- 1973: Me has hecho perder el juicio
- 1973: Lovers of Devil's Island as Lenz
- 1973: El misterio del castillo rojo
- 1974: Fifteen Year Old Captain as Sailor
- 1974: Vacaciones sangrientas
- 1974: ¡Caray, qué palizas! as Joe, The Blacksmith
- 1974: La noche de los asesinos as Rufus
- 1974: Los nuevos españoles
- 1974: Hay que matar a B. as Assailant #1 (uncredited)
- 1975: The Wind and the Lion as Gayaan The Terrible
- 1975: El mejor regalo as Faustino (uncredited)
- 1976: El soldado de fortuna (uncredited)
- 1976: Mayordomo para todo as Lucio (uncredited)
- 1976: Potato Fritz
- 1976: Manuela as 'El Jarapo'
- 1976: Tiempos duros para Drácula as Marido de Celia
- 1976: La muerte ronda a Mónica as Isidro
- 1976: The Second Power as Yajan
- 1977: El hombre que supo amar as Firpo
- 1977: Where Time Began
- 1977: March or Die (uncredited)
- 1977: Del amor y de la muerte
- 1977: A Dog Called... Vengeance
- 1977: Mala racha (TV Movie)
- 1977: Cuentos de las sábanas blancas
- 1978: The Pyjama Girl Case as Viewer of Body In Glass Case (uncredited)
- 1978: China 9, Liberty 37 as Henry
- 1978: Don't Panic as Guarda
- 1978: Red Gold as Faro
- 1978: Avisa a Curro Jiménez
- 1978: Cabo de vara (uncredited)
- 1978: Fantasma en el Oeste
- 1979: Supersonic Man as Harrison
- 1980: Un cero a la izquierda as 'El Rubio'
- 1981: Mystery on Monster Island
- 1981: El retorno del hombre lobo as Bandit
- 1981: Yendo hacia ti as Thompson Henchman (uncredited)
- 1982: Los diablos del mar
- 1982: Corridas de alegría
- 1982: Conan the Barbarian as Red Hair
- 1982: Cristóbal Colón, de oficio... descubridor
- 1982: Chispita y sus gorilas as Estúpido #2
- 1982: Sonata de estío (TV Movie)
- 1983: La hija rebelde
- 1983: California Cowboys as Paco
- 1983: El Cid cabreador as Adiano
- 1984: La zorra y el escorpión as Basilio
- 1985: La hoz y el Martínez
- 1985: Dirty Game in Casablanca as Duke Foreman
- 1985: Bad Medicine as Prisoner
- 1986: El orden cómico
- 1986: Marine Issue as Tough #2
- 1987: The Trouble with Spies as Zapata
- 1987: Los alegres pícaros (uncredited)
- 1988: The Brother from Space
- 1989: Blood and Sand as Old Slaughterer
- 1989: El río que nos lleva as Guardia Civil
- 1989: For Better or For Worse as Customs Official
- 1993: O camiño das estrelas: Galicia (Short)

=== TV Series ===
- 1972: Los paladines
- 1973: The Protectors as Taxi Driver
- 1975: Kara Ben Nemsi Effendi as Kadi Guardian (uncredited)
- 1975: Im Auftrag von Madame as Kapitän
- 1975: Sergeant Berry
- 1976: Los libros
- 1977: Zum kleinen Fisch as Leon
- 1977: Curro Jiménez as Bandolero
- 1978: Novela as Paco 'El Herrero'
- 1979: El extraño señor Duvallier as Delgarini
- 1981: Cervantes
- 1982: Verano azul as Comerciante
- 1983: Las pícaras as Carcelero
- 1984: Teresa de Jesús
- 1989: Pedro I el Cruel
- 1989: Blue Blood as Papa
- 1989: Ocean as Ramiro
- 1990: La forja de un rebelde as Marroquí
- 1992: Crónicas del mal as Gangster del coche
- 1994: Los ladrones van a la oficina
- 1994: Serie negra (final appearance)
