= Dracula, Prisoner of Frankenstein =

- Spanish poster
- Directed by: Jesús Franco
- Screenplay by: Jesús Franco
- Story by: Jesús Franco
- Produced by: Robert de Nesle; Victor de Costa
- Starring: Dennis Price; Howard Vernon; Alberto Dalbés; Luis Barboo
- Cinematography: José Climent
- Music by: Bruno Nicolai
- Production companies: Interfilme Produgées Cinematograficas; Cooperativa Fénix Films; Comptoir Francais du Film Production; Prodif Ets.
- Distributed by: Chamartin Producciones y Distribuciones (Spain); Imperial Films (Portugal); Cocinor (France)
- Release dates: 4 October 1972 (Stiges); 17 October 1972 (France); 18 November 1972 (Spain); 4 March 1974 (Portugal)
- Running time: 85 minutes
- Countries: Spain; Portugal; France; Liechtenstein

Dracula, Prisoner of Frankenstein (Note: Spanish: Drácula contra Frankenstein, lit. 'Dracula versus Frankenstein'; Portuguese: Drácula Prisioneiro de Frankenstein; French: Dracula prisonnier de Frankenstein) is a 1972 horror film directed by Jesús Franco and starring Dennis Price, Howard Vernon, Alberto Dalbés, Carmen Yazalde and Luis Barboo.

The film follows Dr. Rainer von Frankenstein (Price), who successfully captures Count Dracula (Vernon). Along with the Doctor's monster (Fernando Bilbao) the doctor controls the vampire for his own evil ends. The film is a co-production between Spain, Portugal, France and Liechtenstein.

Dracula, Prisoner of Frankenstein premiered at the Sitges Film Festival in 1972. The film received a mediocre review in La Vanguardia, which praised the cinematography while finding that it interfered with the narrative of the film. It received more generally negative reviews from Variety, L'Écran fantastique and El Mundo Deportivo.

== Plot ==
Dr. Jonathan Seward tracks Dracula to his castle, and kills him by staking him in the heart. The death causes the vampire's remains to transform into a bat. Some time later, Dr. Rainer von Frankenstein, his mute assistant Morpho, and his Monster arrive at the castle. The doctor plans to revive Dracula, so he can use him to conquer the world.

Dr. Frankenstein revives his monster from stasis, then uses him to kidnap a cabaret singer. He uses her blood to revive Dracula and bring him under his control. Seward realizes his nemesis has returned when one of his patients is bitten and turned into a vampire.

With the help of the local gypsies and a wolfman, Seward raids the castle. Realizing his plan has failed, Dr. Frankenstein destroys the vampires and his Monster, fleeing the castle before Seward can catch him.

== Cast ==
Cast adapted from Murderous Passions: The Delirious Cinema of Jesús Franco.

- Dennis Price as Dr. Rainer von Frankenstein
- Howard Vernon as Dracula
- Paca Gabaldón as María (credited as Mary Francis)
- Alberto Dalbés as Dr. Jonathan Seward
- Carmen Yazalde as female vampire (as Britt Nichols)
- Geneviève Robert as Amira, the gypsy girl
- Josianne Piertte Belair as Estela, a cabaret singer (as Josyane Gilbert)
- Luis Barboo as Morpho
- Brandy as The Wolfman
- Fernando Bilbao as The Monster
- Eduarda Pimenta as married female victim

== Production ==
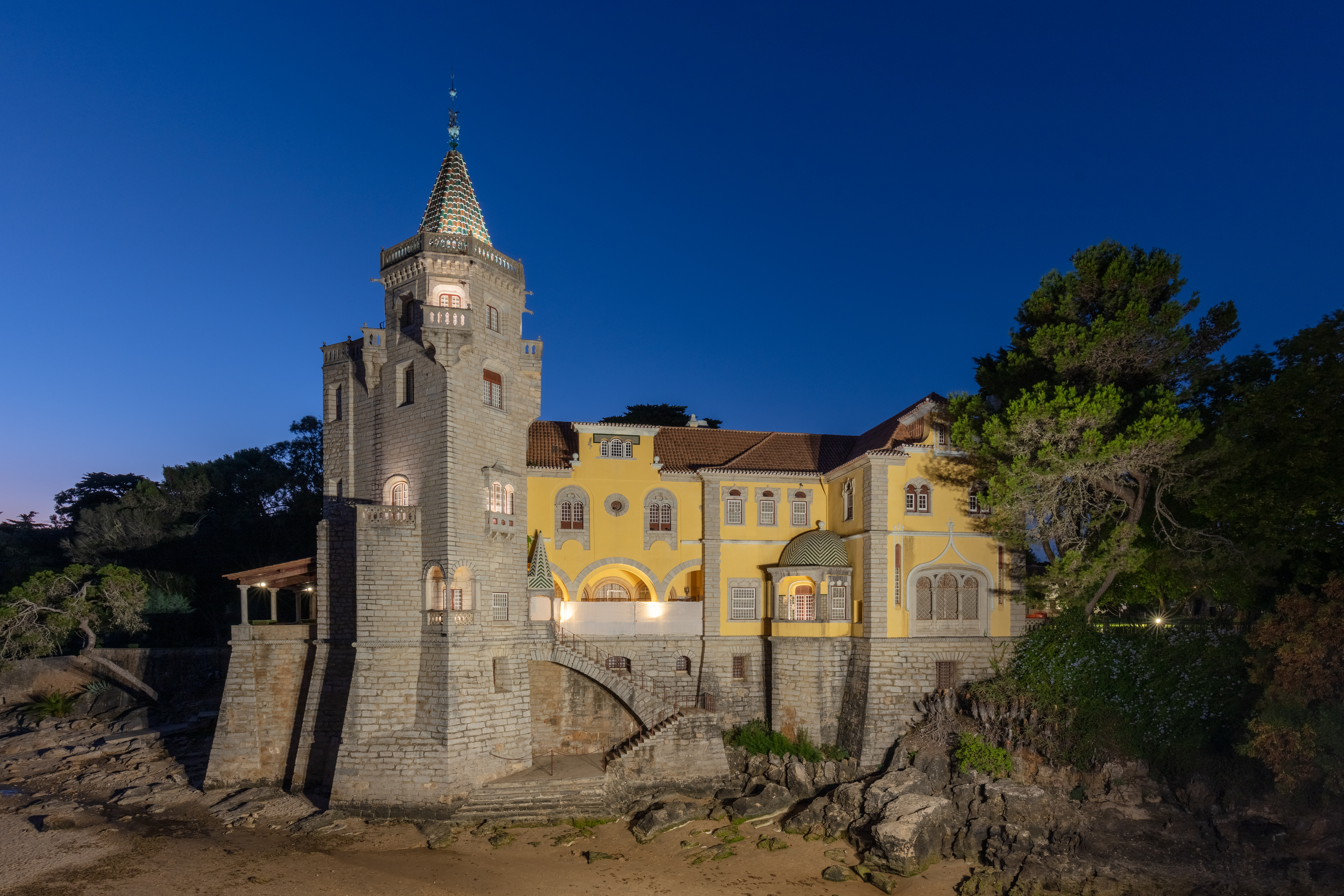
Dracula, Prisoner of Frankenstein was partially shot at the Palácio dos Condes de Castro Guimarães in Cascais, Portugal.

Dracula, Prisoner of Frankenstein was shot in November 1971, with location shooting at the Santa Bárbara Castle in Alicante and the Palácio dos Condes de Castro Guimarães in Cascais, Portugal. The film is a production between Spain, Portugal, France, and Liechtenstein, through Cooperativa Fénix Films based in Madrid, Interfilme Produgées Cinematograficas based in Lisbon, Comptoir Francais du Film Production based in Paris, and Prodif Ets. based in Vaduz.

The film is almost entirely devoid of dialogue. He would make films later in his career which also lacked dialogue with El miron y la exhibicionista (1985), Vampire Blues (1998), and La cripta de las condemnadas (2007).

Most of the score of the film by Bruno Nicolai is drawn from Marquis de Sade: Justine (1969) and Count Dracula (1970). While Daniel White is credited in some versions of the film, Franco biographer Stephen Thrower stated that White had "little if any involvement." Some sources credit White with playing the role of Danny, the innkeeper.

Precise details of the film shoot are unclear, with a press article from December 1971 stating that shooting in Alicante had concluded, while a press article about Paca Gabaldón dated January 1972 described it as her more recent film. Thrower stated that with these details, it was likely shooting was done during the production of A Virgin Among the Living Dead and Jungfrauen-report.

Concurrently with the original shoot, a version with more nudity was created and screened at the 1972 Cannes Film Market.

== Release ==
Dracula, Prisoner of Frankenstein was screened at the Sitges Film Festival on October 4, 1972. This was followed by screenings in Spain in Bilbao on November 18, 1972 and Madrid on January 3, 1973. This was followed by screenings in France in and Belgium in 1972 and 1973 respectively, and later in Turin in 1974 and Portugal on March 4, 1974.

The film was released on blu-ray by Severin Films in January 2024 as Dracula, Prisoner of Frankenstein. The release was scanned from Spanish, French and German release prints to create the longest and most comprehensive version known.

== Reception ==
From contemporary reviews in Spain, a review in La Vanguardia said the film would be entertaining to audiences, stating that the plot was confusing and "delirious" which would make audiences either react in fear or laughter. El Mundo Deportivo praised the cinematography, while stating that the plot lacks originality, and the focus on the quality photography made the plot lose its rhythm. The Canadian newspaper L'Action found the film lacked subtlety and the end result was more grotesque than horrific and that Dennis Price was unconvincing in the role of Dr. Frankenstein.

Following the premiere at the Sitges Film Festival, a review in Variety pronounced the film full of cliches and was bewildered by the uncertain historical setting of it. French genre film magazine L'Écran fantastique said Franco's reverence to the Universal horror films of the 1940s never resulted in anything more than mimicry, and that picture was "a waste of film".

Dennis Price would reprise his role as Dr. Frankenstein in Franco's The Erotic Rites of Frankenstein (1973).

== See also ==
- Dennis Price filmography

== Notes ==
=== Sources ===
- "Dracula prisonnier de Frankenstein". L'Action (in French). Canada. November 4, 1972. p. 15 – via Google News Archive.
- A.M.T. (August 21, 1973). "Musica, teatro y cinematografia" (PDF). La Vanguardia (in Spanish). Vol. 33, no. 344. Barcelona. p. 44. Archived from the original (PDF) on September 4, 2024.
- Cesari, Francesco; Curti, Roberto (2024). The Films of Jesus Franco, 1953-1966. McFarland & Company. ISBN 978-1-4766-9431-3.
- Squires, John (January 16, 2024). "Severin's January Lineup Includes 'Burial Ground' 4K Ultra HD Debut, an Australian Slasher Gem & More!". Bloody Disgusting. Archived from the original on January 16, 2024.
- Thrower, Stephen (2015). Murderous Passions: The Delirious Cinema of Jesús Franco: Volume 1:1959-1974. Strange Attractor Press. ISBN 978-1-907222-31-3.
