= The Demons (1973 film) =

- Directed by: Jesús Franco
- Written by: Jesús Franco
- Based on: Las monjas de Clichy by David Khunne
- Cinematography: Raúl Artigot
- Edited by: Roberto Fandiño
- Production companies: Fénix Films; Marte Films; Comptoir Frangais du Film Production; Interfilme Producgées Cinematograficas, Lda
- Distributed by: Comptoir Frangais du Film Production
- Release date: January 18, 1973 (France)
- Running time: 101 minutes
- Countries: Spain; France; Portugal

The Demons (Les Demons) is a 1973 horror film directed by Jesús Franco. The film is set after a witch trial, the accused witch claims her daughters will avenge her one day. The film was a co-production between Spain, France and Portugal and predominantly filmed in the latter country.

== Cast ==
- Anne Libert as Kathleen
- Britt Nichols as Margaret
- Doris Thomas as mère Rosalinda
- Karin Field as Lady De Winter
- Cihangir Ghaffari as Lord Justice Jeffries (credited as John Foster)
- Luis Barboo as Truro
- Howard Vernon as Lord Malcolm De Winter
- Alberto Dalbes as Thomas Renfield
- Andres Monales as Brian de Cassis

== Production ==
The Demons was a Spanish, French and Portuguese co-production. It was created by the Madrid-based companies Fénix Films and Marte Films, the Parisian Comptoir Frangais du Film Production and the Lisbon-based Interfilme Producgées Cinematograficas. While Robert Firsching of AllMovie suggested the film was in response to Ken Russell's The Devils (1971), Stephen Thrower, author of Murderous Passions: The Delirious Cinema of Jesús Franco (2015), said it was more of a "re-tooling" of Franco's earlier film The Bloody Judge (1970).

Thrower said the film was likely shot in early May 1972, following the completion of Franco's The Erotic Rites of Frankenstein as both films share numerous shooting locations. The film was shot in Santa Bàrbara Castle in Alicante and the Castle of Guimarães in Cascais, and in Sintra, Portugal.

Director Jesús Franco did not have a hand in choosing the music for The Demons, with the selections being made by sound editor and future director of French erotic films Gérard Kikoïne.

== Release ==
The Demons was released in France on January 18, 1973, where it was distributed by Comptoir Frangais du Film Production as Les Demons. It had no theatrical distribution in Spain or Portugal.

Redemption released the film on DVD on May 26, 2008. This was followed by Kino Lorber releasing the film on Blu-ray in 2014. The 2014 Blu-ray release is the longest available variant of the film, running at 113 minutes. It was added to Kino's streaming platform Kino Cult in late 2021.

== Reception ==
From retrospective reviews, Firsching complimented some of the actors, saying that Luis Barboo was "suitably nasty" and Doris Thomas "acquits herself quite well". Firsching critiqued Raúl Artigot's cinematography, finding it "replete with alarmingly frequent zooms" and that it was "frequently criticized".

Thrower found it to be a "fast-paced and eventful" film with a lot of Portuguese settings being well utilized. He ultimately recommended it for fans of Euro-horror, as it avoided the languor that could alienate new audiences to Franco.

== See also ==
- List of French films of 1973
- List of horror films of 1973
- List of Spanish films of 1973
