= Yellow Hair and the Fortress of Gold =

1984 Spanish comedy adventure film

- Directed by: Matt Cimber
- Screenplay by: Mitt Cimber; John Kershaw
- Story by: Mitt Cimber
- Produced by: Cihangir Gaffari; Diego Gómez Sempere; Ken Roberson; José Truchado
- Starring: Laurene Landon; Ken Roberson
- Cinematography: John Cabrera
- Edited by: Claudio M. Cutry
- Music by: Franco Piersanti
- Production companies: CineStar Productions; STAC
- Distributed by: Crown International Pictures
- Release date: 18 May 1984
- Running time: 102 minutes
- Country: Spain
- Language: English

Yellow Hair and the Fortress of Gold is a 1984 Spanish western comedy adventure film directed by Matt Cimber and starring Laurene Landon, Cihangir Gaffari and Claudia Gravy. It is also known the alternative title Yellow Hair and the Pecos Kid.

The film was shot on location in Almería, particularly in the Tabernas Desert which often featured in European made westerns. It was made in English and distributed in the United States by Crown International Pictures, a specialist in low-budget action films. It was marketed as being a female version of Indiana Jones, although it more closely resembled a 1940s-style Western serial which its opening credits referenced. Cimber had previously directed Landon in Hundra the year before.

== Synopsis ==
A blonde-haired half Apache woman known as Yellow Hair searches in Mexico for a missing temple filled with gold with assistance of her easy-going sidekick the Pecos Kid. They have to face both Colonel Torres of the Mexican Army, also searching for the gold, and the tribe of Indians who are guarding it.

== Main cast ==
- Laurene Landon as Yellow Hair
- Ken Roberson as Pecos Kid
- Cihangir Gaffari as Shayowteewah
- Luis Lorenzo as Colonel Torres
- Claudia Gravy as Grey Cloud
- Aldo Sambrell as Flores
- Eduardo Fajardo as Man-Who-Knows
- Ramiro Oliveros as Tortuga
- Suzannah Woodside as Rainbow
- Concha Márquez Piquer as Gambling Woman
- Antonio Tarruella as Gambling Man

== Bibliography ==
- Budnik, Daniel R. '80s Action Movies on the Cheap: 284 Low Budget, High Impact Pictures. McFarland, 2017.
