= Cihangir Ghaffari =

Iranian actor and producer (born 1940)

- جهانگیر غفاری
- Born: 9 September 1940 (age 85); Baku, Azerbaijan SSR
- Other names: John Ghaffari; John Foster
- Occupations: Actor; film producer
- Years active: 1965–1990s

Cihangir Ghaffari (Persian: جهانگیر غفاری; born 9 September 1940), also credited as John Ghaffari or John Foster, is an Azerbaijani-born Iranian actor and film producer with an international career.

== Life and career ==
Originally from Baku, Ghaffari began his screen acting career in Imperial Iran in the 1960s. Beginning in the 1970s, he became a star of Turkish cinema. His popularity there led him to integrate the cast of international productions, such as Shaft vuelve a Harlem (1972) by Gordon Parks, Les démons (1973) by Jesús Franco, The Witches Mountain (1974) by Raúl Artigot, Dick Turpin (1974) by Fernando Merino, and Hundra (1983) by Matt Cimber.

He also served as a producer on titles such as Hundra (1983), Yellow Hair and the Fortress of Gold (1984) and La cruz de Iberia (1990). In 1975, he had a small appearance on the American television series Medical Center. In the early 1990s, Ghaffari retired from the film scene.

== Filmography ==
Year	Film	Role(s)	Language	Notes
1965	Mootalaie shahre ma		Persian	
1965	Qahremane qahremanan		Persian	
1966	Emrooz va farda		Persian	
1967	Dalahoo		Persian	
1968	Se javanmard		Persian	
1968	Dozde-siyahpoush		Persian	
1968	Ghoroube botparastan		Persian	
1968	Janjal-e pool		Persian	
1968	Majeraye shabe janveye		Persian	
1968	Mard-e-hanjare-talael		Persian	
1968	Farjam		Persian	Unfinished film;
1968	Tahran Macerası	Cafer	Turkish, Persian	Bilingual film
1969	Back Long Ago		Spanish	Argentinian film; Unreleased
1969	Ghatelin ham migeryand		Persian	
1969	Mojeze-ye ghalbha		Persian	
1969	Shar-ashoob		Persian	
1969	Tatilat-e Dash Esmal		Persian	
1969	Melikşah		Turkish, Persian	Bilingual film
1969	Alemya		Arabic, Persian	Bilingual film
1970	Dokhtar-e zalem-bala		Persian	
1970	Shahr-e hert	Parviz	Persian	
1970	Yahgoot-e se cheshm		Persian	
1970	Javani ham alamai darad		Persian	
1970	Fadime	Faruk	Turkish, Persian	Bilingual film
1970	İşportacı Kız	Cafer	Turkish, Persian	Bilingual film
1970	Malkoçoğlu Cem Sultan	Cem Sultan	Turkish, Persian	Bilingual film
1970	Selahattin Eyyubi	Şövalye Leopold	Turkish, Persian	Bilingual film
1970	Ölüm Fermanı / Se delavar	Logan	Turkish, Persian	Bilingual film
1970	Mive-ye gonah / Hak Yolu	Cihangir	Turkish, Persian	Bilingual film
1970	Kan ve Tabanca	Fakir Ahmet	Turkish	
1970	Şimşek Hafiye		Turkish	
1970	Hedefte İki Kişi		Turkish	
1970	Bir Çuval Para		Turkish	
1971	Shayyadan		Persian	
1971	Hedefte İmzam Var	Tophaneli Murat	Turkish	
1971	Gurur ve Kin	Abbas	Turkish	
1971	Batıdan Gelen Adam		Turkish	
1971	Suçsuz Fırarı		Turkish	
1971	Caniler Uyumaz		Turkish	
1971	Asker Ahmet	Ahmet	Turkish	
1971	Tehlikeyi Severim		Turkish	
1971	Zagor	Zagor	Turkish	
1971	Zapata		Turkish	
1971	İpini Boynunda Bil		Turkish	
1971	Sevimli Haydut	Jack	Turkish	
1971	Adını Anmayacağım	Cemil Arkan	Turkish	
1971	Kanunsuz Sokak	Ali Deniz	Turkish	
1971	Kızgın Güneş	Ali	Turkish	
1971	Afacan Küçük Serseri	Himself	Turkish	
1971	Dört Ateşli Yosma		Turkish	
1972	Ölüme Yaklaşma		Turkish	
1972	Kırbaçlı Yosma		Turkish	
1972	Safakta Vuruşanlar		Turkish	
1972	Şeytan Kan Kusturacak	Kerem / the stranger	Turkish	Dual role
1972	Shaft's Big Score	Jerry	English	Credited as John Foster
1972	The Witches Mountain	Mario	Spanish	Spanish film; Credited as John Caffari
1973	Sakhreye Siah		Persian	Filmed in 1970, but released in 1973
1973	The Demons	Lord Jeffreys	French	French-Spanish-Portuguese film; Credited as John Foster
1973	They Call Me Shmil	Danny	Hebrew	Israeli film; Credited as John Ghaffari
1973	Ha-Meshahnei'a Ba'am	Tony	Hebrew	Israeli film; Credited as John Ghaffari
1974	Dick Turpin	Dick Turpin	Spanish	Spanish film; Credited as John Ghaffari
1981	Matad al buitre	John Martinelly	Spanish, English	Credited as John Ghaffari
1983	Hundra	Napatkin	Spanish, English	As producer also
1984	Yellow Hair and the Fortress of Gold	Shayowteewah		As producer also
1988	Gui ma bao biao zei mei ren		Cantonese	Hong Kong film
1990	Rescue Force	Jafar	English	
1990	La cruz de Iberia		Spanish	As producer

=== Television ===
Year	Film	Role(s)	Language	Notes
1975	Medical Center	Emissary	English	1 episode
1977	Hunter	Arab at Party	English	2 episodes
1978	Keefer	Resistance Member	English	TV film
