= María Salerno =

Spanish actress

- Born: 14 February 1948 (age 78); León, Castilla y León, Spain
- Other name: Marta Monterrey
- Occupation: Actress
- Years active: 1969-

María Salerno is a Spanish film and television actress. In the early years of her career she was credited as Marta Monterrey.

== Selected filmography ==
- More Dollars for the MacGregors (1970)
- Reverend's Colt (1970)
- Naked Therapy (1975)
- Inquisition (1976)
- The Legion Like Women (1976)
- Hooray for Divorce! (1982)
- The Secret Nights of Lucrezia Borgia (1982)
- Invierno en Marbella (1983)
- El misterio de Cynthia Baird (1985)

== Bibliography ==
- Luis Gasca. Un siglo de cine español. Planeta, 1998.
