= Jenny Llada =

- Born: 22 February 1953 (age 73); Barcelona, Spain
- Other name: María Eugenia Llada Cabrera
- Occupations: Vedette, presenter and actress
- Years active: 1965–present
- Children: Andrea Winkler Llada

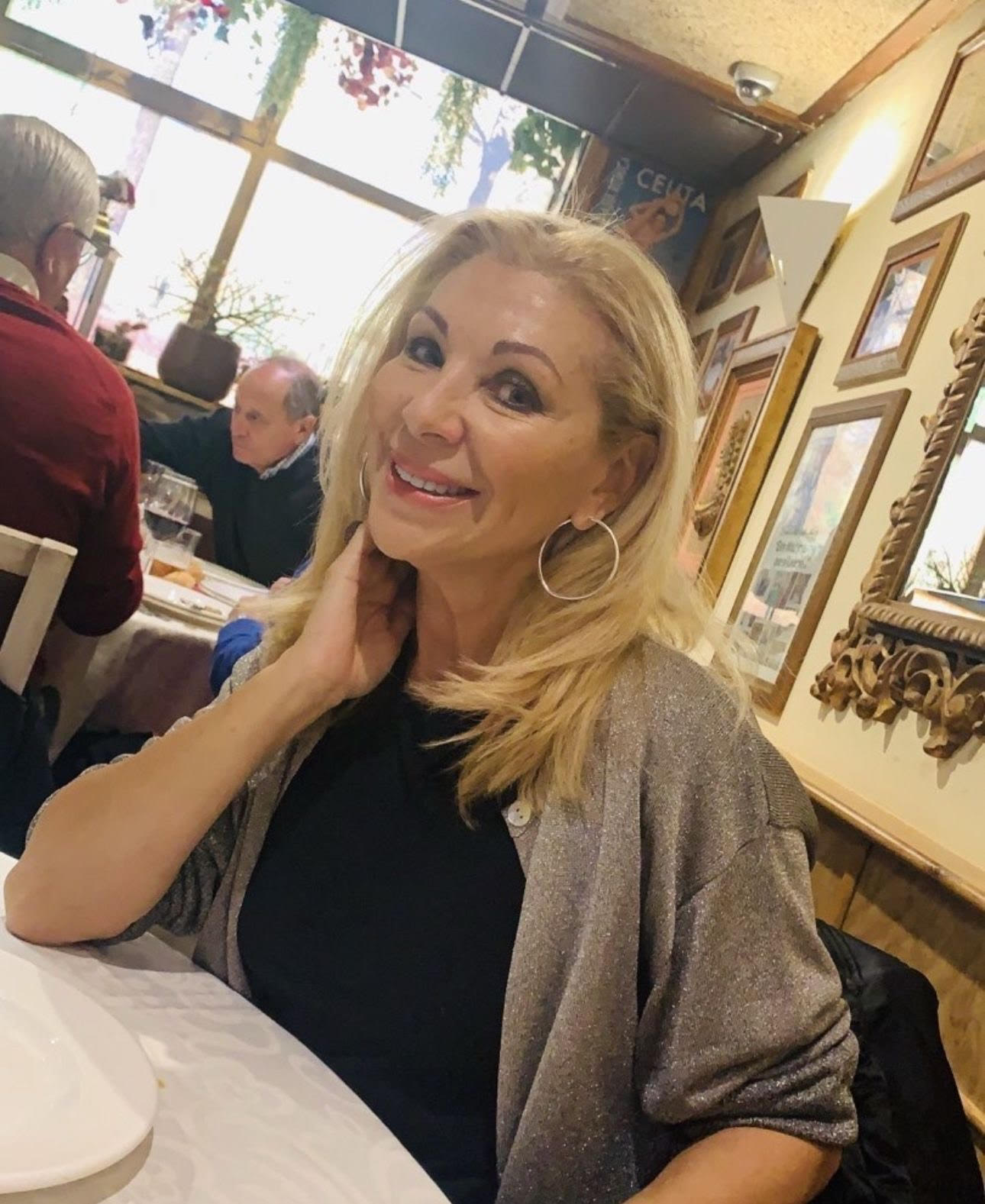

Jenny Llada (born 22 February 1953) is a Spanish vedette, actor, presenter and television actress.

== Selected filmography ==
- Inquisition (1978)
- The Man Who Knew Love (1978)
- The Worker (1983)

== Bibliography ==
- Jesús García Orts. Lina Morgan: de Angelines a Excelentísima Señora. Editorial Club Universitario, 2015.
- Àngel Comas. Joan Bosch: el cine i la vida. Cossetània Edicions, 2006.
