= Inquisition (film) =

- Directed by: Paul Naschy
- Written by: Paul Naschy
- Produced by: Roberto Pérez Moreno; Enrique Molina
- Starring: Paul Naschy; Daniela Giordano; Mónica Randall; Julia Saly
- Cinematography: Miguel Fernández Mila
- Edited by: Soledad López
- Music by: Máximo Barratas
- Production companies: Ancla Century Films; Anubis Films
- Distributed by: Sánchez Ramade
- Release date: 1978 (Spain)
- Running time: 86 minutes
- Countries: Spain; Italy
- Language: Spanish

Inquisition (Spanish: Inquisición) is a 1976 Spanish-Italian historical horror film written and directed by (and starring) Paul Naschy. It also features Daniela Giordano, Julia Saly and Mónica Randall. The film was shot in May and June 1976, and first shown in Spain in 1978. The special effects were handled by Fernando Florido, who outdid himself with his elaborate design for the demon Belphegor, seen during the film's bizarre dream sequence. Daniela Giordano loved the film and thought it was one of the best projects she ever worked on. An Argentinian one-sheet exists with the name of the film as Bajo el terror de la Inquisicion / Under the Terror of the Inquisition, but there is no evidence that the film was ever shown there theatrically.

Although the film was completed in 1976, it wasn't shown in Spain until 1978. The film was dubbed in English in 1976 (the intended "international version"), but it was never shown theatrically outside of Spain. The English-dubbed print was eventually sold directly to Home Video in the 1980s. The film has since been released in English on Blu-ray by Mondo Macabro.

== Plot ==
In medieval France, the plague is spreading across the countryside, and the ignorant peasants believe it to be the work of witches. Bernard de Fossey, the local "witchfinder", travels from town to town on a holy mission, aided by his two lecherous assistants Nicolas Rodier and Pierre Burgot, rooting out witches and executing them. Most of the women deny they are witches, but Fossey and his men torture them sadistically until they confess, at which point they are executed.

Catherine, a beautiful young girl in the village, is in love with Jean Duprat, who wants to marry her. Fossey develops a crush on Catherine unfortunately, and hires some highwaymen to rob and kill Jean in the forest. That night, Catherine has a dream in which she sees the killers being paid with coins to murder Jean, but she can't see the face of the ringleader.

Catherine makes a pact with Satan, agreeing to sell her soul to him if he will help her to avenge the death of her fiancé. She drifts into some bizarre dream sequences wherein she meets Satan (played by Paul Naschy in a leotard) and the red-eyed demon Belphegor, who eventually tell her that it was Fossey who paid for the killing of Jean Duprat.

Catherine seduces Fossey and slyly involves him in some immoral activities that wind up getting Fossey himself accused of witchcraft and the witchfinders torture him, shave his head and sentence him to death, along with Catherine. Naschy wore a full skullcap for the finale of the film. Catherine sacrifices her own life to insure that Fossey also pays for his crimes, as both of them are burned together at the stake in a fiery scene reminiscent of Ken Russell's 1971 film The Devils.

== Cast ==
- Paul Naschy—dual role as Bernard de Fossey / Satan
- Daniela Giordano as Catherine
- Mónica Randall as Madeleine
- Ricardo Merino as Nicolas Rodier
- Tony Isbert as Pierre Burgot
- Juan Luis Galiardo as Jean Duprat
- Julia Saly as Elvire
- Eva León as Pierril Fillé
- Eduardo Calvo as Émile
- Antonio Iranzo as Rénover
- Tota Alba as Mabille
- María Salerno
- Loreta Tovar
- Isabel Luque
- Belén Cristino
- Antonio Casas
- Jenny Llada as Denise, the brunette handmaiden

== Bibliography ==
- Bentley, Bernard. A Companion to Spanish Cinema. Boydell & Brewer 2008.
