= Ramiro Oliveros =

Spanish actor (1941–2023)

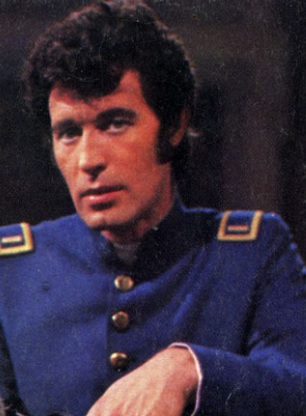
- Born: Ramiro Oliveros Fernández; 13 March 1941; Madrid, Spain
- Died: 27 April 2023 (aged 82); Madrid, Spain
- Other names: Ray Williams; Raymond Oliver
- Occupation: Actor
- Years active: 1972–2023

Ramiro Oliveros Fernández (13 March 1941 – 27 April 2023) was a Spanish actor.

== Life and career ==
Born and raised in Madrid, Oliveros originally studied medicine and worked as a nurse at Hospital Universitario de la Princesa. He studied acting in London (at the Royal Court Theatre), Paris, and Frankfurt, founding a theatre group in the latter. Returning to Spain in 1965, he founded the Nasto company and became a successful stage actor.

He became known to a wider audience after appearing on many TVE dramas. He made his film debut in Mario Camus' La leyenda del alcalde de Zalamea (1973). He appeared in numerous film and television roles during the following decades. To international audiences, he is best known for his genre film roles. He was sometimes credited in English-language productions under the aliases Ray Williams and Raymond Oliver.

In 1982, he starred in the Mexican telenovela Mañana es primavera, opposite Silvia Pinal. He was also a dubber, notably voicing George Peppard on the Antena 3 dub The A-Team.

== Personal life ==
Oliveros was married twice, and had three children.

=== Death ===
Oliveros died on 27 April 2023, at the age of 82, the same day as his Cannibal Apocalypse co-star Giovanni Lombardo Radice.

== Selected filmography ==
- Spanish Fly (1975)
- Naked Therapy (1975)
- Death's Newlyweds (1975)
- La cruz del diablo (1975)
- The Pyjama Girl Case (1977)
- Cannibal Apocalypse (1980)
- Hundra (1983)
- Yellow Hair and the Fortress of Gold (1984)

== Bibliography ==
- Goble, Alan. The Complete Index to Literary Sources in Film. Walter de Gruyter, 1999.
