= Naked Therapy =

1975 film

- Directed by: Pedro Lazaga
- Written by: Pedro Lazaga
- Starring: Carmen Sevilla; José María Íñigo; Ramiro Oliveros
- Cinematography: Antonio L. Ballesteros
- Edited by: Alfonso Santacana
- Release date: 1975
- Running time: 86 minutes
- Country: Spain
- Language: Spanish

Naked Therapy (Spanish:Terapia al desnudo) is a 1975 Spanish comedy film directed by Pedro Lazaga and starring Carmen Sevilla, José María Íñigo and Ramiro Oliveros.

== Cast ==
- Carmen Sevilla as Doctora Sol Esteve
- José María Íñigo as Viajero
- Ramiro Oliveros as Doctor Ríos
- María Salerno as Marta
- Manuel Zarzo as Inspector Sánchez
- Fernando Hilbeck as Doctor Álex Céspedes
- Rafael Hernández as Enrique
- Inés Morales as Doctora Madrigal
- Rosa Valenty as Recepcionista
- Carmen Martínez Sierra as Carola
- Beatriz Savón as Julia
- Mónica Rey as Alicia
- Rafael Conesa as Guillermo
- Ángela Ayllón as Pura
- Francisco Ortuño as Carcelero
- Ramón Lillo as Doctor Gordillo
- Juan Antonio Soler as Doctor Rosales
- Alfonso Castizo as Policía 1º
- José Luis Manrique as Policía 2º
- María Esperanza Navarro as Doctora Redondo
- Alfredo Mayo as Director del sanatorio
- Juan Luis Galiardo as Ricardo
- Manolo Codeso
- Emilio Gutiérrez Caba

== Bibliography ==
- Mira, Alberto. The A to Z of Spanish Cinema. Rowman & Littlefield, 2010.
