= La ragazza dal pigiama giallo (soundtrack) =

Soundtrack album by Riz Ortolani and Amanda Lear
- Released: 1978
- Genre: Pop music, Euro disco
- Label: Cinevox
- Producer: Riz Ortolani

La ragazza dal pigiama giallo (Italian for The Girl in the Yellow Pyjama) is a soundtrack album for Italian film of the same name, released in 1978 by Italian label Cinevox. The album includes the instrumental score by composer Riz Ortolani as well as two songs with vocals by Amanda Lear, recorded at studio Trafalgar in Rome, Italy. The album remains unreleased on compact disc.

== Track listing ==
Side A:

1. "La ragazza dal pigiama giallo" (Riz Ortolani) – 3:53
2. "Un uomo nella strada" (Riz Ortolani) – 4:05
3. "Look at Her Dancing" (Riz Ortolani, Amanda Lear) – 4:14
4. "La fuga" (Riz Ortolani) – 3:55

Side B:

1. "Your Yellow Pyjama" (Riz Ortolani, Amanda Lear) – 4:17
2. "Incontro sul battello" (Riz Ortolani) – 3:44
3. "Il corpo di Linda" (Riz Ortolani) – 3:48
4. "Un uomo nella strada" (Titoli finali) (Riz Ortolani) – 4:04

== Credits ==
- Giorgio Agazzi – sound engineer
- Amanda Lear – lead vocals (tracks A3 and B1)
- Riz Ortolani – composer, arranger
