= Dennis Price filmography =

Dennis Price (1915–1973) was an English actor. He made his professional debut at the Queen's Theatre in September 1937 alongside John Gielgud in Richard II. He appeared in several films produced by Ealing Studios and the Boulting brothers. Between 1965 and 1967, he appeared in the BBC television series The World of Wooster, where his performance as Jeeves was described in The Times as "an outstanding success". He also appeared in The Invisible Man (1958 TV series), in the 1958 episode, 'Behind the Mask'.

== Filmography ==
- No Parking (1938) as Extra (uncredited)
- A Canterbury Tale (1944) as Peter Gibbs
- A Place of One's Own (1945) as Dr. Selbie
- The Echo Murders (1945) as Dick Warren
- Caravan (1946) as Sir Francis Castleton
- The Magic Bow (1946) as Paul de la Rochelle
- Hungry Hill (1947) as Greyhound John
- Dear Murderer (1947) as Richard Fenton
- Holiday Camp (1947) as Sq. Ldr. Hardwick
- Jassy (1947) as Christopher Hatton
- Master of Bankdam (1947) as Joshua Crowther
- The White Unicorn (1947) as Richard Glover
- Easy Money (1948) as Joe Henty
- Snowbound (1948) as Neil Blair
- Good-Time Girl (1948) as Michael 'Red' Farrell
- The Bad Lord Byron (1949) as Lord Byron
- Kind Hearts and Coronets (1949) as Louis / Louis's father
- Helter Skelter (1949) as Lord Byron (uncredited)
- The Lost People (1949) as Ridley
- The Dancing Years (1950) as Rudi Kleiber
- Murder Without Crime (1950) as Matthew, Stephen's Landlord
- The Adventurers (1951) as Clive Hunter
- I'll Never Forget You (1951) as Tom Pettigrew
- Lady Godiva Rides Again (1951) as Simon Abott
- The Magic Box (1951) as Harold
- Song of Paris (1952) as Matthew Ibbetson
- The Tall Headlines (1952) as Maurice Fletcher
- Noose for a Lady (1953) as Simon Gale
- Murder at 3am (1953) as Inspector Peter Lawton
- The Intruder (1953) as Leonard Pirry
- Time Is My Enemy (1954) as Martin Radley
- For Better, for Worse (1954) as Debenham
- That Lady (1955) as Mateo Vasquez
- Oh... Rosalinda!! (1955) as Maj. Frank
- Private's Progress (1956) as Brig. Bertram Tracepurcel
- Charley Moon (1956) as Harold Armytage
- Port Afrique (1956) as Robert Blackton
- A Touch of the Sun (1956) as Digby Hatchard
- Fortune Is a Woman (1957) as Tracey Moreton
- The Naked Truth (1957) as Nigel Dennis
- Danger Within (1959) as Capt. Rupert Callender
- I'm All Right Jack (1959) as Bertram Tracepurcel
- Don't Panic Chaps! (1959) as Krisling
- School for Scoundrels (1960) as Dunstan
- Oscar Wilde (1960) as Robert Ross
- Tunes of Glory (1960) as Major Charles Scott, M.C.
- Piccadilly Third Stop (1960) as Edward
- The Millionairess (1960) as Dr. Adrian Bland
- The Pure Hell of St Trinian's (1960) as Gore Blackwood
- Five Golden Hours (1961) as Raphael
- No Love for Johnnie (1961) as Flagg
- The Rebel (1961) as Jim Smith
- Double Bunk (1961) as Watson
- Watch It, Sailor! (1961) as Lt. Cmdr Hardcastle
- Victim (1961) as Calloway
- What a Carve Up! (1961) as Guy Broughton
- Play It Cool (1962) as Sir Charles Bryant
- The Pot Carriers (1962) as Smooth Tongue
- Go to Blazes (1962) as Withers
- Behave Yourself (1962)
- Kill or Cure (1962) as Dr. Julian Crossley
- The Amorous Prawn (1962) as Prawn (Mr. Vernon)
- The Cool Mikado (1963) as Ronald Fortescue
- The Wrong Arm of the Law (1963) as Educated Ernest (uncredited)
- The V.I.P.s (1963) as Cmdr. Millbank
- The Cracksman (1963) as Grantley
- Doctor in Distress (1963) as Dr. Blacker
- Tamahine (1963) as Charles Poole
- Murder Most Foul (1964) as Harris Tumbrill
- A Jolly Bad Fellow (1964) as Dr. John Hughes
- The Horror of It All (1964) as Cornwallis Marley
- The Comedy Man (1964) as Tommy Morris
- The Earth Dies Screaming (1964) as Quinn Taggart
- Curse of the Voodoo (1965) as Maj. Lomas
- A High Wind in Jamaica (1965) as Mathias
- Ten Little Indians (1965) as Dr. Armstrong
- Just like a Woman (1967) as Bathroom Salesman
- Jules Verne's Rocket to the Moon (1967) as The Duke of Barset
- The Haunted House of Horror (1969) as Inspector Bill Bradley
- Venus in Furs (1969) as Percival Kapp
- The Magic Christian (1969) as Winthrop
- Some Will, Some Won't (1970) as Benson
- The Horror of Frankenstein (1970) as The Graverobber
- The Rise and Rise of Michael Rimmer (1970) as Fairburn
- Vampyros Lesbos (1971) as Dr. Alwin Seward
- Twins of Evil (1971) as Dietrich
- Tower of Evil (1972) as Bakewell
- Pulp (1972) as The Englishman
- The Adventures of Barry McKenzie (1972) as Mr. Gort
- Dracula, Prisoner of Frankenstein (1972) as Doctor Frankenstein
- Alice's Adventures in Wonderland (1972) as King of Hearts
- That's Your Funeral (1972) as Eugene Soul
- Go for a Take (1972) as Dracula, actor
- Theatre of Blood (1973) as Hector Snipe
- Horror Hospital (1973) as Mr. Pollack
- The Erotic Rites of Frankenstein (1973) as Doctor Frankenstein
- Quartier de femmes (1974) as L'avocat Linsday
- Son of Dracula (1974) as Van Helsing
