= The Pyjama Girl Case =

- Italian theatrical release poster
- Directed by: Flavio Mogherini
- Written by: Flavio Mogherini; Rafael Sánchez Campoy
- Produced by: Giorgio Salvioni
- Starring: Ray Milland; Dalila Di Lazzaro; Michele Placido; Howard Ross; Ramiro Oliveros; Rod Mullinar; Mel Ferrer
- Cinematography: Carlo Carlini
- Edited by: Adriano Tagliavia
- Music by: Riz Ortolani
- Production companies: Zodiac Produzioni; P.I.C.A.S.A. Films
- Distributed by: Capitol International
- Release date: 12 January 1978
- Running time: 103 minutes
- Countries: Italy; Spain
- Languages: Italian; English

The Pyjama Girl Case (Italian: La ragazza dal pigiama giallo, "The Girl in the Yellow Pyjamas") is a 1978 Italian giallo film directed by Flavio Mogherini.

== Film information ==
The film is based on a real story, the "Pyjama Girl" case, one of Australia's most well known unsolved murders. It was filmed in Australia and produced by studio Zodiac Produzioni, in co-operation with Producciones Internacionales Cinematográficas Asociadas (PICASA).

The soundtrack album La ragazza dal pigiama giallo was released in Italy in 1978, and consisted of the instrumental score by composer Riz Ortolani as well as two songs with vocals by Amanda Lear: the theme tune "Your Yellow Pyjama" and "Look at Her Dancing".

== Synopsis ==
The film consists of two parallel narratives. One tells about an investigation of a murder of a girl whose severely burned body has been found on a beach in Sydney. The police have a suspect in the murder, but the retired inspector Thompson is convinced they are wrong and continues his own investigation. The second is a story of a young Dutch girl, Glenda, and her partner, an Italian named Antonio. Although they are in a relationship, Glenda keeps seeing other men.

== Cast ==
- Ray Milland as Inspector Thompson
- Dalila Di Lazzaro as Glenda Blythe
- Michele Placido as Antonio Attolini
- Mel Ferrer as Professor Henry Douglas
- Howard Ross as Roy Conner
- Ramiro Oliveros as Inspector Ramsey
- Rod Mullinar as Inspector Morris
- Giacomo Assandri as Quint
- Eugene Walter as Dorsey
- Fernando Fernán Gómez as Forensics Detective

== Reception ==
Mikel J. Koven, writing in La Dolce Morte, suggests the film borrows from the Italian police procedural poliziotteschi films of the era, noting "despite the use of the word giallo in the original Italian title, [the film] focuses more on Inspector Thompson's (Ray Milland) investigation than the events leading up to the murder being investigated".
