= The Witches Mountain =

- Directed by: Raúl Artigot
- Written by: José Truchado; Juan Cortés; Félix Fernández; Raúl Artigot
- Starring: Patty Shepard; Cihangir Ghaffari; Mónica Randall
- Cinematography: Fernando Espiga; Ramón Sempere
- Edited by: Pedro del Rey
- Music by: Fernando García Morcillo
- Production company: Azor Films
- Distributed by: Avco Embassy Pictures (US)
- Release date: 1972
- Running time: 86 minutes
- Country: Spain
- Language: Spanish

The Witches Mountain (Spanish: El monte de las brujas) is a 1972 Spanish horror film directed by Raúl Artigot and starring Patty Shepard, Cihangir Ghaffari and Mónica Randall. A photographer takes an assignment in the Cantabrian mountains, in Asturias, northern Spain, but soon has supernatural encounters.

== Plot ==
Photo journalist Mario (Cihangir Gaffari, credited as John Caffari) who has just split up with his girlfriend, Carla, (Mónica Randall) decides to accept a job located in the remote and mountainous region of Northern Spain. On his travels, he meets a gorgeous young writer on a beach named Delia (Patty Shepard). He invites her to go with him and she accepts his invitation to travel to the mountains.

When they stop at an inn for the night, Delia is certain that someone or something is peering in on her from the window. Making matters worse, the next morning Mario finds that the jeep he’d procured for the journey is not where he left it. Without a vehicle, they have no choice but to hike the rest of the way but find the truck along the way, stowed in a village thought to be long abandoned. From here, they take shelter in a small cottage offered to them by an elderly woman named Santa (Ana Farra). Here things start to get increasingly strange for the couple. When Mario vanishes in the middle of the night without a trace, he suddenly returns with a used roll of film containing images of people he swears weren’t in the pictures he took.

Soon, Mario starts to wonder if the stories about witches operating in the area might be more fact than fiction, and that if they are real, if they aren’t targeting Delia as their next acquisition.

== Cast ==
- Patty Shepard as Delia
- Cihangir Ghaffari as Mario (credited as John Caffari)
- Mónica Randall as Carla
- Víctor Israel as Posadero
- Inés Morales as Mujer Gato
- Ana Farra

== Bibliography ==
- Ness, Richard. From Headline Hunter to Superman: A Journalism Filmography. Scarecrow Press, 1997.
