= Síndico =

The Síndico of a municipality in the Dominican Republic is called indistinctly alcalde or Mayor. The latter name is preferred as to avoid confusing the title with the similarly sounding alcaide (lit. prison warden). The Síndico is the elected governor of the municipality, serving for a term of four years.

The Síndico's office daily duties are restricted to the local governance. The Síndico is responsible for the coordination of waste collection, upkeep of public spaces (parks, undeveloped urban parcels, streets, city ornate, traffic light control, sewage and most public utilities). In practice most of it duties are centered in light street repairs.

New or big road projects, like overpasses, bridges, pedestrian crossings, etc. are handled by the Public Works Ministry (Ministerio de Obras Públicas in Spanish) office), under the direct control of the Central Government. Subcontracting garbage collection and management, overseeing the use of public spaces and arbitrating neighborhood land use disputes are managed by the National Property office (Oficina de Bienes Nacionales in Spanish) is also controlled by the Síndico's office. Water, electrical supply and public transportation coordination are handled by several Central Government's offices.
