= Hundra =

1983 Italian-Spanish fantasy film directed by Matt Cimber

- Poster
- Directed by: Matt Cimber
- Screenplay by: José Truchado; John F. Goff; Matt Cimber; José Truchado
- Story by: Matt Cimber
- Produced by: Cihangir Ghaffari
- Starring: Laurene Landon; Cihangir Ghaffari; María Casal; Ramiro Oliveros
- Cinematography: John Cabrera
- Edited by: Claudio M. Cutry
- Music by: Ennio Morricone
- Production company: Continental Movie Productions; S.T.A.E. Productions
- Distributed by: Izaro Films (Spain); Film Ventures International (U.S.)
- Release dates: 23 July 1983 (Spain); 1 August 1983 (U.S.)
- Running time: 108 minutes (uncut)
- Countries: Spain; United States; Italy
- Language: English

Hundra is a 1983 sword-and-sandal film co-written and directed by Matt Cimber, and starring Laurene Landon as an Amazonian warrior, along with Cihangir Ghaffari (who also produced the film), María Casal and Ramiro Oliveros.

The film was a Spanish-American-Italian co-production, distributed in the United States by Film Ventures International on August 1, 1983. It has been described as a cult film.

== Plot ==
Hundra belongs to a tribe of Amazons. She is the only tribe member of her age who has never been with a man. She declares she will keep it like that. One day when she goes hunting, her tribe is outnumbered and slaughtered by barbarians. As the only survivor she travels to an old wise woman and asks her for advice, but to her surprise she is told she ought to become a mother in order to prevent the final extinction of the Amazons.

Hundra seeks a father for her child. The first candidate has bad manners and it turns out that he is a sadist. While she continues her search she is confronted by a murderous robber baron who only wants to kill her. Later she encounters an effeminate pimp. Eventually she gets to know a gentleman who works as a healer. She asks him to become the father of her child but she is told that a man won't get in the right mood if he is approached too bluntly. Hundra asks other women to help her to live up to his expectations. She succeeds in seducing him, gets pregnant and delivers a child.

An evil pagan priest kidnaps Hundra's daughter. Thus Hundra is coerced into joining a sinister ritual where the priest's followers humiliate her. During this session she is informed that her new friends have freed the child. She fights back and returns to her homeland. The female narrator explains there was proof that Hundra's spirit kept on living in all women ever since.

== Cast ==
- Laurene Landon as Hundra
- Cihangir Ghaffari as Nepakin
- María Casal as Tracima
- Ramiro Oliveros as Pateray
- Luis Lorenzo as Rothrar
- Tamara as Chrysula
- Victor Gans as Landraza
- Cristina Torres as Shandron
- Bettina Brenner as Hundra's mother
- María Vico as the midwife
- Fernando Bilbao as Torente
- Jorge Bosso as Gordoza
- Frank Braña and Eduardo Fajardo as Chieftains
- Azucena Hernández as Villager

== Production ==
There was originally a body double for the nude scene, which Laurene Landon was not going to do. However, the double had a different body type than Landon's. "They had her in the water because I wasn't going to show my boobs. She was maybe five-feet-five. I think Matt Cimber did that on purpose to get me to do that nude scene in the water", Landon said, "I saw the footage of that and said, 'That's not me. My ass isn't that big. I'll do it myself'".

Filming took place on-location in Almería, Segovia, Manzanares el Real and Guadix, Spain; and at Cinecittà Studios in Rome.

== Reception ==
Paul Mavis of DVD Talk described Hundra as a "genial, rollicking, comic book sword and sandals fantasy" and argued for the film's cult status. Monster Pictures stated Hundra was "one of the great underrated films of the era". John Shatzer of BloodTypeOnline.com wrote a negative review but gave Hundra credit by saying a few action scenes were exciting. Judge David Johnson of DVD Verdict instead regarded the action scenes and Landon's general performance as "stilted," only allowing the film's "camp" value. Keith Breese of Filmcritic.com praised Laurene Landon as "a striking action lead" and compared the character Hundra to Xena.

Mondo Digital categorised Hundra as one of the better contemporary copies of Conan the Barbarian and pointed out that Hundra preceded the film adaptation of Red Sonja. Richard Scheib of Moria called Hundra a "better incarnation of the spirit of the Red Sonja stories than the Red Sonja (1985) film ever was". Landon herself called the film "a female version of Conan the Barbarian".

== Home media ==
In 2007 the DVD label Subversive published Hundra with a commentary by Matt Cimber and Laurene Landon and a making-of. The edition also includes a comic book and Ennio Morricone's soundtrack on a CD. Andrew Borntreger of Bad Movies complained about missing subtitles and closing credits being hard to read. Jonathan Doyle of Media Party criticised the anamorphic transfer and the sound quality of what he called a "cult oddity".

In September 2022, a remastered Blu-Ray was released by boutique label Dark Force Entertainment.

== Follow-up ==
A spiritual sequel featuring much of the same cast and crew, Yellow Hair and the Fortress of Gold, was released the following year.
