= Santa Bàrbara Castle =

Castle in Alicante, Spain

Coordinates: 38°20′56″N 0°28′41″W

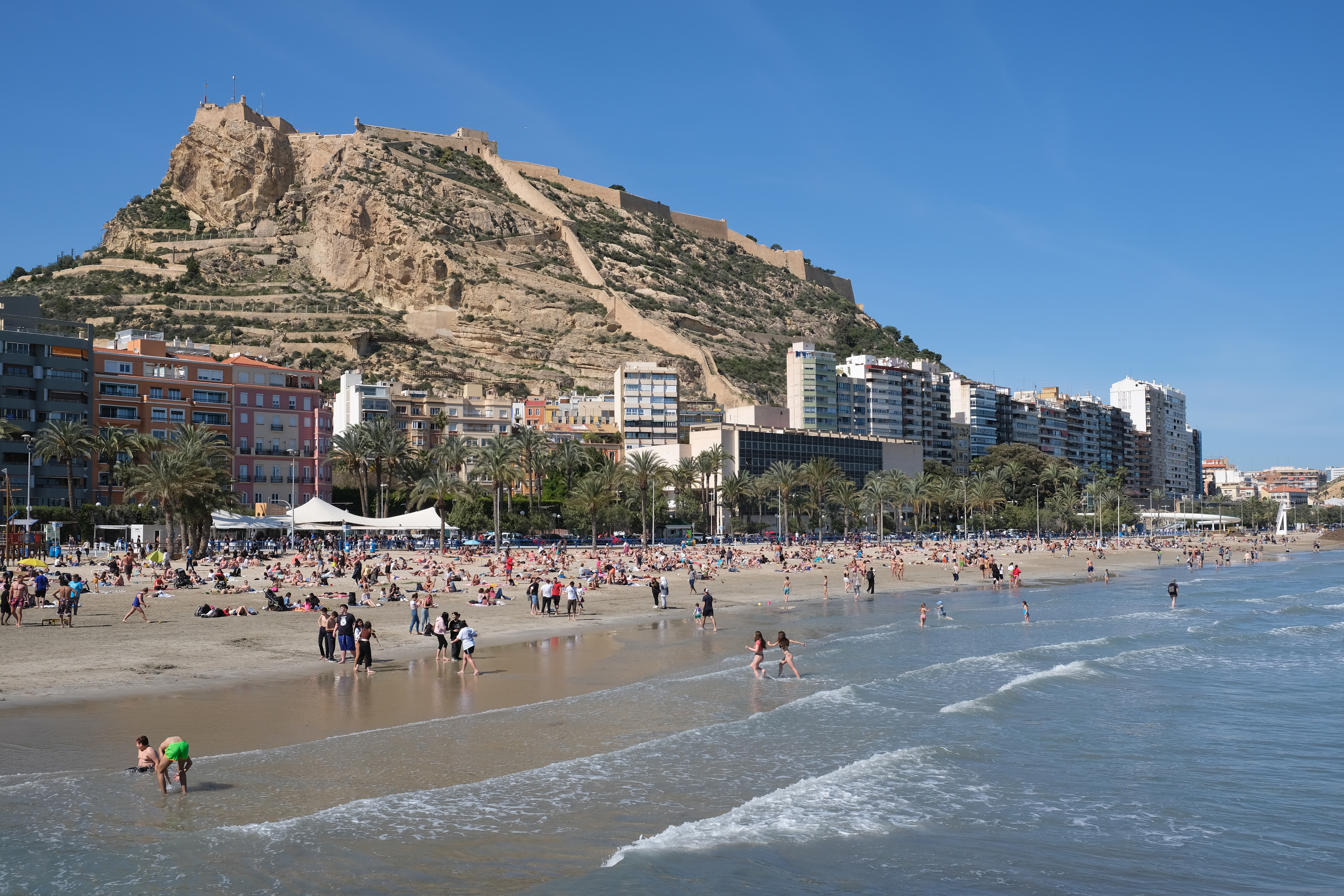
Mount Benacantil and Castle of Santa Bàrbara seen from Postiguet Beach.

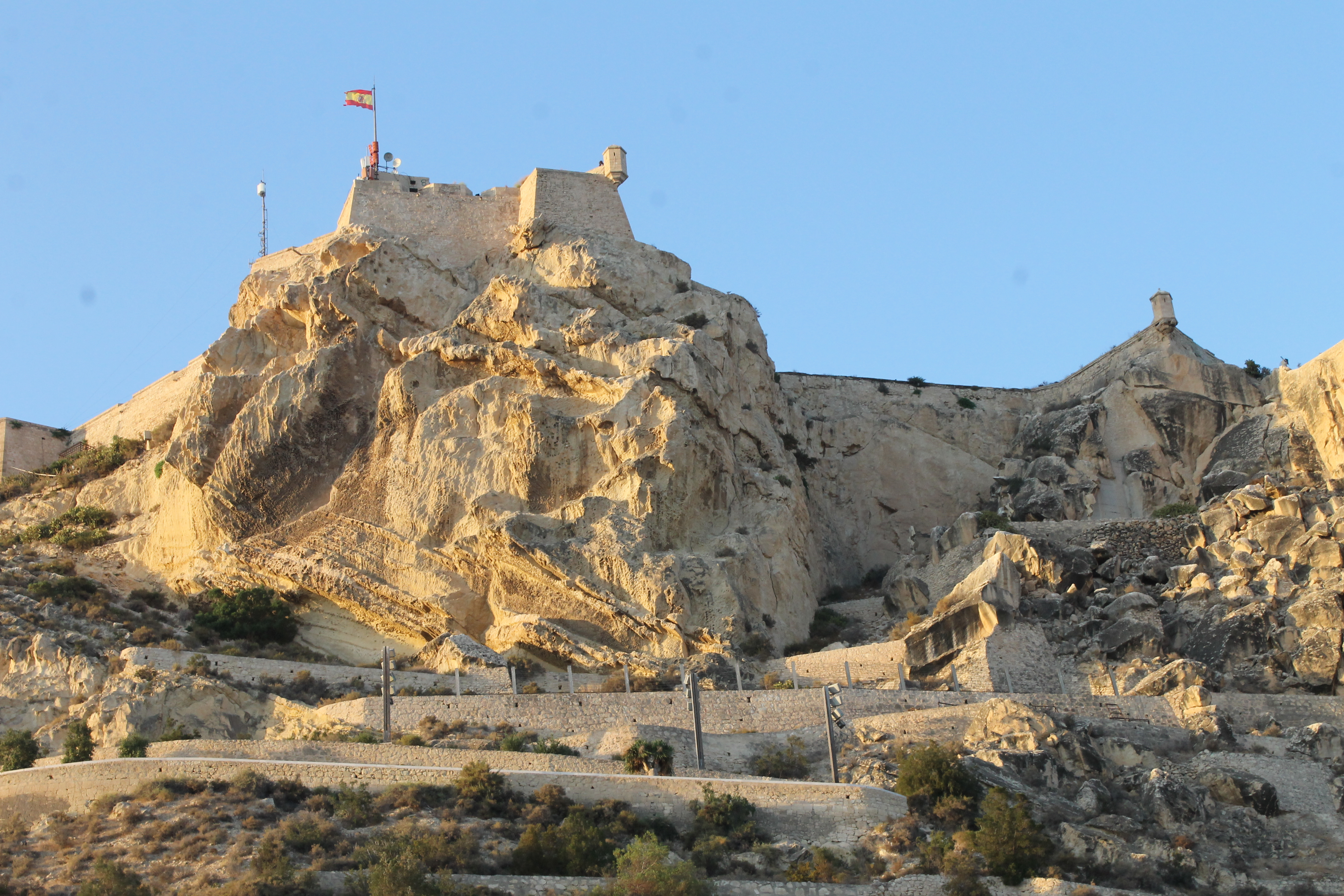
Santa Bàrbara Castle

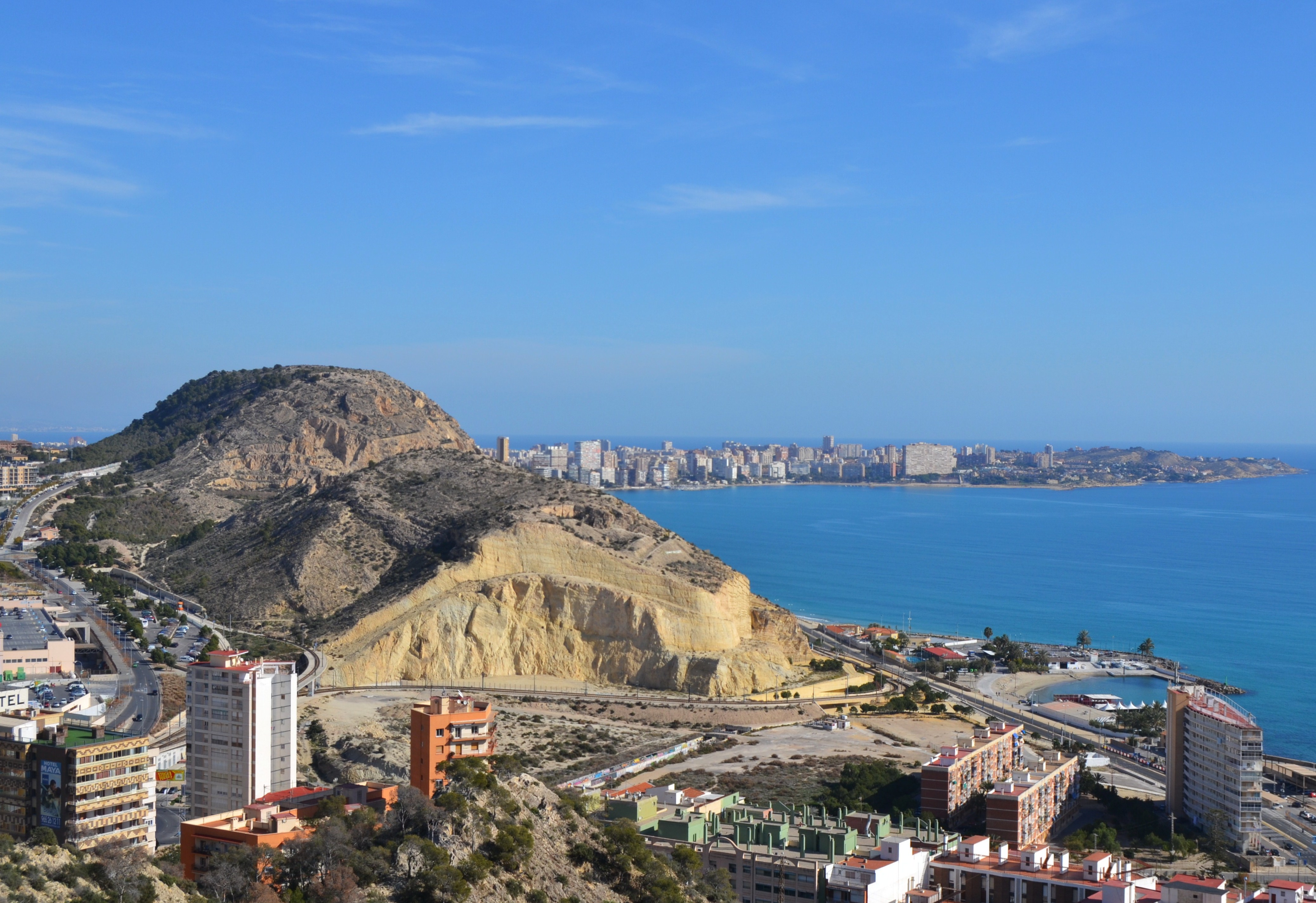
The Serra Grossa from the Castle of Santa Bàrbara.

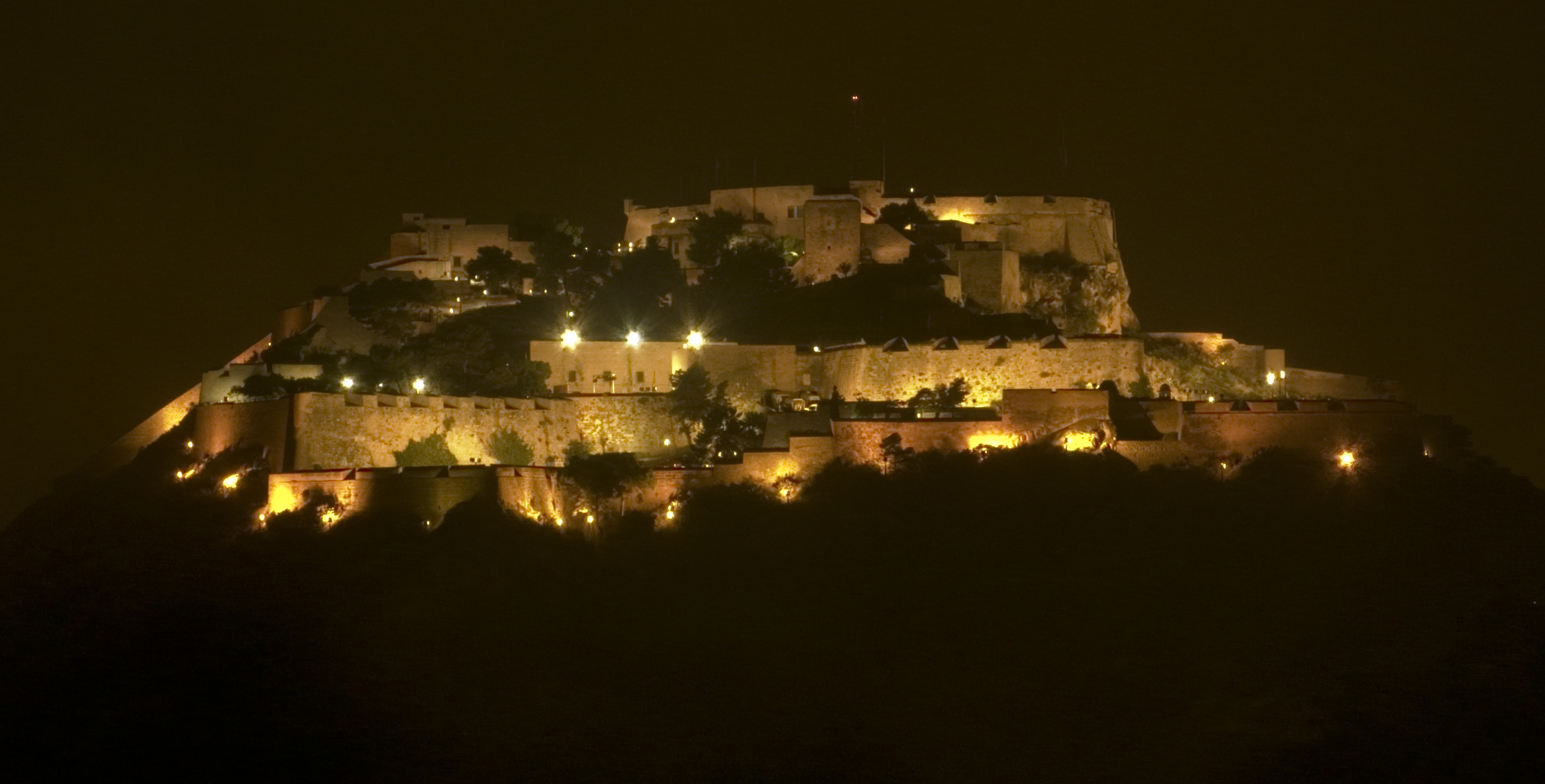
Night view of the castle from the Serra Grosa

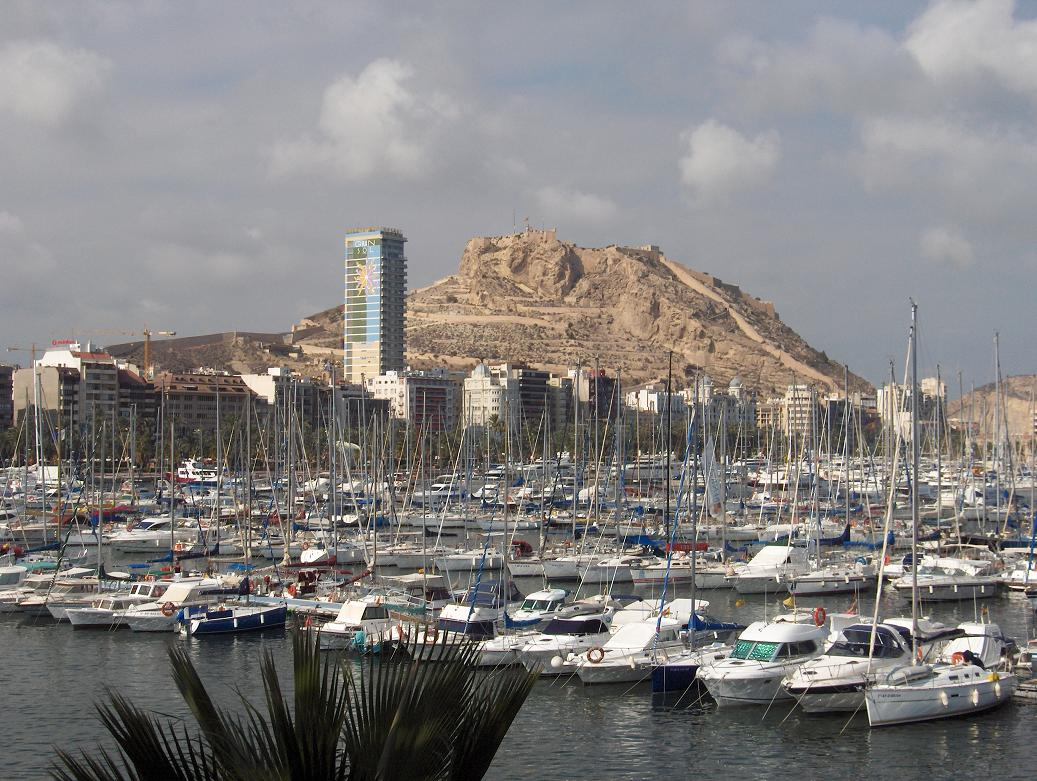
Location of the castle in Alicante

Santa Bàrbara Castle (Valencian: Castell de Santa Bàrbara, Spanish: Castillo de Santa Bárbara) is a fortification in the center of Alicante, Valencian Community, Spain. It stands on Mount Benacantil (166 m) bordering the sea, which gave it enormous strategic value since from it you can see the entire bay of Alicante and its land surroundings. The image of the mountain from the beach resembles a face, which is why it is called "the face of the Moor" and is an icon of the city of Alicante.

There are historians who date the origin of the place name to the words bena, an Arabic transcription of pinna, 'peña' in Latin, and laqanti, an adjective that comes from Laqant, Alicante for the Arabs.

== History ==
Bronze Age, Iberian, and Roman artifacts have been found on the slopes of the mountain, but the origins of the castle date to the 9th century at the time of Muslim control of the Iberian Peninsula, from 711 till 1296. The Arab medieval geographer Al-Idrisi calls this mountain Banu-lQatil, and the toponym may derive from the words pinna (Arabic for "peak") and laqanti, adjectival form of Laqant, the Arabic name for Alicante.

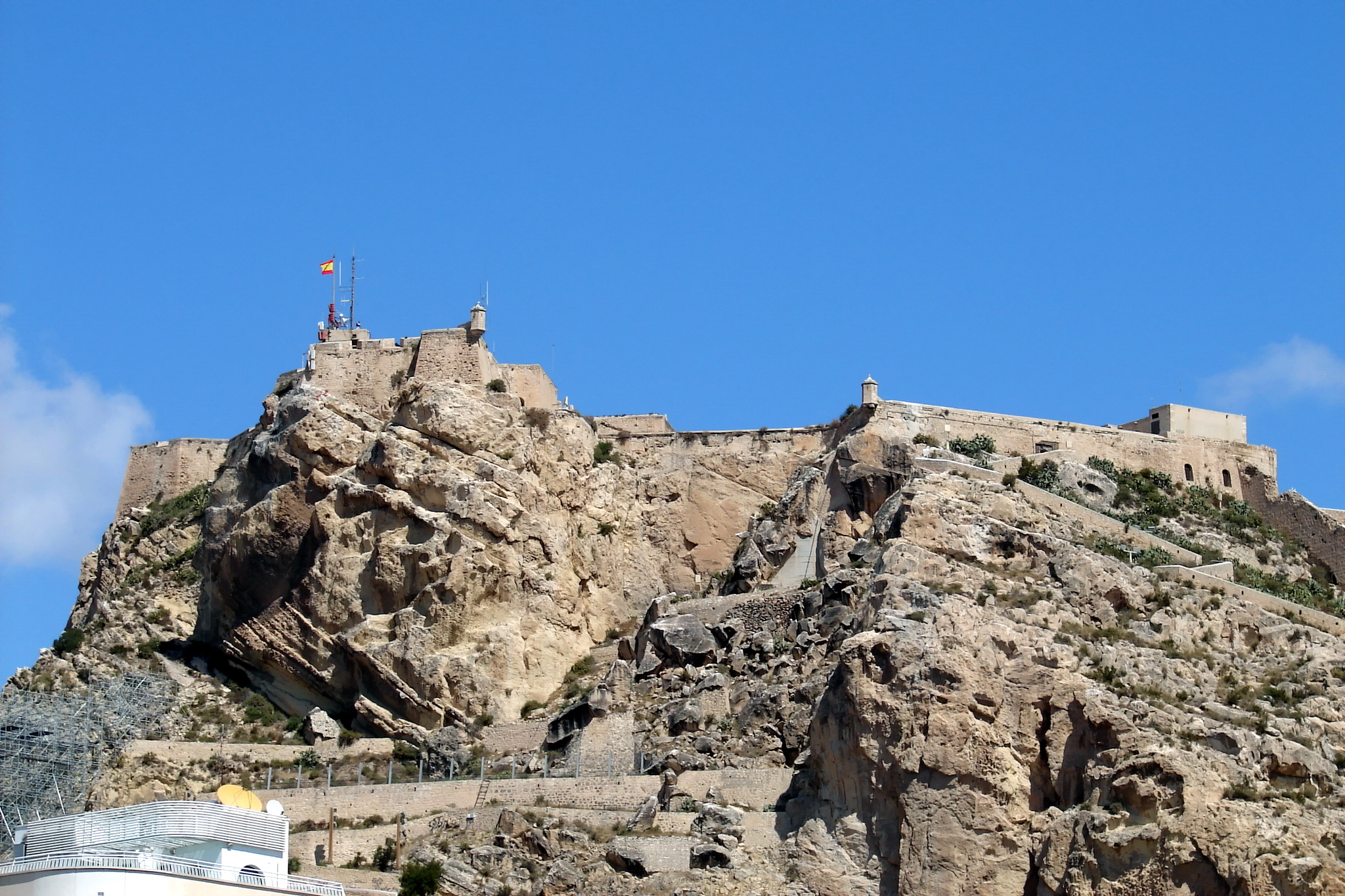

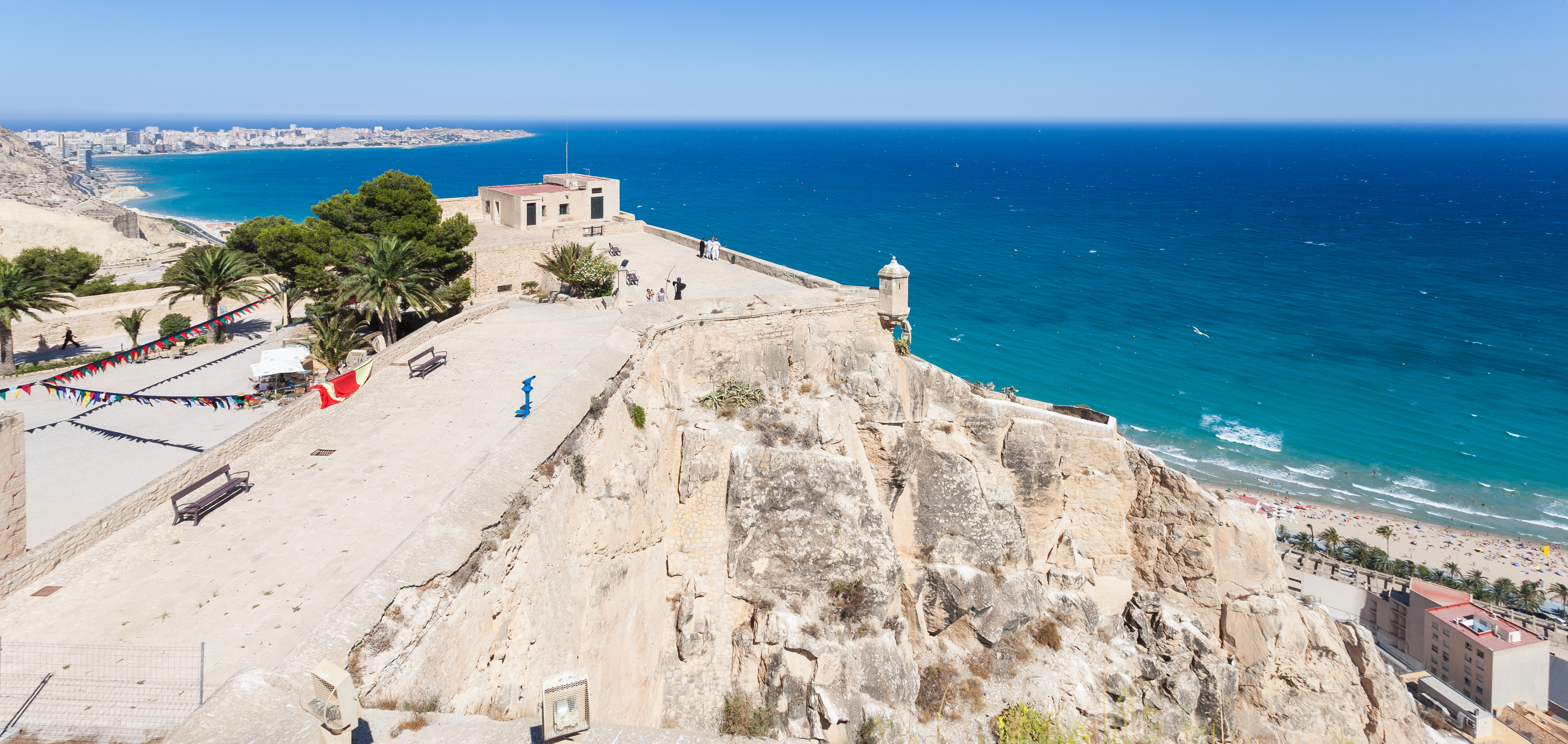
View of the interior.

On 4 December 1248, the castle was captured by Castilian forces led by Alfonso of Castile. It was named after Saint Barbara, on whose feast day the castle was recaptured from the Arabs. It was conquered by the Aragonese in 1296 during the reign of James II of Aragon, who ordered its reconstruction. Peter IV of Aragon, Charles I of Spain and Philip II of Spain would oversee further reconstructions.

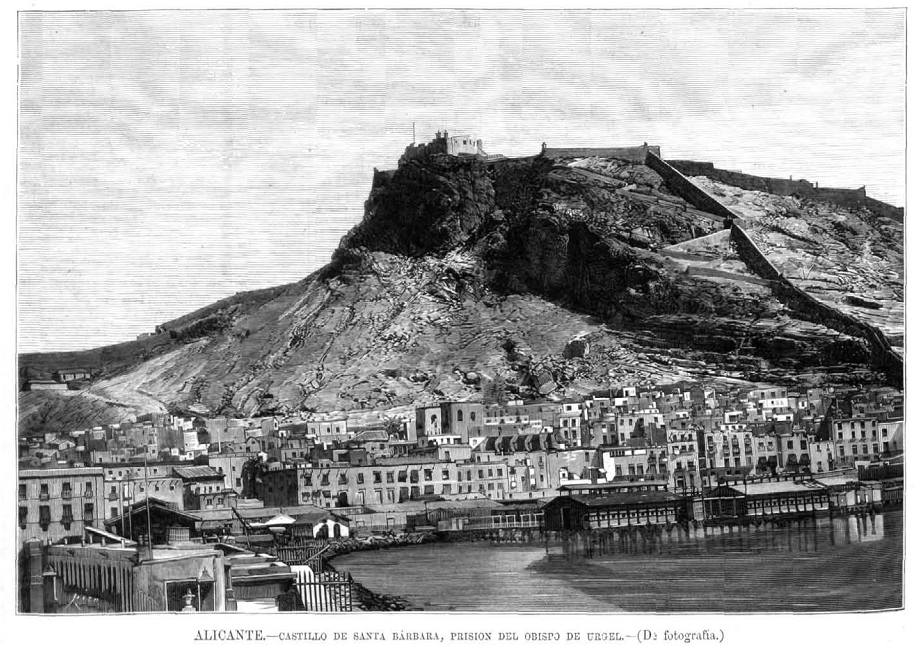
Castillo de Santa Bárbara, prison of the Bishop of Urgel, in the Spanish magazine La Illustration Española y Americana. 1875. Original photo by Jean Lauren (1816-1886)

The castle was bombarded in 1691 by a French squadron. During the War of the Spanish Succession, it was held by the British for three years. In 1873, it was bombarded, along with the city, by the cantonalistas from the frigate Numancia.

From the 18th century the military role of the castle has declined and it was used sometimes as a prison. From April 1939, with the end of the Spanish Civil War, it was used as a Francoist concentration camp for Republican prisoners until the end of that year.

The castle remained abandoned until 1963, when it was opened to the public. Lifts have been installed inside the mountain (€2.70 charge in December 2023 but free for adults aged 65 on production of ID). There are some guided tours at €3 per person and there are refreshments and other amenities at and near the summit.

== Castle grounds ==
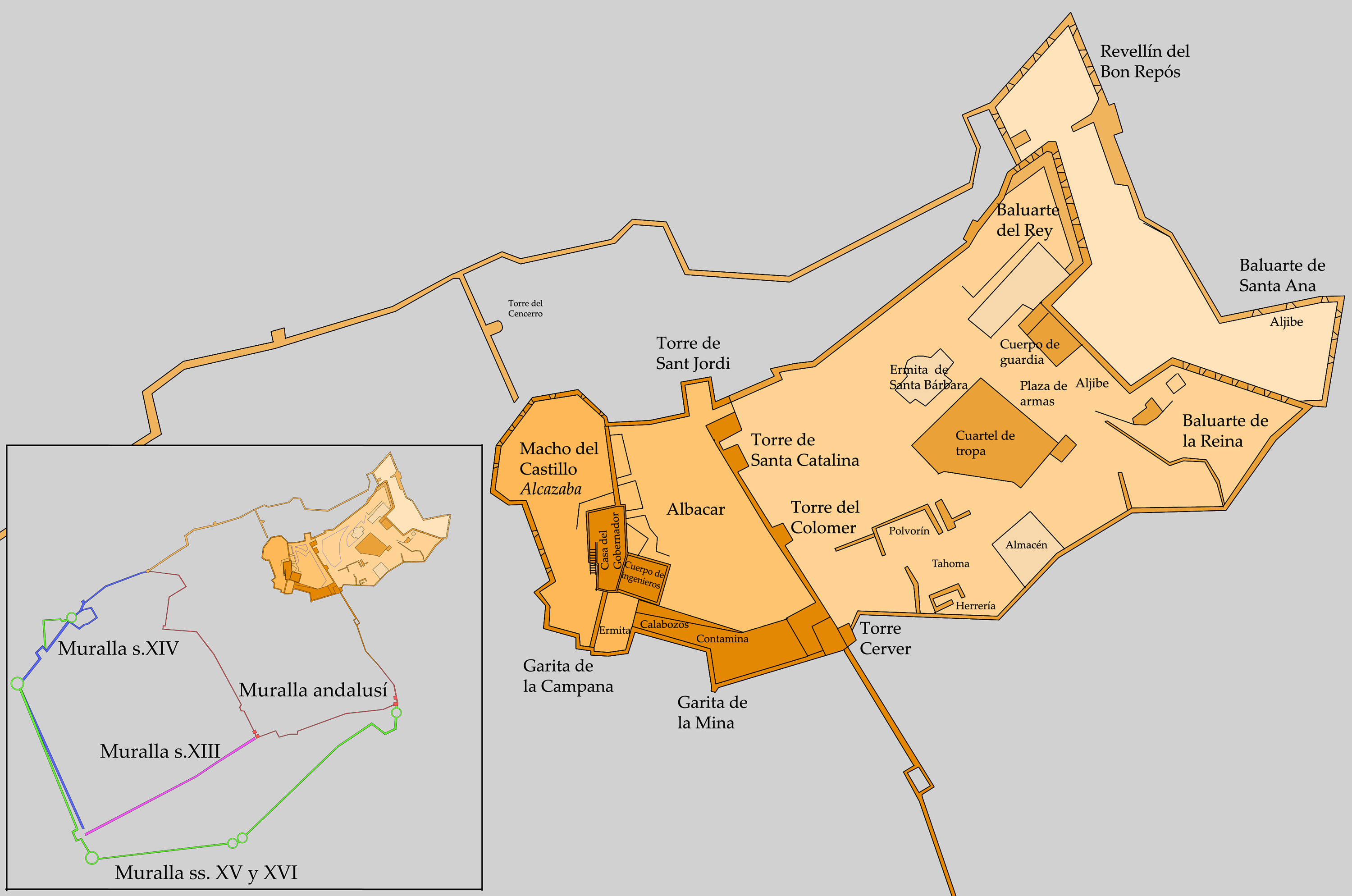
Plan of the fortress and its relationship with the city walls (in Spanish)

The castle is divided into three distinct areas:

The first of them is the tallest, and is known as "La Torreta" as the old Torre del Homenatge is located there. It has the oldest vestiges of the entire fortress, foundations from the 11th to the 13th centuries. In this enclosure we see, among others, the so-called Bastion of the English, as well as other facilities: Engineers Park, Noble Room, which was a hospital, Governor's House, etc. The highest esplanade is known as “Macho del Castillo”; The old citadel was there. The intermediate enclosure corresponds to the most important rooms completed in 1580: Felipe II Hall, former Corps of the Troop in front of the large Patio de Armas behind whose back are the ruins of the hermitage of Santa Bàrbara, Guard Corps, Baluarte de la Reina, etc.

The lower area where we find the Ravellí del Bon Repós dates back to the 18th century, which currently serves as a parking lot and where the monument to the illustrious Alicante soldier Félix Berenguer de Marquina is located, who was captain general of the Philippines and viceroy of the New Spain. The large white marble shield (18th century) above the access door to the second enclosure was in the Royal Consulate of the Sea, a building destroyed by an explosion.

Inside is the Museum of the City of Alicante (MUSA), made up of five rooms that are complemented by the Renaissance Cistern.

Currently, some areas of the castle are being restored.

== Gallery ==
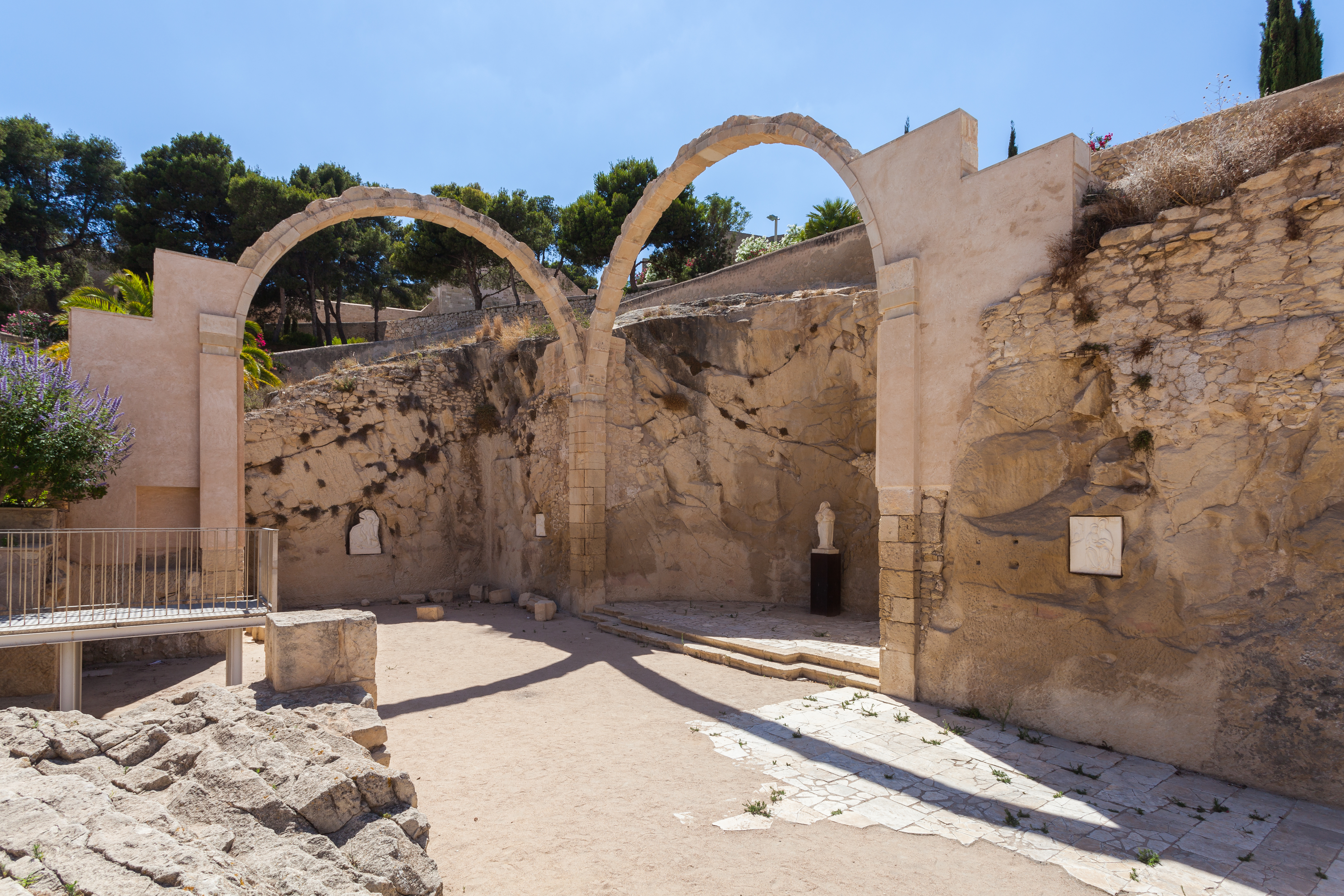
Remains of the church

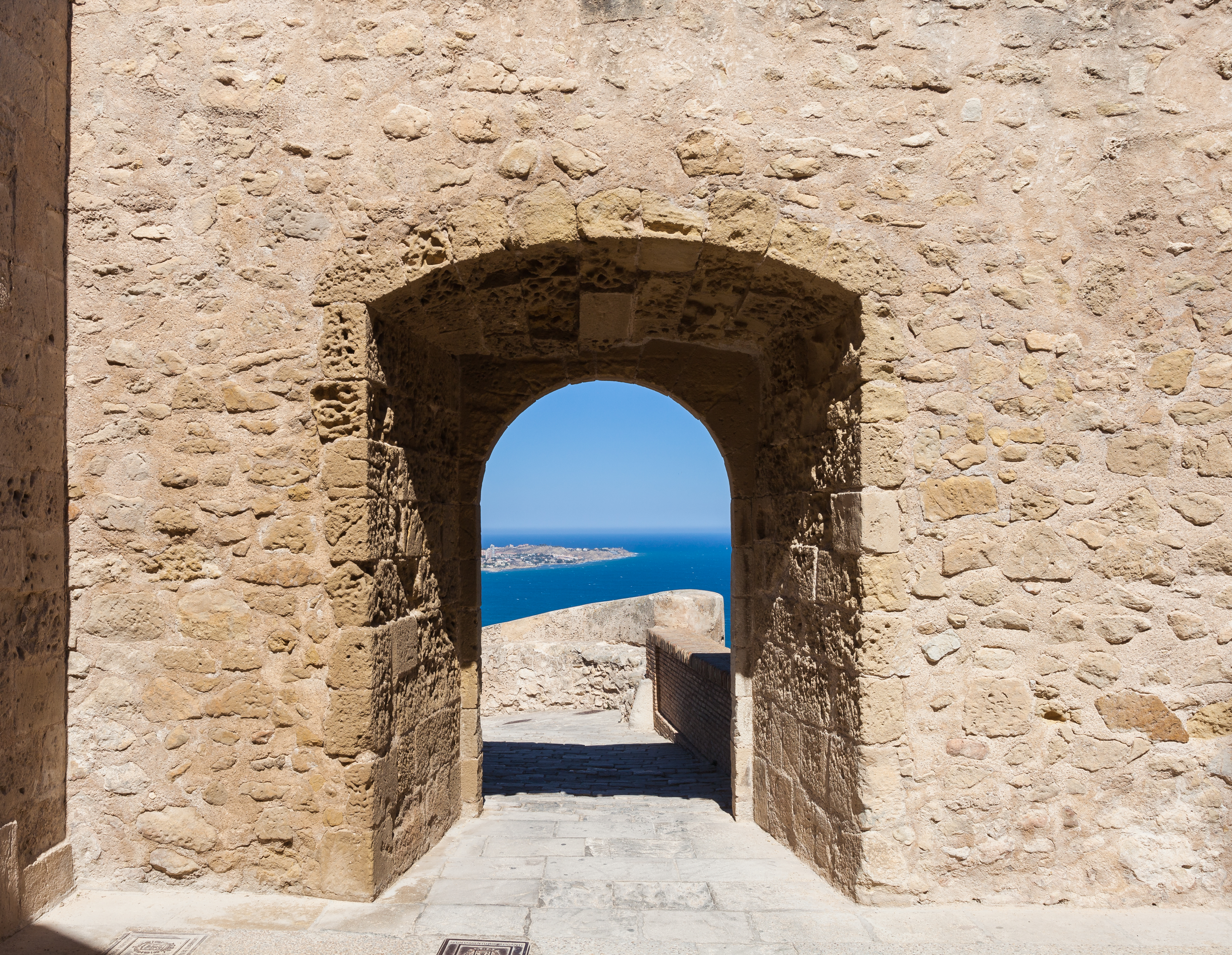
Castle wall gate

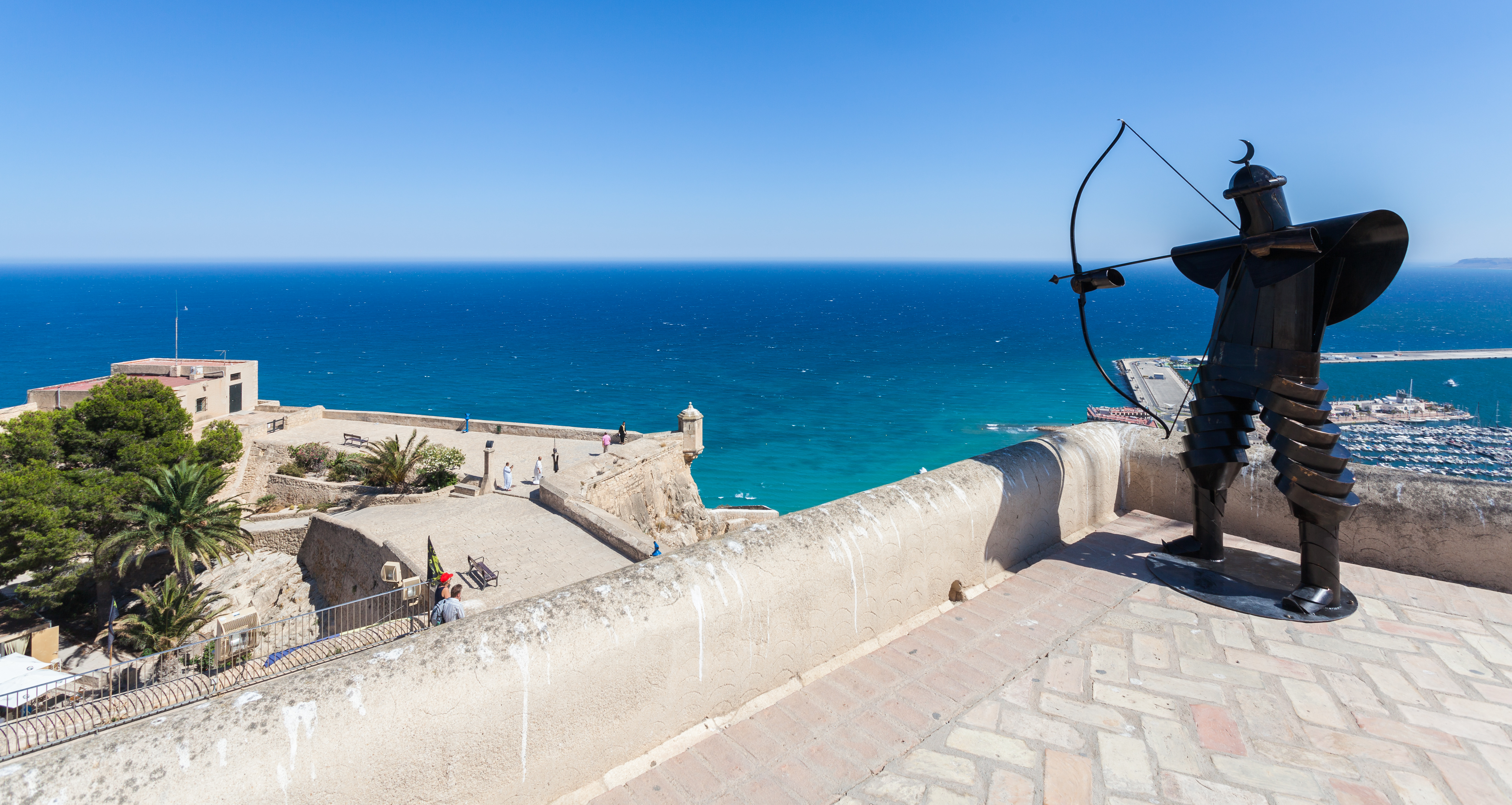
Sculpture of an archer

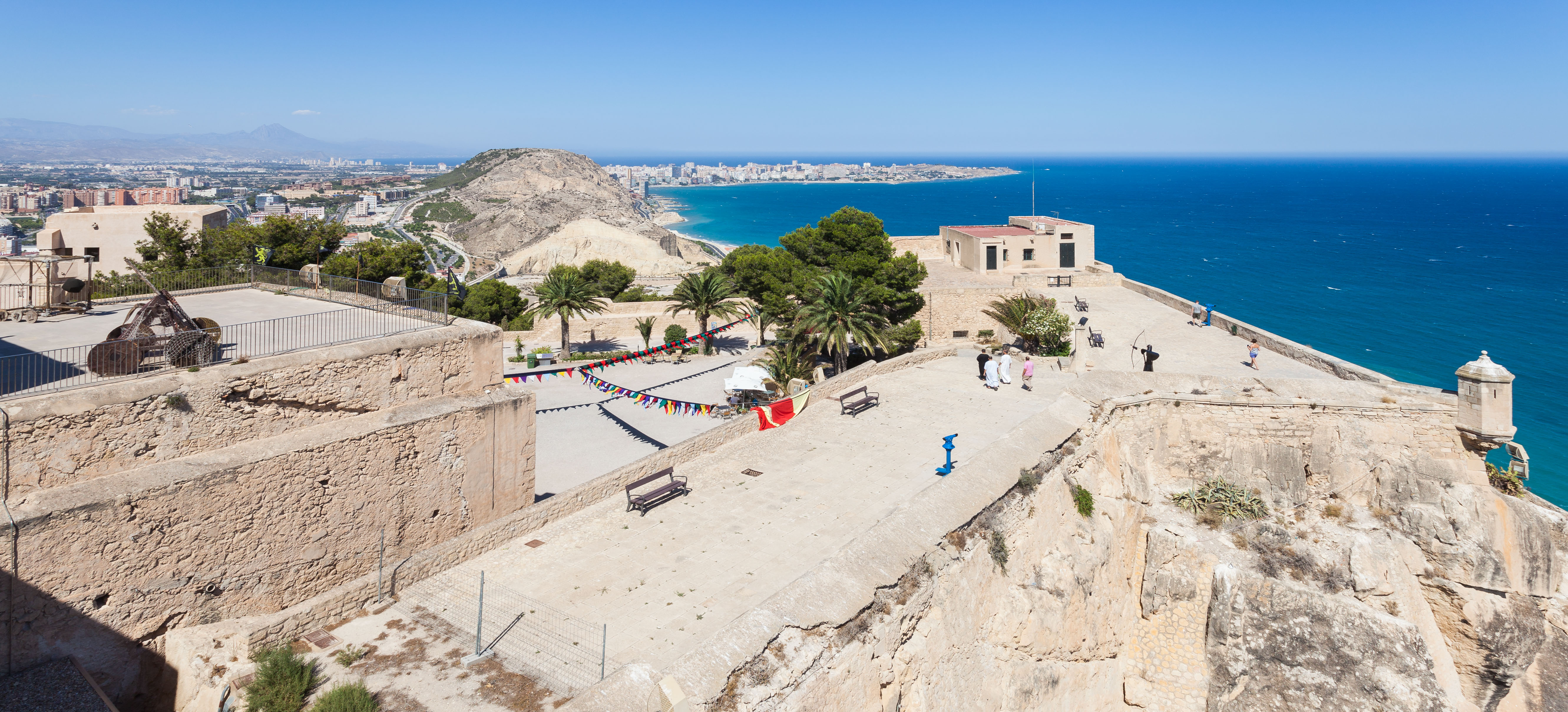
View from the top floor

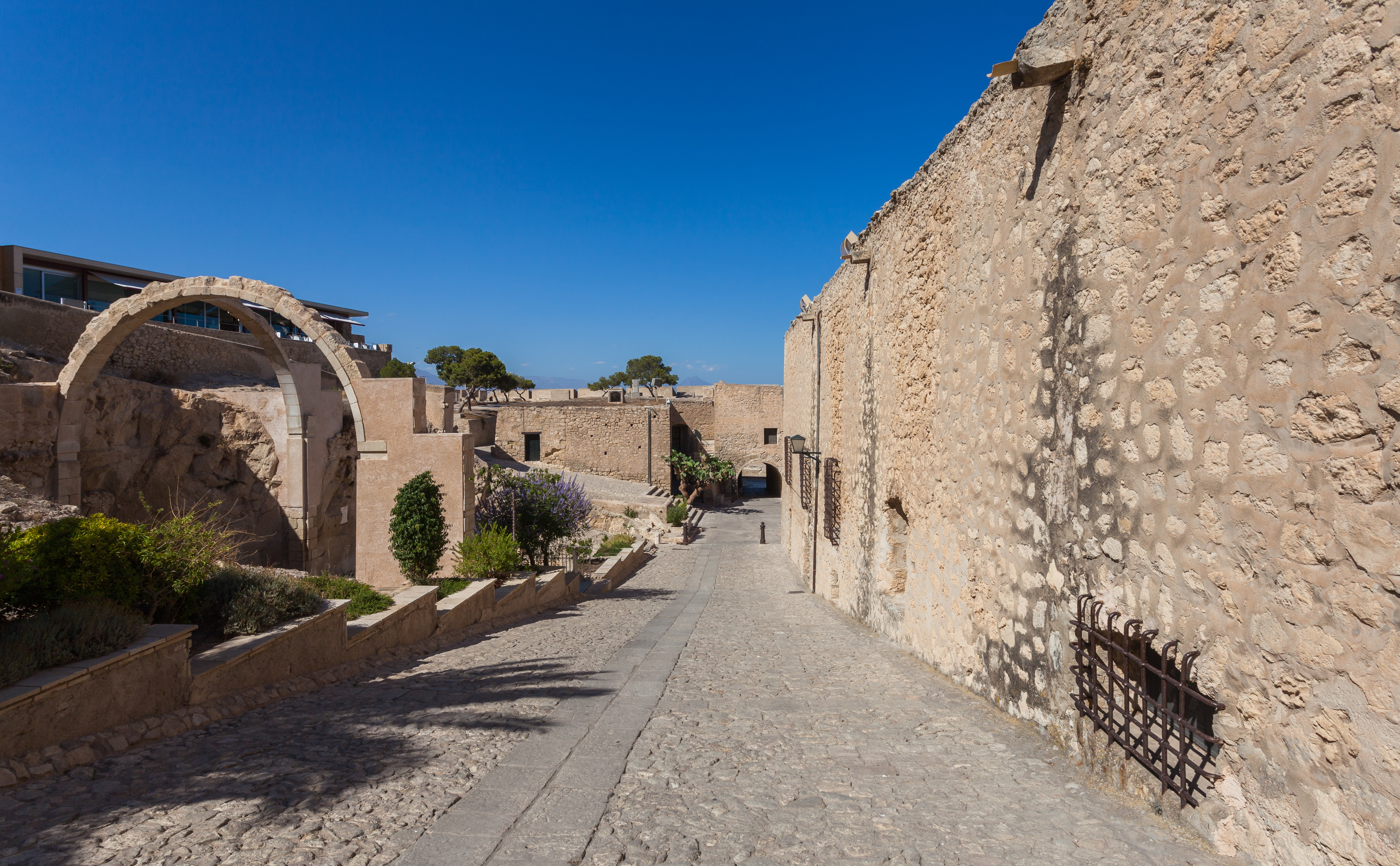
View of the inside of the castle

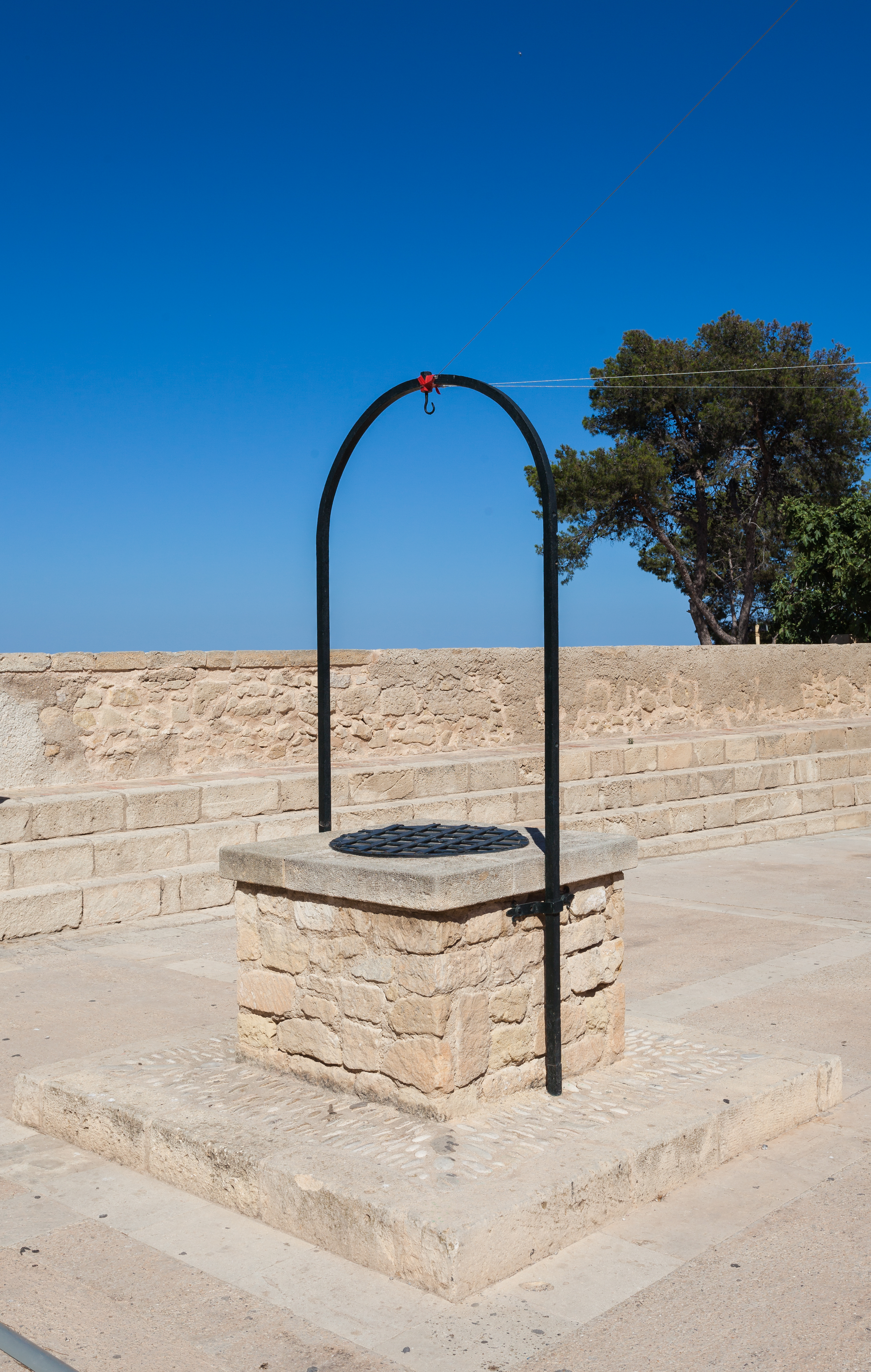
Well

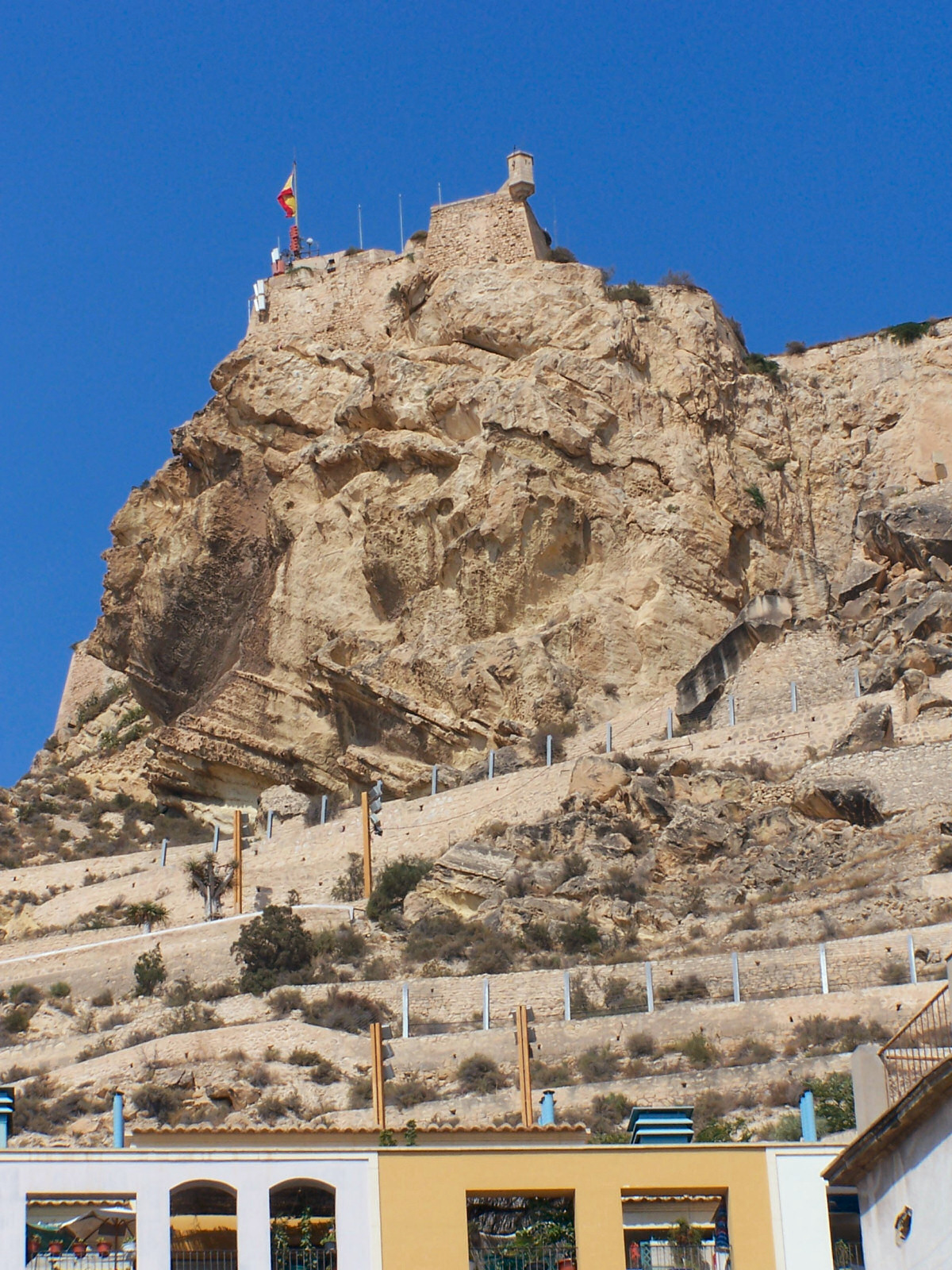
View of the Castle from the Santa Cruz neighborhood where you can see the "face of the Moro"

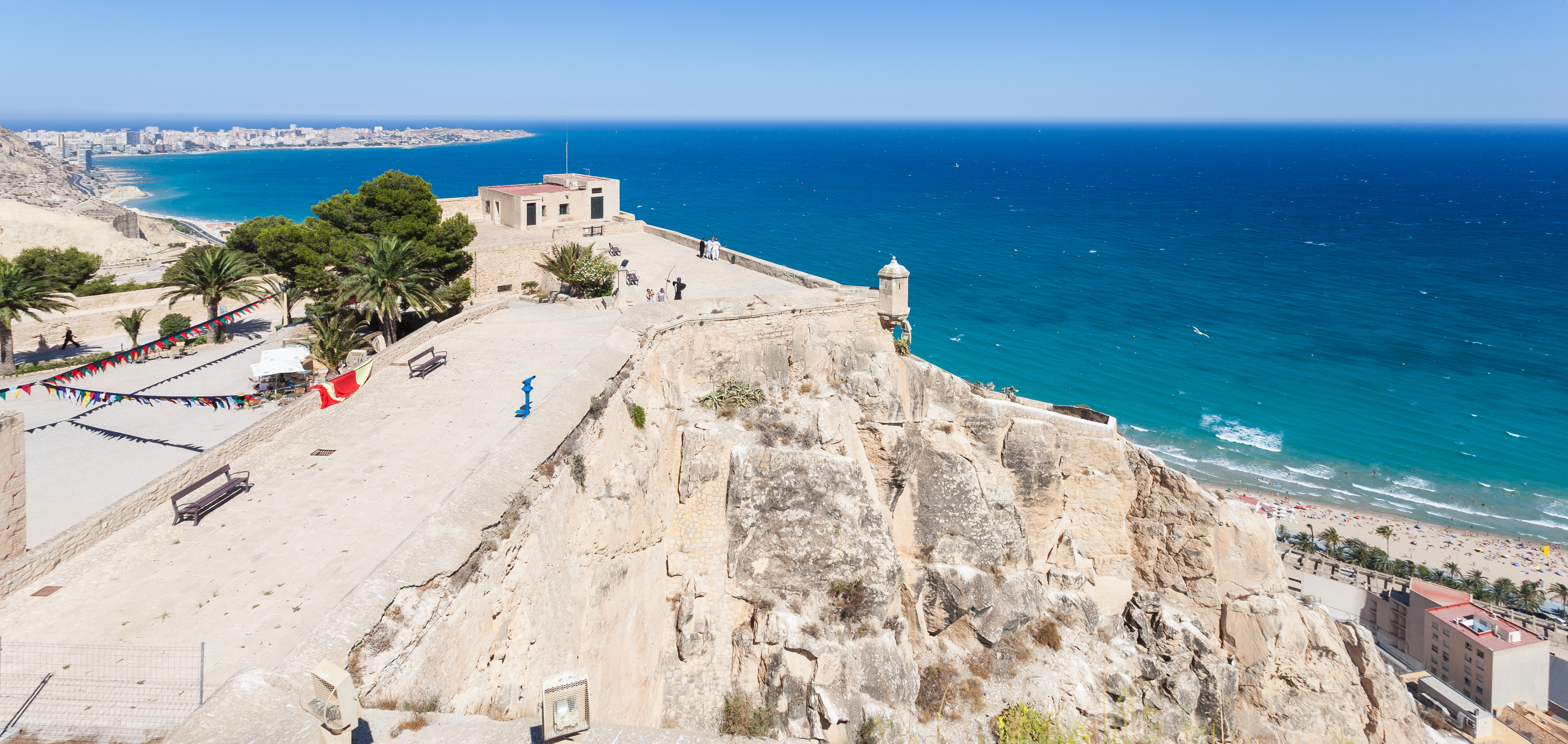
View of the inside

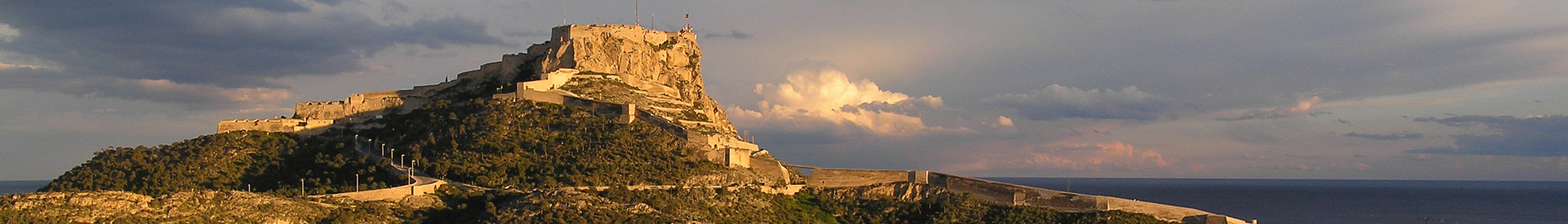
Panoramic of the castle
