= Teresa Alcocer =

Spanish film editor

- Born: María Teresa Alcocer López
- Occupation: Film editor
- Years active: 1944–1994

Teresa Alcocer was a prolific Spanish film editor who worked in the industry from the 1940s through the 1990s.

== Selected filmography ==
- The Long Winter (1992)
- Deadly Deception (1991)
- Dragón Rapide (1986)
- The Long Holidays of 1936 (1976)
- Watch Out Gringo! Sabata Will Return (1972)
- The Boldest Job in the West (1972)
- Umbracle (1970)
- Spain Again (1969)
- The Day the Hot Line Got Hot (1968)
- Twice a Judas (1968)
- Professionals for a Massacre (1967)
- Superargo contro Diabolikus (1966)
- The Texican (1966)
- Sicario 77, vivo o morto (1966)
- Dollar of Fire (1966)
- One Hundred Thousand Dollars for Ringo (1965)
- Desperate Mission (1965)
- Man from Canyon City (1965)
- Guns of Nevada (1965)
- Agent 3S3: Passport to Hell (1965)
- Five Thousand Dollars on One Ace (1965)
- Ranch of the Ruthless (1965)
- The Italians They Are Crazy (1958)
