= Antonio Mollica =

- Born: Italy
- Occupation: Filmmaker

Antonio Mollica is an Italian filmmaker. Credited as Tony Mulligan, he directed his first western film in 1967 named Born to Kill. With Manuel Esteba and José Ulloa he penned Veinte pasos para la muerte (1970), and was credited as Ted Mulligan.

== Filmography ==
| Year | Title | Director | Assistant director | Producer | Writer |
|---|---|---|---|---|---|
| 1970 | Il corsaro | ✓ | | | |
| 1970 | Twenty Paces to Death | ✓ | | | |
| 1968 | È stato bello amarti | | | ✓ | |
| 1967 | Born to Kill | ✓ | | ✓ | ✓ |
| 1964 | Le fils de Tarass Boulba | | ✓ | | |
