= César Ojinaga =

Spanish actor (1926–1999)

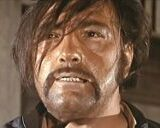
- César Ojinaga as bandit leader Navarro in Don’t Wait, Django, Shoot! (1967)
- Born: 31 March 1926; Madrid, Spain
- Died: 20 April 1999 (aged 73); Barcelona, Spain
- Occupation: Actor
- Years active: 1954–1989

César Ojinaga (31 March 1926 – 20 April 1999) was a Spanish actor known for his roles in western films directed by Joan Bosch. He starred in Una tumba para Johnny Ringo (1967), La legión del silencio, Companys, proceso a Cataluña (1979), Delincuentes (1956), Los gamberros (1954), and Nunca es demasiado tarde (1955), Dallas (1974), Chico, chica, ¡boom! (1968), and La diligencia de los condenados (1970). Ojinaga died in Barcelona on 20 April 1999, at the age of 73.

== Filmography ==
- Misión extravagante (1954) as Enfermo
- Once pares de botas (1954) (uncredited)
- Los gamberros (1954)
- La canción del penal (1954)
- Nunca es demasiado tarde (1956) as Miguel
- La legión del silencio (1956) as Lucas
- Delincuentes (1957) as Martino
- El ángel está en la cumbre (1958) as Vicepresidente club
- Las locuras de Bárbara (1959)
- Five Thousand Dollars on One Ace (1965) as Glenn, Dueño del rancho
- Guns of Nevada (1965) as Coulbert
- Man from Canyon City (1965) as Fred Bogart
- La dama de Beirut (1965) as César
- $100,000 for Ringo (1965) as Sargento
- Dollar of Fire (1966) as Ericson
- Ruthless Colt of the Gringo (1966) as Halloway
- Who Killed Johnny R.? (1966) as Thorpe
- The Texican (1966) as Bounty Hunter
- Five Dollars for Ringo (1966) as Alex Harris
- Seven Pistols for a Gringo (1966) as Murdoch
- El yankee (1966) as Vice sceriffo
- El primer cuartel (1966) as Juan Ramos
- Gentleman Killer (1967) as Mexican Officer (uncredited)
- Hate for Hate (1967) as Mendez (uncredited)
- Don't Wait, Django... Shoot! (1967) as Navarro (uncredited)
- El terrible de Chicago (1967) as Harrison
- Un colpo da re (1967) as Prof. Von Kassel
- El Baldiri de la costa (1968) as Guardaespatlles (uncredited)
- Chrysanthemums for a Bunch of Swine (1968) as Hutton
- Chico, chica, ¡boom! (1969) as Taxista
- El Puro se sienta, espera y dispara (1969) as 2nd Sheriff
- La banda de los tres crisantemos (1970) as Hutton
- Twenty Paces to Death (1970) as Clegg
- Stagecoach of the Condemned (1970) as Frederick (uncredited)
- Wanted Sabata (1970)
- Four Candles for Garringo (1971) as Empleado de Oswald
- His Name Was Holy Ghost (1972) as Captain at Execution
- La liga no es cosa de hombres (1972) as Padre Faustino
- Watch Out Gringo! Sabata Will Return (1972) as Pistolero de Carrancho
- Fabulous Trinity (1972) as Black Jack
- Now They Call Him Sacramento (1972) as Train Passenger
- Fat Brothers of Trinity (1973) as Socio de Mae (uncredited)
- Even Angels Eat Beans (1973) as Croupier (uncredited)
- The Man with the Severed Head (1973)
- Los Kalatrava contra el imperio del karate (1974) as Zacharias Shoot
- Dallas (1974) as Reverendo
- Las correrías del Vizconde Arnau (1974) as Veterinario
- El precio del aborto (1975) as Doctor Walker
- Las ratas no duermen de noche (1976)
- The Long Holidays of 1936 (1976) as Miliciano
- La ciutat cremada (1976)
- La viuda andaluza (1977)
- Óscar, Kina y el láser (1978) as Tadeo
- Companys, procés a Catalunya (1979) as Centinel·la
- Victòria! La gran aventura d'un poble (1983)
- Victòria! 2: La disbauxa del 17 (1983)
- Victòria! 3: El seny i la rauxa (1984)
- La ràdio folla (1986) as Guàrdia
- Demasiado viejo para morir joven (1989) as Cachalote (final film role)

=== TV series ===
- Novela (1964)
- Escritores en televisión (1969)
- Percy Stuart (1969-1970) as Pfandleiher / Säufer
- Ficciones (1972-1974)
- Original (1975) as Justo
- Teatro Club (1977) as Pascual
- Teatro estudio (1978) as José
- Amor, salut i feina (1987)

== Bibliography ==
- Sánchez Barba, Francesc (2007). Brumas del franquismo: el auge del cine negro español (1950-1965). Edicions Universitat Barcelona. p. 583. ISBN 9788447531745.
- Comas, Àngel (2006). Joan Bosch: el cine i la vida. Cossetània Edicions. p. 190. ISBN 9788497911801.
