= Oklahoma John =

1965 film

- Directed by: Jaime Jesús Balcázar; Roberto Bianchi Montero
- Written by: Alfonso Balcázar; Helmut Harun; Giuseppe Maggi
- Starring: Anton Geesink; José Calvo; Sabine Bethmann
- Cinematography: Giuseppe La Torre
- Edited by: Teresa Alcocer; Enzo Alfonzi; Rosemarie Laudin
- Music by: Francesco De Masi
- Production companies: Balcázar Producciones Cinematográficas; Cinematografica Associati; International Germania Film
- Distributed by: Filmar (Italy); Hermes-Filmverleih (W.Germany)
- Release date: 11 March 1965
- Running time: 81 minutes
- Countries: Italy; Spain; West Germany
- Language: Italian

Oklahoma John also known as Ranch of the Ruthless or The Man from Oklahoma is a 1965 Spanish, German and Italian international co-production western film directed by Jaime Jesús Balcázar and Roberto Bianchi Montero.

== Cast ==
- Richard S. Hornbeck as Oklahoma Dan / John (as Rick Horn)
- Anton Geesink as Thomas Hunter
- José Calvo as Rod Edwards (as Joseph Calvo)
- Sabine Bethmann as Georgina White
- John McDouglas as Ken Hogg
- Tom Felleghy as Watson (as Tom Felleghi)
- Karl-Otto Alberty as Hondo (as Charles Alberty)
- George Herzig as Jim Edwards (as George Herzig)
- Remo De Angelis as Michael
- Antonio Almorós as Cruck
- Carmen Gallen as Dueña del Saloon
- Giovanni Ivan Scratuglia as Randy
- Eduardo Lizarza as Criado

== Bibliography ==
- Hardy, Phil, The Encyclopedia of Western Movies. Octopus, 1983.
