= José Ignacio Abadal =

Spanish actor and voice actor

- Born: Josep Ignasi Abadal; Barcelona
- Died: 3 May 2010; Barcelona
- Occupation: Actor

José Ignacio Abadal (died 3 May 2010) was a Spanish actor.

He played Eduardo in Investigación criminal (1970), Martin LeRoy in La diligencia de los condenados (1970), both directed by Juan Bosch, and Twenty Paces to Death (1970), directed by Manuel Esteba. He played Vidal Gandolfo alongside Oscar Núñez in Nine Queens (2000).

He died on 3 May 2010 in Barcelona.

== Filmography ==
=== Films ===
- Un mal golpe (2011)
- El amor es un suicidio (2009) as Jefe
- 25 Carat (2008) as Padre de Abel
- Quito (2004) as Mendoza
- Nine Queens (2000) as Vidal Gandolfo
- No respires: El amor está en el aire (1999) as Luis
- La sucursal (1995)
- Investigación criminal (1970) as Eduardo
- Stagecoach of the Condemned (1970) as Martin LeRoy
- Hatchet for the Honeymoon (1970) as Jimmy Kane
- Twenty Paces to Death (1970) as Cedric Whitefield
- The Uninhibited (1965)
- Sendas cruzadas (1961)
- Sueños de mujer (1961)

=== Television series ===
- Infidels (2009) as Raimon de Queralt
- Ventdelplà (2007)
- Mar de fons (2006)
- Hospital Central (2005) as Sr. Montero
- Temps de silenci (2001) as Ferran
- Nissaga de poder (1997-1998) as Domènec Fortés / Domènech Tubau
- Estació d'enllaç (1995-1997) as Joan
- I ara què, Xènia? (1993) as Ferran
- Quart segona (1991) as Nacho Vila
- Vindrem a sopar (1990)
- De professió: A.P.I. (1990)
- Crònica negra (1988) as Onofre
- Hora once (1970)
- Teatro catalán (1964-1969)
- Autores invitados (1967) as Arlequin
- Novela (1964)
