= Veinte pasos para la muerte =

1970 film

Twenty Paces to Death
- Film poster
- Veinte pasos para la muerte
- Directed by: Manuel Esteba; Antonio Mollica; José Ulloa
- Written by: Lou Carrigan
- Screenplay by: Ignacio F. Iquino; Guido Leoni; Juliana San José de la Fuente
- Story by: Ignacio F. Iquino
- Starring: Dean Reed; Alberto Farnese; Patty Shepard; Luis Induni; Marta May; Maria Pia Conte; Tony Chandler; César Ojinaga
- Cinematography: Antonio L. Ballesteros; Luciano Trasatti
- Edited by: Francesco Bertuccioli; Manuel Esteba
- Music by: Enrique Escobar
- Production companies: Admiral International Films; I.F.I.S.A.
- Distributed by: I.F.I.S.A.
- Release dates: August 24, 1970 (Spain); April 9, 1970 (Italy)
- Running time: 76 min
- Country: Spain
- Languages: Spanish; Italian
- Box office: 21,778,691€

Twenty Paces to Death (Veinte pasos para la muerte in Spanish) is an Italian-Spanish western film of 1970 directed by Manuel Esteba and starred by: Dean Reed, Alberto Farnese, Patty Shepard, Luis Induni, Marta May, Maria Pia Conte, Tony Chandler and César Ojinaga. It was written by Ignacio F. Iquino and Giuseppe Rosati, composed by Enrique Escobar and edited by Luis Puigvert and Francisco Bertuccioli.

It's produced by the companies "IFI Producción" in Spain and "Admiral International Film" in Italy.

== Cast ==
- Dean Reed as Mestizo
- Alberto Farnese as Aleck Kellaway
- Patty Shepard as Deborah
- Luis Induni
- Maria Pia Conte as Hazel
- Marta May
- Tony Chandler
- César Ojinaga as Clegg
- Alejandro Ulloa
- Gustavo Re as Eugene
- Ignasi Abadal as Cedric Whitefield
- Gaspar Indio González
- Elena Pironti
- Fernando Rubio
- Antonio Molino Rojo
- Ángel Lombarte
- Marta Flores as Sra. Fox
- Alberto Severi
- Fernando de Miragaya
- Miguel Muniesa as Oficial de la Unión
- Lluís Nonell as a Sheriff
- Juan Miguel Solano

== Bibliography ==
- Comas, Àngel (2005). Diccionari de llargmetratges: el cinema a Catalunya durant la Segona República, la Guerra Civil i el franquisme (1930-1975) (in Italian). Cossetània Edicions. p. 303. ISBN 9788497910965.
