= Miguel Muniesa =

Spanish actor

Miguel Muniesa is a Spanish film and theater actor.

He appeared in Companys, proceso a Cataluña (1979), Biotaxia (1968), The Exquisite Cadaver (1969), Ninguno de los tres se llamaba Trinidad (1973), and he played Inspector Robert in Devil's Kiss (1976).

== Filmography ==
- Recordar, peligro de muerte (1986)
- La amante ingenua (1980)
- Companys, procés a Catalunya (1979) as Membre Tribunal
- Cuarenta años sin sexo (1979) as Juez
- Óscar, Kina y el láser (1978) as Pueblerino
- Un papillon sur l'épaule (1978)
- ¿Y ahora qué, señor fiscal? (1977)
- Makarras Conexion (1977)
- La saga de los Rius (1977) as Coronel
- Devil's Kiss (1976) as Inspector Robert
- Las correrías del Vizconde Arnau (1974) as Portero
- Aborto criminal (1973)
- Fat Brothers of Trinity (1973) as Pasajero de carro
- Horror Story (1972)
- A Noose Is Waiting for You Trinity (1972) as Barber
- Fabulous Trinity (1972)
- Seven Murders for Scotland Yard (1972) as Superintendente Chambers
- You Are a Traitor and I'll Kill You! (1972)
- La liga no es cosa de hombres (1972)
- Novela (1969-1971) as Sr. Dantés
- Investigación criminal (1970)
- Topical Spanish (1970)
- Stagecoach of the Condemned (1970) as Judge
- El certificado (1970)
- Twenty Paces to Death (1970) as Oficial de la Unión
- La banda de los tres crisantemos (1970)
- The Exquisite Cadaver (1969) as Empleado Correos
- Percy Stuart (1969) as Präsident Alba
- Biotaxia (1968)
- Dollar of Fire (1966)
- La ruta de los narcóticos (1963)
- Miss Cuplé (1959)
