= Dragon Rapide =

Dragon Rapide may refer to:

- De Havilland Dragon Rapide, 1930s short-haul biplane airliner
- Dragon Rapide (film), 1986 Spanish historical drama film
