= Fernando Rubio =

Mexican actor (1943–2015)

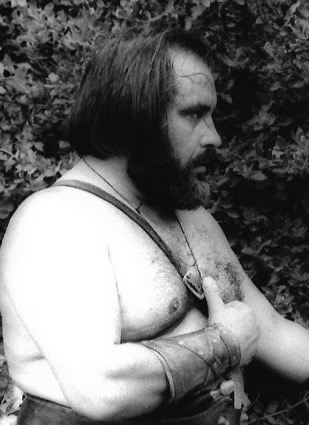
- Fernando Rubio in Pastel de sangre (1971)
- Born: 1943; Mexico
- Died: June 27, 2015 (aged 72); Mexico
- Occupation: Actor

Fernando Rubio (1943 – 27 June 2015) was a Mexican actor who appeared in more than 70 stage plays, 28 soap opera and 8 films. He died on 27 June 2015 at aged 72 from a heart attack and pneumonia.

At the time from his death, he couldn't pay the debts and the health care he need, and he wasn't supported by the Asociación Nacional de Actores where he was partner.

== Filmography ==
=== Films ===
- La distancia entre las cosas (2008)
- A Love to Keep (2006)
- Jews in Space or Why Is this Night Different from All Other Nights? (2005) as Santiago
- Zurdo (2003)
- El transcurso de las cosas (2001)
- Nocturno (2001)
- The Comet (1999) as Maximino
- Dos crímenes (1994) as Licenciado Zorilla
- Anoche soñé contigo (1992) as Papá de Quique
- The Legend of the Mask (1991) as Anibal
- El nacimiento de un guerrillero (1989) as El director
- El fascista, doña Pura y el follón de la escultura (1983)
- Fuga de Ceylán (1982)
- Reborn (1981) as Maria's Father
- La batalla del porro (1981) as Manuel
- La quinta del porro (1981) as Revisor
- ¿Pero no vas a cambiar nunca, Margarita? (1978) as Jorge
- Makarras Conexion (1977) as Antonio
- El pobrecito Draculín (1977) as Petronio
- Sexy... amor y fantasía (1977) as Serafín
- Halt die Luft an alter Gauner - Der Stockfisch und das Stinktier (1976) as Karratorsky
- Amor casi... libre (1976)
- El precio del aborto (1975) as Inspector de policía
- Robin Hood Never Dies (1975)
- Devil's Possessed (1974) as Estebano
- Las correrías del Vizconde Arnau (1974) as Conde Arnau
- I Saw Her First (1974) as Vicente
- Fat Brothers of Trinity (1973) as Bandido barbudo
- Now They Call Him Sacramento (1972) as Sam
- Fabulous Trinity (1972) as Pedrito
- Pastel de sangre (1971) as Marco
- Four Candles for Garringo (1971) as Mulligan
- Dig Your Grave Friend... Sabata's Coming (1971) as Miguel
- Investigación criminal (1970)
- Stagecoach of the Condemned (1970) as Pedro
- Twenty Paces to Death (1970)
- El señorito y las seductoras (1969) as Dependiente de la marisquería
- El Puro se sienta, espera y dispara (1969) as Barman
- Los caballeros de 'La antorcha' (1969)
- Agáchate, que disparan (1969) as Espía
- Elisabet (1968)
- Sartana Does Not Forgive (1968)
- El terrible de Chicago (1967) as Mosca
- Una ladrona para un espía (1967)
- Danger!! Death Ray (1967) as Bearded Henchman
- El primer cuartel (1966) as Zamarra
- Seven Pistols for a Gringo (1966)
- Five Dollars for Ringo (1966) as Coleman
- 07 con el 2 delante (Agente: Jaime Bonet) (1966) as Mac
- Dollar of Fire (1966) as Banker Baker
- Kingdom of the Silver Lion (1966) as Sadek
- Tumba para un forajido (1965) as Ducky el Zurdo
- $100,000 for Ringo (1965)
- Muere una mujer (1965) as Fernández
- That Man in Istanbul (1965)
- Guns of Nevada (1965) as Pete Davy
- Five Thousand Dollars on One Ace (1965) as Fulgencio
- Ranch of the Ruthless (1965) as Mejicano
- La muerte llama otra vez (1964)
- La boda era a las doce (1964) as Pepe
- Piso de soltero (1964)
- Young Sánchez (1964) as Ayudante de Don Rafael
- A tiro limpio (1964) as Encargado del Garaje
- José María (1963)
- La ruta de los narcóticos (1963) as Mario
- Trampa mortal (1963) as Santos
- La gran coartada (1963) as Chófer
- La cuarta ventana (1963) as Trabajador en Club La Pachanga
- Senda torcida (1963) as Camionero
- Dos años de vacaciones (1962)
- La bella Lola (1962) as Policía
- Han matado a un cadáver (1962)
- Los castigadores (1962) as Camarero
- Tierra de todos (1962) as Soldado
- Las estrellas (1961)
- Tu marido nos engaña (1960)
- Altas variedades (1960) as Amigo de Walter
- El casco blanco (1959)
- Charlestón (1959) as Pianista
- Las locuras de Bárbara (1959)
- Ya tenemos coche (1958) as Fotógrafo
- Cita imposible (1958)

=== TV series ===
- Amor Cautivo (2012) as Don Paco
- Entre el amor y el deseo (2010) as Jeronimo
- Secretos del alma (2008) as Olimpo Kuri
- Capadocia (2008) as Arzobispo Primado
- El país de las mujeres (2002)
- La Virgen de Guadalupe (2002) as Fray Juan de Zumarraga
- Runaway Lady (2002)
- Lo Que Callamos Las Mujeres (2001) as Damián
- La vida en el espejo (1999) as Rafael
- La jaula de oro (1997) as Maximino
- En carne propia (1990) as Hans
- Juana Iris (1985) as Néstor
- Por amor (1982)
- Estudio 1 (1982) as Mozo 3
- Lletres catalanes (1978) (as Ferran Rubio)
- Teatro Club (1977) King Kong
- El pícaro (1975) Carcelero
- Crónicas fantásticas (1974) Portero
- Extraño en su pueblo (1973) Inspector
- Ficciones (1973)
- Percy Stuart (1970-1971)
- Hora once (1970)
- Novela (1969) as Inspector de prisiones
- Die Tintenfische (1968)
