= Goodbye, Ninon =

1960 film by José Luis Madrid

- Directed by: José Luis Madrid
- Written by: José Luis Madrid
- Cinematography: Miguel Fernández Mila
- Music by: Juan Solano
- Production company: American Films
- Distributed by: PROCINES
- Release date: 1960
- Country: Spain
- Language: Spanish

Goodbye, Ninon (Spanish: Adiós, Ninón) is a 1960 Spanish film directed by José Luis Madrid.

== Cast ==
- Manuel Arbó
- Mary Esquivel
- Ángel Jordán
- Santiago Rivero
- Tony Soler

== Bibliography ==
- Pascual Cebollada & Luis Rubio Gil. Enciclopedia del cine español: cronología. Ediciones del Serbal, 1996.
