= José Ulloa =

Spanish film director and actor (1934–2026)

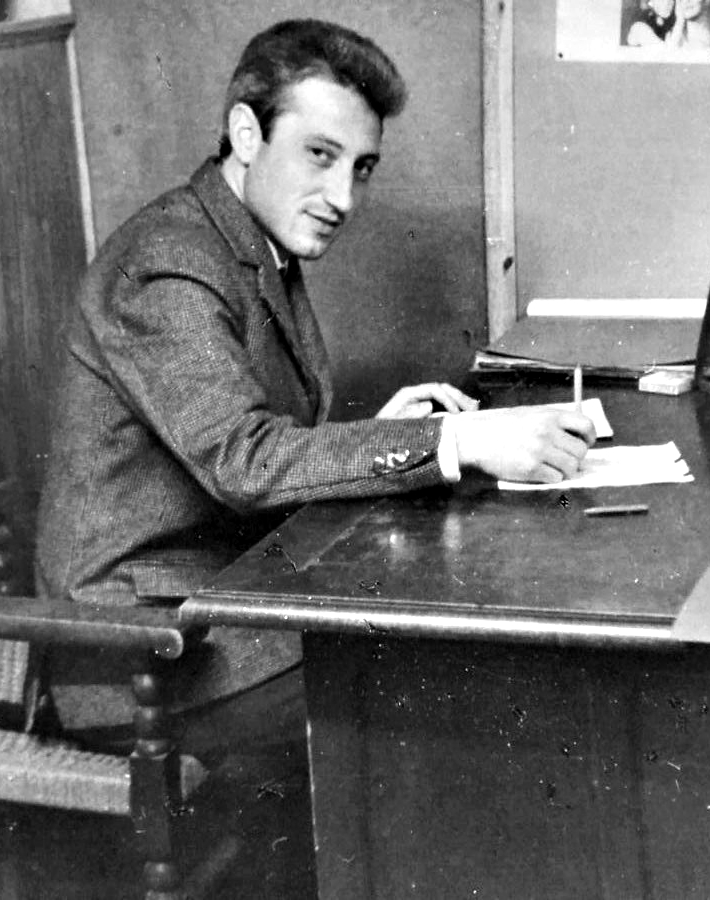
- Born: José Ulloa Blancas; 18 January 1934; Madrid, Spain
- Died: 5 April 2026 (aged 92); Caldes de Montbui, Barcelona, Spain
- Occupations: Film director; screenwriter; actor
- Years active: 1963–1988

José Ulloa Blancas (18 January 1934 – 5 April 2026) was a Spanish film director, screenwriter and actor.

Ulloa is known for directing El refugio del miedo (1974), starring Patty Shepard, a science fiction film in which a matrimony exists in a fallout shelter. With Manuel Vázquez Montalbán he penned Tatuaje (1978). He also directed Juventud sin freno (1978), La amante ingenua (1977), Juventud sin freno (1978), and Andalucía chica (1988).

He wrote the screenplay and was the assistant director of Tu fosa será la exacta... amigo (1972).

Ulloa died in Caldes de Montbui, Barcelona on 5 April 2026, at the age of 92.

== Filmography ==
=== As director ===
- Andalucía chica (1988)
- La amante ingenua (1980)
- Juventud sin freno (1979)
- Creation of the Damned (1974)
- Twenty Paces to Death (1970)

=== As assistant director ===
- Memoria (1976)
- The Killer Wore Gloves (1974)
- Dallas (1974)
- The Killer with a Thousand Eyes (1973)
- They Believed He Was No Saint (1972)
- My Horse, My Gun, Your Widow (1972)
- God in Heaven... Arizona on Earth (1972)
- La liga no es cosa de hombres (1972)
- Four Candles for Garringo (1971)
- And the Crows Will Dig Your Grave (1971)
- Aquel maldito día (1970)
- When Heroes Die (1970)
- Stagecoach of the Condemned (1970)
- Twenty Paces to Death (1970)
- El Puro se sienta, espera y dispara (1969)
- Amor a todo gas (1969)
- Death Knows No Time (1969)
- Tiempos de Chicago (1969)
- La playa de las seducciones (1967)
- El primer cuartel (1966)
- Seven Pistols for a Gringo (1966)
- Five Dollars for Ringo (1966)
- Guns of Nevada (1965)
- Un rincón para querernos (1964)
- Llegar a más (1963)

=== As writer ===
- Andalucía chica (1988)
- La amante ingenua (1980)
- Tatuaje (1978)
- Creation of the Damned (1974)
- La alternativa (1963)

=== As actor ===
- El hijo del hombre perseguido por un O.V.N.I. (2019) as Militar
- Adela (1987)
- El sistema de Robert Hein (1986)
- ¡Viva la Pepa! (1981)

== Bibliography ==
- Comas, Àngel (2003). Diccionari de llargmetratges: el cinema a Catalunnya després del franquisme, 1975-2003. Cossetània Edicions. p. 303. ISBN 9788496035966.
