= José Lifante =

Spanish actor (1943–2024)

- Born: 3 June 1943; Barcelona, Catalonia, Spain
- Died: 16 January 2024 (aged 80); Madrid, Spain
- Other name: José Ruiz Lifante
- Occupation: Actor
- Years active: 1961–2024

José Lifante (3 June 1943 – 16 January 2024) was a Spanish stage, film and television actor.

Lifante died from a blood clot in Madrid on 16 January 2024, at the age of 80.

== Biography ==
With a degree in Philosophy and Literature, specializing in Art History, he made his acting debut in 1960 with Enrique Diosdado and Amelia de la Torre's theater company in Barcelona.

Just one year later, he made his first film appearance alongside Francisco Rovira Beleta in the movie Los atracadores. That same year, he filmed Juventud a la intemperie by Ignacio F. Iquino, and then stepped away from filmmaking for the next nine years after receiving no offers.

During this time, he devoted his career to theater, performing, for example, El adefesio (1966) by Rafael Alberti. In 1974, he moved to Madrid and resumed his film career, which would eventually exceed 100 titles. He is therefore one of the Spanish actors with the most extensive filmography, almost always in supporting roles and conditioned by his tall, lean physique, particularly suited to the comedy genre. Highlights of his career include the character of the butler in Luis García Berlanga film National Heritage (film)(1981) and his performance in Jordi Grau's horror film No profanar el sueño de los muertos (1974), playing one of the zombies.

He has also played dozens of supporting roles in comedy series on television, with forays into drama, such as in El pícaro (1974), Lecciones de tocador (1983), Teresa de Jesús (1984), Media naranja (1986), Villarriba y Villabajo (1994), Hermanos de leche (1994-1995), Abierto 24 horas (2000-2001), Aquí no hay quien viva,La que se avecina and Cuéntame cómo pasó.

In the early 1990s, he also worked as a voice actor at Arcofón studios in Madrid. He participated in series such as Columbo and the animated series Saint Seiya, where he played many characters, but his voice is most closely associated with the evil character Cancer's Death Mask and the noble Leo's Aioria.

In 2011, he embarked on a new project, an online horror series entitled Cementerio de historias (Graveyard of Stories), in which he plays the role of “El Enterrador” (The Gravedigger), a mysterious character who narrates a different story in each episode, ranging from gore and black humor to thriller and suspense, each one completely independent of the others.

José Lifante died on the morning of January 16, 2024, at seven o'clock in the morning, due to Thrombosis.

== Selected filmography ==
- Spanish Fly (1975) as Pedro
- Tobi (1978) as Marga's friend
- Butterfly on the Shoulder (1978) as The Commissioner
- National Heritage (1981) as Goyo
- Panic (1982) as Sergeant O'Brien
- Dragon Rapide (1986) as Camarero
- Beaks: The Movie (1987) as Governor
- The Long Winter (1992)
- The Dog in the Manger (1996) as Octavio
- Lázaro de Tormes (2001) as Clérigo
- Dagon (2001) as Hotel receptionist
- La conjura de El Escorial (2008)

== Bibliography ==
- Harris M. Lentz. Science Fiction, Horror & Fantasy Film and Television Credits: Filmography. McFarland, 2001.
