= Admiral International Films =

Italian film studio

Admiral International Films was an Italian film studio set in Rome and whose director was Mario Maggi. It produced Veinte pasos para la muerte (1970), by Manuel Esteba, and Aquel maldito día (1971).

== Filmography ==
- La banda de los tres crisantemos (1970)
- Aquel maldito día (1970)
- Twenty Paces to Death (1970)
- Ore di terrore (1971)
