= I.O.B. Spezialauftrag =

- Also known as: I.O.B. – Special Mission
- Created by: Rainer Horbelt; Ulrich Stark; Herbert Lichtenfeld; Arne Elsholtz
- Starring: Claus Wilcke; Hans Wyprächtiger; Gerlinde Doeberl; Karin Eckhold
- Theme music composer: Siegfried Franz
- Country of origin: Germany
- No. of series: 2
- No. of episodes: 26

Production
- Producer: Hamburgische Film- und Fernsehproduktion Schlüter/Lockau
- Running time: 25 minutes

Original release
- Network: ZDF
- Release: 10 March 1980

I.O.B. Spezialauftrag' (I.O.B. Special Mission) was a German crime television series after Percy Stuart and Sergeant Berry that featured an American hero.

== Premise ==
Mike Jackson is an American of German origin and was an FBI agent. Now he is the best agent of an international detective agency and works in particular for their location in Hamburg. The equipment of his Porsche included already in 1981 a video telephone. Occasionally a young Austrian lady from Vienna assists him.

== Reception ==
The series was not as successful as "Percy Stuart". It had been produced by the same company, Claus Wilcke was again the star and there were also guest stars such as Iris Berben, but FBI agents weren't any longer as popular in Germany as they had been at the time of the first wave of Jerry Cotton films with George Nader. Also Elvis Presley hadn't made and feature films for a long time and subsequently German spectators were certainly less impressed by the fact that Claus Wilcke had dubbed him. However, there were no re-runs and neither has the series been released on DVD yet.
