= The Return of Clint the Stranger =

1972 film

The Return of Clint the Stranger (aka There's a Noose Waiting for You...Trinity!)
- Directed by: Alfonso Balcázar
- Written by: Enzo Doria; Giovanni Simonelli
- Produced by: Enzo Doria
- Starring: Klaus Kinski
- Cinematography: Jaime Deu Casas
- Edited by: Teresa Alcocer
- Music by: Ennio Morricone
- Release date: 14 December 1972
- Running time: 90 minutes
- Countries: Italy; Spain
- Language: Spanish

The Return of Clint the Stranger (aka There's a Noose Waiting for You Trinity!, Italian: Il ritorno di Clint il solitario, Spanish: El retorno de Clint el solitario) is a 1972 Italian-Spanish Western film directed by Alfonso Balcázar and starring Klaus Kinski. The film is a sequel to Clint the Stranger.

== Plot ==
Trinity is a former gunslinger desperate to be forgiven by his family that he abandoned years ago. A ruthless bounty hunter tracks down Trinity and forces him to return to his criminal ways to protect himself and his family.

== Cast ==
- George Martin as Clint Murrayson
- Marina Malfatti as Norma Murrayson
- Klaus Kinski as Scott
- Daniel Martín as Slim
- Augusto Pescarini as Jimmy Murrayson
- Francisco José Huetos as Mr Scranton
- Susanna Atkinson as Betty Murrayson (as Billy)
- Willi Colombini as (as Willy Colombini)
- Luis Ponciado as Brandon
- Gaspar 'Indio' González as Sheriff Culver (as Indio González)
- Manuel Muñiz as Telegrapher (as Pajarito)
- Manuel Sas as Bill McKinley
- Manuel Bronchud as Slim's Right Hand
- Ricardo Moyán
- Gustavo Re as Blinky
- Adolfo Alises as Mr. Thompson
- Miguel Muniesa as Ben
- Vittorio Fanfoni as Murdoch brother
- Luigi Antonio Guerra as Murdoch brother
