= Eleven Pairs of Boots =

- Directed by: Francisco Rovira Beleta
- Written by: Vicente Coello; Manuel María Saló; Luis Trías de Bes
- Produced by: Alfonso Balcázar
- Cinematography: Salvador Torres Garriga
- Edited by: Albert Gasset Nicolau; Antonio Isasi-Isasmendi
- Music by: Joan Dotras i Vila
- Production company: Balcázar Producciones Cinematográficas
- Distributed by: CIFESA
- Release date: 6 September 1954
- Running time: 106 minutes
- Country: Spain
- Language: Spanish

Eleven Pairs of Boots (Spanish: Once pares de botas) is a 1954 Spanish comedy sports film directed by Francisco Rovira Beleta and starring José Suárez, Mari Carmen Pardo and Elisa Montés.

== Plot ==
Laura, the daughter of the director of Club Deportivo Hispania, manages to sign the promising player Ariza, who comes from the little town of Valmoral de la Sierra. The spark arises between them but Laura has another suitor, the player Mario Valero.

Valero, full of jealousy, allows himself to be bribed to make his team lose. Ariza discovers his plans and can think of no better solution to avoid defeat than to injure Valero.

Ariza is left as a savage, everyone turns their back on him and he has to leave the team, but finally the truth is discovered and he is rehabilitated.

== Cast ==
- José Suárez as Ignacio Ariza
- Mari Carmen Pardo as Laura López Salgado
- Elisa Montés as Esther
- José Isbert as Padre Roque
- Manolo Morán as Ernesto
- Mary Santpere as Camarera
- Javier Armet as Mario Valero
- Jesús Colomer
- Josep Maria Angelat as Enrique
- Francisco Javier Marcet as himself
- Antonio Ramallets as Deusto
- Mariano Martín
- Aldecoa as Aldecoa, soccer player
- José Samitier as Secretario técnico
- Fernando Vallejo as López Salgado
- Félix de Pomés as Quijano
- Enrique Aycart as Presidente del Hispania
- María Victoria Durá as Ana
- Carlos Ronda
- Ramón Vaccaro as Julián Ruiz
- José Ramón Giner as Hombrecillo
- Salvador Muñoz
- Mariano Pombo
- Luis Parellada
- Eduardo Berraondo
- Jorge Morales
- Juan Monfort
- Enrique Martí
- Enrique Tusquets
- Matías Prats as Announcer
- Miguel Ángel Valdivieso as Announcer
- Federico Gallo as Announcer
- Manuel Cano as Announcer
- Gabriel Alonso as soccer player
- Gustavo Biosca as Soccer player
- Campanal as soccer player
- Alfredo Di Stéfano as soccer player
- Fernández as soccer player
- Agustín Gainza as soccer player
- Ipiña as soccer player
- Enrique Lesmes as soccer player
- Miguel as soccer player
- Luis Molowny as soccer player
- Miguel Muñoz as soccer player
- Navarro as soccer player
- Roque Olsen as soccer player
- Pasieguito as soccer player
- Antonio Puchades as soccer player
- Jacinto Quincoces as soccer player
- José Segarra as soccer player
- Ricardo Teruel as soccer player
- Venancio as soccer player
- Telmo Zarra as soccer player
- Núria Espert
- Emilio Fábregas as López Salgado (voice)
- Rosa Guiñón as Esther (voice)
- Juan Ibáñez as Secretario técnico (voice)
- Carmen Lombarte as Laura López Salgado (voice)
- Tete Montoliu as himself
- César Ojinaga
- Felip Peña as Aldecoa (voice)
- Alfonso Santigosa as Deusto (voice)
- Juan Manuel Soriano as Lasky (voice)

== Bibliography ==
- Bentley, Bernard. A Companion to Spanish Cinema. Boydell & Brewer 2008.
