= Doomed Fort =

1965 film by José María Elorrieta

Fuerte perdido
- Theatrical release poster
- Directed by: José María Elorrieta
- Screenplay by: José María Elorrieta; José Luis Navarro
- Story by: José María Elorrieta; José Luis Navarro
- Starring: Germán Cobos; Marta May; Mariano Vidal; Ethel Rojo; José Guardiola
- Cinematography: Pablo Ripoll; Paul Ripoll
- Edited by: Antonio Gimeno
- Music by: Fernando García Morcillo
- Production company: P.C. Alesanco
- Distributed by: AVCO Embassy Television; Alianza Cinematográfica Española; Gema Films
- Release date: 31 May 1965 (Madrid)
- Running time: 95 minutes
- Country: Spain

Fuerte perdido or Asalto a fuerte apache (transl. Massacre at Fort Perdition) is a 1965 Spanish western film directed by José María Elorrieta and starred by Germán Cobos, Mariano Vidal and Marta May. The story was written by Fred Uratia.

== Cast ==
- Germán Cobos as Paul Driscoll
- Mariano Vidal Molina as Joffren
- Aldo Sambrell as James
- Luis Villar as Juez de Paz
- Cris Huerta as Arthur
- Frank Braña as John
- Rafael Albaicín as Apache
- Román Ariznavarreta as Militar
- Luis Barboo
- Ángel Celdrán
- José Luis Chinchilla as citizen
- José Guardiola
- Javier Inglés
- Rufino Inglés as Juez militar
- Ana Lazaga as Bailarina
- Marta May
- Guillermo Méndez as Capitan Nixon
- Ángel Ortiz
- Hugo Pimentel as Sargento Grey
- Julio Pérez Tabernero as Union Lieutenant
- Santiago Rivero as Fiscal
- Ethel Rojo as Tabaly
- Rosario Royo as Tendera
- María Saavedra as Julie
- José Sancho
- Pastor Serrador
- John Sullivan
- Vicente Tormos
- Manuel Torremocha

== Bibliography ==
- Goble, Alan (8 September 2011). The Complete Index to Literary Sources in Film. Walter de Gruyter. p. 1039. ISBN 9783110951943.
