= 100.000 dollari per Ringo =

1965 film by Alberto De Martino

100.000 Dollari per Ringo
- Theatrical release poster
- Directed by: Alberto De Martino
- Screenplay by: Alberto De Martino; Giovanni Simonelli; Vincenzo Flamini; Alfonso Balcázar
- Story by: Alberto De Martino; Giovanni Simonelli; Vincenzo Flamini; Alfonso Balcazar
- Cinematography: Federico Gutierrez Larraya
- Edited by: Teresa Alcocer
- Music by: Bruno Nicolai
- Production companies: Fida Cinematografica di Amati Edmondo; P.C. Balcázar, Barcelona
- Distributed by: Fida Cinematografica
- Release dates: November 1965 (Italy); July 1966 (Spain)
- Countries: Italy; Spain

100.000 dollari per Ringo (or Centomilla dollari per Ringo) is a 1965 spaghetti Western film directed by Alberto De Martino.

It was shown as part of a retrospective on Spaghetti Western at the 64th Venice International Film Festival.

== Plot ==
Lee Barton arrives in Rainbow Valley as a stranger. The townspeople mistake him for Ward Cluster, a former resident thought to have died in the Civil War. They believe Barton has come to seek revenge against the Cherry brothers, who are responsible for the death of his wife. Even Cluster's son, Sean, raised by an Indian chief named Gray Bear, thinks Barton is his father.

Tom Cherry, the most troublesome of the three brothers, is involved in dealings with the Mexican army. He is romantically interested in Deborah, a local woman married to Ive, a local drunk with a questionable reputation.

Tom is on a quest for $100,000 hidden by a Mexican general. At one point, he captures and whips Barton. Eventually, Tom kills both Deborah and Ive.

Barton teams up with a wandering sheriff from Tucson and, in a final shoot-out, kills Tom. Barton discovers the hidden money and envisions a future with Sean.

== Cast ==
- Richard Harrison as Lee 'Ringo' Barton
- Fernando Sancho as Chuck
- Luis Induni as Sheriff
- Gérard Tichy as Tom Sherry
- John Barracuda
- Aurora Julia
- Eleonora Bianchi as Deborah
- Loris Loddi as Sean (the boy)
- Lee Burton as Luke Sherry
- Michel Montfort
- Paco Sanz as Jose
- Tomás Torres as General mejicano (Mexican general)
- Rafael Albaicín as Oso gris (gray bear)
- César Ojinaga as Sargento (sergeant)
- Frank Oliveras as Indio (Indian)
- Pedro Rodríguez de Quevedo
- Fernando Rubio
- Víctor Vilanova

== Release ==
100.000 dollari per Ringo was released in Italy in November 1965 and in Spain in July 1966. Thomas Weisser commented that the film was relatively unknown in the United States, but that the film was one of Richard Harrison's greatest international box office hits.

== Box office ==
The film was one of the most successful Spaghetti Westerns of 1965, being one of only six to gross more than 1,236,276,000 Lira that year; and is the 32nd highest grossing of all time.

== See also ==
- List of Italian films of 1965
