= Cliff Dexter =

1966 West German TV series

- Starring: Hans von Borsody; Andrea Dahmen; Sabine Bethmann
- Country of origin: West Germany
- No. of seasons: 2
- No. of episodes: 26

Production
- Running time: 25 minutes
- Production company: Hamburgische Film- und Fernsehproduktion

Original release
- Network: ZDF
- Release: 19 October 1966 – 7 February 1968

Cliff Dexter is a West German detective series which aired on ZDF 1966 until 1968. It produced two seasons, each with thirteen twenty-five minutes episodes. The lead actor was Hans von Borsody. Other performers included Hans Schellbach as Commissioner Meinert, Sabine Bethmann as Jacqueline and Andrea Dahmen as Carrol. Günter Strack appeared on two episodes.

Cliff Dexter is a former FBI agent who works as a private investigator in a German city. Parts of the series were filmed in Hamburg, including the startup sequence, which saw Dexter running in his Mercedes Benz 300 SE convertible to his office, which was located at Ludwig-Erhard-Straße 22, 20459 Hamburg. (formerly the Ost-West Straße)

The series was not continued after twenty-six episodes, although it was popular with the audience. The probable reason was partly due critics having little good to say about the 'pocket-format Bond'. During the broadcast period, the series regularly reached thirty-six to thirty-eight million viewers.

== Main cast ==
- Hans von Borsody as Cliff Dexter (26 episodes)
- Andrea Dahmen as Carroll (13 episodes)
- Sabine Bethmann as Jacqueline (13 episodes)
- Eva Gross as Empfangssekretärin (13 episodes)
- Hansi Waldherr as Bob (13 episodes)
- Hans Schellbach as Kommissar Meinert (12 episodes)
- Herbert F. Schubert as Paul (12 episodes)
- Hans Irle as Archibald Pillow (10 episodes)
- Achim Thorwald as Kriminalist Marquard (6 episodes)

== See also ==
- List of German television series
