= George Martin (Spanish actor) =

Spanish actor (1937–2021)

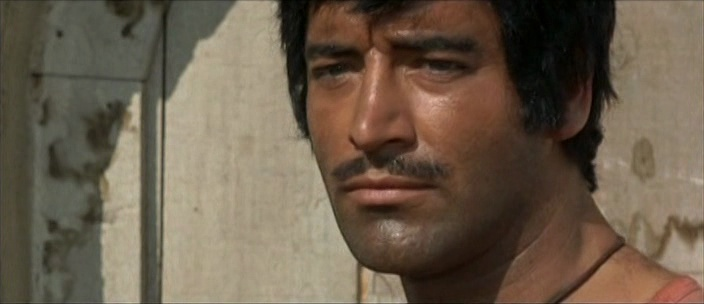
- George Martin in Red Blood, Yellow Gold (1967)
- Born: Francisco Martínez Celeiro; September 18, 1937; Barcelona, Catalonia, Spain
- Died: September 1, 2021 (aged 83); Miami, Florida, United States
- Occupation: Actor

George Martin (born Francisco Martínez Celeiro; September 18, 1937 – September 1, 2021) was a Spanish film actor, sometimes credited as Jorge Martín. He is known as a frequent star in the Italian 3 Supermen series and for numerous parts in spaghetti Westerns and Italian genre films.

== Death ==
Martin died in Miami, Florida on September 1, 2021, at the age of 83. The death occurred due to a heart attack caused by kidney failure derived from stomach constipation, after his health had been suffering in recent months since he became infected with COVID-1.

== Awards and nominations ==
Association	Year	Category	Result	Ref.
Almería Western Film Festival	2017	Premio Tabernas de Ciné (career award)	Won	

== Partial filmography ==
- Nunca es demasiado tarde (1956) - Ricardo
- Il conquistatore di Maracaibo (1961) - Auction Customer (uncredited)
- The Invincible Gladiator (1961) - Gladiator
- Horizontes de luz (1962) - Carlos Valverde
- Escuela de seductoras (1962)
- Commando (1962)
- As Motorizadas (1962) - (uncredited)
- El diablo en vacaciones (1963) - Manolo
- Los conquistadores del Pacífico (1963)
- Cuatro bodas y pico (1963) - Miguel
- Gibraltar (1964)
- Apache Fury (1964) - Elmer Roscoe
- Fuera de la ley (1964) - Billy Carter
- Texas Ranger (1964) - Sgt. Bob Logan
- Grave of the Gunfighter (1964) - Tom Bogarde
- A Pistol for Ringo (1965) - Sheriff Ben
- Guns of Nevada (1965) - Joe Dexter 'Nevada Joe'
- Canadian Wilderness (1965) - Victor DeFrois
- The Return of Ringo (1965) - Don Fernando Paco Fuentes
- Kiss Kiss...Bang Bang (1966) - Chico Pérez
- Per il gusto di uccidere (1966) - Gus Kennebeck
- Thompson 1880 (1966) - 'Ray' Raymond Alec Thompso
- Clint the Stranger (1967) - Clint Harrison
- Maneater of Hydra (1967) - David Moss
- Electra One (1967) - Gary
- Red Blood, Yellow Gold (1967) - Fidel Ramirez
- 15 Scaffolds for a Murderer (1967) - Sandy Cassel
- Psychopath (1968) - Alan, 'Sigpress'
- 3 Supermen a Tokyo (1968) - Teniente Martin
- Sartana Does Not Forgive (1968) - Sartana
- Three Supermen in the Jungle (1970) - Martin
- The Magnificent Robin Hood (1970) - Robin Hood
- Blackie the Pirate (1971) - Pedro
- Let's Go and Kill Sartana (1971) - Nebraska Clay
- Watch Out Gringo! Sabata Will Return (1972) - Rayo
- Escalofrío diabólico (1972) - Clyde
- The Return of Clint the Stranger (1972) - Clint Murrayson
- Death Carries a Cane (1973) - Inspector Merughi
- Three Supermen of the West (1973) - George
- Los hijos de Scaramouche (1975) - George (final film role)
