= La banda de los tres crisantemos =

1970 film directed by Ignacio F. Iquino

- Directed by: Ignacio F. Iquino
- Screenplay by: Ignacio F. Iquino; Juliana San José de la Fuente; Ernesto Gastaldi
- Story by: Ignacio F. Iquino; Juliana San José de la Fuente
- Based on: novel by Lou Carrigan
- Produced by: Ignacio F. Iquino
- Cinematography: Antonio L. Ballesteros
- Edited by: Luis Puigvert
- Music by: Enrique Escobar
- Production companies: IFI Producción S.A.; Admiral International Films
- Distributed by: Ignacio Ferrés Iquino; Sunfilm Entertainment
- Release date: 6 January 1970 (Valencia)
- Running time: 86 min
- Country: Spain

La banda de los tres crisantemos is a 1970 crime film directed by Ignacio F. Iquino, written by Lou Carrigan and Ernesto Gastaldi and starring Dean Reed, Daniel Martín and Fernando Sancho.

== Cast ==
- Dean Reed as Owen Olinger
- Danny Martin as Frank Olinger
- Fernando Sancho as Burton
- Krista Nell as Marilyn
- María Martín as Catherine Olinger
- Alice Sandro as Mary
- Paolo La Porta
- Ángel del Pozo as Police Agent John Williams
- Paola Barbara
- Malisa Longo
- Franco Marletta
- Luis Duque as Cliff Olinger
- Ramón Durán as Sheriff Olinger
- Jarque Zurbano as Policía
- Esteban Dalmases as Cajero
- Daniel Medrán as Chico en iglesia
- Lina Canalejas as Margot
- Juan Fernández as Telegrafista
- Manuel Gas
- Gaspar 'Indio' González
- Miguel Muniesa
- César Ojinaga as Hutton
- Adrián Ortega
- Luis del Pueblo
- Gustavo Re
- Mary Santpere as Dorothy
