= Electra One =

- Directed by: Alfonso Balcázar
- Written by: José Antonio de la Loma; Giovanni Simonelli; Alfonso Balcazar
- Starring: George Martin; Vivi Bach
- Cinematography: Victor Monreal
- Music by: Claude Bolling
- Release date: 1967
- Countries: Spain; Italy; France
- Language: Italian

Electra One (Spanish: Con la muerte a la espalda, Italian: Con la morte alle spalle, French: Typhon sur Hambourg, also known as With Death on Your Back) is a 1967 Spanish-Italian-French Eurospy film directed by Alfonso Balcázar and starring George Martin. It was originally shot in an experimental 70mm 3D filming technique.

== Cast ==
- George Martin as Gary
- Vivi Bach as Monica
- Klausjürgen Wussow as Klaus
- Daniele Vargas as Electra 1
- Rosalba Neri as Silvana
- Michael Montfort as Bill
- Ignazio Leone as Ivan
- Georges Chamarat as Prof. Roland
- Maria Badmayew as Madame Van Hallen
