= Watch Out Gringo! Sabata Will Return =

1972 film by Alfonso Balcázar and José Ramón Larraz

- Film poster
- Spanish: Judas... ¡toma tus monedas!
- Directed by: Alfonso Balcázar; Pedro L. Ramirez
- Screenplay by: Alfonso Balcázar; José Ramón Larraz; Giovanni Simonelli
- Story by: Alfonso Balcázar
- Produced by: Alfonso Balcázar
- Starring: George Martin; Vittorio E. Richelmy; Fernando Sancho; Rosalba Neri; Daniel Martín
- Cinematography: Jaime Deu Casas
- Edited by: Teresa Alcocer
- Music by: Piero Piccioni
- Production companies: Producciones Balcázar S.A.; Empire Films
- Distributed by: Fida Cinematografica; Filmax
- Release date: 4 June 1972 (Italy)
- Running time: 87 min
- Country: Spain

Watch Out Gringo! Sabata Will Return (Spanish: Judas... ¡toma tus monedas!) is a 1972 Spanish western film directed by Alfonso Balcázar and Pedro Luis Ramírez, scored by Piero Piccioni and starring Vittorio Richelmy, George Martin and Fernando Sancho. Produced by Balcázar Producciones Cinematográficas and Empire Films, it is an unofficial sequel to Sabata.

== Cast ==
- George Martin as Rayo
- Fernando Sancho as Carrancho
- Vittorio E. Richelmy as Texas
- Rosalba Neri as Kidnapped Girl
- Daniel Martín as Luke Morton / Luck Morgan
- Luciano Rossi as Imprisoned Bandit
- Manuel Gas as Saloon Owner
- Oswaldo Genazani as Mormon Leader
- Manuel Muñiz as Peter, Undertaker
- César Ojinaga as Pistolero de Carrancho
- Jhonny Fairen as Pistolero
- Manuel Bronchud as Gold Guard
- José Palomo as Store Owner
