= Sylter Geschichten =

German television series

- Starring: Claus Wilcke
- Country of origin: Germany

Sylter Geschichten is a German television series.

== See also ==
- List of German television series
