= Seven Murders for Scotland Yard =

- Directed by: José Luis Madrid
- Written by: José Luis Madrid; Paul Naschy; Tito Carpi
- Produced by: Edmundo Amati; Intl. Apollo; Cinefilms
- Starring: Paul Naschy; Patricia Loran; Renzo Marignano; Orchidea De Santis; Andres Resino; Irene Mir
- Cinematography: Diego Úbeda
- Edited by: Luis Puigvert
- Music by: Piero Piccioni
- Production companies: Cinefilms; International Apollo Films
- Distributed by: DICINSA
- Release dates: 1971 (Italy); 1976 (U.S.)
- Running time: 87 minutes
- Countries: Italy; Spain
- Language: Spanish

Seven Murders for Scotland Yard (Spanish: Jack el destripador de Londres / Jack the Ripper of London) is a 1971 Italian-Spanish giallo film directed by José Luis Madrid and starring Paul Naschy, Patricia Loran and Renzo Marignano. Naschy and Madrid wrote the screenplay, Tito Carpi's name was simply added to the credits to satisfy the requirements for a Spanish-Italian co-production. The film was shot in June 1971, and was first released in Italy in 1971 as Sette Cadaveri per Scotland Yard / Seven Corpses for Scotland Yard. It was shown in Spain on July 10, 1972, as Jack el destripador de Londres, and finally wound up theatrically released in the U.S. in 1976 as Seven Murders for Scotland Yard. The Mexican one-sheet poster simply called the film Jack el distripador/ Jack the Ripper.

== Plot ==
Paul Naschy plays Bruno Doriani, an ex-acrobat living in London who limps badly as a result of an accident he suffered years before on the trapeze. Bruno's life has slid downhill, and he hangs out in seedy pubs and dates tarts and prostitutes. When a number of call girls begin turning up brutally murdered, the police led by Inspector Campbell seek to uncover the identity of the mad slasher, whom they nickname Jack the Ripper after the notorious serial killer from the late 1800s. Paul becomes a suspect in the eyes of the police, as he had personal connections to one or two of the victims. The killer turns out to be the killer's assistant Wilson, as the Inspector and Bruno discover when they enter his underground dungeon of horrors where he keeps certain body parts from his victims in jars as mementos. But the mystery of this film is not simply who the killer is, but rather why he is performing these hideous murders: He is impotent, and killing the women and keeping parts of them was the only way he could "possess" them. In the end, the murderer is stabbed by Bruno.

== Cast ==
- Paul Naschy as Bruno Doriani
- Patricia Loran as Lulu
- Renzo Marignano as Inspector Henry Campbell
- Orchidea De Santis as Sandy Christian
- Andrés Resino as Winston Darby Christian
- Irene Mir as Belinda
- Franco Borelli as Detective Hawkins
- Víctor Iregua
- Teresita Castizio
- Carmen Roger as Violeta
- Palomba Moreno as Ms. Sanders
- Víctor Vilanova as McMurdo
- Marina Ferri as Diana (credited as Maika)
- Miguel Muniesa as Superintendent Chambers
- Isidro Novellas as The Bartender
- Alfonso Castizo as Robert
- Antonio Ramis as Doctor At Crime Scene
- Enrique Beltrán

== Critiques ==
Film historian Troy Howarth opines that although the film's murders are presented in a lurid manner, the bulk of the film is directed by Merino in a lackluster manner, which undercuts Naschy's interesting script. Also he felt too much screen time was allotted to police procedure and not enough to Naschy. He did find that the score by Piero Piccioni added to the film's suspense.

== Bibliography ==
- Antonio Lazaro-Reboll. Spanish Horror Film. Edinburgh University Press, 2012.
