= Antonio Vera Ramírez =

Antonio Vera Ramírez (2 July 1934 – 29 July 2024) was a Spanish author who wrote about factual scientific subjects, but in various fictional styles, such as mystery, crime and romance, well-known as Lou Carrigan, he also wrote under the pseudonyms Angelo Antonioni, Crowley Farber, Lou Flanagan, Anthony Hamilton, Sol Harrison, Anthony Michaels, Anthony W. Rawer, Angela Windsor and Giselle.

== Life and career ==
Vera Ramírez was born in Barcelona on 2 July 1934. He married Pepita Rodero Forga in 1958 and started to write. He used pulp fiction and Anglicized words in his books, such as Moderno diccionario ilustrado de la lengua castellana, Adios, good-bye, sayonara, Poderes Ocultos de Los Seres Superiores and Jardín siniestro He wrote over 25 books, and also worked with Adriano Bolzoni to complete "No importa morir" in 1969. Vera Ramírez died on 29 July 2024, at the age of 90.

== Filmography ==
- Four Candles for Garringo (1971)
- And the Crows Will Dig Your Grave (1971)
- Stagecoach of the Condemned (1970)
- Twenty Paces to Death (1970)
- La banda de los tres crisantemos (1970)
- Bridge Over the Elbe (1969)
- Estudio 3 (1965)

== Bibliography ==
=== As Antonio Vera Ramírez ===
==== Non-fiction ====
- ¿Qué es el Opus Dei? (1993)
- Pregúntale a Lao Tse (1997)
- Pregúntale a Mahoma (1997)
- Pregúntale a Confucio (1998)
