= Butler Parker =

- Genre: Adventure
- Created by: Günter Dönges
- Starring: Dirk Dautzenberg; Eckart Dux; Carl Schell; Edgar Hoppe; Stella Mooney; Gaby Dohm
- Theme music composer: Dieter Reith
- Opening theme: Dieter Reith
- Composer: Dieter Reith
- Country of origin: Germany
- Original language: German
- No. of seasons: 2
- No. of episodes: 26

Production
- Camera setup: Ulrich Burtin; Siegfried Blohm; Helmut Stoll; Adalbert Plica
- Production company: Südwestfunk (SWF)

Original release
- Network: ARD
- Release: 4 July 1972 – 16 January 1973

Butler Parker is a fictitious British character who was, despite his ostentatious Britishness, created by a German pulp fiction author and became eventually the protagonist of a German television series.

== Author ==
Butler Parker was the brainchild of the author Günther Dönges (1923–August 2001), who often used Anglo-Saxon aliases, due to the widespread opinion that only Anglo-Saxons could write entertaining good crime stories in West Germany.

== Protagonist ==
Butler Joshua Parker worked for different employers who would leave him a lot of freedom. However, Butler Parker would always be the main character who cracked the cases and sometimes protected or even rescued his employers. He had a steel-strengthened bowler hat and his umbrella could be used to shoot arrows. Moreover, he drove a classic London taxi which was equipped with a variety of gadgets.

== Novels ==
Like Jerry Cotton, Joshua Parker had an obviously English name and drove an English car. (Although Parker had a traditional London taxi, jam-packed with amazing gadgets instead of a Jaguar E-Type) Both heroes had their first appearances in publications of the publishing house Bastei. But eventually, Günter Dönges changed the publisher, and took "Butler Parker" with him. Between 1953 and 1992, more than 600 novels were released by Bastei, Pabel and later on by Zauberkreis. In the beginning, Butler Parker was in the service of an old lady, but later on, he had an American boss called Mike Rander. The television shows him working for Mike Rander (Eckart Dux).

== Television show ==
Since the novels about Butler Parker were very successful and another fictitious British pulp fiction hero (Percy Stuart) had already been adapted for the television screen with success, the idea of a television series about Butler Parker seemed to suggest itself. But it lasted only for twenty-six shows. Still the short life of his television presence didn't diminish the ongoing success of the novels.

№	Title	Air date
1	"Hallo Taxi" (Taxi!)	4 July 1972
Guest stars: Arthur Brauss, Klaus Abramowsky
2	"Besuch in Schottland" (Visiting Scotland)	11 July 1972
Guest stars: Frederick Jäger, Gerard Heinz, Klaus Dahlen
3	"Geschäft mit der Angst" (Fear is their business)	18 July 1972
Guest stars: Victor Beaumont, Benno Hoffmann
4	"Zwischenfall in Brighton" (Incident in Brighton)	25 July 1972
Guest stars: Til Erwig, Josef Fröhlich
5	"Der Kredithai" (The loan shark)	1 August 1972
Guest stars: Hans Schellbach, Hubert Mittendorf
6	"Patientin gesucht" (Wanted: Patient, female)	8 August 1972
Guest stars: Verena Buss, Else Brückner
7	"Besuch im Starclub" (Visiting the Starclub)	15 August 1972
Guest stars: Betty Dorsey, Rainer Basedow
8	"Die Überfahrt" (The voyage)	22 August 1972
Guest stars: Monica Peitsch, Inge Schmidt
9	"Ein klarer Fall" (An easy case)	12 September 1972
Guest stars: Hans-Werner Bussinger, Michael Gempart
10	"Katz und Maus" (Cat and mouse)	19 September 1972
Guest star: Robert Nägele
11	"Galgenfrist" (Last respite)	26 September 1972
Guest stars: Hans-Michael Rehberg, Heinz-Leo Fischer
12	"Madonnen lassen bitten" (Madonnas ask you in)	3 October 1972
Guest stars: Claus Eberth, Valentin Jäger
13	"Made in Italy"	10 October 1972
Guest stars: Karl Walter Diess, Ingrid Resch
14	"Der Doppelgänger" (The look-alike)	17 October 1972
Guest stars: Peter Fricke, Horst Naumann
15	"Treffpunkt Via Mala" (Meetining place Via Mala)	24 October 1972
Guest star: Rotraud Rieger
16	"Diamantenraub" (Diamonds are robbed)	31 October 1972
Guest stars: Gundy Grand, Kurt Klopsch
17	"Blondinen für Rio" (Blondes for Rio)	7 November 1972
Guest stars: Lia Pahl, Horst Sommer
18	"Achtung Kurve" (Beware of the bend)	14 November 1972
Guest stars: Horst-Werner Loos, Peter Herzog, Werner Zerlett
19	"Der Spezialist"	21 November 1972
Guest star: Alexander Allerson
20	"Das Partygirl"	28 November 1972
Guest star: Barbara Valentin
21	"Die Kidnapper"	5 December 1972
Guest stars: Otto Bolesch, Ulrike Blome
22	"Container gesucht" (Wanted: A container)	12 December 1972
Guest stars: Ilse Neubauer, Johannes Grossmann, Traugott Buhre
23	"Der Heckenschütze" (The sniper)	19 December 1972
Guest stars: Harry Kalenberg, Nora Minor, Michael Hinz
24	"Das Sanatorium" (The hospital)	2 January 1973
Guest stars: Margot Trooger, Harald Dietl
25	"Schottischer Whisky" (Scotch)	9 January 1973
Guest stars: Dieter Kirchlechner, Richard Bohne
26	"Die Hellseherin" (The clairvoyant)	16 January 1973
Guest star: Hilde Ziegler

== Home media ==
The television series was digitally remastered and released on DVD in 2010, and some of Butler Parker's adventures have been released as audiobooks.
