= Born to Kill (1967 film) =

1967 film by Antonio Mollica

- Directed by: Antonio Mollica
- Written by: Antonio Mollica
- Produced by: Antonio Mollica
- Starring: Gordon Mitchell; Femi Benussi
- Cinematography: Oberdan Troiani
- Edited by: Enzo Alabiso
- Music by: Felice Di Stefano
- Production company: I.M.E. International Movies Enterprises
- Distributed by: I.M.E. International Movies Enterprises
- Release date: June 15, 1967
- Running time: 88 minutes
- Country: Italy
- Language: Italian

Born to Kill (Italian: Nato per uccidere, also known as Django - nato per uccidere) is a 1967 Italian Spaghetti Western film written, directed and produced by Antonio Mollica, at his directorial debut. It stars Gordon Mitchell and Femi Benussi.

== Cast ==
- Gordon Mitchell as Rod Gordon
- Femi Benussi as Flory
- Aldo Berti as Dudgett
- Franco Gulà as John Storm
- Tom Felleghy as Tyson
- Alfredo Rizzo as Spieler
- Giovanna Lenzi as Rose
