= Ely Drago =

Italian film actress

Ely Drago was an Italian film actress.

She played Jocasta in Ercole al centro della terra (1961), directed by Mario Bava and starring Christopher Lee, Leonora Ruffo and Marisa Belli, and Gina in Sua Eccellenza si fermò a mangiare (1961), directed by Mario Mattòli.

== Filmography ==
- Le sedicenni (1965)
- Man from Canyon City (1965) as Rosario
- Hercules in the Haunted World (1961) as Giocasta
- Sua Eccellenza si fermò a mangiare (1961) as Gina
- Aventura en Capri (1959) as Una turista
