= Clint the Stranger =

1967 film

- Wild East DVD Cover
- Directed by: Alfonso Balcázar
- Written by: Alfonso Balcázar; José Antonio de la Loma; Helmut Harun
- Starring: George Martin
- Cinematography: Víctor Monreal
- Edited by: Otello Colangeli
- Music by: Nora Orlandi
- Release date: 1967
- Running time: 92 minutes
- Country: Italy
- Language: Italian

Clint the Stranger, also known as Clint the Nevada's Loner, Nevada Clint and Clint, the Lonely Nevadan (in original Italian, Clint il solitario), is a 1967 Italian Spaghetti Western starring George Martin. A sequel entitled The Return of Clint the Stranger would follow in 1972.

== Synopsis ==
Clint, a former gunslinger, meets his ex-wife Julie in town. She left him years ago because of his violent ways. To win back Julie's love and be a good father to his son, Clint gives up his gun. But when a brutal rancher and his men bring violence to the area, Clint breaks his promise and takes up arms to fight them alone.

== Cast ==
- George Martin as Clint Harrison
- Marianne Koch as Julie Harrison
- Gerhard Riedmann as Bill O'Brien
- Pinkas Braun as Don Shannon
- Xan das Bolas as Simpson
- Osvaldo Genazzani
- Beni Deus as McKInley
- Francisco José Huetos as Tom Harrison
- Remo De Angelis
- Fernando Sancho as Ross
- Renato Baldini as Contadino
- Walter Barnes as Walter Shannon
- Paolo Gozlino as Dave Shannon
- Luis Barboo
- Gustavo Re as Peabody

== Releases ==
Wild East released the film on a limited edition R0 NTSC DVD in a double feature with its sequel The Return of Clint the Stranger with the alternate title Clint the Nevada's Loner, present on the cover art. It is now out-of-print.
