= Dragon Rapide (film) =

1986 film by Jaime Camino

- Directed by: Jaime Camino
- Written by: Jaime Camino; Román Gubern
- Produced by: Jaime Camino
- Cinematography: Juan Amorós
- Edited by: Teresa Alcocer
- Music by: Xavier Montsalvatge
- Production companies: Rai - Radiotelevisione Italiana; Televisión Española; Tibidabo Films S.A.
- Release date: 10 July 1986
- Running time: 100 min

Dragon Rapide is a 1986 Spanish historical drama film directed, written and produced by Jaime Camino, and starring Juan Diego, Vicky Peña and Manuel de Blas. It is composed by Xavier Montsalvatge. It is about the Spanish Civil War.

== Cast ==
- Juan Diego as General Franco
- Manuel de Blas as General Mola
- Saturno Cerra as General Kindelan
- Eduardo MacGregor as General Fanjul
- Ramón Durán as General Cabanelles
- Carlos Lucena as General Batet
- Alberto Fernández de Rosa as General Orgaz
- Jorge Bosso as Coronel Solans
- Luis Lasala as General Romerales
- José María Escuer as Coronel Sáez de Buruaga
- Antonio Canal as Coronel de Estado Mayor
- Conrado San Martín as Coronel Monóculo
- Pedro Díez del Corral as Tte. Coronel Salgado Araujo
- Francisco Casares as Tte. Coronel Martínez Fuset
- Teófilo Calle as Tte. Coronel Galarza
- Damián Velasco as Tte. Coronel Yagüe
- Antonio Ross as Comandante García González
- Alfredo Enríquez as Capitán Villalobos
- Francisco Lahoz as Capitán Guardia Civil
- Arnau Vilardebó as Capitán Bando
- José Manuel Martín as Oficial ayudante del General Franco
- Mauro Rivera as Oficial ayudante del General Franco
- José Luis González as Oficial ayudante del General Franco
- Chema Adeva as Oficial ayudante del General Franco
- Floreal Fernández as Oficial ayudante del General Mola
- Miguel Malla as Asistente del General Franco
- Vicky Peña as Carmen Polo de Franco
- Yolanda as Carmencita Franco
- Santiago Ramos as Luis Bolín
- Margarita Lascoiti as Esposa de Luis Bolín
- Laura García Lorca as Patricia
- Miguel Molina as Paco
- Rafael Alonso as Redactor jefe
- Sergio Raúl as Periodista
- Amado Gómez as Periodista
- José Luis Pellicena as José Calvo Sotelo
- Ángela Rosal as Esposa Calvo Sotelo
- Remedios Boza as Criada Calvo Sotelo
- Jarque as Pau Casals
- Pedro del Río as Juan March
- José Pedro Carrión as Félix Maiz
- Michel Proudoot as Piloto Bebb
- David Hart as Hugh Pollard
- Roberto Quintana as Marqués del Mérito
- Julea Mewburn as Dorothy
- Christina Rosenvinge as Diana
- Peter Boulter as Olley
- José Luis Alonso as Pepe
- José María Labernié as Diplomático
- Hugo Blanco as Juan de La Cierva
- Mauro Muñiz as Cuenca
- Fernando Chinarro as Doctor Gabarda
- Miguel Palenzuela as Presidente Gobierno
- Carles Cases as Juan Ignacio Luca de Tena
- Bernardo de las Heras as Mago
- Juan Margallo as Marroquí
- Jesús Fernández as Falangista
- José Ruiz Lifante as Camarero
- José María Caffarel as Comisario Policía
- Georges Dal as Goicoechea
- Ian Gibson as Jugador de golf
- Isabel Betancor as Locutora de radio
- Charly Bravo
- Carlos Iglesias as Periodista
