= Lights and Shadows (1988 film) =

1988 film by Jaime Camino

- Luces y sombras
- Directed by: Jaime Camino
- Written by: Jaime Camino; José Sanchis Sinisterra
- Starring: José Luis Gómez; Jack Shepherd; Ángela Molina
- Cinematography: Josep M. Civit
- Music by: Xavier Montsalvatge
- Release date: 1988
- Language: Spanish

Lights and Shadows (Catalan: Llums i ombres, Spanish: Luces y sombras) is a 1988 Catalan Spanish fantasy film written and directed by the Barcelonan director, Jaime Camino.

The film was entered into the main competition at the 45th edition of the Venice Film Festival. For her performance, Ángela Molina was nominated for best actress at the 3rd Goya Awards.

== Cast ==
- José Luis Gómez as Diego de Velazquez
- Jack Shepherd as Teo
- Ángela Molina as Charo
- Fermi Reixach as King Felipe IV
- Martí Galindo
- Víctor Rubio
- María Mercader
