= Reborn (1981 film) =

1981 film

- Directed by: Bigas Luna
- Screenplay by: Bigas Luna; Robert Dunn
- Starring: Dennis Hopper; Michael Moriarty; Antonella Murgia; Francisco Rabal
- Cinematography: Juan Ruiz Anchía
- Edited by: Anastasi Rinos
- Music by: Scott Harper
- Release date: 1981

Reborn (Spanish: Renacer) is a 1981 Spanish thriller film co-written and directed by Bigas Luna.

The first English-language production of Luna, it was shot between Houston, Galveston, Los Angeles and Barcelona. It premiered out of competition at the 38th edition of the Venice Film Festival.

== Plot ==
When a woman starts bleeding from Christ's crucifixion wounds, her boyfriend must shield her from a manipulative evangelist.

== Cast ==
- Dennis Hopper as Rev. Tom Hartley
- Michael Moriarty as Mark
- Antonella Murgia as Maria
- Francisco Rabal as Giacomo
- Kit Massengill as Reed
- Charles Bacarisse as Charles
- Fernando Rubio as Maria's Father
- Robert Dunn as Shilo
- Leslie Cox as Secretary
- Xabier Elorriaga as Announcer
