= Le sedicenni =

- Directed by: Luigi Petrini
- Written by: Franco Castellano; Giuseppe Moccia
- Music by: Bruno Canfora
- Release date: 1965
- Country: Italy
- Language: Italian

16 Year Olds or Le sedicenni is a 1965 Italian film directed by Luigi Petrini.

== Cast ==
- Laura Antonelli
- Franca Badeschi
- Lilly Bistrattin
- Anna Maria Checchi
- Dino
- Carlo Giuffrè
- Rosalba Grottesi
- Lorenza Guerrieri
- Alberto Mandolesi
- Marina Marfoglia
- Bice Valori
- Ely Drago
