= Sabine Bethmann =

German actress (1929–2021)

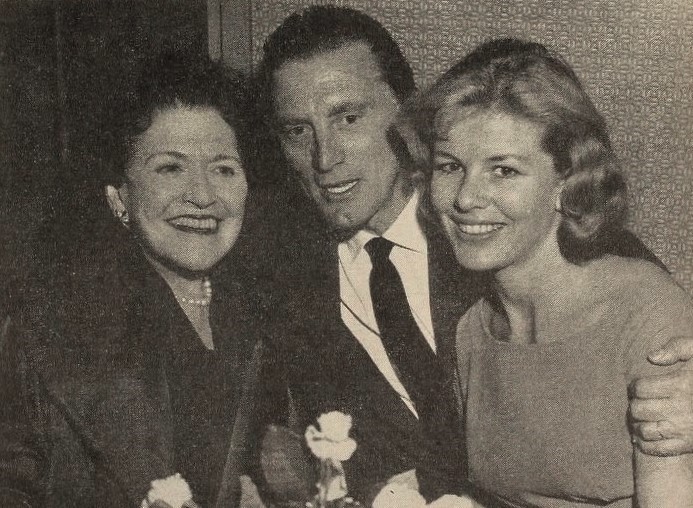
- Bethmann (right) with Louella Parsons and Kirk Douglas in 1959
- Born: 25 October 1929; Tilsit, East Prussia, Germany
- Died: 8 November 2021 (aged 92); Berlin, Germany
- Occupation: Actress
- Years active: 1956–1990

Sabine Bethmann (25 October 1929 – 8 November 2021) was a German film and television actress.

== Biography ==
Bethmann was born in Tilsit, East Prussia on 25 October 1929. She first appeared in the 1956 movie Waldwinter and became popular by her Fritz Lang movies like The Tiger of Eschnapur and The Indian Tomb. Bethmann abandoned her career in 1968 and appeared only in a few TV productions afterwards.

She was originally cast for the role of Varinia in Spartacus but only lasted two days. During that time, Anthony Mann resigned as director after a falling-out with Kirk Douglas and was succeeded by Stanley Kubrick who demanded a more experienced actress for the role. Bethmann was replaced by Jean Simmons.

Bethmann died on 8 November 2021, at the age of 92.

== Filmography ==
- 1956: Waldwinter
- 1956: Das Donkosakenlied
- 1956: My Aunt, Your Aunt
- 1957: Das große Heimweh / Heimweh – dort, wo die Blumen blüh'n
- 1957: Haie und kleine Fische
- 1958: The Csardas King
- 1958: Vergiß mein nicht / Ohne Dich kann ich nicht leben
- 1959: The Tiger of Eschnapur
- 1959: The Indian Tomb
- 1959: Heimat – Deine Lieder
- 1959: Morgen wirst du um mich weinen
- 1960: Juanito
- 1962: Doctor Sibelius
- 1962: Alarm für Dora X (TV)
- 1962: Trompeten der Liebe / Der Pastor mit der Jazztrompete
- 1963: Is Geraldine an Angel?
- 1963: Scotland Yard Hunts Dr. Mabuse
- 1964: Schwarzer Peter (TV)
- 1965: Intercontinental-Express (TV)
- 1965: Jean (TV)
- 1965: Girls Behind Bars
- 1965: Oklahoma John
- 1966: Cliff Dexter (TV)
- 1966: The Doctor Speaks Out
- 1968: Erotik auf der Schulbank
- 1968: Die Lümmel von der ersten Bank – Zum Teufel mit der Penne
- 1968: Kiedy miłość była zbrodnią
- 1970: Gentlemen in White Vests
- 1979: The Old Fox: Teufelsbrut (TV)
- 1990: Kaffeklatsch (short)
