= Cabezas cortadas =

1970 film directed by Glauber Rocha

- Directed by: Glauber Rocha
- Written by: Glauber Rocha
- Produced by: Jose Antonio Perez Giner; Modesto Perez Redondo
- Starring: Pierre Clémenti; Francisco Rabal
- Cinematography: Jaime Deu Casas
- Edited by: Eduardo Escorel
- Production companies: Mapa Filmes; Filmscontacto
- Distributed by: Embrafilme; Hispamex
- Release dates: October 16, 1970 (Spain); June 11, 1979
- Running time: 94 minutes
- Countries: Spain; Brazil
- Language: Spanish

Cabezas cortadas (English: Severed Heads, sometimes translated as Cutting Heads; Portuguese: Cabeças Cortadas), is a 1970 Spanish-Brazilian film directed by Glauber Rocha.

== Cast ==
- Pierre Clémenti
- Francisco Rabal
- Rosa Maria Penna
- Luis Ciges
- Emma Cohen
- Marta May
- Telesforo Sanchez
- Victor Israel
