= Fuera de la ley (1964 film) =

1964 film

Billy the Kid
- Spanish: Fuera de la ley
- Directed by: León Klimovsky
- Screenplay by: Ángel del Castillo; S.G. Monner; Bob Sirens
- Story by: Ángel del Castillo; S.G. Monner; Bob Sirens
- Starring: George Martin; Jack Taylor; Juny Brunell
- Cinematography: Manuel Hernández Sanjuán
- Edited by: Antonio Gimeno
- Music by: Daniel J. White
- Production company: Carthago Coop. Cinematográfica
- Distributed by: D.C. Films
- Release date: 9 July 1964
- Running time: 91 min
- Country: Spain

Billy the Kid (Spanish: Fuera de la ley) is a 1964 Spanish Western film directed by León Klimovsky, written by Ángel del Castillo, S.G. Monner, and Bob Sirens and starring George Martin, Jack Taylor, Luis Induni, and Aldo Sambrell.

== Cast ==
- George Martin as Billy Carter
- Jack Taylor as Black Jack
- Juny Brunel
- Tomás Blanco
- Luis Induni as Pryce
- Esther Grant
- Al Sambrell as Sheriff
- Alberto Dalbés
- Tota Alba
- Simón Arriaga
- José Canalejas
- Margot Cottens
- Claudio Denis
- Gaspar 'Indio' González
- José Luis Zalde
- Henri Macedo
- Enrique Núñez
- Lorenzo Robledo
