= Patricia Loran =

Actress

- Born: 1946 (age 79–80); Granada, Spain
- Occupation: Actress
- Years active: 1965–1974 (film)

Patricia Loran (born 1946) is a retired Spanish film actress.

== Selected filmography ==
- Seven Pistols for a Gringo (1966)
- Love in Flight (1967)
- Seven Murders for Scotland Yard (1971)
- The Crimes of Petiot (1973)

== Bibliography ==
- Thomas Weisser. Spaghetti Westerns: the Good, the Bad and the Violent. McFarland, 2005.
