= Sua Eccellenza si fermò a mangiare =

1961 film

- Film poster
- Directed by: Mario Mattoli
- Written by: Roberto Gianviti; Vittorio Metz
- Produced by: Isidoro Broggi; Renato Libassi
- Starring: Ugo Tognazzi, Totò, Raimondo Vianello
- Cinematography: Alvaro Mancori
- Edited by: Gisa Radicchi Levi
- Music by: Gianni Ferrio
- Release date: 1961
- Running time: 101 minutes
- Country: Italy
- Language: Italian

Sua Eccellenza si fermò a mangiare is a 1961 Italian comedy film directed by Mario Mattoli and starring Ugo Tognazzi.

== Plot ==
In Rome, during the early 30s, a con artist played by Totò impersonates dr. Biagio Tanzarella, Benito Mussolini's personal physician in order to blackmail Ernesto, an unfaithful husband.

Ernesto's wife, Silvia, is very beautiful and charming but he resents her aloofness and has a tryst with an older woman, Lauretta, whom he perceives as more easygoing and desirable.

Silvia's mother, Countess Bernabei, invites "Dr. Tanzarella" to her country estate where a Minister of State is to be her guest to inaugurate a monument to a minor local celebrity, she hopes, through her good offices with both the Minister and the Doctor, to further Ernesto's career, perhaps securing a government post for him.

The false "doctor" at first tries to decline the invitation but, upon hearing that during the banquet offered to the Minister the Bernabei family will use a set of solid-gold tableware chiseled by world-famous Renaissance sculptor and jeweler Benvenuto Cellini, he accepts and brings Lauretta with him pretending her to be his wife; he does so to keep Ernesto from revealing his true identity. Lauretta, to whom Ernesto told to be married with a much older and ugly woman, seethes with rage seeing that his wife is actually younger and prettier than her.

During their stay at the country villa errors and misunderstandings abound with a richness of comedic situations stemming from the intricate web of lies tying the various characters together and from Dr. Tanzarella's relentless efforts to steal the golden tablewares; later the Minister is revealed to have tried, years before, to seduce Lauretta in a train carriage only to suffer an embarrassing sexual defaillance.

In the end the false doctor manages to get away with the loot, in plain sight of the guests with the aid of a fake phone call from The Duce himself, Ernesto and Silvia are reconciled and the flame of their marital affection rekindled once and for all, the Minister elevates Ernesto to a high government post and manages to make up for his failed love performance with Lauretta.

== Cast ==
- Totò as Dr. Biagio Tanzarella
- Ugo Tognazzi as Ernesto
- Virna Lisi as Silvia
- Lauretta Masiero as Lauretta
- Lia Zoppelli as Countess Bernabei
- Raimondo Vianello as Minister
- Francesco Mulé as Inspector
- Vittorio Congia as Secretary of the Minister
- Pietro De Vico as Waiter
- Mario Siletti as Count Tommaso Bernabei
- Nando Bruno as Innkeeper
- Anna Campori as Innkeeper's wife
- Ignazio Leone as Gennarino
- Ely Drago as Gina
