= The Crimes of Petiot =

- Directed by: José Luis Madrid
- Written by: José Luis Madrid; Paul Naschy
- Produced by: José Luis Madrid
- Starring: Paul Naschy; Patricia Loran; Fernando Marín
- Cinematography: Félix Mirón
- Edited by: Luis Álvarez
- Music by: Ángel Arteaga
- Production company: Cinefilms
- Distributed by: DICINSA
- Release date: 9 July 1973
- Running time: 85 minutes
- Country: Spain
- Language: Spanish

The Crimes of Petiot (Spanish:Los crímenes de Petiot) is a 1973 Spanish giallo film directed by José Luis Madrid and starring Paul Naschy, Patricia Loran and Fernando Marín.

== Cast ==
- Paul Naschy as Boris Villowa / Padre de Marcel
- Patricia Loran as Vera
- Fernando Marín as Heinrich Weiss
- Anastasio Campoy as Comisario Wilhelm Rotwang
- Lucía Prado as Madeleine
- Ramón Lillo as Konrad Freund
- Vicente Haro as Inspector Muller
- María Pinar
- Hugo Astar
- Enrique San Francisco as Policía
- Monika Rey
- Maite Crespo
- Víctor Iregua
- Jesús Nieto as Marcel 9 Años

== Bibliography ==
- Steven Jay Schneider. Fear Without Frontiers: Horror Cinema Across the Globe. FAB, 2003.
