= Paton Price =

- Born: May 2, 1916; Evant, Texas, U.S.
- Died: April 26, 1982 (aged 65); Los Angeles, California, U.S.
- Education: Texas Tech University
- Occupations: Director, actor, acting coach
- Years active: 1936–1964
- Spouse: Tilly
- Children: Dean Price

Paton Price (May 2, 1916 – April 26, 1982) was an American actor, director, and acting coach. After moving from his native Texas to New York City and performing on Broadway starting in the 1930s, he became an acting coach. First associated with the American Academy of Dramatic Arts, he would work with Warner Bros. and Columbia Pictures, and would help to develop the careers of actors such as Kirk Douglas, Colleen Dewhurst, Jean Seberg, and Dick Clark, among others.

== Biography ==
Price was born in Evant, Texas on May 2, 1916. He graduated from Texas Tech University with a degree in English and would move to New York City to attend the American Academy of Dramatic Arts and participate in Broadway productions. This included productions such as Crime and Punishment with Sir John Gielgud.

By the 1940s, he would go on to teach at the Academy, teaching notable actors and actresses such as Douglas, Dewhurst, Jason Robards, and Don Murray, among others. He also directed theater productions in Ohio during this time. During this time, he also collaborated with Frank Lloyd Wright and Eugene Masselink in attempting to build a new theater in Hartford, Connecticut. Called the New Theater after Wright's previous plans to build a theater of the same name in Woodstock, New York, the plan was abandoned due to local opposition, but the two remained on good terms.

Price would later move to Hollywood in the 1950s and teach various actors and actresses including Seberg, Clark, Kent McCord, Victoria Shaw, the Smothers Brothers, and Glenn Corbett. He would also go on to direct episodes of various television shows in the 1960s, such as 77 Sunset Strip, Maverick, The Smothers Brothers Comedy Hour, and The Partridge Family.

Politically active and a devout pacifist, Price spent four years at Lewisburg Penitentiary Center due to his refusal to serve in the United States Armed Forces during World War II as a conscientious objector. His pacifism, along with his regard of acting as a mode of professing one's beliefs, deeply influenced his then-student Dean Reed.

Price would retire from teaching professionally in 1964 and retire to his ranch in Paso Robles, California. He died on April 26, 1982, at Cedars-Sinai Medical Center in Los Angeles. At the time of his death, he was survived by his wife Tilly and a son. He was buried at Forest Lawn Hollywood Hills.
