= Gustavo Re =

- Born: 7 April 1908; Milan
- Died: 5 June 1979 (aged 71); Barcelona
- Occupations: Television presenter and actor

Gustavo Re (7 April 1908 – 5 June 1979) was a Spanish television presenter and actor.

== Biography ==
On 10 October 1961 it was aired on TVE Amigos del martes, hosted by Artur Kaps, Franz Johan and Gustavo Re. They found a theater company named «Los vieneses», which was also collaborated by Herta Frankel, and Nati Mistral in Germany.

He appeared in Historias de la radio (1955), directed by José Luis Sáenz de Heredia and starring Francisco Rabal, Margarita Andrey, Tony Leblanc, José Luis Ozores and José Isbert; Totò d'Arabia (1964), directed by José Antonio de la Loma and starring Totò and Nieves Navarro; La diligencia de los condenados (1970), directed by Ignacio F. Iquino and starring Erika Blanc and Bruno Corazzari; and Un verano para matar (1972), directed by Antonio Isasi-Isasmendi and starring Karl Malden, Olivia Hussey and Christopher Mitchum.

He was honoured along Pepe da Rosa, Franz Johann, Andrés Pajares, Cassen, Fernando Esteso, Kiko, Tip y Coll, Lina Morgan, Zori and Santosin in the television special Humor en blanco y negro, aired in Cómo nos reímos in La 2.

== Selected filmography ==
- 39 cartas de amor (1955) as Barón
- Truhanes de honor (1955) as Lodiwick
- Facultad de letras (1952)
- La llamada de África (1952) as Antonio
- Hermano menor (1953)
- Intriga en el escenario (1953) as Óscar
- Todo es posible en Granada (1954) as Quincallero
- High Fashion (1954) as Mr. Byars
- Tres eran tres (1955) (segment "Una de pandereta")
- Historias de la radio (1955) as Esquimal
- Confidential Report (1955) as Italian police in Naples port (uncredited)
- Tangier Assignment (1955) as Schuman / Abdul
- Mañana cuando amanezca (1955) as Otro guardián
- Congreso en Sevilla (1955) as Director de Radio AGA
- Un día perdido (1955) as Portero
- El difunto es un vivo (1956) as Luquitas
- Hospital de urgencia (1956) as Enfermo fumando en la cama
- Quiéreme con música (1957) as Jose Luis
- Los ángeles del volante (1957) as Sustituto del Manazas
- El bandido generoso (1957)
- Pasaje a Venezuela (1957) as Comerciante de pescado
- Familia provisional (1958)
- Cita imposible (1958) as Giovanni Esposito / Maximo Rebinsky de Walewska
- Action Stations (1959) (uncredited)
- The Colossus of Rhodes (1961) as Mercante (uncredited)
- Juventud a la intemperie (1961) as Camarero (uncredited)
- No dispares contra mí (1961) as Juan
- Los atracadores (1962) as Cómplice del mago que acosa a Isabel
- El último verano (1962) as Pescador (uncredited)
- Vamos a contar mentiras (1961) as Médico
- ¿Dónde pongo este muerto? (1962) as Cartier
- Los castigadores (1962) as Mario
- Las travesuras de Morucha (1962)
- El grano de mostaza (1962) as Mr. Quino
- La bella Lola (1962) as Comisario
- La gran coartada (1963) as Director
- The Adventures of Scaramouche (1963)
- Trampa mortal (1963) as Gustavo
- José María (1963) as Coronel
- A tiro limpio (1964) as Señor del Garaje
- Piso de soltero (1964) as Don Gustavo
- Un rincón para querernos (1964) as Claudio
- La muerte llama otra vez (1964)
- Toto de Arabia (1965) as Sir Turner
- That Man in Istanbul (1965) as Brain
- La chica del autostop (1965) as Conductor estafado
- Sunscorched (1965) as Dueño del bar
- Mi canción es para ti (1965) (uncredited)
- Día de fiesta (1966, TV Series)
- 4 Dollars of Revenge (1966)
- Dollar of Fire (1966) as Postmaster Gennor
- Ruthless Colt of the Gringo (1966) as Juez Wilker
- 07 con el 2 delante (Agente: Jaime Bonet) (1966) as Mr. Murray
- Seven Pistols for a Gringo (1966) as Nat
- Clint the Stranger (1967) as Peabody (uncredited)
- The Viscount (1967) (uncredited)
- Die Slowly, You'll Enjoy It More (1967) as Morgan
- La tía de Carlos en mini-falda (1967) as Don Servando
- Sartana Does Not Forgive (1968) as the Undertaker
- They Came to Rob Las Vegas (1968) as Salvatore
- The Day the Hot Line Got Hot (1968) as Police Chief
- Marquis de Sade's Justine (1969) as Desroches
- The Castle of Fu Manchu (1969) as Professor Heracles (uncredited)
- Chico, chica, ¡boom! (1969) as Maitre
- Turistas y bribones (1969) as Mr. Rosenberg
- El abogado, el alcalde y el notario (1969) as Doctor
- El Puro se sienta, espera y dispara (1969) as Fernando
- El señorito y las seductoras (1969) as Médico
- La banda de los tres crisantemos (1970) as Doctor (uncredited)
- Versatile Lovers (1970) as Gustav (uncredited)
- Twenty Paces to Death (1970) as Eugene
- Stagecoach of the Condemned (1970) as John McCandy
- Percy Stuart (1970, TV Series) as Waldmüller
- Blackie the Pirate (1971) as Noble
- Dig Your Grave Friend... Sabata's Coming (1971) as George McGowan
- Rain for a Dusty Summer (1971) as Prison Official (uncredited)
- La liga no es cosa de hombres (1972) as Don Ramón
- Summertime Killer (1972) as Guido
- God in Heaven... Arizona on Earth (1972) as Dentist
- They Believed He Was No Saint (1972) as Padre Javier
- Robinson and His Tempestuous Slaves (1972) as Lascius
- Fabulous Trinity (1972) as Sr. Wells
- A Noose Is Waiting for You Trinity (1972) as Blinky - bartender
- Horror Story (1972) as Barón Von Kraus
- La venganza del Doctor Mabuse (1972) as Malou
- The Hunted (1972) as Night man
- Fat Brothers of Trinity (1973) as Carrigan
- Las juergas de 'El Señorito' (1973) as Don Antonio
- La corrupción de Chris Miller (1973) as Shopkeeper
- The Lonely Woman (1973) as Old homosexual
- La ley del karate en el Oeste (1973) as Johnson
- Aborto criminal (1973) as Ramón, padre de Ana
- Emma, puertas oscuras (1974) as John
- Cuando los niños vienen de Marsella (1974) as Agente inmobiliario
- El último proceso en París (1974) as Presidente
- El pez de los ojos de oro (1974) as Miguel Toledo
- The Passenger (1974) (uncredited)
- Préstamela esta noche (1978) as Pianista (final film role)
