= Three are Three =

- Directed by: Eduardo García Maroto
- Written by: Ángel Falquina; Jaime García-Herranz; Eduardo García Maroto; Antonio de Lara
- Cinematography: Heinrich Gärtner; Carlos Pahissa
- Edited by: Bienvenida Sanz
- Music by: Augusto Algueró; Daniel Montorio
- Production company: Cooperativa del Cinema de Madrid
- Distributed by: C.E.A. Distribución
- Release date: 10 January 1955
- Running time: 81 minutes
- Country: Spain
- Language: Spanish

Three are Three (Spanish: Tres eran tres) is a 1955 Spanish comedy film directed by Eduardo García Maroto, written by himself, Jaime García-Herranz and Antonio de Lara. In three separate segments it parodies different film genres.

Awarded in 1954 the Golden Medal of the Cinema Writers Circle to the best screenplay .

== Cast ==
- Manuel Alba (segment "Una de pandereta")
- José Alburquerque (segment "Una de indios")
- Mariano Alcón (segment "Una de indios")
- Antonio Almorós (segment "Una de pandereta")
- Manuel Arbó González, el monstruo (segment "Una de monstruos")
- Francisco Bernal (segment "Una de indios")
- Xan das Bolas (segment "Una de indios")
- Félix Briones hijo (segment "Una de indios")
- Félix Briones (segment "Una de indios")
- José Bódalo (segment "Introducción: Tribunal")
- Rafael Calvo Revilla (segment "Una de pandereta")
- Antonio Casas (segment "Una de indios")
- José Castells (segment "Una de pandereta")
- Irene D'Astrea (segment "Introducción: Tribunal")
- Antonio Díaz del Castillo (segment "Una de pandereta")
- María Luisa Díaz Pavón (segment "Una de indios")
- Ángel Etura (segment "Una de pandereta")
- Maite Guerri (segment "Una de pandereta")
- Manuel Guitián (segment "Una de indios")
- Guillermo Hidalgo (segment "Una de indios")
- Arturo Marín (segment "Una de pandereta")
- José Meana (segment "Una de pandereta")
- Fernando Merino (segment "Una de pandereta")
- Manolo Morán as Announcer (segments "Una de monstruos" and "Una de pandereta")
- Carlos Muñiz (segment "Introducción: Tribunal")
- Matilde Mújica (segment "Una de pandereta")
- Rosa Palomar
- Teófilo Palou (segment "Una de pandereta")
- Nicolás D. Perchicot (segment "Introducción: Tribunal")
- Joaquín Portillo 'Top' (segment "Una de monstruos")
- Gustavo Re (segment "Una de pandereta")
- Manuel Requena (segment "Una de monstruos")
- Antonio Riquelme Announcer (segment "Una de indios")
- Jacinto San Emeterio (segment "Una de monstruos")
- Emilio Santiago (segment "Una de pandereta")
- Pilar Sirvent (segment "Una de indios")
- Luis Sánchez Polack (segment "Una de monstruos")
- Aníbal Vela (segment "Una de pandereta")
- Laura Vázquez Díaz (segment "Una de monstruos")
- Pablo Álvarez Rubio (segment "Una de pandereta")
- Ángel Álvarez (segment "Introducción: Tribunal")

== Bibliography ==
- Bentley, Bernard. A Companion to Spanish Cinema. Boydell & Brewer 2008.
