= Marta May =

Spanish actress (born 1939)

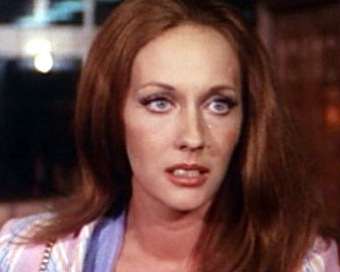
- Marta May in Eyeball (1975)
- Born: María Jesús Mayor Ávila; 14 June 1939 (age 87); Santander, Cantabria
- Occupation: Actress

Marta May, (born María Jesús Mayor Ávila, 14 June 1939) is a Spanish actress.

In 1968, she was awarded by the Círculo de Escritores Cinematográficos for best actress in La piel quemada.

In 1975, Esteban Durán directed Algo de ti en el arcoiris at the Teatro Don Juan in Barcelona, and it starred Alejandro Ulloa, Marta May, and Eduardo Criado.

In 2010s, she made paintings about great women in the 20th century and jazz artists.

== Filmography ==
=== Film ===
- Twins from Texas (1964) as Betty
- Doomed Fort (1964) as Mary
- The Texican (1966) as Elena
- Seven Pistols for a Gringo (1966) as Lily
- La mujer del desierto (1966)
- El primer cuartel (1967) as Asunción
- La piel quemada (1967) as Juana
- La respuesta (1969) as Renata
- Twenty Paces to Death (1970)
- Cabezas cortadas (1970) as Soledad
- Metamorfosis (1970)
- La mujer celosa (1970) as Sofía Durán
- Presagio (1970) as Carla
- Pulsus (1970, Short)
- Pastel de sangre (1971) as Vampira (segment "Terror entre cristianos")
- Las piernas de la serpiente (1972) as Blanca
- Horror Story (1972) as Katia
- Eyeball (1975) as Alma Burton
- Metralleta 'Stein' (1975) as Margarita
- La ciutat cremada (1976) as Desarrapada
- El avispero (1976)
- La ràbia (1978) as Professora de ciències
- Companys, procés a Catalunya (1979) as Carme Ballester
- Cara quemada (1980)
- El vicari d'Olot (1981) as Senyora Maria
- Putapela (1991)
- Puny clos (1982, Short)
- Pa d'àngel (1984)
- Un, dos, tres... ensaïmades i res més (1985) as Vídua Leclero
- Phoenix the Warrior (1988) as Prostitute
- The Ages of Lulu (1990) as Madre de Lulú
- La cruz de Iberia (1990) as Condesa

=== TV Series ===
- Un encargo original (1983, Episode: "El arte de mirar")
- La comedia (1983, Episode: "Sólo para hombres") as Valentina
