= Lorenza Guerrieri =

Italian actress

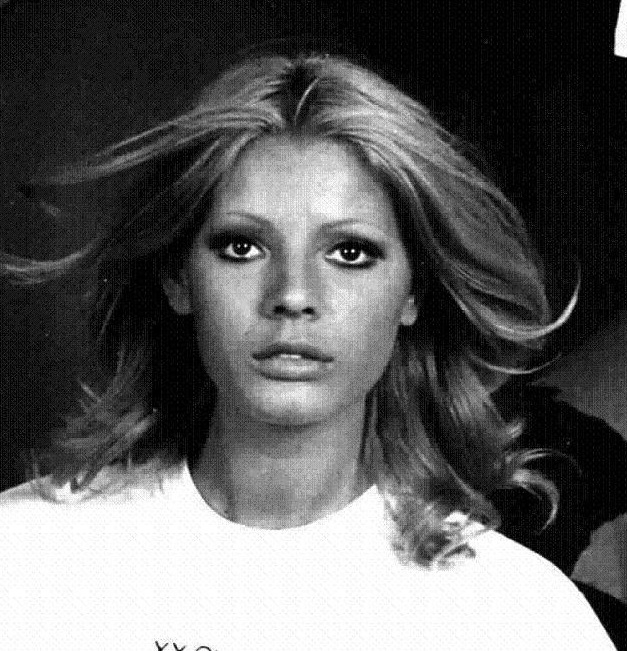
- Guerrieri in 1972
- Born: April 18, 1944 (age 81); Rome, Kingdom of Italy
- Occupation: Actress

Lorenza Guerrieri (born 18 April 1944) is an Italian actress.

Born in Rome, Lorenza Guerrieri made her film debut in the mid-1960s in Le sedicenni, and later appeared in films of any genre, mainly in secondary roles. She became popular with the TV-series Michel Strogoff (1975), in which she played the role of Nadia Fedor; since then she focused her career in television. Less prolific is her stage career, that however includes works with Garinei & Giovannini, Alberto Lionello and Maurizio Scaparro.
