= Dean Reed =

American actor and singer (1938–1986)

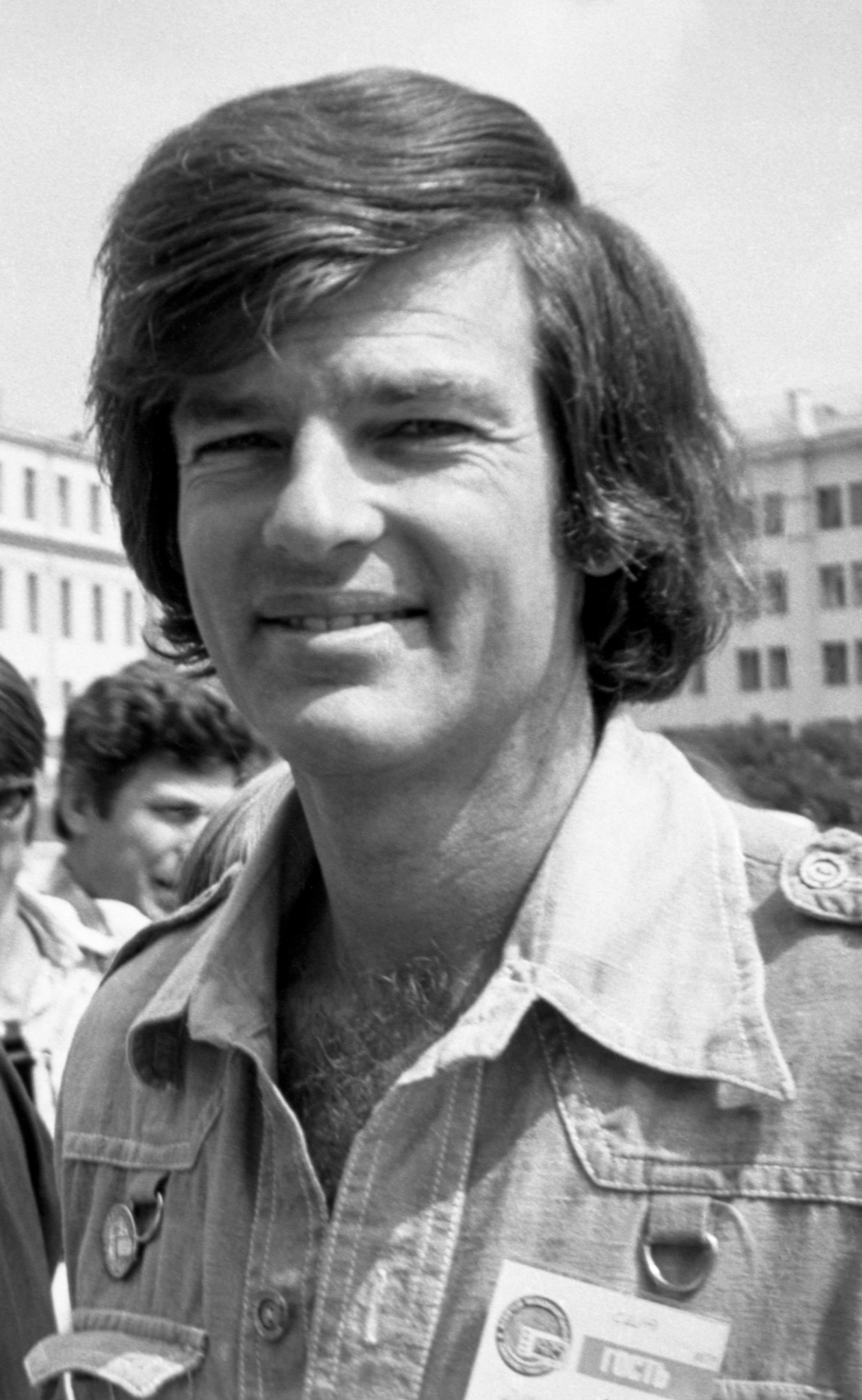
- Reed in 1975

Background information
- Also known as: Mr. Simpatia, Red Elvis
- Born: Dean Cyril Reed; September 22, 1938; Denver, Colorado, U.S.
- Died: June 13, 1986 (aged 47) Zeuthen, East Germany
- Genres: Pop, country, rock and roll
- Occupations: Singer, musician, actor, writer, director
- Instruments: Vocals, guitar
- Years active: 1958–1986
- Labels: Capitol Records, Melodiya, Amiga, Supraphon

Dean Cyril Reed (September 22, 1938 – June 13, 1986) was an American actor, singer-songwriter, director, and social activist who lived a great part of his adult life in South America and then in East Germany.

Nicknamed the Red Elvis, Reed was the best-selling Western performer in communist countries, with his songs often topping the local charts, and millions of his records were sold in the Eastern Bloc and elsewhere mostly under the Soviet Melodiya label. He never renounced his U.S. citizenship, despite often denouncing the policy of the U.S. government, and was seen by the Western media as a threat and as a revolutionary artist.

== Early life and education ==
Dean Reed was born in Denver, Colorado, on September 22, 1938. His father was a high school math and history teacher, described as a staunch anticommunist and supporter of Barry Goldwater, while his mother was a homemaker. He had two elder brothers, Dale and Vernon. Reed's family moved many times during the 1940s, living in various cities in California and Utah, before returning to Colorado.

He graduated from Wheat Ridge High School in 1956, where he was a star athlete on the track team. Despite his father's desire for Reed to enroll in a military academy, Reed studied meteorology for a couple of years at the University of Colorado Boulder and earned money in bars singing rock and roll and country music.

== Career ==
Reed moved to Hollywood, Los Angeles, California, at the age of 19 and with his good looks won roles in TV. He took acting classes with Warner Bros under Paton Price amongst others. Price was a pacifist and taught him that art should be a mode of promoting one's beliefs.

After realizing he had some talent as a musician, he recorded "Once Again" for Imperial Records as a one-off single to see if reaction to it would justify a full contract. Imperial did not offer a contract, but in 1958 Reed signed a long-term recording contract with Capitol Records. Capitol groomed him to be a teen idol and he produced some modestly popular singles, including "Annabelle", "The Search", "No Wonder", "A Pair of Scissors", "I Kissed a Queen", and "Our Summer Romance". He also made guest appearances on family television programs such as Bachelor Father. In 1985 he said, "When I was in Hollywood it was a place of fear and exploitation, a prostitution camp, where very few people could keep their integrity. I'm not ready to come back and do Coca-Cola ads to make a living."

=== International fame ===
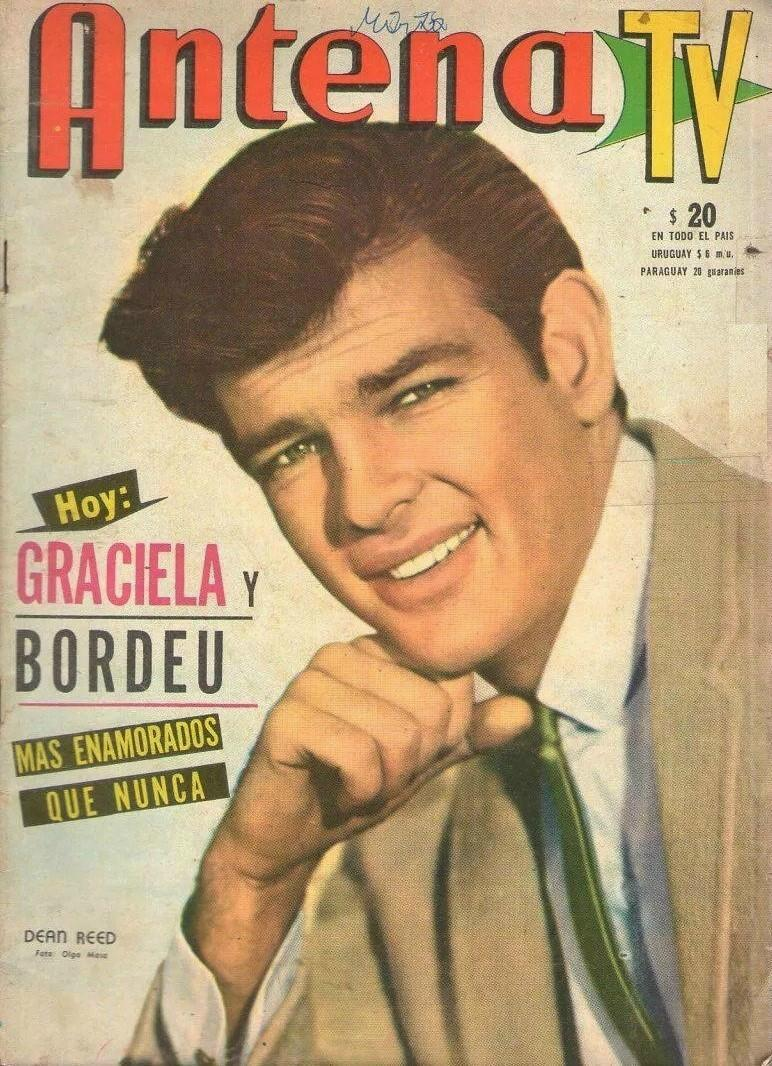
Dean Reed in Argentina (1965)

Reed never achieved musical success in the U.S., where "The Search" became his only Billboard entry at No. 96. However, "Our Summer Romance" proved to be very popular in South America. In March 1962, Capitol sent him on a forty-day tour of Brazil, Chile, and Peru. While in Chile, he developed a left-wing political philosophy, and began to speak out against oppression and poverty. He protested against nuclear weapons and US foreign policy, and performed shows free in poor neighborhoods and in prisons. After learning Spanish, he stayed on in Argentina for approximately four years.

During his live concert performances, he was accompanied by the group Los Dominantes, a rock-band from Lanus, formed by Juan Luis Bhe 'Ricky' (keyboard), Carlos Reale 'Charly' (bass), Dardo Rivero (first guitar), Juan Chiarello (second guitar), and Jacinto Atencio (drums). Reed made numerous albums and movies, toured extensively, and even appeared on his own television programs in Buenos Aires, such as Sabados Continuados, with the appearance of Antonio Carrizo.

In July 1965, he went to Europe for the first time, performing before the World Peace Council. He traveled frequently to Spain and Italy, and in 1966 he went on a singing tour through the Soviet Union.

Back in Buenos Aires, his politics eventually ran afoul of Argentine government policies after the 1966 military coup and he was deported. From 1967 to 1969 Reed lived in Rome, acting in television commercials and Spaghetti Western movies such as Adiós, Sabata (1970).

He toured Central and Eastern Europe, including the Soviet Union, where he was immensely popular.

In 1970, a week prior to the election of Chilean president Salvador Allende, he was arrested for washing a U.S. flag in front of Santiago's U.S. consulate. Pablo Neruda helped him to get out of jail. In 1971, he re-entered Chile only to be arrested again for 21 days. His wife filed for divorce at that point.

Also in 1971, Reed wrote an "open letter" to Alexander Solzhenitsyn, accusing him of having slandered the USSR.

=== Life in the Soviet bloc ===
In 1973, Reed chose to settle permanently in East Germany, where he continued to write, direct, and perform in films. Over the years he played in 20 films, produced 13 records, and gave concerts in 32 countries. The majority of his songs during this period were uncertified covers of successful hits of Chuck Berry, Elvis Presley, The Beatles and others. In 1978 he directed and starred in El Cantor (The Singer), a biopic about his friend Víctor Jara, the popular Chilean singer-songwriter murdered by the military after the 1973 coup d'état against President Salvador Allende.

While committed to the politics of his adopted communist home, he did not join the ruling Socialist Unity Party (SED). Despite his opposition to many US government and economic policies, he professed his love of America until the end of his life, and his songs often reflected his fondness for his homeland. He never renounced his US citizenship and continued to file tax returns with the Internal Revenue Service.

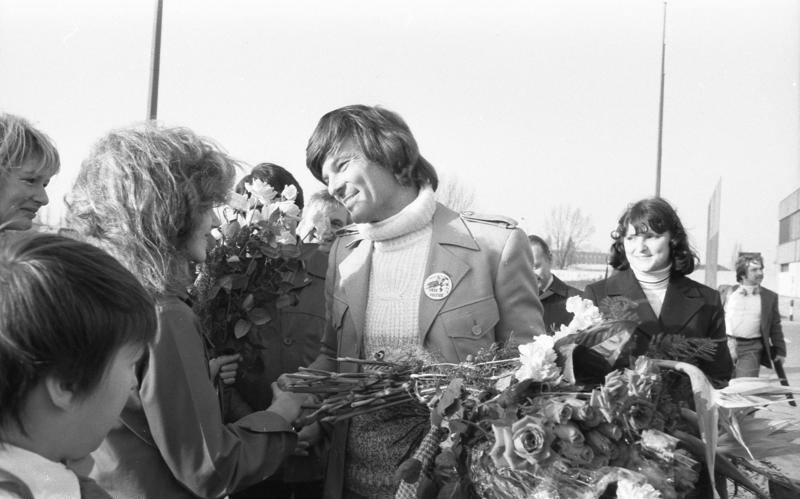
Reed in East Berlin, 1978.

In a 1986 television interview on CBS's 60 Minutes, he defended the Soviet intervention in Afghanistan and the building of the Berlin Wall, and compared Ronald Reagan negatively to Joseph Stalin, which angered many in the U.S., including Reed's family and friends. Following the interview, Reed received hate mail from the U.S. accusing him of being a traitor.

== Personal life ==
Reed married three times. His first marriage was circa 1964 to an American woman, Patricia Hobbs, with whom he had a daughter, Ramona, born 1968. Patricia left him in 1971, returned to the United States with their daughter, and divorced him.

Reed married an East German woman, Wiebke Dorndeck (née Schmidt), in 1973, with whom he had a second daughter, Natascha, born 1975. The couple divorced in 1978.

In 1981, he married his third wife, East German actress Renate Blume, with whom he stayed until his death despite tensions and allegations that she was informing on him to the Stasi.

Reed also had on and off affair for seven years with Estonian actress Eve Kivi.

== Death ==
Six weeks after his appearance on 60 Minutes, Reed was found dead in Zeuthener Lake near his home in East Berlin. Though it was officially ruled an accidental drowning, his friends in Germany suspected his death was a suicide and his family in the U.S. claimed he had been murdered.

Reed's suicide note was later found on the back of a screenplay in his car. In it, Reed expressed his regret about his crumbling relationship with his third wife. He apologised to Erich Honecker, General Secretary of the SED, for his actions which could have resulted in a bad image for the GDR. The note was put into state files as classified information, which did not resurface until after German reunification. Eberhard Fensch, who was addressed in the note, later said "The reason was to spare his wife's feelings. There was no other reason. The letter even contained a greeting to Erich Honecker. Why would we cover that up?"

In 2004, Russia's Rossiya television channel aired a documentary on Dean Reed, entitled Кто Вы, мистер Рид? (Who Are You, Mister Reed?), speculating on the possibilities of him having been a CIA, KGB or Stasi agent, but failing to present any concrete evidence to support any such theories. Between 1976 and 1978, he worked for the Stasi's international department according to a 2005 book.

== Filmography ==
- 1964: Love Has Many Faces (USA)
- 1965: Mi primera novia (Аrgentina)
- 1965: Guadalajara en verano (Mexico)
- 1965: Ritmo nuevo y vieja ola (Аrgentina)
- 1967: God Made Them... I Kill Them (Italy)
- 1967: Buckaroo: The Winchester Does Not Forgive (Italy)
- 1968: The Nephews of Zorro (Italy)
- 1969: Il diario proibito di Fanny (Italy)
- 1969: Mitra Baby Face (Italy)
- 1969: Death Knocks Twice (Italy, West Germany)
- 1970: Veinte pasos para la muerte (Italy, Spain)
- 1970: La banda de los tres crisantemos (Spain, Italy)
- 1970: Adiós, Sabata (Italy, USA, Spain)
- 1971: Los Corsarios / I pirati dell'isola verde (Italy, Spain)
- 1971: La stirpe di Caino (Italy)
- 1971: Die Vergnügungsspalte (West Germany) (uses parts of Il diario proibito di Fanny)
- 1973: Storia di karat`e, pugni e fagioli (Spain, Italy)
- 1973: Excerpts from the Life of a Good-For-Nothing (East Germany)
- 1974: Kit & Co (East Germany, USSR, CSSR)
- 1975: Blood Brothers (East Germany)
- 1976: Soviel Lieder, soviel Worte (East Germany, USSR)
- 1978: El Cantor (East Germany)
- 1981: Sing, Cowboy, Sing (East Germany)
- 1984: Uindii / Races (Japan, West Germany)

== Legacy ==
The University of Colorado Boulder sponsors the Dean Reed Peace Prize, an annual essay contest held in Reed's memory.

== Media depictions ==
Reed's life is the subject of the documentary American Rebel: The Dean Reed Story (1985).

Reed's life story influenced Grammy Award-winning writer and comedian Lewis Black and composer Rusty Magee to create the musical The Czar of Rock and Roll. It chronicled the rise of a Reed-like character, Eugene Reeves, from Nebraska musician to Soviet superstar. The musical was first produced in New York City at the West Bank Café Downstairs Theater Bar in 1989 and then at the Alley Theater in Houston in 1990. In April 2009 a concert version of the musical, directed by Evan Cabnet, was produced at Joe's Pub in New York City.

In 1991 Tom Hanks optioned a biography by Reggie Nadelson, titled Comrade Rockstar, finally published in the U.S. by Walker & Company in 2006. Nadelson had been inspired to write her book after seeing the 60 Minutes broadcast. Hanks planned to produce a movie on Reed's life. In 1993, Dean Reed – Glamour und Protest was released, in 2007 Der Rote Elvis (The Red Elvis) and Gringo Rojo (2016).

In 2001, English singer-songwriter Steve Bush published the song "Salome for Dean Reed" on the album Blossom Freak.

In January 2022, Sky UK broadcast a documentary about the life of Dean Reed on their channel Sky Documentaries titled Red Elvis, Cold War Cowboy. CuriosityStream and Amazon Prime are also streaming the documentary.
