= Matalo! =

1970 film

- Directed by: Cesare Canevari
- Written by: Mino Roli; Nino Ducci; Eduardo M. Brochero
- Cinematography: Julio Ortas
- Music by: Mario Migliardi
- Release date: 1970
- Countries: Italy; Spain
- Language: Italian

Matalo! (also spelled as Mátalo) is a 1970 Italian spaghetti Western film directed by Cesare Canevari.

The film is considered among the most original western ever produced in Italy. It is characterized from a greater weight given to psychology over action, an almost total lack of dialogues, an innovative soundtrack and the use by the lead character of a boomerang as his only weapon.

It was shown as part of a retrospective on Spaghetti Western at the 64th Venice International Film Festival.

== Cast ==
- Corrado Pani: Burt
- Lou Castel: Ray, the stranger
- Antonio Salines: Theo
- Claudia Gravy: Mary
- Ana María Noé: Constance Benson
- Luis Dávila: Phil
- Diana Sorel
