= Claus Wilcke =

German actor

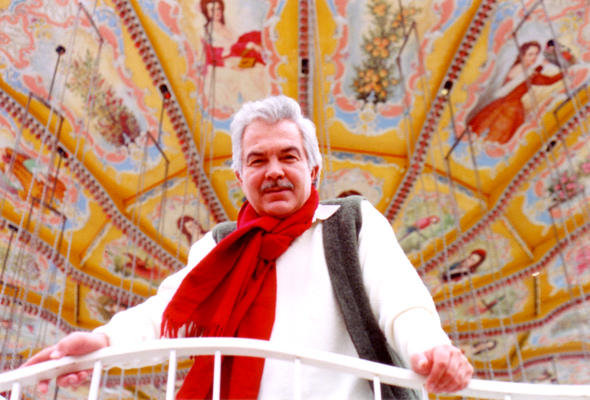
- Born: Claus Wilcke; 12 August 1939 (age 87); Bremen, Germany
- Occupations: Actor voice dubber
- Years active: 1982–present
- Children: Nicolas and Alexandra

Claus Wilcke (born 12 August 1939, in Bremen) is a German actor who has played Americans in the German TV shows Percy Stuart and I.O.B. Spezialauftrag. He has also dubbed many American actors including Elvis Presley and Michael Landon for cinema and TV. He has won several German awards.

== Career ==
Wilcke started as a stage actor. He passed a complete classic training and graduated. He was trained for stunts in London and played many sports such as fencing and riding. In 1958, he appeared for the first time on the big screen. After 20 feature films, he was cast as the title role on Percy Stuart. Nearly all of his stunts were done by himself because the insurance companies back then didn't hinder him.

Later Wilcke played roles in numerous other German TV shows and on very many theatre stages all over Germany. He is also a very sought-after voice-over actor. In 2012, he had a cameo appearance in Iron Sky where he is the white-bearded politician at the international conference who repeatedly laughs at the fictitious president of the United States until he gets angry and throws a shoe at her.

== Personal life ==
Wilcke is married and has two children, Nicolas and Alexandra.

== Selected filmography ==
- My Ninety Nine Brides (1958)
- Love Now, Pay Later (1959)
- Crime After School (1959)
- The Day the Rains Came (1959)
- Stage Fright (1960)
- Mit 17 weint man nicht (1960)
- The Girl with the Narrow Hips (1961)
- Via Mala (1961)
- Freddy and the Millionaire (1961)
- Café Oriental (1962)
- When Ludwig Goes on Manoeuvres (1967)
- Percy Stuart (1969–1972, TV series)
- I.O.B. Spezialauftrag (1980–1981, TV series)
- Sylter Geschichten (1993–1995, TV series)
- Verbotene Liebe (2011–2012, TV series)
- Iron Sky (2012)
- Unter uns (2018–2019, TV series)
