= Dollar of Fire =

1966 film

- Directed by: Nick Nostro
- Written by: Miguel María Astrain Bada; Iquino Colucci; Ignacio F. Iquino; Mikky Roberts; Herbert Williams
- Starring: Miguel de la Riva; Dada Gallotti; Alberto Farnese
- Cinematography: Víctor Monreal; Julian Rosenthal
- Edited by: Teresa Alcocer
- Music by: Enrique Escobar
- Production companies: Cinematografica Associati; Ignacio Ferrés Iquino
- Release date: 10 March 1966
- Running time: 79 minutes
- Countries: Italy; Spain
- Languages: Italian; Spanish

Dollar of Fire/Epitaph for a Fast Gun (Italian: Un dollaro di fuoco, Spanish: Un dólar de fuego) is a 1966 Italian-Spanish western film directed by Nick Nostro and starring Miguel de la Riva, Dada Gallotti and Alberto Farnese.

== Cast ==
- Miguel de la Riva as Sheriff Sid/Kelly Brady
- Dada Gallotti as Nora Kenton
- Alberto Farnese as Senator Dana Harper
- Diana Sorel as Nora Kendall
- Gaspar 'Indio' González as Blacky 'Spider' Kendall/Sam Dollar
- Javier Conde
- Gustavo Re as a postmaster
- Mario Via
- Fernando Rubio as a banker
- Juan Manuel Simón
- Angelica Ott as Liz Kelly
- Carlos Otero as Judge Lang
- Joaquín Blanco as Sandy
- César Ojinaga as Ericson
- Eduardo Lizarza
- Teresa Giro
- Moisés Augusto Rocha as Henchman
- Jesús Redondo
- Alfonso Castro
- Gabriel Giménez
- Miguel Muniesa
- María Zaldívar
- Roberto Font
- Mario Maranzana

== Bibliography ==
- Thomas Weisser. Spaghetti Westerns--the Good, the Bad and the Violent: A Comprehensive, Illustrated Filmography of 558 Eurowesterns and Their Personnel, 1961-1977. McFarland, 2005.
