= Diana Sorel (actress) =

Spanish actress (born 1946)

- Born: 3 August 1946 (age 79); Comunidad de Madrid, Spain
- Other name: Laura Jimeno
- Occupation: Actress
- Years active: 1966-

Diana Sorel (born Laura Jimeno in 1946) is a Spanish actress. She starred in a number of Spanish spaghetti westerns and dramas, and is known to horror film fans for her roles in two important Spanish horror films, Los Monstruos del Terror and La llamada del vampiro.

== Selected filmography ==
- Dollar of Fire (1966)
- The Tough One (1966)
- El Padre Manolo (1967)
- La playa de las seducciones (1967)
- S.O.S. Invasion (1969)
- Los Monstruos del Terror (1970) starring Paul Naschy
- Matalo! (1970)
- La llamada del vampiro''/ ''Call of the Vampire (1972)
- What Am I Doing in the Middle of a Revolution? (1972)

== Bibliography ==
- Thomas Weisser. Spaghetti Westerns--the Good, the Bad and the Violent: A Comprehensive, Illustrated Filmography of 558 Eurowesterns and Their Personnel, 1961–1977. McFarland, 2005.
