= Long Vacations of 36 =

- Spanish film poster
- Directed by: Jaime Camino
- Written by: Jaime Camino; Manuel Gutiérrez Aragón
- Produced by: José Frade
- Starring: Concha Velasco; José Sacristán; Francisco Rabal; Ángela Molina
- Cinematography: Fernando Arribas
- Edited by: Teresa Alcocer
- Music by: Xavier Montsalvatge
- Release date: 28 October 1976
- Running time: 102 minutes
- Country: Spain
- Language: Spanish

Long Vacations of 36 (Spanish: Las largas vacaciones del 36) is a 1976 Spanish drama film directed by Jaime Camino dealing with the effects of Spanish Civil War on a bourgeois family trapped by the conflict in a tourist village near Barcelona.

The film won three awards at the 26th Berlin International Film Festival: FIPRESCI Prize, Interfilm Award – Recommendation, and UNICRIT Award – Honorable Mention.

The original ending (Franco's cavalry entry in the village, intentionally showed as a blurred image) was cut by Spanish censorship of that time. The film ends with all the Republicans marching to exile, and the fascist couple waiting at home.

== Plot ==
In the summer of 1936, the beginning of the Spanish Civil War, a bourgeois family with many children, spending their holiday near Barcelona, tries to remain neutral between the Republicans and the supporters of General Francisco Franco. But the war changes the lives of all.

== Cast ==
- Analía Gadé as Virginia
- Ismael Merlo as El Abuelo
- Ángela Molina as Encarna
- Vicente Parra as Paco
- Francisco Rabal as El Maestro
- José Sacristán as Jorge
- Charo Soriano as Rosita
- Concha Velasco as Mercedes
- José Vivó as Alberto
