= Seven Pistols for a Gringo =

1966 film

- Film poster
- Spanish: Río maldito
- Directed by: Juan Xiol Marchal
- Written by: Roberto Bianchi Montero; Ignacio F. Iquino
- Screenplay by: Alberto Colucci
- Story by: Peter Kenn
- Starring: Gérard Landry; Dan Harrison
- Cinematography: Julio Pérez de Rozas
- Edited by: Maricel Bautista
- Music by: Enrique Escobar
- Production companies: Cinematografica Associati; I.F.I. España S.A.
- Distributed by: Paradise Film Exchange; Sánchez Ramade
- Release dates: 23 July 1966 (Italy); 11 November 1966 (Madrid)
- Running time: 85 min
- Countries: Spain; Italy

Seven Pistols for a Gringo (Spanish: Río maldito or Siete pistolas para un gringo) is a 1966 Spanish/Italian western film directed by Juan Xiol Marchal. It was written by Alberto Colucci, Ignacio Iquino and Roberto Bianchi Montero, and scored by Enrique Escobar. It stars Gerard Landry, Don Harrison, Fernando Rubio, Alberto Farnese, Alberto Gadea, Juan Manuel Simón, César Ojinaga and Gustavo Re.

== Cast ==
- Gérard Landry
- Dan Harrison
- Fernando Rubio
- Alberto Farnese
- Juan Manuel Simón
- César Ojinaga
- Gustavo Re
- José Ma Pinillo
- Patricia Loran
- Eduardo Lizarza
- Víctor Vilanova
- Teresa Giro
- Marta May
- Gaspar Gonzalez
- Alberto Llosa Gadea
