= Red Blood, Yellow Gold =

1967 film

- Directed by: Nando Cicero
- Written by: Jaime Jesús Balcázar; Enzo Dell'Aquila; Roberto Gianviti; José Antonio de la Loma
- Starring: George Hilton
- Cinematography: Francisco Marín
- Music by: Carlos Pes
- Production company: Colt Produzioni Cinematografiche
- Release date: 1967
- Countries: Italy; Spain
- Language: Italian

Red Blood, Yellow Gold (Italian: Professionisti per un massacro, Spanish: Los profesionales de la muerte, also known as Professionals for a Massacre), is a 1967 Italian-Spanish Spaghetti Western film directed by Nando Cicero.

== Cast ==
- George Hilton: Steel Downey
- Edd Byrnes: Chattanooga Jim
- George Martin: Fidel Ramirez
- Milo Quesada: Lieutenant Logan
- Mónica Randall: Annie
- Gérard Herter: Major Lloyd
- José Bódalo: Pietro Primero
- Gisella Monaldi: Luisa
- Carlo Gentili: General Sibley

== Plot ==
Confederate Major Lloyd and some accomplices desert with a Gatling gun and a shipment of gold. General Sibley sends Lt. Tennessee Logan, together with three Confederate soldiers about to be executed for theft – horse-thief Ramirez, defrocked priest and dynamite expert Steel Downey, and bank robber Chattanooga Jim. They set up an ambush for Lloyd, but the three others ditch Logan and go for the gold, only to find it snatched by the Mexican Camiseros gang. They ally with Lloyd against the Camiseros and then blow up Lloyd and his men, only to be intercepted by a Union troop led by Logan, who is a Union spy. The heroes manage to exterminate the Union men but are stopped by a Confederate troop led by General Sibley, who had suspected Logan but needed proof. The three are given horses and warned not to show themselves in these parts. When Sibley later hands over the gold to the Mexican army in exchange for weapons the three companions, now dressed in ponchos, suddenly drive off with the wagon, pursued by the Mexicans.

== Reception ==
In his investigation of narrative structures in Spaghetti Western films, Fridlund compares Red Blood, Yellow Gold to other stories of multiple betrayals between protagonists for monetary reasons, inspired by The Good, the Bad and the Ugly, the main difference being that in this case the "hero" trio sticks together.

== Releases ==
Wild East released this alongside Payment in Blood in an out-of-print limited edition R0 NTSC DVD in 2008.
