= Jaime Camino =

Spanish film director

- Born: 11 June 1936; Barcelona, Spain
- Died: 4 December 2015 (aged 79); Barcelona, Spain
- Occupations: Film director Screenwriter
- Years active: 1962–2001

Jaime Camino (11 June 1936 – 4 December 2015) was a Spanish film director and screenwriter. He directed 16 films between 1962 and 2001. His 1976 film Long Vacations of 36 was entered into the 26th Berlin International Film Festival. His 1992 film The Long Winter was entered into the 42nd Berlin International Film Festival.

== Filmography ==
- Los niños de Rusia (2001)
- El largo invierno (1992)
- Luces y sombras (1988)
- Dragon rapide (1986)
- El balcón abierto (1984)
- La campanada (1980)
- La vieja memoria (1979)
- Las largas vacaciones del 36 (1976)
- Mi profesora particular (1973)
- España otra vez (1969)
- Jutrzenka (1969)
- Copa Davis-1965 (1966)
- Mañana será otro día (1966)
- Los felices sesenta (1963)
- Centauros 1962 (1962)
- El toro, vida y muerte (1962)
