= Man from Canyon City =

1965 film

- Film poster
- Directed by: Alfonso Balcázar
- Written by: Attilio Riccio; Adriano Bolzoni
- Cinematography: Aldo Scavarda
- Music by: Angelo Francesco Lavagnino
- Release date: 1965
- Countries: Spain; Italy
- Language: Spanish

Man from Canyon City (Spanish: ¡Viva Carrancho!, Italian: L'uomo che viene da Canyon City) is a 1965 Spanish-Italian Spaghetti Western film directed by Alfonso Balcázar.

== Plot ==
This is the story of two prisoners Carrancho and Rad chained together and escape from jail. The joined in an outfit of Morgan, a ruthless mine owner. One works as henchman and another become the cook.

== Cast ==
- Robert Woods as Morgan
- Fernando Sancho as Carrancho
- Luis Dávila as Red
- Ryan Baldwyn as Grieves
- Lore Nushak as Viviane Barrett
- Gérard Tichy as Hargitay, Government Inspector
- Antonio Molino Rojo as Matt
- Óscar Carreras
- Paco Sanz as Minero
- José Manuel Martín as Esteban
- Antonio Almorós as Manuel Pereda
- Ely Drago as Rosario
- Victor Fuentes
- Jean Osvald as Empleado
- Gaspar González as Sheriff
- A. Malla
- César Ojinaga as Fred Bogart
- Carlos Otero as Mejicano
- Óscar Pellicer
- Juan Miguel Solano
- Renato Terra
- Asunción Vitoria as Cocinera
- Juan Fernández as Telegraphist

== See also ==
- Five Thousand Dollars on One Ace
