= Five Thousand Dollars on One Ace =

1965 film

- Directed by: Alfonso Balcázar
- Written by: Alfonso Balcázar; Sandro Continenza
- Produced by: Alfonso Balcázar; Edmondo Amati
- Cinematography: Roberto Reale
- Music by: Angelo Francesco Lavagnino
- Release date: 1964
- Countries: Spain, Italy, West Germany
- Language: Spanish

Five Thousand Dollars on One Ace (Spanish: Los Pistoleros de Arizona) is a 1964 Spanish Spaghetti Western film directed by Alfonso Balcázar, scored by Angelo Francesco Lavagnino and Don Powell, and starring Robert Woods, Fernando Sancho and Helmut Schmid.

== Cast ==
- Robert Woods as Jeff Clayton
- Fernando Sancho as Carrancho
- Maria Sebaldt as Helen Greenwood
- Giacomo Rossi Stuart as David Greenwood
- Helmut Schmid as Rossen
- Richard Häussler as Dundee
- Hans Nielsen as juez Keystone
- Antonio Molino Rojo as Dingus
- Lorenzo Robledo (as Norman Preston)
- Jaime Avellán as Benson
- Miguel de la Riva as Don
- Nino Persello as Gitano Jack
- Francisco Sanz as Craig
- Pedro Gil as Sheriff
- César Ojinaga as Glenn, Dueño del rancho
- Fernando Rubio as Fulgencio
- Alberto Gadea as Hombre de Don
- Carlos Hurtado as Hombre de Don
- Juan Torres as Peter Peabody
- Rafael Anglada as Tendero
- Francisco García López in a bit part
- José Castellví
- Remo De Angelis
- Juan Fernández as Sandy el pianista
- Barbara Frey as Chica del saloon
- Eduardo Lizarza as Sheriff de Tucson

== Plot ==
The gambler Jeff Clayton wins a deed to half a ranch (against a pot of $5.000). The loser draws his gun and is shot.

Jeff finds Carrancho bound to the ground, left by his companions to die of thirst. Carrancho is set free, and in return saves Jeff from a snake with an expert knife throw. Jeff then helps him up on his horse only to see Carrancho ride off with all his money, leaving him only with the deed. As he walks through the desert landscape Jeff finds two dead man bound to the ground, apparently Carrancho's former friends. He takes one of the horses and eventually reaches a town.

In town he sees the judge and the sheriff going away on business. He then recognizes Rossen, a former outlaw, who harasses a farmer family whose farm he has bought.

As the deed is all that Jeff has got left and that ranch is in the neighborhood he goes there to claim his part. The other owners – Helen and her brother David – do not welcome their new partner. Instead Helen runs him off with a rifle.

Back in town he offers the deed to Rossen, who rejects his asking price. Jeff sees Helen in town talking to the lawyer Dundee.

In the saloon two of Rossen's men win in poker with the help of a mirror behind their opponent. Jeff takes his place, offering the deed as security for the play. He wins with a card hand different from the one just seen in the mirror, and then shoots the thing to pieces. There is a fistfight between him and the two men. When one of them raises a gun he is killed by a knife in the back, thrown by Carrancho. Jeff answers his friendly greeting by knocking him out of the window and then asking for his money and horse. Carrancho has lost all at poker. Jeff takes the money Carrancho has (which he had stolen from Jeff's poker pot during the fight). Carrancho tries to placate him by suggesting that they rob the bank together, but Jeff rejects the idea.

Rossen and his men try to coerce Helan and David to sell their ranch, when Jeff and Carrancho appear. Now Jeff rejects an offer from Rossen to buy his deed.

Rossen is acting as a front for Dundee. Rossen sets fire to the ranch and Dundee turns Helen against Jeff by blaming him (who has helped them save the horses and the house).

Carrancho breaks into the bank only to witness Rossen murder the banker and then blame David. Jeff saves David from Rossen's lynch mob and then pretends to shoot him.

Jeff recognizes Carrancho's knife left at the bank and finds the Mexican leading a stage hold up. His gang robs the passengers, when interrupted by a shot from Jeff. There is a fight between bandits and passengers (in the mud), while Jeff overtakes the escaping Carrancho. After being caught, Carrancho relates what he saw in the bank, but is reluctant to appear in front of a judge to testify. Jeff insists that they must save David.

Rossen's men lie in ambush for Jeff and Carrancho in the mountains. Their coyote signals make Jeff suspicious. When the two are fired upon the Mexican hails it as the work of his own men, but soon discovers that he is also a target. They manage to sneak around the men and strike them down. Two other ambushers further down the pass hear the coyote signal and shoot two men riding on horses. When they come down they discover the dead bodies of their own comrades. Jeff and Carrancho appear behind them and take their guns. Carrancho now turns his rifle on Jeff, but Jeff has seen to it that it is empty.

The two arrive at the ranch to confront and kill men sent by Dundee to look for David (Helen had told the lawyer that her brother was alive). In town Jeff kills Rossen in a gunfight while Carrancho and David shoots two men who were lying in ambush. Dundee appears with Helen at gunpoint and tells them to drop their guns. He tells Carrancho to throw his knife away and the Mexican throws it into his chest!

The judge and the sheriff return and ask if anything has happened. Carrancho helps the judge down from the carriage. He says goodbye to Jeff and Helen and presents Jeff with "his father's watch" as a gift. As they see him ride off the judge asks Jeff why he has his watch!

== Reception ==
In his investigation of narrative structures in Spaghetti Western films, Fridlund writes that beneath the smooth string of action scenes in Los Pistoleros de Arizona a classical US Western plot - about a stranger protecting settlers against the villains - coexists with a different story: the unstable partnership between Jeff and Carrancho - appearing one year before For a Few Dollars More made this a standard theme in Spaghetti Western films.

== See also ==
- Man from Canyon City (1965), with Fernando Sancho as Carrancho
