= Aldecoa =

Surname list

Aldecoa is a surname of Spanish origin. Notable people with this surname include:

- Agustin de Jáuregui y Aldecoa (died 1784), Spanish politician and soldier
- Emilio Aldecoa (1922–1999), Spanish professional footballer
- Ignacio Aldecoa (1925–1969), Spanish writer
- Josefina Aldecoa (1926–2011), Spanish writer and teacher
