= José Luis Madrid =

Spanish screenwriter, producer and film director

José Luis Madrid de la Viña
- Born: 11 April 1933; Madrid, Spain
- Died: 19 July 1999 (aged 66); Marbella, Spain
- Other name: Pepe Madrid
- Occupations: Film director, screenwriter, film producer
- Years active: 1959-1984 (film)

José Luis Madrid (11 April 1933 – 19 July 1999) was a Spanish screenwriter, producer and film director.

== Selected filmography ==
- Ruthless Colt of the Gringo (1966)
- Who Killed Johnny R.? (1966)
- Somebody's Stolen Our Russian Spy (1967)
- El Vampiro de la Autopista (1971) aka The Horrible Sexy Vampire
- Seven Murders for Scotland Yard (1971) aka Jack the Ripper of London (starred Paul Naschy)
- The Crimes of Petiot (1973) starred Paul Naschy
- Last Tango in Madrid (1975)
- English Striptease (1975)
- Muerte de un Presidente (Death of a President) (1977) starred Paul Naschy
- Invierno en Marbella (1983)

== Bibliography ==
- Goble, Alan. The Complete Index to Literary Sources in Film. Walter de Gruyter, 1999.
