= Stagecoach of the Condemned =

1970 Spanish film directed by Juan Bosch

- Film poster
- Spanish: La diligencia de los condenados
- Directed by: Juan Bosch
- Screenplay by: Ignacio F. Iquino; Luciano Martino; Juliana San José de la Fuente
- Story by: Luciano Martino
- Based on: Based on the novel by Lou Carrigan
- Produced by: Ignacio F. Iquino
- Cinematography: Luciano Trasatti
- Edited by: Eugenio Alabiso; Antonio Graciani; Luis Puigvert
- Music by: Enrique Escobar
- Production companies: Devon Film; IFI Producción S.A.
- Distributed by: IFISA
- Release date: 6 August 1970 (Italy)
- Running time: 85 min
- Country: Spain

Stagecoach of the Condemned (Spanish: La diligencia de los condenados) is a 1970 Spanish western film directed by Juan Bosch. It is produced and written by Ignacio F. Iquino, scored by Enrique Escobar and starring Bruno Corazzari, Erika Blanc, Fernando Sancho and Richard Harrison.

== Cast ==
- Richard Harrison as Robert Walton
- Fernando Sancho as Ramón Sartana
- Erika Blanc as Martha Walton
- Bruno Corazzari as Anthony Stevens
- Gustavo Re as John McCandy
- Fernando Rubio as Pedro
- José Ignacio Abadal as Martin LeRoy
- Alberto Severi
- Elena Pironti as Elizabeth Patricks
- Juan Torres as Jeremy Foster
- Joaquín Germán
- Indio González as Voss
- Maria Cinthia Rosello as Joanna Patricks
- Alberto Tazza
- Francesco Pellegrini
- Ángel Lombarte as Patterson
- Juan Miguel Solano as Cowboy
- Florencio Calpe as Herbert Green
- Nano Martín
- Leontine May as Kidnapped Blonde
- Fernando de Miragaya as Cowboy
- Antonio Molino Rojo as Buchanan
- Ricardo Moyán as Brett Hudson
- Miguel Muniesa as Judge
- César Ojinaga as Frederick
- Juan Patiño as Cowboy
