= Spain Again =

1969 film

- Film poster
- Directed by: Jaime Camino
- Written by: Román Gubern; Jaime Camino; Alvah Bessie
- Produced by: Jaime Fernández-Cid
- Starring: Manuela Vargas
- Cinematography: Luis Cuadrado
- Edited by: Teresa Alcocer
- Release date: 3 February 1969
- Running time: 108 minutes
- Country: Spain
- Language: Spanish

Spain Again (Spanish: España otra vez) is a 1969 Spanish drama film directed by Jaime Camino. It was entered into the 1969 Cannes Film Festival. The film was also selected as the Spanish entry for the Best Foreign Language Film at the 41st Academy Awards, but was not accepted as a nominee.

== Cast ==
- Manuela Vargas – María
- Mark Stevens – Dr. David Foster
- Marianne Koch – Kathy Foster
- Enrique Giménez 'El Cojo' – Maestro Miguel (as Enrique 'el cojo')
- Luis Serret – Manuel Oliver
- Luis Ciges – Padre Jacinto (as Luis Cijes)
- Joaquín Pujol – Hijo de Manuel
- Alberto Berco – Dr. Gavotty
- Alberto Puig – Dr. Tomás (as Alberto Puig Palau)
- Flor de Bethania Abreu – Teresa (as Flor de Bethania A.T.C.)
- Manuel Muñiz – Hombre Extraño (as Pajarito)

== See also ==
- List of submissions to the 41st Academy Awards for Best Foreign Language Film
- List of Spanish submissions for the Academy Award for Best Foreign Language Film
