= The Long Winter (1992 film) =

- Directed by: Jaime Camino
- Written by: Jaime Camino
- Produced by: Jaime Camino
- Starring: Vittorio Gassman
- Release date: 15 February 1992
- Running time: 135 minutes
- Countries: Spain; France
- Language: Spanish

The Long Winter (Spanish: El largo invierno) is a 1992 French–Spanish drama film directed by Jaime Camino and starring Vittorio Gassman, Elizabeth Hurley and Jacques Penot. It depicts a middle-class Catalan family during the Spanish Civil War. The film was entered into the 42nd Berlin International Film Festival.

== Cast ==
- Vittorio Gassman as Claudio
- Jacques Penot as Ramón Casals
- Elizabeth Hurley as Emma Stapleton
- Jean Rochefort as Jordi Casals
- Adolfo Marsillach as Casimiro Casals
- José Luis López Vázquez as Tio Paco
- Asunción Balaguer as Assumpta de Casals
- Teresa Gimpera as Lola de Casals
- Ramon Madaula as Simi Casals
- Àlex Casanovas as Fernando Casals
- Judit Mascó as Mercedes Casals
- Jordan Giralt as Juanito Casals
- Yaiza Pérez as Flora Casals
- Sergi Mateu as Ramon Casals Jr.
- Sílvia Munt as Amelia
- José Luis de Vilallonga as Conde de Santbenet
- Hermann Bonnin as Walter
