= Alfonso Balcázar =

Spanish screenwriter

- Born: 2 March 1926; Barcelona, Spain
- Died: 28 December 1993 (aged 67); Sitges, Catalonia, Spain
- Occupations: Screenwriter; Film director Film producer
- Years active: 1960-1984

Alfonso Balcázar Granda (2 March 1926 – 28 December 1993) was a Spanish screenwriter, film director and producer. He wrote for 46 films between 1958 and 1983. He also directed 30 films between 1960 and 1984. He was born and died in Barcelona, Catalonia, Spain.

== Selected filmography ==
- Eleven Pairs of Boots (1954)
- Count Max (1957, directed by Giorgio Bianchi)
- Alfonso XII and María Cristina (1960)
- The Crossroads (1959)
- The Lovely Lola (1962)
- Spartacus and the Ten Gladiators (1964, directed by Nick Nostro)
- A Pistol for Ringo (1965, directed by Duccio Tessari)
- Agent 3S3: Passport to Hell (1965, directed by Sergio Sollima)
- Five Thousand Dollars on One Ace (1965)
- Man from Canyon City (1965)
- Doc, Hands of Steel (1965)
- Yankee (1966, directed by Tinto Brass)
- Cuatro dólares de venganza (1966)
- Clint the Stranger (1967)
- Electra One (1967)
- The Return of Clint the Stranger (1972)
- Judas... ¡toma tus monedas! (1972)
