= Manuel Esteba =

Spanish director

- Born: Manuel Esteba i Gallego; April 17, 1941; Barcelona
- Died: February 4, 2010 (aged 68); Barcelona
- Occupation(s): Film director and screenwriter

Manuel Esteba (17 April 1941 – 4 February 2010) was a Spanish director and screenwriter, notable for writing a spoof of Steven Spielberg's E.T. the Extra-Terrestrial called El E.T.E. y el Oto.

== Career ==
Manuel Esteba was active as a director and a screenwriter for 30 years beginning in the 1960s. Credits include Saranda in the 1970s, also known as Twenty Paces to Death, starring Dean Reed, and A Cry of Death, starring Pierre Brice and Steven Tedd. As a director, he worked with the Calatrava Brothers on 3 comedies. In 1992, he wrote and directed a documentary called Un jardinero en tu casa, with Julian Silvestre as host.

== Death ==
Manuel Esteba died on 4 February 2010 at the age of 68 in Barcelona, Spain.
