= Percy Stuart =

- Genre: Adventure
- Created by: Karl Heinz Zeitler
- Starring: Claus Wilcke; Horst Keitel
- Theme music composer: Siegfried Franz
- Opening theme: Siegfried Franz
- Composer: Siegfried Franz
- Country of origin: West Germany
- Original language: German
- No. of seasons: 4
- No. of episodes: 52

Production
- Executive producer: Horst Lockau
- Running time: 25
- Production company: Hamburgische Film- und Fernsehproduktion

Original release
- Release: 19 March 1969 – 19 January 1972

Percy Stuart is a German television series which was aired from 1969 to 1972.

== Synopsis ==
Percy Stuart tried to fulfill his father's last wish by becoming a member of his father's English club and in order to get accepted he has to prove that he is worthy. Since some of the members do not like the idea he is confronted by a number of actually impossible missions. Whenever he fails them once he has start all over again. On his missions he is accompanied and observed by solicitor Reginald Prewster (Horst Keitel) who always eventually has to report to the club how it went.

== Protagonist ==
Percy Stuart is self-confident and venturesome yet remains a son who respects his fathers wishes. His father, for his part, appears to have offended the more conservativem members of the Eccentric Club by leaving England in order to make a fortune in the New World, and still more, by succeeding in doing so. Even when some of the club members act repeatedly downright grumpy, Percy Stuart would always remain nonchalant.

== The Eccentric Club ==
It is hardly a coincidence to find Snyder, Pommeroy and Winterbottom among the names of the members. Their names are familiar to the West German public thanks to the comedy sketch Dinner For One and were so already back then. When the series about Percy Stuart started, the sketch was already famous in West Germany, that even after several decades it is still broadcast on every New Year's Eve. To combine clichés about Britons had already been a formula for the success of the German Edgar Wallace feature films.

=== Cast of the Eccentric Club ===
- Robert Meyn: Sir John Cleveland
- Kurt Beeken: Mr. Fitzgerald
- Ulrich Beiger: Colonel Snyder
- Georg Eilert: Judge Lord Archibald Parkinson
- Gerhard Frickhöffer: Mr. George Pommeroy
- Friedrich Hartau: Mr. Joshua Brown
- Kurt Klopsch: Mr. Grover
- Albert Lippert: General William McLean
- Alf Marholm: Mr. Beverly
- Otto Preuss: Mr. Winterbottom
- Helmuth von Scheven: Lord Hamilton
- Otto Stern: Sir Richard Cavendish
- Curt Timm: Sir Robert Callaghan
- Günter Lüdke: Butler James

== Comparisons ==
Due to the typical content of the show, which included a great deal of action, Percy Stuart acquired the nickname "The German James Bond".

== Literary source ==
The character of Percy Stuart was created for the dime novel series Lord Percy vom Excentric Club. Der Held und kühne Abenteurer in 197 geheimnisvollen Aufgaben ("Lord Percy of the Excentric Club. The Hero and Daring Adventurer in 197 Mysterious Tasks"), which was published from 1913 to 1916. The series described his colourful efforts to become accepted as member of a lodge called the "Excentric Club", which consisted of high-ranking military officers and civil servants and other influential members of the British upper class. Percy Stuart was the glorification of the British gentleman and his missions could sometimes be described as one-man raids. At the outset of WWI, Percy Stuart was changed into an American millionaire. When the USA started supporting the UK, the government prohibited further publication, ending the series with issue 131.

Beginning in 1920, the series was republished under the title Der neue Excentric-Club - Spannende Sport-Geschichten ("The New Excentric Club - Exciting Sports Stories"). The success led to the series being continued with new stories, ending with issue 534. A 1950 attempt at reissuing the series in 1950 ended after a single issue.

== Anglophile-German television audience ==
The television show about Percy Stuart was a product of the German zeitgeist of that time, when films and television shows featuring Anglo-Saxon protagonists had proven successful. Actor Heinz Rühmann had already played Dr. Watson once and Father Brown twice.

Also very profitable was a German series of 32 feature films produced by Rialto, all based on Edgar Wallace's novels. On television, the series The Avengers or "With Umbrella, Charm and Bowler Hat" (translated from the German title "Mit Schirm, Charme und Melone") was perceived with enthusiasm, had countless re-runs, and is still celebrated today. Shows like The Saint (in Germany: "Simon Templar") or Danger Man (in Germany: "John Drake") also found their audience.

German television had also successfully adapted various books of Francis Durbridge. Each Durbridge adaptation was called a "Straßenfeger" (street-emptier) because there would not be anybody left in the streets when they were broadcast.

== Becoming a television legend ==
After fifty-two episodes which were often physically demanding even for the athletically skilled Claus Wilcke, and which moreover had to be produced within tight schemes and budgets, its star Claus Wilcke turned his back on the increasingly more violent show, decided to return to stage acting. He later worked as a voice-over actor. Besides all that, he is a guest star for some of the current television series. His co-star Horst Keitel acted a little later in a similar television show called Im Auftrag von Madame ("By Order Of Madame"), and Butler Parker, another pulp fiction protagonist, who also entered the television screen (1972–73) but at last it was evidently proven that the television show "Percy Stuart" and its success had been sui generis.

== DVD release ==
In 2009, a restored version of this series was published. The DVD collection is enriched by documentaries and interviews.
