= Ángel Lombarte =

Spanish actor

Ángel Lombarte is a Spanish actor.

He appeared in La piel quemada, The Blood Spattered Bride (1972), starring Simón Andreu, Maribel Martin, Alexandra Bastedo and Dean Selmier; La collera del vento (1970), starring Maria Grazia Buccella and Terence Hill, and Frauds (1963), both directed by Mario Camus; Trigo limpio (1962), and The Shame of the Sabine Women (1962), by Alberto Gout.

== Filmography ==
- La ley del karate en el Oeste (1973) as Gunman
- The Killer with a Thousand Eyes (1972)
- The Blood Spattered Bride (1972) as Carol's father
- They Believed He Was No Saint (1972) as Melquiades
- God in Heaven... Arizona on Earth (1971)
- Four Candles for Garringo (1971) as Oswald Employee
- Trinity Sees Red (1970) as José
- Stagecoach of the Condemned (1970) as Patterson
- Ley de raza (1970) as Manuel
- Twenty Paces to Death (1970)
- Volver a vivir (1968)
- Gentleman Killer (1967) as Mexican Officer
- La piel quemada (1967) as Andrés
- Texas Kid (1966) as Second Poker Player
- Five Dollars for Ringo (1966) as Deputy Charlie Scott
- Con el viento solano (1966) as Maño, el tabernero
- 4 Dollars of Revenge (1966) as Ayudante del Sheriff
- La otra orilla (1965)
- Tumba para un forajido (1965) as John
- Muere una mujer (1965) as
- Guns of Nevada (1965) as Jim
- Vivir un largo invierno (1964) as Juan
- La barca sin pescador (1964) as Luis
- José María (1963)
- Los farsantes (1963) as Avilés
- La ruta de los narcóticos (1963) as Jacky
- Trampa mortal (1963) as Julián
- Noche de verano (1963) as Pablo
- Las travesuras de Morucha (1962)
- Trigo limpio (1962) as Traidor
- The Rape of the Sabines (1962)
- ¿Dónde pongo este muerto? (1962) as Empleado Hotel
- Tierra de todos (1962) as Soldado
- ¿Pena de muerte? (1961) as José Costa
- Juventud a la intemperie (1961) as Matón
- Los cuervos (1961) as Detective
