= Fortunata y Jacinta =

Spanish novel by Benito Pérez Galdós

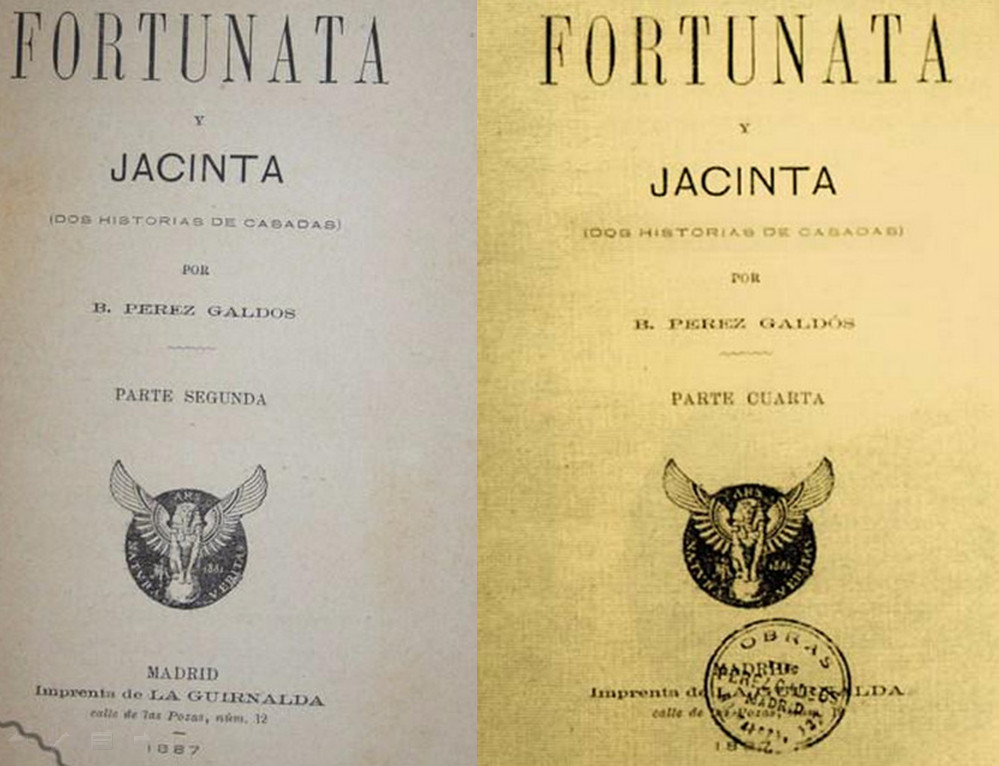
- Title page of the first edition of Fortunata y Jacinta (1887)
- Author: Benito Pérez Galdós
- Language: Spanish
- Genre: Realist Novel
- Publisher: (copyright expired)
- Publication date: 1887
- Publication place: Spain
- Media type: Print

Fortunata y Jacinta (Fortunata and Jacinta), was written by Benito Pérez Galdós in 1887 and published in the same year. It is, together with Leopoldo Alas y Ureña's La Regenta (The Judge's Wife), one of the most popular and representative novels of Spanish literary realism. Born in Las Palmas de Gran Canaria, Canary Islands, the author went to Madrid, the capital, to study law at age 18. There he would create a literary world that was present in almost all his writings. The novel was a sensation upon its release because of its scathing critique of the Spanish middle class, and for its frank sexuality. While criticized by political and religious leaders, it was praised by peers of Galdós for its realistic depiction of life amongst all classes in 19th century Madrid.

== Plot summary ==
The story revolves around Fortunata and Jacinta, two women of different classes who claim Juanito Santa Cruz as their husband. Juanito, the scion of a wealthy family, goes around carousing and womanizing with his friends. In one of these episodes, he is taken with Fortunata, a young woman of the lower class. This encounter ends when Juanito grows bored of Fortunata and disappears from her life leaving her pregnant. Worried about Juanito's lifestyle, his mother decides to marry him to his cousin Jacinta and arranges a series of meetings between them that end in marriage. During their honeymoon, he tells her about his experiences in the poor neighbourhoods of Madrid and talks to her about Fortunata and how sorry he is for mistreating her. Jacinta forgives him, but remains curious about his infidelity.

Time passes and Jacinta fails to get pregnant. She and the rest of the family become obsessed with this.

Ido del Sagrario is a poor man whom Juanito invites to the house with the intention of humiliating him for his own amusement. He shows up at the Santa Cruz home one day and informs Jacinta that he knows of a son that Juanito had with Fortunata. Jacinta becomes very excited about the idea of having her husband's child. After consulting with Guillermina Pacheco (a saintly neighbour), the two women go to one of Madrid's poor neighbourhoods to see the boy, "Pitusín". The baby's guardian is José Izquierdo, uncle of Fortunata, from whom they end up buying the wild boy.

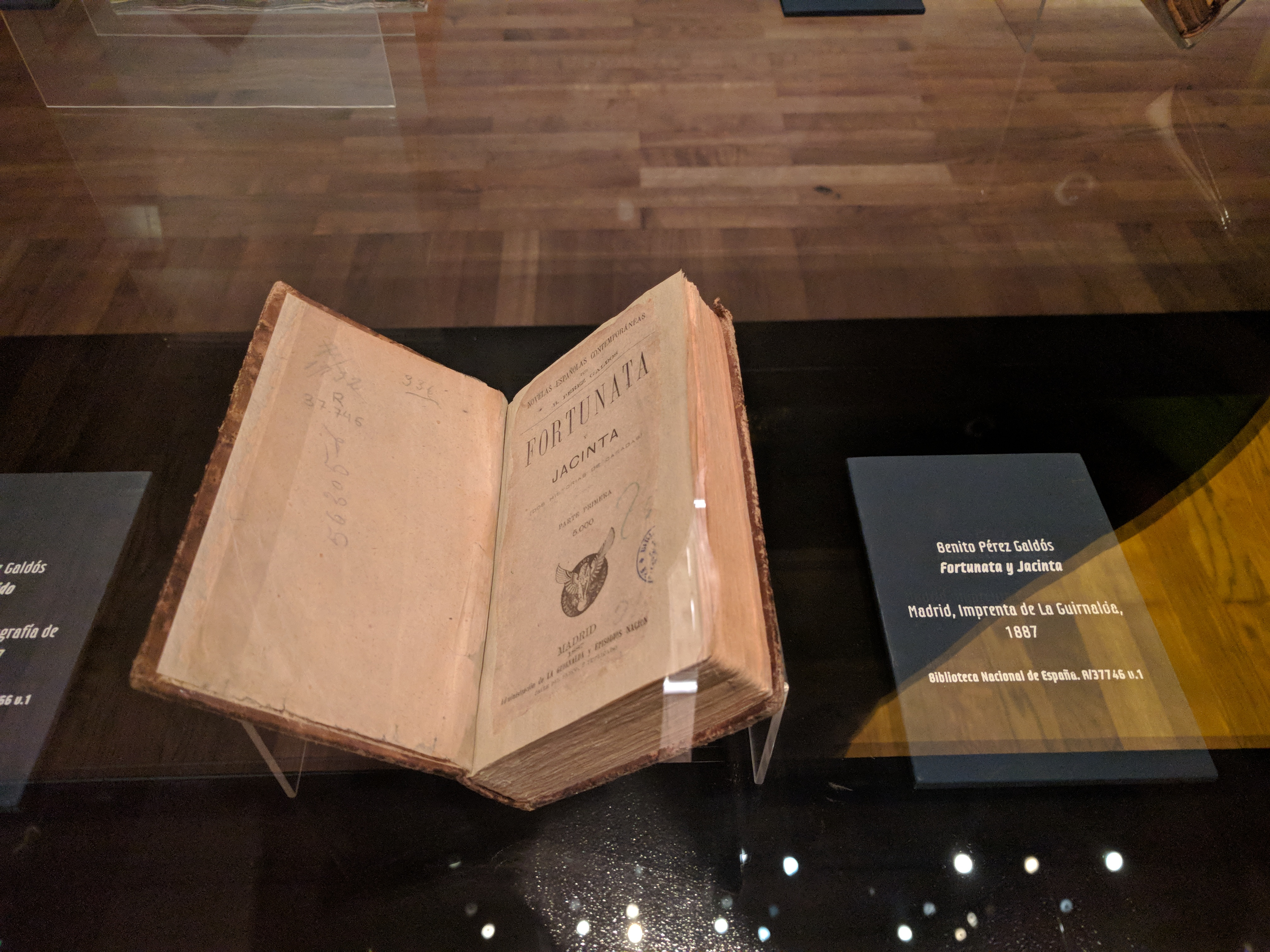
First edition by La Guindalera editors, 1887 (Biblioteca Nacional de España).

When Jacinta talks to her husband about the "adoption", the discussion turns farcical. Juanito tells her that Pitusín cannot be his son, since his baby died years ago. Fortunata herself had asked for his help when the baby got sick but it was too late and they could only watch him die. Pitusín is then José Izquierdo's step-grandson. Jacinta rallies and tries to raise Pitusín, but her despair from the deception and the wild manners of the boy are too much for her and she ends up sending him to an orphanage.

Meanwhile, Fortunata has been living with various men, and living badly. If one man did not deceive her, he beat her, or abandoned her at the first opportunity. She was in Barcelona for a time, and on her return she moved in with Feliciana, an acquaintance of hers. Feliciana's boyfriend usually came to her house to visit with a friend of his, Maximiliano ("Maxi") Rubín. It is there that Rubín falls hopelessly in love with Fortunata. Soon the young man proposes to maintain her, and Fortunata, seeing this as an opportunity to escape her situation, accepts his offer.

Maxi lives with his aunt, Doña Lupe and works in a pharmacy while he studies chemistry. He is also delicate and prone to sicknesses, and Fortunata realises that they will never have children together. As his relationship with Fortunata progresses, he wants to marry her and consults his aunt and brothers. Everyone agrees that Fortunata should spend some time at Las Micaelas, a convent that houses and tries to reform "fallen" women. There Fortunata becomes friends with Mauricia "La Dura", an alcoholic seamstress. She also sees Jacinta, one of the convent's wealthy patronesses, for the first time.

After the prescribed time passes, Fortunata and Maxi marry. However, a trap awaits Fortunata in her new home: Juanito Santa Cruz has bought the apartment next door, and he bribes the newlyweds' servant to sow discord between the couple. It does not take long before Fortunata takes the bait and leaves her husband. Maxi returns to his aunt's house, and Fortunata moves into the apartment paid for by Juanito.

With time, Juanito grows tired of Fortunata again and leaves, this time leaving her a small sum to live on for a while. Fortunata bumps into Don Evaristo Feijoo, friend of her brother-in-law Juan Pablo. Feijoo proposes to become Fortunata's protector and lover and pays for her lodging and upkeep. He also instructs her, and she becomes wiser and more cultured under his influence. This works out until Feijoo begins to think he is too old and fears that once he is dead Fortunata will find herself once again in the gutter. Feijoo advises her to return to her husband's house, and, after Feijoo subtly prepares the ground for her, she does.

Seeing Fortunata reformed and back with her husband makes Juanito Santa Cruz want her once again. Fortunata, without even fleeing from the house, falls for him once more. Fortunata and Jacinta finally meet face to face and confront each other. Jacinta tries to dismiss Fortunata as a nobody but Fortunata declares herself to be the true wife of Juanito, since she met him first and had a child by him. Jacinta is hurt by this and Fortunata decides to have another child with Juanito.

Maxi gradually loses his mind and develops a fatalistic desire to kill himself and Fortunata, as well as other members of the family, to "free" them from what he sees as the "beast", i.e. life and its associated suffering. Meanwhile, Juanito begins to tire of Fortunata yet again. One day, in his state of insanity, Maxi realises that his wife is pregnant. Rather than explain to Doña Lupe what has happened, Fortunata simply gets out of the house and returns to her Aunt Segunda, at the place she was raised. She has her second child there, attended by a doctor who is a friend of the Rubíns and of Segismundo Ballester, a co-worker of Maxi's from the pharmacy who is also in love with her. Jacinta soon learns this and sends an emissary to Fortunata to ask her for her child, in adoption. Fortunata adamantly refuses.

Maxi is told that Fortunata is dead. He refuses to believe this and is able to figure out where she is following Segismundo. He meets her and her baby and, out of spite, tells her that Juanito Santa Cruz was and is still betraying her with Aurora, a family friend of the Rubíns and an intimate friend of Fortunata. As soon as she finds herself alone at home, Fortunata goes to Aurora's shop and has a fight with her. The fight causes Fortunata a haemorrhage. Seeing that she is dying, Fortunata arranges to give the custody of her child to Jacinta.

Jacinta receives the child gladly and also learns the true reason of Fortunata's death and of her husband's many betrayals. She will not forgive him any longer and their marriage will be in name only hereafter. The same day of Fortunata's funeral, they also bury Feijoo. After finally being convinced Fortunata is dead Maxi asks to be sent to a monastery. Maxi is in fact finally sent to the insane asylum at Leganés by his family, who attempt to convince him it is in fact the monastery he wished to enter; despite seeing through their deception he is now too apathetic and fatalistic to object to such treatment and is resigned to his fate.

== Main characters ==
- Fortunata – Young woman of the lower class, she is essentially illiterate and ignorant.
- Juanito Santa Cruz – Pampered only child of a wealthy bourgeois Madrid family
- Jacinta – Wife and cousin of Juanito Santa Cruz. Barren and obsessed with having children.
- Maximiliano "Maxi" Rubín – Sickly youth of the lower middle class who is studying pharmaceuticals; husband of Fortunata

Characters associated with Fortunata

- Juárez "el Negro" – Man with whom Fortunata has a brief relationship after her first affair with Juanito Santa Cruz
- Camps – Another one of Fortunata's lovers between her first and second affair with Santa Cruz
- Evaristo Feijoo – Retired colonel who takes in Fortunata for a time
- José Ido del Sagrario – Mad novelist on hard times and neighbor of Izquierdo
- Nicanora – Wife of Ido del Sagrario
- José Izquierdo – Uncle of Fortunata and brother of Segunda
- Rosita – Housekeeper bribed by Santa Cruz to sabotage the marriage of Fortunata and Maxi
- Mauricia "la Dura" – A friend that Fortunata makes during her time in the Las Micaelas convent. She is an alcoholic with an illegitimate daughter.
- Juan Evaristo Segismundo – Second child of Fortunata
- Segunda Izquierdo – Aunt of Fortunata
- Aurora Samaniego – the widow of a Frenchman, is a close friend of Fortunata until she begins an affair with Juanito Santa Cruz

Characters associated with Maximiliano "Maxi" Rubín

- Olmedo – School friend of Maxi
- Feliciana – Olmedo's lover and acquaintance of Fortunata
- Juan Pablo Rubín – Oldest of the Rubín brothers, initially a carlist
- Refugio – Juan Pablo Rubín's lover
- Doña Lupe – Aunt of Maxi, a usurer and liberal
- Nicolás Rubín – Middle Rubín brother, a priest
- Segismundo Ballester – Manager of the pharmacy where Maxi works; falls in love with Fortunata
- Torquemada – Userer and friend of Doña Lupe
- Papitos – young girl whom Doña Lupe has taken in as her maid

Characters associated with Jacinta

- Manuel Moreno Isla – Nephew of Guillermina Pacheco and family friend of the Santa Cruz, secretly in love with Jacinta
- Isabel Cordero – Mother of Jacinta
- Gumersindo Arnáiz – Father of Jacinta and brother of Barbarita Arnáiz
- Guillermina Pacheco – Old friend of the Santa Cruz. Runs an orphanage and does charitable works in the lower -class neighborhoods.

Characters associated with Juanito Santa Cruz

- Don Baldomero Santa Cruz – Father of Juanito Santa Cruz. Successful retired merchant
- Doña Barbarita Arnáiz – Extremely dotting mother of Juanito Santa Cruz
- Plácido Estupiñá – Elderly friend and employee of the Santa Cruz family
- Jacinto Villalonga – Old University pal of Juanito and often his partner in crime. Involved in politics.

== Adaptations ==
Fortunata y Jacinta has been adapted several times for stage and screen:

- The novel was the basis of the 1970 film of the same name produced by Emiliano Piedra, directed by Angelino Fons and with Emma Penella in the role of Fortunata.
- The book was adapted into a 1980 limited television series of the same name by Televisión Española, directed by Mario Camus, with Ana Belén as Fortunata and Maribel Martín as Jacinta.
- It was also adapted for the stage by Ricardo López Aranda, premiered in 1969 at Teatro Lara, in Madrid, directed by Alberto González Vergel with Nati Mistral as Fortunata and at Teatro Español in 1994, directed by Juan Carlos Pérez de la Fuente.
