= Ricardo Moyán =

Spanish actor

Ricardo Moyán is a Spanish actor

He appeared in La caza del oro (1972), and Dallas (1974), both directed by Joan Bosch; and A Noose Is Waiting for You Trinity (1972), directed by Alfonso Balcázar,

== Filmography ==
- Cuarenta años sin sexo (1979) as Marinero catalán
- El último proceso en París (1974) as Matón
- Dallas (1974) as Bart Bright
- Los Kalatrava contra el imperio del karate (1974) as Matón
- Busco tonta para fin de semana (1973) as Hermano de Elena
- The Killer with a Thousand Eyes (1973)
- A Noose Is Waiting for You Trinity (1972) as Don, Slim Henchman
- Fabulous Trinity (1972) as Mulligan
- They Believed He Was No Saint (1972) as Jed Spotless
- God in Heaven... Arizona on Earth (1972) as Pistolero de Styles
- His Name Was Holy Ghost (1972) as Drunk
- Four Candles for Garringo (1971)
- And the Crows Will Dig Your Grave (1971) as Dawson
- Dig Your Grave Friend... Sabata's Coming (1971) as Morgan
- Stagecoach of the Condemned (1970) as Brett Hudson
- El señorito y las seductoras (1969) as Campesino
- Gentleman Killer (1967) as Ferreras Henchman
- El primer cuartel (1966) as El Chato
- Ruthless Colt of the Gringo (1966) as Fess
