= Julián Mateos =

Spanish actor

- Born: 15 January 1938; Robledillo de Trujillo, Spain
- Died: 27 December 1996 (aged 58); Madrid, Spain
- Occupations: Actor; Film producer
- Years active: 1960–1989
- Spouse: Maribel Martín
- Children: 1

Julián Mateos (15 January 1938 – 27 December 1996) was a Spanish actor and film producer. He appeared in 48 films and television shows between 1960 and 1980. He starred in the film The Robbers, which was entered into the 12th Berlin International Film Festival.

He died on 27 December 1996 from lung cancer at the age of 58.

== Partial filmography ==
- Las estrellas (1961) - Miguel
- Juventud a la intemperie (1961) - Toni
- No dispares contra mí (1961) - Luigi
- The Robbers (1962) - Carmelo Barrachina 'Compadre'
- Los castigadores (1962) - Pepe
- Los desamparados (1962)
- El precio de un asesino (1963) - Miguel Velasco
- Young Sánchez (1964) - Paco / Young Sánchez
- Crimen (1964) - Carlos
- Cyrano and d'Artagnan (1964) - Marquis de Cinq-Mars
- Tiempo de amor (1964) - Servando
- La Celestina P... R... (1965)
- Return of the Seven (1966) - Chico
- 10:30 P.M. Summer (1966) - Rodrigo Palestra
- The Hellbenders (1967) - Ben
- El último sábado (1967) - José Luis Sánchez
- Oscuros sueños de agosto (1968) - Mario
- Los flamencos (1968) - Diego
- ...dai nemici mi guardo io! (1968) - Hondo
- Shalako (1968) - Rojas
- The Wanton of Spain (1969) - Calixto
- Les Étrangers (1969) - Kaine
- Bohemios (1969) - Roberto Randel
- Four Rode Out (1970) - Frenando Nunez
- Ann and Eve (1970) - Hotel Porter
- The Kashmiri Run (1970) - Ramtgen
- Hembra (1970)
- La orilla (1971) - Juan
- Cold Eyes of Fear (1971) - Quill
- Catlow (1971) - Recalde
- La otra imagen (1973)
- El último viaje (1974) - Máximo
- Death's Newlyweds (1975) - Joaquín 'Chimo'
- La endemoniada [AKA Demon Witch Child] (1975) - Father Juan
- Forget the Drums (1975)
- La Carmen (1976)
- Los santos inocentes (1984, producer)
- Voyage to Nowhere (1986, producer)
