= I'll Kill Him and Return Alone =

1967 film

- Film poster
- Spanish: El hombre que mató a Billy el Niño
- Directed by: Julio Buchs
- Written by: Lucio Fulci; Carlo Veo
- Screenplay by: Julio Buchs; Federico De Urrutia
- Story by: Julio Buchs; Federico De Urrutia; José Mallorquí
- Produced by: Silvio Battistini; Ricardo Sanz
- Starring: Peter Lee Lawrence; Fausto Tozzi; Gloria Milland
- Cinematography: Miguel Fernández Mila; Domenico Scala
- Edited by: Cecilia Gómez; Magdalena Pulido
- Music by: Gianni Ferrio
- Production companies: Aitor Films; Kinnesis Film
- Distributed by: Aitor Films; Cinerama Filmgesellschaft MBH; RAF Industries; Alive Vertrieb und Marketing; Something Weird Video; Wild Coyote
- Release date: 9 March 1967 (Italy)
- Running time: 100 minutes
- Countries: Spain; Italy

I'll Kill Him and Return Alone (The Man Who Killed Billy the Kid; A Few Bullets More; Spanish: El hombre que mató a Billy el Niño) is a 1967 Spanish drama-Western film directed by Julio Buchs, written by Lucio Fulci, composed by Gianni Ferrio and starring Peter Lee Lawrence, Fausto Tozzi and Dyanik Zurakowska. It is about Pat Garrett and Billy the Kid.

== Cast ==
- Peter Lee Lawrence as William 'Billy the Kid' Bonney
- Fausto Tozzi as Pat Garrett
- Dianik Zurakowska as Helen Tunstall
- Gloria Milland as Mrs Kathleen Bonney
- Carlos Casaravilla as Jackson Murphy
- Antonio Pica as Mark Travis
- Luis Prendes as John Tunstall
- Enrique Ávila as Hank – Fort Summer Saloonkeeper
- Orlando Baralla as Governor of New Mexico
- Paco Sanz as Peddler
- Luis Rivera as Mark Liston
- Barta Barri as Rancher – Tunstall's Neighbor
- Alfonso Rojas as Paul Powers – Tunstall's Foreman
- Luis Induni as Maurice – Travis's Henchman
- Milo Quesada as Raul Alonso – Rustler Leader
- Miguel Palenzuela as Peter 'Mac' MacGregor
- Antonio Molino Rojo as Tom MacGregor
- Manuel Alexandre as Manuel Albarca – Gravedigger
- Miguel de la Riva as Cavalry Lieutenant
- Tomás Blanco as Peter – Helen's Uncle
- Margot Cottens as Mrs Huerte
- Carmen Porcel as Mrs Patterson
- Alfredo Santa Cruz as General
- Gonzalo Esquiroz as Greg – Travis's Henchman
- José Canalejas as Jake – Travis's Henchman
- Alfonso de la Vega as Hols – Travis's Henchman
- Santiago Rivero as Silver City Saloonkeeper
- Adriano Domínguez
- Erasmo Pascual as Erasco Colmenero
- María Isbert as Cotilla
- Miguel Armario as Ciudadano
- Simón Arriaga as Pablo – Garcia's Henchman / Cattle Rustler
- Luis Barboo as MacGregor's Henchman
- Chiro Bermejo as Bocazas
- Fernando Bilbao as Aguador
- Frank Braña as Murphy's Henchman
- Juan Cazalilla as Barman
- Antonio Cintado as Aguador
- Álvaro de Luna as Aguador
- Tito García as Francisco
- Pilar Gómez Ferrer as Ciudadana
- Rafael Hernández as Ciudadano
- Rufino Inglés as Ciudadano
- José Luis Lizalde as Hotelero
- Ángel Menéndez as Jugador
- Antonio Orengo as Mexican Landowner
- José Orjas as José Gonzalez
- José Riesgo as Comprador de armas
- Vicente Roca as Ciudadano
- Emilio Rodríguez as Store Customer
