= Dead Men Don't Count =

1968 film by Rafael Romero Marchent

- Directed by: Rafael Romero Marchent
- Written by: Marco Leto; Rafael Romero Marchent; Vittorio Salerno
- Cinematography: Aldo Ricci
- Music by: Riz Ortolani
- Release date: 1968
- Language: Spanish

Dead Men Don't Count (Spanish: ¿Quién grita venganza?, Italian: I morti non si contano, also known as Cry for Revenge) is a 1968 Spanish-Italian Spaghetti Western film written and directed by Rafael Romero Marchent.

== Cast ==
- Anthony Steffen as Fred Dannon
- Mark Damon as Johnny Dannon
- María Martín as Witwe Reed/Mrs. Rogers
- Dyanik Zurakowska as Elizabeth
- Luis Induni as Steve Rogers
- Piero Lulli as Sheriff Bob Watson
- Raf Baldassarre as Greg Lassiter
- Barta Barri as Forrest
- Josè Marco as Jack Logan
- Jesús Guzmán as Jonathan Alegría
- Miguel del Castillo as Judge Wright
- Raf Baldasarre as Gregory Lassiter
- Carlos Romero Marchent as Forrest Jr.
- Fabián Conde
- Alfonso de la Vega as Deputy Jim
- Guillermo Méndez as Lassiter Brother
- Dianik Zurakovska as Elisabeth
- Luis Barboo as Anderson
- Giovanni Petti as Harrison, the farmer
