= Mario Pardo (actor) =

Spanish actor (born 1944)

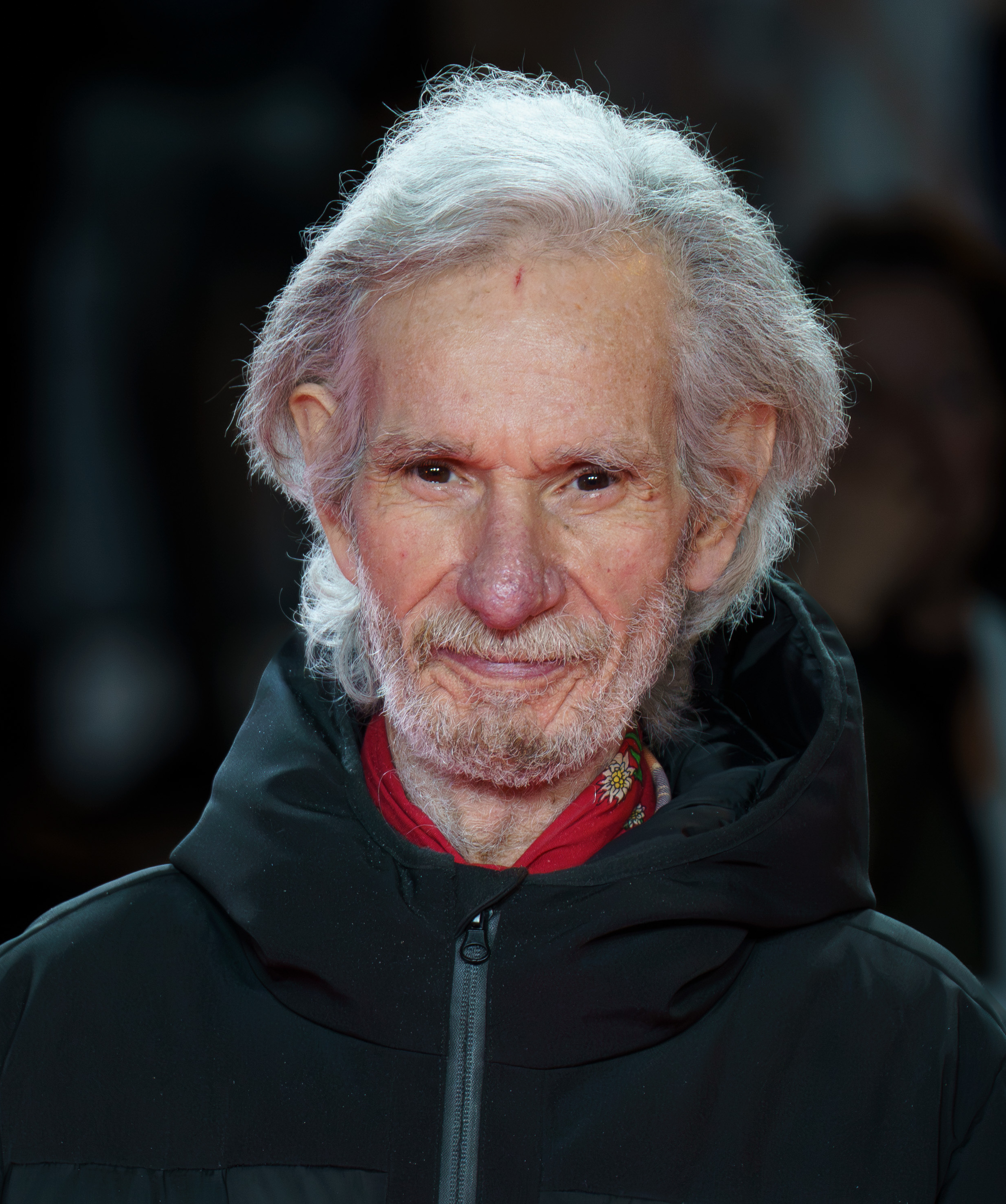
- Pardo in 2025
- Born: 16 April 1944 (age 82); Berga, Spain
- Occupation: Actor

Mario Pardo (born 16 April 1944) is a Spanish actor. He gained notoriety for his work in television miniseries Fortunata y Jacinta.

== Biography ==
Mario Pardo was born in Berga, province of Barcelona, on 16 April 1944. He studied Philosophy and Letters at the University of Salamanca, where he became acquainted with acting, and trained his acting chops at the EOC in Madrid. He later relocated to the Basque Country.

He made his big screen debut in Basilio Martín Patino's Love and Other Solitudes (1969). His 1970s resumee include performances in The Wind's Fierce (1970), La leyenda del alcalde de Zalamea (1973), Clara is the Price (1974), and El Love Feroz (1973).

His role as Maximiliano Rubín in TVE miniseries Fortunata y Jacinta (1980) earned him notoriety. Ensuing roles include his portrayals of Iturbe in Escape from Segovia (1981), Rubio Antofagasta in Mario Camus' The Beehive (1982), and Ramón in Luces de bohemia, the 1985 adaptation of the play of the same name by Ramón del Valle Inclán, written by Camus and directed by Miguel Ángel Díez. He also appeared in El río que nos lleva (1989), Don Juan in Hell (1991, as Don Juan's esquire Esganarel), and Savages (2001, as Turuta).

He portrayed Mohamed "Moromierda" in crime comedy film Makinavaja, el último choriso (1992) and its sequel ¡Semos peligrosos! Uséase, Makinavaja 2 (1993). He portrayed Damián, the tame father of Elena Valdés (María Castro) in television series Tierra de lobos. His work earned him a nomination to Best Television Actor in a Minor Role at the 20th Actors and Actresses Union Awards.

Late television performances include credits in Adolfo Suárez, el presidente (as Gutiérrez Mellado), Cuéntame (as Lorenzo), and ¡García!. Likewise, he has also appeared in films such as The Platform (2019), En otro lugar (2022), and Close Your Eyes (2023), portraying aging film editor Max Roca.
