= Ricardo Sanz =

Ricardo Sanz may refer to:

- Ricardo Sanz (film producer)
- Ricardo Sanz García (1898–1986), Spanish militant and union leader
