= Dig Your Grave Friend... Sabata's Coming =

1971 film

- Film poster
- Spanish: Abre tu fosa, amigo... llega Sábata
- Directed by: Juan Bosch
- Written by: Sauro Scavolini
- Screenplay by: Ignacio F. Iquino; Juliana San José de la Fuente
- Story by: Ignacio F. Iquino; Luciano Martino; Juliana San José de la Fuente
- Produced by: Ignacio F. Iquino
- Starring: Richard Harrison; Fernando Sancho; Raf Baldassarre
- Cinematography: Luciano Trasatti; Floriano Trenker
- Edited by: Antonio Graciani; Luis Puigvert; Michele Massimo Tarantini
- Music by: Henry Soteh
- Production companies: Devon Film; IFI Producción S.A.
- Distributed by: Divisa Home Video; Edel Media & Entertainment; Ignacio Ferrés Iquino; Loving the Classics; Loyal Video
- Release date: 12 July 1971 (Barcelona)
- Running time: 88 min
- Countries: Spain; Italy
- Language: Spanish

Dig Your Grave Friend... Sabata's Coming (Spanish: Abre tu fosa, amigo... llega Sábata) is a 1971 Spanish-Italian western film directed by Juan Bosch and starring by Richard Harrison, Fernando Sancho and Raf Baldassarre. It was scored by Enrique Escobar. The film is an unofficial sequel to Sabata.

== Cast ==
- Richard Harrison as Steve McGowan
- Fernando Sancho as León Pompero
- Raf Baldassarre as Sabata
- Alejandro Ulloa as Miller
- Indio González as Todd
- Luis Induni as Sheriff
- Gustavo Re as George McGowan
- Tania Alvarado as Helen
- Fernando Rubio as Miguel
- Jarque Zurbano as Cochero
- Tomás Torres as Tatum
- Luis Oar as Tendero
- Juan Fernández as Telegrafista
- Carlos Ronda as Viajero
- Joaquín Blanco as Murdy
- Juan Torres as Sastre
- Juan Velilla as Mejicano
- Ricardo Moyán as Morgan
- Irene D'Astrea as Dueña de la posada
- Leontine May as Leontine May
- Brizio Montinaro as Brizio Montinaro
- Manuel Bronchud as Trabajador de McGowan
- Esteban Dalmases as Thomas, ayudante del Sheriff
- Fanny Grey as Chica rubia de la posada
- Isidro Novellas as José
