= Tania Alvarado =

Spanish actress

Tania Alvarado is a Spanish actress. She appeared in the comedy film Death of a Bureaucrat (1966), directed by Tomás Gutiérrez Alea and scored by Leo Brouwer. She appeared in two western films directed by John Wood: Too Much Gold for One Gringo (1972), and Abre tu fosa, amigo... llega Sábata (1971), starring Richard Harrison.

== Filmography ==
- They Believed He Was No Saint (1972) as María
- Dig Your Grave Friend... Sabata's Coming (1971) as Helen
- El corsario (1970)
- Django Defies Sartana (1970) as Maria
- Death of a Bureaucrat (1966)
