= Fabio Diotallevi =

Italian film producer

Fabio Diotallevi is an Italian film producer and production manager.

He produced along Mino Loy and Luciano Martino Tutti i Colori del Buio (1972), directed by Sergio Martino. He also produced Hercules (1983), The Adventures of Hercules II (1985), Hit Squad (1976), and Vacanze per un massacro (1980).

== Filmography ==
- La lettera (2004)
- Ángeles de negro (2002)
- Buck and the Magic Bracelet (1998)
- Una notte che piove (1995)
- Complicity (1995)
- Tutta colpa della SIP (1988)
- The Adventures of Hercules (1985)
- Raza violenta (1984)
- El desafío de Hércules (1983)
- Madness (1980)
- Pensión Paraíso (1979)
- Play Motel (1979)
- Obscene Desire (1978)
- Escuadra anti-robo (1976)
- Last Moments (1974)
- Enter the Devil (1974)
- Prey of Vultures (1972)
- Todos los colores de la oscuridad (1972)
- The Case of the Scorpion's Tail (1971)
- And the Crows Will Dig Your Grave (1971)
- Interrabang (1969)
- Satyricon (1969)
- Wrath of God (1968)

== Bibliography ==
- Kinnard, Roy; Crnkovich, Tony (20 February 2017). Italian Sword and Sandal Films, 1908-1990. McFarland Publishing. p. 256. ISBN 9781476662916.
- Curti, Roberto (24 September 2013). Italian Crime Filmography, 1968-1980. McFarland Publishing. p. 332. ISBN 9780786469765.
