= Vicente Escudero =

Spanish dancer

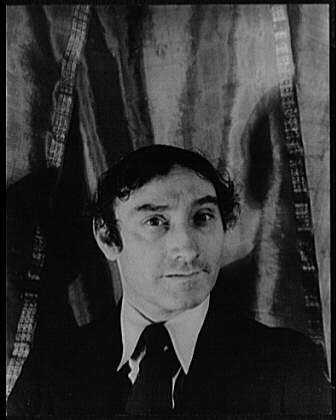
Vicente Escudero (1933)

Vicente Escudero (27 October 1888 in Valladolid, Spain – 4 December 1980 in Barcelona) was a Spanish flamenco dancer. He was closely associated with the avant-garde of his time and brought modernist aesthetics to bear on his theory of dance.

Escudero was one of the few theorists of his time to comment on the choreography and presentation of the male flamenco dance and his 'Decalogue' or ten rules for the male dancer are still respected today. As well as being the leading flamenco dancer of his era, he was a talented painter in the style, and his studies of flamenco are frequently exhibited. His work was admired by the Spanish modernist painter Joan Miró. Escudero also appeared in the films Castille On Fire (1960) and With the East Wind (1966).

His first official performance was in 1920 at the Olympia Theatre in Paris. He reached his maturity as a dancer between 1926 and 1936, during which time he toured extensively in Europe and the Americas. His most famous production was El amor brujo Escudero's style brought a new dignity and respect to the male flamenco dance, which had sometimes (though wrongly) been regarded as exaggerated and lacking in artistry.

Escudero's writing on the subject of flamenco dance and choreography was influential in forming the tastes of his own generation and the next, and he both worked with and influenced the legendary Antonio Gades. His style was based on a strong and expressive masculinity and clear and precise footwork and braceos (arm movements). Escudero's ten principles were as follows:

1. Dance in a masculine style.
2. Sobriety.
3. Turn the wrist with the fingers closed.
4. Limited movement of the hips.
5. Dance in a calm manner, without vanity.
6. Harmony of feet, arms and head.
7. Be beautiful, flexible and honest.
8. Develop an individual style and emphasis.
9. Dance in traditional costume.
10. Keep a range of sounds in the mind, don't put nails in the boots, dance on a simple stage and don't use accessories.

His published writing includes:

- Mi baile (My Dance) (1947);
- Pintura que baila (A Dancing Painter) (1950);
- Decálogo del buen bailarín (Ten Rules for a Male Dancer) (1951).
