= The Wind's Fierce =

1970 film

- Directed by: Mario Camus
- Produced by: Mario Cecchi Gori
- Starring: Terence Hill; Maria Grazia Buccella; Mario Pardo; Fernando Rey
- Cinematography: Roberto Gerardi
- Music by: Augusto Martelli
- Release date: 1970
- Language: Italian

The Wind's Fierce (Spanish: La cólera del viento, Italian: La collera del vento, also known as Revenge of Trinity, Trinity Sees Red and The Wind's Anger) is a 1970 Spanish-Italian western-drama film written and directed by Mario Camus.

== Plot ==
Andalusia, the late nineteenth century. Wealthy landowner Don Antonio hires two assassins, Marcos and Jacobo, to infiltrate a group of peasant revolutionaries and kill the leaders. After falling in love with the rebel Soledad, Marcos has a change of heart and decides to unite with the peasants.

== Cast ==
- Terence Hill as Marcos
- Maria Grazia Buccella as Soledad
- Mario Pardo as Jacobo
- Máximo Valverde as Ramón
- Fernando Rey as Don Antonio
- Ángel Lombarte as José
- William Layton as Don Lucas
- Manuel Alexandre as Agustín
- Manuel de Blas as Rafael

== Reception ==
Although set in Spain, this film is often classified as a spaghetti-western due to themes, scenes and settings deliberately evocative of the western genre.

Terence Hill gives a dramatic performance in his last film before attaining international stardom with They Call Me Trinity. After the success of that movie, The Wind's Fierce was re-released in many countries as a "Trinity" sequel and misleadingly marketed as a comedy.
