= They Believed He Was No Saint =

1972 film

- Film poster
- Spanish: La caza del oro
- Directed by: Juan Bosch
- Written by: Renato Izzo
- Screenplay by: Juan Bosch; Fabio Piccioni
- Story by: Sergio Donati
- Produced by: Alberto Grimaldi
- Starring: Anthony Steffen; Daniel Martín; Tania Alvarado; Manuel Guitián; Fernando Sancho
- Cinematography: Julio Pérez de Rozas
- Edited by: Luis Puigvert
- Music by: Marcello Giombini
- Production companies: Producciones Cinematográficas Cine XX; Produzioni Europee Associate
- Distributed by: Filmax; Produzioni Europee Associate; Peppercorn-Wormser Film Enterprises
- Release dates: 19 August 1972 (Italy); 4 March 1974 (Spain)
- Running time: 98 min

They Believed He Was No Saint (Spanish: La caza del oro) is a 1972 Spanish western film directed by Juan Bosch and starring Anthony Steffen, Daniel Martín and Tania Alvarado. It is scored by Marcello Giombini, and written by Renato Izzo.

== Cast ==
- Anthony Steffen as Trash Benson
- Daniel Martín as Paco
- Tania Alvarado as María
- Manuel Guitián as Jonathan Carver
- Indio González as Preacher
- Ricardo Moyán as Jed Spotless
- Raf Baldassarre as Director de la prisión
- Juan Miguel Solano as Apache Joe
- Antonio Ponciano as Silvertop
- Luis Induni as Travers
- Ángel Lombarte as Melquiades
- Gustavo Re as Padre Javier
- Juan Torres as Aldeano
- Juan Patiño as Hombre de Rojas
- Irene D'Astrea as Molly
- Jarque Zurbano as Sheriff
- Carmen Roger as Chica de Molly
- Fernando Sancho as Fermín Rojas
- Esteban Dalmases as Hombre de Travers
- Juan Antonio Rubio as Pistolero
