= Three Ladies =

- Directed by: Pedro Lazaga
- Written by: José Luis Dibildos; Pedro Lazaga; José María Palacio
- Produced by: José Luis Dibildos; Ricardo Sanz
- Starring: Francisco Rabal; Laura Valenzuela; José Luis López Vázquez
- Cinematography: Manuel Merino
- Edited by: Alfonso Santacana
- Music by: Antón García Abril
- Production company: Ágata Films
- Distributed by: Radio Films
- Release date: 1960
- Running time: 93 minutes
- Country: Spain
- Language: Spanish

Three Ladies (Spanish: Trío de damas) is a 1960 Spanish comedy film directed by Pedro Lazaga and starring Francisco Rabal, Laura Valenzuela and José Luis López Vázquez.

== Cast ==
- Francisco Rabal as Alberto Sáinz Robledo
- Laura Valenzuela as Ana / Lola / Monique
- José Luis López Vázquez as Julio
- Carmen Ignarra
- Maruja Bustos
- Santiago Ríos
- Jesús Puente as Juan
- Ana María Custodio
- Ismael Merlo as Dr. San Román
- Mayrata O'Wisiedo
- Erasmo Pascual as Dr. José Lazapuch
- Ángela Bravo
- José Orjas as Joyero #1
- Amparo Baró as Empleada tienda de moda
- Juan Cazalilla as Opositor a notarías enagenado
- Emilio Rodríguez as Joyero #2
- Fernando Sánchez Polack as Horacio, un basurero

== Bibliography ==
- de España, Rafael. Directory of Spanish and Portuguese film-makers and films. Greenwood Press, 1994.
