= The Vampires Night Orgy =

- Spanish theatrical poster
- Spanish: La orgía nocturna de los vampiros
- Directed by: León Klimovsky
- Screenplay by: Gabriel Moreno Burgos; Antonio Fos
- Produced by: José Frade
- Starring: Dyanik Zurakowska; Jack Taylor
- Cinematography: Antonio L. Ballesteros
- Edited by: Antonio Ramírez de Loaysa
- Production company: José Frade Producciones Cinematográficas S.A.
- Release date: 19 December 1973 (U.S.)
- Running time: 84 minutes
- Country: Spain
- Language: Spanish

The Vampires Night Orgy (Spanish: La orgía nocturna de los vampiros) is a 1973 Spanish supernatural horror film directed by León Klimovsky and starring Jack Taylor, Dyanik Zurakowska, José Guardiola, and Helga Liné. Its plot follows a group of tourists stranded in a mysterious village inhabited by vampires.

== Cast ==
- Jack Taylor as Luis
- Dyanik Zurakowska as Alma
- José Guardiola as Boris the Mayor
- Charo Soriano as Raquel
- Helga Liné as La Señora
- Manuel de Blas as Marcos
- David Aller as César
- Luis Ciges as Godó
- Gaspar 'Indio' González as Ernesto
- Antonio Páramo as Gendarme

== Release ==
The film opened in the United States regionally, screening in Raleigh, North Carolina beginning on 19 December 1973, as a double feature with Count Dracula's Great Love (1973). The same double bill screened in Pittsburgh, Pennsylvania in May 1974. In 1979 it was distributed across the U.S. to drive-in theatres under the new title "Grave Desires", and received some attention when Gene Siskel not only put it as "Dogs of the Week" for the worst-films feature he and Roger Ebert did on their PBS show, but said it was so awful that he left the drive-in before seeing all of it or staying for the 2nd half of the double bill called "Cemetery Girls."

=== Home media ===
Code Red released the film on Blu-ray on 9 December 2015. In 2025, Vinegar Syndrome released the film on Blu-ray as part of a three-film set alongside Curse of the Devil and Demon Witch Child.
