= Alejandro Ulloa =

Spanish actor (1910–2004)

- Born: 22 October 1910; Madrid
- Died: 27 April 2004 (aged 93)
- Occupation: Actor

Alejandro Ulloa (22 October 1910 – 27 April 2004) was a Spanish actor.

He was born in Madrid on 22 October 1910. He owned a theater company and in 1943, while working as a voice actor, he was the director of Metro Goldwin Mayer in Barcelona. His role debut was El Tenorio by José Zorrilla at Teatro Romea.

He lived in Barcelona until the Spanish Civil War, when he moved to America with his company and Paquita Ferrándiz. When he came back to Spain he appeared in the Spaghetti Western Dig Your Grave Friend... Sabata's Coming (1971), by Ignacio F. Iquino. He also appeared in Es peligroso asomarse al exterior.

He died on 27 April 2004 in Hospital de Barcelona after being bedridden for seven months due to a fall.

His son Alejandro Ulloa was a cinematographer.
