= Jack Taylor (actor) =

American actor (1926–2026)

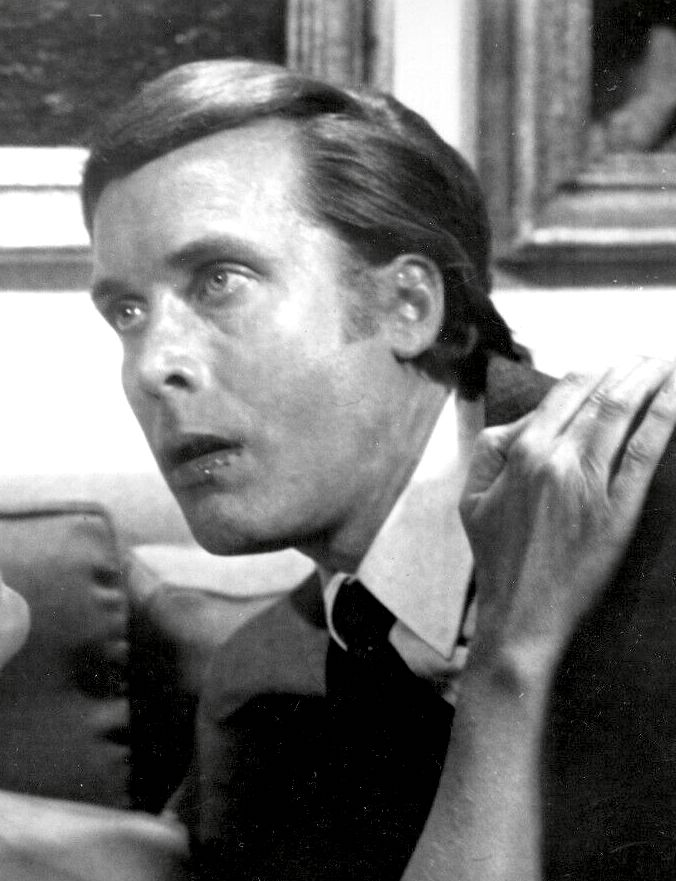
- Taylor in Succubus (1968)
- Born: George Brown Randall; October 21, 1926; Oregon City, Oregon, U.S.
- Died: May 12, 2026 (aged 99)
- Occupation: Actor
- Years active: 1960–2023

George Brown Randall (October 21, 1926 – May 12, 2026), known professionally as Jack Taylor, was an American actor known best for featuring in many European low-budget exploitation films of the 1970s, particularly several directed by Spanish filmmaker Jesús Franco. Born in Oregon City, a suburb of Portland, Oregon, Taylor began acting onstage as a child. During the 1950s, he began appearing in small roles for Los Angeles-based television series before relocating to Mexico and featuring in several films directed by Federico Curiel.

Taylor had several minor roles in film during the early 1960s, including Cleopatra (1963) and Custer of the West (1966) before having a major role in Jesús Franco's Succubus (1968). Taylor relocated subsequently to Spain, and appeared in numerous exploitation and horror films there, including Count Dracula (1970), Eugenie… The Story of Her Journey into Perversion (also 1970), Female Vampire (1973), and Pieces (1982). His later roles include 1492: Conquest of Paradise (1992), Roman Polanski's The Ninth Gate (1999), Daryush Shokof's A2Z (filmed 2004), and Miloš Forman's Goya's Ghosts (2006).

== Early life ==
Taylor was born George Brown Randall on October 21, 1926, in Oregon City, Oregon, a suburb of Portland. He began acting as a child, first appearing in a stage production of Macbeth.

== Career ==
After adopting the stage name Jack Taylor, he began his acting career in small roles on 1950s American television shows such as The Jack Benny Program and Sheena, Queen of the Jungle. He relocated to Mexico during the late 1950s and featured in a number of films for director Federico Curiel, often featuring the Mexican characters Nostradamus the Vampire and the superhero Neutron. Reportedly, he relocated to Europe to appear in the film Cleopatra (1963), but his small part was uncredited.

Taylor had a minor role in the international co-production of Robert Siodmak's Custer of the West (1966).

In 1967, Taylor began his prolific collaboration with Jesús Franco for the film Succubus (1968, his first onscreen lead role) and Eugenie… The Story of Her Journey into Perversion (1970). He went on to play Quincey Morris in the 1970 Franco opus Count Dracula alongside Christopher Lee, Herbert Lom, Soledad Miranda and Klaus Kinski, before appearing in many of Franco's softcore pornography films, most famously Female Vampire (1973) with Lina Romay.

During this period, Taylor also featured with Spanish horror actor Paul Naschy in Dr. Jekyll vs. The Werewolf (1971) and The Mummy's Revenge (1975) and worked for director Amando de Ossorio on three occasions, for The Ghost Galleon (1974), Night of the Sorcerers (1974) and The Sea Serpent (1985). He appeared in León Klimovsky's The Vampires Night Orgy (1972) and the Italian giallo film Red Rings of Fear (1978). Juan Piquer Simón directed him in two films, a Jules Verne adventure film named Where Time Began (1978) and the gory cult film Pieces (1982). Taylor next appeared as a priest in John Milius' Conan the Barbarian (1982).

José Ramón Larraz directed Taylor in two other Spanish slasher films: Rest in Pieces (1987) and Edge of the Axe (1988). He also had a supporting role in Ridley Scott's 1492: Conquest of Paradise (1992), and later featured with Johnny Depp in Roman Polanski's horror film The Ninth Gate (1999).

He next appeared in André Téchiné's Loin (2001), and Miloš Forman's Goya's Ghosts (2006). Taylor had a supporting role in Son of Cain (2013), followed by Grand Piano (also 2013), featuring Elijah Wood and John Cusack.

== Death ==
Taylor died on May 12, 2026, at the age of 99.

== Select filmography ==
Year	Title	Role	Notes	Ref.
1960	Neutron, the Man in the Black Mask			
1960	Neutron vs. The Amazing Dr. Caronte			
1960	Neutron vs. The Death Robots			
1961	The Curse of Nostradamus			
1962	Nostradamus, the Genie of Darkness			
1962	Nostradamus, the Monster Demolisher			
1963	Cleopatra	Caesar's Slave		
1964	Tomb of the Pistolero	Herbert Brandon		
1965	Fall of the Mohicans	Duncan Edward		
1966	Custer of the West			
1967	Agente Sigma 3 - Missione Goldwather	Charles Butler, Agent Sigma 3	Alternate title: Sigma 3	
1968	Succubus	William Francis Mulligan	Alternate title: Necronomicon - Geträumte Sünden	
1969	Nightmares Come at Night	Cynthia's Lover		
1970	Count Dracula	Quincey Morris		
1970	Eugenie… The Story of Her Journey into Perversion	Mirvel		
1971	Dr. Jekyll vs. The Werewolf	Henry Jekyll		
1972	The Vampires Night Orgy	Luis		
1972	The Vengeance of Dr. Mabuse	Dr. Mabuse aka Professor Farkas		
1973	The Killer is One of Thirteen	Harlan		
1973	Autopsy	Dr. Azcona		
1973	Tender and Perverse Emanuelle	Michel Dreville		
1973	Female Vampire	Baron Von Rathony		
1974	The Ghost Galleon	Howard Tucker	Alternative title: Horror of the Zombies	
1974	Night of the Sorcerers	Prof. Jonathan Grant		
1975	The Mummy's Revenge	Prof. Nathan Stern		
1975	Devil's Exorcist	Dr. Beneau / Michele		
1977	Sexy Sisters	Dr. Charles		
1977	Voodoo Passion	Jack Haus		
1977	Where Time Began	Olsen		
1978	Red Rings of Fear	Parravicino		
1978	Nathalie: Escape from Hell	Lt. Erik Muller		
1980	Vicious and Nude	Juan		
1982	Pieces	Professor Arthur Brown		
1982	Conan the Barbarian	Priest		
1984	The Panther Squad	Frank Bramble		
1985	Angel of Death	Aaron Horner		
1985	The Sea Serpent	Asesino	Alternative title: Hydra	
1987	Rest in Pieces	David Hume		
1988	Edge of the Axe	Christopher Caplin		
1988	Iguana	Captain 'Old Lady II'		
1989	Fine Gold	Banquero 2		
1992	1492: Conquest of Paradise	De Vicuña		
1999	Presence of Mind	Father		
1999	The Ninth Gate	Victor Fargas		
2001	Loin	James		
2004	The Birthday	Ron Fulton		
2004	A2Z			
2010	Agnosía	Meissner		
2013	Son of Cain	Andrew Holsteter		
2013	Grand Piano	Patrick Godureaux		
2013	Presentimientos (Inside Love)	Abel		
2014	Wax	Dr. Knox		

== Sources ==
- Caputo, Davide (2012). Polanski and Perception: The Psychology of Seeing and the Cinema of Roman Polanski. Bristol, England: Intellect Ltd. ISBN 978-1-841-50552-7.
- Muir, John Kenneth (2010). Horror Films of the 1980s. Jefferson, North Carolina: McFarland. ISBN 978-0-786-45501-0.
- Weismann, Brad (2021). Lost in the Dark: A World History of Horror Film. Jackson, Mississippi: Univ. Press of Mississippi. ISBN 978-1-496-83325-9.
- Young, R. G. (2000). The Encyclopedia of Fantastic Film: Ali Baba to Zombies. New York City, New York: Applause Books. ISBN 978-1-557-83269-6.
