= Anthony Steffen =

Italian-Brazilian actor, screenwriter and film producer (1930–2004)

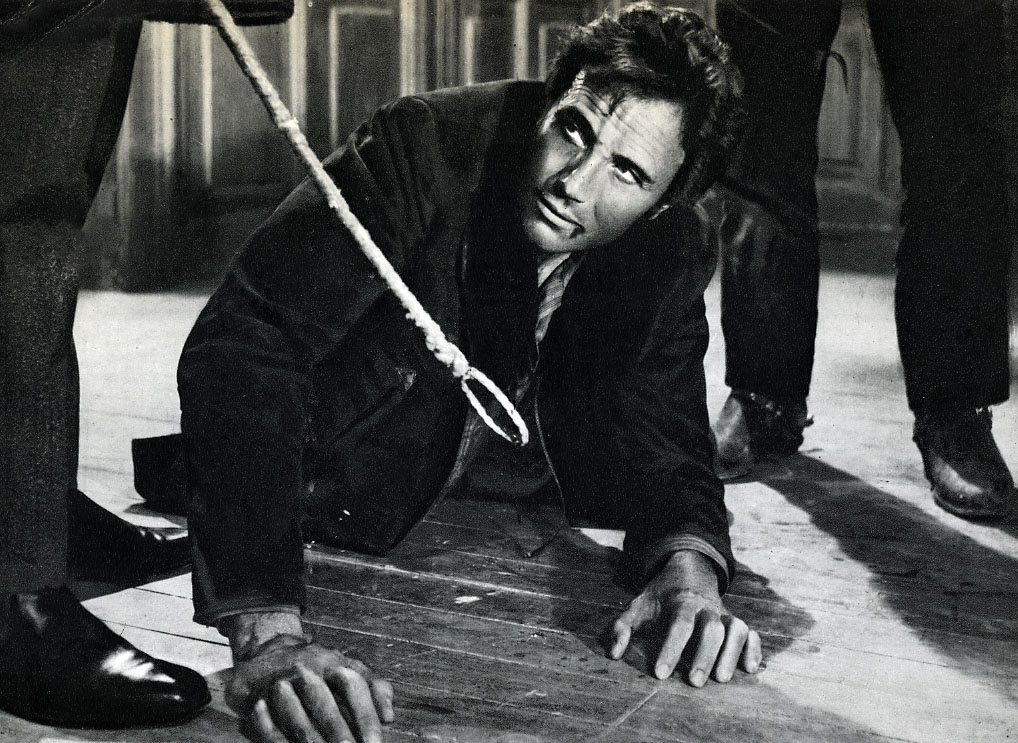
- Steffen in Gunman Sent by God (1968)
- Born: Antônio Luiz de Teffé von Hoonholtz; July 21, 1930; Rome, Italy
- Died: June 4, 2004 (aged 73); Rio de Janeiro, Brazil
- Occupations: Actor, screenwriter, film producer
- Years active: 1953–1991
- Height: 1.90 m (6 ft 3 in)

Anthony Steffen, born Antônio Luiz de Teffé von Hoonholtz (July 21, 1930 – June 4, 2004), was an Italian-Brazilian actor, screenwriter and film producer. Steffen achieved fame as a leading man in Spaghetti Western features. He was also known as Antonio Luigi de Teffe.

== Biography ==
Born Antônio Luiz de Teffé von Hoonholtz at the Brazilian embassy in Rome, in the Pamphilj Palace, his family had noble blood of a long lineage of Counts (von Hoonholtz) originally from Prussia; his great-grandfather was Admiral Antônio Luiz von Hoonholtz, Baron of Teffé. Steffen was the first born among Manuel de Teffé's children (followed by Mário Frederico de Teffé and Melissa Bianca de Teffé), who was a race car driver and later a Brazilian ambassador. Steffen's great-aunt was Nair de Teffé, the first female caricaturist of Brazil, wife of Brazilian President Hermes da Fonseca. He was also a great-grandson of the Count of Costa Pereira. Additionally, he was a nephew to Marchioness Maria Luiza de Teffé Berlingieri and a great-grandnephew to Jorge João Dodsworth, 2nd Baron of Javary. His grandfather, Ambassador Oscar de Teffé von Hoonholtz, was a first cousin to Maria Leocádia Dodsworth de Frontin, Countess of Frontin, the wife of Count Paulo de Frontin.

While still a teenager Steffen, then known as Antonio, fought in World War II among the Italian partisans against the Nazis.

Later, and under the name Antonio de Teffé, he worked behind the scenes in several Italian productions in the early 1950s and later acted in several movies, but never really achieving stardom. In 1962, he had a bit part in Sodom and Gomorrah. An early appearance of his was in the 1955 Gli Sbandati.

From 1965 to 1975, the newly named Anthony Steffen achieved considerable fame in Europe, amassing cult status, starring in 27 Spaghetti Westerns. Considered to be an "Italian Clint Eastwood", he was sometimes criticized for being a stiff or wooden actor. Several of his movies were sizeable box office hits in Europe.

Django the Bastard (aka Stranger's Gundown, 1969) a movie that was produced and written by Steffen, is considered to be an inspiration for Clint Eastwood's High Plains Drifter. In several of his movies, Steffen starred alongside other actors known for Spaghetti Westerns, including Gianni Garko, Peter Lee Lawrence, and William Berger. Outside of the Spaghetti western genre, Steffen also appeared in several Giallo movies including The Night Evelyn Came Out of the Grave (1971). His roles and status diminished as the Spaghetti Western genre fell into decline. Amassing a considerable fortune from his career as an actor, Steffen embarked on a jet set lifestyle.

In his career Steffen performed alongside Sophia Loren, Gina Lollobrigida, Claudia Cardinale, Elke Sommer, Giuliano Gemma, Franco Nero, Gian Maria Volonté, Esmeralda Barros and many other stars of the American and Italian cinema.

Always considered a huge star in Brazil because of the Spaghetti Western popularity in the South American country, Steffen returned to Rio de Janeiro, Brazil in the decade of 1980, until dying of cancer in 2004. He has maintained cult-status among fans of Italian Cinema for being perhaps the most prolific Spaghetti Western Leading actor.

== Selected filmography ==
- Ci troviamo in galleria (1953)
- The Abandoned (1955) - Carlo
- Eighteen Year Olds (1955) - Professore Andrea La Rovere
- Beatrice Cenci (1956) - Giacomo Cenci
- La trovatella di Pompei (1957) - Giorgio della Torre
- Città di notte (1958) - Alberto
- Slave Women of Corinth (1958) - Demetrio
- Devil's Cavaliers (1959) - Richmond
- Ragazzi del Juke-Box (1959) - Paolo Macelloni
- Il carro armato dell'8 settembre (1960)
- Cavalcata selvaggia (1960)
- Solitudine (1961)
- Ultimatum alla vita (1962) - Lt. Krüger
- Sodom and Gomorrah (1962) - The Captain
- Avventura al motel (1963) - Maurizio
- Revenge of the Black Knight (1963) - Dottore George Welby
- The Invincible Brothers Maciste (1964) - Prince Akim
- The Last Tomahawk (1965) - Falkenauge
- I figli del leopardo (1965) - Tenente Garibaldino
- Latin Lovers (1965) - (uncredited)
- Perché uccidi ancora (1965) - Steve McDougall
- A Coffin for the Sheriff (1965) - Sheriff Joe Logan / Shenandoah
- Seven Dollars on the Red (1966) - Johnny Ashley
- An Angel for Satan (1966) - Roberto Merigi
- Ringo, the Mark of Vengeance (1966) - Ringo
- A Few Dollars for Django (1966) - Django / Regan
- Blood at Sundown (1966) - Johnny Liston
- Gentleman Killer (1967) - Gentleman Jo Reeves / Shamango
- Killer Kid (1967) - Captain Morrison / Chamaco
- Train for Durango (1968) - Gringo
- Gunman Sent by God (1968) - Roy Kerry
- A Stranger in Paso Bravo (1968) - Gary Hamilton
- Man Who Cried for Revenge (1968) - Davy Flanagan
- Dead Men Don't Count (1968) - Fred Danton
- A Noose for Django (1969) - Johnny Brandon
- Garringo (1969) - Lt. Garringo
- Django the Bastard (1969) - Django
- Shango (1970) - Shango
- Arizona Colt Returns (1970) - Arizona Colt
- Sabata the Killer (1970) - Sabata / Garringo
- Apocalypse Joe (1970) - Joe Clifford
- The Night Evelyn Came Out of the Grave (1971) - Lord Cunningham
- Viva! Django (1971) - Django
- Crimes of the Black Cat (1972) - Peter Oliver
- They Believed He Was No Saint (1972) - Trash Benson
- Al tropico del cancro (1972) - Doctor Williams
- The Killer with a Thousand Eyes (1973) - Inspector Michael Lawrence
- Fuzzy the Hero (1973) - Shoshena
- Sixteen (1973) - Sergio / Mara's lover
- Lady Dynamite (1973) - Nico Barresi
- Ten Killers Came from Afar (1974) - Dallas
- Charlotte (1974) - Le Prince Sforza
- Siete chacales (1974)
- The Killers Are Our Guests (1974) - Dr. Guido Malerva
- Evil Eye (1975) - Inspector Ranieri
- La encadenada (1975) - Richard
- Rome: The Other Side of Violence (1976) - Dr. Alessi
- Zoo zéro (1979) - Evariste, le commissaire
- Killer Fish (1979) - Max
- Play Motel (1979) - De Sanctis
- Escape from Hell (1980) - Doctor Farrell
- Orinoco: Prigioniere del sesso (1980) - Juan Laredo
- Mulheres Liberadas (1982)
- Momentos de Prazer e Agonia (1983) - Rodolfo
- Abatjour 2 (1990)
- Malù e l'amante (1991) - Frans / Il Conte / husband (final film role)
