= Barta Barri =

Hungarian actor (1911–2003)

- Born: 16 August 1911; Budapest, Austro-Hungarian Empire
- Died: December 7, 2003 (aged 92); Madrid, Spain
- Other name: Bernabé Barta Barry
- Occupation: Actor
- Years active: 1959–1986 (film)

Barta Barri (16 August 1911 – 7 December 2003) was a Hungarian-born Spanish film actor.

== Selected filmography ==
- The Vila Family (1950)
- Criminal Brigade (1950) - Mario
- Verónica (1950)
- Spanish Serenade (1952) - Jefe de los saboteadores
- Dulce nombre (1952)
- Almas en peligro (1952)
- Persecution in Madrid (1952) - Pacheco
- The Dance of the Heart (1953) - Don Pablo
- Bronce y luna (1953)
- La montaña sin ley (1953)
- Fantasía española (1953) - Toscanelli
- El presidio (1954) - Pedro Ramírez
- The Louts (1954)
- Sor Angélica (1954)
- One Bullet Is Enough (1954) - Patorni
- El ceniciento (1955) - Clara's father
- Los agentes del quinto grupo (1955) - Barrier
- El indiano (1955)
- El golfo que vio una estrella (1955)
- El puente del diablo (1956) - Inspector
- Ha pasado un hombre (1956) - Valdés
- La pecadora (1956) - Francisco, el alcalde
- Sitiados en la ciudad (1957)
- Whom God Forgives (1957) - Capataz
- The Pride and the Passion (1957) - (uncredited)
- El aventurero (1957) - Emil
- ...Y eligió el infierno (1957)
- La guerra empieza en Cuba (1957) - Coronel
- Sail Into Danger (1957) - Emil
- The Sun Comes Out Every Day (1958) - Pelotti
- Muchachas en vacaciones (1958)
- El puente de la paz (1958)
- Red Cross Girls (1958) - Padre de Marion
- Die Sklavenkarawane (1958) - Scheich el Dschemal
- Las de Caín (1959)
- Una Gran señora (1959) - Duque de Rípoli
- Der Löwe von Babylon (1959) - Pädar (uncredited)
- Listen To My Song (1959) - Trompetti
- Ama Rosa (1960) - Traficante
- The Boy Who Stole a Million (1960) - Gang Leader
- Peaches in Syrup (1960)
- Conqueror of Maracaibo (1961) - Wilson
- The Invincible Gladiator (1961) - Gladiator
- Darling (1961) - Revolutionary Leader
- The Happy Thieves (1961) - Chern - Lawyer / Fence (uncredited)
- Frei Escova (1961)
- Mi adorable esclava (1962) - Comprador de la lámpara
- The Son of Captain Blood (1962) - Kirby
- Gladiators 7 (1962) - Flaccus
- Siempre en mi recuerdo (1962)
- Gunfight at Red Sands (1963) - Lou Stedman
- The Secret Seven (1963) - Baxo
- The Ceremony (1963) - Death house guard
- José María (1963)
- Cyrano and d'Artagnan (1964) - Tréville (uncredited)
- Tintin and the Blue Oranges (1964) - L'émir (uncredited)
- Saul and David (1964)
- La carga de la policía montada (1964) - Trapper Don Halsey
- Son of a Gunfighter (1965) - Esteban - Don Pedro's Major Domo
- That Man in Istanbul (1965) - Captain
- Espionage in Tangier (1965) - French chauffeur
- The Great Leaders (1965) - Fara
- La dama del alba (1966) - Carretero
- Lightning Bolt (1966) - Senator Woolner
- The Drums of Tabu (1966) - Barta
- Black Box Affair (1966)
- The Big Gundown (1966) - Nathan Plummer - Old Outlaw (uncredited)
- Savage Pampas (1966) - Priest (uncredited)
- Joe l'implacabile (1967) - Cigno
- I'll Kill Him and Return Alone (1967) - Rancher - Tunstill's Neighbor
- Left Handed Johnny West (1967) - Sheriff
- Las cicatrices (1967) - Mayoral
- Custer of the West (1967) - Grand Duke Alexi
- ¡Cómo sois las mujeres! (1968)
- La esclava del paraíso (1968) - Ahmed
- Dead Men Don't Count (1968) - Forrest
- White Comanche (1968) - Mayor Bolker
- O.K. Yevtushenko (1968) - Col. Yevtushenko
- Prisionero en la ciudad (1969) - Chantajista
- Kiss Me Monster (1969) - Inspektor Kramer
- Bridge over the Elbe (1969)
- Garringo (1969)
- Simón Bolívar (1969)
- Cry Chicago (1969) - Matón, O'Connor's henchman
- A Candidate for a Killing (1969) - Hombre de los gémelos
- El niño y el potro (Más allá de río Miño) (1969) - Maracoli
- Los hombres las prefieren viudas (1970) - (uncredited)
- Mr. Superinvisible (1970)
- A Man Called Sledge (1970)
- Cannon for Cordoba (1970) - (uncredited)
- Growing Leg, Diminishing Skirt (1970)
- El vértigo del crimen (1970) - Mr. Fred
- El vampiro de la autopista (1971) - Comisario
- Goya, a Story of Solitude (1971)
- La Noche de Walpurgis (1971) - Muller
- Un aller simple (1971) - Berck
- El Hombre que Vino del Odio (1971) - Vittorio
- Si estás muerto, ¿por qué bailas? (1971) - Divilow
- Red Sun (1971) - Paco
- Nicholas and Alexandra - (uncredited)
- Bad Man's River (1971)
- Dr. Jekyll y el Hombre Lobo (1972) - Gyogyo, the inn-keeper
- Horror Express (1972) - First Telegraphist
- Treasure Island (1972) - Redruth
- Pancho Villa (1972) - Alfonso
- Experiencia prematrimonial (1972) - Jorge
- Huyendo del halcón (1973)
- The Man Called Noon (1973) - Mexican
- ..e così divennero i 3 supermen del West (1973) - Saloon Owner (uncredited)
- Pugni, pirati e karatè (1973) - Pirate (uncredited)
- Tarot (1973) - Pastor
- Las violentas (1974) - Howard
- El talón de Aquiles (1974)
- El pez de los ojos de oro (1974) - Comisario
- El kárate, el Colt y el impostor (1974) - Sheriff (uncredited)
- Night of the Walking Dead (1975) - Mijai
- Ligeramente viudas (1976)
- Un día con Sergio (1976) - Maitre
- The People Who Own the Dark (1976) - Russian ambassador
- The Second Power (1976) - Doctor Daza
- La menor (1976)
- Where Time Began (1977) - Professor
- Curse of the Black Cat (1977) - Cronometrador
- The Black Pearl (1977) - Luis
- Fantasma en el Oeste (1978)
- From Hell to Victory (1979) - (uncredited)
- El lobo negro (1981)
- Revenge of the Black Wolf (1981) - Geronimo
- Monster Dog (1984) - Old Man
- The Sea Serpent (1985) - Defensor
- Las tribulaciones de un Buda Bizco (1986) - (final film role)

== Bibliography ==
- Pitts, Michael R. Western Movies: A Guide to 5,105 Feature Films. McFarland, 2012.
