= The Great House (film) =

1975 film

- Directed by: Francisco Rodríguez Fernández
- Written by: Francisco Rodríguez Fernández; José Miguel Hernán
- Produced by: Miguel Ángel González; Julio Sempere
- Starring: Manuel Ayuso
- Cinematography: Francisco Sempere
- Edited by: Eduardo Biurrun
- Release date: 1975
- Running time: 105 minutes
- Country: Spain
- Language: Spanish

The Great House (Spanish: La casa grande) is a 1975 Spanish drama film directed by Francisco Rodríguez Fernández. It was entered into the 25th Berlin International Film Festival.

== Cast ==
- Manuel Ayuso
- Antonio Cuenca
- Juan Diego
- Antonio Ferrandis
- Antonio Gamero
- Adolfo López
- Maribel Martín
- Francisco Merino
- Enrique Navarro
- Luis Rico
- María Sánchez Aroca
- Fernando Sánchez Polack
- Adolfo Thous
- Julia Trujillo
