= My Horse, My Gun, Your Widow =

1972 film

- Spanish: Tu fosa será la exacta... amigo
- Directed by: John Wood
- Screenplay by: Juan Bosch; Sauro Scavolini
- Story by: Juan Bosch
- Produced by: Luciano Martino; Ricardo Sanz
- Starring: Craig Hill; Chris Huerta; Claudie Lange; Pedro Mª Sánchez; Richard Melvill; Carlo Gaddi
- Cinematography: Giorgio Tonti
- Edited by: Angela Grau
- Music by: Bruno Nicolai
- Production companies: Astro C.C.; Lea Film
- Distributed by: Adria Filmverleih
- Release date: 11 August 1972
- Running time: 90 min
- Country: Spain

My Horse, My Gun, Your Widow (Spanish: Tu fosa será la exacta... amigo) is a 1972 Spanish Eastmancolor western film directed by Juan Bosch (who used the pseudonym John Wood), scored by Bruno Nicolai, written by Sauro Scavolini, and starring Craig Hill. It was shot between July and August 1972.

== Cast ==
- Craig Hill as Doctor Janus Saxon
- Claudie Lange as Deborah Page
- Pedro Mari Sánchez as Louis Donovan
- Chris Huerta as Carrasco
- Richard Melvill as Dog
- Carlo Gaddi as Deputy Gus
- Manuel Bronchud as John
- Florencio Calpe as Pool Player
- Esteban Dalmases as Deputy
- Gaspar 'Indio' González as Miguel
- Luis Induni as Sheriff Appleton
- Francisco Jarque as Barber
- Marcello Meconizzi as Hotel Servant
- Carlos Otero as Safecracker Donovan
- Mimmo Poli as Innkeeper
- Juan Miguel Solano as Confederate Army Lieutenant
- Juan Torres as Mexican illegal
