= Ten Killers Came from Afar =

1975 film by Juan Bosch

- Italian: Il mio nome è Scopone e faccio sempre cappotto
- Directed by: Juan Bosch
- Screenplay by: Juan Bosch; Renato Izzo
- Story by: Juan Bosch; Renato Izzo
- Produced by: Alberto Grimaldi
- Starring: Anthony Steffen; Fernando Sancho; Gillian Hills
- Cinematography: Giancarlo Ferrando; Julio Pérez de Rozas
- Edited by: Eugenio Alabiso
- Music by: Marcello Giombini
- Production companies: Produzioni Europee Associate; Producciones Cinematográficas Cine XX
- Distributed by: All Video; Filmax International
- Release date: 5 June 1975 (Italy)
- Running time: 85 min
- Countries: Spain; Italy

Ten Killers Came from Afar (Italian: Il mio nome è Scopone e faccio sempre cappotto) is a 1975 Italian-Spanish western film directed by Juan Bosch, and written by Renato Izzo. Starring Anthony Steffen, Robert Hundar, and Furio Meniconi.

== Cast ==
- Anthony Steffen as Dallas
- Fernando Sancho as Aguadulce
- Gillian Hills as Glenda Kelly
- Ricardo Palacios as Rompemanos
- Sergio Dore as Brownville Sheriff
- Attilio Severini as Curt
- Gaspar González as Logan
- Ricardo Moyán as Bart Bright
- Juan M. Solano as Bright Brother
- Juan Torres as Maldonado Leader
- Robert Hundar as Doug Bright
- Karin Heske
- Ralph Birks
- Antonio Mayans
- César Ojinaga as Reverendo
- Fernando Palacios as Buster
- Ángel Aranda
- Frank Braña
- Moises Rocha as Luchador
- Manuel Bronchud as Fight Bettor
- Esteban Dalmases as Brownville Deputy
- Juan Fairen as Fight Promoter
- Mir Ferry as Maldonado Brother
- Furio Meniconi
- José Palomo as Fight Spectator
- Juan Patiño as Young Deputy
