= With the East Wind =

1966 film

- Directed by: Mario Camus
- Written by: Ignacio Aldecoa; Mario Camus
- Produced by: Francisco Molero; José Antonio Sáinz de Vicuña
- Starring: Antonio Gades
- Cinematography: Juan Julio Baena
- Edited by: Pablo González del Amo
- Release date: May 1966
- Running time: 87 minutes
- Country: Spain
- Language: Spanish

With the East Wind (Spanish: Con el viento solano) is a 1966 Spanish drama film directed by Mario Camus. It was entered into the 1966 Cannes Film Festival.

== Cast ==
- Antonio Gades as Sebastián
- Vicente Escudero as Montoya
- María José Alfonso as Lupe
- Manuel Arbó as El Pesqui
- Francisco Arenzana as Sargento
- Imperio Argentina as La madre
- Mari Paz Ballesteros as Sebastian's Sister
- Chiro Bermejo as El barbero
- José Caride as Larios
- Antonio Ferrandis as tío Manuel
- Rufino Inglés as El alcalde
- Juan Lizárraga as Un cliente de la taberna
- Ángel Lombarte as Maño, el tabernero
- Luis Marín as Manolo, el barman
- José Manuel Martín as Zafra
- Felipe Martín Puertas as Un cliente de la taberna
- Miguel Palenzuela as Marquise
- Erasmo Pascual as Cabeda
- María Luisa Ponte as Carola
- Fernando Sánchez Polack as Francisco Vázquez
- José Sepúlveda as Don Baldomero
- Lluís Torner as El Lango
