= The Holy Innocents (film) =

- Film poster
- Spanish: Los santos inocentes
- Directed by: Mario Camus
- Written by: Antonio Larreta; Manuel Matji; Mario Camus
- Produced by: Julián Mateos
- Starring: Alfredo Landa; Francisco Rabal; Agustín González; Terele Pávez; Juan Diego; Ágata Lys; Mary Carrillo; Maribel Martín
- Cinematography: Hans Burman
- Music by: Antón García Abril
- Release date: 4 April 1984
- Running time: 105 minutes
- Country: Spain
- Language: Spanish
- Box office: 523,904,385 ₧

The Holy Innocents (Spanish: Los santos inocentes) is a 1984 Spanish drama film directed by Mario Camus based on Miguel Delibes' novel of the same title which stars Alfredo Landa and Francisco Rabal. The plot explores the lives of landless labourers scraping by in an aristocratic estate in 1960s Extremadura.

The film earned wide critical acclaim both in the domestic and the international front, also becoming the highest-grossing Spanish film in Spain at the time.

In the 1984 edition of the Cannes Film Festival, the film was nominated for the Palme d'Or and won the Prize of the Ecumenical Jury Special Mention. Rabal and Landa shared the Best Actor Award at the same festival. It was voted the third best Spanish film by professionals and critics in 1996 Spanish cinema centenary.

== Plot ==
Paco and Régula live on a rural estate owned by an absent marchioness. Among them live their three children: Nieves works as a maid in the big house; Quirce is doing his military service; and their youngest daughter Charito is severely handicapped and confined to a crib. The family is joined by Régula's mentally handicapped brother Azarías, sacked from another estate, who loves birds.

Daily life in the cortijo is shown in painstaking detail and displays an oppressive routine based on a rigid hierarchy. At the top of this stratified system lie the aristocrats owning this and other cortijos, as well as the Francoist politicians and Church officials routinely visiting them. Rural middle classes are represented by the manager Pedro and his bored wife Pura. The house servants and modern-day serfs tending the land occupy the bottom level and are treated as subhuman beings by everyone else.

In this toxic class system, members of every echelon feel entitled to humiliate those deemed their social inferiors. For instance, the owner's son, señorito Iván, often comes back to the estate to openly conduct an affair with Pura, and her knowing husband takes out his impotent rage on the labourers, particularly Azarías.

In one particular instance, a French diplomat visiting the estate questions the level of cultural and social development under Francoism; this offends Iván, who exhibits his mixture of narcissism and cruelty by summoning Paco and Régula and demanding that they write their names on a piece of paper (which they painfully struggle to do, resulting in crude scribbles) in order to make a paternalistic point that illiteracy has been eradicated in Spain. Paco and Régula accept these and many other repeated humiliations of their position as dependents at the whim of the owners and the estate manager, but Nieves and Quirce are less inured to this reality and aim for a better life.

Besides his affair with Pedro's wife, another reason for Iván's visits is his fanatical love of fowling, and hunting parties are routinely organized in the area. Paco, whom he forces up a tree to decoy pigeons, falls and breaks a leg. Quirce briefly replaces Paco but his aloof demeanor vexes Iván, who is more accustomed to the servility of the young man's parents. When it becomes clear that Paco's leg will not heal in time for the next hunting party, Iván tries using Azarías and, in a fit of pique during an unsuccessful hunt, shoots the man's pet jackdaw. Next time Azarías is sent up a tree to work decoys, he drops a noose round Ivan's neck and hangs him in retribution. His infantile mental age spares him legal prosecution (which in 1960s Spain would have entailed a lengthy prison sentence or even the death penalty) and he is committed to an asylum.

== Cast ==
- Alfredo Landa as Paco el Bajo
- Terele Pávez as Régula, his wife
- Belén Ballesteros as Nieves, their elder daughter
- Juan Sánchez as Quirce, their son
- Susana Sánchez as La Niña Chica, their younger handicapped daughter
- Francisco Rabal as Azarías, Régula's handicapped brother
- Agustín González as Don Pedro, the estate manager
- Ágata Lys as Doña Pura, his wife
- Mary Carrillo as Señora Marquesa, the estate owner
- Juan Diego as Señorito Iván, her son
- Maribel Martín as Señorita Miriam, her daughter
- Manuel Zarzo as Don Manuel, the doctor

== Production ==
The distinctive landscapes are of the region of Extremadura, around the towns of Alburquerque and Zafra. Its distinctive soundtrack is played wholly on a three-stringed rabel, a folk instrument dating back to medieval times.

== Release ==
The film was released theatrically in Spain on 4 April 1984.

== See also ==
- List of Spanish films of 1984
