= And the Crows Will Dig Your Grave =

1971 Spanish film directed by Juan Bosch

- Directed by: Juan Bosch
- Screenplay by: Juan Bosch; Lou Carrigan; Roberto Gianviti
- Story by: Juan Bosch
- Produced by: Fabio Diotallevi; Manuel Rubio Puerta
- Cinematography: Giancarlo Ferrando
- Edited by: Luis Puigvert
- Music by: Bruno Nicolai
- Production companies: Devon Film; Midega Film
- Distributed by: Warner Bros.
- Release date: 11 August 1971 (Italy)
- Running time: 82 min
- Countries: Spain; Italy

And the Crows Will Dig Your Grave (Spanish: Los buitres cavarán tu fosa, Italian: I corvi ti scaveranno la fossa) is a 1971 Spanish western film directed by Juan Bosch and starring Craig Hill, Fernando Sancho and Dominique Boschero. It is composed by Bruno Nicolai.

== Cast ==
- Craig Hill as Jeff Sullivan
- Fernando Sancho as Pancho Corrales
- Maria Pia Conte as Susan
- Frank Brana as Glenn Kovac
- Dominique Boschero as Myra
- Raf Baldassarre as Sheriff of Silver Town
- Joaquín Díaz as Ted Salomon
- Carlos Ronda as Sheriff of Lost Valley
- Antonio Molino Rojo as El Rojo
- Juan Torres as Manuel
- Indio González as Corrales' Man
- Ivano Staccioli as Donovan
- Ángel Aranda as Dan Barker
- José Antonio Amor as Jerry
- Raúl Aparici as Emisario
- Manuel Bronchud as Mejicano
- Fernando de Miragaya as García
- Loredana Montiel as Rosita
- Ricardo Moyán as Dawson
- Isidro Novellas as Capitán del campo de trabajo
