= Taste of Vengeance =

1968 film

- Directed by: Mario Siciliano
- Written by: Ernesto Gastaldi; Mario Siciliano; Duilio Chianetta
- Starring: Gianni Garko; Ivan Rassimov
- Cinematography: Gino Santini
- Edited by: Romeo Ciatti
- Music by: Gianni Marchetti
- Release date: 1968
- Country: Italy

Taste of Vengeance (Italian: I vigliacchi non pregano, Spanish: El vengador del sur), also known as Cowards Don't Pray, is a 1968 Spaghetti Western film co-written and directed by Mario Siciliano under the pseudonym Marlon Sirko.

== Cast ==
- Gianni Garko as Bryan Clarke
- Ivan Rassimov as Daniel
- Elisa Montés as Julie
- Jerry Wilson as Robert
- Carla Calò as Miss Douglas
- José Jaspe as Feelty Bottle
- Maria Mizar as Saloon-keeper
- Alan Collins as Bill Perkins
- Manuel Galiana as Art Blake
- Miguel Del Castillo as Blake's father
- Giovanni Ivan Scratuglia as William Douglas
- Lorenzo Robledo as Ringleader
- Julio Peña as John Murray
- Marco Morelli as Felix Perkins
- Luis Barboo as Romero
- Frank Braña as Rod
- Luis Induni as Tom

== Production ==
The film is an Italian-Spanish co-production by Matheus Film and Copercines. It was shot between Guadix, Banos de Alicun de las Torres in Villanueva de las Torres, Aldea del Fresno, Fonelas, Elios Studios in Rome and Madrid. It had as working titles L'amaro sapore della vendetta ('The bitter taste of revenge') and Ho visto un teschio e una pistola ('I saw a skull and a gun'). Gianni Marchetti served as composer, though in the official credits he was replaced by Spanish composer Manuel Parada, a choice made to obtain funding from the Spanish government.

== Reception ==
While reviewing the film, Italian critic Marco Giusti noted that "it's fascinating to observe how the director and writers approached the character's complexity". Thomas Weisser described it as "an interesting film with more depth and character development than the genre usually tends to offer".
