= Ángel Aranda =

Spanish actor (1934–2024)

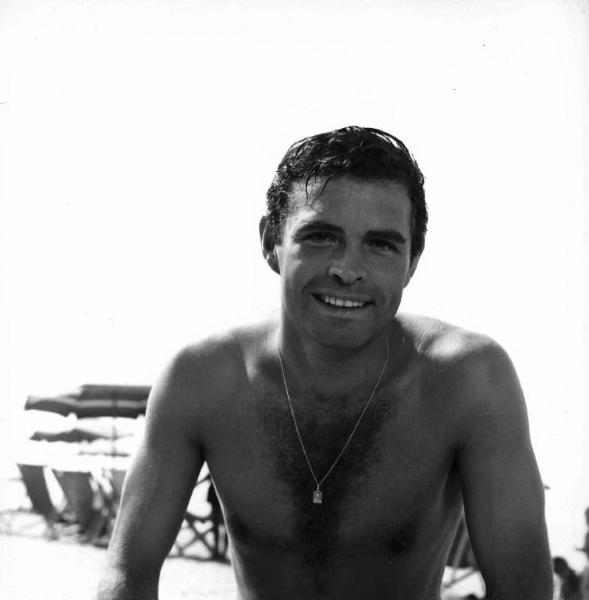
- Born: Ángel Pérez Aranda; 18 September 1934; Jaén, Spain
- Died: 21 April 2024 (aged 89); Málaga, Spain
- Occupation: Actor
- Years active: 1955–1980

Ángel Aranda (18 September 1934 – 21 April 2024) was a Spanish film actor. He appeared in more than 40 films between 1955 and 1980. He was born in Andalucía on 18 September 1934, and died in Málaga on 20 April 2024, at the age of 89.

== Partial filmography ==
- El guardián del paraíso (1955)
- Embajadores en el infierno (1956) - Giovanni
- Susanna tutta panna (1957) - (uncredited)
- Femmine tre volte (1957) - Atleta italiana di baseball
- Marisa (1957) - Luccicotto
- 15 bajo la lona (1959) - Eduardo
- Molokai, la isla maldita (1959)
- They Fired with Their Lives (1959) - Falin
- El día de los enamorados (1959) - Emilio
- The Last Days of Pompeii (1959) - Antoninus Marcus
- The Big Show (1960) - Rudolf
- Un trono para Cristy (1960) - Ángel Reynosa
- Goliath Against the Giants (1961) - (uncredited)
- The Colossus of Rhodes (1961)
- Todos eran culpables (1962)
- La bella di Lodi (1963) - Franco Garbagnati
- Donde tú estés (1964) - Gunther Franck
- Bullets Don't Argue (1964) - George Clanton
- Diálogos de la paz (1965) - Julio
- Planet of the Vampires (1965) - Wess Wescant
- El Greco (1966) - Don Luis
- Che notte ragazzi! (1966) - (uncredited)
- The Hellbenders (1967) - Nat
- Cervantes (1967) - (uncredited)
- Javier y los invasores del espacio (1967)
- Fedra West (1968)
- La legge della violenza - Tutti o nessuno (1969) - Chris, the sheriff
- Susana (1969) - Pepe
- The Arizona Kid (1970)
- Underground (1970) - Sam Baxter
- Investigación criminal (1970) - Fernando Olmos
- Historia de una chica sola (1971) - Carlos
- La casa de los Martínez (1971) - Recién casado
- Los buitres cavarán tu fosa (1971) - Dan Barker
- La graduada (1971) - Don Carlos
- The Heroes (1973) - Cowlich
- Storia di karatè, pugni e fagioli (1973) - Clint Goldenhand
- Ten Killers Came from Afar (1974)
- A Dragonfly for Each Corpse (1975) - Pietro Volpini
- Marilyne (1976)
- El avispero (1976)
- Deseo (1976)
- Escalofrío (1978) - Bruno
- From Hell to Victory (1979) - (uncredited)
- Le c... de Marilyne (1980) - Padilla
