= Juan Miguel Solano =

Spanish actor

Juan Miguel Solano is a Spanish actor.

He played Luis in El misterio de la vida (1972), directed by Jaime Jesús Balcázar and starring Mónica Randall, Dominique Simpson and Joaquín Díaz. He appeared in Stagecoach of the Condemned (1970).

== Filmography ==
- ¿Y ahora qué, señor fiscal? (1977) as Luis
- Devil's Kiss (1976) as Jean
- Killing of the Dolls (1975) as Novio de la chica de la rosa
- Dallas (1974) as Bright Brother
- Barcelona Kill (1973) as Policía
- They Believed He Was No Saint (1972) as Apache Joe
- My Horse, My Gun, Your Widow (1972) as Confederate Army Lieutenant
- Señora casada necesita joven bien dotado (1971)
- El misterio de la vida (1970) as Luis
- Stagecoach of the Condemned (1970) as Cowboy
- Twenty Paces to Death (1970)
- La piel quemada (1967) as Fernando
- Ruthless Colt of the Gringo (1966) as Hamner
- Man from Canyon City (1965)
