= The Blood Spattered Bride =

1972 Spanish film by Vicente Aranda

- Spanish theatrical release poster
- Spanish: La novia ensangrentada
- Directed by: Vicente Aranda
- Written by: Vicente Aranda
- Based on: Carmilla by Sheridan Le Fanu
- Produced by: Jaime Fernadez-Cid
- Starring: Simón Andreu; Maribel Martín; Alexandra Bastedo; Dean Selmier
- Cinematography: Fernando Arribas
- Edited by: Pablo Gonzalez del Amo
- Music by: Antonio Pérez Olea
- Distributed by: Morgana Films
- Release date: 30 September 1972 (Spain)
- Running time: 100 minutes
- Country: Spain
- Language: Spanish

The Blood Spattered Bride (Spanish: La novia ensangrentada) is a 1972 Spanish horror film written and directed by Vicente Aranda, based on the 1872 vampire novella Carmilla by Joseph Sheridan Le Fanu. It stars Simón Andreu, Maribel Martín, and Alexandra Bastedo. The film attained cult film status for its mix of horror, vampirism, rejection of fascism, and progressive ideas on gender and sexuality. A well-known US trailer advertising a double feature of this film paired with the 1974 horror film I Dismember Mama was filmed in the style of a news report covering the "story" of an audience member who had gone insane while watching the films.

== Plot ==
Susan, a newly married young woman still wearing her bridal gown, leaves on her honeymoon with her new husband and eventually arrives at a hotel. Another woman seems to be stalking the couple from her position in a nearby car and when Susan is left alone in the room for just a few moments, she has a violent fantasy of a strange man leaping out of the closet and raping her. After her husband returns, she insists on leaving, which they do.

The couple arrives at the husband's family home. The wife sees the woman from the hotel in the woods on the property but she does not tell her husband. Susan notices in the house that there are paintings of male ancestors, but none of the wives. She is told by the servants' daughter that the wives' paintings are in the cellar. Susan notices that one of the paintings of the wives has the face cut out of it. Susan's husband tells her that the woman in the painting is named Mircala Karstein, one of his ancestors, who two hundred years before murdered her husband on their wedding night because he supposedly made her commit unspeakable acts. Susan has violent dreams involving the mysterious woman she has been seeing. She wakes up and finds a dagger under her pillow. Susan starts to become detached from her husband. The husband calls on a doctor to figure out why she is having all of these dreams and what is wrong with her. Soon, Mircala is invading Susan's dreams, persuading her to use a mysterious dagger, which keeps reappearing no matter where it is hidden, to butcher Susan's husband as Mircala did hers.

One day while strolling out on the beach, the husband discovers a naked woman buried in the sand; only her snorkel provides air. He digs her out and takes her home, where she reveals herself to be Carmila. Susan falls under the spell of Carmila, a vampire who seduces her and drinks her blood. The husband finally catches on that Carmila is really his ancestor Mircala Karstein and that his life is in danger. The repressed Susan's desires are awakened in the intense lesbian love affair and she embarks on a spree of bloody mayhem. They kill the doctor, the guardian of the property, and they try to kill the husband, too, but he kills them while the two women are resting in their coffins as vampires. After this happens, the servant's daughter arrives and reveals that she was bitten too; she then kneels and allows him to shoot her once in the head. He returns to the coffin with a dagger and the scene cuts to a newspaper column declaring Man cuts out the hearts of three women, suggesting that the husband was found and arrested for the three murders.

== Cast ==
- Simón Andreu as the husband
- Maribel Martín as Susan
- Alexandra Bastedo as Carmila/Mircala Karstein
- Rosa Maria Rodriguez as Carol
- Dean Selmier as the doctor
- Ángel Lombarte as Carol's father
- Montserrat Julió as Carol's mother

== Reception ==
On review aggregator website Rotten Tomatoes, the film holds an approval rating of 100% based on 5 reviews, with an average rating of 7.0/10.

== Kill Bill: Volume 1 ==
Director Quentin Tarantino named a chapter in his 2003 film Kill Bill: Volume 1 after The Blood Spattered Bride.

== DVD and Blu-ray releases ==
The film was first shown in the US under the title Till Death Do Us Part in an edited version and then was released on DVD unedited and uncensored as The Blood Spattered Bride. The DVD was first released by Anchor Bay Entertainment on 30 January 2001. It is presented in the English language; no subtitles or additional audio tracks are provided. The film was later reissued on DVD by Blue Underground, first as part of a two-disc set with another lesbian vampire film from the early 1970s, Daughters of Darkness, and then separately. In 2017, the film received a Blu-ray release from Mondo Macabro which featured English and Spanish language tracks and deleted scenes, including an alternate ending.
