= Fortunata y Jacinta (TV series) =

Spanish limited television series

- Genre: Historical drama
- Based on: Fortunata y Jacinta by Benito Pérez Galdós
- Directed by: Mario Camus
- Starring: Ana Belén; Maribel Martín
- Composer: Antón García Abril
- Country of origin: Spain
- Original language: Spanish
- No. of seasons: 1
- No. of episodes: 10

Production
- Running time: ~ 60 min per episode
- Production companies: Televisión Española; Telefrance; Telvetia

Original release
- Network: TVE-1
- Release: 7 May – 22 May 1980

Fortunata y Jacinta is a 1980 limited television series consisting of an adaptation of the 1887 Benito Pérez Galdós' novel Fortunata y Jacinta. Directed by Mario Camus, it was produced by Televisión Española (TVE) in collaboration with French TeleFrance and Swiss Telvetia. It starred Ana Belén as Fortunata and Maribel Martín as Jacinta. It originally aired on the flagship TVE channel.

== Premise ==
The fiction is set in Madrid from 1869 to 1876. It tracks the lives of the well-off Jacinta (Maribel Martín) and the lower-class Fortunata (Ana Belén) as well as their families and neighbors, depicting features such as the poverty, malice, greedness or social privilege of the time.

== Cast ==
- Ana Belén as Fortunata.
- Maribel Martín as Jacinta.
- François-Éric Gendron as Juanito Santa Cruz.
- Mario Pardo as Maximiliano Rubín.
- Paco Algora as Nicolás.
- Fernando Fernán Gómez as Evaristo Feijoo.
- Charo López as Mauricia la Dura.
- Mary Carrillo as Barbarita.
- Francisco Rabal as José Izquierdo.
- Berta Riaza as Guillermina Pacheco.
- Luisa Ponte as Doña Lupe la de los Pavos.
- Mirta Miller as Aurora.
- Francisco Marsó as Villalonga.

== Production and release ==
Fortunata y Jacinta was directed by Mario Camus. Produced by Televisión Española (TVE) in collaboration with French TeleFrance and Swiss Telvetia, the series had a 160 million peseta budget, an expensive budget at the time. It was filmed from 14 May to 5 December 1979. Besides the lavish set prepared to represent the Madrilenian Plaza de Pontejos, outdoor scenes were also shot in Madrid, Aranjuez, Boadilla del Monte, Villaviciosa de Odón, Toledo, Comillas, Burgos and Seville.

The series consisted of ten episodes with a running time of roughly 60 minutes.

It originally aired on TVE-1 from 7 May 1980 to 22 May 1980. The series re-aired in Spain multiple times: 1983 (TVE-2), 1987 (TVE-1), 2005 (Canal Nostalgia) and 2007 (TVE 50 Años). It was broadcast again on La 2 in 2020 on the occasion of the "Galdosian year".

It was released in VHS format in 1994 and in DVD format in 2004.
