= Death of a Bureaucrat =

- Spanish: La muerte de un burócrata
- Directed by: Tomás Gutiérrez Alea
- Screenplay by: Tomás Gutiérrez Alea
- Starring: Salvador Wood; Silvia Planas; Manuel Estanillo
- Cinematography: Ramón F. Suárez
- Edited by: Mario González
- Music by: Leo Brouwer
- Production company: Instituto Cubano del Arte e Industrias Cinematográficos
- Release date: 24 July 1966
- Running time: 85 minutes
- Country: Cuba
- Language: Spanish

Death of a Bureaucrat (Spanish: La muerte de un burócrata) is a 1966 comedy film by Cuban director Tomás Gutiérrez Alea which pokes fun at the Communist bureaucracy and red tape and how it affects the lives of the common people who have to waste time and overcome hurdles just to get on with their ordinary lives.

"It is, as the title suggests, a satire on bureaucracy and red tape, but also on a lot of other sad and mediocre things which we have to put up with at times. However, I have to say that I don’t have much faith in the efficacy of satire as a “driving force of history.” When making the film we thought: we are laughing at the bureaucrats, but then the bureaucrats will come and not only will the film make them laugh, but they will laugh at themselves."
— Tomás Gutiérrez Alea, Director’s Statement, La Biennale di Venezia

== Plot ==
The story begins with the death of a model worker, who is buried with his labor card as a badge of honor. However, his widow is told she needs that card to claim the benefits she is entitled to. The story then takes several surreal turns, as the family of the dead man tries to recover the precious card from the grave. But, since there is no record of the body being exhumed, the bureaucracy turns down the family's wish to re-bury the body, because all the official documents show the deceased has already been buried...

== Cast ==
- Salvador Wood as Nephew
- Silvia Planas as Aunt
- Manuel Estanillo as Bureaucrat
- Omar Alfonso as Cojimar
- Tania Alvarado
- Pedro Pablo Astorga
- Alicia Bustamante
- Gaspar De Santelices as Nephew's boss
- Rafael Díaz
- Roberto Gacio
- Carlos Gargallo
- Elsa Montero as Sabor
- Rolando de los Reyes
- Fausto Rodríguez
- Luis Romay as El Zorro
- Carlos Ruiz de la Tejera as Psychiatrist
- Rafael Sosa
- Richard Suarez as Tarafa
- Rolando Vidal
- Laura Zarrabeitia

== Distribution ==
"The film was wildly popular in Cuban theatres, but, reportedly, because of its bitter mockery of key elements in Cuba’s emerging socialist society, Alea had to have the film smuggled out of Cuba for its release in the US."

== Awards ==
Special Jury Prize – Karlovy Vary International Film Festival, shared with Jean-Paul Rappeneau's La Vie de château

== Reception ==
"A satiric comment on contemporary Cuban society, it is also a film deeply attuned to the history of the cinema, with references to and echoes of Chaplin, Laurel & Hardy, and Buñuel, among others, all cited in the opening credits."

"It is a black-and-white, full-length comedy about a country which has undergone a socialist revolution and now insists its bureaucrats provide equal treatment for all, including the dead. The newly socialist country is a thinly veiled Cuba, and the comedic twists and characters reminiscent of Hollywood comedy traditions and stars such as Charles Chaplin, Laurel and Hardy, Buster Keaton and even Marilyn Monroe; also included is a touch of surrealism and black humor reminiscent of Buñuel."

== Allusions ==
The machinery of the Martí bust factory references Chaplin's Modern Times. The fight at the cemetery gates references Laurel & Hardy's fights. Juanchin's dreams reference Buñuel's An Andalusian Dog.

Alea dedicates, in the initial credits, to these, Ingmar Bergman, Akira Kurosawa and other film directors.

== Preservation ==
La Muerte de un Burócrata was preserved by the Academy Film Archive in 2019.

== See also ==
- List of Cuban films
