= Mario Missiroli =

Italian stage and film director (1934–2014)

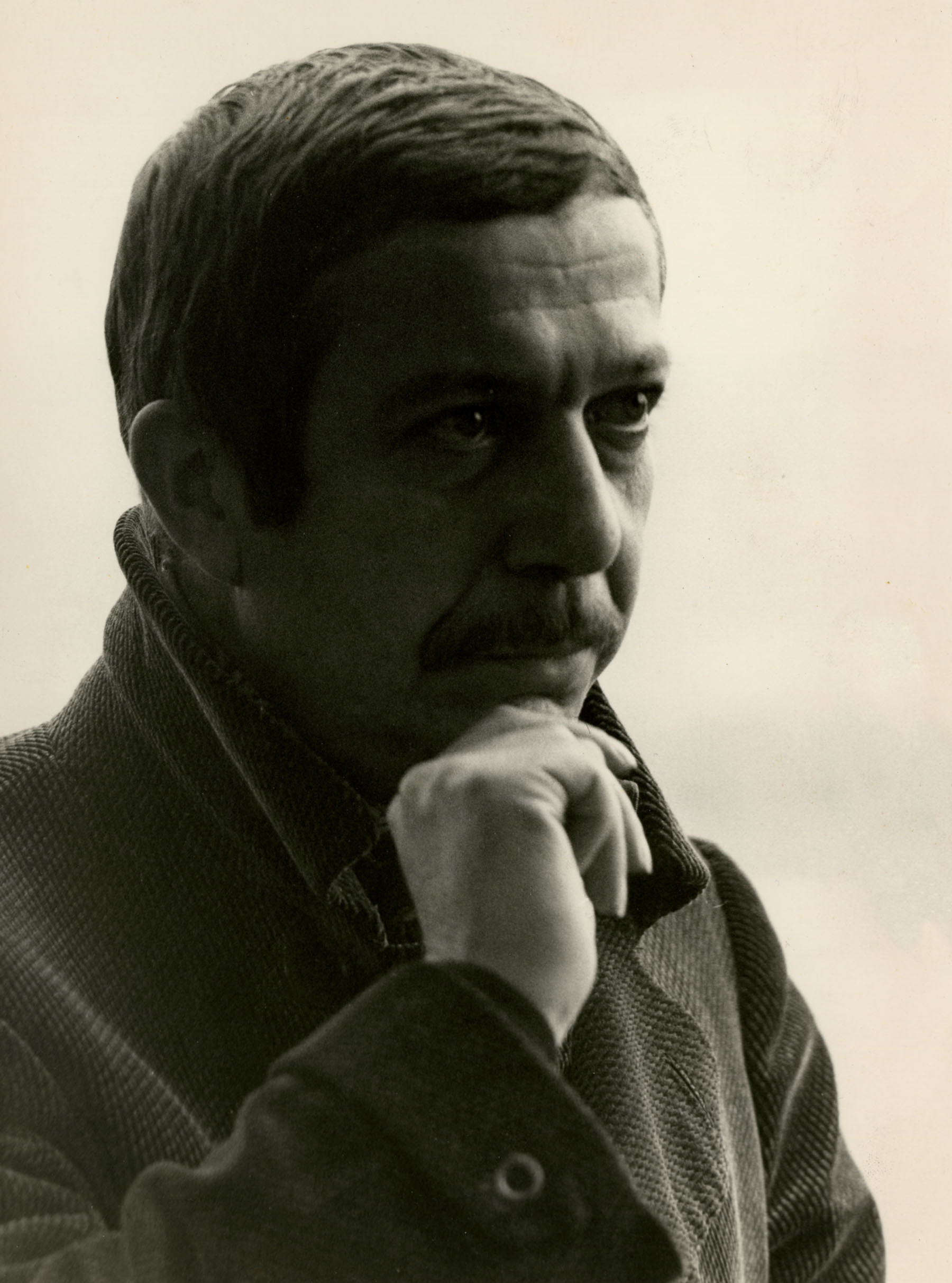
- Born: 13 March 1934; Bergamo, Italy
- Died: 19 May 2014 (aged 80); Turin, Italy
- Occupation: Director

Mario Missiroli (13 March 1934 – 19 May 2014) was an Italian stage, television and film director.

Born in Bergamo, at a young age Missiroli moved to Milan with his family. Later. he graduated in direction from the Accademia d'Arte Drammatica in Rome.

In the 1950s Missiroli worked at the Piccolo Teatro in Milan as assistant director of Giorgio Strehler and in cinema he debuted as assistant director of Valerio Zurlini. In 1963 he directed his first and only film, La bella di Lodi, based on a novel by Alberto Arbasino and starring Stefania Sandrelli. In later years Missiroli focused his activities on theatre, in which he was regarded as having been one of the most innovative and nonconformist directors as well as being one of the fathers of Italian modern theatre. From 1976 to 1985 he was director of the Teatro Stabile di Torino (it). He was also active as a television director, mainly of literary adaptations.
