= Ricardo Sanz (film producer) =

Spanish film producer

Ricardo Sanz is a Spanish film producer. He began working as the manager of Carlos Aguilar father's production company. He owned Astro CC in which he produced along Lea Films Una bala marcada (1972), Tu fosa será la exacta... amigo (1972) and El hombre que mató a Billy el Niño (1966), all directed by Juan Bosch. He also produced I quattro inesorabili (1965), directed by Primo Zeglio.

== Filmography ==
- Tiempos duros para Drácula (1976)
- La mujer es cosa de hombres (1976)
- A Dragonfly for Each Corpse (1975)
- The Loreley's Grasp (1973)
- My Horse, My Gun, Your Widow (1972)
- God in Heaven... Arizona on Earth (1972)
- His Name Was Holy Ghost (1972)
- Todos los colores de la oscuridad (1972)
- Churchill's Leopards (1970)
- Awkward Hands (1970)
- I'll Kill Him and Return Alone (1967)
- Caña brava (1966)
- The Relentless Four (1965)
- Hands of a Gunfighter (1965)
- El tulipán negro (1964)
- Los dinamiteros (1964)
- El balcón de la Luna (1962)
- Madame (1961)
- Los económicamente débiles (1960)
- Sólo para hombres (1960)
- La fiel infantería (1960)
- Trío de damas (1960)
- Los tramposos (1959)
- Luna de verano (1959)
- Ana dice sí (1958)
- El Cristo de los Faroles (1958)
- El andén (1957)
- Fulano y Mengano (1957)
- La hija de Juan Simón (1957)
- Saeta rubia (1956)
- Suspenso en comunismo (1956)
- El tren expreso (1955)
- Cómicos (1954)
- Cabaret (1953)
- La revoltosa (1950)

== Bibliography ==
- Márquez Úbeda, José (1 January 1999). Almería, plató de cine. Instituto de Estudios Almerienses. p. 435. ISBN 9788481081824.
