= La bella di Lodi =

- Directed by: Mario Missiroli
- Starring: Stefania Sandrelli; Ángel Aranda
- Cinematography: Tonino Delli Colli
- Edited by: Nino Baragli
- Music by: Piero Umiliani
- Release date: 1963
- Country: Italy
- Language: Italian

La bella di Lodi is a 1963 Italian comedy film directed by Mario Missiroli. It is based on the novel with the same name written by Alberto Arbasino.

In 2008 it was restored and shown as part of the retrospective "Questi fantasmi: Cinema italiano ritrovato" at the 65th Venice International Film Festival.

== Synopsis ==
Roberta and Franco met by chance on a beach near Marina di Pietrasanta one summer afternoon. They started a relationship that led them to different places in northern Italy: Modena, Bologna, Venice, and Lodi. The girl even lived in a highway motel for a while just to be close to her lover, hoping to shape him and introduce him to the business world, ultimately aiming to turn him into a commercial manager in the automotive sector.

== Cast ==
- Stefania Sandrelli as Roberta
- Ángel Aranda as Franco Garbagnati
- Elena Borgo as grandmother of Roberta
- Maria Monti as Annamaria
- Giuliano Pogliani
- Cesare Di Montagnano
- Gianni Clerici
- Renato Montalbano
- Mario Missiroli
