= Ricardo López Aranda =

Spanish playwright (1934–1996)

Ricardo López Aranda (20 December 1934 – 25 November 1996) was a Spanish playwright, born in Santander in 1934. In 1941 his family home was destroyed by the Santander fire. In 1958 he received the National University Theater Prize for his play "Nunca amanecerá" and published a version of Oedipus (also titled "La Esfinge sin Secreto"). In 1960, his work "Cerca de las estrellas" received the National Calderón de la Barca Theater prize and in 1961 the Aguilar prize. The play was presented at the National Teatro María Guerrero that same year and taken to the cinema in 1962. In 1964 he wrote "Noches de San Juan", which received the runner-up of theLope de Vega award and was presented at the María Guerrero National Theater in 1965.

Many of the works written during this period, including the most successful ones, "Cerca de las estrellas" and "Noches de San Juan", are part of the Spanish realist movement . At the same time, he writes a series of plays that he dubbed Theater of Cruelty ("la cita", "el asedio", "los laberintos, "el funcionario", "la espera").

A third group of works, which include the aforementioned Oedipus, and, between 1963 and 1964 "Yo, Martín Lutero" and the trilogy "Mario", "Sila" and "César" address major issues such as faith, freedom and power with language of tragedy. "Yo, Martín Lutero" was forbidden by Franco's regime cesnsorship when it was already being rehearsed.

He subsequently wrote several plays for children: the original musical "El Cocherito Leré ", and adaptations of The Blue Bird and Don Quixote, also premiered at the María Guerrero Theater respectively in 1966, 1967 and 1973.

Between 1965 and 1971, he carried out numerous adaptations for television. In 1971, he received the Golden Quixote award for scripts of the television series "Páginas Sueltas" and in 1978 wrote "El juglar y la reina".

In 1969, he premiered in Madrid, an adaptation of Benito Pérez Galdós' novel Fortunata y Jacinta. The play would be re-released at the Santander International Festival in 1993 & at the Teatro Español in Madrid in 1994. He would also cowrite, in 1977, the scripts for a television series based on the novel.

In addition, he wrote scripts for several films: "Cerca de las Estrellas" (1962), "Marta" (1970), "Tormento" (1973) and co-wrote the script of the film Fortunata y Jacinta (1969). He drew inspiration from the work of Arthur Miller for his screenplays.

He refrained from making public most of his poetry during this period. Only at the end of his life did he publish his book "El crisantemo y la cometa", written in 1971, and his "Biografía secreta" is posthumous. He is left a number of unpublished novels and essays.

Between 1972 and 1977 he premiered a good number of adaptations of novels and classic plays, including El Buscón, and wrote several original works: "Las herderas del sol", "Los extraños amantes", and "Un periodista español" (based on the life of Mariano José de Larra).

In 1978, "Isabelita la Miracielos" premieres in Madrid, depictig the atmosphere during Spanish transition to democracy. In 1982 he moved to Mexico, where he wrote the scripts for the television series Leona Vicario. In 1983 he premiered in Madris "Isabel, reina de corazones", inspired on the life of Queen Isabel II of Spain.

In 1998 the Spanish Association of Playwrights published an anthology of his theatre.

In 1998, the Santander City Council established the Ricardo López Aranda International Theater Award, which is currently a biennial.

== Awards ==
- Premio Nacional de Teatro Universitario (1958) for Nunca amanecerá - 1st prize
- Premio de periodismo Santo Tomás de Aquino (1958) for his article Hacia una universidad mejor
- Premio Nacional de Teatro Calderón de la Barca (1960) for Cerca de las Estrellas
- Premio Aguilar 1960-1961 for Cerca de las Estrellas
- Accésit to the Premio Lope de Vega (1964) for Noches de San Juan
- Premio Quijote de Oro (1971) for the TV script Páginas Sueltas
- Premio María Rolland (1983) for Isabel, reina de corazones

== Works ==
=== Theatre ===
- Nunca amanecerá, 1958
- La esfinge sin secreto, 1958
- Cerca de las estrellas, 1960
- Yo, Martín Lutero, 1964
- Noches de San Juan, 1965
- El cocherito leré, 1966
- Los extraños amantes, 1974
- Isabelita la miracielos, 1978
- Isabel, reina de corazones, 1984

He is also known for his dramatic interpretation of Galdos's novel Fortunata y Jacinta, both on the stage and on television.
