= Forget the Drums =

- Film poster
- Spanish: Olvida los tambores
- Directed by: Rafael Gil
- Written by: Ana Diosdado
- Starring: Julián Mateos; Maribel Martín; Tony Isbert
- Cinematography: José F. Aguayo
- Edited by: José Luis Matesanz
- Music by: Gregorio García Segura
- Production companies: Coral Producciones Cinematográficas; Rafael Gil Álvarez
- Distributed by: United International Pictures
- Release date: 1975
- Running time: 89 minutes
- Country: Spain
- Language: Spanish

Forget the Drums (Spanish: Olvida los tambores) is a 1975 Spanish comedy film directed by Rafael Gil and starring Julián Mateos, Maribel Martín, and Tony Isbert.

== Cast ==
- Julián Mateos
- Maribel Martín
- Tony Isbert
- Jaime Blanch
- Mary Paz Pondal
- José María Guillén
- Verónica Llimerá
- José Antonio Ferrer
- Antonio del Real
- Abel Vitón
- Carlos Ballesteros as Nacho
- Cristina Galbó as Pili
