= Esteban Dalmases =

Spanish actor

Esteban Dalmases is a Spanish actor.

He played 1st Inspector in Devil's Kiss (1976), directed by Georges Gigo; and sheriff assistant in Four Candles for Garringo (1971), directed by Ignacio F. Iquino and starring Robert Woods.

== Filmography ==
- La rebelión de los pájaros (1982)
- Los embarazados (1982) as Miembro de la junta
- El vicari d'Olot (1981) as Metge
- Estigma (1980) as Hombre en funeral
- The Truth on the Savolta Affair (1980) as Acompañante de Pujol
- Los bingueros (1979) as Binguero (uncredited)
- La triple muerte del tercer personaje (1979)
- Cuarenta años sin sexo (1979) as Marido en juicio
- Óscar, Kina y el láser (1978) as Piloto
- Espectro (Más allá del fin del mundo) (1978) as Pueblerino
- Los violadores del amanecer (1978) as Padre de Elisa
- El despertar de los sentidos (1977)
- Es muß nicht immer Kaviar sein (1977)
- Devil's Kiss (1976) as 1st Inspector
- Guapa, rica y... especial (1976) as Invitado de la fiesta
- Los casados y la menor (1975) as Miembro de la junta
- Exorcismo (1975) as Policía (uncredited)
- Killing of the Dolls (1975) as Invitado de la fiesta
- El último proceso en París (1974) as Miembro del jurado
- The Killer Wore Gloves (1974) as Camarero
- Dallas (1974) as Brownville Deputy
- Los Kalatrava contra el imperio del karate (1974) as Policía
- Primavera mortal (1973)
- Aborto criminal (1973) as Miembro del tribunal
- They Believed He Was No Saint (1972) as Hombre de Travers
- My Horse, My Gun, Your Widow (1972) as Deputy
- God in Heaven... Arizona on Earth (1972) as Rancher
- El triangulito (1972) as Encargado del párking
- La liga no es cosa de hombres (1972) as Directivo del club
- Four Candles for Garringo (1971) as Ayudante del Sheriff
- Dig Your Grave Friend... Sabata's Coming (1971) as Thomas - ayudante del Sheriff
- Presagio (1970) as Invitado de la fiesta
- Versatile Lovers (1970) as Un client du club
- La banda de los tres crisantemos (1970) as Cajero
