= Dr. Jekyll y el Hombre Lobo =

- Directed by: León Klimovsky
- Written by: Jacinto Molina
- Produced by: Alfredo Fraile; Arturo González
- Starring: Paul Naschy; Shirley Corrigan; Jack Taylor; Mirta Miller
- Cinematography: Francisco Fraile
- Edited by: Petra de Nieva
- Music by: Antón García Abril
- Distributed by: Regia-Arturo González Rodríguez (Spain, theatrical), Filmaco (USA, theatrical)
- Release dates: November 13, 1972 (Spain); 1973 (U.S.)
- Running time: 96 minutes
- Country: Spain
- Language: Spanish

Dr. Jekyll y el Hombre Lobo (Dr. Jekyll and the Wolfman), also known as Dr. Jekyll and the Werewolf, is a 1971 Spanish horror film, the sixth in a series of 12 films about the werewolf Count Waldemar Daninsky, played by Paul Naschy. Naschy actually plays a triple role in the film, portraying Waldemar Daninsky, the Wolf Man and Mr. Hyde. This was Naschy's 2nd film working with director Leon Klimovsky, following their hugely successful 1970 collaboration La Noche de Walpurgis. This film also featured Euro-Horror star Jack Taylor, Mirta Miller and the beautiful Shirley Corrigan of England. The film failed however to reach the box office success of Walpurgis.

The film was in production from November to December 1971. The film was released in Spain on November 13, 1972 as Dr. Jekyll y el Hombre Lobo, in the U.S. in 1973 as Dr. Jekyll and the Wolfman, and in Germany in 1974 as Night of the Bloody Wolves. It was released in the UK in 1973 as Dr. Jekyll and the Werewolf.

It was followed by a 1973 sequel, El Retorno de Walpurgis (aka Curse of the Devil).

== Plot ==
A young, wealthy Spanish landowner, Waldemar Daninsky, aka "El Hombre Lobo" (The Wolfman), searches for a cure to his lycanthropy. He travels to London to consult with the infamous Dr. Henry Jekyll's grandson. The doctor prescribes a serum that transforms the werewolf into a bestial Hyde-like personality. It is theorized that Mr. Hyde's superhuman ego will sublimate Daninsky's werewolf identity and eradicate it.

Unfortunately, the procedure results in an even more savage monster than before, since the werewolf only killed against his will, but Mr. Hyde actually enjoys the sadistic acts he commits. The violence is over the top in the scenes where Mr. Hyde ties up two women and brutally whips them nearly to death. The film also contains some unusual transformation scenes, one wherein Daninsky turns into the Wolf Man in a stalled elevator in which he is trapped with a young nurse, and another where he transforms in the middle of a crowded discotheque illuminated by weird strobe light effects.

Henry Jekyll winds up getting stabbed to death by Sandra, a jilted lab assistant/ lover, and the Wolf Man is shot dead with silver bullets, fired by Justine, a woman who loved him enough to end his torment.

== Cast ==
- Paul Naschy as Waldemar Daninsky/Wolfman/Mr. Hyde
- Jack Taylor as Dr. Henry Jekyll
- Shirley Corrigan as Justine
- Mirta Miller as Sandra, Jekyll's lab assistant
- José Marco as Imre Kosta
- Luis Induni as Otvos, the local village gang leader
- Luis Gaspar as Thurko, Otvos's thug
- Bernabe Barta Barri as Gyogyo, the innkeeper
- Elsa Zabala as Uswika Bathory, Waldemar's guardian
- Lucy Tiller as whore
- Jorge Vico as party guest
- Adolfo Thous as party guest
- Monteserrat Julió as Agatha, a party guest
- Marisol Delgado as Nurse in elevator

== Production ==
Famed Euro-horror star Jack Taylor was praised for his "wonderfully nuanced performance" as Dr. Henry Jekyll.

This was the only time that the two sets of characters, Jekyll/Hyde and the Wolf Man, appeared together in the same movie.

== Release ==
Two different versions of the film were made, a somewhat censored, clothed version for Spanish theaters and an international "unclothed" version to be distributed outside of Spain. The uncensored version was released on DVD by Code Red (on a double disc with The Vampires' Night Orgy), and the "clothed" edition was released on a British DVD by Mondo Macabro.
