= Dyanik Zurakowska =

Belgian actress

- Born: 22 March 1947; Élisabethville, Belgian Congo
- Died: 24 January 2011 (aged 63); Málaga, Spain
- Occupation: Actress
- Years active: 1965–1977

Dyanik Zurakowska (born 22 March 1947) was a Belgian actress. She appeared in more than forty films from 1965 to 1977.

== Selected filmography ==
Year	Title	Role	Notes
1966	Fantasia 3	Coralina	
1966	Target Goldseven	Mitzi	credited as Diannyk Zurakowska
1967	Two Crosses at Danger Pass	Gloria Moran	
1968	Ringo the Lone Rider		
1968	One by One	Dolly	
1968	The Mark of the Wolfman	Janice	
1968	Dead Men Don't Count	Elizabeth	
1972	The Vampires Night Orgy	Alma	
1973	The Hanging Woman	Doris Drolla	
