= Luis Induni =

Italian actor

- Born: 5 March 1920; Romano Canavese, Piedmont, Italy
- Died: 31 December 1979 (aged 59); Barcelona, Spain
- Occupation: Film actor

Luis Induni (5 March 1920 – 31 December 1979) was an Italian film actor of the 1950s, 1960s and 1970s.

He made his debut in the western film Billy the Kid (1964) along with George Martin and Jack Taylor, and then he appeared in mostly Spaghetti Western Italian films starring as a sheriff, including Black Beauty in 1971, although his roles later in the 1970s extended to many other genres such as the 1972 horror film Dr. Jekyll y el Hombre Lobo. He also appeared in Taste of Vengeance (1968), Dallas (1972), Damned Pistols of Dallas (1964), Woman for Ringo (1966), Mister Dynamit - Morgen küßt euch der Tod (1967), The Magnificent Texan (1967), and El hombre que mató a Billy el Niño (1967).

He appeared in the police drama film Duda (1951).

He died on 31 December 1979.

== Selected filmography ==
- The King's Mail (1951)
- Service at Sea (1951)
- Doubt (1951)
- Magic Concert (1953)
- One Bullet Is Enough (1954)
- The Cock Crow (1955)
- Marta (1955)
- Miracle of the White Suit (1956)
- Call Esteban (1960)
- The Big Show (1960)
- Green Harvest (1961)
- Anchor Button (1961)
- The Blackmailers (1963)
- Cavalca e uccidi (1964)
- Gibraltar (1964)
- Pedrito de Andía's New Life (1965)
- Canadian Wilderness (1965)
- The Magnificent Texan (1967)
- Taste of Vengeance (1968)
- The Sailor with Golden Fists (1968)
- Cry Chicago (1969)
- Have a Good Funeral, My Friend... Sartana Will Pay (1970)
- The Man Who Wanted to Kill Himself (1970)
- Veinte pasos para la muerte (1970)
- Sartana Kills Them All (1970)
- My Horse, My Gun, Your Widow (1972)
- God in Heaven... Arizona on Earth (1972)
- They Believed He Was No Saint (1972)
- The King is the Best Mayor (1974)
- Death's Newlyweds (1975)
- Father Cami's Wedding (1979)

== Bibliography ==
- Cowie, Peter; Elley, Derek (1977). World Filmography: 1967. Fairleigh Dickinson Univ Press. p. 688. ISBN 9780498015656.
- Weisser, Thomas (22 August 2005). Spaghetti Westerns--the Good, the Bad and the Violent: A Comprehensive, Illustrated Filmography of 558 Eurowesterns and Their Personnel, 1961-1977. McFarland Publishing. p. 498. ISBN 9780786424429.
