= Gentleman Killer =

1967 film

- Directed by: Giorgio Stegani
- Written by: Giorgio Stegani; Jaime Jesús Balcázar
- Starring: Anthony Steffen; Eduardo Fajardo; Silvia Solar
- Cinematography: Francisco Marín
- Edited by: Teresa Alcocer; Graziella Zita
- Music by: Bruno Nicolai
- Release date: 1967

Gentleman Killer (Spanish: Gentleman Jo, Italian: Gentleman Jo... uccidi), also known as Shamango, is a 1967 spaghetti Western film co-written and directed by Giorgio Stegani under the pseudonym George Finley.

== Cast ==
- Anthony Steffen as 'Gentleman' Jo Reeves
- Eduardo Fajardo as Colonel Ferreras
- Silvia Solar as Vicky
- Anna Orso as Ruth Morrison
- Mariano Vidal Molina as Captain Clay Reeves
- Joaquín Blanco as Sam
- Benito Stefanelli as Larry
- Frank Oliveras as Morrison
- Antonio Iranzo as Bruce
- Ángel Lombarte as Mexican Official
- Renato Baldini
- Víctor Israel
- Sal Borgese

== Production ==
The film is a Spanish-Italian co-production by Corona Film and Dorica. It was shot between Esplugues de Llobregat and Fraga. Ennio Morricone served as music supervisor.

== Reception ==
A contemporary Corriere della Sera review described the film as conventional, as it "goes through all the obligatory stages of the Italian western, without any truly original ideas". Thomas Weisser noted that Gentleman Jo is "the kind of role Anthony Steffen was born to play; he doesn't have to say much, he just squints and shoots".
