= Custer of the West =

1967 film by Robert Siodmak

- Theatrical release poster by Frank McCarthy
- Directed by: Robert Siodmak
- Written by: Bernard Gordon; Julian Zimet
- Produced by: Philip Yordan
- Starring: Robert Shaw; Jeffrey Hunter; Ty Hardin; Mary Ure
- Cinematography: Cecilio Paniagua
- Edited by: Peter Parasheles; Maurice Rootes
- Music by: Bernardo Segall
- Production company: Security Pictures
- Distributed by: Cinerama Releasing Corporation
- Release date: November 9, 1967 (London)
- Running time: 141 minutes
- Country: United States
- Language: English
- Budget: $4 million
- Box office: $400,000 (US/Canada rentals)

Custer of the West is a 1967 American epic Western film directed by Robert Siodmak that presents a highly fictionalized version of the life and death of George Armstrong Custer, starring Robert Shaw as Custer, Robert Ryan, Ty Hardin, Jeffrey Hunter, and Mary Ure. It is the first film production from Cinerama Releasing Corporation. The film was shot entirely in Spain.

== Plot ==
With no better offers to be had, famous American Civil War upstart officer George Armstrong Custer takes over the Western Cavalry maintaining the peace in the Dakotas. He soon learns that the U.S. treaties are a sham, that Indian lands are being stolen and every excuse for driving them off their hunting grounds is being encouraged. With his wife Elizabeth, Custer goes in and out of favor in Washington while failing to keep wildcatting miners like his own deserting Sergeant Mulligan from running off to prospect for gold in Indian country. After trying to humble the prideful Indian warrior Dull Knife Custer leads the 7th Cavalry into defeat.

== Cast ==
- Robert Shaw as General George Armstrong Custer
- Mary Ure as Elizabeth Custer
- Ty Hardin as Major Marcus Reno
- Jeffrey Hunter as Captain Frederick Benteen
- Lawrence Tierney as General Philip Sheridan
- Marc Lawrence as the gold miner
- Kieron Moore as Chief Dull Knife
- Charles Stalmaker as Lt. Howells
- Jack Gaskins as Sgt. Gaskins
- Robert Hall as Sgt. Buckley
- Robert Ryan as Sgt. Mulligan
- John Clark as the Fort surgeon
- Barta Barri as The Grand Duke Alexis

== Production ==
In the mid-1960s, 20th Century-Fox announced plans to produce a film about Custer, called The Day Custer Fell. It had been developed by producer David Weisbat and was to be written by Wendell Mayes. Fred Zinnemann was to direct, with Robert Shaw among the actors considered to play the title role. Mayes recalled, "One of the things that was going to be marvelous in it was: the battle occurred on June 25th, 1876 ... the first part of the film would be fairly standard-size film, but on that day, in the middle of the film, the screen would begin to open until you're in Cinemascope for the rest of the picture." The project was cancelled on the grounds of cost.

Producer Philip Yordan decided to develop his own Custer film, and hired Bernard Gordon and Julian Zimet to write a script. According to Zimet, "The original brief was to turn out a typical Western sainted hero martyr script, which Gordon and I duly delivered. But Robert Shaw figured he would make it over to suit himself. Which he did. He turned Custer into a sadist of Shakespearean depth."

According to Bernard Gordon, "Production stumbled along on Custer as Julian and I tried to give the Indians a fair shake. Robert Shaw was helpful. A bright man and a fine writer, he approved of our point of view of that the Indians were victims right to the end. He even wrote one speech for Custer… that made this point sharply."

Yordan said he needed a known star (Shaw) and director (Siodmak) to raise the funds to produce the film.

Zimet later elaborated:

Shaw took care of the battle scenes himself. Siodmak preferred directing ballroom scenes, which he had done so often in his long career they required no invention. What he didn't anticipate, as he choreographed fifty couples, was that the actor—whose intervention was designed to give coherence to the scene—would go crazy, punch him in the chops, and walk off the set. I was already working on another project, but Yordan insisted that I write some lines for a minor actor, which would account for the miscreant's absence. This would allow the ballroom scene to continue, save having to locate the crazy or drunk actor, and save having to reshoot. While Siodmak kept the dancers in motion, I rehearsed the new actor in his role, and tailors stitched together a bespoke uniform. Within minutes he burst upon the scene, apologised on behalf of the government minister for his absence—due to a crisis in Washington—and announced an impending honour for Custer. It was a weak solution, but it saved a lot of money. That's show business for you.

The film was originally known as Custer's West. It was one of two big screen epics made by Security Pictures (a company of Louis Dolivet and Philip Yordan) in the Cinerama process, the other being Krakatoa, East of Java. Security borrowed $6 million from the First National Bank to make the films in collaboration with Pacific Theatres. Pacific and Security Pictures gave distribution rights to Cinerama. Cinerama bought out most of the rights of Pacific and Security Pictures, then sold 50% of the film to ABC Films.

Most of the film was shot within 30 miles (48 km) of Madrid, except for the Battle of Little Big Horn, which was filmed in Almería near Costa del Sol.

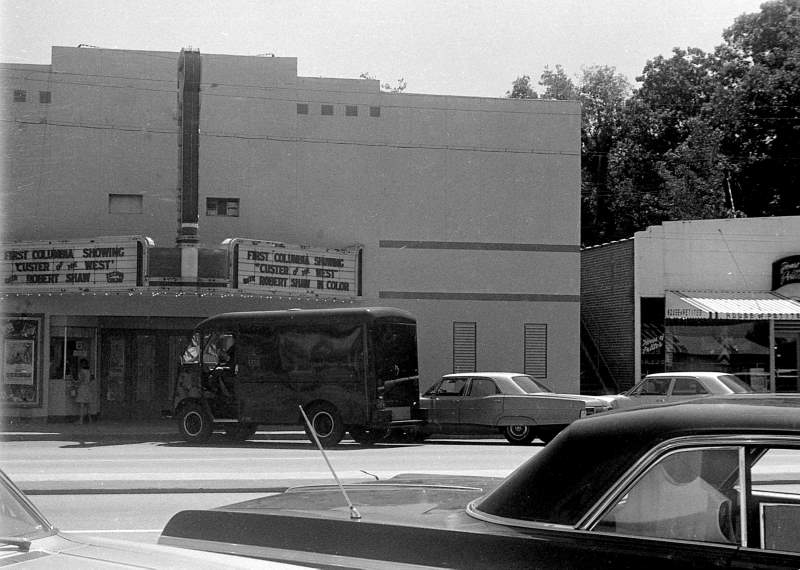
A South Carolina theater showing the film in 1968

== Reception ==
The film met with a largely negative reaction from critics. At Rotten Tomatoes, the film received only a 25% "rotten" rating. It holds average rating of 4.1/10. Many were unimpressed by the attempt to shoehorn two different viewpoints into the same film – the mistreatment of the native Americans by American troops, and the portrayal of Custer as an American hero who was not to blame for the disaster. The general inaccuracies of the film were also questioned, particularly the portrayal of the Battle of the Little Bighorn. The film returned theatrical rentals of only $400,000 in the United States and Canada.

== Home media ==
Custer of the West was released on VHS by Anchor Bay Entertainment on July 14, 1998, and on DVD by MGM Home Entertainment on May 25, 2004, as a Region 1 widescreen DVD.

== See also ==
- List of American films of 1967
- List of American films of 1966
