= God in Heaven... Arizona on Earth =

1972 film

- Film poster
- Spanish: Una bala marcada
- Directed by: Juan Bosch
- Screenplay by: Juan Bosch
- Story by: Juan Bosch; F. Daniel Ortusol; Fabio Piccioni
- Produced by: Ricardo Sanz
- Starring: Peter Lee Lawrence; Frank Braña; Maria Pia Conte; Roberto Camardiel; Luis Induni; Juan Torres
- Cinematography: Giancarlo Ferrando
- Edited by: Luis Puigvert
- Music by: Bruno Nicolai
- Production companies: Astro C.C.; Lea Film
- Distributed by: Aitor Films; Interfilm; Sunrise Tapes
- Release date: 26 June 1972 (Spain)
- Running time: 87 min
- Countries: Spain; Italy
- Languages: Spanish; Italian

God in Heaven... Arizona on Earth (Spanish: Una bala marcada, Italian: Dio in cielo... Arizona in terra) is a 1972 Spanish-Italian western film directed by Juan Bosch and starred by Peter Lee Lawrence, Frank Braña, Maria Pia Conte and Roberto Camardiel.

== Cast ==
- Peter Lee Lawrence as Garringo/Arizona
- Maria Pia Conte as Catherine
- Roberto Camardiel as Duffy
- Dada Gallotti as Nora Stevens
- Carlo Gaddi as Towers
- Frank Braña as Austin Styles
- Luis Induni as Sheriff Cassidy
- José Castillo Escalona as Warre, a rancher
- Gustavo Re as a dentist
- Indio González as Bill
- Juan Torres as Jack
- Esteban Dalmases as a rancher
- Juan Fairen as a henchman in Saloon
- Fanny Grey as a Saloon Girl
- Ricardo Moyán as Pistolero de Styles
- Isidro Novellas as a rancher
- José Palomo as Antonio
- Franco Pesce as Sam, the shopkeeper
- Riccardo Petrazzi as Willie the Lion

== Bibliography ==
- Núñez Marqués, Anselmo (2006). Western a la europea...: un plato que se sirve frío (in Spanish). Entrelineas Editores. p. 485. ISBN 9788498024326.
