= Maribel Martín (actress) =

Spanish actress (born 1954)

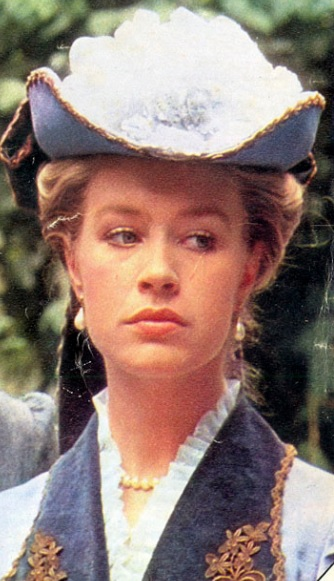
- Born: María Isabel Martín Martínez; 1 November 1954 (age 71); Madrid, Spain
- Occupation: Actor
- Years active: 1961 – present

María Isabel Martín Martínez (1 November 1954 in Madrid, Spain), better known as Maribel Martín, is a Spanish actress.

== Career ==
She made her acting debut at age seven in the film Tres de la Cruz Roja (1961), a film directed by Fernando Palacios. She had a career as a child actress in films like: La gran familia (1962), by Fernando Palacios and El Camino (1963) directed by Ana Mariscal. At the end of the 1960s, she took more important roles in films like: The House That Screamed (1969) by Narciso Ibáñez Serrador and La Cera Virgen (1971) directed by Jose Maria Forque. She had her first starring role in The Blood Spattered Bride under the direction of Vicente Aranda. During the 1970s she concentrated her work in the theater and television. Among her films of this period are: Los Viajes Escolares (1973) directed by Jaime Chávarri; La Espada Negra (1976) film directed by Francisco Rovira Beleta. Campana del Infierno (1973) by Claudio Guerin.

After her starring role in Últimas tardes con Teresa (1983) directed by Gonzalo Herralde, she created the production company Ganesh Films with actor Julian Mateos and from then on she has taken roles in some of their production: The Holy Innocents (1984), by Mario Camus and Moon Child (1989), a film directed by Agusti Villaronga. Her most recent film is Engendro (2005) under the direction of Luis Cabeza.

== Selected filmography ==
- La gran familia (1962)
- The House That Screamed (1969)
- The Blood Spattered Bride (1972)
- The Bell from Hell (1973)
- The Lonely Woman (1973)
- The Great House (1975)
- Forget the Drums (1975)
- Whiskey and Ghosts (1976)
- Fortunata y Jacinta (1980)
- Últimas tardes con Teresa (1983)
- The Holy Innocents (1984)
- Moon Child (1989)
