= Joan Bosch =

Spanish film director and screenwriter (1925–2015)

- Born: Joan Bosch Palau; 31 May 1925; Valls, Tarragona
- Died: 17 November 2015 (aged 90)
- Occupation(s): Film director, screenwriter
- Years active: 1957-1983
- Spouse: Nativitat Sans Solé

Joan Bosch Palau (31 May 1925 – 17 November 2015) was a Spanish film director and screenwriter.

In 1946 he travelled to Morocco to work as military at the same time he was directing Las aventuras del capitán Guido (1946). He returned to Madrid and he worked as screenwriter with Antonio del Amo.

Bosch died on 18 November 2015, at the age of 90.

== Filmography ==
=== Director ===
- Especulació del sól (1982)
- Un rolls para Hipólito (1982)
- Caray con el divorcio (1982)
- Los locos vecinos del 2º (1980)
- Cuarenta años sin sexo (1982)
- La ciudad maldita (1978)
- Es pecado... pero me gusta (1978)
- La dudosa virilidad de Cristóbal (1977)
- Mauricio, mon amour (1976)
- Exorcismo (1975)
- The Killer Wore Gloves (1974)
- Dallas (1974)
- The Killer with a Thousand Eyes (1973)
- They Believed He Was No Saint (1972)
- My Horse, My Gun, Your Widow (1972)
- God in Heaven... Arizona on Earth (1972)
- And the Crows Will Dig Your Grave (1971)
- Dig Your Grave Friend... Sabata's Coming (1971)
- Investigación criminal (1970)
- Stagecoach of the Condemned (1970)
- Chico, chica, ¡boom! (1969)
- La viudita ye-yé (1968)
- El terrible de Chicago (1967)
- El castigador (1965)
- Sol de verano (1963)
- Bahía de Palma (1962)
- El último verano (1962)
- Regresa un desconocido (1961)
- A sangre fría (1959)
- Huellas del destino (1957)
- Sendas marcadas (1957)

=== Screenwriter ===
- El recomendado (1985)
- Secta siniestra (1982)
- Un tesoro en el cielo (1957)
- Veraneo en España (1956)
- Un heredero en apuros (1956)
- El cerco (1955)
- El fugitivo de Amberes (1955)
- Día tras día (1951)
