= Mario Camus =

Spanish film director and screenwriter (1935–2021)

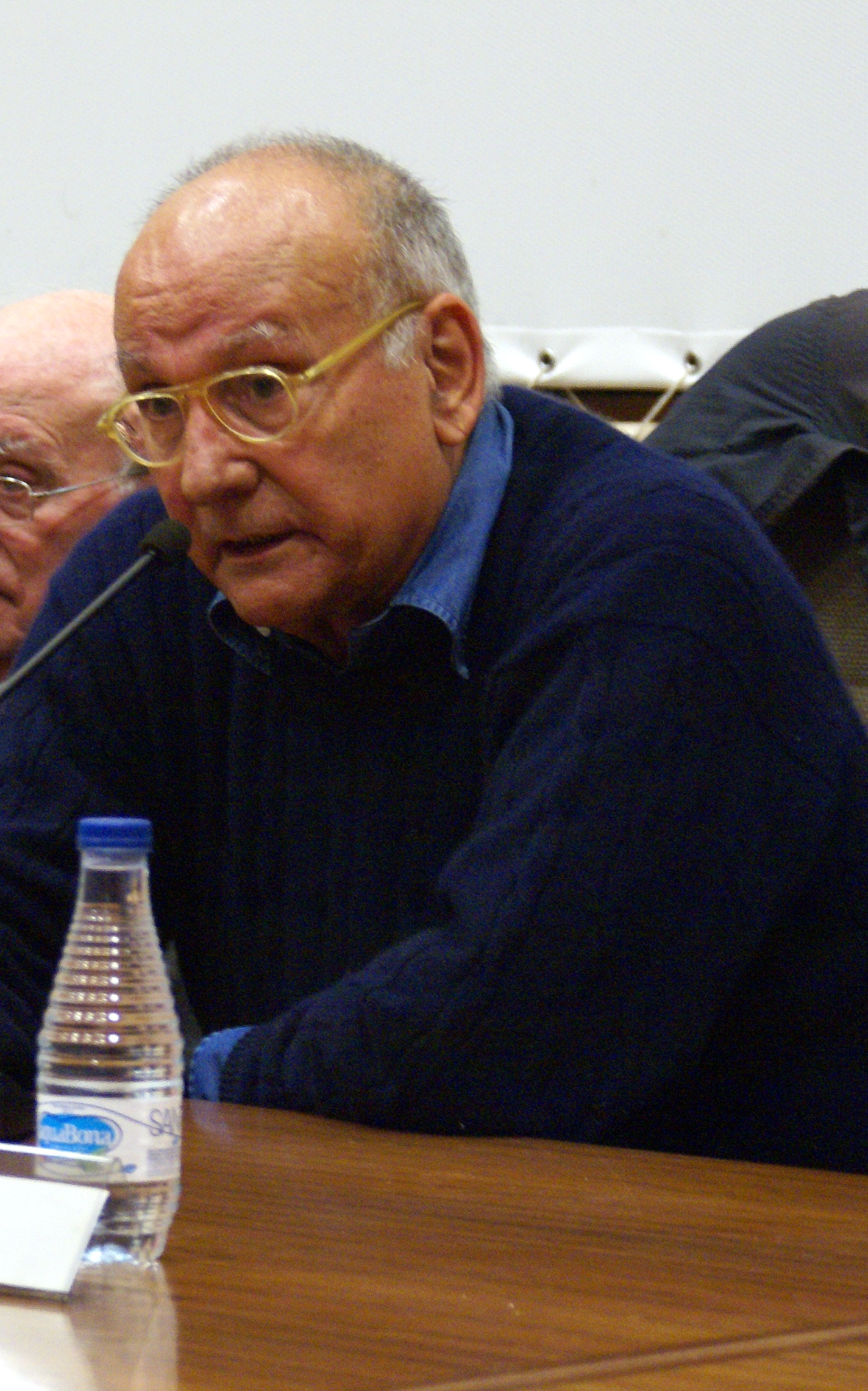
- Camus in 2011
- Born: Mario Camus García; 20 April 1935; Santander, Spain
- Died: 18 September 2021 (aged 86); Santander, Spain
- Occupations: Screenwriter; Film director
- Years active: 1962–2021

Mario Camus García (20 April 1935 – 18 September 2021) was a Spanish film director and screenwriter. He won the Golden Bear at the 33rd Berlin International Film Festival with La colmena. His 1987 film The House of Bernarda Alba was screened in the Un Certain Regard section at the 1987 Cannes Film Festival and in the main competition at the 15th Moscow International Film Festival. His 1993 film Shadows in a Conflict was entered into the 18th Moscow International Film Festival.

== Filmography ==
=== Film director ===
- 1962 – El Borracho
- 1963 – La Suerte
- 1963 – Los Farsantes
- 1964 – Young Sánchez
- 1965 – La visita que no tocó el timbre
- 1965 – Muere una mujer
- 1966 – With the East Wind
- 1966 – Cuando tú no estás
- 1967 – Soledad
- 1967 – Al ponerse el sol
- 1968 – Cuentos y leyendas (TVE) (series)
- 1968 – Volver a vivir
- 1968 – Let Them Talk
- 1969 – Esa mujer
- 1970 – The Wind's Fierce
- 1972 – Si las piedras hablaran (TVE) (series)
- 1973 – La leyenda del alcalde de Zalamea
- 1975 – Los Pájaros de Baden-Baden
- 1975 – La Joven casada
- 1976 and 1977 – Paisajes con figuras (TVE) (series)
- 1976 – Curro Jiménez (TVE) (series)
- 1978 – Los días del pasado
- 1980 – Fortunata y Jacinta (TVE) (miniserie)
- 1982 – La colmena
- 1983 – Los desastres de la guerra
- 1984 – The Holy Innocents
- 1985 – La vieja música
- 1987 – The House of Bernarda Alba
- 1987 – La Rusa
- 1990 – La forja de un rebelde (TVE) miniserie
- 1990 – La femme et le pantin
- 1992 – Después del sueño
- 1993 – Shadows in a Conflict
- 1994 – Amor propio
- 1996 – Adosados
- 1997 – El color de las nubes
- 1998 – La Vuelta de El Coyote
- 1999 – La ciudad de los prodigios
- 2002 – La playa de los galgos
- 2007 – El prado de las estrellas

=== Screenwriter ===
- 1962 – The Delinquents
- 1962 – El Borracho
- 1963 – La Suerte
- 1963 – Los farsantes
- 1964 – Young Sánchez
- 1964 – Weeping for a Bandit
- 1965 – La visita que no tocó el timbre
- 1965 – El que enseña
- 1965 – Muere una mujer
- 1966 – With the East Wind
- 1966 – Cuando tú no estás
- 1967 – Al ponerse el sol
- 1968 – Volver a vivir
- 1970 – The Wind's Fierce
- 1972 – Chicas de club
- 1975 – Los Pájaros de Baden-Baden
- 1975 – La Joven casada
- 1978 – Los días del pasado
- 1980 – Fortunata y Jacinta
- 1983 – Truhanes
- 1984 – The Holy Innocents
- 1985 – La vieja música
- 1985 – Luces de bohemia
- 1985 – Marbella, un golpe de cinco estrellas
- 1986 – Werther
- 1987 – The House of Bernarda Alba
- 1987 – La Rusa
- 1988 – Gallego
- 1991 – Beltenebros
- 1992 – Después del sueño
- 1993 – The Bird of Happiness
- 1993 – Shadows in a Conflict
- 1994 – Amor propio
- 1996 – Adosados
- 1996 – Más allá del jardín
- 1997 – El color de las nubes
- 1998 – La Vuelta de El Coyote
- 1999 – La ciudad de los prodigios
- 2002 – La playa de los galgos
- 2004 – Roma
- 2007 – El prado de las estrellas
