= Esteva =

Esteva is a surname. Notable people with the surname include:

- Alberto Esteva Salinas (born 1964), Mexican politician
- Antonio Baldellou-Esteva (born 1981), Spanish tennis coach and former player
- Gustavo Esteva (1936–2022), Mexican activist
- Jacinto Esteva Grewe (1936-1985), Spanish film director
- Jean-Pierre Esteva (1880–1951), French naval officer
- Joan Esteva (born 1973), Spanish soccer coach and former player
- Luis Andrés Esteva (born 1951), Mexican politician
- Manuel A. Esteva (1878–1936), Mexican diplomat
- Maurus Esteva Alsina (1933–2014), Spanish Cistercian abbot
- Santiago Esteva (born 1952), Spanish swimmer
