= 22nd Venice International Film Festival =

Italian film festival in 1961

- Festival poster
- Location: Venice, Italy
- Founded: 1932
- Awards: Golden Lion: Last Year at Marienbad
- Festival date: 20 August – 3 September 1961
- Website: Website

Venice Film Festival chronology
- 23rd 21st

The 22nd annual Venice International Film Festival was held from 20 August to 3 September 1961.

Italian film critic Filippo Sacchi was the Jury President for the main competition. The Golden Lion winner was Last Year at Marienbad directed by Alain Resnais.

== Jury ==
- Filippo Sacchi, Italian journalist and film critic - Jury President
- Lev Arnshtam, Soviet filmmaker
- Giulio Cesare Castello, Italian film critic
- Jean de Baroncelli, French film critic
- John Hubley, American filmmaker
- Gian Gaspare Napolitano, Italian journalist
- Leopoldo Torre Nilsson, Argentinian filmmaker

== Official Sections ==
The following films were selected to be screened:

=== Main Competition ===
English title	Original title	Director(s)	Production country
Bandits of Orgosolo	Banditi a Orgosolo	Vittorio De Seta	Italy
The Brigand	Il brigante	Renato Castellani	Italy
The Betrayer	Vanina Vanini	Roberto Rossellini	Italy
Bridge to the Sun		Etienne Périer	France, United States
The Day the Tree Blooms	Kde reky mají slunce	Václav Krska	Czechoslovakia
The Girl with the Golden Eyes	La fille aux yeux d'or	Jean-Gabriel Albicocco	France
The Last Judgment	Il giudizio universale	Vittorio De Sica	Italy
Last Year at Marienbad	L'Année dernière à Marienbad	Alain Resnais	France
Peace to Him Who Enters	Мир входящему	Aleksandr Alov	Soviet Union
Samson		Andrzej Wajda	Poland
Summer and Smoke		Peter Glenville	United States
Thou Shalt Not Kill	Tu ne tueras point	Claude Autant-Lara	France
Victim		Basil Dearden	United Kingdom
Yojimbo		Akira Kurosawa	Japan

=== Out of Competition ===
English title	Original title	Director(s)	Production country
Léon Morin, Priest	Léon Morin, prêtre	Jean-Pierre Melville	France

=== Informativa ===
English title	Original title	Director(s)	Production country
Accattone		Pier Paolo Pasolini	Italy
Angel Baby		Paul Wendkos	United States
Ánimas Trujano		Ismael Rodríguez	Mexico
Clear Skies	Чистое небо	Grigori Chukhrai	Soviet Union
Chronicle of a Summer	Chronique d'un été	Edgar Morin, Jean Rouch	France
The Connection		Shirley Clarke	United States
Dark Journey	Leviathan	Léonard Keigel	France
Days of Thrills and Laughter		Robert Youngson	United States
Education of Love	爱的教育	Robert Chung	Hong Kong
The Exiles		Kent Mackenzie	United States
A False Student	偽大学生	Yasuzo Masumura	Japan
Happiness of Us Alone	名もなく貧しく美しく	Zenzô Matsuyama	Japan
Kauf dir einen bunten Luftballon		Géza von Cziffra	West Germany, Austria
My Friend, Kolka!	Друг мой, Колька!	Aleksandr Mitta, Aleksei Saltykov	Soviet Union
Il Posto		Ermanno Olmi	Italy
The Promise	Συννέφιασε ο Παρνασσός	Vasilis Georgiadis	Greece
Square of Violence	Nasilje na trgu	Leonardo Bercovici	Yugoslavia
Night Tide		Curtis Harrington	United States
Of Stars and Men		John Hubley	United States
Prisioneros de una noche		David José Kohon	Argentina
Saturday Night and Sunday Morning		Karel Reisz	United Kingdom
A Song About the Gray Pigeon	Piesen o sivom holubovi	Stanislav Barabas	Czechoslovakia
Summer Skin	Piel de verano	Leopoldo Torre Nilsson	Argentina
Tiro al piccione		Giuliano Montaldo	Italy
Tonight a City Will Die	Dzis w nocy umrze miasto	Jan Rybkowski	Poland
Yanco		Servando González	Mexico

== Official Awards ==
- Golden Lion: Last Year at Marienbad by Alain Resnais
- Special Jury Prize: Peace to Him Who Enters by Aleksandr Alov
- Volpi Cup for Best Actor: Toshiro Mifune for Yojimbo
- Volpi Cup for Best Actress: Suzanne Flon for Thou Shalt Not Kill
- Best First Work: Banditi a Orgosolo by Vittorio De Seta

== Independent Awards ==
=== New Cinema Award ===
- Banditi a Orgosolo by Vittorio De Seta

=== San Giorgio Prize ===
- Banditi a Orgosolo by Vittorio De Seta

=== FIPRESCI Prize ===
- The Brigand by Renato Castellani

=== OCIC Award ===
- Il Posto by Ermanno Olmi

=== Pasinetti Award ===
- Peace to Him Who Enters by Aleksandr Alov
  - Parallel Sections: Il Posto by Ermanno Olmi

=== Italian Cinema Clubs Award ===
- Banditi a Orgosolo by Vittorio De Seta

=== Award of the City of Imola ===
- Il Posto by Ermanno Olmi

=== Award of the City of Venice ===
- Léon Morin, Priest by Jean-Pierre Melville
