= La Fille aux yeux d'or =

1835 novella by Honoré de Balzac

The Girl with the Golden Eyes
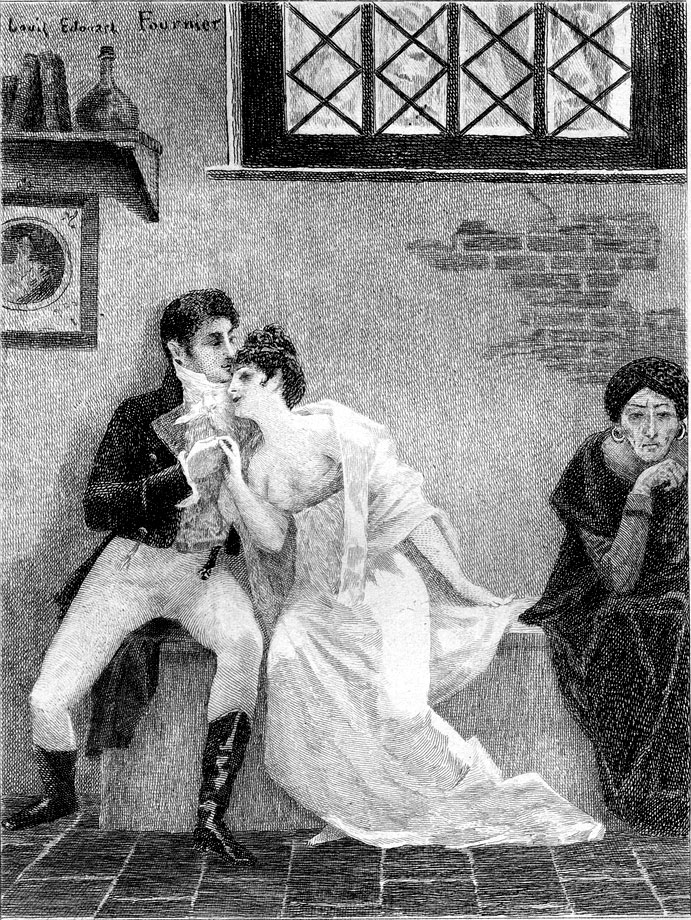
- Illustration from The Girl with the Golden Eyes (George Barrie & Son, 1897)
- Author: Honoré de Balzac
- Original title: La Fille aux yeux d'or
- Language: French
- Series: La Comédie humaine
- Publication date: 1835
- Publication place: Paris, France
- Preceded by: La Duchesse de Langeais
- Followed by: Le Bal de Sceaux

The Girl with the Golden Eyes (French: La Fille aux yeux d'or) is an 1835 novella by Honoré de Balzac. It is the third part of the Thirteen trilogy, which also includes the short stories Ferragus and La Duchesse de Langeais. It is also part of his novel sequence La Comédie humaine.

== Synopsis ==
The story follows the decadent heir Henri de Marsay, who becomes enamoured of the beautiful Paquita Valdès, and his plan to seduce her. He succeeds but becomes disillusioned when he discovers she is involved with another lover, and so he plots to murder her. When he arrives to kill her, he discovers that she is already dead by the hand of her lover, who turns out to be his half-sister. She declares that Paquita came from a land where women are no more than chattels, able to be bought and used in any way. In the last lines of the story, de Marsay tells a friend that the girl has died "de la poitrine", "from the chest," a response that could mean from tuberculosis (rampant in 19th century France) or from an affair of the heart, i.e. love.

== Film ==
In 1961, a film was released based on the novel starring Marie Laforêt, Paul Guers, Françoise Prévost, Françoise Dorléac, and Jacques Verlier. It was adapted by Philippe Dumarçay, screenwritten by Pierre Pelegri, and directed by Jean-Gabriel Albicocco.

== See also ==
- Coppélia, a ballet
