= Danyel Gérard discography =

Discography

- Studio albums: 11
- Compilation albums: 19
- Singles: 58

This is the discography of French singer Danyel Gérard.

== Albums ==
=== Studio albums ===
| Title | Album details | Peak chart positions | |
| Title | Album details | FRA | GER |
|---|---|---|---|
| Danyel Gérard | Released: 1964; Label: Disc'Az; Formats: LP | — | — |
| Atmosphère | Released: 1971; Label: CBS; Formats: LP, MC | — | 44 |
| Atmosphère 2 | Released: 1972; Label: CBS; Formats: LP | — | — |
| Les années folles de 1960 à 1965 | Released: 1974; Label: Gypsy/Sonopresse; Formats: LP, MC; Re-recordings | — | — |
| Constatations | Released: 1975; Label: Gypsy/Sonopresse; Formats: LP | 6 | — |
| Rien qu'une vie….. | Released: 1976; Label: Gypsy/Sonopresse; Formats: LP | — | — |
| Gone with the Wind | Released: 1977; Label: Gypsy/Sonopresse; Formats: LP | — | — |
| Mélodie mélodies | Released: 1978; Label: Gypsy/Sonopresse; Formats: LP | — | — |
| Regard | Released: 1982; Label: Gypsy; Formats: LP | — | — |
| Nostalgia... in America | Released: 1983; Label: Gypsy; Formats: LP | — | — |
| Good or Bad… | Released: 1991; Label: Sir Music; Formats: CD, MC | — | — |
"—" denotes releases that did not chart or were not released in that territory.

=== Compilation albums ===
| Title | Album details | Peak chart positions |
| Title | Album details | GER |
|---|---|---|
| Starportrait: Neue Lieder in deutscher Sprache | Released: February 1972; Label: CBS; Formats: LP, MC; German-language album; Germany and Netherlands-only release | 42 |
| Danyel Gerard | Released: April 1972; Label: MGM; Formats: LP; English-language album; US, Canada and the Netherlands-only release | — |
| Memphis Tennessee, Un grand amour... | Released: 1978; Label: Music for Pleasure; Formats: LP | — |
| Les temps changent | Released: 1979; Label: Gypsy; Formats: LP | — |
| Petit Gonzales | Released: 1981; Label: Polydor; Formats: LP | — |
| Les plus grands succès de Danyel Gérard | Released: September 1989; Label: Carrere; Formats: CD, LP | — |
| Danyel Gérard | Released: June 1990; Label: PolyGram; Formats: CD | — |
| Surprise partie | Released: October 1991; Label: Disc'Az; Formats: CD | — |
| Génération inoubliable... | Released: September 1993; Label: WH; Formats: CD | — |
| Danyel Gérard | Released: 1996; Label: Magic; Formats: 2xCD | — |
| Route 61–96 | Released: 25 November 1996; Label: Une Musique; Formats: CD | — |
| Danyel Gérard | Released: January 2002; Label: Polydor; Formats: 2xCD | — |
| Portrait 1958–1970 | Released: April 2008; Label: Magic; Formats: 2xCD | — |
| 1963 | Released: July 2009; Label: Magic; Formats: CD; With les Champions | — |
| Documents Sixties Rares – 1962 | Released: 8 April 2010; Label: Magic; Formats: CD | — |
| 1958–1959 | Released: 13 May 2010; Label: Magic; Formats: CD | — |
| 1961–1962 | Released: 24 June 2010; Label: Magic; Formats: CD | — |
| Salut les copains | Released: 27 April 2015; Label: Europe 1/Barclay; Formats: 2xCD, digital download | — |
"—" denotes releases that did not chart or were not released in that territory.

== Singles ==
| Name | Year | Peak chart positions | | | | | | | | | | | Album |
| Name | Year | FRA | AUS | AUT | BE (WA) | GER | NL | NZ | QUE | SPA | UK | US | Album |
|---|---|---|---|---|---|---|---|---|---|---|---|---|---|
| "Tais toi" | 1959 | — | — | — | — | — | — | — | — | — | — | — | Non-album singles |
| "Tout l'amour" (Canada-only release) | 1959 | — | — | — | — | — | — | — | 11 | — | — | — | Non-album singles |
| "Oh pauvre amour" | 1959 | — | — | — | — | — | — | — | — | — | — | — | Non-album singles |
| "Oh! Marie line" | 1961 | 79 | — | — | — | — | — | — | — | — | — | — | Non-album singles |
| "La leçon de twist" (EP) | 1962 | 2 | — | — | 4 | — | — | — | — | — | — | — | Non-album singles |
| "Petit Gonzales" (with les Danger's) | 1962 | 12 | — | — | 3 | — | — | — | — | — | — | — | Non-album singles |
| "Ça n'finira jamais" | 1962 | — | — | — | — | — | — | — | — | — | — | — | Non-album singles |
| "L'incendie" (with les Danger's) | 1962 | 96 | — | — | — | — | — | — | — | — | — | — | Non-album singles |
| "Je" (with les Champions) | 1963 | 7 | — | — | 6 | — | — | — | 6 | — | — | — | Non-album singles |
| "Toujours cette guitare" (with les Champions) / | 1963 | 32 | — | — | 6 | — | — | — | — | — | — | — | Non-album singles |
| "Elle est trop loin" (with les Champions) | 1963 | 9 | — | — | 6 | — | — | — | — | — | — | — | Non-album singles |
| "Sugar Shake" (with les Champions) | 1963 | 41 | — | — | 18 | — | — | — | — | — | — | — | Non-album singles |
| "America" (with les Champions) | 1963 | 32 | — | — | 18 | — | — | — | — | — | — | — | Non-album singles |
| "Memphis Tennessee" | 1964 | 10 | — | — | 18 | — | — | — | — | — | — | — | Danyel Gérard |
| "L'heure est arrivée" | 1964 | — | — | — | — | — | — | — | — | — | — | — | Non-album single |
| "D'accord d'accord" | 1964 | 20 | — | — | 13 | — | — | — | — | — | — | — | Danyel Gérard |
| "Il pleut dans ma maison" | 1964 | 57 | — | — | 13 | — | — | — | — | — | — | — | Danyel Gérard |
| "Pourquoi pas" | 1964 | 45 | — | — | 22 | — | — | — | — | — | — | — | Danyel Gérard |
| "Le petit bandit de Juarez" (with les Champions; Canada-only release) | 1964 | — | — | — | — | — | — | — | 12 | — | — | — | Non-album singles |
| "Se (Je)" | 1964 | — | — | — | — | — | — | — | — | — | — | — | Non-album singles |
| "Senza l'amour" | 1964 | — | — | — | — | — | — | — | — | — | — | — | Non-album singles |
| "Cherchons du travail" | 1965 | 17 | — | — | — | — | — | — | — | — | — | — | Danyel Gérard |
| "Mia cara" (Italy-only release) | 1965 | — | — | — | — | — | — | — | — | — | — | — | Non-album singles |
| "Je n'aime pas quand..." | 1966 | — | — | — | — | — | — | — | — | — | — | — | Non-album singles |
| "Tu me souris tu ne dis rien" | 1966 | 62 | — | — | — | — | — | — | — | — | — | — | Non-album singles |
| "Ca fait mal" | 1967 | — | — | — | — | — | — | — | — | — | — | — | Non-album singles |
| "Helas trois fois helas" | 1969 | — | — | — | — | — | — | — | — | — | — | — | Non-album singles |
| "Même un clown" | 1970 | 60 | — | — | — | — | — | — | — | — | — | — | Atmosphère |
| "Avec ces deux mains là" | 1970 | — | — | — | — | — | — | — | — | — | — | — | Atmosphère |
| "Butterfly" | 1971 | — | 10 | 1 | 2 | 1 | 2 | 7 | 9 | 2 | 11 | 78 | Atmosphère |
| "Le petit bandit" (Germany and Austria-only release) | 1971 | — | — | 10 | — | — | — | — | — | — | — | — | Non-album single |
| "D'Amérique au coeur du Japon" | 1971 | 61 | — | — | — | — | — | — | — | — | — | — | Atmosphère 2 |
| "Harlekin" | 1972 | — | — | — | — | 12 | — | — | — | — | — | — | Starportrait |
| "Caroline" | 1972 | — | — | — | — | — | — | — | — | — | — | — | Atmosphère 2 |
| "Low Lay Low" | 1972 | — | — | — | — | — | — | — | — | — | — | — | Danyel Gerard |
| "Meine Stadt" (Germany-only release) | 1972 | — | — | — | — | 26 | — | — | — | — | — | — | Starportrait |
| "Le gypsy" | 1973 | 24 | — | — | — | — | — | — | — | — | — | — | Constatations |
| "Isabella" | 1973 | — | — | — | — | 40 | — | — | — | 28 | — | — | Non-album singles |
| "Ti-laï-laï-li (L'arménien)" | 1973 | 50 | — | — | 42 | 37 | — | — | 18 | — | — | — | Non-album singles |
| "Oh Mama" | 1974 | — | — | — | — | — | — | — | — | — | — | — | Non-album singles |
| "Ma Carmagnole" | 1974 | — | — | — | — | — | — | — | — | — | — | — | Non-album singles |
| "Un grand amour" | 1975 | 16 | — | — | 21 | — | — | — | — | — | — | — | Constatations |
| "Passionnément"/"En ce temps la... Monsieur !" | 1975 | 61 | — | — | 50 | — | — | — | — | — | — | — | Rien qu'une vie... |
| "Ou serons-nous Martin" | 1976 | — | — | — | — | — | — | — | — | — | — | — | Rien qu'une vie... |
| "Elle" | 1976 | — | — | — | — | — | — | — | — | — | — | — | Non-album single |
| "Les temps changent" | 1977 | 9 | — | — | 21 | — | — | — | — | — | — | — | Gone with the Wind |
| "Gone with the Wind" | 1977 | — | — | — | — | — | — | — | — | — | — | — | Gone with the Wind |
| "Mañaña, Mañaña, Senor" (Germany-only release) | 1977 | — | — | — | — | — | — | — | — | — | — | — | Non-album single |
| "Mélodie, mélodie" | 1978 | 4 | — | — | — | — | — | — | — | — | — | — | Mélodie mélodies |
| "Héloïse" | 1978 | 26 | — | — | — | — | — | — | — | — | — | — | Mélodie mélodies |
| "Marylou" | 1979 | 6 | — | — | — | — | — | — | — | — | — | — | Non-album singles |
| "Pour vivre avec toi" | 1980 | 65 | — | — | — | — | — | — | — | — | — | — | Non-album singles |
| "Meloman" | 1981 | — | — | — | — | — | — | — | — | — | — | — | Non-album singles |
| "Tu t'es planté" | 1982 | 80 | — | — | — | — | — | — | — | — | — | — | Regard |
| "Greyhound Transamerica" | 1982 | — | — | — | — | — | — | — | — | — | — | — | Regard |
| "Chacun sa musique" | 1982 | — | — | — | — | — | — | — | — | — | — | — | Regard |
| "Sulirane" | 1983 | 37 | — | — | — | — | — | — | — | — | — | — | Nostalgia... in America |
| "Good or Bad, on s'en sortira" | 1992 | — | — | — | — | — | — | — | — | — | — | — | Good or Bad |
"—" denotes releases that did not chart or were not released in that territory.
