= UK Compilation Chart =

Record chart

The UK Compilation Chart is a record chart based on sales of multi artist compilation albums in the United Kingdom. It is compiled weekly by the Official Charts Company (OCC), and each week's Top 40 is published online on the official websites of the OCC (Top 100), BBC Radio 1 and MTV, and in the magazines Music Week (Top 20) and UKChartsPlus (Top 50).

Though only accredited to compiling multi-artist compilation albums, the chart compiles all full-length various artist releases, not only when it involves a traditional compilation album of old recordings, but even when it's an original studio album by "various artists", whereby all the recordings are new. This is the case for example in motion picture soundtrack albums.

== History ==
TV-advertised hits compilations had been established in the United Kingdom since K-Tel's 20 Dynamic Hits in 1972, but following the December 1983 release of the first album in the Now That's What I Call Music series, compilation albums featuring various artists reached a new level of popularity in the UK during the mid to late 1980s. As a result of their dominance over the UK Albums Chart, releases from various artists were excluded from the main UK album chart from 14 January 1989. Instead, they were compiled in the newly created UK Compilation Chart. This meant albums such as Now That's What I Call Music! 13 and The Hits Album 9, which had charted into the main Albums chart, had to be transferred into the compilations chart as they were still selling strong.

In 2020, the Official Charts company amended the rules to categorise motion picture cast recordings and stage show albums as compilations alongside various artist film and television soundtracks. This was after The Greatest Showman album had spent 28 weeks at number one on the main albums chart, between 18 January 2018 and 31 January 2019, with the album still being Top 20 when the album was excluded from the Top 75 on week ending 9 January 2020. In addition to The Greatest Showman, the collaborative album JackBoys by Travis Scott and rappers on his record label was also deemed to be a compilation and not an artist album, with the cast recordings of A Star Is Born and Cats also being transferred under the new rules, with Cats having charted for one week at number 44 on the main artist albums chart before being excluded.

== See also ==
- List of best-selling compilation albums by year in the United Kingdom
- List of UK Compilation Chart number ones
