= Dark Journey =

Dark Journey may refer to:

- Dark Journey (1937 film), a British spy film
- Dark Journey (1961 film), a French drama
- Dark Journey (novel), a Star Wars novel
- "Dark Journey" (comics), a story in Star Wars Tales 17
- Dark Journey (wrestling), ring name of professional wrestler and professional wrestling valet Linda Newton
- A Dark Journey, a novel in the Tenabran Trilogy by Dave Luckett
