= Les Vendanges de l'amour =

Single by Marie Laforêt
- Language: French
- Released: 1963
- Label: Disques Festival
- Songwriter(s): Danyel Gérard, Michel Jourdan

Music video
- "Les Vendanges de l'amour" (audio only) on YouTube

"Les Vendanges de l'amour" is a song by French singer Marie Laforêt. It initially appeared in 1963 on her EP titled Marie Laforêt (also called Les Vendanges de l'amour and Marie Laforêt vol. 1).

== Composition ==
The song was written by Danyel Gérard and Michel Jourdan.

== Track listings ==
7-inch EP Marie Laforêt (1963, Festival FX 45 1331, France)

A1. "Les Vendanges de l'amour" (2:37)
A2. "Tu fais semblant" (2:29)
B1. "Mary Ann" (3:01)
B2. "Les Jeunes Filles" (2:19)

7-inch single (1963, Disques Festival FX 109, Italy)

1. "La vendemmia dell'amore" ("Les vendanges de l'amour")
2. "Che male c'è" ("Tu fais semblant")

7-inch EP Les Vendanges de l'amour / Viens sur la montagne / Le Lit de Lola / Katy cruelle (Musidisc VI 330, France)

A1. "Les Vendanges de l'amour" (2:25)
A2. "Le Lit de Lola" (2:43)
B1. "Viens sur la montagne" (Tell It on the Mountain) (2:20)
B2. "Katy cruelle"

== Charts ==
"Les Vendanges de l'amour"

Chart (1963)	Peak position
Belgium (Ultratop 50 Wallonia)	9
