= Gönül Yazar =

Turkish singer and actress (born 1936)

- Born: Mürşide Gönül Özyenginer; 12 August 1936 (age 89); İzmir, Turkey
- Genres: Classical Turkish music
- Occupations: Singer and actress
- Instruments: Vocals
- Years active: 1954–2003

Gönül Yazar (born Mürşide Gönül Özyenginer; 12 August 1936) is a Turkish singer and actress.

In 1968 Yazar performed Marie Laforêt's song, "Mon amour, mon ami", in Turkish version as "Çapkın Kız".

== Albums ==
- Gönül Yazar - Halime (1968) (Şençalar Plak)
- Dertleri Zevk Edindim (1970/ 1977) (Arya Plak/ Yavuz Plak)
- Gönül Yazar - Nisan Yağmuru (1970) (Televizyon Plak)
- Gönül Yazar - O Ağacın Altı (1972) (Kervan Plak)
- Artık Bu Solan Bahçede (1973) (Atlas Plak)
- Çakıl Galası'nda (1974) (İstanbul Plak)
- Gönül Yazar - Ağlar Gezerim (1974) (Yavuz Plak)
- Gönül Yazar - Tadı Yok Sensiz Geçen Günlerimin (1975) (Yavuz Plak)
- Gönül Yazar/Süper Midi Play - Sen de Mevsimler Gibisin (1975) (Yavuz Plak)
- Aldırma Gönül (1978) (Elenor Plak)
- Taş Bebek (1979) (Elenor Plak)
- İşte Benim Dünyam (1982) (Elenor Plak)
- Gönül Defterim (1985) (Elenor Plak)
- Ne Yazar (19**) (Harika/MC)
- Gönül'den Gönüllere (1989) (Emre Plak)
- Sevmek İstiyorum (1993) (Elenor Plak)
- Forever (2010) (Ossi Müzik)

=== Compilation albums ===
- Gönül Yazar'dan Seçmeler (1974) (Yavuz Plak)
- En İyileriyle Gönül Yazar (2006) (Ossi Müzik)

== Movies ==
- Taş Bebek, (1960)
- Bir Bahar Akşamı, (1961)
- Bir Gecelik Gelin, (1962)
- Ateşli Kan, (1962)
- Kelepçeli Aşk, (1963)
- Var mı Bana Yan Bakan, (1964)
- Şu Kızların Elinden, (1964)
- Sahte Sevgili, (1964)
- Köye Giden Gelin, (1964)
- Cımbız Ali, (1964)
- Yalancının Mumu, (1965)
- Kocamın Nişanlısı, (1965)
- Hüseyin Baradan Çekilin Aradan, (1965)
- Bir Garip Adam, (1965)
- Bilen Kazanıyor, (1965)
- Adım Çıkmış Sarhoşa, (1965)
- 65 Hüsnü, (1965)
- Taçsız Kral, (1965)
- Dudaktan Kalbe, (1965)
- Namus Kanla Yazılır, (1966)
- Mezarını Hazırla, (1966)
- Kanlı Mezar, (1966)
- İdam Mahkumu, (1966)
- Halime'yi Samanlıkta Vurdular, (1966)
- Fakir Bir Kız Sevdim, (1966)
- Beyoğlu'nda Vuruşanlar, (1966)
- Trafik Belma, (1967)
- Aslan Yürekli Reşat, (1967)
- Kara Gözlüm Efkarlanma, (1968)
- Ölüme Giden Yol, (1969)
- Gel Desen Gelemem Ki, (1969)
- Vurgun, (1973)
- Tanık, (1992)
