= Brilliant Future =

1964 film

Brillante Porvenir
- Theatrical release poster
- Directed by: Vicente Aranda; Román Gubern
- Written by: Vicente Aranda; Román Gubern; Ricardo Bofill
- Produced by: Sidney Pink; Stanley Abrams; Carlos Durán
- Starring: Germán Cobos; Serena Vergano; Arturo López
- Cinematography: Aurelio G. Larraya
- Edited by: Santiago Gómez
- Music by: Federico Martínez Tudó
- Distributed by: Radio Films S.A.E.
- Release date: 5 April 1965
- Running time: 93 minutes
- Country: Spain
- Language: Spanish
- Budget: 4.959.679 ₧
- Box office: 17.513,11 €

Promising Future (Spanish: Brillante Porvenir) is a 1965 Spanish film directed by Vicente Aranda and Román Gubern. Set in Neorealism style, the plot was inspired by F. Scott Fitzgerald's the Great Gatsby. Starring Germán Cobos and Italian actress Serena Vergano, it was shot in 35 mm in black and white in Castelldefels, Sitges and Barcelona.

== Plot ==
Antonio, a young man with a modest job in a small town, leads an ordinary monotonous existence until he is transferred to Barcelona to work in a firm of architects. From then on, a new life opens to him. He befriends Lorenzo, one of his coworkers. Lorenzo, more experienced than Antonio, shows him a new, more restless, and sophisticated life in which Antonio feels out of place. He falls in love with Montse, Lorenzo’s sister, and that makes him try to fit in.

One night Antonio is invited to a party offered by López, a businessman with whom Antonio has had a small confrontation before. Initially reluctant to go to the party, Antonio goes just to be with Montse. He is expelled from the party. The invitation he had was bogus, falsified by Montse. Drunk and upset, Antonio returns to the party in the company of Carmen, Lorenzo’s girlfriend, who has also been turned down. They tried to make a scene and spoil the party but are thrown out violently.

The next day Antonio tries desperately to see Montse. Her family has forbidden her any contact with him. Antonio confronts Montse for her relationship with López, but she assures him that he is the only one in her life. Upset with López, Antonio confronts him, but he is threatened by him and by Lorenzo. Antonio takes the road to Paris escaping with Montse. Halfway, he changes his mind and decides to leave her. Montse explains that he eventually stayed with her.

== Cast ==
- Germán Cobos as Antonio
- Serena Vergano as Montse
- Arturo López as Lorenzo
- José Maria Angelat as López
- Gloria Osuna as Mercè
- Josefina Güell as Carmen
- Pedro Gil as Luis

== Production ==
Brillante Porvenir marked the directorial debut of Vicente Aranda, who had to face many difficulties making the film. Aranda could not get the necessary permit from the Spanish director's guild to direct the film, due to his lack of formal education. This forced him to co-direct with film historian and theorist Román Gubern, a friend among a group of Catalan intellectuals interested in filmmaking who formed the so-called Barcelona School of Film.

The script was written by Aranda, Gubern and their mutual friend Ricardo Bofill, an architect also associated with the Barcelona School. The screenplay was loosely inspired by F. Scott Fitzgerald's the Great Gatsby in a portrait of Barcelona's upper class seen from an outsider coming from the provinces. Although Gubern worked on the screenplay and prepared the scenes to be shot each day, the actual direction of the film was completely in Aranda's hands. German Cobos was chosen to be the leading man thanks to his brother association in the theater with Roman Gubern and Joaquin Jordá, another member of the Barcelona's group of filmmakers and close friend of Gubern and Aranda. Serena Vergano, an Italian actress who had recently came to Spain to make the film El Conde Sandorf (1963), was chosen for the female lead. At the time she was involved in a romantic relationship with Ricardo Bofill.

Production of the film was problematic. There was a dispute between Ricardo Bofill, the co-scriptwriter who was present during shooting, and the cinematographer Aurelio G. Larraya. This had a negative effect in the resulting film. Brillante Porvenir was shot in various locations in Barcelona, Castelldefels and Sitges between 14 October and 6 December 1963. Location were set apart geographically and the many scenes complicated the work of Aranda, who was directing his first film.

== Reception ==
Brillante Porvenir is set within a neorealistic aesthetic, following in the footsteps of the Italian neorealism and the work of Michelangelo Antonioni, who was then popular in the art house circuits. However by the mid 1960s, when Brillante Porvenir was made, this approached seemed dated. Brillante Porvenir aspired to be a chronicle of Barcelona's upper middle class from the point of view of an outsider, a newcomer who arrives from a provincial background. This social criticism, unusual in Spanish films during Francisco Franco's regime, faced cuts from censors who eliminated parts of the script and later forced the director to alter the end of the film. These mandatory changes distorted the meaning and intentions of the film and negatively affected its reception. Brillante Porvenir was coldly received by critics and public. It was a commercial an artistic disappointment.
