= Matt Flinders =

Egyptian-Australian singer (born 1936)

- Also known as: Louis Bonett
- Born: Sylvan Louis Bonett; 20 September 1936 (age 89); Alexandria, Egypt
- Origin: Melbourne, Victoria, Australia
- Occupations: Musician; TV presenter; radio presenter
- Instruments: Vocals; guitar; double bass
- Labels: Astor; Fable
- Website: https://ycn.com.au/mattflinders/

Matt Flinders (born Sylvan Louis Bonett c. 1937, Alexandria, Egypt) is a former singer and TV presenter who rose to prominence in the late 1960s in Australia. He had top 5 hit singles with his cover versions of "Picking Up Pebbles" (1969) and "Butterfly" (1971). He hosted his own variety shows, The Matt Flinders Show (1972) and Matt Flinders and Friends (1973) on ABC-TV.

== Biography ==
Flinders was born c. 1937 as Sylvan Louis Bonett in Egypt of mixed (French, English, Italian) descent. With his parents and siblings he moved to the United Kingdom in 1950, then to Australia in 1951. Bonett undertook national service with the Royal Australian Air Force at Point Cook, Victoria in the mid-1950s. He then began singing and playing guitar in Melbourne under the name, Louis Bonett. He played double bass with musical groups, which toured Japan and Australia. In the early 1960s he returned to England, formed another musical group, which included Ted Nettelbeck on piano, and worked in London for four years.

When Flinders returned to Australia in the mid-1960s, he led the house band, as well as singing and playing double bass, at the Chevron Hotel, Melbourne. During that time he sang ads for Australian radio and TV. These came to the attention of Ron Tudor of Astor Records, who signed Flinders to a recording contract. Tudor suggested a name change so that DJs would remember and pronounce it correctly – he chose Matt Flinders for the explorer of a similar name.

Flinders' first recording for Astor was a cover version of Herman's Hermits' track "Something Is Happening". His second single, "Picking Up Pebbles", was a cover version of a 1968 track by UK artist Johnny Curtis (a.k.a. Bobby Kerr), which was released by Flinders in late 1969. It peaked at No. 4 on the Go-Set National Top 40 singles chart.

Flinders' later recorded material appeared on Tudor's own label, Fable Records. He had another No. 4 hit with his version of Danyel Gérard's "Butterfly" (late 1971). Gérard's own version of "Butterfly" reached No. 11 on the same chart. Late in 1972 he issued another single, "You", which was written by Flinders and reached the top 40.

Flinders began working as a presenter for Australian Broadcasting Corporation to present shows on both radio and TV. His TV variety shows were The Matt Flinders Show, with 13 weekly episodes from June 1972, and Matt Flinders and Friends in 1973. One year his television program won an award.

=== Personal life ===
After Matt Flinders retired from the entertainment industry he worked as a civil celebrant (as Sylvan Bonett) with his wife, Coralie, in Adelaide.

Three of Flinders' brothers also had musical careers. Arnold Lloyd Bonett (c. 1930–2016), the eldest, performed as an operatic bass baritone at the National Theatre, Melbourne and for the ABC – he received an award from the Italian Opera Festival Organisation in 1961; before he made a career change to the corporate world. Roland Bonett (c. 1934–2002) was a popular performer and dance band leader in Melbourne.

In 1965 the youngest brother, Christian ("Chris") Bonett, was recruited in Sydney by Dave Guard (who had left a US singing group, the Kingston Trio, in 1961). Chris also appeared on Guard's national TV series, Dave's Place (mid-1965) for ABC in the house band on electric bass guitar and vocals with Guard on vocals, electric and acoustic guitars, banjo and tambourine and Len Young on drums; they were joined by alternate female lead vocalists: Frances Stone, Kerrilee Male or Norma Shirlee Stoneman. He worked for two decades as a singer and bass guitarist with rock and pop bands in Australia, UK and US. He worked at Club Med resorts in France, Switzerland and the Caribbean. Chris was later a computer programmer for a farm cooperative in Kansas City, Missouri.

== Discography ==
=== Albums ===
- The Matt Flinders Album (1971) – Fable Records (FBSA-101)
- Matt Flinders on TV (by Matt Flinders and Friends) (1972) – Fable Records (FBSA-020)

=== Singles ===
- "Something Is Happening" (by Matt Flinders with orchestra) (1969) – Astor Records (A-7132)
- "Picking Up Pebbles" (late 1969) – Astor Records (A-7150) AUS: No. 4 NZ: No. 20
- "Where Has all the Love Gone?" (early 1970) – Astor Records (A-7163) AUS: No. 35
- "All of a Sudden" (late 1970) – Fable Records (FB-032) AUS: No. 37
- "How Great Thou Art" (mid-1971) – AUS: No. 60
- "Butterfly" (late 1971) – Fable Records (FB-077) AUS: No. 4
- "You" (late 1972) – AUS: No. 39
