= Valentino Bucchi =

Italian composer

Valentino Bucchi (29 November 1916 – 8 May 1976) was an Italian composer.

== Biography ==
Bucchi was born in Florence, Italy, the son of musicians. He studied at Luigi Cherubini Conservatory of Music in Florence. He died in Rome, Italy.

== Works ==
=== Theatrical works ===
- Il Giuoco del Barone, opera in one act (1937)
- Li Gieus de Robin et Marion (1953)
- Il Contrabbasso, grottesco in one act (1954)
- Una notte in paradiso, cantafavola in one act (1959-1960)
- Il Coccodrillo, opera in 4 acts (1969-1970)

=== Chamber music ===
- Sonatina for piano (1938)
- Sonatina for harp (1944)
- Racconto siciliano for two pianos (1955)
- String quartet (1956)
- Concerto for solo clarinet (1969) https://www.youtube.com/watch?v=5LhymfHEm-8&t=13s
- Soliloquios, Monodrama for solo viola (1976)

=== Vocal music ===
- Quattro liriche for voice and piano (1935-1940)
- Cinque madrigali la dolce pena for voice and chamber orchestra (1946)
- Cori della pietà morta for mixed choir and orchestra (1949-1950)
- Due filastrocche for children's choir (1958-1959)
- Colloquio Corale for solo voice, narrator, mixed choir and orchestra (1972)
- Silence for mixed choir a cappella (1972)
- Vocalizzo nel mondo dei fiori for solo voice and 10 instruments (1975)

=== Orchestral works ===
- Ballata del silenzio for orchestra (1951)
- Concerto in rondò for piano and orchestra (1957)
- Concerto lirico for violin and strings (1958)
- Banditi a Orgosolo, suite for orchestra from the music for the film of Vittorio De Seta (1965)
- Suite for orchestra (1973)
- Piccolo concerto per piccolo and strings (1973)
- Concerto di concerti for string orchestra with violin, viola, cello and contrabass obligati (1974)
- Laudes Evangelii, choreographed by Léonide Massine, filmed by Joan Kemp-Welch (1961).
