= List of Canadian number-one albums of 1970 =

This article lists the Canadian number-one albums of 1970. The chart was compiled and published by RPM every Saturday (except September 6 and 13, both of which were Sundays).

The top position (December 27, 1969, Vol. 12, No. 19) preceding January 10, 1970 (Vol. 12, No. 20-21) was The Beatles' Abbey Road. Four acts held the top position in the albums and singles charts simultaneously: Simon & Garfunkel on March 14 – April 4, The Guess Who on May 16 – 23, Creedence Clearwater Revival on September 20 – October 10 and George Harrison on December 26.

Issue date	Album	Artist
January 3	Abbey Road	The Beatles
January 10	Abbey Road	The Beatles
January 17	Abbey Road	The Beatles
January 24	Led Zeppelin II	Led Zeppelin
January 31	Led Zeppelin II	Led Zeppelin
February 7	Led Zeppelin II	Led Zeppelin
February 14	Led Zeppelin II	Led Zeppelin
February 21	Led Zeppelin II	Led Zeppelin
February 28	Led Zeppelin II	Led Zeppelin
March 7	Led Zeppelin II	Led Zeppelin
March 14	Bridge Over Troubled Water	Simon & Garfunkel
March 21	Bridge Over Troubled Water	Simon & Garfunkel
March 28	Bridge Over Troubled Water	Simon & Garfunkel
April 4	Bridge Over Troubled Water	Simon & Garfunkel
April 11	Bridge Over Troubled Water	Simon & Garfunkel
April 18	Bridge Over Troubled Water	Simon & Garfunkel
April 25	Bridge Over Troubled Water	Simon & Garfunkel
May 2	Bridge Over Troubled Water	Simon & Garfunkel
May 9	Bridge Over Troubled Water	Simon & Garfunkel
May 16	American Woman	The Guess Who
May 23	American Woman	The Guess Who
May 30	American Woman	The Guess Who
June 6	McCartney	Paul McCartney
June 13	Let It Be	The Beatles
June 20	Let It Be	The Beatles
June 27	Let It Be	The Beatles
July 4	Let It Be	The Beatles
July 11	Let It Be	The Beatles
July 18	Let It Be	The Beatles
July 25	Woodstock	Original Soundtrack
August 1	Woodstock	Original Soundtrack
August 8	Let It Be	The Beatles
August 15	Blood, Sweat & Tears 3	Blood, Sweat & Tears
August 22	Blood, Sweat & Tears 3	Blood, Sweat & Tears
August 29	Cosmo's Factory	Creedence Clearwater Revival
September 6	Cosmo's Factory	Creedence Clearwater Revival
September 13	Cosmo's Factory	Creedence Clearwater Revival
September 19	Cosmo's Factory	Creedence Clearwater Revival
September 26	Cosmo's Factory	Creedence Clearwater Revival
October 3	Cosmo's Factory	Creedence Clearwater Revival
October 10	Cosmo's Factory	Creedence Clearwater Revival
October 17	Cosmo's Factory	Creedence Clearwater Revival
October 24	Cosmo's Factory	Creedence Clearwater Revival
October 31	Cosmo's Factory	Creedence Clearwater Revival
November 7	Led Zeppelin III	Led Zeppelin
November 14	Led Zeppelin III	Led Zeppelin
November 21	Led Zeppelin III	Led Zeppelin
November 28	Led Zeppelin III	Led Zeppelin
December 5	Close to You	The Carpenters
December 12	Close to You	The Carpenters
December 19	Close to You	The Carpenters
December 26	All Things Must Pass	George Harrison

== See also ==
- 1970 in music
- RPM number-one hits of 1970
