= List of number-one hits of 1971 (Germany) =

This is a list of the German Media Control Top100 Singles Chart number-ones of 1971.

Issue date	Song	Artist
1 January	"A Song of Joy"	Miguel Ríos
8 January	"A Song of Joy"	Miguel Ríos
15 January	"A Song of Joy"	Miguel Ríos
22 January	"A Song of Joy"	Miguel Ríos
29 January	"My Sweet Lord"	George Harrison
5 February	"My Sweet Lord"	George Harrison
12 February	"My Sweet Lord"	George Harrison
19 February	"My Sweet Lord"	George Harrison
26 February	"My Sweet Lord"	George Harrison
4 March	"My Sweet Lord"	George Harrison
11 March	"My Sweet Lord"	George Harrison
18 March	"My Sweet Lord"	George Harrison
25 March	"My Sweet Lord"	George Harrison
1 April	"My Sweet Lord"	George Harrison
9 April	"(I Never Promised You a) Rose Garden"	Lynn Anderson
16 April	"Hey Tonight"	Creedence Clearwater Revival
23 April	"(I Never Promised You a) Rose Garden"	Lynn Anderson
30 April	"(I Never Promised You a) Rose Garden"	Lynn Anderson
7 May	"(I Never Promised You a) Rose Garden"	Lynn Anderson
14 May	"(I Never Promised You a) Rose Garden"	Lynn Anderson
21 May	"Butterfly"	Danyel Gérard
28 May	"Butterfly"	Danyel Gérard
4 June	"Butterfly"	Danyel Gérard
11 June	"Butterfly"	Danyel Gérard
18 June	"Butterfly"	Danyel Gérard
25 June	"Butterfly"	Danyel Gérard
2 July	"Butterfly"	Danyel Gérard
9 July	"Butterfly"	Danyel Gérard
16 July	"Butterfly"	Danyel Gérard
23 July	"Butterfly"	Danyel Gérard
30 July	"Butterfly"	Danyel Gérard
6 August	"Butterfly"	Danyel Gérard
13 August	"Butterfly"	Danyel Gérard
20 August	"Butterfly"	Danyel Gérard
27 August	"Co-Co"	The Sweet
3 September	"Co-Co"	The Sweet
10 September	"Co-Co"	The Sweet
17 September	"Co-Co"	The Sweet
24 September	"Co-Co"	The Sweet
1 October	"Co-Co"	The Sweet
8 October	"Butterfly"	Danyel Gérard
15 October	"Co-Co"	The Sweet
22 October	"Borriquito"	Peret
29 October	"Borriquito"	Peret
5 November	"Mamy Blue"	Pop Tops
12 November	"Mamy Blue"	Pop Tops
19 November	"Mamy Blue"	Pop Tops
26 November	"Mamy Blue"	Pop Tops
3 December	"Mamy Blue"	Pop Tops
10 December	"Mamy Blue"	Pop Tops
17 December	"Mamy Blue"	Pop Tops
24 December	"Mamy Blue"	Pop Tops
31 December	"Mamy Blue"	Pop Tops

== See also ==
- List of number-one hits (Germany)
