= Rat Trap (film) =

1963 film

- Directed by: Jean-Gabriel Albicocco
- Written by: Jean-Gabriel Albicocco; Jacques Lanzmann
- Produced by: Enrique Salomoni; Tomás R. Salomoni
- Starring: Charles Aznavour
- Cinematography: Quinto Albicocco
- Music by: Georges Garvarentz
- Release date: May 1963
- Running time: 94 minutes
- Country: France
- Language: French

Rat Trap (French: Le Rat d'Amérique) is a 1963 French adventure film directed by Jean-Gabriel Albicocco. It was entered into the 1963 Cannes Film Festival.

== Cast ==
In alphabetical order

- Charles Aznavour as Charles
- Richard Badouh
- Franco Fabrizi
- Matias Ferreira Diaz
- Sara Gimenez
- Emilio Gnocchi
- Zuny Joy
- Marie Laforêt
- Francois Prevost
- Roberto Zelada
