= The Brigand (1961 film) =

1961 drama film

- Directed by: Renato Castellani
- Screenplay by: Renato Castellani
- Based on: The Brigand by Giuseppe Berto
- Produced by: Angelo Rizzoli
- Starring: Adelmo Di Fraia; Serena Vergano
- Cinematography: Armando Nannuzzi
- Edited by: Jolanda Benvenuti
- Music by: Nino Rota
- Release date: 1961
- Country: Italy
- Language: Italian

The Brigand (Italian: Il brigante) is a 1961 Italian historical drama film written and directed by Renato Castellani. It premiered in competition at the 22nd edition of the Venice Film Festival.

== Cast ==
- Adelmo Di Fraia as Michele Rende
- Serena Vergano as Miliella Stigliano
- Francesco Seminario as Nino Stigliano
- Mario Ierardi as Pataro
- Anna Filippini as Giulia Ricadi
- Giovanni Basile as Fimiani
- Renato Terra as Carmelo
- Elena Sestito as Nino's Mother
- Angela Sirianni as Nino's Grandmother

== Production ==
The film was produced by Cineriz with a budged of 98 millions lire. It is based on the 1951 historical novel The Brigand by Giuseppe Berto. After a pre-production of over a year, it was shot in 10 months in Calabria. The cast mostly consisted on non-professional actors, the majority of whom recruited directly on location. In its original cut, it run about 3 and a half hour.

== Release ==
The film had its premiere at the 22nd Venice International Film Festival, in the main competition section, winning the FIPRESCI prize.

== Reception ==
Gian Luigi Rondi wrote: "The story finds in him a careful and accurate narrator, now polemical, now inspired, not always able, however, to impose a harmonious unity on the narration nor to keep the often epic atmosphere of the film clear of certain errors of taste and style, certain dramatic novelties which smack not so much of exasperation as of mere exaggeration".
