= List of best-selling compilation albums by year in the United Kingdom =

This is the list of the best-selling compilation albums in the UK each year.

== Best-selling compilation albums ==
Year	Album	Artist	Record label	Ref.
1956	Carousel	Original soundtrack	Capitol	
1957	The King and I	Original soundtrack	Capitol	
1958	My Fair Lady	Original soundtrack	Philips	
1959	South Pacific	Original soundtrack	RCA Victor	
1960	South Pacific	Original soundtrack	RCA Victor	
1961	South Pacific	Original soundtrack	RCA Victor	
1962	West Side Story	Original soundtrack	Philips	
1963	West Side Story	Original soundtrack	Philips	
1964	West Side Story	Original soundtrack	Philips	
1965	The Sound of Music	Original soundtrack	RCA Victor	
1966	The Sound of Music	Original soundtrack	RCA Victor	
1967	The Sound of Music	Original soundtrack	RCA Victor	
1968	The Sound of Music	Original soundtrack	RCA Victor	
1969	The Sound of Music	Original soundtrack	RCA Victor	
1970	Easy Rider	Original soundtrack	Stateside	
1971	Motown Chartbusters Volume 5	Various artists	Tamla Motown	
1972	20 Dynamic Hits	Various artists	K-tel	
1973	That'll Be the Day	Original soundtrack	Ronco	
1977	Disco Fever	Various artists	K-tel	
1978	Saturday Night Fever	Original soundtrack	RSO	
1983	Now 1	Various artists	Virgin/EMI	
1984	Hits 1	Various artists	CBS/WEA	
1985	Now 6	Various artists	Virgin/EMI	
1986	Now 8	Various artists	Virgin/EMI/PolyGram	
1987	Now 10	Various artists	Virgin/EMI/PolyGram	
1988	Now 13	Various artists	Virgin/EMI/PolyGram	
1999	Now 44	Various artists	Virgin/EMI	
2000	Now 47	Various artists	Virgin/EMI	
2001	Now 50	Various artists	Virgin/EMI	
2002	Now 53	Various artists	EMI Virgin/UMTV	
2003	Now 56	Various artists	EMI Virgin/UMTV	
2004	Now 59	Various artists	EMI Virgin/UMTV	
2005	Now 62	Various artists	EMI Virgin/UMTV	
2006	Now 65	Various artists	EMI Virgin/UMTV	
2007	Now 68	Various artists	EMI Virgin/UMTV	
2008	Mamma Mia!	Original soundtrack	Polydor	
2009	Now 74	Various artists	EMI Virgin/UMTV	
2010	Now 77	Various artists	EMI Virgin/UMTV	
2011	Now 80	Various artists	EMI Virgin/UMTV	
2012	Now 83	Various artists	EMI Virgin/UMTV	
2013	Now 86	Various artists	EMI Virgin/UMTV	
2014	Now 89	Various artists	EMI Virgin/UMTV	
2015	Now 92	Various artists	EMI Virgin/UMTV	
2016	Now 95	Various artists	EMI Virgin/UMTV	
2017	Now 98	Various artists	EMI Virgin/UMTV	
2018	Now 100	Various artists	EMI Virgin/UMTV	
2019	Now 104	Various artists	EMI Virgin/UMTV	

== See also ==
- List of UK Compilation Chart number ones
