= Last Year at Marienbad =

1961 film by Alain Resnais

- French theatrical release poster
- French: L'Année dernière à Marienbad
- Directed by: Alain Resnais
- Written by: Alain Robbe-Grillet
- Produced by: Pierre Courau; Raymond Froment
- Starring: Delphine Seyrig; Giorgio Albertazzi; Sacha Pitoëff
- Cinematography: Sacha Vierny
- Edited by: Henri Colpi; Jasmine Chasney
- Music by: Francis Seyrig
- Production companies: Terra Film; Société Nouvelle des Films Cormoran; Precitel; Como Films; Argos Films; Les Films Tamara; Cinétel; Silver Films; Cineriz
- Distributed by: Cocinor (France); Cineriz (Italy)
- Release dates: 29 August 1961 (Venice); 29 September 1961 (France); 1 November 1961 (Italy)
- Running time: 94 minutes
- Countries: France; Italy
- Language: French

Last Year at Marienbad (French: L'Année dernière à Marienbad), released in the United Kingdom as Last Year in Marienbad, is a 1961 French New Wave avant-garde psychological drama film directed by Alain Resnais and written by Alain Robbe-Grillet. (Note: According to Thomas Beltzer of Senses of Cinema, the film's script may have been based in part on The Invention of Morel, a science fiction novel published in 1940 by Argentine writer Adolfo Bioy Casares. The Invention of Morel is about a fugitive hiding out on a deserted island who one day awakens to discover the island miraculously filled with anachronistically dressed people who "dance, stroll up and down, and swim in the pool, as if this were a summer resort like Los Teques or Marienbad." He later learns they are creations of an inventor, Morel, whose recording machine captured the exact likenesses of a group of friends, which are "played" over and over again. Although Alain Robbe-Grillet acknowledged familiarity with the novel, Alain Resnais had not read the book at the time of making the film. Later, both a French television film, L'invention de Morel (1967), and an Italian film, L'Invenzione di Morel (1974), were produced as explicit adaptations of Bioy Casares' work.)

Set in a palace in a park that has been converted into a luxury hotel, the film stars Delphine Seyrig and Giorgio Albertazzi as a woman and a man who may have met the year before and may have contemplated or begun an affair, with Sacha Pitoëff as a second man who may be the woman's husband. The characters are unnamed.

The film won the Golden Lion at 22nd Venice International Film Festival.

== Plot ==
In an ornate baroque hotel populated by wealthy individuals and couples who socialize with one another, a man approaches a woman and claims they met the previous year at a similar resort (possibly Frederiksbad, Karlstadt, Marienbad, or Baden-Salsa) and had an affair. He asserts that she responded to his request to run away together by asking him to wait a year. The woman, however, insists she has never met the man. He attempts to remind her of their shared past, while she rebuffs him and contradicts his accounts. Between interactions with the woman, a second man, who may be her husband, asserts his dominance over the first by repeatedly defeating him in a game of Nim.

Through ambiguous flashbacks and disorienting shifts in time and location, the film explores the relationships among the three characters. Conversations and events are repeated in different parts of the building and grounds, accompanied by numerous tracking shots of the hotel's corridors with ambiguous and repetitive voice-overs. The film offers no definitive conclusion regarding what is real and what is imagined, but by the end, the woman relents and leaves the hotel with the first man.

== Cast ==
- Giorgio Albertazzi as the man
- Delphine Seyrig as the woman
- Sacha Pitoëff as the second man, who may be the woman's husband

Although the characters are unnamed in the film, in Robbe-Grillet's published "ciné-novel" of the screenplay, the first man is referred to as "X", the woman as "A", and the second man as "M".

== Production ==
Last Year at Marienbad was created out of an unusual collaboration between writer Alain Robbe-Grillet and director Alain Resnais. Robbe-Grillet described its basis:

Alain Resnais and I were able to collaborate only because we saw the film in the same way from the start; and not just in the same general outlines but exactly, in the construction of the least detail as in its total architecture. What I wrote might have been what was already in his mind; what he added during the shooting was what I might have written. ... [P]aradoxically enough, and thanks to this perfect identity of our conceptions, we almost always worked separately.

The screenplay Robbe-Grillet wrote was very detailed, specifying not only the dialogue and gestures and décor, but also the placement and movement of the camera and the sequencing of shots in the editing. Resnais filmed the script with great fidelity, and when Robbe-Grillet, who was not present during the filming, saw the rough cut, he said he found the film just as he had intended it, while recognizing how much Resnais had added to make it work on the screen and fill out what was absent from the script. Robbe-Grillet published his screenplay, illustrated by shots from the film, calling it a "ciné-roman" (ciné-novel).

Despite the close correspondence between the written and filmed works, numerous differences between them have been identified. Two notable examples are the choice of music in the film (Francis Seyrig's score introduces extensive use of a solo organ), and a scene near the end of the film in which the screenplay explicitly describes a rape, whereas the film substitutes a series of repeated overexposed tracking shots moving towards the smiling woman. In statements by the two authors of the film in the decades after its release, it was partly acknowledged that they did not entirely share the same vision of it. According to Resnais, Robbe-Grillet used to insist that it was he who wrote Marienbad, without question, and that Resnais's filming of it was a betrayal—but that, since he found it very beautiful, he did not blame Resnais for it.

Filming took place, using black-and-white film and the Dyaliscope widescreen process, over a period of ten weeks between September and November 1960. Most of Delphine Seyrig's dresses in the film were designed by Chanel. The locations used for most of the interiors and the gardens were the palaces of Schleissheim and Nymphenburg (including the Amalienburg hunting lodge) and the Antiquarium of the Munich Residenz, all in Munich. Additional interior scenes were filmed in the Photosonore-Marignan-Simo studios in Paris. No filming was done in Mariánské Lázně (Marienbad), nor does the film clarify which scenes, if any, are supposed to be set there.

=== Style ===
Still from Last Year at Marienbad. In this surreal image, the people cast long shadows, but the trees do not, because the shadows were painted and the scene shot on an overcast day.

In determining the visual appearance of the film, Resnais said he wanted to recreate "a certain style of silent cinema", which he sought to produce through his direction as well as the actors' make-up; he even asked Eastman Kodak if they could supply an old-fashioned film stock that would "bloom" or "halo" to create the look of a silent film, but they could not. Resnais showed his costume designer photographs from Marcel L'Herbier's L'Inhumaine (1924) and L'Argent (1928), for which great fashion designers of the 1920s had created the costumes, and asked members of his team to look at other silent films, particularly G. W. Pabst's Pandora's Box (1929), as he wanted Seyrig's appearance and manner to resemble that of Louise Brooks in that film. The style of silent films is also suggested by the manner in which the characters who populate the hotel are mostly seen in artificial poses rather than behaving naturalistically.

The film creates ambiguity in the spatial and temporal aspects of what it shows and creates uncertainty in the mind of the spectator about the causal relationships between events. This is achieved through editing by giving apparently incompatible information in consecutive shots, or within a single shot that seems to show impossible juxtapositions, or by means of repetitions of events in different settings. These ambiguities are matched by contradictions in the narrator's voice-over commentary. Among the notable images in the film is a scene in which two characters (and the camera) rush out of the château and are faced with a tableau of figures arranged in a geometric garden; although the people cast long dramatic shadows (which were painted on the ground), the trees in the garden do not (and are, in fact, not real trees, but constructions).

The manner in which the film is edited creates a highly nonlinear narrative. It allowed the themes of time and the mind and the interaction of past and present to be explored in an original way. As the methods of filming and editing destroyed spatial and temporal continuity, the film offers instead a "mental continuity", a continuity of thought.

While films that immediately preceded and followed Marienbad in Resnais's career showed a political engagement with contemporary issues, Marienbad focused principally on style. Commenting on this departure, Resnais said: "I was making this film at a time when I think, rightly, that one could not make a film, in France, without speaking about the Algerian War. Indeed I wonder whether the closed and stifling atmosphere of L'Année does not result from those contradictions."

== Reception ==
=== Critical response ===
Contemporary critical response to the film was polarized. The controversy was fueled when Robbe-Grillet and Resnais appeared to give contradictory answers when asked whether the man and woman had actually met at Marienbad last year or not, as this was used as a means of attacking the film by those who disliked it.

In 1963, filmmaker and writer Ado Kyrou declared the film a total triumph in his book Le Surréalisme au cinéma, recognizing the ambiguous environment and obscure motives within the film as representing many of the concerns of surrealism in narrative cinema. Another early supporter, actor and surrealist Jacques Brunius, declared that "Marienbad is the greatest film ever made".

Less reverently, film critic Pauline Kael called Marienbad "the high-fashion experimental film, the snow job at the ice palace ... back at the no-fun party for non-people". The film was included in The Fifty Worst Films of All Time (1978), in which authors Harry Medved and Randy Dreyfuss lampooned its surrealistic style and quoted numerous critics who found it to be pretentious or incomprehensible.

Although it remains disparaged by some critics, Last Year at Marienbad has come to be regarded by many as one of Resnais's greatest works. Review aggregation website They Shoot Pictures, Don't They has determined it to be the 83rd most acclaimed film in history, and it received 23 votes in the British Film Institute's decennial Sight and Sound polls. Japanese filmmaker Akira Kurosawa cited it as one of his 100 favorite films.

On the review aggregator website Rotten Tomatoes, Last Year at Marienbad holds an approval rating of 93% based on 57 reviews, with an average rating of 8.5/10. The website's critics consensus reads: "Elegantly enigmatic and dreamlike, this work of essential cinema features exquisite cinematography and an exploration of narrative still revisited by filmmakers today."

=== Accolades ===
The film was refused entry to the Cannes Film Festival, reportedly because Resnais had signed Jean-Paul Sartre's Manifesto of the 121 against the Algerian War, but it won the Golden Lion at the 22nd Venice International Film Festival in 1961. In 1962, it was chosen as the best French film of the previous year by the French Syndicate of Cinema Critics. It was selected as the French entry for Best Foreign Language Film at the 34th Academy Awards in 1962 and, though it was not chosen as one of the five nominees for that award, Robbe-Grillet was nominated for the Academy Award for Best Original Screenplay the following year for his work on the film. The film was also nominated for a Hugo Award in the Best Dramatic Presentation category.

== Interpretations ==
Numerous explanations of the film's events have been put forward, among them: that it is a version of the Orpheus and Eurydice myth, that it represents the relationship between patient and psychoanalyst, that it all takes place in the woman's mind, that it all takes place in the man's mind and depicts his refusal to acknowledge he has killed the woman he loved, and that the characters are ghosts or dead souls in limbo. Some have noted the film has the atmosphere and the form of a dream, and claim the structure of the film may be understood by the analogy of a recurring dream, or even that the man's meeting with the woman is the memory (or dream) of a dream.

Others have heeded, at least as a starting point, the indications given by Robbe-Grillet in the introduction to his "ciné-novel" of the screenplay: "Two attitudes are then possible: either the spectator will try to reconstitute some 'Cartesian' scheme—the most linear, the most rational he can devise—and this spectator will certainly find the film difficult if not incomprehensible; or else the spectator will let himself be carried along by the extraordinary images in front of him ... and to this spectator, the film will seem the 'easiest' he has ever seen: a film addressed exclusively to his sensibility, to his faculties of sight, hearing, feeling." As a suggestion of how one might view the work, he offered, "The whole film, as a matter of fact, is the story of a persuasion: it deals with a reality which the hero creates out of his own vision, out of his own words."

Resnais, for his part, gave a more abstract explanation of the film's purpose: "For me this film is an attempt, still very crude and very primitive, to approach the complexity of thought, of its processes."

== Influence ==
The impact of Last Year at Marienbad upon other filmmakers has been widely recognized and variously illustrated, extending from French directors such as Agnès Varda, Marguerite Duras, and Jacques Rivette to international figures such as Ingmar Bergman and Federico Fellini. Stanley Kubrick's The Shining (1980) and David Lynch's Inland Empire (2006) are often cited as showing the influence of Marienbad. Terence Young stated that he styled the pre-credits sequence of the James Bond film From Russia with Love (1963) after Marienbad. Peter Greenaway said the film had been the most important influence upon his own filmmaking (and he himself would go on to establish a close working relationship with its cinematographer, Sacha Vierny).

The film's visual style has been imitated in many TV commercials and fashion photography. The music video for English rock group Blur's 1994 single "To the End" parodies the film, with frontman Damon Albarn as X and guitarist Graham Coxon as M.

The film inspired a brief craze for the variation of Nim played by the characters.

Marienbad served as the main inspiration for Karl Lagerfeld's Chanel spring–summer 2011 collection, as Coco Chanel designed the costumes for the film. The setting for Lagerfeld's show consisted of a fountain and a modern replica of the film's garden. For Chanel's spring–summer 2023 collection, designer Virginie Viard reused Lagerfeld's idea of basing a collection around the film.

== Home media and restoration ==
On 23 June 2009, The Criterion Collection released Last Year at Marienbad in the United States, on both Region 1 DVD and Blu-ray. Alain Resnais participated in this release, and he insisted it include an unrestored soundtrack in addition to the restored one, saying:

Sound recording and reproduction techniques have changed a lot over the decades. If one remasters a film so as to tailor it to the standards of 2009, there is a danger of altering drastically the balance of the voices, the sound effects, and the music. By correcting so-called flaws, one can lose the style of a film altogether. It is better to respect the sound characteristics of the time, especially as in most cases they do not disturb the viewer anymore after two minutes.

The Criterion packaging of the film went out of print in March 2013.

In July 2018, a restored version of Last Year at Marienbad was selected to be screened in the Venice Classics section of the 75th Venice International Film Festival. The restored version was released theatrically in France on 19 September 2018 by Tamasa Distribution, followed by a DVD and Blu-ray release on 25 September by StudioCanal. In the United States, it was released on DVD and Blu-ray on 25 August 2019 by Kino Classics.
