= Mon amour, mon ami =

Single by Marie Laforêt
- Language: French
- Released: 1967
- Label: Disques Festival
- Songwriter(s): André Popp, Eddy Marnay

Music video
- "Mon amour, mon ami" (ORTF, 1967) on YouTube

"Mon amour, mon ami" is a song by French singer and actress Marie Laforêt. It originally appeared on her 1967 EP Marie Laforêt vol. XIII (also known as Mon amour, mon ami).

== Composition ==
The song was written by André Popp and Eddy Marnay.

== Track listing ==
7-inch EP Marie Laforêt vol. XIII (1967, Festival FX 1531 M)

A1. "Mon amour, mon ami"
A2. "Sébastien"
B1. "Je suis folle de vous"
B2. "Mon village au fond de l'eau"

== Charts ==
"Mon amour, mon ami" / "Je suis folle de vous"

Chart (1967)	Peak position
Argentina	2
Belgium (Ultratop 50 Wallonia)	25

== Covers ==
In 1968 Turkish singer Gönül Yazar covered the song in Turkish as "Çapkın Kız".

The song was notably performed by Virginie Ledoyen in François Ozon's 2002 movie 8 Women and by Swedish symphonic metal band Therion in 2012.
