= Rain, Rain, Rain =

1973 song by Simon Butterfly

Single by Simon Butterfly
- Language: English
- Released: 1973
- Label: Polydor

"Viens, viens"

Single by Marie Laforêt
- Language: French
- Released: 1977
- Label: Polydor

Music video
- "Viens, viens" (ORTF, 1973) on YouTube

"Rain, Rain, Rain" is a song, originally released in English in 1973 by German singer and music producer Simon Butterfly (real name: Bernd Simon).

In the same year it was adapted into French under the title "Viens, viens" and recorded by Marie Laforêt, and in Italian as "Lei, lei" and was recorded by both Dalida and Laforet.

A Greek version with the title "Zitas" (Greek: Ζητάς) was recorded in 1974 by Marianna Toli and in 1991 by Evridiki.

A Slovak version with the title "He Went, He Went" (Slovak: Šiel, šiel) was recorded in 1974 by Karol Duchoň. Lyrics was written by Ján Štrasser.

== Background and writing ==
The original was produced by Bernd Simon (Simon Butterfly) himself.

== Charts ==
"Rain, Rain Rain" by Simon Butterfly

Chart (1973)	Peak position
Austria (Ö3 Austria Top 40)	17
Belgium (Ultratop 50 Wallonia)	41
Switzerland (Schweizer Hitparade)	4
West Germany (GfK)	20

"Viens, viens" by Marie Laforêt

Chart (1973)	Peak position
Belgium (Ultratop 50 Wallonia)	2
West Germany (GfK)	30
