= The Mad Heart =

1970 drama film

- Directed by: Jean-Gabriel Albicocco
- Screenplay by: Jean-Gabriel Albicocco; Pierre Pelegri; Philippe Demarcay
- Starring: Michel Auclair; Ewa Swann; Madeleine Robinson
- Cinematography: Quinto Albicocco
- Edited by: Georges Klotz
- Music by: Jean-Pierre Bourtayre
- Release date: 1970
- Language: French

The Mad Heart (French: Le Cœur fou) is a 1970 French romantic drama film co-written and directed by Jean-Gabriel Albicocco. It was screened at the 31st edition of the Venice Film Festival.

== Cast ==
- Michel Auclair as Serge
- Ewa Swann as Clo
- Madeleine Robinson as Clara
- Brigitte Auber as Cécile
- Jean-Claude Michel as Georges
- Maurice Garrel as Dr. Auger
- Daniel Cauchy
- Colette Régis
- Marc Michel
- Serge Sauvion
- Martine Chevallier
