= Serena Vergano =

Italian actress

- Born: 25 August 1943 (age 82); Milan, Italy
- Occupation: Film actress
- Years active: since 1960
- Spouses: Ricardo Bofill (divorced)
- Father: Aldo Vergano

Serena Vergano born Adalgisa Serena Maggiora Vergano (25 August 1943 in Milan, Italy), is an Italian actress. She was the muse of the Barcelona School of Film, acting in many of the films of this movement.

== Career ==
Daughter of the director Aldo Vergano, she was born Adalgisa Serena Maggiora Vergano in Milan, Italy in 1943. She studied Dramatic Art in Rome, beginning her career as an actress in the film "I dolci Inganni" (1960). After working in half a dozen Italian films like The Brigand (1961) by Renato Castellani and Family Diary (1962) by Valerio Zurlini, she went to Spain to film Mathias Sandorf (1963), an Italo-Spanish production directed by Georges Lampin, and she decided to settle in Spain. She became the muse of the Barcelona School of Film, taking leading roles in many productions of this film movement including: Brillante Porvenir (1963), directed by Vicente Aranda, Noche de vino tinto (1966) directed by José Maria Nunes, Una Historia de Amor (1966) and Historia de una chica sola (1969) both directed by Jorge Grau; Dante no es unicamente severo 1967 by Jacinto Esteva and Joaquin Jordá; Cada vez que... estoy enamorada creo que es para siempre (1968) and Liberxina 90 (1970) by Carlos Durá, Un invierno en Mallorca (1969) directed by Jaime Camino and Esquizo (1970) directed by Ricardo Bofill. She also made some films in Madrid with her accented voice dubbed: Al ponerse el sol (1967), Let Them Talk (1968), both directed by Mario Camus, La Lola, dicen que no vive sola (1970) directed by Jaime de Armiñan and Carta de Amor de un Asesino (1972) by Francisco Regueiro. She retired in the early 1970s, returning to acting only sporadically and in secondary roles during the 1980s.

== Selected filmography ==
- Sweet Deceptions (1960)
- The Brigand (1961)
- Mathias Sandorf (1963)
- Destination Rome (1963)
- Brillante Porvenir (1963)
- Digan lo que digan (1968)
- Carta de amor de un asesino (1972)

== Family ==
She met architect Ricardo Bofill in 1962. They married and had a son, Ricardo Emilio Bofill, born in 1965.
