= The Girl with the Golden Eyes (film) =

1961 drama film

- Directed by: Jean-Gabriel Albicocco
- Screenplay by: Pierre Pelegri; Philippe Dumarçay
- Produced by: Gilbert de Goldschmidt
- Starring: Marie Laforêt; Paul Guers
- Cinematography: Quinto Albicocco
- Edited by: Georges Klotz
- Music by: Narciso Yepes
- Release date: 1961
- Language: French

The Girl with the Golden Eyes (French: La fille aux yeux d'or, Italian: La ragazza dagli occhi d'oro) is a 1961 drama film directed by Jean-Gabriel Albicocco and starring Marie Laforêt.

A French-Italian co-production, it is based on the 1835 novella with the same name by Honoré de Balzac. It entered the main competition at the 22nd edition of the Venice Film Festival. The title of the film went on to become Laforêt's lifelong nickname.

== Cast ==
- Marie Laforêt as the Girl
- Paul Guers as Henri de Marsay
- Françoise Prévost as Éléonore aka 'Léo'
- Françoise Dorléac as Katia
- Jacques Verlier as Paul de Manerville
- Alice Sapritch as madame Alberte
- Carla Marlier as Sonia
- Frédéric de Pasquale as Willy
- Guy Martin as Chabert
- Jacques Herlin as Taxi Driver

== Reception ==
Bosley Crowther for the New York Times said the film "hit the jackpot of intentional obscurity", but also called it one of the best photographed French films for some time.
