= Far from the Trees =

- Directed by: Jacinto Esteva Grew
- Produced by: Filmscontacto
- Cinematography: Juan Amorós, Juan Julio Baena, Luis Cuadrado, Francisco Marín, Milton Stefani
- Music by: Johnny Galvao, Carlos Maleras, Marco Rossi.
- Release date: June 5, 1972
- Running time: 103 minutes
- Language: Spanish

Far from the Trees (Spanish: Lejos de los árboles) is a documentary film by Spanish artist and director Jacinto Esteva Grew. Shot in 1963, it was held up for nine years before its release in 1972.

A documentary told as a travelogue and intent on exposing the intense poverty of areas of Spain outside of the touristic eye, Far from the Trees is considered by some a successor to Luis Buñuel's Land Without Bread. As a political statement, the film is a protest to the image of a newly modernized Spain being promoted by Franco.
