= Barcelona School of Film =

The Barcelona School of Film (Catalan: Escola de Barcelona, Spanish: Escuela de Barcelona) was a group of Catalan filmmakers or a movement of cinematic innovation beginning in the 1960s concerned with the disruption of daily life by the unexpected, whose stylistic affinities lie with the pop art movement of the same years. It was modern, experimental, intellectual and against the Franco regime.

== Overview ==
Their aim was to move away from the social realist films that had become associated with the New Spanish Cinema. They took cues from the French New Wave.

The main representatives of the Barcelona School were Jacinto Esteva, Joaquim Jordà, considered the ideologist behind the group, Carles Duran and Ricard Bofill Levi. Other filmmakers are also associated with the group at different points: the Portuguese director José María Nunes, the Asturian Gonzalo Suárez, the Valencian Llorenç Soler and the Catalans Vicente Aranda, Pere Portabella, Jordi Grau and Jaime Camino.

Other people associated with the movement were actors, actresses and models such as Serena Vergano, Carmen "Romy" Romero, Teresa Gimpera, Emma Beltran (later Cohen), Luis Ciges, Enrique Irazoqui and Carlos Otero, cinema historian Romà Gubern, scriptwriter and production assistant Ricard Muñoz Suay, directors of photography Joan Amorós, Aurelio G. Larraya, Jaume Deu i Casas and Manel Esteban (later also a director), the writer Enrique Vila-Matas with the magazine Fotogramas as a platform, the photographer Leopoldo Pomés, and various others.

One of the most significant films produced by the group in the 1960s was Esteva and Jordà's Dante no es únicamente severo (1966-67), but also highly significant were Aranda's Fata Morgana (1965), Nunes' Noche de vino tinto (1965-66) and Biotaxia (1967), Bofill's short Circles (1966), Portabella's No compteu amb els dits (1967) and Nocturn 29 (1968), Duran's Cada vez que... (1967), Suárez' Ditirambo (1967), and Esteva's Después del diluvio (1968).

From this so-called Escola de Barcelona, originally more experimental and cosmopolitan, came Vicente Aranda, Jaime Camino, and Gonzalo Suárez's master works from the 1980s.
