= Salvo Cuccia =

Italian cinema director and screenwriter

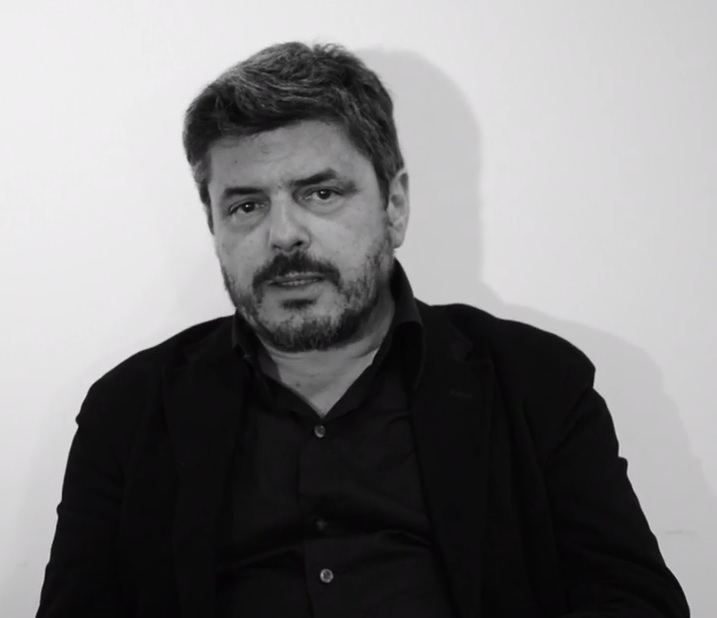
- Born: 14 July 1960 (age 66); Palermo, Italy
- Occupations: Film director, screenwriter
- Years active: 1993–present

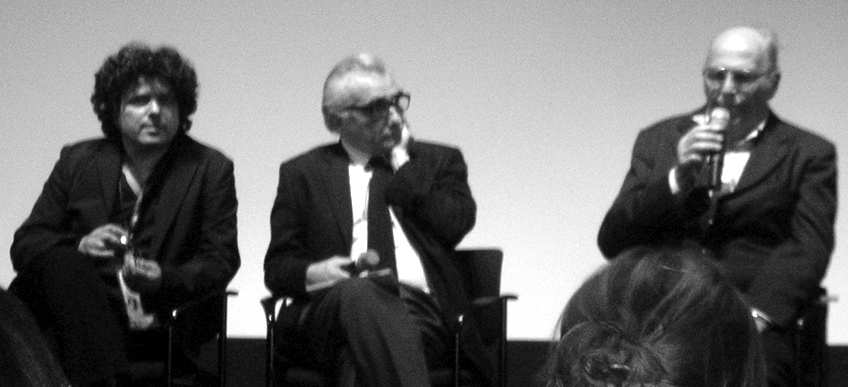
From left: Salvo Cuccia, Martin Scorsese and Vittorio De Seta at the 2005 Tribeca Film Festival

Salvo Cuccia (born July 14, 1960) is an Italian cinema director and screenwriter.

== Filmography ==
- 1993. Duo with Peter Kowald.
- 1995. Un sogno di lumaca.
- 2003. Il Satiro danzante.
- 2004. Détour De Seta.
- 2006. Oltre Selinunte.
- 2007. Rockarbëresh.
- 2008. Fuori Rotta.
- 2013. Summer 82 when Zappa came to Sicily.
- 2019. Prospettiva de Ballaró

== Awards ==
- 1995. Torino Film Festival, second prize Spazio Italia Fiction, with Un sogno di lumaca.
- 2005. Genova Film Festival, Best documentary film, with Détour De Seta.
- 2006. Torino Film Festival, CinemAvvenire Prize, Best Italian documentary film, with Oltre Selinunte.
