= Destination Rome =

- Directed by: Denys de La Patellière
- Written by: Diego Fabbri; Albert Valentin
- Produced by: Roland Girard; Marcello Danon
- Starring: Charles Aznavour; Serena Vergano; Marisa Merlini; Arletty
- Cinematography: Marcel Grignon
- Edited by: Denise Baby; Renée Lichtig
- Music by: Georges Garvarentz
- Production companies: Les Films du Cyclope; Da Ma Produzione
- Distributed by: Pathé Consortium Cinéma
- Release date: 18 January 1963
- Running time: 94 minutes
- Countries: France; Italy
- Language: French

Destination Rome (French: Tempo di Roma, Italian: Esame di guida) is a 1963 French-Italian comedy film directed by Denys de La Patellière and starring Charles Aznavour, Serena Vergano, Marisa Merlini and Arletty. It was one of a large number of co-productions made between the countries in the post-war era.

== Cast ==
- Charles Aznavour as Marcello
- Serena Vergano as Geronima
- Marisa Merlini as Pia
- Arletty as La marquise
- Gregor von Rezzori as Sir Craven
- Alberto Lupo as Paolino
- Monique Bertho as La prostituée
- Marcella Valeri as Francesca
- Mario Carotenuto as Le cardinal
- Gianrico Tedeschi as a Crook
- Fanfulla as Torquato
- Burt Nelson
- Jean-Michel Audin

== Bibliography ==
- Jean A. Gili & Aldo Tassone. Parigi-Roma: 50 anni di coproduzioni italo-francesi (1945-1995). Editrice Il castoro, 1995.
