= A Song of Joy =

Single by Miguel Ríos
- B-side: "El Rio"
- Released: 1969
- Genre: Rock, pop
- Length: 4:45
- Label: A&M
- Songwriters: Orbe (Spanish lyrics); Ross Parker (English lyrics); Waldo de los Rios (musical adaptation); Ludwig van Beethoven
- Producer: Hispavox

"A Song of Joy" ("Himno a la alegría") is the title of a popular rock song by the Spanish singer and actor Miguel Ríos. It is set to the tune of the Ninth Symphony by Ludwig van Beethoven, as arranged by Waldo de los Ríos, who specialized in arranging classical music to contemporary rhythms. The same melody is used in the well-known Christian hymn, "Joyful, Joyful We Adore Thee."

The single was enormously popular in many countries in 1970 (see 1970 in music), reaching number 1 on music charts in Australia, Canada, Germany, Switzerland, and the Easy Listening chart in the United States. On the U.S. pop chart, the song peaked at number 14 and was the only Top 40 hit for Ríos. In the United Kingdom, it reached number 16 on the British pop chart. In Germany, the song is the most successful pop hymn ever. The single sold over four million copies worldwide.

The song was used for hymns and anthems. It is most popularly used for the anthem of Teleton (Chile) and its other telethons.

== Chart history ==
=== Weekly charts ===
Chart (1969–70)	Peak position
Australia (Kent Music Report)	1
Austria	1
Canada RPM Top Singles	1
Germany	1
Indonesia (Aktuil)	2
Ireland (IRMA)	16
New Zealand (Listener)	5
South Africa (Springbok)	3
Switzerland	1
UK	16
US Billboard Hot 100	14
US Adult Contemporary (Billboard)	1
US Cash Box Top 100	9

=== Year-end charts ===
Chart (1970)	Rank
Australia	17
Canada	33
Switzerland	1
US (Joel Whitburn's Pop Annual)	122
US Billboard Easy Listening	16

== See also ==
- List of number-one singles in Australia during the 1970s
- List of RPM number-one singles of 1970
- List of number-one hits of 1970 and 1971 (Germany)
- List of number-one hits of 1970 (Switzerland)
- List of number-one adult contemporary singles of 1970 (U.S.)
- List of best-selling Latin singles
