= Détour De Seta =

2004 film by Salvo Cuccia

- Directed by: Salvo Cuccia
- Written by: Benny Atria, Salvo Cuccia
- Produced by: Alessandro Rais
- Starring: Vittorio De Seta
- Cinematography: Vincenzo Marinese
- Edited by: Benny Atria
- Music by: Domenico Sciajno
- Distributed by: Palomar-Endemol
- Release date: 2004 (Italy)
- Running time: 57 minutes
- Language: Italian

Détour De Seta is a 2004 documentary film directed by Salvo Cuccia about Vittorio De Seta.

== Synopsis ==
By tracing the places of Vittorio De Seta films and looking for people who had contact with him, as the Cozzo Disi sulfur miners, Ganzirri swordfish fishermens and shepherds who attended in drama Banditi a Orgosolo, the documentary focuses on great change started in local cultures of the Southern Italy from 1945.

The film includes an interview with De Seta, conversations with the film directors Luciano Tovoli, Franco Maresco, Gianfranco Pannone, writers Vincenzo Consolo, Goffredo Fofi, Eugenio Turri and the critic Marco Gazzano.

Set in Calabria, Sardinia and Sicily, the film was shot in 35mm film and digital, contains stock footage and images taken by De Seta.

== Festivals ==
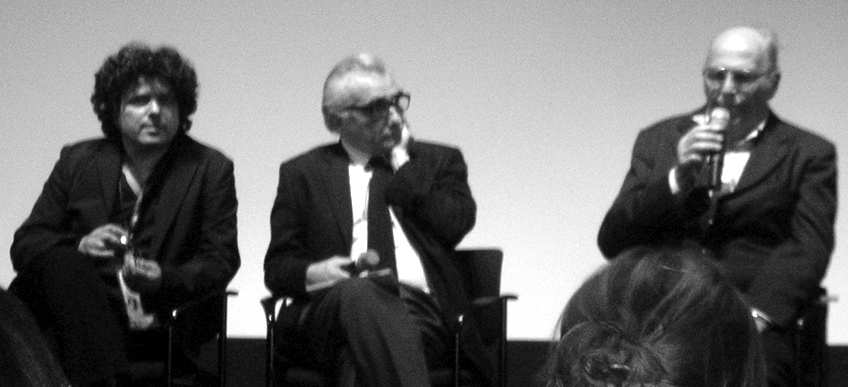
Salvo Cuccia, Martin Scorsese and Vittorio De Seta at the Tribeca Film Festival (2005)

- Détour De Seta was screened for the first time at the 2004 Locarno Film Festival.
- In order to celebrate Vittorio De Seta, the documentary was introduced by Martin Scorsese at the 2005 Tribeca Film Festival and Full Frame Documentary Film Festival.
- 2007. BigScreen Festival: Docs & Movies. Kunming (Yunnan - China).
- 2008. Histoires d'It. Le nouveau documentaire italien. Italian Cultural Institute in Paris.

== Awards ==
- It won as best documentary in the 2005 Genova Film Festival.

== See also ==
- Banditi a Orgosolo
- Il mondo perduto
