= Manuel A. Esteva =

Consul General of Mexico to the United States (1878–1936)

Manuel A. Esteva Ruiz
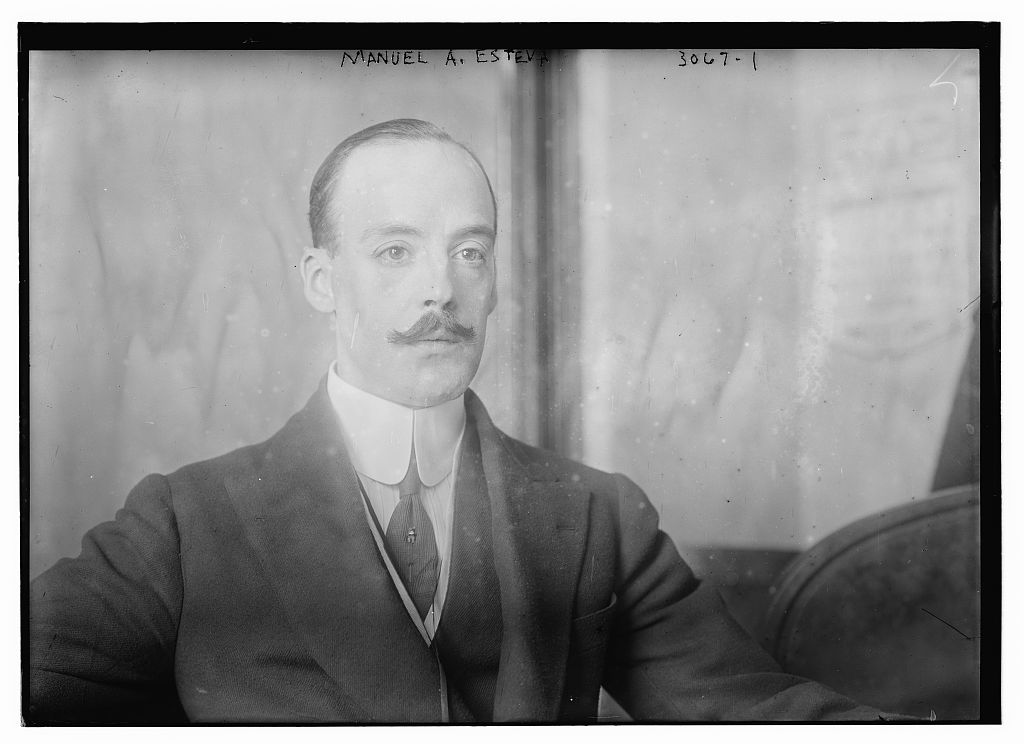
- Esteva in 1914

Consul General of Mexico to the United States
- Incumbent
- Assumed office 1914

Personal details
- Born: 1878
- Died: December 16, 1936 (aged 57–58)
- Known for: Diplomatic service during the Mexican Revolution

Manuel A. Esteva Ruiz (1878 – December 16, 1936) was the Consul General of Mexico to the United States in 1914 during the Mexican Revolution.

== See also ==
- Foreign relations of Mexico
- Mexico-United States relations
