= Jacinto Esteva Grewe =

Jacinto Esteva Grewe (Barcelona, Catalonia, Spain, 1936 - Barcelona, Catalonia, Spain, September 9, 1985) was a Spanish film director one of the founders of the Barcelona School of Film.

== Biography ==
He studied Philosophy and Letters in Barcelona and four courses of Architecture in Geneva (Switzerland), specializing in urban planning at the Sorbonne in Paris (France).

In 1960, he directed a short film by Paolo Brunatto, Notes sur l'émigration. Espagne 1960. In 1962, he filmed two additional shorts: Alrededor de las salinas and Picasso. 1966 marked his debut feature release with the film Far from the trees. The film, which wasn't released for seven years after its production, was considered by some critics as an update of Luis Buñuel's Land Without Bread.

In 1965, he began his work in the film industry with the founding of the company Filmscontacto, based on the so-called Barcelona School of Film. His last film was Después del diluvio (After the Flood). At the time of his death, he had prepared a script with Luis Azcona, Icarus, which was not carried out.

== Filmography ==
- Far from the Trees (Lejos de los árboles) (1972)
- After the Flood (film) (Después del diluvio) (1970)
- Metamorfosis (film) (Metamorphosis) (1970)
- Dante is Not Only Severe (Dante no es únicamente severo) (1967)
