= List of number-one singles of 1970 (Canada) =

This is a list of the weekly Canadian RPM magazine (Note: The magazine's weekly record charts were digitized by the AV Trust. The collection is archived by Library and Archives Canada here. The PDF text search does not work unless you have additional software installed. You must view each entry on the chart for a match.) number one Top Singles chart of 1970. (Note: A collection of all the .pdf files cited is available here.) (Note: On 21 March 1966, the chart became the RPM 100, as expanded to the top 100 singles.)

Volume:Issue	Issue Date(s)	Song	Artist
12:20 (Note: The first issue of 1970 was a single issue combining two weeks (3 January and 10 January).)	3 January	"Raindrops Keep Fallin' on My Head"	B. J. Thomas
12:21	10 January	"Raindrops Keep Fallin' on My Head"	B. J. Thomas
12:22	17 January	"Raindrops Keep Fallin' on My Head"	B. J. Thomas
12:23	24 January	"Jingle Jangle"	The Archies
12:24	31 January	"Venus"	Shocking Blue
12:25	7 February	"Venus"	Shocking Blue
12:26	14 February	"Without Love"	Tom Jones
13:1	21 February	"Hey There Lonely Girl"	Eddie Holman
13:2	28 February	"No Time"	Guess Who
13:3	7 March	"No Time"	Guess Who
13:4	14 March	"Bridge over Troubled Water"	Simon & Garfunkel
13:5	21 March	"Bridge over Troubled Water"	Simon & Garfunkel
13:6	28 March	"Bridge over Troubled Water"	Simon & Garfunkel
13:7	4 April	"Bridge over Troubled Water"	Simon & Garfunkel
13:8	11 April	"Let It Be"	The Beatles
13:9	18 April	"Let It Be"	The Beatles
13:10	25 April	"Let It Be"	The Beatles
13:11	2 May	"Spirit In the Sky"	Norman Greenbaum
13:12	9 May	"American Woman"	Guess Who
13:13	16 May	"American Woman"	Guess Who
13:14	23 May	"American Woman"	Guess Who
13:15	30 May	"Up Around the Bend"	Creedence Clearwater Revival
13:16	6 June	"Up Around the Bend"	Creedence Clearwater Revival
13:17	13 June	"Everything Is Beautiful"	Ray Stevens
13:18	20 June	"The Long and Winding Road"	The Beatles
13:19	27 June	"The Long and Winding Road"	The Beatles
13:20	4 July	"Get Ready"	Rare Earth
13:21	11 July	"Lay Down"	Melanie feat. the Edwin Hawkins Singers
13:22	18 July	"Lay Down"	Melanie feat. the Edwin Hawkins Singers
13:23	25 July	"A Song of Joy"	Miguel Ríos
13:24	1 August	"A Song of Joy"	Miguel Ríos
13:25	8 August	"(They Long to Be) Close to You"	The Carpenters
13:26	15 August	"(They Long to Be) Close to You"	The Carpenters
14:1	22 August	"As the Years Go By"	Mashmakhan
14:2	29 August	"As the Years Go By"	Mashmakhan
14:3	5 September	"In the Summertime"	Mungo Jerry
14:4	12 September	"In the Summertime"	Mungo Jerry
14:5	19 September	"War"	Edwin Starr
14:6	26 September	"Lookin' Out My Back Door"	Creedence Clearwater Revival
14:7	3 October	"Lookin' Out My Back Door"	Creedence Clearwater Revival
14:8	10 October	"Lookin' Out My Back Door"	Creedence Clearwater Revival
14:9	17 October	"Cracklin' Rosie"	Neil Diamond
14:10	24 October	"Cracklin' Rosie"	Neil Diamond
14:11	31 October	"Green-Eyed Lady"	Sugar Loaf
14:12	7 November	"Green-Eyed Lady"	Sugar Loaf
14:13	14 November	"We've Only Just Begun"	The Carpenters
14:14	21 November	"I Think I Love You"	The Partridge Family
14:15	28 November	"I Think I Love You"	The Partridge Family
14:16	5 December	"I Think I Love You"	The Partridge Family
14:17	12 December	"I Think I Love You"	The Partridge Family
14:18	19 December	"Isn't It a Pity"	George Harrison
14:19	26 December	"Isn't It a Pity"	George Harrison

== See also ==
- 1970 in music
- List of Billboard Hot 100 number ones of 1970
- List of Cashbox Top 100 number-one singles of 1970
