= Banditi a Orgosolo =

1961 film

- Theatrical release poster
- Directed by: Vittorio De Seta
- Written by: Vittorio De Seta; Vera Gherarducci
- Produced by: Vittorio De Seta
- Starring: Vittorina Pisano
- Cinematography: Vittorio De Seta; Marcello Gallinelli; Luciano Tovoli
- Edited by: Jolanda Benvenuti
- Music by: Valentino Bucchi
- Release date: 1961
- Running time: 98 minutes
- Country: Italy
- Language: Italian

Banditi a Orgosolo (Bandits of Orgosolo) is a 1961 Italian film drama directed by Vittorio De Seta. De Seta won an Award for the film at the Venice Film Festival.

== Plot ==
Michele, a shepherd of Orgoloso, Sardinia who is wrongly suspected of involvement with bandits he encountered who committed pig rustling and killed a policeman, flees to the hills with his flock, which he bought on credit after a poor previous year, and young shepherd brother, rather than surrender and risk losing them during the investigation and thus his family's income. He is pursued by police and, in his journey into the inaccessible areas of Barbagia, where there is little water or pasture, loses his sheep.

One night, deep in debt and facing impending trials, he enters a sheepfold and steals another shepherd's flock. Michele has become a bandit.

== Cast ==
- Michele Cossu ... Michele Cossu
- Peppeddu Cuccu ... Peppeddu Cossu
- Vittorina Pisano ... Mintonia

== Production ==
Banditi a Orgosolo was De Seta's first fiction feature film. The film originally started as a documentary with the actors credited as Sardinian Shepherds.

Michele Cossu was dubbed by Gian Maria Volonté.

== Release ==
Pathé-Contemporary Films released Banditi a Orgosolo in the United States in 1964.

== See also ==
- Il mondo perduto
- Détour De Seta
