= Dark Journey (1961 film) =

1961 drama film

- Directed by: Léonard Keigel
- Screenplay by: Léonard Keigel; René Gérard
- Produced by: Pierre Jourdan
- Starring: Louis Jourdan; Lilli Palmer; Marie Laforêt; Madeleine Robinson
- Cinematography: Nicolas Hayer
- Edited by: Armand Psenny
- Music by: Arnold Schoenberg
- Release date: 1961
- Language: French

Dark Journey (French: Leviathan) is a 1961 French drama film co-written and directed by Léonard Keigel and starring Louis Jourdan, Lilli Palmer and Marie Laforêt. Based on the 1835 novel Léviathan by Julien Green, it was screened at the 22nd edition of the Venice Film Festival, in the Informativa sidebar.

== Cast ==
- Louis Jourdan as Paul Guéret
- Lilli Palmer as Éva Grosgeorges
- Marie Laforêt as Angèle
- Madeleine Robinson as Madame Londe
- Georges Wilson as Monsieur Grosgeorges
- Édouard Francomme as the Old Man
- Nathalie Nerval as Marie Guéret
- Patrick Monneron as André
