= Leopoldo Pomés =

Catalan photographer and publicist (1931–2019)

- Born: 17 November 1931; Barcelona
- Died: 27 August 2019 (aged 87)
- Occupations: photographer and publicist
- Known for: Flash flash

Leopoldo Pomés Campello (17 November 1931 – 27 August 2019) was a Spanish photographer and publicist.

He completed his primary studies and began secondary school in his hometown. He became then interested in the photography, and learned in a self-taught way. In 1955 he made his first exhibition at Barcelona's Galeries Laietanes. This exhibition was very well valued by the members of the artistic collective Dau al Set, who had posed for some of those portraits. His work was made known nationally after his participation in the Yearbook of Spanish Photography of 1958 edited by AFAL, along with other avant-garde photographers at that time. Then Pomés opted for audiovisual production in advertising.

He joined the Pentágono PR agency, at that time was one of the most prominent local agencies for cinema and advertising. In 1961 he founded with Karin Leiz Studio Pomés, with whom he became famous as an advertising photographer. He also directed the advertising agency Tiempo. He is known for the creation of the Freixenet bubbles. He was the advertising director of the Freixenet Group brand and director of many of his advertising spots. He also developed spots for other brands. He achieved first publicity awards at the Venice Biennale and the Cannes Festival.

Next to Víctor Sagi he directed the opening show of the 1982 Soccer World Cup in Barcelona. He was chosen to create the image campaign for the candidature to organize the 1992 Summer Olympics in Barcelona.

He also created the restaurants Flash Flash and Il Giardinetto, both in Barcelona, the first specialized in tortillas and the second in Italian gastronomy.

In 2018 he obtained the National Photography Prize of Spain.
