= Luis Andrés Esteva =

Mexican politician

- Born: 26 August 1951 (age 74); Oaxaca, Oaxaca, Mexico
- Education: UABJO
- Occupation: Politician
- Political party: PAN

Luis Andrés Esteva Melchor (born 26 August 1951) is a Mexican politician affiliated with the National Action Party. As of 2014 he served as Deputy of the LVI and LIX Legislatures of the Mexican Congress as a plurinominal representative.
