= 20 Dynamic Hits =

Compilation album by Various Artists
- Released: 1972
- Label: K-Tel

20 Dynamic Hits is a compilation album released on vinyl by K-Tel in 1972. It reached number 1 in the UK and was the first album put together specifically for telemarketing in that country. At a time when various artists compilations were eligible for inclusion on the UK's Official Album Chart, this was the biggest selling album of 1972.

== Track listing ==
1. Argent – Hold Your Head Up
2. The Fortunes – Storm in a Teacup
3. Deep Purple – Fireball
4. Danyel Gérard – Butterfly
5. Ronnie Dyson – When You Get Right Down To It
6. Cilla Black – Something Tells Me (Something's Gonna Happen Tonight)
7. Redbone – The Witch Queen of New Orleans
8. The Move – Tonight
9. Colin Blunstone – Say You Don't Mind
10. The Congregation – Softly Whispering I Love You
11. Hurricane Smith – Oh, Babe, What Would You Say?
12. Deep Purple – Black Night
13. Christie – Iron Horse
14. Sly and The Family Stone – Family Affair
15. Santana – Everybody's Everything
16. New World – Tom-Tom Turnaround
17. Fame & Price – Rosetta
18. Blue Mink – Banner Man
19. Hurricane Smith – Don't Let It Die
20. Blood, Sweat & Tears – Go Down Gamblin'
