= Jean-Gabriel Albicocco =

French film director

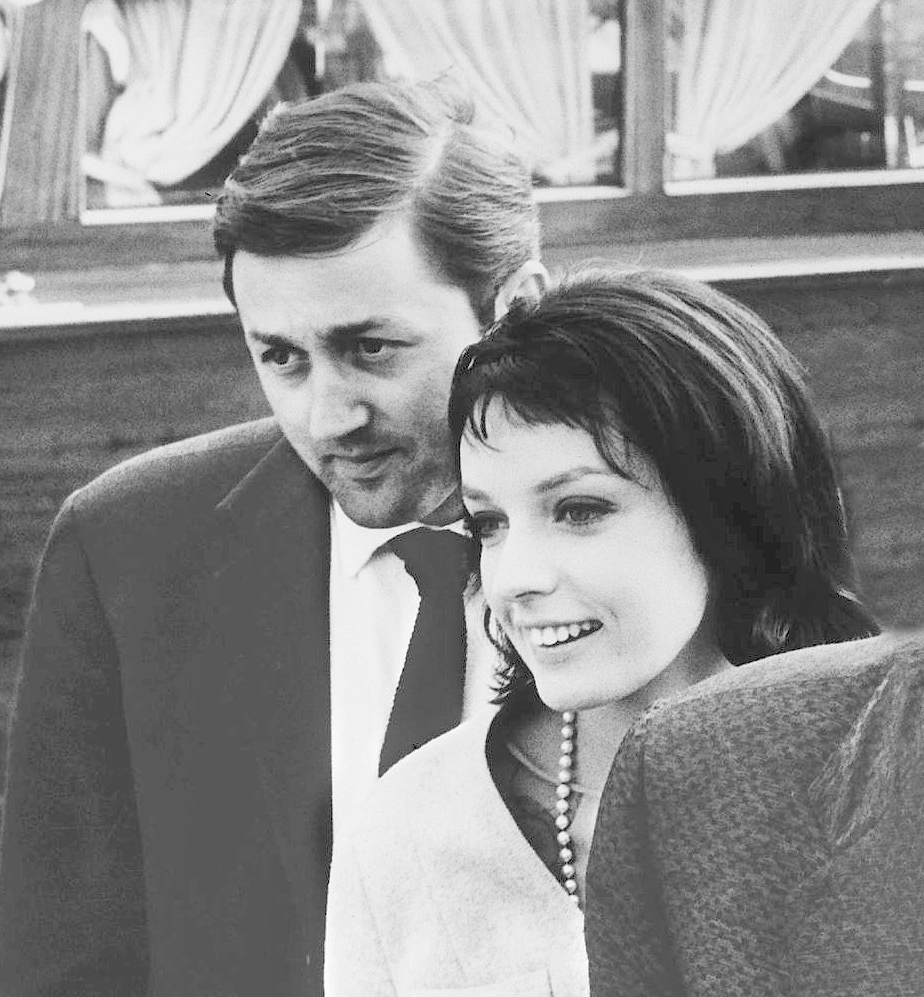

Jean-Gabriel Albicocco (15 February 1936, Cannes – 10 April 2001, Rio de Janeiro) was a French film director. He is considered a figure of the French New Wave cinema or Nouvelle Vague. In 1960, he married French actress and singer Marie Laforêt.

== Films ==
- 1961 : The Girl with the Golden Eyes
- 1962 : Rat Trap
- 1967 : The Wanderer
- 1970 : The Mad Heart
- 1971 : Le Petit matin
- 1971 : Faire l'amour : De la pilule à l'ordinateur (anthology film)
