= Butterfly (Danyel Gérard song) =

- 7" vinyl single cover

Single by Danyel Gérard

from the album Butterfly
- B-side: "Le Petit Ours En Pluche"
- Released: 1970
- Recorded: 1969
- Genre: Pop
- Length: 3:23
- Label: CBS Records
- Songwriter: Danyel Gérard
- Producers: Claude Vallois, Hervé Roy

Danyel Gérard singles chronology
| "Helas Trois Fois Helas" (1969) | "Butterfly" (1970) | "Avec Ces Deux Mains Là/Sexologie" (1970) |

"Butterfly" is a pop song, written and recorded by the French singer-songwriter, Danyel Gérard (born Gérard Daniel Khertakian, 7 March 1939, Paris) in the late 1960s. It was initially a hit in the French language.

In the early 1970s, English words were written, and Gérard recorded it again in the United States. In 1971 he also recorded German, Spanish and Italian versions. "Butterfly" sold over seven million copies internationally. Many other musicians recorded it, both in instrumental and vocal versions. In the US, that list included Eydie Gormé, Goldie Hawn and Eddy Arnold.

The single was No. 1 in Germany for fifteen weeks in summer 1971. It also reached No. 2 in South Africa. It reached #11 (and spent 12 weeks) in the UK Singles Chart in October 1971. Lack of further chart activity in the UK saw both singer and song branded as a one-hit wonder. It also appeared in the first compilation album put together specifically for telemarketing in the UK, K-Tel's 20 Dynamic Hits. It was a similar story in the U.S., where Gérard's single peaked at No. 78 in the Billboard Hot 100. In Australia Gérard's version peaked at No. 11 on the Go-Set National Top 40 singles chart in December 1971, with a cover version by local artist Matt Flinders peaking on the same chart a month later at No. 4. In Germany he had some more songs in the charts, such as "Isabella" and "Meine Stadt".

"Butterfly"
performed by Eydie Gormé in 1972

== Charts ==
| Chart (1971) | Peak position |
|---|---|
| Australian (Kent Music Report) | 10 |
| Canada (RPM) | 68 |
| New Zealand (Listener) | 7 |

== See also ==
- One-hit wonders in the UK
- List of best-selling singles in Germany
