= Vittorio De Seta =

Italian cinema director and screenwriter

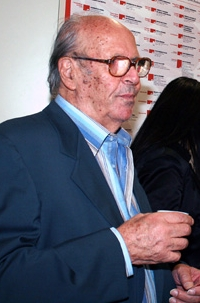
- De Seta in 2007
- Born: 15 October 1923; Palermo, Italy
- Died: 28 November 2011 (aged 88); Sellia Marina (Calabria), Italy
- Occupations: Film director, screenwriter
- Years active: 1954–2011

Vittorio De Seta (15 October 1923 – 28 November 2011) was an Italian filmmaker. Considered one of Italy's great imaginative realists of the 1960s, his films usually documented the country's everyday life.

He is most known for his Banditi a Orgosolo (1961), which incorporated the Italian neorealism with his previous documentary filmmaking background.

== Early life ==
He was born in Palermo, Sicily, to a wealthy family, and studied architecture in Rome, before deciding to become a director.

== Career ==
De Seta made ten short documentaries between 1954 and 1959, before directing his first feature-length film, Banditi a Orgosolo (Bandits of Orgosolo).

His early documentaries focus on the everyday life of many of Sicily's poorest workers, and are notable for their lack of voice-over narration, quiet mood, and striking color.

In 2005 the rediscovery of Vittorio De Seta's work was a highlight of Tribeca Film Festival and Full Frame Documentary Film Festival, where Détour De Seta, a documentary on the Italian director was presented.

== Filmography ==
- Banditi a Orgosolo (1961)
- Almost a Man (1966)
- L'invitata (1969)
- Diario di un maestro (1972) TV mini-series
- Un anno a Pietralata (1974) TV movie
- In Calabria (1993)
- Lettere dal Sahara (2006)
- articolo 23 (2008) Short

=== Documentaries ===
- Lu tempu di li pisci spata, 1954
- Isole di fuoco, 1954
- Surfarara, 1955
- Pasqua in Sicilia, 1955
- Contadini del mare, 1955
- Parabola d'oro, 1955
- Pescherecci, 1958
- Pastori di Orgosolo, 1958
- Un giorno in Barbagia, 1958
- I dimenticati, 1959
- In Calabria, 1993
- Dedicato ad Antonino Uccello, 2003

== Awards ==
- 1957. David di Donatello: Targa d'argento.
- 1961. Best First Work in the Venice Film Festival with Banditi a Orgosolo.
- 1962. Silver Ribbon of the Best Cinematography B/W at the Sindacato Nazionale Giornalisti Cinematografici Italiani (Italian National Syndicate of Film Journalists) with Banditi a Orgosolo.

== Bibliography ==
Bibliography

- Alessandro Rais (curated by). Il cinema di Vittorio De Seta. Catania, Giuseppe Maimone Editore, 1995. ISBN 88-7751-088-9
- Il mondo perduto: i cortometraggi di Vittorio De Seta. 1954-1959, book and DVD. Milan, Feltrinelli Editore, 2009. ISBN 978-88-07-74034-3
- Paolino Nappi. L'avventura del reale. Il cinema di Vittorio De Seta. Soveria Mannelli, Rubbettino, 2015. ISBN 978-88-498-4493-1
- Antioco Floris,Banditi a Orgosolo, il film di Vittorio de Seta, Cinema Focus, Rubbettino editore, Soveria Mannelli (Catanzaro) 2019.

Documentari

- Détour De Seta. Documentary film. Dir. Salvo Cuccia. Palomar-Endemol, 2004. 57 min.

== See also ==
- Il mondo perduto
