= Marie Laforêt =

French singer and actress (1939–2019)

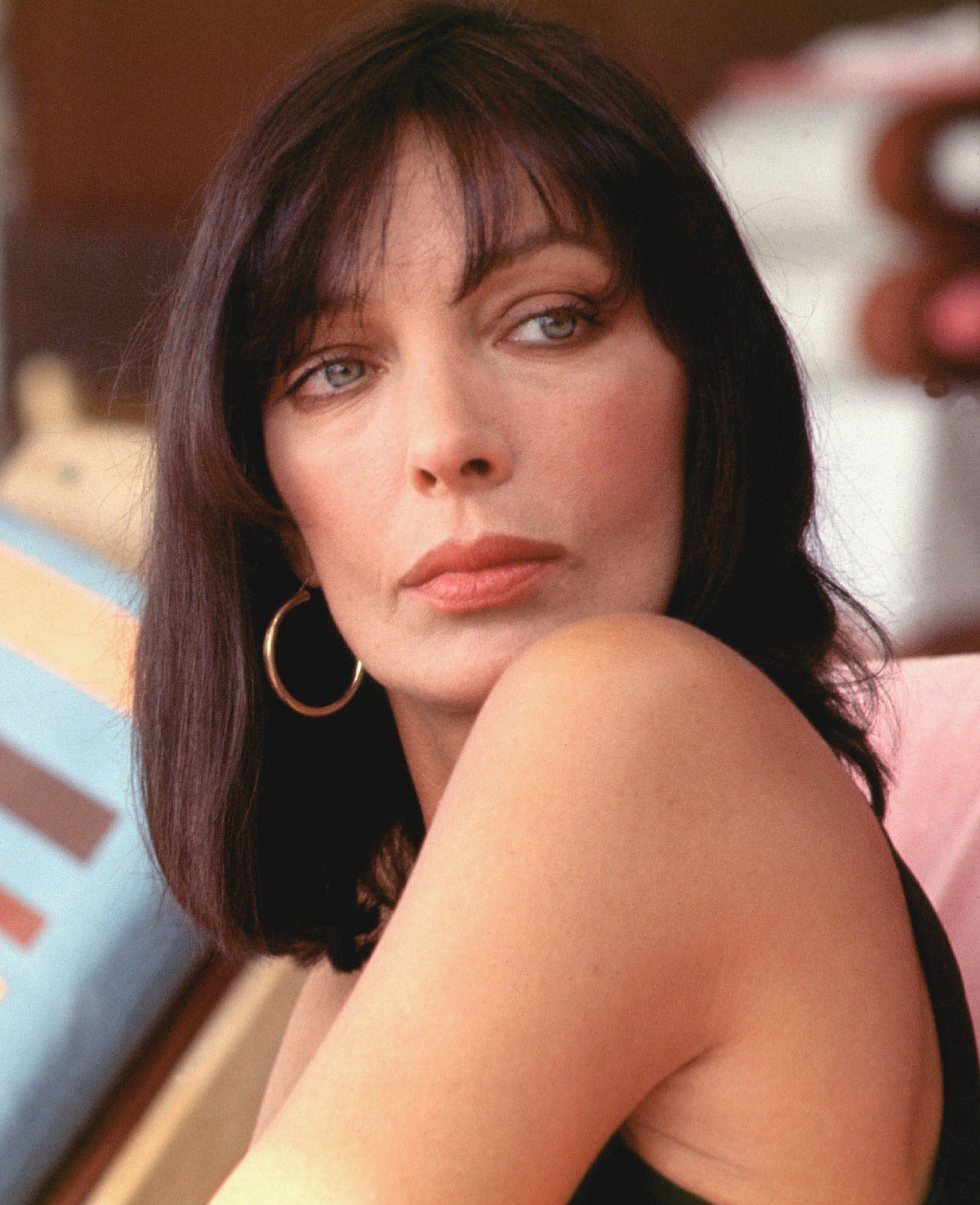
- Marie Laforêt in 1985
- Born: Maïtena Marie Brigitte Doumenach; 5 October 1939; Soulac-sur-Mer, France
- Died: 2 November 2019 (aged 80); Genolier, Switzerland
- Occupations: Singer; actress
- Spouse(s): Jean-Gabriel Albicocco (div.) Eric de Lavandeyra (m. 1984; div. 1995)
- Partner: Judas Azuelos
- Children: 3, including Lisa Azuelos

Marie Laforêt, born Maïtena Marie Brigitte Douménach (French: [maʁi lafɔʁɛ]; 5 October 1939 – 2 November 2019), was a French singer and actress, particularly well known for her work during the 1960s and 1970s. In 1978, she moved to Geneva, and acquired Swiss citizenship.

== Birth name ==
Her first name Maïtena, which is of Basque origin, means "beloved" and is sometimes used by the inhabitants of Languedoc, especially in the Pyrénées.

Douménach, her last name, is Catalan in origin – Domènec in Catalan. Her birth name and her repertoire, which included pieces inspired from world folklore, have led to speculation of an Armenian origin of her parents. The singer herself used to define herself sometimes as "ariégeoise", i.e. from the region of Ariège in the south of France.

== Early life and education ==
Marie Laforêt was born on 5 October 1939 at Soulac-sur-Mer, in the Médoc region of France, to Jean Doumenach and Marie-Louise (née Saint Guily). Her father's family were originally from Olette, a village in the Pyrénées Orientales on the border of Têt. Her father was an industrialist and served in the military in World War II. Her paternal great-grandfather, Louis Doumenach, headed a textile factory at Lavelanet in Ariège and her uncle, Charles-Joseph Doumenach, was a colonel and municipal counsellor. During the Second World War, Laforêt's father was a prisoner of war in Germany until the end of the war. At the age of three, Laforêt suffered a sexual trauma which affected her for a long time. During the war, the Doumenachs found shelter at Cahors and in Lavelanet. After the war, the family moved to Valenciennes where the father led a factory for railway utensils. Later they settled in Paris. After becoming more religious and having considered becoming a nun, Laforêt continued her secondary studies at the Lycee La Fontaine and Cours Raymond Rouleau in Paris. There she began to show interest for the dramatic arts and her first experiences in this domain proved to be therapeutically useful for her through their cathartic effect.

== Career ==
=== 1960s ===
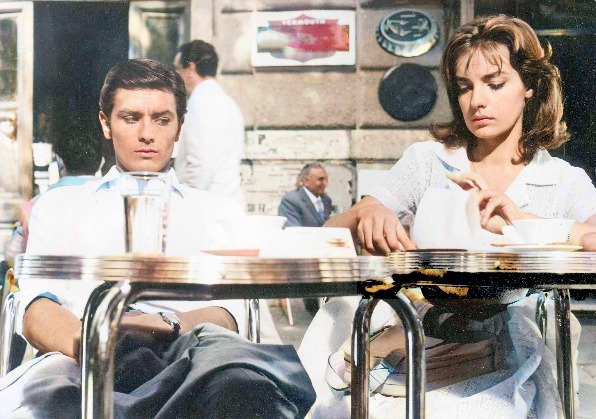
Alain Delon (as Tom Ripley) and Marie Laforêt (as Marge Duval) on the terrace of a café in Italy, during the shooting of the film Purple Noon by René Clément, in August 1959.

Her career began accidentally in 1959 when she replaced her sister at the last minute in the French radio talent contest Naissance d'une étoile (Birth of A Star) and won. Noticed then by Raymond Rouleau, she attended his theater classes as Director Louis Malle cast the young starlet in Liberté, the film he was shooting at the time but which he finally abandoned. Therefore, Laforêt first notably appeared onscreen opposite actor Alain Delon in René Clément's 1960 drama Plein Soleil (Purple Noon).

After this opportunities came to her rapidly. The original soundtrack of her second film, 1961's Saint Tropez Blues, where she sang the title song accompanied by her childhood friend Jacques Higelin at the guitar was released in 1960. Her first musical hit was 1963's Les Vendanges de l'Amour.

In 1961 her new husband, director Jean-Gabriel Albicocco, cast her in La Fille aux Yeux d'Or (The Girl with the Golden Eyes) based on the Balzac story, the source of her nickname, and in 1963 cast her Le Rat d'Amérique, based on the Jacques Lanzmann 1956 novel of the same name. She gained hit "Manchester Et Liverpool" in 1966.

=== 1970s ===
By the end of the 1960s Laforêt had become a rather distinctive figure in the French pop scene. Her songs offered a more mature, poetic, tender alternative to the light, teenage yé-yé tunes charting in France at the time. Her melodies borrowed more from exotic folk music, especially South American and Eastern European, than from contemporary American and British pop acts. Her music stood out, perhaps too much for her new label CBS Records, which favored upbeat, simple songs. She was interested in making more personal records but finally gave in. Although her most financially successful singles ("Viens, Viens", a cover of the German hit ″Rain Rain Rain″, and "Il a neigé sur Yesterday", a ballad about the break-up of the Beatles) were released in the 1970s, Laforêt progressively lost interest in her singing career, moving to Geneva, Switzerland in 1978 where she opened an art gallery and abandoned music for the time being. Laforêt had worked with many important French composers, musicians and lyricists, such as André Popp and Pierre Cour, who provided her with a panoply of colorful, sophisticated orchestral arrangements, featuring dozens of musical instruments and creating a variety of sounds, sometimes almost Medieval, Renaissance or Baroque, other times quite modern and innovative.

=== 1980 to 2019 ===
In the 1980s, Laforêt concentrated on her acting career, appearing in a few French and Italian films. Some music singles were eventually released, but were not popular. She made a comeback however in 1993 with her final album, for which she wrote the lyrics. In the 1990s she again continued to work as an actress both on screen and on stage. She performed in a number of plays in Paris over the years, acclaimed by audiences and critics alike. In September 2005, she sang once again, touring in France for the first time since 1972. Every concert sold out. Laforêt resided in Geneva and obtained Swiss citizenship.

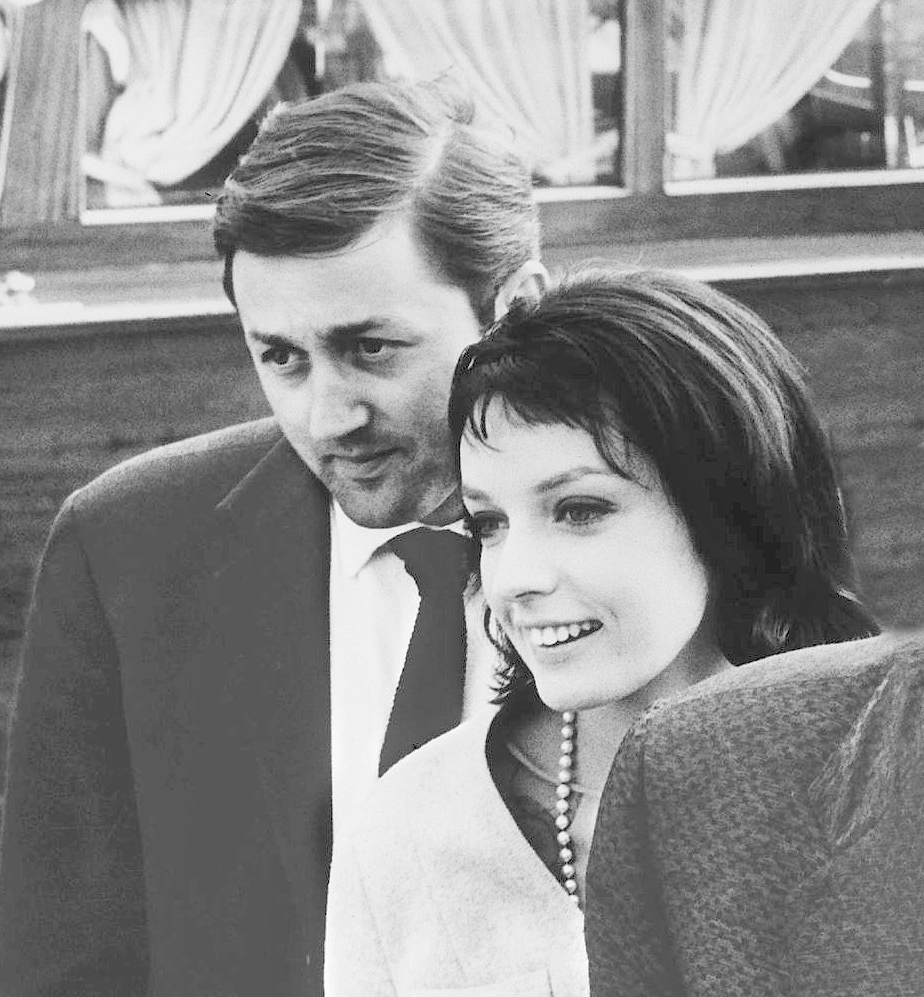
LaForêt and Jean-Gabriel Albicocco present La Fille Au Yeux D'Or at the Venice Festiva, 1961.

== Personal life ==
Laforêt married director Jean-Gabriel Albicoco on 9 November 1961, and the couple divorced, in 1963. She next was romantically linked with Judas Azuelos beginning in 1965, the same year their daughter Élise (Lisa) was born. Lisa Azuelos would later become a French director, writer, and producer who made a film about another famous French singer, Dalida, in 2016. Lisa's brother Jean-Mehdi was born in 1967, the year their parents parted ways. LaForêt next married Alain Kahn-Sriber in 1971 and her third child, Eve-Marie-Deborah, was born in 1974. The couple divorced two years later. After being disillusioned by the music industry at the time, Laforêt moved to Switzerland where she was married to Swiss doctor Pierre Meyer in 1981 for a year. On 7 September 1990, she married Eric de Lavandeyra, a stockbroker, for two years. This last marriage ended in a publicly contentious divorce.

== Death ==
Marie Laforêt died on 2 November 2019 in Genolier, Switzerland, a small town in the Nyon district near Geneva, from the consequences of a primary bone cancer. She was 80 years old. Her funeral took place in Paris, at the church on Saint-Eustache, on 24 November; followed by the burial in the family crypt at the Père-Lachaise Cemetery.

== Recordings ==
=== Folk music ===
Laforêt helped popularize the Bob Dylan song "Blowin' in the Wind" in France with her 1963 interpretation. The B-side of the same EP covered the 1964 Animals version of the folk ballad "House of the Rising Sun". Her other folk recordings include: "Viens sur la montagne", a 1964 French adaptation of the African-American spiritual "Go Tell It on the Mountain" recorded by American folk trio Peter, Paul and Mary the previous year; "Coule doux" ("Hush-a-Bye"), another Peter, Paul and Mary song; 1966's "Sur les chemins des Andes", a French version of the traditional Peruvian "El Cóndor Pasa"; and "La voix du silence", a 1966 cover of American duo Simon and Garfunkel's "The Sound of Silence".

=== Rock music ===
She also recorded some rock songs in the 1960s, her most famous being Marie-douceur, Marie-colère, a 1966 cover with different lyrics (contrafactum) of the Rolling Stones hit Paint It Black. Another popular recording was 1965's girl group-style A demain, my darling, known by English-speakers as The Sha La La Song written by Marianne Faithfull on her debut eponymous album.

=== Pop music ===
Some of her most memorable pop songs are those written or arranged by French composer André Popp, such as Entre toi et moi, L'amour en fleurs, Les noces de campagne, Mon amour, mon ami, and Manchester et Liverpool. The melody of the latter song gained fame in the former Soviet Union as the background music to the Vremya television news programme's weather forecast in the 1970s.

=== Other music ===
The quiet, bittersweet and minimally arranged ballad Je voudrais tant que tu comprennes (1966), composed by Francis Lai, is Laforêt's favorite. Homage was paid to the song in the 1980s, when French pop superstar Mylène Farmer added it to her own concert repertoire.

The 1973 hit "Viens, viens" was a cover version of a German song "Rain, Rain, Rain" performed by Simon Butterfly.

Laforêt's 1977 hit "Il a neigé sur Yesterday", perhaps her most well-known recording, was penned by musician Jean-Claude Petit, and lyricist Michel Jourdan, (famous for his work with Dalida, Nana Mouskouri, Michel Fugain and Mike Brant) and who had written the words for earlier Laforêt songs, such as "Les vendanges de l'amour" and "L'orage".

== Dramatic roles ==
=== Theater ===
Year	Title	Author	Director	Venue	Note
1969	La Hobereaute	Jacques Audiberti	Georges Vitaly	Hôtel de Béthune-Sully	Performed as part of the Festival du Marais
1973	Partage de midi	Paul Claudel	G. H. Régnier	Bourges theater	Role: Isé
1992	L'Écorce bleue	Marguerite Yourcenar	None	Open Air theater	A reading done as part of the Carpentras Festival
1997	Vietnam	Marguerite Duras	None	Saint-Florent-le-Vieil festival	A reading accompanied by the Ca Tru Thai Ha ensemble from Hanoi
1997	Master Class	Terrence McNally	Roman Polanski	Théâtre de la Porte-Saint-Martin	Role: Maria Callas
1999	Master Class	Terrence McNally	Didier Long	Antoine theater	Role: Maria Callas
2000	Master Class	Terrence McNally		Opéra-Comique	command performances, 18 and 30 April 2000
2003	La presse est unanime	Laurent Ruquier	Agnès Boury	Théâtre des Variétés	
2004	Jésus-la-Caille	Francis Carco	Jacques Darcy	Espace Cardin	
2008	Master Class	Terrence McNally	Didier Long	Théâtre de Paris	Role: Marie Callas
2009	L'Hirondelle inattendue	Simon Laks		Théâtre Toursky, Forbidden Music Festival, Marseille	Role: Reciter

=== Cinema ===
Year	Title	Role	Director	Notes
1960	Purple Noon	Marge Duval	René Clément	
1961	Saint-Tropez Blues	Anne-Marie	Marcel Moussy	
1961	The Girl with the Golden Eyes	the girl	Jean-Gabriel Albicocco	(segment "Les comédiennes")
1961	Famous Love Affairs	Madame Georges	Michel Boisrond	
1961	Dark Journey	Angèle	Léonard Keigel	
1963	Because, Because of a Woman	Agathe	Michel Deville	
1963	Rat Trap	Maria	Jean-Gabriel Albicocco	
1964	Cherchez l'idole		Michel Boisrond	Uncredited
1964	Male Hunt	Gisèle	Édouard Molinaro	
1965	Cent briques et des tuiles	Ida	Pierre Grimblat	
1965	The Camp Followers	Eftikia	Valerio Zurlini	
1965	Marie-Chantal contre le docteur Kha	Marie-Chantal	Claude Chabrol	
1967	Le Treizième Caprice	Fanny	Roger Boussinot	
1967	Jack of Diamonds	Olga Vodkine	Don Taylor	
1972	Le Petit Poucet (Tom Thumb)	the queen	Michel Boisrond	
1979	Cop or Hood	Edmonde Puget-Rostand	Georges Lautner	
1982	Les Diplômés du dernier rang	Dominique	Christian Gion	
1982	fr:Que les gros salaires lèvent le doigt !	Rose, Joeuf's wife	Denys Granier-Deferre	Uncredited
1984	Les Morfalous	Hélène Laroche-Fréon	Henri Verneuil	
1984	Happy Easter	Sophie Margelle	Georges Lautner	
1985	Le Pactole	Greta Rousselet	Jean-Pierre Mocky	
1985	Tangos, the Exile of Gardel	Mariana	Fernando Solanas	
1987	Sale destin	Marthe Marboni	Sylvain Madigan	
1987	Fucking Fernand	Lotte	Gérard Mordillat	
1987	Il est génial papy !	Louise	Michel Drach	
1989	La folle journée ou Le mariage de Figaro	La comtesse	Roger Coggio	
1990	The Miser	Contessa Isabella Spinosi	Tonino Cervi	
1990	Présumé dangereux	Thea	Georges Lautner	
1990	Una fredda mattina di maggio		Vittorio Sindoni	
1992	Who Wants to Kill Sara?	Sara's mother	Gianpaolo Tescari	
1995	Ainsi soient-elles	Mère de Marie	Patrick Alessandrin and Lisa Azuelos	
1995	Dis-moi oui...	Mme Villiers	Alexandre Arcady	
1996	Tykho Moon	Éva	Enki Bilal	
1997	Desert of Fire	Rama	Enzo G. Castellari	3 episodes
1997	Héroïnes	Sylvie	Gérard Krawczyk	
1997	Love, Math and Sex	Pétra la vérité / Theatre Actress in red dress	Charlotte Silvera	
2000	Jeux pour mourir		Bruno Romy	
2008	Les Bureaux de Dieu	Martine	Claire Simon	

=== Television ===
Year	Title	Role	Director	Genre
1961	Le Rouge et le Noir	Mathile De La Mole	Pierre Cardinal	Television movie
1965	La redevance du fantôme	Miss Diamond	Robert Enrico	Television movie
1972	Kean: Un roi de théâtre	Comtesse Elena de Kloefeld	Marcel Moussy	Television movie
1984	Emmenez-moi au théâtre	Pauline	André Flédérick	Television series
1987	La Mafia 3 (La Piovra 3)	Anna Antinari	Luigi Perelli	Television series
1988	Le loufiat	la star	Michel Boisrond	Television miniseries
1989	Isabella la ladra (original title: La Bugiarda)	Elvira	Franco Giraldi	Television miniseries
1990	L'affaire Rodani (Quattro piccole donne)	la mère des quatre filles	Gianfranco Albano	Television series
1992	Un cane sciolto 3	Hélène	Giorgio Capitani	Television movie
1994	A che punto è la notte?	Chantal Guidi	Nanni Loy	Television movie
1995	Adrien Le Sage: Ma fille est impossible	Comtesse de Pontigny	Jacques Monnet	Television movie
1996	L'histoire du Samedi	Françoise	Bernard Uzan	Television series
1997	Le Désert de feu (Desierte di fuoco)	Rahma	Enzo G. Castellari	Television movie
1998	Jeudi 12	Françoise Gamelin	Patrick Vidal	Television series
1998	Villa Vanille	Pronia	Jean Sagols	Television movie

== Discography ==
Studio Albums

- 1964 : Viens sur la montagne
- 1965 : La Fleur sans nom
- 1967 : Manchester et Liverpool
- 1968 : Le Lit de Lola
- 1968 : Que calor la vida
- 1969 : Le Vin de l'été
- 1970 : Portrait
- 1972 : Ay tu me plais
- 1973 : Pourquoi les Hommes pleurent ?
- 1974 : Noé
- 1976 : La Vérité
- 1977 : Il reviendra
- 1979 : Moi je voyage
- 1993 : Reconnaissances (Une Musique)

Live Albums

- 1970 : Récital
- 1998 : Voyage au long cours

Spanish Albums

- 1964 : Y Volvamos al Amor
- 1965 : Entre Tú y Yo
- 1968 : Qué Calor la Vida
- 1969 : Mon amour, mon ami

Italian Albums

- 1964 : La Cantante Dagli Occhi d'Oro

Portuguese Albums

- 1967 : Sôbre a Montanha

1960s singles and EPs

- 1960 : Saint-Tropez Blues / Tumbleweed
- 1963 : Tu fais semblant – Les vendanges de l'amour / Mary Ann – Les jeunes filles
- 1963 : Blowin' in the Wind – Flora / House of the Rising Sun – Banks on the Ohio
- 1963 : Au coeur de l'automne – L'amour en fleurs / Qu'est-ce qui fait pleurer les filles – Mais si loin de moi
- 1963 : La vendemmia dell'amore – E giusto / Una noia senza fine – Che male c'e
- 1964 : Viens sur la montagne – Les noces de campagne / Un amour qui s'éteint – L'amour qu'il fera demain
- 1964 : La tendresse – La plage / Après toi qui sait – L'arbre qui pleure
- 1965 : Katy cruelle – Entre toi et moi / La bague au doigt – Ma chanson faite pour toi
- 1965 : Ah ! Dites, dites – Julie Crèvecoeur / Viens – À demain my darling
- 1965 : La plage / Après toi, qui sait
- 1966 : La voix du silence (The Sound of Silence) – Siffle, siffle ma fille / Je t'attends – L'orage
- 1966 : Marie-douceur, Marie-colère (Paint It Black) – Toi qui dors / Je voudrais tant que tu comprennes – La moisson
- 1966 : Manchester et Liverpool – Pourquoi ces nuages / Prenons le temps – Sur les chemins des Andes
- 1966 : Mon amour, mon ami – Sébastien / Je suis folle de vous – Mon village au fond de l'eau
- 1967 : Ivan, Boris et moi – Je ne peux rien promettre / Pour celui qui viendra – Tom
- 1968 : Le lit de Lola – Qu'y-a-t-il de changé / Et si je t'aime – A la gare de Manhattan
- 1968 : El polo – L'air que tu jouais pour moi / Le tengo rabia al silencio – House of the rising sun
- 1968 : Que calor la vida – Mais mon coeur est vide / La valse des petits chiens blancs – Requiem pour trois mariages
- 1969 : Au printemps – Roselyne / Feuilles d'or – D'être à vous
- 1969 : Pour une étoile – Ton coeur sauvage / Vin de l'été – En plus de l'amour
- 1969 : Ah ! Si mon moine – On n'oublie jamais / Tourne, tourne – La fleur sans nom
- 1969 : Tu es laide / Toi, nos enfants et moi

1960s LPs

- 1964 : Marie Laforêt
- 1965 : Marie Laforêt Vol. 2
- 1967 : Marie Laforêt Vol. 3
- 1968 : Marie Laforêt Vol. 4
- 1968 : Que calor la vida
- 1969 : Marie Laforêt Vol. 6
- 1970 : Marie Laforêt Vol. 7

== Publications ==
- 1981 : Contes et légendes de ma vie privée (ISBN 978-2-234-01349-0)
- 2001 : Mes petites magies, livre de recettes pour devenir jeune (ISBN 978-2-84098-648-5)
- 2008 : Sous le pseudonyme d'Erna Huili-Collins. Ouvrage collectif Correspondances intempestives : à la folie... pas du tout, Triartis
- 2020 : Nous n'avons pas d'autre choix que de croire (ISBN 978-2-7499-4478-4)

== See also ==
- Lisa Azuelos

== Additional sources ==
- Pierre Fageolle & Egon Kragel, Marie Laforêt, éd. ... Car rien n'a d'importance, 1994
- Pierre Saka, Yann Plougastel (dir.), La Chanson française et francophone, at the Internet Archive, Guide Totem, Larousse/HER, 1999 (ISBN 2-03-511346-62-03-511346-6)
- Alain Wodrascka, Marie Laforêt - La femme aux cent visages, éd. L'Étoile du Sud, 1999
- Alain Wodrascka, Marie Laforêt - Portrait d'une star libre, éd. Didier Carpentier, 2009 (ISBN 978-2-84167-612-5)
- Alain Wodrascka, Marie Laforêt - long courrier vers l'aurore, Mustang éditions, préface de Nilda Fernandez, 2014
