= Danyel Gérard =

French pop singer and composer (born 1939)

Danyel Gerard
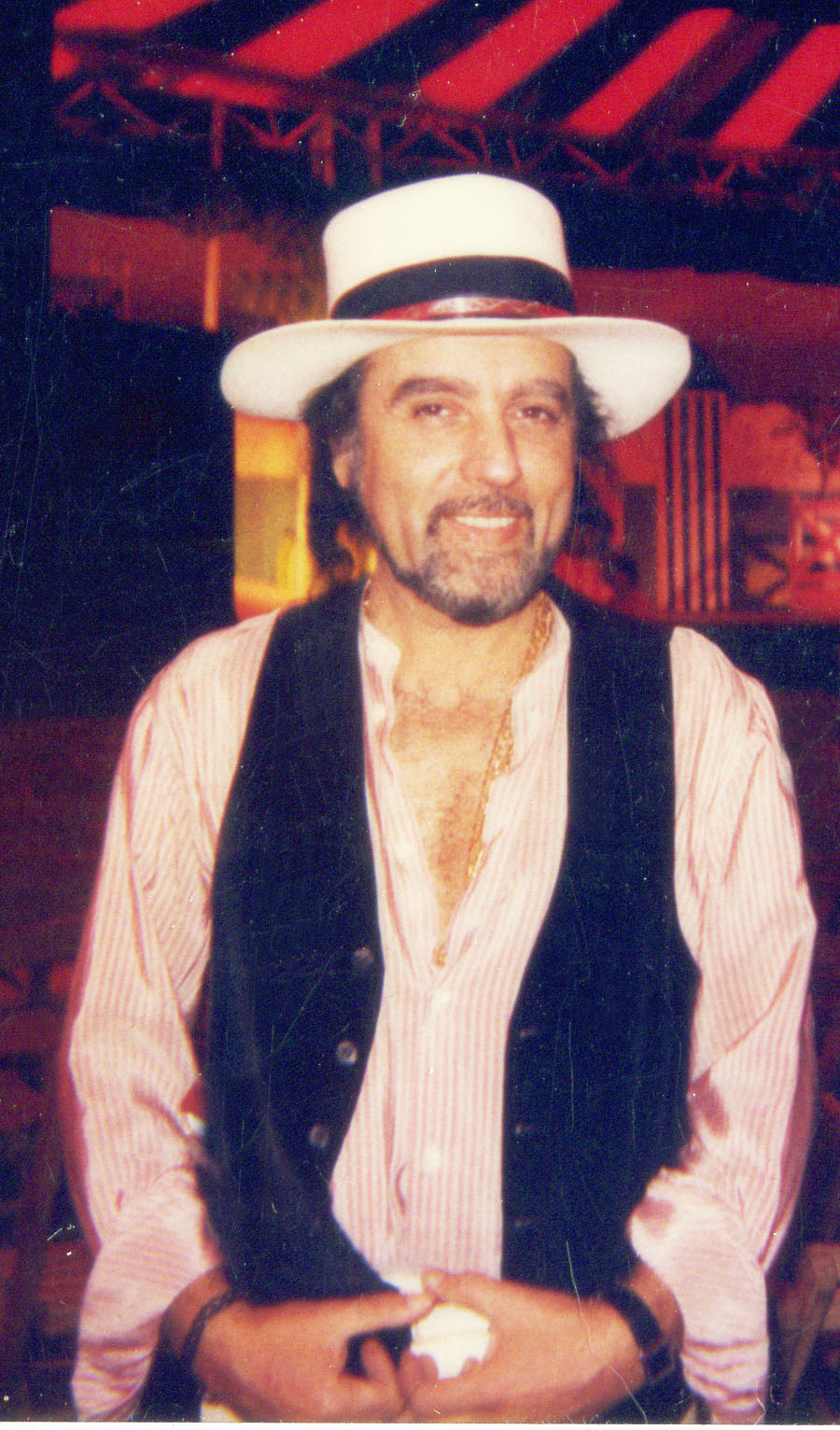
- Danyel Gerard in 1983

Background information
- Born: Gérard Daniel Kherlakian; 7 March 1939 (age 87); Paris, France
- Genres: French pop; rock and roll
- Occupations: Singer, composer

Danyel Gérard (born Gérard Daniel Kherlakian; 7 March 1939) is a French pop singer and composer.

== Life and work ==
Gérard was born in Paris, France to an Armenian father and a Corsican mother, but grew up mainly in Rio de Janeiro, in Brazil. In 1953, he returned to Paris and became a choir boy at Notre Dame. Following this he played in the rock and roll band The Dangers. In 1958 he made his first recordings: "Viens" (a cover of the Kalin Twins' hit "When") and "D'où reviens-tu Billy Boy" (adapted from Dorothy Collins' "Where Have You Been, Billy Boy"), making one of the first young French singers to successfully sing rock and roll (his only rivals at this stage were Richard Anthony, Claude Piron (later better known as Danny Boy) and Gabriel Dalar), although his commercial impact was very limited; despite a latter-day, revisionist recasting of him as the French Elvis Presley, he was nevertheless one of France's first rock stars.

After cutting a further EP featuring a cover of Don Gibson's "Oh Lonesome Me" ("O pauvre moi") which was buried by a rival version by Sacha Distel and an adaptation of the Fraternity Brothers' "Passion Flower" ("Tout l'amour"), he was drafted and spent 1959 to 1961 stationed in North Africa. Subsequently, he was a singer and guitarist in various bistros. On his return, he resumed his singing career with the minor 1961 hit "Oh Marie-Line" but by then he had been overtaken by newer singers such as Johnny Hallyday. He also began to write songs, penning tunes for Johnny Hallyday, Sylvie Vartan, Dalida, Richard Anthony, German-based star Caterina Valente, actress Marie Laforêt and Austrian singer Udo Jürgens.

After enjoying a major hit with the French version of Pat Boone's "Speedy Gonzales" ("Le petit Gonzalès"), despite competition from a version by Dalida, in 1963 he became to the first signing to the new Disc AZ label, issuing two further EPs for them before unleashing his best recording of the period, a revival of Chuck Berry's "Memphis, Tennessee". Further hits followed but by the mid-sixties his star had waned and he moved into record production, most notably for Michel Corringe. He returned in 1970 with the French hit "Même un clown" but his international breakthrough came in 1971 with "Butterfly", which he recorded in several languages and which has sold seven million copies. It charted across Europe, reaching #1 in Germany, Switzerland, Sweden, and France, #5 in the Netherlands, #10 in the UK and #2 in South Africa; in the US it peaked at #78. It was awarded a gold disc by the Recording Industry Association of America. It has since become a pop standard, and was also used in the film The Mad Aunts Strike Out.

After this brief success, he enjoyed several other European hits, including "Ti-laï-laï-laï (l'armenien)", which reflected his Armenian roots, but he never again recorded anything with the same impact as his breakthrough hit. Among the more interesting recordings from this period are his "Atmosphère" album, which included both "Butterfly" and the funky groover "Sexologie", and the follow-up, logically titled "Atmosphère 2", which featured the hit "D'Amérique au coeur du Japon", as well as the late seventies' "Gone With the Wind" album, which housed the nostalgic "Les temps changent". Alongside his own recordings, he continued to dedicate himself to composing music for other artists.

Gérard made a comeback to the live scene with a concert at the Paris Olympia theatre on 20 November 1978. The concert was a sell-out and included a 21-piece band and orchestra conducted by French composer and trumpeter, Yvan Julien. A full troupe of circus performers joined Gérard on stage for the finale. Anton Karas also performed his composition "Harry Lime Theme" from the film, The Third Man.

Gérard enjoyed a further major hit in the French pop charts with "Mélodie mélodie", taken from his 1978 album of the same name. This led to various television and radio appearances in France and Germany. Following the Paris Olympia concert, he took the nucleus of the orchestra and formed a seven-piece band, Horde, with which he played a number of shows in Paris and the south of France in 1978 and 1979. He continued to record into the eighties before retiring into the shadows to enjoy the benefits of his not inconsiderable royalties.

== See also ==
- List of best-selling singles
- List of French singers
- List of number-one hits of 1971 (Germany)
- List of one-hit wonders on the UK Singles Chart
