= Passage Pommeraye =

Shopping mall in central Nantes, France

Coordinates: 47°12′48″N 1°33′35″W

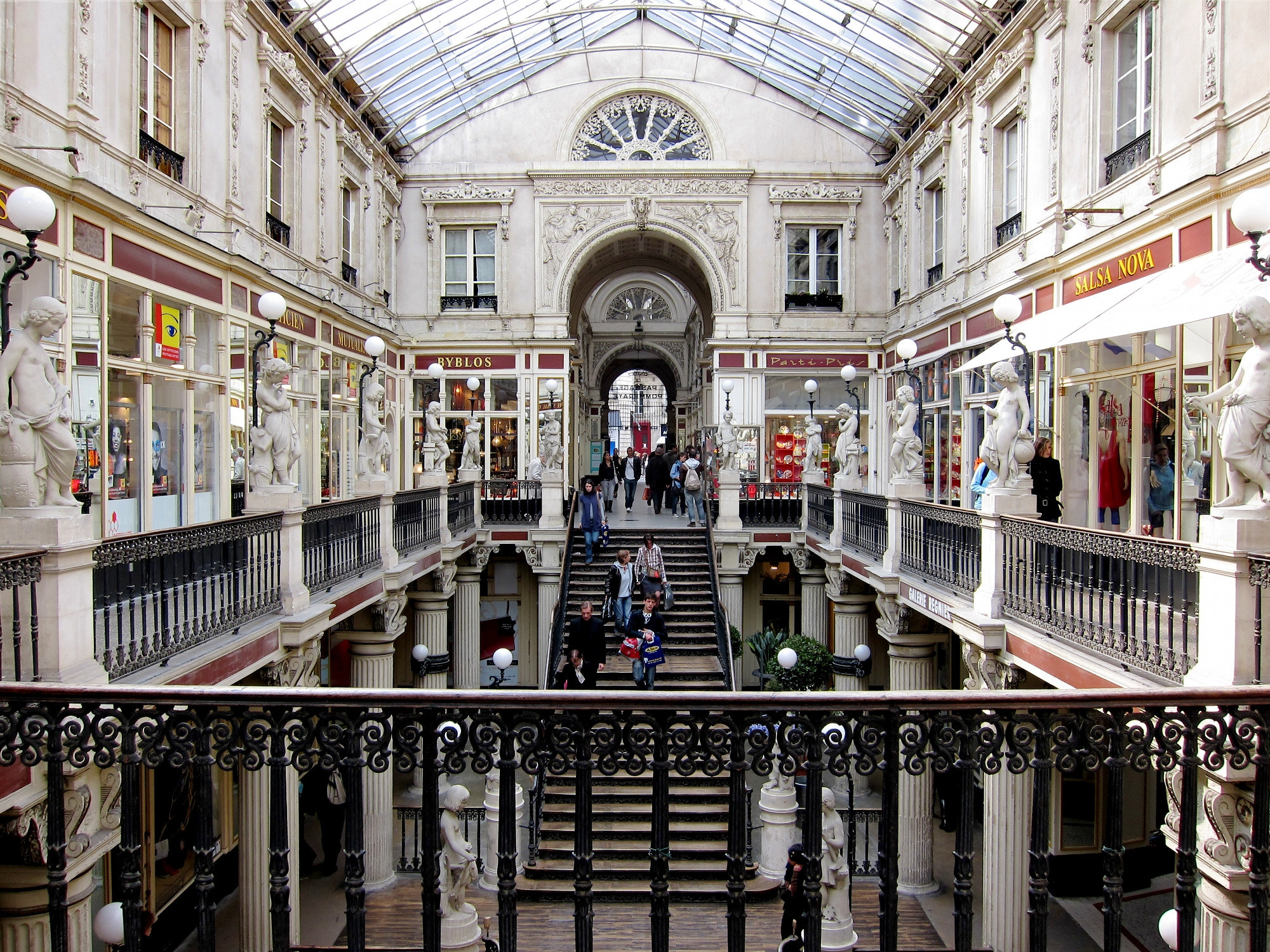
Passage Pommeraye, Nantes

The Passage Pommeraye (Breton: Tremen Pommeraye) is a small shopping arcade in central Nantes, France, named after its property developer, Louis Pommeraye. Construction started at the end of 1840 and was completed on 4 July 1843. The Passage Pommeraye is a passage between two streets, the rue Santeuil and rue de la Fosse, with one 9.40 m higher than the other. Midway, there is a flight of steps and the mall then continues on another floor. Two architects, Jean-Baptiste Buron and Hippolyte Durand Gasselin, contributed to its design, which is very elaborate and includes renaissance style sculptures.

The Passage Pommeraye has been classified as a historic monument since 1976.

== Movies ==
The Passage Pommeraye can be seen in several movies :

- Lola by director Jacques Demy.
- Une chambre en ville by director Jacques Demy.
- Les Parapluies de Cherbourg by director Jacques Demy.
- La reine blanche by director Jean-Loup Huber.
- Jacquot de Nantes by director Agnès Varda (Jacques Demy's wife]

== Sources ==
- (in French), accessed on 10 November 2005

== Photos ==
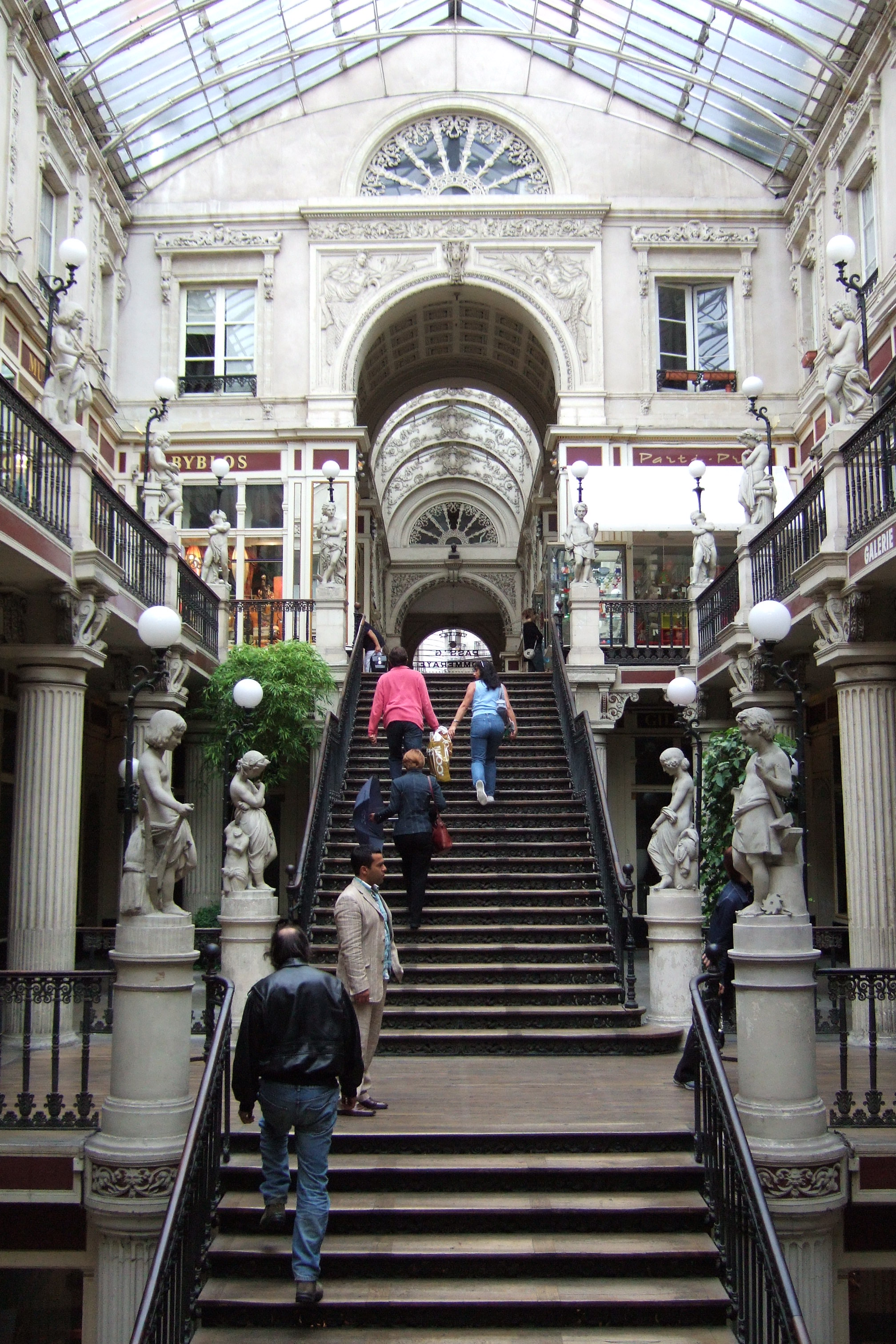
Passage Pommeraye, Nantes

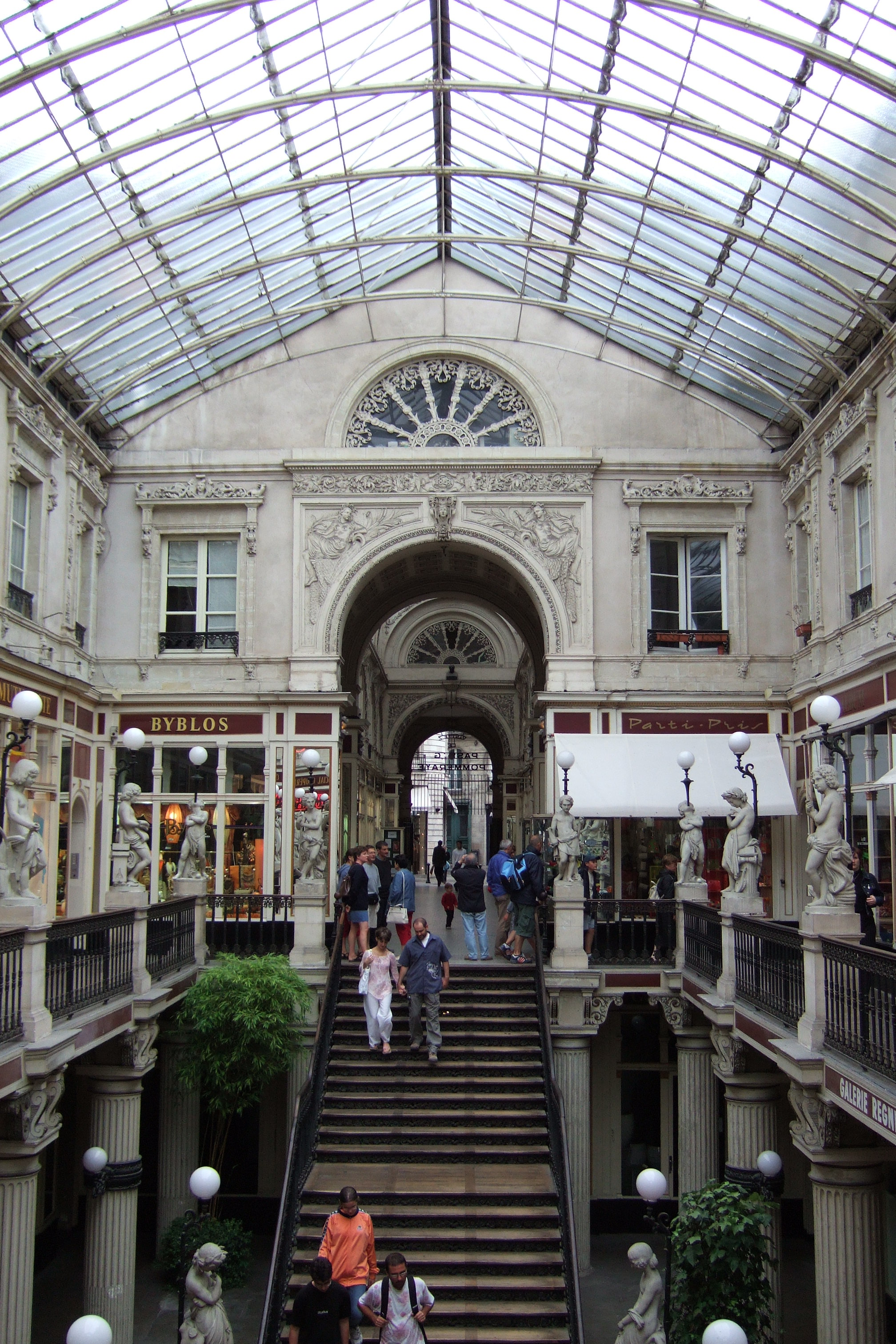
Passage Pommeraye, Nantes

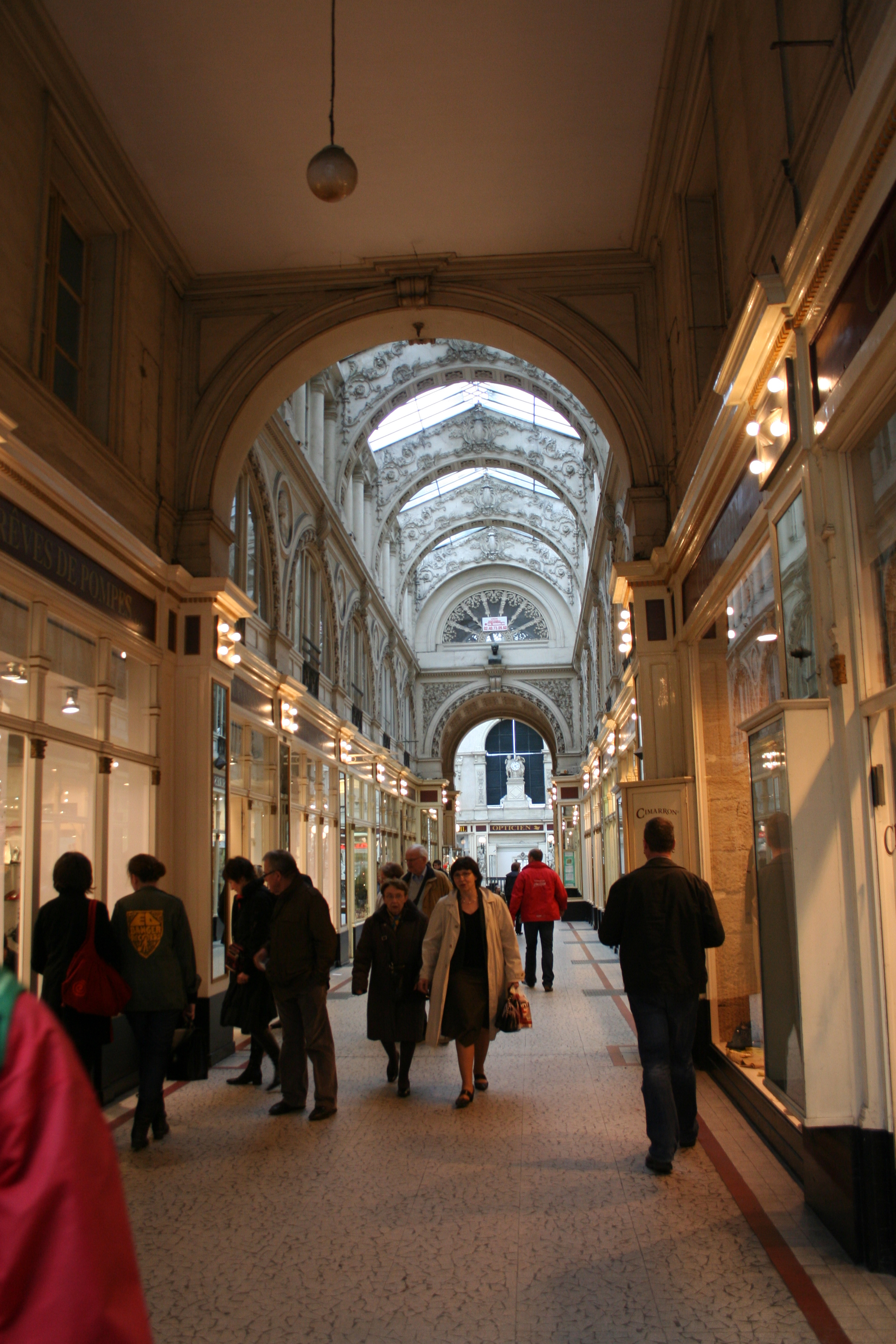

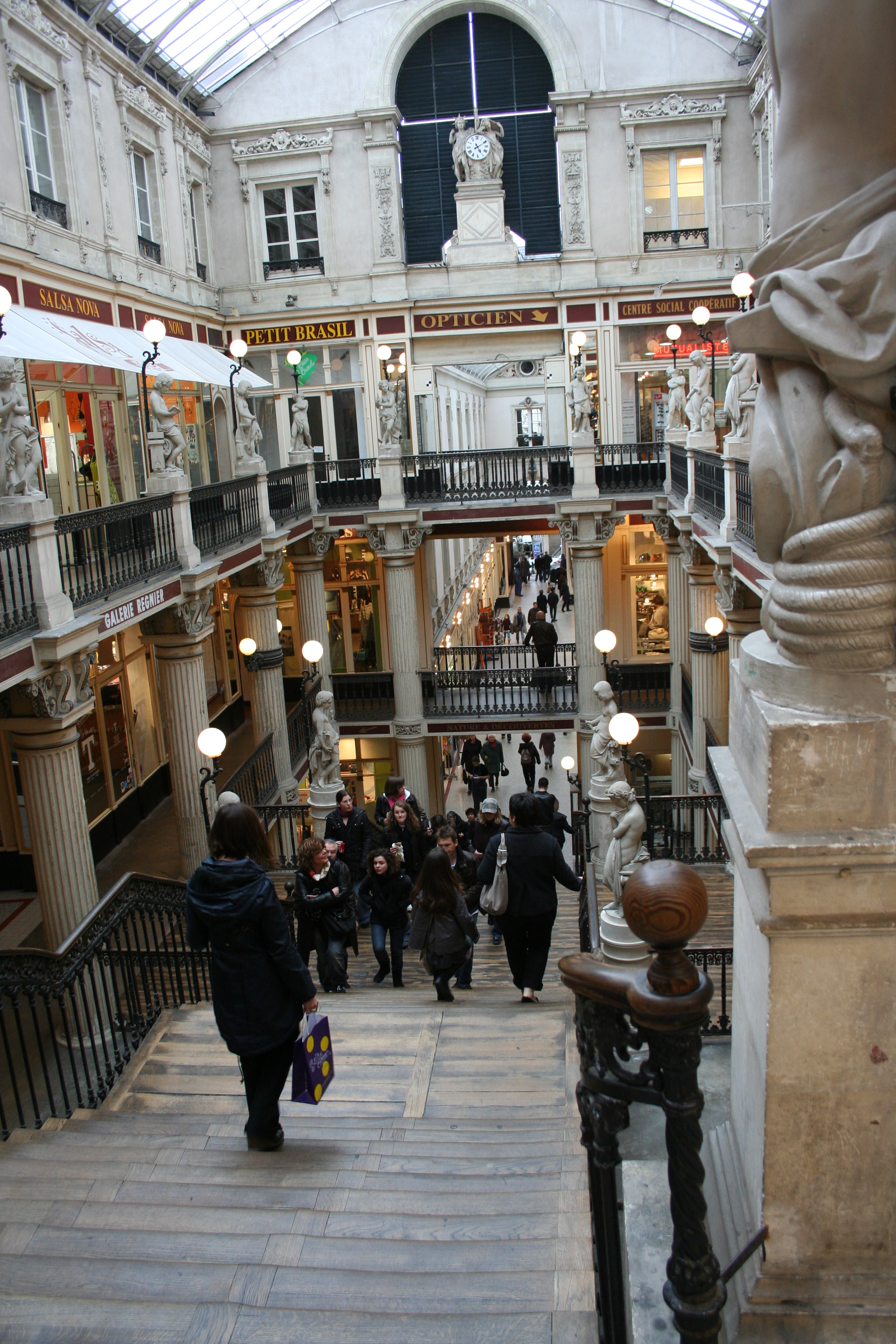

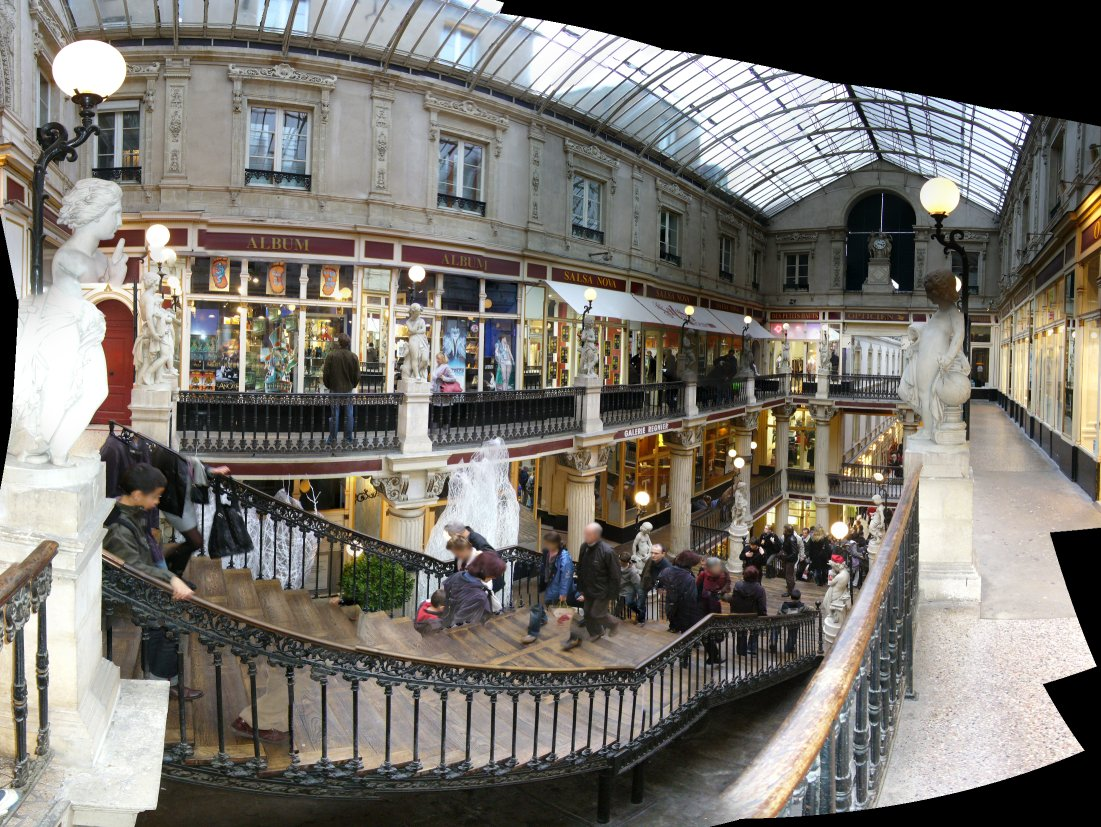
Passage Pommeraye, Nantes
