= The Last Torch Song =

1957 film by Juan de Orduña

- Spanish theatrical release poster
- Spanish: El último cuplé
- Directed by: Juan de Orduña
- Written by: Jesús María de Arozamena; Antonio Mas Guindal
- Produced by: Juan de Orduña
- Starring: Sara Montiel; Armando Calvo; Enrique Vera; Julia Martínez; Alfredo Mayo; Matilde Muñoz Sampedro; José Moreno
- Cinematography: José F. Aguayo
- Edited by: Antonio Cánovas
- Music by: Juan Solano
- Color process: Eastmancolor
- Production company: Producciones Orduña Films
- Distributed by: Cifesa
- Release date: 6 May 1957
- Running time: 110 minutes
- Country: Spain
- Language: Spanish

The Last Torch Song, better known under its Spanish title El último cuplé, is a 1957 Spanish jukebox musical film directed by Juan de Orduña and starring Sara Montiel, Armando Calvo and Enrique Vera.

It was released in Spain on 6 May 1957. It was immensely popular domestically and it had a wide international release making it the worldwide highest-grossing Spanish-language film made up to that point. The film's soundtrack album had also a wide international release.

== Cast ==
- Sara Montiel as Maria Luján
- Armando Calvo as Juan Contreras
- Enrique Vera as Pepe Molina
- Julia Martínez as Trini
- Matilde Muñoz Sampedro as Paca
- Alfredo Mayo as Gran Duque Vladimir de Rusia
- José Moreno as Cándido Chamorro
- Laly del Amo as Luisa
- Aurora García Alonso
- Beni Moreno as Chole
- Luis Orduña
- Erasmo Pascual as Don Praxeres
- Consuelo de Nieva as Gloria Palacios
- Miguel Fleta
- Manolita Guerrero
- Antonio Alcázar
- Rafaela Aparicio as Singer
- Emilio Alonso
- Salvador Garrido
- Juan Monfort
- Francisco Mario de Bustos
- José María Caffarel as Monsieur Dupois - Empresario de París
- Luis Muñoz
- Manuel Gómez
- Florentina Garcia
- Clotilde Gijón
- Lola Gómez Moreno
- Juan Parera
- José María Cases
- Rafael Tamarit
- Toni Fernández as Mari Chamorro
- Mercedes Monterrey
- Guadalupe Muñoz Sampedro

== Production ==
The filming took place in Barcelona between November 1956 and January 1957. Montiel accepted to star in the film as a deference to its director Juan de Orduña and during a vacation in Spain in between her Hollywood filmings Serenade and Run of the Arrow. The film was filmed with a very low budget. Initially, the songs in the film were going to be sung by a professional singer who would dub Montiel, but due to the low budget, she eventually sang the songs herself. Orduña had to sell the distribution rights to Cifesa to finance the completion of the filming.

== Release ==
The Last Torch Song opened on 6 May 1957 in Spain. The film was running at the 1,400-seat Rialto Theatre for forty-seven weeks, making it the highest grossing film in Madrid in the 1950s. (Note: Back then in Spain, boxoffice grosses were a secret kept by exhibitors for tax reasons. The only guide to estimate them was the length of the first-run and the capacity of the venue. It was not made mandatory to officially communicate the number of tickets sold until 1 January 1965.) The film was there for so long that, as a result of the rain and the wind, the large billboard announcing the film had to be replaced by another, something unusual in the history of film exhibition in Spain. The film soundtrack album also became a hit.

The film had a wide international release with the dialogues dubbed or subtitled into other languages in non-Spanish speaking countries, while the songs kept in their original version. It was the worldwide highest-grossing Spanish-language film made up to that point, only surpassed in the 1950s–60s by her next film The Violet Seller, and catapulting Montiel's career as an actress and a singer.

== Bibliography ==
- Labanyi, Jo & Pavlović, Tatjana. A Companion to Spanish Cinema. John Wiley & Sons, 2012.
