= Desperate Mission =

(The) Desperate Mission may refer to:

- Desperate Mission (1965 film), a 1965 Italian-Spanish-French Eurospy film
- The Desperate Mission (1969 film), a 1969 American television film
