= Green Harvest =

Green Harvest may refer to:

- Green harvest
- Green Harvest (1959 film), a French war drama film
- Green Harvest (1961 film), a Spanish film
