= Marc Michel =

Swiss actor

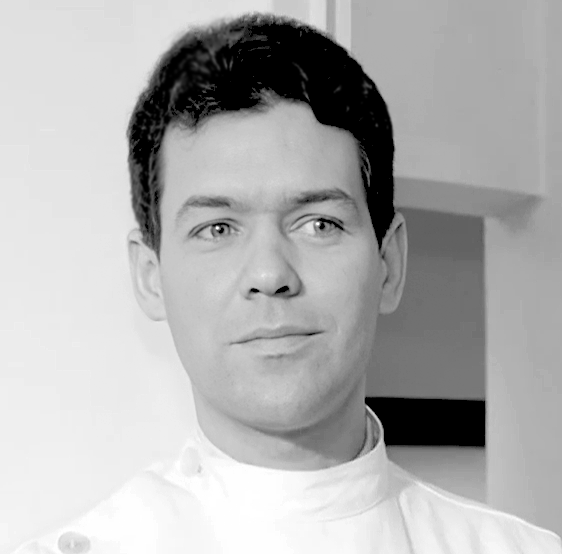
- Born: February 10, 1929; Basse-Terre, Guadeloupe
- Died: 3 November 2016 (aged 87); Dreux, Eure-et-Loir, France
- Occupation: Actor
- Years active: 1955-2016

Marc Michel (February 10, 1929 – 3 November 2016) was a French-Swiss actor. He appeared in more than fifty films.

He is best known for his roles in three seminal French films of the 1960s: Jacques Becker's Le Trou (1960), and two films by Jacques Demy: Lola (1961) and The Umbrellas of Cherbourg (1964). In both Demy films, he played the same role, Roland Cassard, a lovesick writer and jeweler.

== Filmography ==
Year	Title	Role	Notes
1955	Sophie et le crime		Uncredited
1955	Les premiers outrages	Le jeune marié	
1960	The Hole	Claude Gaspard	
1961	Lola	Roland Cassard	Main male protagonist
1963	Blague dans le coin	Bob, l'électricien	
1964	La ragazza di Bube	Stefano	
1964	The Umbrellas of Cherbourg	Roland Cassard	Supporting role
1964	El señor de La Salle	Andrés	
1965	Samba	Paulo	
1965	Six Days a Week	Arturo Santini	
1965	Su e giù	Baldovino Uberti	(segment " Il Colpo Del Leone")
1967	Five Ashore in Singapore	Captain Kevin Gray	
1968	Captain Singrid	Vignal	
1969	The Pleasure Pit	Marss	
1970	The Mad Heart	L'acteur	
1973	Il n'y a pas de fumée sans feu	Jean-Paul Leroy	
1974	Les divorcés	L'amant de Jacqueline	
1977	The French Woman	Hugo	
1983	Un dimanche de flic	Charlie	
1998	Sucre amer	Nolivos	
2001	Papa je crack		
2004	1802, l'épopée guadeloupéenne		
2004	Cracking Up	Frank Cardonat	
2011	Tout est encore possible	president Basto	
2012	Summer in Provence	Tom Washington	
