= The Lovely Lola =

1962 film by Alfonso Balcázar

- Directed by: Alfonso Balcázar
- Written by: Alexandre Dumas fils (novel); Jesús María de Arozamena; Miguel Cussó; José María Palacio
- Starring: Sara Montiel; Antonio Cifariello; Frank Villard
- Cinematography: Mario Montuori
- Edited by: Teresa Alcocer
- Music by: Gregorio García Segura; Ernesto Lecuona
- Production companies: Balcázar Producciones Cinematográficas; FICIT; Intercontinental Productions
- Release date: 6 September 1962
- Running time: 111 minutes
- Country: Spain
- Language: Spanish

The Lovely Lola (Spanish:La bella Lola) is a 1962 historical musical film directed by Alfonso Balcázar and starring Sara Montiel, Antonio Cifariello and Frank Villard. It was made as a co-production between France, Italy and Spain. It is based on the 1848 novel The Lady of the Camellias by Alexandre Dumas fils.

== Cast ==
- Sara Montiel as Lola
- Antonio Cifariello as Javier
- Frank Villard as Gabriel
- Luisa Mattioli as Ana
- Germán Cobos as Federico
- Laura Nucci as Madre de Javier
- José María Caffarel as Empresario
- Gustavo Re as Comisario
- Roberto Martín as Teniente
- Josep Maria Angelat
- Fernando Ulloa as Doctor
- Antonio de Armenteras
- Jesús Puche
- Vicente Vega
- Luis Ciges as Abogado

== Bibliography ==
- Phil Powrie. Carmen on Film: A Cultural History. Indiana University Press, 2007.
