= Sara Montiel =

Spanish actress and singer (1928–2013)

The Most Excellent Sara Montiel
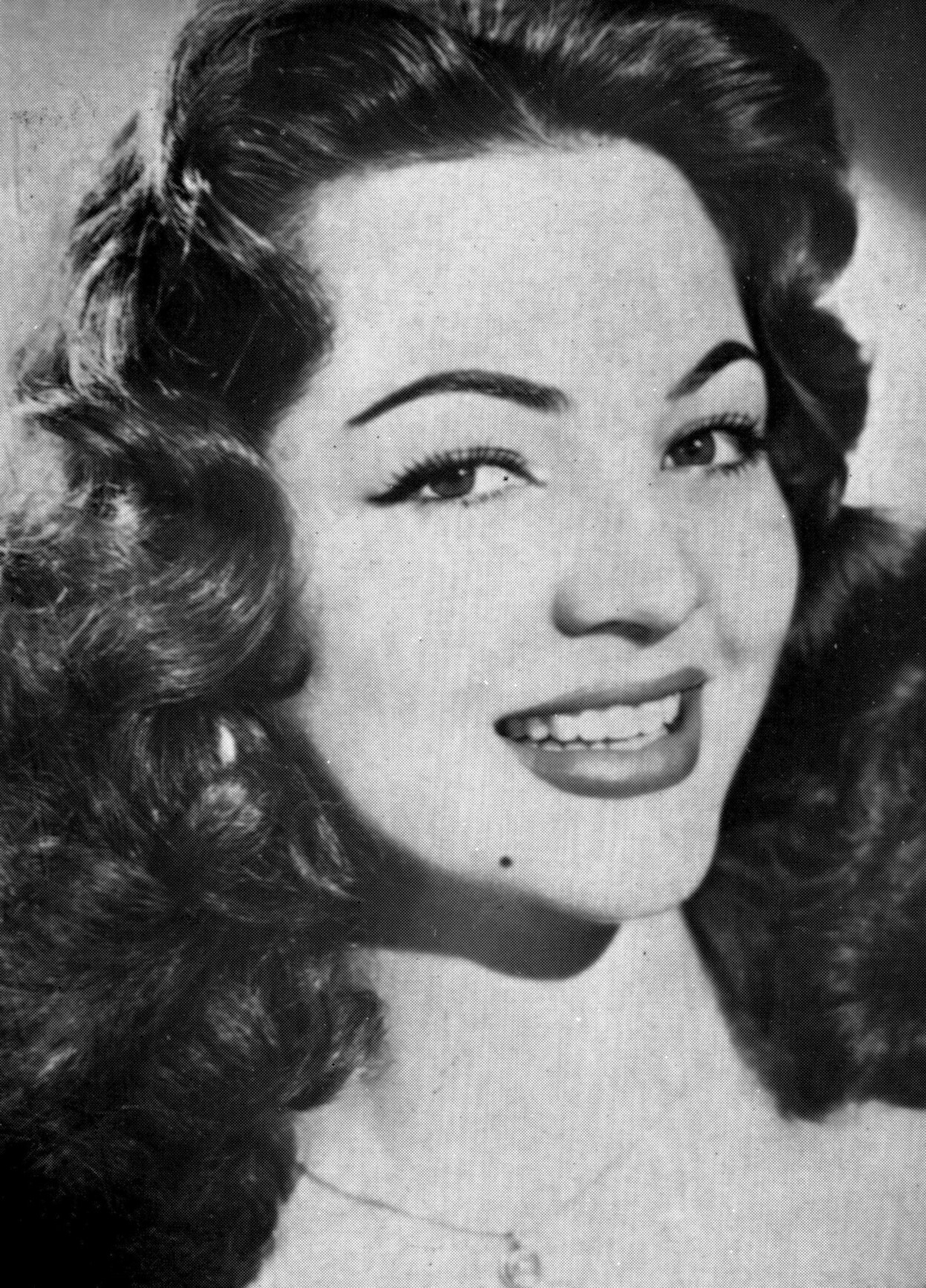
- Montiel in 1954
- Born: María Antonia Alejandra Vicenta Elpidia Isidora Abad Fernández; 10 March 1928; Campo de Criptana, Ciudad Real, Spain
- Died: 8 April 2013 (aged 85); Madrid, Spain
- Other names: María Alejandra; Sarita Montiel
- Occupations: Actress; Singer
- Years active: 1943–2013
- Spouses: Anthony Mann (m. 1957; div. 1963); José Vicente Ramírez Olalla (m. 1964; div. 1970); José Tous Barberán (m. 1979; died 1992); Antonio Hernández (m. 2002; div. 2005)
- Children: Thais Tous Abad; José Zeus Tous Abad

María Antonia Abad Fernández (10 March 1928 – 8 April 2013), known professionally as Sara Montiel, also Sarita Montiel, was a Spanish actress and singer. She began her career in the 1940s and became the most internationally popular and highest paid star of Spanish cinema in the 1960s. She appeared in nearly fifty films and recorded around 500 songs in five different languages.

Montiel was born in Campo de Criptana in the region of La Mancha in 1928. She began her acting career in Spain starring in films such as Don Quixote (1947) and Madness for Love (1948). She moved to Mexico where she starred in films such as Women's Prison (1951) and Red Fury (1951) during the Golden Age of Mexican Cinema. She then moved to the United States and worked in three Hollywood English-language films Vera Cruz (1954), Serenade (1956) and Run of the Arrow (1957). She returned to Spain to star in the musical films The Last Torch Song (1957) and The Violet Seller (1958). These two films netted the highest gross revenues ever recorded internationally for films made in the Spanish-speaking movie industry during the 1950s/60s and made her immensely popular. She then established herself also as a singer thanks to the songs she performed in her films and combined filming new musical films, recording songs and performing live.

Throughout her career, Montiel's personal life was the subject of constant media attention in the Spanish-speaking world. She was married four times and adopted two children.

== Career ==
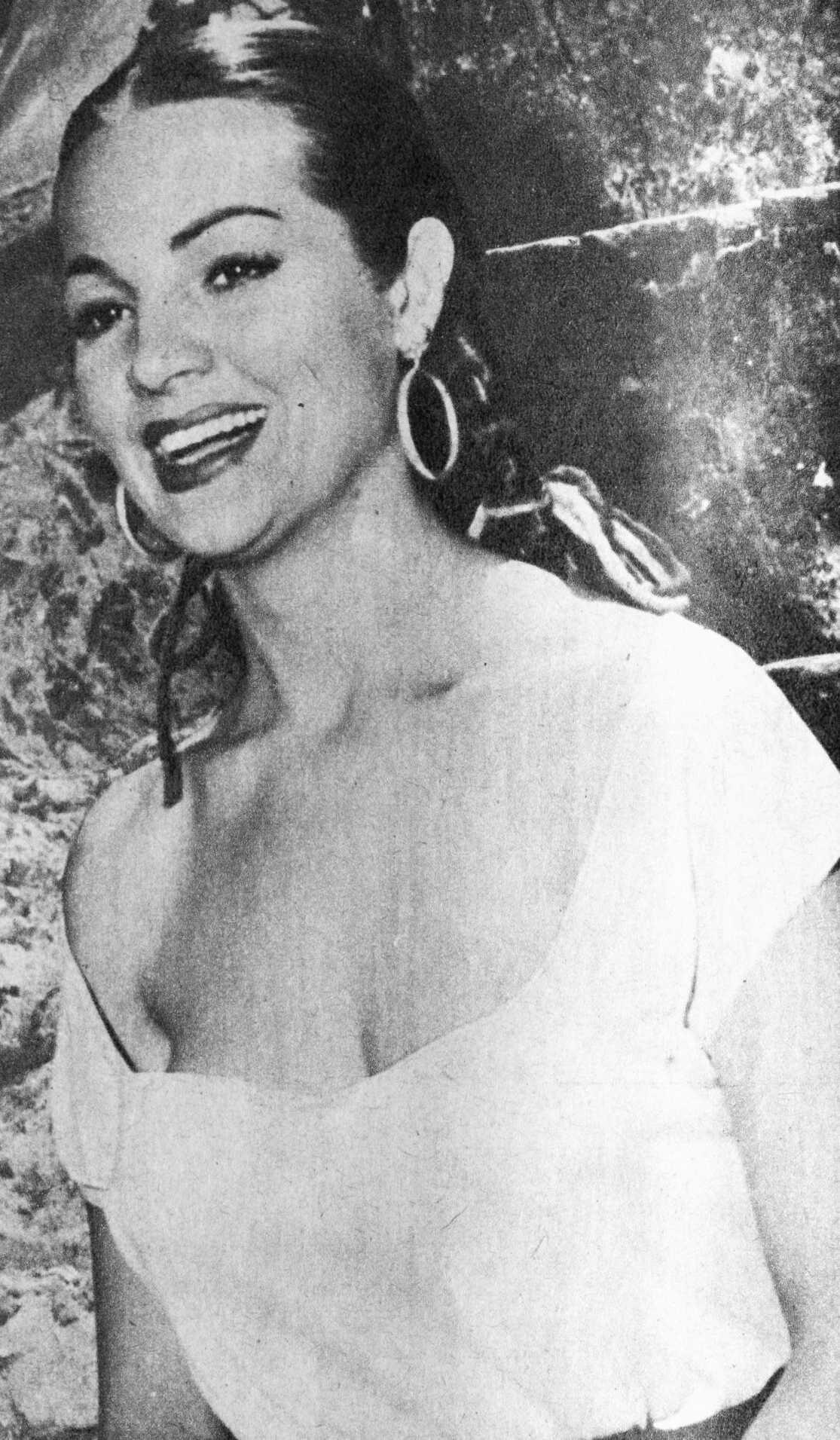
Sara Montiel in 1951

Montiel started in movies at sixteen in her native Spain, where she appeared in a secondary role in her first movie, Te quiero para mí (I want you for myself) in 1944, immediately followed by a leading role in Empezó en boda (It Began with a Wedding) also in 1944. They were followed by roles in films such as Mariona Rebull (1946), Don Quixote (1947) and Madness for Love (1948). In April 1950, accompanied by her mother, she moved to Mexico and starred in a dozen films there in less than five years, including Women's Prison (1951), Red Fury (1951) and Cinnamon Skin (1953).

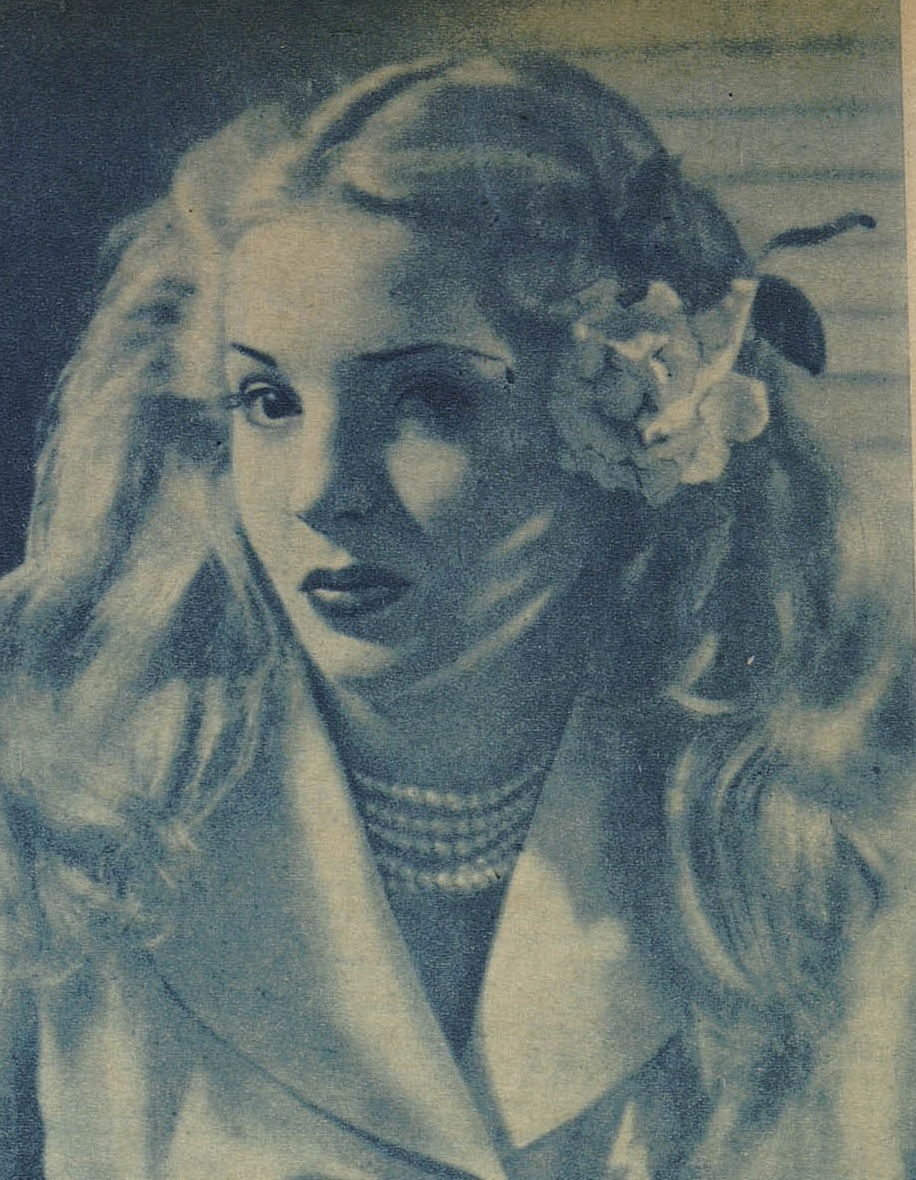
Montiel, early in her career before rising to international stardom (1945).

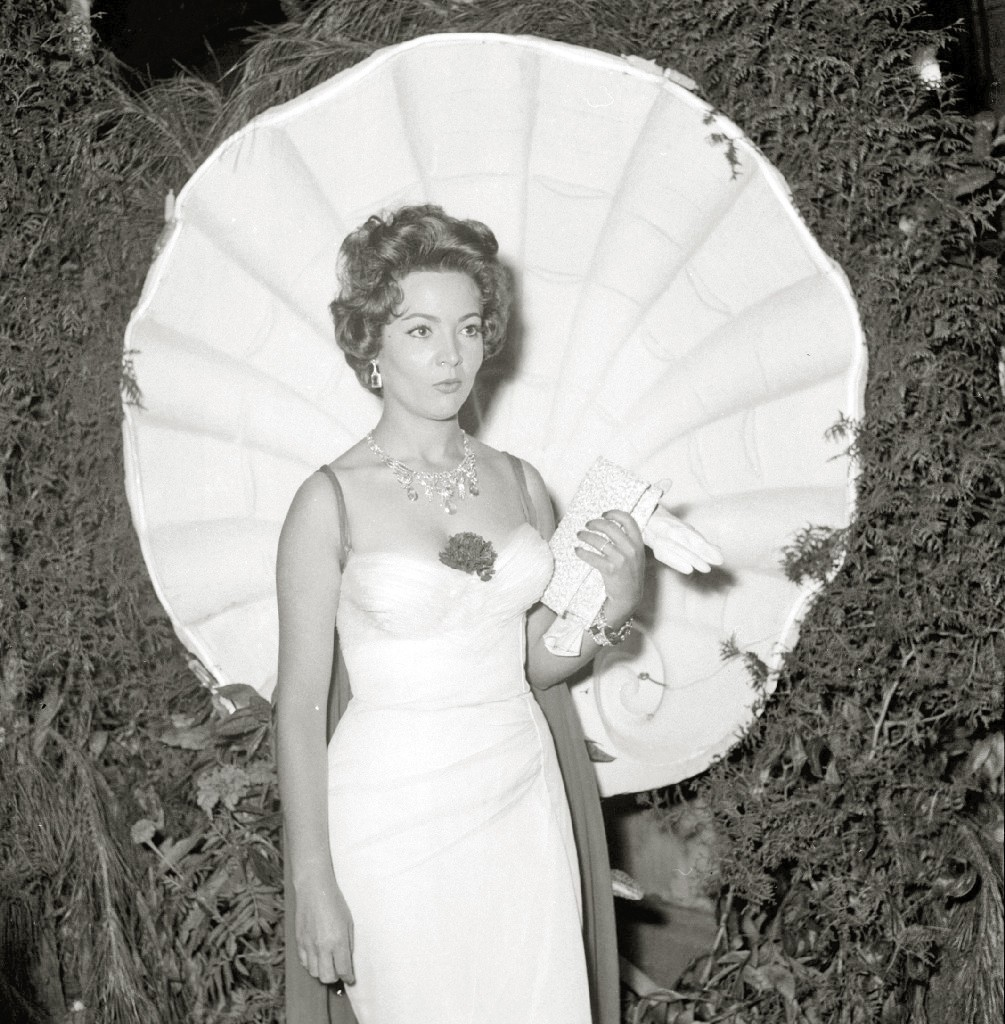
Montiel attending the San Sebastián International Film Week (1956).

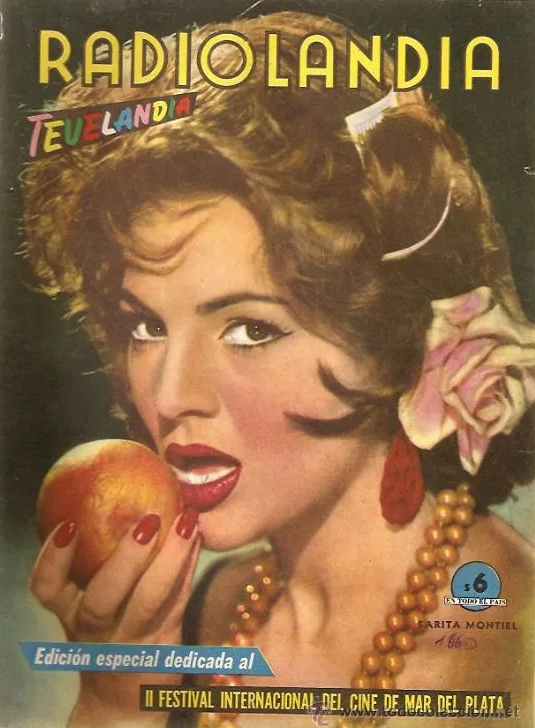
Cover of Radiolandia magazine, showcasing Montiel's iconic style (1960).

Hollywood came calling afterwards, and she was introduced to United States moviegoers in the film Vera Cruz (1954), directed by Robert Aldrich. She was offered the standard seven-year contract at Columbia Pictures, which she refused, afraid of Hollywood's typecasting policies for Spaniards. Instead she freelanced at Warner Bros. in Serenade (1956), directed by Anthony Mann, whom she married in 1957, and at RKO in Samuel Fuller's Run of the Arrow (1957).

Between November 1956 and January 1957, before filming Run of the Arrow, she filmed in Barcelona the musical film The Last Torch Song during a vacation in Spain and as a deference to its director Juan de Orduña. The film, that was filmed with a very low budget, became unexpectedly a worldwide megahit. Initially, the songs in the film were going to be sung by a professional singer who would dub Montiel, but due to the low budget, she eventually sang the songs herself. The film soundtrack album also became a hit.

Following this success, in June 1957 she signed with producer Benito Perojo a lavish contract to make four films in three years, being the first of them The Violet Seller, a 1958 large-budget international co-production musical film. The economic agreement was ten million pesetas^{[a]} (US$240,000 as of 1957)^{[b]} for four films, which means that she was to receive 2.5 million pesetas (US$60,000) per film, making her the highest-paid Spanish star at a time when the highest-paid stars were netting one million pesetas (US$24,000) per film. The success of The Violet Seller surpassed that of The Last Torch Song, and in a contractual dispute for the next film, A Girl Against Napoleon (1959), the agreement was improved by securing for her the twenty per cent of the producer's net revenue. She also signed a contract with Hispavox to record and release the soundtrack albums of her films for which she netted the ten per cent of the records sale as royalties. The Violet Seller soundtrack album, the first with them, topped sales in Spain and in Latin America and, in July 1959, Hispavox served a Golden Disk award to her for the number of records sold there.

All this made her a film and singing international superstar. Almost all of her next films earned high box office results and she combined filming, recording songs and performing live. She was the highest paid star of Spanish cinema, and many years later, she began to say that she had been paid more than US$1 million for each of these films, something that the press widely reported as the actual figure. Among the next films during the 1960s and early 1970s were My Last Tango (1960), Pecado de amor (1961), The Lovely Lola (a 1962 version of La Dame aux Camélias), Casablanca, Nest of Spies (1963), Samba (1964), The Lost Woman (1966), Tuset Street (1967), Esa mujer (1969) and Variety (1971). The film Variety was banned in Beijing in 1973.

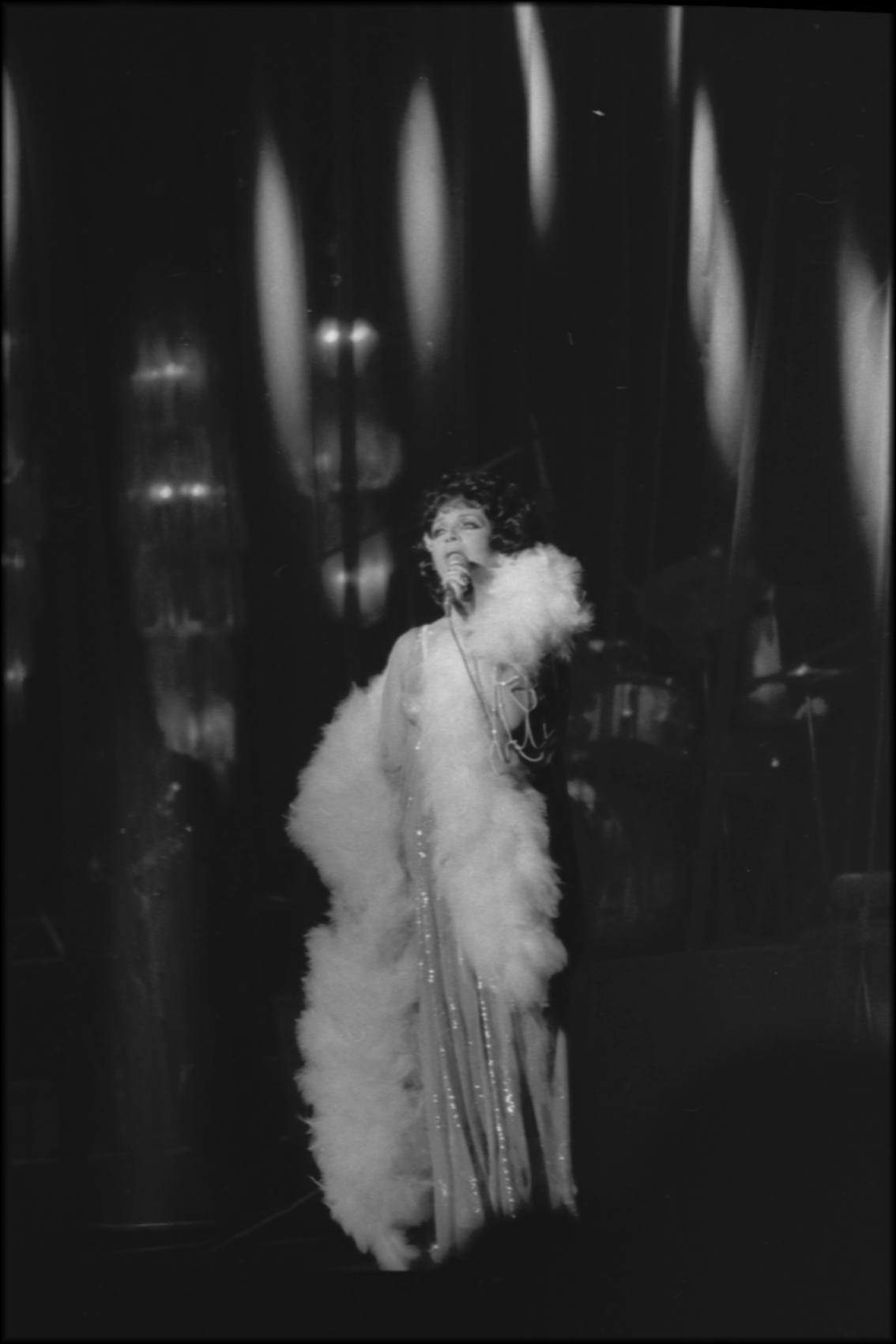
Montiel performing at Teatre Victòria, Barcelona (1980).

In 1974, she announced her retirement from movies, as she become dissatisfied with the movie industry and the overt nudity in films, but continued performing live, recording and starring on her own variety television shows in Spain. In 2002 she was the advertising image of the MTV Europe Music Awards held in Barcelona.

In November 2009, singer Alaska who forms the Spanish pop group Fangoria with Nacho Canut, invited Montiel to record a track sharing vocals with her for the re-release of the band's album Absolutamente. They recorded the title track "Absolutamente" as a duet. The music video for the song was released on 18 December 2009. Well into her eighties, she had no plans to retire, and continued working in various projects. In May 2011, after almost forty years without making a movie, she performed in a feature film directed by Óscar Parra de Carrizosa. The film title is Abrázame and was shot on location in La Mancha.

She is considered "one of the most important actresses in the history of Spain", and has been described by Spain's press as a "myth of Spanish cinema." She has also been characterized as "the most beautiful woman of twentieth century Spain." She has also been called a "sexual, feminist, and gay icon for Francoist Spain."

== Personal life ==
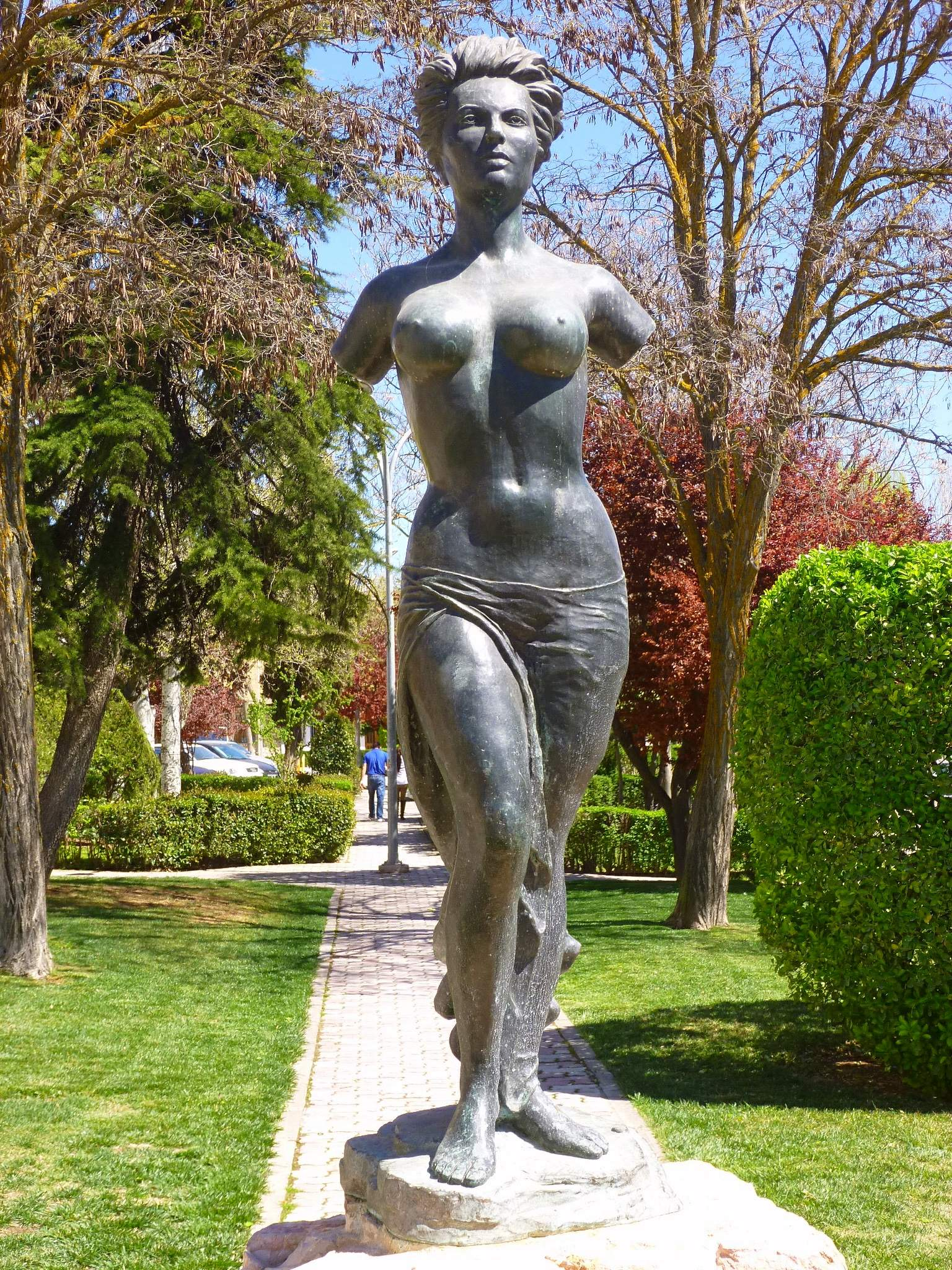
Monument to Montiel in Campo de Criptana.

Montiel, whose complete name was María Antonia Alejandra Vicenta Elpidia Isidora Abad Fernández, was born in 1928 in Campo de Criptana (Ciudad Real), Spain. She entered films after winning a talent contest at age fifteen. In her first movie, she was credited as "María Alejandra" a shortened version of her real name. For her next film, she changed her name to Sara, after her grandmother, and Montiel after the Montiel fields in La Mancha region of her birth. It was in Mexico where she first learned how to read and write, taught by the poet León Felipe, and in 1951 she acquired Mexican dual nationality. She was married four times, and was excommunicated by the Catholic Church in Spain for the civil-wedding ceremony of her first marriage:

- Anthony Mann (American actor, film director); 1957–63 (divorced)
- José Vicente Ramírez Olalla (attorney); 1964–70 (divorced)
- José Tous Barberán (attorney, journalist); 1979–92 (Tous's death); this union produced two adopted children: Thais (born 1979) and José Zeus (born 1983)
- Antonio Hernández (Cuban videotape operator); 2002–05 (divorced)

In 2000, Montiel published her autobiography Memories: To Live Is a Pleasure, written by playwright Pedro Víllora, an instant best seller with ten editions to date. A sequel Sara and Sex followed in 2003. In these books, she revealed other relationships in her past, including one-night stands with writer Ernest Hemingway as well as actor James Dean. She also claimed a long-term affair in the 1940s with playwright Miguel Mihura and mentioned that scientist Severo Ochoa, a Nobel Prize winner, was the true love of her life.

In her later years, she became an iconic figure to the gay community, and noted "Cuando voy a actuar a alguna ciudad de EE UU allí están todos los gays de la ciudad" (Whenever I perform in any city in the US, all the gays from that city show up). Montiel died in 2013 at her home in Madrid at the age of eighty-five from congestive heart failure, and was buried in the San Justo Cemetery in Madrid.

== Filmography ==
| Year | Title | Role | Country | Notes |
|---|---|---|---|---|
| 1943 | Te Quiero Para Mí | Ana María | Spain | Credited as "María Alejandra" |
| 1944 | Empezó en Boda | | Spain | |
| 1945 | Bambú | Yoyita, hija del gobernador | Spain | |
| 1945 | Se le Fue el Novio | | Spain | |
| 1945 | El Misterioso Viajero del Clipper | Cristina Gutiérrez | Spain | |
| 1946 | Por el Gran Premio | | Spain | |
| 1946 | Mariona Rebull | Lula | Spain | |
| 1947 | Don Quixote | Antonia | Spain | Released in the U.S. in 1949 |
| 1947 | Alhucemas | María Luisa Pereira | Spain | |
| 1948 | Confidences | Elena | Spain | |
| 1948 | Madness for Love | Aldara | Spain | Released in the U.S. in 1949 as The Mad Queen |
| 1948 | La Mies es Mucha | Guyerati | Spain | |
| 1949 | Troubled Lives | | Spain | |
| 1950 | Pequeñeces... | Monique | Spain | |
| 1951 | Women's Prison | Dora | Mexico | |
| 1951 | Red Fury | María Stevens | Mexico / United States | Stronghold is its English version with Veronica Lake in Montiel's part |
| 1951 | Captain Poison | Angustias | Spain | |
| 1952 | Necesito Dinero | María Teresa | Mexico | |
| 1952 | Here Comes Martin Corona | Rosario | Mexico | |
| 1952 | El Enamorado / Vuelve Martín Corona | Rosario | Mexico | |
| 1953 | She, Lucifer and I | Isabel | Mexico | |
| 1953 | That Man from Tangier | Aixa | Spain / United States | |
| 1953 | Cinnamon Skin | Marucha | Mexico / Cuba | |
| 1953 | Yo soy gallo dondequiera | Rosalia | Mexico | |
| 1953 | Reportaje | | Mexico | She does not appear in the final cut |
| 1954 | Porque Ya No Me Quieres | Rosaura Moreno / Lilia | Mexico | |
| 1954 | Se solicitan modelos | Rosina | Mexico | |
| 1954 | Vera Cruz | Nina | United States | |
| 1955 | Frente al Pecado de Ayer / Cuando se Quiere de Veras | Lucecita | Mexico / Cuba | |
| 1955 | Yo no Creo en los Hombres | María Caridad Robledo | Mexico / Cuba | |
| 1956 | Serenade | Juana Montes | United States | |
| 1956 | Where the Circle Ends | Isabel | Mexico | Circle of Death in the U.S. |
| 1957 | The Last Torch Song | Maria Luján | Spain | |
| 1957 | Run of the Arrow | Yellow Moccasin | United States | |
| 1958 | The Violet Seller | Soledad Moreno | Spain | |
| 1959 | A Girl Against Napoleon | Carmen | Spain | The Devil Made a Woman in the U.S. and U.K. |
| 1960 | My Last Tango | Marta Andreu | Spain | |
| 1961 | Pecado de amor | Magda Beltrán / Sor Belén | Spain | |
| 1962 | The Lovely Lola | Lola | Spain | |
| 1962 | Queen of The Chantecler | La Bella Charito | Spain | |
| 1963 | Casablanca, Nest of Spies | Teresa Vilar | Spain | |
| 1965 | Samba | Belén / Laura Monteiro | Spain / Brazil | |
| 1965 | La dama de Beirut | Isabel Llanos | Spain | |
| 1966 | The Lost Woman | Sara Fernán | Spain | |
| 1967 | Tuset Street | Violeta Riscal | Spain | |
| 1969 | Esa Mujer | Soledad Romero Fuentes | Spain | |
| 1971 | La casa de los Martínez | Herself | Spain | |
| 1971 | Variety | Ana Marqués | Spain | |
| 1974 | Cinco Almohadas para una Noche | Rosa López / Ana | Spain | |
| 1996 | Asaltar los Cielos | Herself | Spain | Documental |
| 2002 | Sara Una Estrella | Herself | Spain | Documental |
| 2002 | Machin, Toda Una Vida | Herself | Spain | Documental |
| 2011 | Abrázame | Sara Montiel | Spain | Final film role |

== Discography ==
- Sara Montiel en Mexico
- Canciones de la Película "El Último Cuple" - Spain: Columbia. UK: London 5409
- La Violetera - Spain: Hispavox. US: Columbia - EX 5056
- Baile con Sara Montiel
- Carmen la de Ronda - Spain: Hispavox. US: Columbia EX 5020
- Besos de Fuego
- Mi Último Tango - Spain: Hispavox. US: Columbia EX 5048
- El Tango
- Pecado de Amor - Spain: Hispavox. US: Columbia EX 5092
- La Bella Lola
- Noches De Casablanca
- Samba
- La Dama de Beirut
- Canta Sarita Montiel
- Esa Mujer
- Sara
- Varietés
- Sara... Hoy
- Saritisima
- Anoche con Sara
- Purisimo Sara
- Sara De Cine
- Sara A Flor de Piel
- Amados Mios
- Todas Las Noches A Las Once
- Sara Montiel La Diva
- Sara Montiel La Leyenda
- Besame - Spain: Hispavox. US: Columbia EX 5077 (1962)
- Songs From The Film Besame - Spain: Hispavox. US: Columbia EX 5135

== Awards ==
| Year | Award | Category | Work | Result | Ref |
|---|---|---|---|---|---|
| 1957 | Circle of Cinematographic Writers Awards | Best Main Actress | The Last Torch Song | Won | |
| 1958 | Circle of Cinematographic Writers Awards | Best Main Actress | The Violet Seller | Won | |
| 1959 | National Syndicate of Spectacle Awards | Best Actress | The Violet Seller | Won | |
| 1999 | Circle of Cinematographic Writers Awards | Tribute Award | - | Won | |

== Honours ==
- 1997 - Gold Medal of the Academy of Cinematographic Arts and Sciences of Spain.
- 2001 - Rita Moreno HOLA Award for Excellence.
- 2008 - Gold Medal of Merit in Labour (Kingdom of Spain, 5 December 2008).
- 2012 - "Reina de la Belleza Honorífica".

== Legacy ==
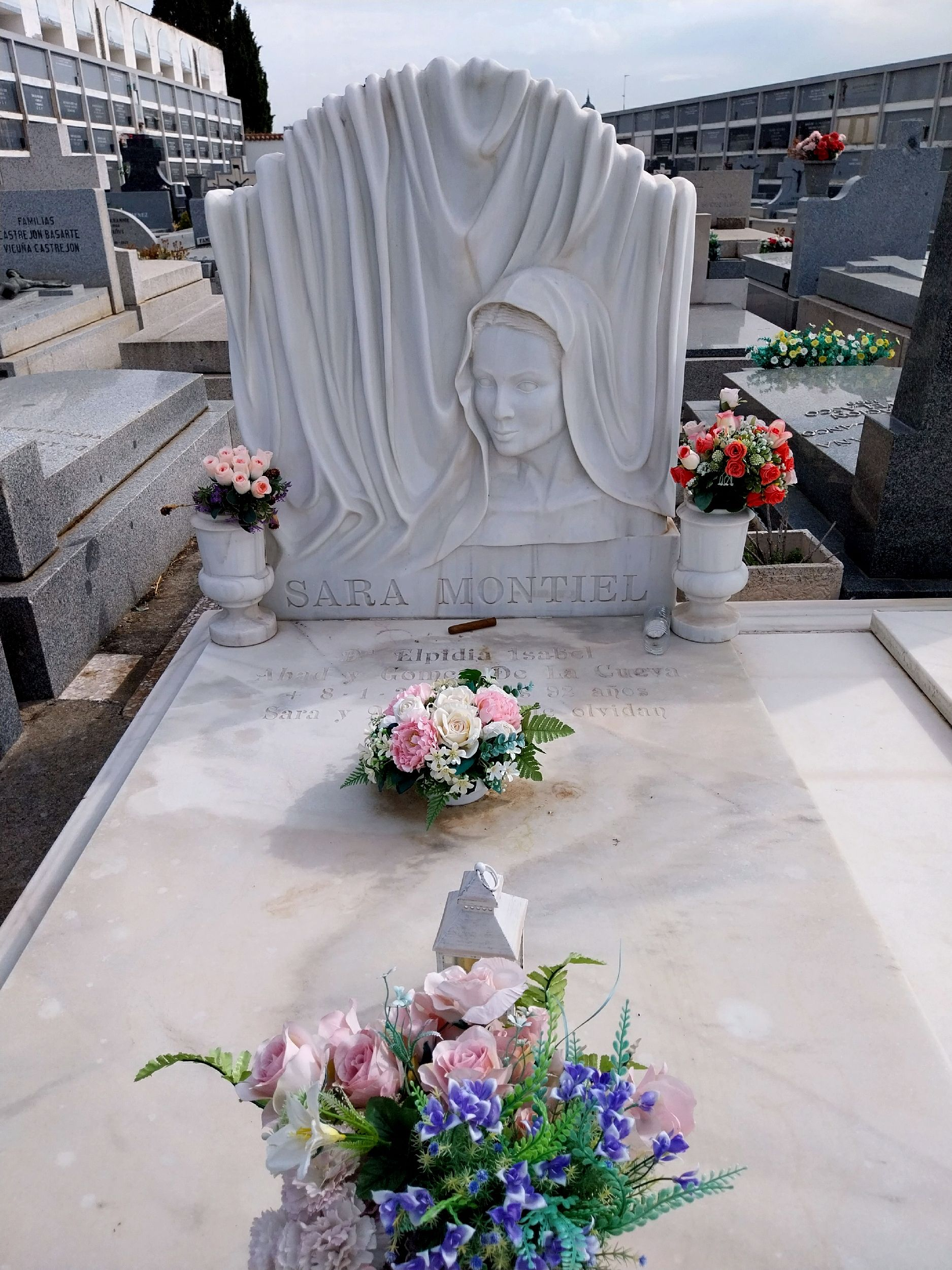
Montiel's grave at San Justo Cemetery in Madrid.

=== Museum ===
The Sara Montiel Museum, opened in 1991, is a museum in Campo de Criptana dedicated to her. It is housed in a sixteenth century windmill and displays photographs, wardrobe and personal belongings of the actress as well as posters of her films. In May 2021 it reopened after undergoing a restoration and modernization.

=== In popular culture ===
Correos, the Spanish postal service, issued in 2014 a sheet of stamps in tribute to three recently deceased famous Spanish cinema artists: Sara Montiel, Alfredo Landa and Manolo Escobar. The stamp that pays tribute to Montiel depicts her in a scene from The Violet Seller.

She was portrayed in the Pedro Almodóvar film Bad Education (2004) by a male actor in drag (Gael García Bernal) as the cross-dressing character Zahara, and a film clip from one of her movies was used, as well.

== Notes ==
a. In Spain, ten million pesetas (€60,101) in 1957, adjusted for inflation using the consumer price index, in 2022 would be approximately €3 million, while its purchasing power would be €10–16 million.
b. The exchange rate in June 1957 was of forty-two pesetas to the United States dollar.
