= Blueprint for a Massacre =

1967 film by Roberto Bianchi Montero

- Directed by: Roberto Bianchi Montero
- Written by: Jesús María de Arozamena; Roberto Bianchi Montero
- Starring: Germán Cobos; María Mahor
- Cinematography: Giuseppe La Torre
- Music by: Piero Umiliani
- Release date: 1967

Blueprint for a Massacre (Italian: Tecnica per un massacro, Spanish: Técnica para un sabotaje or Agente Z 55: Secreto atómico), also known as Agent Z-55: Atomic Secret, is a 1967 Italian-Spanish Eurospy film co-written and directed by Roberto Bianchi Montero and starring Germán Cobos.

== Plot ==
A series of incidents involving aircraft belonging to NATO nations indicates a systematic sabotage.

== Cast ==
- Germán Cobos as Danny O'Connor / Agent Z-55
- María Mahor as Aya
- Franco Ressel
- Gabriella Andreini
- Maria Pia Conte
- Remo De Angelis
- Irving B. Mayer
- Carlo Gervasi
- Sal Borgese
- Pietro Ceccarelli

== Production ==
The film was shot back to back with Desperate Mission, of which it is the sequel. During the shooting, Nick Nostro replaced Montero for two weeks.
