= Ana María Noé =

Spanish actress

- Born: 1914; Palma de Mallorca, Spain
- Died: 9 July 1970 (aged 55–56); Madrid, Spain
- Occupation: Actress

Ana María Noé (1914 – 9 July 1970) was a Spanish actress.

== Biography ==
Ana María Noé began her artistic career in Barcelona and began to gain prominence after the Spanish Civil War. By 1940 she had her own company with which she performed Lo increíble (1940), El nido ajeno (1941), and Vidas cruzadas (1942), all by Jacinto Benavente and Enric Guitart.

In 1942 she premiered Time and the Conways by J. B. Priestley in Spain, at Teatro María Guerrero, followed by Don Álvaro o la fuerza del sino with Alfonso Muñoz at the Teatro Español, Hay una mujer de diferencia (1944), and Las de Caín (1945). In the early 1950s she joined the company of the Teatro Español, under the direction of José Tamayo, and premiered great literary plays such as Dialogues of the Carmelites by Georges Bernanos (1954), Six Characters in Search of an Author by Pirandello (1955), Proceso de Jesús by Diego Fabbri (1956), The Crucible by Arthur Miller (1956), The Diary of Anne Frank (1957), Requiem for a Nun by William Faulkner (1957), Don Juan Tenorio by José Zorrilla (1958), and Un soñador para un pueblo by Antonio Buero Vallejo (1958). In the early 1960s she left the Teatro Español, but maintained her theatrical activity with hits such as Long Day's Journey into Night by Eugene O'Neill (1960), La dama del alba by Alejandro Casona (1962), and La pechuga de la sardina by Lauro Olmo (1964).

She debuted in the cinema and acted in 20 films, some of them Spaghetti Westerns in the 1960s. In that decade she also had a prominent presence on television, with appearances on shows such as Novela and Estudio 1.

== Filmography ==
Year	Title	Role	Notes
1942	Se ha perdido un cadáver		
1961	Los cuervos	Berta	
1961	Pecado de amor	Bella	
1962	Kill and Be Killed	Doña Ana	
1962	Mentirosa		
1962	Los culpables	Dueña de la tienda de telas	
1962	Girl from La Mancha	Mujer enferma	
1963	La becerrada	Madre Superiora	
1963	Vida de familia	Aurelia	
1964	El espontáneo	La Madre	
1965	Jandro	Regina	
1965	El mundo sigue	Lina	
1965	The Great Leaders	Mother of Samson	
1965	El castigador	Señora Eugenia	
1966	Seven Guns for the MacGregors	Mamie MacGregor	
1966	La dama del alba	Sirvienta	
1967	Fury of Johnny Kid	Mother Monter	
1967	Up the MacGregors!	Mamie Mac Gregor	
1967	O.K. Connery	Lotte Krayendorf	
1967	Al ponerse el sol	Carmen Lara	
1967	La mujer de otro		
1969	Sabata	Sharky's Mother	Uncredited
1969	Los escondites		
1970	Matalo!	Constance Benson	
1971	El diablo Cojuelo	Celestina	
