= Germán Cobos =

Spanish actor

German Cobos
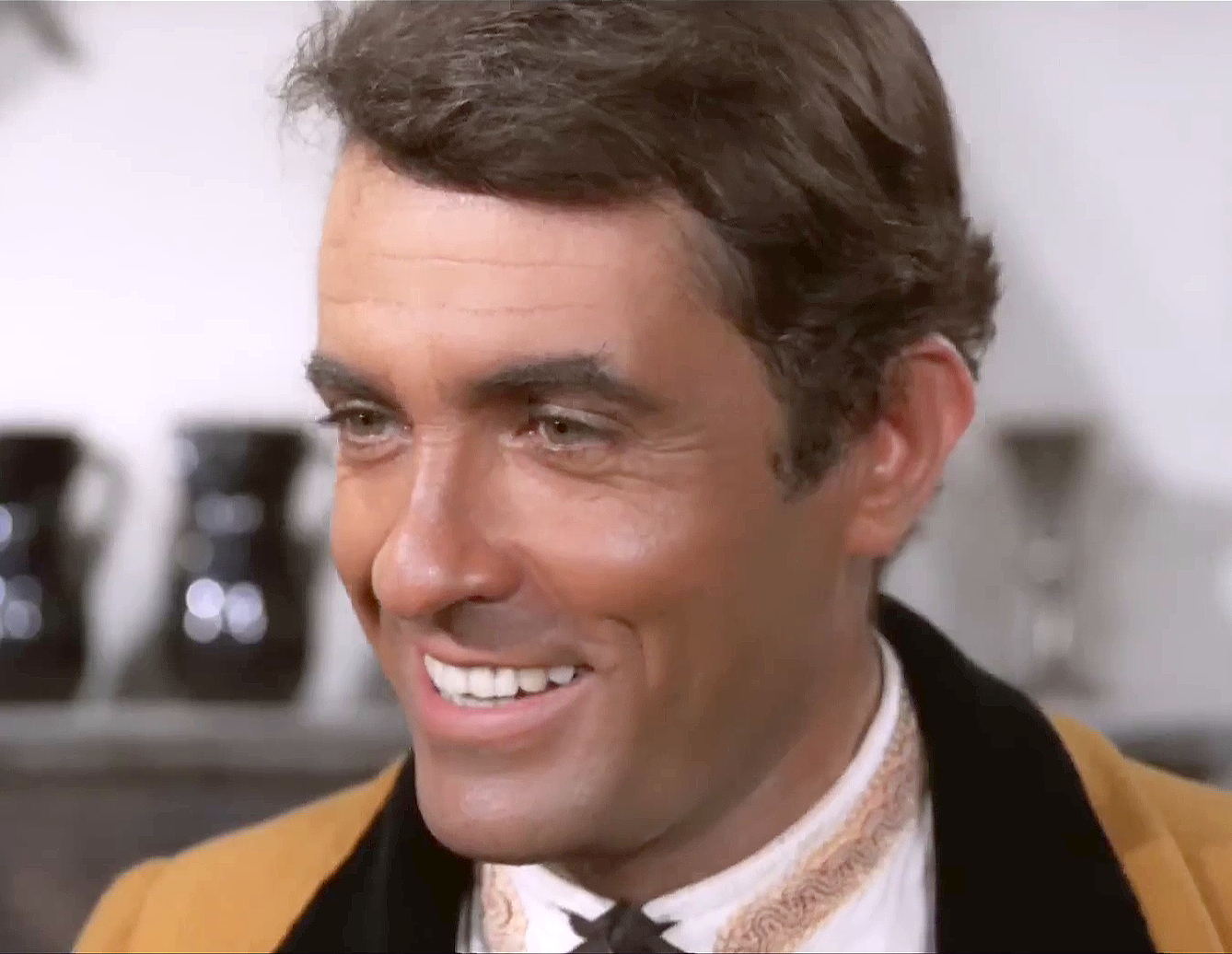
- Born: Germán Sánchez Hernández Cobos; July 7, 1927; Sevilla, Spain
- Died: January 12, 2015 (aged 87); Almunécar, Spain
- Occupations: Film and television actor
- Spouse: Visitación Peralta

Germán Sánchez Hernández-Cobos (7 July 1927 – 12 January 2015) was a prolific Spanish actor in a variety of European films. He was married to Visitación Peralta.

== Biography ==
He was born on 7 July 1927 in Sevilla. He was known for playing Arturo Torres in Arrayán, by Canal Sur Televisión.

He first appeared at film on La leona de Castilla (1951), directed by Rafael Gil. In 2010 he received the golden medal by the Asociación Española de Historadores del Cine.

He died on 12 January 2015 at the age of 88.

== Selected filmography ==
- The Lioness of Castille (1951)
- Flight 971 (1953) - Primer oficial
- Judas' Kiss (1954) - Andrés (uncredited)
- La patrulla (1954) - Calatayud
- The Other Life of Captain Contreras (1955) - Pedro
- Marta (1955)
- Mañana cuando amanezca (1955)
- La vida es maravillosa (1956) - Eugenio Jalón
- Return to the Truth (1956) - Carlos
- Cuerda de presos (1956) - Silvestre
- Torrepartida (1956) - Manuel
- Le schiave di Cartagine (1956) - Tullius
- Roberto el diablo (1957) - Roberto
- Saranno uomini (1957)
- The Star of Africa (1957)
- Susanna Whipped Cream (1957) - Alberto
- Femmine tre volte (1957) - IMDb Ugo
- The Lady Doctor (1957) - Avv. Otello Bellomo
- El ángel está en la cumbre (1958) - Carlos Valle
- Soledad (1959) - Paco
- A Girl Against Napoleon (1959) - Lucas
- Ama Rosa (1960) - Javier
- One Step Forward (1960) - Rafael Aguirre
- Los abanderados de la Providencia (1960)
- At Five O'Clock in the Afternoon (1960) - José Álvarez
- Taxi for Tobruk (1961) - Jean Ramirez
- El amor empieza en sábado (1961) - Carlos
- Despedida de soltero (1961) - Miguel
- Abuelita Charlestón (1962) - Pierre
- El hombre del expreso de Oriente (1962)
- Héroes de blanco (1962)
- The Lovely Lola (1962) - Federico
- I tromboni di Fra Diavolo (1962) - Il colonnello Chamonis
- The Castilian (1963) - Abderramán
- 40 años de novios (1963) - Valentín Pereira
- The Troublemaker (1963) - Felipe
- Los felices sesenta (1963) - Pablo
- Les Parias de la gloire (1964) - Albertini
- Apache Fury (1964)
- Doomed Fort (1964) - Paul Driscoll
- Destino: Barajas (1965)
- El puente de la ilusión (1965)
- Brilliant Future (1965) - Antonio
- Julieta engaña a Romeo (1965) - Roberto
- Desperate Mission (1965) - Robert Manning / Danny O'Connor / Agent Z-55
- Algunas lecciones de amor (1966) - Presentador / Juan
- El secreto del capitán O'Hara (1966) - Capitán Richard O'Hara
- Blueprint for a Massacre (1967) - Danny O'Connor / Agent Z-55
- Wanted (1967) - Martin Heywood
- Fistful of Diamonds (1967) - Clark
- Camerino Without a Folding Screen (1967)
- El rostro del asesino (1967) - Carlos
- Lola Colt (1967) - Larry Stern / El Diablo
- El halcón de Castilla (1967) - Don Diego de Mendoza
- Sangue chiama sangue (1968) - Padre Louis
- Quinto: non ammazzare (1969) - Sucre
- Matrimonios separados (1969) - Daniel
- ¡¡Se armó el belén!! (1970) - Don José
- Reverend's Colt (1970) - Fred
- Marianela (1972) - D. Carlos
- Sexy Cat (1973) - Mike Cash
- Las alegres vampiras de Vögel (1975) - Carlo
- Cría Cuervos (1976) - Nicolás Garontes
- Las camareras (1976) - Enrique
- Foul Play (1977) - Emigrante
- Hidden Pleasures (1977) - Ignacio
- Solos en la madrugada (1978) - Ramón Vidal
- Demasiado para Gálvez (1981) - El editor
- Law of Desire (1987) - El Cura
- The Rogues (1987) - Impresario teatrale
- Tu novia está loca (1988) - Padre de Amaia
- El aire de un crimen (1988) - Amaro
- Contra el viento (1990) - Antonio
- Ispanskaya aktrisa dlya russkogo ministra (1990) - Producer
- Bazar Viena (1990)
- La taberna fantástica (1991)
- La viuda del capitán Estrada (1991) - Mondéjar
- El día que nací yo (1991) - Rafael
- Un paraguas para tres (1992) - Padre de Daniel
- Tres palabras (1993) - Gordillo
- Boca a boca (1995) - Padre de Luci
- Mirada líquida (1996) - Padre de Antonio
- Esposados (1996, Short) - Sr. Guerrero
- Beyond the Garden (1996) - Alvaro Larra
- Arrayán (2001, TV Series) - D. Arturo Torres
- Pas si grave (2003) - Gabo
- C'est la vie, camarade! (2005, TV Movie) - Delgado
