= The Lost Woman =

1966 film

- Directed by: Tulio Demicheli
- Written by: Jesús María de Arozamena; Tulio Demicheli; Manuel Pombo Angulo
- Produced by: Cesáreo González
- Starring: Sara Montiel; Giancarlo Del Duca; Massimo Serato
- Cinematography: Christian Matras
- Edited by: José Luis Matesanz
- Music by: Gregorio García Segura
- Production companies: Cesáreo González Producciones Cinematográficas; Filmes Cinematografica; Terra Films
- Distributed by: Suevia Films
- Release date: 21 October 1966
- Running time: 105 minutes
- Countries: France; Italy; Spain
- Language: Spanish

The Lost Woman (Spanish: La mujer perdida) is a 1966 drama film directed by Tulio Demicheli and starring Sara Montiel, Giancarlo Del Duca and Massimo Serato. It was a co-production between France, Italy and Spain. The film's sets were designed by the art director Enrique Alarcón.

== Plot ==
Sara Fernán escapes from the poor fishing village of her childhood and finds work in a flamenco tavern, a tablao. One day Rafael, a politician with connections, hears her and is so impressed with her performance that he decides to help her advance her musical career. He takes her to Madrid, pays for her singing lessons, and shows her how to dress with taste. In the capital, lifted by his support, she triumphs as a singer. To avoid complicating Rafael's political career, she embarks on a grand tour of Europe.

== Cast ==
- Sara Montiel as Sara Fernán
- Giancarlo Del Duca as Miguel Fabri
- Massimo Serato as D. Rafael Valcálcer
- Carmen Bernardos as Ani
- Christiane Minazzoli as Elena, marquesa de Silva
- Antonio Ferrandis as Falcón
- Michel Lemoine as Julio
- José María Seoane
- María Fernanda Ladrón de Guevara
- María Isbert as China Pérez
- Luis Induni
- Rafael Bardem
- Carlota Bilbao
- Xan das Bolas
- Miguel del Castillo
- José Orjas as Diputado #2
- José María Caffarel as Diputado #1
- Sara Guasch
- Alfonso del Real as Borracho
- Manuel Soriano
- Emilio S. Espinosa
- Juan Cazalilla
- Inma de Santis as Niña

== Bibliography ==
- John King & Nissa Torrents. The Garden of Forking Paths: Argentine Cinema. British Film Institute, 1988.
