= A Girl Against Napoleon =

A Girl Against Napoleon; The Devil Made a Woman
- Spanish: Carmen, la de Ronda
- Directed by: Tulio Demicheli
- Screenplay by: Antonio Mas Guindal; Tulio Demicheli; Jesús María de Arozamena
- Story by: Alfonso Sastre
- Based on: Carmen by Prosper Mérimée
- Produced by: Benito Perojo
- Starring: Sara Montiel; Jorge Mistral; Maurice Ronet
- Cinematography: Antonio L. Ballesteros
- Edited by: Antonio Ramírez de Loaysa
- Music by: Gregorio García Segura
- Color process: Eastmancolor
- Production company: Producciones Benito Perojo
- Distributed by: Suevia Films
- Release date: 21 September 1959
- Running time: 106 minutes
- Country: Spain
- Language: Spanish

A Girl Against Napoleon or The Devil Made a Woman, also known under its Spanish title Carmen, la de Ronda, is a 1959 Spanish historical adventure film directed by Tulio Demicheli and starring Sara Montiel, Jorge Mistral and Maurice Ronet. It is loosely based on the story of Prosper Mérimée's Carmen, with the setting changed to the Peninsular War era. Carmen is involved with the guerrillas fighting against the French occupation.

The film's sets were designed by the art director Enrique Alarcón and built at CEA Studios in Madrid.

== Plot ==
The year is 1808. A year passed since the beginning of the Peninsular War and singer Carmen is in love with two men at the same time. The men are: a guerrilla named Antonio and the French sergeant José, who, during the war, end up on the opposite sides and therefore are sworn enemies to each other.

== Cast ==
- Sara Montiel as Carmen
- Jorge Mistral as Antonio
- Maurice Ronet as José
- Germán Cobos as Lucas
- José Marco Davó as Alcalde
- Félix Fernández as El Dancairo
- María de los Ángeles Hortelano as Micaela
- Santiago Rivero as Andrés
- Alfonso Rojas
- Agustín González as Guerrillero
- Antonio Delgado
- Pilar Gómez Ferrer
- Manuel Guitián as Pregonero
- Teresa Gisbert
- Joaquín Bergía
- Víctor Bayo
- Ricardo Tundidor
- Antonio Cintado as Oficial francés
- Amedeo Nazzari as Coronel
- Ventura Oller
