= Samba (1965 film) =

1965 film directed by Rafael Gil

- Directed by: Rafael Gil
- Written by: Jesús María de Arozamena; Rafael Gil; José López Rubio
- Produced by: Marciano de la Fuente; Cesáreo González; Vicente Ramirez
- Starring: Sara Montiel; Marc Michel; Fosco Giachetti
- Cinematography: Christian Matras; Gábor Pogány
- Edited by: Antonio Ramírez de Loaysa
- Music by: Gregorio García Segura
- Production companies: Condor Filmes; Suevia Films
- Distributed by: Suevia Films
- Release date: 28 January 1965
- Running time: 106 minutes
- Countries: Brazil; Spain
- Language: Spanish

Samba is a 1965 Brazilian-Spanish musical film directed by Rafael Gil and starring Sara Montiel, Marc Michel and Fosco Giachetti.

The film's sets were designed by the art directors Enrique Alarcón and Pierino Massenzi.

== Cast ==
- Sara Montiel as Belén / Laura Monteiro
- Marc Michel as Paulo
- Fosco Giachetti as João Fernandes de Oliveira
- Carlos Alberto as Assis
- José Prada as Oliveira's lawyer
- Zeni Pereira as Trinidad
- Eliezer Gomes as Negro gangster
- Antonio Pitanga as Paulo's friend
- Álvaro Aguiar as White gangster
- José Policena
- Antonia Marzullo as Belén's grandmother
- Grande Otelo as Freitas
- Arlindo Rodrigues as himself / Salgueiro art director
- Leila Adiles
- Ernesto Alves
- Nestor de Montemar
- Moacyr Deriquém as Copacabana seducer
- Wilson Grey as man in samba school committee
- Milton Luiz
- Ciro Monteiro as President of Salgueiro Samba School
- Maria Regina
- Leonardo Villar

== Bibliography ==
- Aurora G. Morcillo. The Seduction of Modern Spain: The Female Body and the Francoist Body Politic. Bucknell University Press, 2010.
