= Roberto Bianchi Montero =

Italian actor, director, and screenwriter (1907–1986)

- Born: 7 December 1907; Rome, Italy
- Died: 7 December 1986 (aged 79); Valmontone, Italy
- Occupations: Screenwriter, film director, actor

Roberto Bianchi Montero (7 December 1907 – 7 December 1986) was an Italian actor, director and screenwriter.

== Life and career ==
Born in Rome, Bianchi Montero started acting as a teenager on stage and he was a member of an amateur theater group with whom he performed in several festivals. In 1930 he entered the stage company of Ettore Petrolini, and in 1934 he founded his own company. In 1936 he got his first film role, and in the late 1930s he also was assistant director for a number of films.

After the Second World War, Bianchi Montero directed numerous genre films, usually low-budget productions, in which he often also collaborated to the screenplays. He particularly specialized in melodramas, Spaghetti Westerns and Commedia sexy all'italiana films. He was the father of the director Mario Bianchi.

== Selected filmography ==
- Battles in the Shadow (1938)
- Then We'll Get a Divorce (1940)
- The Secret of Villa Paradiso (1940)
- After Casanova's Fashion (1942)
- Faddija – La legge della vendetta (1949)
- The Cliff of Sin (1950)
- A Mother Returns (1952)
- The Island Monster (1954)
- Goodbye Naples (1955)
- La sceriffa (1959)
- La Pica sul Pacifico (1959)
- Between Shanghai and St. Pauli (1962)
- Tharus Son of Attila (1962)
- Mondo Balordo (1964) documentary, released in U.S. 1966
- Oklahoma John (1965)
- Desperate Mission (1965)
- The Last Tomahawk (1965)
- Seven Pistols for a Gringo (1966)
- Blueprint for a Massacre (1967)
- The Battle of the Damned (Italian: Quella dannata pattuglia) (1969)
- 36 Hours to Hell (1969)
- The Magnificent Robin Hood (Italian: Il magnifico Robin Hood) (1970)
- The Rangers (Italian: Rangers attacco ora X) (1970)
- Eye of the Spider (1971)
- So Sweet, So Dead (1972)
- La cameriera (1974)
- The Secret Nights of Lucrezia Borgia (1982)
