= Lola (1961 film) =

1961 film by Jacques Demy

- Theatrical release poster
- Directed by: Jacques Demy
- Written by: Jacques Demy
- Produced by: Carlo Ponti; Georges de Beauregard
- Starring: Anouk Aimée; Marc Michel; Alan Scott; Jacques Harden; Margo Lion
- Cinematography: Raoul Coutard
- Edited by: Anne-Marie Cotret; Monique Teisseire
- Music by: Michel Legrand
- Production company: Rome-Paris Films
- Distributed by: Unidex (France); Euro International Films (Italy)
- Release dates: 3 March 1961 (France); 18 March 1961 (Italy)
- Running time: 90 minutes
- Countries: France; Italy
- Languages: French; English
- Budget: ≈ $70,000 (US)

Lola is a 1961 romantic drama film written and directed by Jacques Demy (in his feature directorial debut) as a tribute to director Max Ophüls, described by Demy as a "musical without music". Anouk Aimée stars in the titular role. The film was restored and re-released by Demy's widow, French filmmaker Agnès Varda.

The names of the film and title character were inspired by Josef von Sternberg's 1930 film The Blue Angel, in which Marlene Dietrich played a burlesque performer named Lola Lola.

== Plot ==
In the French port city of Nantes, Roland Cassard is a young man drifting aimlessly through life and unable to hold a job for long. In a bookstore, Roland, a literature enthusiast, meets Madame Desnoyers and her 13-year-old daughter Cécile. Overhearing that Madame Desnoyers is looking for a dictionary for her daughter, who is learning English, Roland offers to give them his dictionary and remarks that Cécile reminds him of a childhood friend also named Cécile. Widowed since World War II, Madame Desnoyers is charmed by Roland.

In the Passage Pommeraye, Roland runs into his childhood friend Cécile for the first time since the war, and she is happy to see him. Under the stage name Lola, Cécile performs as a dancer at L'Eldorado, a cabaret frequented by visiting sailors. She is having an affair with Frankie, an American sailor who is soon to return to his homeland. According to Lola, Frankie reminds her of her first love, Michel, who left her seven years earlier to go abroad after getting her pregnant. She now raises their young son Yvon alone. Roland frequents the same café by the port as Michel's mother, Jeanne, who has not heard from her son since he left.

Struggling to find work, Roland accepts a shady job from the local hairdresser, which consists of smuggling a suitcase to Johannesburg. He later visits Cécile to give her the dictionary. Cécile meets Frankie in a newsstand and soon becomes smitten with him. Lola goes on a date with Roland and tells him about Michel, saying she is hopeful that he will return. The next day, Roland sees Lola with Frankie and later confesses his love for her, but she does not reciprocate and claims she is leaving for the United States with Frankie. Disappointed, Roland calls Lola a "whore" and leaves.

Before leaving for Cherbourg, Frankie goes to a funfair with Cécile. Shortly after learning that the hairdresser has been arrested for diamond smuggling, Roland runs into Lola in the Passage Pommeraye. Roland apologizes to Lola for his behavior the previous day, while she confesses that Frankie meant nothing to her, and that she is actually leaving for a two-month gig in Marseilles. After Roland and Lola part as friends, Madame Desnoyers tells him that Cécile has run away to Cherbourg to live with her uncle, a hairdresser, unaware that he is her biological father.

With nothing holding him back anymore, Roland decides to leave Nantes. Michel unexpectedly returns to town, much to the amazement of his mother Jeanne, and proclaims he is now rich. Shortly after Michel leaves to meet Lola, Roland arrives at the café and is informed by Jeanne of Michel's return. As Lola bids goodbye to her fellow dancers at L'Eldorado, Michel shows up, and she rushes into his arms. Michel reveals that he has been in Nantes for three days, working up the courage to see Lola. As Lola and Yvon ride off in Michel's car, she sees Roland heading in the opposite direction with a suitcase. Michel asks Lola if something is wrong, to which she responds, "Nothing".

== Cast ==
- Anouk Aimée as Lola
- Marc Michel as Roland Cassard
- Jacques Harden as Michel
- Alan Scott as Frankie
- Elina Labourdette as Madame Desnoyers
- Margo Lion as Jeanne
- Annie Dupéroux as Cécile Desnoyers
- Corinne Marchand as Daisy

== Production ==
Filming took place from 7 June to 17 July 1960 in Nantes and La Baule-Escoublac.

== Critical reception ==
Lola received moderate reviews from critics. Chicago Reader's Jonathan Rosenbaum wrote it was "among the most neglected major works of the French New Wave" and "in some ways [Demy's] best feature."

Variety noted that "the mixture of melodrama, satire and poetics does not entirely jell. It is offbeat, with shafts of tender feeling and truth. But trying to touch on too many subjects makes the film uneven. Anouk Aimee has a pathetic quality as the mythomaniacal dancer who finally finds happiness, while Marc Michel is properly aimless as the boy. Lensing has the proper gray quality for this pleasant, unusual pic."

Travis Hooper of Film Freak Central gave it three-and-a-half out of four stars, stating that he believed that it "doesn't have the intellectual rigour of those other films". He went on to write that it "is stronger for feeling, showing that we need more than the confirmation of the worst if we intend to make it through our lives intact."

Not Just Movies gave Lola an A rating, mostly for Demy's "New Wave-cum-classical style", which "creates a self-contained world that gives a softly lit haze to reality as characters constantly aim for each other and miss, sometimes passing within mere inches of each other before carrying on or being redirected."

Wong Kar-Wai cited Lola as a primary influence on his film Chungking Express (1994), in inspiring that film's second half.

On review aggregator website Rotten Tomatoes, the film holds an approval rating of 95% based on 20 reviews, with an average rating of 8.1/10.

== Awards and nominations ==
- 1963 BAFTA – Nominated for Best Film from Any Source and Best Foreign Actress for Anouk Aimée
- 2001 New York Film Critics Circle Awards – Won the Special Award (also for the re-release of Demy's second film Bay of Angels)

== See also ==
- Model Shop
- The Umbrellas of Cherbourg
