= Pecado de amor (film) =

- Directed by: Luis César Amadori
- Written by: Jesús María de Arozamena; Luis César Amadori
- Screenplay by: Jesús María de Arozamena; Luis César Amadori
- Produced by: Cesáreo González; Benito Perojo
- Starring: Sara Montiel; Reginald Kernan; Rafael Alonso; Mario Girotti
- Cinematography: Antonio L. Ballesteros
- Edited by: Antonio Ramírez de Loaysa
- Music by: Gregorio García Segura
- Production companies: Cesáreo González Producciones Cinematográficas; Producciones Benito Perojo; Transmonde Film
- Distributed by: Cesáreo González Producciones Cinematográficas; Divisa Home Video; Excisa S.A.; Suevia Films
- Release date: 14 December 1961 (Madrid)
- Running time: 116 min
- Country: Argentina
- Language: Spanish

Pecado de amor is a 1961 Argentine musical drama film directed by Luis César Amadori and starred by Sara Montiel, Rafael Alonso and Reginald Kernan. It was produced by Cesáreo González and Benito Perojo, written by Gabriel Peña, Jesús María de Arozamena and Luis César Amadori and composed by Gregorio García Segura.

== Cast ==
- Sara Montiel as Magda Beltrán / Sor Belén
- Reginald Kernan as Adolfo Vega Linares
- Rafael Alonso as Maestro Miranda
- Gérard Tichy as Gerardo Esquivel
- Mario Girotti as Ángel Vega
- Alessandra Panaro as Esperanza
- Ana María Custodio as Sra. Vega
- Ana María Noé as Bella
- Clelia Mattania as Sirvienta de Magda
- Xan das Bolas as Sereno
- Jorge Llopis
- María Silva as Novia y esposa de Ángel Vega
- Isabel Pallarés as Sor María
- Eleonora Bianchi as Aurora
- Diego Hurtado as Secretario de Adolfo Vega
- Pilar Gómez Ferrer as Rosalía
- Ángel Menéndez
- Mario Morales as Abogado defensor
- José María Labernié
- Francisco Bernal as waiter
