= Scent of a Crime =

- Theatrical release poster
- Spanish: El aire de un crimen
- Directed by: Antonio Isasi-Isasmendi
- Screenplay by: Gabriel Castro; Antonio Isasi Isasmendi; Jorge R. Álamo
- Based on: El aire de un crimen by Juan Benet
- Starring: Paco Rabal; Maribel Verdú; Germán Cobos; Chema Mazo; M.ª José Moreno; Miguel Rellán; Rafaela Aparicio; Agustín González; Ovidi Montllor; Terele Pávez; Alfred Lucchetti; Ramoncín; Fernando Rey
- Cinematography: Juan Gelpí
- Edited by: Amat Carreras
- Music by: Francisco Aguarod; Luis Fatás
- Production company: Isasi PC
- Distributed by: Tripictures
- Release dates: September 1988 (SSIFF); 28 October 1988 (Spain)
- Language: Spanish

Scent of a Crime (Spanish: El aire de un crimen) is a 1988 Spanish rural crime drama film directed by Antonio Isasi-Isasmendi consisting of an adaptation of the novel El aire de un crimen by Juan Benet. The cast features Paco Rabal, Maribel Verdú, Chema Mazo, Fernando Rey and Germán Cobos, among others.

== Plot ==
Set in 1950s Spain, the plot tracks the developments after a corpse belonging to a stranger is found in the village of Bocentellas, located in the territory of 'Región'. Upon the arrival of the magistrate, the corpse has been replaced by a different one.

== Cast ==
- Paco Rabal as El coronel
- Fernando Rey as Fayón
- Maribel Verdú as La Chiqui
- Germán Cobos as Amaro
- Chema Mazo as Capitán Medina
- Miguel Rellán as Doctor Sebastián
- Rafaela Aparicio
- Agustín González
- Ovidi Montllor
- Terele Pávez
- Alfred Lucchetti
- Ramoncín
- María José Moreno as La Tacón
- Pep Castells
- Pedro Beltrán
- Luis Ciges

== Production ==
The film is an Isasi PC production. Shooting locations included Calatayud (province of Zaragoza) and the neighbouring La Tranquera reservoir.

== Release ==
The film was presented at the 36th San Sebastián International Film Festival's official selection in September 1988. Distributed by Tripictures, the film was theatrically released in Spain on 28 October 1988.

== Reception ==
Octavi Martí of El País considered that the overly "flat" cinematography "does not always do justice to the locations and characters", adding up to other flaws that underpin a somewhat "dusty scent" relatable not just to a film set in the 1950s, but to a film shot then too.

== Accolades ==
Year	Award	Category	Nominee(s)	Result	Ref.
1988	36th San Sebastián International Film Festival	Silver Shell for Best Actor	Fernando Rey	Won	
1989	3rd Goya Awards	Best Adapted Screenplay	Gabriel Castro, Antonio Isasi Isasmendi, Jorge R. Álamo	Nominated	

== See also ==
- List of Spanish films of 1988
