= Tuset Street =

- Directed by: Luis Marquina
- Written by: Rafael Azcona; Jorge Grau; Enrique Josa
- Produced by: Sara Montiel
- Starring: Sara Montiel; Patrick Bauchau; Teresa Gimpera
- Cinematography: Alejandro Ulloa
- Edited by: José Luis Matesanz
- Music by: Augusto Algueró
- Color process: Eastmancolor
- Production company: Proesa for Cesáreo González S.A. P.C.
- Distributed by: Suevia Films
- Release date: 16 September 1968
- Running time: 92 minutes
- Country: Spain
- Language: Spanish

Tuset Street is a 1968 Spanish musical film directed by Jorge Grau and Luis Marquina and starring Sara Montiel, Patrick Bauchau and Teresa Gimpera.

== Cast ==
- Sara Montiel as Violeta Riscal
- Patrick Bauchau as Jorge Artigas
- Teresa Gimpera as Teresa
- Jacinto Esteva as Mik
- Emma Cohen as Mariona
- Luis García Berlanga as Aparicio
- Jaume Picas as Llongueras
- Tomás Torres as Oriel
- Adrià Gual
- Óscar Pellicer as Pesa
- Francisco Barnaba
- Milagros Guijarro
- Alfredo Landa as Cheering Man in Audience

== Bibliography ==
- Bentley, Bernard. A Companion to Spanish Cinema. Boydell & Brewer 2008.
