= The Umbrellas of Cherbourg =

1964 film by Jacques Demy

- French theatrical release poster
- French: Les Parapluies de Cherbourg
- Directed by: Jacques Demy
- Written by: Jacques Demy
- Produced by: Mag Bodard
- Starring: Catherine Deneuve; Anne Vernon; Nino Castelnuovo; Marc Michel
- Cinematography: Jean Rabier
- Edited by: Anne-Marie Cotret; Monique Teisseire
- Music by: Michel Legrand
- Production companies: Parc Film; Madeleine Films; Beta Film GmbH
- Distributed by: American International Pictures (U.S.); 20th Century Fox (France)
- Release dates: 19 February 1964 (France); 12 November 1965 (West Germany)
- Running time: 91 minutes
- Countries: France; West Germany
- Language: French
- Budget: $0.2 million
- Box office: $7.6 million

The Umbrellas of Cherbourg (French: Les Parapluies de Cherbourg) is a 1964 musical romantic drama film written and directed by Jacques Demy, with music by Michel Legrand. Catherine Deneuve and Nino Castelnuovo star as two young lovers in the French city of Cherbourg, separated by circumstance. The film's dialogue is entirely sung as recitative, including casual conversation, and is sung-through like some operas and stage musicals. It has been seen as the second of an informal tetralogy of Demy films that share some of the same actors, characters, and overall atmosphere of romantic melancholy, coming after Lola (1961) and before The Young Girls of Rochefort (1967) and Model Shop (1969). The French-language film was a co-production between France and West Germany.

The Umbrellas of Cherbourg won the Palme d'Or at the 1964 Cannes Film Festival, making it the only film of the French New Wave to do so. In the United States, it was nominated for Best Foreign Language Film at the 37th Academy Awards and four more at the 38th ceremony including Best Original Screenplay (Demy), Best Original Score (Demy and Legrand), and Best Original Song for the film's main theme, "I Will Wait for You". It was later adapted into an English-language stage musical.

In 2018, a BBC Culture critics' poll ranked the film at number 51 in the Top 100 Greatest Non-English Films of All Time.

== Plot ==
=== Part One: The Departure (November 1957) ===
Madame Émery and her 17-year-old daughter Geneviève run a tiny, struggling umbrella boutique in the coastal town of Cherbourg, Normandy. Guy is a young auto mechanic who lives with and cares for his sickly aunt and godmother Élise. The boutique is saved from bankruptcy when Roland Cassard, a kind, young, very wealthy Parisian jeweler, agrees to buy some of Madame Émery's jewelry. Though Madame Émery disapproves, Guy and Geneviève are deeply in love; they plan to marry and name their first child Françoise. At the same time, Madeleine, a quiet young woman who looks after Élise, is secretly in love with Guy. Guy is drafted to serve in the Algerian War. The night before he leaves, he and Geneviève pledge their undying love and have sex.

=== Part Two: The Absence (January–April 1958) ===
Geneviève learns she is pregnant and writes to Guy, but his replies are sporadic. Her mother tells her that Guy has forgotten her and she should move on. Geneviève is courted by Roland, who wants to marry her despite her pregnancy. In one of the connections among Demy's trilogy of films, Roland had previously unsuccessfully wooed the title character in the earlier Lola (1961); now he relates a version of this story to Madame Émery. Madame Émery urges Geneviève to choose a secure future with Roland. Roland announces that he will be going to Amsterdam for three months, and will wait for Geneviève's answer until his return. Upon his return Geneviève marries him in a great cathedral, but she appears ambivalent about her decision.

=== Part Three: The Return (March 1959 – December 1963) ===
Returning injured from the war, Guy learns that Geneviève has married and left Cherbourg. He has a difficult time readjusting to civilian life. After an argument with his boss at the garage, he quits his job, goes drinking in a seedy bar, and spends the night with a prostitute. When he returns to his apartment, Madeleine tells him that Élise has died. Guy sees that Madeleine loves him, and he rebuilds his life with her help. Using his inheritance, he opens a new American-style gas station. Madeleine agrees to marry him, though she wonders whether he is merely on the rebound after losing Geneviève.

Four years later, on a snowy Christmas Eve, Guy and Madeleine are in the office of their gas station with their small son François. As Madeleine and François leave to visit Santa Claus, a now wealthy Geneviève and her daughter Françoise arrive. Guy invites Geneviève into the station's office, where she reveals this is her first time in Cherbourg since her marriage. When asked if he wants to meet his daughter, Guy declines. On her way out, Geneviève looks back at Guy one last time before driving off. Madeleine returns with François, and Guy greets her with a kiss.

== Cast ==
- Catherine Deneuve as Geneviève Émery
- Nino Castelnuovo as Guy Foucher
- Anne Vernon as Madame Émery
- Marc Michel as Roland Cassard
- Ellen Farner as Madeleine
- Mireille Perrey as Aunt Élise
- Jean Champion as Aubin
- Pierre Caden as Bernard
- Jean-Pierre Dorat as Jean
- Dorothée Blanck as girl in café
- Jane Carat as Ginny
- Harald Wolff as M. Dubourg, jeweler
- Jean-Pierre Chizat as Pierre (uncredited)
- Gisèle Grandpré as Madame Germaine (uncredited)
- Hervé Legrand as François (uncredited)
- Rosalie Varda as Françoise (uncredited)

=== Singing voices ===
- Danielle Licari as Geneviève Émery
- José Bartel as Guy Foucher
- Christiane Legrand as Madame Émery
- Georges Blaness as Roland Cassard
- Claudine Meunier as Madeleine
- Claire Leclerc as Aunt Élise
- Michel Legrand as Jean

=== English dub ===
- José Bartel as Guy Foucher
- Monique Aldebert as Madame Émery
- Louis Aldebert as Roland Cassard
- Claudine Meunier as Madeleine
- Claire Leclerc as Aunt Élise

== English dub production ==
The English dub was done by Oscar Films.

The English adaptation of the songs was produced by Jacqueline Porel and Bruce Johansen.

The English dub was broadcast several times in the USA, on different channels. So far, the only identified VHS release is a Chinese one (early 90s).

The existence of a 16 mm print proves that there were also cinema releases.

This dub has never been released on DVD.

== Framing ==
Umbrellas is the middle film in an informal "romantic trilogy" of Demy films that share some of the same actors, characters, and overall look; it comes after Lola (1961) and before The Young Girls of Rochefort (1967).

== Music ==
The continuous music score and the brightly coloured photography had much to do with the popularity of this film. Formally the work is operatic, with the plot advanced entirely through dialogue sung with accompanying music. The colour photography is bright and vivid. The whole is united by an orchestral score of simple rhythms and tunes that are integrated with the story covering five years.

Since the cast were not trained singers, most of the actors' voices were dubbed and lipsynced.

The film score established composer Michel Legrand's reputation in Hollywood. He later scored other films, winning three Oscars. In North America, two of the film's songs became hits and were recorded by many artists: "I Will Wait for You" (the main theme, also known as "Devant le garage") and "Watch What Happens" (originally "Recit de Cassard", "Cassard's Story"). Both were given new English lyrics by lyricist Norman Gimbel.

"Watch What Happens" was covered by artists such as Tony Bennett, Ed Ames, and jazz pianists Oscar Peterson and Vince Guaraldi.

== Reception and legacy ==
The film was very successful in France, and was also shown internationally, introducing Deneuve to a larger audience. It was nominated for several Academy Awards, including for Best Foreign Film, Best Song, Best Soundtrack, and Best Original Screenplay. It won three awards at the 1964 Cannes Film Festival, including its top prize, the Palme d'Or. Jim Ridley has called Cherbourg "the most affecting of movie musicals, and perhaps the fullest expression of [Demy's] career-long fascination with the entwining of real life, chance, and the bewitching artifice of cinematic illusion."

The Umbrellas of Cherbourg was met with critical acclaim and is often regarded as one of the best musical films of all time. On the review aggregator website Rotten Tomatoes, the film holds an approval rating of 97% based on 72 reviews, with an average rating of 8.8/10. The website's critics consensus reads, "Jacques Demy elevates the basic drama of everyday life into a soaring opera full of bittersweet passion and playful charm, featuring a timeless performance from Catherine Deneuve." On Metacritic, it holds a weighted score of 86 out 100, based on 9 reviews indicating "universal acclaim".

In a review for Empire magazine, Kim Newman awarded the film 5/5 stars and praised the "depths of operatic emotion under the hum-along singspiel" delivered by the films leads. Nigel Andrews, writing for the Financial Times awarded the film 4 stars out of 5 calling the film "a body of work slim but exquisitely styled". Kevin Maher for The Times, in a review of a re-release of the film in 2019, also lauded the film, awarding it 5/5 stars. Significant praise has also been directed to the entirely sung-through nature of the film, with both James Berardinelli of ReelViews and Roger Ebert of the Chicago Sun-Times praising this aspect of the film in their reviews.

Stanley Kauffmann of The New Republic described The Umbrellas of Cherbourg as "tired material".

A restored digital version of Umbrellas of Cherbourg was shown as part of the Cannes Classics section of the 2013 Cannes Film Festival.

Filmmaker Damien Chazelle has listed it as one of his favorite films and a major influence on his 2016 film La La Land. Greta Gerwig cited the film as an inspiration for her 2023 film Barbie.

=== Accolades ===
- Prix Louis-Delluc, 1963
- Palme d'Or at the 1964 Cannes Film Festival
- Critics' prize for Best Film, by the French Syndicate of Film Critics, 1964
- Nominated for the Academy Award for Best Foreign Language Film at the 37th Academy Awards in 1965
- Nominated for four more Academy Awards at the 38th Academy Awards held in 1966, three for Legrand and Demy: Best Song (for "I Will Wait For You"), Best Original Score, Best Scoring - Adaptation or Treatment, and Best Screenplay Written Directly for the Screen. It did not win any.

== Stage adaptation ==
In 1979, an English-language stage adaptation, with lyrics translated by Sheldon Harnick, premiered at the Public Theater in New York City.

In 2005 a major revision by Harnick was produced at the Two River Theatre Company in Red Bank, New Jersey. Musical director/conductor Nathan Hurwitz provided new orchestration. The cast included Max von Essen as Guy, Heather Spore as Genevieve, and Maureen Silliman as Madame Émery. Other cast members included Ken Krugman, Patti Perkins, Robyn Payne, Jonathan Kaplan, Steven Stein Grainger, Brett Rigby, and Sara Delaney. Direction was by artistic director Jonathan Fox and choreography was by Ginger Thatcher.

In 2011, the Kneehigh Theatre Company in London presented the musical, starring Joanna Riding as Madame Émery, cabaret artist Meow Meow as the Maîtresse, and Andrew Durand as Guy. The production was directed by Emma Rice. It was given tryouts at Leicester's Curve Theatre from 11 to 26 February 2011 and began previews in the West End at the Gielgud Theatre from 5 March, officially opening on 22 March. It was due to run until October 2011, but closed on 21 May 2011.

The West End cast:

- Joanna Riding as Madame Émery
- Andrew Durand as Guy Foucher
- Dominic Marsh as Roland Cassard/Aunt Élise
- Laura Brydon as Ensemble
- Gareth Charlton as Dubourg/Sailor/Animator
- Chris Jenkins as Ensemble/Swing
- Meow Meow as Maîtresse
- Carly Bawden as Geneviève Émery
- Cynthia Erivo as Madeleine
- Matt Wilman as Sailor/Ensemble
- Aki Omoshaybi as Sailor/Animator
- Gillian Budd as Ensemble/Swing

== Restoration ==
The film version released in 2004 on DVD by Koch-Lorber Films is a completely restored version of the original.

The film was originally shot on Eastman negative stock, which had rapidly faded and thus had become almost unusable. The various copies of the film used in the cinema circuit gradually lost their quality. Umbrellas thus could not be seen with the rich colours which Demy had originally intended.

Knowing as he did that the Eastman stock would fade over time, Demy had made the three main yellow, cyan and magenta color separation masters on black-and-white negative films, which do not fade. These black-and-white separations had greater longevity. (Note: This process is not unique to this title, but it may be unique within French Eastmancolor-originated films. In the United States, separation masters are made, and have been made for nearly every Eastmancolor-originated title since about 1952. Additionally, so-called "low-fade" film is now used for making prints.)

In the 1990s, Demy's wife, film director Agnès Varda, headed a project to create a new colour-negative film from the three black and white separations. Restored full-color prints were made from this in 2004. The resulting film recaptured Demy's vision of a fantastically colourful Cherbourg.

Composer Michel Legrand assisted in restoring the original four-track stereo sound masters to digital. He remastered his score to produce a higher-quality version, released in 2014.

A digital version of the film was released on Blu-ray by Ciné Tamaris in 2013, on the 50th anniversary of its original release. This version was restored independently of the 2004 version with colour grading supervised by Demy's son Mathieu Demy.

A new 4K restoration of the film premiered at the 2024 Cannes Film Festival.

== Les Bicyclettes de Belsize ==
The title of the film inspired a musical short subject, released in 1969 and titled Les Bicyclettes de Belsize, which essentially parodied it. Douglas Hickox directed said short subject, and Les Reed and Barry Mason composed the music and wrote the lyrics to its title song, French and English versions of which charted in 1969 for Mireille Mathieu and Engelbert Humperdinck respectively.

== See also ==
- List of submissions to the 37th Academy Awards for Best Foreign Language Film
- List of French submissions for the Academy Award for Best Foreign Language Film
