= Run of the Arrow =

1957 film by Samuel Fuller

- Theatrical release poster
- Directed by: Samuel Fuller
- Written by: Samuel Fuller
- Produced by: Samuel Fuller
- Starring: Rod Steiger; Sara Montiel; Brian Keith; Charles Bronson
- Cinematography: Joseph Biroc
- Edited by: Gene Fowler Jr.
- Music by: Victor Young
- Production company: RKO Radio Pictures
- Distributed by: Universal Pictures
- Release date: July 25, 1957 (Premiere-Los Angeles)
- Running time: 86 minutes
- Country: United States
- Language: English

Run of the Arrow is a 1957 American Western film written, directed, and produced by Samuel Fuller and starring Rod Steiger, Sara Montiel, Brian Keith, Ralph Meeker, Jay C. Flippen, and Charles Bronson. Set at the end of the American Civil War, the movie was filmed in Technicolor.

== Plot summary ==
On the last day of the Civil War, Confederate soldier O'Meara shoots Driscoll, a Union lieutenant. After seeing that Driscoll is not dead, O'Meara takes him to a field hospital in nearby Appomattox and learns that Confederate General Robert E. Lee is in the process of surrendering to Union General Ulysses S. Grant. O'Meara snaps and tries to shoot Grant with his rifle, but is stopped by the doctor tending to Driscoll, who gives him the bullet removed from the lieutenant's wounds as a memento.

Returning to his home in Virginia, O'Meara rejects the pleas of his mother to put aside his hatred and settle down. O'Meara angrily renounces his identity as an American, declaring that for the rest of his life, he will be a "man without a country". He heads west, hoping to join with the Sioux nation and resume fighting the U.S. Army.

O'Meara finds travel in strange territory difficult until he meets Walking Coyote, an aging Oglala Sioux scout who speaks English and is heading back to his home tribe to die. The two travel together, with Walking Coyote teaching O'Meara the Sioux language and customs. They, however, are captured by a band of Sioux warriors led by Crazy Wolf, who is about to execute the pair when Walking Coyote invokes the right to the "run of the arrow", a ritual that could save their lives if they can endure a run marked by arrows flying in their path.

During the run, Walking Coyote is killed, but O'Meara is saved by a group of Sioux women, including Yellow Moccasin; he is presented to the tribe's chief, Blue Buffalo, and claims his right to live for surviving the run. Blue Buffalo gives O'Meara safe haven as he recovers, in part because of their mutual hatred of the Americans. Having fallen in love, O'Meara asks permission to be married with Yellow Moccasin, proclaiming, "In my heart, my nation is Sioux." When O'Meara points out the similarities between his Christian God and the Indians' Great Spirit, Blue Buffalo agrees and O'Meara becomes an active member of the tribe. The couple adopts a mute orphan boy, Silent Tongue, as their own son.

The Sioux leader Red Cloud negotiates a treaty with an American general named Allen for the troops to build Fort Lincoln within a prescribed area. O'Meara is assigned by the tribe to act as translator and scout for Allen's subordinate Captain Clark. Clark's second in command is Driscoll, who now shows a hatred of the Indians. O'Meara's own hostility to the "Yankees" is lessened, however, when, during the journey to the fort's site, a soldier gives his own life rescuing Silent Tongue from perishing in quicksand.

At the fort's site, the soldiers are ambushed by Crazy Wolf's war party and Clark is killed. O'Meara disarms Crazy Wolf but offers him the "run of the arrow" to spare his life. Driscoll, however, violates the ritual and shoots Crazy Wolf. Wounded, Crazy Wolf is taken back to his tribe by O'Meara. Taking command, Driscoll has his men move the fort's site to a location that is more strategic but violates the terms of the agreement with the Sioux. Blue Buffalo prepares to attack the fort but agrees to let O'Meara attempt to intercede with the soldiers. Driscoll takes O'Meara prisoner and prepares to hang him, and the enraged Indians slaughter most of his men and burn down the fort. Driscoll is captured and is about to be skinned alive when O'Meara, in an act of mercy, shoots him with the old bullet.

Yellow Moccasin says that, as O'Meara could not bear for Driscoll to be skinned alive, he is not a true Sioux - underlined by his referring to the Sioux warriors as "they" instead of "we". Realizing that he is still a man without a country, O'Meara guides his wife, son, and the surviving soldiers to resettle at Fort Laramie.

== Cast ==
- Rod Steiger as O'Meara
- Sara Montiel as Yellow Moccasin (as Sarita Montiel)
- Brian Keith as Capt. Clark
- Ralph Meeker as Lt. Driscoll
- Jay C. Flippen as Walking Coyote
- Charles Bronson as Blue Buffalo
- Olive Carey as Mrs. O'Meara
- H.M. Wynant as Crazy Wolf
- Neyle Morrow as Lt. Stockwell
- Frank DeKova as Red Cloud (as Frank De Kova)
- Tim McCoy as Gen. Allen (as Colonel Tim McCoy)
- Stuart Randall as Col. Taylor

== Production notes ==
Run of the Arrow was one of the first films to use blood squibs to simulate realistic bullets. The movie was filmed at Snow Canyon and Pine Valley Lake in St. George, Utah, which is far from actual Sioux territory.

Originally produced by RKO Radio Pictures, the studio ended its distribution activities before the movie was released. Universal Pictures handled the distribution.

Sara Montiel's voice is dubbed by Angie Dickinson.

At the time of its release, critics commented favorably on director Samuel Fuller's decision to concentrate on feet in the "run of the arrow" scene rather than showing the actors in full. Fuller later explained that Steiger had badly sprained his ankle just before the scene was to be shot and was unable to walk, so he had one of the Indian extras run in Steiger's place.

The movie is currently available through the Warner Archive Collection.

After Dances With Wolves was released in 1990, several knowledgeable critics, including Jeremy Arnold in the Los Angeles Times and Angela Aleiss in her essay for the Library of Congress' National Film Registry, noted that the plot was almost identical to this picture.
