= Desperate Mission (1965 film) =

- Directed by: Roberto Bianchi Montero
- Written by: Alfonso Balcázar; Roberto Bianchi Montero; Mario Colucci
- Starring: Germán Cobos
- Cinematography: Mario Bistagne
- Edited by: Bruno Mattei
- Music by: Francesco De Masi
- Release date: 1965
- Language: Italian

Desperate Mission (Italian: Agente Z 55 missione disperata, Spanish: Agente Z-55, misión Hong Kong, French: Agent Z-55, mission désespérée) is a 1965 Italian-Spanish-French Eurospy film directed by Roberto Bianchi Montero and starring Germán Cobos. It had a sequel in 1967, Blueprint for a Massacre.

== Plot ==
Nuclear scientist Larsen, captured by the Chinese, is rescued by US secret services. However, during the escape, Agent Z 51 is killed, and Larsen's whereabouts become unknown. Agent Z 55 is then sent to Hong Kong to finish the mission. The task is complicated by the fact that Larsen is also being pursued by a criminal organization seeking to deliver him to the Chinese authorities for a reward. With the assistance of a Chinese girl named Su-Ling, Z 55 manages to successfully rescue the scientist.

== Cast ==
- Germán Cobos as Robert Manning, Agent Z-55
- Yoko Tani as Su Ling
- Gianni Rizzo as Barrow
- Maria Luisa Rispoli as Sally
- Milton Reid as To-go
- Francisco Sanz as Professor Larsen
- Giovanni Cianfriglia as Barrow's Henchman
- Leontine May as Tania
- José Calvo as The Director of the company
