= Bardem =

Bardem (Spanish: [baɾˈðen], Catalan: [bəɾˈðɛm, baɾ-]) is a Spanish surname of Catalan origin. Notable people with the surname include:

- Carlos Bardem (born 1963), Spanish actor
- Javier Bardem (born 1969), Spanish actor
- Juan Antonio Bardem (1922–2002), Spanish screenwriter and film director
- Miguel Bardem (born 1964), Spanish screenwriter and film director
- Mónica Bardem (born 1964), Spanish actress
- Pilar Bardem (1939–2021), Spanish actress
- Rafael Bardem (1889–1972), Spanish actor
