= Comedians (1954 film) =

Cómicos
- Spanish DVD cover
- Directed by: Juan Antonio Bardem
- Written by: Juan Antonio Bardem
- Produced by: Eduardo Manzanos Brochero; Alberto Soifer
- Starring: Emma Penella; Fernando Rey; Elisa Galvé; Rosario García Ortega; Mariano Asquerino; Carlos Casaravilla; Manuel Alexandre
- Cinematography: Ricardo Torres
- Edited by: Antonio Gimeno
- Music by: Isidro B. Maiztegui; Jesus Franco; Manuel Parada
- Release date: 17 May 1954
- Running time: 88 minutes
- Country: Spain
- Language: Spanish

Comedians (Spanish: Cómicos) is a 1954 Spanish drama film directed by Juan Antonio Bardem. It was coproduced with Argentina in the context of its classical-industrial period, but it is a Spanish film about Spaniards actors on stage. Bardem confessed to being inspired by All About Eve. The film was entered into the 1954 Cannes Film Festival.

Bardem remade Cómicos as a musical in 1971, Variety starring Sara Montiel.

== Plot ==
Ana Ruiz (Elisa Christian Galvé) is a young and ambitious actress who has so far only had the opportunity to play secondary roles. But she finally gets her big chance to take on a leading role. The only condition set by businessman Carlos Márquez (Carlos Casaravilla) is that Ana becomes his lover. But she is in love with Miguel (Fernando Rey).

== Cast ==
- Elisa Galvé - Ana Ruiz (as Christian Galvé)
- Fernando Rey - Miguel
- Emma Penella - Marga
- Rosario García Ortega - Doña carmen
- Mariano Asquerino - Don Antonio
- Carlos Casaravilla - Carlos
- Rafael Alonso - Ernesto Blasco
- Manuel Arbó - Rafael Muñoz
- Matilde Muñoz Sampedro - Matilde Agustín
- Aníbal Vela - Empresario
