= Nadie oyó gritar =

No One Heard the Scream
- Theatrical release poster
- Directed by: Eloy de la Iglesia
- Screenplay by: Eloy de la Iglesia; Antonio Fos; Gabriel Moreno Burgos
- Starring: Carmen Sevilla; Vicente Parra; Tony Isbert
- Cinematography: Francisco Fraile
- Edited by: Antonio Ramírez de Loaysa
- Music by: Fernando García Morcillo
- Production company: Benito Perojo S.A./Picasa
- Release date: 27 August 1973
- Running time: 88 minutes
- Country: Spain
- Languages: Spanish; English
- Box office: ESP 10,820,846 (Spain)

No One Heard the Scream (Spanish: Nadie oyó gritar) is a 1973 Spanish horror film directed by Eloy de la Iglesia. The film stars two of the director’s favorite performers: Carmen Sevilla (from de la Iglesia's The Glass Ceiling) and Vicente Parra (from de la Iglesia's Cannibal Man). The plot follows a beautiful woman forced to help her neighbor after she sees him disposing the corpse of his wife on an elevator shaft. The film, daring for its time, was heavily edited by the Francoist censors.

The film explores some of Eloy de la Iglesia’s recurrent themes such as voyeurism, socialism, society's class system, and homoerotic imagery. Nadie oyó gritar is not strictly a horror film, but mixes genres: drama, black comedy, suspense, road movie, character study, psychological thriller and horror, with few jolts and bloody scenes.

== Plot ==
Elisa, a beautiful woman in her late thirties, changing her plans at the last minute, cancels her flight to London where she was going to meet her older lover. She is a professional mistress who finances a comfortable life style as the kept woman of old rich men. Óscar, her wealthy aging lover, has been supporting her financially (apartment, car, money, plane tickets) in exchange for one weekend a month of her time. When he calls her up to protest, Elisa ends their affair and hangs up the phone.

The building where Elisa lives in Madrid is almost empty for the weekend since, except for her next door neighbors, there are only offices. The other occupant is the half deaf meddlesome concierge. Alone in her apartment, Elisa takes a shower and wants to relax, but she begins to hear suspicious noises. She exits her apartment to investigate and finds her next-door neighbor, Miguel, dropping the freshly-killed body of his wife, Nuria, down an elevator shaft. Elisa runs back into her apartment and locks the door, but Miguel manages to cut off her phone line, leaving Elisa unable to call the police. Miguel breaks into Elisa's apartment through a window, brandishing a gun. Instead of killing her, Miguel decides to flip things around and turn Elisa into an accomplice. Unwillingly, Elisa is forced to help Miguel retrieve Nuria’s body from the elevator shaft. They wrap the dead woman up in Elisa’s shower curtain and put the cadaver in the trunk of Elisa’s car.

Knowing that Elisa has a vacation home and a boat by San Juan’s lake, near Madrid, Miguel decides to go there to dispose of the corpse sinking it in the water. As the two head toward their destination, they are stopped by the police. There has been an accident as a bus has gotten out of the road and as consequence there are many people severely injured. With not enough room in the ambulance to take the wounded, the police ask Miguel and Elisa to help transporting a seriously injured couple to a nearby hospital. In spite of the close call, the body on the trunk is not discovered. When they arrive at the hospital, Miguel and Elisa are told to wait and provide further information. They are told that the woman they were transporting in the car was already dead. Miguel becomes nervous, but it turns out that it was not his wife in the trunk, but the injured woman from the accident they were talking about. A strange bond starts growing between Elisa and Miguel. She seems willing to co-operate with her abductor. Miguel is attractive and charms her with his personality. He tells her that his dreams of becoming a successful writer never came to fruition and that instead he settled for marriage to a wealthy woman he didn't love.

They finally arrive at the lake and take Elisa's boat to the middle of the lake. Miguel sinks the body in the lake as planned, but Elisa manages to turn the tables on her abductor who falls into the water. She could easily kill him, but decides not to do it in the end. As they enter Elisa's house on the lake's shore, Miguel meets Tony, Elisa's own younger lover who she supports. A homoerotic tension is apparent between the two half naked men. Tony goes swimming, leaving Miguel and Elisa alone as the sexual attraction between Elisa and her abductor grows.

Elisa and Miguel come back to their apartment building in Madrid. At night, they go out together to a club carrying on an affair. At the club, they see Tony again. Elisa confesses that he is her lover. Nevertheless, attracted to Miguel, back in her apartment, she has sex with him. When she wakes up the next morning, she finds Miguel in her bed brutally killed. Initially Elisa does not know what had happened, but Nuria explains that she was not the woman whose body was thrown in the lake, that was actually Miguel's lover. Nuria confesses that while Elisa was sound sleep with the help of sleeping pills, she killed her unfaithful husband. As Elisa has now experience disposing of a body, Nuria asks her to help her which Elisa is willing to do.

== Cast ==
- Carmen Sevilla as Elisa
- Vicente Parra as Miguel
- Tony Isbert as Tony
- María Asquerino as Nuria
- Antonio Casas as Óscar
- Goyo Lebrero as Porter

== Home Media ==
Nadie oyó gritar is available in Region 2 DVD, with audio in Spanish. There is no Region 1 DVD available.

On August 21st, 2021, Severin released a Blu-ray of the film, featuring an HD scan of the original negative and an interview with film scholar Dr. Andy Willis.
