= Alfonso XII and María Cristina =

1960 film

- Spanish theatrical release poster
- Spanish: ¿Dónde vas triste de ti?
- Directed by: Alfonso Balcázar; Guillermo Cases
- Screenplay by: Juan Ignacio Luca de Tena; Luis Marquina; Miguel Cussó
- Produced by: Alfonso Balcázar; Francisco Balcázar; Eduardo Manzanos Brochero
- Starring: Vicente Parra; Marga López; José Marco Davó; Marta Padovan; Tomás Blanco; María Fernanda Ladrón de Guevara
- Cinematography: José F. Aguayo
- Edited by: Sara Ontañón
- Music by: Guillermo Cases
- Color process: Eastmancolor
- Production company: Balcázar Producciones Cinematográficas
- Release date: 17 April 1960
- Running time: 99 minutes
- Country: Spain
- Language: Spanish

Alfonso XII and María Cristina or Where Are You Going, Sad Man? (Spanish: ¿Dónde vas triste de ti?) is a 1960 Spanish historical drama film directed by Alfonso Balcázar and Guillermo Cases and starring Vicente Parra and Marga López as Alfonso XII of Spain and his second wife Maria Christina of Austria.

The film is the sequel to Where Are You Going, Alfonso XII? with Vicente Parra, José Marco Davó and Tomás Blanco reprising their roles from the previous film as Alfonso XII, Antonio Cánovas del Castillo and the Duque de Sesto respectively. María Fernanda Ladrón de Guevara replaced Mercedes Vecino as Isabella II.

Similar in style to the German Sissi film series, it was very popular but led to Vicente Parra's typecasting.

The film's sets were designed by the art director Enrique Alarcón.

== Cast ==
- Vicente Parra as Alfonso XII
- Marga López as María Cristina
- José Marco Davó as Antonio Cánovas del Castillo
- Marta Padovan as Infanta Isabel
- Tomás Blanco as Duque de Sesto
- María Fernanda Ladrón de Guevara as Isabella II
- Ana María Custodio as Duquesa de Montpensier
- Francisco Arias
- Rafael Bardem as Doctor Federico Rubio y Galí
- Rosita Yarza
- Mario Morales
- María Dolores Cabo
- Antonio Jiménez Escribano
- Felip Peña
- Manuel Insúa
- José Sepúlveda as Damián
- Josefina Serratosa
- José Morales
- Consuelo de Nieva
- Carolina Jiménez
- Mario Bustos
- José Vidal
- Salvador Muñoz
- Mario Beut
- Rafael Calvo
- Gonzalo Medel
- Amalia Sánchez Ariño
- Ramón Hernández
- Marta Novar
- Alejo del Peral
- Carmen Aroca
- Juan Eulate as Novaleches
- Camino Delgado
- Julia Pachelo
- José Cuenca
- Carmen Lozano
- Lolita de Málaga
- Manuel Ausensi
- Miguel Aguerri

== Bibliography ==
- Mira, Alberto. Historical Dictionary of Spanish Cinema. Scarecrow Press, 2010.
