= Vicente Parra =

Spanish actor (1931–1997)

- Born: Vicente Parra Collado; 5 February 1931; Oliva (Valencia), Spain
- Died: 2 March 1997 (aged 66); Madrid, Spain
- Occupation: Actor

Vicente Parra Collado (Note: In this Spanish name, the first or paternal surname is Parra and the second or maternal family name is Collado.) (5 February 1931 – 2 March 1997) was a Spanish actor.

== Early career ==
Born in Oliva (Valencia), in a lower-class family, he began his career at a young age in the theater. He formed part of a number of theatrical companies. He made his film debut at age eighteen with the film Rumbo (Heading) (1949) in a small role. He became famous with the thriller film El expreso de Andalucía (The Andalusian express) (1956) under the direction of Francisco Rovira Beleta. He then put his work in the theater in the background to concentrate in pursuing a career in films. He made two films directed by Mauel Mur Otis: Fedra (1956), an adaptation of the classical play, and the melodrama El batallón de las sombras (1957). The same year he starred in Rapsodia de sangre (1957) a film directed by Antonio Isasi-Isasmendi about the Hungarian Revolution of 1956.

== Success ==
Vicente Parra achieved his biggest success with the film ¿Dónde vas Alfonso XII? (Where Are You Going, Alfonso XII?) (1958), under the direction of Luis César Amadori, a film in which he played the eponymous king while the singer Paquita Rico played Queen Mercedes. Two years later, he reprised the role in the film's sequel ¿Dónde vas, triste de ti? (Where are you going sad man) ? (1960) in which the Mexican actress Marga López, took the role of Queen María Cristina, Archduchess of Austria. Both films, inspired by the "Empress Sissi" trilogy of films (fictional treatments of the life of Empress Elisabeth of Austria), were highly sentimental and typecast him. His popularity declined afterwards.

In the following years Parra starred in the musical Nobleza baturra (Aragonese nobility) (1965) and he mixed his work in the theater, where he formed his own company, with edgier parts in films like: Varietés (Variety) (1971) under the direction of Juan Antonio Bardem. He left behind his image as a handsome leading man with two horror films for controversial director Eloy de la iglesia: La Semana del Asesino (The Cannibal Man) (1972) and Nadie oyó gritar (Nobody hear the Scream)(1973). In La Semana del asesino, he played a working class serial killer who put his victims through the grinder at a meat factory.

== Later career ==
After these films, Parra's career never took off again. For a couple of years, he lived and worked in Argentina. Back in Spain, his works were spaced out appearing in brief iconic parts in films like: Las Largas vacaciones del 36 ( The long vacations of 1936) (1976) directed by Jaime Camino; La siesta (The nap) (1976), directed by Jorge Grau; the comedy Nosotros que fuimos tan felices (We who were so happy) (1976), directed by Antonio Drove and La Guerra de Papá (Dad's war) (1977) (an adaptation of Miguel Delibe's novel El príncipe destronado) under the direction of Antonio Mercero.

During the first part of the 1980s, Vicente Parra retired for a decade from acting both in films and theater. He came back to the big screen with secondary roles in two films directed by José Luis García Sánchez: Suspiros de españa y Portugal (Sights of Spain and Portugal) (1995), a black comedy, and Tranvía a la Malvarrosa (Streetcar to the Malvarosa) (1997), which was his last film. He died, age 66, of lung cancer.

== Partial filmography ==
- Flight 971 (1953) - Rafael Azarías
- Manicomio (1954) - Alejo
- The Fisher of Songs (1954) - Pretendiente de María del Mar
- La patrulla (1954) - Matías hijo
- Cancha vasca (1955) - Chano
- Andalusia Express (1956) - Miguel Hernández
- Fedra (1956) - Fernando
- The Battalion in the Shadows (1957) - Carlos, pintor
- Classe di ferro (1957) - Gianni
- Rapsodia de sangre (1958) - Pulac Andras
- Bread, Love and Andalusia (1958) - Paco
- Where Are You Going, Alfonso XII? (1959) - Alfonso XII
- Los cobardes (1959) - Juan
- Un mundo para mí (1959) - Andre
- Vacations in Majorca (1959) - Gianni
- Alfonso XII and María Cristina (1960) - Alfonso XII
- Darling (1961) - Miguel - Michael
- The Fair of the Dove (1963) - Majestad (uncredited)
- La verbena de la Paloma (1963) - Julián
- Aragonese Nobility (1965) - Sebastián
- Cotolay (1965) - Francisco de Asís
- Las locas del conventillo (1966) - Manolo
- Good Morning, Little Countess (1967) - Ramiro
- The Partisan of Villa (1967) - Capitán Pablo Márquez
- Sábado en la playa (1967)
- Variety (1971) - Miguel Solís
- The Cannibal Man (1972) - Marcos
- No One Heard the Scream (1973) - Miguel
- El juego del adulterio (1973) - John
- Yo fui el rey (1975) - Carlos Mendoza
- Long Vacations of 36 (1976) - Paco
- Nosotros que fuimos tan felices (1976) - Miguel Miranda
- La siesta (1976) - Luis
- El espiritista (1977) - Alberto
- La guerra de papá (1977) - Emilio
- La Raulito en libertad (1977) - El productor
- El transexual (1977) - Eduardo
- El último guateque (1978) - El cura
- El hombre que yo quiero (1978) - Eduardo
- Cariño mío, ¿qué me has hecho? (1979) - Jorge / Rosa's husband
- Semilla de muerte (1980) - Martín
- La leyenda del tambor (1981) - Antoni Frac
- Cuando Almanzor perdió el tambor (1984) - Sancho Parra
- El último penalty (1984) - Don Juanjo
- Cartas desde Huesca (1993) - Médico
- Dos hombres y una mujer (1994)
- Suspiros de España (y Portugal) (1995) - Villalba
- Tramway to Malvarrosa (1996) - Padre Cáceres (final film role)
