= Matilde Muñoz Sampedro =

Spanish actress (1900–1969)

- Born: Matilde Muñoz Sampedro; 2 March 1900; Madrid, Spain
- Died: 14 April 1969 (aged 69); Madrid, Spain
- Occupation: Actress
- Years active: 1943–1969
- Spouse: Rafael Bardem (m. 1918)
- Children: Juan Antonio Bardem; Pilar Bardem
- Relatives: Guadalupe Muñoz Sampedro (sister); Mercedes Muñoz Sampedro (sister)

Matilde Muñoz Sampedro (2 March 1900 – 14 April 1969) was a Spanish film actress whose career stretched from the 1940s through the 1960s.

== Biography ==
Muñoz was married to actor Rafael Bardem and the couple had two children: Juan Antonio and Pilar. Her grandchildren are Carlos, Mónica, and Javier. Muñoz was born in Madrid in 1900 and her sisters, Guadalupe and Mercedes, were both actresses. She died in Madrid.

== Filmography ==
=== Television ===
Muñoz starred in one episode each of Teatro de familia and Escuela de maridos, both in 1964.

=== Film ===
Year	Title (original)	Title (trans.)	Role	Ref.
1944	Tuvo la culpa Adán	It's Your Fault, Adam	Madre Clotilde	
1945	La luna vale un millón	The Moon is Worth a Million (lit.)	Tina	
1947	Por el gran premio	For the Grand Prize (lit.)		
1947	Nada	Nada		
1947	Luis Candelas, el ladrón de Madrid	Luis Candelas		
1948	Revelación	Revelation (lit.)		
1949	Siempre vuelven de madrugada	They Always Return at Dawn	Maruja	
1950	La revoltosa	The Troublemaker	Gorgonia	
1950	Yo no soy la Mata-Hari	I'm Not Mata Hari	Woman in restaurant	
1951	Cuento de hadas	Fairytale (lit.)	Second woman	
1951	La señora de Fátima	Our Lady of Fatima	Andrea	
1952	Habitación para tres	A Room for Three	Carlota, madre de Alicia	
1952	Facultad de letras	Department of Literature (lit.)	Bookseller	
1952	Sor intrépida	The Song of Sister Maria	Superiora del Vicariato (uncredited)	
1953	Puebla de las mujeres	Women's Town		
1953	Cabaret	Cabaret	Woman at table	
1953	Aquel hombre de Tánger	That Man from Tangier	Woman with puppy	
1953	Esa pareja feliz	That Happy Couple	Amparo	
1954	Cómicos	Comedians	Matilde Agustín	
1954	Felices Pascuas	Merry Christmas	Sister Traspunte	
1955	El indiano	The Indian (lit.)	Edelmira	
1955	Muerte de un ciclista	Death of a Cyclist	Neighbor of cyclist	
1955	El tren expreso	The Express Train (lit.)	Tía Amparo	
1955	El guardián del paraíso'	The Guardian of Paradise (lit.)	Mujer castiza	
1955	Señora ama	The Lady of the House	Doña Rosa	
1955	La pícara molinera	The Miller's Saucy Wife	Scribe	
1955	El canto del gallo	The Cock Crow	Elena	
1956	Calle Mayor	Main Street	Chacha	
1956	Manolo guardia urbano	Manolo, Urban Guard (lit.)	Angustias	
1956	Minutos antes	Minutes Before (lit.)		
1956	El fenómeno	The Phenomenon (lit.)	President of the Association of Educated Women	
1956	La mestiza	The Mestiza (lit.)	Doña Lola	
1956	Un traje blanco	Miracle of the White Suit	Madre	
1956	Piedras vivas	Living Stones (lit.)	Complaining woman	
1957	Los maridos no cenan en casa	Husbands Don't Eat Dinner at Home (lit.)	Doña Ruperta	
1957	El último cuplé	The Last Torch Song	Paca	
1957	Faustina	Faustina	Madre de Nieves	
1957	El anónimo	The Anonymous (lit.)		
1957	La guerra empieza en Cuba	The War Starts in Cuba	Tía	
1957	La cenicienta y Ernesto	Cinderella and Ernest (lit.)	Rosario	
1958	Historias de Madrid	Stories from Madrid	Matilde	
1958	Ya tenemos coche	We Already Have a Car (lit.)	Woman	
1958	La mina	The Mine		
1958	Aquellos tiempos del cuplé	Those Times of the Cuplé (lit.)	Micaela	
1958	Muchachas en vacaciones	Girls on Vacation (lit.)	Client	
1958	La vida por delante	The Life Ahead	Doña Encarna	
1958	Una mujer para Marcelo	The Inveterate Bachelor	Madre de Gina	
1958	La muchacha de la plaza de San Pedro	The Girl of San Pietro Square	Assunta	
1959	Charlestón	Charleston	Doña Ubalda	
1959	El cerro de los locos	The Hill of Fools (lit.)	Old woman	
1959	Salto a la gloria	Leap to Fame	Animal seller	
1959	Sonatas	Sonatas	Candelaria	
1959	La casa de la Troya	College Boarding House	Nun #1	
1959	Carretera general	Main Road (lit.)		
1960	Juicio final	Final Judgement (lit.)		
1960	Toro bravo	Fighting Bull (cul.)	Madre de Lucía	
1960	Siempre en la arena	Always in the Sand (lit.)		
1960	El hombre que perdió el tren	The Man Who Missed the Train (lit.)	Doña Mónica	
1960	Un ángel tuvo la culpa	An Angel Was to Blame (lit.)	Señora Casilda	
1960	Amor bajo cero	Love Below Zero (lit.)	Doña Remedios	
1960	Melocotón en almíbar	Peaches in Syrup	Doña Pilar	
1961	Siega verde	Green Harvest		
1961	Don José, Pepe y Pepito	Don José, Pepe and Pepito (lit.)	Widow	
1961	Julia y el celacanto	Julia and the Latimeria (lit.)	Sebastián's wife	
1961	Cariño mío	Darling	Escort	
1961	Despedida de soltero	Bachelor Party (lit.)	Doña Antonia	
1962	Martes y trece	Martes and 13 (lit.)	Juana	
1962	Canción de juventud	Song of Youth		
1962	Melodías de hoy	Today's Melodies	Doña Carmelita	
1962	Tú y yo somos tres	You and Me Are Three	Tía de Manolina	
1963	Han robado una estrella	They Have Stolen a Star (lit.)	Obdulia	
1963	Noches de Casablanca	Casablanca, Nest of Spies	Isabel	
1963	La revoltosa	The Troublemaker	Encarna	
1963	Suspendido en sinvergüenza	Suspended in Shamelessness (lit.)	Madre de Rosa	
1963	Un demonio con ángel	A Devil With an Angel (lit.)	Trini	
1963	Pacto de silencio	Silence Pact (lit.)	Madre de Isabel	
1963	Nunca pasa nada	Nothing Ever Happens	Doña Obdulia	
1964	La chica del gato	The Cat Girl (lit.)	Eufrasia	
1964	Un balcón sobre el infierno	Web of Fear		
1964	El pecador y la bruja	The Sinner and the Witch	Madre de Mariana	
1964	Rueda de sospechosos	Wheel of Suspects (lit.)	Patrona de Rafael	
1964	El señor de La Salle	Who Are My Own	Sor Luisa	
1964	El inquilino	The Tenant	Daniela	
1965	Suena el clarín	The Bugel Sounds	Madre del torero	
1966	Las últimas horas...	The Final Hours... (lit.)	Madre de Isidro	
1966	El arte de no casarse	The Art of Not Getting Married (lit.)	Señorita Bienvenida	
1967	La isla de la muerte	Maneater of Hydra	Myrtle Callahan	
1967	Encrucijada para una monja	A Nun at the Crossroads	Sister Herminia	
1968	Si volvemos a vernos	Smashing Up	Tía	
1969	Esa mujer	That Woman (lit.)	Eduarda Rodríguez	
1969	Mi marido y sus complejos	My Husband and His Complexes (lit.)		
1969	Hamelín	A Happening in Hamelin	Gertrudis	
1969	Bohemios	Bohemians (lit.)	Pelagia	
1969	Un adulterio decente	A Decent Adultery	Magdalena	
1969	Del amor y otras soledades	Love and Other Solitudes	Madre de María	
1970	El último día de la guerra	The Last Day of the War	Housekeeper	
