= Tomás Blanco (actor) =

Spanish actor

- Born: Tomás Blanco García; 10 November 1910; Bilbao, Spain
- Died: 16 July 1990 (aged 79); Madrid, Spain
- Occupation: Actor
- Years active: 1942–1983

Tomás Blanco García (10 November 1910 – 16 July 1990) was a Spanish film actor. He appeared in more than 140 films between 1942 and 1983. He was born in Bilbao, Spain and died in Madrid, Spain.

== Selected filmography ==
- A Famous Gentleman (1943) – Don Álvaro
- Mariona Rebull (1947) – Ernesto Villar
- Nada (1947) – Juan Brunet
- Four Women (1947) – soldado enamorado de Blanca
- Amanhã Como Hoje (1948) – Arturo
- Guest of Darkness (1948) – Míster Arlen
- Las aguas bajan negras (1948) – Sergio, el pagador
- El verdugo (1948)
- Just Any Woman (1949) – Marido de Nieves (uncredited)
- Wings of Youth (1949) – Capitán Rueda
- El santuario no se rinde (1949) – Capitán Cortés
- Pequeñeces... (1950)
- The Troublemaker (1950) – Don Leo
- Tormented Soul (1950)
- I'm Not Mata Hari (1950) – Richard disfrazado (uncredited)
- El pasado amenaza (1950)
- Apartado de correos 1001 (1950) – Antonio Benítez
- La fuente enterrada (1950) – Raúl
- El señorito Octavio (1950) – Carlos
- The Floor Burns (1952) – Rafael
- The Call of Africa (1952) – Alfajeme
- La Laguna Negra (1952) – Juan
- Pasaporte para un ángel (Órdenes secretas) (1954)
- La patrulla (1954) – El Señorito
- Los Hermanos corsos (1955)
- La cigüeña dijo sí (1955)
- Sangre y acero (1956)
- Faustina (1957) – Don José
- The Violet Seller (1958) – Alfonso
- Héroes del Aire (1958) – Ernesto
- Rapsodia de sangre (1958) – Ronzi
- Where Are You Going, Alfonso XII? (1959) – Duque de Sesto
- S.O.S., abuelita (1959)
- Legions of the Nile (1959) – Ovidio
- Pescando millones (1959)
- La fiel infantería (1960) – Coronel
- El amor que yo te di (1960) – Joven
- El hombre que perdió el tren (1960)
- Juanito (1960)
- The Little Colonel (1960) – Don Martín Alvear
- Alfonso XII and María Cristina (1960) – Don José Osorio, duque de Sesto
- One Step Forward (1960)
- La paz empieza nunca (1960)
- Ursus (1961)
- Revolt of the Mercenaries (1961) – Capitano Brann
- The Invincible Gladiator (1961) – Senior Conspirator
- Darling (1961) – Minister
- Madame (1961) – Le maréchal Augereau (uncredited)
- Los culpables (1962) – Pablo Ibáñez
- Cupido contrabandista (1962) – Jefe de la banda
- Rogelia (1962) – Capitán de Regulares
- Occidente y sabotaje (1962)
- El valle de las espadas (1963) – Don Nuño
- La pandilla de los once (1963) – Al Gómez
- Noches de Casablanca (1963) – André (uncredited)
- Gli invincibili sette (1963) – Panuzio
- The Secret of the Black Widow (1963) – (uncredited)
- The Troublemaker (1963) – Don Leo
- Pacto de silencio (1963) – Ministerio fiscal
- Heroes of the West (1964) – Mayor Ortes
- Fuera de la ley (1964)
- Black Angel of the Mississippi (1964) – Burton
- Alféreces provisionales (1964) – Capitán de la Academia
- Un tiro por la espalda (1964)
- El señor de La Salle (1964) – Tío de La Salle
- El salario del crimen (1965) – Sáez – el cajero
- Television Stories (1965) – Ricardo Elósegui
- Heroes of Fort Worth (1965) – Confederate General
- Los cuatreros (1965) – Coronel
- Más bonita que ninguna (1965) – Nemesio Ordóñez
- Espionage in Tangier (1965) – Professor Greff
- Agent 077: Mission Bloody Mary (1965)
- Muere una mujer (1965) – Juan de la Peña
- Agent 077 From the Orient with Fury (1965) – Auctioneer
- Mi canción es para ti (1965) – (uncredited)
- For a Few Dollars More (1965) – Tucumcari sheriff
- Posición avanzada (1966) – Comandante
- Special Mission Lady Chaplin (1966) – Commissario Soler
- The Sea Pirate (1966) – Le gouverneur Malartic
- Tonnerre sur l'océan Indien (1966) – Le gouverneur Malartic
- Querido profesor (1966)
- Fantasía... 3 (1966) – Diablo (segment "Los tres pelos del diablo")
- El hombre que mató a Billy el Niño (1967) – Peter – Helen's Uncle
- Le canard en fer blanc (1967) – (uncredited)
- Las cicatrices (1967) – Gabriel Segura
- Operation Delilah (1967) – Embajador inglés
- Operación cabaretera (1967) – Alejandro
- Pero... ¿en qué país vivimos? (1967) – Comisario
- 15 Scaffolds for a Murderer (1967) – Clark Benett
- Love in Flight (1967) – El Coronel
- Superargo and the Faceless Giants (1968) – Davies
- Agonizando en el crimen (1968) – Padre de Jean
- I Want Him Dead (1968) – Mac (uncredited)
- Los que tocan el piano (1968) – Don Aurelio
- El secreto del capitán O'Hara (1968) – Coronel Robert Patterson
- La dinamita está servida (1968) – Pablo
- 1001 Nights (1968) – Cassim
- Soltera y madre en la vida (1969) – Don Anselmo 'Patito'
- Juicio de faldas (1969) – Don Gonzalo Carranza
- I Must Abandon You (1969) – Bellini
- Tengo que abandonarte (1969)
- Susana (1969) – Don Adolfo
- Con ella llegó el amor (1970)
- The House That Screamed (1970) – Pedro Baldié
- The Locket (1970)
- The Complete Idiot (1970) – Basilio
- El último día de la guerra (1970) – Martin Truppe
- Los hombres las prefieren viudas (1970) – Detective privado
- Don Erre que erre (1970) – Don Tomás Briceño
- La orilla (1971) – Don Senén
- Las amantes del diablo (1971) – Dr. Donati
- Los corsarios (1971)
- Una chica casi decente (1971) – Inspector Ortiz
- Su le mani, cadavere! Sei in arresto (1971) – Mr. Carson
- La montaña rebelde (1971) – Don Alejandro
- Nothing Less Than a Real Man (1972) – Víctor Yáñez, padre de Julia
- Naked Girl Killed in the Park (1972) – Insurance Company Boss (uncredited)
- ¡Qué noche de bodas, chicas! (1972)
- Ricco the Mean Machine (1973)
- Vida conyugal sana (1974) – Zariquiegui
- Proceso a Jesús (1974) – Interprete de Caifás
- The King is the Best Mayor (1974) – Alcalde
- Solo ante el Streaking (1975) – Decano
- Adulterio a la española (1976) – Don Antonio
- El caballero de la mano en el pecho (1976)
- Batida de raposas (1976) – Jugador de póker
- Father Cami's Wedding (1979)
- The Autonomines (1983) – Embajador vasco
