= Valentín Tornos =

Spanish actor

- Born: Valentín Tornos López; 4 January 1901; Madrid, Spain
- Died: 19 September 1976 (aged 75); Madrid, Spain
- Occupation: Actor
- Years active: 1959-1976

Valentín Tornos López (4 January 1901 – 19 September 1976) was a Spanish film and television actor.

== Filmography ==
Year	Title	Role	Notes
1959	La copla andaluza		
1962	The Mustard Grain	Hombre en Venta flamenca	
1962	La gran familia	Hombre en el bar	
1963	Los Guerrilleros	Sacristán	
1963	The Executioner	Vendedor de libros	
1963	Los conquistadores del Pacífico		
1963	Llegar a más	Pepe	
1963	The Fair of the Dove	Vecino anciano	
1964	Como dos gotas de agua	Ujier	
1964	The Chosen Ones	Alquilador de trajes de luces	
1964	La historia de Bienvenido	Ladrón 2	
1964	La nueva Cenicienta		
1965	Búsqueme a esa chica	Camarero	Uncredited
1965	Jandro		
1965	Television Stories	Hombre al que no le gusta la sopa (1)	
1965	Más bonita que ninguna		
1965	The First Adventure	Maestro	
1965	Cabriola	Tabernero de Marbella	
1966	La ciudad no es para mí	Jeremías	
1966	La Barrera	Alcalde	
1966	Ringo e Gringo contro tutti		
1966	La busca		
1966	Amador	Hotelero en Aranjuez	
1966	The Wild Ones of San Gil Bridge		
1967	Good Morning, Little Countess		
1967	Un millón en la basura	Empleado servicio limpieza #3	
1967	Los chicos del Preu	Domingo, conserje del Colegio Mayor	
1968	El turismo es un gran invento	Párroco	
1968	Oscuros sueños de agosto	Tío de Ana	
1968	Si volvemos a vernos	Tío	
1969	Adiós Cordera	Fausto	
1969	Prisionero en la ciudad		
1969	Juicio de faldas	Secretario judicial	
1969	Las leandras	Porras	
1970	El alma se serena	Poncio	
1970	¡¡Se armó el belén!!	Genaro	
1970	Dele color al difunto	Usurero	
1970	Crimen imperfecto	Anciano	
1970	El bosque del lobo	Saludador	
1970	La Lola, dicen que no vive sola		
1971	Una chica casi decente	Bufanda	
1971	Las ibéricas F.C.	Padre de Piluca	
1971	The Rebellious Novice	Paciente	
1972	La cera virgen	Pascual, padre de María	
1972	El padre de la criatura	Amigo #1	
1972	La garbanza negra, que en paz descanse...	Don Ramiro	
1972	The House Without Frontiers	Eugenio Alonso	
1972	The Cannibal Man	Obrero	
1973	Don Quijote cabalga de nuevo	Baldomero Fernández, notario	
1974	Las correrías del Vizconde Arnau	Vizconde Arnau	

== Bibliography ==
- Peter Cowie & Derek Elley. World Filmography: 1967. Fairleigh Dickinson University Press, 1977.
