= Sonatas (film) =

- Directed by: Juan Antonio Bardem
- Written by: Ramón del Valle-Inclán (novels); Juan Antonio Bardem; Juan de la Cabada; José Revueltas
- Produced by: Federico Amérigo; Manuel Barbachano Ponce; Pedro Coll; Apolinar Rabinal; Carlos Velo; Guillermo F. Zúñiga
- Starring: María Félix; Francisco Rabal; Aurora Bautista
- Cinematography: Gabriel Figueroa; Cecilio Paniagua
- Edited by: Margarita de Ochoa; Carlos Savage
- Music by: Luis Hernández Bretón; Isidro B. Maiztegui
- Production companies: Barbachano Ponce; Producciones Barbachano; Unión Industrial Cinematográfica
- Distributed by: Ízaro Films
- Release date: 12 October 1959
- Running time: 103 minutes
- Countries: Mexico; Spain
- Language: Spanish

Sonatas is a 1959 Mexican-Spanish historical drama film directed by Juan Antonio Bardem and starring María Félix, Francisco Rabal and Aurora Bautista. It premiered at the Venice Film Festival. It is based on novels written by the Spanish author Ramón del Valle-Inclán.

The film's sets were designed by the art directors Francisco Canet and Gunther Gerszo. Some location shooting took place in Galicia as well as various locations around Mexico. The film was shot in Eastmancolor.

== Cast ==
- María Félix as La Niña Chole
- Francisco Rabal as Marqués Javier de Bradomín
- Aurora Bautista as Concha
- Fernando Rey as Capitán Casares
- Carlos Rivas as Juan Guzmán
- Ignacio López Tarso as Jefe de guerrilleros
- Carlos Casaravilla as Conde de Brandeso
- David Reynoso as Teniente Elizondo
- Nela Conjiu as Joven loca
- Manuel Alexandre as Teniente Andrade
- Ada Carrasco as Nana
- José Torvay as Segundo sargento
- Matilde Muñoz Sampedro as Candelaria
- Rafael Bardem as Juan Manuel Montenegro
- Enrique Lucero as Militar prisionero
- José María Prada as Molinero
- Micaela Castejón as Madre abadesa
- Manuel Dondé as Campesino
- Noé Murayama as Teniente Gaviño
- Xan das Bolas as Tercer centinela
- José Chávez as Primer sargento
- Manuel Peiró as Estudiante
- Manuel Arbó as Coronel
- Josefina Serratosa as Molinera
- Edmundo Barbero as Hermano Lope
- Porfiria Sanchíz as Bruja
- Roberto Meyer as Macario Salas, viejo prisionero
- Mario Berriatúa as El Rubio
- Rogelio 'Frijolitos' Jiménez Pons
- Rufino Inglés as Doctor
- Agustín Fernández as Guerrillero
- José Manuel Martín as Primer centinela

== Bibliography ==
- Scott L. Baugh. Latino American Cinema: An Encyclopedia of Movies, Stars, Concepts, and Trends. ABC-CLIO, 2012.
