= The Dancer and the Worker =

- Directed by: Luis Marquina
- Written by: Jacinto Benavente (play); Luis Marquina
- Starring: Roberto Rey; Ana María Custodio; Antoñita Colomé
- Cinematography: Henri Barreyre
- Edited by: Ángel del Río
- Music by: Francisco Alonso
- Production company: C.E.A.
- Distributed by: Hispania Tobis
- Release date: 21 May 1936
- Running time: 83 minutes
- Country: Spain
- Language: Spanish

The Dancer and the Worker (Spanish:El bailarín y el trabajador) is a 1936 Spanish comedy film directed by Luis Marquina and starring Roberto Rey, Ana María Custodio and Antoñita Colomé.

== Cast ==
- Roberto Rey as Carlos Montero
- Ana María Custodio as Luisa Romagosa
- Antoñita Colomé as Pilar
- José Isbert as Don Carmelo Romagosa
- Irene Caba Alba as Doña Rita
- Sad Person
- as Patricio
- Enrique Guitart as Pepe
- Mariano Ozores as Don Pablo
- Luchy Soto
- Pilar Soler
- Eva Arión
- Rosina Mendía
- Maruja Verge
- Mary Cruz
- Eva de Francisco
- Trinoche Tejada
- Pedro Hurtado
- Francisco Zabala
- M. Sáez de Heredia
- Francisco Carollo

== Bibliography ==
- Bentley, Bernard. A Companion to Spanish Cinema. Boydell & Brewer 2008.
