= Flight 971 =

1953 film by Rafael J. Salvia

- Directed by: Rafael J. Salvia
- Written by: Fernando Merelo; Francisco Naranjo; Rafael J. Salvia; Ricardo Toledo
- Starring: José Nieto; Germán Cobos; Antonio Casas
- Cinematography: Eloy Mella
- Edited by: Antonio Martínez
- Music by: Arturo Duo Vital
- Production companies: Atenea Films; Chamartín Producciones y Distribuciones
- Distributed by: Chamartín
- Release date: 27 December 1953
- Running time: 90 minutes
- Country: Spain
- Language: Spanish

Flight 971 (Spanish: Vuelo 971) is a 1953 Spanish drama film directed by Rafael J. Salvia and starring José Nieto, Germán Cobos and Antonio Casas.

The film's sets were designed by Antonio Simont. Some scenes were shot at Madrid's Barajas Airport.

== Cast ==
- José Nieto as Comandante Pedro Zubiri
- Germán Cobos as Primer oficial
- Antonio Casas as Giner
- Santiago Rivero as Radiooperador
- Raúl Cancio as Primer sobrecargo
- Antonio Ferrandis as Segundo sobrecargo
- Julia Martínez as Matilde
- Joan Capri as Camarero
- Enrique Diosdado as Emilio Fraga
- José Bódalo as Hugo Carrara
- Doris Duranti as Liliana Musso
- María Dolores Pradera as Mónica
- Xan das Bolas as Padre
- Carmen Cabajos as Madre
- Fernando Sanclemente as Niño
- Pilar Sanclemente as Niña
- Marisa de Leza as Hija del presidente Zavala
- Milagros Leal as Señora creyente
- Joaquín Roa as Eduardo Valenzuela
- Aníbal Vela as Concertista
- Adolfo Marsillach as Doctor
- Beatriz Aguirre as Enfermera
- Ángela Pla as Etelvina de Campollano y de Bernáldez de Carvajal
- Miguel Gómez as José García
- Maruchi Fresno as Carmen Valverde de Galván
- Otto Sirgo as Marcos Galván
- Adriano Domínguez as Hijo de la mujer enferma
- María Francés as Mujer enferma
- Nicolás D. Perchicot as Abuelito
- Carmen Rodríguez as Abuelita
- Mike Brendel as Mike Brendel 'El Tigre Americano'
- Juan Tena as Joven ateo
- Mateo Guitart as Lector
- Sergio Orta as Secretario 1
- Félix Dafauce as Secretario 2
- Marcelino Ornat as Sr. Solís
- Vicente Parra as Rafael Azarías

== Bibliography ==
- Bentley, Bernard. A Companion to Spanish Cinema. Boydell & Brewer 2008.
