= José Luis Sáenz de Heredia =

Spanish film director (1911–1992)

- Born: 10 April 1911; Madrid, Spain
- Died: 4 November 1992 (aged 81)
- Years active: 1934 – 1975

José Luis Sáenz de Heredia (10 April 1911 – 4 November 1992) was a Spanish film director. He was born in Madrid. His film Ten Ready Rifles was entered into the 9th Berlin International Film Festival.

== Filmography ==
- Patricio miró a una estrella (1934)
- Juan Simón's Daughter (1935)
- ¿Quién me quiere a mí? (1936)
- ¡A mi no me mire usted! (1941)
- Raza (1942)
- El Escándalo (1944)
- The Road to Babel (1945)
- El destino se disculpa (1945)
- Bambú (1945)
- Mariona Rebull (1947)
- Las aguas bajan negras (1948)
- La mies es mucha (1948)
- Don Juan (1950)
- The Eyes Leave a Trace (1952)
- Todo es posible en Granada (1954)
- Historias de la radio (1955)
- The Big Lie (1956)
- Faustina (1957)
- Diez fusiles esperan (1959)
- El Indulto (1960)
- The Reprieve (1961)
- The Mustard Grain (1962)
- Los derechos de la mujer (1963)
- The Fair of the Dove (1963)
- Franco, ese hombre (1964)
- Television Stories (1965)
- Fray Torero (1966)
- Pero... ¿en qué país vivimos? (1967)
- Relaciones casi públicas (1968)
- Juicio de faldas (1969)
- El taxi de los conflictos (1969)
- ¡Se armó el belén! (1969)
- Don Erre que Erre (1970)
- El alma se serena (1970)
- Me debes un muerto (1971)
- La Decente (1971)
- Los Gallos de la madrugada (1971)
- Proceso a Jesús (1973)
- Cuando los niños vienen de Marsella (1974)
- Solo ante el Streaking (1975)
