= Darling (1961 film) =

1961 film

- Directed by: Rafael Gil; Hans Grimm (uncredited)
- Written by: Manuel Tamayo; Antonio Abad Ojuel; Arturo Rígel; Rafael Gil
- Produced by: Juan Jesús Buhigas; José Cerdá Pérez; Eduardo Fayos Ballester; Franz Seitz
- Starring: Vicente Parra; Marianne Hold; Manolo Morán
- Cinematography: Cecilio Paniagua
- Edited by: Antonio Ramírez de Loaysa
- Music by: Gregorio García Segura
- Production companies: Buhigas Films; Thalia-Filmproduktion
- Distributed by: Neue Film Allianz (Germany) Buhigas Films (Spain)
- Release date: 13 October 1961
- Running time: 101 minutes
- Countries: Spain; West Germany
- Language: Spanish

Darling (German: Die Liebe ist ein seltsames Spiel, Spanish: Cariño mío) is a 1961 Spanish-West German comedy film directed by Rafael Gil and Hans Grimm, starring Vicente Parra, Marianne Hold and Manolo Morán.

== Cast ==
- Vicente Parra as Miguel - Michael
- Marianne Hold as Verónica - Veronika
- Manolo Morán as Don Ricardo Gravina
- Horst Frank as Alberto - Albert
- Mercedes Vecino as Duchess
- Lina Yegros
- Rafael Bardem as Miguel's Father
- José Luis Pellicena as Carlos - Karl
- Carl Wery as Minister Mayer
- Germaine Damar as Cristina - Christine
- Alfredo Mayo as Minister
- Tomás Blanco as Minister
- Matilde Muñoz Sampedro as Dama de compañía
- Cándida Losada as Reverend Mother
- Juan Cortés
- Ramón Elías
- Beni Deus
- Barta Barri as Revolutionary Leader
- Pilar Cano
- Marita Oberman
- José Franco as Pietro
- Marisol Ayuso
- Adela Calderón
- Vicente Bañó as Revolutionary
- Ángel Álvarez
- Pilar Baiza
- Julio Infiesta
- Mayte Arroyo
- Miguel del Castillo as Police Inspector

== Bibliography ==
- de España, Rafael. Directory of Spanish and Portuguese film-makers and films. Greenwood Press, 1994.
