= Green Harvest (1961 film) =

1961 film by Rafael Gil

- Spanish: Siega verde
- Directed by: Rafael Gil
- Written by: Rafael Gil; Manuel Salo; José Viros (novel)
- Produced by: Valentín Sallent
- Cinematography: Heinrich Gärtner; Cecilio Paniagua
- Music by: Xavier Montsalvatge
- Production company: Pirene Films
- Distributed by: Warner Brothers
- Release date: 1 February 1961
- Running time: 103 minutes
- Country: Spain
- Language: Spanish

Green Harvest (Spanish: Siega verde) is a 1961 Spanish film directed by Rafael Gil.

The film's set and art director was Enrique Alarcón.

== Cast ==
- Marta Angelat
- Rafael Bardem
- José María Caffarel
- María de los Ángeles Hortelano
- Luis Induni as Janot
- Carlos Larrañaga as Enric Pujalt
- Rafael López Somoza
- Guillermo Marín
- Matilde Muñoz Sampedro
- Luz Márquez
- Consuelo de Nieva
- Elvira Quintillá
- Pepe Rubio
- Jeanne Valérie as Jana
