= Good Morning, Little Countess =

- Directed by: Luis César Amadori
- Written by: Luis César Amadori; Jesús María de Arozamena
- Produced by: Luis Sanz
- Cinematography: Alejandro Ulloa
- Edited by: Antonio Ramírez de Loaysa
- Music by: José Torregrosa
- Production company: Cámara Producciones Cinematográficas
- Distributed by: Suevia Films
- Release date: 20 February 1967
- Running time: 118 minutes
- Country: Spain
- Language: Spanish

Good Morning, Little Countess (Spanish:Buenos días, condesita) is a 1967 Spanish musical comedy film directed by Luis César Amadori and starring Rocío Dúrcal, Vicente Parra and Gracita Morales. A man hires a woman to pretend to be a countess and pose as his girlfriend to impress his visiting parents.

== Cast ==
- Rocío Dúrcal as María
- Vicente Parra
- Gracita Morales
- Paquito Cano
- Aurora Redondo
- Ana María Custodio
- Carlos Casaravilla
- Antonio Riquelme
- Luis Morris
- Rafael Bardem
- Pilar Gómez Ferrer
- Juan Antonio Riquelme
- Jesús Guzmán
- Fernando Nogueras
- Nicolás D. Perchicot
- Josefina Serratosa
- Miguel Armario
- Valentín Tornos
- Pilar Bardem
- Pilar Gómez Redondo

== Bibliography ==
- Peter Cowie & Derek Elley. World Filmography: 1967. Fairleigh Dickinson University Press, 1977.
