= Vengeance (1958 film) =

- Theatrical release poster
- Directed by: Juan Antonio Bardem
- Written by: Juan Antonio Bardem
- Produced by: Cesáreo González; Manuel J. Goyanes
- Starring: Raf Vallone; Carmen Sevilla; Jorge Mistral; Manuel Alexandre; Fernando Rey
- Narrated by: Francisco Rabal
- Cinematography: Mario Pacheco
- Edited by: Margarita de Ochoa
- Music by: Isidro B. Maiztegui
- Release dates: 1958 (Cannes Film Festival); 16 February 1959
- Running time: 122 minutes
- Country: Spain
- Language: Spanish

Vengeance (Spanish: La venganza) is a 1958 Spanish drama film directed by Juan Antonio Bardem. It was co-produced with Italy, starring Italian Raf Vallone. Francisco Rabal narrates the film.

The film was shown at the 1958 Cannes Film Festival but not released in Spain until the following year. The film had serious troubles with Spanish censorship. Bardem even went to prison and it was an international scandal. It was nominated for the Academy Award for Best Foreign Language Film.

== Plot ==
Juan (Jorge Mistral) comes back to the village after being wrongly imprisoned for ten years. Alongside his sister Andrea (Carmen Sevilla), they plot revenge against Luis "el Torcido" (Raf Vallone), whom they believe caused their family's suffering. To execute their plan, they join a group of harvesters searching for work in the Castilian fields, where their enemy is also present as their leader.

== Cast ==
- Carmen Sevilla as Andrea Díaz
- Raf Vallone as Luis 'El Torcido'
- Jorge Mistral as Juan Díaz
- José Prada as Santiago 'El Viejo'
- Manuel Alexandre as Pablo 'El Tinorio'
- Manuel Peiró as Maxi 'El Chico'
- Conchita Bautista as Cantante
- José Marco Davó
- Rafael Bardem
- Maria Zanoli
- Xan das Bolas as Segador gallego
- Rufino Inglés
- Ángel Álvarez
- Goyo Lebrero
- José Riesgo

== Production ==
The movie faced censorship issues, including a ban on its original title "The Reapers" because it coincided with the name of the Catalan anthem. To avoid political controversy, the time frame of the story was shifted from the 1950s to 1935. Eventually, the setting was placed in 1931 to relieve the Republic of any blame for the characters' hardships.

Filming started on June 26, 1957, and wrapped up on September 29 of the same year.

== See also ==
- List of submissions to the 31st Academy Awards for Best Foreign Language Film
- List of Spanish submissions for the Academy Award for Best Foreign Language Film
