= Miracle of the White Suit =

1956 film by Rafael Gil

- Theatrical film poster
- Directed by: Rafael Gil
- Written by: Vicente Escrivá; Ramón D. Faraldo
- Produced by: Vicente Escrivá
- Starring: Miguel Gil; Miguel Ángel Rodríguez; Julia Martínez
- Cinematography: Cecilio Paniagua
- Edited by: José Antonio Rojo
- Music by: Jesús Guridi
- Production companies: Aspa Producciones Cinematográficas; Lux Film
- Distributed by: As Films
- Release date: 26 November 1956
- Running time: 93 minutes
- Countries: Italy; Spain
- Language: Spanish

Miracle of the White Suit (Italian: Il grande giorno, Spanish: Un traje blanco) is a 1956 Italian-Spanish drama film directed by Rafael Gil and starring Miguel Gil, Miguel Ángel Rodríguez and Julia Martínez.

== Plot ==
The film recounts the tearful adventures of a poor boy when it comes to getting a white suit to make his first communion.

== Cast ==
- Miguel Gil as Marcos
- Miguel Ángel Rodríguez as Polonio
- Julia Martínez as Rosa
- Julio Núñez as José
- José Isbert as Alcalde
- Luis Induni as Andrés
- Carlos Miguel Solá
- Rafael Bardem as Damián
- Margarita Robles as Doña Antonia
- Nicolás D. Perchicot as Ramírez
- Matilde Muñoz Sampedro as mother
- José Ramón Giner as Maestro
- Julio Goróstegui as Antonio
- José Manuel Martín as player
- Ángel de Echenique as Director of the newspaper
- Julio F. Alymán
- José Calvo as Ramón
- Daja-Tarto as himself
- Dolores Villaespesa
- José María Rodríguez
- Rafael Calvo Revilla
- Mario Morales
- Julio Marqués
- Ángel Álvarez as Tabernero
- Mario Moreno
- Pedro Carrión
- María Teresa Arburu
- Antonio Martínez
- José Cuenca
- José Luis Trigo
