= Antonio Ferrandis =

Spanish actor (1921–2000)

- Antonio Ferrandis as Chanquete, 1981
- Born: Antonio Ferrandis Monrabal; 28 February 1921; Paterna (Valencia), Spain
- Died: 16 October 2000 (aged 79); Valencia, Spain
- Occupation: Actor

Antonio Ferrandis Monrabal (28 February 1921 – 16 October 2000) was a Spanish actor, remembered especially for the role of Chanquete in the Spanish television series Verano azul.

== Biography ==
Born on 28 February 1921 in Paterna, province of Valencia, after the Spanish Civil War he was a teacher since he began his studies in teaching, although his true passion would be the theatre His first role on stage was in Oedipus, co-starring with Francisco Rabal in 1950. In his younger days highlighted in several films. Years later was one of the great protagonists of Spanish cinema. Known for playing Chanquete in the television series Verano azul in 1981. He died on 16 October 2000 in Valencia Chiron hospital at 79 years old. Ten years after his death, on 15 October 2010, his home town, Paterna, paid homage to a documentary of his life in the theater that bears his name.

== Selected filmography ==
- Flight 971 (1953)
- The Fair of the Dove (1963)
- Sor Citroën (1967)
- Variety (1971)
- La descarriada (1973) as Ángela's father
- Sex o no sex (1974)
- 7 morts sur ordonnance (1975)
- El calor de la llama (1976)
- Begine the beguine (1982)
- Romanza final (Gayarre) (1986)

== Awards ==
- Generalitat Valenciana: Cultural Merit Award.
- Council of Ministers: Gold Medal for Merit in Fine Arts.
- National Theatre Award.
