= Nothing Less Than a Real Man =

1972 film

- Spanish: Nada menos que todo un hombre
- Directed by: Rafael Gil
- Written by: Rafael Gil; Miguel de Unamuno
- Cinematography: José F. Aguayo
- Music by: Manuel Parada
- Production company: Coral Producciones Cinematográficas
- Distributed by: Paramount Films de España
- Release date: 14 February 1972
- Running time: 95 minutes
- Country: Spain
- Language: Spanish

Nothing Less Than a Real Man (Spanish: Nada menos que todo un hombre) is a 1972 Spanish drama film directed by Rafael Gil and starring Analía Gadé, Francisco Rabal and Ángel del Pozo. It is based on Miguel de Unamuno's 1916 novel of the same name.

== Cast ==
- Analía Gadé as Julia Yáñez
- Francisco Rabal as Alejandro Gómez
- Ángel del Pozo as Gabriel
- José María Seoane
- Tomás Blanco as Víctor Yáñez, Julia's father
- Lola Lemos as Julia's mother
- Mabel Karr as Berta
- Rafael Hernández as Encargado casa del campo
- Irene Daina
- Erasmo Pascual as Don Rosendo
- José Franco as priest
- Jesús Guzmán as notary
- Beni Deus as Socio del Casino
- Manuel Tejada as Julia's suitor
- Ricardo Tundidor as Enrique
- Nélida Quiroga
- Vicente Roca
- Rosa Fontana
- Bárbara Lis
- Luis Rico
- Antonio Cintado as Gustavo
- Ángel Menéndez
- Carmen Martínez Sierra as Mujer en la iglesia
- Ricardo Palacios as Socio del casino
