= La isla misteriosa y el capitán Nemo =

- Based on: The Mysterious Island by Jules Verne
- Written by: Juan Antonio Bardem; Henri Colpi
- Directed by: Juan Antonio Bardem; Henri Colpi
- Starring: Omar Sharif
- Music by: Gianni Ferrio
- Countries of origin: Spain; France; Italy; Cameroon
- Original language: Spanish

Production
- Producer: Jacques Bar
- Cinematography: Guy Delecluse; Enzo Serafin
- Editors: Paul Cayatte; Antonio Gimeno
- Running time: 96 minutes

Original release
- Release: 16 December – 27 December 1973

L'Île Mysterieuse / La Isla misteriosa y el capitán Nemo / Die Geheimnisvolle Insel (The Mysterious Island) is a 1973 Spanish-language Italian-Spanish-French-Cameroonian adventure film adapted from Jules Verne's 1875 novel L'Île mystérieuse. This version was directed by Juan Antonio Bardem and Henri Colpi and featured Omar Sharif as Captain Nemo. It was recut from a TV series of the same year.

== Plot ==
Shipwrecked soldiers are stranded on an island along with their dog, They discover many dangers on the island and retreat to the safety of a cave which they use as a home base. In addition, they save another shipwreck victim from a near-by island.

The group are successful in fending off a group off pirates. although the pirates do shoot the group's pet chimpanzee. The soldiers find a grotto containing Captain Nemo and the Nautilus. Nemo explains how he came to be at the island to the group

A volcano begins to destroy the island, and while the soldiers and their dog manage to escape, Nemo opts to go down with his ship.

== Production ==
The film was shot on Sunny Beach <Slanchev Brjag>, Bulgaria in 1972. Ref: 24 chasa, 168 chasa. The film was unusually faithful to the original book, including the exterior design of the Nautilus. Deviations from the original book were either limited to budget restrictions or moderate artistic liberty. While it seems not credible that the Nemo of the book achieved various physically demanding stunts (considering he was weakened and subsequently dying of old age), Omar Sharif is much younger, relies on what's left of his crew (killed by some kind of disease, most likely radiation poisoning) and eventually shares the same fate as his counterpart James Mason in the 1954 Disney version of 20,000 Leagues Under the Sea.

== Cast ==
- Omar Sharif: Captain Nemo
- Gérard Tichy: Cyrus Smith
- Philippe Nicaud: Gédéon Spilett
- Ambroise Bia: Nab (Nabuchodonosor dit)
- Jess Hahn: Bonaventure Pencroff
- Rafael Bardem Jr.: Harbert Brown
- Gabriele Tinti: Ayrton
- Mariano Vidal Molina: Bob Harvey
- Rik Battaglia: Finch

== Reception ==
Roger Ebert awarded the film one and a half stars finding it nihilistic and lacking any decent effects. It also noted Omar Sharif is listed as the star although he is only onscreen for ten minutes. Creature Feature gave the movie 2 out of 5 stars, finding it lacking imagination or interesting special effects.

== See also ==
- 20,000 Leagues Under the Sea (1954 film)
