= Death's Newlyweds =

- Spanish: Novios de la muerte
- Directed by: Rafael Gil
- Written by: Francisco Amorós; Rafael García Serrano; Rafael J. Salvia
- Produced by: Rafael Gil
- Cinematography: José F. Aguayo
- Edited by: José Luis Matesanz
- Music by: Gregorio García Segura; E. Guillén
- Production company: Coral Producciones Cinematográficas
- Distributed by: Consorcio Ibérico Cinematográfico
- Release date: 23 January 1975
- Running time: 106 minutes
- Country: Spain
- Language: Spanish

Death's Newlyweds (Spanish: Novios de la muerte) is a 1975 Spanish war film directed by Rafael Gil. The title refers to the famous song about and nickname for Spain's elite light infantry unit, the Spanish Foreign Legion.

== Cast ==
- Julián Mateos as Joaquín 'Chimo'
- Juan Luis Galiardo as Juan Ramón Soler
- Fernando Sancho as Commandant Lauria
- Ramiro Oliveros as Ricardo
- Helga Liné as Amelia
- José Nieto
- Mary Begoña as Chimo's mother
- Pedro Mari Sánchez
- Rafael Hernández as Sergeant Gómez
- Viky Lussón
- Gabriel Llopart
- Luis Induni
- Antonio Cintado
- Juan Ramón Torremocha
- Manuel Torremocha
- Leopoldo Francés
- Scott Miller
- Carlos Ballesteros as Sergeant Santaló
