= Luis Marquina (director) =

Spanish film director (1904–1980)

- Born: 25 May 1904; Barcelona, Spain
- Died: 26 June 1980 (aged 76); Madrid, Spain
- Years active: 1935–1972

Luis Marquina (25 May 1904 – 26 June 1980) was a Spanish film director and screenwriter.

== Selected filmography ==
- The Dancer and the Worker (1936)
- Whirlwind (1941)
- Malvaloca (1942)
- Fantastic Night (1943)
- Doña María the Brave (1948)
- Captain Poison (1951)
- Come Die My Love (1952)
- The Floor Burns (1952)
- Amaya (1952)
- Such is Madrid (1953)
- High Fashion (1954)
- Congress in Seville (1955)
- Where Are You Going, Alfonso XII? (1959)
- Alfonso XII and María Cristina (1960)
- The Viscount (1967)
- The King is the Best Mayor (1974)
