= Pepa Doncel =

1969 film

- Directed by: Luis Lucia
- Written by: Jacinto Benavente (play); Luis Lucia; Antonio Gala
- Produced by: Luis Sanz
- Starring: Aurora Bautista; Juan Luis Galiardo; Mercedes Vecino
- Cinematography: Antonio L. Ballesteros
- Edited by: José Antonio Rojo
- Music by: Antonio Morales Barretto
- Production company: Moviola Films
- Release date: 1969
- Running time: 101 minutes
- Country: Spain
- Language: Spanish

Pepa Doncel is a 1969 Spanish romantic drama film directed by Luis Lucia and starring Aurora Bautista, Juan Luis Galiardo and Mercedes Vecino, based in a play by Nobel Prize in Literature Jacinto Benavente.

== Cast ==
- Aurora Bautista as Elisa Medina Fernández 'Pepa Doncel'
- Juan Luis Galiardo as Gonzalo Carvajal Sastre
- Mercedes Vecino as La Tira
- Amalia de Isaura
- Maribel Martín as Genoveva 'Veva'
- Carlos Ballesteros
- Fernando Guillén
- Julio Goróstegui
- Ángel Menéndez
- Emilio Alonso
- Antonio Casas
- María Asquerino
- Gracita Morales as Trini 'La Amoníaco'

== Bibliography ==
- Mira, Alberto. The A to Z of Spanish Cinema. Rowman & Littlefield, 2010.
