= The Floor Burns =

- Directed by: Luis Marquina
- Written by: Juan Luis Calleja (novel); Luis Marquina
- Starring: Annabella; Tomás Blanco; Gérard Tichy
- Cinematography: José F. Aguayo
- Edited by: Magdalena Pulido
- Music by: Emilio Lehmberg
- Production company: Hesperia Films
- Distributed by: Mercurio Films
- Release date: 21 January 1952
- Running time: 90 minutes
- Country: Spain
- Language: Spanish

The Floor Burns (Spanish: Quema el suelo) is a 1952 Spanish drama film directed by Luis Marquina and starring Annabella, Tomás Blanco and Gérard Tichy. It was the French actress Annabella's final film.

== Cast ==
- Annabella as Mari Luz Hurtado
- Tomás Blanco as Rafael
- Rafael Calvo as Don Alberto Hurtado
- Gérard Tichy as Eduardo Behovia
- Maritina Zayas as Maribel Hurtado
- Raúl Cancio as Carlos Peñaranda
- Nicolás D. Perchicot as Fray Jerónimo
- Mario Berriatúa as Javier
- Margarita Alexandre as Alicia
- Santiago Rivero as Fiscal
- Miguel Pastor as Abogado
- Carlos Díaz de Mendoza as Federico Eslo
- Mary Lamar as Titina Olaya

== Bibliography ==
- De España, Rafael. Directory of Spanish and Portuguese film-makers and films. Greenwood Press, 1994.
- Jonathan Driskell. The French Screen Goddess: Film Stardom and the Modern Woman in 1930s France. I.B.Tauris, 2015.
