= Rafael Hernández (actor) =

Spanish actor (1928–1997)

- Born: 3 August 1928; Madrid, Spain
- Died: 7 November 1997 (aged 69); Madrid, Spain
- Occupation: Actor
- Years active: 1956–1990

Rafael Hernández (3 August 1928 – 7 November 1997) was a Spanish film actor. He appeared in some 200 films between 1956 and 1990. He was born and died in Madrid, Spain.

== Biography ==
Rafael Hernández was born in Madrid, the son of Isidro Hernández and Josefa Herrero. He was a municipal police motorcyclist when chance led him to appear in the film Manolo, guardia urbano, produced in 1956, starring Manolo Morán and Julia Caba Alba and directed by Rafael J. Salvia, who needed the cooperation of the police force for the shoot. And here came a young Rafael, then 28 years old, making a brief appearance practicing his profession in one of the scenes in the film.

The 1990s saw his retirement from cinema, to devote himself sporadically to television, appearing in prestigious series such as La forja de un rebelde, Truhanes, and Farmacia de guardia, giving his best, as in roles that squandered his comic talent in Lleno, por favor, Taller mecánico, and El sexólogo.His last television appearance was in the series Villarriba y Villabajo in 1994. His last film role was in the comedy Los gusanos no llevan bufanda (Worms Don't Wear Scarves) by Javier Elorrieta in 1991. He came full circle by playing the same role he started with, that of a municipal police motorcyclist, his actual profession.

== Selected filmography ==
- The Mustard Grain (1962)
- The Fair of the Dove (1963)
- Brandy (1964)
- El mejor tesoro (1966)
- Canadian Wilderness (1965)
- The Last Tomahawk (1965)
- Forty Degrees in the Shade (1967)
- Another's Wife (1967)
- A Decent Adultery (1969)
- Blood in the Bullring (1969)
- The Man Who Wanted to Kill Himself (1970)
- Una chica casi decente (1971)
- Murders in the Rue Morgue (1971)
- Nothing Less Than a Real Man (1972)
- The Cannibal Man (1972)
- The Dominici Affair (1973)
- The Marriage Revolution (1974)
- Dick Turpin (1974)
- Naked Therapy (1975)
- Death's Newlyweds (1975)
- The Legion Like Women (1976)
- May I Borrow Your Girl Tonight? (1978)
- Father Cami's Wedding (1979)
- Spoiled Children (1980)
- And in the Third Year, He Rose Again (1980)
- La colmena (1982)
- The Autonomines (1984)
