= Carlos Casaravilla =

Uruguayan actor

- Born: 12 October 1900; Montevideo, Uruguay
- Died: 17 February 1981 (aged 80); Cullera, Spain
- Occupation: Actor
- Years active: 1934-1978

Carlos Casaravilla (12 October 1900 – 17 February 1981) was an Uruguayan actor. He appeared in 85 films between 1934 and 1978. He starred in the film El Lazarillo de Tormes, which won the Golden Bear at the 10th Berlin International Film Festival.

== Selected filmography ==
- Viva la vida (1934)
- Un señor mucamo (1940)
- Mar abierto (1946) - Don Alberto
- Extraño amanecer (1948)
- The Party Goes On (1948) - Alexis
- Guest of Darkness (1948) - Coronel
- Las aguas bajan negras (1948) - Antón de Juan
- El verdugo (1948)
- La fiesta sigue (1948) - M. Chambom
- Cerca del cielo (1951) - Coronel Barba
- Comedians (1954) - Carlos Márquez
- Death of a Cyclist (1955) - Rafael Sandoval
- Congress in Seville (1955) - Dr. Sergio Radowsky
- Ha pasado un hombre (1956) - Kramer
- Andalusia Express (1956) - Carlos Salinas
- Un fantasma llamado amor (1957)
- The Pride and the Passion (1957) - Leonardo
- The Man Who Wagged His Tail (1957) - Hobo
- La puerta abierta (1957) - Police commissioner
- Heroes del Aire (1958) - Ibáñez
- La muralla (1958) - Alejandro Martínez
- Las locuras de Bárbara (1959)
- El redentor (1959)
- Charlestón (1959) - Don Ramón
- Molokai, la isla maldita (1959)
- Sonatas (1959) - Conde de Brandeso
- S.O.S., abuelita (1959)
- El Lazarillo de Tormes (1959) - Ciego (Blind Man)
- Buen viaje, Pablo (1959) - Velasco
- Ejército blanco (1959)
- The Crossroads (1959) - Comandante
- El amor que yo te di (1960) - Carreño
- Monsieur Robinson Crusoe (1960)
- Un ángel tuvo la culpa (1960) - Sergio Montañés
- Maria, Registered in Bilbao (1960) - Urrutia
- Mi calle (1960) - El astrónomo
- Peace Never Comes (1960) - Dóriga
- Conqueror of Maracaibo (1961) - Jean Brasseur
- Julia y el celacanto (1961) - Don Eulogio Rivera
- Sendas cruzadas (1961)
- Hola, muchacho (1961)
- Teresa de Jesús (1962) - Prior de los Calzados
- Milagro a los cobardes (1962)
- The Son of Captain Blood (1962) - Cpt. Murdock
- Detective con faldas (1962) - Ivan Sharovski
- Los desamparados (1962)
- Face of Terror (1962) - Dr. Reich
- The Legion's Last Patrol (1962) - Ben Bled
- You Have the Eyes of a Deadly Woman (1962)
- 55 Days at Peking (1963) - Japanese Minister (uncredited)
- Los conquistadores del Pacífico (1963)
- The Ceremony (1963) - Ramades
- Pacto de silencio (1964) - Cnel. Mercier
- Pyro... The Thing Without a Face (1964) - Frade
- Constance aux enfers (1964) - Detective
- Alféreces provisionales (1964) - Comandante médico
- La nueva Cenicienta (1964)
- Saul and David (1964) - Samuel
- El señor de La Salle (1964) - Maestro Soldado
- Crime on a Summer Morning (1965) - Le commissaire (uncredited)
- El puente de la ilusión (1965)
- Assassination in Rome (1965)
- The Hell of Manitoba (1965) - Judge
- Fall of the Mohicans (1965) - Tamenund
- Our Agent Tiger (1965) - Ricardo Sanchez
- Operation Double Cross (1965) - Varosky
- La Dama de Beirut (1965) - Comisario de la Interpol
- Platero y yo (1966) - Don Carlos
- Acompáñame (1966)
- Return of the Seven (1966) - First Peon
- Django Does Not Forgive (1966)
- Good Morning, Little Countess (1967)
- I'll Kill Him and Return Alone (1967) - Jackson Murphy
- The Mark of the Wolfman (1968) - Judge Aarno Weismann
- Un hombre solo (1969)
- Malenka (1969) - Dr. Horbinger
- Vivi ragazza vivi! (1971) - capitan Matteo
- The Horsemen (1971) - Messenger (uncredited)
- Rain for a Dusty Summer (1971) - Capt. Lerrera
- Pugni, pirati e karatè (1973) - Pirate (uncredited)
- El francotirador (1978) - Don Gonzalito
- El huerto del francés (1978)
- Pasión inconfesable (1978) - Daniel (final film role)
