= Rosario García Ortega =

Argentine actress

- Born: 17 March 1911; Buenos Aires, Argentina
- Died: 17 February 1994 (aged 82); Madrid, Spain
- Occupation: Actress
- Years active: 1950–1987 (film)

Rosario García Ortega (17 March 1911 – 17 February 1994) was an Argentine film and television actress.

== Selected filmography ==
- Agustina of Aragon (1950)
- The Song of Sister Maria (1952)
- From Madrid to Heaven (1952)
- Comedians (1954)
- High Fashion (1954)
- For Men Only (1960)
- Goya, a Story of Solitude (1971)
- The Regent's Wife (1975)
- The House of Bernarda Alba (1987)

== Bibliography ==
- Ronald Schwartz. Great Spanish Films Since 1950. Scarecrow Press, 2008.
