= Where Are You Going, Alfonso XII? =

- Spanish theatrical release poster
- Spanish: ¿Dónde vas, Alfonso XII?
- Directed by: Luis César Amadori
- Screenplay by: Luis Marquina; Manuel Tamayo; Luis César Amadori
- Based on: ¿Dónde vas, Alfonso XII? by Juan Ignacio Luca de Tena
- Produced by: José Carreras Planas
- Starring: Paquita Rico; Vicente Parra; Tomás Blanco; José Marco Davó; Lucía Prado; Mercedes Vecino
- Cinematography: José F. Aguayo
- Edited by: Antonio Ramírez de Loaysa
- Music by: Guillermo Cases
- Color process: Eastmancolor
- Production companies: PECSA Films; Carreras Planas
- Distributed by: Toleratus Films
- Release date: 29 January 1959
- Running time: 110 minutes
- Country: Spain
- Language: Spanish

Where Are You Going, Alfonso XII? (Spanish: ¿Dónde vas, Alfonso XII?) is a 1959 Spanish historical drama film directed by Luis César Amadori and starring Paquita Rico and Vicente Parra. It portrays the romance between Alfonso XII of Spain and his wife Maria de las Mercedes. Their marriage only lasted five months and three days before the 18-year-old queen died of typhoid fever.

The film was followed by a sequel Alfonso XII and María Cristina the following year.

== Cast ==
- Paquita Rico as Maria de las Mercedes
- Vicente Parra as Alfonso XII
- Tomás Blanco as the Duke of Sesto
- José Marco Davó as Antonio Cánovas del Castillo
- Lucía Prado as Infanta Isabel
- Mercedes Vecino as Isabel II
- Félix Dafauce as the Duke of Montpensier
- Ana María Custodio as the Duchess of Montpensier
- Jesús Tordesillas as Ceferino
- Mariano Azaña as Gobernador
- Aurora García Alonso as Clotilde
- Antonio Riquelme as Madrileño
- Rafael Bardem as Doctor Federico Rubio y Galí
- Isabel Pallarés
- María Luisa Ponte
- Luisa María Payán as María Cristina de Orleans
- Alfonso Rojas
- José Santamaría
- Aníbal Vela
- Nora Samsó
- Carmen Rodríguez
- Manuel Arbó
- Erasmo Pascual
- Xan das Bolas as Madrileño
- Ángel Álvarez as Tabernero

== Reception ==
The film was the leader at the Spanish box office in 1959.

== Bibliography ==
- Mira, Alberto. Historical Dictionary of Spanish Cinema. Scarecrow Press, 2010.
