= The Fair of the Dove =

- Directed by: José Luis Sáenz de Heredia
- Written by: Ricardo de la Vega (libretto); José Luis Sáenz de Heredia
- Produced by: Cesáreo González; Benito Perojo; Miguel Tudela
- Starring: Concha Velasco; Vicente Parra; Miguel Ligero
- Cinematography: Alejandro Ulloa
- Edited by: Antonio Ramírez de Loaysa
- Production companies: Producciones Benito Perojo; Suevia Films
- Distributed by: Suevia Films
- Release date: 9 December 1963
- Running time: 98 minutes
- Country: Spain
- Language: Spanish

The Fair of the Dove (Spanish: La verbena de la Paloma) is a 1963 Spanish musical comedy film directed by José Luis Sáenz de Heredia and starring Concha Velasco, Vicente Parra and Miguel Ligero. It is a remake of the film Paloma Fair.

The film's sets were designed by the art director Enrique Alarcón.

== Cast ==
- Concha Velasco as Susana / Mari Loli
- Vicente Parra as Julián
- Miguel Ligero as Don Hilarión
- Ángel Garasa as Tabernero
- Mercedes Vecino as Señá Rita
- Milagros Leal as Tía Antonia
- Irán Eory as Casta / Merche
- Félix Fernández as Don Sebastián
- Silvia Solar as Balbina
- Alfredo Landa as Manolo
- Mary Begoña as Encarna
- Antonio Ferrandis as Vendedor de 'la juerga padre'
- Modesto Blanch as Paco - el cochero
- Adrián Ortega as Guardia en mercado #1
- Miguel Ángel Ferriz as Don Lucio
- Luis Morris as Moro en mercado
- José Morales
- Agustín González as Frutero
- Tony Soler as Vendedora de lotería
- Erasmo Pascual as Vendedor de claras de limón
- Xan das Bolas as Francisco, el sereno
- Ricardo Ojeda
- Alberto Portillo
- Antonio Moreno
- Joaquín Pamplona
- Rafael Hernández as Hombre partida
- Pedro Oliver
- Enrique Navarro
- Roberto Cruz
- Valentín Tornos as Vecino anciano
- Antonio Zaragoza
- Enrique Núñez
- Manuel Rojas
- Pilar Gómez Ferrer as Señora en báscula
- José María Tasso as Chulo
- Joaquín Portillo 'Top'
- José Blanch as Amigo de Don Hilarión
- Goyo Lebrero as Guardia en verbena #1
- Daniel Dicenta
- María Elena Maroto
- Luis Varela
- José María Prada
- Jorge Cuadros
- Narciso Ojeda
- Simón Ramírez as Narrator
- Elena María Tejeiro

== Bibliography ==
- Mira, Alberto. Historical Dictionary of Spanish Cinema. Scarecrow Press, 2010. ISBN 978-0-8108-5957-9.
