= Gregorio García Segura =

Spanish film score composer

- Born: 13 February 1929; Cartagena (Murcia), Spain
- Died: 5 December 2003 (aged 74); Madrid, Spain
- Occupation: Composer
- Years active: 1956–1998 (film)

Gregorio García Segura (1929–2003) was a Spanish composer of film scores.

== Selected filmography ==
- The Showgirl (1960)
- Darling (1961)
- The Lovely Lola (1962)
- The Son of Captain Blood (1962)
- The Woman from Beirut (1965)
- The Drums of Tabu (1966)
- Seven Vengeful Women (1966)
- Great Friends (1967)
- The Rebellious Novice (1971)
- Variety (1971)
- The Girl from the Red Cabaret (1973)
- Forget the Drums (1975)
- Death's Newlyweds (1975)
- The Legion Like Women (1976)
- And in the Third Year, He Rose Again (1980)
- Spoiled Children (1980)
- All Is Possible in Granada (1982)
- Black Venus (1983)

== Bibliography ==
- Thomas Weisser. Spaghetti Westerns: the Good, the Bad and the Violent. McFarland, 2005.
