= Miguel Bardem =

Spanish film director and screenwriter

- Born: 1964 (age 61–62); Madrid, Spain
- Occupations: Film director, screenwriter
- Years active: 1995–present
- Father: Juan Antonio Bardem
- Relatives: Javier Bardem (cousin); Carlos Bardem (cousin); Mónica Bardem (cousin)

Miguel Bardem (born 1964) is a Spanish film director and screenwriter.

== Life ==
Bardem comes from a well-known family of actors. His father was director Juan Antonio Bardem, and his aunt is actress Pilar Bardem. Pilar's children, Javier, Mónica and Carlos are also active in the film industry.

Like his father, Bardem chose to work as a director, as well as being a screenwriter and actor. In his films, he often uses members of his family. For example, his aunt Pilar Bardem and his cousin Javier Bardem took on the leading roles in his directorial debut La madre. His debut work was awarded the Goya Award for Best Fiction Short Film. After this short film, he shot his first feature film with Alfonso Albacete in 1996. Más que amor, frenesí starred, among others, Nancho Novo, Cayetana Guillén Cuervo, and Ingrid Rubio. Carlos Bardem, the youngest cousin of Miguel, directed his acting debut under his direction. The style of the film is reminiscent of works by Pedro Almodóvar, according to a New York Times review. Más que amor, frenesí brought Bardem a Goya Award nomination for Best Newcomer Director. His next directing work, La mujer más fea del mundo, starring Elia Galera, Roberto Álvare, and Héctor Alterio. The film was awarded the Bucheon International Fantastic Film Festival prize.

In 2003, Bardem directed the Canal+-produced documentary Ninas de Hojalata. The film follows the lives of underage girls in Nepal who are sent by the thousands each year to India, where they are forced into prostitution.

In 2004, Bardem once again released a comedy film with Incautos. The film starred Ernesto Alterio, Victoria Abril and Federico Luppi. For the 50th anniversary of the comic heroes Clever & Smart, Bardem was commissioned for a live action film adaptation. The film was released in 2008 under the title Mortadelo y Filemón. Misión: Salvar la Tierra. The spy film starred Alex O'Dogherty, Secun de la Rosa and Edu Soto.

== Filmography ==
- 1995: La madre
- 1996: Not Love, Just Frenzy (Más que amor, frenesí)
- 1999: The Ugliest Woman in the World (La mujer más fea del mundo)
- 2001: Night Of Kings (Noche de reyes)
- 2003: Tin Girls (Niñas de Hojalata)
- 2004: Swindled (Incautos)
- 2008: Mort & Phil. Mission: Save Earth (Mortadelo y Filemón: Misión: salvar la Tierra)
- 2014: Prim, el asesinato de la calle del Turco
- TBA: Alina: La Hija Rebelde

== Awards ==
- 1996: Goya Award in the Best Fiction Short Film category for "La madre"
- 1997: Nominated for the Goya award as best young director for "Más que amor, frenesí"
- 2000: Nominated for the Goya award as best young director for "La mujer más fea del mundo"
- 2000: Awarded the Bucheon International Fantastic Film Festival Prize for "La mujer más fea del mundo"
