= Love and Other Solitudes =

- Directed by: Basilio Martín Patino
- Written by: Juan Miguel Lamet; Basilio Martín Patino
- Produced by: Juan Miguel Lamet
- Starring: Lucia Bosé; Carlos Estrada; María Massip
- Cinematography: Luis Cuadrado
- Edited by: José Luis Matesanz
- Music by: Carmelo A. Bernaola
- Production companies: Eco Films; Suevia Films
- Distributed by: Suevia Films
- Release date: 12 September 1969
- Running time: 96 minutes
- Country: Spain
- Language: Spanish

Love and Other Solitudes (Spanish: Del amor y otras soledades) is a 1969 Spanish drama film directed by Basilio Martín Patino and starring Lucia Bosé, Carlos Estrada and María Massip.

== Cast ==
- Lucia Bosé as María
- Carlos Estrada as Alejandro Lenador
- María Massip as Amalia
- Maria Aurèlia Capmany as Psicóloga
- Alfredo Mañas as Andrés
- Joaquim Jordà
- Carmelo A. Bernaola as Fernando
- Matilde Muñoz Sampedro as Madre de María
- Rafael Bardem as Padre de María
- Paloma Cela as Inmaculada
- Julia Peña
- Mario Pardo as Santi - estudiante de económicas
- Manolo Otero as Nacho
- Iván Tubau
- Carmen Martínez Sierra as Mujer de don Julio
- Juan José Otegui as Electricista
- Alfredo Santacruz as De la fábrica de electrodomésticos
- Marisol as herself

== Bibliography ==
- Bentley, Bernard. A Companion to Spanish Cinema. Boydell & Brewer 2008.
