= The Bicycle =

- Spanish: La bicicleta
- Directed by: Sigfrid Monleón
- Screenplay by: Martín Román
- Produced by: Emilio Oviedo; José María Morales; Francisco Lázaro
- Starring: Pilar Bardem; Sancho Gracia; Bárbara Lennie; Javier Pereira; Alberto Ferreiro; José Miguel Sánchez; Carlos Bardem; Rosana Pastor; Juan José Otegui; Albert Forner; Sergi Calleja; Cristina Plazas
- Cinematography: Alfonso Parra
- Edited by: Ángel Armada
- Music by: Joan Valent
- Production companies: Indigo Media; Wanda Vision; Fenix
- Distributed by: Nirvana Films
- Release dates: 22 March 2006 (Málaga); 30 June 2006 (Spain)
- Country: Spain
- Language: Spanish

The Bicycle (Spanish: La bicicleta) is a 2006 Spanish drama film directed by Sigfrid Monleón from a screenplay by Martín Román. It stars Pilar Bardem, Sancho Gracia, Bárbara Lennie, Javier Pereira, and Alberto Ferreiro.

== Plot ==
Set in Valencia, the plot follows three stories developing around a bicycle. Boy Ramón exchanges his bike at Mario's workshop, and the bike ends up in the hands of young student and courier Julia, who comes across old woman Aurora, and lends her the bike.

== Cast ==
- Pilar Bardem as Aurora
- Sancho Gracia as Mario
- Bárbara Lennie as Julia
- Javier Pereira as Santi
- Alberto Ferreiro as Luis
- José Miguel Sánchez as Ramón
- Carlos Bardem as Antonio
- Rosana Pastor as Victoria
- Juan José Otegui as Eugenio
- Albert Forner as Guzmán
- Sergi Calleja as activista
- Cristina Plazas as Angeles
- Carmen Belloch as Carmencin
- Cristóbal Suárez as Vicente

== Production ==
The screenplay was penned by Martín Román. The film was produced by Indigo Media, Wanda Vision and Fenix and it had the participation of Spanish and Valencian pubcasters TVE and RTVV. It was fully shot in Valencia.

== Release ==
The film was presented at the Málaga Film Festival in March 2006. Distributed by Nirvana Films, it was released theatrically in Spain on 30 June 2006.

== Reception ==
Jonathan Holland of Variety deemed the film to be "well-intentioned but wobbly".

== See also ==
- List of Spanish films of 2006
