= The Partisan of Villa =

1967 film by Miguel Morayta

- Directed by: Miguel Morayta
- Written by: Fernando Galiana; Miguel Morayta
- Produced by: Gonzalo Elvira Sánchez de Aparicio
- Starring: Carmen Sevilla; Julio Alemán; Vicente Parra
- Cinematography: Alex Phillips
- Edited by: Rafael Ceballos; Ignacio Chiu
- Music by: Manuel Esperón
- Production companies: Cesáreo González Producciones Cinematográficas; Oro Films
- Distributed by: Suevia Films
- Release date: 17 November 1967
- Running time: 97 minutes
- Countries: Mexico; Spain
- Language: Spanish

The Partisan of Villa (Spanish:La guerrillera de Villa) is a 1967 Spanish-Mexican comedy film directed by Miguel Morayta and starring Carmen Sevilla, Julio Alemán, and Vicente Parra. It is set in 1913 during the Mexican Revolution.

== Cast ==
- Carmen Sevilla as Reyes Mendoza
- Julio Alemán as Ricardo Peñalver
- Vicente Parra as Capitán Pablo Márquez
- José Elías Moreno as General Pancho Villa
- José Ángel Espinosa 'Ferrusquilla'
- José Baviera
- Enrique García Álvarez
- María Herrero as Doncella de Reyes
- Óscar Morelli as Capitán
- Salvador Zea
- Sergio Virel
- Charly Bravo
- Roberto Porter
- Guillermo Sánchez
- Jaime Fernández as Coronel Gutiérrez
- Carlos Cardán
- Mario García 'Harapos' as Villista
- Federico González as Hombre en teatro
- Leonor Gómez as Soldadera
- Isabel Vázquez 'La Chichimeca' as Pasajera tren

== Bibliography ==
- Sílvia Martinez & Héctor Fouce. Made in Spain: Studies in Popular Music. Routledge, 2013.
