= Una chica casi decente =

1971 film

- Directed by: Germán Lorente
- Written by: Ángel G. Gauna; Germán Lorente; Rafael J. Salvia
- Produced by: José Truchado
- Starring: Rocío Jurado; Adolfo Celi
- Cinematography: Raúl Artigot
- Edited by: José Luis Matesanz
- Release date: 1971
- Running time: 96 minutes
- Country: Spain
- Language: Spanish

Una chica casi decente is a 1971 Spanish comedy film directed by Germán Lorente and starring Rocío Jurado.

== Cast ==
- Rocío Jurado - Silvia
- Adolfo Celi - El Duque
- Máximo Valverde - Daniel
- Mirta Miller
- Manuel Gómez Bur
- Luis Sánchez Polack
- José Luis Coll
- Mary Paz Pondal (as Mari Paz Pondal)
- Rafael Hernández
- Valentín Tornos
- Juanito Navarro
- Tomás Blanco
- Manuel de Blas
- Frank Braña
