= The Rebellious Novice =

- Spanish: La novicia rebelde
- Directed by: Luis Lucia
- Screenplay by: Luis Lucia; Manuel Tamayo; José Luis Colina
- Based on: Sister San Sulpicio by Armando Palacio Valdés
- Produced by: Luis Sanz
- Starring: Rocío Dúrcal; Guillermo Murray; Isabel Garcés
- Cinematography: Antonio L. Ballesteros
- Edited by: José Antonio Rojo
- Music by: Gregorio García Segura
- Production company: Cámara Producciones Cinematográficas
- Release date: 1972
- Running time: 101 minutes
- Countries: Spain; Mexico
- Language: Spanish

The Rebellious Novice (Spanish: La novicia rebelde) is a 1972 Spanish-Mexican musical film directed by Luis Lucia and starring Rocío Dúrcal, Guillermo Murray and Isabel Garcés. It is a musical version of the 1889 novel Sister San Sulpicio by Armando Palacio Valdés. The plot follows the plight of Gloria, a dreamy (rather than rebellious) novice nun.

== Cast ==
- Rocío Dúrcal as Gloria
- Guillermo Murray as Dr. Sanjurjo
- Isabel Garcés as Hermana Estefanía
- Ángel Garasa as Don Sabino
- Máximo Valverde as José Luis
- Maruchi Fresno
- Eulália del Pino
- Rafael Guerrero
- Isabel Pradas
- Julio Riscal
- Antonio Pica
- Valentín Tornos as Paciente
- Pilar Bardem as Monja
- Juan Amigo
- Enrique Navarro
- Fernanda de Utrera
- Pepe Montoya
- José Sazatornil as Paciente
- Teresa Gimpera as Berta
- Elmer Modling as Martínez

== Bibliography ==
- Mira, Alberto. The A to Z of Spanish Cinema. Rowman & Littlefield, 2010.
