= Julia Martínez =

Spanish film and television actress

- Born: Julia Martínez Fernández; 5 December 1931 (age 94); Santander (Cantabria), Spain
- Other name: Julita Martínez
- Occupation: Actress
- Years active: 1952-

Julia Martínez Fernández (born 5 December 1931) is a Spanish film and television actress. She was awarded the Silver Shell for Best Actress at the San Sebastian International Film Festival in 1953.

== Selected filmography ==
- Spanish Serenade (1952)
- A Room for Three (1952)
- Flight 971 (1953)
- Nobody Will Know (1953)
- The Last Torch Song (1957)
- Miracle of the White Suit (1956)
- L'amore più bello (1958)

== Bibliography ==
- Bentley, Bernard. A Companion to Spanish Cinema. Boydell & Brewer 2008.
