= Ana María Custodio =

Spanish actress

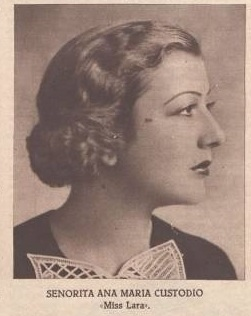
- Born: 19 March 1908; Seville, Spain
- Died: 10 April 1976 (aged 68); Madrid, Spain
- Other name: Ana María Muñoz Custodio
- Occupation: Actress
- Years active: 1931-1971

Ana María Custodio (1908–1976) was a Spanish film actress. She was the daughter of a military man and the sister of the writer Álvaro Custodio. Ana Maria Custodio irregularly continued her career after leaving to Mexico.

== Selected filmography ==
- There Were Thirteen (1931)
- The Dancer and the Worker (1936)
- Dawn of America (1951)
- Where Are You Going, Alfonso XII? (1959)
- My Street (1960)
- Three Ladies (1960)
- Alfonso XII and María Cristina (1960)
- The Daughters of Helena (1963)
- A Nearly Decent Girl (1963)
- Honeymoon, Italian Style (1966)
- Good Morning, Little Countess (1967)

== Bibliography ==
- Aubrey Solomon. The Fox Film Corporation, 1915-1935: A History and Filmography. McFarland, 2011.
