= Faustina (1957 film) =

1957 film

- Directed by: José Luis Sáenz de Heredia
- Written by: Johann Wolfgang Goethe; José Luis Sáenz de Heredia
- Produced by: Eduardo de la Fuente; José Luis Sáenz de Heredia
- Starring: María Félix; Fernando Fernán Gómez
- Cinematography: Alfredo Fraile
- Edited by: Julio Peña
- Release date: 13 May 1957
- Running time: 101 minutes
- Country: Spain
- Language: Spanish

Faustina is a 1957 Spanish comedy film directed by José Luis Sáenz de Heredia. It was entered into the 1957 Cannes Film Festival.

== Plot ==
A demon is required to make a pact with an old woman with a stormy past who wishes to return to youth. Mogón is a condemned man who committed suicide for that woman who was the cause of his losing his soul and being in hell.

== Cast ==
- María Félix as Faustina
- Fernando Fernán Gómez as Mogon
- Conrado San Martín as Capitán Batler
- Fernando Rey as Valentín
- Elisa Montés as Elena
- José Isbert as Cura
- Juan de Landa as Mefistófeles
- Tony Leblanc as Novio
- Tomás Blanco as Dueño del cabaret
- Xan das Bolas as Limpio
- Santiago Ontañón as Don Fernando
- Rafael Bardem as Jurado (as Rafael Barden)
