= Variety (1971 film) =

- Directed by: Juan Antonio Bardem
- Written by: Juan Antonio Bardem
- Produced by: Eduardo Manzanos Brochero
- Starring: Sara Montiel; Vicente Parra; Chris Avram
- Cinematography: Christian Matras
- Edited by: Antonio Gimeno
- Music by: Gregorio García Segura
- Release date: October 1971
- Running time: 99 minutes
- Country: Spain
- Language: Spanish

Variety (Spanish: Varietés) is a 1971 Spanish drama film directed by Juan Antonio Bardem and starring Sara Montiel, Vicente Parra and Chris Avram.

== Cast ==
- Sara Montiel as Ana Marqués
- Vicente Parra as Miguel Solís
- Chris Avram as Arturo Robles
- Trini Alonso as Carmen Soler
- José María Mompín as Manolo
- Antonio Ferrandis as D. Antonio
- Emilio Laguna as Jimmy Fernández
- Rafael Alonso as Ernesto Sánchez
- José Morales as Traspunte
- Miguel del Castillo as Representante
- Rafael Conesa as Maestro Juanito Blanco
- Pilar Bardem as Bella ayudante
- Ramón Centenero as Coreógrafo
- Santiago Ontañón as Decorador

== Bibliography ==
- Mira, Alberto. Historical Dictionary of Spanish Cinema. Scarecrow Press, 2010.
