= Carlos Bardem =

Spanish actor (born 1963)

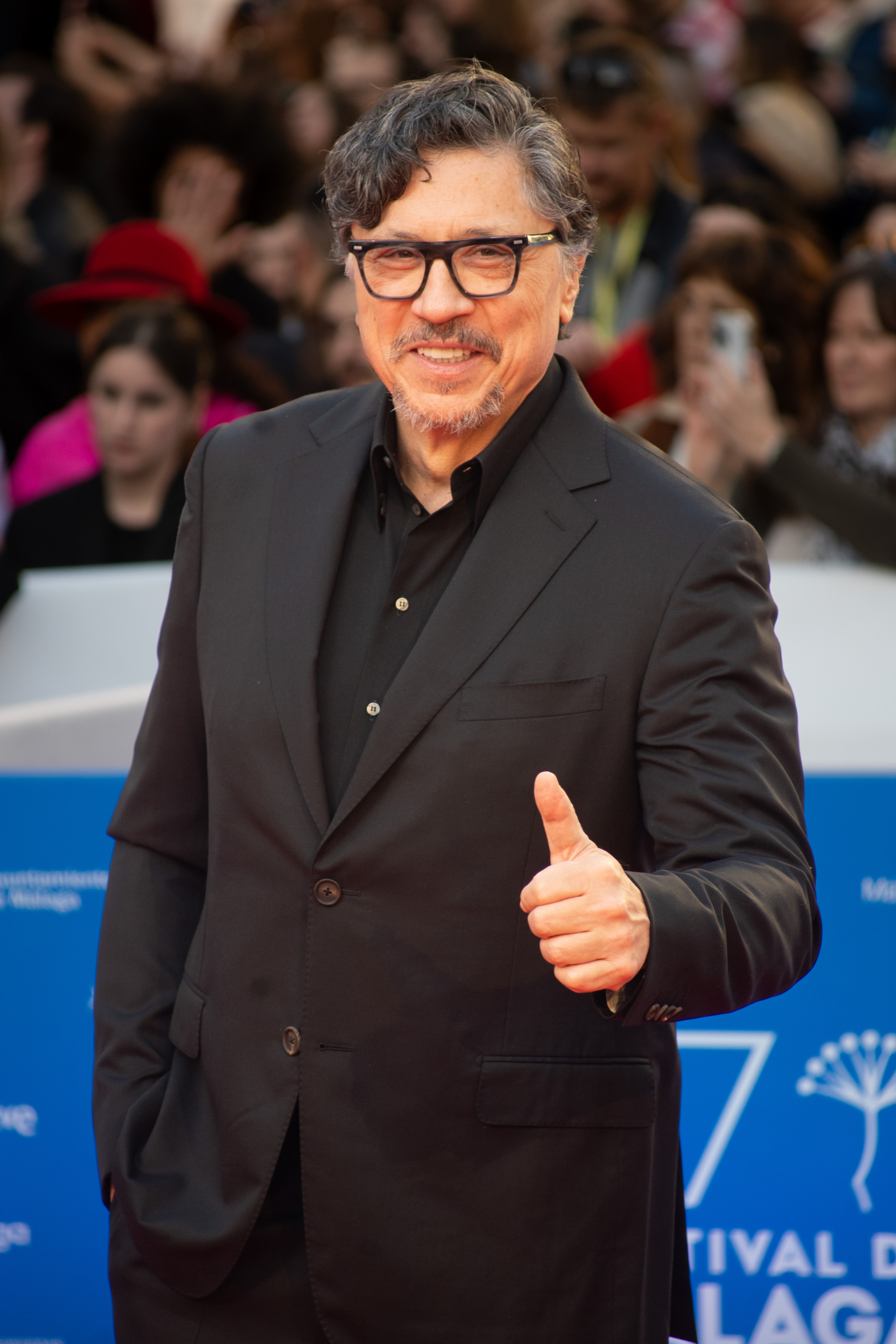
- Bardem in 2024
- Born: Carlos Encinas Bardem; 7 March 1963 (age 63); Madrid, Spain
- Education: Autonomous University of Madrid (Lic.)
- Occupations: Actor; novelist; screenwriter
- Years active: 1996–present
- Partner: Cecilia Gessa (since 2010)
- Mother: Pilar Bardem
- Relatives: Mónica Bardem (sister); Javier Bardem (brother); Juan Antonio Bardem (uncle); Rafael Bardem (grandfather); Matilde Muñoz Sampedro (grandmother); Miguel Bardem (cousin)

Carlos Encinas Bardem (born 7 March 1963) is a Spanish actor and writer. He is often cast in "tough guy" roles, if not outright villains. In addition to his native Spain, he has worked in film and television in Latin America and the United States. He has received three Goya Award nominations, both in acting and screenwriting categories, as well as seven Actors and Actresses Union Award nominations (and two wins).

Since making his film debut in Not Love, Just Frenzy in 1996, he has featured in pictures such as La zona (2007), Cell 211 (2009), Scorpion in Love (2013), and González: falsos profetas (2013). His television work includes credits in series such as La embajada, Club de cuervos, El señor de los cielos, El Cid, Queer You Are, 30 Coins, and The Chosen One.

He has also penned several novels, displaying a penchant for historical fiction.

== Life and career ==
Carlos Encinas Bardem was born in Madrid on 7 March 1963. He is the son of actress Pilar Bardem and the elder brother of actors Mónica and Javier Bardem. He earned a licentiate degree in history from the Autonomous University of Madrid and a diploma in foreign relations. He made his feature film debut in Not Love, Just Frenzy (1996), co-helmed by his cousin Miguel Bardem. A year later, he played a part in Álex de la Iglesia's film Perdita Durango, which starred his brother Javier.

In 1999, Bardem published his first novel, Muertes ejemplares, which was followed by Buziana o el peso del alma (2002).

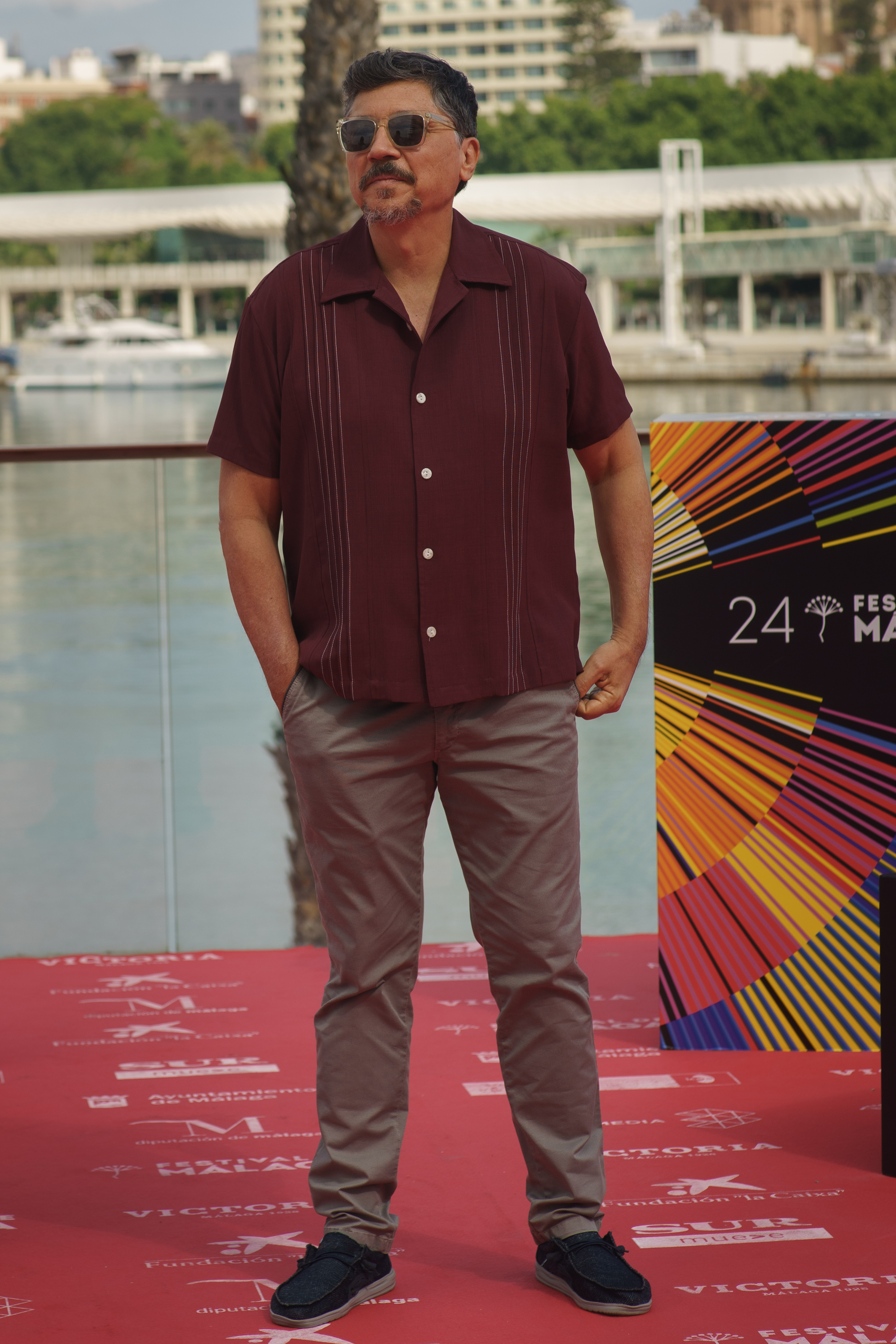
Bardem during the presentation of Queer You Are at the 2021 Málaga Film Festival

He won an Actors and Actresses Union Award for Best New Actor for his performance in the Spanish-Mexican co-production La zona (2007).

His portrayal of Apache in Cell 211 (2009) earned him a nomination for the Goya Award for Best Supporting Actor.

In 2010, he began a relationship with Cecilia Gessa.

Bardem adapted alongside Santiago Zannou his own novel about the genesis of violence Alacrán enamorado to screen. He also featured in the film, titled Scorpion in Love (2013), as a boxing coach, and won nominations to the Goya both for Best Adapted Screenplay and for Best Supporting Performance. He described his character as "a deeply human and therefore imperfect character, who lives in permanent defeat, but who finds reasons to get up". He portrayed evangelical pastor and charlatan Elías in the Mexican thriller González: falsos profetas (2013), receiving a nomination for the Ariel Award for Best Supporting Actor. In 2015, he appeared in Manolo Caro's comedy Elvira I Will Give You My Life But I'm Using It playing Gustavo, the husband of Cecilia Suárez's lead character Elvira. Continuing his work in Mexico, he played a football agent in comedy-drama series Club de Cuervos, which debuted on Netflix in 2015.

Bardem played the part of Benedicto, a mentor of the Order of Assassins, in the action film Assassin's Creed (2016).

In 2018, he starred in Colombian crime film Pickpockets in the role of Chucho, a mentor of young pickpockets.

In 2019, Bardem published his sixth novel, Mongo blanco (Plaza & Janés), which deals with 19th-century slave trader Pedro Blanco. Bardem reported that the novel's main theme "is evil, evil as a consequence of the evil exercise of power and extreme inequality".

Bardem played the villainous Count Flaín of León, an antagonist to Ruy Díaz de Vivar, in the Prime Video series El Cid, set in 11th-century Iberia.

He featured as the authoritarian father of Bob Pop in the former's autofictional series Queer You Are (2021), in a role in which Bardem's face is not displayed onscreen. Resuming collaboration with Álex de la Iglesia, he played a "narco-satanic" cardinal in the HBO series 30 Coins.

His 2023 novel Badaq (Plaza & Janés) is a moral fable and criticism of the Spanish empire dealing with the plight of an Indonesian female rhinoceros captured in the island of Pawu and taken to Madrid in the 16th century.

== Views ==
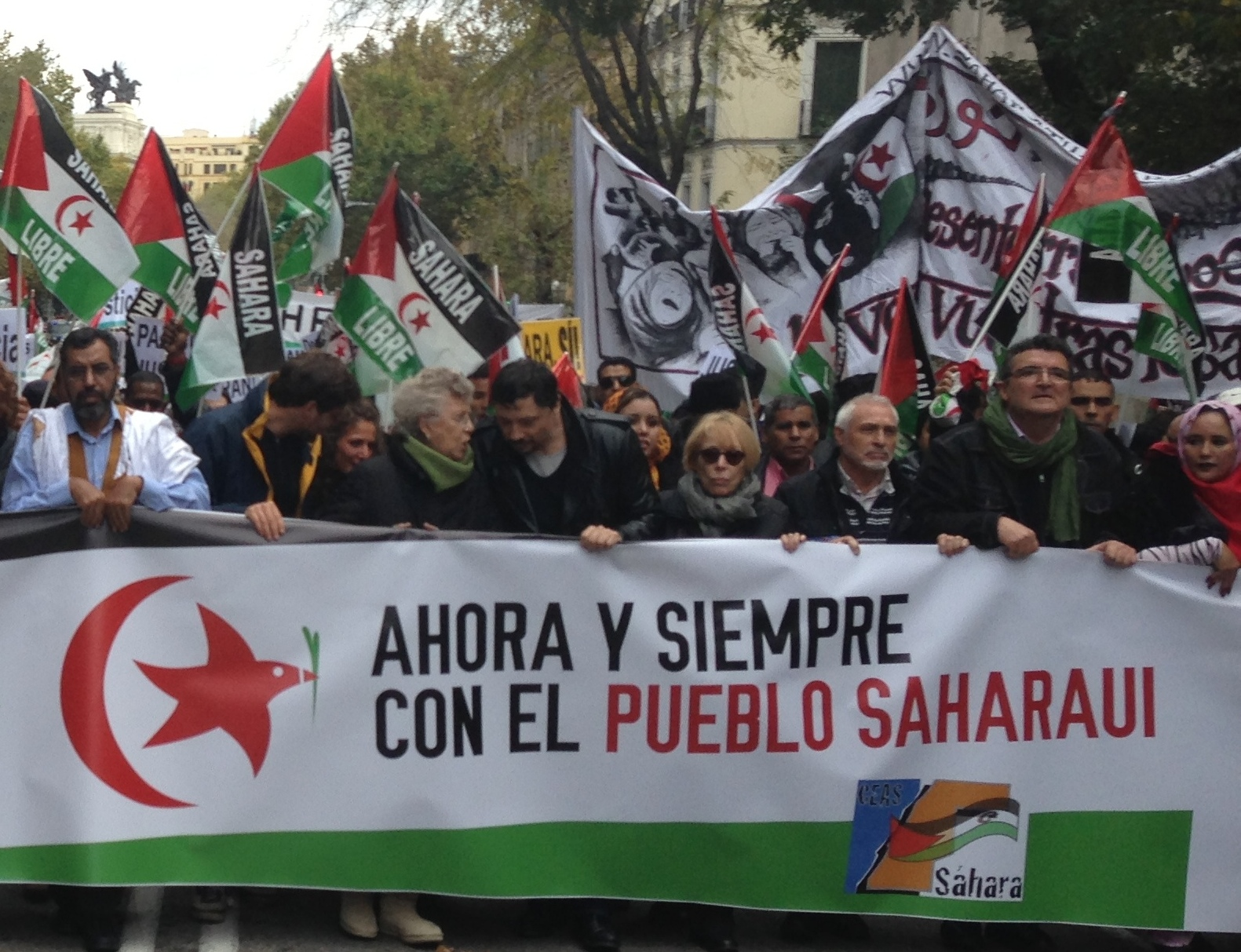
Bardem attending a 2012 demonstration in Madrid in solidarity with the Sahrawi people with his mother Pilar

Bardem is committed to left-wing positions. He has sided in favour of the right to self-determination of the Sahrawi people and has criticised the inaction of the Spanish political class in the matter since 1975. In the buildup to the 2011 Spanish general election, he lent public support to the electoral list of United Left.

In July 2025, Bardem signed a letter to the Government of Spain along with over 1,200 professionals demanding an immediate and comprehensive embargo of arms and defense material on Israel by means of a Royal Decree-Law, personally adding that "culture that does not denounce is collaborationist, culture must always be rebellious and critical”.

In 2026, he co-signed a manifesto in defence of Fergie Chambers, considering that the Spanish State "can and must prevent Chambers' extradition to the United States", demanding that "he be granted international protection through the recognition of his right to political asylum".

== Filmography ==
=== Film ===
Year	Title	Role	Notes	Ref.
1996	Más que amor, frenesí (Not Love, Just Frenzy)	Miguel		
1997	Perdita Durango (Dance with the Devil)	Reggie San Pedro		
1998	Torrente, el brazo tonto de la ley (Torrente, the Dumb Arm of the Law)	Cayetano		
1998	Resultado final	Obrero		
2000	Código natural			
2000	La gran vida	Matón discoteca 1		
2001	Juego de Luna (Luna's Game)	Reyes		
2002	Bestiario	Demetrio		
2004	Cien maneras de acabar con el amor	Carlos		
2004	El último negocio	Javier	Short film	
2005	Princesas (Princesses)	Portero discoteca		
2005	El desenlace	Rosendo		
2006	Por dinero negro	Rolf	Short film	
2006	La bicicleta (The Bicycle)	Antonio		
2006	Alatriste	Alguacil		
2006	Goya's Ghosts	French Colonel		
2007	La zona	Gerardo		
2007	La señal	Siracusa		
2008	Che: Part Two	Moisés Guevara		
2008	Solo quiero caminar	Ramón		
2009	El Niño Pez	Comisario Pulido		
2009	Celda 211 (Cell 211)	Apache		
2009	Malamuerte	Dorado		
2010	Entrelobos	Ceferino		
2011	Días de gracia	Victima X		
2011	Americano	Luis		
2011	10 pelis	Carlos		
2011	Transgression	Carlos		
2013	Alacrán enamorado (Scorpion in Love)	Carlomonte	Also screenwriter	
2013	Diamantes negros	Ramón		
2013	González: falsos profetas	Pastor Elías		
2013	Violet	Solomon		
2014	Anime nere	Miguel		
2014	Escobar: Paradise Lost	Drago		
2014	Elvira, te daría mi vida pero la estoy usando (Elvira I Will Give You My Life But I'm Using It)	Gustavo		
2015	Oliver's Deal	Rubén Caravedo		
2016	Renko	Adán Rutz		
2016	Assassin's Creed	Benedicto		
2018	Pickpockets: Maestros del robo (Pickpockets)	Chucho		
2018	Loca Olivia	Hombre Misterioso		
2018	Alegría, tristeza (Happy Sad)	Pedro López		
2019	A pesar de todo (Despite Everything)	Pablo		
2019	Adiós (Bye)	Santacana		
2022	Centauro	Boro		
2025	Tabula rasa			
2025	DRAGN	Daniel Diaz		
2025	Papeles (Papers)	Raúl Fassano		
2026	In the Grey	Manny Salazar		
TBA	Dragn †			
TBA	10-11 †			
2026	Tres Petalos	Alejandro Reina		

=== Television ===
Year	Title	Role	Notes	Ref.
1998	Hermanas	Karlos	Recurring role (season 2); 3 episodes	
1999	El comisario	Juanma Cañizares	Episode: "Muerto por error"	
2009–10	Hay alguien ahí	Justo	Recurring role (seasons 1–2); 17 episodes	
2015	Cuéntame	El Chino	Episode: "El último minuto de nuestra vida"	
2015–19	Club de Cuervos	Eliseo Canales		
2016	La embajada	Paco Cadenas	Recurring role (season 1); 11 episodes	
2017	The Son	Pedro García	Recurring role (season 1); 10 episodes	
2017	La zona	Krusty	Recurring role (season 1); 4 episodes	
2017–18	Traición	Julián Casas	Recurring role (season 1); 9 episodes	
2018	El Señor de los Cielos	Chivo Ahumada	Main role. Season 6)	
2020	El Cid	El conde Flaín	Main supporting role; 5 chapters	
2021	Maricón perdido (Queer You Are)	Padre		
2021	Madres. Amor y vida	Hector	Main cast. Introduced in season 3	
2023	The Chosen One	Father Cruz		
2023	30 monedas (30 Coins)	Cardenal de la Cruz		
2027	Chiquito el grande			

== Accolades ==
Year	Award	Category	Work	Result	Ref.
2008	17th Actors and Actresses Union Awards	Best New Actor	La zona	Won	
2010	24th Goya Awards	Best Supporting Actor	Cell 211	Nominated	
2010	19th Actors and Actresses Union Awards	Best Film Actor in a Secondary Role	Cell 211	Won	
2014	1st Feroz Awards	Best Supporting Actor in a Film	Scorpion in Love	Nominated	
2014	69th CEC Awards	Best Supporting Actor	Scorpion in Love	Won	
2014	28th Goya Awards	Best Adapted Screenplay	Scorpion in Love	Nominated	
2014	28th Goya Awards	Best Supporting Actor	Scorpion in Love	Nominated	
2014	23rd Actors and Actresses Union Awards	Best Film Actor in Secondary Role	Scorpion in Love	Nominated	
2015	57th Ariel Awards	Best Supporting Actor	González: falsos profetas	Nominated	
2017	26th Actors and Actresses Union Awards	Best Television Actor in a Minor Role	La embajada	Nominated	
2019	28th Actors and Actresses Union Awards	Best Film Actor in a Minor Role	Alegría tristeza	Nominated	
2024	32nd Actors and Actresses Union Awards	Best Actor in an International Production	The Chosen One	Nominated	
2026	34th Actors and Actresses Union Awards	Best Television Actor in a Secondary Role	La agencia	Nominated	
