= Mónica Bardem =

Spanish actress

- Born: Mónica María Encinas Bardem; 4 May 1964 (age 62); Madrid, Spain
- Occupation: Actress
- Years active: 1993–1998
- Spouse: Alfonso González Mazarrón (m. 2008)
- Children: 1
- Mother: Pilar Bardem
- Relatives: Carlos Bardem (brother); Javier Bardem (brother); Juan Antonio Bardem (uncle); Rafael Bardem (grandfather); Matilde Muñoz Sampedro (grandmother); Miguel Bardem (cousin)

Mónica María Encinas Bardem (born 4 May 1964) is a Spanish film actress, daughter of actress Pilar Bardem and sister of actors Carlos and Javier Bardem. Some of her films are Kika (1993), Más que amor, frenesí (1996) and Boca a boca (1995). She also manages the family restaurants La Bardemcilla and La Bardemcilla de Santa Ana in Madrid, but it was closed due to economic problems in 2013.

== Biography ==
Mónica Bardem comes from a famous family of Spanish actors: she is the daughter of actress Pilar Bardem and the niece of the late film director Juan Antonio Bardem. Her brothers are actors Javier Bardem and Carlos Bardem. Her cousin, Juan Antonio’s son, is director and screenwriter Miguel Bardem.
