= Rafael Bardem =

Spanish actor (1889–1972)

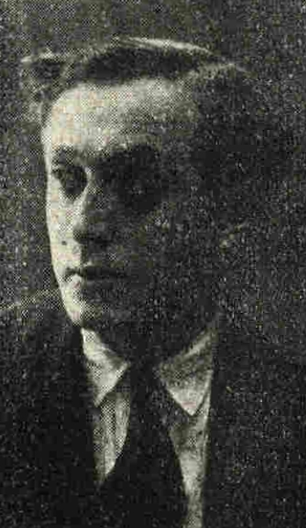
- Bardem in 1912
- Born: Rafael Bardem Solé; 10 January 1889; Barcelona, Catalonia, Spain
- Died: 6 November 1972 (aged 83); Madrid, Spain
- Occupation: Actor
- Years active: 1940–1969
- Spouse: Matilde Muñoz Sampedro (m. 1918; died 1969)
- Children: Juan Antonio Bardem; Pilar Bardem

Rafael Bardem Solé (10 January 1889 – 6 November 1972) was a Spanish film and stage actor whose career stretched from the 1940s through the 1960s. He was the husband of Matilde Muñoz Sampedro; the father of Juan Antonio Bardem and Pilar Bardem; and grandfather of Javier Bardem, Carlos Bardem, and Mónica Bardem.

Rafael Bardem died in Madrid in 1972.

== Filmography ==
Bardem has one television appearance; he played Diego's dad in the first episode of Diego de Acevedo.

=== Film ===
Year	Title (original)	Title (trans.)	Role	Ref.
1940	Mauricio o una víctima del vicio	Mauricio or a victim of the vice (lit.)		
1941	Tierra y cielo	Earth and Sky (lit.)	Don Sabino	
1944	El clavo	The Nail	Presidente de la audiencia	
1944	Empezó en boda	It Started at a Wedding (lit.)		
1945	El obstáculo	The Obstacle (lit.)	Padre Elías	
1946	Senda ignorada	Unknown Path	Defensor	
1947	Mariona Rebull	Mariona Rebull	Señor Llopis	
1947	Nada	Nada	Role censored and cut from film	
1947	Barrio	The Neighborhood (lit.)	Comisario	
1947	Luis Candelas, el ladrón de Madrid	Luis Candelas, the Thief of Madrid (lit.)		
1947	Canción de medianoche	Midnight Song (lit.)		
1947	Angustia	Anguish	Inspector	
1948	Revelación	Revelation (lit.)		
1948	El alarido	The Howl (lit.)		
1948	La vida encadenada	A Chained Life (lit.)		
1948	Brindis a Manolete	A Toast for Manolete	Hombre que da mala noticia (uncredited)	
1948	La fiesta sigue	The Party Goes On		
1949	Sabela de Cambados	Sabela from Cambados	Don Jaime	
1949	La mies es mucha	The Harvest is Plenty (lit.)	Reverendo Carty	
1949	Una mujer cualquiera	Just Any Woman	Diseñador de moda	
Pacto de silencio	Pact of Silence (lit.)	Insp. Costa		
1949	Siempre vuelven de madrugada	They Always Return at Dawn	Don Carlos	
1949	Vendaval	Gust of wind (lit.)		
1949	¡El santuario no se rinde!	The Sanctuary Does Not Give Up! (lit.)	Marqués de Orduña	
1949	Paz	Peace (lit.)		
1949	Noche de celos	Jealous Night (lit.)		
1949	Yo no soy la Mata-Hari	I'm Not Mata Hari	Gerente del hotel polaco	
1950	Sin uniforme	Without Uniform (lit.)	Anticuario	
1950	Don Juan	Don Juan	uncredited	
1950	Tiempos felices	Happy Times (lit.)		
1950	Black Jack	Black Jack		
1950	El último caballo	The Last Horse	Comisario	
1951	Servicio en la mar	Service at Sea	Don León	
1951	Cielo negro	Black Sky	Oftalmólogo	
1951	Una cubana en España	A Cuban in Spain	Don Agustín	
1951	La señora de Fátima	Our Lady of Fatima	Padre Manuel	
1951	El gran Galeoto	The Great Galeoto	Gabriel	
1952	Hace cien años	100 Years Ago (lit.)		
1952	El cerco del diablo	Devil's Roundup	Marido	
1952	Sor intrépida	The Song of Sister Maria	Director del banco	
1953	Les amants de Tolède	Lovers of Toledo	Don Jaime de Arévalo	
1953	Esa pareja feliz	That Happy Couple	Don Julián, el Comisario	
1954	Crimen en el entreacto	Crime in the Intermission (lit.)		
1954	El beso de Judas	Judas' Kiss	Posadero	
1954	¡¡Todo es posible en Granada!!	All Is Possible in Granada	Mr. Taylor	
1954	La ciudad de los sueños	City of Dreams (lit.)		
1954	Felices pascuas	Happy Easter (lit.)	Comisario	
1955	La hermana alegría	The Joy Sister (lit.)	Padre de Mariluz	
1955	El coyote	The Coyote	César de Echagüe sénior	
1955	El tren expreso	Express Train (lit.)	Dr. Núñez	
1955	El guardián del paraíso	Guardian of Paradise (lit.)	El Cicatriz	
1955	Historias de la radio	Radio Stories	Director de la emisora	
1955	Para siempre	Forever (lit.)		
1955	La pícara molinera	The Naughty Miller (lit.)	Excelencia	
1955	Sin la sonrisa de Dios	Without the Smile of God (lit.)	Director del colegio	
1956	Tarde de toros	Afternoon of the Bulls	Amigo 1º	
1956	La justicia del Coyote	The Coyote's Justice	Sr. de Echagüe	
1956	Mi tío Jacinto	Uncle Hyacynth	Agente artístico	
1956	La gran mentira	The Big Lie	Tío de Teresa	
1956	Miedo	Fear (lit.)		
1956	Pasión en el mar	Passion in the Sea	(lit.)	
1956	Los ladrones somos gente honrada	We Thieves Are Honourable	Don Felipe Arévalo	
1956	La mestiza	The Mestiza (lit.)		
1956	Manolo guardia urbano	Manolo, City Guard (lit.)	Presidente editorial	
1956	Un traje blanco	Miracle of the White Suit	Damián	
1957	Un abrigo a cuadros	A Checked Coat (lit.)	Comisario	
1957	Faustina	Faustina	Jurado	
1957	Cuando el valle se cubra de nieve	When the Valley is Covered with Snow (lit.)		
1957	Fulano y Mengano	Tom and Dick	Don Vicente	
1957	...Y eligió el infierno	...and chose hell (lit.)		
1957	Totò, Vittorio e la dottoressa	The Lady Doctor	Elia Vagoni	
1957	Sueños de historia	Dreams of History (lit.)		
1957	La cenicienta y Ernesto	Cinderella and Ernest	Damián	
1958	Un indiano en Moratilla	2 Mexicans in Aragón		
1958	Aquellos tiempos del cuplé	Those Times of Cuplé (lit.)	Líder parlamentario	
1958	La venganza	Vengeance	Médico	
1958	La vida por delante	Life Ahead (lit.)	Sr. Carvajal	
1958	La noche y el alba	Night and Dawn	Director	
1959	¿Dónde vas, Alfonso XII?	Where Are You Going, Alfonso XII?	Médico	
1959	Gayarre	Gayarre	Lampertti	
1959	La novia de Juan Lucero	Juan Lucero's Girlfriend (lit.)	Médico	
1959	Carta al cielo	Letter to Heaven (lit.)		
1959	Camarote de lujo	Luxury Cabin	Don Jacinto	
1959	Salto a la gloria	Leap to Fame	Profesor Casas	
1959	Sonatas	Sonatas	Juan Manuel Montenegro	
1959	Diego Corrientes	Diego Corrientes	Corregidor	
1959	Con la vida hicieron fuego	They Fired with Their Lives	Viqueira	
1959	La casa de la Troya	College Boarding House	Don Laureano	
1959	Tenemos 18 años	We Are 18 Years Old	uncredited	
1959	Duelo en la cañada	Duel in the Glen (lit.)	Comisario - scenes cut	
1960	El Litri y su sombra	Litri and His Shadow	Don Alberto	
1960	El hombre que perdió el tren	The Man That Missed the Train (lit.)	Luis	
1960	Alfonso XII y María Cristina: ¿Dónde vas triste de ti?	Alfonso XII and María Cristina	Ceferino - ayuda de cámara	
1960	La rana verde	The Green Frog (lit.)	Don Félix	
1960	Mi último tango	My Last Tango	Maestro Andreu	
1960	Mi calle	My Street	Señor Palomino	
1961	El indulto	The Reprieve	Cura en estación	
1961	Siega verde	Green Harvest		
1961	Fantasmas en la casa	Ghosts in the House (lit.)	El Húngaro	
1961	Prohibido enamorarse	Forbidden to Fall in Love (lit.)	Dr. Aguirre	
1961	Cariño mío	Darling	Miguel's Father	
1961	La rosa roja	The Red Rose		
1961	La IV carabela	The Little Caravel (lit.)	Embajador	
1962	Teresa de Jesús	Teresa of Jesus (lit.)		
1962	Historia de una noche	Story of a Night (lit.)	Don Marcos	
1962	El hijo del capitán Blood	The Son of Captain Blood	Priest	
1963	La alternativa	The Alternative (lit.)		
1963	Pacto de silencio	Pact of Silence (lit.)		
1963	Nunca pasa nada	Nothing Ever Happens	Don Marcelino	
1964	Cuatro balazos	Four Bullets for Joe	Juez	
1965	Misión Lisboa	Espionage in Lisbon		
1965	Agente X 1-7 operazione Oceano	Agente X 1-7 operazione Oceano	Professor Calvert	
1966	7 pistole per i MacGregor	Seven Guns for the MacGregors	Judge Garland	
1966	La mujer perdida	The Lost Woman		
1967	Buenos días, condesita	Good Morning, Little Countess	Félix	
1969	Del amor y otras soledades	Love and Other Solitudes	Padre de María	
