= Mercedes Vecino =

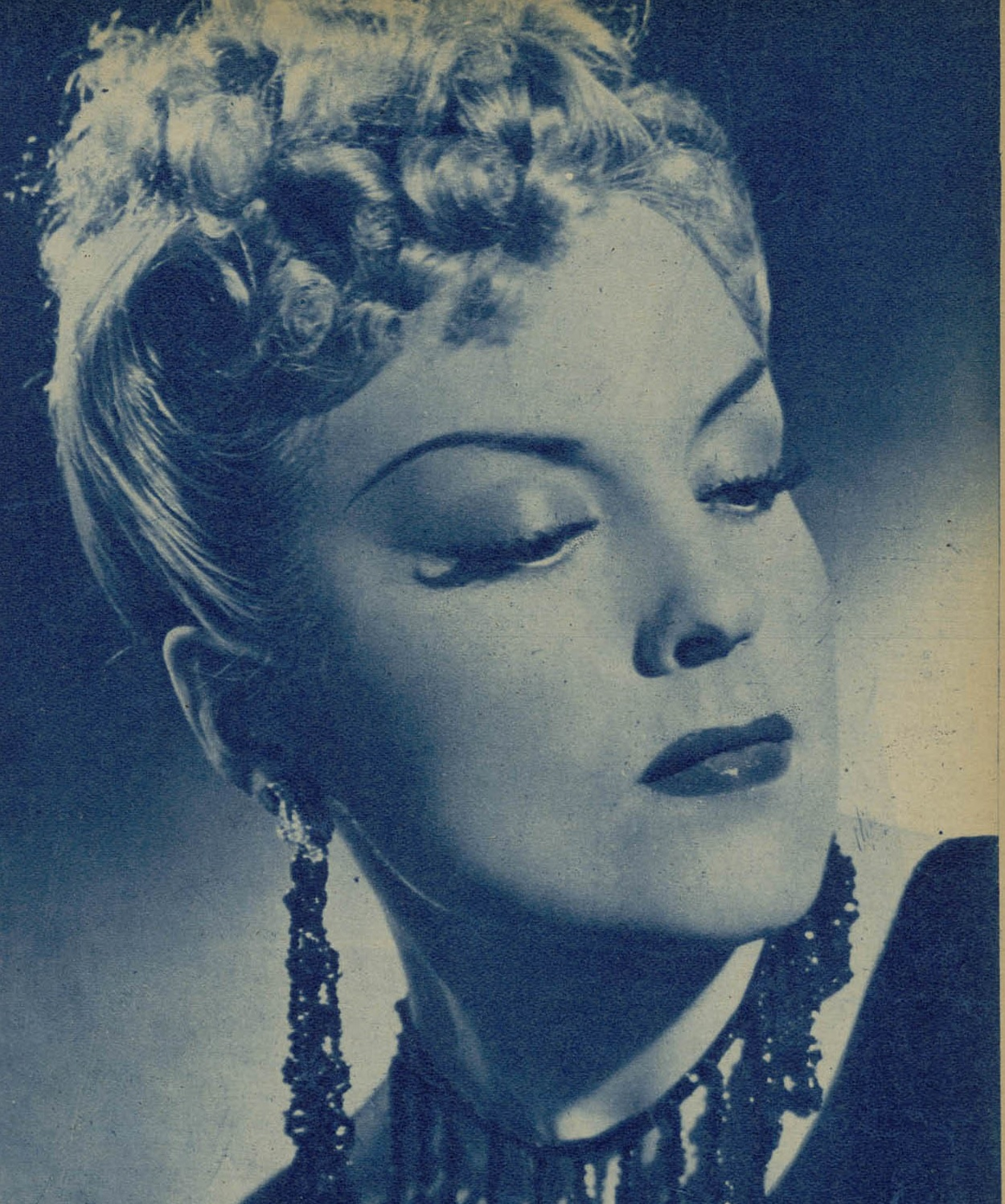
- Mercedes Vecino
- Born: Mercedes Vecino Francés; 4 February 1916; Melilla, Spain
- Died: 28 August 2004 (aged 88); Alicante, Spain
- Occupation: Actress
- Years active: 1941-1997
- Spouses: José Jaspe; José Vaquero
- Children: Mar Vaquero (daughter)

Mercedes Vecino Francés (4 February 1916 – 28 August 2004) was a Spanish film actress. She was famous as the woman who gave "the first kiss" in Spanish cinema.

== Biography ==
Vecino was born in Melilla, Spain, located next to Morocco in North Africa, and died in Alicante, Spain. She was the daughter of a military man, married first to actor José Jaspe, and then to José Vaquero, (also known as Pepe), artistic representative of well-known folklorics such as Lola Flores or Carmen Sevilla. She had a daughter Mar Vaquero. She developed her professional career in Barcelona and then in Alicante, where she found the weather suited her health better.

Known as a remarkably beautiful woman, in the early 1930s, Vecino was named Miss Barcelona, and shortly thereafter she began performing as a showgirl in various productions.

She began her big screen career in 1941 in a small role in Francisco Gargallo's El sobre lacrado.

When she kissed Armando Calvo in The Poor Rich Man (1942) she revolutionized the Spanish film industry. Until that time, the Spanish government had censored on-screen kisses, hiding them behind a black "fondu" so that the audience could imagine the kiss, but wouldn't see it.

In 1944, Vecino left film work to focus on her theater career. She returned to the big screen with the 1959 production Where Are You Going, Alfonso XII?

In the 1960s, Vecino acted in supporting roles in films by Pedro Lazaga such as La verbena de la Paloma, Currito de la Cruz, Es mi hombre, and What do we do with the children? She also appeared in Pepa Doncel, by Luis Lucia.

Vecino died in Alicante in 2004 at the age of 88.

== Selected filmography ==
- We Thieves Are Honourable (1942)
- El abanderado (1943)
- The Scandal (1943)
- Lessons in Good Love (1944)
- Where Are You Going, Alfonso XII? (1959)
- Darling (1961)
- The Fair of the Dove (1963)
- Currito of the Cross (1965)
- He's My Man! (1966)
- Pepa Doncel (1969)

== Bibliography ==
- Goble, Alan. The Complete Index to Literary Sources in Film. Walter de Gruyter, 1 Jan 1999.
