= The Cannibal Man =

- Blue Underground DVD cover
- The Cannibal Man
- Directed by: Eloy de la Iglesia
- Written by: Eloy de la Iglesia; Antonio Fos
- Produced by: José Truchado
- Starring: Vicente Parra; Emma Cohen; Eusebio Poncela
- Cinematography: Raúl Artigot
- Music by: Fernando García Morcillo
- Distributed by: Anchor Bay Entertainment (USA; DVD, 2003); Blue Underground (USA; DVD, 2007)
- Release date: 1972
- Running time: 98 min.
- Country: Spain
- Language: Spanish

The Cannibal Man (Spanish La Semana del asesino, literally "Week of the Killer") is a 1972 horror film, directed by Eloy de la Iglesia and written by de la Iglesia and Antonio Fos. Despite the international title, the film contains no scenes of cannibalism. The film is also known as The Apartment On The 13th Floor.

The film was featured on the British Director of Public Prosecutions' list of "Video Nasties".

== Plot ==
After accidentally killing a taxicab driver, Marcos (Vicente Parra), a young man who works as a butcher, wants to cover up his crime. Marcos's girlfriend Paula (Emma Cohen), the only witness, wishes to go to the police, so he strangles her. Marcos finds himself killing others, including members of his family, as they become suspicious of his actions, butchering his victims' remains at his workplace to dispose of the bodies.

== Background ==
TV Guide opined that "this bloody, politically inflected drama is not at all what the exploitative English-language title suggests. [...] Though the US title suggests a zombie gut-cruncher and the marketing campaign was designed to make Eloy de la Iglesia's film look like a Last House on the Left (1972) knock-off, The Cannibal Man is both a study of an apparently ordinary person spiraling into madness and a slyly satirical evocation of life in Spain under the oppressive Franco regime."

== Cast ==
- Vicente Parra as Marcos
- Emma Cohen as Paula
- Eusebio Poncela as Néstor
- Vicky Lagos as Rosa
- Lola Herrera as Carmen
- Charly Bravo as Esteban
- Fernando Sánchez Polack as Señor Ambrosio
- Goyo Lebrero as the taxi driver
- Ismael Merlo as chief of staff
- Rafael Hernández as Agustín
- José Franco as shopkeeper
- Valentín Tornos as worker
- Antonio Orengo as lorry driver
- Antonio Corencia as mocking worker
- Antonio del Real as mocking worker

== Critical reception ==
PopMatters called the film "a refreshing forgotten gem". DVD Verdict called it "an extremely well-made Euro thriller with welcome social commentary and subtext. Suspenseful, disturbing and graphically violent, the film succeeds in its depictions of both physical and psychological horror."
