= Juicio de faldas =

- Directed by: José Luis Sáenz de Heredia
- Produced by: Alfredo Fraile P.C. / Arturo González Producciones
- Music by: Gregorio García Segura
- Release date: 1969
- Running time: 96 minutes
- Country: Spain
- Language: Spanish

Juicio de faldas is a 1969 Spanish motion picture. The film was directed by José Luis Sáenz de Heredia, and stars Manolo Escobar, Concha Velasco, José Sazatornil, and Gracita Morales.

== Plot ==
Manolo is a trucker accused of having raped and left pregnant a young woman from a neighboring town. A beautiful lawyer, Marta, is wary at first, but soon shows her great professional skills is responsible for Manolo's defense.

Marta begins to investigate witnesses and others from the village, interviews the accuser and her lawyer, and finally is convinced that their sponsored is innocent, as he has from the very beginning.

The problem is that all the circumstantial evidence point to Manolo, and he has no choice but to find the real culprit. Otherwise he have only two options: prison or the wed the defendant, which they are opposed to categorically.

After a trial filled with curiosities (Manolo declares singing, the private accuser and his wife are called to testify, the defense lawyer kisses a witness...), the truly guilty party is discovered, and Manolo can enjoy his freedom with his beloved lawyer.

== Cast ==
- Manolo Escobar
- Concha Velasco
- Antonio Ozores
- José Sazatornil
- Gracita Morales
