= Juan Antonio Bardem =

Spanish film director and screenwriter (1922–2002)

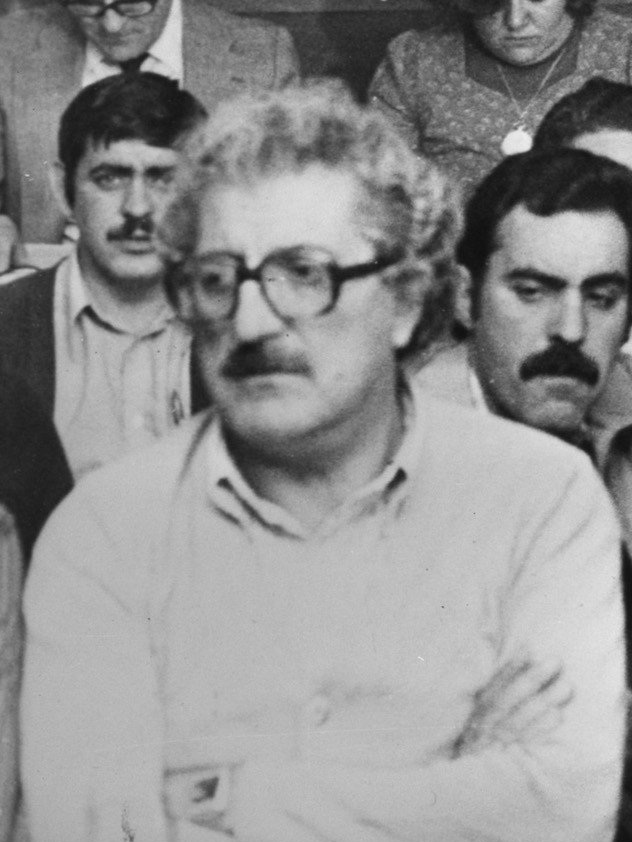
- Bardem in 1977
- Born: Juan Antonio Bardem Muñoz; 2 June 1922; Madrid, Spain
- Died: 30 October 2002 (aged 80); Madrid, Spain
- Occupations: Film director, screenwriter
- Years active: 1951–1997
- Spouse: María Aguado Barbado
- Children: 4, including Miguel
- Parents: Rafael Bardem; Matilde Muñoz Sampedro
- Relatives: Pilar Bardem (sister); Javier Bardem (nephew); Carlos Bardem (nephew); Mónica Bardem (niece)

Juan Antonio Bardem Muñoz (2 June 1922 – 30 October 2002) was a Spanish film director and screenwriter, born in Madrid. Bardem was best known for Muerte de un ciclista (1955) which won the FIPRESCI Prize at the 1955 Cannes Film Festival, and El puente (1977) which won the Golden Prize at the 10th Moscow International Film Festival. His 1979 film Seven Days in January won the Golden Prize at the 11th Moscow International Film Festival.

In 1953, he and Luis García Berlanga founded a film magazine, Objetivo, which existed until 1956. He was a member of the Communist Party.

During the Franco dictatorship, Bardem was imprisoned due to the anti-fascist nature of his films.

In 1981, he was a member of the jury at the 12th Moscow International Film Festival. In 1993, he was a member of the jury at the 43rd Berlin International Film Festival. Bardem was the father of director Miguel Bardem and uncle of actor Javier Bardem. Bardem died in Madrid in 2002, at age 80.

== Filmography ==
=== Film ===
| Year | Title | Director | Writer | Notes |
|---|---|---|---|---|
| 1948 | Paseo por una antigua guerra | Yes | Yes | Documentary short film Co-directed with Luis García Berlanga & Augustín Navarro |
| 1951 | Esa pareja feliz | Yes | Yes | Co-directed with Luis García Berlanga |
| 1953 | Welcome Mr. Marshall! | No | Yes | |
| 1954 | Novio a la vista | No | Yes | |
| 1954 | Cómicos | Yes | Yes | |
| 1954 | Chateaux en Espagne | No | Yes | |
| 1954 | Felices pascuas | Yes | Yes | |
| 1955 | Death of a Cyclist | Yes | Yes | |
| 1956 | Playa Prohibida | No | Yes | |
| 1956 | Don Juan | No | Yes | |
| 1956 | Calle Mayor | Yes | Yes | |
| 1956 | Tormento D'Amore | No | Yes | |
| 1957 | Vengeance | Yes | Yes | |
| 1959 | Sonatas | Yes | Yes | |
| 1960 | At Five O'Clock in the Afternoon | Yes | Yes | |
| 1963 | Los inocentes | Yes | Yes | |
| 1963 | Nunca pasa nada | Yes | Yes | |
| 1965 | Los pianos mecánicos | Yes | Yes | |
| 1970 | El último día de la guerra | Yes | Yes | |
| 1971 | Variety | Yes | Yes | |
| 1973 | La corrupción de Chris Miller | Yes | Yes | |
| 1973 | La isla misteriosa y el capitán Nemo | Yes | Yes | Co-directed with Henri Colpi |
| 1973 | La Campana del Infierno | Uncredited | No | Replaced Claudio Guerín as the director die on set from an accidental fall. |
| 1975 | El poder del deseo | Yes | Yes | |
| 1977 | El puente | Yes | Yes | |
| 1979 | Siete días de enero | Yes | Yes | |
| 1982 | Die Mahnung | Yes | Yes | |
| 1985 | España, una fiesta | Yes | No | Documentary short film |
| 1997 | Resultado final | Yes | Yes | Final film |

=== Television ===
| Year | Title | Director | Writer | Notes |
|---|---|---|---|---|
| 1972 | Les Évasions Célèbres | Yes | No | TV Series |
| 1973 | La isla misteriosa y el capitán Nemo | Yes | Yes | TV Miniseries; 6 episodes Extended version of his movie from the same name co-directed with Henri Colpi |
| 1985 | La Huella del Crimen | Yes | Yes | TV Series; Episode: "Jarabo" |
| 1987-1988 | Lorca, muerte de un poeta | Yes | Yes | TV Miniseries; 6 episodes |
| 1993 | El joven Picasso | Yes | Yes | TV Miniseries; 4 episodes |

==== Acting roles ====
| Year | Title | Role | Notes |
|---|---|---|---|
| 1951 | Esa pareja feliz | Técnico de sonido | Uncredited cameo |
| 1954 | Cómicos | Atrecista | Uncredited cameo |
| 1954 | Felices pascuas | Recadero del Bar | Uncredited cameo |
| 1973 | La corrupción de Chris Miller | Pedro | Credited as Juan Bardem |
| 1977 | A Dog Called....Vengeance | Abraham Abatti | |
| 1978 | El Diputado | Juan | |
| 1986 | Adios pequeña | | Uncredited role |
| 1996 | Noctámbulos | Mendigo viejo | Short film |
