= Pilar Bardem =

Spanish actress (1939–2021)

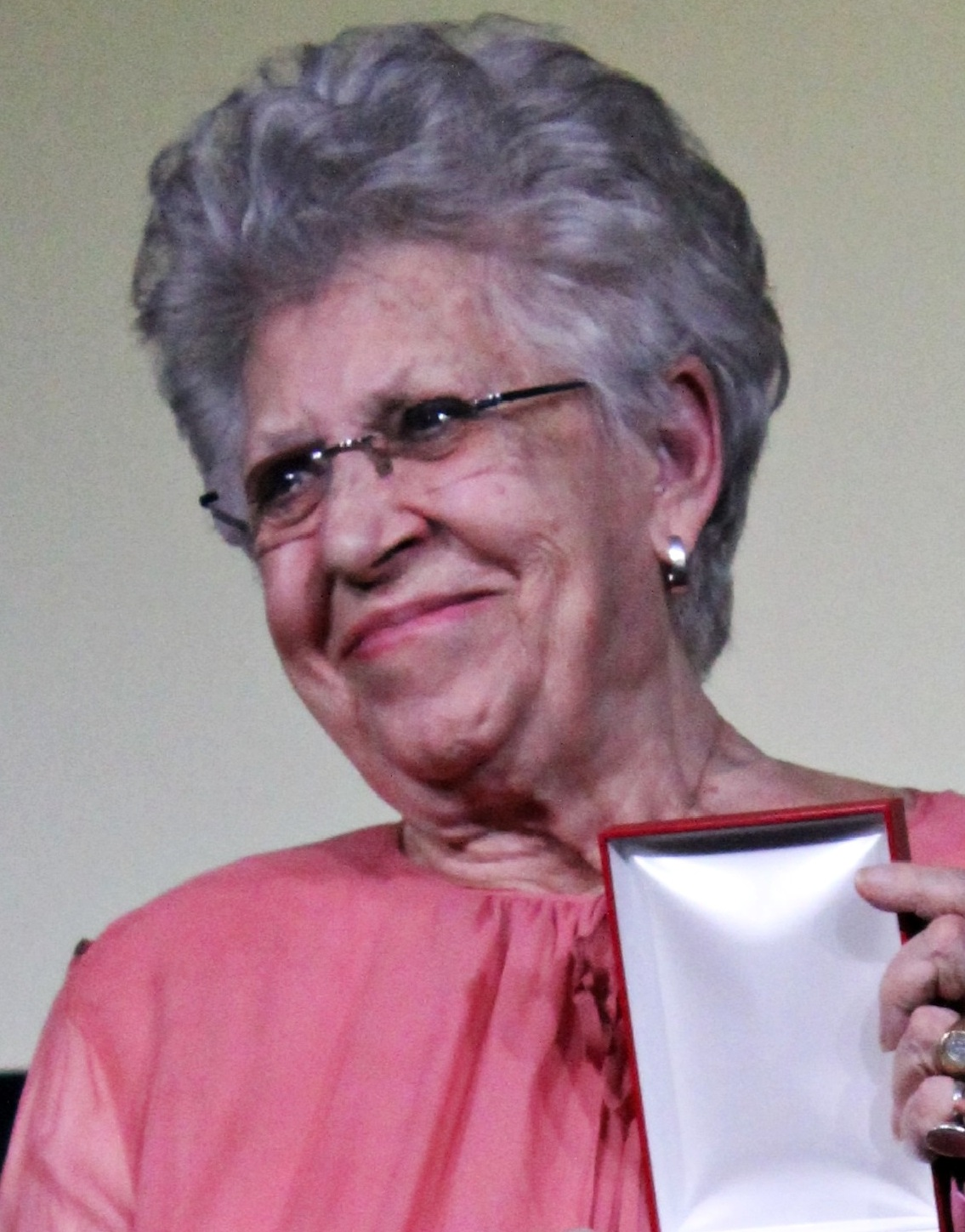
- Bardem in 2018
- Born: María del Pilar Bardem Muñoz; 14 March 1939; Seville, Spain
- Died: 17 July 2021 (aged 82); Madrid, Spain
- Occupation: Actress
- Spouse: José Carlos Encinas Doussinague (m. 1961; sep. 1973)
- Children: Carlos, Mónica, Javier
- Parents: Rafael Bardem; Matilde Muñoz Sampedro
- Relatives: Juan Antonio Bardem (brother)

María del Pilar Bardem Muñoz (14 March 1939 – 17 July 2021) was a Spanish film and television actress. In 1996, she won the Goya Award for Best Supporting Actress for her role in Nobody Will Speak of Us When We're Dead.

She was the mother of Carlos, Mónica, and Javier Bardem.

== Early life and career ==
Pilar Bardem was born to Barcelonian actor Rafael Bardem and Madrilenian actress Matilde Muñoz Sampedro in Seville on 14 March 1939, while her parents were working with the theatre company of Carmen Díaz. She had an elder sister named the same as her who died at age 8 two years before her birth. Her elder brother Juan Antonio Bardem was a film director. Three months old, she relocated with her family to Barcelona, and then to Madrid, where she spent her childhood. She travelled in a theatre tour for the first time at age 13, accompanying her parents. She made her debut onstage at age 18, in a play of Mourning Becomes Electra. Influenced by a Jesuit priest working in her school, she started medicine studies but dropped out in her third year, and started working as model for the likes of Loewe and Balenciaga. She made her big screen debut as an actress in Life Goes On (1965).

She was a regular in the television series Compuesta y sin novio (1994), Hermanas (1998), El Inquilino (2004), and Amar en tiempos revueltos (2005–2007).

Bardem was the recipient of the Goya Award for Best Supporting Actress, the Premios ACE for Best Supporting Actress, the Valladolid International Film Festival Award for Best Actress, and two Spanish Actors Union Awards for her performances.

In 2015, she made her last film appearance in Gipsy King.

== Activism ==
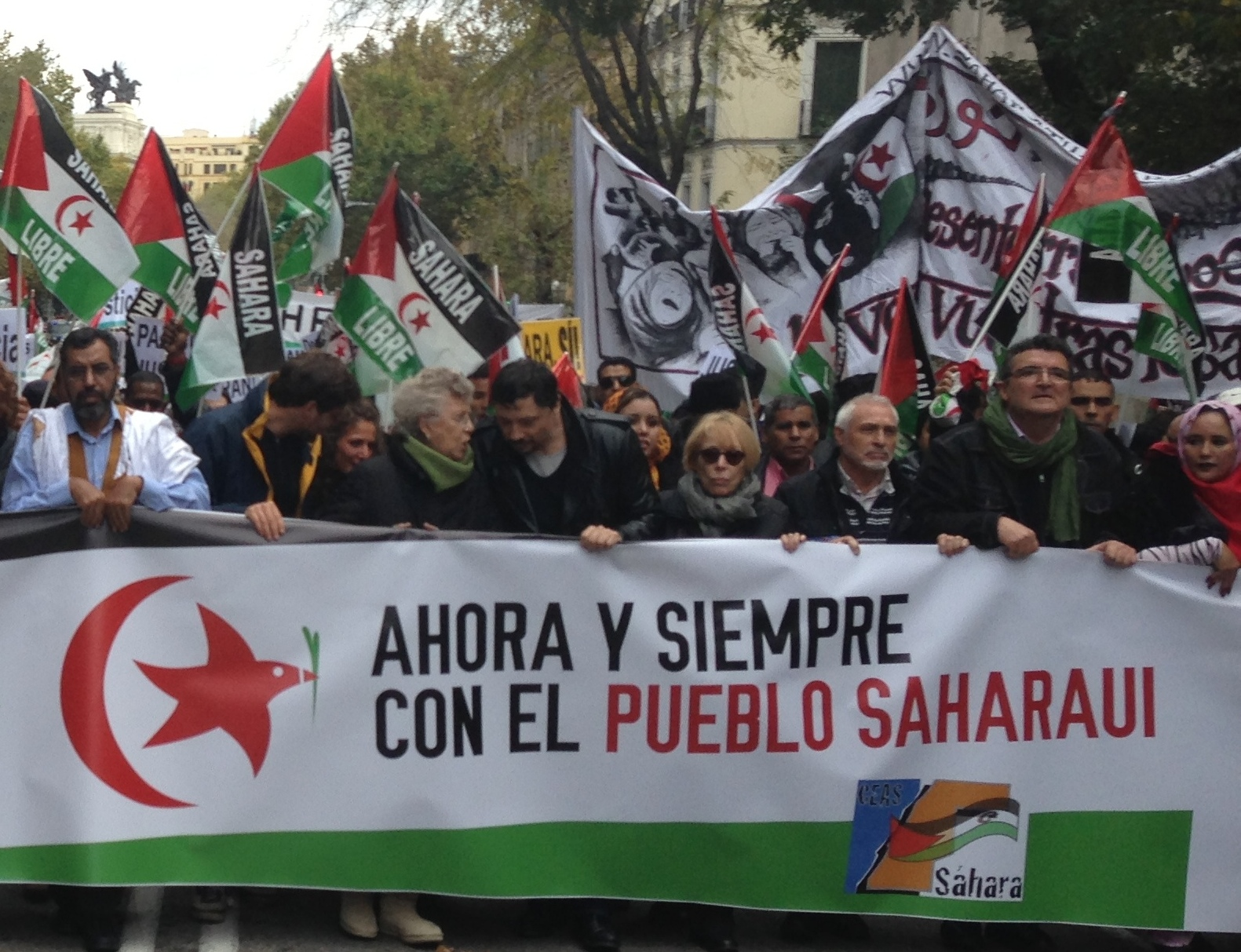
Bardem attending a 2012 demonstration in Madrid in solidarity with the Sahrawi people with her son Carlos

Pilar Bardem was often called "La Bardem", and was well known in Spain not only as an actress, but for her outspoken left-wing political views, particularly close to the party United Left. During the dictatorship of Francisco Franco she remained close to the clandestine Communist Party.

She toiled for "labor rights for actors, civil rights for women", and "a more liberal Catholic Church" (she affirmed a belief that women should be able to become priests). Bardem identified her long struggle, working several jobs at once to raise her children, as not uncommon. She was just "one of so many".

In 2003 Bardem opposed the Spanish government's decision to send troops to Iraq together with other Spanish actors. On 5 February 2003 was invited, among other actors and actresses, to the Congress of Deputies, from which they were evicted after displaying T-shirts and shouting anti-war slogans.

For the 2004 European Parliament election, she was part of the United Left candidacy, but was not elected.

She was a vocal supporter of the Sahrawi cause. In December 2021, during a homage paid to her at the FiSahara, the Polisario delegate to Spain announced that she will be posthumously bestowed the Sahrawi citizenship.

In 2017 her children prepared a surprise tribute for her, in which 1,300 artists participated. During that event, and already ill, she expressed her desire to see the Third Spanish Republic proclaimed before her death.

== Personal life ==
Bardem married José Carlos Encinas Doussinague in October 1961 with whom she had her four children. One of them died shortly after birth. Her three surviving children are Carlos, Mónica, and Javier Bardem. In her book La Bardem she related that her husband abused her. She got a formal church-endorsed separation (Note: Divorce was illegal in Spain) in 1973. Afterwards, she was involved with several actors, among them Agustín González.

She lived in the Retiro district of Madrid and was a big fan of football team FC Barcelona.

Encinas died in December 1995 of leukemia.

== Death ==
A regular smoker, she survived lung cancer.

She died in the Clínica Ruber in Madrid on 17 July 2021, aged 82, after suffering from a serious lung disease since 2013. Her body was later cremated in the Madrid town of San Lorenzo de El Escorial.

== Selected filmography ==
- Good Morning, Little Countess (1967)
- The Rebellious Novice (1971)
- Variety (1971)
- The Doubt (1972)
- La descarriada (1973) as Lucila
- Amor e Dedinhos de Pé (1992)
- Entre rojas (1995)
- La bicicleta (2006)
- Lilly the Witch: The Dragon and the Magic Book (2009)

== Awards and nominations ==
Goya Awards
Year	Category	Work	Result	Ref.
1996	Best Supporting Actress	Nadie hablará de nosotras cuando hayamos muerto	Won	
2005	Best Actress	María querida	Nominated	
