= List of Spanish films of 1962 =

A list of films produced in Spain in 1962 (see 1962 in film).

== 1962 ==
Title	Director	Cast	Genre	Notes
1962
La gran familia	Fernando Palacios	José Luis López Vázquez, Alberto Closas, Amparo Soler Leal, José Isbert	Christmas comedy drama	It was a huge hit, there are two sequels
A hierro muere	Manuel Mur Oti	Alberto de Mendoza, Olga Zubarry		
Accidente 703	José María Forqué	Manuel Alexandre, Ángel Álvarez	Drama	
Atraco a las tres	José María Forqué	José Luis López Vázquez, Gracita Morales, Manuel Alexandre	Black comedy	Inspirated by Mario Monicelli's masterpiece Big Deal on Madonna Street
The Awful Dr. Orloff	Jesus Franco		Horror	Spain's first horror film
Buscando a Mónica	José María Forqué	Alberto de Mendoza, Carmen Sevilla	Drama	
Dulcinea	Vicente Escrivá	Millie Perkins, Folco Lulli, Cameron Mitchell, Walter Santesso	Drama	Co-production with Italy & West Germany
The Robbers	Francisco Rovira Beleta			Entered into the 12th Berlin International Film Festival
You Have the Eyes of a Deadly Woman	José María Elorrieta	Susana Campos, Virgílio Teixeira, Marta Padovan	Comedy	
