= María Luisa Merlo =

Spanish actress

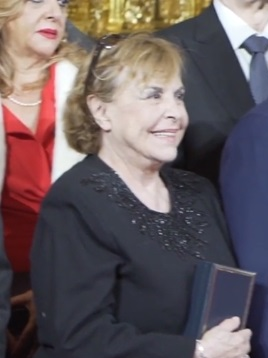
- Merlo in 2017
- Born: María Luisa Merlo Colomina; 6 September 1941 (age 84); Valencia
- Occupation: Actress
- Years active: 1957–present
- Spouse: Carlos Larrañaga (m. 1961; div. 1983) Michael Kenton (m. 1992; div. 1997)
- Children: Luis Merlo; Amparo Larrañaga; Pedro; Juan Carlos (stepson)

María Luisa Merlo Colomina (born 6 September 1941) is a Spanish film, theatre and television actress.

Merlo, with more than 60 years of artistic career, has received the prestigious Gold Medal of Merit in the Fine Arts from the Spanish Ministry of Culture.

She is the mother of actors Luis Merlo and Amparo Larrañaga.

== Early life ==
Merlo was born in Valencia in 1941. She is the daughter of actors Ismael Merlo Piquer and María Luisa Colomina Domingo.

She was raised following her parents' theatre company; as a result, she was able to attend school for less than two years.

== Career ==
Merlo made her debut as a dancer in the 1957 show Te espero en el Eslava by Luis Escobar Kirkpatrick.

She made her cinema debut in 1959 with José María Forqué in the film De espaldas a la puerta. Other titles followed during the first half of the sixties, such as Siempre es domingo (1961) by Fernando Palacios, Cuidado con las personas formales (1961) by Agustín Palacios, Más bonita que ninguna (1965) by Luis César Amadori, with Rocío Dúrcal, and De cuerpo presente (1967) by Antonio Eceiza.

However, from 1965 onward, she focused more on her theatre and television career.

Since the mid-sixties she has become a regular face on Spanish television, playing dozens of roles in Primera fila, Novela and Estudio 1.

In 1973, she starred alongside her then-husband Carlos Larrañaga in the TVE comedy Compañera te doy. 13 years later, she played alongside her daughter, Amparo Larrañaga, in the series Media naranja; in 2006, she did the same with her son, Luis Merlo, in Aquí no hay quien viva.

She has also appeared in the series Aquí hay negocio (1995), Luna negra (2003), Mis adorable vecinos (2004), Supervillanos (2006), Los Serrano (2008) and Somos cómplices (2009).

At the end of 2007, she participated in the sixth edition of the television contest ¡Mira quién baila!

In July 2013, she starred in the short film Betiko, directed by Arantza Ibarra, together with the actor Javier Pradera in the caves of Zugarramurdi.

== Personal life ==
Merlo was married to the actor Carlos Larrañaga for 15 years; they separated in 1975 and obtained a divorce in November 1983. Besides a son, Juan Carlos, from Carlos previous marriage, they had three children: Amparo Larrañaga, Luis Merlo and Pedro.

In 1992, she married university professor Michael Kenton, whom she divorced five years later.

An authoritative biography of Merlo, María Luisa Merlo: Más allá del teatro, was published in 2003 by playwright Pedro Víllora.

== Filmography ==
=== Film ===
Year	Title	Role	Note
2017	Es ley de vida	Esperanza	Short film
2008	Proyecto Dos		
2003	El dolor y la lluvia		Short film
1982	En septiembre	Ana	
1981	¿Por qué no hacemos el amor?	Laura Battoni	
1975	El adúltero	Marta	
1975	Un lujo a su alcance	Olga	
1974	Tocata y fuga de Lolita	Olga	
1972	Ligue Story	Dr. Somontes	
1967	De cuerpo presente	just-married woman	
1965	Más bonita que ninguna		
1961	Cuidado con las personas formales		
1961	Siempre es domingo	Dorotea / Doris	
1961	Armas contra la ley		
1961	Mi noche de bodas	Ivonne	
1960	091 Policía al habla	Teresa Jiménez	
1960	El cerro de los locos		
1959	De espaldas a la puerta	Lucky	

=== Television ===
Year	Title	Notes
2009	Somos cómplices	
2008	Aída	Episode: "Paz la dulce"
2008	Hospital Central	Episode: "Un entierro, una boda y un cumpleaños"
2008	Los Serrano	Episode: "El camino recto de Santa Justa"
2006	Con dos tacones	Episode: "Alabaré a mi señor"
2006	Supervillanos	
2006	7 vidas	Episode: "Nacida el 4 de julio"
2004-2006	Aquí no hay quien viva	
2004	Mis adorables vecinos	
2003	Luna negra	
1995	Aquí hay negocio	
1989	Primera función	2 episodes
1986	La comedia dramática española	Episode: "Diálogo secreto"
1986	Media naranja	
1978	Teatro estudio	Episode: "El bebé furioso"
1977	Mujeres insólitas	Episode: "La viuda roja"
1975	Cuentos y leyendas	Episode: "La leyenda del Caballero de Olmedo"
1966–1981	Estudio 1	24 episodes
1974	Telecomedia	Episode: "Comedia de boulevard"
1974	El teatro	Episode: "El proceso de Mary Dugan"
1974	Noche de teatro	Episode: "Cisneros"
1973	Compañera te doy	episodes
1972	Siete piezas cortas	Episode: "El chantajista"
1968	La pequeña comedia	Episode: "Claveles en la oficina"
1966–1981	Teatro breve	3 episodes
1966	Hermenegildo Pérez, para servirle	Episode: "Un marido futuro, muy futuro"
1966	El tercer rombo	3 episodes
1965	Tiempo y hora	2 episodes
1965	Confidencias	Episode: "La ilusión de cada uno"
1964	Escuela de maridos	Episode: "Carácter sí, carácter no"
1964	Tras la puerta cerrada	Episode: "El ángel negro"
1964–1965	Primera fila	7 episodes
1963–1977	Novela	13 episodes

=== Theatre ===
Her career on the stage is marked by the performance of works of all genres, from drama to comedy, including musicals. In 1986 she joined the Compañía Nacional de Teatro Clásico.

Year	Title	Writer	Note
1957	Te espero en el Eslava		
1958	Ven y ven al Eslava		
1960	Diana está comunicando		
1967	La tercera palabra		
1968	Siete gritos en el mar		
1968	El proceso de Mary Dugan		
1970	Vidas privadas		
1971	Cómo ama la otra mitad	Alan Ayckbourn	
1972	Pato a la naranja	William Douglas-Home	
1974	Los peces rojos		
1977	Los hijos de Kennedy	Robert Patrick	
1977	Yo quiero a mi mujer		
1978	Lecciones de matrimonio		
1979	Alicia en el París de las maravillas		
1980	El corto vuelo del gallo	Jaime Salom	With Gemma Cuervo
1984	No corran que es peor		Adapted by Juanjo Menéndez
1984	Diálogo secreto	Antonio Buero Vallejo	With Ismael Merlo
1986	Los locos de Valencia	Lope de Vega	Directed by Adolfo Marsillach
1987	Antes que todo es mi dama	Calderón de la Barca	
1991	Trescientos veintiuno, trescientos veintidós	Ana Diosdado	
1994	Los bellos durmientes	Antonio Gala	Alongside Amparo Larrañaga
1998	Odio a Hamlet	Paul Rudnick	
1999	Ocho mujeres	Robert Thomas	
2000	La fiebre del heno	Noël Coward	
2003	El adefesio	Rafael Alberti	
2006	Yo, Leonor		
2006-2007	La ratonera	Agatha Christie	
2007	Un adulterio casi decente		With Pedro Civera
2011	100 metros cuadrados	Juan Carlos Rubio	
2015	Cosas de papá y mamá	Alfonso Paso	
2019	Conversaciones con mamá	Mario Martín Lucas	

== Awards ==
In 1967, Merlo was awarded with the Antena de Oro de Televisión Prize. She was awarded the Ercilla Theatre Prize in 2009 for her career in theatre. In 2013, she was awarded the Distinction of the Generalitat Valenciana for Cultural Merit. The Spanish Ministry of Culture awarded Merlo the Gold Medal of Merit in the Fine Arts in 2017.
