= Heaven at Home =

- Directed by: Tulio Demicheli
- Written by: Alfonso Paso (play); Luis Marquina; Tulio Demicheli
- Produced by: Marciano de la Fuente; Miguel Tudela
- Starring: Alberto Closas; Marga López; Rafael Alonso
- Cinematography: José F. Aguayo
- Edited by: Antonio Ramírez de Loaysa
- Music by: Gregorio García Segura
- Production companies: AS Films; Tarfe Films
- Distributed by: AS Films
- Release date: 7 December 1960
- Running time: 94 minutes
- Country: Spain
- Language: Spanish

Heaven at Home (Spanish:El cielo dentro de la casa or Navidades en junio) is a 1960 Spanish comedy film directed by Tulio Demicheli and starring Alberto Closas, Marga López and Rafael Alonso.

The film's sets were designed by the art director Enrique Alarcón.

== Cast ==
- Alberto Closas as Dr. Julio Medina
- Marga López as Laura Medina
- Rafael Alonso as Daniel
- José Luis López Vázquez as Oltrán
- María del Puy as Susana
- Tony Soler as Mercedes
- Gracita Morales as Paciente
- Juan Cortés as Solitario seductor
- José Morales as Camarero
- Mercedes Barranco as Vendedora de lotería
- Gregorio Alonso
- Rafael Corés
- Pepita C. Velázquez
- Nélida Romero
- Dolores Villadres
- Consuelo Durán
- Montserrat Blanch
- Maite Blasco as Luisa
- María Victoria Ayllón
- Ana María Puerto

== Bibliography ==
- John King & Nissa Torrents. The Garden of Forking Paths: Argentine Cinema. British Film Institute, 1988.
