= Police Calling 091 =

- Spanish: 091 Policía al habla
- Directed by: José María Forqué
- Written by: Vicente Coello; José María Forqué; Pedro Masó; Antonio Vich
- Produced by: José María Forqué; Pedro Masó
- Starring: Adolfo Marsillach; Tony Leblanc; Susana Campos
- Cinematography: Juan Mariné
- Edited by: Antonio Ramírez de Loaysa
- Music by: Augusto Algueró
- Production company: AS Films Producciones
- Distributed by: AS Films
- Release date: 8 November 1960
- Running time: 96 minutes
- Country: Spain
- Language: Spanish

Police Calling 091 (Spanish: 091 Policía al habla) is a 1960 Spanish crime film directed by José María Forqué and starring Adolfo Marsillach, Tony Leblanc and Susana Campos.

== Synopsis ==
A police inspector who performs the emergency night patrol service (091) is obsessed by the death of his daughter who was hit by a car that then fled. When his colleagues locate the vehicle, he personally goes to arrest the driver.

== Cast ==
- Adolfo Marsillach as Andrés Martín
- Tony Leblanc as Charles
- Susana Campos as Julia
- José Luis López Vázquez as Lorenzo Barea
- Manolo Gómez Bur as Bicho
- María Luisa Merlo as Teresa Jiménez
- Francisco Cornet
- Javier Fleta
- Pilar Cano
- Luis Peña as Julio
- Manuel Alexandre as Luciano
- Mara Laso as Charo
- Ana Castor as Sole
- Ángel de Andrés as Manolo
- Julia Gutiérrez Caba as mother of the sick child
- Francisco Arenzana as Juan
- Héctor Bianciotti
- Gracita Morales as clerk
- Antonio Casas as Teresa's father
- Asunción Balaguer as Elena
- Mary Paz Pondal as Pilar Lorente García
- Jesús Guzmán as armed police officer
- María Luisa Corominas
- Irene Gutiérrez Caba as Embarazada
- José Orjas
- Mercedes Barranco as Luciano's girlfriend
- Pedro Rodríguez de Quevedo
- Agustín González as Pío
- Ana María Ventura as Sunday woman
- Diego Hurtado
- Lola del Pino
- Antonio Queipo
- Ángel Álvarez
- Joaquín Pamplona
- Pablo Sanz
- Juan Cortés
- Vicente Bañó
- Luis Morris
- Fernando Delgado
- Antonio Armet
- Antonio Ferrandis as policeman
- Fred Galiana as Fred Galiana
- Manolo García as Manolo García
- Manuel Aguilera as Encargado de Casa Manolo
- Manuel Arbó as chief inspector
- Ángel del Pozo
- Rafael Hernández as policeman
- Marisa Paredes
