= Anchor Button =

Anchor Button may refer to:

- Anchor Button (1948 film), a 1948 Spanish comedy film
- Anchor Button (1961 film), a 1961 Spanish musical comedy film
