= My Wedding Night =

- Directed by: Tulio Demicheli
- Written by: Istvan Skeffi (play); André Solt (play); Tulio Demicheli; José Manuel Iglesias; Víctor Ruiz Iriarte
- Produced by: Cesáreo González; Benito Perojo
- Cinematography: José F. Aguayo
- Edited by: Antonio Ramírez de Loaysa
- Production companies: Cesáreo González Producciones Cinematográficas; Producciones Benito Perojo
- Distributed by: Ízaro Films
- Release date: 5 June 1961
- Running time: 85 minutes
- Countries: Mexico; Spain
- Language: Spanish

My Wedding Night (Spanish: Mi noche de bodas) is a 1961 Mexican-Spanish comedy film directed by Tulio Demicheli and starring Concha Velasco, Luis Aguilar and Rafael Alonso.

== Cast ==
- Concha Velasco as Fernanda Jiménez
- Luis Aguilar as Pedro
- Rafael Alonso as Cosme Martínez
- Isabel Garcés as Gabriela
- María Luisa Merlo as Ivonne
- Lina Canalejas
- Gracita Morales as Enriqueta
- Mari Carmen Prendes as Elena
- Hugo Pimentel
- Carlota Bilbao
- José Orjas as Camarero
- Manuel de Juan
- Montserrat Blanch
- Juan Cortés
- Agustín González as Alfonso López de Tovar
- Emilio Rodríguez
- José Morales
- A.R. de Quevedo
- Rafael Corés
- Antonio Braña
- Giove Campuzano
- Carmen Pérez Gallo
- Tony Leblanc as Juan
- Goyo Lebrero as Sereno

== Bibliography ==
- John King & Nissa Torrents. The Garden of Forking Paths: Argentine Cinema. British Film Institute, 1988.
