= Sor Citroën =

- Spanish theatrical release poster
- Directed by: Pedro Lazaga
- Screenplay by: Pedro Masó; Rafael J. Salvia
- Starring: Gracita Morales; José Luis López Vázquez; Rafaela Aparicio; Juanjo Menéndez; Mari Carmen Prendes; Rafael Alonso; Andrés Mejuto; Antonio Ferrandis; José Sacristán
- Cinematography: Juan Mariné
- Edited by: Alfonso Santacana
- Music by: Antón García Abril
- Color process: Eastmancolor
- Production companies: Pedro Masó Producciones Cinematográficas; Filmayer Producción, S.A.
- Distributed by: Filmayer S.A.
- Release date: 5 December 1967 (Spain)
- Running time: 94 minutes
- Country: Spain
- Language: Spanish

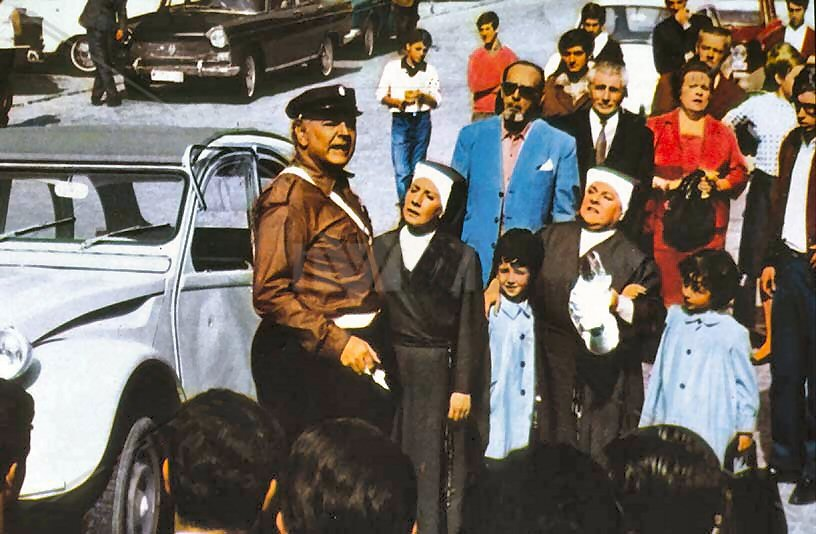
Gracita Morales as Sister Tomasa (left) and Rafaela Aparicio as Sister Rafaela (right) in a scene of the film

Sor Citroën, or Sor Citroen, is a 1967 Spanish comedy film directed by Pedro Lazaga and starring Gracita Morales as Sister Tomasa, a nun who drives a Citroën 2CV.

== Plot ==
A community of nuns who run an orphanage for girls decides to get motorized and they buy a Citroën 2CV. Sister Tomasa, an impulsive and outgoing nun who has just arrived to the community, is the one to learn to drive. At first she is not very good at it, jeopardizing traffic on several occasions, so she is nicknamed "Sor Citroën" ("Sister Citroën"). When she finally gets the driving license, she dedicates together with Sister Rafaela to drive through the streets of Madrid asking for charity for the orphanage.

== Cast ==
- Gracita Morales as Sister Tomasa / Sor Citroën
- José Luis López Vázquez as "El Cuchillas"
- Rafaela Aparicio as Sister Rafaela
- Juanjo Menéndez as Father Jerónimo
- Mari Carmen Prendes as Superior Mother
- Rafael Alonso as driving examiner
- Andrés Mejuto as Tomasa's Father
- Antonio Ferrandis as Don Paco, the Police commissioner
- José Sacristán as street vendor
- Jesús Guzmán as street vendor
- Margot Cottens as "La Trini"

== Production ==
=== Filming ===
Shooting locations included Madrid, Alcalá de Henares and La Robla (León).

=== Censorship ===
The film had to deal during production with Francoist film censors. A scene that was showing the nuns having soup in the refectory while one of them recites the traffic laws was cut off as inappropriate.

== Legacy ==
=== In popular culture ===
The Citroën 2CV is usually listed as one of the most iconic cars in the history of Spanish cinema for its role in this film.
