= Vicente Haro =

Spanish actor (1930–2010)

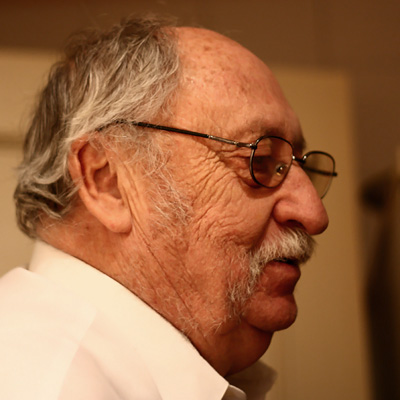
- Vicente Haro in 2010
- Born: Vicente Haro Marón; 1 November 1930; Madrid
- Died: 14 April 2010 (aged 79); Madrid
- Occupation: Actor

Vicente Haro Marón (1 November 1930 – 14 April 2010) was a Spanish film, TV and theater actor. He starred in films with Agustín González, Fernando Guillén, Jesús Puente, Juanjo Menéndez, Manuel Alexandre, José Bódalo, Juan Diego and Emilio Gutiérrez Caba. He married actress Ana María Vidal, with whom he had a son, Vicente Haro Vidal. He was also the father of actor Enrique San Francisco, but did not meet him until Enrique was seventeen years old. Enrique hasn't got the surname Haro because his mother, actress Enriqueta Cobo, was very angry with Vicente. He died on 14 April 2010 at age 80.

== Filmography ==
=== Film ===
- Botón de ancla (1961) - Enrique
- Vampiresas 1930 (1962)
- Llovidos del cielo (1962)
- Cerrado por asesinato (1964)
- Pistol for a Hundred Coffins (1968) - Officer
- Relaciones casi públicas (1968) - Fotógrafo
- Un adulterio decente (1969) - Galán
- Las colocadas (1972) - (uncredited)
- Experiencia prematrimonial (1972)
- Secuestro a la española (1972)
- The Crimes of Petiot (1973) - Inspector Muller
- El señor está servido (1976)
- El anacoreta (1976) - Maitre
- Pepito Piscina (1978)
- El día del presidente (1979)
- El donante (1985) - Comercial 1
- Orquesta Club Virginia (1992) - Médico hospital español
- Tierra (1996) - Alcalde
- Corsarios del chip (1996) - Juez (Judge)
- El ángel de la guarda (1996) - Coronel
- El tiempo de la felicidad (1997) - Médico
- Pepe Guindo (1999) - Productor
- Maestros (2000)
- Manolito Gafotas en ¡Mola ser jefe! (2001) - Nicolás, El Abuelo
- Clara y Elena (2001) - Vicente
- 20 Centimeters (2005) - Padre del Reponedor
- Bienvenido a casa (2006) - Don Vicente

=== Television ===
- Gran teatro (1961–1962)
- Estudio 3 (1963–1964) - Oakley
- Primera fila (1963–1965) - Julian / Razumijin / Sergio Paulovicht
- Novela (1963–1976) - Joe / Plornish / Demetrio / Moises / Sergio / Padrino 1 / Valladares / Mayodomo
- Tengo un libro en las manos (1964)
- Teatro de familia (1964)
- Teatro de humor (1965)
- Tú tranquilo (1965)
- El tercer rombo (1966)
- Estudio 1 (1966–1973) - Juan / Tìrito / Luciano / Chipirrisqui / Pacheco / Primera Voz Celeste / Galán / Abogado / Barman / Sebastián / Los Pretendientes / El piloto / Don Lupo
- Historias de hoy (1967)
- Y al final esperanza (1967)
- Dichoso mundo (1967)
- Los encuentros (1967) - Leonardo
- Teatro de siempre (1968–1972) - Apuntador
- Al filo de lo imposible (1970) - Gaspar
- Hora once (1970–1973)
- Pequeño estudio (1973)
- Cuentos y leyendas (1974–1975) - Luis
- El teatro (1975) - Mercadero 2
- Teatro estudio (1976)
- Primera función (1989) - Jack
- Los ladrones van a la oficina (1994)
- Farmacia de guardia (1994–1995) - Segundo Melchor
- Colegio Mayor (1994–1996) - Felipe
- Pepa y Pepe (1995) - Joaquín
- Médico de familia (1996)
- Al salir de clase (1997–1998) - Alfonso Medina
- La casa de los líos (1998) - Jeque Mulay
- Raquel busca su sitio (2000)
- Robles, investigador (2000–2001) - Arsenio
- Hospital Central (2003–2007) - Fulgencio Valladares / Mauricio Armendia Ballester
- El comisario (2005)
- Hermanos y detectives (2007)
- U.C.O. (2009) - Alfredo
- ¿Qué fue de Jorge Sanz? (2010) - Padre Jorge (final appearance)

=== Theater ===
- Panorama desde el puente (1952)
- Tiempo de espadas (1972)
- ¿Dónde están mis pantalones? (1988)
- El arrogante español (1991)
- Los intereses creados (1992)
- Los verdes campos del Edén
- Eloísa está debajo de un almendro
- La ratonera
- Boing – Boing
- Tres testigos
- Juegos de media noche
- Las tres perfectas casadas
- A dos barajas
- Un enemigo del pueblo
- Sé infiel y no mires con quién
