= You Have the Eyes of a Deadly Woman =

You Have the Eyes of a Deadly Woman may refer to:

- Usted tiene ojos de mujer fatal (play) (English: You Have the Eyes of a Deadly Woman), a play by Enrique Jardiel Poncela
- You Have the Eyes of a Deadly Woman (1947 film), a Mexican romantic comedy film, adapted from the play
- You Have the Eyes of a Deadly Woman (1962 film), a Spanish comedy film, adapted from the play
