= La ciudad no es para mí =

1966 film

- Spanish theatrical release poster
- Directed by: Pedro Lazaga
- Screenplay by: Pedro Masó; Vicente Coello
- Based on: La ciudad no es para mí by Fernando Ángel Lozano
- Starring: Paco Martínez Soria; Doris Coll; Eduardo Fajardo; Cristina Galbó; Alfredo Landa; Gracita Morales
- Cinematography: Juan Mariné
- Music by: Antón García Abril
- Production company: Pedro Masó Producciones Cinematográficas
- Distributed by: Filmayer S.A.
- Release date: 14 March 1966
- Running time: 1h 36min
- Country: Spain
- Language: Spanish
- Budget: 5 million pesetas
- Box office: 65,645,694 pesetas ($0.9 million)

La ciudad no es para mí (transl. City is not for me) is a 1966 Spanish comedy film directed by Pedro Lazaga and based on the play of the same name by Fernando Lázaro Carreter published under the pen name Fernando Ángel Lozano. It stars Paco Martínez Soria as Agustín Valverde, an old widower peasant from the Aragonese village of Calacierva who decides to go to Madrid to live with his son and daughter-in-law.

It was the highest-grossing Spanish film between 1965 and 1968 with 65,645,694 pesetas.

== Cast ==
- Paco Martínez Soria as Agustín Valverde
- Doris Coll as Luciana "Luchi"
- Eduardo Fajardo as Dr. Agustín Valverde II
- Cristina Galbó as Sara
- Alfredo Landa as Genaro
- Gracita Morales as Filo
- José Sacristán as Venancio
- Margot Cottens as Geno
- María Luisa Ponte as Carolina
- Sancho Gracia as Dr. Ricardo Torres
