= What Have I Done to Deserve This? =

What Have I Done to Deserve This? may refer to:

- What Have I Done to Deserve This? (film), a 1984 film by Pedro Almodóvar
- "What Have I Done to Deserve This?" (song), a song by Pet Shop Boys and Dusty Springfield
- "What Have I Done to Deserve This?" (Grey's Anatomy), an episode of the TV series Grey's Anatomy
