= Maestros (film) =

- Directed by: Óscar del Caz
- Screenplay by: Óscar del Caz; José Manuel Martín
- Produced by: Beatriz Navarrete; Óscar del Caz; Michael Aguiló
- Starring: Manuel Alexandre; Álvaro de Luna; Jesús Guzmán; Conrado San Martín; Tomás Zori
- Cinematography: Ángel Iguacel
- Production companies: El Paso PC; El Álamo PC
- Release date: 2000
- Country: Spain
- Language: Spanish

Maestros is a 2000 Spanish comedy film directed by Óscar del Caz starring veteran actors Manuel Alexandre, Alvaro de Luna, and Jesús Guzmán with supporting roles from Conrado San Martín, Frank Braña, and Tomás Zori.

== Plot ==
The plot tracks a group of five senior bank robbers and bullfighters who decide to pull a heist after begrudgingly accepting their liberation from a 30-year-long spell in jail.

== Cast ==
- Manuel Alexandre
- Álvaro de Luna
- Jesús Guzmán
- Conrado San Martín
- Tomás Zori
- Paloma Cela
- Txema Blasco
- Frank Braña
- Concha Leza
- Miguel Motta
- Asunción Díaz Alcuaz
- Domingo Chinchilla
- Tomás del Estal
- Eduardo Gómez
- Antonio Holgado
- Susú Benítez
- José Manuel Moya
- Paloma Montero
- Felipe Santos
- José Soler
- José Luis García Aguila
- Miguel Fernández 'Mixi'
- Carlos del Moral
- Julio Tejela
- Enrique Ginés
- Antonio de la Fuente as Empleado 2
- Jorge Fuentes
- Paco Merino
- Mirta Miller
- Vicente Haro
- José Carabias
- Paco Catalá
- Joan Molina
- José Cantero
- Manolo Gil
- Manolo Melero
- Emilio Mencheta
- José Copete Téllez
- José Manuel Montolíu
- Vicente García Zapater
- José Luis Villaverde
- Javier Manzano
- Miguel Mota

== Production ==
The screenplay was written by del Caz alongside José Manuel Martín. The film is an El Paso PC and El Álamo PC production. Shooting locations included Madrid (Carabanchel, Yeserías), Valencia, and Alcalá de Henares.

== See also ==
- List of Spanish films of 2000
