= Nuria Torray =

Spanish actress

- Born: Nuria Torra Resplandi; 24 September 1934; Barcelona, Spain
- Died: 8 June 2004 (aged 69); Madrid, Spain
- Occupation: Actress
- Years active: 1957-1989
- Spouse: Juan Guerrero Zamora

Nuria Torray (24 September 1934 – 8 June 2004) was a Spanish film, television and theatre actress.

== Career ==
=== Television ===
Torray also made numerous appearances in television productions including the television series Un Mito Llamado....

=== Theatre ===
Additionally, she is known from her appearance in the stage play Mi Querida Familia.

== Personal ==
Torray was married to the director Juan Guerrero Zamora, with whom she also worked, especially on television.

She died of colon cancer in Madrid, Spain in 2004.

== Filmography ==
- 1957: Susana y yo - Estudiante #1
- 1957: Maravilla - Anita
- 1957: Un marido de ida y vuelta - Mariví
- 1961: ¡Aquí están las vicetiples! - Carmen
- 1962: Accidente 703 - Luisa
- 1962: Una jaula no tiene secretos
- 1962: Dar la cara - Pelusa
- 1963: La becerrada - Sor Leocadia
- 1963: Se vive una vez
- 1963: Benigno, hermano mío
- 1964: El hombre de la diligencia - Ruth
- 1964: Prohibido soñar
- 1964: El señor de La Salle - Bernarda
- 1964: Juegos peligrosos
- 1965: Diálogos de la paz - Amparo
- 1965: Albergues y paradores
- 1966: Las salvajes en Puente San Gil
- 1966: Eroe vagabondo
- 1966: Dos mil dólares por Coyote - Mary Patterson
- 1966: Django no perdona
- 1966: Una novia relámpago
- 1967: El Amor Brujo - Soledad
- 1967: Los amores difíciles
- 1967: Los siete de Pancho Villa - María
- 1967: El halcón de Castilla - Margarita
- 1968: Camino de la verdad
- 1969: La muchacha del Nilo - Aysha
- 1969: La reverencia (Short)
- 1970: Quel maledetto giorno d'inverno... Django e Sartana all'ultimo sangue
- 1970: Trasplante de un cerebro - Susan
- 1971: El bosque del lobo - Avelina
- 1972: La casa de las muertas vivientes - Sara
- 1972: Fuenteovejuna
- 1976: El caballero de la mano en el pecho - Jerónima
- 1984: Carta a nadie
