= Montserrat Blanch =

Montserrat Blanch Ferrer (b. 1903 - d. Madrid; February 1995) was a Spanish actress.

== Biography ==
Sister of the actors José and Modesto Blanch and aunt of Jaime Blanch. She was an essentially theatrical actress. Her career dates back to the 1920s. She joined Carmen Díaz's company, where she shared the stage with actors Rafael Bardem, Matilde Muñoz Sampedro, and Julia Lajos in plays including La maja, by Luis Fernández Ardavín, Los duendes de Sevilla (1929), by the Álvarez Quintero Brothers, La de los claveles dobles (1930), by Luis de Vargas, or El susto (1933), by the Quintero family. Later, with Josefina Díaz de Artigas, she appeared in Mañana me mato (1935), by Pérez Fernández, and in 1937 she starred in Electra, by Benito Pérez Galdós at the Teatro Español.

After the Spanish Civil War she returned to her career and in 1940 premiered Clara Boothe's Mujeres. Shortly after, she joined Irene López Heredia's company, with whom she played Sutton Vane's (El viaje infinito, 1943) and Darío Niccomedi's La sombra (1944).

In the 1950s, after starring in Tennessee Williams' El zoo de cristal (1952), she joined Mariano Asquerino in the premiere of Rafael Martí Orberá's La mujer de Pilatos (1956) and Mercedes Prendes in John Patrick's La desconcertante Señora Savage (1959).

In 1960, she obtained great commercial success with the premiere of Alfonso Paso's La boda de la chica, and a year later she performed again in El zoo de cristal starring Berta Riaza. In the following years she appeared in the productions Premio para un asesino (1962), by Frederick Knott, Los monos gritan al amanecer (1963), by José María Pemán, Las chicas del taller (1963), by Juan Ignacio Luca de Tena, with Pastor Serrador, Don Juan Tenorio (1963), at the Teatro Español, La culpa es tuya (1965), by Jacinto Benavente, with Rafael Alonso, El precio de los sueños (1966), by Carlos Muñiz, La factura (1969), directed by Luis Escobar and starring Conchita Montes; El escaloncito (1969), by David Turner, with Florinda Chico, at the Teatro Maravillas, Andorra (1971), by Max Frisch, and Diez negritos (1977), by Agatha Christie.

In addition to her extensive theatrical career, she participated in the shooting of a dozen films, including Basilio Martín Patino's Nueve cartas a Berta (1966). She also appeared occasionally in television programs such as Estudio 1.
