= Más bonita que ninguna =

- Directed by: Luis César Amadori
- Written by: Jesús María de Arozamena; Luis César Amadori
- Produced by: Luis Sanz; Cámara Producciones Cinematográficas
- Starring: Rocío Dúrcal; Luigi Giuliani; Gracita Morales; Tomás Blanco; María Luisa Merlo; Pedro Porcel; José María Caffarel; Jesús Puente; Jesús Guzmán; María Isbert; Mercedes Barranco; Tota Alba; Luis Morris; Joaquín Pamplona; Félix Navarro; Valentín Tornos
- Release date: 1965
- Running time: 114 minutes
- Country: Spain
- Language: Spanish

Más bonita que ninguna is a 1965 Spanish musical comedy film directed by Luis César Amadori. It stars Spanish singer and actress Rocío Dúrcal and Italian actor Luigi Giuliani.

The script, story, and dialogue were written by Jesús María de Arozamena and Gabriel Peña (Amadori's pseudonym). The film's main theme of the same name, performed by Dúrcal, was enormously popular at the time. Furthermore, two of the film's songs ("Los dos" and "Los borrachos," a version of "Borracho") were composed by the popular band of the time, Los Brincos. During filming, Dúrcal met her future husband, Junior, who was a member of Los Brincos at the time.

Other songs on the soundtrack were composed by de Arozamena and Fernando Moraleda, and by Augusto Algueró and Antonio Guijarro.

== Plot summary ==
Luisa (Dúrcal) and Roberto (Giuliani) are a couple in love who, despite this, are not as sincere to each other as they should be. Luisa claims she works at Telefónica when she is actually a match girl at the El Molino Verde cabaret, something she hasn't told her boyfriend. She is greatly surprised when she discovers that the same venue is hosting a bachelor party, organized specifically for Roberto, who is about to marry a wealthy heiress. To fight for his love, Luisa will adopt the role of "Luisito," her twin brother, and under this guise, she will confront Roberto and his future in-laws.
