= Rafaela Aparicio =

Spanish actress

The Most Excellent Rafaela Aparicio
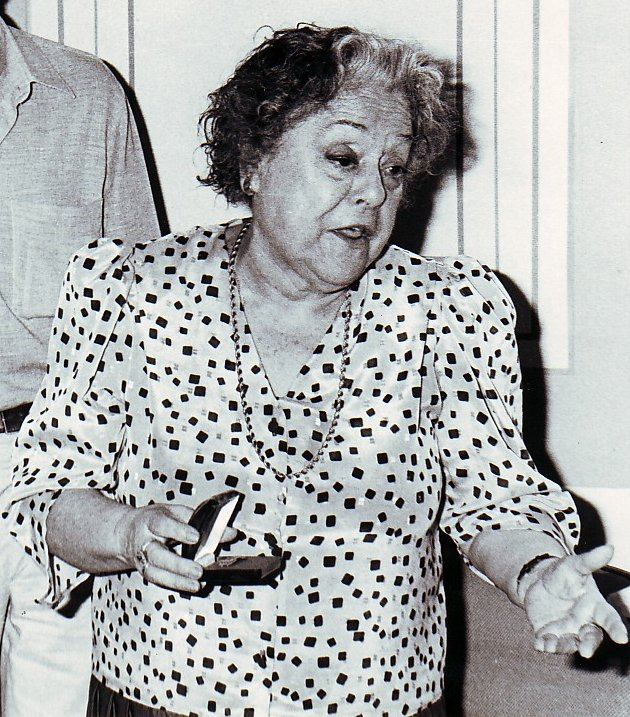
- Born: Rafaela Díaz Valiente; 9 April 1906; Marbella (Málaga), Spain
- Died: 9 June 1996 (aged 90); Madrid, Spain
- Occupation: Actress
- Years active: 1935–1996
- Spouse: Erasmo Pascual (1936-1975; his death)
- Children: 1

Rafaela Díaz Valiente (9 April 1906 – 9 June 1996) better known as Rafaela Aparicio was a famous Spanish film and theatre actress.

She made more than 100 films. The most remembered are Carlos Saura's Anna and the Wolves, Mama Turns 100 and Fernando Fernán Gómez's El extraño viaje. She died of a stroke in Madrid in a retirement home.

== Selected filmography ==
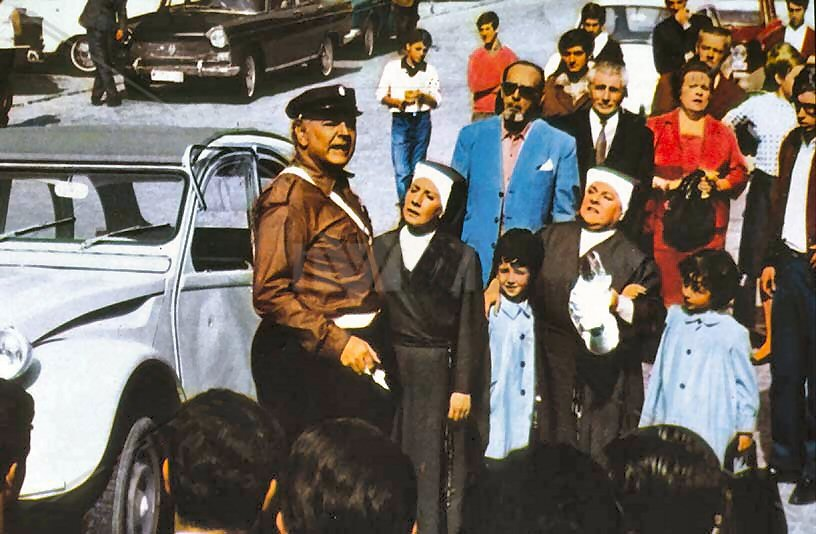
Gracita Morales as Sister Tomasa (left) and Rafaela Aparicio as Sister Rafaela (right) in Sor Citroën.

Year	Title	Role	Notes
1935	Juan Simón's Daughter	Gregoria	
1956	The Big Lie	La Molina neighbour	
1957	The Last Torch Song	Singer	
1958	La vida por delante		
1959	La vida alrededor		
1960	The Football Lottery		
1962	Atraco a las tres		
1962	The Mustard Grain		
1963	The Daughters of Helena		
1963	La becerrada	Sor Inmaculada	
1964	El extraño viaje	Paquita Vidal	
1965	Television Stories	Don Marcelino's maid	
1966	He's My Man!	Mrs. Calixta	
1967	Love in Flight		
1967	Another's Wife		
1967	Sor Citroën	Sister Rafaela	
1968	Cristina Guzmán	Balbina	
1973	Anna and the Wolves	The mother	
1977	Change of Sex	Pilar	
1979	Mama Turns 100	The mother	
1983	The South	Milagros	
1985	Padre nuestro		
1986	Year of Enlightment	Rafaela	
1989	The Sea and the Weather	Grandmother	

== Honours ==
- Gold Medal of Merit in Labour (Kingdom of Spain, 23 April 1976).
