= The Mustard Grain =

- Spanish: El grano de mostaza
- Directed by: José Luis Sáenz de Heredia
- Written by: José Luis Sáenz de Heredia
- Starring: Manolo Gómez Bur; Rafael Alonso; Amparo Soler Leal; Gracita Morales; José Bódalo
- Cinematography: José F. Aguayo
- Edited by: Julio Peña
- Music by: Juan Quintero
- Production companies: AS Producción; Tarfe Films
- Distributed by: AS Films
- Release date: 30 August 1962
- Running time: 87 minutes
- Country: Spain
- Language: Spanish

The Mustard Grain (Spanish: El grano de mostaza) is a 1962 Spanish comedy film directed and written by José Luis Sáenz de Heredia. It stars Manolo Gómez Bur, Rafael Alonso, Amparo Soler Leal, Gracita Morales and José Bódalo.

== Plot ==
The storyline features a game of dominoes that results in an argument between Evelio and Horcajo and a challenge that could be deadly. As the game progresses, much effort is exerted to avoid that outcome over the course of 24 hours.

== Cast ==
- Manolo Gómez Bur as Evelio
- Rafael Alonso as Leoncio Toledano
- Amparo Soler Leal as Matilde, mujer de Leoncio
- Gracita Morales as Mujer de Evelio
- José Bódalo as Horcajo
- Rafaela Aparicio
- Mariano Azaña
- Juan Cortés
- Margot Cottens
- Eulália del Pino
- Beni Deus
- Adriano Domínguez
- Antonio Garisa
- Agustín González
- Rafael Hernández as Empleado gasolinera
- Fuensanta Lorente
- Rafael López Somoza
- Jesús Morris
- Paco Morán
- Adrián Ortega
- Erasmo Pascual as Guardacoches
- Encarna Paso
- Francisco Piquer
- Gustavo Re
- José Riesgo
- Pablo Sanz
- Salvador Soler Marí
- José María Tasso
- Valentín Tornos

== Production ==
The film is a Tarfe and AS production, and it was scored by Juan Quintero. Shooting locations included Madrid.

== Release ==
The film premiered at the Madrid's Cine Capitol on 30 August 1962.

== Reception ==
Bernard P. E Bentley deemed the film to be "a showcase for its large cast". In the view of Jordi Costa, it is one of the Spanish cinema's great jewels to be discovered. Joaquín de Luna considered the film to be a "little-known" instance of Hispanic costumbrismo featuring the "refreshing" intervention of Gracita Morales. According to Jordi Batlle Caminal the film belongs to the "insubstantial" subset of films within Sáenz de Heredia's filmography.

It won a film prize.

== See also ==
- List of Spanish films of 1962
- Parable of the Mustard Seed

== Bibliography ==
- Bentley, Bernard. A Companion to Spanish Cinema. Boydell & Brewer 2008.
