= José María Caffarel =

Spanish actor (1919–1999)

- Born: José María Caffarel Fábregas; 10 November 1919; Barcelona, Spain
- Died: 6 November 1999 (aged 79); Madrid, Spain
- Occupation: Actor
- Years active: 1957–1998

José María Caffarel Fábregas (10 November 1919 – 6 November 1999) was a Spanish film actor. He appeared in more than 170 films between 1957 and 1998. He was born in Barcelona and died in Madrid, Spain.

== Selected filmography ==
- The Last Torch Song (1957) - Monsieur Dupois - Empresario de París
- La cárcel de cristal (1957) - Médico
- Fulano y Mengano (1957) - Señor que da limosnas (uncredited)
- Historias de la feria (1958) - Sr. Bosch
- Distrito quinto (1958) - Cómplice - falso policía
- Giovane canaglia (1958)
- Ana dice sí (1958) - M. Holloway
- La muralla (1958) - Banquero
- El frente infinito (1959) - Médico
- Buen viaje, Pablo (1959) - Fuentes
- Muerte al amanecer (1959) - Costa
- The Crossroads (1959) - Martínez
- Crimen para recién casados (1960) - Comisario
- The Big Show (1960) - Valera
- Llama un tal Esteban (1960) - Inspector
- Tu marido nos engaña (1960)
- Gaudí (1960) - Vizconde Güell
- El emigrante (1960) - Governador
- El indulto (1960) - Defensor
- Los abanderados de la Providencia (1960)
- Anchor Button (1961) - Segundo Comandante
- Green Harvest (1961)
- Hay alguien detrás de la puerta (1961) - Dr. Vegas
- Conqueror of Maracaibo (1961) - Pirat
- Las estrellas (1961) - Sr. Rebollo
- Los cuervos (1961) - Miembro del consejo
- Plácido (1961) - Zapater
- El amor empieza en sábado (1961) - Doctor
- Tres de la Cruz Roja (1961) - (uncredited)
- Los pedigüeños (1961) - Hombre de la carretera
- Mi adorable esclava (1962) - Director del banco
- Teresa de Jesús (1962) - Obispo de Ávila
- Tómbola (1962) - Don Matías, el comisario
- Han matado a un cadáver (1962) - Señor Evans
- The Son of Captain Blood (1962) - Gov. Dawson
- The Carpet of Horror (1962) - Vane
- Detective con faldas (1962) - Comisario Dupuy
- Accidente 703 (1962) - Hipólito
- The Gang of Eight (1962)
- The Lovely Lola (1962) - Empresario
- Vuelve San Valentín (1962) - Don Lucio
- Atraco a las tres (1962) - Director General
- Hypnosis (1962) - Psychiatrist
- La gran familia (1962) - Vecino de la TV
- Rogelia (1962) - Director del penal
- Operación Embajada (1963) - Rómulo Galindo
- The Castilian (1963) - Moro principal
- Rocío from La Mancha (1963) - Don Zacarías
- La casta Susana (1963) - Alcade (uncredited)
- The Blackmailers (1963)
- Carta a una mujer (1963) - Rafael
- Ensayo general para la muerte (1963) - Director
- Marisol rumbo a Río (1963) - Empleado de Banca
- Piedra de toque (1963) - Lino Salazar
- The Secret of the Black Widow (1963) - Cartwright
- Pacto de silencio (1963) - Matías Lecumberri
- Benigno, hermano mío (1963)
- Crucero de verano (1964) - Dueño del tablao Andalucía
- Circus World (1964) - Barcelona's Mayor
- Backfire (1964) - (uncredited)
- Alféreces provisionales (1964) - Comandante (uncredited)
- Stop at Tenerife (1964) - Comisario
- El salario del crimen (1964) - Director del Banco
- El señor de La Salle (1964) - Rogier
- Dulcinea del Toboso (1964)
- El puente de la ilusión (1965)
- Flor salvaje (1965)
- La extranjera (1965)
- Television Stories (1965) - Directivo de Relojes Radiant (1)
- Más bonita que ninguna (1965) - Señor en fiesta
- Savage Pampas (1965) - Vigo
- El mundo sigue (1965) - Julito
- Marie-Chantal contre le docteur Kha (1965)
- Wild Kurdistan (1965)
- Our Agent Tiger (1965) - Col. Pontarlier
- Operation Double Cross (1965) - Technicien de la police
- Doctor Zhivago (1965) - Militiaman (uncredited)
- Suena el clarín (1965)
- Red Roses for Angelica (1966) - Louis XVI
- Monnaie de singe (1966)
- Lightning Bolt (1966) - Archie White / Rehte's Manager
- Lost Command (1966) - Minor Role (uncredited)
- Algunas lecciones de amor (1966) - Padre de Juan
- Acompáñame (1966) - Profesor
- Dynamite Jim (1966)
- Our Man in Casablanca (1966) - Ali Ahmed
- The Sea Pirate (1966) - Blaise, le père de Marie-Catherine
- The Lost Woman (1966) - Deputado #1
- Il grande colpo di Surcouf (1966) - Blaise, le père de Marie-Catherine
- El aventurero de Guaynas (1966)
- Espi... ando (1966)
- Mexican Slayride (1967) - Langis
- Las 4 bodas de Marisol (1967) - Dueño del restaurante
- El rostro del asesino (1967) - Romano
- Rattler Kid (1967) - Martin Anderson
- Lo que cuesta vivir... (1967) - Sr. Társilo
- Pero... ¿en qué país vivimos? (1967) - Sr. Gonzálvez
- Bang Bang Kid (1967) - Mayor Skaggel
- El hueso (1967) - Don Enrique
- Yo no soy un asesino (1988)
- Ragan (1968) - 'Uncle' Borrell
- Madigan's Millions (1968)
- Eve (1968) - José
- Cristina Guzmán (1968) - Dr. Montero
- Prisionero en la ciudad (1969) - Comisario Hernández
- Tristana (1970) - Don Zenón
- En un lugar de La Manga (1970) - Presidente
- Una señora llamada Andrés (1970) - Médico
- The Tigers of Mompracem (1970) - Maharaja Varauni
- Nights and Loves of Don Juan (1971) - (uncredited)
- Un aller simple (1971) - (uncredited)
- Si estás muerto, ¿por qué bailas? (1971) - Policía (voice, uncredited)
- Boulevard du Rhum (1971) - Le notaire
- Kill! Kill! Kill! Kill! (1971) - Algate
- The Legend of Frenchie King (1971) - (uncredited)
- Alta tensión (1972)
- Cerco de terror (1972)
- The Hunted (1972) - Hugh
- Le complot (1973) - (uncredited)
- Ricco the Mean Machine (1973) - The Marsigliese
- Las señoritas de mala compañía (1973) - Jaime Roig Vidal
- Separación matrimonial (1973) - Don Anselmo
- Proceso a Jesús (1974) - Interprete de Poncio Pilatos
- ¿... Y el prójimo? (1974)
- La femme aux bottes rouges (1974) - (uncredited)
- The Passenger (1975) - Hotel Keeper (uncredited)
- Una abuelita de antes de la guerra (1975) - Profesor
- Breakout (1975) - Prison Doctor (uncredited)
- Order to Kill (1975) - Richard
- Leonor (1975) - Doctor
- Bride to Be (1975) - Deán
- Tío, ¿de verdad vienen de París? (1977) - Comisario de policía
- Viaje al centro de la Tierra (1977) - Professor Fridleson
- Uno del millón de muertos (1977)
- Tengamos la guerra en paz (1977) - Carmelo
- Luto riguroso (1977) - Notario
- Stay as You Are (1978) - Bartolo
- Una familia decente (1978) - Presidente
- L'ingorgo (1979)
- Supersonic Man (1979) - Prof. Morgan / Gordon
- Polvos mágicos (1979) - Conde
- Mis relaciones con Ana (1979) - D. Alejandro
- Estigma (1980) - Taxista / taxi driver
- El lobo negro (1981)
- Gay Club (1981) - Herminio
- Puente aéreo (1981) - Momplet
- Duelo a muerte (1981) - Diego
- Jeremy (Concierto para dos) (1982)
- Memorias del general Escobar (1984) - Manuel Azaña
- Mon ami Washington (1984)
- Professor Poopsnagle's Steam Zeppelin (1985) - Doctor García
- Dragon Rapide (1986) - Comisario Policía
- El viaje a ninguna parte (1986) - Director de cine
- Jarrapellejos (1988) - Juez
- Al Andalus (1989)
- Pasión de hombre (1989) - Don Jesus
- Fine Gold (1989) - Don Sebastián
- Blood and Sand (1989) - Mayor
- There Was a Castle with Forty Dogs (1990) - Le notaire
- The Rogue Stallion (1990, TV Movie) - Gonzales
- Solo o en compañía de otros (1991) - Prosecutor
- Ho sap el ministre? (1991) - Josep Fils
- Dyningar (1991) - Editor Corrales
- El beso del sueño (1992) - El Cura
- Niño nadie (1997) - Don Faustino
- Licántropo (1997) - Dr. Jeremy Westenra
- Todas hieren (1998) - Finsterlin
