= Television Stories =

- Directed by: José Luis Sáenz de Heredia
- Written by: Vicente Coello; Pedro Masó; José Luis Sáenz de Heredia
- Produced by: Pedro Masó
- Cinematography: Juan Mariné
- Edited by: Antonio Ramírez de Loaysa
- Music by: Augusto Algueró
- Production companies: Hesperia Films; Pedro Masó Producciones Cinematográficas
- Distributed by: Filmayer
- Release date: 3 May 1965
- Running time: 114 minutes
- Country: Spain
- Language: Spanish

Television Stories (Spanish:Historias de la televisión) is a 1965 Spanish comedy film directed by José Luis Sáenz de Heredia and starring Concha Velasco, Tony Leblanc and José Luis López Vázquez. It updated the basic plot of the 1955 film Radio Stories by the same director.

== Partial cast ==
- Concha Velasco as Katy (2)
- Tony Leblanc as Felipe Carrasco
- José Luis López Vázquez as Eladio (1)
- Antonio Garisa as Don Marcelino (1,2)
- Alfredo Landa as Antonio Parrondo y Carnicero, novio de Katy (2)
- José Calvo as Ramón Valladares
- José Alfayate as Faustino Carrasco
- Manuel Alexandre as Técnico de TV (1)
- José Luis Coll as Afrodisio Rincón, participante en concurso de TV (1)
- Paco Morán as Agustín Cañizo, concursante escayolado (1)
- Luchy Soto as Monja #2
- Rafaela Aparicio as Criada de Don Marcelino (1)
- Gracita Morales as Esposa embarazada de Eladio (1)
- Guadalupe Muñoz Sampedro as Suegra de Eladio (1)
- Margot Cottens as Monja recepcionista del hospital #1
- Erasmo Pascual as Limpiabotas
- Jesús Guzmán as Percusionista
- José María Caffarel as Directivo de Relojes Radiant (1)

== Bibliography ==
- Bentley, Bernard. A Companion to Spanish Cinema. Boydell & Brewer 2008.
