= Jesús Puente =

Spanish actor (1930–2000)

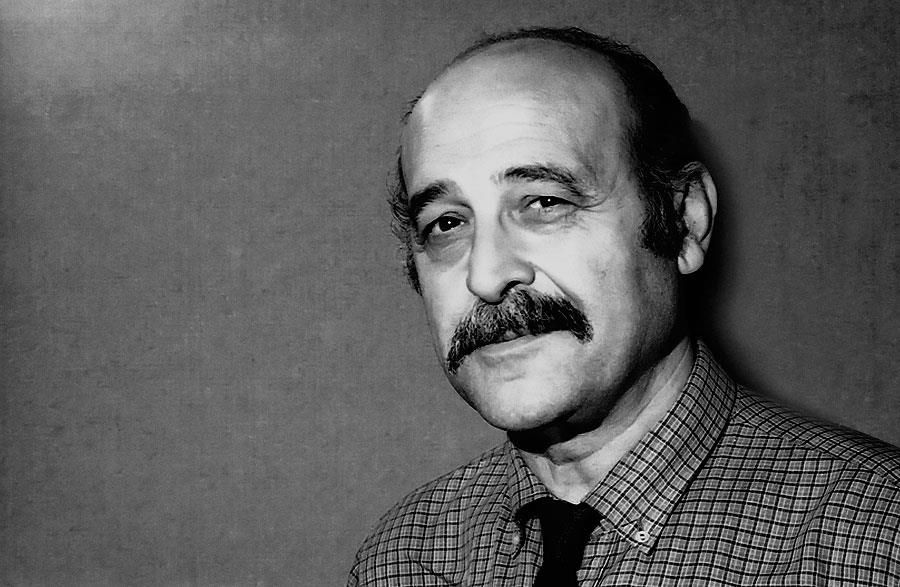
- Puente in 1984
- Born: Jesús Puente Alzaga; 18 December 1930; Madrid, Spain
- Died: 26 October 2000 (aged 69); Madrid, Spain
- Occupation: Actor
- Years active: 1957–2000

Jesús Puente Alzaga (18 December 1930 – 26 October 2000) was a Spanish actor. He appeared in more than one hundred films from 1957 to 2000.

In 1954 he represented The Taming of the Shrew of William Shakespeare at the Teatre Grec.

== Selected filmography ==
- 1957: El hombre que viajaba despacito - Sargento instructor
- 1957: Las muchachas de azul - Don César
- 1958: Historias de Madrid - Cliente de la futuróloga
- 1958: El hereje
- 1958: The Christ of the Lanterns - Amigo de Antonio
- 1958: Red Cross Girls - Jugador en hipódromo
- 1959: Gayarre - Elorrio
- 1959: Ten Ready Rifles - Alguacil en Consejo de Guerra
- 1959: Bombas para la paz - Mr. Thompson, delegado estadounidense
- 1959: Los tramposos
- 1959: The Last Days of Pompeii - Roman Senator
- 1960: La fiel infantería - Cabo Silvestre
- 1960: Carnival Day - Locutor
- 1960: El indulto - Vigilante de patio
- 1960: La paz empieza nunca - Mencia
- 1960: Los económicamente débiles - Examinador Escuela de Entrenadores
- 1960: Trío de damas - Juan
- 1961: Usted puede ser un asesino - Ayudante de Comisario Serbel
- 1961: Ha llegado un ángel - Director
- 1961: Tres de la Cruz Roja - Capitán Martín
- 1961: Diferente - Christmas guest
- 1962: Teresa de Jesús - Corregidor
- 1962: Aprendiendo a morir - Marcos
- 1962: Accident 703 - Guardia Civil de tráfico
- 1962: Sabían demasiado - Don Cipriano, el comisario
- 1962: Escuela de seductoras - Marido de Milagros
- 1962: I tromboni di Fra Diavolo
- 1963: Rocío from La Mancha - Carlos
- 1963: Los conquistadores del Pacífico - Francisco Pizarro
- 1963: Eva 63 - Fernando
- 1964: Ella y el miedo - Conductor
- 1964: Apache Fury - Juez Todd Driscoll
- 1964: Cyrano and d'Artagnan - (uncredited)
- 1964: The Seven from Texas - Clifford
- 1964: Fin de semana - Miguel
- 1964: Damned Pistols of Dallas
- 1964: La hora incógnita - Marido de María
- 1965: Loca juventud - (uncredited)
- 1965: Per un pugno nell'occhio - Capitan Hernandez
- 1965: Más bonita que ninguna - Novio de Fany
- 1965: Behind the Mask of Zorro - Gobernador Alfonso de la Riva
- 1965: Ocaso de un pistolero - Sheriff Roger
- 1965: Adiós gringo - Sheriff Saul Slaughter
- 1966: Due mafiosi contro Al Capone - Tony
- 1966: Dollars for a Fast Gun - Frank Nolan
- 1966: Ypotron - Final Countdown - Wilson
- 1966: Un gangster venuto da Brooklyn
- 1967: Two Crosses at Danger Pass - Sheriff T. Mitchell
- 1967: The Cobra - Stiarkos
- 1967: The Million Dollar Countdown - Talbol
- 1967: Un hombre vino a matar - Alex Turner
- 1967: Bandidos
- 1968: Ringo the Lone Rider - Major Corbett
- 1968: Persecución hasta Valencia - Mohamed el Chulakei
- 1969: A Bullet for Rommel - Col. Wolf
- 1969: Tarzán en la gruta del oro - Julius
- 1969: One on Top of the Other - Sergeant Rodriguez
- 1969: A 45 revoluciones por minuto - Sr. Aranda
- 1969: El regreso de Al Capone - Al Capone
- 1970: Count Dracula - Minister of Interior (uncredited)
- 1970: Verano 70 - Dr. Valverde 'Paco'
- 1970: Por qué pecamos a los cuarenta - Luis
- 1970: Hatchet for the Honeymoon - Inspector Russell
- 1970: El mejor del mundo
- 1970: Crimen imperfecto - Comisario Montero
- 1970: El dinero tiene miedo - Sabastián - el mayordomo
- 1971: Marta - Don Carlos
- 1977: Obsesión - Ignacio
- 1979: El fascista, la beata y su hija desvirgada - Doctor (uncredited)
- 1979: Mi adúltero esposo ('In Situ') - Juan
- 1980: Despido improcedente - Andrés
- 1983: La avispita Ruinasa - Luis Viveos
- 1984: Gritos de ansiedad - Ángel
- 1984: Sesión continua - Federico Alcántara
- 1984: Memorias del general Escobar - General Rojo
- 1984: Violines y trompetas - Gabriel
- 1986: El orden cómico - Don Antonio López Terrón
- 1986: Romanza final - Doctor
- 1986: Los presuntos - Alejo
- 1986: Capullito de alhelí - Hilario
- 1987: La estanquera de Vallecas - Comisario Paíno
- 1987: Asignatura aprobada - José Manuel Alcántara
- 1987: Terroristas - Vargas
- 1987: Veredicto implacable - Inspector
- 1988: Caminos de tiza
- 1996: Eso - Realizador
- 2000: You're the One - Dr. Bermann (final film role)

== Theatre director ==
- 1988: Entre mujeres
- 1989: Los ochenta son nuestros
