= Josep Palau i Fabre =

Spanish Catalan poet and writer (1917–2008)

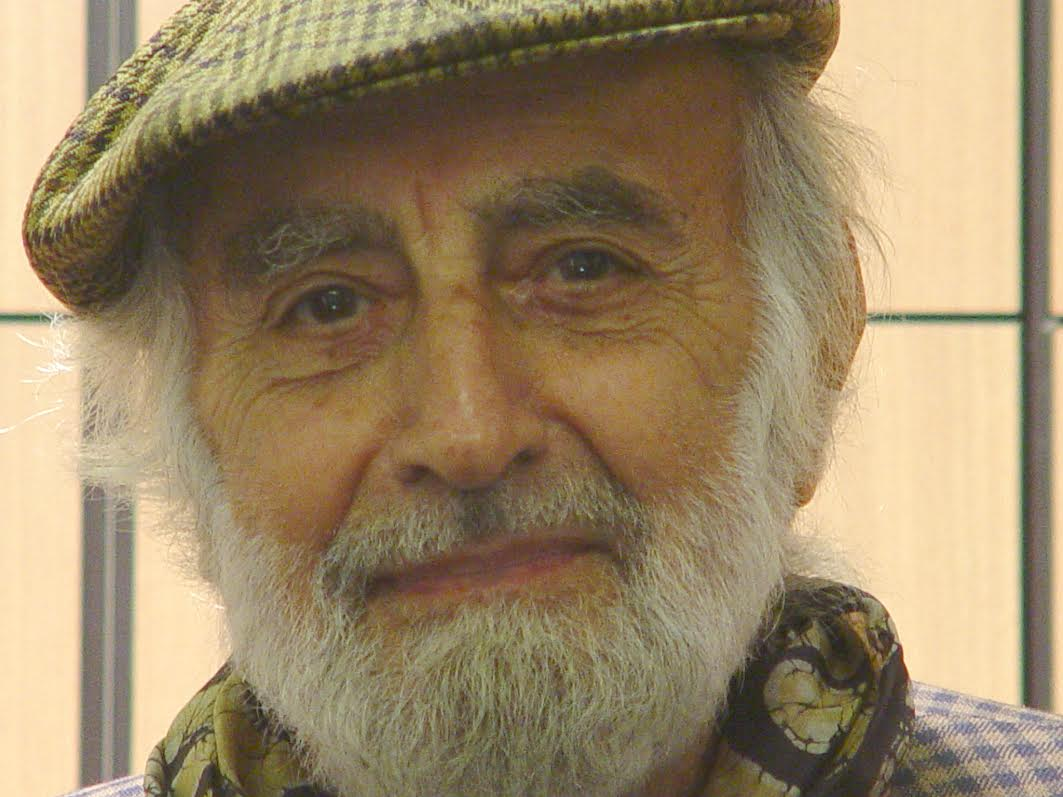
Josep Palau i Fabre

Josep Palau i Fabre (born 21 April 1917 in Barcelona; died in the same city on 23 February 2008) was a Spanish Catalan poet and writer. He was a representative of Catalan literature during the post-World War period and a world expert on the work of Pablo Picasso.

== Biography ==
The son of a painter and decorator, towards the end of the 1930s Fabre began his literary career by writing poetry. He studied arts at the University of Barcelona, and, during the 1950s, he was an active collaborator in various literary magazines such as Poesia and Ariel as well as being an editor at the La serena publishing house. A scholarship from the French government drew Fabre to Paris in 1945. Afterward, he revoked his Spanish citizenship so that he could be classified as a political refugee.

In addition to poetry, he wrote plays, short stories and essays, including on Picasso. His fictional world draws on eroticism, showing strong dimensions other than those of the standard idea of reality and harshly criticising the idea of a self-satisfied, mediocre society. Fabre was also an active translator, translating into Catalan works by Antonin Artaud, Arthur Rimbaud, Honoré de Balzac, and the book Letters of a Portuguese Nun. His own books have been translated into several languages.Fabre was also an active translator, translating into Catalan works by Antonin Artaud, Arthur Rimbaud, Honoré de Balzac, and Letters of a Portuguese Nun. His own works have been translated into several languages.

Fabre died at the Hospital de la Vall d'Hebron in Barcelona aged 90 years and was buried in the municipal cemetery in Caldes d'Estrac.

== Work ==
=== Poetry ===
- 1942 : Balades amargues
- 1943 : L'aprenent del poeta
- 1945 : Imitació de Rosselló-Pòrcel
- 1946 : Càncer
- 1952 : Poemes de l'alquimista (reissued in 1977, 1979, 1991 and 2002, the last a bilingual Catalan/Spanish edition)
- 2001 : Les veus del ventríloc: poesia de teatre

=== Novels ===
- 1983 : Contes despullats
- 1984 : La tesi doctoral del diable
- 1988 : Amb noms de dona
- 1991 : Un Saló que camina
- 1993 : L'Alfa Romeo i Julieta i altres contes
- 1993 : Contes de capçalera
- 1996 : Les metamorfosis d'Ovídia i altres contes

=== Plays ===
- 1957 : Esquelet de Don Joan
- 1972 : Homenatge a Picasso
- 1977 : Teatre
- 1978 : La tràgica història de Miquel Kolhas
- 1986 : Avui Romeo i Julieta. El porter i el penalty
- 1991 : L'Alfa Romeo i Julieta, i altres contes, precedit per Aparició de Faust
- 2000 : La confessió o l'esca del pecat
- 2003 : Teatre de Don Joan

=== Essays and literary criticism ===
- 1943 : Pensaments
- 1961 : La tragèdia o el llenguatge de la llibertat
- 1962 : El mirall embruixat
- 1962 : Vides de Picasso
- 1962 : Vides de Picasso: assaig de biografia
- 1963 : Picasso
- 1964 : Doble assaig sobre Picasso
- 1966 : Picasso a Catalunya
- 1970 : Picasso per Picasso
- 1971 : L'extraordinària vida de Picasso
- 1971 : Picasso i els seus amics catalans
- 1976 : Antonin Artaud i la revolta del teatre modern
- 1976 : Quaderns de l'alquimista
- 1977 : Pare Picasso
- 1979 : El « Gernika » de Picasso
- 1981 : El secret de les Menines de Picasso
- 1981 : Picasso
- 1981 : Picasso vivent, 1881-1907
- 1981 : Picasso, Barcelona, Catalunya (with Montserrat Blanch, Alexandre Cirici and Isabel Coll)
- 1981 : Picasso a l'abast
- 1983 : Nous quaderns de l'alquimista
- 1990 : Picasso cubisme, 1907-1917
- 1991 : Quaderns inèdits de l'alquimista
- 1996 : Lorca-Picasso
- 1996 : Quaderns de vella i nova alquímia
- 1997 : Quaderns de l'alquimista
- 1997 : Estimat Picasso
- 1999 : Picasso dels ballets al drama, 1917-1926
- 2004 : Problemàtica de la tragèdia a Catalunya: obertura del curs acadèmic, 2003-2004
