= The Big Show (1960 film) =

1960 film

- Directed by: Francisco Rovira Beleta
- Written by: Manuel María Saló
- Produced by: Enrique Esteban; Germán Lorente
- Starring: Christian Marquand; Agnès Laurent; Ángel Aranda
- Cinematography: Mario Pacheco
- Edited by: María Rosa Ester
- Music by: José Solá
- Production companies: C.B. Films; Este Films; Jad Films
- Distributed by: C.B. Films
- Release date: 20 May 1960
- Running time: 90 minutes
- Countries: France; Spain
- Language: Spanish

The Big Show (Spanish: Altas variedades) is a 1960 French-Spanish drama film directed by Francisco Rovira Beleta and starring Christian Marquand, Agnès Laurent and Ángel Aranda.

== Cast ==
- Christian Marquand as Walter
- Agnès Laurent as Ilona
- Ángel Aranda as Rudolf
- Vicky Lagos as Rosita
- Marisa de Leza as Rita
- José María Caffarel as Valera
- Mari Carmen Yepes
- Luis Induni as Representante del Circo Austriaco
- Mario Bustos
- Jesús Puche
- Camino Delgado
- Ventura Oller as Amigo de Walter
- Fernando Rubio as Amigo de Walter
- Ramón Quadreny
- Manuel Bronchud as Amigo de Walter
- Antonia Manau
- Carmen Correa
- Gaspar 'Indio' González
- Francisco Bernal
- María Fernanda Ladrón de Guevara as Doña Mercedes
- Julia Martinez

== Bibliography ==
- de España, Rafael. Directory of Spanish and Portuguese film-makers and films. Greenwood Press, 1994.
