= Margot Cottens =

Uruguayan actress (1922–1999)

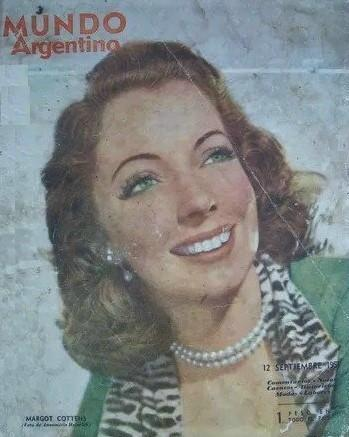
- Born: Margot Noemí Cottens Costa; 9 January 1922; Montevideo, Uruguay
- Died: 2 January 1999 (aged 76); Madrid, Spain
- Occupation: Actress

Margot Noemí Cottens Costa (January 9, 1922 – January 2, 1999) was an Uruguayan actress who made most of her career in Spain.

== Filmography ==
| Year | Title | Role | Notes |
|---|---|---|---|
| 1951 | La pícara cenicienta | | |
| 1952 | Dark River | | |
| 1953 | The Count of Monte Cristo | | |
| 1961 | My Love Is Called Margarita | Madre de Margarita (narrator) | |
| 1962 | Mi adorable esclava | Clarita | |
| 1962 | Canción de Juventud | Monja | |
| 1962 | The Mustard Grain | | Uncredited |
| 1963 | Los derechos de la mujer | La cónyuge | |
| 1963 | La pandilla de los once | La Condesa | |
| 1963 | El diablo también llora | Julia | |
| 1964 | Crucero de verano | Margot | |
| 1964 | Fuera de la ley | Sra. Pryce | |
| 1964 | El salario del crimen | Clienta de Elsa | |
| 1965 | Jandro | Miss Bennet | |
| 1965 | Television Stories | Monja recepcionista del hospital #1 | |
| 1965 | El tímido | | |
| 1965 | La familia y... uno más | Consuelo Aguilar | |
| 1966 | La ciudad no es para mí | Geno | |
| 1966 | El arte de no casarse | Madre de Alfonsito (1) | |
| 1966 | Las viudas | Amiga de Paula | (segment "El Retrato de Regino") |
| 1967 | Sor Citroën | La Trini | |
| 1967 | Amor a la española | Extranjera en la fiesta de Marjory | |
| 1967 | I'll Kill Him and Return Alone | Mrs. Huerte | |
| 1967 | ¿Qué hacemos con los hijos? | Falsa embarazada | |
| 1967 | Los chicos del Preu | Madre de Lolo | |
| 1967 | Las que tienen que servir | Mrs. Meg Stevens | |
| 1967 | Novios 68 | Señora a la que sirve Lucia | |
| 1967 | A Nun at the Crossroads | Madeleine | |
| 1968 | Escuela de enfermeras | Madre superiora | |
| 1968 | El turismo es un gran invento | Remedios | |
| 1968 | Sor Ye Ye | Tía de María | |
| 1968 | Operation Mata Hari | Agripina | |
| 1968 | ¡Cómo está el servicio! | Consuelo, esposa del Dr. Mariano Cifuentes | |
| 1968 | Los que tocan el piano | Juliana, esposa de Don Tadeo | |
| 1968 | Cuidado con las señoras | Nati | |
| 1968 | Long-Play | Sor Catalina de los Desamparados | |
| 1969 | La que arman las mujeres | Carmela | |
| 1969 | Las nenas del mini-mini | Baronesa | |
| 1969 | A 45 revoluciones por minuto | Florinda | |
| 1970 | El alma se serena | Eulalia | |
| 1970 | El abominable hombre de la Costa del Sol | Mrs. Bell | |
| 1970 | El mesón del gitano | Andrea | |
| 1970 | Cateto a babor | Tía Enriqueta | |
| 1970 | Dele color al difunto | Madame Venancia | |
| 1970 | No desearás al vecino del quinto | La madre de Jacinta | |
| 1971 | La casa de los Martínez | Amiga de Olga | |
| 1971 | Grazie zio, ci provo anch'io | Lola | |
| 1971 | Las ibéricas F.C. | Doña Josefa Moncayo | |
| 1971 | Blanca por fuera y Rosa por dentro | Doña Úrsula 'Tita', tía de Camilo | |
| 1971 | Los días de Cabirio | Tío | |
| 1974 | ¿... Y el prójimo? | Teresa | |
| 1974 | Un hombre como los demás | | |
| 1975 | Divorcio a la andaluza | | |
| 1977 | El hombre que mató a Billy el Niño | | |
| 1978 | ¡Vaya par de gemelos! | Julia | |
| 1979 | Saturday, Sunday and Friday | Enza's mother | (segment "Domenica") |
| 1979 | La familia, bien, gracias | Consuelo | |
| 1981 | Es peligroso casarse a los 60 | Tina, la madre de Javier | |
