= Trini Alonso =

Spanish actress

- Born: 27 June 1923; Santander, Spain
- Died: 20 January 2000 (aged 76); Madrid
- Other name: Trinidad Alonso Fernández
- Occupation: Actress
- Years active: 1953-1988 (film)

Trini Alonso (1923–2000) was a Spanish film actress.

She died in Madrid in 2020.

== Selected filmography ==
- Spanish Fantasy (1953)
- Maribel and the Strange Family (1960)
- You Have the Eyes of a Deadly Woman (1962)
- Tomy's Secret (1963)
- Stop at Tenerife (1964)
- Dos chicas locas, locas (1964)
- Weekend, Italian Style (1966)
- The Wild Ones of San Gil Bridge (1966)
- Variety (1971)

== Bibliography ==
- Peter Cowie & Derek Elley. World Filmography: 1967. Fairleigh Dickinson University Press, 1977.
