= Red Roses for Angelica =

1966 film

- Directed by: Steno
- Written by: Steno; Leo Cevenini; Marcello Ciorciolini; Antonio Cuevas; Roberto Gianviti; Natividad Zaro
- Starring: Jacques Perrin; Raffaella Carrà
- Cinematography: Mario Capriotti
- Edited by: Giuliana Attenni
- Music by: Angelo Francesco Lavagnino
- Release date: 1966
- Language: Italian

Red Roses for Angelica (Italian: Rose rosse per Angelica, French: Le Chevalier à la rose rouge, Spanish: El aventurero de la rosa roja) is a 1966 adventure film co-written and directed by Steno. A co-production between Italy, France and Spain, it is loosely based on the novel Le Chevalier de Maison-Rouge by Alexandre Dumas.

== Cast ==
- Jacques Perrin as Henri de Verlaine
- Raffaella Carrà as Angélique
- Carlos Estrada as Baron François La Flèche
- Michèle Girardon as Antoinette La Flèche
- Cris Huerta as Paul
- Jacques Castelot as Count d'Artois
- Marta Padovan as Louise
- Giulio Bosetti as the Marseillais
- José María Caffarel as Louis XVI
- Mario Feliciani as Dr. Durand
- Enrique Navarro as Marquis Lalume
- Sandro Moretti as Rambouillet
- Renato Chiantoni as the Prison Director
- Ángel Álvarez
