= La gran familia =

- Spanish film poster by Mac
- Directed by: Fernando Palacios
- Written by: Rafael J. Salvia; Pedro Masó; Antonio Vich
- Produced by: Pedro Masó
- Starring: Alberto Closas; Amparo Soler Leal; José Isbert; José Luis López Vázquez
- Cinematography: Víctor Benítez; Juan Mariné
- Edited by: Pedro del Rey
- Music by: Adolfo Waitzman
- Release date: 20 December 1962
- Running time: 104 minutes
- Country: Spain
- Language: Spanish

La gran familia is a 1962 Spanish classic comedy film directed by Fernando Palacios and starring Alberto Closas and Amparo Soler Leal, as a married couple with 15 children, José Isbert and José Luis López Vázquez.

It was so successful that it inspired two film sequels, La familia y uno más in 1965 and La familia bien, gracias in 1979 and a Antena 3 TV movie, La gran familia... 30 años después in 1999.

== Plot ==
Carlos (Alberto Closas) has to work to feed his wife (Amparo Soler Leal), his 15 children and the grandpa (José Isbert). The children dream of having a television. The summer holidays is another trouble for the big family.

== Cast ==
- Alberto Closas as Carlos Alonso
- Amparo Soler Leal as Mercedes Cebrián
- José Isbert as the grandfather
- José Luis López Vázquez as the godfather
- María José Alfonso
- Jaime Blanch
- Pedro Mari Sánchez
- Maribel Martín
- Paco Valladares
- Julia Gutiérrez Caba
- María Isbert
- Jesús Álvarez
- Luis Barbero
- Jesús Guzmán
- Pedro Sempson
- Valentín Tornos
- Félix Acaso
- José María Caffarel
- Laly Soldevila
- José María Prada
- Luis Morris
