= Katia Loritz =

- Born: Margrith Anna Loritz; 4 November 1932; St. Gallen, Switzerland
- Died: 16 August 2015 (aged 82); Madrid, Spain
- Occupations: Actress, artist

Katia Loritz (4 November 1932 – 16 August 2015), born Margrith Anna Loritz, was a Swiss-born Spanish-based actress.

== Biography ==
Loritz was born in St. Gallen, Switzerland. After her primary studies in her home town, she moved to Munich, where she studied dramatic arts. She moved to Spain in the mid-1950s and soon after started her Spanish movie career with the film, Las manos sucias (1957) With her next movie Las chicas de la Cruz Roja (1958) by Rafael J. Salvia, which was successful at the box-office.

She also painted and in her later years exhibited her work professionally.

Loritz died in Madrid on 16 August 2015 due to lung cancer.

== Filmography ==
- Las manos sucias (1957), Teresa
- Las chicas de la Cruz Roja (1958), Marion
- Mi calle (1960), Carmela
- Litri and His Shadow (1960)
- The Prince in Chains (1960)
- Kill and Be Killed (1962)
- You and Me Are Three (1962)
- Atraco a las tres (1962), Katia Durán
- What Have I Done to Deserve This? (1984), Ingrid Muller
