= Mary Had a Little... =

1961 British film by Edward Buzzell

- Directed by: Edward Buzzell
- Written by: Robert E. Kent; Jameson Brewer; Peter Miller; James Kelly
- Produced by: George Fowler; Edward Small (executive)
- Starring: Agnes Laurent; Hazel Court; Jack Watling
- Cinematography: Desmond Dickinson
- Edited by: Bernard Gribble
- Music by: Bruce Campbell
- Production company: Caralan Productions
- Distributed by: United Artists; Lopert Pictures (US)
- Release date: September 1961 (UK)
- Running time: 82 minutes
- Country: United Kingdom
- Language: English

Mary Had a Little... is a 1961 British comedy film directed by Edward Buzzell and starring Agnès Laurent, Hazel Court and Jack Watling. It takes its title from the nursery rhyme Mary Had a Little Lamb and is about a slick impresario who tries unsuccessfully to win a bet with a psychiatrist over the production of a perfect baby via hypnotism.

It has been described by film historian David McGillivray as "the first full-fledged British sex comedy."

== Cast ==
- Agnès Laurent as Mary Kirk
- Hazel Court as Laurel Clive
- Jack Watling as Scott Raymond
- John Bentley as Dr Malcolm Nettel
- Michael Ward as Hunter
- Clifford Mollison as Watkins
- John Maxim as Burley Shavely
- Terry Scott as police sergeant
- Sidney Vivian as Grimmick
- Patricia Marmont as Angie
- Rose Alba as Duchess of Addlecombe
- Noel Howlett as Pottle
- Trevor Reid as Dr Liversidge
- Frances Bennett as Esther
- John Cazabon as Fitchett
- Charles Saynor as taxi driver
- Mark Hardy as Hawkes
- Michael Madden as Tigg
- Vincent Harding as Carney
- Tony Thawnton as Shakespeare

== Production ==
The film was the first of a three-picture deal between director Edward Buzzell and producer Edward Small; the other two films were never shot. The screenplay was based on the play of the same name by Arthur Herzog Jr., Muriel Herman and Al Rosen, which had its West End opening at the Strand Theatre on 27 November 1951 in a production directed by Ralph Lynn.

Production took place in October 1960 at Walton Studios near London under the supervision of David Rose. The theme tune, "Mary Had a Little...", was written by Buzzell and sung by Dick James. The completed film turned out to be Buzzell's final directorial assignment and also the penultimate credit for Agnès Laurent.

== Release ==
Having opened in Los Angeles on 25 July 1961, the film went into general release in the UK on 3 August.

== Critical reception ==
The Monthly Film Bulletin wrote: "Whatever the merits of the original play, the film remains, in its strenuously saucy way, on an abysmally unsubtle level."

Variety called it a "lower case farce", adding, "Pregnant idea, miscarries."
