= Maribel and the Strange Family =

- Directed by: José María Forqué
- Written by: Miguel Mihura (play); Luis Marquina; Vicente Coello; José María Forqué
- Produced by: Marciano de la Fuente
- Starring: Silvia Pinal; Adolfo Marsillach; Julia Caba Alba
- Cinematography: José F. Aguayo
- Edited by: Julio Peña
- Music by: Manuel Parada
- Production companies: Tarfe Films; As Films Producción
- Distributed by: As Films
- Release date: 10 October 1960
- Running time: 98 minutes
- Country: Spain
- Language: Spanish

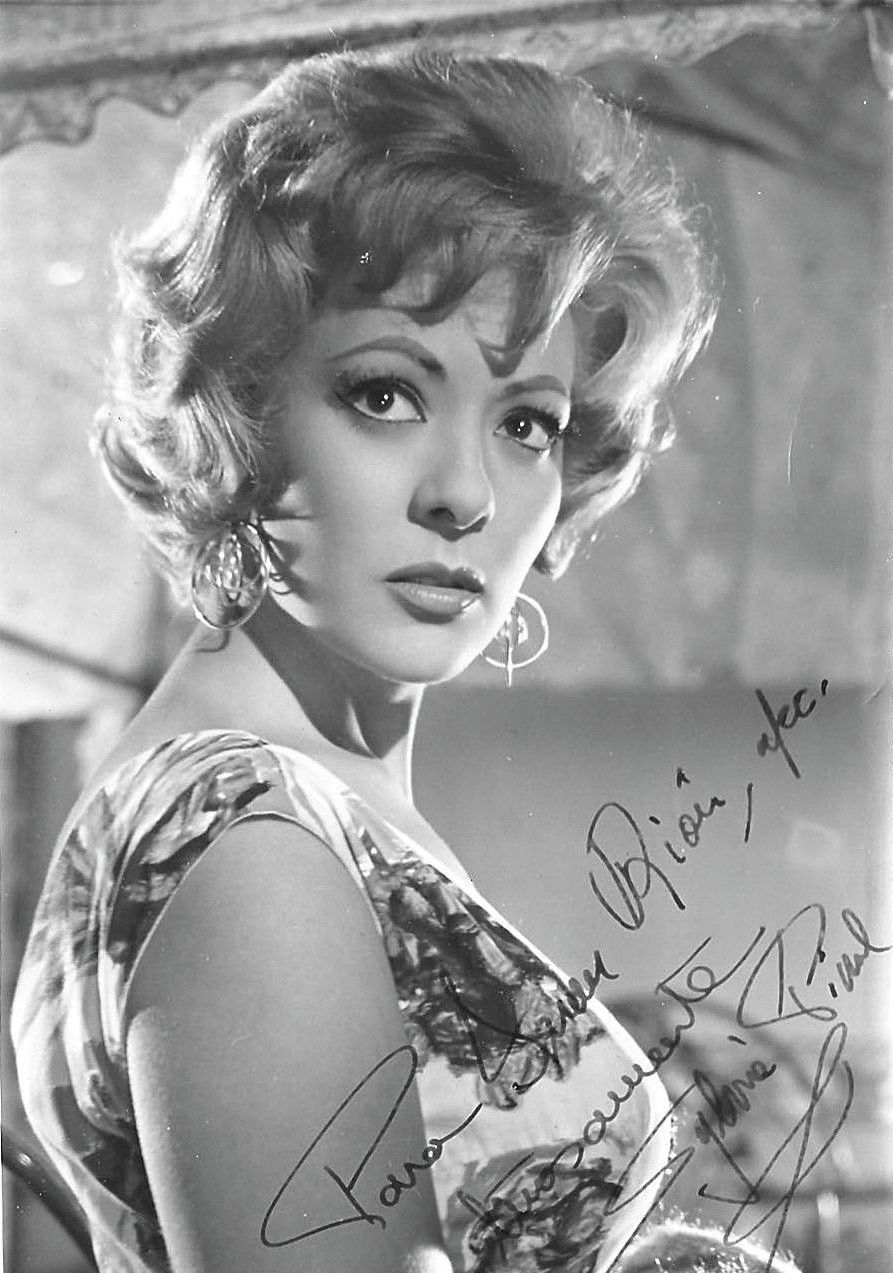
Silvia Pinal, Maribel y la extraña familia, 1960

Maribel and the Strange Family (Spanish: Maribel y la extraña familia) is a 1960 Spanish comedy film directed by José María Forqué and starring Silvia Pinal, Adolfo Marsillach and Julia Caba Alba. A widower wishes to marry an ex-prostitute, but her friends become convinced that he has murdered his first wife.

The film's sets were designed by Enrique Alarcón.

== Cast ==
- Silvia Pinal as Maribel
- Adolfo Marsillach as Marcelo
- Julia Caba Alba as Tía Paula
- Guadalupe Muñoz Sampedro as Doña Matilde
- Trini Alonso as Rufi
- Carmen Lozano as Pili
- Gracita Morales as Niní
- José Orjas as Fermín
- Erasmo Pascual as Don José
- Dolores Bremón as Doña Rosita
- Antonio Queipo as Doctor Roldán
- Pilar Muñoz as Claudia
- Alicia Hermida as Flora
- Pilar Gómez Ferrer as Petra
- Julia Pachelo as Pepa
- Enrique Echevarría as Don Fernando
- Maritsenka Domowslaski as Hija de Petra
- María Sánchez Aroca as Doña Vicenta
- Esther Rambal as Chica taller
- Pepita Otero as Camarera
- Encarna Paso as Mujer llamativa

== Bibliography ==
- Bentley, Bernard. A Companion to Spanish Cinema. Boydell & Brewer, 2008.
