= Sor Ye Ye =

- Directed by: Tito Fernández
- Starring: Hilda Aguirre; Manuel Gil; Enrique Guzmán; Sara García
- Release date: 1968
- Countries: Spain; Mexico
- Language: Spanish

Sor Ye Ye is a 1968 musical film in co-production between Spain and Mexico, directed by Tito Fernández and starring Hilda Aguirre, Manuel Gil and Enrique Guzmán. This film is loosely based on the novel La hermana San Sulpicio.

== Plot ==
María (Hilda Aguirre) is a young orphan woman who lives with her wealthy aunt (Margot Cottens). María enjoys singing in a nightclub with her friends, who have a rock band called "Los Yakis Voladores". Her friend Ernesto (Enrique Guzmán) is in love with her but she doesn't think she feels the same. In fact, her many existential questions and a strange emptiness she feels in her life suddenly compel her to enter a convent as a novice. This breaks Ernesto's heart and she isn't the best fit for a convent with her happy, open, rebellious nature. The headmistress tries to lead her in the right direction by chastising her. The convent is also a children's hospital and Maria meets a doctor (Manuel Gil) with whom she has a personality clash although they develop a mutual liking and respect.

Meanwhile, the convent is going through financial difficulties and the nuns must deny themselves food so all the children will have enough. They also need money to get a blind child an operation and to prevent the closure of the convent itself. Maria goes to her aunt to ask for a "voluntary" donation, but her aunt furiously sends her away. After asking permission from the Mother Superior and the bishop, Maria decides to compete in the Sanremo Music Festival, thinking that the first-prize purse will be enough to save the convent forever. But Ernesto will be among her competitors. Meanwhile, is she really meant to be a nun, or does she have a future with that doctor?

== Controversy ==
At the time of release, Hilda Aguirre was introduced as the film's sole star and also the vocalist for its songs. But her singing was dubbed by the then-unknown Estela Núñez, who was forbidden to reveal that she was the singer; she was also forbidden to sing the songs in public. A few years later she rose to stardom in Mexico, and Enrique Guzmán revealed in an interview that Estela Núñez was the real singer in the film.
