= Apache Fury =

1964 film

- Film poster
- Directed by: José María Elorrieta
- Produced by: Jesús Puente
- Starring: Frank Latimore; Nuria Torray
- Cinematography: Alfonso Nieva
- Music by: Fernando García Morcillo
- Release date: 1 October 1964
- Running time: 90 minutes
- Countries: Spain, Italy
- Language: Spanish

Apache Fury (Spanish: El hombre de la diligencia meaning "man of the stage", Italian: La furia degli Apache) is a 1964 Italian-Spanish Spaghetti Western directed and co-written by José María Elorrieta. It was based on a novel by Eduardo Guzman.

== Plot ==
At an isolated coaching station in the Arizona desert, Steve Loman is approached by some outlaw friends. They tell him that a stagecoach containing the corrupt Judge Driscoll, his bride to be Ruth, her young brother Jimmy and a card sharp are heading for the station with a large amount of money. As the Apaches led by Geronimo are on the warpath, it would be too easy for Loman to revenge himself on Driscoll who sent Loman to prison on a false charge that also ruined his army career and split the money with the outlaws and travel to Mexico. Loman refuses.

As the stagecoach arrives it is attacked by an Apache war party and shelters inside the station. Adding to their troubles, the young Jimmy mistakes approaching non-hostile Pima Indians for Apache killing one that sets the Pima against the whites unless they surrender Jimmy.

== Cast ==
- Frank Latimore as Major Steve Loman
- Nuria Torray as Ruth
- Jesús Puente as Judge Todd Driscoll
- Ángel Ortiz as Silas
- Germán Cobos as George Gordon
- Mariano Vidal Molina as Burt Kaplan
- Pastor Serrador as Richard 'Poker Dick'
- Jorge Martín as Elmer Roscoe
- Guillermo Vera as Juan Diego
- Julio Pérez Tabernero as Jimmy
- Aldo Sambrell as Burt henchman
- Alfonso de la Vega as Soldado
- Francisco Braña as Burt henchman
- Rufino Inglés as Banquero
- Guillermo Méndez as Capitán
- Antonio Cintado as Sargento
- José Sancho
- Yvonne Bastien
