= Spanish Fantasy =

1953 Spanish film by Javier Setó

- Directed by: Javier Setó
- Written by: Manuel Bengoa; Juan Lladó
- Starring: Antonio Casal; Ángel de Andrés; Trini Alonso
- Cinematography: Emilio Foriscot
- Edited by: Juan Pallejá
- Production company: IFI Producción
- Distributed by: IFSA
- Release date: 9 November 1953
- Running time: 93 minutes
- Country: Spain
- Language: Spanish

Spanish Fantasy (Spanish: Fantasía española) is a 1953 Spanish comedy film directed by Javier Setó and starring Antonio Casal, Ángel de Andrés and Trini Alonso.

== Cast ==
- Antonio Casal as Rafael
- Ángel de Andrés as Pepe
- Trini Alonso as Choli
- Paco Martínez Soria as Suave
- Carmen de Ronda as Virginia
- Carlos Otero as Jim
- Barta Barri as Toscanelli
- Mercedes Barranco
- Antonio Casas
- Modesto Cid
- Emilia Clement
- Jesús Colomer
- Manuel Gas
- Federico Górriz
- Luis Induni
- Pedro Mascaró
- Jorge Morales
- Francisco Pigrau
- María Dolores Pradera
- José Sazatornil

== Bibliography ==
- Pascual Cebollada & Luis Rubio Gil. Enciclopedia del cine español: cronología. Ediciones del Serbal, 1996.
