= Marta Padovan =

Spanish actress

Marta Padovan (stage name of Conxita Alà Miquel) (Barcelona; January 9, 1938 - September 29, 2019) was a Spanish actress in theater, television, film, and dubbing.

== Biography ==
As a young woman, she studied piano at the Municipal Conservatory of Barcelona and began her film career in the late 1950s. She appeared in titles such as Where are you going, sad one?, The Forsaken or Fanny Pelopaja.

Her popularity grew with her television performances in the Catalan circuit of RTVE and on TV3, from the 1980s with series such as Marta sempre, Marta tothora, where she was the protagonist or De professió: A.P.I.. She also worked in Pedralbes Centre and Mar de fons. Her roles in the series Majoria absoluta and Nissaga de poder are also noteworthy. In the world of dubbing, she became popular for dubbing the protagonist of the American series Roseanne.

She also acted in theater from the 1960s and, during the 1970s, she had her own theater company.

== Works ==
=== Theater ===
- 1961: A Delicious Night, by Jacques Deval.
- 1963: Blas, by Claude Magnier.
- 1965: The Umbrella and the Hat, by Agustín de Quinto.
- 1966: A White Elephant, by Xavier Regàs.
- 1967: Once a Week, by Rafael Richard.
- 1969: A Forest Girl, by Joaquim Muntañola.
- 1971: Taming a Woman, by Alfonso Paso.
- 1971: Do not bite your neighbor's apple, by Rafael Richard.
- 1973: Macbett, by Eugène Ionesco.
- 1974: What Happens in the Bedroom?, by Alfonso Paso.
- 1976: Where Two Sleep... Three Sleep!, by Pierrette Bruno.
- 1986: From the Front and from the Back, by Michael Frayn.

=== Cinema ===
- 1956: Emergency Hospital
- 1958: The Wall
- 1958: The Follies of Barbara
- 1958: Your Husband Is Cheating on Us
- 1960: Love Below Zero
- 1960: Where are you going, sad one?
- 1960: The Standard-Bearers of Providence
- 1960: The Forsaken
- 1961: Horizons of Light
- 1961: The Fourth Caravel
- 1961: Pachín Admiral
- 1962: School of Seducers
- 1962: Deadly Trap
- 1962: You Have the Eyes of a Deadly Woman
- 1963: The Devil on Holiday
- 1963: The Wedding
- 1963: Crooked Path
- 1965: The Secret of Captain O'Hara
- 1965: Clark Harrison's Revenge
- 1966: Red Roses for Angelica
- 1967: It's Easy to Die in Ghentar
- 1970: Omen
- 1974: I Was the King
- 1983: Dirty Money
- 1984: Fanny Pelopaja
- 1987: A Night at the White House

=== Television ===
- 1980: Mother and Son, Limited Company
- 1985: Marta sempre, Marta tothora.
- 1988: De professió: A.P.I.
- 1995: Pedralbes Centre
- 1996: Nissaga de poder
- 2002-2004: Majoria absoluta
- 2006: Mar de fons
