= Ten Ready Rifles =

1959 film

- Film poster
- Directed by: José Luis Sáenz de Heredia
- Written by: Carlos Blanco; Roberto de Leonardis
- Starring: Francisco Rabal
- Cinematography: Francisco Sempere
- Edited by: Julio Peña
- Release date: 14 April 1959
- Running time: 100 minutes
- Countries: Spain; Italy
- Language: Spanish

Ten Ready Rifles (Spanish: Diez fusiles esperan) is a 1959 Spanish drama film directed by José Luis Sáenz de Heredia. The film concerns the Carlist Wars of the 19th century. It was entered into the 9th Berlin International Film Festival.

== Cast ==
- Francisco Rabal as José Iribarren
- Ettore Manni as Miguel
- Rosa Arenas as Teresa (as Rosita Arenas)
- Berta Riaza as Maritxu
- Memmo Carotenuto as Don Leopoldo Bejarano
- Milly Vitale as Lucía
- Félix de Pomés as Coronel García Zapata
- Santiago Rivero
- Xan das Bolas as Cañete
- María Jesús Lara
- Juan Calvo as Capellán
- Jesús Puente as Alguacil en Consejo de Guerra
- José María Lado (as Jose Mª Lado)
- Juan Cazalilla
- Carola Fernán Gómez (as Carola Fernan-Gomez)
- Pilar Clemens
- Carlos Martínez Campos (as Carlos Mnez. Campos)
- Beni Deus (as Beny Deus)
