= Nina (1959 film) =

1959 film

- Directed by: Jean Boyer
- Written by: Jean Boyer
- Based on: Nina by André Roussin
- Produced by: Maurice Teyssier
- Starring: Sophie Desmarets; Olivier Hussenot; Agnès Laurent
- Cinematography: Charles Suin
- Edited by: Jacqueline Brachet
- Music by: Georges Van Parys
- Production company: Vauban Productions
- Distributed by: Jeannic Films
- Release date: 16 January 1959
- Running time: 88 minutes
- Country: France
- Language: French

Nina is a 1959 French comedy film directed by Jean Boyer and starring Sophie Desmarets, Olivier Hussenot and Agnès Laurent.

The film is based on the 1949 play of the same title by André Roussin. It was shot at the Billancourt Studios in Paris. The film's sets were designed by the art director Jean d'Eaubonne.

== Synopsis ==
A husband plans to shoot the man having an affair with his wife, but both come to realise their desire to escape the tyrannical woman in their lives.

== Cast ==
- Sophie Desmarets as Nina Tessier
- Olivier Hussenot as Un inspecteur
- Agnès Laurent as Cécile Redon-Namur
- Jean Poiret as Adolphe Tessier
- Yves Robert as Redon-Namur
- Michel Serrault as Gérard Blonville
- Pierre Tornade as Un inspecteur
- Hélène Tossy as Concierge

== Bibliography ==
- Singer, Michael. Film Directors. Lone Eagle Publishing, 2002.
