= Farewell to Marriage =

1968 film by Juan de Orduña

- Directed by: Juan de Orduña
- Produced by: Fernando de Fuentes
- Cinematography: Alex Phillips
- Release date: 1968
- Running time: 88 minutes
- Countries: Mexico; Spain
- Language: Spanish

Farewell to Marriage (Spanish:Despedida de casada) is a 1968 Mexican film. It was produced by Fernando de Fuentes.

== Cast ==
- Ana Luisa Peluffo
- Elsa Cárdenas
- Mauricio Garcés
- Gracita Morales
- Alfredo Landa
