= Agnès Laurent =

French actress (1936–2010)

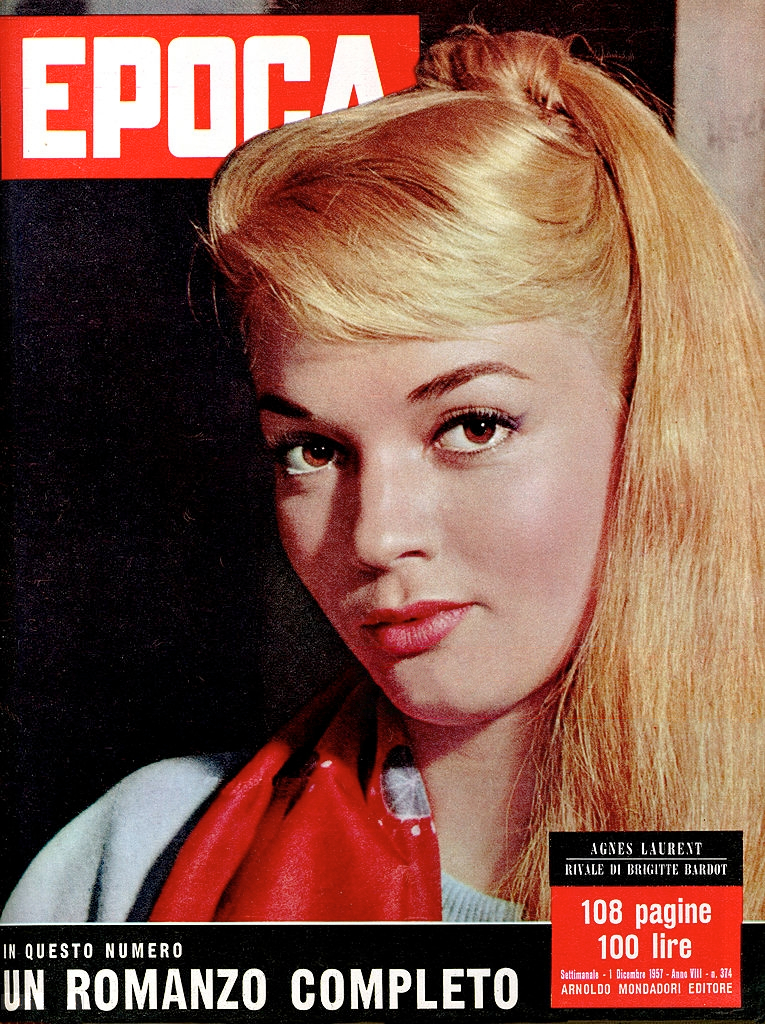
- Laurent on a 1957 cover of Epoca
- Born: 28 January 1936; Lyon; France
- Died: 16 February 2010 (aged 74); Grenoble; France
- Other name: Josette Chouleur
- Occupation: Film actress
- Years active: 1956–1961

Agnès Laurent (28 January 1936 – 16 February 2010) was a French actress. She mainly acted in France, but is perhaps known in the United Kingdom for playing the title role in the British comedy film A French Mistress.

== Selected filmography ==
- Women's Club (1956)
- Mannequins of Paris (1956)
- Les collégiennes (1957)
- Amour de poche (1957)
- Mademoiselle Strip-tease (Striptease de Paris) (1957)
- The Green Devils of Monte Cassino (1958)
- Nina (1959)
- A French Mistress (1960)
- The Big Show (1960)
- Mary Had a Little... (1961)
- Famous Love Affairs (1961)
