= Berta Riaza =

Spanish actress (1927–2022)

- Born: Berta Riaza Gómez; 27 July 1927; Madrid, Spain
- Died: 24 July 2022 (aged 95); Madrid, Spain
- Occupation: Actress
- Years active: 1947–2003

Berta Riaza Gómez (27 July 1927 – 24 July 2022) was a Spanish actress. She starred in over 100 films and 60 stage productions during her near-60 year career.

== Life ==
Born in Madrid, she began her career in 1947 on a stage play titled Historia de una casa.

In 1959, she made her movie debut with Diez fusiles esperan. Her best known movie roles include: Entre tinieblas (1983), Luces de bohemia (1985), El placer de matar (1988) and El Puzzle (2000).

Her career mainly was focused on movies and stage roles. However, she appeared in a few television shows with Televisión Española. In 1980, she starred as Doña Guillermina in the miniseries Fortunata y Jacinta.

In 2003, Riaza retired saying that the only roles she was getting were in unpopular stage plays.

== Awards ==
- National Theater Prize (1992)
- Union of Actors Award for Best Secondary Theater Performance (1995)
- Union of Actors Lifetime Award (1997)
- Gold Medal of Merit in the Fine Arts (2007)
