= Searching for Monica =

1962 film

Buscando a Mónica
- The Railway set used in the film
- Directed by: José María Forqué
- Written by: Jaime de Armiñán; Vicente Coello
- Produced by: Francisco Carcavallo; Luis Giudici
- Starring: Alberto de Mendoza; Carmen Sevilla
- Cinematography: Ricardo Younis
- Edited by: Julio Peña; Gerardo Rinaldi
- Music by: Augusto Algueró hijo; Mário Clavel
- Distributed by: AS Films
- Release date: 29 January 1962
- Running time: 93 minutes
- Country: Argentina
- Language: Spanish

Searching for Monica (Spanish: Buscando a Mónica) is a 1962 Argentine-Spanish black-and-white film musical film drama directed by José María Forqué. The film premiered on 29 January 1962 in Madrid and was named El Secreto de Mónica. It was first shown in Argentina on 29 March in Buenos Aires. It starred Alberto de Mendoza and Carmen Sevilla.

== Cast ==
- Carmen Sevilla as Mónica Durán
- Alberto de Mendoza as Antonio Montes
- Jardel Filho as Juan
- Ana Casares
- Enrique Diosdado (as Enrique Alvarez Diosdado)
- Adolfo Marsillach as Daniel Ferrero
- Guillermo Battaglia as Mónica's father
- Antonia Herrero
- Mario Baroffio
- Alma Montiel
- Orestes Soriani (as Oreste Soriani)
- Cayetano Biondo
- Rodolfo Crespi
- Alberto Fernández de Rosa (as Alberto F. De Rosa)
- Carlos Cotto (as Carlos Cotto)
- Elena Lucena (as Lucy)
- Sara Yuter
- Domingo Garibotto
- Aída Villadeamigo
- Alberto Quiles
- Nonne L. de Perez
- Amelia Folsini
- Yamandú Romero (as Yamandú Romero)
- Hector G. Corti
- Miguel Yunes
- Hector Givagnoli
- Mario Laserna
- Felipe Duarte
- Juan Laserna
- I. Del Bosco
- Eduardo Diaz
- Humberto Martinez
- Oscar Zaccari
- Rosángela Balbó
- Nelly Antonelli
- Elvira Porcel
