= Anchor Button (1961 film) =

1961 film

- Spanish: Botón de ancla
- Directed by: Miguel Lluch
- Written by: Ramón Torrado; H.S. Valdés; José Luis de Azcárraga
- Produced by: Ignacio F. Iquino
- Starring: Manuel Gil; Ramón Arcusa; Manuel de la Calva
- Cinematography: Ricardo Albiñana
- Edited by: Ramon Quadreny; Pilar Serrano
- Music by: Enrique Escobar
- Production company: IFI Producción
- Distributed by: IFISA
- Release date: 27 January 1961
- Running time: 93 minutes
- Country: Spain
- Language: Spanish

Anchor Button (Spanish: Botón de ancla) is a 1961 Spanish musical comedy film directed by Miguel Lluch and starring Manuel Gil, Ramón Arcusa and Manuel de la Calva. It is a remake of the 1948 film of the same title about three naval academy cadets.

The film was filmed at the Naval Military Academy in Marín (Pontevedra) and its surroundings.

== Cast ==
- Manuel Gil as Guardamarina Carlos Corbián
- Ramón Arcusa as Guardamarina José Luis Salgado
- Manuel de la Calva as Un guadamarina
- María del Sol Arce as María Rosa
- Vicente Haro as Enrique
- Armonía Montez
- Miguel Gila as Trinquete
- Manuel Gas as Oficial
- José María Caffarel as Segundo Comandante
- Manuel de Melero
- Luis Induni as Padre de María
- Mari Ely
- Juanita Espín as Visitante Academia de Marina
- Berta Carbonell as Visitante Academia de Marina
- Isabel Osca
- Isabel Ruiz
- Josep Peñalver

== Bibliography ==
- Bentley, Bernard. A Companion to Spanish Cinema. Boydell & Brewer, 2008.
