= The Robbers (film) =

1962 film

- Directed by: Francisco Rovira Beleta
- Written by: Francisco Rovira Beleta; Manuel María Saló; Tomás Salvador
- Starring: Pierre Brice
- Cinematography: Aurelio G. Larraya
- Edited by: Juan Luis Oliver
- Release date: 26 February 1962
- Running time: 109 minutes
- Country: Spain
- Language: Spanish

The Robbers (Spanish: Los atracadores) is a 1962 Spanish crime film directed by Francisco Rovira Beleta. It was entered into the 12th Berlin International Film Festival.

== Cast ==
- Pierre Brice - El Señorito
- Manuel Gil - Ramón Orea Bellido 'Chico'
- Julián Mateos - Carmelo Barrachina 'Compadre'
- Agnès Spaak - Isabel
- Antonia Oyamburu
- Rosa Fúster
- Carlos Ibarzábal
- Alejo del Peral
- Mariano Martín
- Carmen Pradillo
- Carlos Miguel Solá
- Camino Delgado - (as Mª Camino Delgado)
- Ana Morera
- Gustavo Re - Cómplice del mago que acosa a Isabel
- Joaquín Ferré
- Enrique Guitart - Abogado
- María Asquerino - Asunción
