= Red Cross Girls =

- Spanish: Las chicas de la Cruz Roja
- Written by: Rafael J. Salvia; Pedro Masó
- Produced by: Pedro Masó
- Starring: Antonio Casal; Luz Márquez; Mabel Karr; Concha Velasco; Tony Leblanc; Katia Loritz; Arturo Fernández; Ricardo Zamora Jr.
- Cinematography: Alejandro Ulloa
- Edited by: José Antonio Rojo
- Music by: Augusto Algueró
- Distributed by: Compañía Industrial Film Español S.A.
- Release date: 5 November 1958; (Madrid)
- Running time: 83 minutes
- Country: Spain

Red Cross Girls (Spanish: Las chicas de la Cruz Roja) is a 1958 Spanish musical romantic comedy film directed by Rafael J. Salvia and starring Antonio Casal, Luz Márquez, Mabel Karr, Concha Velasco, Tony Leblanc and Katia Loritz.

== Plot ==
Four women from different social backgrounds - Julia (Luz Márquez), Isabel (Mabel Karr), Paloma (Concha Velasco) and Marion (Katia Loritz) - meet in Madrid while soliciting donations for the Red Cross, attracting men and becoming good friends in the process.

== Cast ==
- Antonio Casal as Andrés
- Luz Márquez as Julia
- Mabel Karr as Isabel
- Concha Velasco as Paloma
- Tony Leblanc as Pepe
- Katia Loritz as Marion
- Arturo Fernández as Ernesto
- Ricardo Zamora Jr. as León

== Reception ==
The film critic Lorenzo Hortelano considered Red Cross Girls one of the best examples of the "well-meaning, humorous and nostalgic popular" Spanish cinema of the 1950s and 1960s, following a romantic narrative set against a background that "praises "the joy of the 'modern' Madrid of the fifties."

In the 1980s some Spanish critics dismissed this film's genre as “silly comedies” that presented a false view of Spanish life.

== Soundtrack ==
The main theme, composed by Augusto Algueró became a popular hit in Spain.
