= What Have I Done to Deserve This? (film) =

What Have I Done to Deserve This?!
- Theatrical release poster
- Spanish: ¿Qué he hecho yo para merecer esto!
- Directed by: Pedro Almodóvar
- Written by: Pedro Almodóvar
- Produced by: Hervé Hachuel
- Starring: Carmen Maura; Luis Hostalot; Gonzalo Suárez; Ángel de Andrés López; Verónica Forqué; Kiti Mánver; Chus Lampreave; Juan Martínez; Emilio G. Caba; Katia Loritz; Amparo Soler Leal
- Cinematography: Ángel Luis Fernández
- Edited by: José Salcedo
- Music by: Bernardo Bonezzi
- Production companies: Tesauro S.A.; Kaktus Producciones Cinematográficas
- Distributed by: PROCINES
- Release dates: 23 August 1984 (Montreal World Film Festival); 25 October 1984 (Spain)
- Running time: 101 minutes
- Country: Spain
- Languages: Spanish; German; English; French
- Box office: ESP 116.7 million (USD$901,508)

What Have I Done to Deserve This? (Spanish: ¿Qué he hecho yo para merecer esto!) is a 1984 Spanish black comedy film written and directed by Pedro Almodóvar. The title is sometimes given with an exclamation mark at the end rather than a question mark. Starring Carmen Maura, Ángel de Andrés López, Chus Lampreave and Verónica Forqué, the film follows the misadventures of an overworked housewife and her dysfunctional family. Almodóvar has described What Have I Done as a homage to Italian neorealism, although this tribute also involves jokes about paedophilia, prostitution, and a telekinetic child.

== Plot ==
Gloria, a downtrodden housewife, lives with her husband Antonio, mother-in-law and two sons in a small, shabby and overcrowded apartment located by the Madrid motorway. Besides taking care of her home and family, Gloria also works as a cleaning lady to make ends meet and takes amphetamines to keep going. Her marriage to Antonio, a taxi driver, is on the rocks. 15 years earlier, in Germany, Antonio worked as a driver for Ingrid Muller, a German singer with whom he had a brief affair. His only mementos of their liaison are a signed photograph and a tape of her song Nur nicht Aus Liebe Weinen which he constantly plays and which Gloria detests. Antonio's services for Ingrid involved copying letters that she had allegedly received from Hitler himself. In his taxi, Antonio meets the writer Lucas and Antonio casually mentions this fact to Lucas, who suggests that they forge Hitler's diaries for a big profit.

There is also a book of Ingrid's memoirs written by a friend which contains letters from Hitler which Antonio helped forge. Antonio is trying to teach the art of forgery to one of his sons, as this talent will be his only inheritance. The younger son, Miguel, who is twelve, sleeps around with older men. When Gloria confronts Miguel, telling him she knows he has been sleeping with older men (including his friend's father), Miguel responds: "I'm the master of my own body." Gloria's eldest son, Toni, who is fourteen, wants to become a farmer and is saving up enough money to buy a farm by peddling heroin. The grandmother, who is addicted to soft drinks, shares the same dream of returning to her native village. Gloria's friends are her two neighbors: Cristal and Juani. Cristal is a prostitute with a heart of gold. Juani, is a bitter woman obsessed with cleanliness and vulgar ornaments who bullies her daughter, Vanessa, who has telekinetic powers.

Gloria's life has become unbearable. She has no hope, no money and no opportunities and struggles with her husband to pay for the apartment, the television, the telephone, the lighting, the heating, the rates, and the weekly shopping. Increasingly desperate to find extra money to pay the bills, she is forced to work for a couple of bankrupt writers. Another aggravation is a lizard that Toni and his grandmother have brought home. Unable to pay for Miguel's dental treatment, Gloria has little hesitation in allowing Miguel to live with the dentist, a pedophile. Miguel accepts once certain material conditions are met.

Refused sedatives without a prescription by a pharmacist, the defeated Gloria returns home to find her husband preparing to take Ingrid Muller for a drive. An argument ensues, Antonio slaps Gloria, and she strikes him on the head with a leg of ham. Hitting his neck on the sink, he dies instantly. The police investigation fails to uncover Gloria's guilt. Toni and his grandmother leave Madrid for her village. Abandoned, Gloria contemplates committing suicide. She changes her mind when her son Miguel returns unexpectedly and says he wants to take care of her.

== Cast ==
- Carmen Maura as Gloria: housewife and cleaning woman
- Ángel de Andrés López as Antonio: Gloria's husband, taxi driver and forger of letters
- Juan Martínez as Toni: their 14-year-old son and drug dealer
- Miguel Ángel Herranz as Miguel: their 12-year-old son
- Chus Lampreave as Grandmother: Antonio's mother who lives with them
- Verónica Forqué as Cristal: prostitute who lives in the same apartment block
- Kiti Mánver as Juani: dressmaker who lives in the same apartment block
- Sonia Hohmann as Vanessa: Juani's daughter with telekinetic powers
- Gonzalo Suárez as Lucas Villalba: writer who meets Antonio in a taxi
- Amparo Soler Leal as Patricia: Villalba's wife
- Katia Loritz as Ingrid Müller: German woman, Antonio's former girlfriend
- Luis Hostalot as Polo: Policeman with erectile dysfunction
- Javier Gurruchaga as Dentist who wants to adopt Miguel
- Cecilia Roth as Woman in TV commercial
- Pedro Almodóvar as Playback 'La bien pagá'
- Tinín Almodóvar as Bank teller
- Carlitos as Dinero ("Money"): lizard

== Background ==
What Have I Done, Almodovar's fourth film, became the first of his works to be released theatrically in the U.S. premiering to sold-out crowds as part of New Directors/New Films series, co-sponsored by the New York Film Festival and the Film Department of the Museum of Modern Art. The film, set in the tower blocks around Madrid, depicts female frustration and family breakdown, echoing Jean-Luc Godard's Two or Three Things I Know About Her and strong story plots from Roald Dahl's Lamb to the Slaughter and Truman Capote's "A Day's Work" but with Almodóvar's unique approach to filmmaking. Technically, What Have I Done? is deliberately crude and the production values raw, a combined result of the film's low-budget as well as Almodovar's relative lack of experience. But the film's shabby look is in tune with the tale's squalid realistic context and social class of its protagonists. What Have I Done? was critically much better received than Almodovar's three previous films and put him on the movie map in America as a major talent to watch. The film was shot in Madrid and features the Colmena de la M-30 residential complex located along the M-30 motorway, which Almodovar had noticed and became interested in years prior to filming. Reflecting on seeing the buildings, he said: "When I went to work at a Telefónica warehouse near the town of Fuencarral, I drove along the M-30 every day. I was always impressed by those enormous beehives that rise above the highway."

== Reception ==
On the review aggregator website Rotten Tomatoes, 75% of 8 critics' reviews are positive.
