= Adolfo Marsillach =

Spanish actor (1928–2002)

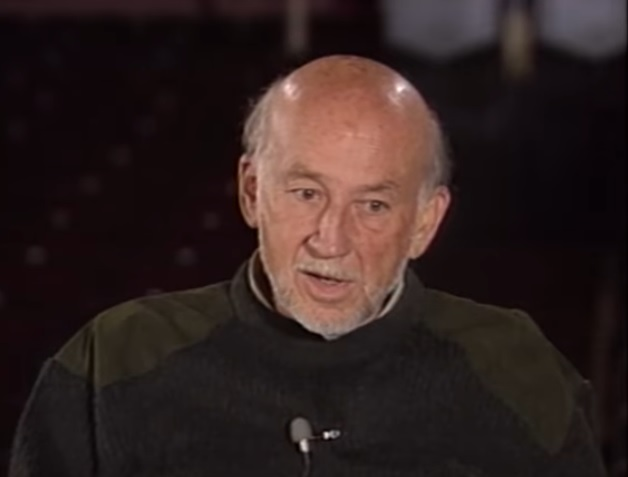
- Adolfo Marsillach
- Born: Adolfo Marsillach Soriano; 25 January 1928; Barcelona, Spain
- Died: 21 January 2002 (aged 73); Madrid, Spain
- Children: Cristina and Blanca

Adolfo Marsillach Soriano (January 25, 1928 – January 21, 2002) was a Spanish actor, playwright and theatre director. He was born in Barcelona.

He was known for his collaborations with playwright Alberto Miralles.

He is the father of actresses Blanca Marsillach and Cristina Marsillach.

== Partial filmography ==
- Mariona Rebull (1947) - Darío Rueda
- Cerca de la ciudad (1952) - Padre José
- Don Juan Tenorio (1952) - Capitán Centellas
- Jeromín (1953) - Felipe II
- Flight 971 (1953) - Doctor
- Torrepartida (1956) - Rafael
- La cárcel de cristal (1957) - Julio Togores
- El frente infinito (1959) - Padre Herrera
- Salto a la gloria (1959) - Santiago Ramón y Cajal
- Un hecho violento (1959) - Captain Clark
- Maribel and the Strange Family (1960) - Marcelino
- Police Calling 091 (1960) - Andrés Martín
- Mi calle (1960) - Gonzalo
- Peace Never Comes (1960) - López
- Searching for Monica (1962) - Daniel Ferrero
- Historia de una noche (1962) - Daniel Romero
- Alegre juventud (1963) - Padre Ramón
- La pandilla de los once (1963) - Toni 'El Jefe'
- The Black Tulip (1964) - Baron La Mouche
- Champagne for Savages (1964) - Le docteur
- Los dinamiteros (1964) - Actor en 'Rapiña en Golden City' (uncredited)
- El tímido (1965)
- The Wild Ones of San Gil Bridge (1966) - Sacerdote
- Una historia de amor (1967) - Gómez
- Camino de la verdad (1968)
- El certificado (1970) - Víctor Escuder
- Flor de santidad (1973) - Conde de Añobre
- The Regent's Wife (1974) - Víctor Quintanar
- La cruz del diablo (1975) - Cesar del Rio
- El hombre de los hongos (1976) - Everardo / father
- La ciutat cremada (1976) - Francesc Cambó
- Al servicio de la mujer española (1978) - Julio Hernández / Soledad
- El poderoso influjo de la luna (1981) - Emilio
- Sesión continua (1984) - José Manuel Varela
- The Heifer (1985) - Marqués
- Delirios de amor (1986) - Juan Bautista Salgado (segment "Delirio 1")
- Esquilache (1989) - Carlos III
- The Long Winter (1992) - Casimiro Casals (final film role)
