= Atraco a las tres =

1962 film

- Promotional poster by Francisco Fernández Zarza
- Directed by: José María Forqué
- Written by: Rafael J. Salvia; Pedro Masó; Vicente Coello
- Produced by: José Alted
- Starring: José Luis López Vázquez; Cassen; Gracita Morales; Katia Loritz; Manuel Alexandre; Agustín González; José Orjas; Alfredo Landa; Paula Martel; Rafaela Aparicio; José María Caffarel; Jesús Guzmán; Pedro Mari Sánchez; Lola Gaos
- Cinematography: Alejandro Ulloa
- Edited by: Pedro del Rey
- Music by: Adolfo Waitzman
- Release date: 20 December 1962 (Spain)
- Running time: 92 minutes
- Country: Spain
- Language: Spanish

Atraco a las tres (Robbery at 3 o'clock) is a 1962 Spanish comedy film directed by José María Forqué. It is inspired by Mario Monicelli's masterpiece Big Deal on Madonna Street. Critic Diego Galán of El País described it as a magnificent farce and one of the best Spanish comedies.

== Plot ==
Fernando Galindo, a bank clerk, persuades his colleagues to rob the bank where they work in revenge for manager's dismissal and poor employment conditions. They decide to fake a robbery similar to those featured in films. Despite their careful preparation, the plan fails because a band of real robbers burst into the bank the same day they had planned to carry out their raid.

== Cast ==
- José Luis López Vázquez as Fernando Galindo
- Cassen as Martínez
- Gracita Morales as Enriqueta
- Katia Loritz as Katia Durán
- Manuel Alexandre as Benítez
- Agustín González as Cordero
- Manuel Díaz González as Don Prudencio
- José Orjas as Don Felipe
- Alfredo Landa as Castrillo
- Rafaela Aparicio
- Lola Gaos
