= Francisco Rovira Beleta =

Spanish screenwriter and film director

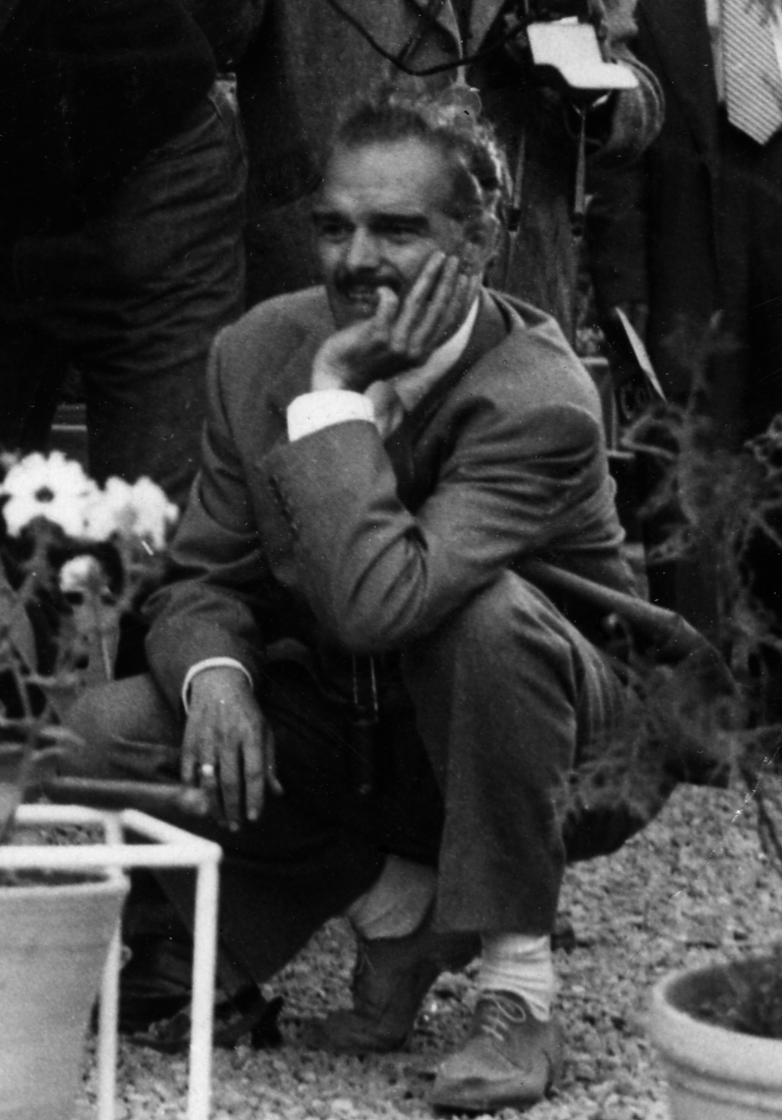
- Born: 1913; Barcelona, Spain
- Died: 23 June 1999 (aged 85–86)
- Occupation: Film director
- Years active: 1952 – 1967

Francisco Rovira Beleta (1913 in Barcelona – 23 June 1999) was a Spanish screenwriter and film director who was twice nominated for an Academy Award. His film Los atracadores was entered into the 12th Berlin International Film Festival. His 1963 film Los Tarantos was nominated for an Academy Award in the Best Foreign Film category. Four years later, his film El amor brujo was also nominated for the Best Foreign Language Oscar and was entered into the 5th Moscow International Film Festival.

== Selected filmography ==
- Thirty Nine Love Letters (1950)
- Luna de sangre (1952)
- Hay un camino a la derecha (1953)
- Eleven Pairs of Boots (1954)
- Andalusia Express (1956)
- Familia provisional (1958)
- The Big Show (1960)
- Los Atracadores (1962)
- Los Tarantos (1963)
- La dama del alba (1966)
- El amor brujo (1967)
- The Lonely Woman (1973)
