= Manuel Gil =

Spanish actor

- Born: 13 December 1933 (age 92); Cervera del Río Alhama, La Rioja, Spain
- Other name: Manuel Gil Huidobro
- Occupation: Actor
- Years active: 1959-

Manuel Gil is a Spanish film and television actor.

== Selected filmography ==
- College Boarding House (1959)
- Anchor Button (1961)
- Ursus (1961)
- The Robbers (1962)
- Code Name: Jaguar (1965)
- Great Friends (1967)
- Sor Ye Ye (1967)
- Corazón salvaje (1968)
- Simón Bolívar (1969)
- Growing Leg, Diminishing Skirt (1970)
- The Legion Like Women (1976)

== Bibliography ==
- Peter Cowie & Derek Elley. World Filmography: 1967. Fairleigh Dickinson University Press, 1977.
