= Anchor Button (1948 film) =

- Spanish: Botón de ancla
- Directed by: Ramón Torrado
- Written by: Ramón Torrado; H.S. Valdés; José Luis de Azcárraga
- Starring: Antonio Casal; Jorge Mistral; Fernando Fernán Gómez; Isabel de Pomés
- Cinematography: Manuel Berenguer; Andrés Pérez Cubero
- Edited by: Gaby Peñalba
- Music by: Jesús García Leoz
- Production company: Suevia Films
- Distributed by: Suevia Films
- Release date: 13 January 1948
- Running time: 100 minutes
- Country: Spain
- Language: Spanish

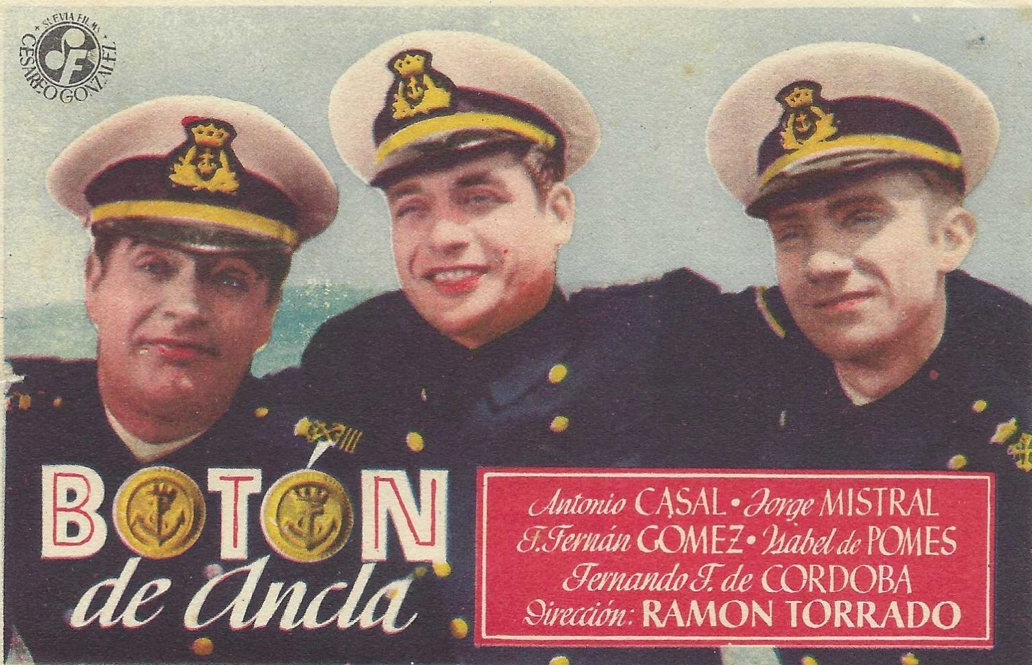
Program for the film Anchor Button

Anchor Button (Spanish: Botón de ancla) is a 1948 Spanish comedy film directed by Ramón Torrado and starring Antonio Casal, Jorge Mistral, Fernando Fernán Gómez and Isabel de Pomés. The plot focuses on three students at the Spanish naval academy. It was remade in 1961.

The film was filmed at the Naval Military Academy in Marín (Pontevedra) and its surroundings.

== Cast ==
- Antonio Casal as José Luis Bahamonde
- Jorge Mistral as Carlos Corbián
- Fernando Fernán Gómez as Enrique Tejada y Sandoval
- Isabel de Pomés as María Rosa
- Fernando Fernández de Córdoba
- Félix Fernández as Comandante segundo
- Mary Santpere as Señorita #1
- Linda Tamoa
- María Isbert as Señorita #2
- Xan das Bolas as Trinquete
- José de Caparrós
- Encarna Paso
- Alicia Romay

== Bibliography ==
- Bentley, Bernard. A Companion to Spanish Cinema. Boydell & Brewer, 2008.
