= Rafael Alonso =

Spanish actor

- Born: Rafael Alonso Ochoa; 5 July 1920; Madrid, Spain
- Died: 24 August 1998 (aged 78); Madrid, Spain
- Occupation: Actor
- Years active: 1951-1998

Rafael Alonso Ochoa (5 July 1920 – 24 October 1998) was a Spanish actor. He appeared in more than 120 films and television shows between 1951 and 1998. He died on 24 October 1998 at the age of 78 from cancer and he was cremated at Cementerio de la Almudena.

== Selected filmography ==
- Malibran's Song (1951)
- Welcome Mr. Marshall! (1953)
- Cabaret (1953)
- Esa pareja feliz (1953)
- Comedians (1954)
- El baile (1959)
- Mi calle (1960)
- My Wedding Night (1961)
- The Mustard Grain (1962)
- Tomy's Secret (1963)
- He's My Man! (1966)
- Sor Citroën (1967)
- The Man Who Wanted to Kill Himself (1970)
- Variety (1971)
- The Doubt (1972)
- The Guerrilla (1973)
- Zorrita Martinez (1975)
- Unmarried Mothers (1975)
- La colmena (1982)
- All Is Possible in Granada (1982)
- On the Far Side of the Tunnel (1994)
- The Grandfather (1998)
