= José María Forqué =

Spanish screenwriter and film director

- Born: José María Forqué Galindo; 8 March 1923; Zaragoza, Spain
- Died: 17 March 1995 (aged 72); Madrid, Spain
- Spouse: Carmen Vázquez-Vigo

José María Forqué Galindo (8 March 1923 – 17 March 1995) was a Spanish screenwriter and film director.

== Biography ==
He was the father of the actress Verónica Forqué and the director Álvaro Forqué. He died on 17 March 1995 in Madrid at the age of 72 from a liver cancer. He was cremated at Cementerio de la Almudena. He was married to the actress and dramaturge Carmen Vázquez-Vigo, who died on 22 March 2018 at the age of 95.

The José María Forqué Awards are named after him.

== Filmography ==
- 1947 : Juventudes de España, bajo una Patria hermosa
- 1951 : María Morena
- 1951 : Fog and Sun
- 1954 : The Devil Plays the Flute
- 1954 : Un Día perdido
- 1956 : The Legion of Silence
- 1956 : Embajadores en el infierno
- 1957 : Whom God Forgives
- 1958 : Un Hecho violento
- 1958 : Night and Dawn
- 1959 : Baila La Chunga
- 1959 : Back to the Door
- 1960 : Maribel and the Strange Family
- 1960 : Police Calling 091
- 1961 : Usted puede ser un asesino
- 1962 : Searching for Monica
- 1962 : Accident 703
- 1962 : Atraco a las tres
- 1963 : La becerrada
- 1963 : El Juego de la verdad
- 1964 : Tengo 17 años
- 1964 : Casi un caballero
- 1965 : Vacaciones para Ivette
- 1965 : Black Humor (segment 2, "La Mandrilla - Miss Wilma")
- 1966 : Balearic Caper
- 1966 : Las Viudas (episode "El Retrato de Regino")
- 1967 : Un Millón en la basura
- 1967 : Yo he visto a la muerte
- 1967 : Las que tienen que servir
- 1968 : Pecados conyugales
- 1968 : La Vil seducción
- 1968 : Un Diablo bajo la almohada
- 1968 : ¡Dame un poco de amooor...!
- 1969 : Estudio amueblado 2.P.
- 1970 : El Triangulito
- 1970 : El Monumento
- 1971 : El Ojo del huracán
- 1972 : La Cera virgen
- 1973 : Tarot
- 1974 : Una Pareja... distinta
- 1974 : Lola
- 1976 : Vuelve, querida Nati
- 1976 : El Segundo poder
- 1976 : Madrid, Costa Fleming
- 1979 : La Mujer de la tierra caliente
- 1980 : ¡Qué verde era mi duque!
- 1980 : El Canto de la cigarra
- 1982 : "Ramón y Cajal" (Serie TV)
- 1980 : "El Español y los siete pecados capitales" (serie TV)
- 1983 : "El Jardín de Venus" (serie TV)
- 1986 : Romanza final
- 1988 : "Miguel Servet, la sangre y la ceniza" (serie TV)
- 1994 : Nexus 2.431
