= You Have the Eyes of a Deadly Woman (1962 film) =

1962 film

- Directed by: José María Elorrieta
- Written by: José Manuel Iglesias; Juan Antonio Verdugo
- Based on: You Have the Eyes of a Deadly Woman by Enrique Jardiel Poncela
- Starring: Susana Campos; Virgílio Teixeira; Marta Padovan
- Cinematography: Alfonso Nieva
- Music by: Federico Moreno Torroba
- Production company: C.I.C.E.
- Distributed by: Producciones Cinematográficas Españolas Falcó & Cía
- Release date: 1962
- Running time: 86 minutes
- Country: Spain
- Language: Spanish

You Have the Eyes of a Deadly Woman (Spanish: Usted tiene ojos de mujer fatal) is a 1962 Spanish comedy film directed by José María Elorrieta and starring Susana Campos, Virgílio Teixeira and Marta Padovan. It is an adaptation of the 1926 play by Enrique Jardiel Poncela.

== Cast ==
- Susana Campos
- Virgílio Teixeira
- Marta Padovan
- Manolo Gómez Bur
- Trini Alonso
- Carlos Casaravilla
- Pastor Serrador
- María Silva
- José María Tasso

== Bibliography ==
- Goble, Alan. The Complete Index to Literary Sources in Film. Walter de Gruyter, 1999.
- McKay, Douglas R. Enrique Jardiel Poncela. Twayne Publishers, 1974.
