= Accident 703 =

1962 film

Accidente 703
- Directed by: José María Forqué
- Written by: Vicente Coello; José María Forqué
- Produced by: Julio Irigoyen
- Starring: Manuel Alexandre; Ángel Álvarez; Carlos Ballesteros; Vicente Bañó; Maite Blasco; Frank Braña
- Cinematography: Juan Mariné
- Edited by: Pedro del Rey
- Music by: Adolfo Waitzman
- Distributed by: As Films S.A. (Spain)
- Release date: 6 August 1962
- Running time: 84 minutes
- Countries: Spain; Argentina
- Language: Spanish

Accident 703 (Spanish: Accidente 703) is a 1962 Spanish drama film directed by José María Forqué and written by Vicente Coello.

== Release ==
The film was released on 6 August 1962 in Spain and was released later in Argentina.

== Cast ==
- Manuel Alexandre
- Ángel Álvarez
- Carlos Ballesteros
- Vicente Bañó
- Maite Blasco
- Frank Braña
- Ángela Bravo
- José María Caffarel
- Susana Campos
- Ricardo Canales
- Antonio Casas
- Antonio Cerro
- Enrique Closas
- Carlos Cores
- Francisco Cornet
- Miguel Ángel de la Iglesia .... child
- Antonio Delgado
- Alejo del Peral
- Hebe Donay
- Enrique Echevarría
- Irán Eory
- Carlos Estrada
- Pedro Fenollar
- Lola Gálvez
- Gemma García
- Tito García
- Manolo Gómez Bur
- Julia Gutiérrez Caba
- Jesús Guzmán
- Lolita Herrera
- Guillermo Hidalgo
- Maribel Hidalgo
- Rufino Inglés
- María Luisa Lamata
- José Luis López Vázquez
- Carmen Lozano
- Jacinto Martín
- Maribel Martín .... child
- José Morales
- Guadalupe Muñoz Sampedro
- José Orjas
- Rosa Palomar (as Rosita Palomar)
- Erasmo Pascual
- Jesús Puente
- Elisa Romay
- Concha Sánchez
- Ángel Terrón
- Nuria Torray
- Ana María Ventura
- José Villasante
