= Gracita Morales =

Spanish actress (1928–1995)

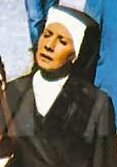
- Gracitas Morales in Sor Citroen
- Born: María Gracia Morales Carvajal; 11 November 1928; Madrid, Spain
- Died: 3 April 1995 (aged 66); Madrid, Spain
- Years active: 1954–1989

María Gracia Morales Carvajal (11 November 1928 – 3 April 1995) better known as Gracita Morales was a classic Spanish film actress with a famous high-pitched voice. She was one of the most popular Spanish actresses of the 1960s and 1970s, in both leading and supporting roles. Some of her more notable films included Atraco a las tres (1962, as Enriqueta), Sor Citroën (1967), and ¡Cómo está el servicio! (1968). She acted in many films as a maid. By the end of the 1970s she had performed in nearly 100 films. After this her health declined and her career diminished as she battled severe depression and addiction to pills. She remained active as a stage actress up until 1991. She died in Madrid on 3 April 1995 of respiratory failure.

== Selected filmography ==
Year	Title	Role	Notes
1960	Heaven at Home	Patient	
1960	My Street	Purita	
1960	Don Lucio y el hermano pío	Gracita	
1960	Maribel and the Strange Family	Niní	
1960	Police Calling 091	Salesperson	
1961	Siempre es domingo		
1961	Los que no fuimos a la guerra		
1961	Los Pedigüeños		
1961	Abuelita Charleston		
1961	Esa pícara pelirroja		
1962	You and Me Are Three	Hospital telephone operator	
1962	Vamos a contar mentiras		
1962	Vuelve San Valentín		
1962	El sol en el espejo		
1962	Escuela de seductoras		
1962	Fin de semana		
1962	La casta Susana		
1962	Los Guerrilleros		
1962	The Mustard Grain	Evelio's wife	
1962	Canción de juventud		
1962	Chica para todo		
1963	Cuatro bodas y pico		
1963	Millonario por un día	Paz	
1963	Atraco a las tres	Enriqueta	
1964	La chica del gato	Guadalupe	
1964	Casi un caballero		
1964	Los Palomos	Virtudes	
1964	Vacaciones para Ivette		
1965	La visita que no tocó el timbre		
1965	Más bonita que ninguna		
1965	Operación Cabaretera	Hipólita, alias 'Lita'	
1965	Un vampiro para dos	Luisita	
1965	La ciudad no es para mí		
1965	Hoy como ayer		
1965	Algunas lecciones de amor		
1965	Television Stories	Eladio's pregnant wife	
1966	Aquí mando yo		
1966	Operación secretaria		
1967	Una señora estupenda		
1967	Pero ¿En qué país vivimos?		
1967	Sor Citroën	Tomasa	
1967	Las que tienen que servir		
1967	Novios 68	Lucía	
1967	Forty Degrees in the Shade	Filomena	
1967	Good Morning, Little Countess		
1967	Crónica de nueve meses		
1968	Objetivo Bi-Ki-Ni	Justina Salguero	
1968	Mi marido y sus complejos		
1968	Long Play		
1968	¡Cómo está el servicio!	Vicenta Berruguillo	
1968	Farewell to Marriage		
1969	Pepa Doncel	Trini, alias 'La Amoníaco'	
1969	Matrimonios separados		
1969	Las panteras se comen a los ricos		
1969	Juicio de faldas		
1969	El taxi de los conflictos		
1969	Déle color al difunto		
1969	Cómo casarse en siete días		
1970	Préstame quince días		
1970	La casa de los Martínez		
1970	En un lugar de la Manga		
1970	A mí las mujeres ni fu ni fa		
1971	Si Fulano fuese Mengano		
1971	La graduada		
1972	Guapo heredero busca esposa		
1974	Dormir y ligar, todo es empezar		
1975	Vuelve, querida Nati		
1975	Mi adúltero esposo		
1978	Nunca en horas de clase		
1978	Donde hay patrón		
1982	Adulterio Nacional		
1984	El pico 2	Adela	
1984	Play-Boy en paro		
1984	La de Troya en el Palmar		
1985	El donante		
1987	No, hija, no		
1988	Canción triste de...		
