= Alfonso Paso =

Spanish playwright

Alfonso Paso (12 September 1926 – 10 July 1978) was a Spanish dramatist. He wrote over a hundred plays, mainly light comedies, sometimes laced with black humour and tragedy. There were also police dramas and examples of what he called "social theatre". He was known for the well crafted complexity of his plots and for the originality of his situations and characters.

== Life ==
Alfonso Paso Gil was born into a "theatre dynasty" in Madrid. His father was the Zarzuela playwright and librettist Antonio Paso y Cano (1878–1950). His mother was the actress Juana Gil.

Early on he abandoned a career as an aeronautical engineer and turned to the study of Philosophy and Literature, graduating in 1952 and focusing on American History and Archeology. Later he studied Medicine and Psychiatry, then switching again, this time to journalism. He would continue to work as a journalist until the mid-1970s. He married Evangelina Jardiel, daughter of Enrique Jardiel Poncela (1901–1952). Their children included the actress Paloma Paso Jardiel. Although he often worked as an actor, his more lasting notability results from his work as a writer.

He died of liver cancer in Madrid on 10 July 1978.

== Writing career ==
His first comedy, "Un tic-tac de reloj" ("A ricking clock") was a one-act play which he wrote in 1946. During his early years as a dramatist he was identified as a promoter of experimental theatre, while other sources refer to an intention to reinvent the genre, with plays such as "Juicio contra un sinvergüenza" ("Judgment against a rogue") and "Los pobrecitos" ("The poor wretches"), but during the 1950s and 1960s he deferred to the more conservative tastes of theatre audiences in Franco's Spain, writing in a more consciously escapist and entertaining style. His success was massive: he became Spain's most prolific dramatists, the author, according to one source, of no fewer than 436 theatrical works. The same source speculates that he may have been one of the first dramatists to make a small fortune. During the 1968 season, he had seven plays running simultaneously in seven different Madrid theatres, each with three performances daily. His commercial success owed much to the fact that many of his plays were adapted for the cinema.

Some years after his death his works were still attracting great interest, and were well received outside Spain, notably in Germany, Turkey, the Czech Republic, Hungary and Mexico. His works were translated into more than 24 languages, including Italian, French, Portuguese, English, German and Arabic. He was the first Spanish author to have a live play produced on Broadway in New York, the work in question being El canto de la cigarra (English: Song of the Grasshopper). Another of his plays, Que casado casa quiere, is best known as the basis of the long-running Mexican television series Una familia de diez.

A particular admirer was the actor-director José Vilar (actor), who found large audiences for his work on Chilean and Peruvian television during the 1970s and early 1980s.

== Output ==
=== Theatre (some better known works) ===
- Juicio contra un sinvergüenza (1952)
- Una bomba llamada Abelardo (1953)
- Los pobrecitos (1957)
- El cielo dentro de casa (1957)
- Usted puede ser un asesino (1958, llevada al cine)
- Papá se enfada por todo (1959)
- No hay novedad, Doña Adela (1959)
- La boda de la chica (1960)
- Pregunta por Julio César (1960)
- Cuidado con las personas formales (1960)
- Cosas de papá y mamá (1960)
- Cuatro y Ernesto (1960)
- Sentencia de muerte (1960)
- Una tal Dulcinea (1961)
- Vamos a contar mentiras (1961)
- Aurelia y sus hombres (1961, Premio Nacional de Teatro)
- Los derechos de la mujer (1962)
- Al final de la cuerda (1962)
- De profesión, sospechoso (1962)
- Las que tienen que servir (1962)
- El mejor mozo de España (1962)
- Sosteniendo el tipo (1962)
- El canto de la cigarra (1963)
- Las mujeres los prefieren pachuchos (1963)
- La corbata, (1963)
- Los Palomos (1964, llevada al cine)
- Carmen tomó la roja, (1964)
- La oficina (1965)
- Educando a un idiota (1965)
- Enseñar a un sinvergüenza (1966)
- ¡Estos chicos de ahora! (1967)
- Atrapar a un asesino (1968)
- ¡Cómo está el servicio! (1968)
- Viuda ella, viudo él (1968)
- Una monja (1968)
- El armario (1969)
- Nerón-Paso (1969)
- Tú me acostumbraste (1970)
