= Pedro Masó =

Spanish film director, producer, and scriptwriter

- Born: Pedro Masó Paulet; 26 January 1927; Madrid, Spain
- Died: 23 September 2008 (aged 81); Madrid, Spain

Pedro Masó Paulet (born 26 January 1927 in Madrid; died 23 September 2008 in Madrid) was a Spanish director, producer, and scriptwriter.

His relation with the cinema began at an early age when he was employed as a boy in the Estudios Chamartín in Madrid. There he performed many jobs, until he was made chief of production in 1953.

In 1962 he founded his own production company, Pedro Masó Producciones Cinematográficas, with which he produced some of the biggest commercial successes of Spanish film, including Atraco a las tres, Vacaciones para Ivette, Un millón a la basura and La familia bien, gracias.

In 1986 he created the firm Escorpio Films as a branch of Pedro Maso Producciones and subsequently produced his first feature-length movie, entitled El Tesoro with direction by Antonio Mercero and based on the novel of Miguel Delibes.

From 1993 he directed and produced the series Compuesta y Sin Novio for the television station Antena 3, starring Lina Morgan and José Coronado.

== Selected filmography ==
- Las chicas de la Cruz Roja (1958)
- Television Stories (1965)
- La Coquito (1977)
