= Jesús Guzmán (actor) =

Spanish actor (1936–2023)

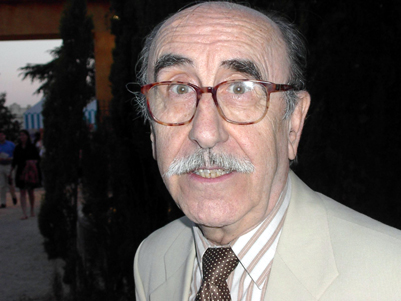
- Jesús Guzmán in 2002
- Born: Jesús Guzmán Gareta; 15 June 1926; Madrid, Spain
- Died: 16 October 2023 (aged 97); Madrid, Spain
- Occupation: Actor
- Spouse: Elena García Gil (m. 1951)
- Children: 4

Jesús Guzmán Gareta (15 June 1926 – 16 October 2023) was a Spanish actor, known for Death on High Mountain (1969) Crónicas de un pueblo (1971), Cachimba (2004) and Maestros (2000). He appeared in many western films shot in Almería such as Sartana Kills Them All (1970), For a Few Dollars More (1965), and Ocaso de un pistolero (1965).

Guzmán was the great-grandson of the actor Antonio Guzmán. He died on 16 October 2023, at the age of 97.

== Selected filmography ==
- Atraco a las tres (1962) as Cobrador de letras
- La gran familia (1962) as Conserje Ciudad Residencial
- Implacable Three (1963) as Tendero-funerario
- Como dos gotas de agua (1963) as Casimiro
- La historia de Bienvenido (1964) as Organillero
- For a Few Dollars More (1965) as Carpetbagger on Train (uncredited)
- The Good, the Bad and the Ugly (1966) as Pardue the Hotel Owner (uncredited)
- Good Morning, Little Countess (1967) as Etelemas
- The Locket (1970) as Curro
- Sartana Kills Them All (1970) as Storekeeper
- Crónicas de un pueblo (1971-1974) (89 TV episodes) as Braulio
- Nothing Less Than a Real Man (1972) as Notario
- And in the Third Year, He Rose Again (1980) as Alcalde de Rebollar de la Mata
- Maestros (2000)
- Cachimba (2004) as Don Artemio
