= Javier Bardem filmography =

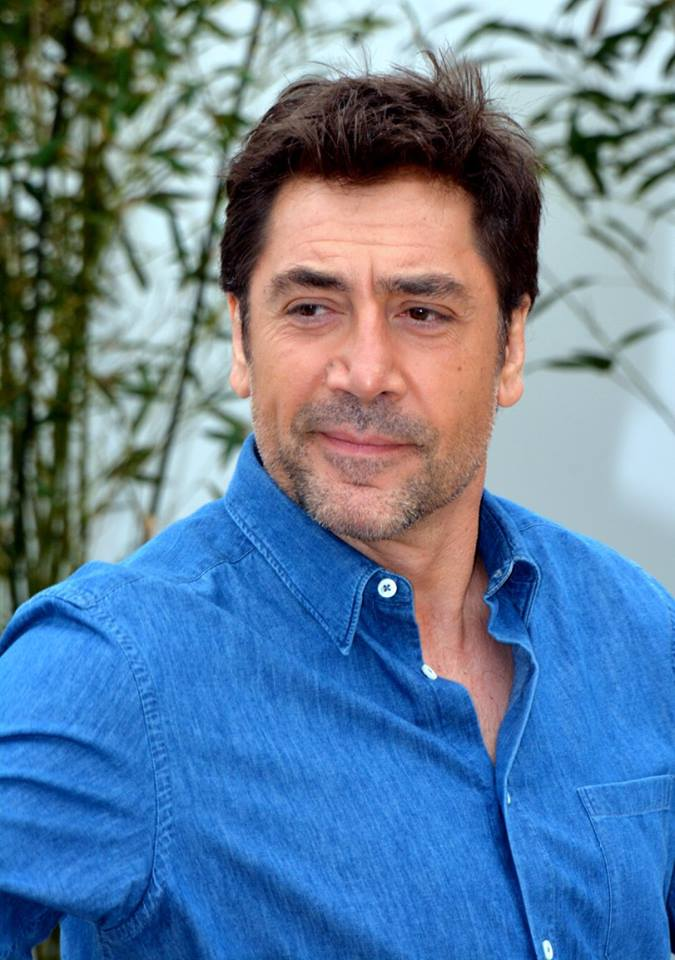
Bardem at the 2018 Cannes Film Festival

Javier Bardem is a Spanish actor and producer who made his acting debut as a child in an episode of the Spanish television series El Pícaro (1974). Bardem made his feature film debut with a minor role in the 1990 Spanish erotic film The Ages of Lulu. The film's director, Bigas Luna, was impressed by Bardem, giving him his first leading role in the romantic-comedy Jamón jamón (1992), alongside future wife Penélope Cruz. In 1993, Bardem starred in another Luna film, Golden Balls, and in the Vicente Aranda-directed The Bilingual Lover. The following year he appeared in Días contados and The Detective and Death (both in 1994). For both films, he was nominated at the San Sebastián International Film Festival Award for Best Actor.

His first leading role in an English-language film was as the jailed Cuban dissident Reinaldo Arenas in Before Night Falls (2000), for which he won the Volpi Cup for Best Actor and was nominated for the Academy Award for Best Actor. In 2002, he appeared in the John Malkovich-directed The Dancer Upstairs and the Fernando León de Aranoa-directed Mondays in the Sun. In 2004, he briefly appeared alongside Tom Cruise in the Michael Mann-directed Collateral. He won a second Volpi Cup for Best Actor in 2004, for portraying euthanasia activist Ramón Sampedro in The Sea Inside. His next role was as psychopathic assassin Anton Chigurh in the Coen brothers' film No Country for Old Men (2007), for which he received the Golden Globe Award for Best Supporting Actor – Motion Picture and Academy Award for Best Supporting Actor. He was the first Spanish actor to win an Oscar. Bardem next appeared in the 2008 Woody Allen film Vicky Cristina Barcelona, for which he was nominated for the Golden Globe Award for Best Actor in a Motion Picture – Musical or Comedy. He then starred in Biutiful (2010), garnering Bardem the Cannes Film Festival Award for Best Actor.

In 2012, Bardem narrated the Spanish documentary Sons of the Clouds, which he also producer. The film received a Goya Award for Best Documentary. That year, he also portrayed the Bond villain Raoul Silva in Skyfall (2012), which earned him a Satellite Award for Best Supporting Actor. The following year, he starred in the Ridley Scott-directed The Counselor (2013). Bardem then collaborated with Sean Penn on The Gunman (2015) and The Last Face (2016). In 2017, he played Armando Salazar in Pirates of the Caribbean: Dead Men Tell No Tales and starred in Mother!. He was nominated for a Golden Raspberry Award for Worst Supporting Actor for both performances. That year, he also portrayed Pablo Escobar in Loving Pablo opposite his wife Cruz. Bardem portrayed Stilgar in Dune (2021), his first science fiction film since Autómata (2014). That same year, Bardem portrayed Desi Arnaz in Being the Ricardos and his performance earned him another Academy Award nomination for Best Actor.

== Film ==
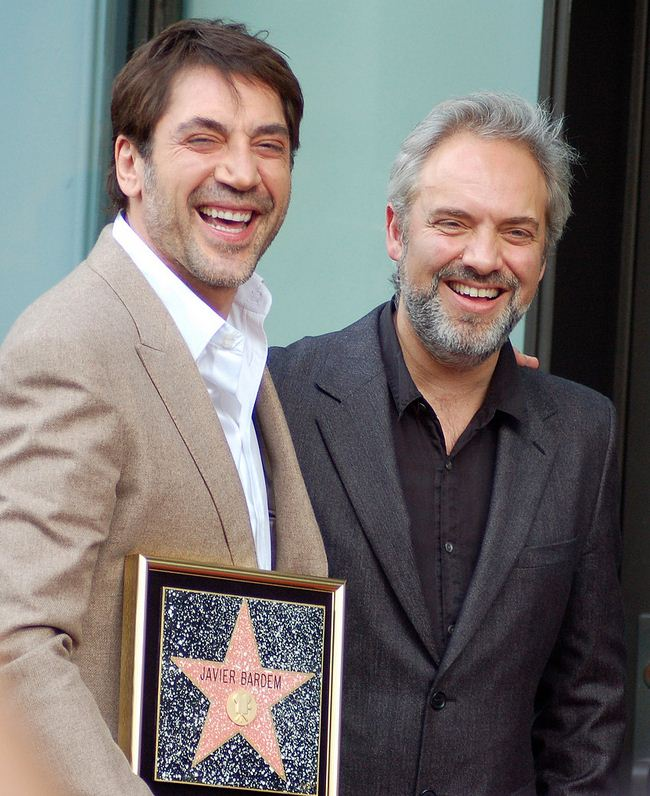
Bardem with Sam Mendes receiving a star on the Hollywood Walk of Fame in 2012

Year	Title	Role	Notes	Ref.
1990	The Ages of Lulu	Jimmy		
1991	High Heels	Regidor de TV		
1992	Amo tu cama rica	Antonio		
1992	Jamón jamón	Raúl		
1993	Huidos	Rafael		
1993	Golden Balls	Benito González	Also credited as singer on the film's soundtrack	
1993	The Bilingual Lover	Shoeshiner		
1994	Días contados	Lisardo		
1994	The Detective and Death	Detective Cornelio		
1995	Boca a boca	Víctor Ventura	Also credited as singer on the film's soundtrack	
1996	Not Love, Just Frenzy		Uncredited	
1997	Love Can Seriously Damage Your Health	Camillero		
1997	Airbag	José Alberto		
1997	Live Flesh	David		
1997	Perdita Durango	Romeo Dolorosa		
1998	Torrente, the Dumb Arm of the Law	Sultán		
1999	Between Your Legs	Javier		
1999	Second Skin	Diego		
1999	Washington Wolves	Alberto	Also executive producer	
2000	Before Night Falls	Reinaldo Arenas		
2001	Don't Tempt Me	Tony Graco		
2002	The Dancer Upstairs	Agustín Rejas		
2002	Mondays in the Sun	Santa		
2004	Collateral	Felix Reyes-Torrena		
2004	The Sea Inside	Ramón Sampedro		
2006	Goya's Ghosts	Brother Lorenzo		
2007	Love in the Time of Cholera	Florentino Ariza		
2007	No Country for Old Men	Anton Chigurh		
2008	Vicky Cristina Barcelona	Juan Antonio Gonzalo		
2010	Biutiful	Uxbal		
2010	Eat Pray Love	Felipe		
2012	Sons of the Clouds	Narrator	Voice; also producer	
2012	Skyfall	Raoul Silva		
2012	To the Wonder	Father Quintana		
2013	The Counselor	Reiner		
2013	Scorpion in Love	Solís		
2014	Autómata	Blue Robot	Voice	
2015	The Gunman	Felix Marti		
2016	The Last Face	Miguel León		
2017	Pirates of the Caribbean: Dead Men Tell No Tales	Armando Salazar		
2017	Mother!	Him		
2017	Loving Pablo	Pablo Escobar	Also producer	
2018	Thy Kingdom Come	Father Quintana	Documentary short; also producer	
2018	Everybody Knows	Paco		
2019	Sanctuary	Himself	Also producer	
2020	The Roads Not Taken	Leo		
2021	Dune	Stilgar		
2021	The Good Boss	Blanco		
2021	Being the Ricardos	Desi Arnaz		
2022	Lyle, Lyle, Crocodile	Hector P. Valenti		
2023	The Little Mermaid	King Triton		
2024	Dune: Part Two	Stilgar		
2024	Spellbound	King Solon	Voice	
2025	F1	Rubén Cervantes		
2026	Iron Maiden: Burning Ambition	Himself	Documentary	
2026	The Beloved	Esteban Martínez		
2026	Bunker	Miguel Moreno		
2026	Dune: Part Three †	Stilgar	Post-production	
TBA	Hello & Paris †	TBA	Post-production	
TBA	The Turning Door †	TBA	Filming (voice)	

Key
†	Denotes films that have not yet been released

== Television ==
Year	Title	Role	Notes	Ref.
1974	El Pícaro		Acting debut	
1986	Segunda enseñanza	Pablo	Recurring role	
1991	El C.I.D.	Vince	Episode: "Thursday's Child"	
2018	Asesinato en el Hormiguero Express	Himself	Television special	
2020	Home Movie: The Princess Bride	Inigo Montoya	Episode: "Chapter Ten: To the Pain!"	
2024	Monsters: The Lyle and Erik Menendez Story	José Menendez	Main role; also executive producer	
2025	Conan O'Brien Must Go	Himself	Episode: "Spain"	
2026	Cape Fear	Max Cady	Miniseries; also executive producer	

== See also ==
- List of awards and nominations received by Javier Bardem
