= List of awards and nominations received by Javier Bardem =

Javier Bardem awards and nominations
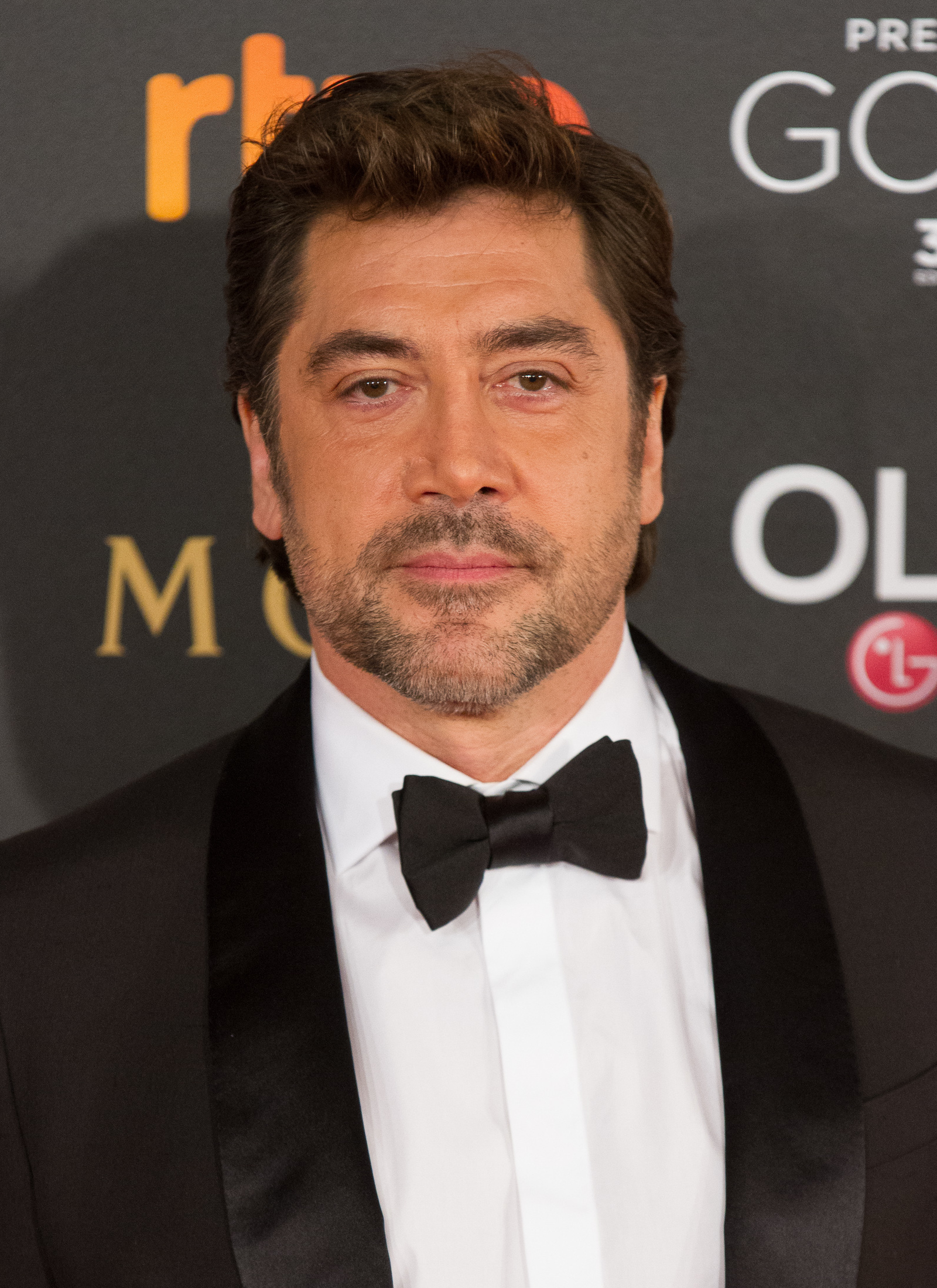
- Bardem at the 2018 Goya Awards
Awards and nominations
Award	Wins	Nominations
Academy Awards	1	4
BAFTA Awards	1	3
Emmy Awards	0	2
Golden Globes	1	6
SAG Awards	2	5

Totals (Note: Certain award groups do not simply award one winner. They acknowledge several different recipients, have runners-up, and have third place. Since this is a specific recognition and is different from losing an award, runner-up mentions are considered wins in this award tally. For simplification and to avoid errors, each award in this list has been presumed to have had a prior nomination.)
- Wins: 20
- Nominations: 51

The following is a list of awards and nominations received by Javier Bardem.

Javier Bardem is a Spanish actor. Over his career he has received several awards including an Academy Award, a British Academy Film Award, a Critics' Choice Movie Award, a Golden Globe Award, seven Goya Awards, and two Screen Actors Guild Award as well as a nomination for a Primetime Emmy Award. Bardem has also won prizes from both the Cannes Film Festival and the Venice International Film Festival.

Bardem started his career in Spanish cinema and took early roles in the thriller Running Out of Time (1995) and the sex comedy Mouth to Mouth (1996) winning the Goya Awards for Best Supporting Actor and Best Actor, respectively. He gained international attention for portraying Reinaldo Arenas in the biographical drama Before Night Falls (2000) winning the Volpi Cup for Best Actor and the Independent Spirit Award for Best Male Lead as well as nominations for the Academy Award and Golden Globe Award for Best Actor. He starred in the Spanish drama Mondays in the Sun (2002) and psychological drama The Sea Inside (2005) earning further Goya Awards and for the later the Volpi Cup for Best Actor.

He portrayed the villainous Anton Chigurh in the Joel and Ethan Coen modern western thriller No Country for Old Men (2007) for which he won widespread acclaim as well as the Academy Award, the BAFTA Award, the Golden Globe Award, and the Screen Actors Guild Award for Best Supporting Actor. He played a charismatic artist in the Woody Allen romance Vicky Cristina Barcelona (2008) for which he was nominated for the Golden Globe Award for Best Actor in a Motion Picture – Musical or Comedy and the Independent Spirit Award for Best Male Lead. He played a criminal with cancer in Alejandro González Iñárritu's psychological drama Biutiful (2010) for which he earned the Cannes Film Festival Award for Best Actor as well as nominations for the Academy Award for Best Actor and the BAFTA Award for Best Actor in a Leading Role.

He played the James Bond villain Raoul Silva in the Sam Mendes directed film Skyfall (2012) earning a nomination for the BAFTA Award and the Screen Actors Guild Award for Best Supporting Actor. He played another villain, Captain Armando Salazar in the Disney action fantasy film Pirates of the Caribbean: Dead Men Tell No Tales (2017) earning a nomination for the Teen Choice Award for Choice Movie Villain. He played Desi Arnaz in the Aaron Sorkin showbiz comedy-drama Being the Ricardos (2021) for which he received nominations for the Academy Award, Golden Globe Award, and Screen Actors Guild Award. That same year, he won his seventh Goya Award for The Good Boss (2021). On television, he portrayed José Menendez in the Netflix anthology series Monsters: The Lyle and Erik Menendez Story (2024) earning a nominations for the Primetime Emmy Award, Golden Globe Award and Screen Actors Guild Award for Best Supporting Actor in a Limited Series or Anthology Series or Movie.

== Major associations ==
=== Academy Awards ===
Academy Awards
Year	Category	Nominated work	Result	Ref.
2001	Best Actor	Before Night Falls	Nominated	
2008	Best Supporting Actor	No Country for Old Men	Won	
2011	Best Actor	Biutiful	Nominated	
2022	Best Actor	Being the Ricardos	Nominated	

=== BAFTA Awards ===
Year	Category	Nominated work	Result	Ref.
British Academy Film Awards
2008	Best Actor in a Supporting Role	No Country for Old Men	Won	
2011	Best Actor in a Leading Role	Biutiful	Nominated	
2013	Best Actor in a Supporting Role	Skyfall	Nominated	

=== Critics' Choice Awards ===
Year	Category	Nominated work	Result	Ref.
Critics' Choice Movie Awards
2004	Best Actor	The Sea Inside	Nominated	
2007	Best Acting Ensemble	No Country for Old Men	Nominated	
2007	Best Supporting Actor	No Country for Old Men	Won	
2012	Best Supporting Actor	Skyfall	Nominated	

=== Emmy Awards ===
Year	Category	Nominated work	Result	Ref.
Primetime Emmy Awards
2025	Outstanding Limited or Anthology Series (as executive producer)	Monsters: The Lyle and Erik Menendez Story	Nominated	
2025	Outstanding Supporting Actor in a Limited or Anthology Series or Movie	Monsters: The Lyle and Erik Menendez Story	Nominated	

=== Golden Globe Awards ===
Golden Globe Awards
Year	Category	Nominated work	Result	Ref.
2001	Best Actor in a Motion Picture – Drama	Before Night Falls	Nominated	
2005	Best Actor in a Motion Picture – Drama	The Sea Inside	Nominated	
2008	Best Supporting Actor – Motion Picture	No Country for Old Men	Won	
2009	Best Actor in a Motion Picture – Musical or Comedy	Vicky Cristina Barcelona	Nominated	
2022	Best Actor in a Motion Picture – Drama	Being the Ricardos	Nominated	
2025	Best Supporting Actor – Series, Miniseries or Television Film	Monsters: The Lyle and Erik Menendez Story	Nominated	

=== Actor Awards ===
Actor Awards
Year	Category	Nominated work	Result	Ref.
2008	Outstanding Cast in a Motion Picture	No Country for Old Men	Won	
2008	Outstanding Actor in a Supporting Role	No Country for Old Men	Won	
2013	Outstanding Actor in a Supporting Role	Skyfall	Nominated	
2022	Outstanding Actor in a Leading Role	Being the Ricardos	Nominated	
2025	Outstanding Actor in a Miniseries or Television Movie	Monsters: The Lyle and Erik Menendez Story	Nominated	

=== Goya Awards ===
Goya Awards
Edition	Category	Nominated work	Result	Ref.
7th (1993)	Best Actor	Jamón jamón	Nominated	
8th (1994)	Best Actor	Golden Balls	Nominated	
9th (1995)	Best Supporting Actor	Días contados	Won	
10th (1996)	Best Actor	Mouth to Mouth	Won	
12th (1998)	Best Actor	Live Flesh	Nominated	
17th (2003)	Best Actor	Mondays in the Sun	Won	
19th (2005)	Best Actor	The Sea Inside	Won	
25th (2011)	Best Actor	Biutiful	Won	
27th (2013)	Best Documentary	Sons of the Clouds	Won	
32nd (2018)	Best Actor	Loving Pablo	Nominated	
33rd (2019)	Best Actor	Everybody Knows	Nominated	
36th (2022)	Best Actor	The Good Boss	Won	

== Competitive festival awards ==
=== Cannes Film Festival ===
Cannes Film Festival
Edition	Category	Nominated work	Result	Ref.
63rd (2010)	Best Actor (Note: Tied with Elio Germano for La nostra vita)	Biutiful	Won	

=== Venice International Film Festival ===
Venice Film Festival
Edition	Category	Nominated work	Result	Ref.
57th (2000)	Volpi Cup for Best Actor	Before Night Falls	Won	
61st (2004)	Volpi Cup for Best Actor	The Sea Inside	Won	

=== San Sebastián International Film Festival ===
San Sebastián International Film Festival
Edition	Category	Nominated work	Result	Ref.
42nd (1994)	Silver Shell for Best Actor	Running Out of Time & The Detective and Death	Won	

== Miscellaneous awards ==
Organizations	Year	Category	Work	Result	Ref.
Astra Midseason Movie Awards	2025	Best Supporting Actor	F1	Nominated	
European Film Awards	1997	People's Choice Award for Best Actor	—	Won	
European Film Awards	1998	Best Actor	Live Flesh	Nominated	
European Film Awards	2002	Best Actor	Mondays in the Sun	Nominated	
European Film Awards	2004	Best Actor	The Sea Inside	Won	
Independent Spirit Awards	2000	Best Male Lead	Before Night Falls	Won	
Independent Spirit Awards	2008	Best Male Lead	Vicky Cristina Barcelona	Nominated	
Razzie Awards	2017	Worst Supporting Actor	Mother! & Pirates of the Caribbean: Dead Men Tell No Tales	Nominated	
Rome Film Festival	2026	Lifetime Achievement Award	—N/a	Honoured	
Santa Barbara International Film Festival	2008	Montecito Award	No Country for Old Men	Honoured	
Santa Barbara International Film Festival	2022	Maltin Modern Master Award	Being the Ricardos	Won	
Teen Choice Awards	2012	Choice Movie Villain	Skyfall	Nominated	
Teen Choice Awards	2017	Choice Movie Villain	Pirates of the Caribbean: Dead Men Tell No Tales	Nominated	

== See also ==
- Javier Bardem filmography
