= Being the Ricardos (soundtrack) =

Being the Ricardos (Amazon Original Motion Picture Soundtrack)

Film score by Daniel Pemberton
- Released: December 17, 2021
- Recorded: 2021
- Genre: Film score
- Length: 57:08
- Label: Lakeshore
- Producer: Daniel Pemberton

Daniel Pemberton chronology
The Rescue (2021)	Being the Ricardos (2021)	The Bad Guys (2022)

Being the Ricardos (Amazon Original Motion Picture Soundtrack) is the soundtrack to the 2021 film Being the Ricardos directed by Aaron Sorkin, about the relationship between I Love Lucy stars Lucille Ball and Desi Arnaz, played by Nicole Kidman and Javier Bardem. The score composed by Daniel Pemberton was released by Lakeshore Records on December 17, 2021. It received a nomination at the 75th British Academy Film Awards for Best Original Music.

== Development ==
Daniel Pemberton composed the score after working with Sorkin in Steve Jobs (2015), Molly's Game (2017) and The Trial of the Chicago 7 (2020). Being the Ricardos was an unusual film for Pemberton, as the story set in the golden age of Hollywood, it needed a classical score, saying "A lot of the story is, in some ways, this dream of a perfect world, which Lucy’s searching for… the perfect home, a husband who is there [...] There is an element of nostalgia, not just looking back at these classic characters, but also a time when the identity of the country was quite different. I wanted to capture some of the wonder and the magic of that time period." Pemberton did not have any idea on the actors and the sitcom I Love Lucy, although watch few of the episodes on YouTube which felt "the show seemed to represent what was great about America, and how America saw itself".

After attending the 93rd Academy Awards on April 25, 2021, Pemberton wrote a 70-piece orchestra based on a single theme which had a "bittersweet melancholia and an element of aspiration and dream" as several contemporary filmmakers shy away from strong melodies and huge orchestral themes, and Pemberton felt it as a canvas to reintroduce the idea. He wrote 65 minutes of the music at his home due to the COVID-19 pandemic where he and Sorkin communicated through video conferencing and email.

He incorporated rhythmic ideas using conga drums and percussions but did not replicate the Arnaz nightclub sound or the "I Love Lucy" theme, as he wanted "a different way to represent the energy of that world, the writers, the pace, the tension of the show". Some of the challenges include the flashback sequences, which took him long time to get the tone and had re-scored the scene over 20 times, since "We have to see Lucy thinking, working things out, letting the audience understand the process she goes through". For the nightclub scenes and recreating the theme song, the film's music supervisor Mary Ramos brought source music specialist Michael Andrew, who said: "There was a magic sound to Desi Arnaz’s orchestra. The goal was to get the sound of that orchestra, not a recording of it. We had to create it from scratch.” He recruited two fellow arrangers to listen closely to the televised versions and supervised the orchestration, instrumentation and choir to get it right. Ramos also brought Santana conga player Walfredo Reyes Jr. who worked with Javier Bardem on playing congas for the scenes.

== Track listing ==
No.	Title	Length
1.	"The Start of a Dream"	0:50
2.	"One Scary Week"	3:40
3.	"Technically I'm a Communist"	2:32
4.	"Desilu Studios Arrival"	0:56
5.	"Table for Four, Chairs for Three"	1:12
6.	"The Balcony"	1:06
7.	"They Killed All the Animals"	1:54
8.	"Too Many Girls"	1:25
9.	"Playing Ethel"	0:42
10.	"Lucy Can See It"	3:11
11.	"You Don't Come Home Anymore"	1:05
12.	"Eloped"	0:39
13.	"Mulholland"	1:29
14.	"Send It By Telegram"	1:24
15.	"Flowers in a Vase"	1:06
16.	"I Got the Part"	1:04
17.	"RKO Pictures"	1:28
18.	"Reading Scripts, Drunk"	2:29
19.	"It Needs to Be Fixed"	1:44
20.	"Save My Marriage"	0:55
21.	"Female Perspective"	1:48
22.	"A Priest, a Minister and a Rabbi"	1:25
23.	"Finding the Handkerchief"	1:51
24.	"Articulate"	0:43
25.	"Biggest Asset"	1:55
26.	"Television Offer"	0:46
27.	"The Evening Editions"	4:52
28.	"I Care About You"	2:55
29.	"The Star, Lucille Ball"	2:38
30.	"Roll Sound, Action"	2:18
31.	"The End of a Dream"	5:06
Total length:		57:08

== Reception ==
Jason Bailey of Vulture called the score as "hoary" and "obvious". Justin Chang of Los Angeles Times and Pete Hammond of Deadline Hollywood called the score as "rapid" and "lovely". Patrick Gibbs of Slug Magazine wrote "The score by Daniel Pemberton has some great moments, but some of the cues are a bit too melodramatic".

== Accolades ==
Pemberton's score was shortlisted for Academy Award for Best Original Score at the 94th Academy Awards, but was not nominated.

Award	Date of ceremony	Category	Recipients	Results	Ref.
BAFTA Awards	March 13, 2022	Best Original Music	Daniel Pemberton	Nominated	
