= Remington Model 11-96 =

- Type: Semi-automatic shotgun
- Place of origin: United States

Production history
- Manufacturer: Remington Arms
- Unit cost: $862 at introduction
- Produced: 1996–1999

Specifications
- Mass: 7 lb 5 oz (3.3 kg) (28")
- Length: 48 1/4 in (123 cm) (28")
- Barrel length: 26 or 28 in (66 or 71 cm)
- Cartridge: 12 gauge (2 3/4" or 3")
- Action: Semi-automatic gas-operated
- Feed system: Tube magazine 3+1 rounds
- Sights: Front brass bead

The Remington Model 11-96, also known as the Euro Lightweight, is a gas-operated semi-automatic shotgun produced from 1996 to 1999 by Remington Arms. It was named 1997 shotgun of the year by Shooting Industry magazine.

The Model 11-96 was a lightened version of the Model 11-87. It was available only in 12 gauge, accepting 2 3/4-inch (7.0 cm) or 3-inch (7.6 cm) shells. It was shipped with three choke tubes.
