= Remington Model 11-87 =

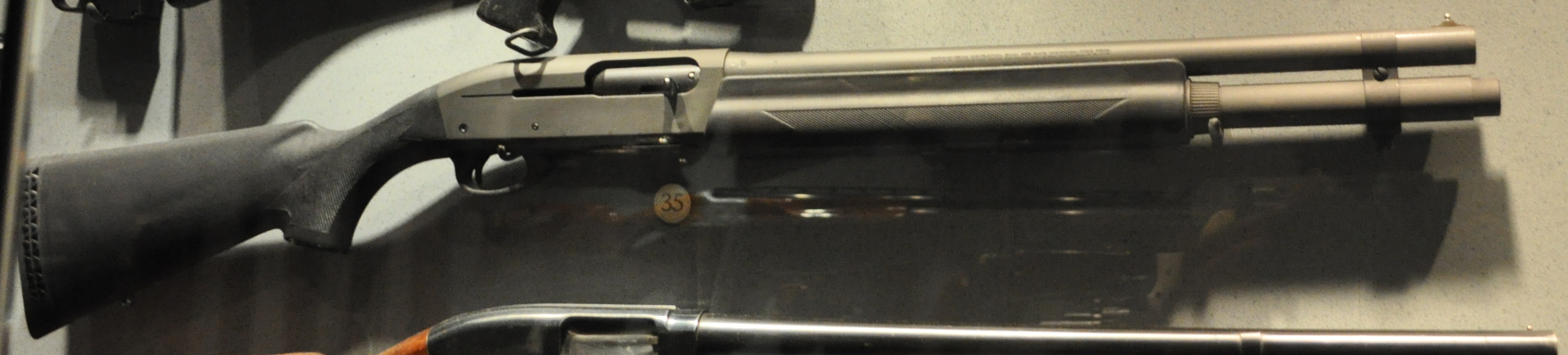
- A Model 11-87 with extended magazine
- Type: Semi-automatic shotgun
- Place of origin: United States

Service history
- Used by: See Users

Production history
- Designer: Wayne Leek (Model 1100)
- Manufacturer: Remington Arms
- Produced: 1987–2020

Specifications
- Mass: 8.25 lb (3.7 kg) with 28 in (710 mm) barrel
- Length: 34 to 50 in (860 to 1,270 mm)
- Barrel length: 14 to 30 in (360 to 760 mm)
- Cartridge: 12 or 20 gauge
- Action: Semi-automatic gas-operated
- Feed system: Tube magazine 4+1 rounds; 7+1 rounds with magazine extension

The Remington Model 11-87 is a semi-automatic shotgun manufactured by Remington Arms and based on the earlier Model 1100. Remington introduced the Model 11–87 in 1987 and ceased production of it in 2020.

== Design ==
The Model 11-87 is a gas operated semi-automatic shotgun. Upon firing a shell, some of the high-pressure gases from the burning propellant are diverted through two small holes under the barrel, forcing the bolt toward the buttstock, which in turn ejects the spent shell. A spring then forces the bolt forward, sending a new shell from the magazine into the chamber. This gas operation has the effect of reducing the recoil felt by the shooter, since the total recoil energy is spread out over a longer period of time than would be the case with fixed-breech shotguns.

The Model 11-87 incorporates a self-compensating gas system design, which allows the gun to operate with a range of loads, from light 2 3/4-inch (7.0 cm) shells to 3-inch (7.6 cm) Magnum shells, without any adjustment by the operator. It is manufactured in 12 gauge and 20 gauge; both will cycle 2 3/4-inch and 3-inch shells.

A lightened version of the Model 11-87, the Model 11-96, was offered in the late 1990s in 12 gauge only.

== Operation ==
Some Model 11-87 shotguns, especially those with barrels shorter than 26 inches (66 cm), or Magnum models, may have issues cycling light target and birdshot loads consistently.

A 12 gauge model that accepts 3 1/2-inch (8.9 cm) shells is marketed as the Super Magnum. This model comes with an extra component on the magazine tube called a "barrel seal activator" that helps cycle lighter loads. The barrel seal activator is meant to be removed when using 3 1/2-inch or 3-inch shells, and installed when using shorter shells.

Some Model 11-87s have interchangeable screw-in chokes; other barrels are available with fixed chokes. Barrels are not interchangeable between the Model 1100 and Model 11-87. Barrel lengths range from 14 inches (36 cm) (for use by law enforcement) to 30 inches (76 cm).

== In popular culture ==
The weapon found widespread notoriety when a sound-suppressed version of it was used by Anton Chigurh in the Coen brothers' film No Country for Old Men, based on the novel by Cormac McCarthy. First developed in 1987, this weapon is an anachronism to the movie's storyline, set 1980.

== Users ==
- United States: Used by numerous law enforcement agencies.
