= Boiro =

Coordinates: 42.650°N 8.900°W

Concello de Boiro
- municipality
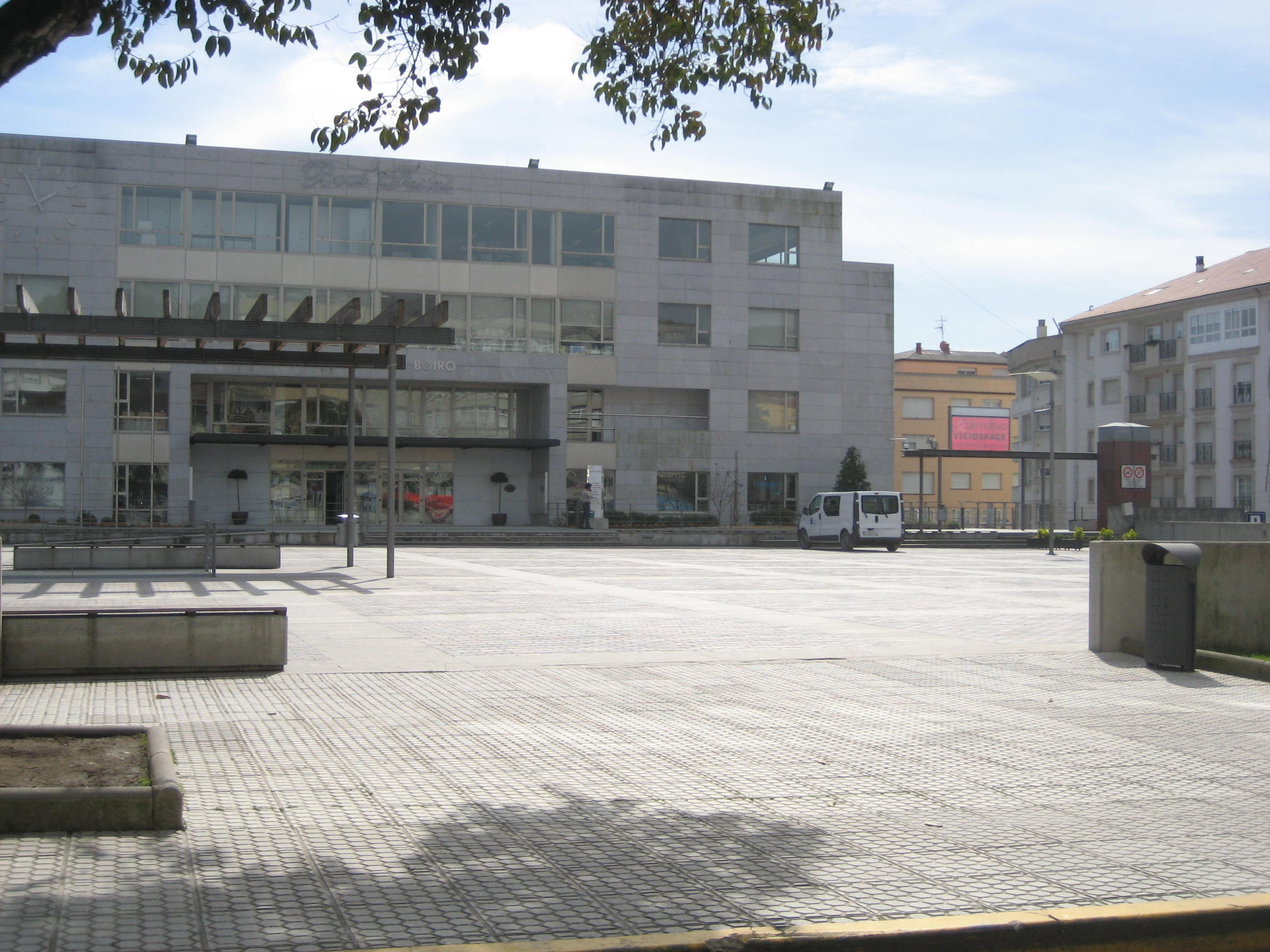

- Coat of arms
- Nickname: Boiro
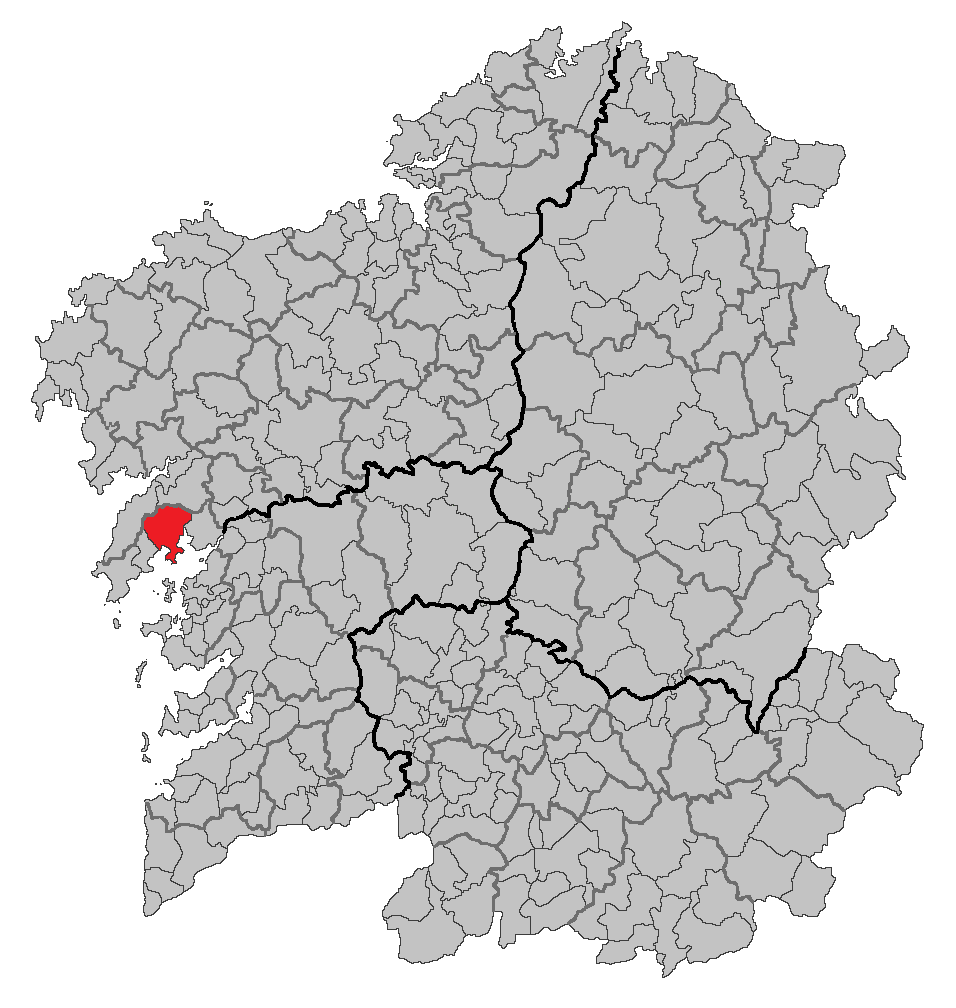
- Location of Boiro within Galicia
- Parroquias: 8

Government
  - Alcalde (Mayor): Xosé Deira Triñanes (BNG)

Area
  - Total: 86 km^{2} (33 sq mi)

Population (2025-01-01)
  - Total: 18,967
- Time zone: UTC+1 (CET)
  - Summer (DST): UTC+2 (CEST)
- Website: Concello de Boiro website

Boiro is a municipality in the province of A Coruña in the autonomous community of Galicia in northwestern Spain. It is located in the comarca of Barbanza. Boiro has an area of 86.58 km^{2}.

Boiro was where the controversial assisted suicide of quadriplegic Ramón Sampedro took place. The town was later used as a setting for the 2004 film Mar Adentro, chronicling Sampedro's later life.

Boiro is also well known for local tourists that come from inner Spain to enjoy the milder climate and landscape, most notably the Barbanza mountain chain, Praia de Barraña (which lies close to the town center), and Carragueiros and Mañóns beaches (one in O Castro parish and the other in Abanqueiro parish).

== See also ==
List of municipalities in A Coruña
