= Being the Ricardos =

2021 film by Aaron Sorkin

- Promotional release poster
- Directed by: Aaron Sorkin
- Written by: Aaron Sorkin
- Produced by: Todd Black; Jason Blumenthal; Steve Tisch
- Starring: Nicole Kidman; Javier Bardem; J. K. Simmons; Nina Arianda; Tony Hale; Alia Shawkat; Jake Lacy; Clark Gregg
- Cinematography: Jeff Cronenweth
- Edited by: Alan Baumgarten
- Music by: Daniel Pemberton
- Production companies: Amazon Studios; Escape Artists; Big Indie Pictures
- Distributed by: Amazon Studios
- Release dates: December 7, 2021 (New York City); December 10, 2021 (United States)
- Running time: 131 minutes
- Country: United States
- Language: English

Being the Ricardos is a 2021 American biographical drama film written and directed by Aaron Sorkin, about the relationship between I Love Lucy stars Lucille Ball and Desi Arnaz. Nicole Kidman and Javier Bardem star as Ball and Arnaz, while J. K. Simmons, Nina Arianda, Tony Hale, Alia Shawkat, Jake Lacy, and Clark Gregg are featured in supporting roles.

It received a limited theatrical release by Amazon Studios in the United States on December 10, 2021, prior to streaming worldwide on Prime Video on December 21, 2021. The film received generally positive reviews from critics who praised the performances of the cast, particularly those of Kidman and Bardem. The film received three nominations at the 94th Academy Awards: Best Actor for Bardem, Best Actress for Kidman and Best Supporting Actor for Simmons. It also received three nominations at the 79th Golden Globe Awards including Best Actor – Motion Picture Drama for Bardem and Best Screenplay for Sorkin, with Kidman winning Best Actress – Motion Picture Drama.

== Plot ==
The film is told from three perspectives: "present-day" interviews with I Love Lucy's lead writers Jess Oppenheimer, Madelyn Pugh, and Bob Carroll Jr.; flashbacks throughout Lucille Ball and Desi Arnaz's relationship; and preparations for filming an episode of the show in 1953.

In 1939, Ball is an actress contracted to RKO Pictures, earning the moniker "Queen of the B-Movies". Cast in the failed comedy Too Many Girls, she falls in love with her costar, Cuban singer Arnaz. He assures her of her talent as a comedian, and she confides her dream of simply making a home with someone. They marry and buy a house in Hollywood, but struggle to spend time together, with Arnaz busy fronting his Desi Arnaz Orchestra while Ball continues her film career with little success.

After serving in World War II, Arnaz resumes touring with his orchestra, and Ball lands a starring role in 1942's The Big Street. She meets with RKO President Charles Koerner, expecting to become an established star like Rita Hayworth and Judy Holliday. Instead, he terminates her contract, largely due to her age, and suggests she use her voice for radio. In 1948, she is cast in the radio show My Favorite Husband, which becomes a massive success.

CBS suggests turning My Favorite Husband into a television show, sponsored by cigarette company Philip Morris. Hoping to bring her and Arnaz closer together, Ball agrees on the condition that he plays her on-screen husband; the executives initially refuse to have an "all-American" star with a Cuban husband, but are forced to concede. By 1951, the show is renamed I Love Lucy and becomes a smash hit with nearly 60 million viewers each week.

Ball and Arnaz produce the show in Los Angeles through their company Desilu Productions, with a three-camera system designed by Arnaz allowing East Coast viewers to watch live without static, while accommodating a studio audience. Dealing with friction between her costars William Frawley, who is often drunk, and Vivian Vance, who resents Ball's attempts to make her less attractive, Ball clashes with the directors and writers over her exacting demands.

Walter Winchell's radio program claims to have evidence of Ball's Communist ties, alarming I Love Lucy's crew that their show will be shut down. Ball admits to registering with the party when she was young and influenced by a relative, and Arnaz frustrates her by announcing that she innocently marked the wrong box. They inform the writers she is pregnant with their second child, planning to integrate this into future episodes, but executives refuse to allow even the word "pregnant" on the air.

Ball confronts her husband for often staying out late, but he proves that a tabloid photo of him with another woman was taken months ago. After Frawley suggests that Arnaz's behavior stems from feeling emasculated by Ball taking over many of the show's business and creative decisions, she asks Oppenheimer, the official showrunner, to help save her marriage. Instead of offering him a producer credit, Oppenheimer assures Arnaz he has top billing as the "I" in I Love Lucy, but he rejects the patronizing gesture. Arnaz reaches out to the head of Philip Morris directly, securing permission to introduce Ball's pregnancy into the show.

The night of filming a new episode, a newspaper article declares Ball a Communist, though she was cleared during an HUAC hearing. Arnaz addresses the studio audience about the accusations and takes a live call with FBI Director J. Edgar Hoover, who confirms that Lucy was cleared of all charges. Celebrating backstage, Ball confronts Arnaz with a lipstick-stained handkerchief, which he claims is hers, but she shows him another handkerchief with her own lipstick, and he finally admits to his infidelity.

As filming begins, Ball momentarily loses her concentration, triggered by Arnaz's catchphrase — "Lucy, I'm home". An epilogue reveals that Ball filed for divorce after the taping of their last show in 1960.

== Cast ==
- Nicole Kidman as Lucille Ball
- Javier Bardem as Desi Arnaz
- J. K. Simmons as William Frawley
- Nina Arianda as Vivian Vance
- Tony Hale as Jess Oppenheimer
  - John Rubinstein as older Jess Oppenheimer
- Alia Shawkat as Madelyn Pugh
  - Linda Lavin as older Madelyn Pugh
- Jake Lacy as Bob Carroll Jr.
  - Ronny Cox as older Bob Carroll
- Clark Gregg as Howard Wenke
- Nelson Franklin as Joe Strickland
- Jeff Holman as Roger Otter
- Jonah Platt as Tip Tribby
- Christopher Denham as Donald Glass
- Brian Howe as Charles Koerner
- Ron Perkins as Macy

== Production ==
=== Development ===
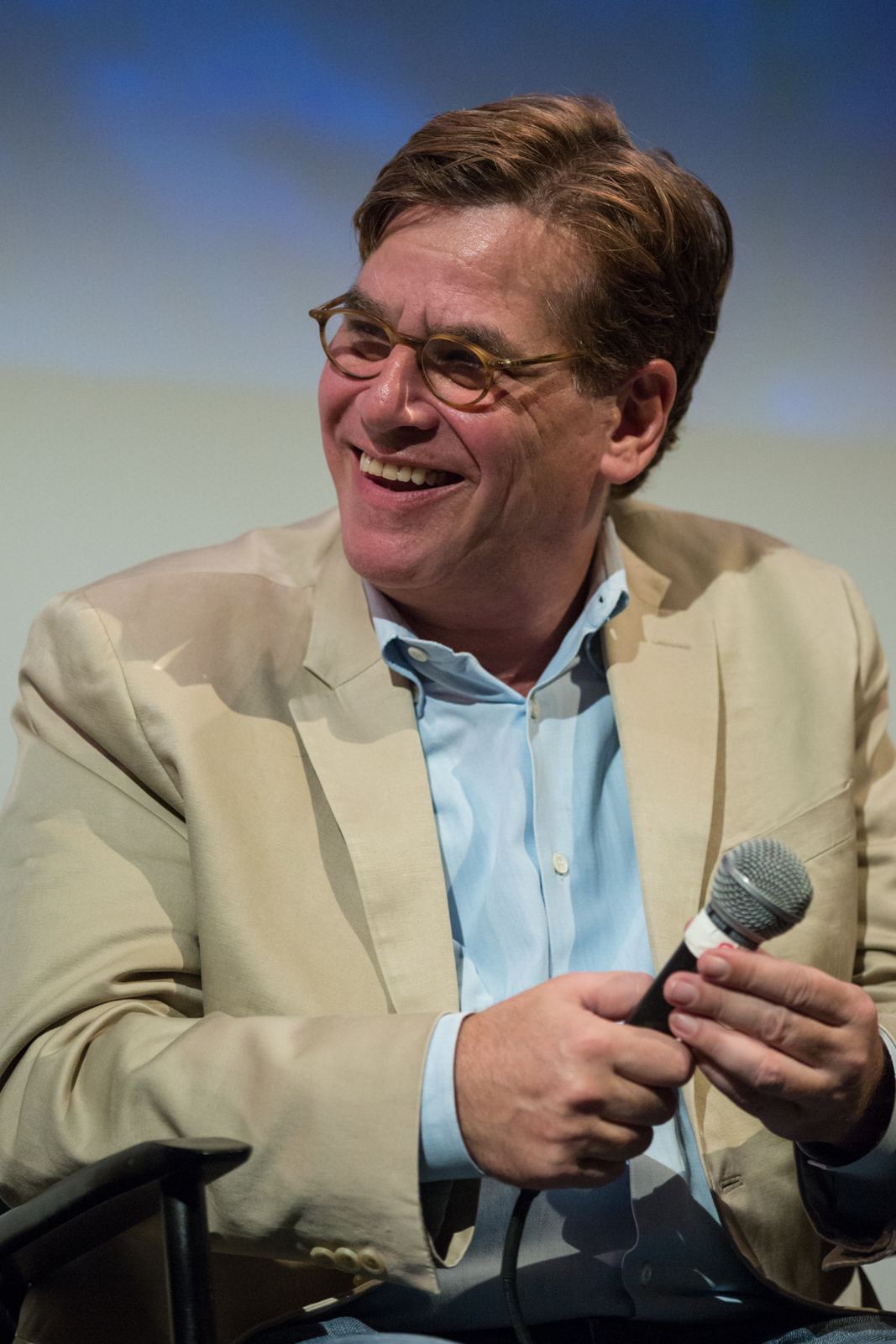
Aaron Sorkin, the film's writer and director

The project was first announced in September 2015, with Cate Blanchett announced to star as Lucille Ball and Aaron Sorkin writing the screenplay. The film was acquired by Amazon Studios in August 2017.

Production was originally given a tax credit to film in California in November 2019, and producers were revealed to be meeting with directors in January 2020. However, by January 2021, Blanchett had dropped out of the project, with Nicole Kidman in negotiations to replace her and Javier Bardem in negotiations to portray Desi Arnaz. Sorkin, having enjoyed the experience of directing The Trial of the Chicago 7, had elected to serve as director himself. The casting of Kidman was met with some controversy on social media, but Lucie Arnaz spoke out in defense of Kidman's casting. In February, J. K. Simmons and Nina Arianda were cast to portray William Frawley and Vivian Vance respectively.

=== Filming ===
Filming began on March 29, 2021, in Los Angeles, with Tony Hale, Alia Shawkat, Jake Lacy, and Clark Gregg added to the cast. The production canceled filming at Chateau Marmont due to backlash against the establishment. In September 2021, the film was in post-production. The set design was led by Emmy-nominated set decorator Ellen Brill and production designer Jon Hutman. Daniel Pemberton composed the film score, which was released by Lakeshore Records on December 17, 2021.

== Release ==
The film premiered in New York City and Los Angeles on December 2, 2021, and December 6, 2021, respectively. It was released in a limited release exclusively in the United States on December 10, 2021, before streaming globally on Prime Video on December 21, 2021.

Though Amazon does not publicly release box office grosses, the film made an estimated $150,000 from 450 theaters on its first day, and a total of $450,000 in its opening weekend.

== Reception ==
=== Critical response ===
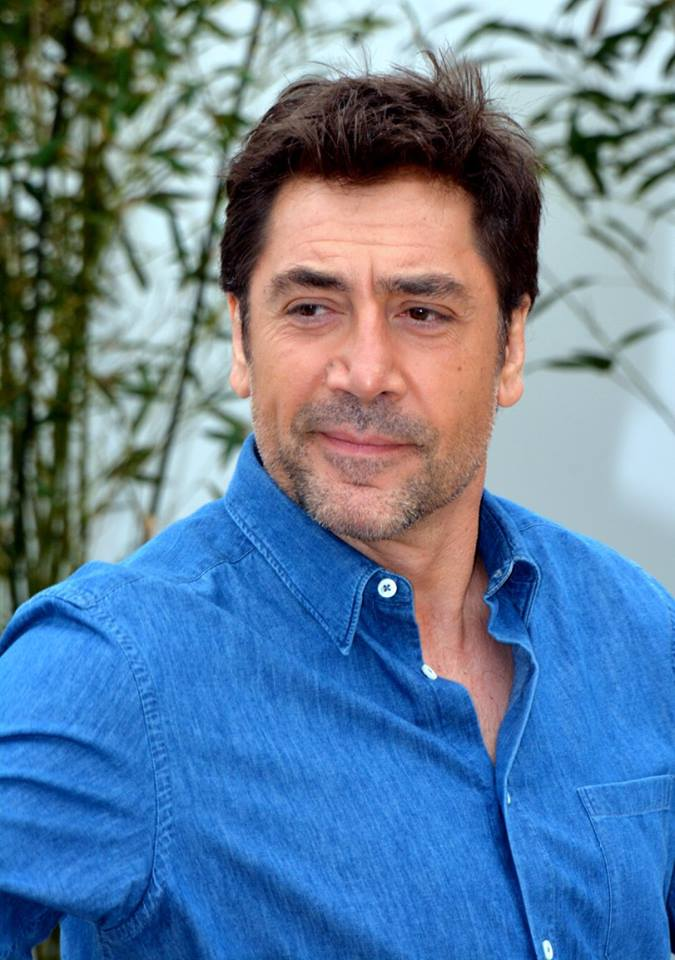
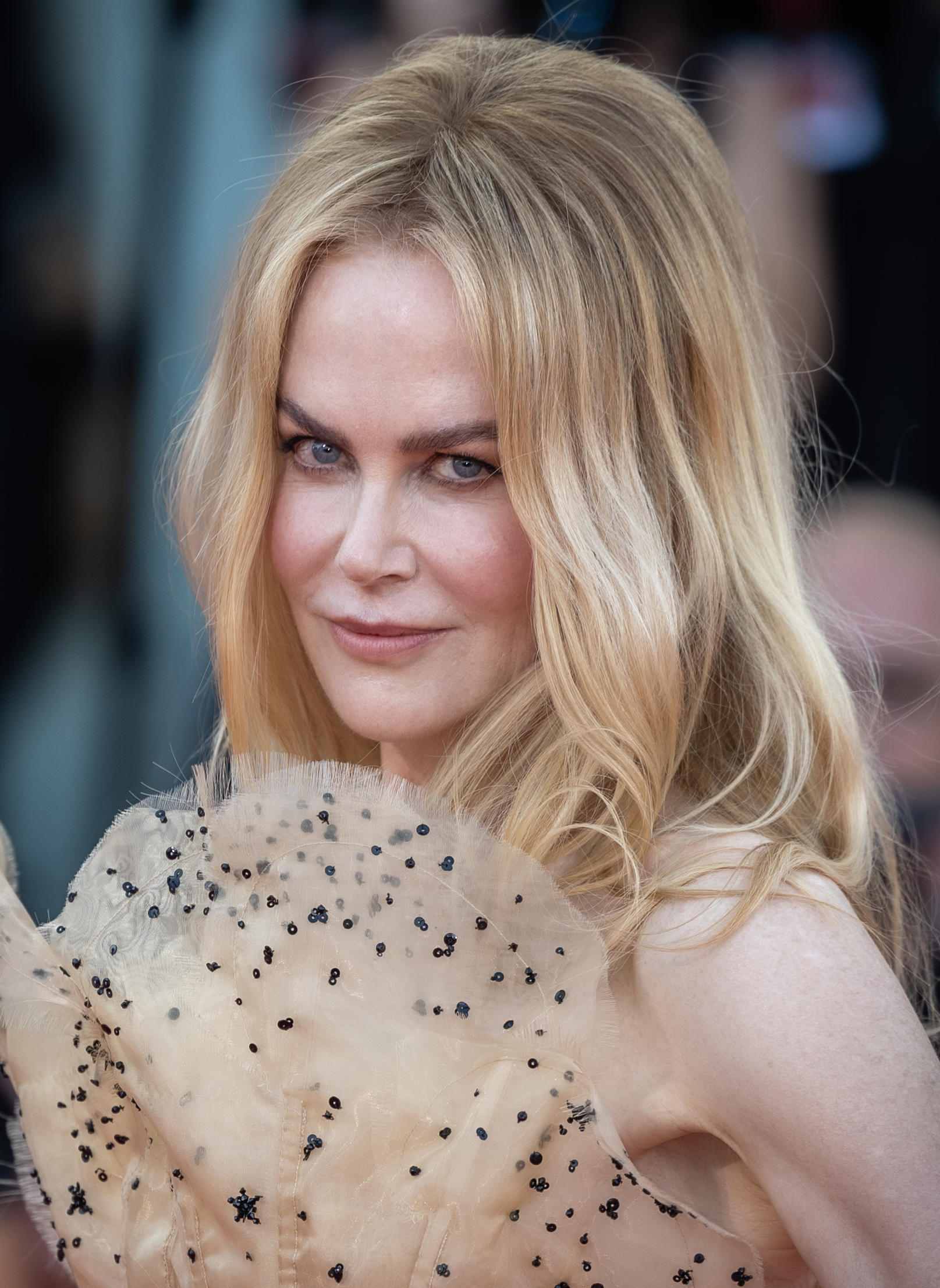
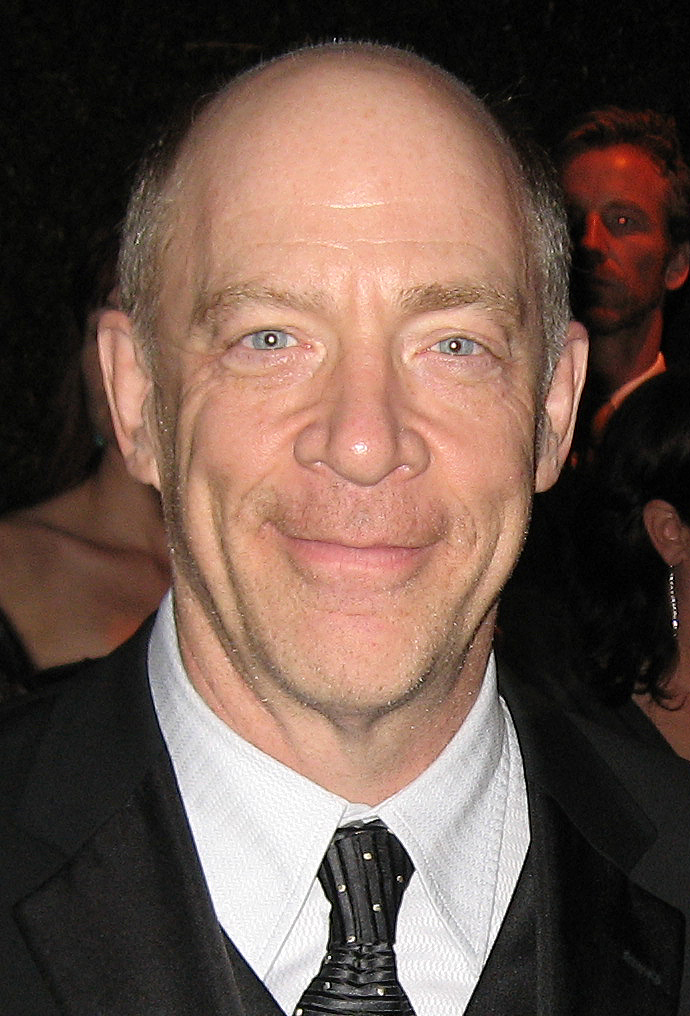
Javier Bardem, Nicole Kidman, and J.K. Simmons received Academy Award nominations for Best Actor, Best Actress, and Best Supporting Actor for their performances.

The review aggregation website Rotten Tomatoes reports an approval rating of 68% based on 281 reviews, with an average rating of 6.6/10. The website's critics consensus reads: "Being the Ricardos can't hope to truly capture its subjects' brilliant star power, but Nicole Kidman has a ball with Aaron Sorkin's spitfire dialogue." Metacritic gave the film a weighted average score of 60 out of 100, based on 51 critics, indicating "mixed or average" reviews.

Richard Roeper of the Chicago Sun-Times gave the film a three and a half out of four stars, and pointed out how, despite unfavorable reactions in response to the casting of Kidman and Bardem in the lead roles, "Bardem does a solid job of capturing Arnaz' charismatic stage presence, business acumen and duplicitous ways with the ladies, while Kidman is outstanding at reminding us there were two Lucys [...] It's not an impersonation so much as it is a fully realized characterization." Mark Feeney from The Boston Globe mentioned that Kidman gets "the smokiness of Ball's voice. And in the black-and-white that's used for scenes from the sitcom the physical resemblance is uncanny. It's Kidman playing one Lucy as that Lucy plays another", and mentioned how, although Bardem doesn't physically resemble his character, "that's not a problem, since what Bardem does convey, and it matters a lot more, is Arnaz's babalu gusto and coiled-spring alertness." Lindsey Bahr of the Associated Press stated that "while no one is going to mistake either Kidman or Bardem for either of their real-life counterparts, they were hired to be actors, not mimics and do a terrific job bringing to life the spirit of their characters off-camera lives, illustrating a full, complex, adult relationship."

Stephanie Zacharek from Time mentioned how "Kidman makes a fine Lucille Ball in many ways", such as when "capturing Ball's smarts", and continued on by saying that "Bardem is terrific as Arnaz, finding complexities in the man that we might not have known were there." David Rooney of The Hollywood Reporter stated that "the performances of Nicole Kidman and Javier Bardem as golden-age TV's best-loved couple can't be faulted", describing Bardem's performance as "oozing charisma" and showing "a roguish charm and a shrewd mind" as Arnaz. He also reiterated that despite Kidman not physically resembling Ball, "she plays the laser-focused professionalism and self-preservation with stirring conviction, and she nails the dual on- and off-camera personae in her movements, and above all, in vocal distinctions between the raspy heavy smoker in the writers' room and the squawking comic on TV."

Filmmaker Gary Ross praised the film, saying "The period is impeccably rendered, the performances are dazzling ... The script sparkles, and darts and dashes as Aaron's always do. His collaboration with cinematographer Jeff Cronenweth and production designer Jon Hutman is a beautiful tone poem that underscores the subtext of the piece."

=== Controversies ===
Reception of the casting of a European actor (Bardem) to play a Cuban-American character (Arnaz) was more negative, with reporter Laura Bradley noting that "Hollywood has a well-established history of hiring Spanish actors to play characters from the countries the Spaniards colonized." Sorkin defended the casting decision by saying that "having an actor who was born in Spain playing a character who was born in Cuba was not demeaning. And it wasn't just the casting consultant who agreed, Lucy and Desi's Cuban-American daughter didn't have a problem with it. So, I'm very comfortable with it." A Cuban-American critic F. Lennox Campello noted wryly that "a Spaniard portraying a Santiaguero was gonna be an uneasy pill to swallow for that most clannish of people known as Cubans. Everyone in Hialeah was probably having a fit." Additionally, as a sign of the Hollywood view of Cubans, some Spanish-language media accused the film of having Bardem "darken" his skin to appear "more Cuban", when in fact Arnaz was lighter-skinned than Bardem. It was also pointed out that it was the second time that Bardem has been cast to portray a Cuban (the first being a film about Cuban writer Reinaldo Arenas). A major newspaper in Spain accused Bardem of "cultural appropriation" while also noting that Arnaz was "a direct descendant of families from Spain." On the other side of the casting controversy, a separate major Spanish newspaper endorsed the casting of Bardem as Arnaz, noting that Arnaz had "more in common with Bardem [lineage to Spain] than with any other Hispanic [non Spaniard] actor."

Additionally, it was also pointed out that one of the key principal tenets of the film – the point that in 1953 Arnaz had personal issues with Communism because his family had been "kicked out of Cuba because of Communism" – was incorrect, as the much later Cuban Revolution did not take over the island until 1959, and the Arnaz family had migrated to the United States in 1933 as a result of the "Revolt of the Sergeants".

Stu Shostak, the host of the podcast "Stu's Show" and a personal friend of Lucille Ball, had negative things to say about the movie. As someone who extensively studied vintage TV and interviewed many people who were involved with I Love Lucy, he expressed criticism at how the cast was portrayed, the factual inaccuracies of the script (J. Edgar Hoover never called on the set), and how the actors' relationships with each other were not as frosty (nor as chummy, in some situations) as they were portrayed in the film. Ultimately, he found the film to be a disgrace to Lucy and Desi's legacy, and hoped that people would "let them rest in peace" going forward.

=== Audience viewership ===
The film achieved significant success for Amazon, debuting at No. 1 on Prime Video during its opening weekend and becoming one of the top debuts for a movie drama release.

== Accolades ==
Award	Date of ceremony	Category	Recipients	Results	Ref.
AACTA International Awards	January 26, 2022	Best Film	Being the Ricardos	Nominated	
AACTA International Awards	January 26, 2022	Best Actress	Nicole Kidman	Won	
AACTA International Awards	January 26, 2022	Best Screenplay	Aaron Sorkin	Won	
AARP Movies for Grownups Awards	March 18, 2022	Best Actress	Nicole Kidman	Won	
Academy Awards	March 27, 2022	Best Actor	Javier Bardem	Nominated	
Academy Awards	March 27, 2022	Best Actress	Nicole Kidman	Nominated	
Academy Awards	March 27, 2022	Best Supporting Actor	J. K. Simmons	Nominated	
Actors and Actresses Union Awards	March 13, 2023	Best Actor in an International Production	Javier Bardem	Won	
BAFTA Awards	March 13, 2022	Best Original Screenplay	Aaron Sorkin	Nominated	
BAFTA Awards	March 13, 2022	Best Original Music	Daniel Pemberton	Nominated	
Critics' Choice Movie Awards	March 13, 2022	Best Actress	Nicole Kidman	Nominated	
Critics' Choice Movie Awards	March 13, 2022	Best Supporting Actor	J. K. Simmons	Nominated	
Critics' Choice Movie Awards	March 13, 2022	Best Original Screenplay	Aaron Sorkin	Nominated	
Detroit Film Critics Society	December 6, 2021	Best Actress	Nicole Kidman	Nominated	
Golden Globe Awards	January 9, 2022	Best Actor – Motion Picture Drama	Javier Bardem	Nominated	
Golden Globe Awards	January 9, 2022	Best Actress – Motion Picture Drama	Nicole Kidman	Won	
Golden Globe Awards	January 9, 2022	Best Screenplay	Aaron Sorkin	Nominated	
Hollywood Critics Association Awards	February 28, 2022	Best Picture	Being the Ricardos	Nominated	
Hollywood Critics Association Awards	February 28, 2022	Best Actress	Nicole Kidman	Nominated	
Hollywood Critics Association Awards	February 28, 2022	Best Original Screenplay	Aaron Sorkin	Nominated	
Hollywood Critics Association Awards	February 28, 2022	Best Hair and Makeup	Ana Lozano, David Craig Forrest, Kim Santantonio, Kyra Panchenko, Michael Ornelaz, Teressa Hill and Yvonne DePatis Kupka	Nominated	
Houston Film Critics Society	January 19, 2022	Best Supporting Actor	J. K. Simmons	Nominated	
Producers Guild of America Awards	March 19, 2022	Best Theatrical Motion Picture	Todd Black	Nominated	
Satellite Awards	April 2, 2022	Best Actress	Nicole Kidman	Nominated	
Satellite Awards	April 2, 2022	Best Supporting Actor	J. K. Simmons	Nominated	
Screen Actors Guild Awards	February 27, 2022	Outstanding Performance by a Male Actor in a Leading Role	Javier Bardem	Nominated	
Screen Actors Guild Awards	February 27, 2022	Outstanding Performance by a Female Actor in a Leading Role	Nicole Kidman	Nominated	
Set Decorators Society of America Awards	February 22, 2021	Best Achievement in Décor/Design of a Period Feature Film	Ellen Brill and Jon Hutman	Won	
St. Louis Film Critics Association	December 19, 2021	Best Actress	Nicole Kidman	Nominated	
St. Louis Film Critics Association	December 19, 2021	Best Original Screenplay	Aaron Sorkin	Nominated	
St. Louis Film Critics Association	December 19, 2021	Best Ensemble	Being the Ricardos	Nominated	
Washington D.C. Area Film Critics Association	December 6, 2021	Best Actress	Nicole Kidman	Nominated	
Writers Guild of America Awards	March 20, 2022	Best Original Screenplay	Aaron Sorkin	Nominated	
