= Charles Koerner =

American film producer (1896–1946)

Charles W. Koerner
- Born: September 10, 1896; New Orleans, Louisiana, US
- Died: February 2, 1946 (aged 49); Hollywood, California, US
- Occupation: Film executive

Charles W. Koerner (September 10, 1896 – February 2, 1946) was an American film executive, best known for being executive vice president of production at RKO Radio Pictures from 1942 until his death in 1946.

Koerner is best remembered for firing Orson Welles from RKO. However, he was a highly successful executive, helping RKO turn around its financial performance from the George J. Schaefer regime.

== Biography ==
Born to a Jewish family in New Orleans, he worked in theaters after school and went on to attend Shattuck Military Academy.

After the academy, he owned and managed a theater in Havre Montana but sold it when he enlisted for World War I.

After returning from the war, he managed several theater chains. He was manager for First National in Portland Oregon but left that organisation in 1926 to join George Mann, who owned picture houses in north California. He worked for a theatre that was sold to Hughes-Franklin in 1931 and Koerner became the personal representative of Harold B. Franklin. Franklin later became the president of RKO's theater division and put Koerner in charge of the theaters in the Southwestern United States.

In 1933 Koerner was in charge of RKO's theatres in New England. Variety' said "He gained a reputation for showmanly treatment of vaudeville."

In March 1936 he produced a French themed vaudeville show for RKO theatres. In 1939 he was appointed in charge of O houses in Los Angeles, Frisco, Denver and Salt Lake.

By 1941 he was head of RKO theatres. Variety reported "Koerner is known in the vaude trade as an astute Judge of stage talent and a showman in selling It to the best boxoffice advantage."

=== Head of RKO ===
Koerner was appointed vice president in charge of production in 1942. It was originally a temporary assignment during executive Joseph Breen's illness, but the job became permanent in May and Koerner was given a free hand over production.

Among Koerner's early actions was terminating the contract between RKO and Welles. (When told the news, Welles famously quipped "Don't worry, boys. We're just passing a bad Koerner.")

He also ended the contract between RKO and Pare Lorentz and wrote off more than $500,000 in story properties including Sister Carrie. According to one obituary, "If he was strong willed in economies, he was daring in constructive effort. His formula was horse sense and harmony. He brought in top-ranking directors. He got qualified stars and able producers. Yet since he'd come up from the ranks, he staged in the ranks."

Koerner declared "I believe that probably the greatest attribute we can bring to the Organisation is one of good common sense, and frankly that seems to be at something of a premium in Hollywood. It is going to take us a solid six to eight months to get rid of the choking commitments we have at this time... Our production forces will be levelling off at only one major target, the exhibitor, and through the exhibitor, the public."

Koerner's motto was "showmanship instead of genius" and among the other contracts he terminated were ones with OGabriel Pascal and Jed Harris.

By the end of 1942 RKO showed a profit for the first time in five years.

Among his most notable achievements were hiring Val Lewton. He had successes with films from director Edward Dmytryk such as Hitler's Children, Murder, My Sweet, and Back to Bataan. He also encouraged a steady supply of lower-budget "B" features, series, and westerns, arranging for the "B" product to support the major features, and thus guaranteeing that theaters would be presenting ready-made, all-RKO programming. Koerner made larger budgeted pictures such as The Spanish Main and more prestigious films like None but the Lonely Heart.

Koerner let Lucille Ball leave the studio. Ball later said "“Charlie Koerner wished me luck else¬ where, but I didn’t want to leave. They almost had to carry me out. They could have put me in D pictures and I wouldn’t have cared, so long as I kept on working." He signed Frank Sinatra to RKO and the singer made his first two films there. Koerner suggested Dick Powell for the lead in Murder My Sweet which revitalised Powell's career. He signed Harriet Parsons to a producing contract.

Koerner supported Thomas Dewey in the 1944 United States presidential election.

Koerner brought the story of It's a Wonderful Life for Frank Capra, who made it through Liberty Films. Among the projects Koerner initiated that were released after his death were Sister Kenny and I Remember Mama.

=== Illness and death ===
Koerner thought he was in good health until he felt a twinge in a foot. Then glands in his neck started to swell. His doctors did tests and discovered leukemia. His wife and doctors decided not to tell him. He died on February 2, 1946.

Koerner was temporarily replaced by Peter Rathvon before being permanently replaced by Dore Schary.

=== Tributes ===
Jean Renoir called him "an extraordinary man... I deeply regretted his unfortunate death. Had he not died, I believe I should have made twenty films for RKO. I would have worked all my life at RKO. He was a man who knew the business and the exploitation of the cinema, but at the same time conceded that one must experiment."

Edward Dmytryk called him "the best executive I have ever known. He made decisions quickly and firmly, he could be convinced, and he had the one truly great executive talent — once he delegated authority, he never interfered. Also, like all truly competent executives I have known, he always seemed to have plenty of time. Whenever I called his secretary with a request to see Koerner, the answer was either 'Come right up' or 'He’s got someone with him — can you come up in fifteen minutes?' How rare that is."

== Personal life ==
In December 1926 his wife Dorothy died. His widow, Vivian C. Koerner, married Rodney Pantages in 1953.

== Notable films under Koerner's regime ==
- Cat People (1942)
- I Walked with a Zombie (1943)
- Murder, My Sweet (1944)
- Bells of St. Mary's (1945)
- The Enchanted Cottage (1945)
