= Javier Bardem =

Spanish actor (born 1969)

- Bardem in 2026
- Born: Javier Ángel Encinas Bardem; 1 March 1969 (age 57); Las Palmas, Spain
- Occupation: Actor
- Years active: 1990–present
- Works: Filmography
- Spouse: Penélope Cruz (m. 2010)
- Children: 2
- Mother: Pilar Bardem
- Relatives: Carlos Bardem (brother); Mónica Bardem (sister); Juan Antonio Bardem (uncle); Rafael Bardem (grandfather); Matilde Muñoz Sampedro (grandmother); Miguel Bardem (cousin)
- Awards: Full list

Javier Ángel Encinas Bardem (born 1 March 1969) is a Spanish actor. In a career spanning over three decades, he has received various accolades, including an Academy Award, a BAFTA Award, a Golden Globe Award, a Critics' Choice Movie Award, two Actor Awards, and seven Goya Awards, in addition to a Cannes Film Festival Award and two Volpi Cups.

Bardem is the son of actress Pilar Bardem. He first became known for such Spanish films as Jamón jamón (1992), Running Out of Time (1994), Boca a boca (1995), Live Flesh (1997), Mondays in the Sun (2002), and The Sea Inside (2004). He won the Academy Award for Best Supporting Actor for his portrayal of Anton Chigurh in the Coen brothers' crime film No Country for Old Men (2007). He was Oscar-nominated for playing Reinaldo Arenas in Before Night Falls (2000), a criminal with cancer in Biutiful (2010), and Desi Arnaz in Being the Ricardos (2021).

Bardem has also starred in auteur driven films such as Woody Allen's romantic drama Vicky Cristina Barcelona (2008), Terrence Malick's drama To the Wonder (2013), Darren Aronofsky's horror film Mother! (2017), Asghar Farhadi's mystery drama Everybody Knows (2018), Fernando León de Aranoa's The Good Boss (2021), and Rodrigo Sorogoyen's The Beloved (2026). He also acted in blockbuster films such as Eat Pray Love (2010), the James Bond film Skyfall (2012), the swashbuckler film Pirates of the Caribbean: Dead Men Tell No Tales (2017), the science fiction epic films Dune (2021) and Dune: Part Two (2024), Disney's live-action remake The Little Mermaid (2023), and the sports action film F1 (2025).

On television, he portrayed José Menendez in the crime anthology series Monsters: The Lyle and Erik Menendez Story (2024), for which he earned two Primetime Emmy Awards nominations for Outstanding Supporting Actor in a Limited or Anthology Series or Movie and Outstanding Limited or Anthology Series (as an executive producer) and Max Cady in the Apple TV thriller Cape Fear.

Bardem married actress Penélope Cruz in 2010 and together they have two children. In January 2018, Bardem became the ambassador of Greenpeace for the protection of Antarctica.

== Early life ==
Javier Ángel Encinas Bardem was born on 1 March 1969 in Las Palmas, in the Canary Islands. His mother, Pilar Bardem (1939–2021), was an actress, and his father, José Carlos Encinas Doussinague (1931–1995), was the son of a cattle rancher from the province of Salamanca. According to Pilar's memoirs, José had a "capricious and violent will," and shot up the front door. He changed jobs more than 10 times, leading to evictions and the children going hungry. The two separated shortly after Javier's birth. His mother raised him and his elder siblings, Carlos and Mónica, alone (another sibling died shortly after birth), both of whom have also pursued an acting career. His father died of leukemia in 1995.

On his mother’s side, Bardem comes from a long line of filmmakers and actors dating back to the earliest days of Spanish cinema. He is a grandson of actors Rafael Bardem and Matilde Muñoz Sampedro (sister of actresses Mercedes and Guadalupe), and a nephew of screenwriter and director Juan Antonio Bardem. On the latter's side, he is a cousin of filmmaker Miguel Bardem. His uncle Juan Antonio was imprisoned by the Franco regime for his anti-fascist films. Bardem was brought up in the Roman Catholic faith by his grandmother.

As a child, he spent time at theatres and on film sets. In 1974, he made his first television appearance, in Fernando Fernán Gómez's television series El pícaro (The Scoundrel).

He also played rugby throughout his youth. Initially starting as a flanker, he also played prop for the Spain under-16 and under-18 squads before briefly playing for the senior team.

Though he grew up in a family full of actors, Bardem did not see himself going into the family business, and painting was his preferred medium. He went on to study painting for four years at Madrid's Escuela de Artes y Oficios. In need of money, he took acting jobs to support his painting but felt he was a bad painter and eventually abandoned it as a career.

In 1989, for the Spanish comedy show El Día Por Delante (The Day Ahead), he had to wear a Superman costume for a comedic sketch, a job that made him question whether he wanted to be an actor at all. Bardem also worked as a stripper (for one day) during his struggling acting career.

== Career ==
=== 1990–1999: Early roles ===
Bardem came to notice in a small role in his first major motion picture, The Ages of Lulu, when he was 21, in which he appeared along with his mother, Pilar Bardem. He also appeared in minor roles in Amo tu cama rica and High Heels. Bigas Luna, the director of Lulu, was sufficiently impressed to give him the leading male role in his next film, Jamón jamón in 1992, in which Bardem played a would-be underwear model and bullfighter. The film, which also starred his eventual wife Penélope Cruz, was a major international success. Bardem featured in Sancho Gracia's Huidos, and starred in Luna's next film Golden Balls (1993).

Bardem's talent did not go unnoticed in the English-speaking world. In 1997, John Malkovich was the first to approach him, then a 27-year-old, for a role in English, but he turned down the offer because his English was still poor. His first English-speaking role came that same year with director Álex de la Iglesia's in Perdita Durango, playing a santería-practicing bank robber.

=== 2000–2011: Breakthrough and acclaim ===
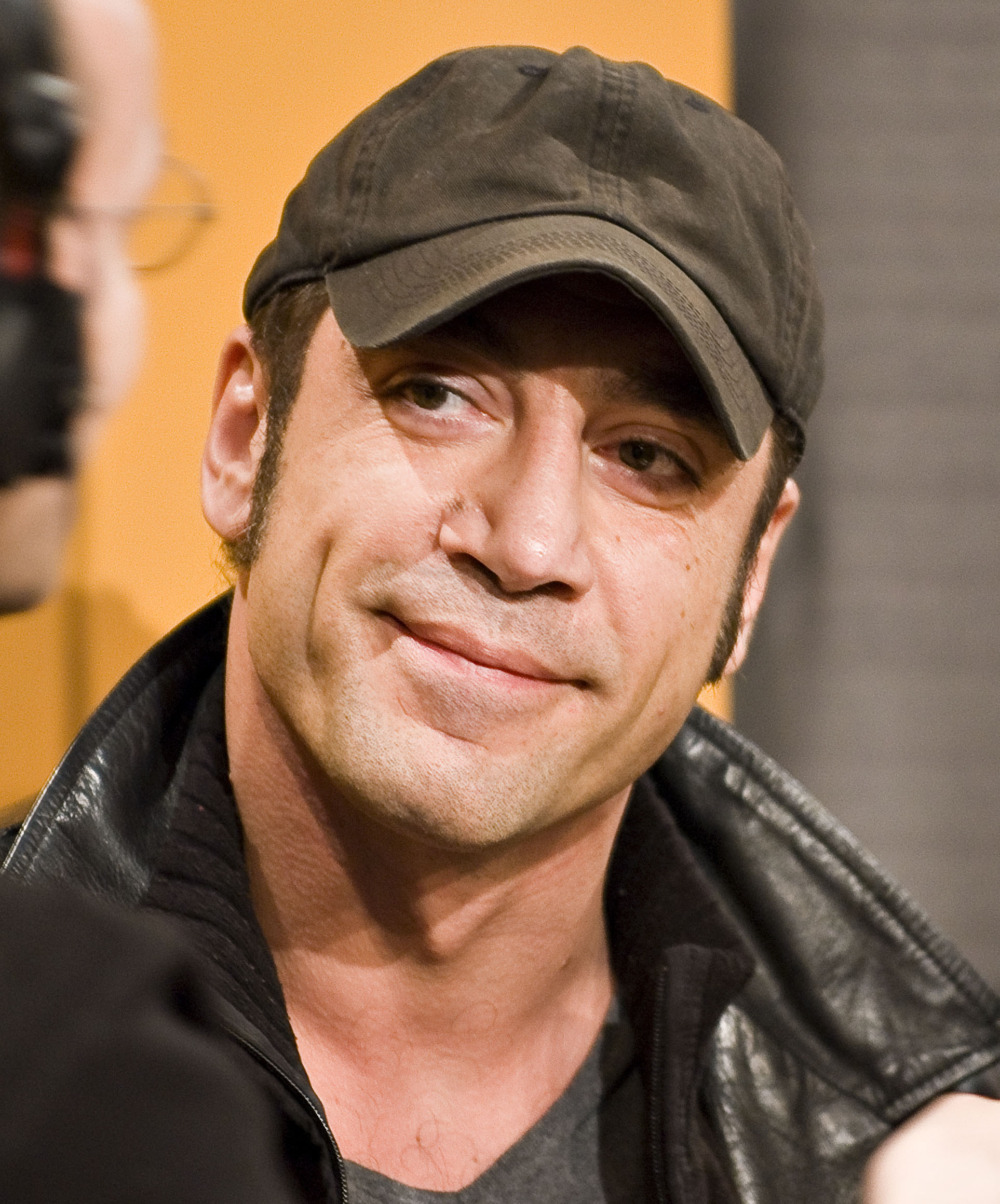
Bardem at the 57th Berlin International Film Festival

After starring in about two dozen films in his native country, he gained international recognition in Julian Schnabel's Before Night Falls in 2000, portraying Cuban poet Reinaldo Arenas. He received praise from his idol Al Pacino; the message Pacino left on Bardem's answering machine was something he considers one of the most beautiful gifts he has ever received. For that role, he received a nomination for the Academy Award for Best Actor, becoming the first Spaniard to do so. Immediately after, he turned down the role of Danny Witwer in Minority Report which eventually went to Colin Farrell. Instead, in 2002, Bardem starred in Malkovich's directorial debut, The Dancer Upstairs. Malkovich originally had Bardem in mind for the role of the detective's assistant, but the movie's time trying to find financing gave Bardem time to learn English and take on the lead role of the detective. "I will always be grateful to him because he really gave me my very first chance to work in English", Bardem has said of Malkovich.

Bardem won Best Actor at the Venice Film Festival for his role in Mar adentro, released in the United States as The Sea Inside (2004), in which he portrayed the quadriplegic turned assisted suicide activist Ramón Sampedro. He made his Hollywood major studio debut in the 2004 crime action film Collateral, with a scene as a crime lord who provides Tom Cruise's hitman with the list of remaining witnesses to be dispatched. He starred in Miloš Forman's 2006 film Goya's Ghosts opposite Natalie Portman and Stellan Skarsgard, as a monk during the Spanish Inquisition.

In 2007, Bardem acted in two film adaptations: the Coen brothers' No Country for Old Men with Tommy Lee Jones and Josh Brolin by Cormac McCarthy, and Mike Newell's Love in the Time of Cholera with Giovanna Mezzogiorno by Gabriel García Márquez. In No Country for Old Men, he played a psychopathic assassin, Anton Chigurh. For that role, he became the first Spaniard to win an Academy Award for Best Supporting Actor. For that role, he also won Golden Globe Award, Screen Actors Guild Award, Critics' Choice Award, and BAFTA Award in the same category.

Bardem's rendition of Chigurh's trademark quote, "What business is it of yours where I'm from, friendo?" (in response to the convenience store owner's query, "Y'all gettin' any rain up your way?"), was named Top HollyWORDIE of 2007 in the annual survey by the Global Language Monitor. Chigurh was named No. 26 in Entertainment Weekly magazine's 2008 "50 Most Vile Villains in Movie History" list.

Bardem's life's work was honored at the 2007 Gotham Awards, produced by The Gotham Film & Media Institute. In 2014, Belgian psychiatry professor Samuel Leistedt and 10 associates watched 400 movies over the course of three years and identified 126 psychopathic characters: Bardem's rendition of Chigurh was voted the most realistic psychopath.

Francis Ford Coppola singled out Bardem as an heir to, and even improvement on, Pacino, Jack Nicholson and Robert De Niro, referring to Bardem as ambitious, hungry, unwilling to rest on his laurels and always "excited to do something good." Bardem was attached to play the role of Tetro's mentor in Coppola's film Tetro, but the director felt the character should be female, so he was replaced by fellow Spaniard Carmen Maura. Bardem was originally cast to play fictional filmmaker Guido Contini in the film adaptation of the Broadway musical Nine but dropped out due to exhaustion. The part eventually went to Daniel Day-Lewis. He went on to star alongside Cruz and Scarlett Johansson in Woody Allen's Vicky Cristina Barcelona (2008), where he earned his fourth Golden Globe nomination.

=== 2012–present: Established career ===
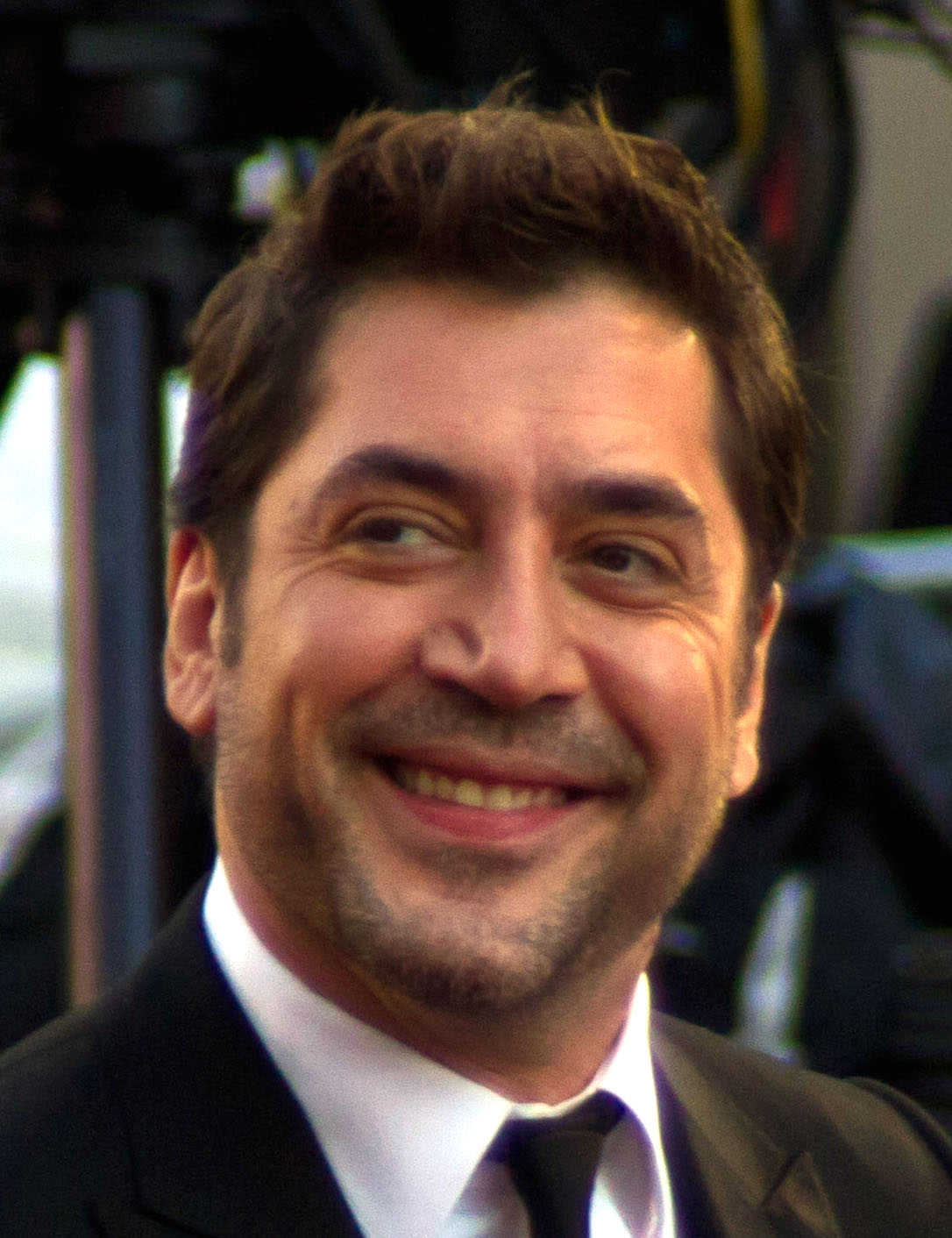
Bardem at the 83rd Academy Awards in 2011

In 2010, Bardem was awarded Best Actor at the Cannes Film Festival for his performance in Biutiful directed by Alejandro González Iñárritu, who specifically wrote the film with Bardem in mind. After being overlooked by the Globes and SAG, Bardem was the unexpected Oscar nominee on 25 January 2011, becoming the first all Spanish-language Best Actor nominee ever. He won his fifth Goya Award, this time for Best Actor in Biutiful, dedicating the win to his wife, Cruz, and their newborn son. Around this same time, he was offered the lead role of "Gunslinger" Roland Deschain in Ron Howard's film adaptation of Stephen King's Dark Tower novels. If he had signed on, he would have starred in the TV series as well. Then Eon Productions offered him a role as villain Raoul Silva in the James Bond film Skyfall. With Universal Pictures deciding not to go forward with the ultra-ambitious adaptation of the eight-novel King series, and to end months of speculation, Bardem officially confirmed his role in Skyfall during an interview with Christiane Amanpour for ABC's Nightline.

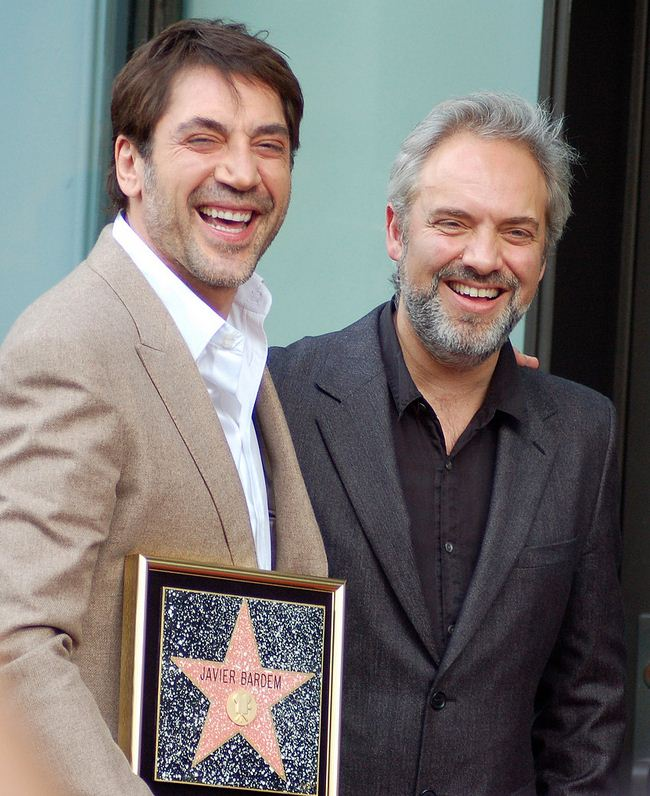
Bardem receiving his star on the Hollywood Walk of Fame alongside director Sam Mendes in 2012

Bardem received the 2,484th star of the Hollywood Walk of Fame on 8 November 2012. The star is located outside the El Capitan Theatre. With his movie Sons of the Clouds (2012), he demonstrated the suffering of the Sahrawi people in refugee camps. He publicly denounced the UN as unwilling to definitively resolve the human crisis there.

Bardem portrayed the main antagonist, Armando Salazar, in 2017's Pirates of the Caribbean: Dead Men Tell No Tales, the fifth film in the series. In the same year, he starred with Jennifer Lawrence, Michelle Pfeiffer, and Ed Harris in the horror film Mother! by director Darren Aronofsky, which focuses on a couple whose lives are disrupted by the arrival of unexpected guests. In 2018, Bardem once again appeared on screen alongside his spouse Cruz in Asghar Farhadi's feature film Everybody Knows.

In 2021, Bardem portrayed Stilgar in Denis Villeneuve's science fiction film Dune. That same year, he starred as Julio Blanco in Fernando León de Aranoa's workplace satire The Good Boss. His leading performance portraying a manipulative factory boss was considered among the finest of his career by critics, and clinched him another Goya Award. Also in 2021, he starred as Desi Arnaz, alongside Nicole Kidman as his on-screen wife Lucille Ball, in Amazon MGM Studios' and Aaron Sorkin's Being the Ricardos. Despite unfavorable reactions in response to his casting as Arnaz, Bardem's portrayal received praise. For his performance, he received nominations for the Golden Globe Award for Best Actor in a Motion Picture – Drama and the Actor Award for Outstanding Performance by a Male Actor in a Leading Role, as well as his third Academy Award nomination for Best Actor, his fourth nomination overall.

Bardem was initially set to play Frankenstein's monster in the upcoming remake of the Bride of Frankenstein directed by Bill Condon, but the project was eventually cancelled. He appeared in the 2022 film Lyle, Lyle, Crocodile and played King Triton in Disney's 2023 live-action/CGI movie, The Little Mermaid, directed by Rob Marshall. In 2024, Bardem reprised the role of Stilgar in Dune: Part Two and worked once again with Kidman in the animated film, Spellbound. On 10 July 2023, Deadline announced that Bardem would star with Brad Pitt in F1 for Apple TV, with Warner Bros. Pictures handling theatrical distribution. The film was released in 2025.

Bardem attending the 83rd Venice International Film Festival in 2026

In September 2024, during the reception of his 2023 Donostia Award for career achievement at the 72nd San Sebastián International Film Festival, answering a question about his availability to Spanish filmmakers other than his friend de Aranoa, Bardem announced that he had been cast to star alongside Victoria Luengo in Rodrigo Sorogoyen's The Beloved, due to begin filming in January 2025 in Fuerteventura. The film premiered at the 2026 Cannes Film Festival. Peter Bradshaw from The Guardian assessed that, in The Beloved, Bardem gives "his scariest performance since No Country for Old Men", as a "coercive and controlling" movie director. In 2024, he starred as José Menendez, the father of Lyle and Erik Menendez, in Monsters: The Lyle and Erik Menendez Story, which earned him nominations for Primetime Emmy Award, Golden Globe Award, and Screen Actors Guild Award in the Best Supporting Actor category. In advance of the 2025 Cannes Film Market, Bardem was reported to have been cast in Florian Zeller's psychological thriller Bunker alongside his wife Cruz. Bardem portrayed Max Cady in the Apple TV series Cape Fear, opposite Amy Adams and Patrick Wilson.

Bardem will make his stage debut on 5 November 2026 at Espacio Zafra Teatro in Madrid in the play Chéjov, Chéjov, directed and adapted by Bardem's acting coach Juan Carlos Corazza from short stories by Anton Chekhov.

In 2026, Bardem joined the voice cast of the upcoming animated film The Turning Door.

== Activism and political stances ==
Bardem has outspokenly defended the convenience for taking positions in the public sphere, stating that "neutrality is all very well for Switzerland", "but [for] life [it] is something else entirely", upholding "that your values should not harm you or hurt others, but rather bring people together, build bridges and help to speak out against what you consider to be unfair".

=== Western Sahara ===
Long committed to the plight of the Sahrawi people, Bardem served as spokesperson of the platform 'All with the Sahara', that collected signatures to ask the Spanish government to "lead the search for a peaceful and just solution to a conflict that affects us directly". Bardem produced and narrated the documentary film Sons of the Clouds about life in the Sahrawi refugee camps. In July 2025, Bardem voiced concern about the shooting of The Odyssey in Dakhla, Western Sahara, denouncing that "for 50 years, Morocco has occupied Western Sahara, expelling the Sahrawi people from their cities. Dakhla is one of them, converted by the Moroccan occupiers into a tourist destination and now a film set, always with the aim of erasing the Sahrawi identity of the city". He likewise appeared as a signatory in a manifesto promoted by FiSahara against the shooting of the film in Moroccan-occupied Western Sahara.

=== Palestine ===
Bardem has been a longtime advocate for Palestinian rights. During the 2014 Gaza War, Bardem and Cruz signed an open letter denouncing Israel's actions during the conflict as genocide.

In September 2024, Bardem criticized Israel's military operations in the Gaza Strip and the "unconditional support" of Israel by the United States, the United Kingdom, and Germany, saying that "Israel's extreme right-wing nationalist government is not at all representative of the Jewish community or Israeli society." In May 2025, Bardem signed a letter criticizing the film industry's "passivity" during the ongoing Gaza genocide. In June 2025, Bardem told The View that Israel was committing genocide in Gaza with the "back-up of the United States" and the "silence of Europe". During the 77th Primetime Creative Arts Emmy Awards, he briefly stated to E! that he denounced the Gaza genocide while wearing a Palestinian keffiyeh, before concluding the interview with a "Free Palestine" chant. He is a signatory of the Film Workers for Palestine boycott pledge that was published in September 2025.

In 2026, he co-signed alongside other Spanish artists a text urging the United Nations and the governments of the world to actively work towards the release of Palestinian leader Marwan Barghouti from prison.

At the 98th Academy Awards, while presenting the award for Best International Feature Film alongside Priyanka Chopra, Bardem said "No to war, and Free Palestine", earning a huge round of applause from the audience. He wore a badge reading "No a la guerra" (Spanish for "No to war"), a pin he revealed he had first worn 23 years earlier to protest the Iraq War. He also wore a pin of Handala, expressing solidarity with Palestine and calling it a "Palestine symbol of resistance."

In September 2026, he co-signed the manifesto "against the genocide in Palestine and in defense of freedom of expression" alongside other professionals in the Spanish film industry demanding "an immediate end to the genocide being perpetrated by the State of Israel in Gaza and compliance with UN resolutions calling for its withdrawal from the occupied territories" as well as denouncing "the censorship, persecution and threats" against NAZA directors Yuval Abraham and Rachel Szor.

In October 2026, Bardem shared multiple posts on Instagram encouraging his followers to sign a Change.org petition calling for Pink's dismissal as a UNICEF ambassador, after she received backlash for sharing a post from the pro-Israel group StopAntisemitism that criticised Macklemore for supporting Palestinians while touring with Ed Sheeran.

=== Iraq War ===
Bardem was an outspoken opponent of the Iraq War. In February 2003, he joined Pedro Almodóvar and other Spanish film industry figures in massive anti-war marches in Madrid, where millions protested their government's support for the U.S.-led invasion. At the 19th Goya Awards, Bardem won Best Actor and used his acceptance speech to urging the Spanish government to withdraw its troops.

=== Others ===
In May 2011 Bardem teamed up with the Enough Project's co-founder John Prendergast to raise awareness about conflict minerals in eastern Congo. In July 2019, Bardem signed a manifesto urging PSOE and Podemos parties to reach an agreement to form a ministry after the April 2019 elections in Spain.

When Russia invaded Ukraine on 24 February 2022, Bardem staged a protest at the Russian embassy in Madrid the same day. In an interview with Nancy Tartaglione of Deadline, Bardem condemned Russian president Vladimir Putin as an "imperialist", while also criticizing the enlargement of NATO. During the 37th Independent Spirit Awards, Bardem again expressed his support for Ukraine.

In November 2019, during the March for Climate in Madrid, Bardem gave a speech on stage where he called both the mayor of Madrid José Luis Martínez-Almeida and the US president Donald Trump "stupid". He later apologized, declaring that "the insult illegitimizes any speech and conversation."

In October 2026, he participated alongside other artists in a video performing the L gesture in support for Lula against Flávio Bolsonaro in the eve of the runoff of the Brazilian presidential election.

== Personal life ==
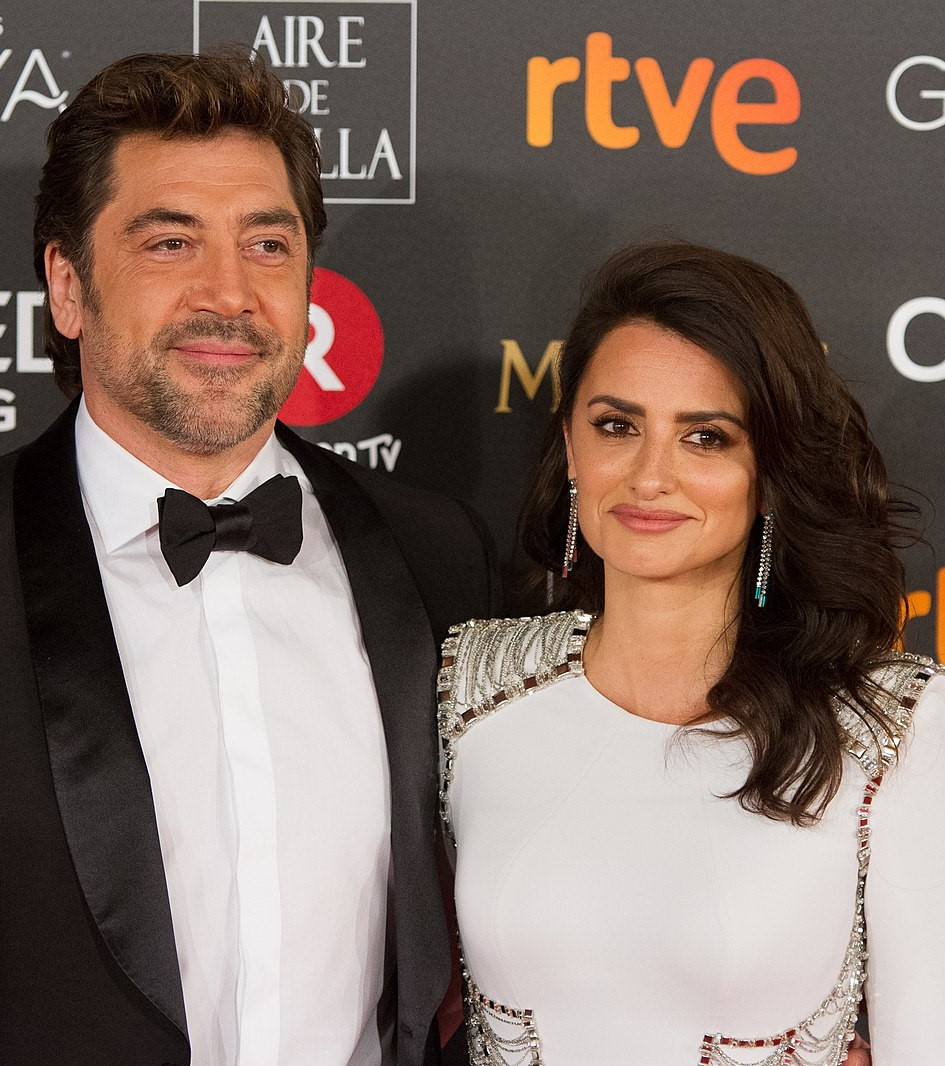
Bardem and his wife Penélope Cruz at the 32nd Goya Awards in 2018

=== Marriage and family ===
In 2007, Bardem began dating fellow Spanish actress Penélope Cruz; they had already known each other after appearing together in Jamón jamón. Bardem and Cruz have maintained a low public profile, refusing to discuss their personal lives. The couple married in July 2010 in the Bahamas. They have two children: a son born on 23 January 2011, in Los Angeles; and a daughter born on 22 July 2013, in Madrid.

In September 2018, at the Toronto Film Festival premiere of Everybody Knows, Bardem told Ikon London Magazine about acting together with his spouse: "I find it very easy. In a sense that we play what we are supposed to play and then we go back to our daily life which is way more interesting than any fiction. And it is real."

=== Interests ===
Bardem's native language is Spanish, and he is also fluent in English. He does not drive, only getting behind the wheel for film roles, and he refers to himself as a "worker" or "entertainer", not an actor. In 2024, he stated that he still saw himself as "the son of Pilar", adding that he did not want "to be anything else". Asked about his relation to U.S. culture in James Rhodes' radio show En clave, Bardem answered that, with all due respect, he does not belong to it, explaining that "here [in Spain] are my friends, here is my family, here are my roots, here is my language, here is my country. This is what I feel deep down. And what worries me is the politics of my country".

He is also a fan of rugby union, having played for the Spain national team in his youth and for the senior team. His love for the sport has continued throughout his life, even attending a semi-final of the 2023 Rugby World Cup between New Zealand and Argentina.

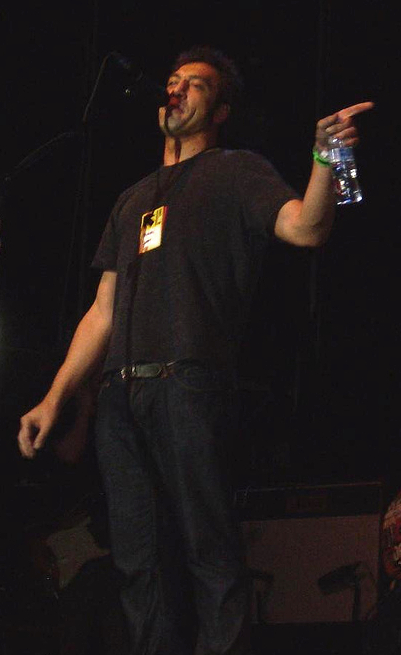
Bardem made an appearance on the stage of Festimad 2007 to introduce Pearl Jam's "Black".

He is a fan of heavy metal music, calling it "a way of living" and "the thing that makes my heart beat"; he credits the band AC/DC for helping him learn to speak English, in some respects. He is also a fan of Pearl Jam, and credited Linkin Park, Slipknot, Falling in Reverse and Bad Omens as inspiration for getting into his role in Cape Fear.

Although Bardem was raised as a Catholic, he is now an atheist. He expressed his support of gay marriage in Spain. Bardem emphasized that while ego drives acting, it should not interfere with filmmaking. He later said that although he does not believe strongly in the supernatural, he does not deny it. "We are just this little tiny spot in the whole universe, so of course there must be other things, other people, other creatures, other lives and other dimensions. Sure, I believe in it". In the same interview, Bardem stated that he thinks science and belief "should go together".

Despite having portrayed multiple villainous characters throughout his acting career, Bardem has a self-confessed "hatred" of violence that stems from a fight in a nightclub in his early 20s that left him with a broken nose.

In 2025, Bardem revealed that he is a fan of Spanish football club Atlético Madrid on the show Conan O'Brien Must Go.

== Filmography and accolades ==
Over his career, he has been recognized by the Academy of Motion Picture Arts and Sciences for the following performances:

- 73rd Academy Awards: Best Actor, nomination, for Before Night Falls (2000)
- 80th Academy Awards: Best Supporting Actor, win, No Country for Old Men (2008)
- 83rd Academy Awards: Best Actor, nomination, Biutiful (2010)
- 94th Academy Awards: Best Actor, nomination, Being the Ricardos (2021)

== See also ==
- List of Spanish Academy Award winners and nominees
- List of European Academy Award winners and nominees
- List of actors with Academy Award nominations
- List of actors with more than one Academy Award nomination in the acting categories
- List of actors nominated for Academy Awards for non-English performances
- List of Golden Globe winners
- List of actors with Hollywood Walk of Fame motion picture stars
- List of atheists in film, radio, television and theater
