= Ramón Sampedro =

Spanish seaman, writer, and euthanesia activist (1943 – 1998)

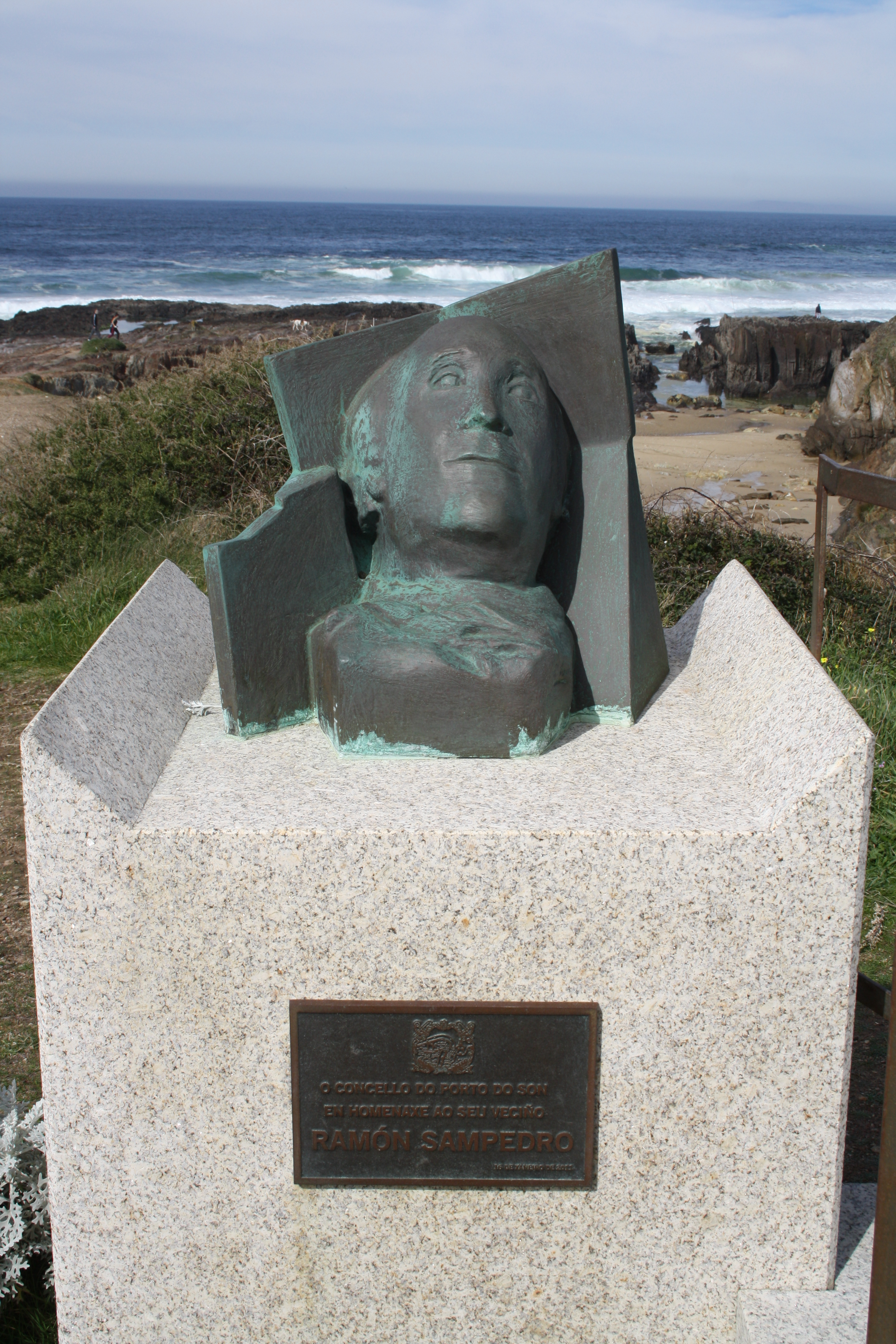
- A memorial to Sampedro in As Furnas
- Born: Ramón Sampedro Cameán; 5 January 1943; Porto do Son, Galicia, Spain
- Died: 12 January 1998 (aged 55); Boiro, Galicia, Spain
- Cause of death: Assisted suicide by ingesting potassium cyanide
- Occupation: Seaman
- Known for: Right-to-die case

Ramón Sampedro Cameán (5 January 1943 – 12 January 1998) was a Spanish seaman and writer. Sampedro became a quadriplegic at the age of 25 (on 23 August 1968), following a diving accident, and fought for his right to assisted dying for the following 29 years.

== Demand for suicide ==
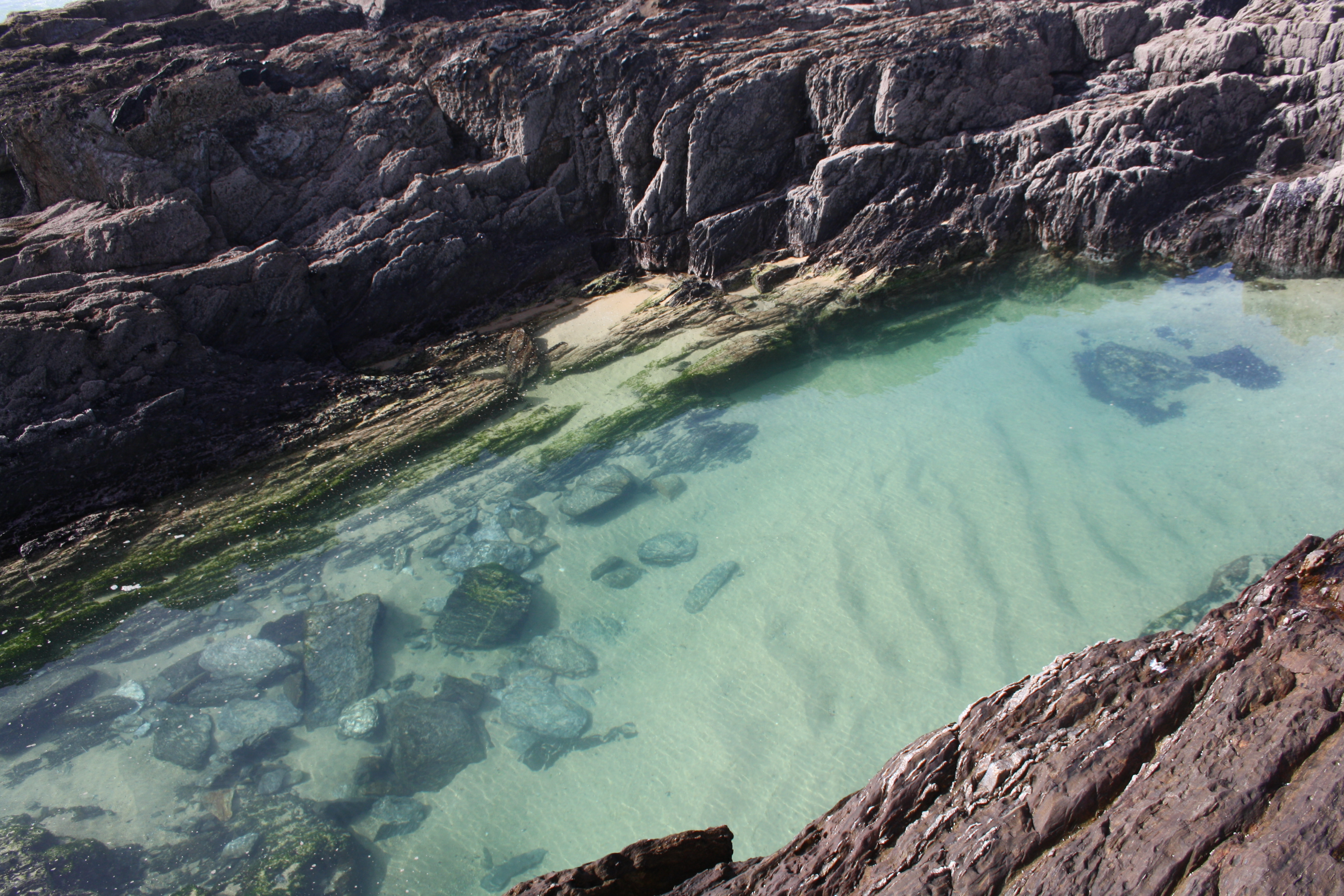
Place in As Furnas where Ramón Sampedro jumped into.

As a young man, Sampedro jumped into the sea from rocks near his home, a fishing village in the northern Spanish region of Galicia. Misjudging the water's depth, he struck his head on the seabed. He sustained a spinal cord injury, leaving him paralyzed from the neck down.

Sampedro applied to Spain's lower courts, its higher courts, and the European Commission on Human Rights in Strasbourg to legally end his life. His argument hinged on the fact that he was sure of his decision to die. However, owing to his paralysis, he was physically unable to die by suicide without help. He argued that suicide was a right that he was being denied, and he sought legal advice concerning his right to receive assistance to end his life, first in the courts of Spain, where his case attracted country-wide attention. Eventually, his fight became known worldwide.

== Death and aftermath ==
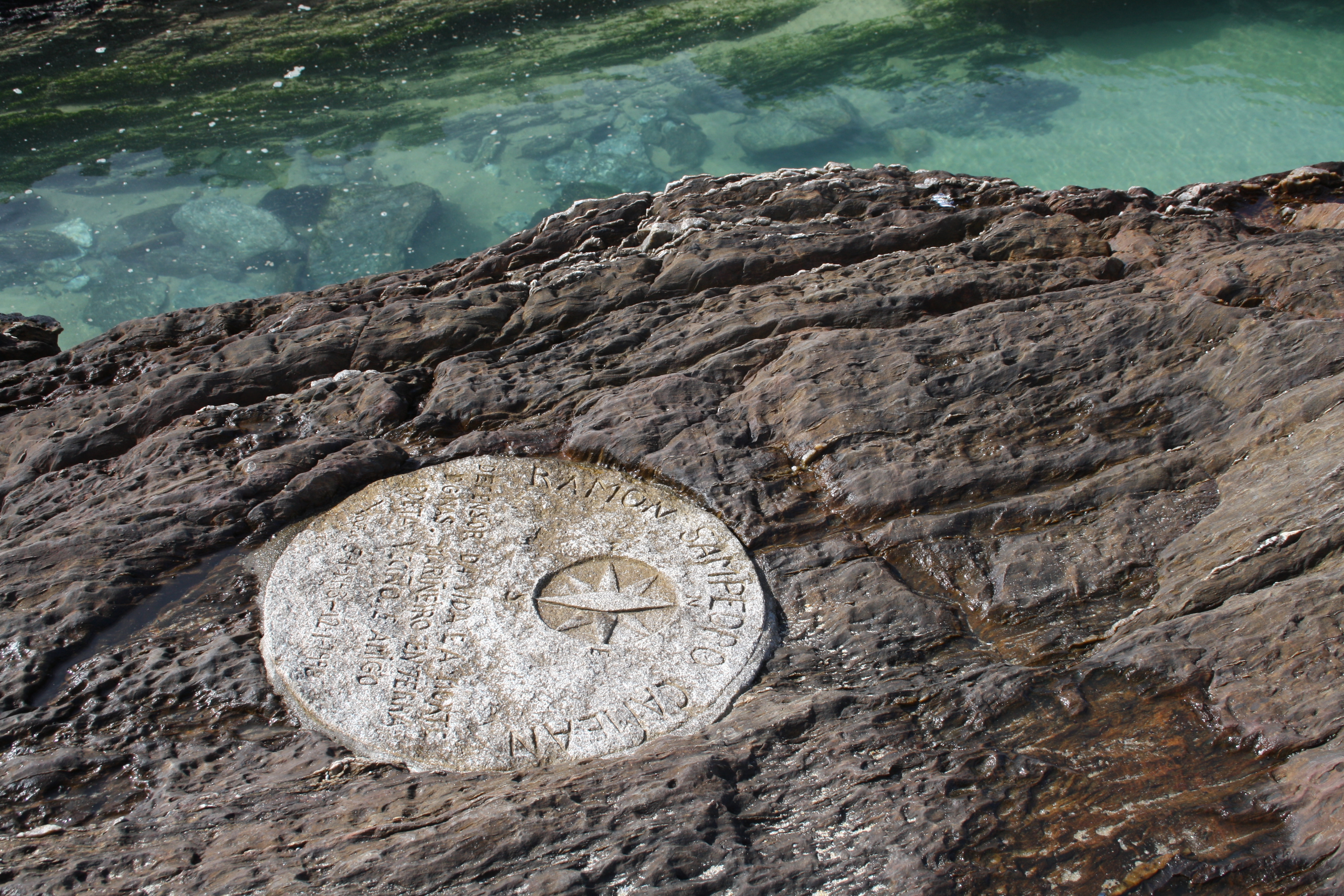
Commemorative plaque for Sampedro in As Furnas.

Sampedro died on Monday 12 January 1998 in Boiro, Spain, from potassium cyanide poisoning. Several days later, his close friend Ramona Maneiro was arrested and charged with assisting his suicide. Sampedro had divided the elements required to complete his suicide into individual tasks, each small enough that no single person could be convicted of assisting the suicide process entirely. Maneiro was released due to lack of evidence. No further charges were ever filed in connection with Sampedro's death.

Seven years later, after the statute of limitations had expired, Maneiro, speaking on a Spanish talk show, admitted to providing Sampedro with a cyanide-laced drink and a straw. She said "I did it for love." She also said she had turned on the video camera that recorded Sampedro's last words before he drank the poison and that she was in the room, behind the camera.

He left an open letter to the judges and society and caused an ethical turmoil in Spanish society which led to a Senatorial Committee on Euthanasia in 1999.

== In popular culture ==
The story of Sampedro's life and death has been made into two Spanish films:

Condenado a vivir (English: Condemned to Live) (2001) is a TV-movie jointly produced by FORTA, the association of the public broadcasting regional networks of Spain, directed by Roberto Bodegas, where Sampedro was played by Galician actor Ernesto Chao.

The Sea Inside (2004), directed by Alejandro Amenábar, in which he was portrayed by Javier Bardem. The movie drew international attention and won the Best Foreign Language Film award at the 77th Academy Awards.

Sampedro wrote a book before he died, titled Cartas desde el infierno. It includes a collection of poems, short essays, and reflections on life from Sampedro's point of view. After the release of Mar adentro, it was edited again. As of 2005, 100,000 copies of the book have been sold.

Spanish singer-songwriter Andrés Suárez wrote a song inspired by Sampedro's life, titled "Marinero," which was included on his 2007 album Maneras de romper una ola.

Sampedro was parodied by Carlos Areces in Spanish Movie (2009).

The storyline of the 2010 Bollywood film Guzaarish is similar to that of Mar adentro.
