= Sons of the Clouds =

2012 film

Sons of the Clouds: The Last Colony
- Film poster
- Directed by: Álvaro Longoria
- Written by: Álvaro Longoria
- Produced by: Javier Bardem; Álvaro Longoria; Lilly Hartley
- Starring: Javier Bardem; Álvaro Longoria; Carlos Bardem
- Narrated by: Elena Anaya; Javier Bardem
- Cinematography: Josu Inchaustegui
- Edited by: Yago Muñiz
- Music by: Fernando Velázquez
- Release date: 16 February 2012 (BIFF)
- Running time: 81 minutes
- Country: Spain
- Languages: Spanish; English Arabic ( Hassania the sahraui people language)

Sons of the Clouds: The Last Colony (Spanish: Hijos de las nubes, la última colonia) is a 2012 Spanish documentary film about people living in refugee camps in the Western Sahara. It is directed by Francisco Álvaro Longoria. It received the Goya Award for Best Documentary at the 27th Goya Awards.

== Cast ==
- Javier Bardem - Narrator
- Elena Anaya - Self (voice)
- Carlos Bardem - Self
- Lilly Hartley - Self
