= Anton Chigurh =

Character from No Country for Old Men

- Javier Bardem as Anton Chigurh in the Coen brothers' No Country for Old Men (2007)
- Created by: Cormac McCarthy
- Adapted by: Joel and Ethan Coen
- Portrayed by: Javier Bardem

In-universe information
- Gender: Male
- Occupation: Professional hitman
- Weapon: Captive bolt pistol Remington Model 11-87; Intratec TEC-9

Anton Chigurh (/ʃɪˈɡɜːr/ shih-GUR) is a fictional character and the main antagonist of Cormac McCarthy's 2005 novel No Country for Old Men, and its 2007 film adaptation of the same name by the Coen brothers, in which he is portrayed by Javier Bardem.

Bardem's performance as Chigurh was widely lauded by film critics—he won an Academy Award, a BAFTA Award, a Screen Actors Guild Award, a Golden Globe, and a Critics' Choice for Best Supporting Actor. Other accolades include Chigurh's presence on numerous Greatest Villain lists, most notably in Empire's list of The 100 Greatest Movie Characters of All Time, in which he was ranked #44, as well as being named the most realistic film depiction of a psychopath by an independent group of psychologists in the Journal of Forensic Sciences.

== Character overview ==
Chigurh is a man in around his 30s; a hitman devoid of conscience, remorse, and compassion. Whenever he is given a task, he will stop at no length to complete it, going as far as to murder anyone who gets in his way. Chigurh was described by cinema critics as a psychopath; researchers said that he lacks empathy, cannot feel love, feels no shame or remorse, and is a ruthless and determined killer. Psychiatrist Samuel Leistedt said that Bardem's performance was one of the most realistic depictions of a psychopath on film. Sometimes, Chigurh gives his victims an option to play heads or tails with him: if they lose, he will kill them and if they win, he lets them go. Chigurh uses a captive bolt pistol, a device used to stun or kill livestock, on a random motorist's forehead. His primary weapons are a silenced pistol and a silenced Remington shotgun; the captive bolt device is otherwise used to drive the cylinders out of door locks.

In the original novel, Anton Chigurh's origins are completely unexplained. During the creation of the movie, the Coen Brothers struggled with his adaptation due to lack of information. The novel kept the descriptions of Chigurh intentionally vague; one of the few descriptions in the story said: "He was medium height. Medium build. Looked like he was in shape. In his mid-thirties, maybe. Dark hair. Dark brown, I think. I don't know". Other mentions say that he has the smell of "foreign cologne" with "a medicinal edge to it". The movie showed Chigurh having black eyes and bowl-cut haircut; he is seen as a physical manifestation of evil akin to Michael Myers. Javier Bardem, in an interview with NPR, described Chigurh as a "character that comes out of nowhere, goes back to nowhere" that acts like he is a "force of the nature". He said that he is a philosophical killer who thinks that every murder he commits is an inevitable fate.

== Creation ==
Reportedly, McCarthy chose the name "Anton Chigurh" because it "sounded cool". Chigurh is a recurrence of the "Unstoppable Evil" archetype frequently found in McCarthy's work. However, the Coen brothers wanted to avoid one-dimensionality, particularly as with a comparison to The Terminator. To avoid a sense of identification, the Coens sought to cast someone "who could have come from Mars". The brothers introduced the character at the beginning of the film in a manner similar to the opening of the 1976 film The Man Who Fell to Earth. Film critic David DuBos described Chigurh as a "modern equivalent of Death from Ingmar Bergman's 1957 film The Seventh Seal".

The Coen brothers got the idea for Chigurh's hairstyle from a book of photography recommended by Tommy Lee Jones, Boystown: La Zona de Tolerancia, compiled by screenwriter and photographer Bill Wittliff. It featured a 1979 photo of a man sitting in the bar of a brothel, who had a style of hair and clothing similar to those worn by Chigurh in the film. Oscar-winning hairstylist Paul LeBlanc designed the hairdo. The Coens instructed LeBlanc to create a "strange and unsettling" hairstyle. LeBlanc based the style on the mop tops of the English warriors in the Crusades as well as the Mod haircuts of the 1960s. Bardem told LeBlanc each morning when he finished that the style helped him to get into character. Bardem joked that he was "not going to get laid for three months" because of his haircut. Bardem felt very upset by the haircut, and even fell into a depression. Fellow actors said that Bardem felt so ashamed of it that it was hard for him to leave his house.

During the creation of the movie, Bardem was not pleased with his role due to the violence his character committed; reportedly, he was not sure of why Coen brothers picked him for the role. In an interview with Entertainment Weekly, he said that he dislikes violence even in movies, adding that when the Coens called him and asked him to take part in the movie, he tried to decline their offer by saying: "Listen, I'm the wrong actor. I don't drive, I speak bad English, and I hate violence". They responded by saying: "Maybe that's why we called you". Despite the Coen brothers picking Bardem, they were concerned that his schedule would make it difficult for him to play the role, so they phoned Mark Strong, a British actor, and asked him if he was available to be a replacement for the role. Strong accepted the offer, but Bardem managed to clear his schedule a few days later. The events caused a slight confusion in the coverage of the movie, with some news outlets mistakenly reporting that Strong would play Chigurh.

== Role in the plot ==
In 1980, Chigurh is hired to retrieve a satchel holding $2.4 million. After killing those who hired him, he discovers a local welder, Llewelyn Moss, had taken the satchel after chancing upon it while hunting.

Chigurh tracks Moss down to a motel using a receiver that connects to a transponder hidden in the satchel. Moss has hidden the money in a ventilation duct. In both the film and the novel, Chigurh steals a key from the presumably murdered hotel clerk (this murder is not made explicit either in the film or the novel). He then seeks Moss, listening at various doors before punching the lock out of one of Moss' rooms. Rather than finding Moss, he encounters and kills three heavily armed Mexicans.

Chigurh discovers that another bounty hunter, former colleague Carson Wells, has been hired to retrieve the money and eliminate him. Chigurh kills Wells, who tried to broker a deal with Moss to protect him in exchange for the money. Chigurh intercepts a phone call from Moss in Wells' hotel room and offers to spare Moss' wife, Carla Jean, if Moss agrees to give up the money. Moss refuses and vows to track down and kill Chigurh. Mexican hitmen later kill Moss at a motel in El Paso. Unknown to the Mexicans, Moss had hidden the money in the vents again, which Chigurh retrieves.

Carla Jean finds Chigurh waiting for her after her mother's funeral. He listens to her pleas for mercy before asking her to bet her life on a coin toss. In the book, she calls heads; it comes up tails. In the film adaptation, she refuses to call the toss, saying the same words she says in the novel after losing the coin toss: "The coin didn't have no say. It was just you." The movie then cuts to a shot of Chigurh leaving the house and checking the soles of his boots for blood, implying that he has killed her; in the novel, McCarthy writes, "Then he shot her." While driving away from her house, Chigurh is badly injured in a car accident, sustaining an open fracture of his left ulna and walking away with a limp. At the scene of the accident, a teenager on a bicycle arrives and sees a wounded Chigurh, who requests the boy's shirt and uses it as a sling for his broken arm. Chigurh gives the teen a blood-soaked $100 bill as a bribe not to tell anyone he was there, then flees the scene before the ambulance arrives.

== Reception and legacy ==
=== Critical response ===
Critics of the movie compared Anton Chigurh to various characters, like the Terminator or the shark from Jaws. In 2007, Javier Bardem, who played Chigurh in the film, won an Academy Award for his performance. In 2012, UGO Networks ranked Chigurh in its list of top 11 "silver screen psychos", it said that he is "an assassin of little words" and a "man without a sense of humor". It described him as a ruthless killer whose victims only have a chance to survive if they win a coin toss. Empire magazine also ranked Chigurh #46 in their list of the 100 Greatest Movie Characters of All Time, praising the look on his face when he strangles a cop with his own handcuffs, it said that the way he kills his victims is "supernatural" and that his bowl cut is "utterly terrifying". The Artifice compared Chigurh to Jesus Christ in 2014, saying that the two characters are incompatible but his actions in the movie have some similarities to Jesus's acts in the bible. In a 2015 interview with Zahn McClarnon, The New York Times compared Chigurh to Hanzee Dent, a character in the Fargo TV series, played by McClarnon.

In 2017, Special Broadcasting Service described the performance of Chigurh as "chilling" and explained his personality in detail. In 2018, Business Insider ranked Chigurh in its top 10 list of "most terrifying fictional serial killers in TV and movies" and paraphased a study that said that he is the most realistic psychopath. In 2019, Backstage Magazine described Chigurh as "unstoppable and unapologetic killer" and detailed his creation, specifically his clothing, haircut and accent. In 2023, Law & Liberty said that the audience sees Chigurh as the embodiment of evil and that there is a chance he could become an internet meme due to their interest in evil movie characters, like Freddy Kruger. In the same year, The Criterion Collection analysed Chigurh and said that he is one of the "all-time-great movie villains" who was "brilliantly" played. In 2025, Screen Rant placed Chigurh in its top 10 list of movies where "the villain wins in the end", describing how he was able to successfully kill his targets and retrieve the money, getting away with his crimes.

=== In popular culture ===
In a February 2008 episode of Saturday Night Live, Fred Armisen played Chigurh in a sketch parodying the film There Will Be Blood. In May 2009, a Chigurh-inspired character appeared in "Waverly Hills, 9-0-2-1-D'oh", an episode of The Simpsons. He was named "inspector" and was seen flipping coins in the episode, he also used an air gun to clean Homer Simpson's parking space. In 2010, Chris Jericho, Canadian professional wrestler, said that he ended his 2-year hiatus from wrestling after watching the movie and being "inspired" by Chigurh. In the South Park episode "Band in China", Winnie the Pooh is killed by Randy Marsh; the killing was identical to the scene of Chigurh strangling a police officer in the movie.

In 2019, Hong Kong-based artist Stephen Case drew caricature paintings from every movie made by Coen brothers. The paintings included Chigurh. A deepfake video of Chigurh was uploaded on YouTube in the same year. It altered his face to look like Arnold Schwarzenegger and also changed his accent. In 2020, comedian Kevin James made a parody video of the movie, where he pretended to talk with Chigurh during the coin toss scene. In 2024, JD Vance, then vice president-elect of the US, quoted one of Chigurh's lines - "If the rule you followed brought you to this, of what use was the rule?" - in a post on X.
