= Yo-Yo Ma discography =

Discography for the cellist Yo-Yo Ma.

== Discography ==
1978:

- Finzi: Concerto for Cello and Orchestra Op. 40 (reissued 2007)

1979:

- Robert White Sings Beethoven

1980:

- Saint-Saëns: Carnival of the Animals | Variations on a Theme of Beethoven, OP. 35 | Polonaise, OP. 77
- Saint-Saëns and Lalo: Cello Concertos
- Beethoven: Triple Concerto in C Major, Op.56

1981:

- Haydn: Cello Concertos
- Beethoven: Complete Sonatas for Cello and Piano, Vol. 1 (with Emanuel Ax)

1982:

- Kreisler, Paganini

1983:

- Bach: Sonatas for Viola da Gamba and Harpsichord
- Bach: The Six Unaccompanied Cello Suites
- Shostakovich and Kabalevsky: Cello Concertos
- Beethoven: Cello Sonatas, Op.5, Nos.1 & 2
- Kreisler, Paganini: Works

1984:

- Bolling: Suite for Cello and Jazz Piano Trio
- Beethoven: Complete Sonatas for Cello and Piano, Vol. 2 (with Emanuel Ax)
- Schubert: String Quintet
- Haydn: Three Favorite Concertos -- Cello, Violin and Trumpet Concertos
- Beethoven Sonatas, Volume 2, No. 3, Op. 69; No. 5 Op. 102, No. 2

1985:

- Japanese Melodies
- Elgar, Walton: Cello Concertos
- Mozart: Divertimento, K.563
- Brahms: Sonatas for Cello and Piano (with Emanuel Ax)
- Schubert: Quintet in C Major

1986:

- Strauss: Don Quixote; Schoenberg: Concerto
- Beethoven: Complete Sonatas for Cello and Piano, Vol. 3 (with Emanuel Ax)
- Dvořák: Cello Concerto
- Beethoven: Cello Sonata No.4; Variations

1987:

- Boccherini: Concerto | J.C. Bach: Sinfonia Concertante and Grand Overture
- Mozart: Adagio and Fugue in C Minor | Schubert: String Quartet No.15
- Beethoven: Complete Cello Sonatas

1988:

- Schumann: Cello Concerto | Fantasiestucke, Op. 73 | Adagio and Allegro, Op. 70 | Funf Stucke im Volkston, Op. 102 (with Emanuel Ax)
- Dvořák: Piano Trios (with Emanuel Ax and Young Uck Kim)
- Brahms: Double Concerto; Piano Quartet (tracks 1–3, with the Chicago Symphony Orchestra with Claudio Abbado, conductor; tracks 4–7, with Emanuel Ax, Isaac Stern, and Jaime Laredo)
- Shostakovich: Piano Trio | Cello Sonata (with Emanuel Ax)

1989:

- Barber: Cello Concerto | Britten: Symphony for Cello & Orchestra
- Strauss and Britten: Cello Sonatas (with Emanuel Ax)
- Shostakovich: Quartet No.15 | Gubaidulina: Rejoice!
- Anything Goes: Stephane Grappelli & Yo-Yo Ma Play (Mostly) Cole Porter
- Great Cello Concertos: Dvořák, Elgar, Haydn, Saint-Saëns, Schumann
- The Japanese Album
- Portrait of Yo-Yo Ma
- Shostakovich: Symphony No.5; Cello Concerto

1990:

- Mozart: Serenade No. 10 | Sonata for Bassoon and Cello
- Brahms: The Piano Quartets (with Emanuel Ax, Isaac Stern, and Jaime Laredo)
  - 2 CDs: Piano Quartet No.1, op. 25 and No. 3, op. 60; Piano Quartet No. 2, op. 26
- A Cocktail Party
- Strauss: Don Quixote; Die Liebe der Danae

1991:

- Prokofiev and Rachmaninoff: Cello Sonatas (with Emanuel Ax)
- Tchaikovsky Gala in Leningrad
- Brahms: Double Concerto; Berg: Chamber Concerto
- Saint-Saëns: Cello Concerto No.1; Piano Concerto No.2; Violin Concerto No.3

1992:

- Hush (with Bobby McFerrin)
- Prokofiev: Sinfonia Concertante | Tchaikovsky: Variations
- Brahms: String Sextets | Theme and Variations for Piano
- Brahms: Sonatas for Cello and Piano (with Emanuel Ax)
- Saint-Saëns: Organ Symphony; Bacchanale; Marche militaire; Carnaval des animaux; Danse macabre

1993:

- Schoenberg: Verklarte Nacht | String Trio
- Made in America
- Yo-Yo Ma at Tanglewood (VHS)
- Faure: Piano Quartets (with Emanuel Ax, Isaac Stern, and Jaime Laredo)

1994:

- Immortal Beloved
- Chopin: Chamber Music (with Emanuel Ax (tracks 1–9), Pamela Frank (tracks 1–4), and Ewa Osinska (track 10))
- The New York Album (Albert, Bartok, Bloch)
- Greatest Hits: Gershwin
- Greatest Hits: Tchaikovsky
- Beethoven, Schumann: Piano Quartets (with Emanuel Ax, Isaac Stern, and Jaime Laredo)
- Dvořák in Prague: A Celebration

1995:

- Concertos from the New World
- Greatest Hits: Saint-Saëns
- Tackling the Monster: Marsalis on Practice (VHS)
- Brahms, Beethoven, Mozart: Clarinet Trios (with Emanuel Ax and Richard Stoltzman)
- The Essential Yo-Yo Ma

1996:

- Premieres: Cello Concertos by Danielpour, Kirchner and Rouse
- Schubert and Boccherini String Quintets
- Lieberson: King Gesar | Corigliano: Phantasmagoria (with Emanuel Ax (all tracks), tracks 1-7: Omar Ebrahim, Peter Serkin, András Adorján, Deborah Marshall, William Purvis, David Taylor, Stefan Huge, and Peter Lieberson)
- Appalachia Waltz
- Schubert: Trout Quintet; Arpeggione Sonata (with Emanuel Ax, Pamela Frank (tracks 1–5), Rebecca Young (tracks 1–5), Edgar Meyer (tracks 1–5), and Barbara Bonney (track 9))

1997:

- Soul of the Tango, music of Ástor Piazzolla
- Liberty!
- The Tango Lesson
- Seven Years in Tibet
- Symphony 1997
- Mozart: The Piano Quartets (with Emanuel Ax, Isaac Stern, and Jaime Laredo)
- From Ordinary Things
- Goldschmidt: The Concertos

1998:

- John Tavener: The Protecting Veil
- Erich Wolfgang Korngold/ Schmidt: Music for Strings and Piano Left Hand
- Inspired by Bach: "Falling Down Stairs" -- Cello Suite No.3
- Inspired by Bach
- Inspired by Bach: "Struggle For Hope" -- Cello Suite No.5
- Inspired by Bach: "The Music Garden" -- Cello Suite No.1
- Inspired by Bach: "Sarabande" -- Cello Suite No.4
- Inspired by Bach: "The Sound of the Carceri" -- Cello Suite No.2
- Inspired by Bach: "Six Gestures" -- Cello Suite No.6

1999:

- John Williams Greatest Hits 1969–1999
- My First 79 Years
- Solo
- Brahms: Piano Concerto No.2, Cello Sonata Op.78
- Lulie the Iceberg
- Songs and Dances
- Franz Joseph Haydn
- Simply Baroque (with Ton Koopman and the Amsterdam Baroque Orchestra)
- Dvořák: Piano Quartet No.2 | Brahms: Sonata for Piano and Cello in D major, op. 78 (with Emanuel Ax, Isaac Stern (tracks 1–4), and Jaime Laredo (tracks 1–4))

2000:

- Inspired by Bach, Volume 2 (DVD)
- Inspired by Bach, Volume 3 (DVD)
- Tan Dun: Crouching Tiger, Hidden Dragon
- Inspired by Bach, Volume 1 (DVD)
- Corigliano: Phantasmagoria (The Fantasy Album)
- Simply Baroque II (with Ton Koopman and the Amsterdam Baroque Orchestra)
- Appalachian Journey Live in Concert (VHS and DVD)
- Appalachian Journey (with Edgar Meyer and Mark O'Connor)
- Dvořák: Piano Quartet No.2, Sonatina in G, Romantic Pieces

2001:

- Classic Yo-Yo
- Classical Hits
- Heartland: An Appalachian Anthology

2002:

- Naqoyqatsi: Original Motion Picture Soundtrack composed by Philip Glass
- Yo-Yo Ma Plays the Music of John Williams
- Silk Road Ensemble: Silk Road Journeys: When Strangers Meet
- Meyer and Bottesini Concertos (with Edgar Meyer (tracks 1–3): Concerto for Cello and Double Bass)

2003:

- Paris - La Belle Époque
- Master and Commander: Original Motion Picture Soundtrack
- Obrigado Brazil

2004:

- The Dvořák Album
- Vivaldi's Cello
- Obrigado Brazil Live
- Silk Road Ensemble: Silk Road Journeys: Beyond the Horizon

2005:

- Yo-Yo Ma Plays Ennio Morricone, arranged and conducted by Ennio Morricone
- Memoirs of a Geisha (soundtrack) (with Itzhak Perlman) (composed and conducted by John Williams)
- The Essential Yo-Yo Ma

2006:

- Strauss: Cello Sonata in F Major, Op. 6, TrV 115 - Britten: Cello Sonata in C Major, Op. 65

2007:

- Appassionato
- Dvořák in Prague: a Celebration (DVD)

2008:

- Silk Road Ensemble: New Impossibilities
- Songs of Joy & Peace
- The Bach Cello Suites
- Songs of Joy & Peace

2009:

- "Cinema Paradiso" on Chris Botti in Boston
- 30 Years Outside the Box—Box set includes two bonus disks with various previously unreleased recordings

2010:

- Mendelssohn: Piano Trios and Songs without Words | Beethoven Ghost Piano Trio (with Emanuel Ax, Itzhak Perlman (tracks 1–8), Pamela Frank (track 14))

2011:

- The Goat Rodeo Sessions (with Stuart Duncan, Edgar Meyer, and Chris Thile)

2012:

- Bach: Unaccompanied Cello Suites
- Concertos for the New World
- Appalachian Journey
- Vivaldi's Cello
- Yo-Yo Ma Plays Ennio Morricone
- Saint-Saëns, Lalo: Cello Concertos

2013:

- Yo-Yo Ma Plays Cello Masterworks

2014:

- Obrigado Brazil

2015:

- Before This World (with James Taylor)
- Songs from the Arc of Life (with Kathryn Stott)
- Strauss: Don Quixote, Op. 35 & Schoenberg: Concerto in D Major for Cello and Orchestra
- Dvorák: Cello Concerto; Silent Woods; Rondo
- Dvorák In Prague: A Celebration
- Seven Years in Tibet
- Simply Baroque II
- Yo-Yo Ma Plays The Music of John Williams
- Schubert: Trout Quintet; Arpeggione Sonata; Die Forelle
- Schubert, Boccherini: String Quintets
- Solo
- Paris - La Belle Époque
- Saint-Saens: Carnival of the Animals
- Crouching Tiger, Hidden Dragon - Original Motion Picture Soundtrack
- Yo-Yo Ma - The Classical Cello Collection

2016:

- Yo-Yo Ma & Silk Road Ensemble: Sing Me Home
- Schumann: Cello Concerto; Adagio & Allegro; Fantasiestücke

2017:

- Yo-Yo Ma Plays Bach
- Brigitte Klassik zum Genießen: Yo-Yo Ma

2018

- Six Evolutions - Bach: Cello Suites
- Yo-Yo Ma Plays Bach & Boccherini
- Six Evolutions - Bach: Cello Suites
- Salonen Cello Concerto

2019:

- Emanuel Ax & Yo-Yo Ma - A Celebration

2020:

- Beethoven: Triple Concerto & Symphony No. 7 (with Anne-Sophie Mutter and Daniel Barenboim)
- Not Our First Goat Rodeo (with Stuart Duncan, Edgar Meyer, and Chris Thile)
- Songs of Comfort and Hope

2021:

- Hope Amid Tears - Beethoven: Cello Sonatas

2022:

- Beethoven for Three: Symphonies Nos. 2 & 5 (with Emanuel Ax and Leonidas Kavakos)
- Beethoven for Three: Symphony No. 6 “Pastorale” and Op. 1, No. 3 (with Emanuel Ax and Leonidas Kavakos)

2024:

- Beethoven for Three: Symphony No. 4 and Op. 97 "Archduke" (with Emanuel Ax and Leonidas Kavakos)
