= The Lady from Trévelez =

The Lady from Trévelez (Spanish:La señorita de Trevélez) may refer to:

- The Lady from Trévelez (play), a 1916 play by Carlos Arniches
- The Lady from Trévelez (film), a 1935 film directed by Edgar Neville

== See also ==
- Calle Mayor (1956), another adaptation of the play
