= List of Spanish films of 1961 =

A list of films produced in Spain in 1961 (see 1961 in film).

== 1961 ==
Title	Director	Cast	Genre	Notes
1961
Darling	Rafael Gil	Vicente Parra, Marianne Hold, Manolo Morán	Comedy	Co-production with West Germany
Festival	César Fernández Ardavín	Judith Dornys, Paul Hubschmid, Malila Sandoval, Julio Núñez	Drama, Romance	Co-production with West Germany
Patricia mía	Enrique Carreras	Carlos Estrada, Susana Canales, Julio Peña, José Isbert	Romantic comedy	Co-production with Argentina
Viridiana	Luis Buñuel	Silvia Pinal, Fernando Rey, Francisco Rabal, Lola Gaos	Drama	Mexican production. Palme d'Or winner at the 1961 Cannes Film Festival; banned in Spain until 1977
Ha llegado un ángel	Luis Lucia	Marisol, Isabel Garcés, Carlos Larrañaga	Drama, Musical	
Plácido	Luis García Berlanga	José Luis López Vázquez, Cassen	Black comedy	Academy Award nominee and entered into the 1962 Cannes Film Festival
Vampiresas 1930	Jesús Franco	Mikaela, Antonio Ozores, Yves Massard	Musical comedy	
