= Ontañón =

Ontañón is a surname. Notable people with the surname include:

- Santiago Ontañón (1903–1989), Spanish actor and art director
- Sara Ontañón (1907–1968), Spanish film editor
