= La gitana =

La gitana (Spanish, 'the gypsy woman') may refer to:

== Fictional characters ==
- La gitana, a fictional character in the 1907 silent film Gitane by Gaston Velle
- La gitana, a fictional character in Heart of Gold (1923 film)
- La gitana, a fictional character in the 1994 Cuban comedy film The Elephant and the Bicycle

== Music ==
- La Gitana, a 1838 musical work by Filippo Taglioni
- "La Gitana", an 1849 song by Joseph O'Kelly
- "La Gitana", a 1917 musical piece by Fritz Kreisler, after an 18th-century Arabo-Spanish Romani song
- La Gitana, a waltz by Ernest Bucalossi (1863–1933)
- "La Gitana", a song by Juan Gabriel and Rocío Dúrcal from the 1997 album Juntos Otra Vez
- "La Gitana", a song by Wisin from the 2004 album El Sobreviviente
- "La Gitana", a 2007 single by Emina Jahović
- "La Gitana", a song by Yo-Yo Ma and Kathryn Stott from the 2015 album Songs from the Arc of Life

== Paintings ==
- La Gitana, a 1922 painting by Dorothy Stevens
- La Gitana, a 1936 painting by Henry Hanke
- La Gitana, a 1963 painting by Maria Teresa Romero

== Other uses ==
- La Gitana, a manzanilla sherry by Hidalgo
- "La Gitana", a love poem by occultist Aleister Crowley in Konx Om Pax, 1907
- La Gitana, the 2004–05 shirt sponsor of Sevilla FC
- La Gitana, a steam yacht launched in 1881

== See also ==
- The Gypsy and the King (La gitana y el rey), a 1946 Spanish film
