= Vampiresas 1930 =

- Directed by: Jesús Franco
- Screenplay by: Jesús Franco
- Story by: María del Carmen Martínez Román; Pío Ballesteros; Jesús Franco
- Starring: Mikaela; Antonio Ozores; Yves Massard; Lina Morgan
- Cinematography: Eloy Mella
- Edited by: Alfonso Santacana
- Music by: José Pagán; Antonio Ramírez Ángel
- Production companies: Hispamer Film; CIFESA
- Release date: 29 May 1961 (Burgos)
- Country: Spain
- Budget: 4.56 million pesetas

Vampiresas 1930 (volando hacia la fama) (transl. Female Vamps 1930 – Flying to Fame) is a 1961 Spanish musical comedy film directed by Jesús Franco. The film is about two musicians, Tony who gets the attention of a silent film star and Daniel who falls for a dancer. The four work together until they find themselves out of work and begin performing as a jazz band. The four suddenly get caught up in a murder racket, that was actually committed by a two gangsters who run the casino that the four play at.

Initially a project set for director Pedro Lazaga, delays on the film led it to be directed by Franco. During production, Franco re-wrote most of the script. The film was shot between November 1960 and early 1961 and was screened throughout Spain.

== Plot ==
In Paris in 1929, Dora Gootie is a glamorous silent film star and falls in love with Tony a musician who intrigues her with his ability to play the violin on set. Tony and his friend Daniel moonlight as musicians in an Italian restaurant. There, they meet Carlina, a dancer who falls in love with Daniels and moves in with them both at the "Pension de la Musique". As Tony is on the verge of breaking into the film industry with Dora, Daniel and Carolina find work as a comedy duo. Suddenly, the arrival of sound film marks the decline of the silent era, and Dora and her friends find themselves unemployed. Worse, they become suspects in the murder of Moroni, a danger shot trafficked in counterfeit money. With the police in pursuit, the four disguise themselves as a Black all-female jazz band to flee a casino which is a front for a gang of counterfeiters led by Radek and Lida, the two who were truly responsible for the death of Moroni. After Dora finds a secret room, the gangsters attempt to kill off the rest of Dora's group. The four then save themselves by tirelessly playing music until the police arrive.

== Production ==
When production on La reina del Tabarín stalled, Sergio Newman set out to produce another musical film. The script for this new film was based on an original script by María del Carmen Martínez Román, Newman's business partner at the time, and producer Pío Ballesteros. The authors sold the rights to the script to Hispamer on March 7, 1960.

The initial cast of the film was to be set of Tony Leblanc, Antonio Ozores, Mikaela, María Martín, Félix Fernández, Juan Calvo and José Luis López Vázquez with Pedro Lazaga set to direct. Like La reina del Tabarín, the project also became delayed. This led to the film being offered to Franco as one of the three titles he was on contract with Hispamer for three films. The film initially had an estimated budget of 6,931,000 pesetas. On October 29, Newman informed the ministry of several drastic changes to the project which resulted in the delay, including Franco rewriting the entire script himself, leaving almost nothing from the original script. Other changes involved the cast, with Leblanc being replaced by Yves Massard and Vázquez being replaced by Manuel Alexandre. As Martín was replaced by Mikaela, the role of Carolina initially set for Mikaela was given to Lina Morgan. The film was developed under the title Volando hacia la fama.

According to the producer's official documents, filming began on November 11, 1960, while Primer Plano's column titled "Hoja de rodaje" (transl. filming sheet) said that filming began on November 21. As with La reina del Tabarín, Eurociné granted distribution in France and other French-speaking countries, and provided an advance of 60,000 francs in exchange for seven years of distribution rights. This led to additional 11-day shoot in Paris and Nice with interiors shot at Victorine Studios.

For the songs in the film, the producers purchased the rights to five songs by French Charles Trenet which were then adapted into Spanish.

Hispamer did not like the original working title, and on April 3, 1961, had it change dto Vampiresas 1930, a title which references three films by Warner Bros.: Gold Diggers of 1933 (1933), Gold Diggers of 1935 (1935), and Gold Diggers of 1937 which were each released in Spain as Vampiresas 1933, Vampiresas 1936, Vampiresas 1937 respectively. The film's final budget was estimated to be 4,560,000 pesetas.

== Release ==
Vampiresas 1930 premiered in Burgos, Spain at Cine Cordón on May 29, 1961. This was followed by other screenings in Spain, including in Valencia on July 24, Oviedo on August 31, Sevilla on September 29, and León on October 10. The film would not be released in Madrid or Barcelona until 1962. After a screening Madrid, magazine Cine-Aseor predicted the film would be a commercial success, particular with "popular audiences or fans of the genre".

The film was released outside Spain, such as in Portugal on December 21, 1962, and in the Southern regions of France on September 4, 1963, as Certain les prèfėrent noires (transl. Some Like Them Black). This French version was also screened on French Canadian television in 1968.

== Reception ==
In Spain, Cine-Aseor said the film's story was spoiled by a "wishy-washy script" while still stating that "it is undoubtedly funny, entertaining and it provides a colourful pastime with its parade of musical variety shows and vaudeville numbers." and said Lina Morgan was the stand out actor. In ABC, the newspaper described the film as being a "spoof of a spoof" and that the film "gives the impression that those who took part in it had a lot of fun during the filming."
