= Antoñita Colomé =

Spanish actress (1912–2005)

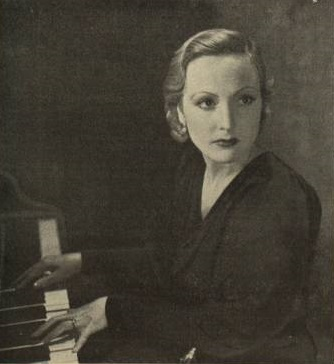
- Colomé in 1935
- Born: 18 February 1912; Seville, Andalucía, Spain
- Died: 28 August 2005 (aged 93); Madrid, Spain
- Other name: Antonia Colomé Ruiz
- Occupation: Actress
- Years active: 1931-1988 (film)

Antoñita Colomé (February 18, 1912 – August 28, 2005) was a Spanish film actress. She was a popular star during the Spanish Republic, appearing in films such as World Crisis (1934).

== Selected filmography ==
- The Pure Truth (1931)
- A Gentleman in Tails (1931)
- Mercedes (1933)
- The Man Who Laughed at Love (1933)
- World Crisis (1934)
- The Wicked Carabel (1935)
- The Dancer and the Worker (1936)
- The Lady from Trévelez (1936)
- A Woman in Danger (1936)
- The Reluctant Hero (1941)
- The Wheel of Life (1942)
- Idyll in Mallorca (1943)
- The Gypsy and the King (1946)

== Bibliography ==
- Bentley, Bernard. A Companion to Spanish Cinema. Boydell & Brewer 2008.
