= Tragic Return =

1952 film

- Directed by: Pier Luigi Faraldo
- Written by: Leo Bomba; Giuseppe Mangione; Sergio Pugliese; Ermanno Randi
- Produced by: Eugenio Fontana; Giacinto Solito
- Starring: Doris Duranti; Marcello Mastroianni; Franca Marzi
- Cinematography: Alvaro Mancori
- Edited by: Giacinto Solito
- Music by: Costantino Ferri
- Production company: Produzione Fontana
- Distributed by: Titanus
- Release date: 13 June 1952
- Running time: 98 minutes
- Country: Italy
- Language: Italian

Tragic Return (Italian: Tragico ritorno) is a 1952 Italian melodrama film directed by Pier Luigi Faraldo and starring Doris Duranti, Marcello Mastroianni and Franca Marzi. It was shot at the Pisorno Studios in Tirrenia. The film's sets were designed by the art director Giorgio Ansoldi. It earned 92 million lire at the Italian box office.

== Synopsis ==
Marco, after some years in a prisoner of war camp, returns to his home in Livorno to find his wife Giovanna married to another man and their son doesn't know who he is. Suicidal he is encouraged by Elisa a young woman who manages a beachfront business with her father. Marco plans on emigrating to Argentina but to raise the money he becomes involved in robberies.

== Cast ==
- Doris Duranti as Elisa
- Marcello Mastroianni as Marco
- Franca Marzi as Donna Carmela - Nicola's girlfriend
- Fosca Freda as Giovanna
- Dante Maggio as Nicola
- Raffaele Pindinelli
- Paolo Dola
- Benedetta Rutili

== Bibliography ==
- Chiti, Roberto & Poppi, Roberto. Dizionario del cinema italiano: Dal 1945 al 1959. Gremese Editore, 1991.
