= The Chosen Ones (1964 film) =

1964 film

- Directed by: Tulio Demicheli
- Written by: Pedro Mario Herrero
- Starring: Rafael Guerrero; Mayra Rey; Félix Lumbreras
- Cinematography: José F. Aguayo
- Edited by: Sara Ontañón
- Music by: José Solá
- Production company: Profilmes
- Release date: 15 June 1964
- Running time: 88 minutes
- Country: Spain
- Language: Spanish

The Chosen Ones (Spanish:Los elegidos) is a 1964 Spanish film directed by Tulio Demicheli and starring Rafael Guerrero, Mayra Rey and Félix Lumbreras.

The film's sets were designed by the art director Enrique Alarcón.

== Cast ==
- Rafael Guerrero as Juan Sánchez
- Mayra Rey as Aurelia
- Félix Lumbreras as Paco
- Manuel Manzaneque as Miguel García
- José Bódalo as Padre de Miguel
- José Calvo as Apoderado
- Manuel Guitián
- Lucy Cabrera as Madre de Miguel
- Ángel Álvarez

== Bibliography ==
- John King & Nissa Torrents. The Garden of Forking Paths: Argentine Cinema. British Film Institute, 1988.
