= Sergio Pugliese =

Italian writer and journalist (1908–1965)

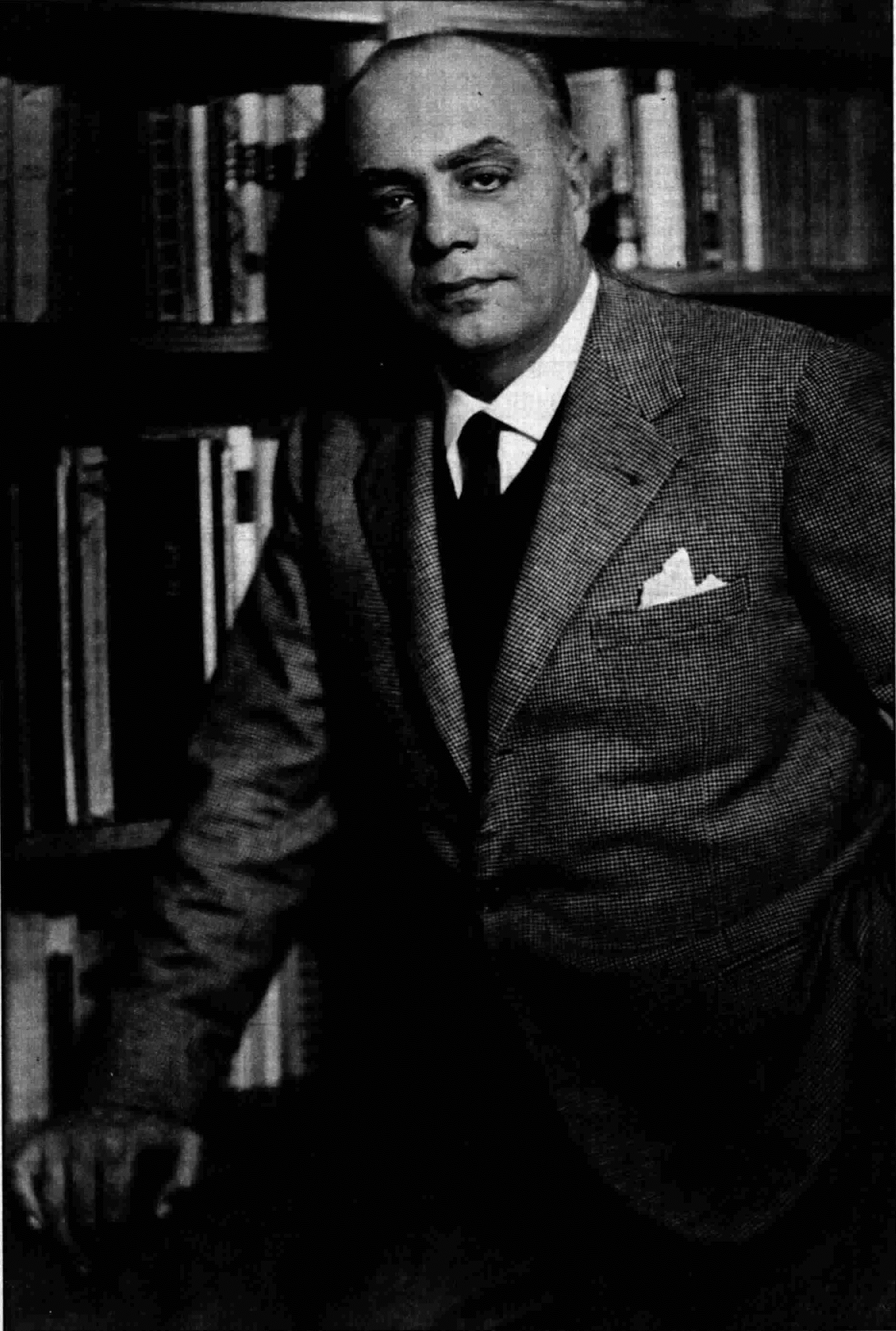
- Born: 12 March 1908; Ivrea, Piedmont, Kingdom of Italy
- Died: 5 December 1965 (aged 57); Rome, Lazio, Italy
- Occupations: Writer, journalist
- Years active: 1940–1961 (screenwriter)

Sergio Pugliese (12 March 1908 – 5 December 1965) was an Italian screenwriter, playwright and journalist. He was employed by the Italian state broadcaster RAI and in 1955, he made the original proposal that led eventually to the establishment of the Eurovision Song Contest.

== Selected filmography ==
- The Reluctant Hero (1941)
- Torrents of Spring (1942)
- The White Angel (1943)
- Men of the Mountain (1943)
- Mist on the Sea (1944)
- Barrier to the North (1950)
- Tragic Return (1952)
- Il Mattatore (1960)

== Bibliography ==
- Goble, Alan. The Complete Index to Literary Sources in Film. Walter de Gruyter, 1999.
