= The Goat Rodeo Sessions =

Studio album by Yo-Yo Ma, Stuart Duncan, Edgar Meyer, Chris Thile
- Released: October 24, 2011
- Recorded: June 12–15, August 8–12, 2011 The Barn
- Genre: Bluegrass, classical
- Length: 57:18
- Label: Sony Masterworks

Yo-Yo Ma, Stuart Duncan, Edgar Meyer, Chris Thile chronology
The Goat Rodeo Sessions (2011)	Not Our First Goat Rodeo (2020)

Professional ratings
Review scores
Source	Rating
Allmusic	3.5/5 stars

The Goat Rodeo Sessions is a 2011 collaborative album by Stuart Duncan, Yo-Yo Ma, Edgar Meyer and Chris Thile, featuring Aoife O'Donovan. The album won the 2013 Grammy Award for Best Folk Album and the Grammy for Best Engineered Album, Non-Classical.

== Background ==
Meyer previously collaborated with Ma on Appalachia Waltz and Appalachian Journey, and with Thile on Edgar Meyer and Chris Thile. In 2008, Meyer and Thile played on Ma's Songs of Joy and Peace and the three discussed a future collaboration. Along with Duncan, they held their first rehearsal at Ma's house. The compositions are credited to Meyer, Thile, and Duncan—with "Here and Heaven" co-written with Aoife O'Donovan.

The term goat rodeo refers to a chaotic event where many things must go right for the situation to work, a reference to the unusual and challenging aspects of blending classical and bluegrass music. Yo-Yo Ma described a goat rodeo, saying: "If there were forks in the road and each time there was a fork, the right decision was made, then you get to a goat rodeo."

On January 31, 2012, Ma, Meyer, Thile, Duncan, and O'Donovan played their first public concert at the House of Blues in Boston, presented by the Celebrity Series of Boston. The show was streamed in real time to movie theaters in the United States. In addition to songs from the album, they played Johann Sebastian Bach's Gamba Sonata Number 1 Movement 4, Fiddle Medley, and All Through The Night. They released part of the concert as an EP, The Goat Rodeo Sessions Live from the House of Blues, on February 7, 2012. A DVD of the concert, The Goat Rodeo Sessions Live, was released on May 29, 2012.

According to Stuart Duncan, the piece "13:8" isn't a reference to time signature, but rather to the Bible verse Hebrews 13:8. At a concert at Tanglewood on August 15, 2013, Duncan told a story about an airline pilot who, every time he was given his dinner by the flight attendant, said, "Hebrews 13:8". He finally looked it up and learned that the Bible verse read: "Jesus Christ, the same yesterday, today, and tomorrow." He said that that was the basis for the title, and that music students are wasting their time looking for that time signature within the piece.

Two bonus tracks, Mostly Six Eight and Parallax, were released as a single, More from the Goat Rodeo Sessions, on February 29, 2012.

The album debuted at No. 1 on the Billboard Classical, Classical Crossover, and Bluegrass charts and reached No. 18 on the Billboard 200. It has sold 160,000 copies in the United States.

On February 10, 2013, the album won the Grammy Award for Best Folk Album and the Grammy Award for Best Engineered Album, Non-Classical.

In August 2019, Meyer shared photographs on social media of the group, including O'Donovan, in studio recording new material. On June 19, 2020, the group released a second album, titled Not Our First Goat Rodeo.

== Track listing ==
All tracks are written by Stuart Duncan, Edgar Meyer, and Chris Thile except where noted.

No.	Title	Writer(s)	Length
1.	"Attaboy"		5:42
2.	"Quarter Chicken Dark"		4:47
3.	"Helping Hand"		4:32
4.	"Where's My Bow?"		5:29
5.	"Here and Heaven"	Stuart Duncan, Edgar Meyer, Aoife O'Donovan, Chris Thile	3:53
6.	"Franz and the Eagle"		6:53
7.	"Less Is Moi"		7:27
8.	"Hill Justice"		4:29
9.	"No One but You"		3:54
10.	"13:8"		5:54
11.	"Goat Rodeo"		4:18

== Personnel ==
- Yo-Yo Ma – cello
- Stuart Duncan – fiddle, banjo, mandolin
- Edgar Meyer – bass, piano, gamba
- Chris Thile – mandolin, guitar, fiddle, gamba, vocals on tracks 5, 9
- Aoife O'Donovan – vocals on tracks 5, 9
- Richard King – engineer
- Steve Carver – piano technician
- Steven Epstein – producer
