= Vivaldi's Cello =

Vivaldi’s Cello

Studio album by Yo-Yo Ma and the Amsterdam Baroque Orchestra
- Released: 2004
- Recorded: November 17–20, 2003
- Venue: Leiden, Netherlands
- Studio: De Stadsgehoorzaal
- Genre: Classical, baroque
- Label: Sony Classical Records
- Producer: Tini Mathot

Yo-Yo Ma chronology
The Dvořák Album (2004)	Vivaldi’s Cello (2004)	Obrigado Brazil Live (2004)

Professional ratings
Review scores
Source	Rating
AllMusic	4/5 stars

Vivaldi’s Cello is an album by Yo-Yo Ma and the Amsterdam Baroque Orchestra with Ton Koopman as conductor, released in 2004 on Sony Classical Records. It contains various arrangements taken from Antonio Vivaldi's operas and oratorios.

== Track listing ==
Side A
No.	Title	Length
1.	"Concerto in G minor for 2 Cellos, Strings and Basso Continuo, RV 531" "I. Allegro"	3:18
2.	"II. Largo" (Violin solo performed on cello)	2:31
3.	"III. Allegro"	3:10
4.	"The Four Seasons - Concerto for Violin, Strings and Basso Continuo, "Winter" Op. 8, No. 4, RV 297" "II. Largo"	1:45
5.	"Concerto in B-flat Major for Cello, Strings and Basso Continuo, RV 423" "I. Allegro"	3:30
6.	"II. Largo"	2:20
7.	"III. Allegro"	3:34
8.	""Cosi Sugl' Occhi Miei" from La Fida Ninfa, RV 714"	2:53
9.	"Concerto for Viola d'amore, Lute and Orchestra, RV 540" "I. Allegro"	5:22
10.	"II. Largo"	2:31
11.	"III. Allegro"	3:06
12.	""La Gloria Del Mio Sangue" from Giustino, RV 717"	2:49
13.	"Concerto in C minor for Cello, Strings and Basso Continuo, RV 401" "I. Allegro non molto"	4:16
14.	"II. Adagio"	2:58
15.	"III. Allegro ma non molto"	2:58
16.	""Noli, O Cara, Te Adorantis" from Juditha Triumphans, RV 644"	5:00
17.	""Laudamus Te" from Gloria, RV 589"	2:26
18.	""Quanto Magis Generosa" from Juditha Triumphans, RV 644"	10:14
19.	""Dite Oihme" from La Fida Ninfa, RV 714"	2:23

== Personnel ==
- Yo-Yo Ma - cello

The Amsterdam Baroque Orchestra

- Ton Koopman - conductor, harpsichord, organ
- Margaret Faultless - violin
- Foskien Kooistra - violin
- Catherine Martin - violin
- Fanny Pestalozzi - violin
- David Rabinovich - violin
- Alida Schat - violin
- Carla Marotta - violin
- Silvia Schweinberger - violin
- Ruth Slater - violin
- Katherine McGillivray - viola
- Jane Rogers - viola
- Jonathan Manson - cello
- Catherine Jones - cello
- Alberto Rasi - double bass
- Alfredo Bernardini - oboe
- Michel Henry - oboe
- Woulter Verschuren - bassoon
- Mike Fentross - lute

Production

- Producer: Tini Mathot
- Arrangement: Ton Koopman
- Engineers: Adriaan Versteijnen
- Photography: Stephen Danelian

== Charts ==
Album

Year	Chart	Position
2004	Billboard 200	175
2004	Billboard Classical Albums	2
