= A Woman in Danger =

- Directed by: José Santugini
- Written by: Carlos Fernández Cuenca; José Santugini
- Starring: Enrique del Campo; Antoñita Colomé; Alberto Romea
- Cinematography: Henri Barreyre
- Music by: José María Gil Serrano
- Production company: Atlantic Films
- Release date: 2 March 1936
- Running time: 85 minutes
- Country: Spain
- Language: Spanish

A Woman in Danger (Spanish:Una mujer en peligro) is a 1936 Spanish crime film directed by José Santugini and starring Enrique del Campo, Antoñita Colomé and Alberto Romea.

== Cast ==
- Enrique del Campo as Fernando Herrero
- Antoñita Colomé as María Isabel
- Alberto Romea as Dr. Arnal
- Santiago Ontañón as Ricardo
- Júlio Castro 'Castrito' as Agapito
- Pablo Álvarez Rubio as Prof. Layne
- Mariana Larrabeiti as Lucrecia
- José Martín as Jerommo
- Manuel Vico as Maitre
- Cándida Folgado as Abuelita
- Felisa Carreras as Mercedes
- Cándida Losada as Laura
- Luisa Sala

== Bibliography ==
- Bentley, Bernard. A Companion to Spanish Cinema. Boydell & Brewer, 2008.
