= A Missionary =

1955 film

- Directed by: Maurice Cloche
- Written by: Maurice Cloche
- Produced by: Maurice Cloche; André Halley des Fontaines
- Starring: Yves Massard; Marie-France Planeze; René Blancard
- Cinematography: Claude Renoir
- Edited by: Christian Gaudin
- Music by: Michel Michelet
- Production companies: Les Films Maurice Cloche; Union Générale Cinématographique
- Distributed by: L'Alliance Générale de Distribution Cinématographique
- Release date: 2 December 1955
- Running time: 98 minutes
- Country: France
- Language: French

A Missionary (French: Un missionnaire) is a 1955 French drama film directed by Maurice Cloche and starring Yves Massard, Marie-France Planeze and René Blancard. It was shot in Guinea and Cameroon. The film is in Eastmancolor.

== Cast ==
- Yves Massard as Père Jean Maurel
- Marie-France Planèze as Geneviève
- René Blancard as Rouhaut
- Albert Préjean as Brother Timothée
- Jacques Berthier as Père Duval
- Charles Vanel as Père Gauthier
- Habib Benglia
- Anthony Carretier
- Claude Cerval
- Jean Lanier
- Darling Légitimus
- Roger Monteaux
- Johnny Rieu
- Roger Saget

== Bibliography ==
- Crisp, Colin. French Cinema—A Critical Filmography: Volume 2, 1940–1958. Indiana University Press, 2015.
