= Carnival Day =

1960 film

- Directed by: Rafael J. Salvia
- Written by: Miguel Martín; Rafael J. Salvia
- Produced by: Jorge Tusell
- Starring: José Isbert; Pilar Cansino; Javier García
- Cinematography: Antonio Macasoli
- Edited by: Sara Ontañón
- Music by: José García Bernal
- Production company: Estela Films
- Release date: 23 May 1960
- Running time: 92 minutes
- Country: Spain
- Language: Spanish

Carnival Day (Spanish: Días de feria) is a 1960 Spanish comedy film directed by Rafael J. Salvia.

== Cast ==
- Manuel Arbó
- Pedro Beltrán as Isidoro
- Juan Bienvenida
- Pilar Cansino as Rosa
- José Luis Coll
- Irene Daina as Maruxa
- Javier García as Germán
- Lola García
- Manuel Insúa
- José Isbert as Don Damián
- Tony Leblanc as Camarero
- Goyo Lebrero
- Carlos Lucas as Espectador
- José Luis López Vázquez as Figueroa
- Antonio Martinez
- Santiago Ontañón
- Gisia Paradís as Erika
- Carmen Porcel
- Joaquín Portillo 'Top'
- Jesús Puente
- Nora Samsó
- Pablo Sanz
- Josefina Serratosa
- Luis Sánchez Polack
- Ángel Álvarez
- Enrique Ávila as Antón

== Bibliography ==
- Àngel Comas. Diccionari de llargmetratges: el cinema a Catalunya durant la Segona República, la Guerra Civil i el franquisme (1930-1975). Cossetània Edicions, 2005.
