= Pilar Cansino =

Spanish actress

- Born: 18 January 1937 (age 89); Seville, Spain
- Occupation: Actress
- Years active: 1957-present

Pilar Cansino (born 18 January 1937) is a Spanish actress. She appeared in more than twenty films since 1957.

== Selected filmography ==
Year	Title	Role	Notes
1960	Carnival Day	Rosa	
1960	Litri and His Shadow	Carmela	
1963	Hercules and the Masked Rider		
1970	Cuadrilátero		
