= The Reluctant Hero =

- Directed by: Benito Perojo
- Written by: Sergio Pugliese (play); Antonio Quintero; Benito Perojo
- Produced by: Saturnino Ulargui
- Starring: Miguel Ligero; Antoñita Colomé; Alberto Romea; Manuel de Diego
- Cinematography: Theodore J. Pahle
- Edited by: Antonio Cánovas
- Music by: Fernando Moraleda
- Production company: Ufisa
- Distributed by: D.C. Films
- Release date: 12 April 1941
- Running time: 88 minutes
- Country: Spain
- Language: Spanish

The Reluctant Hero (Spanish: Héroe a la fuerza) is a 1941 Spanish comedy film directed by Benito Perojo and starring Miguel Ligero, Antoñita Colomé and Alberto Romea. The film is based on a play by Sergio Pugliese. It is stylistically similar to the White Telephone films of Italy.

== Cast ==
- Miguel Ligero
- Antoñita Colomé
- Alberto Romea
- Manuel de Diego
- Lily Vicenti
- Pedro Fernández Cuenca
- Fernando Porredón
- Pedro Valdivieso
- Fernando Vallejo
- Pedro Chicote

== Bibliography ==
- Bentley, Bernard. A Companion to Spanish Cinema. Boydell & Brewer, 2008.
