= Mist on the Sea =

1944 Italian film

- Directed by: Marcello Pagliero; Hans Hinrich
- Written by: Gherardo Gherardi; Sergio Pugliese
- Produced by: Fortunato Misiano
- Starring: Viveca Lindfors; Gustav Diessl; Umberto Spadaro
- Cinematography: Václav Vích
- Edited by: Otello Colangeli
- Music by: Alexandre Derevitsky
- Production companies: Film Bassoli; Larius Film; S.A.C.C.I.
- Distributed by: Titanus
- Release date: May 1944
- Running time: 83 minutes
- Country: Italy
- Language: Italian

Mist on the Sea (Italian: Nebbie sul mare) is a 1944 Italian drama film directed by Marcello Pagliero and Hans Hinrich and starring Viveca Lindfors, Gustav Diessl and Umberto Spadaro. The film's sets were designed by the art director Salvo D'Angelo.

== Synopsis ==
Italian couple Maria and Pietro Rosati live in Brazil, where they manage an estate. One day Maria is sexually assaulted, and her husband kills the preparator. Pietro is pursued by the police and is shot and tumbles into a river. Maria is charged as an accomplice, but after a lengthy trial she is acquitted. A few years later she is working as an assistant to a doctor at a research institute. They fall in love and marry, but when Brazil enters the Second World War all Italian citizens are expelled from the country, and they catch the last available ship for Italy. To Maria's shock, they discover Pietro working as a stoker in the engine room; he miraculously survived his fall into the river and has been laying low to avoid arrest. He demands that his wife return to him, but she says she is pregnant and loves her second husband, even if the marriage is technically invalid. When the ship hits a mine, Pietro nobly sacrifices himself by helping Maria and the doctor into a lifeboat and then cutting the rope.

== Cast ==
- Viveca Lindfors as Maria Rosati
- Gustav Diessl as Pietro Rosati
- Otello Toso as Il dottore Leonardo Monti
- Umberto Spadaro as Il fuochista
- Claudio Ermelli as Silva
- Carmen Navascués as Dolores, la ballerina
- Adele Garavaglia as La governante di Leonardo
- Guido Morisi as Ruiz, il direttore del laboratorio sieroterapico
- Carlo Duse as Lopez, il creditore
- Mario Brizzolari as Un membro della Commissione di Sanità
- Aristide Garbini as Il capitano della nave
- Giulio Battiferri as Il direttore della ditta commerciale
- Bruno Smith as L'ufficiale sulla nave
- Stefano Sibaldi as Il suonatore di contrabasso
- Roberto Manzi as Il vicecomandante della nave

== Bibliography ==
- Qvist, Per Olov & von Bagh, Peter. Guide to the Cinema of Sweden and Finland. Greenwood Publishing Group, 2000
