= The Wicked Carabel =

1935 film

- Directed by: Edgar Neville
- Written by: Wenceslao Fernández Flórez (novel); Edgar Neville
- Produced by: Saturnino Ulargui
- Starring: Antoñita Colomé; Antonio Vico
- Cinematography: Willy Goldberger
- Edited by: Johanna Rosinski
- Music by: Manfred Gurlitt
- Production company: Ufilms
- Release date: 7 December 1935
- Running time: 89 minutes
- Country: Spain
- Language: Spanish

The Wicked Carabel (Spanish: El malvado Carabel) is a 1935 Spanish comedy film directed by Edgar Neville and starring Antoñita Colomé and Antonio Vico. It was based on a novel by Wenceslao Fernández Flórez.

== Cast ==
- Antoñita Colomé as Germana
- Antonio Vico as Amaro Carabel
- Francisco Alarcon as Banquero Aznar
- Juan Barajas as Azpitarte
- Mary Cruz as Srta. Robledillo
- Rafael María de Labra
- José María Lado
- Cándida Losada as Silvia
- Juana Mansó as Dueña de la pensión
- Consuelo Medina
- Alejandro Nolla as Banquero Bofarull
- Antonio Palacios as Doctor Enríquez
- Pepito Ripoli as El niño
- Luisa Sala
- Elías Sanjuán as El huésped
- Ana de Siria as Sra. Robledillo
- Amalia Sánchez Ariño as Doña Nieves
- Juan Torres Roca as Olalla

== Bibliography ==
- Mira Nouselles, Alberto (2010). The A to Z of Spanish Cinema. Rowman & Littlefield. p. 431. ISBN 9780810876224.
