= Yves Massard =

French actor (1923–1996)

- Born: June 15, 1923; Saarbrücken, Territory of the Saar Basin
- Died: March 1, 1996 (aged 72); Saint-Raphaël, Var, France
- Occupation: Actor
- Years active: 1946-1985 (film)

Yves Massard (1923–1996) was a German-born French film actor.

== Filmography ==
Year	Title	Role	Notes
1946	The Sea Rose		
1948	Ruy Blas	Bit part	Uncredited
1948	The Eagle with Two Heads		Uncredited
1948	Jean de la Lune		Uncredited
1951	Skipper Next to God	Un passager juif	Uncredited
1952	Leathernose	Un gentilhomme	
1953	Je suis un mouchard	Henri Brenner	
1953	Their Last Night	Le codétenu du car de police	Uncredited
1954	La Cage aux souris	Franck	
1955	A Missionary	Père Jean Maurel	
1956	Calle Mayor	Federico Rivas	
1956	Suspicion	Dr. Delacroix	
1957	Adorables Démons	M Charles	
1957	S.O.S. Noronha	Froment	
1957	The Suspects	Inspecteur Louis Vignon	
1957	The Night of Suspects	Inspecteur Duret	
1957	Anime bruciate		
1958	La Tour, prends garde!	Le marquis François de Marmande	
1959	Los cobardes	Jefe	
1960	À pleines mains	L'inspecteur Pierre Chevillon	
1960	Quai du Point-du-Jour	François	
1960	Le pain des Jules	Pascal l'Élégant	
1960	Amour, autocar et boîtes de nuit	Daniel - un reporter	
1960	Queen of the Tabarin Club	Fernando	
1961	Les hommes veulent vivre	Yves Chardin	
1962	Los culpables	Dr. Andrés Laplaza	
1962	Vampiresas 1930	Tony Fabien	
1963	Seul... à corps perdu	Laurent Bricourt	
1969	La mujer escarlata	Bit part	Uncredited
1970	Le passager de la pluie		
1970	Children of Mata Hari	Un inspecteur à la filature	Uncredited
1978	Once in Paris...	1st Man at Party	
1981	Les folies d'Élodie	Georges	
1982	Aphrodite	Baron Orloff	
1982	On n'est pas sorti de l'auberge	M. Maréchal	
1985	Brigade des moeurs		(final film role)

== Bibliography ==
- Labanyi, Jo & Pavlović, Tatjana. A Companion to Spanish Cinema. John Wiley & Sons, 2012.
