= The Red Rose (1960 film) =

- Directed by: Carlos Serrano de Osma
- Written by: Manuel Barrios
- Starring: Antonio Almorós
- Cinematography: Miguel Fernández Mila
- Music by: Salvador Ruiz de Luna
- Production companies: Jo Films; Visor Films
- Distributed by: Exclusivas Floralva Distribución
- Release date: 1960
- Running time: 80 minutes
- Country: Spain
- Language: Spanish

The Red Rose (Spanish: La rosa roja) is a 1960 Spanish film directed by Carlos Serrano de Osma.

== Cast ==
- Antonio Almorós
- Rafael Bardem
- Elena Espejo
- Mikaela
- Santiago Ontañón
- Luis Peña
- Pedro Porcel
- Conrado San Martín

== Bibliography ==
- Bentley, Bernard. A Companion to Spanish Cinema. Boydell & Brewer, 2008.
