= Not Our First Goat Rodeo =

2020 collaborative studio album

Studio album by Yo-Yo Ma, Stuart Duncan, Edgar Meyer, Chris Thile
- Released: June 19, 2020
- Recorded: August 2019
- Genre: Bluegrass, classical
- Length: 44:53
- Label: Sony Masterworks

Yo-Yo Ma, Stuart Duncan, Edgar Meyer, Chris Thile chronology
The Goat Rodeo Sessions (2011)	Not Our First Goat Rodeo (2020)

Professional ratings
Review scores
Source	Rating
Allmusic	4.5/5 stars

Not Our First Goat Rodeo is a 2020 collaborative album by Stuart Duncan, Yo-Yo Ma, Edgar Meyer, and Chris Thile, featuring Aoife O'Donovan. It was released on June 19, 2020.

== Background ==
On October 24, 2011, Stuart Duncan, Yo-Yo Ma, Edgar Meyer and Chris Thile (with Aoife O'Donovan) released their first album together, entitled The Goat Rodeo Sessions. The album debuted at number one on the Billboard Classical, Classical Crossover, and Bluegrass charts and reached number eighteen on the Billboard 200. It also won the Grammy Award for Best Folk Album and the Grammy Award for Best Engineered Album, Non-Classical in 2013.

The term goat rodeo refers to a chaotic event where many things must go right for the situation to work, a reference to the unusual and challenging aspects of blending classical and bluegrass music. Ma described a goat rodeo thus: "If there were forks in the road and each time there was a fork, the right decision was made, then you get to a goat rodeo."

Ma has stated in an interview that the group had the idea to make a second album in 2011, while recording The Goat Rodeo Sessions. In August 2019, Meyer shared photographs on social media of the group, including O'Donovan, in studio recording new material. On June 19 of the next year, this second album, Not Our First Goat Rodeo, was released.

On September 1, 2020, a Tiny Desk Concerts was released by NPR in which the group performed three songs from the album. Because of the COVID-19 pandemic, the musicians each recorded themselves individually from home for the set.

== Reception ==
Not Our First Goat Rodeo has received praise from reviewers, who have cited the group's virtuosity, chemistry, and ability to bend genres. Catherine Nelson of The Strad praised the album's complexity and "sheer joyfulness of expression". Writing for AllMusic, Matt Collar described the album as a "deeply engaging, often rapturous album that balances keen and studied musicality with an almost chaotic passion for group interplay". Comparing the album to The Goat Rodeo Sessions, Justin Hiltner called Not Our First Goat Rodeo "more ornery, more confident, brash, and joyously off-kilter", and said that the ensemble "feels veteran" for a second album.

The album reached number one on the Billboard Classical, Classical Crossover, and Bluegrass charts.

== Track listing ==
All tracks are written by Stuart Duncan, Edgar Meyer, and Chris Thile

No.	Title	Length
1.	"Your Coffee is a Disaster"	4:40
2.	"Waltz Whitman"	3:44
3.	"The Trappings (feat. Aoife O'Donovan)"	3:39
4.	"Every Note a Pearl (feat. Aoife O'Donovan)"	4:37
5.	"Not For Lack of Trying"	5:09
6.	"Voila!"	3:11
7.	"Scarcely Cricket"	4:46
8.	"We Were Animals (feat. Aoife O'Donovan)"	5:22
9.	"Nebbia"	4:31
10.	"757 ml"	5:08

== Personnel ==
The album features Stuart Duncan, Yo-Yo Ma, Edgar Meyer, and Chris Thile on all 10 tracks. Aoife O'Donovan appears on 3 tracks as a featured vocalist.

- Stuart Duncan – fiddle, banjo, vocals
- Yo-Yo Ma – cello
- Edgar Meyer – bass, piano
- Chris Thile – mandolin, vocals, guitar, fiddle
- Aoife O'Donovan – featured vocalist on tracks 3, 4, and 8
