= The Gypsy and the King =

1946 Spanish film

- Directed by: Manuel Bengoa
- Written by: Manuel Bengoa; Francisco Mora; Ramón Perelló
- Cinematography: César Benítez
- Music by: Juan Ruiz de Azagra
- Production company: Trébol Films
- Distributed by: DISCENTRO
- Release date: 11 April 1946
- Running time: 90 minutes
- Country: Spain
- Language: Spanish

The Gypsy and the King (Spanish:La gitana y el rey) is a 1946 Spanish film directed by Manuel Bengoa.

== Cast ==
- Antoñita Colomé
- Alfonso de Horna
- Jorge Mistral
- Julia Pachelo
- Manuel Requena
- Santiago Rivero
- Joaquín Roa

== Bibliography ==
- Eva Woods Peiró. White Gypsies: Race and Stardom in Spanish Musical Films. U of Minnesota Press, 2012.
