= The Lady from Trevélez (film) =

1936 film

The Lady from Trévelez
- Directed by: Edgar Neville
- Written by: Carlos Arniches (play); Edgar Neville
- Starring: Edmundo Barbero; Antoñita Colomé; Fernando Freyre de Andrade; María Gámez
- Cinematography: Henri Barreyre; Tamás Keményffy
- Music by: Rodolfo Halffter
- Production company: Atlantic Films
- Release date: 27 April 1936
- Country: Spain
- Language: Spanish

The Lady from Trevélez (Spanish: La señorita de Trevélez) is a 1936 Spanish drama film directed by Edgar Neville and starring Edmundo Barbero, Antoñita Colomé and Fernando Freyre de Andrade. It is based on the play of the same name by Carlos Arniches. The film was remade in 1956 under the title Calle Mayor.

== Cast ==
In alphabetical order

- Edmundo Barbero
- Antoñita Colomé
- Fernando Freyre de Andrade
- María Gámez
- Luis Heredia
- María Luisa Moneró
- Nicolás Rodríguez
- Alberto Romea
- Juan Torres Roca

== Bibliography ==
- Labanyi, Jo & Pavlović, Tatjana. A Companion to Spanish Cinema. John Wiley & Sons, 2012.
