= The Lady from Trevélez (play) =

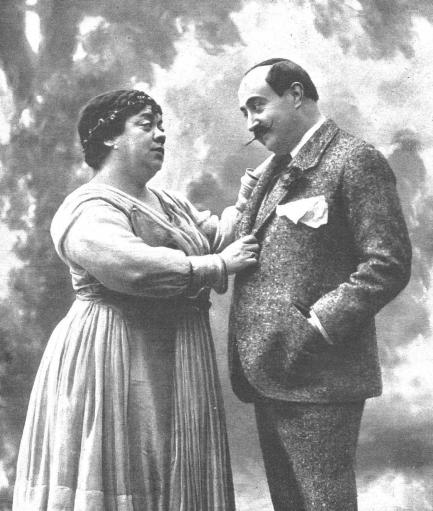
A performance of the play in 1916.

The Lady from Trevélez (Spanish:La señorita de Trevélez) is a play by the Spanish writer Carlos Arniches which was first performed in 1916.

== Film adaptations ==
- In 1935 Edgar Neville directed The Lady from Trevélez
- In 1956 Juan Antonio Bardem directed Calle Mayor
- There have also been several television versions.

== Bibliography ==
- Labanyi, Jo & Pavlović, Tatjana. A Companion to Spanish Cinema. John Wiley & Sons, 2012.
