= Songs from the Arc of Life =

Studio album by Yo-Yo Ma and Kathryn Stott
- Released: September 18, 2015
- Genre: Classical music
- Length: 1:07:44
- Label: Sony Classical

Yo-Yo Ma and Kathryn Stott chronology
Paris – La Belle Epoque (2003)	Songs from the Arc of Life (2015)	Songs of Comfort and Hope (2020)

Songs from the Arc of Life is a collaborative album by cellist Yo-Yo Ma and pianist Kathryn Stott released in 2015. The album peaked at position 137 on the Billboard 200.

== Background ==
Yo-Yo Ma and Kathryn Stott had their first performance together in 1984 and have since been longtime friends and collaborators. Reflecting on their lengthy past together, Ma and Stott created the album to reflect change over a life with compositions they enjoy. The album's title is a likely nod to Songs in the Key of Life by Stevie Wonder. Ma and Stott released the album just before Ma's 60th birthday.

== Critical reception ==
Professional ratings
Review scores
Source	Rating
AllMusic	5/5 stars
The Observer	4/5 stars

The album was well-received. Fiona Maddocks wrote for The Observer that the album was "warm, engaged, vital music making by two of the finest musicians around." James Manheim for AllMusic called it a chart-topping "exceptional package". Classic FM named it their "Album of the Week" for the week starting on September 14, 2015.

== Track listing ==
No.	Title	Length
1.	"Ave Maria"	2:43
2.	"Lullaby, Op. 49, No. 4"	1:49
3.	"Songs My Mother Taught Me, Op. 55, No. 4 (from Gypsy Songs)"	1:56
4.	"Papillon, Op. 77"	2:48
5.	"Tango Jalousie"	3:42
6.	"I. Vanitas vanitatum"	3:03
7.	"Was It a Dream? Op. 37, No. 4"	2:16
8.	"Après un rêve, Op. 7, No. 1"	2:40
9.	"Salut d'amour, Op. 12"	2:44
10.	"Prelude No. 1"	1:51
11.	"Romance for Cello and Piano"	6:25
12.	"La Gitana"	3:32
13.	"Tema III"	7:34
14.	"The Swan"	2:54
15.	"The Wounded Heart"	2:29
16.	"Valse sentimentale, Op. 51, No. 6"	2:16
17.	"Louange à l'éternité de Jésus"	10:17
18.	"Beau Soir"	2:31
19.	"Ave Maria, Op. 52, No. 6"	4:14
Total length:		1:07:44

== Charts ==
Chart performance for Songs from the Arc of Life
Chart (2015)	Peak position
US Billboard 200	137
US Top Album Sales (Billboard)	68
US Top Classical Albums (Billboard)	1
US Traditional Classical Albums (Billboard)	1
