= Queen of the Tabarin Club =

1960 film

- Directed by: Jesús Franco
- Written by: Ernesto Arancibia; Jesús Franco; José Gallardo; Luis Lucas Ojeda; Maria A. Spaltro
- Produced by: Marius Lesoeur; Sergio Newman
- Starring: Mikaela; Yves Massard; Dora Doll
- Cinematography: Antonio Macasoli
- Edited by: Alfonso Santacana; Charles Nobel
- Music by: José Pagán; Ángel Pagán; Antonio Ramírez Ángel
- Production companies: Hispamer Films; CIFESA; Eurocine
- Distributed by: CIFESA; Eurocine
- Release date: 14 November 1960
- Running time: 100 minutes
- Countries: France; Spain
- Language: Spanish

Queen of the Tabarin Club (Spanish: La reina del Tabarín / Queen of the Tabarin) is a 1960 French-Spanish comedy film directed by Jesús Franco and starring Mikaela, Yves Massard and Dora Doll. It follows the adventures of a troupe of travelling musicians in the 1910s. It was released in France as Mariquita, La Belle de Tabarin.

Soledad Miranda had a very small uncredited role in this film, the first time she appeared in a Franco film. She would later go on to star in 6 of Franco's thrillers in 1970, before her death in a tragic automobile accident. This was the first time Franco worked for producer Marius Lesouer as well, who would go on to produce many of Franco's later films, including his 1961 opus The Awful Dr. Orloff.

== Partial cast ==
- Mikaela as Lolita
- Yves Massard as Fernando
- Dora Doll as Cabaret Singer
- Danielle Godet as Monique
- Antonio Garisa as Pepe
- Juan Antonio Riquelme as Miguel
- Julio Riscal as Alfonso
- Guadalupe Muñoz Sampedro as Madre de Fernando
- Alfredo Mayo as Charles
- Antonio Jiménez Escribano as Profesor de música

== Bibliography ==
- De España, Rafael (1994). Directory of Spanish and Portuguese Film-Makers and Films. Westport, CT: Greenwood Press. ISBN 978-0-313-29459-4.
