= Santiago Ontañón =

Spanish actor and art director

- Born: 1903; Santander, Spain
- Died: 26 August 1989 (aged 85–86); Madrid, Spain
- Occupations: Actor, art director
- Years active: 1931–1980 (film)

Santiago Ontañón (1903–1989) was a Spanish actor and art director, designing the sets for a number of film productions. His sister Sara Ontañón was a film editor. He was a friend of director Luis Buñuel.

== Selected filmography ==
=== Actor ===
- El embrujo de Sevilla (1931)
- La traviesa molinera (1934) – The Miller
- Por un perro chico, una mujer (1934)
- A Woman in Danger (1936) – Ricardo
- Faustina (1957) – Don Fernando
- Muchachas en vacaciones (1958)
- La vida por delante (1958) – Paciente 'Sra. de Anglada'
- Juego de niños (1959)
- Miss Cuplé (1969)
- La vida alrededor (1959) – Socio
- El día de los enamorados (1959) – Jugador de Golf
- Carnival Day (1960)
- Amor bajo cero (1960) – Contraalmirante
- Sólo para hombres (1960)
- Mi calle (1960)
- The Red Rose (1960)
- Adiós, Mimí Pompón (1961) – (uncredited)
- Ha llegado un ángel (1961) – Productor
- Julia y el celacanto (1961)
- El pobre García (1961)
- Siempre es domingo (1961)
- Honorables sinvergüenzas (1961)
- Tómbola (1962) – Consejero de seguros
- La gran familia (1962)
- The Executioner (1963) – Sr. Corcuera, el académico
- The Adventures of Scaramouche (1963)
- The Black Tulip (1964)
- Los dinamiteros (1964) – Conserje
- Búsqueme a esa chica (1964)
- Rueda de sospechosos (1964) – Don Pablo
- The Hell of Manitoba (1965) – Bankier
- La familia y... uno más (1965)
- Cotolay (1965) – Abad
- El arte de no casarse (1966)
- Tres perros locos, locos (1966)
- De cuerpo presente (1967)
- Crimen imperfecto (1970) – Invitado ebrio
- Variety (1971) – Decorador
- Blanca por fuera y Rosa por dentro (1971) – Don Félix
- Dans la poussière du soleil (1972) – Le banquier (uncredited)
- Las señoritas de mala compañía (1973) – Don Faustino (uncredited)
- Hold-Up, instantánea de una corrupción (1974)
- No quiero perder la honra (1975)
- La muerte ronda a Mónica (1976)
- Impossible Love (1977) – Hombre rico
- Secretos de alcoba (1977)
- Mi hija Hildegart (1977)
- Cinco tenedores (1980) – Los Monteros (final film role)

=== Art director ===
- The Moorish Queen (1937)
- The Black Tulip (1964)
- Run Like a Thief (1967)
- The Castle of Fu Manchu (1969)

== Bibliography ==
- Román Gubern & Paul Hammond. Luis Buñuel: The Red Years, 1929–1939. University of Wisconsin Pres, 2012.
