= Stuart Duncan =

American bluegrass musician

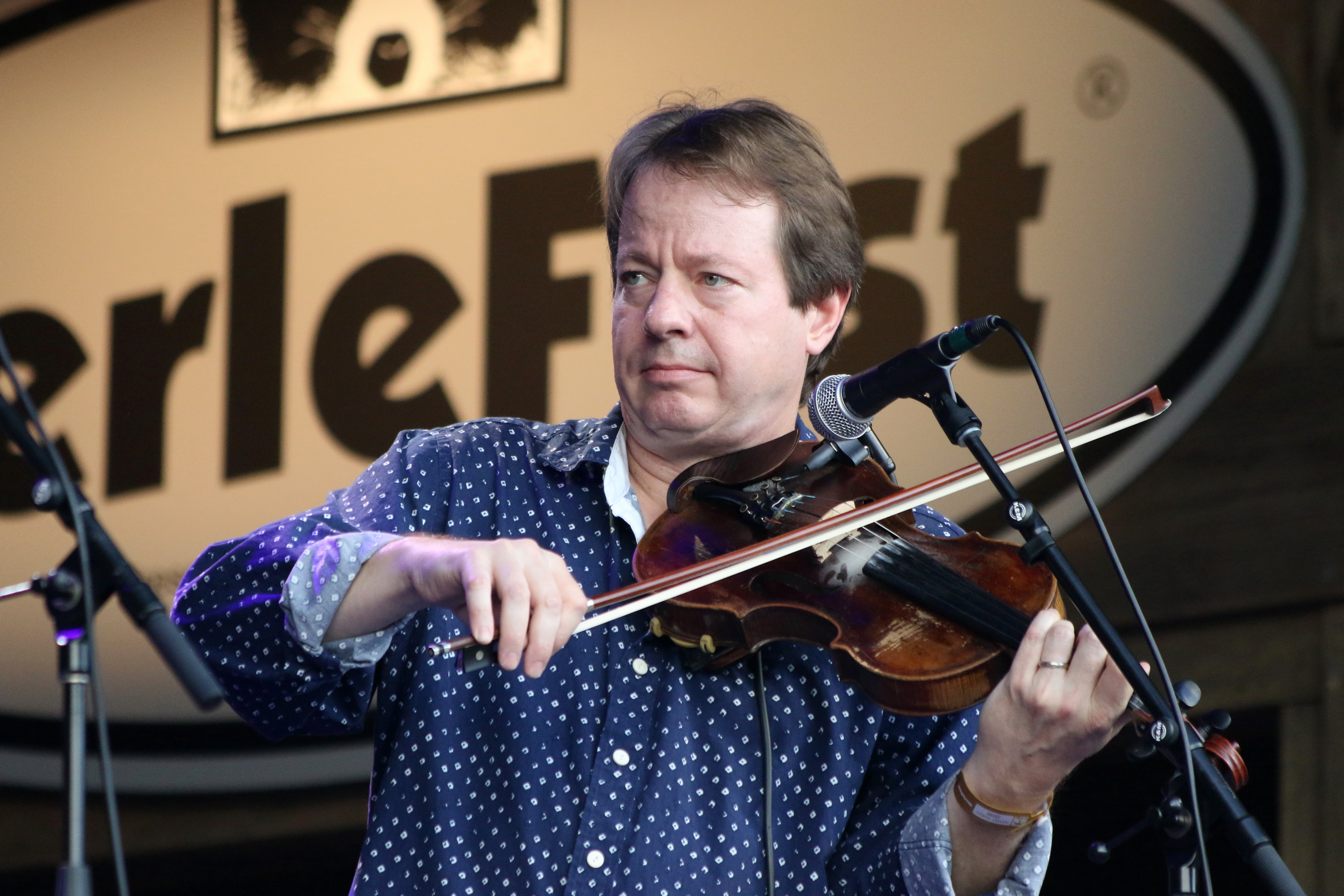
- Duncan in 2016

Background information
- Born: Stuart Ian Duncan; April 14, 1964 (age 62); Quantico, Virginia
- Origin: Quantico, Virginia, U.S.
- Genres: Bluegrass, country, Americana
- Instruments: Fiddle, mandolin, banjo, guitar
- Member of: Nashville Bluegrass Band
- Website: www.stuart-duncan.com

Stuart Ian Duncan (born April 14, 1964) is an American bluegrass musician who plays the fiddle, mandolin, guitar, and banjo.

== Life ==
Duncan was born in Quantico, Virginia, and raised in Santa Paula, California, where he played in the school band. He is married with three children.

Duncan has been a member of the Nashville Bluegrass Band since 1985. He also works as a session musician and has played with numerous well-known performers, including George Strait, Dolly Parton, Guy Clark, Reba McEntire, and Barbra Streisand. In 2006, he toured with the Mark Knopfler–Emmylou Harris Roadrunning tour, and he appears on their All the Roadrunning and Real Live Roadrunning albums. In 2008, he joined Robert Plant and Alison Krauss on the tour for their critically acclaimed album Raising Sand. He appeared on Transatlantic Sessions Series 4 broadcast by the BBC in September/October 2009.

In 2011, Duncan collaborated with cellist Yo-Yo Ma, bassist Edgar Meyer, mandolinist Chris Thile, and singer Aoife O'Donovan on the album The Goat Rodeo Sessions. The album debuted at number one on the Billboard Classical, Classical Crossover, and Bluegrass charts and reached number eighteen on the Billboard 200. It also won the Grammy Award for Best Folk Album and the Grammy Award for Best Engineered Album, Non-Classical in 2013.

In 2013, Duncan accompanied Diana Krall as a sideman on her Glad Rag Doll tour. In 2015 Duncan appeared on one of the tracks from the Jericho Summer album Night Train. Playing jazz on the violin, Duncan again toured with Diana Krall in 2018.

In 2020, Duncan once again collaborated with Ma, Meyer, Thile, and O'Donovan, releasing the album Not Our First Goat Rodeo. Like the group's previous album, reached number one on the Billboard Classical, Classical Crossover, and Bluegrass charts.

Duncan played fiddle on the mid-2021 Bob Dylan recordings of "Blowin' in the Wind," "Masters of War," "The Times They Are A-Changin' (song)," "Simple Twist of Fate," "Gotta Serve Somebody," and "Not Dark Yet" produced by T-Bone Burnett and recorded and mixed by Michael Piersante for a one-time sale as Ionic Originals.

In April 2025, Duncan joined Alison Krauss & Union Station on tour as a multi-instrumentalist.

== Awards ==
Duncan has received numerous awards. As a member of the Nashville Bluegrass Band, he won the Grammy Award for Best Bluegrass Album in 1994 and 1996. Duncan was named the Academy of Country Music Fiddle Player of the Year for 1996, 1998, 1999, 2001, and 2004, and Specialty Instrument Player of the Year for 2006.

== Discography ==
Solo

- Stuart Duncan (Rounder, 1992)

With Alison Brown

- Pre-sequel (Ridge Runner, 1981)

With Béla Fleck and Mark Schatz

- Spring In The Old Country (Flying Fish, 1991)

With John Mock and Mark Howard

- Irish Hymns (Cumberland Records, 2001)

With Dave Jacques, Keith Sewell, Ned Luberecki, and Mike Compton

- Pickin' On Jeff Bates - A Bluegrass Tribute (CMH Records, 2005)

With Yo-Yo Ma, Edgar Meyer, and Chris Thile

- The Goat Rodeo Sessions (Sony Classical, 2011)
- Not Our First Goat Rodeo (Sony Classical, 2020)

With Rudi Epstein’s All Original Bluegrass Showcase, Jeff Autry, and Mark Schatz

- Carolina Chimes (Foxfire Recording, 2018)

With Charlie Haden Family and Friends

- Rambling Boy (Decca, 2008)

With The Nashville Bluegrass Band

- My Native Home (Rounder, 1985)
- Idle Time (Rounder, 1986)
- To Be His Child (Rounder, 1987)
- New Moon Rising (w/ Peter Rowan) (Sugar Hill, 1988)
- The Boys Are Back In Town (Sugar Hill, 1990)
- Home Of The Blues (Sugar Hill, 1991)
- Waitin' For the Hard Times to Go (Sugar Hill, 1993)
- Unleashed (Sugar Hill Records, 1995)
- American Beauty (Sugar Hill Records, 1998)
- Twenty Year Blues (Sugar Hill Records, 2004)

With The Sugarcanes

- Mystery Train: Elvis Costello – Female & The Sound Improves (Midnight Dreamer, 2010)

With Peter Rowan’s Reggaebilly

- Reggaebilly! (Burnt Puppy Music, 1999)

With Phil Leadbetter's All Stars Of Bluegrass

- Swing For The Fences (Pinecastle, 2020)
