= Sara Ontañón =

Spanish film editor

- Born: Sara Ontañón Fernandez; 1907; Santander, Spain
- Died: 1968; Madrid, Spain
- Occupation: Film editor
- Relatives: Santiago Ontañón (brother)

Sara Ontañón (1907-1968) was a Spanish film editor active from the late 1930s through the 1960s.

== Selected filmography ==
- La primera aventura (1965)
- Los elegidos (1964)
- Man of the Cursed Valley (1964)
- El balcón de la Luna (1962)
- The Reprieve (1961)
- Días de feria (1960)
- Alfonso XII y María Cristina (1960)
- Con la vida hicieron fuego (1959)
- Dos caminos (1954)
- El cerco del diablo (1952)
- Cielo negro (1951)
- La guitarra de Gardel (1949)
- Bambú (1945)
- Lola Montes (1944)
- Eloísa está debajo de un almendro (1943)
- Castillo de naipes (1943)
