= Songs of Joy & Peace =

Studio album by Yo-Yo Ma & Friends
- Released: October 14, 2008
- Recorded: October 29, 2007, March–June 2008
- Genre: Christmas music
- Label: Sony Classical

Yo-Yo Ma chronology
Appassionato (2007)	Songs of Joy & Peace (2008)

Songs of Joy and Peace is a Christmas music album by cellist Yo-Yo Ma, released on October 14, 2008. The album won the 2010 Grammy Award for Best Classical Crossover Album. It features collaborations with many other artists, including vocalists Diana Krall & Alison Krauss, bassist John Clayton, pianist Dave Brubeck, cellist Matt Brubeck, clarinetist Paquito D'Rivera, trumpeter Chris Botti, pianist Billy Childs, bassist Robert Hurst, drummers Billy Kilson and John Hadfield, guitarist Romero Lubambo, bassist Edgar Meyer, bassist Nilson Matta, mandolinist Chris Thile, vocalist Renée Fleming, Celtic fiddler Natalie MacMaster, harpist Marta Cook, saxophonist Joshua Redman, piper Cristina Pato, vocalist James Taylor, the Assad Family, ukulele virtuoso Jake Shimabukuro, and Wu Tong & the Silk Road Ensemble.

== Track listing ==
All tracks traditional except where noted.

1. Dona Nobis Pacem (Give Us Peace) – 2:00
2. You Couldn't Be Cuter (Dorothy Fields/Jerome Kern) (with Diana Krall) – 3:28
3. Joy to the World 3:42
4. Here Comes the Sun (George Harrison) – 2:50
5. Improvisation on Dona Nobis Pacem (Edgar Meyer/Chris Thile) – 2:57
6. The Wassail Song / All Through the Night – 2:37
7. A Christmas Jig/Mouth of the Tobique Reel – 3:46
8. The Wexford Carol – 4:20
9. Panxoliña: A Galician Carol – 3:05
10. Improvisation on Dona Nobis Pacem (Sérgio Assad/Odair Assad) – 0:58
11. Vassourinhas (Matias da Rocha) – 3:25
12. Improvisation on Dona Nobis Pacem (Paquito D'Rivera/Alon Yavnai) – 2:32
13. Invitación al Danzón (Paquito D'Rivera) – 4:53
14. My One and Only Love (Robert Mellin/Guy Wood) – 4:07
15. Familia (Sérgio Assad/Odair Assad) – 3:57
16. Concordia (Dave Brubeck) – 4:30
17. My Favorite Things (Rodgers and Hammerstein) – 6:29
18. Touch the Hand of Love (Blossom Dearie) – 4:35
19. Kuai Le (Osvaldo Golijov) – 3:26
20. This Little Light of Mine (with Amelia Zirin-Brown) – 5:02
21. Happy Xmas (War is Over) (John Lennon/Yoko Ono) – 4:45
22. Dona Nobis Pacem/Auld Lang Syne – 1:57

== Charts ==
=== Weekly charts ===
Chart (2008)	Peak position
US Billboard 200	20
US Top Classical Albums (Billboard)	1
US Top Holiday Albums (Billboard)	2

=== Year-end charts ===
Chart (2008)	Position
US Top Classical Albums (Billboard)	4

Chart (2009)	Position
US Billboard 200	129
US Top Classical Albums (Billboard)	4
