= Calle Mayor (film) =

- Spanish theatrical release poster
- Directed by: Juan Antonio Bardem
- Written by: Juan Antonio Bardem
- Produced by: Cesáreo González
- Starring: Betsy Blair; José Suárez
- Cinematography: Michel Kelber
- Edited by: Margarita de Ochoa
- Music by: Isidro B. Maiztegui; Joseph Kosma
- Distributed by: Suevia Films
- Release date: 5 December 1956
- Running time: 99 minutes
- Country: Spain
- Language: Spanish

Main Street (Spanish: Calle Mayor) is a 1956 Spanish drama film directed by Juan Antonio Bardem starring Betsy Blair and José Suárez. It is based on a Carlos Arniches play titled La señorita de Trevélez. The shooting locations were Palencia, Cuenca and Logroño. The film won the FIPRESCI Award at the Venice Film Festival. It was also selected as the Spanish entry for the Best Foreign Language Film at the 30th Academy Awards, but was not accepted as a nominee.

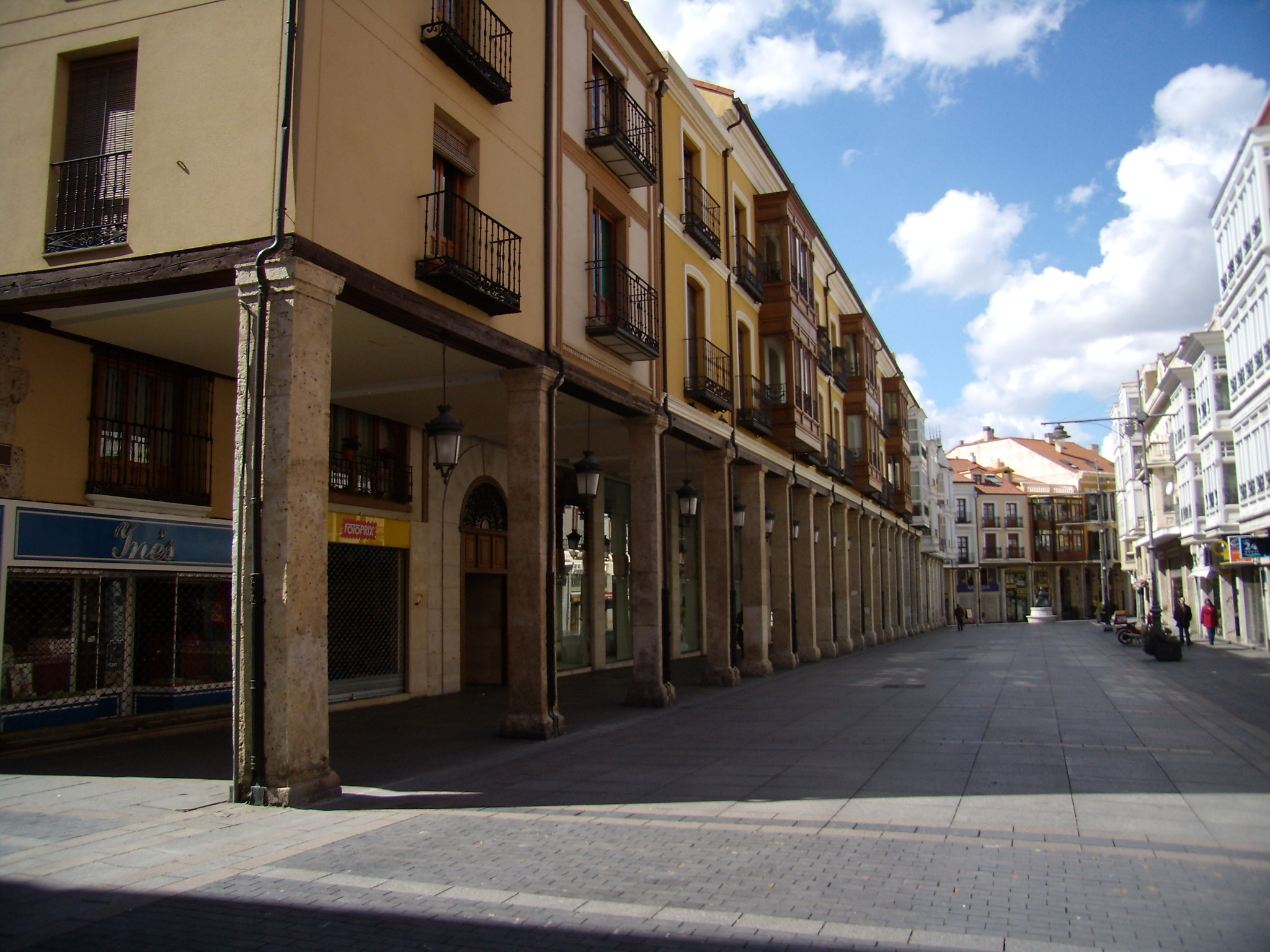
Main Street in Palencia, location of several key sequences of Calle Mayor

== Plot ==
Isabel is a good-natured and sensible, unmarried woman who lives in a small town with her widowed mother. At the age of 35, she is losing all hope of getting married and having children.

A group of bored middle-aged friends decides to play a trick on Isabel: Juan, the youngest and most handsome of them all, will pretend to fall in love with her. As Isabel lives the courtship, full of hope and joy, Juan realizes the cruelty of the situation a bit too late, but, pushed by his buddies, doesn't dare tell Isabel the truth.

When the day of the gala dance at the town's club arrives, Isabel is still living her dream of love. She expects her engagement to be publicly announced from the stage, but Juan, who is desperate, tries doing anything he can, to shy away from the muddle.

== Cast ==
- Betsy Blair (dubbed into Spanish by Elsa Fábregas) as Isabel
- José Suárez as Juan
- Yves Massard as Federico
- Luis Peña as Luis
- Dora Doll as Toña
- Alfonso Godá as José María, 'Pepe el Calvo'
- Manuel Alexandre as Luciano
- José Calvo as Doctor
- Matilde Muñoz Sampedro as Chacha
- René Blancard as Editor

== Background ==
Similarities between Calle Mayor story and environment and Federico Fellini's I Vitelloni have been pointed out. Calle Mayor was Blair's first performance outside the US.

The name of the role played by Yves Massard was Bardem's homage to "Federico Sánchez", a pseudonym under which Jorge Semprún managed the clandestine activities of the Communist Party of Spain (PCE). Bardem was a well-known member of the PCE.

The film was selected as the Spanish entry for the Best Foreign Language Film at the 30th Academy Awards, but was not accepted as a nominee.

== Sequel ==
Seven years after Calle Mayor, Bardem wrote and directed Nunca pasa nada (Nothing Ever Happens), which depicts an environment and characters similar to those in Calle Mayor, to the point that some critics nicknamed it disdainfully Calle Menor (Minor street).

== See also ==
- The Lady from Trevélez (1936)
- List of submissions to the 30th Academy Awards for Best Foreign Language Film
- List of Spanish submissions for the Academy Award for Best Foreign Language Film
