= Mikaela (singer) =

Spanish singer and actress (1935–1991)

- Born: Micaela Rodríguez Cuesta; 19 June 1935; Seville, Andalusia, Spain
- Died: 29 March 1991 (aged 55) Madrid, Community of Madrid, Spain
- Genres: Copla; rumba flamenca; pasodoble
- Occupations: Singer, actress
- Instrument: Vocals
- Years active: 1956–1988
- Labels: Columbia; Montilla; Zafiro; Belter
- Website: mikaelartista.com

Micaela Rodríguez Cuesta (19 June 1935 – 29 March 1991), known professionally as Mikaela, was a Spanish singer and actress. She began her film career in 1956 and played her first starring role in the Spanish film The Red Rose (1960). Her signature song, "La luna y el toro" (1964), was a number-one hit in Spain and earned her an award in 1965. She died on 29 March 1991 from leukemia.

== Selected filmography ==
- The Life of Agustín Lara (1959)
- The Red Rose (1960)
- Queen of the Tabarin Club (1960)
- Gunfight at Red Sands (1963)
- Agent 077: From the Orient with Fury (1965)
- Madamigella di Maupin (1966)
- High Season for Spies (1966)
