= Yo-Yo Ma =

American cellist (born 1955)

Yo-Yo Ma 馬友友
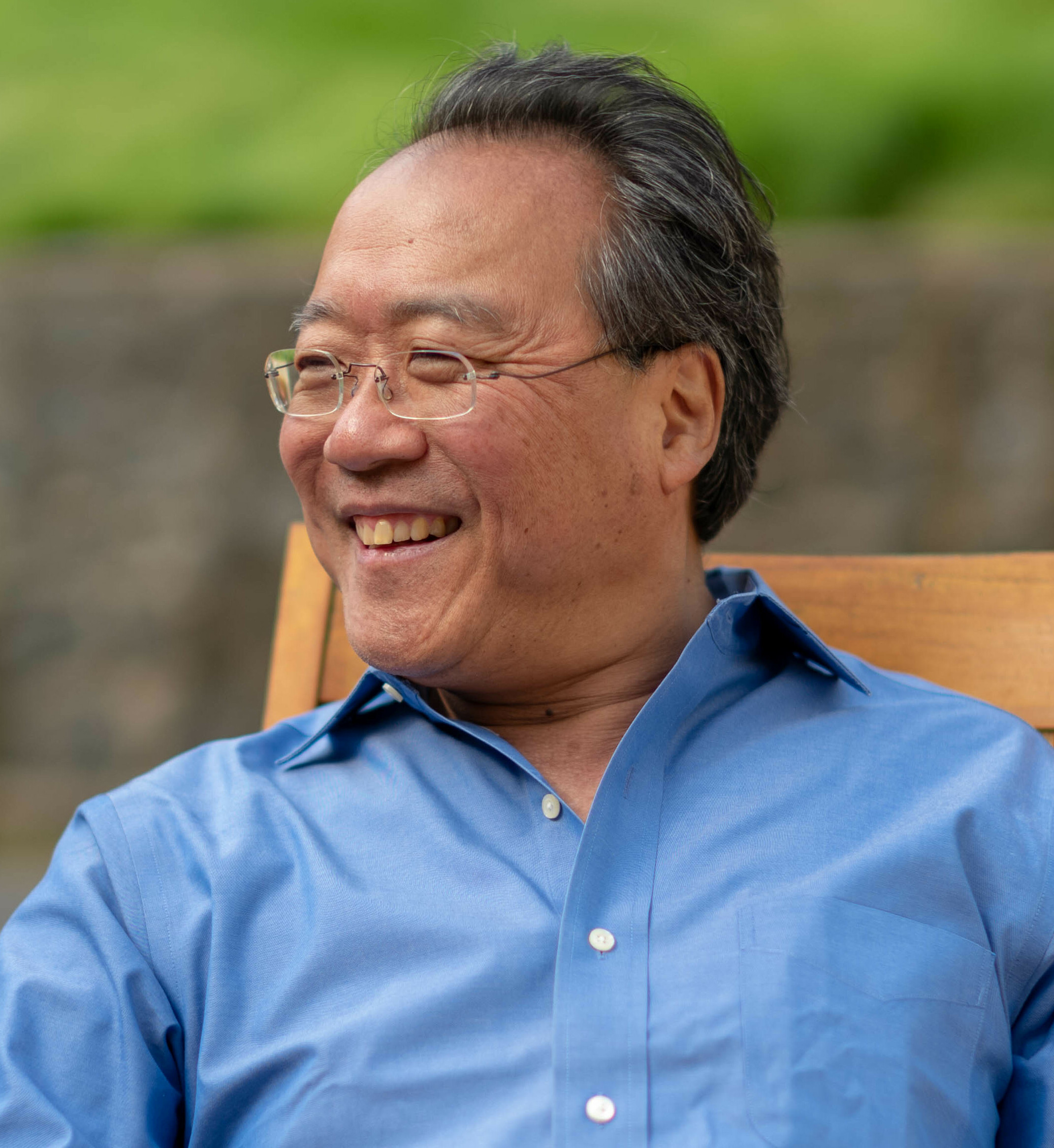
- Yo-Yo Ma in 2018

Background information
- Born: October 7, 1955 (age 71); Paris, France
- Instrument: Cello
- Years active: 1961–present
- Labels: Sony Classical; Sony Masterworks
- Member of: Silk Road Ensemble
- Spouse: Jill Hornor (m. 1978)
- Website: yo-yoma.com

Chinese name
- Traditional Chinese: 馬友友
- Simplified Chinese: 马友友
Transcriptions
Standard Mandarin
- Hanyu Pinyin: Mǎ Yǒuyǒu
- Bopomofo: ㄇㄚˇㄧㄡˇㄧㄡˇ
- Wade–Giles: Ma Yu-yu
- Yale Romanization: Mǎ Yǒuyǒu
- IPA: [mà jǒʊjòʊ]
Yue: Cantonese
- Yale Romanization: Máah Yáuh-yáuh
- Jyutping: Maa^{5} Jau^{5}-jau^{5}
- IPA: [ma̬ ja̬ːu ja̬ːu]

Yo-Yo Ma (Note: Traditional Chinese: 馬友友; simplified Chinese: 马友友; pinyin: Mǎ Yǒuyǒu) (born October 7, 1955) is an American cellist. Born to Chinese parents in Paris, he was regarded as a child prodigy, and began to study the cello with his father at age four. Ma moved with his family to Boston at age seven and later to New York City, where he continued his cello studies at the Juilliard School before pursuing a liberal arts education at Harvard University. He has performed as a soloist with orchestras around the world, recorded more than 92 albums, and received 20 Grammy Awards.

In addition to recordings of the standard classical repertoire, Ma has recorded a wide variety of folk music, such as American bluegrass music, traditional Chinese melodies, the tangos of Argentine composer Astor Piazzolla, and Brazilian music. He has also collaborated with artists from a diverse range of genres, including Bobby McFerrin, Carlos Santana, Chris Botti, Diana Krall, James Taylor, Miley Cyrus, Zakir Hussain, and Sting.

Ma has been a United Nations Messenger of Peace since 2006. He has received numerous awards, including the Avery Fisher Prize in 1978, The Glenn Gould Prize in 1999, the National Medal of Arts in 2001, the Presidential Medal of Freedom in 2011, Kennedy Center Honors in 2011, the Polar Music Prize in 2012, and the Birgit Nilsson Prize in 2022. He was named one of Time's 100 most influential people of 2020. Ma's primary performance cello is the Davidov Stradivarius, made in 1712 by Antonio Stradivari.

== Early life and education ==
Ma's mother, Marina Lu, was a singer, and his father, Hiao-Tsiun Ma, was a Ningpo city violinist, composer, and professor of music at National Central University (now in Taoyuan, Taiwan). They both migrated from China to France. Ma's sister, Yeou-Cheng, played the violin and piano professionally before obtaining a medical degree from Harvard Medical School and becoming a pediatrician. The family moved to Boston when Ma was seven.

From the age of three, Ma played the drums, violin, piano, and later viola, but settled on the cello in 1960 at age four. When three-year-old Ma said he wanted a big instrument, his father went to see Étienne Vatelot, a foremost violin maker in Paris who, after a chat, lent him a 1/16th cello. He jokes that his first choice was the double bass due to its large size, but he compromised and took up the cello instead. While Hiao-Tsiun handled much of his son's early music education, he eventually conceded that Ma required a more skilled teacher, and signed his son up for cello lessons with Michelle Lepinte. He began performing before audiences at age five and played for presidents Dwight D. Eisenhower and John F. Kennedy when he was seven. At age eight, he appeared on American television with his sister in an event introduced by Leonard Bernstein. In 1964, Isaac Stern introduced them on The Tonight Show Starring Johnny Carson, and they performed a sonata by Giovanni Battista Sammartini. After moving to New York, Ma enrolled at the Juilliard School, where he studied with Leonard Rose and attended Trinity School and the Professional Children's School, from which he graduated at age 15. He appeared as a soloist with the Harvard Radcliffe Orchestra in a performance of Tchaikovsky's Variations on a Rococo Theme.

Ma attended Columbia University, but dropped out. He later enrolled at Harvard College. Before entering Harvard, Ma played in the Marlboro Festival Orchestra under the direction of cellist and conductor Pablo Casals, Ma's childhood hero. He spent four summers at the Marlboro Music Festival after meeting and falling in love with Mount Holyoke College sophomore and festival administrator Jill Hornor during his first summer there in 1972.

Even before that, Ma gained fame and performed with many of the world's major orchestras. He has also played chamber music, often with pianist Emanuel Ax, with whom he has a close friendship from their days at Juilliard. Ma received his bachelor's degree in anthropology from Harvard in 1976, and in 1991 received an honorary doctorate from Harvard.

== Career ==
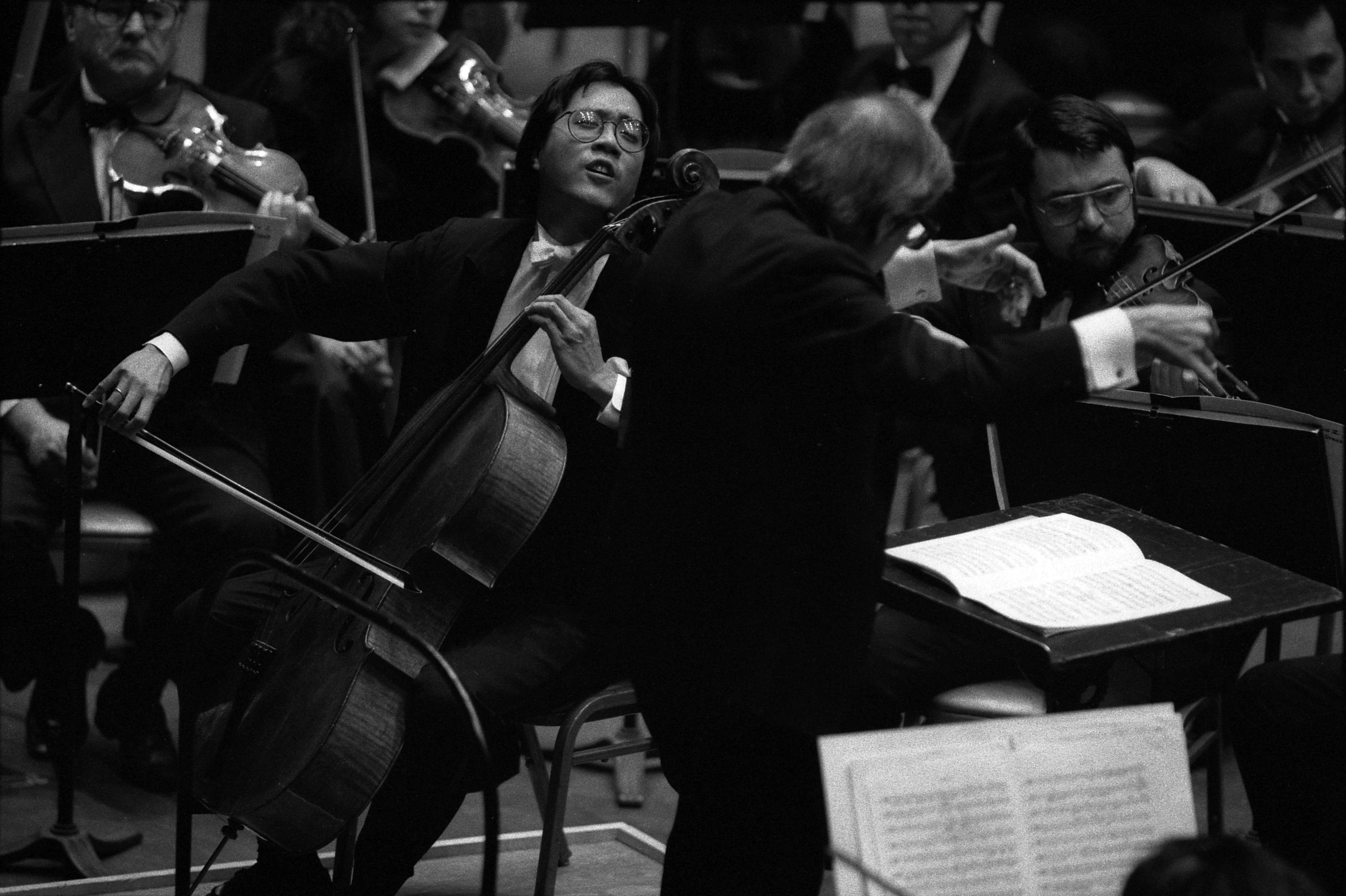
Ma performing with the Los Angeles Philharmonic and André Previn in 1988

Ma was featured on John Williams's soundtrack to the Hollywood film Seven Years in Tibet (1997). He was heard on the soundtrack of Crouching Tiger, Hidden Dragon (2000) and Master and Commander: The Far Side of the World (2003). He collaborated with Williams again on the score for Memoirs of a Geisha (2005). He has also worked with Italian composer Ennio Morricone and has recorded Morricone's compositions of the Dollars Trilogy, including The Good, the Bad, and the Ugly, as well as Once Upon a Time in America, The Mission, and The Untouchables. He has recorded over 90 albums, 19 of which won Grammy Awards. He received the Award of Excellence from New York's International Center.

In addition to his prolific musical career, Ma collaborated in 1999 with landscape architects to design a Bach-inspired garden. Known as the Music Garden, it interprets Bach's Suite No. 1 in G major, with the garden's sections designed to correspond to the suite's dance movements. Toronto enthusiastically embraced the design, originally planned for Boston, and it was built in the Harbourfront neighborhood.

Ma was named Peace Ambassador by then-UN Secretary-General Kofi Annan in January 2006. He is a founding member of the influential Chinese-American Committee of 100, which addresses the concerns of Americans of Chinese heritage.

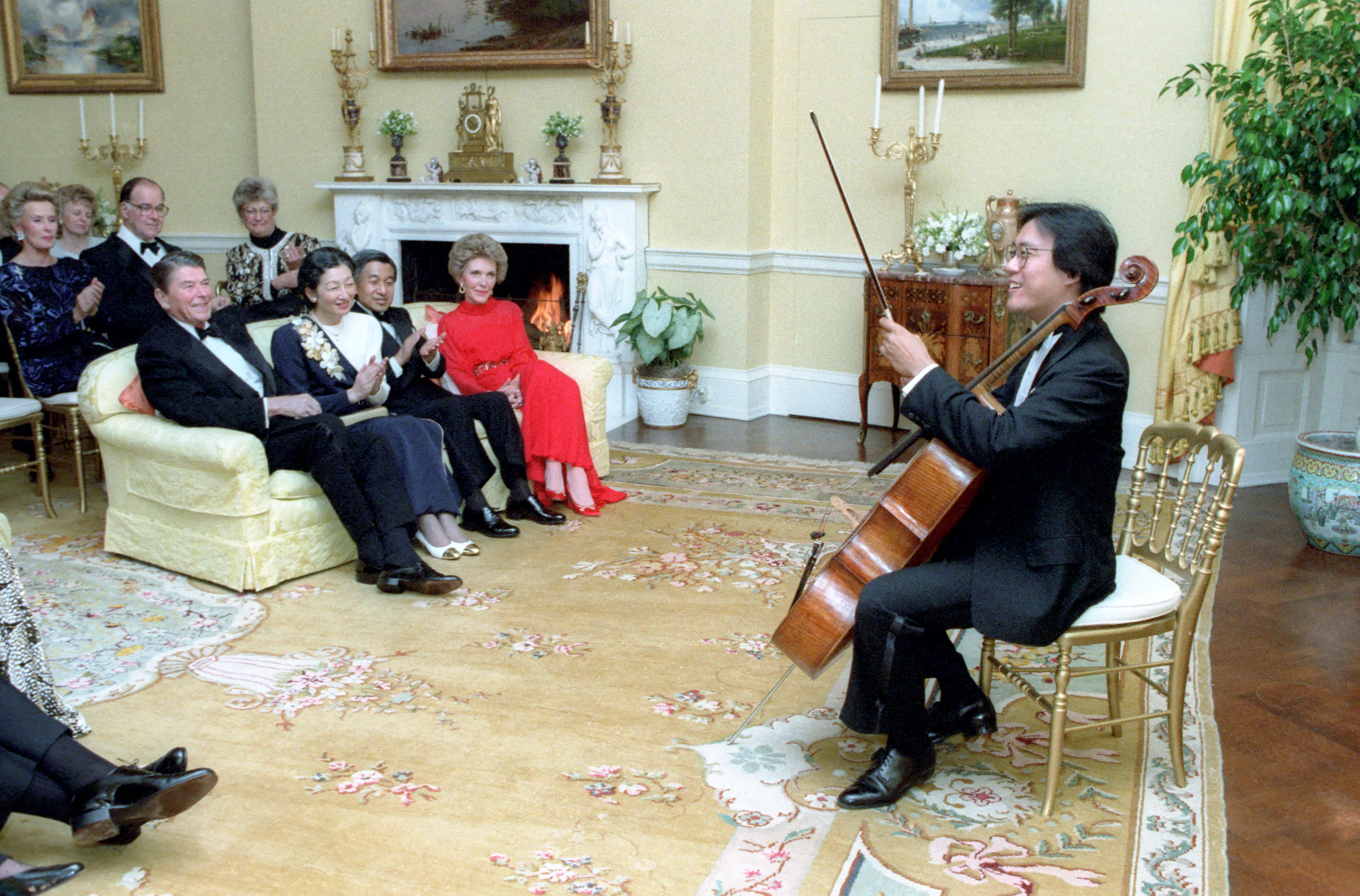
Ma performs at the White House for American president Ronald Reagan, Crown Princess Michiko and Crown Prince Akihito of Japan, and Nancy Reagan, October 1987

On November 3, 2009, President Barack Obama appointed Ma to serve on the President's Committee on the Arts and Humanities. His music was featured in the 2010 documentary Jews and Baseball: An American Love Story, narrated by Academy Award winner Dustin Hoffman. In 2010, Obama announced that he would recognize Ma with the Presidential Medal of Freedom, which Ma received in February 2011.

In 2010, Ma was named Judson and Joyce Green Creative Consultant of the Chicago Symphony Orchestra. He launched the Citizen Musician initiative partnership in partnership with the orchestra's music director, Riccardo Muti. Also in 2010, he appeared on a solo album by guitarist Carlos Santana, Guitar Heaven: The Greatest Guitar Classics of All Time, playing alongside Santana and singer India Arie on the Beatles classic "While My Guitar Gently Weeps".

In 2015, Ma performed with singer-songwriter and guitarist James Taylor on three tracks of Taylor's chart-topping album Before This World. In 2019, Ma directed the orchestra at the annual Youth Music Culture Guangdong. Ma is represented by the independent artist management firm Opus 3 Artists. Ma contributed to the charity tribute album The Metallica Blacklist, released in 2021, backing Miley Cyrus on a cover of the Metallica song "Nothing Else Matters".

Ma serves on the Board of Trustees of the World Economic Forum.

=== Silk Road Ensemble ===
Ma formed his own collective, the Silk Road Ensemble, named after the route across Asia which for more than 2,000 years was used for trade between Europe and China. His goal was to bring together musicians from diverse countries that were historically linked by the Silk Road. The ensemble's recordings are issued on the Sony Classical label. He also founded Silk Road Connect, an educational pilot program for children from middle schools in the United States, including New York City.

=== Our Common Nature ===
In 2022, Ma created Our Common Nature, a series of collaborative events bringing together diverse groups of local stakeholders for music and cultural exchange in wilderness locations in the U.S. (mostly in national parks or national historic parks). These events were documented in a seven-episode companion podcast of the same name, which was released in 2025, hosted by Ana González, and produced by Alan Goffinski.

== Playing style ==
Critics have called Ma "omnivorous"; he has an eclectic repertoire. In addition to numerous recordings of the standard classical repertoire, he has recorded Baroque pieces on period instruments; American bluegrass music; traditional Chinese melodies, including the soundtrack to the film Crouching Tiger, Hidden Dragon; the tangos of Argentinian composer Astor Piazzolla; Brazilian music, including traditional and contemporary songs by Antônio Carlos Jobim and Pixinguinha; a collaboration with Bobby McFerrin; and the music of Philip Glass, in such works as the 2002 Naqoyqatsi.

Ma is known for his smooth, rich tone, soulful lyricism, and virtuosity. He released a cello recording of Niccolò Paganini's Caprice No. 24 for solo violin and Zoltán Kodály's Solo Sonata.

== Instruments ==
Ma's primary performance instrument is the Davidov cello, made in 1712 by Antonio Stradivari. It was previously owned by Jacqueline du Pré, who bequeathed it to him. Du Pré voiced her frustration with the cello's "unpredictability", but Ma attributed du Pré's sentiment to her impassioned playing style, adding that the Stradivarius cello must be "coaxed" by the player. Before the Davidov, he performed on a 1722 Matteo Gofriller cello for much of his early career. The instrument previously belonged to the French cellist Pierre Fournier.

Ma also plays on a 1733 Domenico Montagnana cello, named the "Petunia". In 2005, it was valued at $2.5 million ($4.1 million in 2025 prices). A student approached Ma after one of his classes in Salt Lake City and asked if the cello had a nickname. Ma replied, "No, but if I play for you, will you name it?" The student chose Petunia, and it stuck. In 1999, Ma inadvertently left the cello in a taxicab in New York City, but it was quickly returned undamaged. Also in 1999, when the cello's neck was damaged during X-ray baggage inspection, Ma borrowed the Pawle Stradivarius cello from the Chimei Museum for a concert in Taiwan. The damage was repaired in time, but Ma played both Petunia and Pawle in the concert nonetheless.

Ma also owns a modern cello made by Peter and Wendela Moes of Warrenton, Virginia; one of carbon fiber by the Luis and Clark company of Boston; and a Samuel Zygmuntowicz cello. Zygmuntowicz said he wanted to give Ma "a reason to leave his Montagnana at home."

== Performances ==
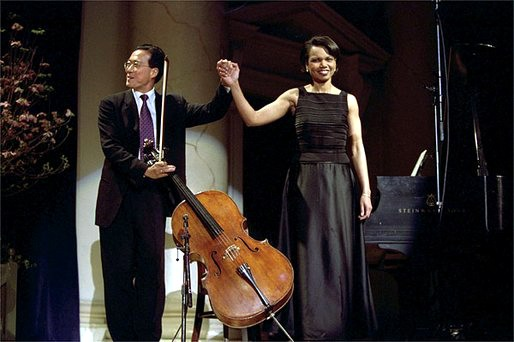
Ma with Condoleezza Rice after performing a duet at the presentation of the 2001 National Medal of Arts and National Humanities Medal Awards

On July 5, 1986, Ma performed in the New York Philharmonic's tribute to the 100th anniversary of the Statue of Liberty, which aired live on ABC Television. The orchestra, with conductor Zubin Mehta, performed in Central Park.

Ma performed a duet with Condoleezza Rice at the presentation of the 2001 National Medal of Arts and National Humanities Medal Awards. He was the first performer on September 11, 2002, at the site of the World Trade Center, while the first of the names of the dead were read on the first anniversary of the attack on the WTC; he played the Sarabande from Bach's Cello Suite No. 5 in C minor. He performed a special arrangement of Sting's "Fragile" with Sting and the Mormon Tabernacle Choir in the opening ceremonies of the 2002 Winter Olympics in Salt Lake City, Utah. He also appeared as a Pennington Great Performers series artist with the Baton Rouge Symphony Orchestra in 2005.

At the first inauguration of Barack Obama on January 20, 2009, Ma performed John Williams's Air and Simple Gifts with Itzhak Perlman (violin), Gabriela Montero (piano), and Anthony McGill (clarinet). The quartet played live, but a recording made two days earlier played simultaneously over speakers and on television out of concern that the cold weather could damage the instruments. Ma said, "A broken string was not an option. It was wicked cold."

On May 3, 2009, Ma performed the world premiere of Bruce Adolphe's "Self Comes to Mind" for cello and two percussionists with John Ferrari and Ayano Kataoka at the American Museum of Natural History. The work is based on a poetic description neuroscientist Antonio Damasio wrote for Adolphe on the evolution of brain into mind. A film of brain scans provided by Hanna Damasio and other images were coordinated with the performance.

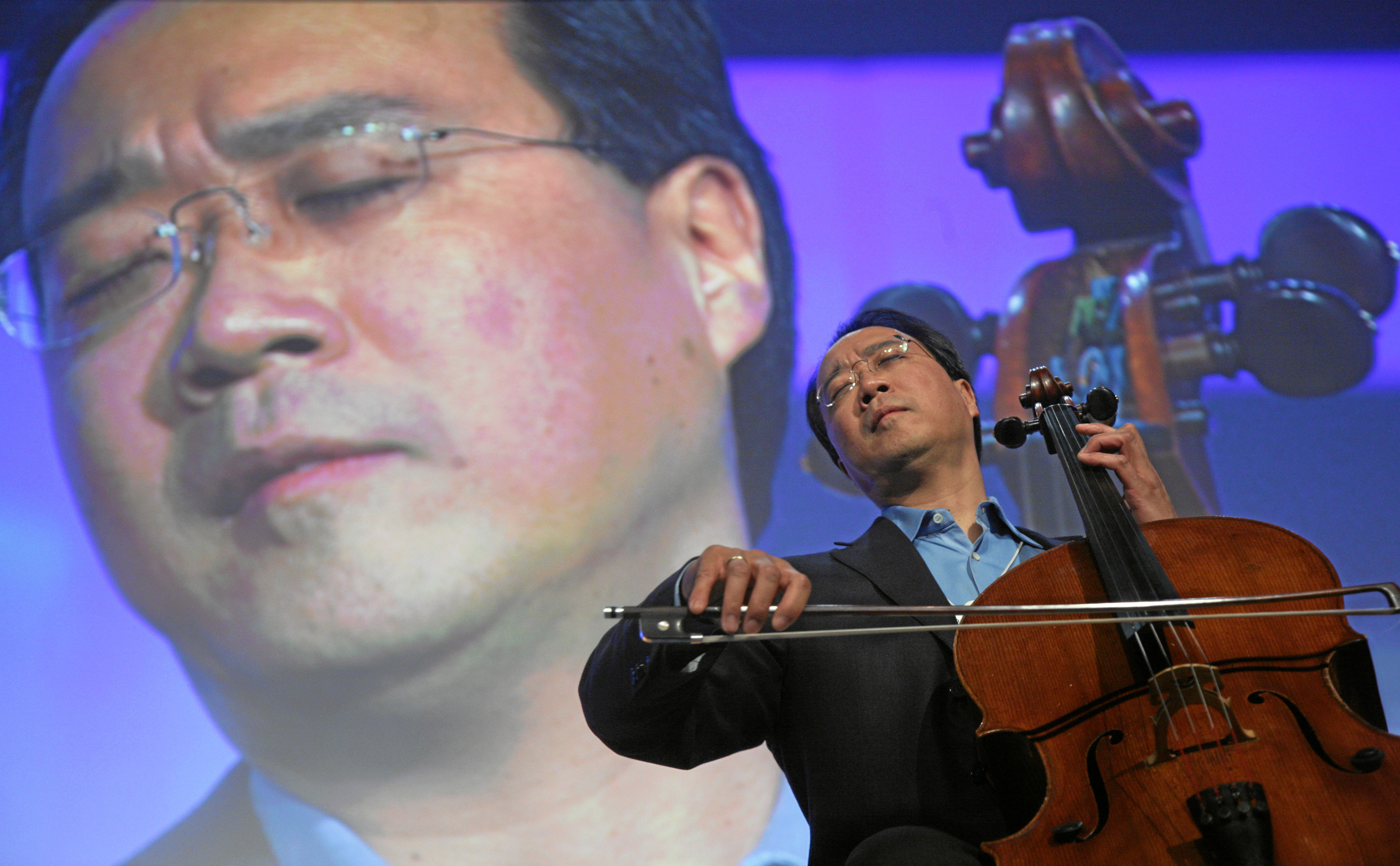
Ma appearing at the World Economic Forum's annual meeting in 2008

On August 29, 2009, Ma performed at the funeral mass for Senator Ted Kennedy. Pieces he performed included the sarabande from Bach's Cello Suite No. 6 in D major and Franck's "Panis angelicus" with Plácido Domingo.

On October 3, 2009, Ma appeared with Canadian prime minister Stephen Harper at the National Arts Centre gala in Ottawa. A fan of The Beatles, Harper played the piano and sang a rendition of "With a Little Help from My Friends" as Ma accompanied him on cello. On October 16, 2011, Ma performed at the memorial for Steve Jobs at Stanford Memorial Church.

In 2011, Ma performed with American dancer Charles "Lil Buck" Riley in the United States and in China at the U.S.-China Forum on the Arts and Culture.

On April 18, 2013, he performed at an interfaith service to honor the victims of the Boston Marathon bombing at the Cathedral of the Holy Cross, playing the sarabande from Bach's Cello Suite No. 5. He and other musicians also accompanied members of the Boston Children's Chorus in a hymn.

On September 9, 2015, Ma performed all six of Bach's cello suites at the Royal Albert Hall as part of the BBC Proms season.

On September 12, 2017, Ma performed all six of Bach's cello suites at the Hollywood Bowl. After the first three suites, there was a ten-minute pause. The audience of around 17,000 also heard him play an encore, a tribute to "cellist Pablo Casals, who as a 13-year-old in 1890 discovered an old copy of the Bach suites in a secondhand music store, bringing them to modern attention. Ma's memorable last words were, 'If there are any 13-year-olds here—don't throw anything away.'"

On November 11, 2018, Ma performed at the Arc de Triomphe with violinist Renaud Capuçon in front of a crowd of world leaders during a ceremony marking the Centenary of the Armistice of 11 November 1918.

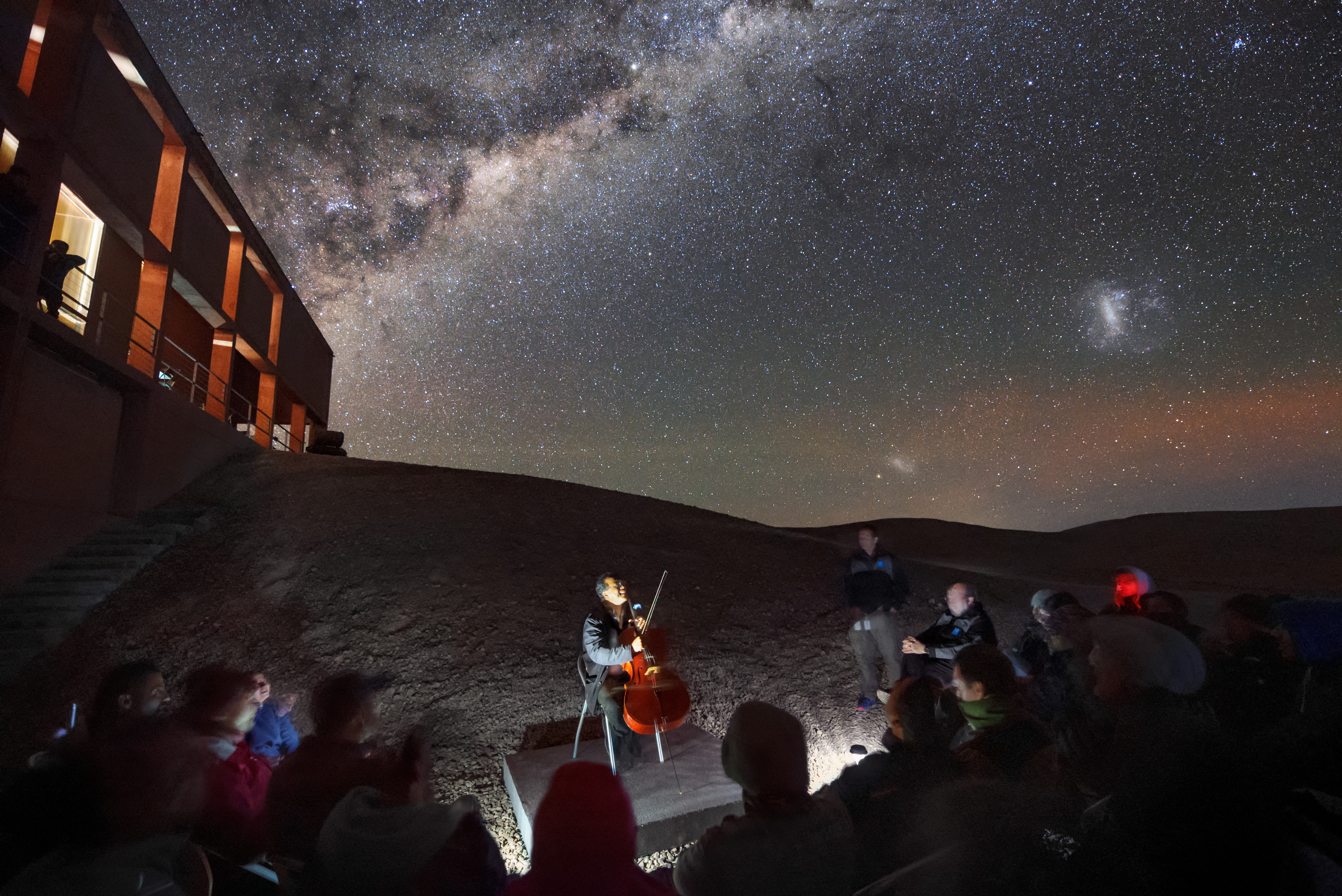
Ma's performance at Paranal Observatory, home of the Very Large Telescope

On May 1, 2019, he performed at Paranal Observatory in the Atacama Desert. He said his interest in astronomy motivated him to visit and perform there.

On June 20, 2019, Ma performed Bach's cello suites at Jay Pritzker Pavilion in Chicago. The free performance attracted what might have been his largest audience, with a pavilion capacity of 11,000 and many thousands more listening from surrounding Millennium Park.

On January 20, 2021, Ma's performance of "Amazing Grace"—pre-recorded due to the COVID-19 pandemic—was played during the inauguration of Joe Biden. In March 2021, Ma played "Ave Maria" in an impromptu waiting room concert after receiving his second dose of a COVID-19 vaccine at Berkshire Community College in Massachusetts.

On September 14, 2021, Ma again performed Bach's six cello suites at the Hollywood Bowl, this time without intermission, pausing only briefly for applause between suites, and to announce his dedications for two of them.

On December 7, 2024, at the reopening of Notre-Dame de Paris, Ma performed the prelude from Bach's first cello suite.

== Media appearances ==
Ma appeared as himself in an episode ("My Music Rules") of the animated children's television series Arthur, and on The West Wing (the episode "Noël"), where he played the prelude to Bach's first cello suite at a congressional Christmas party. He made five appearances on Sesame Street, all of which first aired during the show's 17th season in 1986. He appeared in The Simpsons episode "Puffless", where he played a serenade and theme music. Ma's likeness appeared in another Simpsons episode, "Missionary: Impossible", but he was played by regular Simpsons cast member Hank Azaria. Ma appeared twice on Mister Rogers' Neighborhood, developed a friendship with creator and host Fred Rogers, and later received the inaugural Fred Rogers Legacy Award.

Ma was often invited to press events by Apple Inc. and Pixar CEO Steve Jobs, performed during the company's major events, and appeared in a commercial for the Macintosh computer. Ma's Bach recordings were used in a memorial video Apple released on the first anniversary of Jobs's death. Ma was a guest on the "Not My Job" segment of Wait Wait... Don't Tell Me! on April 7, 2007, where he won for listener Thad Moore.

On October 27, 2008, Ma appeared as a guest and performer on The Colbert Report. He was also one of the show's guests on November 1, 2011, when he performed songs from the album The Goat Rodeo Sessions with musicians Stuart Duncan, Edgar Meyer, and Chris Thile. He also performed several of Bach's cello suites for the 2012 film Bill W. On October 5, 2015, he appeared on The Late Show with Stephen Colbert in support of ballerina Misty Copeland and prematurely celebrating his 60th birthday. In August 2018, Ma appeared on NPR's Tiny Desk Concerts.

On June 19, 2020, the group of musicians that recorded The Goat Rodeo Sessions released a second album, Not Our First Goat Rodeo. On September 1, the group performed a virtual concert of some songs from Not Our First Goat Rodeo on NPR's Tiny Desk Concerts.

On June 13, 2021, Ma was the guest on BBC Radio 4's Desert Island Discs. His musical choices included "Tin Tin Deo" by the Oscar Peterson Trio and "Podmoskovnye Vechera – Moscow Nights" by Vasily Solovyov-Sedoi. He selected as his book the 24 volumes of the Encyclopædia Britannica, and as his luxury item a Swiss Army knife. He said his career in music felt like a "gift" after scoliosis threatened his ability to play in his 20s. In 2022, Ma made a cameo as himself in the Netflix film Glass Onion: A Knives Out Mystery.

== Personal life ==
Since 1978, Ma has been married to Jill Hornor, an arts consultant. They have two children, Nicholas and Emily. In 2001, People magazine "tagged" Ma as the "Sexiest Classical Musician". He has said he considers it the "worst epithet he's ever faced". He has continued to receive such accolades over the years, including from AARP in 2012, when Ma was named one of the "21 sexiest men over 50".

According to research presented by Harvard professor Henry Louis Gates Jr. for the PBS series Faces of America, a relative hid the Ma family genealogy in his home in China to save it from destruction during the Cultural Revolution. Ma's paternal ancestry can be traced back 18 generations to the year 1217. The genealogy was compiled in the 18th century by an ancestor, tracing everyone with the surname Ma through the paternal line back to a common ancestor in the 3rd century BC. Ma's generation name, Yo, was decided by his fourth great grand-uncle, Ma Ji Cang, in 1755. DNA research revealed that Ma is distantly related to actress Eva Longoria.

Aside from English, Ma is fluent in Mandarin Chinese and French.

== Discography ==
Ma's albums include recordings of cello concertos, sonatas for cello and piano, works for solo cello, and a variety of chamber music. He has also recorded in non-classical styles with artists such as Bobby McFerrin, Carlos Santana, Chris Botti, Chris Thile, Diana Krall, James Taylor, Miley Cyrus, and Sting.

== Awards and recognition ==
Grammy Award

Grammy Award for Best Chamber Music Performance:

- 1986: Brahms: Cello and Piano Sonatas in E Minor Op. 38, and F Op. 99
- 1987: Beethoven: Cello and Piano Sonata No. 4 in C & Variations
- 1992: Brahms: Piano Quartets Op. 25, Op. 26
- 1993: Brahms: Sonatas for Cello & Piano
- 1996: Brahms/Beethoven/Mozart: Clarinet Trios

Grammy Award for Best Instrumental Soloist Performance:

- 1985: Bach: The Unaccompanied Cello Suites

Grammy Award for Best Instrumental Soloist(s) Performance:

- 1990: Barber: Cello Concerto, Op. 22/Britten: Symphony for Cello and Orchestra, Op. 68
- 1993: Prokofiev: Sinfonia Concertante/Tchaikovsky: Variations on a Rococo Theme
- 1995: The New York Album – Works of Albert, Bartók & Bloch
- 1998: Yo-Yo Ma Premieres – Danielpour, Kirchner, Rouse

Grammy Award for Best Classical Instrumental Solo:

- 2026: Shostakovich: The Cello Concertos

Grammy Award for Best Classical Contemporary Composition:

- 1995: The New York Album, Stephen Albert: Cello Concerto

Grammy Award for Best Classical Album:

- 1998: Yo-Yo Ma Premieres – Danielpour, Kirchner, Rouse

Grammy Award for Best Classical Crossover Album:

- 1999: Soul of the Tango – The Music of Astor Piazzolla
- 2001: Appalachian Journey
- 2004: Obrigado Brazil
- 2009: Songs of Joy & Peace

Grammy Award for Best Folk Album:

- 2012: The Goat Rodeo Sessions w/ Stuart Duncan, Edgar Meyer & Chris Thile

Grammy Award for Best World Music Album:

- 2017: Sing Me Home – Yo-Yo Ma & The Silk Road Ensemble

Grammy Award for Best Chamber Music/Small Ensemble Performance:

- 2022: Beethoven: Cello Sonatas - Hope and Tears – Yo-Yo Ma & Emanuel Ax

=== Honorary doctorates ===
- 1991: Honorary Doctor of Music, Harvard University
- 2005: Honorary Doctor of Musical Arts, Princeton University
- 2019: Honorary Doctor of Music, University of Oxford
- 2019: Honorary Doctor of Arts, Dartmouth College
- 2021: Honorary Doctor of Fine Arts, Mount Holyoke College
- 2022: Honorary Doctor of Music, Stony Brook University
- 2022: Honorary Doctor of Music, Columbia University

Others

- 1978: Avery Fisher Prize
- 1993: Member of the American Academy of Arts and Sciences
- 1999: The Glenn Gould Prize
- 1999: Member of the American Philosophical Society
- 2001: National Medal of Arts
- 2004: Harvard Arts Medal
- 2004: Latin Grammy for Best Instrumental Album at the Latin Grammy Awards for Obrigado Brazil
- 2006: Dan David Prize
- 2006: Léonie Sonning Music Prize
- 2011: Kennedy Center Honor
- 2011: Presidential Medal of Freedom
- 2012: Polar Music Prize
- 2012: Songlines Music Awards - Best Cross-Cultural Collaboration for The Goat Rodeo Sessions
- 2013: Gramophone Hall of Fame inductee
- 2013: Vilcek Prize in Contemporary Music
- 2014: Fred Rogers Legacy Award - Inaugural Recipient. Upon reception of the award, Ma stated, "This is perhaps the greatest honor I've ever received."
- 2016: Commander of the Order of Arts and Letters
- 2020: Asia Game Changer Award from the Asia Society
- 2021: Praemium Imperiale
- 2022: Birgit Nilsson Prize
- 2024: Royal Philharmonic Society Gold Medal
