= The Other Side of the Wind (soundtrack) =

The Other Side of the Wind (Original Motion Picture Soundtrack)

Film score by Michel Legrand
- Released: November 5, 2018
- Genre: Film score
- Length: 72:51
- Label: La-La Land Records
- Producer: Michel Legrand

Michel Legrand chronology
J'ai perdu Albert (2018)	The Other Side of the Wind (2018)	May December (2023)

The Other Side of the Wind (Original Motion Picture Soundtrack) is the soundtrack to the 2018 film of the same name. It is composed by Michel Legrand whose score being the final one to be released after his death on January 26, 2019. La-La Land Records published the score on November 5, 2018.

== Background ==
"We wanted a ’70s score and in many respects that’s exactly what we got. Knowing Orson, knowing the period, he was being true to Orson, and true to the film"

— Filip Jan Rymsza

The Other Side of the Wind marked Legrand's second collaboration with the late-American filmmaker Orson Welles, 44 years after scoring F for Fake (1974). Although he worked on that film, for more than a year, Welles told Legrand on another possible collaboration which the latter did not hear about that for forty years, but felt that the very subject of the film, touched him, which was the idea of the passage of time and the renewal of inspiration. Since the narrative consists of a film-within-a-film construction, Legrand felt it challenging to score several layers in the story, and the film's turbulent production for over forty years, resulting in being the film with the longest production time.

Welles' annotated script contained notes which had "mentions of jazz score" and several kinds of music at a party, according to producer Filip Jan Rymsza who realized that this could be used as a dramatic score. Since Legrand had hoped to score the film long ago, he enthusiastically accepted the offer, spending two months to create a score beginning January 2018, that encompass every aspect of the film: music for the party, film within a film and dramatic underscore for the film itself. Like the film, the music itself is unconventional, where Legrand broke the narrative into chapters of a novel and had written nearly two hours of music.

Legrand described the score as "somewhere between a fugue, a swing-jazz trio, the influence of the Second Viennese School [such 20th-century modernists as Arnold Schoenberg] and a piano duo where one is jazz and the other classical" which also shared similarities with his score for F for Fake. The score is a "combination of piano and dramatic percussion" to give a complex avant-garde feeling. The recording began in mid-March, during that time where Legrand was hospitalized with pneumonia and was "in critical condition", and he could not oversee the recording of the two-day orchestral session in Belgium, and another two-day recording of a big band and jazz trio in Paris. After that, he recovered a month later, though he was late to participate in the post-production process. During that period, editor Murawski and music editor Ellen Segal tried to fit in Legrand's music to the film, where they had to scramble within the deadline for screening at the Cannes Film Festival, which ultimately did not happen as the festival barred premiere of streaming releases. They felt that the wall-to-wall music being "too different to entertain" but 45 minutes of music remained in the film, that included traditional score, jazz and avant-garde.

One of the most unexpected pieces, included the piece that played under Bogdanovich's opening narration, named "Les delinquants" from the French film L'Amerique insolite (1959), directed by François Reichenbach, whose unfinished documentary on art forgery which Welles had turned into F for Fake.

The soundtrack contained over one hour of Legrand's music featured in the film, with the producers hoping that the full score would be released along with the Blu-ray alternate version of the film. Unlike being named into separate titles attributed to the setting of the film, it was divided into chapters, with the name "Chapter 1", "chapter 2" and so on. La-La Land Records released 16 cues from the score on November 5, 2018.

== Track listing ==
No.	Title	Length
1.	"Chapter 1"	4:10
2.	"Chapter 7"	2:18
3.	"Les Délinquants" (Opening Credits)	4:26
4.	"Chapter 3"	2:28
5.	"Chapter 5"	1:10
6.	"Chapter 15" (The Maze)	7:59
7.	"Chapter 4"	3:13
8.	"Chapter 21" (Piano Duet I)	3:58
9.	"Chapter 19"	7:00
10.	"Chapter 11"	2:14
11.	"Chapter 9"	3:51
12.	"Chapter 17"	5:23
13.	"Chapter 23" (Piano Duet II)	2:34
14.	"Chapter 10"	5:21
15.	"Chapter 25"	1:38
16.	"Chapter 26"	15:08
Total length:		72:51

== Reception ==
Jonathan Romney of Screen International wrote that "the period element has been perfectly fine-tuned by the addition of a magnificent new jazz score by Michel Legrand, along with much pop and rock of the era". Richard Brody of The New Yorker felt that Legrand's music is "mainly apt but occasionally heavy-handed". Ian Freer of Empire wrote "Michel Legrand’s terrific jazzy new score is period-specific without ever feeling kitsch — and yet still feels avant-garde." Eric Kohn of IndieWire wrote Legrand's "absorbing new score and the hectic atmosphere keep the mayhem moving forward at an engaging clip". David Morgan of CBS News praised Legrand's score saying "any film buff worth their salt should jump at the chance to see it".
