= Gérard Patris =

French director (1931–1990)

Gérard Patris (1931–1990) was a French film director and television director who died in a car accident in 1990 in Chailles. His works include the documentary film Arthur Rubinstein – The Love of Life.

== Biography ==
After high school in Poitiers, Gérard Patris joined an art school in Paris. Early in his career, Patris founded a lithography workshop, which allowed him to meet many of the major artists of the post-war period for the acquisition of prints, such as Dubuffet, Sprockets, Manessier, Sonderborg, Arman, Hayter, Hartung, and Matta. Gérard Patris had two daughters from different partners. The late muse of Picasso, Sylvette David (now in her 70s and known as Lydia Corbett, see Sylvette), and Marie-Claire Schaeffer, his first wife, were the two mothers. Marie-Claire Schaeffer is the daughter of composer Pierre Schaeffer, often presented as the father of music concrete. This meeting enabled him to participate in the ORTF's research service to create relationships between sound, text, and image, under the direction of Pierre Schaeffer. Gérard Patris was the founder of "The Movies Chesnaie", unit production television whose workshops were based in the cars of the clinical Chailles. His various encounters with artists from the worlds of music, painting, and sculpture made up the core of his filmography.

== Filmography ==
- 1962 : Caustiques (8 min);
- 1966: Spontané III de Luc Ferrari. Improvisation pour huit exécutants. La séance de travail au cours de laquelle « Spontané III » a été exécutée, a été filmée (court-métrage en 16 mm) par G. Patris;
- 1962: Spontané IV de Luc Ferrari. Improvisation pour onze exécutants. L'exécution de « Spontané IV » a été filmée par G. Patris et a donné lieu à un court-métrage couleur 35 mm (juin 1962);
- 1963: Auto portrait (sur Dubuffet) 29 min; Service de la Recherche de l'O.R.T.F. / Pléiade;
- 1965-1966: Réalisation, avec Luc Ferrari d’une série d'émissions (5 16 mm double bande de 45 et 55 min) sur la musique contemporaine pour la télévision française : Les Grandes Répétitions (Olivier Messiaen, Edgard Varèse, Karlheinz Stockhausen, Hermann Scherchen, Cecil Taylor). Outre l’importance des auteurs de cette série, c’est la première fois, ou l’une des premières fois que l’ORTF diffusait de la musique contemporaine;
- 1965 : La chute d'Icare (11 min) Service de la Recherche de l'O.R.T.F.;
  - 1965: Et expecto resurrectionem mortuorum sur Olivier Messiaen, à l'occasion de la création de l'œuvre dans la cathédrale de Chartres, en présence du Général de Gaulle;
  - 1966: Hommage à Varèse, portrait-souvenir dans lequel plusieurs autres compositeurs contemporains apportent leurs précieux témoignages;
  - 1966: Momente avec Karlheinz Stockhausen. Dans cet opus, le compositeur répète avec l'orchestre, pour la création dune de ses œuvres;
  - 1966: Quand un homme consacre sa vie à la musique, portrait de Hermann Scherchen, altiste et chef d’orchestre, pionnier et franc-tireur musical;
- 1966: De l'autre côté du chemin de fer (sur Cecil Taylor ou la découverte du free jazz. Film en couleur, 35 mm. INA, Paris;
- 1966: Les enfants grecs (16 min) Pour le plaisir / Nedjar;
- 1966: Parade (20 min) sur S. Dali Pour le plaisir;
- 1966: Rien ne va plus (20 min) Pour le plaisir;
- 1966: Ecole de Nice (20 min) sur Arman Ben Raysse Pour le plaisir;
- 1966: A propos d'un crime (20 min) sur A. Camus Recherche / Alger Production;
- 1969: Arthur Rubinstein – The Love of Life (L’amour de la vie – Arthur Rubistein) (co-réalisé par François Reichenbach - 90 min). Trois mois de la vie quotidienne de l’éminent pianiste qui, à 83 ans raconte certains épisodes de sa vie et ses engagements dans divers lieux marquants de son parcours familial, professionnel et personnel. Ce documentaire obtint en 1970 l’Academy Award for best documentary. Caméra sur l'épaule, François Reichenbach avait suivi Arthur Rubinstein de longs mois. Le vénérable pianiste avait « adopté » le cinéaste, le critique Bernard Gavoty et le réalisateur Gérard Patris. Ils avaient pu le filmer juste avant qu'il n'entre en scène ou lors d'une répétition tendue France Opéra films / MIDEM;
- 1967: Naissance d'un opéra (52 min) sur H. Von Karajan;
- 1970: Carmen (150 min) directed by Herbert von Karajan where G. Patris assure la direction du montage. Directeur de la photographie et co-réalisateur : F. Reichenbach France Opéra / Cosmotel Munich;
- 1970: 9^{e} symphonie dans lequel il assure le scénario et le découpage Cosmotel Munich
- 1971: Medicine ball caravan. Producteur associé Martin Scorsese (non crédité) et F. Reichenbach. Un documentaire sur le parcours de musiciens célèbres qui répandent le "flower power" à travers les Etats-Unis d’Amérique lors de prestations scéniques;
- 1971: Un homme de Russie (90 min) sur Mstislav Rostropovitch MIDEM
- 1972: My name is Stern (90 min) Sur Isaac Stern MIDEM;
- 1973: Trans und so weiter (60 min) sur Karlheinz Stockhausen Wellnitz / ZDF / RTB
- 1973: Proximities et Calligraph for martyrs (2 x 30 min) sur les ballets Murray Louis;
- 1973: Histoires naturelles (60 min) sur Max Ernst UNESCO / INA;
- 1974: La famille de mon frère (80 min) Reportage dramatisé INA;
- 1975: Denier théâtre, Camélias-souvenirs Co-auteur Dupavillon INA;
- 1975: Adieu ma petite Léonie (60 min) Reportage Série Inventaire INA;
- 1976: Le château et la chaumière (80 min) sur Jean Guitton TF1 / INA;
- 1976: Anthologie poétique (30 min) sur Jude Stephan INA;
- 1977: Les apprentis (90 min) sur Boris Vian Sud West Funk / INA;
- 1977: Musées de France 2 spots publicitaires de 90 s Franco American Films;
- 1977: Les Apprentis 16 mm double bande de 1 h 20. Musique de Luc Ferrari;
- 1978: Schubert (60 min) avec Christa Ludwig et Hermann Prey TV Bavaroise
- 1979: Mélodrame ce soir (58 min) Archives TV FR3 / INA
- 1980: La liberté de l'esprit (2 x 52 min) sur la Renaissance Agence française d'Images
- 1989-1991: L’ Anthropographe, néologisme pour une série de huit 55 minutes (La Chesnaie Films- La S.E.P.T.-Arte, unité de production audiovisuelle Thierry Garel) au format Beta sur ce qui pourrait dessiner les limites de l’homme (la mort, le deuil, la perte, la maladie, la souffrance...). L’Anthropographe tend à montrer, à travers divers aspects de la vie quotidienne, « comment intervient l’imaginaire dans les existences d’aujourd’hui »;
- 1986: Solitudes (La Chesnaie Films- La S.E.P.T.-Arte) avec les pensionnaires de la clinique psychiatrique de la Chesnaie (Chailles 41). 2 fois primé au Festival du Cinéma du Réel;
- 1986: Médiums 55 min (La S.E.P.T.-Arte) avec M.-C Pouchelle du CNRS. L'univers des médiums et le rapport avec le public consultant;
- 1987: Dialogue secret (La S.E.P.T.-Arte). La parole intérieure chez quelques-uns de nos contemporains;
- 1987: Arte Maga (La S.E.P.T.-Arte) avec L. Désidéri. Actualité du mythe en Corse et pratiques magiques;
- 1988: Le petit chat est mort (La Chesnaie Films-La S.E.P.T.-Arte) avec C. Pétonnet. Signification de la mort des animaux domestiques en milieu urbain;
- 1989: Le commerce amoureux» (La S.E.P.T.-Arte). L'univers des agences matrimoniales et de ses « clients »";
- 1989: Cancer (La S.E.P.T.-Arte) avec J.-P. Hélary. Paroles de malades dans le service d'oncologie du Pr Schraub, à l'hôpital de Besançon;
- 1990: La saison du brâme (La S.E.P.T.-Arte) avec B. Hell. Chasse au cerf en solitaire dans les Vosges et transmission du savoir cynégétique.
