= Pierre Monteux =

French and American conductor (1875–1964)

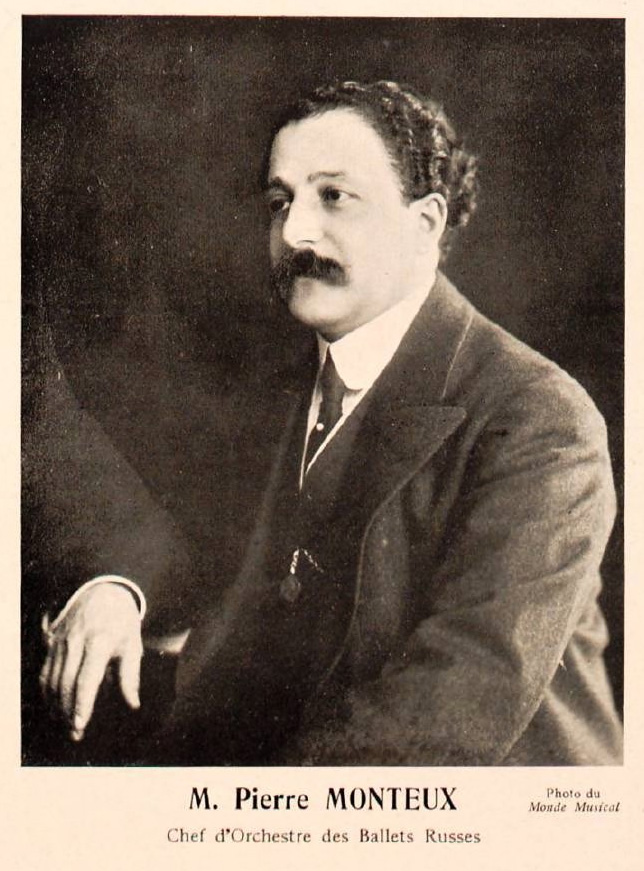
Monteux during his conductorship of Les Ballets Russes, c. 1912

Pierre Benjamin Monteux (pronounced [pjɛʁ mɔ̃.tø]; 4 April 1875 – 1 July 1964) (Note: Monteux disliked the name Benjamin and formally dropped it when he took American citizenship in 1942.) was a French (later American) conductor. After violin and viola studies, and a decade as an orchestral player and occasional conductor, he began to receive regular conducting engagements in 1907. He came to prominence when, for Sergei Diaghilev's Ballets Russes company between 1911 and 1914, he conducted the world premieres of Stravinsky's The Rite of Spring and other prominent works including Petrushka, The Nightingale, Ravel's Daphnis et Chloé, and Debussy's Jeux. Thereafter he directed orchestras around the world for more than half a century.

From 1917 to 1919 Monteux was the principal conductor of the French repertoire at the Metropolitan Opera in New York. He conducted the Boston Symphony Orchestra (1919–24), Amsterdam Concertgebouw Orchestra (1924–34), Orchestre Symphonique de Paris (1929–38) and San Francisco Symphony (1936–52). In 1961, aged eighty-six, he accepted the chief conductorship of the London Symphony Orchestra, a post which he held until his death three years later. Although he was known for his performances of the French repertoire, his chief love was the music of German composers, above all Brahms. He disliked recording, finding it incompatible with spontaneity, but he nevertheless made a substantial number of records.

Monteux was well known as a teacher. In 1932 he began a conducting class in Paris, which he developed into a summer school that was later moved to his summer home in Les Baux in the south of France. After moving permanently to the US in 1942 and taking American citizenship, he founded a school for conductors and orchestral musicians in Hancock, Maine. Among his students in France and America who went on to international fame were Lorin Maazel, Igor Markevitch, Neville Marriner, Seiji Ozawa, André Previn and David Zinman. The school in Hancock has continued since Monteux's death.

== Life and career ==
=== Early years ===
Pierre Monteux was born in Paris, the third son and the fifth of six children of Gustave Élie Monteux, a shoe salesman, and his wife, Clémence Rebecca née Brisac. The Monteux family was descended from Sephardic Jews who settled in the south of France. The Monteux ancestors included at least one rabbi, but Gustave Monteux and his family were not religious. Among Monteux's brothers were Henri, who became an actor, and Paul (1862-1928), who became a conductor of light music under the name Paul Monteux-Brisac. Gustave Monteux was not musical, but his wife was a graduate of the Conservatoire de Musique de Marseille and gave piano lessons. Pierre took violin lessons from the age of six.

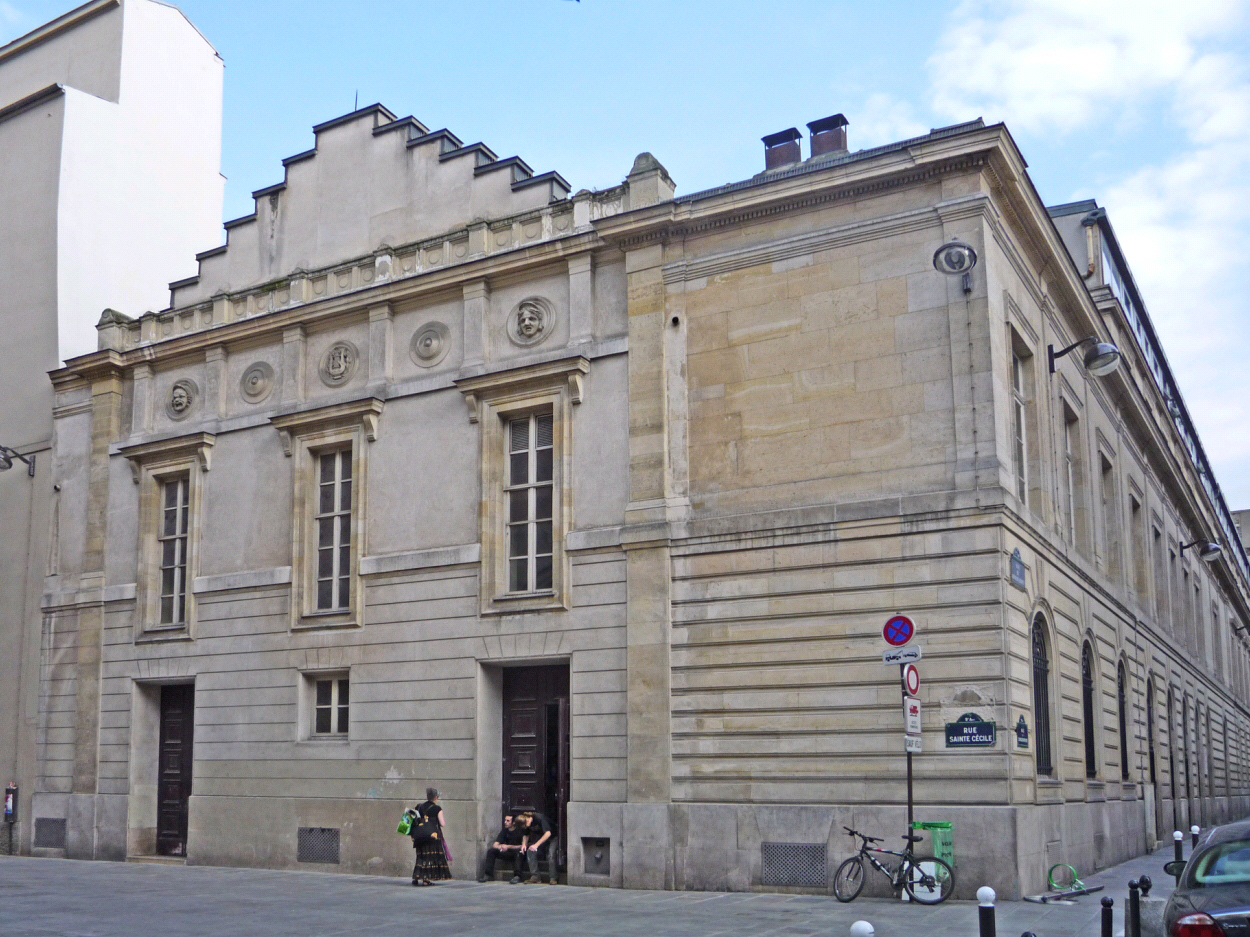
The building which housed the Paris Conservatoire in Monteux's student days (21st century photograph)

When he was nine years old Monteux was admitted to the Conservatoire de Paris. He studied the violin with Jules Garcin and Henri Berthelier, composition with Charles Lenepveu, and harmony and theory with Albert Lavignac. His fellow violin students included George Enescu, Carl Flesch, Fritz Kreisler and Jacques Thibaud. Among the piano students at the Conservatoire was Alfred Cortot, with whom he developed a lifelong friendship. At the age of twelve, Monteux organised and conducted a small orchestra of Conservatoire students to accompany Cortot in performances of concertos in and around Paris. He attended the world premiere of César Franck's Symphony in February 1889. From 1889 to 1892, while still a student, he played in the orchestra of the Folies Bergère; he later said to George Gershwin that his rhythmic sense was formed during the experience of playing popular dance music there.

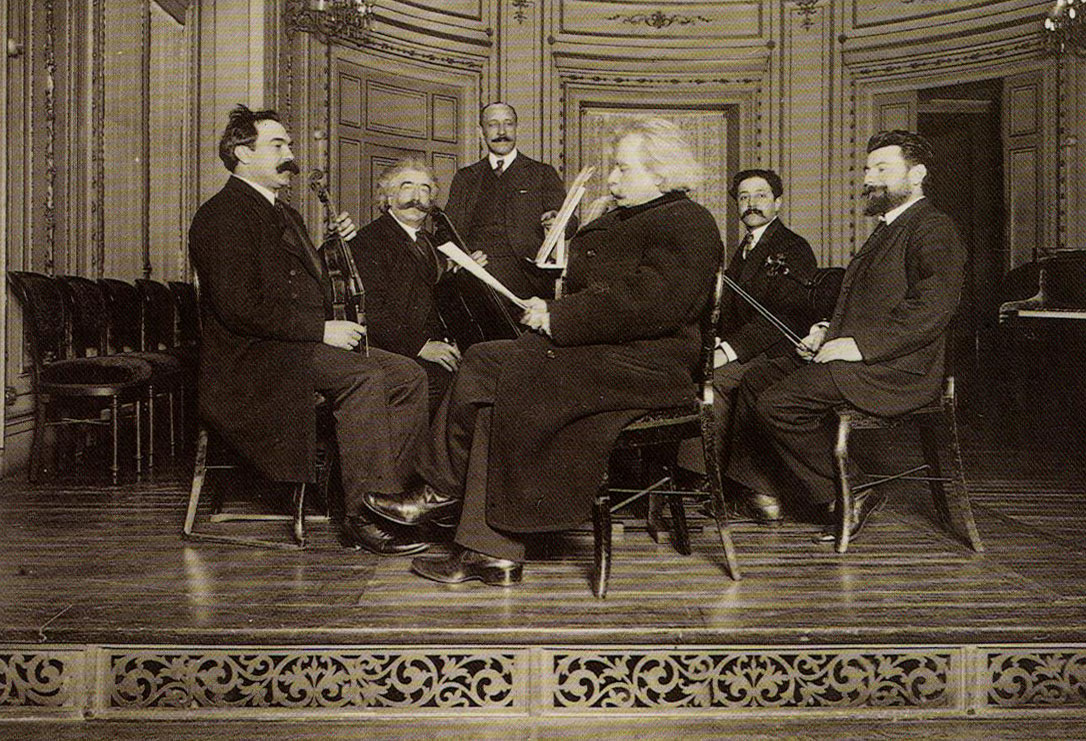
Monteux as viola player in quartets (2nd from right), with Johannes Wolff, Joseph Hollmann and André Dulaurons, and with Gustave Lyon (Administrateur Délégué of Pleyel) at the rear and Edvard Grieg in front, Salle Pleyel, April 1903.

At the age of fifteen, while continuing his violin studies, Monteux took up the viola. He studied privately with Benjamin Godard, with whom he performed in the premiere of Saint-Saëns's Septet, with the composer at the keyboard. Monteux joined the Geloso Quartet as violist; he played many concerts with them, including a performance of Fauré's Second Piano Quartet with the composer at the piano. On another occasion he was the violist in a private performance of a Brahms quartet given before the composer in Vienna. Monteux recalled Brahms's remark, "It takes the French to play my music properly. The Germans all play it much too heavily." Monteux remained a member of the Geloso Quartet until 1911. With Johannes Wolff and Joseph Hollman he also played chamber music for Grieg. Years later, in his seventies, Monteux deputised with the Budapest Quartet without rehearsal or score; asked by Erik Smith if he could write out the parts of the seventeen Beethoven quartets, he replied, "You know, I cannot forget them."

In 1893, when he was eighteen, Monteux married a fellow student, the pianist Victoria Barrière. With her he played the complete Beethoven violin sonatas in public. Neither family approved of the marriage; although the Monteux family were not religious, both they and the Roman Catholic Barrières were doubtful about an inter-religious marriage; furthermore, both families thought the couple too young to marry. There were a son and a daughter from the union.

During his formative years Monteux belonged to a group which toured with the Casadesus family of musicians and the pianist Alfredo Casella. The combination played supposed "ancient pieces", allegedly discovered in libraries by one or other of the Casadesus family; Marius Casadesus later revealed that he or his brother Henri had written the music. While still a student, in 1893 Monteux was successful in the competition for the chair of first viola of the Concerts Colonne, of which he became assistant conductor and choirmaster the following year. This gave him a link via the orchestra's founder, Édouard Colonne, to Berlioz. Colonne had known Berlioz, and through the older conductor Monteux was able to mark his scores with notes based on the composer's intentions. (Note: These scores were stolen from his Paris apartment by the Nazis in the Second World War and lost.) He was also employed on a freelance basis at the Opéra-Comique, where he continued to play from time to time for several years; he led the viola section at the 1902 premiere of Pelléas et Mélisande under the baton of André Messager. In 1896 he graduated from the Conservatoire, sharing first prize for violin with Thibaud.

=== First conducting posts ===
Saint-Saëns at the keyboard, with Monteux (right) on the rostrum, 1913

Monteux's first high-profile conducting experience came in 1895, when he was barely 20 years old. He was a member of the orchestra engaged for a performance of Saint-Saëns's oratorio La lyre et la harpe, to be conducted by the composer. At the last minute Saint-Saëns judged the player engaged for the important and difficult organ part to be inadequate and, as a celebrated virtuoso organist, decided to play it himself. He asked the orchestra if any of them could take over as conductor; there was a chorus of "Oui – Monteux!". With great trepidation, Monteux conducted the orchestra and soloists including the composer, sight-reading the score, and was judged a success.

Monteux's musical career was interrupted in 1896, when he was called up for military service. As a graduate of the Conservatoire, one of France's grandes écoles, he was required to serve only ten months rather than the three years generally required. He later described himself as "the most pitifully inadequate soldier that the 132nd Infantry had ever seen". He had inherited from his mother not only her musical talent but her short and portly build and was physically unsuited to soldiering.

Returning to Paris after discharge, Monteux resumed his career as a violist. Hans Richter invited him to lead the violas in the Bayreuth Festival orchestra, but Monteux could not afford to leave his regular work in Paris. In December 1900 Monteux played the solo viola part in Berlioz's Harold in Italy, rarely heard in Paris at the time, with the Colonne Orchestra conducted by Felix Mottl. In 1902 he secured a junior conducting post at the Dieppe casino, a seasonal appointment for the summer months which brought him into contact with leading musicians from the Paris orchestras and well-known soloists on vacation. By 1907 he was the principal conductor at Dieppe, in charge of operas and orchestral concerts. (Note: The operas Monteux conducted at Dieppe included Aida, La bohème, Carmen, Cavalleria rusticana, Faust, Manon, Pagliacci, Rigoletto, Samson et Dalila, Thaïs, Tosca and La traviata.) As an orchestral conductor he modelled his technique on that of Arthur Nikisch, under whose baton he had played, and who was his ideal conductor. (Note: Canarina notes that among Monteux's contemporaries Fritz Reiner and Sir Adrian Boult were also profoundly influenced by Nikisch, and, like Monteux, were known for their unshowy podium personas. Among the other guest conductors of the Concerts Colonne during Monteux's time with the orchestra were Gustav Mahler, Hans Richter, Richard Strauss and Felix Weingartner.)

=== Ballets Russes ===
For some time, Monteux's marriage had been under strain, exacerbated by his wife's frequent absences on concert tours. The couple were divorced in 1909; Monteux married one of her former pupils, Germaine Benedictus, the following year.

Monteux continued to play in the Concerts Colonne through the first decade of the century. In 1910 Colonne died and was succeeded as principal conductor by Gabriel Pierné. As well as leading the violas, Monteux was assistant conductor, taking charge of early rehearsals and acting as chorus master for choral works. In 1910 the orchestra was engaged to play for a Paris season given by Sergei Diaghilev's ballet company, the Ballets Russes. Monteux played under Pierné in the world premiere of Stravinsky's The Firebird. In 1911 Diaghilev engaged Nikolai Tcherepnin to conduct the premiere of Stravinsky's Petrushka. Monteux conducted the preliminary rehearsals before Tcherepnin arrived; Stravinsky was so impressed that he insisted that Monteux conduct the premiere.

Stravinsky (l) with Nijinsky as Petrushka, 1911

Petrushka was part of a triple bill, all conducted by Monteux. The other two pieces were Le Spectre de la Rose and Scheherazade, a balletic adaptation of Rimsky-Korsakov's symphonic suite of the same name. The three works were choreographed by Fokine. In later years Monteux disapproved of the appropriation of symphonic music for ballets, but he made an exception for Scheherazade, and, as his biographer John Canarina observes, at that stage in his career his views on the matter carried little weight. Petrushka was a success with the public and with all but the most diehard conservative critics.

Following the Paris season Diaghilev appointed Monteux principal conductor for a tour of Europe in late 1911 and early 1912. It began with a five-week season at the Royal Opera House in London. The press notices concentrated on the dancers, who included Anna Pavlova as well as the regular stars of the Ballets Russes, but Monteux received some words of praise. The Times commented on the excellent unanimity he secured from the players, apart from "occasional uncertainty in the changes of tempo."

After its season in London the company performed in Vienna, Budapest, Prague and Berlin. The tour was successful, artistically and financially, but was not without untoward incident. A planned visit to St Petersburg had to be cancelled because the Narodny Dom theatre burned down, and in Vienna the Philharmonic was unequal to the difficulties of the score of Petrushka. The illustrious orchestra revolted at the rehearsal for the first performance, refusing to play for Monteux; only an intervention by Diaghilev restored the rehearsal, by the end of which Monteux was applauded and Stravinsky given an ovation. In the middle of the tour Monteux was briefly summoned back to Paris by the Concerts Colonne, which had the contractual right to recall him, to deputise for Pierné; his own deputy, Désiré-Émile Inghelbrecht, took temporary musical charge of the Ballets Russes.

In May 1912 Diaghilev's company returned to Paris. Monteux was the conductor for the two outstanding works of the season, Vaslav Nijinsky's ballet version of Debussy's Prélude à l'après-midi d'un faune, made with the composer's approval, and Fokine's Daphnis et Chloé to a score commissioned from Ravel. Monteux later recalled "Debussy was behind me when we played L'après midi d'un faune because he did not want anything in his score to be changed on account of the dancing. And when we came to a forte, he said 'Monteux, that is a forte, play forte'. He did not want anything shimmering. And he wanted everything exactly in time".

In February and March 1913 the Ballets Russes presented another London season. As in 1911, the local orchestra engaged was the Beecham Symphony Orchestra. The orchestra's founder, Thomas Beecham, shared the conducting with Monteux. At the end of February Beecham had to take over Petrushka when Monteux suddenly hastened to Paris for four days to be with his wife on the birth of their daughter, Denise. (Note: Beecham learnt the score at two days' notice, but he managed a successful performance with the help of his players, prompting Nijinsky's only known joke: "How well the orchestra is conducting Mr Beecham tonight".)

=== The Rite of Spring ===
During the 1913 Ballets Russes season in Paris, Monteux conducted two more premieres. The first was Jeux, with music by Debussy and choreography by Nijinsky. The choreography was not liked; Monteux thought it "asinine", while Debussy felt that "Nijinsky's cruel and barbarous choreography ... trampled over my poor rhythms like so many weeds". The second new work was Stravinsky's The Rite of Spring given under the French title, Le sacre du printemps. Monteux had been appalled when Stravinsky first played the score at the piano:

I decided then and there that the symphonies of Beethoven and Brahms were the only music for me, not the music of this crazy Russian. ... My one desire was to flee that room and find a quiet corner in which to rest my aching head. Then [Diaghilev] turned to me and with a smile said, "This is a masterpiece, Monteux, which will completely revolutionize music and make you famous, because you are going to conduct it." And, of course, I did.

Despite his initial reaction, Monteux worked with Stravinsky, giving practical advice to help the composer to achieve the orchestral balance and effects he sought. Together they worked on the score from March to May 1913, and to get the orchestra of the Théâtre des Champs-Élysées to cope with the unfamiliar and difficult music Monteux held seventeen rehearsals, an unusually large number. Monteux's real attitude to the score is unclear. In his old age he told a biographer, "I did not like Le Sacre then. I have conducted it fifty times since. I do not like it now." However, he told his wife in 1963 that the Rite was "now fifty years old, and I do not think it has aged at all. I had pleasure in conducting the fiftieth anniversary of Le Sacre this spring".

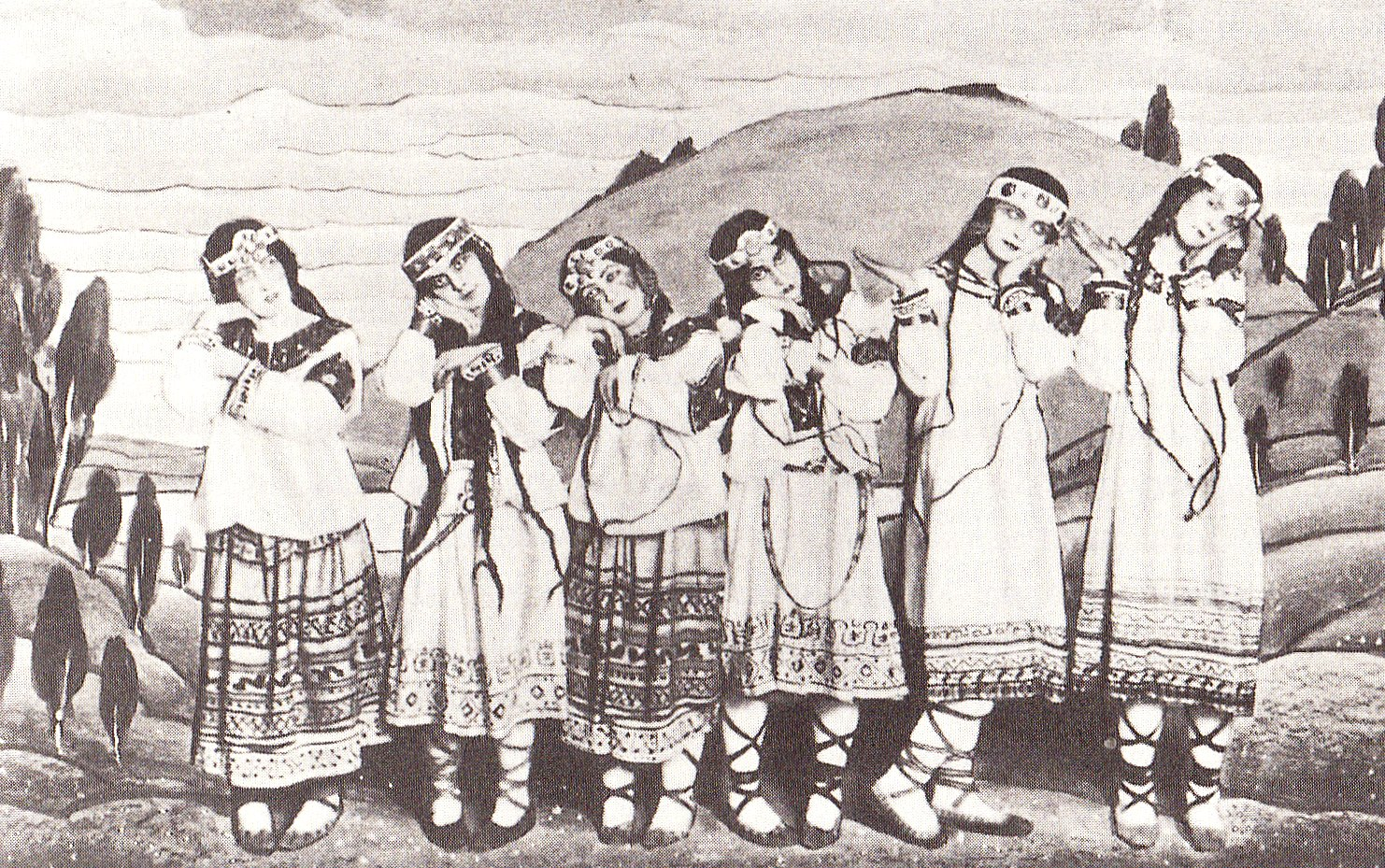
Dancers in Nikolai Roerich's costumes for The Rite of Spring: "knock-kneed and long-haired Lolitas jumping up and down"

The dress rehearsal, with Debussy, Ravel, other musicians and critics among those present, passed without incident. However, the following evening the premiere provoked something approaching a riot, with loud verbal abuse of the work, counter-shouts from supporters, and fisticuffs breaking out. Monteux pressed on, continuing to conduct the orchestra regardless of the turmoil behind him. Stravinsky wrote "The image of Monteux's back is more vivid in my mind today than the picture of the stage. He stood there apparently impervious and as nerveless as a crocodile. It is still incredible to me that he actually brought the orchestra through to the end." The extensive press coverage of the incident made Monteux "at age thirty-eight, truly a famous conductor". The company presented the Rite during its London season a few weeks later. The Times reported that although there was "something like a hostile reception" at the first London performance, the final performance in the season "was received with scarcely a sign of opposition". Before the 1913 London performances, Monteux challenged Diaghilev's authority by declaring that he, not the impresario, was the composer's representative in matters related to The Rite of Spring.

Monteux believed that most of the anger aroused by the work was due not to the music but to Nijinsky's choreography, described by Stravinsky as "knock-kneed and long-haired Lolitas jumping up and down". With the composer's agreement Monteux presented a concert performance in Paris in April 1914. Saint-Saëns, who was present, declared Stravinsky mad and left in a rage, but he was almost alone in his dislike. At the end Stravinsky was carried shoulder-high from the theatre after what he described as "the most beautiful performance that I have had of the Sacre du printemps". That performance was part of a series of "Concerts Monteux", presented between February and April 1914, in which Monteux conducted the orchestra of the Théâtre des Champs-Élysées in a wide range of symphonic and concertante works, including the concert premiere of the orchestral version of Ravel's Valses nobles et sentimentales. His last notable engagement before the outbreak of war was as conductor of the premiere of Stravinsky's opera The Nightingale at the Palais Garnier.

=== The Met and Boston ===
Singing under Monteux at the Met: clockwise from top l. Geraldine Farrar, Louise Homer, Giovanni Martinelli and Enrico Caruso

After the outbreak of the First World War Monteux was again conscripted into the army, serving as a private in the 35th Territorial Regiment, with which he saw action in the trenches at Verdun, Soissons and the Argonne. He later described much of this period as one of "filth and boredom", although he formed a scratch band to divert his fellow soldiers. After just over two years on active service he was released from military duties after Diaghilev prevailed on the French government to second Monteux to conduct the Ballets Russes on a North American tour. (Note: Canarina speculates that Diaghilev's efforts may have been aided by the fact that Monteux's old friend Cortot was Minister of Culture in the government.) The tour took in fifty-four cities in the US and Canada. In New York in 1916 Monteux refused to conduct Nijinsky's new ballet Till Eulenspiegel as the music was by a German – Richard Strauss – so a conductor had to be engaged for those performances. At the end of the tour Monteux was offered a three-year contract to conduct the French repertoire at the Metropolitan Opera in New York, and received the permission of the French government to remain in the US.

At the Met (as the Metropolitan Opera is generally called), Monteux conducted familiar French works such as Faust, Carmen and Samson and Delilah, with singers including Enrico Caruso, Geraldine Farrar, Louise Homer and Giovanni Martinelli. Of his first appearance, The New York Times said, "Mr. Monteux conducted with skill and authority. He made it evident that he had ample knowledge of the score and control of the orchestra – an unmistakably rhythmic beat, a sense of dramatic values." Monteux conducted the American premieres of Rimsky-Korsakov's The Golden Cockerel, and Henri Rabaud's Mârouf, savetier du Caire. The American premiere of Petrushka, in a new production by, and starring, Adolph Bolm, was in an unusual opera-ballet double bill with La traviata. Monteux's performances were well received, but, though he later returned to the Met as a guest, opera did not loom large in his career. He said, "I love conducting opera. The only trouble is that I hate the atmosphere of the opera house, where only too often music is the least of many considerations, from staging to the temperaments of the principal singers." Nor was he drawn to further engagements as a ballet conductor: "it offers special problems of fitting in with the dances and the dancers, most of whom, I'm sorry to say, seem to have musical appreciation confined to an ability to count beats." Nonetheless he occasionally conducted ballet performances, and even in his concert performances of the ballet scores he had conducted for Diaghilev he said he always had the dancers in his mind's eye.

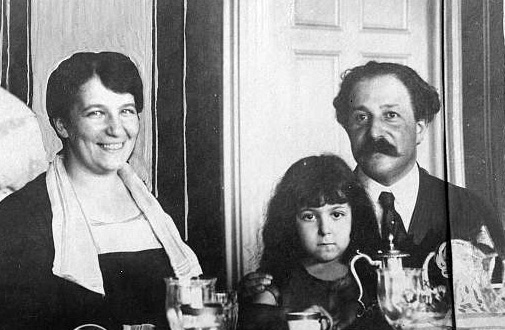
Germaine, Denise and Pierre Monteux, circa 1919

In 1919 Monteux was appointed chief conductor of the Boston Symphony Orchestra. The orchestra was going through difficult times; its conductor, Karl Muck, had been forced by anti-German agitation to step down in 1917. Sir Henry Wood turned down the post, and despite press speculation neither Sergei Rachmaninoff nor Arturo Toscanini was appointed. At least twenty-four players of German heritage had been forced out with Muck, and orchestral morale was low. Shortly before Monteux took up the conductorship, the autocratic founder and proprietor of the orchestra, Henry Lee Higginson, died. He had steadfastly resisted unionisation, and after his death a substantial minority of the players resumed the struggle for union recognition. More than thirty players, including two important principals, resigned over the matter. Monteux set about rebuilding the orchestra, auditioning players from all kinds of musical background, some of whom had not played symphonic music before. By the end of his first season he had restored the orchestra to something approaching its normal complement. (Note: Before the resignations there were 96 players; by the end of Monteux's first season numbers had risen from 61 players to 88.) He trained the orchestra to a high standard; according to the critic Neville Cardus, Monteux's musicianship "made the Boston Symphony Orchestra the most refined and musical in the world."

Monteux regularly introduced new compositions in Boston, often works by American, English and French composers. He was proud of the number of novelties presented in his years at Boston, and expressed pleasure that his successors continued the practice. He was dismayed when it was announced that his contract would not be renewed after 1924. The official explanation was that the orchestra's policy had always been to appoint conductors for no more than five years. It is unclear whether that was genuinely the reason. One suggested possibility is that the conductor chosen to replace him, Serge Koussevitzky, was thought more charismatic, with greater box-office appeal. Another is that the primmer members of Boston society disapproved of Monteux's morals: he and his second wife had gradually drifted apart and by 1924 he was living with Doris Hodgkins, an American divorcée, and her two children. They were unable to marry until 1928, when Germaine Monteux finally agreed to a divorce. (Note: Doris Hodgkins (1894–1984) studied at the New England Conservatory of Music and met Monteux when she sang (alto) in the chorus with the Boston Symphony Orchestra.)

=== Amsterdam and Paris ===
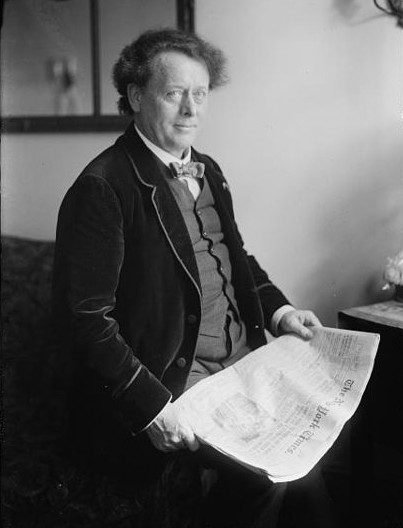
Willem Mengelberg, Monteux's colleague at the Concertgebouw

In 1924, Monteux began a ten-year association with the Concertgebouw Orchestra of Amsterdam, serving as "first conductor" ("eerste dirigent") alongside Willem Mengelberg, its long-serving chief conductor. The two musicians liked and respected one another, despite the difference in their approach to music-making: Monteux was scrupulous in his adherence to a composer's score and straightforward in his performances, while Mengelberg was well known for his virtuoso, sometimes wilful, interpretations and his cavalier attitude to the score ("Ve vill make some changements", as an English player quoted him). Their preferred repertoire overlapped in some of the classics, but Mengelberg had his own favourites from Bach's St. Matthew Passion to Mahler symphonies, and was happy to leave Debussy and Stravinsky to Monteux. Where their choices coincided, as in Beethoven, Brahms and Richard Strauss, Mengelberg was generous in giving Monteux at least his fair share of them.

While in Amsterdam Monteux conducted a number of operas, including Pelléas et Mélisande (its Dutch premiere), Carmen, Les Contes d'Hoffmann, a Lully and Ravel double bill of Acis et Galatée and L'Heure espagnole, Gluck's Iphigénie en Tauride (also brought to the Paris Opéra) and Verdi's Falstaff. Toscanini had been invited to conduct the last of these, but he told the promoters that Monteux was his dearest colleague and the best conductor for Falstaff.

During the first eight years of his association with the Concertgebouw, Monteux conducted between fifty and sixty concerts each season. In his final two years with the orchestra other conductors, notably the rising young Dutchman Eduard van Beinum, were allocated concerts that would previously have been given to Monteux, who amicably withdrew from his position in Amsterdam in 1934. He returned many times as a guest conductor.

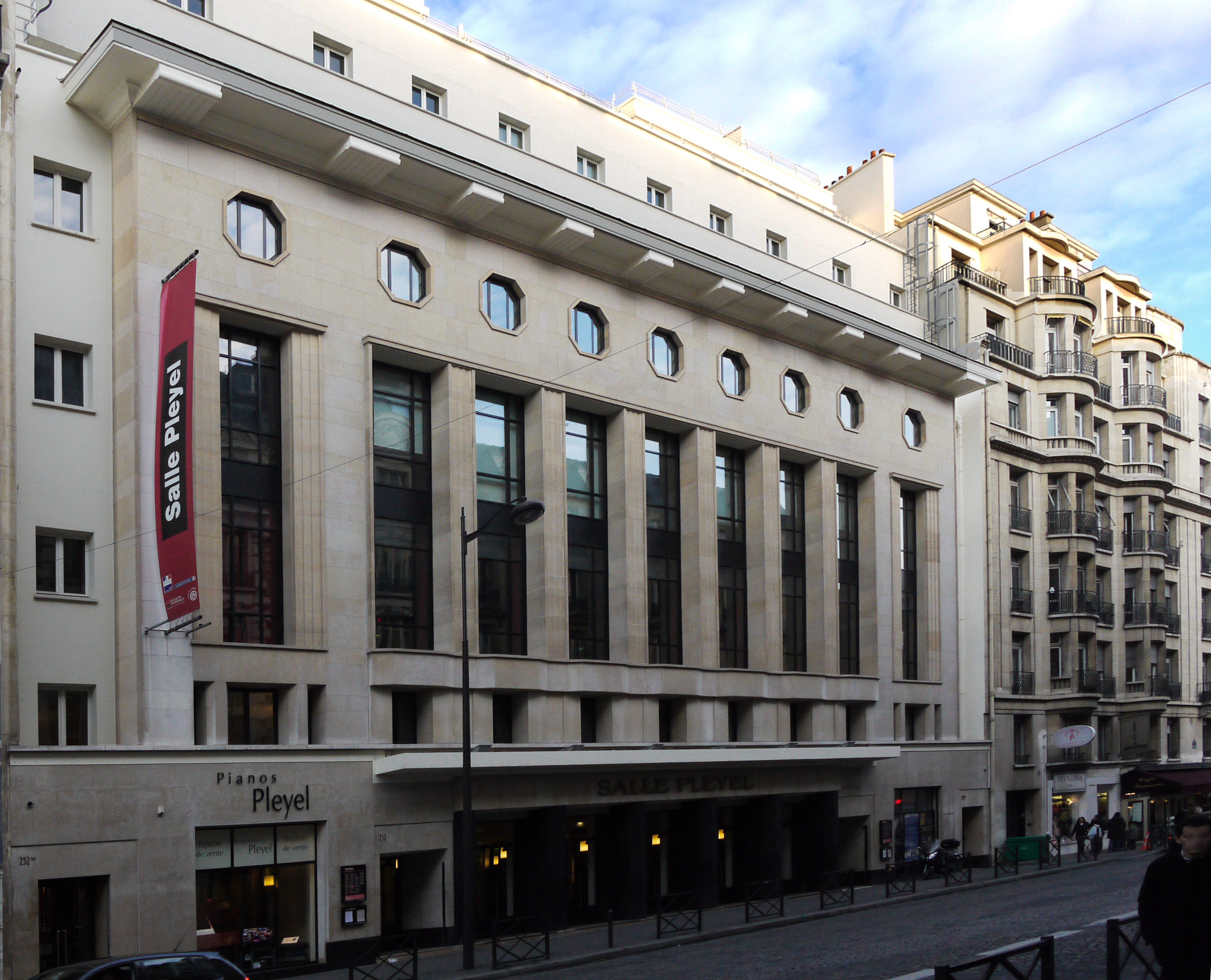
Salle Pleyel, base of the Orchestre Symphonique de Paris

In addition to his work with the Concertgebouw Orchestra, from 1929 Monteux conducted the Orchestre Symphonique de Paris (OSP), founded the previous year. (Note: The Grove Dictionary of Music and Musicians incorrectly states that Monteux founded the OSP in 1929.) The orchestral scene in Paris in the 1920s had been adversely affected by the "deputy" system, whereby any contracted orchestral player was at liberty, if a better engagement became available, to send a deputy to a rehearsal or even to a concert. In most other major cities in Europe and America this practice either had never existed or had been eradicated. Alongside the opera orchestras, four other Paris orchestras were competing for players. In 1928 the arts patron the Princesse de Polignac combined with the fashion designer Coco Chanel to propose a new orchestra, well enough paid to keep its players from taking conflicting engagements. With financial backing assured, they appointed a triumvirate of musicians – Cortot, Ernest Ansermet and Louis Fourestier – to assemble the OSP. The following year Cortot invited Monteux to become the orchestra's artistic director and principal conductor. Ansermet, its initial musical director, was not pleased at being supplanted by a conductor of whom he was reportedly "ragingly jealous", but the composer Darius Milhaud commented on how much better the orchestra played for Monteux "since Ansermet has been sent back to his Swiss pastures".

Monteux considered the OSP one of the finest with which he worked. He conducted it until 1938, premiering many pieces, including Prokofiev's Third Symphony in 1929. The orchestra's generous funding in the first years allowed for ample rehearsals and adventurous programming, presenting contemporary music and the lesser-known works of earlier composers as well as the classic repertoire. In his first season Monteux conducted an all-Stravinsky concert, consisting of the suite from The Firebird and complete performances of Petrushka and The Rite of Spring. The orchestra made European tours in 1930 and 1931, receiving enthusiastic receptions in the Netherlands and Germany. In Berlin the audience could not contain its applause until the end of the Symphonie fantastique, and in Monteux's words "went wild" after the slow movement, the "Scène aux champs". He approved of spontaneous applause, unlike Artur Schnabel, Sir Henry Wood and Leopold Stokowski, who did all they could to stamp out the practice of clapping between movements.

After 1931 the OSP suffered the effects of the Great Depression; much of its funding ceased, and the orchestra reformed itself into a co-operative, pooling such meagre profits as it made. To give the players some extra work Monteux started a series of conducting classes in 1932. From 1936 he held the classes at his summer home in Les Baux in Provence, the forerunner of the school he later set up in the US.

=== San Francisco and the Monteux School ===
Rimsky-Korsakov. Scheherazade, Symphonic Suite, Op. 35
01 The Sea And Sinbads Ship

02 The Story of the Kalandar Prince

03 The Young Prince And Princess

04 Festival at Baghdad The Sea
Scheherazade by Rimsky-Korsakov performed by the San Francisco Symphony Orchestra conducted by Pierre Monteux, with violin solo by Naoum Blinder

Monteux first conducted the San Francisco Symphony Orchestra (SFSO) in 1931, and in 1935 at the age of 60 he was offered the chief conductorship. He was doubtful about accepting, both on personal and on professional grounds. He did not want to leave the OSP, his wife did not want to live on the west coast of America, and the orchestra was so low in funds that it had been forced to cancel an entire season in 1934. Like most orchestras the SFSO had been badly hit financially by the Depression, and it suffered the further difficulty that many of its former players had left for better-paid jobs in Hollywood studios. That problem was exacerbated by the insistence of the Musicians' Union that only local players could be recruited. Monteux nevertheless accepted the appointment. The SFSO concert season was never longer than five months a year, which enabled him to continue working with the OSP, and allowed him to conduct the inaugural concert of the NBC Symphony Orchestra on 13 November 1937. In The New York Times Olin Downes wrote that the new orchestra was "of very high rank" and that the broadcast concert had displayed Monteux "at the height of his powers."

The Times said of Monteux's time in San Francisco that it had "incalculable effect on American musical culture", and gave him "the opportunity to expand his already substantial repertory, and by gradual, natural processes to deepen his understanding of his art." Monteux consistently programmed new or recent music. He generally avoided, as he did throughout his career, atonal or serial works, but his choice of modern works nevertheless drew occasional complaints from conservative-minded members of the San Francisco audience. Among guest conductors with the SFSO during Monteux's years were John Barbirolli, Beecham, Otto Klemperer, Stokowski and Stravinsky. (Note: Monteux regularly invited Stravinsky to conduct the SFSO, giving him generous fees and ample rehearsal time.) Soloists included the pianists George Gershwin, Rachmaninoff, Arthur Rubinstein and Schnabel, the violinists Jascha Heifetz, Yehudi Menuhin and the young Isaac Stern, and singers such as Kirsten Flagstad and Alexander Kipnis. Almost all his seventeen San Francisco seasons concluded with Beethoven's Ninth Symphony. Monteux's SFSO studio recordings were mainly made in the cavernous acoustics of War Memorial Opera House (without an audience) with the music transmitted over telephone wires to a Los Angeles studio and recorded on film there. Confined to the US for the years of the Second World War, in 1942 Monteux took American citizenship.

Monteux wished to continue his work in helping young conductors: "Conducting is not enough. I must create something. I am not a composer, so I will create fine young musicians." In addition to his classes in Paris and Les Baux in the 1930s he had given private lessons to Igor Markevitch; later private students included André Previn, Seiji Ozawa, José Serebrier and Robert Shaw. Previn called him "the kindest, wisest man I can remember, and there was nothing about conducting he didn't know." After a performance conducted by Previn, Monteux said to him, "Did you think the orchestra was playing well? ... So did I. Next time don't interfere with them." Previn said that he never forgot this advice. Monteux's best-known undertaking as a teacher was the Pierre Monteux School for conductors and orchestral musicians, held each summer at his home in Hancock, Maine from 1943 onwards. Internationally known alumni of the school include Leon Fleisher, Erich Kunzel, Lorin Maazel, Neville Marriner, Hugh Wolff and David Zinman. (Note: The school's website also lists as "distinguished alumni" from Monteux's time and later: Thomas Baldner, Anshel Brusilow, Michael Charry, John Covelli, Marc David, Neal Gittleman, Adrian Gnam, David Hayes, Sara Jobin, Anthony LaGruth, Michael Luxner, Ludovic Morlot, Xavier Rist, John Morris Russell, Werner Torkanowsky, Jean-Philippe Tremblay, Barbara Yahr and Christopher Zimmerman.) Other Monteux students included John Canarina, whose 2003 biography was the first full-length study of the conductor in English, Charles Bruck, one of Monteux's first pupils in Paris, who became music director of the school in Hancock after Monteux's death, and Emanuel Leplin.

Monteux appeared as guest conductor with many orchestras; he commented in 1955, "I regret they don't have symphony orchestras all over the world so I could see Burma and Samarkand". His successor with the Boston Symphony Orchestra, Serge Koussevitzky, invited many guest conductors during his twenty-five years in charge; Monteux was never among them, probably, in Canarina's view, because of Koussevitzky's jealousy. In 1949 Koussevitzky was succeeded by Charles Munch, whose early career had been boosted by an invitation from Monteux to conduct the Orchestre Symphonique de Paris in 1933. Munch invited Monteux to Boston as a guest conductor in the 1951 season. The engagement was greeted with enthusiasm by the critics and the public, and Munch invited Monteux to join him the following year in heading the orchestra's first European tour. The high point of the tour was a performance under Monteux of The Rite of Spring at the Théâtre des Champs-Elysées, in the presence of the composer. Monteux returned annually to Boston every year until his death.

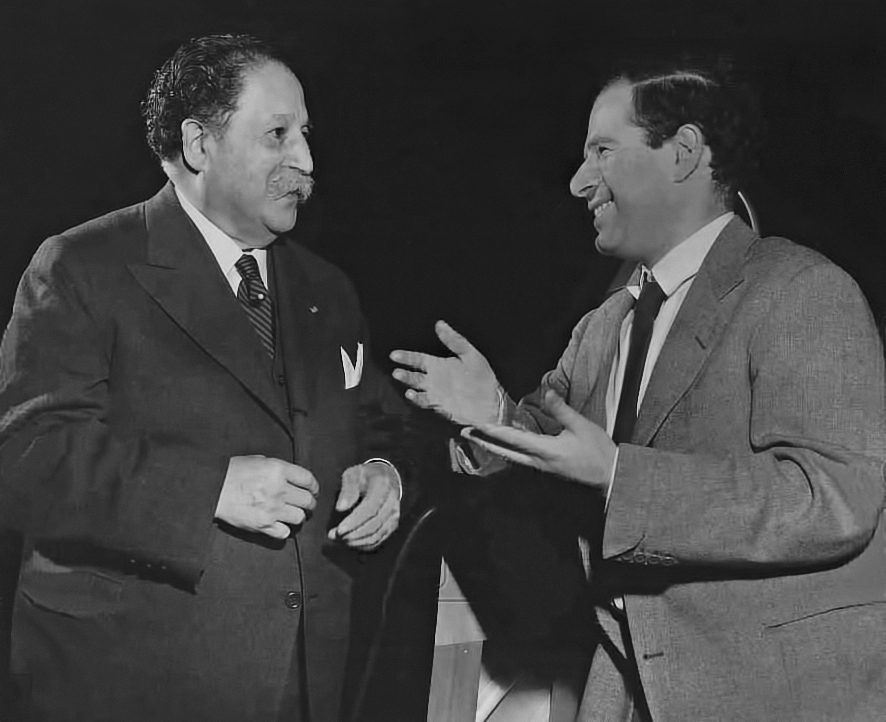
Monteux with the director Peter Brook at the Metropolitan Opera in 1953

For some time Monteux had felt that he should leave the SFSO. He had two main reasons: he believed that a conductor should not remain in one post for too long, and he wished to be free to accept more invitations to appear with other orchestras. He resigned from the SFSO at the end of the 1952 season. He briefly reappeared on the podium at the War Memorial Opera House within a year, as co-conductor of the Boston Symphony Orchestra's coast-to-coast American tour, at Munch's invitation. Almost all the members of the SFSO were in the audience, and joined in the ovation given to their former chief.

After an absence of thirty-four years, Monteux was invited to conduct at the Metropolitan Opera in New York in 1953. The opera chosen was Faust, which he had conducted at his debut at the house in 1917. The production had what Canarina calls "a stellar cast" headed by Jussi Björling, Victoria de los Ángeles, Nicola Rossi-Lemeni and Robert Merrill, but the critics, including Virgil Thomson and Irving Kolodin, reserved their highest praise for Monteux's conducting. Between 1953 and 1956 Monteux returned to the Met for Pelléas et Mélisande, Carmen, Manon, Orfeo ed Euridice, The Tales of Hoffmann and Samson et Dalila. The Met at that time typecast conductors according to their nationality, (Note: Kolodin notes that this policy did not extend to singers: no French singers were cast in Monteux's Faust, despite which "Monteux made the orchestra speak French in a way that evoked much of the special sound in the score".) and, as a Frenchman, Monteux was not offered any Italian operas. When his request to be engaged for La traviata in the 1956–57 season was refused he severed his ties with the house.

=== London ===
Since his first visit to London with the Ballets Russes in 1911, Monteux had had a "love affair with London and with British musicians". He had conducted for the fledgling BBC in an orchestral concert at Covent Garden in 1924, where he conducted the first public performance of the BBC Wireless Orchestra, and for the Royal Philharmonic Society at the Queen's Hall in the 1920s and 1930s. In 1932 he was one of four conductors who took charge of the Hallé Orchestra in Manchester in the absence of its principal conductor; the other three substitutes were Sir Edward Elgar, Beecham and the young Barbirolli. The Hallé players were immensely impressed with Monteux, and said that his orchestral technique and knowledge easily beat those of most other conductors. In 1951 he conducted the BBC Symphony Orchestra in a concert of Mozart, Beethoven and Bartók in the new Royal Festival Hall, and made further appearances with London orchestras during the rest of the 1950s. He would have made more but for Britain's strict quarantine laws, which prevented the Monteuxs from bringing their pet French poodle with them; Doris Monteux would not travel without the poodle, and Monteux would not travel without his wife.

In Paris I used to think that any concert I conducted was a failure if it did not create a scandal; in Britain and America audiences are much more polite.

— Pierre Monteux

In June 1958 Monteux conducted the London Symphony Orchestra (LSO) in three concerts, described by the orchestra's historian Richard Morrison as "a sensation with players, press and public alike." The first concert included Elgar's Enigma Variations, in which Cardus judged Monteux to be more faithful to Elgar's conception than English conductors generally were. Cardus added, "After the performance of the 'Enigma' Variations, the large audience cheered and clapped Monteux for several minutes. This applause, moreover, broke out just before the interval. English audiences are not as a rule inclined to waste time applauding at or during an interval: they usually have other things to do." Monteux considered British concertgoers "the most attentive in the world", and British music critics "the most intelligent". However, a disadvantage of conducting a London orchestra was having to perform at the Festival Hall, of which he shared with Beecham and other conductors an intense dislike: "from the conductor's rostrum it is impossible to hear the violins".

Monteux's later London performances were not only with the LSO. In 1960 he conducted Beecham's Royal Philharmonic Orchestra performing "feats of wizardry" in works by Beethoven, Debussy and Hindemith. The LSO offered him the post of principal conductor in 1961, when he was eighty-six; he accepted, on condition that he had a contract for twenty-five years, with an option of renewal. His large and varied repertoire was displayed in his LSO concerts. In addition to the French repertoire with which, to his occasional irritation, he was generally associated, he programmed Mozart, Beethoven, Brahms and Wagner, as well as later composers including Granados, Schoenberg, Scriabin, Shostakovich, Sibelius, Richard Strauss and Vaughan Williams. With the LSO, Monteux gave a fiftieth anniversary performance of The Rite of Spring at the Royal Albert Hall in the presence of the composer. Although the recording of the occasion reveals some lapses of ensemble and slack rhythms, it was an intense and emotional concert, and Monteux climbed up to Stravinsky's box to embrace him at the end. (Note: According to Stravinsky's friend Isaiah Berlin, the composer was initially reluctant to attend this event, and made other arrangements for the evening. He was finally persuaded that he should go; different accounts report his arrival in the middle or towards the end of the performance.) Players believed that in his few years in charge he transformed the LSO; Neville Marriner felt that he "made them feel like an international orchestra ... He gave them extended horizons and some of his achievements with the orchestra, both at home and abroad, gave them quite a different constitution."

=== Last years ===
Although Monteux retained his vitality to the end of his life, in his last years he suffered occasional collapses. In 1962 he fainted during a performance of Beethoven's Fifth Symphony. In 1963 he collapsed again after being presented with the Gold Medal of the Royal Philharmonic Society, Britain's highest musical honour. The presentation was made by Sir Adrian Boult, who recalled that as they left the platform, "Monteux gave two little groans as we walked down the passage, and I suddenly found my arms full of violins and bows. The orchestra had recognized the signs. Their beloved chief was fainting." Monteux suffered another collapse the following year, and David Zinman and Lorin Maazel deputised for him at the Festival Hall.

In April 1964 Monteux conducted his last concert, which was in Milan with the orchestra of Radiotelevisione italiana. The programme consisted of the overture to The Flying Dutchman, Brahms's Double Concerto and Berlioz's Symphonie fantastique. Unrealised plans included his debut at The Proms, and his 90th birthday concert, at which he intended to announce his retirement. (Note: The two scheduled Prom concerts were conducted as a tribute to Monteux by Rudolf Kempe. The planned 90th birthday concert became a memorial concert conducted by Monteux's successor as chief conductor of the LSO, István Kertész. It comprised Bach's Third Brandenburg Concerto, Brahms's Violin Concerto with Isaac Stern, and Beethoven's Seventh Symphony.) In June 1964 Monteux suffered three strokes and a cerebral thrombosis at his home in Maine, where he died on 1 July at the age of 89.

== Personal life ==
Monteux had six children, two of them adopted. From his first marriage there were a son, Jean-Paul, and a daughter, Suzanne. Jean-Paul became a jazz musician, performing with artists such as Josephine Baker and Mistinguett. His second marriage produced a daughter, Denise, later known as a sculptress, and a son, Claude, a flautist. After Monteux married Doris Hodgkins he legally adopted her two children, Donald, later a restaurateur, and Nancie, who after a career as a dancer became administrator of the Pierre Monteux School in Hancock.

Among Monteux's numerous honours, he was a Commandeur of the Légion d'honneur and a Knight of the Order of Oranje-Nassau. A political and social moderate, in the politics of his adopted homeland he supported the Democratic Party and was a strong opponent of racial discrimination. He ignored taboos on employing black artists; reportedly, during the days of segregation in the US, when told he could not be served in a restaurant "for colored folk" he insisted that he was coloured – pink.

== Music making ==
=== Reputation and repertoire ===
The record producer John Culshaw described Monteux as "that rarest of beings – a conductor who was loved by his orchestras ... to call him a legend would be to understate the case." Toscanini observed that Monteux had the best baton technique he had ever seen. Like Toscanini, Monteux insisted on the traditional orchestral layout with first and second violins to the conductor's left and right, believing that this gave a better representation of string detail than grouping all the violins together on the left. (Note: Monteux's view on the layout of first and second violins was shared by, among others, Klemperer and Boult; the latter wrote, "I am in a small minority. However, on my side are (Bruno) Walter, Monteux, Klemperer and a few others, including Toscanini ...") On fidelity to composers' scores, Monteux's biographer John Canarina ranks him with Klemperer and above even Toscanini, whose reputation for strict adherence to the score was, in Canarina's view, less justified than Monteux's.

Our principal work is to keep the orchestra together and carry out the composer's instructions, not to be sartorial models, cause dowagers to swoon, or distract audiences by our "interpretation".

— Pierre Monteux

According to the biographical sketch in Grove Dictionary of Music and Musicians, Monteux "was never an ostentatious conductor ... [he prepared] his orchestra in often arduous rehearsals and then [used] small but decisive gestures to obtain playing of fine texture, careful detail and powerful rhythmic energy, retaining to the last his extraordinary grasp of musical structure and a faultless ear for sound quality." Monteux was extremely economical with words and gestures and expected a response from his smallest movement. The record producer Erik Smith recalled of Monteux's rehearsals with the Vienna Philharmonic for Beethoven's Pastoral Symphony and Brahms's Second, "although he could not speak to the orchestra in German, he transformed their playing from one take to the next".

The importance of rehearsal to Monteux was shown when, in 1923, Diaghilev asked him to conduct Stravinsky's new Les noces with no rehearsal, as the composer would already have conducted the first performance, Monteux following on from there. Monteux told the impresario "Stravinsky, 'e can do what 'e like, but I have to do what ze composer 'as written." Monteux's self-effacing approach to scores led to occasional adverse comment; the music critic of The Nation, B. H. Haggin, while admitting that Monteux was generally regarded as one of the giants of conducting, wrote of his "repeatedly demonstrated musical mediocrity". Other American writers have taken a different view. In 1957 Carleton Smith wrote, "His approach to all music is that of the master-craftsman. ... Seeing him at work, modest and quiet, it is difficult to realize that he is a bigger box office attraction at the Metropolitan Opera House than any prima donna ... that he is the only conductor regularly invited to take charge of America's 'big three' – the Boston, Philadelphia and New York Philharmonic orchestras." In his 1967 book The Great Conductors, Harold C. Schonberg wrote of Monteux, "[A] conductor of international stature, a conductor admired and loved all over the world. The word 'loved' is used advisedly." Elsewhere, Schonberg wrote of Monteux's "passion and charisma". When asked in a radio interview to describe himself (as a conductor) in one word, Monteux replied, "Damned professional".

External audio
- You may hear Pierre Monteux conducting Johannes Brahms's Alto Rhapsody with the contralto Marian Anderson the San Francisco Symphony Orchestra and Chorus in 1945 Here on archive.org

Throughout his career Monteux suffered from being thought of as a specialist in French music. The music that meant most to him was that of German composers, particularly Brahms, but this was often overlooked by concert promoters and recording companies. Of the four Brahms symphonies, he was invited by the recording companies to record only one, the Second. Recordings of his live performances of the First and Third have been released on CD, but the discography in Canarina's biography lists no recording, live or from the studio, of the Fourth. The critic William Mann, along with many others, regarded him as a "supremely authoritative" conductor of Brahms, though Cardus disagreed: "In German music Monteux, naturally enough, missed harmonic weight and the right heavily lunged tempo. His rhythm, for example, was a little too pointed for, say, Brahms or Schumann." Gramophone's reviewer Jonathan Swain contends that no conductor knew more than Monteux about expressive possibilities in the strings, claiming that "the conductor who doesn't play a stringed instrument simply doesn't know how to get the different sounds; and the bow has such importance in string playing that there are maybe 50 different ways of producing the same note"; In his 2003 biography, John Canarina lists nineteen "significant world premieres" conducted by Monteux. In addition to Petrushka and The Rite of Spring is a further Stravinsky work, The Nightingale. Monteux's other premieres for Diaghilev included Ravel's Daphnis et Chloé and Debussy's Jeux. In the concert hall he premiered works by, among others, Milhaud, Poulenc and Prokofiev. (Note: The works listed by Canarina are: Stravinsky, Petrushka, Ballets Russes, Paris, 13 June 1911; Ravel, Daphnis et Chloé, Ballets Russes, Paris, 8 June 1912; Debussy, Jeux, Ballets Russes, Paris, 15 May 1913; Stravinsky, The Rite of Spring, Ballets Russes, Paris, 29 May 1913; Florent Schmitt, La Tragédie de Salomé, Paris, 12 June 1913; Stravinsky, The Nightingale, Paris, 26 May 1914; Charles Griffes, The Pleasure-Dome of Kubla Khan, Boston, 28 November 1919; Ravel, Tzigane, (Samuel Dushkin, soloist), Amsterdam, 19 October 1924; Willem Pijper, Symphony No 3, Amsterdam, 28 October 1926; Bliss, Hymn to Apollo, Amsterdam, 28 November 1926; Poulenc, Concert champêtre, (Wanda Landowska, soloist), Paris, 3 May 1929; Prokofiev Symphony No 3, Paris, 17 May 1929; Milhaud, Viola Concerto (Paul Hindemith, soloist) Amsterdam, 15 December 1929; Gian Francesco Malipiero, Violin Concerto, (Viola Mitchell, soloist), Amsterdam, 5 March 1933; Bloch, Evocations, San Francisco, 11 February 1938; Roger Sessions, Symphony No 2, San Francisco, 9 January 1947; George Antheil, Symphony No 6, San Francisco, 10 February 1949.) In a letter of April 1914 Stravinsky wrote "everyone can appreciate your zeal and your probity in regard to the contemporary works of various tendencies that you have had occasion to defend."

Monteux's biographer Jean-Philippe Mousnier analysed a representative sample of Monteux's programmes for more than 300 concerts. The symphonies played most frequently were César Franck's D minor Symphony, the Symphonie fantastique, Beethoven's Seventh, Tchaikovsky's Fifth and Sixth, and the first two symphonies of Brahms. Works by Richard Strauss featured almost as often as those of Debussy, and Wagner's Prelude and "Liebestod" from Tristan und Isolde as often as The Rite of Spring.

=== Recordings ===
You may give an excellently played, genuinely felt performance of a movement, but because the engineer is not satisfied because there is some rustling at one point, so you do it again and this time something else goes wrong. By the time you get a "perfect" take of the recording the players are bored, the conductor is bored, and the performance is lifeless and boring. ... I detest all my own records.

— Monteux expressing his dislike of studio recording sessions, The Times, March 1959.

Monteux made a large number of recordings throughout his career. His first recording was as a violist in "Plus blanche que la blanche hermine" from Les Huguenots by Meyerbeer in 1903 for Pathé with the tenor Albert Vaguet. It is possible that Monteux played in the Colonne Orchestra's 20 early cylinders recorded around 1906–07. His recording debut as a conductor was the first of his five recordings of The Rite of Spring, issued in 1929, with the OSP, judged by Canarina to be indifferently played; recordings by Monteux of music by Ravel and Berlioz made in 1930 and 1931, Canarina believes, were more impressive. Stravinsky, who also recorded The Rite in 1929, was furious that Monteux had made a rival recording; he made vitriolic comments privately, and for some time his relations with Monteux remained cool.

Monteux's final studio recordings were with the London Symphony Orchestra in works by Ravel at the end of February 1964. In the course of his career he recorded works by more than fifty composers. In Monteux's lifetime it was rare for record companies to issue recordings of live concerts, although he would much have preferred it, he said, "if one could record in one take in normal concert-hall conditions". Some live performances of Monteux conducting the Metropolitan Opera, and among others the San Francisco Symphony, Boston Symphony, BBC Symphony and London Symphony orchestras survive alongside his studio recordings, and some have been issued on compact disc. It has been argued that these reveal even more than his studio recordings "a conductor at once passionate, disciplined, and tasteful; one who was sometimes more vibrant than the Monteux captured in the studio, and yet, like that studio conductor, a cultivated musician possessing an extraordinary ear for balance, a keen sense of style and a sure grasp of shape and line."

Many of Monteux's recordings have remained in the catalogues for decades, notably his RCA Victor recordings with the Boston Symphony and Chicago Symphony orchestras; Decca recordings with the Vienna Philharmonic; and Decca and Philips recordings with the LSO. Of Manon, one of his few opera recordings, Alan Blyth in Opera on Record states "Monteux had the music in his blood and here dispenses it with authority and spirit". (Note: The Naxos CD reissue included Monteux's spoken recollection of Massenet during rehearsals for a major Opéra-Comique revival, correcting the orchestra and singers.) He can be heard rehearsing in the original LP issues of Beethoven's Eroica Symphony with the Concertgebouw Orchestra (Philips 835132 AY) and Beethoven's 9th with the London Symphony (Westminster, WST 234).

Video recordings of Monteux are scarcer. He is seen conducting Berlioz's Roman Carnival Overture and Beethoven's 8th symphony with the Chicago Symphony Orchestra, and Dukas' L'Apprenti sorcier with the London Symphony Orchestra in an "unshowy, deeply satisfying humane way".

== Notes and references ==
Notes

== Sources ==
- Blyth, Alan (1979). Opera on Record. London: Hutchinson. ISBN 978-0-09-139980-1.
- Boult, Adrian (1973). My Own Trumpet. London: Hamish Hamilton. ISBN 978-0-241-02445-4.
- Boult, Adrian (1983). Boult on Music. London: Toccata Press. ISBN 978-0-907689-03-4.
- Buckle, Richard (1975). Nijinsky. Harmodsworth (UK): Penguin Books. ISBN 978-0-14-003782-1.
- Canarina, John (2003). Pierre Monteux, Maître. Pompton Plains, New Jersey: Amadeus Press. ISBN 978-1-57467-082-0.
- Culshaw, John (1981). Putting the Record Straight. London: Secker & Warburg. ISBN 978-0-436-11802-9.
- Haggin, B H (1974). 35 Years of Music. New York: Horizon Press. ISBN 978-0-8180-1213-6.
- Hill, Peter (2004). Stravinsky: The Rite of Spring. Cambridge: Cambridge University Press. ISBN 978-0-521-62714-6.
- Holoman, D Kern (2012). Charles Munch. New York: Oxford University Press. ISBN 978-0-19-977270-4.
- Jacobs, Arthur (1994). Henry J. Wood: Maker of the Proms. London: Methuen. ISBN 978-0-413-69340-2.
- Kolodin, Irving (1966). The Metropolitan Opera, 1883–1966 – A Candid History. New York: A.A. Knopf. OCLC 265241848.
- Monteux, Doris G (1965). It's All in the Music: The Life and Work of Pierre Monteux. New York: Farrar, Straus and Giroux. OCLC 604146.
- Monteux, Fifi (1962). Everyone is Someone. New York: Farrar, Straus & Cudahy. OCLC 602036672.
- Morrison, Richard (2004). Orchestra. London: Faber and Faber. ISBN 978-0-571-21584-3.
- Mousnier, Jean-Philippe (1999). Pierre Monteux (in French). Paris: l'Harmattan. ISBN 978-2-7384-8404-8.
- Nichols, Roger (1992). Debussy Remembered. London: Faber. ISBN 978-0-571-15357-2.
- Nichols, Roger (2002). The Harlequin Years – Music in Paris, 1917–1929. London: Thames and Hudson. ISBN 978-0-500-51095-7.
- Nijinska, Bronislava; Nijinska, Irina, eds. (1982). Early Memoirs. Translated by Jean Rawlinson. London: Faber. ISBN 978-0-571-11892-2.
- Pitou, Spire (1983). The Paris Opéra: An Encyclopedia of Operas, Ballets, Composers, and Performers – Rococo and Romantic, 1715–1815. Westport, Conn and London: Greenwood Press. OCLC 502171010.
- Previn, André; Michael Foss; Richard Adeney (1979). Orchestra. London: Macdonald and Jane's. ISBN 978-0-354-04420-2.
- Ravel, Maurice; Arbie Orenstein (1990). A Ravel Reader: Correspondence, Articles, Interviews. New York: Columbia University Press. ISBN 978-0-231-04962-7.
- Reid, Charles (1961). Thomas Beecham – An Independent Biography. London: Victor Gollancz. OCLC 500565141.
- Reid, Charles (1968). Malcolm Sargent. London: Hamish Hamilton. OCLC 603636443.
- Scheijen, Sjeng (2009). Diaghilev – A Life. Oxford: Oxford University Press. ISBN 978-0-19-975149-5.
- Schneider, David (1983). The San Francisco Symphony – Music, Maestros, and Musicians. Novato, California: Presidio Press. ISBN 089141181X.
- Schonberg, Harold C. (1967). The Great Conductors. New York: Simon and Schuster. ISBN 978-0-671-20735-9.
- Schonberg, Harold C. (1981). Facing the Music. New York: Summit Books. ISBN 978-0-671-25406-3.
- Shore, Bernard (1938). The Orchestra Speaks. London: Longmans. OCLC 499119110.
- Smith, Carleton (1957). "Pierre Monteux". In Milein Cosman (ed.). Musical Sketchbook. Oxford: Bruno Cassirer. OCLC 3225493.
- Smith, Erik (2005). "Pierre Monteux". Mostly Mozart – Articles, memoirs, rarities and surprises. Winchester: Porcellini Publications. ISBN 978-0-9544259-1-3.
- Stravinsky, Igor; Robert Craft (1986). Selected Correspondence, Vol II. London and Boston: Faber. OCLC 59162701.
