= Arthur Rubinstein – The Love of Life =

- Directed by: Gérard Patris; François Reichenbach
- Produced by: Bernard Chevry
- Distributed by: New Yorker Films (US)
- Release date: June 17, 1969
- Running time: 89 minutes
- Country: France
- Language: French

Arthur Rubinstein – The Love of Life (French: L'Amour de la vie – Arthur Rubinstein) is a 1969 documentary about the Polish-American pianist Arthur Rubinstein.

The film won the 1969 Academy Award for Best Documentary Feature. It was also screened at the 1969 Cannes Film Festival, but outside the main competition.
