= Triumph Books =

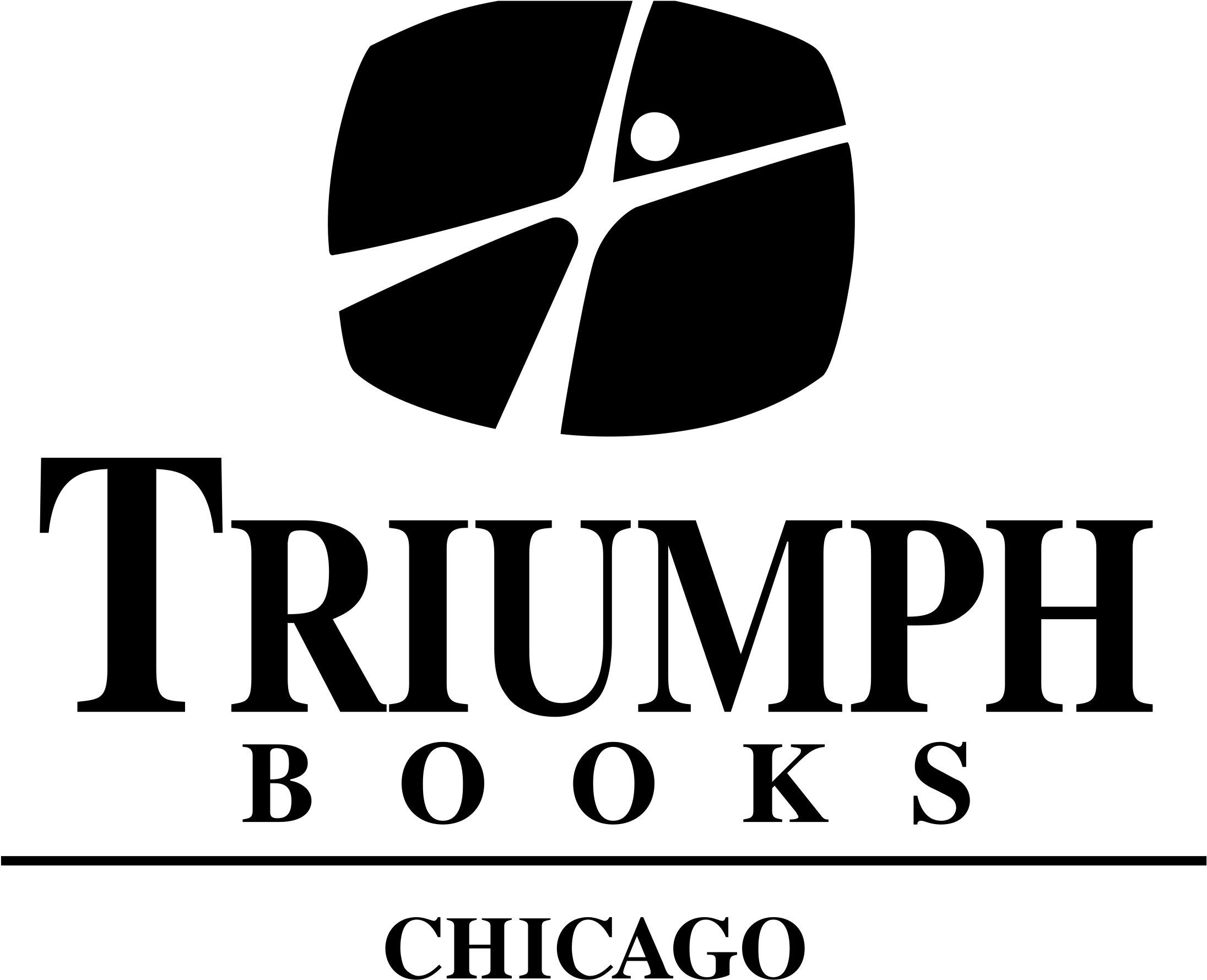
- Founded: 1989
- Founder: Mitch Rogatz
- Country of origin: United States
- Headquarters location: Chicago, Illinois
- Distribution: Independent Publishers Group
- Publication types: Books
- Nonfiction topics: Sports
- Official website: www.triumphbooks.com

Triumph Books is a Chicago-based sports book publisher. The company is well known for its "instant books", such as its illustrated tribute to NASCAR driver Dale Earnhardt, which was released 10 days after his death in a crash in the 2001 Daytona 500.

Mitch Rogatz is the founder and publisher of Triumph. After founding the company in 1989, he sold it to Random House in 2006, only to buy it back five years later.

The company releases 80–90 titles each year, of which 5–10 percent are instant books.
