= National Arts Foundation =

The National Arts Foundation, Incorporated, was a private American New York not-for-profit corporation devoted to promoting fine arts. Robert Carleton Smith (1908–1984) founded the organization in 1947, served as its president and later as Chairman of its Advisory Committee.

== People ==
- Vaughan Williams – voted The National Arts Foundation of America's "outstanding musician of 1953"
