= Luli Oswald =

Brazilian pianist and piano teacher

Luli Oswald (* 1927 in Rio de Janeiro; † 2 January 2005 ibid) was a Brazilian pianist and piano teacher.

== Life ==
=== Origin and Family ===
Luli Oswald is the illegitimate daughter of the pianist Arthur Rubinstein and the Italian Marquess Paola Medici del Vascello (born Princess Paola di Viggiano; also: Donna Paola Sanfelice dei Principi di Viggiano). Oswald was never recognised by her biological parents, hidden from public view and given as a newborn to a friend of Rubinstein's, the Brazilian conductor and composer Henrique Oswald. The latter's daughter Maria and her husband Odoardo Marchesini raised her and adopted her. The adoptive parents signed an affidavit in 1967 stating that Luli Oswald had been entrusted to them by her biological parents Paola Medici and Arthur Rubinstein because she was the "fruit of a forbidden love". After the adoption, her name was Margarida Henriqueta Marchesini. She later performed under the stage name Luli Oswald.

Oswald married the Brazilian entrepreneur Eurico Teixeira de Freitas and gave birth to seven children. The marriage was later divorced. She adopted the stage name Luli de Freitas after the assassination of US President John F. Kennedy, as the name "Oswald" became unpopular because of Lee Harvey Oswald, who was accused of Kennedy's murder. However, she later reappeared under her stage name Luli Oswald again.

=== Career ===
Oswald studied piano with Tomás Terán and Magda Tagliaferro in Brazil, with Isidore Philipp in Paris, with Rosina Lhévinne in New York and with her father Arthur Rubinstein. She also completed studies in England, Hungary and Poland.

As a pianist, she performed in public from 1960, and her international career began in the United States in 1962. She performed with orchestras in Brazil, Argentina, Mexico, the USA, Italy, Portugal, the Netherlands, Hungary, Germany, Japan and the Canary Islands. She has also performed with other pianists, including Nelson Freire and André Carrara. With Freire and Carrara, for example, she interpreted Mozart's 7th Piano Concerto in F major, K. 242 (Concerto for Three Pianos) in Brazil in 1991. In the same year, she performed Poulenc's Concerto in D minor for two pianos with the Spanish pianist Jesús A. Rodriquez on Tenerife.

She retired from concert life between 1972 and 1986.

Oswald also worked as a piano teacher, both in her home country and abroad, e.g. in Germany and Japan. She was a jury member several times at international piano competitions in Brazil and Japan.

== Trivia ==
Oswald came to public attention with the report of an alien abduction that allegedly occurred on the night of 15-16 October 1979. She had accompanied her student friend on a car trip from Rio de Janeiro to Saquarema. On the way there, they saw luminous flying objects coming from the sea. They also saw them on the way back near Porta Negra, where their car also reacted with "strange effects". Afterwards, they had stopped for a coffee and realised that they had no more time for about 2 hours. Under hypnosis, Oswald recalled being abducted into a spaceship occupied by rat-like aliens. One of these beings had said they were from Antarctica. There was a tunnel under the South Pole.

== Literature ==
- Interview with Luli Oswald In the appendix of the master thesis of Lucia Cervini Interpretação em Henrique Oswald: transformações entre o Allegro Agitato da sonata op. 21 e a Sonata-Fantasia op. 44 para violoncelo e piano (Interpretation at Henrique Oswald: transformations between the Allegro Agitato of the sonata op. 21 and the Sonata-Fantasia op. 44 for cello and piano), Universidade Estadual de Campinas, Instituto de Artes, 2001. Pages 145 ff. Retrieved 2022-03-05.

== Discography ==
- Berceuse of Gilda Guinle. On: Recordando Carlinhos Guinle (Philips 632.116 L; 1962)
