= Polish Assistance =

American charitable foundation

Polish Assistance, also known as "Bratnia Pomoc" ("Brotherly Help"), is a charitable foundation based in New York City. It was created to provide financial aid to Polish immigrants, especially the elderly.

== History ==
Polish Assistance (Bratnia Pomoc), founded in 1956, grants financial aid to Polish immigrants, especially the elderly.

In its early stages the group sought to raise funds for Polish immigrants who arrived in the U.S. after World War II (WWII) in order to escape communism. Most of those who were helped were ex-military, former government officials, educators, writers and artists who found it difficult to adapt to their new circumstances in a foreign country.

The nascent organization immediately began to raise funds under the leadership of its founders, Mr. and Mrs. Jan Dembinski. Initially the activity of Polish Assistance consisted of small grants and loans to individuals in need. Eventually, three boarding houses were purchased between 1973 and 1975 in Ocean Grove, New Jersey to accommodate up to two dozen people.. The houses were liquidated between 1992 and 1998. After the fall of communism in Poland in 1989, another property was purchased near Warsaw, Poland to accommodate those elderly who wanted to return to Poland. Eventually, the property was donated to a Polish foundation for the blind.

== Mission statement ==
"To provide financial assistance to needy persons of Polish origin; to assist such needy persons in adapting themselves to new economic and social conditions, and to help them to become better integrated in community life; to lend assistance to them in case of illness and distress and voluntarily to help them in any other possible way in case of need; to provide an information center to aid in the fulfillment of the foregoing purposes."

== Present activity ==
Presently, Polish Assistance is focused on assisting needy Polish immigrants in the New York metropolitan area and it is expanding its efforts in Florida as well. Direct assistance to those in need is given on a monthly basis, usually to supplement low social security payments or to cover extraordinary medical bills.

Polish Assistance is housed in a limestone neo-Renaissance three-story mansion built in 1917 which is owned and occupied by the Kosciuszko Foundation.

== Events ==
One of the main fundraising events for the Polish Assistance is the annual Bal Polonaise that is held in New York City in the Grand Ballroom at the Plaza. The evening begins with the traditional Polonaise dance performed by distinguished guests. Such distinguished guests over the years have included H.S.H. Princess Grace of Monaco, Artur Rubenstein, Helena Rubenstein, and Princess Lucie Shirazee.

Over the years locations included the ballrooms at The Pierre, St. Regis and Sheraton East. Thanks to the maestro pianist Arthur Rubinstein and his wife Nela, the first dance for the benefit of Polish Assistance took place in 1956 at the Park Avenue penthouse of Princess Gourielli, better known in the world of beauty as Helena Rubinstein.
