= Arthur Rubinstein =

Polish pianist (1887–1982)

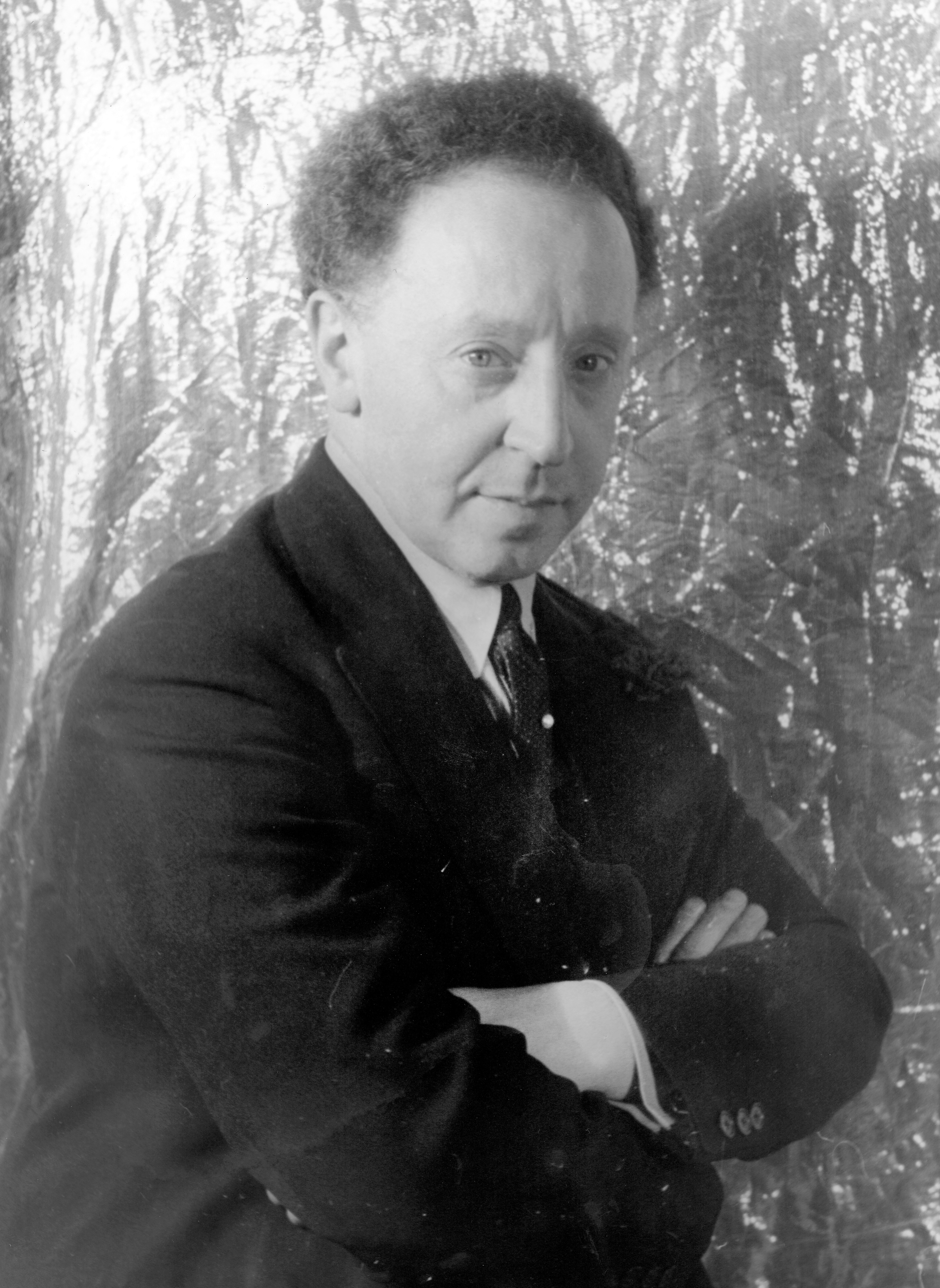
Arthur Rubinstein in 1937, by Carl Van Vechten

Arthur Rubinstein KBE OMRI (Polish: Artur Rubinstein; 28 January 1887 – 20 December 1982) was a Polish and American pianist. Widely regarded as one of the greatest pianists of his day, he received international acclaim for his interpretations of classical music compositions, particularly Chopin. Rubinstein played in public for eight decades with a vast repertoire consisting of Beethoven, Brahms, Mozart, Schubert, Liszt, Tchaikovsky, Saint-Saëns, and Schumann, amongst others.

== Early life ==
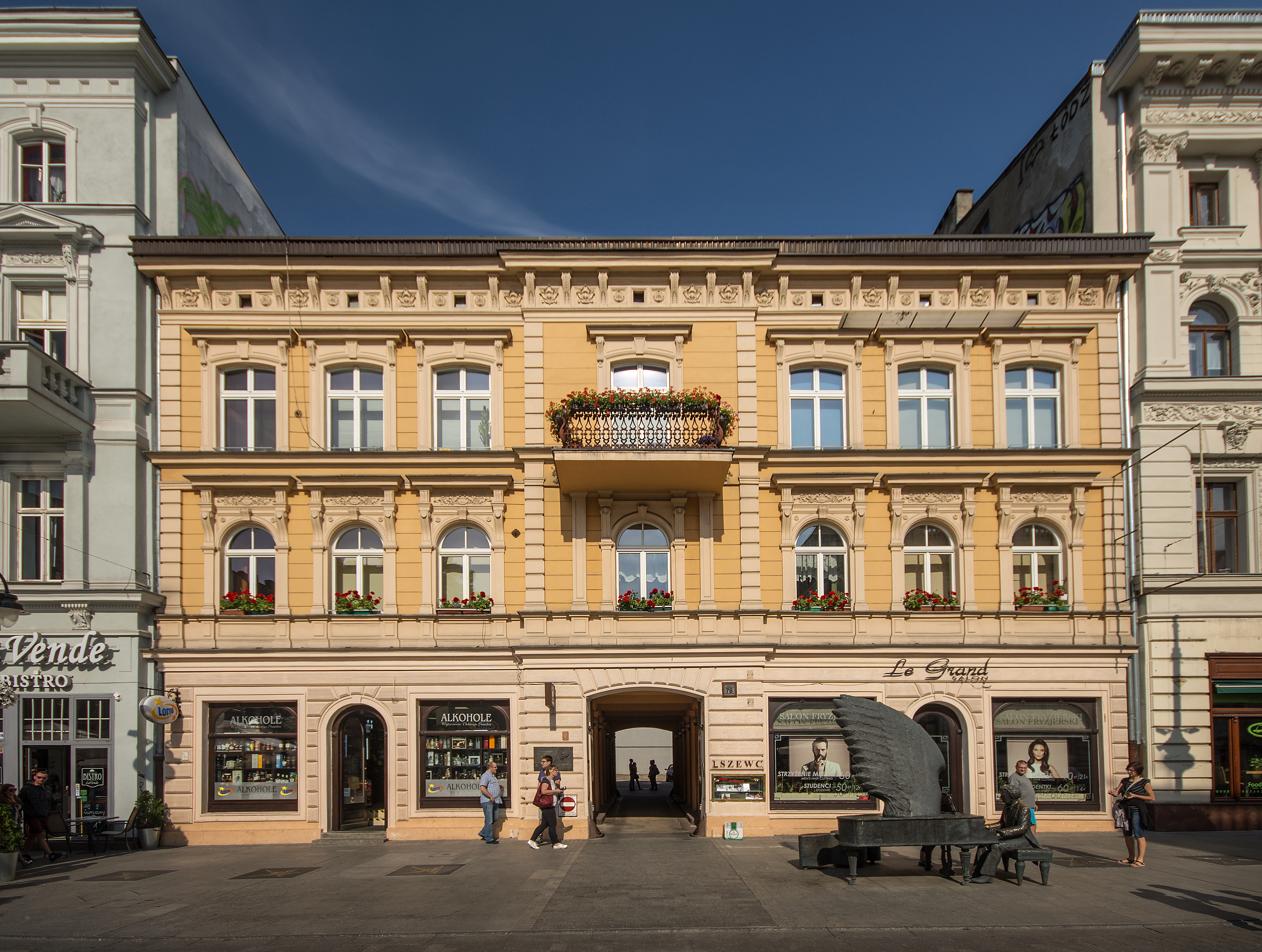
Childhood home of Artur Rubinstein at Piotrkowska Street, Łódź, Poland

Arthur Rubinstein was born in Łódź, Congress Poland (part of the Russian Empire for the entire time Rubinstein resided there) on 28 January 1887, to a Jewish family. He was the youngest of seven children of Felicja Blima Fajga (née Heiman) and Izaak Rubinstein. His father owned a small textile factory.

Rubinstein's birth name was to be Leo, but his eight-year-old brother claimed that "His name must be Artur. Since Artur X (a neighbour's son) plays the violin so nicely, the baby may also become a great musician!" Thus, he was called Artur, although in English-speaking countries, he preferred to be known as Arthur Rubinstein. His United States impresario Sol Hurok, however, insisted he be billed as Artur, and records were released in the West under both versions of his name.

At age two, Rubinstein demonstrated absolute pitch and a fascination with the piano, watching his elder sister's piano lessons. By the age of four, he was recognised as a child prodigy. His father had a predilection for the violin and offered Rubinstein a violin; but Rubinstein rejected it because he thought his instinct was for harmony and polyphony. The Hungarian violinist Joseph Joachim, on hearing the four-year-old child play the piano, was greatly impressed, telling Arthur's family, "This boy may become a very great musician—he certainly has the talent for it... When the time comes for serious study, bring him to me, and I shall be glad to supervise his artistic education." On 14 December 1894, seven-year-old Arthur Rubinstein had his debut with pieces by Mozart, Schubert and Mendelssohn.

When he turned ten, Rubinstein moved to Berlin to continue his studies, and gave his first performance with the Berlin Philharmonic in 1900, at the age of 13. Joachim entrusted Rubinstein to Karl Heinrich Barth as his piano teacher. As a student of Barth, Rubinstein inherited a renowned pedagogical lineage: Barth was himself a pupil of Liszt, who had been taught by Czerny, who had in turn been a pupil of Beethoven.

== Music and career ==
In 1904, Rubinstein moved to Paris to launch his career in earnest, where he met the composers Maurice Ravel and Paul Dukas and the violinist Jacques Thibaud. He also played Camille Saint-Saëns' Piano Concerto No. 2 in the presence of the composer. Through the family of Juliusz Wertheim, whose understanding of Chopin's genius inspired Rubinstein, he formed friendships with the violinist Paul Kochanski and composer Karol Szymanowski.

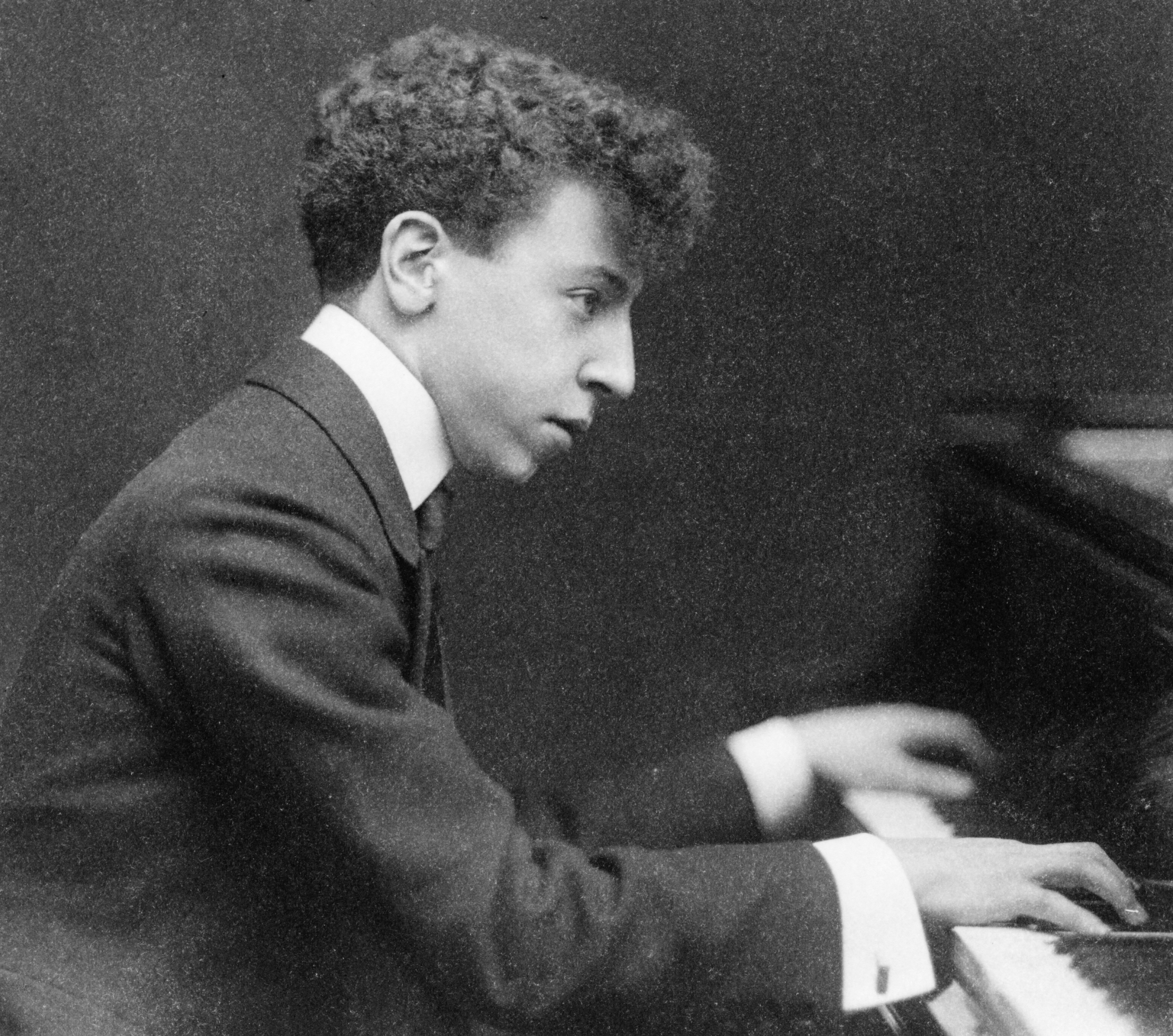
Rubinstein, age 19, in 1906

Rubinstein made his New York debut at Carnegie Hall in 1906, and thereafter toured the United States, Austria, Italy, and Russia. According to his own testimony and that of his son in François Reichenbach's film L'Amour de la vie (1969), he was not well received in the United States. By 1908, Rubinstein, destitute and desperate, hounded by creditors, and threatened with being evicted from his Berlin hotel room, made a failed attempt to hang himself. Subsequently, he said that he felt "reborn" and endowed with an unconditional love of life. In 1912, he made his London debut, and found a musical home there in the Edith Grove, Chelsea, musical salon of Paul and Muriel Draper, in company with Igor Stravinsky, Kochanski, Thibaud, Pablo Casals, Pierre Monteux and others.

During World War I, Rubinstein stayed in London, giving recitals and accompanying the violinist Eugène Ysaÿe. In 1916 and 1917, he made his first tours in Spain and South America where he was widely acclaimed. It was during those tours that he developed a lifelong enthusiasm for the music of Enrique Granados, Isaac Albéniz, Manuel de Falla, and Heitor Villa-Lobos. He was the dedicatee of Manuel de Falla's Fantasía Bética, Villa-Lobos's Rudepoêma and Stravinsky's Trois mouvements de Petrouchka.

Rubinstein was appalled by Germany's conduct during World War I, particularly the atrocities in Belgium and never played there again. His last performance in Germany was in 1914. His dislike of Germany was not improved during and after World War II when most of his family back in Poland were killed during the Holocaust. (Rubinstein has said many times to interviewers that there were two countries where he would not play: Tibet, because it is too high, and Germany, because it is too low.)

In the autumn of 1919 Rubinstein toured Great Britain with soprano Emma Calvé and tenor Vladimir Rosing.

In 1921, Rubinstein gave two American tours, travelling to New York City with Karol Szymanowski and his close friend Paul Kochanski. During his recital in Florida, Rubinstein was accompanied by violinist virtuoso Rudolph Bochco.

In 1934, the pianist, who stated he neglected his technique in his early years, relying instead on natural talent, withdrew from concert life for several months of intensive study and practice.

Rubinstein toured the United States again in 1937, his career becoming centered there during the World War II years when he lived in Brentwood, Los Angeles, California. He became a naturalized US citizen in 1946.

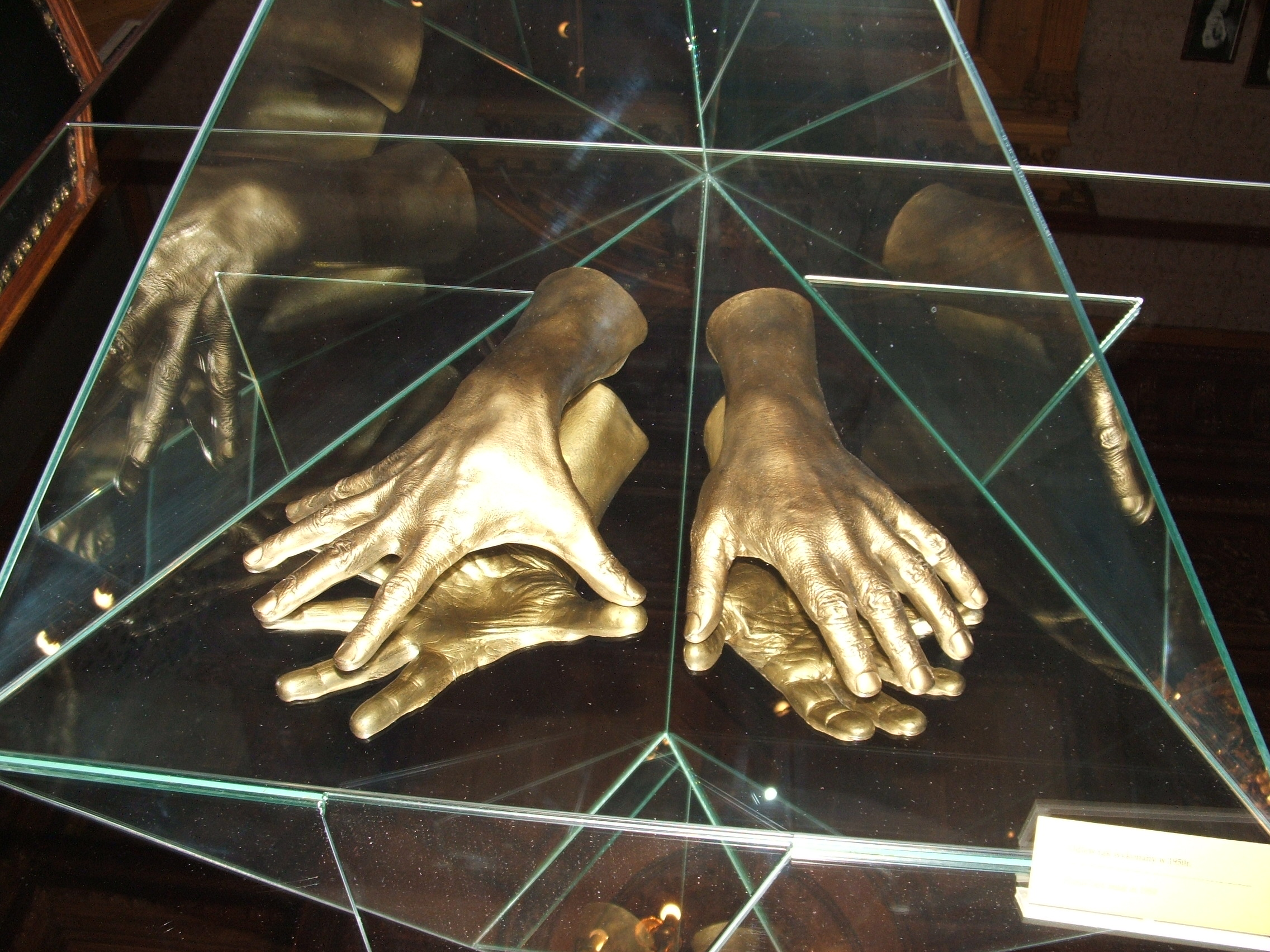
A cast of the pianist's hands, at the Łódź museum

During his time in California, Rubinstein provided the piano soundtrack for several films, including Song of Love with Katharine Hepburn. He appeared, as himself, in the films Carnegie Hall and Of Men and Music.

Although best known as a recitalist and concerto soloist, Rubinstein was considered an outstanding chamber musician, partnering with Henryk Szeryng, Jascha Heifetz, Pablo Casals, Gregor Piatigorsky and the Guarneri Quartet. Rubinstein recorded much of the core piano repertoire, particularly that of the Romantic composers. At the time of his death, The New York Times in describing him wrote, "Chopin was his specialty ... it was [as] a Chopinist that he was considered by many without peer." With the exception of the Études, he recorded most of the works of Chopin. In 1964, during the Cold War, he performed an all-Chopin recital in Moscow. He was one of the earliest champions of Spanish and South American composers, as well as French composers of the early 20th century such as Debussy and Ravel. In addition, Rubinstein promoted the music of his compatriot Karol Szymanowski. Rubinstein, in conversation with Alexander Scriabin, named Brahms as his favorite composer, a response that enraged Scriabin.

In 1969, the film Arthur Rubinstein – The Love of Life was released; it won the Academy Award for Best Documentary Feature. (A later TV special, Rubinstein at 90, highlighted how he had been playing for people for eight decades.)

By the mid-1970s, Rubinstein's eyesight had begun to deteriorate. He retired from the stage at age 89 in May 1976, giving his last concert at London's Wigmore Hall, where he had first played nearly 70 years before.

Rubinstein was fluent in eight languages. He also memorized his own repertoire and that for other instrumental genres. According to his memoirs, he learned César Franck's Symphonic Variations during the train journey to the concert he was to perform the work. He memorized the music without having a piano available, practicing passages on his lap. Rubinstein described his memory as photographic, to the extent that he would visualize an errant coffee stain while recalling a score.

Rubinstein also had exceptionally developed aural abilities, which allowed him to play whole symphonies in his mind. "At breakfast, I might pass a Brahms symphony in my head," he said. "Then I am called to the phone, and half an hour later I find it's been going on all the time and I'm in the third movement." This ability was often tested by Rubinstein's friends, who would randomly pick extracts from opera and symphonic scores and ask him to play them from memory.

Rubinstein's autobiography contained two volumes: My Young Years (1973); and My Many Years (1980). Many were displeased by their emphasis on personal anecdotes over music. Pianist Emanuel Ax, one of Rubinstein's greatest admirers, was profoundly disappointed by reading My Many Years: "Until then," he told Harvey Sachs, "I had idolized Rubinstein—I had wanted to have a life like his, the book changed all that."

Rubinstein once said:

It is simply my life, music. I live it, breathe it, talk with it. I am almost unconscious of it. No, I do not mean I take it for granted—one should never take for granted any of the gifts of God. But it is like an arm, a leg, part of me. On the other hand, books and paintings and languages and people are passions with me, always to be cultivated. Travel too. I am a lucky man to have a business which allows me to be on the road so much. On the train, the plane, I have time to read. There again, I am a lucky man to be a pianist. A splendid instrument, the piano, just the right size so that you cannot take it with you. Instead of practicing, I can read. A fortunate fellow, am I not?

== Personal life ==
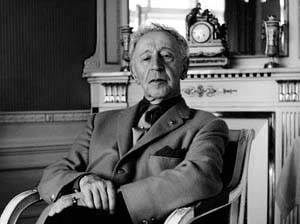
Rubinstein in 1963

=== Marriage and family ===
Of his youth, Rubinstein once said: "It is said of me that when I was young I divided my time impartially among wine, women and song. I deny this categorically. Ninety percent of my interests were women." At the age of 45, in 1932, Rubinstein married Nela Młynarska, a 24-year-old Polish ballerina (who had studied with Mary Wigman). Nela was the daughter of the Polish conductor Emil Młynarski and his wife Anna Talko-Hryncewicz, who was from a Polish aristocratic heraldic family of Iłgowski coat of arms. Nela had first fallen in love with Rubinstein when she was 18, but married Mieczysław Munz, another Polish-American pianist, after Rubinstein began an affair with an Italian princess. Nela subsequently divorced Munz and three years later married Rubinstein. They had five children (one died in infancy), including photographer Eva Rubinstein, who married William Sloane Coffin, and son John Rubinstein, a Tony Award-winning actor and father of actor Michael Weston. Nela subsequently wrote Nela's Cookbook, which included the dishes she prepared for the couple's legendary parties.

Both before and during his marriage, Rubinstein carried on a series of affairs with women, including Lesley Jowitt, the wife of the British politician William Jowitt, and Irene Curzon.

In addition to fathering a daughter (Brazilian pianist Luli Oswald) with the Italian marchioness Paola Medici del Vascello (née Princess Paola di Viggiano, also: Donna Paola Sanfelice dei Principi di Viggiano), he may have been the father of American decorator and artist Muriel Draper's son Sanders Draper, who died in World War II. Luli Oswald was never recognised by her biological parents, hidden from the public and given as a newborn to a friend of Rubinstein's, the Brazilian conductor and composer Henrique Oswald (1852-1931). The latter's daughter Maria and her husband Odoardo Marchesini raised her and adopted her. The adoptive parents signed an affidavit in 1967 stating that Luli Oswald had been entrusted to them by her biological parents Paola Medici and Arthur Rubinstein because she was the "fruit of a forbidden love." After the adoption, her name was Margarida Henriqueta Marchesini. Oswald later performed under the stage name Luli Oswald.

Though he and Nela never divorced, in 1977, at age 90, he left her for Annabelle Whitestone, then 33 years old.

=== Jewish identity ===
An agnostic, Rubinstein was proud of his Jewish heritage.

In 1949, Rubinstein, some of whose family members were killed in the Holocaust, along with other prominent musicians announced that he would boycott the Chicago Symphony Orchestra if it hired the conductor Wilhelm Furtwängler as its music director. Furtwängler had remained in Germany during the war and had conducted a symphony (Beethoven's 9th) for Hitler's birthday.

=== Support to Israel ===
He was a supporter of Israel, which he visited several times with his family. He played solo recitals, concerts with the Israel Philharmonic Orchestra, and taught master classes at the Jerusalem Music Centre.

=== Polish identity ===
External videos
- Rubinstein performing in 1964: Chopin's Polonaise in A-flat major, Op. 53, Debussy's waltz La plus que lente, L. 121 and Prelude in A-minor, Alexander Scriabin's Nocturne for the Left Hand, No. 2 of Op. 9, Heitor Villa-Lobos's O Polichinelo, de Falla's Danza Ritual del Fuego

Throughout his life, Rubinstein was deeply attached to Poland. At the inauguration of the United Nations in 1945, Rubinstein showed his Polish patriotism at a concert for the delegates. He began the concert by stating his deep disappointment that the conference did not have a delegation from Poland. Rubinstein later described becoming overwhelmed by a blind fury and angrily pointing out to the public the absence of the Polish flag. He stopped playing the piano, told the audience to stand up, including the Soviets, and played the Polish national anthem loudly and slowly, repeating the final part in a great thunderous forte. When he had finished, the public gave him a great ovation.

=== Charitable contributions ===
Rubinstein was active in supporting charities throughout his life. He performed charity concerts to raise donations for numerous organizations which interested him. In 1961, he performed ten recitals in Carnegie Hall to raise roughly $100,000 for charities including Big Brothers, United Jewish Appeal, Polish Assistance, Musicians Emergency fund, the National Association for Mental Health, and the Legal Defense Fund of the National Advancement of Colored People.

=== On practice ===
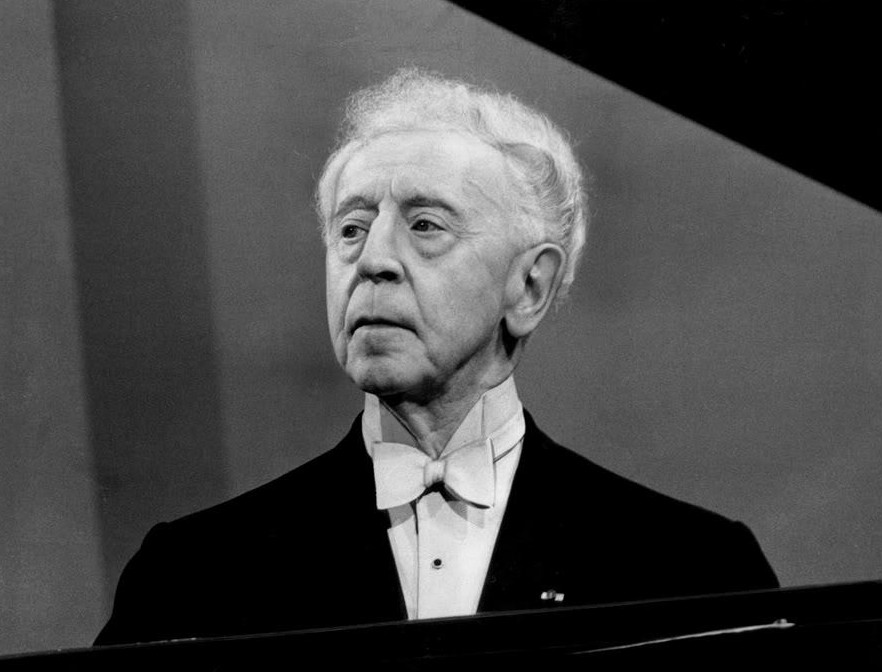
Rubinstein in 1968

In his two autobiographies, Rubinstein is often intensely self-critical. A natural pianist with a big technique, he claimed that he practiced as little as possible, learning new pieces quickly and with insufficient attention to detail, relying on his charm and charisma to conceal the lack of finish in his playing. The literal truth of these self-directed critiques is open to question: Rubinstein wasn't averse to making himself the butt of a good story. Even so, he insisted that his attitude toward practicing changed after his marriage. He stated that he did not want his children to see him as a second-rater, so he began in the summer of 1934 to restudy his entire repertoire. "I buckled down back to work—six hours, eight hours, nine hours a day." he recalled in 1958. "And a strange thing happened. ... I began to discover new meanings, new qualities, new possibilities in music that I have been regularly playing for more than 30 years." In general, however, Rubinstein believed that excessive practice could be dangerous for young pianists. Perhaps recalling his own youthful brush with repetitive-stress syndrome, Rubinstein regularly advised that young pianists should practice no more than three hours a day. "I was born very, very lazy and I don't always practice very long", he said, "but I must say, in my defense, that it is not so good, in a musical way, to overpractice. When you do, the music seems to come out of your pocket. If you play with a feeling of 'Oh, I know this', you play without that little drop of fresh blood that is necessary—and the audience feels it." Of his own practice methods, he said, "At every concert I leave a lot to the moment. I must have the unexpected, the unforeseen. I want to risk, to dare. I want to be surprised by what comes out. I want to enjoy it more than the audience. That way the music can bloom anew. It's like making love. The act is always the same, but each time it's different."

=== Pupils ===
Rubinstein was reluctant to teach in his earlier life, refusing to accept William Kapell's request for lessons. It was not until the late 1950s that he accepted his first pupil, Dubravka Tomšič Srebotnjak. Other pupils of Rubinstein include François-René Duchâble, Avi Schönfeld, Ann Schein Carlyss, Eugen Indjic, Janina Fialkowska, Dean Kramer and Marc Laforêt. Rubinstein also gave master classes towards the end of his life.

== Death and legacy ==
"I have found that if you love life, life will love you back..."

"People are always setting conditions for happiness... I love life without condition."

— Arthur Rubinstein

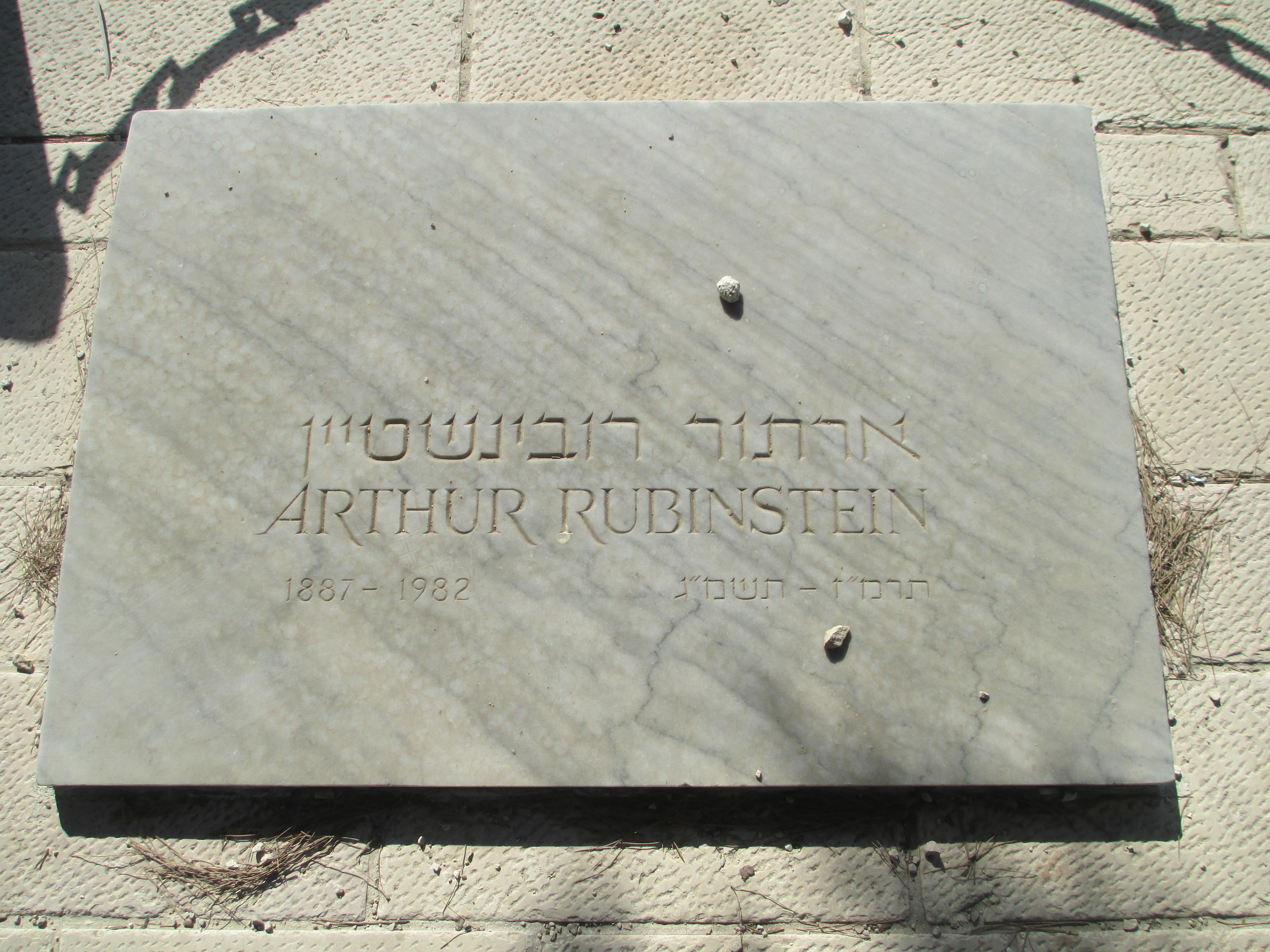
Grave of Arthur Rubinstein at Arthur Rubinstein forest near Jerusalem

Rubinstein died in his sleep at his home in Geneva, Switzerland, on 20 December 1982, at the age of 95. His remains were cremated two days later. On the first anniversary of his death, an urn holding his ashes was buried in Jerusalem—as specified in his will—in a dedicated plot now dubbed "Rubinstein Forest" overlooking the Jerusalem Forest. This was arranged by then-mayor Teddy Kollek with Israel's Chief Rabbis, who had objected to Rubinstein's wish of having his ashes strewn over the Jerusalem Forest, given that laws in Israel prohibit cremation and the forest is a public park, and as such falls under the same law governing cemeteries.

In October 2007, his family donated to the Juilliard School an extensive collection of original manuscripts, manuscript copies and published editions that had been seized by the Germans during World War II from his Paris residence. Seventy-one items were returned to his four children, marking the first time that Jewish property kept in the Berlin State Library was returned to the legal heirs.

In 1974, Jan Jacob Bistritzky established the Arthur Rubinstein International Piano Master Competition, held every three years in Israel, intended to promote the careers of young and outstanding pianists. The Arthur Rubinstein Award and other prizes are presented to the winners. The Rubinstein Competition also commissions works by Israeli composers.

There is an Arthur Rubinstein Street in Tel Aviv and in Białogard (Polish: ulica Artura Rubinsteina) and an Arthur Rubinstein Passage in Łódź (Polish: aleja Artura Rubinsteina).

== Recordings ==
External audio
- Rubinstein performing in 1947 Liszt's Piano Concerto No. 1 with Antal Doráti conducting the Dallas Symphony Orchestra

In 1910, Rubinstein recorded Franz Liszt's Hungarian Rhapsody No. 10 for the Polish Favorite label. The pianist was displeased with the acoustic recording process, saying it made the piano sound "like a banjo" and he did not record again until the advent of electrical recording. However, Rubinstein made numerous player piano music rolls for the Aeolian Duo-Art system and the American Piano Company (AMPICO) in the 1920s.

Beginning in 1928, Rubinstein began to record extensively for the His Master's Voice and for RCA Victor in the United States, making a large number of solo, concerto and chamber music recordings until his retirement in 1976. As recording technology improved, from 78-rpm discs to LPs and stereophonic recordings, Rubinstein re-recorded much of his repertoire. All of his RCA Victor recordings have been reissued on compact disc and amount to about 107 hours of music.

Rubinstein preferred to make studio recordings and during his lifetime approved for release only around three hours of live recordings. However, since his death, several labels have issued many of his live recordings sourced from various radio broadcasts.

A recording of Rubinstein's version of Chopin's Minute Waltz has served as the theme music for the BBC Radio 4 show Just a Minute since the programme's inception.

== Honours ==
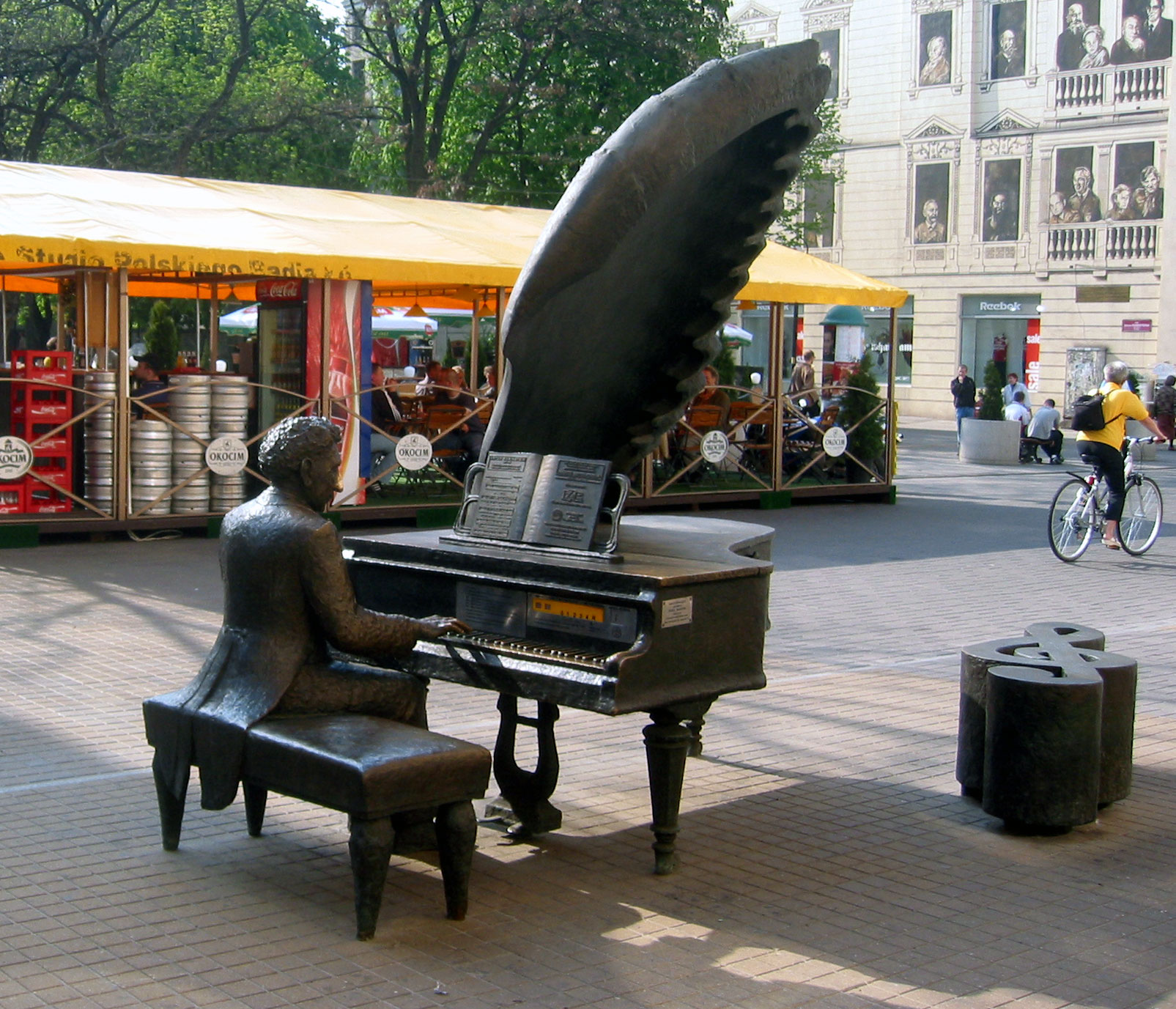
Sculpture of Arthur Rubinstein on Piotrkowska Street, in Łódź, Poland, where Rubinstein was born

- Officer of the Order of Saint James of the Sword, Portugal (31 May 1958)
- Sonning Award of Denmark (1971)
- Grand-Officer of the Order of Saint James of the Sword, Portugal (9 May 1972)
- Presidential Medal of Freedom of the US presented by President Gerald Ford (1 April 1976)
- Honorary Knight Commander of the Most Excellent Order of the British Empire (KBE) of Great Britain and Northern Ireland (1977)
- Kennedy Center Honors of the United States of America (1978)
- Grand-Officier of the National Order of the Legion of Honour of France
- Officer's Cross (Krzyż Oficerski) of the Order of Polonia Restituta of Poland
- Grand Cross of the Order of Merit of the Italian Republic of Italy
- Member of the Civil Order of Alfonso X, the Wise of Spain
- Officier of the Order of Leopold of Belgium
- Voted into Gramophone's Hall of Fame in 2012
- Grammy Award for Best Chamber Music Performance:
  - Pierre Fournier, Arthur Rubinstein & Henryk Szeryng for Schubert: Trios Nos. 1 in B-flat, Op. 99 and 2 in E-flat, Op. 100 (Piano Trios) (Grammy Awards of 1976)
  - Pierre Fournier, Arthur Rubinstein & Henryk Szeryng for Brahms: Trios (Complete)/Schumann: Trio No. 1 in D Minor (Grammy Awards of 1975)
- Grammy Award for Best Instrumental Soloist Performance (without orchestra):
  - Arthur Rubinstein for 'Beethoven: Piano Sonata No. 18 in E-flat/Schumann: Fantasiestücke, Op. 12 (Grammy Awards of 1978)
  - Arthur Rubinstein for Beethoven: Sonatas No. 21 in C (Waldstein) and No. 18 in E-flat (Grammy Awards of 1960)
- Grammy Lifetime Achievement Award (1994)
- Star on the Hollywood Walk of Fame

== Filmography ==
- Night Song (1948)
- Arthur Rubinstein – The Love of Life (L'Amour de la vie – Artur Rubinstein, 1969)

== See also ==
- List of Polish people (music)
