= America as Seen by a Frenchman =

1960 French documentary film

- Directed by: François Reichenbach
- Written by: Chris Marker; François Reichenbach
- Produced by: Pierre Braunberger
- Starring: Paul Klinger
- Cinematography: Marcel Grignon; François Reichenbach; Jean-Marc Ripert
- Edited by: Albert Jurgenson
- Release date: May 1960
- Running time: 90 minutes
- Country: France
- Language: French

America as Seen by a Frenchman (French: L'Amérique insolite) is a 1960 French documentary film directed by François Reichenbach. It was entered into the 1960 Cannes Film Festival.

== Cast ==
- Paul Klinger as Voice (German language version)
- June Richmond as Sings: The Zulu-Song
