= May December (soundtrack) =

May December (Soundtrack from the Netflix Film)

Film score by Marcelo Zarvos and Michel Legrand
- Released: December 1, 2023
- Genre: Film score
- Length: 20:45
- Label: Netflix Music
- Producer: Marcelo Zarvos

Marcelo Zarvos chronology
Cassandro (2023)	May December (2023)

Michel Legrand chronology
The Other Side of the Wind (2018)	May December (2023)

May December (Soundtrack from the Netflix Film) is the soundtrack to the 2023 film of the same name directed by Todd Haynes. The film is scored by Marcelo Zarvos who adapted late Michel Legrand's compositions from The Go-Between (1971), while also scoring original tunes. The score was released by Netflix Music on December 1, 2023.

== Development ==
May December is scored by Marcelo Zarvos, who previously collaborated with Haynes on Dark Waters (2019). Zarvos adapted and reorchestrated the music from Legrand's The Go-Between and alternatively composed melodies in piano. According to Haynes, "the score sits so upfront and ahead of and beyond the ultimate events that unfold in that particular storyline" where the audiences be alert of an incident happening, and then read the details in the frame and the performances acutely, in every single moment. The music reinforces that in a mischievous sense, where this can be a pleasurable inquisition.

Haynes initially thought of the music while reading the script and regularly played the score from that film in both the filming and editing process, attempting the film's need to give the audience that kind of invitation and employ the emotional effect throughout, in scenes that lacked dialogues. While supervising the edit, he shared the cues from the score to Zarvos which he felt excited and used many aspects of the music that he had adapted and added original music to it and re-orchestrated it. This even served as a metaphor for the film.

== Reception ==
Bilge Ebiri of Variety described the music "dramatic" that announces the "ridiculous tonal shifts this seemingly placid film will take". Farah Cheded of Paste and Shirley Li of The Atlantic described it as "histrionic" and "discordant", while Wendy Ide of The Observer called it as "deliciously overwrought" score that "brings with it a frisson of illicit passions". Sean Collier of Pittsburgh Magazine called it as a "hyperactive, daytime-movie style score [...] highlights the incongruity". Justin Chang of Los Angeles Times said that Zarvos "offers a lush reworking of Michel Legrand's score from the 1971 romantic drama 'The Go-Between'."

== Track listing ==
No.	Title	Music	Length
1.	"Opening"	Michel Legrand	1:14
2.	"Elizabeth Drives"	Marcelo Zarvos	1:56
3.	"Studying Gracie"	Legrand	1:54
4.	"Butterfly Eggs"	Legrand	1:37
5.	"Elizabeth Meets Ex"	Legrand	0:57
6.	"Storage Room"	Zarvos	1:06
7.	"Old Photos"	Legrand	0:36
8.	"Joe and Father Talk"	Zarvos	0:38
9.	"School Visit"	Zarvos	0:51
10.	"Graduation"	Legrand	2:18
11.	"Gracie Cries"	Zarvos	1:36
12.	"Mirror Images"	Legrand	0:47
13.	"Joe Showers"	Legrand	1:12
14.	"Dropping Off Mary"	Zarvos	0:58
15.	"The Letter"	Zarvos	0:32
16.	"Elizabeth On Set"	Legrand	2:33
Total length:			20:45
