= Carleton Smith =

Robert Carleton Smith (19 February 1908 – 28 May 1984 in Centre Island, New York) was the director of the National Arts Foundation and organized the International Awards Foundation to establish awards in fields not covered by the Nobel Prize.

Smith was instrumental in establishing the Pritzker Architecture Prize and the J. Paul Getty Award for Conservation Leadership. Smith taught music appreciation at the University of Illinois from 1926 to 1929, economics and foreign trade at De Paul University from 1928 to 1934, and music history at Oxford University from 1931 to 1939. He was the music editor of Esquire and was European correspondent for the New York Herald Tribune. From the late 1940s to the early 1970s, he helped recover music manuscripts that had gone missing during the war. A critical evaluation of Smith's role in the recovery was published by the journalist Nigel Lewis in 1981.
