= François Reichenbach =

French film director (1921–1993)

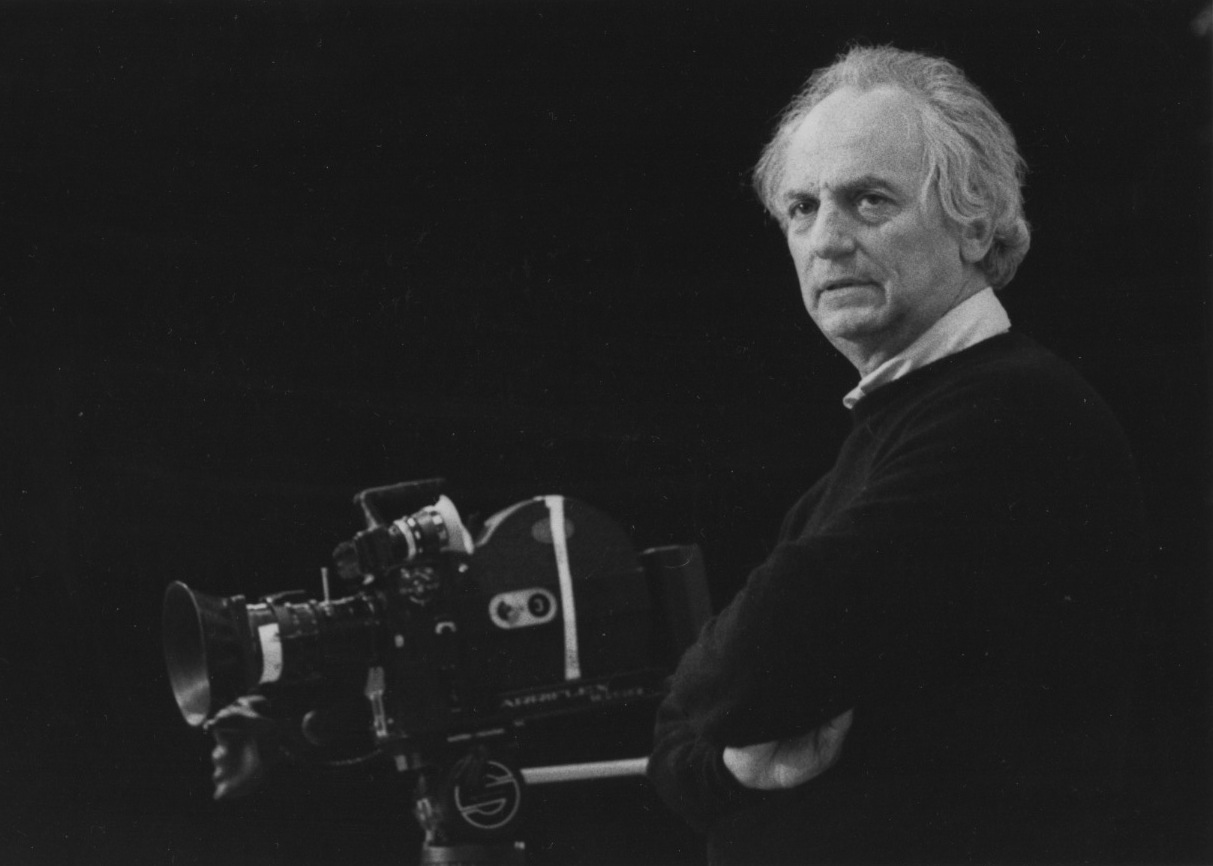
- Born: 3 July 1921; Paris, France
- Died: 2 February 1993 (aged 71); Neuilly-sur-Seine, France
- Occupations: Film director, cinematographer, screenwriter
- Years active: 1954–1993

François Arnold Reichenbach (3 July 1921 – 2 February 1993) was a French film director, cinematographer, producer, and screenwriter. He directed 40 films between 1954 and 1993.

== Early life ==
François Reichenbach was born in 1921 in Neuilly-sur-Seine. His father, Bernard Reichenbach, was a successful businessman and his mother, Germaine Angèle Sarah Monteux, had a passion for music, which she passed on to young François.

His maternal grandfather, Gaston Monteux, was a wealthy industrialist: he was one of the first to buy paintings by Chagall, Braque, Picasso, Soutine, Utrillo and Modigliani. In his memoirs, Reichenbach says: "At the age of five I was terrified by all the faces in the paintings. And I became a forger. I added mustaches and hair to the nudes of Modigliani. This hoax takes on another dimension when you know that I made a film with Orson Welles about the forger Elmyr de Hory in 1973."

He is the nephew of the industrialist and book collector Jacques Guérin, and the cousin of movie producer Pierre Braunberger, who encouraged him to make films.

== Emigration ==
During the Second World War, François Reichenbach went to Geneva. Although he was born in France, he also has Swiss nationality because his paternal grandfather, Arnold Reichenbach, is a rich Swiss industrialist working in the embroidery industry in St. Gallen. He studied music at the Geneva Conservatory of Music, where he met the film director Gérard Oury.

After the Liberation, he wrote songs, notably for Édith Piaf and Marie Dubas.

Then, remembering the huge collection of paintings of his childhood, he left for the United States with an emigrant card to sell paintings. He started in New York as an advisor to American museums for the purchase of works of art in Europe, then he sold master paintings. He spent several years in the United States.

== Death ==
On his deathbed, François Reichenbach confided to screenwriter Danièle Thompson his desire to be buried in Limoges, where he had spent vacations in his youth.

Faced with Thompson's argument that it would be inconvenient to visit him, the filmmaker replied, "Those who love me will take the train" This quote inspired Thompson to write the title of the film Ceux qui m'aiment prendront le train ("Those Who Love Me Can Take the Train") by Patrice Chéreau, starring Jean-Louis Trintignant, Charles Berling and Vincent Perez.

François Reichenbach died on February 2, 1993, in Neuilly-sur-Seine, a posh neighbourhood near the capital. He is buried in the Louyat cemetery in Limoges.

== Work as a director ==
François Reichenbach, a pioneer of the New Wave movement, is recognized for his significant contributions to cinematography and for offering a free and respectful perspective on his subjects. Known for his readiness to capture spontaneous moments, he reportedly kept a camera in his car at all times to film anything that moved. The magazine Cahiers du cinéma noted that “François Reichenbach was born with a camera to his eye.”

In 1954, Reichenbach bought his first 16mm Bell & Howell camera and made his fourth short film "Impressions de New York," which won the Special Jury Prize at the Tours Film Festival and a mention at the Edinburgh International Film Festival: his career as a filmmaker was launched. He films everything that comes into his head, with both eyes open. He says that "cinema is made by one-eyed people: one eye in the viewfinder, the other closed to better concentrate on the image. He keeps the other one open (the human eye) so as not to lose contact and not to abandon the filmed subject to the machine that is the camera.

In 1957, he directed his first short film, The Marines, about an elite American unit, which imposed a new style through the impression of truth, the nerve and the originality of the gaze.

Reichenbach tirelessly films what he observes according to his inspiration and his wanderings. Above all, he likes to present himself as a musician. He has made more than a hundred documentaries, alternating between France, the United States and Mexico, with a very personal filmography and artistic reports close to journalism. He has made a wide variety of portraits, including the film-maker Orson Welles, musicians Yehudi Menuhin, Arthur Rubinstein, Mstislav Rostropovich, Manitas de Plata, popular artists such as Johnny Hallyday, Sylvie Vartan, Barbara, Mireille Mathieu, Diane Dufresne, Vince Taylor, soccer players Pelé and Pascal Olmeta, the matador El Cordobés, the sculptor Arman, the guitarist Manitas de Plata, the painter Marguerite Dunoyer de Segonzac, the cigar merchant Zino Davidoff, the Austrian conductor Herbert von Karajan, and the actresses Jeanne Moreau and Brigitte Bardot.

François Reichenbach is also the director of the 'scopitone' (the ancestor of the music video) "Bonnie and Clyde" (1967), sung by Serge Gainsbourg and Brigitte Bardot.

In 1960, his first feature film, America As Seen by a Frenchman, caused a sensation with its new style, its impression of truth, and the originality of its vision. It documented the American citizen from his birth to his death, in all the comical, burlesque, and unusual circumstances of his life.

In 1964, he received the Palme d'Or at the Cannes Film Festival for his short film La Douceur du village. It shows with simplicity and poetry the life of a country schoolboy in the village of Loué. Then, François Reichenbach received the Academy Award for Best Documentary Feature Film in 1970 for Arthur Rubinstein – The Love of Life.

At the end of his life he returned to Geneva, the city of his musical studies, to make four films: "The Art of Cigar Smoking by Zino Davidoff" (1983), "Geneva" (1988), "Nestlé by Reichenbach" (1990), and "Swiss Faces for the 700th anniversary of the Swiss Confederation" (1991).

== Selected filmography ==
- Nus masculins ("Male nudes") (1954)
- Last Spring (1954)
- America As Seen by a Frenchman (1960)
- Arthur Rubinstein – The Love of Life (1969)
- F for Fake (1975)
- Do You Hear the Dogs Barking? (1975)
