= Troublemaker =

Troublemaker, The Troublemaker, Trouble Maker, or Trouble Makers may refer to:

== Film ==
- Troublemaker Studios, a Texan film production company founded by Robert Rodriguez and Elizabeth Avellan
- Troublemakers (1917 film), a lost silent film drama
- The Troublemaker (1924 film), a Spanish silent film
- Trouble Makers (1948 film), an American film
- The Troublemaker (1950 film), a Spanish musical comedy film
- The Troublemaker (1963 film), a Spanish musical film
- The Troublemaker (1964 film), a film by Theodore J. Flicker
- Trouble-Maker (film), a 1964 Canadian drama film
- The Troublemaker (1969 film), a Spanish musical film
- Troublemakers (1994 film), a Western comedy film
- Trouble Maker (film), a 1995 Taiwan and Hong Kong romance comedy film
- The Trouble-Makers, a 2003 Hong Kong film
- Trouble Makers (2006 film), a Chinese film
- Troublemakers (2015 film), a documentary film by James Crump
- El revoltoso (The Troublemaker), a 1951 Mexican film

== Literature ==
- Troublemaker: Surviving Hollywood and Scientology, a 2015 book by Leah Remini
- Troublemaker: Let's Do What It Takes to Make America Great Again, a 2011 book by Christine O'Donnell
- Troublemaker, a 2011 book by Andrew Clements
- The Troublemakers (graphic novel), a graphic novel by American cartoonist Gilbert Hernandez

== Music ==
- The Troublemaker (zarzuela), a Spanish zarzuela (opera)
- Trouble Maker (duo), a South Korean music duo
- Troublemakers (French band), an electronic music band
- Troublemakers (Swedish band), a punk rock bank

=== Albums ===
- Troublemaker (album), a 1979 album by Ian McLagan
- The Troublemaker (album), a 1976 album by Willie Nelson
- Trouble Maker (album), a 2017 album by Rancid
- Trouble Maker (EP), a 2011 EP by Trouble Maker

=== Songs ===
- "Troublemaker" (Akon song) (2008)
- "Troublemaker" (Arashi song) (2010)
- "Trouble Maker" (Trouble Maker song) (2011)
- "Troublemaker" (Taio Cruz song) (2011)
- "Trouble-Maker" (song), a 1976 song by Roberta Kelly
- "Troublemaker" (Olly Murs song) (2012)
- "Troublemaker" (Weezer song) (2008)
- "Troublemaker", a 2012 song by Beach House from Bloom
- "Troublemaker", a 2012 song by Green Day from ¡Uno!
- "Trouble Maker", a 1976 song by Hummingbird
- "Trouble Maker", a 1969 song by Johnny Darrell

== Other uses ==
- Trouble Maker (car), an American gasser driven by Joe Lunati
- Troublemaker, an American harness racing horse that won the 1984 Messenger Stakes
- Troublemaker, a 2014 Showtime Dane Cook comedy special
- The Troublemakers (Playhouse 90), an American television play
