= The Troublemaker (1969 film) =

- Directed by: Juan de Orduña
- Written by: Carlos Fernández Shaw (libretto); José López Silva (libretto); Manuel Tamayo
- Starring: José Sacristán; Antonio Durán; Elisa Ramírez
- Cinematography: Federico G. Larraya
- Production company: Televisión Española
- Distributed by: Regia-Arturo González Rodríguez
- Release date: 9 December 1969
- Running time: 110 minutes
- Country: Spain
- Language: Spanish

The Troublemaker (Spanish: La revoltosa) is a 1969 Spanish musical film directed by Juan de Orduña and starring José Sacristán, Antonio Durán and Elisa Ramírez. The film is based on the 1897 zarzuela of the same title by Carlos Fernández Shaw and José López Silva, and was the second adaptation made that decade following The Troublemaker in 1963. The film was made with the financial backing of Televisión Española.

== Cast ==
- José Sacristán as Tiberio
- Antonio Durán as Atenedoro
- Manuel Fernández Aranda as Chupitos
- Elisa Ramírez as Mari Pepa
- Antonio Casal as Cándido
- María Luisa Ponte as Gorgonia
- José Moreno as Felipe
- Antonio Martelo as Sr. Candelas
- Mónica Randall as Encarna
- Marisa Paredes as Soledad

== Bibliography ==
- Bentley, Bernard. A Companion to Spanish Cinema. Boydell & Brewer 2008.
