= The Taming of the Shrew =

Play by William Shakespeare

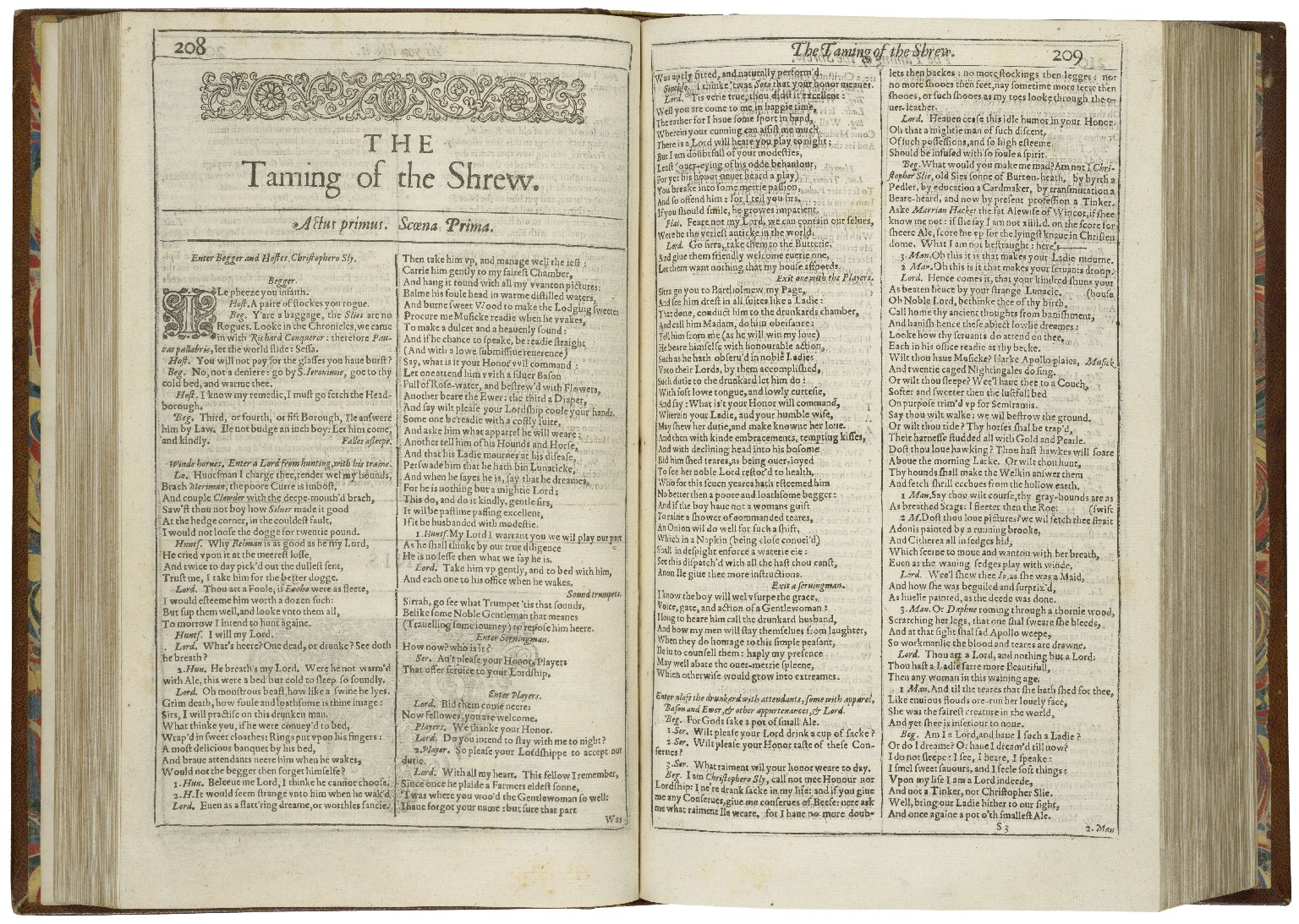
First page of The Taming of the Shrew from the First Folio (1623)

The Taming of the Shrew is a comedy by William Shakespeare written between 1590 and 1592. The play begins with a framing device, often referred to as the induction, (Note: The term was first used by Alexander Pope in 1725, and has been commonly employed ever since. The First Folio text begins the play with the standard "Actus primus, Scœna prima" heading, and there is no differentiation between the Induction and what is commonly referred to today as Act 1, Scene 1 (Lucentio arriving in Padua).) in which a mischievous nobleman tricks a drunken tinker named Christopher Sly into believing he is actually a nobleman himself. The nobleman then has the play performed for Sly's diversion.

The main plot depicts the courtship of Petruchio and Katherina, the headstrong, obdurate shrew. Initially, Katherina is an unwilling participant in the relationship; however, Petruchio "tames" her with various psychological and physical torments, such as keeping her from eating and drinking, until she becomes a desirable, compliant, and obedient bride. The subplot features a competition among the suitors of Katherina's younger sister, Bianca, who is seen as the "ideal" woman. The question of whether the play is misogynistic has become the subject of considerable controversy.

The Taming of the Shrew has been adapted numerous times for stage, screen, opera, ballet, and musical theatre, perhaps the most famous adaptations being Cole Porter's Kiss Me, Kate; McLintock!, a 1963 American Western comedy film, starring John Wayne and Maureen O'Hara; and the 1967 film of the play, starring Elizabeth Taylor and Richard Burton. The 1999 high-school comedy film 10 Things I Hate About You and the 2003 romantic comedy Deliver Us from Eva are also loosely based on the play.

== Characters ==
- Katherina Minola – the "shrew" of the title
- Bianca Minola – sister of Katherina, the ingénue
- Baptista Minola – father of Katherina and Bianca
- Petruchio – suitor of Katherina
- Gremio – elderly suitor of Bianca
- Lucentio – suitor of Bianca
- Hortensio – suitor of Bianca and friend to Petruchio
- Grumio – Petruchio's manservant
- Tranio – Lucentio's manservant
- Biondello – servant of Lucentio
- Vincentio – father of Lucentio
- Widow – wooed by Hortensio
- Pedant – pretends to be Vincentio
- Haberdasher
- Tailor
- Curtis – servant of Petruchio
- Nathaniel – servant of Petruchio
- Joseph – servant of Petruchio
- Peter – servant of Petruchio
- Nicholas – servant of Petruchio
- Philip – servant of Petruchio
- Officer

Characters appearing in the Induction:

- Christopher Sly – a drunken tinker
- Hostess of an alehouse
- Lord – plays a prank on Sly
- Bartholomew – Lord's page boy
- Lord's Huntsman
- Players
- Servingmen
- Messenger

== Synopsis ==
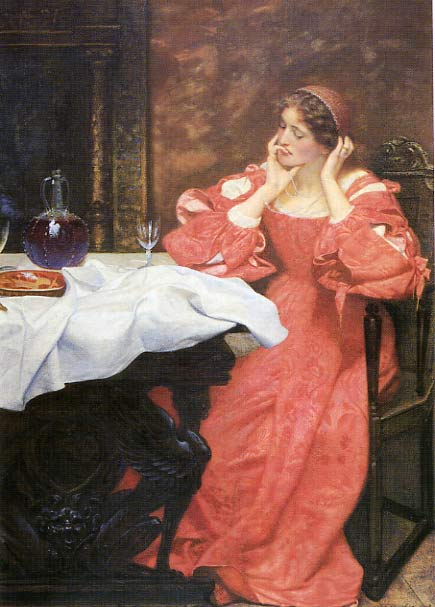
The Shrew Katherina by Edward Robert Hughes (1898)

Prior to the first act, an induction frames the play as a "kind of history" played in front of a befuddled drunkard named Christopher Sly who is tricked into believing that he is a lord. The play is performed in order to distract Sly from his "wife," who is actually Bartholomew, a servant, dressed as a woman.

In the play performed for Sly, the "shrew" is Katherina, the elder daughter of Baptista Minola, a lord in Padua. Numerous men, including Tranio, deem Katherina an unworthy option for marriage because of her notorious assertiveness and willfulness. On the other hand, men such as Hortensio and Gremio are eager to marry her younger sister Bianca. However, Baptista has sworn Bianca is not allowed to marry until Katherina is wed; this motivates Bianca's suitors to work together to find Katherina a husband so that they may compete for Bianca. The plot thickens when Lucentio, who has recently come to Padua to attend university, falls in love with Bianca. Overhearing Baptista say that he is on the lookout for tutors for his daughters, Lucentio devises a plan in which he disguises himself as a Latin tutor named Cambio in order to woo Bianca behind Baptista's back and meanwhile has his servant Tranio pretend to be him.

In the meantime, Petruchio, accompanied by his servant Grumio, arrives in Padua from Verona. He explains to Hortensio, an old friend of his, that since his father's death, he has set out to enjoy life and wed. Hearing this, Hortensio recruits Petruchio as a suitor for Katherina. He also has Petruchio present him (Hortensio) to Baptista disguised as a music tutor named Litio. Thus, Lucentio and Hortensio attempt to woo Bianca while pretending to be the tutors Cambio and Litio respectively.

To counter Katherina's shrewish nature, Petruchio pretends that any harsh things she says or does are actually kind and gentle. Katherina agrees to marry Petruchio after seeing that he is the only man willing to counter her quick remarks; however, at the ceremony, Petruchio makes an embarrassing scene when he strikes the priest and drinks the communion wine. After the wedding, Petruchio takes Katherina to his home against her will. Once they are gone, Gremio and Tranio (disguised as Lucentio) formally bid for Bianca, with Tranio easily outbidding Gremio. However, in his zeal to win, he promises much more than Lucentio possesses. When Baptista determines that once Lucentio's father confirms the dowry, Bianca and Tranio (i.e., Lucentio) can marry, Tranio decides that they will need someone to pretend to be Vincentio, Lucentio's father. Meanwhile, Tranio persuades Hortensio that Bianca is not worthy of his attention, thus removing Lucentio's remaining rival.

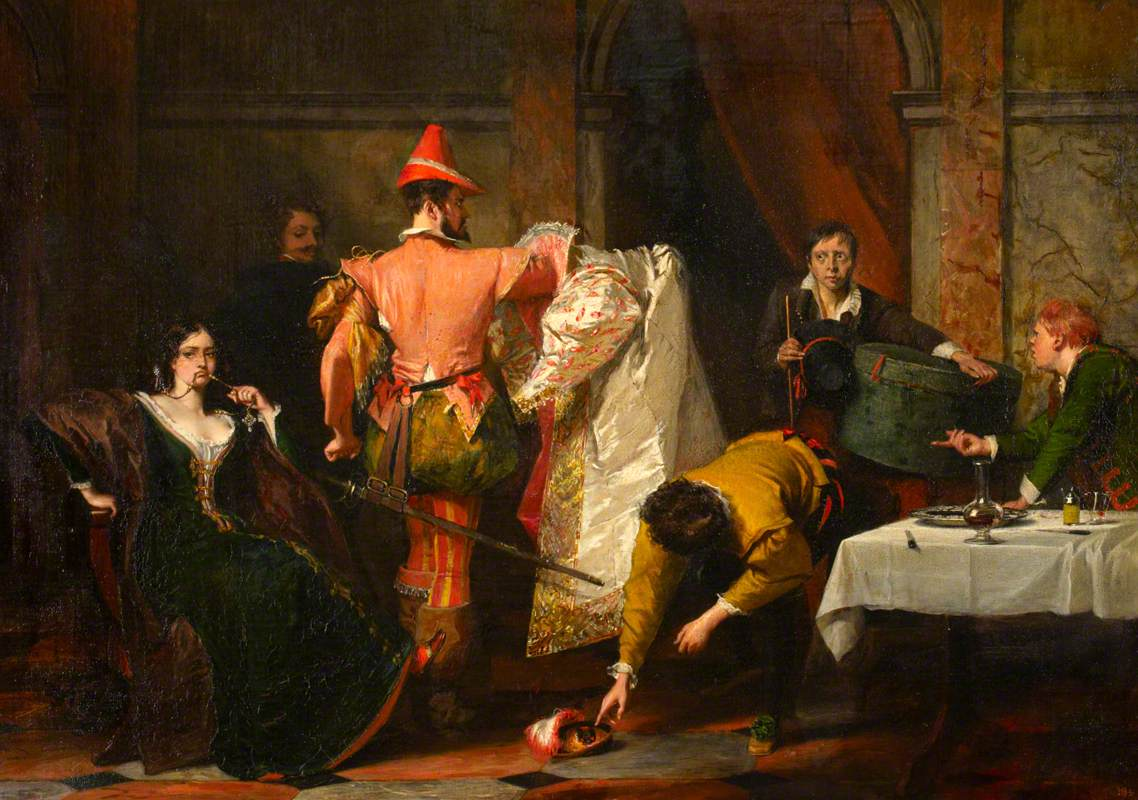
Catherine and Petruchio (from William Shakespeare's 'The Taming of the Shrew', Act IV, Scene i), Charles Robert Leslie (1832)

In Verona, Petruchio begins the "taming" of his new wife. She is refused food and clothing because nothing – according to Petruchio – is good enough for her; he claims that perfectly cooked meat is overcooked, a beautiful dress doesn't fit right, and a stylish hat is not fashionable. He also disagrees with everything that she says, forcing her to agree with everything that he says, no matter how absurd; on their way back to Padua to attend Bianca's wedding, she agrees with Petruchio that the sun is the moon, and proclaims "if you please to call it a rush-candle,/Henceforth I vow it shall be so for me" (4.5.14–15). Along the way, they meet Vincentio, who is also on his way to Padua, and Katherina agrees with Petruchio when he declares that Vincentio is a woman and then apologises to Vincentio when Petruchio tells her that he is a man.

Back in Padua, Lucentio and Tranio convince a passing pedant to pretend to be Vincentio and confirm the dowry for Bianca. The man does so, and Baptista is happy for Bianca to wed Lucentio (still Tranio in disguise). Bianca, aware of the deception, then secretly elopes with the real Lucentio to get married. However, when Vincentio reaches Padua, he encounters the pedant, who claims to be Lucentio's father. Tranio (still disguised as Lucentio) appears, and the pedant acknowledges him to be his son Lucentio. In all the confusion, the real Vincentio is set to be arrested, when the real Lucentio appears with his newly betrothed Bianca, revealing all to a bewildered Baptista and Vincentio. Lucentio explains everything, and all is forgiven by the two fathers.

Meanwhile, Hortensio has married a rich widow. In the final scene of the play, there are three newly married couples: Bianca and Lucentio, the widow and Hortensio, and Katherina and Petruchio. Because of the general opinion that Petruchio is married to a shrew, a good-natured quarrel breaks out amongst the three men about whose wife is the most obedient. Petruchio proposes a wager whereby each will send a servant to call for his wife, and whichever comes most obediently will have won the wager for her husband. Katherina is the only one of the three who comes, winning the wager for Petruchio. She then hauls the other two wives into the room, giving a speech on why wives should always obey their husbands. The play ends with Baptista, Hortensio and Lucentio marvelling at how successfully Petruchio has tamed the shrew.

== Sources ==
Although there is no direct literary source for the induction, the tale of a commoner being duped into believing he is a lord is one found in many literary traditions. Such a story is recorded in Arabian Nights where Harun al-Rashid plays the same trick on a man he finds sleeping in an alley. Another is found in De Rebus Burgundicis (1584) by the Dutch historian Pontus de Huyter, where Philip, Duke of Burgundy, after attending his sister's wedding in Portugal, finds a drunken "artisan" whom he entertains with a "pleasant Comedie." Arabian Nights was not translated into English until the mid-18th century, although Shakespeare may have known it by word of mouth. He could also have known about the Duke of Burgundy story because although De Rebus was not translated into French until 1600 and not into English until 1607, there is evidence the story existed in English in a jest book (now lost) by Richard Edwardes, written in 1570.

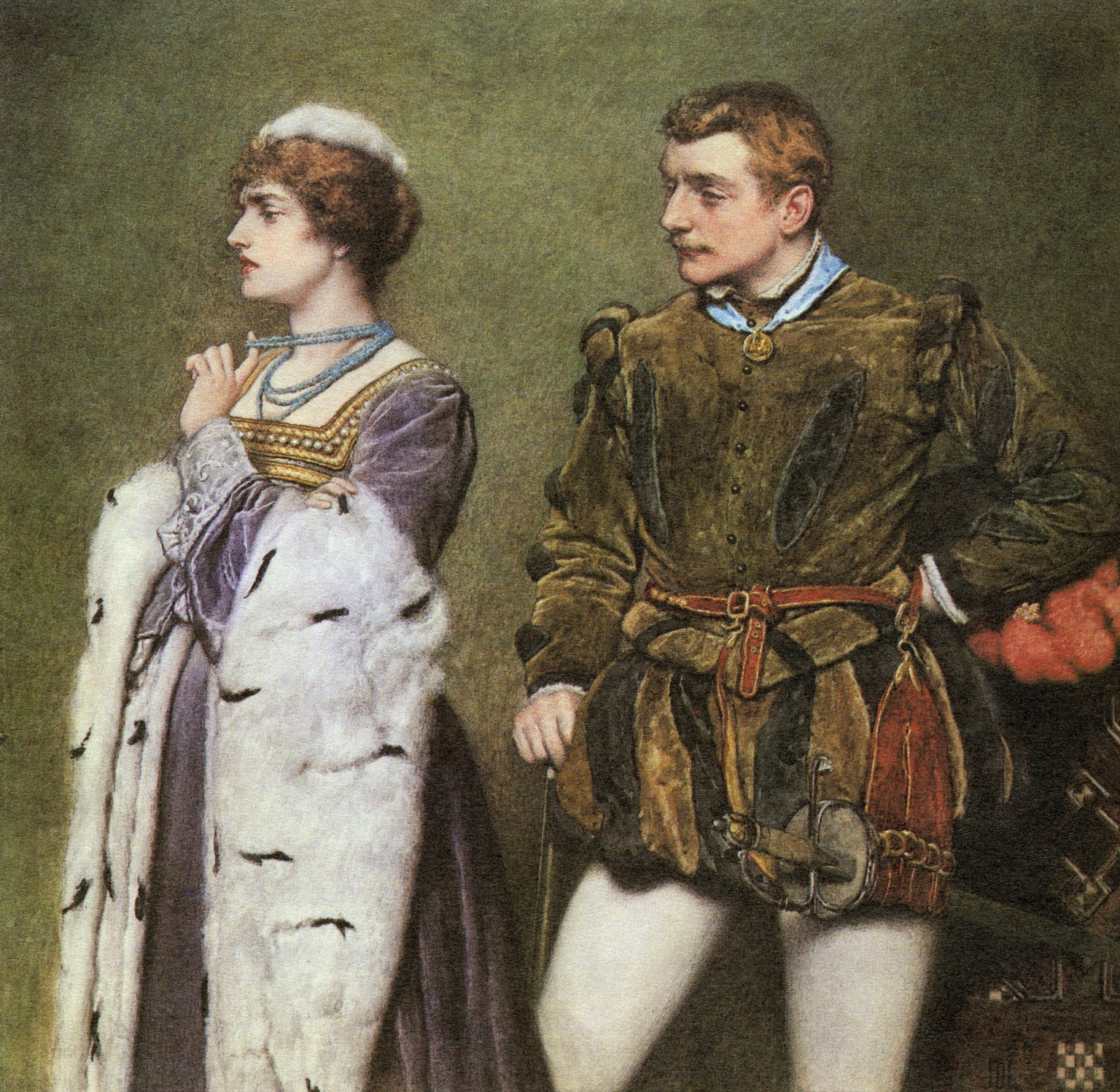
Taming of the Shrew. Katherine and Petruchio by James Dromgole Linton (c. 1890)

Regarding the Petruchio/Katherina story, there are a variety of possible influences, but no one specific source. The basic elements of the narrative are present in tale 35 of the fourteenth-century Spanish book Libro de los ejemplos del conde Lucanor y de Patronio by Don Juan Manuel, which tells of a young man who marries a "very strong and fiery woman." The text had been translated into English by the sixteenth century, but there is no evidence that Shakespeare drew on it. The story of a headstrong woman tamed by a man was well known, and found in numerous traditions. For example, according to The Canterbury Tales by Geoffrey Chaucer, Noah's wife was such a woman ('"Hastow nought herd," quod Nicholas, "also/The sorwe of Noë with his felaschippe/That he had or he gat his wyf to schipe"'; The Miller's Tale, l. 352–354), and it was common for her to be depicted in this manner in mystery plays. Historically, another such woman was Xanthippe, Socrates' wife, who is mentioned by Petruchio himself (1.2.70). Such characters also occur throughout medieval literature, in popular farces both before and during Shakespeare's lifetime and in folklore.

In 1890, Alfred Tolman conjectured a possible literary source for the wager scene may have been William Caxton's 1484 translation of Geoffroy IV de la Tour Landry's Livre pour l'enseignement de ses filles du Chevalier de La Tour Landry (1372). Written for his daughters as a guide on how to behave appropriately, de la Tour Landry includes "a treatise on the domestic education of women" which features an anecdote in which three merchants make a wager as to which of their wives will prove the most obedient when called upon to jump into a basin of water. The episode sees the first two wives refuse to obey (as in the play), it ends at a banquet (as does the play) and it features a speech regarding the "correct" way for a husband to discipline his wife. (Note: The complete English text of the episode is: "Three merchants, riding home from a fair, fell to talking about the charm of obedience in a wife. At last they laid a wager of a dinner, agreeing that the one whose wife should prove the least obedient should pay for the dinner. Each man was to warn his wife to do whatever he might bid; afterward he was to set a basin before her and bid her leap into it. The first wife insisted on knowing the reason for the command; she received several blows from her husband's fist. The second wife flatly refused to obey; she was thoroughly beaten with a staff. The wife of the third merchant received the same warning as the rest, but the intended trial was postponed until after dinner. During the meal this wife was asked to put salt upon the table. Because of a similarity between the two expressions in French, she understood her husband to command her to leap upon the table. She at once did so, throwing down the meat and drink and breaking the glasses. When she stated the reason for her conduct, the other merchants acknowledged without further trial that they had lost the wager.") In 1959, John W. Shroeder conjectured that Chevalier de La Tour Landry's depiction of the Queen Vastis story may also have been an influence on Shakespeare.

In 1964, Richard Hosley suggested the main source for the play may have been the anonymous ballad "A merry jeste of a shrewde and curst Wyfe, lapped in Morrelles Skin, for her good behauyour". The ballad tells the story of a marriage in which the husband must tame his headstrong wife. Like Shrew, the story features a family with two sisters, the younger of whom is seen as mild and desirable. However, in "Merry Jest", the older sister is obdurate not because it is simply her nature, but because she has been raised by her shrewish mother to seek mastery over men. Ultimately, the couple returns to the family house, where the now-tamed woman lectures her sister on the merits of being an obedient wife. The taming in this version is much more physical than in Shakespeare; the shrew is beaten with birch rods until she bleeds and is then wrapped in the salted flesh of a plough horse (the Morrelle of the title). (Note: Complete Text of A Merry Jest.) "Merry Jest" was not unknown to earlier editors of the play, and had been dismissed as a source by A.R. Frey, W.C. Hazlitt, R. Warwick Bond and Frederick S. Boas. Modern editors also express doubt as to Hosley's argument.

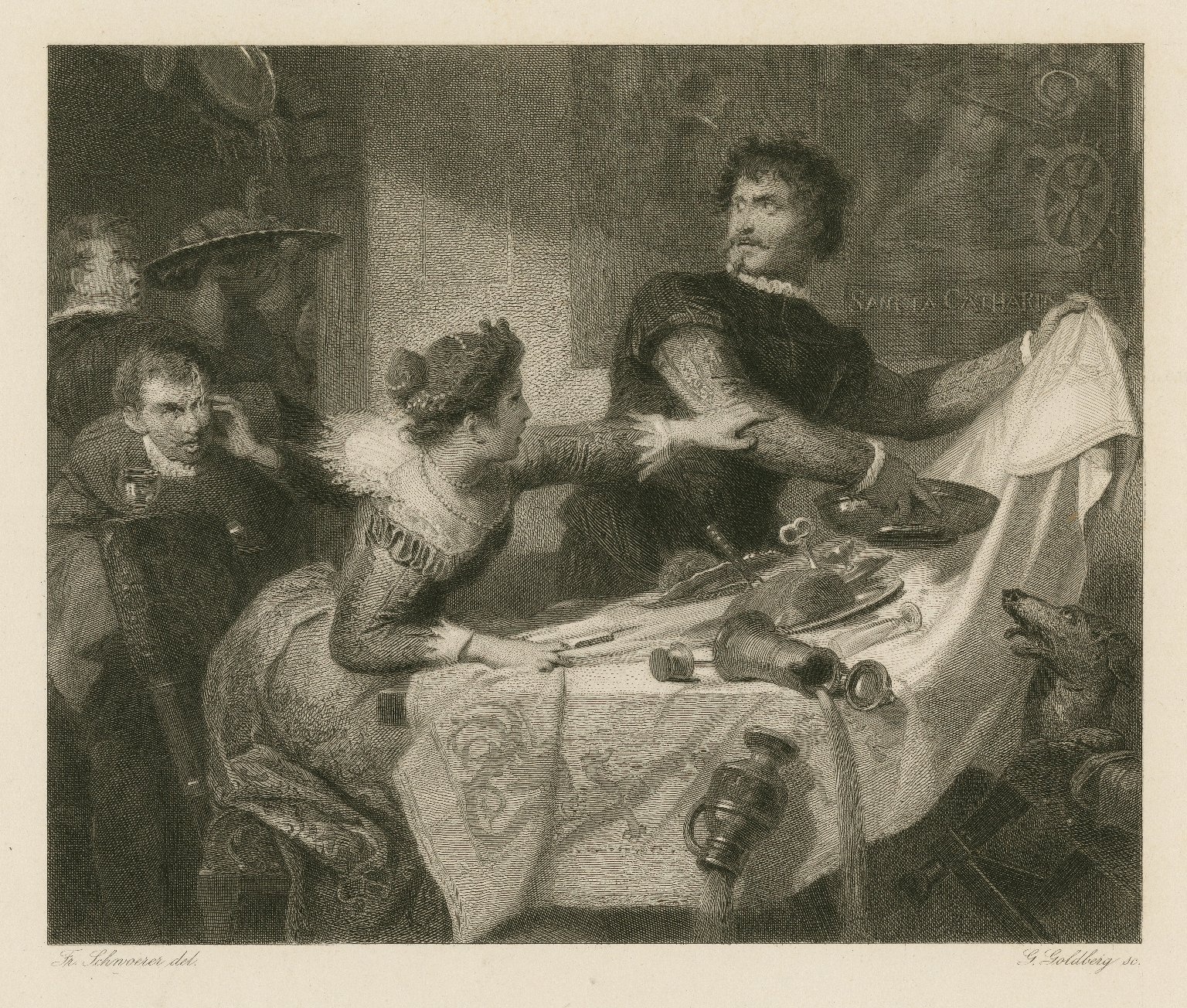
Fr. Schwoerer illustration of Act 4, Scene 1 (Petruchio rejects the bridal dinner). Engraved by Georg Goldberg (c.1850).

In 1966, Jan Harold Brunvand argued that the main source for the play was not literary, but the oral folktale tradition. He argued the Petruchio/Katherina story represents an example of Type 901 ('Shrew-taming Complex') in the Aarne–Thompson classification system. Brunvand discovered 383 oral examples of Type 901 spread over thirty European countries, but he could find only 35 literary examples, leading him to conclude that "Shakespeare's taming plot, which has not been traced successfully in its entirety to any known printed version, must have come ultimately from oral tradition." Most contemporary critics accept Brunvand's findings.

A source for Shakespeare's subplot was first identified by Alfred Tolman in 1890 as Ludovico Ariosto's I Suppositi, which was published in 1551. George Gascoigne's English prose translation Supposes was performed in 1566 and printed in 1573. In I Suppositi, Erostrato (the equivalent of Lucentio) falls in love with Polynesta (Bianca), daughter of Damon (Baptista). Erostrato disguises himself as Dulipo (Tranio), a servant, whilst the real Dulipo pretends to be Erostrato. Having done this, Erostrato is hired as a tutor for Polynesta. Meanwhile, Dulipo pretends to formally woo Polynesta so as to frustrate the wooing of the aged Cleander (Gremio). Dulipo outbids Cleander, but he promises far more than he can deliver, so he and Erostrato dupe a travelling gentleman from Siena into pretending to be Erostrato's father, Philogano (Vincentio). However, when Polynesta is found to be pregnant, Damon has Dulipo imprisoned (the real father is Erostrato). Soon thereafter, the real Philogano arrives, and all comes to a head. Erostrato reveals himself, and begs clemency for Dulipo. Damon realises that Polynesta is truly in love with Erostrato, and so forgives the subterfuge. Having been released from jail, Dulipo then discovers he is Cleander's son. An additional minor source is Mostellaria by Plautus, from which Shakespeare probably took the names of Tranio and Grumio.

== Date and text ==
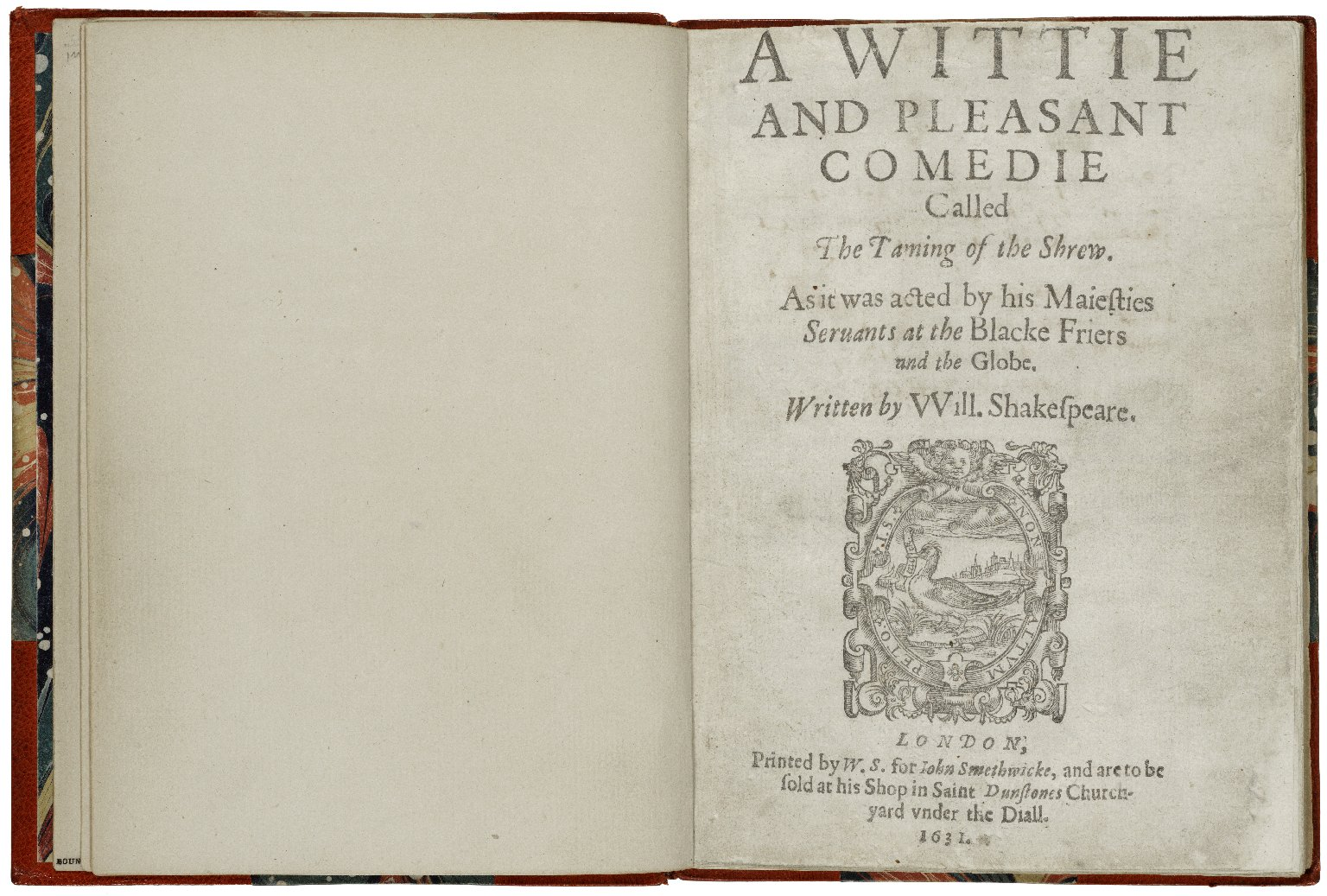
Title page from the first quarto, printed in 1631 as A Wittie and Pleasant Comedie Called The Taming of the Shrew

=== Date ===
Efforts to date the play's composition are complicated by its uncertain relationship with another Elizabethan play entitled A Pleasant Conceited Historie, called the taming of a Shrew, which has an almost identical plot but different wording and character names. (Note: From this point forward, The Taming of a Shrew will be referred to as A Shrew; The Taming of the Shrew as The Shrew.) The Shrew's exact relationship with A Shrew is unknown. Different theories suggest A Shrew could be a reported text of a performance of The Shrew, a source for The Shrew, an early draft (possibly reported) of The Shrew, or an adaptation of The Shrew. A Shrew was entered in the Stationers' Register on 2 May 1594, suggesting that whatever the relationship between the two plays, The Shrew was most likely written somewhere between 1590 (roughly when Shakespeare arrived in London) and 1594 (registration of A Shrew).

Some writers suggest, that it is possible to narrow the date further. A terminus ante quem for A Shrew could be August 1592, as a stage direction at 3.21 mentions "Simon," which probably refers to the actor Simon Jewell, who was buried on 21 August 1592. Furthermore, The Shrew seems to have been written earlier than 1593, as Anthony Chute's Beauty Dishonoured, written under the title of Shore's wife (published in June 1593) contains the line "He calls his Kate, and she must come and kiss him." This must refer to The Shrew, as there is no corresponding "kissing scene" in A Shrew. There are also verbal similarities between both Shrew plays and the anonymous play A Knack To Know A Knave (first performed at The Rose on 10 June 1592). Knack features several passages common to both A Shrew and The Shrew, but it also borrows several passages unique to The Shrew. This suggests The Shrew was on stage prior to June 1592.

In his 1982 edition of the play for The Oxford Shakespeare, H.J. Oliver suggests the play was composed no later than 1592. He bases this on the title page of A Shrew, which mentions the play had been performed "sundry times" by Pembroke's Men. When the London theatres were closed on 23 June 1592 due to an outbreak of plague, Pembroke's Men went on a regional tour to Bath and Ludlow. The tour was a financial failure, and the company returned to London on 28 September, financially ruined. Over the next three years, four plays with their name on the title page were published; Christopher Marlowe's Edward II (published in quarto in July 1593), and Shakespeare's Titus Andronicus (published in quarto in 1594), The True Tragedy of Richard Duke of York (published in octavo in 1595) and The Taming of a Shrew (published in quarto in May 1594). Oliver says it is a "natural assumption" that these publications were sold by members of Pembroke's Men who were broke after the failed tour. Oliver assumes that A Shrew is a reported version of The Shrew, which means The Shrew must have been in their possession when they began their tour in June, as they didn't perform it upon returning to London in September, nor would they have taken possession of any new material at that time.

Ann Thompson considers A Shrew to be a reported text in her 1984 and 2003 editions of the play for the New Cambridge Shakespeare. She focuses on the closure of the theatres on 23 June 1592, arguing that the play must have been written prior to June 1592 for it to have given rise to A Shrew. She cites the reference to "Simon" in A Shrew, Anthony Chute's allusion to The Shrew in Beauty Dishonoured and the verbal similarities between The Shrew and A Knack to Know a Knave as supporting a date of composition prior to June 1592. Stephen Roy Miller, in his 1998 edition of A Shrew for the New Cambridge Shakespeare, agrees with the date of late 1591/early 1592, as he believes The Shrew preceded A Shrew (although he rejects the reported text theory in favour of an adaptation/rewrite theory). In William Shakespeare: A Textual Companion Gary Taylor argues for a date of composition around 1590–1591, noting much of the same evidence cited by other scholars but acknowledging the difficulty of dating the play with certainty.

Keir Elam, however, has argued for a terminus post quem of 1591 for The Shrew, based on Shakespeare's probable use of two sources published that year: Abraham Ortelius' map of Italy in the fourth edition of Theatrum Orbis Terrarum, and John Florio's Second Fruits. Firstly, Shakespeare errs in putting Padua in Lombardy instead of Veneto, probably because he used Ortelius' map of Italy as a source, which has "Lombardy" written across the entirety of northern Italy. Secondly, Elam suggests that Shakespeare derived his Italian idioms and some of the dialogue from Florio's Second Fruits, a bilingual introduction to Italian language and culture. Elam argues that Lucentio's opening dialogue,

Tranio, since for the great desire I had
To see fair Padua, nursery of arts,
I am arrived for fruitful Lombardy,
The pleasant garden of great Italy.
(1.1.1–4)

is an example of Shakespeare's borrowing from Florio's dialogue between Peter and Stephan, who have just arrived in the north:

PETER
I purpose to stay a while, to view the fair Cities of Lombardy.

STEPHAN
Lombardy is the garden of the world.

Elam's arguments suggest The Shrew must have been written no earlier than 1591, which places the date of composition around 1591–1592.

=== Text ===
The 1594 quarto of A Shrew was printed by Peter Short for Cuthbert Burbie. It was republished in 1596 (again by Short for Burbie), and 1607 by Valentine Simmes for Nicholas Ling. The Shrew was not published until the First Folio in 1623. The only quarto version of The Shrew was printed by William Stansby for John Smethwick in 1631 as A Wittie and Pleasant comedie called The Taming of the Shrew, based on the 1623 folio text. W.W. Greg has demonstrated that A Shrew and The Shrew were treated as the same text for the purposes of copyright, i.e. ownership of one constituted ownership of the other, and when Smethwick purchased the rights from Ling in 1609 to print the play in the First Folio, Ling actually transferred the rights for A Shrew, not The Shrew. This has led Darren Freebury-Jones to contend that Shakespeare's play was originally titled A Shrew but that the Folio compilers altered the title to distinguish it from what he sees as an adaptation.

== Analysis and criticism ==
=== Critical history ===
==== The relationship with A Shrew ====
One of the most fundamental critical debates surrounding The Shrew is its relationship with a separate play, A Shrew. There are five main theories as to the nature of this relationship:

1. The two plays are unrelated other than the fact that they are both based on another play which is now lost. This is the Ur-Shrew theory (in reference to Ur-Hamlet).
2. A Shrew is a reconstructed version of The Shrew; i.e. a bad quarto, an attempt by actors to reconstruct the original play from memory.
3. Shakespeare used the previously existing A Shrew, which he did not write, as a source for The Shrew.
4. Both versions were legitimately written by Shakespeare himself; i.e. A Shrew is an early draft of The Shrew.
5. A Shrew is an adaptation of The Shrew by someone other than Shakespeare.

The exact relationship between The Shrew and A Shrew is uncertain, but many scholars consider The Shrew the original, with A Shrew derived from it; as H.J. Oliver suggests, there are "passages in [A Shrew] [...] that make sense only if one knows the [First Folio] version from which they must have been derived."

The debate regarding the relationship between the two plays began in 1725, when Alexander Pope incorporated extracts from A Shrew into The Shrew in his edition of Shakespeare's works. In The Shrew, the Christopher Sly framework is only featured twice; at the opening of the play, and at the end of Act 1, Scene 1. However, in A Shrew, the Sly framework reappears a further five times, including a scene which comes after the final scene of the Petruchio/Katherina story. Pope added most of the Sly framework to The Shrew, even though he acknowledged in his preface that he did not believe Shakespeare had written A Shrew. Subsequent editors followed suit, adding some or all of the Sly framework to their versions of The Shrew; Lewis Theobald (1733), Thomas Hanmer (1744), William Warburton (1747), Samuel Johnson and George Steevens (1765) and Edward Capell (1768). In his 1790 edition of The Plays and Poems of William Shakespeare, however, Edmond Malone removed all A Shrew extracts and returned the text to the 1623 First Folio version. By the end of the eighteenth century, the predominant theory had come to be that A Shrew was a non-Shakespearean source for The Shrew, and hence to include extracts from it was to graft non-authorial material onto the play.

This theory prevailed until 1850 when Samuel Hickson compared the texts of The Shrew and A Shrew, concluding The Shrew was the original, and A Shrew was derived from it. By comparing seven passages which are similar in both plays, he concluded "the original conception is invariably to be found" in The Shrew. His explanation was that A Shrew was written by Christopher Marlowe, with The Shrew as his template. He reached this conclusion primarily because A Shrew features numerous lines almost identical to lines in Marlowe's Tamburlaine and Dr. Faustus.

In 1926, building on Hickson's research, Peter Alexander first suggested the bad quarto theory. Alexander agreed with Hickson that A Shrew was derived from The Shrew, but he did not agree that Marlowe wrote A Shrew. Instead, he labelled A Shrew a bad quarto. His main argument was that, primarily in the subplot of A Shrew, characters act without motivation, whereas such motivation is present in The Shrew. Alexander believed this represents an example of a "reporter" forgetting details and becoming confused, which also explains why lines from other plays are used from time to time; to cover gaps which the reporter knows have been left. He also argued the subplot in The Shrew was closer to the plot of I Suppositi ("The Substitutes" or "The Pretenders") than the subplot in A Shrew, which he felt indicated the subplot in The Shrew must have been based directly on the source, whereas the subplot in A Shrew was a step removed. In their 1928 edition of the play for the New Shakespeare, Arthur Quiller-Couch and John Dover Wilson supported Alexander's argument. However, there has always been critical resistance to the theory.

An early scholar to find fault with Alexander's reasoning was E.K. Chambers, who reasserted the source theory. Chambers, who supported Alexander's bad quarto theory regarding The First part of the Contention betwixt the two famous Houses of Yorke and Lancaster and The True Tragedy of Richard Duke of Yorke, argued A Shrew did not fit the pattern of a bad quarto; "I am quite unable to believe that A Shrew had any such origin. Its textual relation to The Shrew does not bear any analogy to that of other 'bad Quartos' to the legitimate texts from which they were memorised. The nomenclature, which at least a memoriser can recall, is entirely different. The verbal parallels are limited to stray phrases, most frequent in the main plot, for which I believe Shakespeare picked them up from A Shrew." He explained the relationship between I Suppositi/Supposes and the subplots by arguing the subplot in The Shrew was based upon both the subplot in A Shrew and the original version of the story in Ariosto/Gascoigne.

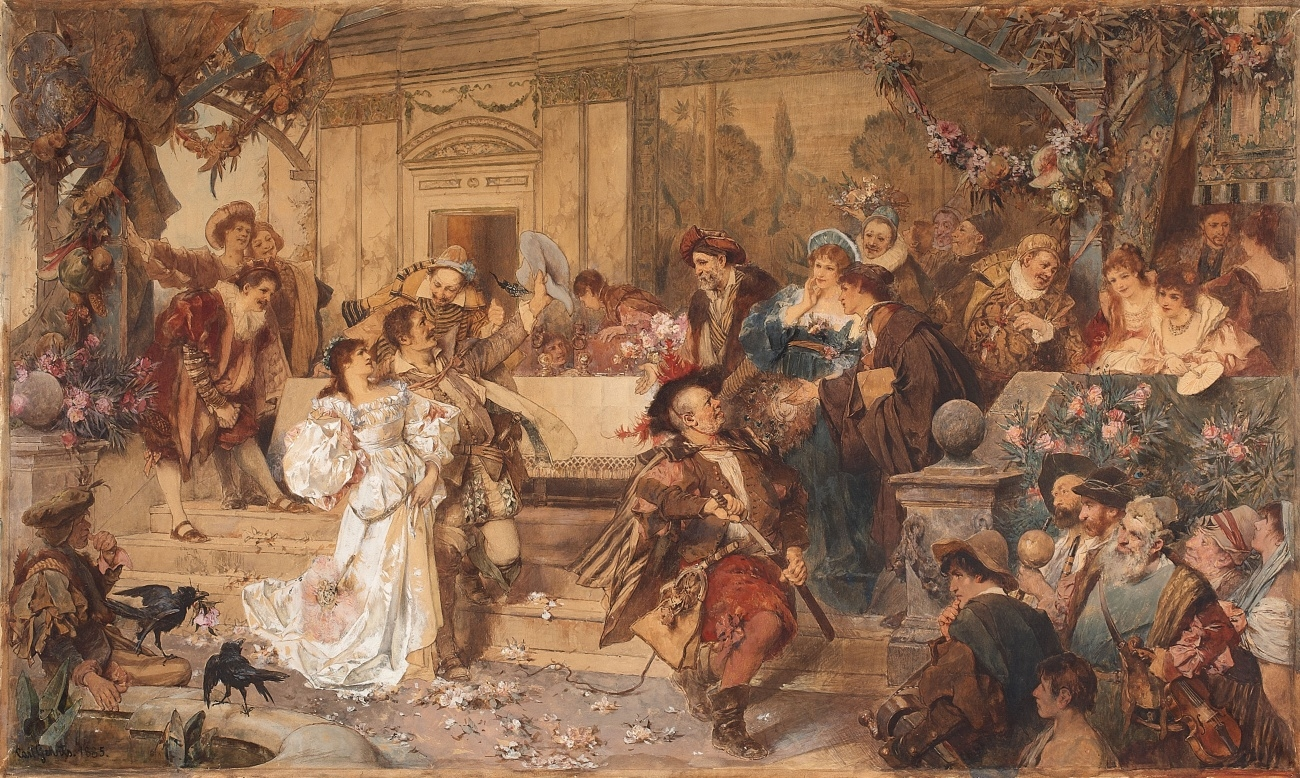
Petruccio's hochzeit by Carl Gehrts (1885)

In 1938, Leo Kirschbaum made a similar argument. In an article listing over twenty examples of bad quartos, Kirschbaum did not include A Shrew, which he felt was too different from The Shrew to come under the bad quarto banner; "despite protestations to the contrary, The Taming of a Shrew does not stand in relation to The Shrew as The True Tragedie, for example, stands in relation to 3 Henry VI." Writing in 1998, Stephen Roy Miller offers much the same opinion; "the relation of the early quarto to the Folio text is unlike other early quartos because the texts vary much more in plotting and dialogue [...] the differences between the texts are substantial and coherent enough to establish that there was deliberate revision in producing one text out of the other; hence A Shrew is not merely a poor report (or 'bad quarto') of The Shrew." Character names are changed, basic plot points are altered (Kate has two sisters for example, not one), the play is set in Athens instead of Padua, the Sly framework forms a complete narrative, and entire speeches are completely different, all of which suggests to Miller that the author of A Shrew thought they were working on something different from Shakespeare's play, not attempting to transcribe it for resale; "underpinning the notion of a 'Shakespearean bad quarto' is the assumption that the motive of whoever compiled that text was to produce, differentially, a verbal replica of what appeared on stage." Miller believes that Chambers and Kirschbaum successfully illustrate A Shrew does not fulfil this rubric.

Alexander's theory continued to be challenged as the years went on. In 1942, R.A. Houk developed what came to be dubbed the Ur-Shrew theory; both A Shrew and The Shrew were based upon a third play, now lost. In 1943, G.I. Duthie refined Houk's suggestion by arguing A Shrew was a memorial reconstruction of Ur-Shrew, a now lost early draft of The Shrew; "A Shrew is substantially a memorially constructed text and is dependent upon an early Shrew play, now lost. The Shrew is a reworking of this lost play." Hickson, who believed Marlowe to have written A Shrew, had hinted at this theory in 1850; "though I do not believe Shakspeare's play to contain a line of any other writer, I think it extremely probable that we have it only in a revised form, and that, consequently, the play which Marlowe imitated might not necessarily have been that fund of life and humour that we find it now." Hickson is here arguing that Marlowe's A Shrew is not based upon the version of The Shrew found in the First Folio, but on another version of the play. Duthie argues this other version was a Shakespearean early draft of The Shrew; A Shrew constitutes a reported text of a now lost early draft.

Alexander returned to the debate in 1969, re-presenting his bad quarto theory. In particular, he concentrated on the various complications and inconsistencies in the subplot of A Shrew, which had been used by Houk and Duthie as evidence for an Ur-Shrew, to argue that the reporter of A Shrew attempted to recreate the complex subplot from The Shrew but got confused; "the compiler of A Shrew while trying to follow the subplot of The Shrew gave it up as too complicated to reproduce, and fell back on love scenes in which he substituted for the maneuvers of the disguised Lucentio and Hortensio extracts from Tamburlaine and Faustus, with which the lovers woo their ladies."

After little further discussion of the issue in the 1970s, the 1980s saw the publication of three scholarly editions of The Shrew, all of which re-addressed the question of the relationship between the two plays; Brian Morris' 1981 edition for the second series of the Arden Shakespeare, H.J. Oliver's 1982 edition for the Oxford Shakespeare and Ann Thompson's 1984 edition for the New Cambridge Shakespeare. Morris summarised the scholarly position in 1981 as one in which no clear-cut answers could be found; "unless new, external evidence comes to light, the relationship between The Shrew and A Shrew can never be decided beyond a peradventure. It will always be a balance of probabilities, shifting as new arguments and opinions are added to the scales. Nevertheless, in the present century, the movement has unquestionably been towards an acceptance of the Bad Quarto theory, and this can now be accepted as at least the current orthodoxy." Morris himself, and Thompson, supported the bad quarto theory, with Oliver tentatively arguing for Duthie's bad quarto/early draft/Ur-Shrew theory.

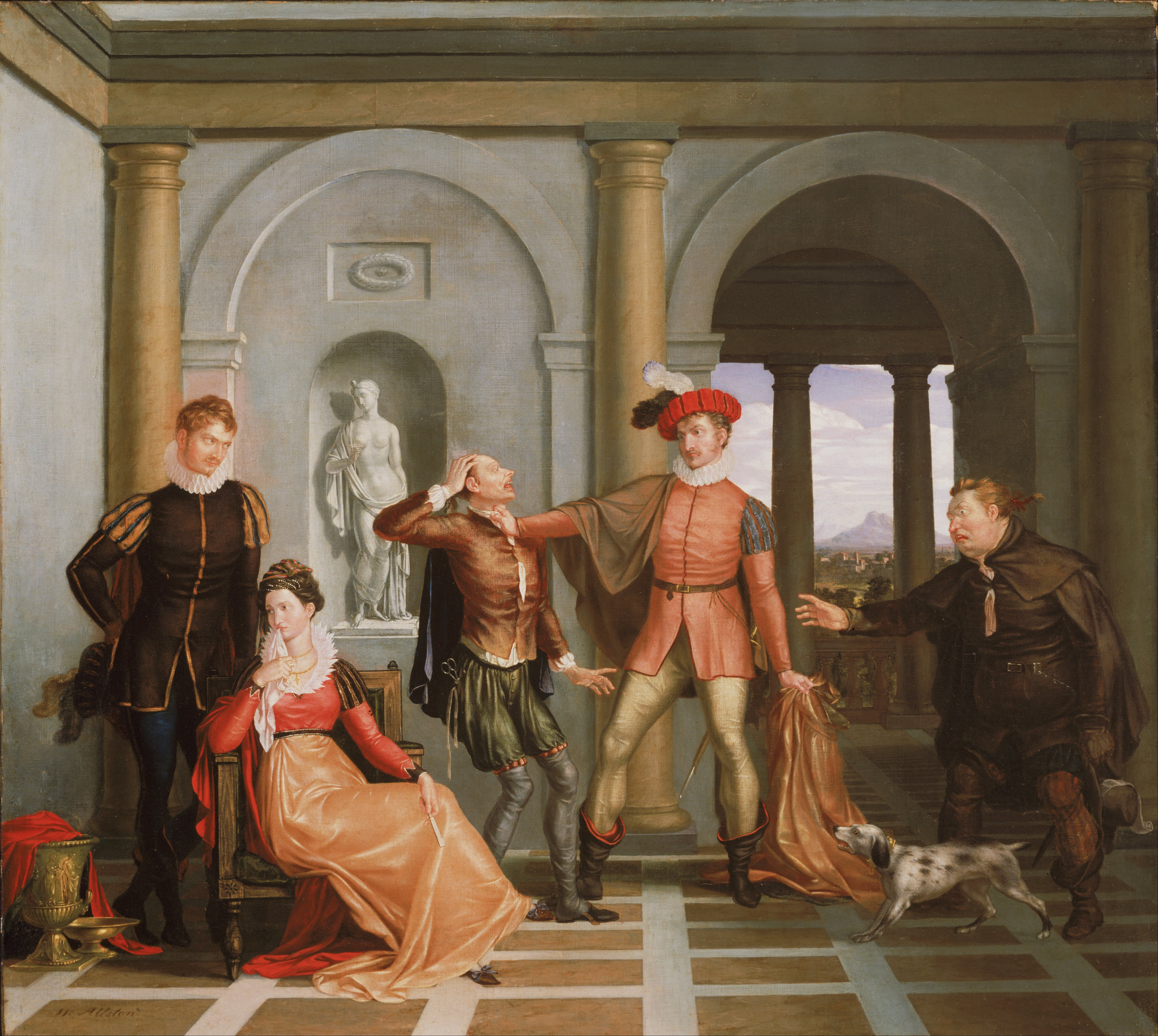
Scene from Shakespeare's The Taming of the Shrew by Washington Allston (1809)

Perhaps the most extensive examination of the question came in 1998 in Stephen Roy Miller's edition of A Shrew for the New Cambridge Shakespeare: The Early Quartos series. Miller agrees with most modern scholars that A Shrew is derived from The Shrew, but he does not believe it to be a bad quarto. Instead, he argues it is an adaptation by someone other than Shakespeare. Miller believes Alexander's suggestion in 1969 that the reporter became confused is unlikely, and instead suggests an adapter at work; "the most economic explanation of indebtedness is that whoever compiled A Shrew borrowed the lines from Shakespeare's The Shrew, or a version of it, and adapted them." Part of Miller's evidence relates to Gremio, who has no counterpart in A Shrew. In The Shrew, after the wedding, Gremio expresses doubts as to whether or not Petruchio will be able to tame Katherina. In A Shrew, these lines are extended and split between Polidor (the equivalent of Hortensio) and Phylema (Bianca). As Gremio does have a counterpart in I Suppositi, Miller concludes that "to argue the priority of A Shrew in this case would mean arguing that Shakespeare took the negative hints from the speeches of Polidor and Phylema and gave them to a character he resurrected from Supposes. This is a less economical argument than to suggest that the compiler of A Shrew, dismissing Gremio, simply shared his doubts among the characters available." He argues there is even evidence in the play that the compiler knew he was working within a specific literary tradition; "as with his partial change of character names, the compiler seems to wish to produce dialogue much like his models, but not the same. For him, adaptation includes exact quotation, imitation and incorporation of his own additions. This seems to define his personal style, and his aim seems to be to produce his own version, presumably intended that it should be tuned more towards the popular era than The Shrew."

As had Alexander, Houk and Duthie, Miller believes the key to the debate is to be found in the subplot, as it is here where the two plays differ most. He points out that the subplot in The Shrew is based on "the classical style of Latin comedy with an intricate plot involving deception, often kept in motion by a comic servant." The subplot in A Shrew, however, which features an extra sister and addresses the issue of marrying above and below one's class, "has many elements more associated with the romantic style of comedy popular in London in the 1590s." Miller cites plays such as Robert Greene's Friar Bacon and Friar Bungay and Fair Em as evidence of the popularity of such plays. He points to the fact that in The Shrew, there are only eleven lines of romance between Lucentio and Bianca, but in A Shrew, there is an entire scene between Kate's two sisters and their lovers. This, he argues, is evidence of an adaptation rather than a faulty report;

while it is difficult to know the motivation of the adapter, we can reckon that from his point of view an early staging of The Shrew might have revealed an overly wrought play from a writer trying to establish himself but challenging too far the current ideas of popular comedy. The Shrew is long and complicated. It has three plots, the subplots being in the swift Latin or Italianate style with several disguises. Its language is at first stuffed with difficult Italian quotations, but its dialogue must often sound plain when compared to Marlowe's thunder or Greene's romance, the mouth-filling lines and images that on other afternoons were drawing crowds. An adapter might well have seen his role as that of a 'play doctor' improving The Shrew – while cutting it – by stuffing it with the sort of material currently in demand in popular romantic comedies.

Miller believes the compiler "appears to have wished to make the play shorter, more of a romantic comedy full of wooing and glamorous rhetoric, and to add more obvious, broad comedy."

==== Hortensio problem ====
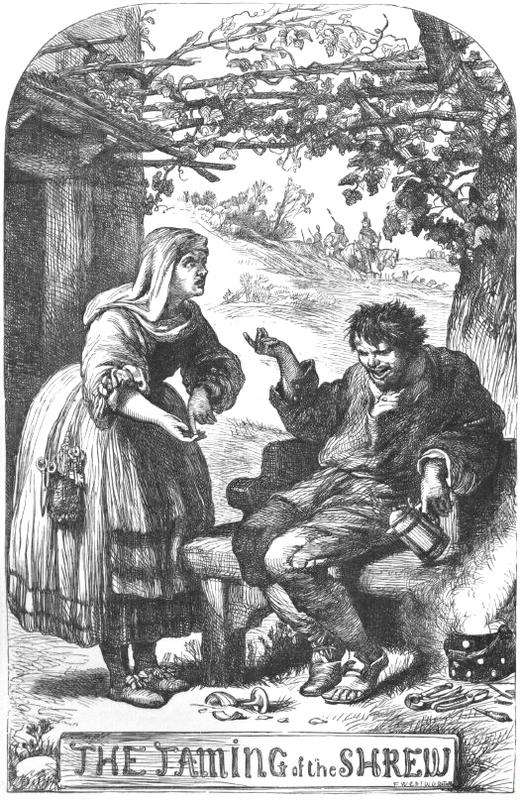
H.C. Selous' illustration of Sly and the Hostess; from The Plays of William Shakespeare: The Comedies, edited by Charles Cowden Clarke and Mary Cowden Clarke (1830)

H.J. Oliver argues the version of the play in the 1623 First Folio was likely copied not from a prompt book or transcript, but from the author's own foul papers, which he believes showed signs of revision by Shakespeare. These revisions, Oliver says, relate primarily to the character of Hortensio, and suggest that in an original version of the play, now lost, Hortensio was not a suitor to Bianca, but simply an old friend of Petruchio. When Shakespeare rewrote the play so that Hortensio became a suitor in disguise (Litio), many of his lines were either omitted or given to Tranio (disguised as Lucentio).

Oliver cites several scenes in the play where Hortensio (or his absence) causes problems. For example, in Act 2, Scene 1, Tranio (as Lucentio) and Gremio bid for Bianca, but Hortensio, who everyone is aware is also a suitor, is never mentioned. In Act 3, Scene 1, Lucentio (as Cambio) tells Bianca "we might beguile the old Pantalowne" (l.36), yet says nothing of Hortensio's attempts to woo her, instead implying his only rival is Gremio. In Act 3, Scene 2, Tranio suddenly becomes an old friend of Petruchio, knowing his mannerisms and explaining his tardiness prior to the wedding. However, up to this point, Petruchio's only acquaintance in Padua has been Hortensio. In Act 4, Scene 3, Hortensio tells Vincentio that Lucentio has married Bianca. However, as far as Hortensio should be concerned, Lucentio has denounced Bianca, because in Act 4, Scene 2, Tranio (disguised as Lucentio) agreed with Hortensio that neither of them would pursue Bianca, and as such, his knowledge of the marriage of who he supposes to be Lucentio and Bianca makes little sense. From this, Oliver concludes that an original version of the play existed in which Hortensio was simply a friend of Petruchio's, and had no involvement in the Bianca subplot, but wishing to complicate things, Shakespeare rewrote the play, introducing the Litio disguise, and giving some of Hortensio's discarded lines to Tranio, but not fully correcting everything to fit the presence of a new suitor.

This is important in Duthie's theory of an Ur-Shrew insofar as he argues it is the original version of The Shrew upon which A Shrew is based, not the version which appears in the 1623 First Folio. As Oliver argues, "A Shrew is a report of an earlier, Shakespearian, form of The Shrew in which Hortensio was not disguised as Litio." Oliver suggests that when Pembroke's Men left London in June 1592, they had in their possession a now-lost early draft of the play. Upon returning to London, they published A Shrew in 1594, sometime after which Shakespeare rewrote his original play into the form seen in the First Folio.

Duthie's arguments were never fully accepted at the time, as critics tended to look at the relationship between the two plays as an either-or situation; A Shrew is either a reported text or an early draft. In more recent scholarship, however, the possibility that a text could be both has been shown to be critically viable. For example, in his 2003 Oxford Shakespeare edition of 2 Henry VI, Roger Warren makes the same argument for The First Part of the Contention. Randall Martin reaches the same conclusion regarding The True Tragedy of Richard Duke of Yorke in his 2001 Oxford Shakespeare edition of 3 Henry VI. This lends support to the theory that A Shrew could be both a reported text and an early draft.

==== Sexism controversy ====
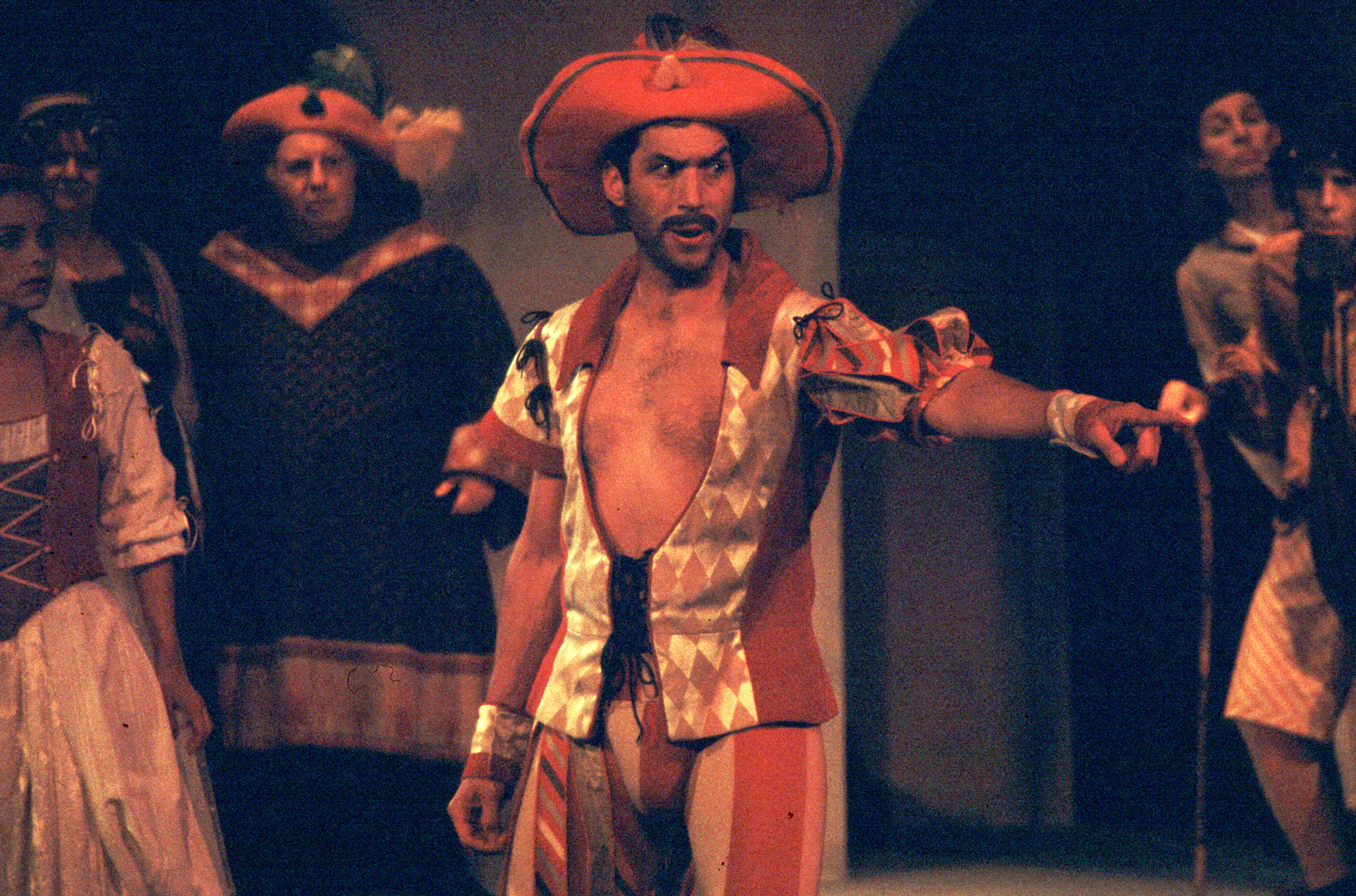
Kevin Black in his "wedding outfit" in the 2003 Carmel Shakespeare Festival production

The Taming of the Shrew has been the subject of critical controversy. Dana Aspinall writes "Since its first appearance, some time between 1588 and 1594, Shrew has elicited a panoply of heartily supportive, ethically uneasy, or altogether disgusted responses to its rough-and-tumble treatment of the 'taming' of the 'curst shrew' Katherina, and obviously, of all potentially unruly wives." Phyllis Rackin argues that "seen in the context of current anxieties, desires and beliefs, Shakespeare's play seems to prefigure the most oppressive modern assumptions about women and to validate those assumptions as timeless truths." Stevie Davies says that responses to Shrew have been "dominated by feelings of unease and embarrassment, accompanied by the desire to prove that Shakespeare cannot have meant what he seems to be saying; and that therefore he cannot really be saying it." Philippa Kelly asks:

Do we simply add our voices to those of critical disapproval, seeing Shrew as at best an "early Shakespeare", the socially provocative effort of a dramatist who was learning to flex his muscles? Or as an item of social archaeology that we have long ago abandoned? Or do we "rescue" it from offensive male smugness? Or make an appeal to the slippery category of "irony"?

Some scholars argue that even in Shakespeare's day the play must have been controversial, due to the changing nature of gender politics. Marjorie Garber, for example, suggests Shakespeare created the Induction so the audience would not react badly to the misogyny in the Petruchio/Katherina story; he was, in effect, defending himself against charges of sexism. G.R. Hibbard argues that during the period in which the play was written, arranged marriages were beginning to give way to newer, more romantically informed unions, and thus people's views on women's position in society, and their relationships with men, were in a state of flux. As such, audiences may not have been as predisposed to tolerate the harsh treatment of Katherina as is often thought.

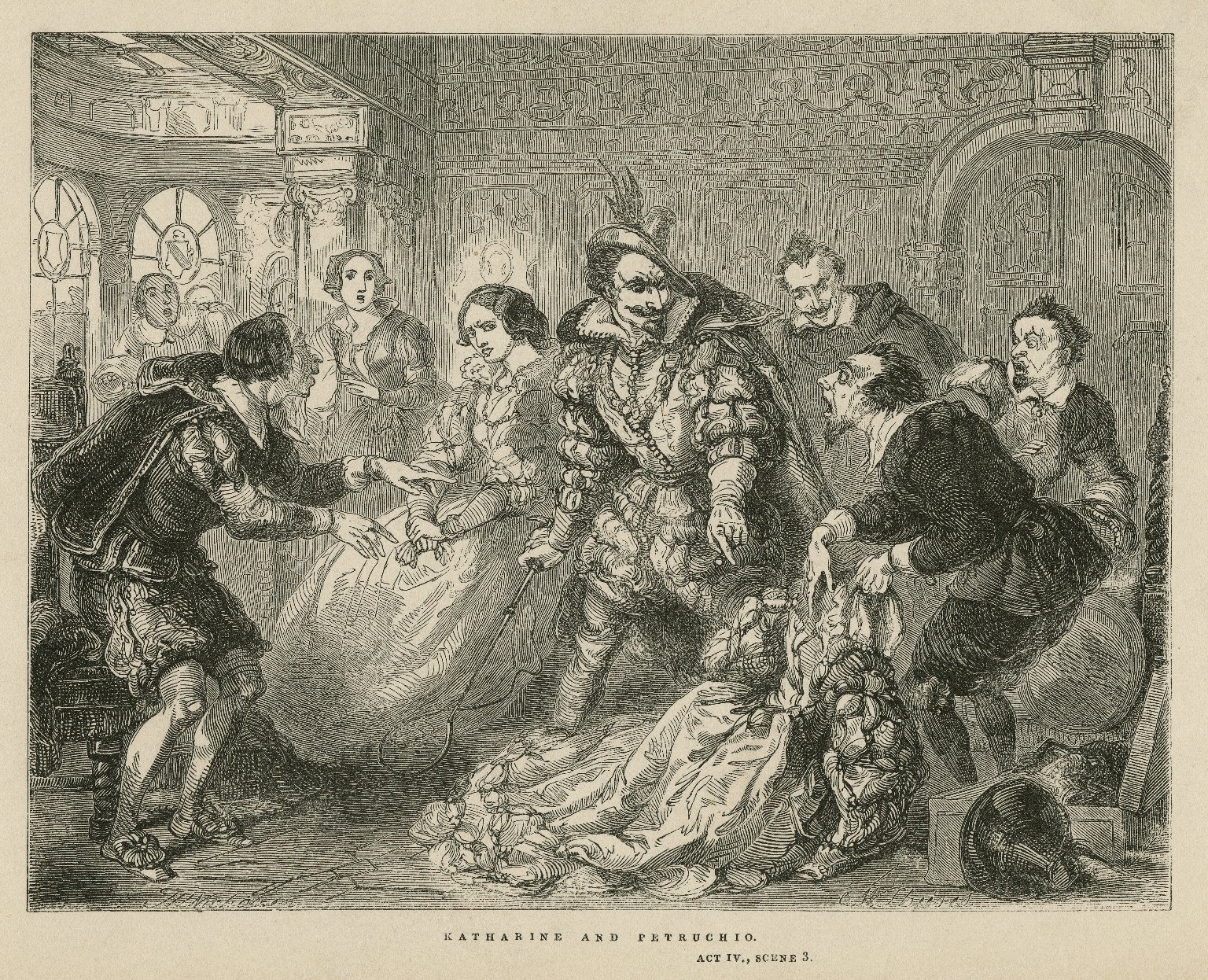
Mid-19th century print of Act 4, Scene 3 (Petruchio rejects the tailor's gowns for Katherina)

Evidence of at least some initial societal discomfort with The Shrew is, perhaps, to be found in the fact that John Fletcher, Shakespeare's successor as house playwright for the King's Men, wrote The Woman's Prize, or The Tamer Tamed as a sequel to Shakespeare's play. Written c.1611, the play tells the story of Petruchio's remarriage after Katherina's death. In a mirror of the original, his new wife attempts (successfully) to tame him – thus the tamer becomes the tamed. Although Fletcher's sequel is often downplayed as merely a farce, some critics acknowledge the more serious implications of such a reaction. Lynda Boose, for example, writes, "Fletcher's response may in itself reflect the kind of discomfort that Shrew has characteristically provoked in men and why its many revisions since 1594 have repeatedly contrived ways of softening the edges."

With the rise of the feminist movement in the twentieth century, reactions to the play have tended to become more divergent. For some critics, "Kate's taming was no longer as funny as it had been [...] her domination became, in George Bernard Shaw's words 'altogether disgusting to modern sensibility'." Addressing the relationship between A Shrew and The Shrew from a political perspective, for example, Leah S. Marcus very much believes the play to be what it seems. She argues A Shrew is an earlier version of The Shrew, but acknowledges that most scholars reject the idea that A Shrew was written by Shakespeare. She believes one of the reasons for this is because A Shrew "hedges the play's patriarchal message with numerous qualifiers that do not exist in" The Shrew. She calls A Shrew a more "progressive" text than The Shrew, and argues that scholars tend to dismiss the idea that A Shrew is Shakespearean because "the women are not as satisfactorily tamed as they are in The Shrew." She also points out that if A Shrew is an early draft, it suggests Shakespeare "may have increased rather than decreased the patriarchal violence of his materials", something which, she believes, scholars find difficult to accept.

However, others see the play as preceding 20th century feminist condemnation of patriarchal domination, and as an argument for the liberation of women. For example, Conall Morrison, director of the RSC's 2008 production, wrote:

I find it gobsmacking that some people see the play as misogynistic. I believe that it is a moral tale. I believe that it is saying – "do not be like this" and "do not do this." "These people are objectionable." By the time you get to the last scene all of the men – including her father are saying – it's amazing how you crushed that person. It's amazing how you lobotomised her. And they're betting on the women as though they are dogs in a race or horses. It's reduced to that. And it's all about money and the level of power. Have you managed to crush Katharina or for Hortensio and Lucentio, will you be able to control Bianca and the widow? Will you similarly be able to control your proto-shrews? It is so self-evidently repellent that I don't believe for a second that Shakespeare is espousing this. And I don't believe for a second that the man who would be interested in Benedict and Cleopatra and Romeo and Juliet and all these strong lovers would have some misogynist aberration. It's very obviously a satire on this male behaviour and a cautionary tale [...] That's not how he views women and relationships, as demonstrated by the rest of the plays. This is him investigating misogyny, exploring it and animating it and obviously damning it because none of the men come out smelling of roses. When the chips are down they all default to power positions and self-protection and status and the one woman who was a challenge to them, with all with her wit and intellect, they are all gleeful and relieved to see crushed.

Philippa Kelly makes this point:

Petruchio's "taming" of Kate, harsh though it may be, is a far cry from the fiercely repressive measures going on outside the theatre, and presumably endorsed by much of its audience. Some critics argue that in mitigating the violence both of folktales and of actual practices, Shakespeare sets up Petruchio as a ruffian and a bully, but only as a disguise – and a disguise that implicitly criticises the brutal arrogance of conventional male attitudes.

Jonathan Miller, director of the 1980 BBC Television Shakespeare adaptation, and several theatrical productions, argues that although the play is not misogynistic, neither is it a feminist treatise:

I think it's an irresponsible and silly thing to make that play into a feminist tract: to use it as a way of proving that women have been dishonoured and hammered flat by male chauvinism. There's another, more complex way of reading it than that: which sees it as being their particular view of how society ought to be organised in order to restore order in a fallen world. Now, we don't happen to think that we are inheritors of the sin of Adam and that orderliness can only be preserved by deputing power to magistrates and sovereigns, fathers and husbands. But the fact that they did think like that is absolutely undeniable, so productions which really do try to deny that, and try to hijack the work to make it address current problems about women's place in society, become boring, thin and tractarian.

==== Induction ====
An element in the debate regarding the play's misogyny, or lack thereof, is the Induction, and how it relates to the Katherina/Petruchio story. According to H.J. Oliver, "it has become orthodoxy to claim to find in the Induction the same 'theme' as is to be found in both the Bianca and the Katherine-Petruchio plots of the main play, and to take it for granted that identity of theme is a merit and 'justifies' the introduction of Sly." For example, Geoffrey Bullough argues the three plots "are all linked in idea because all contain discussion of the relations of the sexes in marriage." Richard Hosley suggests the three plots form a unified whole insofar as they all deal with "assumptions about identity and assumptions about personality." Oliver, however, argues that "the Sly Induction does not so much announce the theme of the enclosed stories as establish their tone."

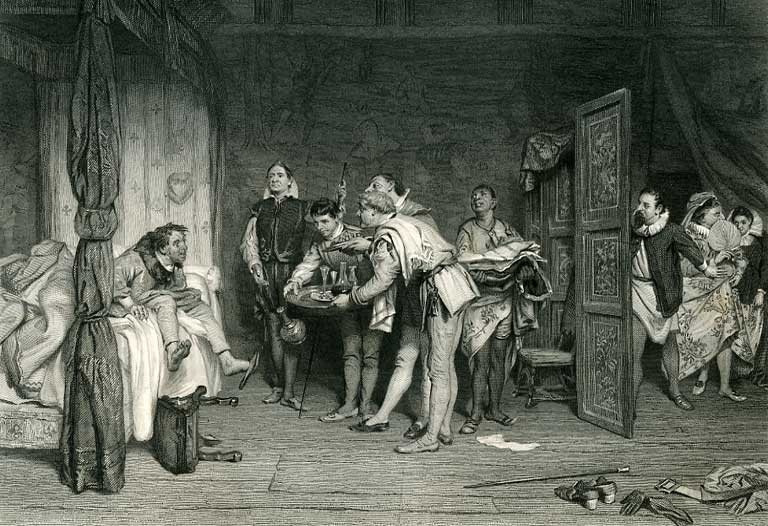
William Quiller Orchardson's illustration of Sly and the Lord, engraved by Charles William Sharpe; from the Imperial Edition of The Works of Shakespere, edited by Charles Knight (1876)

This is important in terms of determining the seriousness of Katherina's final speech. Marjorie Garber writes of the Induction, "the frame performs the important task of distancing the later action, and of insuring a lightness of tone – significant in light of the real abuse to which Kate is subjected by Petruchio." Oliver argues that Induction is used to remove the audience from the world of the enclosed plot – to place the Sly story on the same level of reality as the audience, and the Katherina/Petruchio story on a different level of reality. This, he argues, is done to ensure the audience does not take the play literally, that it sees the Katherina/Petruchio story as a farce:

the phenomenon of theatrical illusion is itself being laughed at; and the play within the play makes Sly drowsy and probably soon sends him to sleep. Are we to let that play preach morality to us or look in it for social or intellectual substance? The drunken tinker may be believed in as one believes in any realistically presented character; but we cannot 'believe' in something that is not even mildly interesting to him. The play within the play has been presented only after all the preliminaries have encouraged us to take it as a farce.

Oliver argues that "the main purpose of the Induction was to set the tone for the play within the play – in particular, to present the story of Kate and her sister as none-too-serious comedy put on to divert a drunken tinker". He suggests that if the Induction is removed from a production of the play (as it very often is), a fundamental part of the structure has been lost. Speaking of Jonathan Miller's BBC Television Shakespeare adaptation of 1980, which omitted the Induction, Stanley Wells wrote "to omit the Christopher Sly episodes is to suppress one of Shakespeare's most volatile lesser characters, to jettison most of the play's best poetry, and to strip it of an entire dramatic dimension."

Regarding the importance of the Induction, Jonathan Bate and Eric Rasmussen argue that "the Sly framework establishes a self-referential theatricality in which the status of the shrew-play as a play is enforced." Graham Holderness argues "the play in its received entirety does not propose any simple or unitary view of sexual politics: it contains a crudely reactionary dogma of masculine supremacy, but it also works on that ideology to force its expression into self-contradiction. The means by which this self-interrogation is accomplished is that complex theatrical device of the Sly-framework [...] without the metadramatic potentialities of the Sly-framework, any production of Shrew is thrown much more passively at the mercy of the director's artistic and political ideology." Coppélia Kahn suggests "the transformation of Christopher Sly from drunken lout to noble lord, a transformation only temporary and skin-deep, suggests that Kate's switch from independence may also be deceptive and prepares us for the irony of the dénouement." The Induction serves to undercut charges of misogyny – the play within the play is a farce, it is not supposed to be taken seriously by the audience, as it is not taken seriously by Sly. As such, questions of the seriousness of what happens within it are rendered irrelevant.

=== Language ===
Language itself is a major theme in the play, especially in the taming process, where mastery of language becomes paramount. Katherina is initially described as a shrew because of her harsh language to those around her. Karen Newman points out, "from the outset of the play, Katherine's threat to male authority is posed through language: it is perceived by others as such and is linked to a claim larger than shrewishness–witchcraft–through the constant allusions to Katherine's kinship with the devil." For example, after Katherina rebukes Hortensio and Gremio in Act 1, Scene 1, Hortensio replies with "From all such devils, good Lord deliver us!" (l.66). Even Katherina's own father refers to her as "thou hilding of a devilish spirit" (2.1.26). Petruchio, however, attempts to tame her – and thus her language – with rhetoric that specifically undermines her tempestuous nature;

Say that she rail, why then I'll tell her plain
She sings as sweetly as a nightingale.
Say that she frown, I'll say that she looks as clear
As morning roses newly washed with dew.
Say she be mute and will not speak a word,
Then I'll commend her volubility
And say she uttereth piercing eloquence.
If she do bid me pack, I'll give her thanks,
As though she bid me stay by her a week.
If she deny to wed, I'll crave the day
When I shall ask the banns, and when be marrièd.
(2.1.169–179)

Here Petruchio is specifically attacking the very function of Katherina's language, vowing that no matter what she says, he will purposely misinterpret it, thus undermining the basis of the linguistic sign, and disrupting the relationship between signifier and signified. In this sense, Margaret Jane Kidnie argues this scene demonstrates the "slipperiness of language."

Apart from undermining her language, Petruchio also uses language to objectify her. For example, in Act 3, Scene 2, Petruchio explains to all present that Katherina is now literally his property:

She is my goods, my chattels, she is my house,
My household stuff, my field, my barn,
My horse, my ox, my ass, my any thing.
(ll.232–234)

In discussing Petruchio's objectification of Katherina, Tita French Baumlin focuses on his puns on her name. By referring to her as a "cake" and a "cat" (2.1.185–195), he objectifies her in a more subtle manner than saying she belongs to him. A further aspect of Petruchio's taming rhetoric is the repeated comparison of Katherina to animals. In particular, he is prone to comparing her to a hawk (2.1.8 and 4.1.177–183), often employing an overarching hunting metaphor; "My falcon now is sharp and passing empty,/And till she stoop she must not be full-gorged" (4.1.177–178). Katherina, however, appropriates this method herself, leading to a trading of insults rife with animal imagery in Act 2, Scene 1 (ll.207–232), where she compares Petruchio to a turtle and a crab.

Language itself has thus become a battleground. However, it is Petruchio who seemingly emerges as the victor. In his house, after Petruchio has dismissed the haberdasher, Katherina exclaims

Why sir, I trust I may have leave to speak,
And speak I will. I am no child, no babe;
Your betters have endured me say my mind,
And if you cannot, best you stop your ears.
My tongue will tell the anger of my heart,
Or else my heart concealing it will break,
And rather than it shall, I will be free
Even to the uttermost, as I please, in words.
(4.3.74–80)

Katherina is here declaring her independence of language; no matter what Petruchio may do, she will always be free to speak her mind. However, only one hundred lines later, the following exchange occurs;

PETRUCHIO
Let's see, I think 'tis now some seven o'clock.
And well we may come there by dinner-time.

KATHERINA
I dare assure you, sir, 'tis almost two,
And 'twill be supper-time ere you come there.

PETRUCHIO
It shall be seven ere I go to horse.
Look what I speak, or do, or think to do,
You are still crossing it. Sirs, let't alone,
I will not go today; and ere I do,
It shall be what o'clock I say it is.
(4.3.184–192)

Kidnie says of this scene, "the language game has suddenly changed and the stakes have been raised. Whereas before he seemed to mishear or misunderstand her words, Petruchio now overtly tests his wife's subjection by demanding that she concede to his views even when they are demonstrably unreasonable. The lesson is that Petruchio has the absolute authority to rename their world." Katherina is free to say whatever she wishes, as long she agrees with Petruchio. His apparent victory in the 'language game' is seen in Act 4, Scene 5, when Katherina is made to switch the words "moon" and "sun", and she concedes that she will agree with whatever Petruchio says, no matter how absurd:

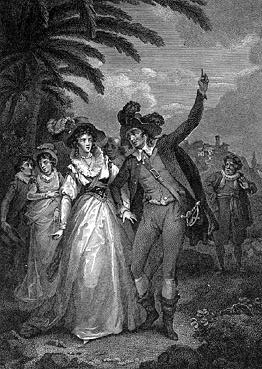
Julius Caesar Ibbetson illustration of Act 4, Scene 5 (the "sun and moon" conversation) from The Boydell Shakespeare Prints; engraved by Isaac Taylor (1803)

And be it the moon, or sun, or what you please;
And if you please to call it a rush-candle,
Henceforth I vow it shall be so for me
...
But sun it is not, when you say it is not,
And the moon changes even as your mind:
What you will have it named, even that it is,
And so it shall be so for Katherine.
(ll.12–15; ll.19–22)

Of this scene, Kidnie argues "what he 'says' must take priority over what Katherina 'knows'." From this point, Katherina's language changes from her earlier vernacular; instead of defying Petruchio and his words, she has apparently succumbed to his rhetoric and accepted that she will use his language instead of her own – both Katherina and her language have, seemingly, been tamed.

The important role of language, however, is not confined to the taming plot. For example, in a psychoanalytic reading of the play, Joel Fineman suggests there is a distinction made between male and female language, further subcategorising the latter into good and bad, epitomised by Bianca and Katherina respectively. Language is also important in relation to the Induction. Here, Sly speaks in prose until he begins to accept his new role as lord, at which point he switches to blank verse and adopts the royal we. Language is also important in relation to Tranio and Lucentio, who appear on stage speaking a highly artificial style of blank verse full of classical and mythological allusions and elaborate metaphors and similes, thus immediately setting them aside from the more straightforward language of the Induction, and alerting the audience to the fact that they are now in an entirely different milieu.

== Themes ==
=== Female submissiveness ===
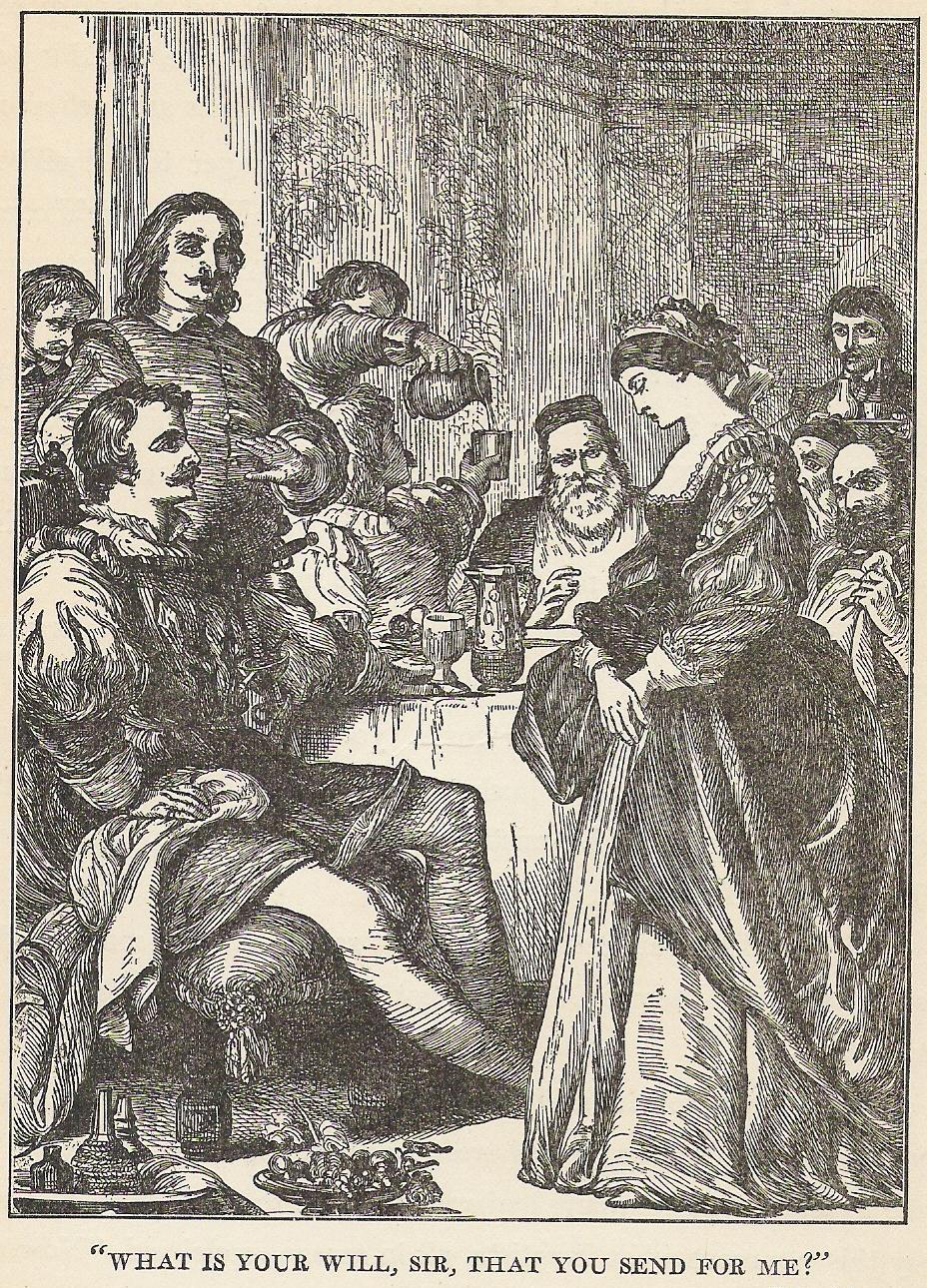
Arthur Rackham illustration of Act 5, Scene 2 (Katherina is the only wife to respond to her husband); from Tales from Shakespeare, edited by Charles Lamb and Mary Lamb (1890)

In productions of the play, it is often the interpretation of Katherina's final speech (the longest speech in the play) that defines the tone of the entire production, such is the importance of this speech and what it says, or seems to say, about female submission:

Fie, fie! unknit that threatening unkind brow,
And dart not scornful glances from those eyes
To wound thy lord, thy king, thy governor.
It blots thy beauty, as frosts do bite the meads,
Confounds thy fame, as whirlwinds shake fair buds,
And in no sense is meet or amiable.
A woman moved is like a fountain troubled,
Muddy, ill-seeming, thick, bereft of beauty,
And while it is so, none so dry or thirsty
Will deign to sip or touch one drop of it.
Thy husband is thy lord, thy life, thy keeper,
Thy head, thy sovereign: one that cares for thee,
And for thy maintenance; commits his body
To painful labour both by sea and land,
To watch the night in storms, the day in cold,
Whilst thou liest warm at home, secure and safe,
And craves no other tribute at thy hands
But love, fair looks, and true obedience –
Too little payment for so great a debt.
Such duty as the subject owes the prince,
Even such a woman oweth to her husband;
And when she is froward, peevish, sullen, sour,
And not obedient to his honest will,
What is she but a foul contending rebel
And graceless traitor to her loving lord?
I am ashamed that women are so simple
To offer war where they should kneel for peace;
Or seek for rule, supremacy, and sway,
When they are bound to serve, love, and obey.
Why are our bodies soft, and weak, and smooth,
Unapt to toil and trouble in the world,
But that our soft conditions, and our hearts,
Should well agree with our external parts?
Come, come, you froward and unable worms!
My mind hath been as big as one of yours,
My heart as great, my reason haply more,
To bandy word for word and frown for frown;
But now I see our lances are but straws,
Our strength as weak, our weakness past compare,
That seeming to be most which we indeed least are.
Then vail your stomachs, for it is no boot,
And place your hands below your husband's foot;
In token of which duty, if he please,
My hand is ready, may it do him ease.
(5.2.136–179)

Traditionally, many critics have taken the speech literally. Writing in 1943, for example, G.I. Duthie argued "what Shakespeare emphasises here is the foolishness of trying to destroy order." However, in a modern western society, holding relatively egalitarian views on gender, such an interpretation presents a dilemma, as according to said interpretation the play seemingly celebrates female subjugation.

Critically, four main theories have emerged in response to Katherina's speech;

1. It is sincere; Petruchio has successfully tamed her.
2. It is sincere, but not because Petruchio has tamed her. Instead, she has fallen in love with him and accepted her role as his wife.
3. It is ironic; she is being sarcastic, pretending to have been tamed when in reality she has completely duped Petruchio into thinking he has tamed her.
4. It should not be read seriously or ironically; it is part of the farcical nature of the play-within-the-play.

George Bernard Shaw wrote in 1897 that "no man with any decency of feeling can sit it out in the company of a woman without being extremely ashamed of the lord-of-creation moral implied in the wager and the speech put into the woman's own mouth." Katherina is seen as having been successfully tamed, and having come to accept her newly submissive role to such an extent that she advocates that role for others, the final speech rationalises, according to Duthie, in both a political and sociological sense, the submission of wives to husbands.

Actress Meryl Streep, who played Katherina in 1978 at the Shakespeare in the Park festival, says of the play, "really what matters is that they have an incredible passion and love; it's not something that Katherina admits to right away, but it does provide the source of her change." Similarly, John C. Bean sees the speech as the final stage in the process of Katherina's change of heart towards Petruchio; "if we can appreciate the liberal element in Kate's last speech – the speech that strikes modern sensibilities as advocating male tyranny – we can perhaps see that Kate is tamed not in the automatic manner of behavioural psychology but in the spontaneous manner of the later romantic comedies where characters lose themselves and emerge, as if from a dream, liberated into the bonds of love."

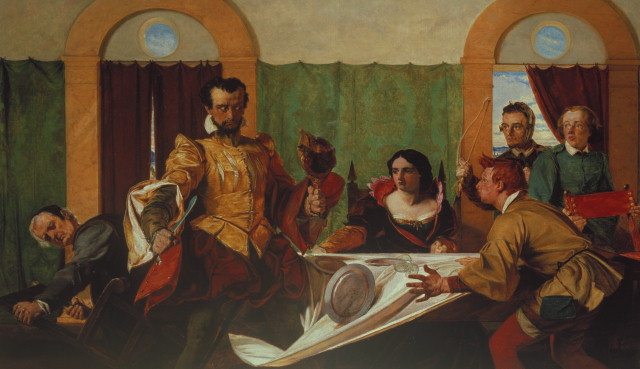
Taming of the Shrew by Augustus Egg (1860)

Perhaps the most common interpretation in the modern era is that the speech is ironic; Katherina has not been tamed at all, she has merely duped Petruchio into thinking she has. Two especially well-known examples of this interpretation are seen in the two major feature film adaptations of the play; Sam Taylor's 1929 version and Franco Zeffirelli's 1967 version. In Taylor's film, Katherina, played by Mary Pickford, winks at Bianca during the speech, indicating she does not mean a word of what she is saying. In Zeffirelli's film, Katherina, played by Elizabeth Taylor, delivers the speech as though it were her own idea, and the submission aspect is reversed by her ending the speech and leaving the room, causing Petruchio to have to run after her. Phyllis Rackin is an example of a scholar who reads the speech ironically, especially in how it deals with gender. She points out that several lines in the speech focus on the woman's body, but in the Elizabethan theatre, the role would have been played by a young boy, thus rendering any evocation of the female form as ironic. Reading the play as a satire of gender roles, she sees the speech as the culmination of this process. Along similar lines, Philippa Kelly says "the body of the boy actor in Shakespeare's time would have created a sexual indeterminacy that would have undermined the patriarchal narrative, so that the taming is only apparently so. And in declaring women's passivity so extensively and performing it centre-stage, Kate might be seen to take on a kind of agency that rebukes the feminine codes of silence and obedience which she so expressly advocates." Similarly, Coppélia Kahn argues the speech is really about how little Katherina has been tamed; "she steals the scene from her husband, who has held the stage throughout the play, and reveals that he has failed to tame her in the sense he set out to. He has gained her outward compliance in the form of a public display, while her spirit remains mischievously free."

In relation to this interpretation, William Empson suggests that Katherina was originally performed by an adult male actor rather than a young boy. He argues that the play indicates on several occasions that Katherina is physically strong, and even capable of over-powering Petruchio. For example, this is demonstrated off-stage when the horse falls on her as she is riding to Petruchio's home, and she is able to lift it off herself, and later when she throws Petruchio off a servant he is beating. Empson argues that the point is not that Katherina is, as a woman, weak, but that she is not well cast in the role in life which she finds herself having to play. The end of the play then offers blatant irony when a strong male actor, dressed as a woman, lectures women on how to play their parts.

The fourth school of thought is that the play is a farce, and hence the speech should not be read seriously or ironically. For example, Robert B. Heilman argues that "the whole wager scene falls essentially within the realm of farce: the responses are largely mechanical, as is their symmetry. Kate's final long speech on the obligations and fitting style of wives we can think of as a more or less automatic statement – that is, the kind appropriate to farce – of a generally held doctrine." He further makes his case by positing:

there are two arguments against [an ironic interpretation]. One is that a careful reading of the lines will show that most of them have to be taken literally; only the last seven or eight lines can be read with ironic overtones [...] The second is that some forty lines of straight irony would be too much to be borne; it would be inconsistent with the straightforwardness of most of the play, and it would really turn Kate back into a hidden shrew whose new technique was sarcastic indirection, side mouthing at the audience, while her not very intelligent husband, bamboozled, cheered her on.

Another way in which to read the speech (and the play) as farcical is to focus on the Induction. H.J. Oliver, for example, emphasising the importance of the Induction, writes "the play within the play has been presented only after all the preliminaries have encouraged us to take it as a farce. We have been warned." Of Katherina's speech, he argues:

this lecture by Kate on the wife's duty to submit is the only fitting climax to the farce – and for that very reason, it cannot logically be taken seriously, orthodox though the views expressed may be [...] attempting to take the last scene as a continuation of the realistic portrayal of character leads some modern producers to have it played as a kind of private joke between Petruchio and Kate – or even have Petruchio imply that by now he is thoroughly ashamed of himself. It does not, cannot, work. The play has changed key: it has modulated back from something like realistic social comedy to the other, 'broader' kind of entertainment that was foretold by the Induction.

Emma Smith suggests a possible fifth interpretation: Petruchio and Kate have colluded together to plot this set-piece speech, "a speech learned off pat", to demonstrate that Kate is the most obedient of the three wives and so allow Petruchio to win the wager.

=== Gender politics ===
The issue of gender politics is an important theme in The Taming of the Shrew. In a letter to the Pall Mall Gazette, George Bernard Shaw famously called the play "one vile insult to womanhood and manhood from the first word to the last." A critic, Emily Detmer, points out that in the late 16th and early 17th century, laws curtailing husbands' use of violence in disciplining their wives were becoming more commonplace; "the same culture that still "felt good" about dunking scolds, whipping whores, or burning witches was becoming increasingly sensitive about husbands beating their wives." Detmer argues:

the vigor of public discourse on wife-beating exemplifies a culture at work reformulating permissible and impermissible means for husbands to maintain control over the politics of the family, without, however, questioning that goal. This new boundary was built on notions of class and civil behaviour. Shakespeare's The Taming of the Shrew acts as a comedic roadmap for reconfiguring these emergent modes of "skillful" and civilised dominance for gentlemen, that is, for subordinating a wife without resorting to the "common" man's brute strength.

Petruchio's answer is to psychologically tame Katherina, a method not frowned upon by society; "the play signals a shift towards a "modern" way of managing the subordination of wives by legitimatising domination as long as it is not physical." Detmer argues "Shakespeare's "shrew" is tamed in a manner that would have made the wife-beating reformers proud; Petruchio's taming "policy" dramatises how abstention from physical violence works better. The play encourages its audience not only to pay close attention to Petruchio's method but also to judge and enjoy the method's permissibility because of the absence of blows and the harmonious outcome."

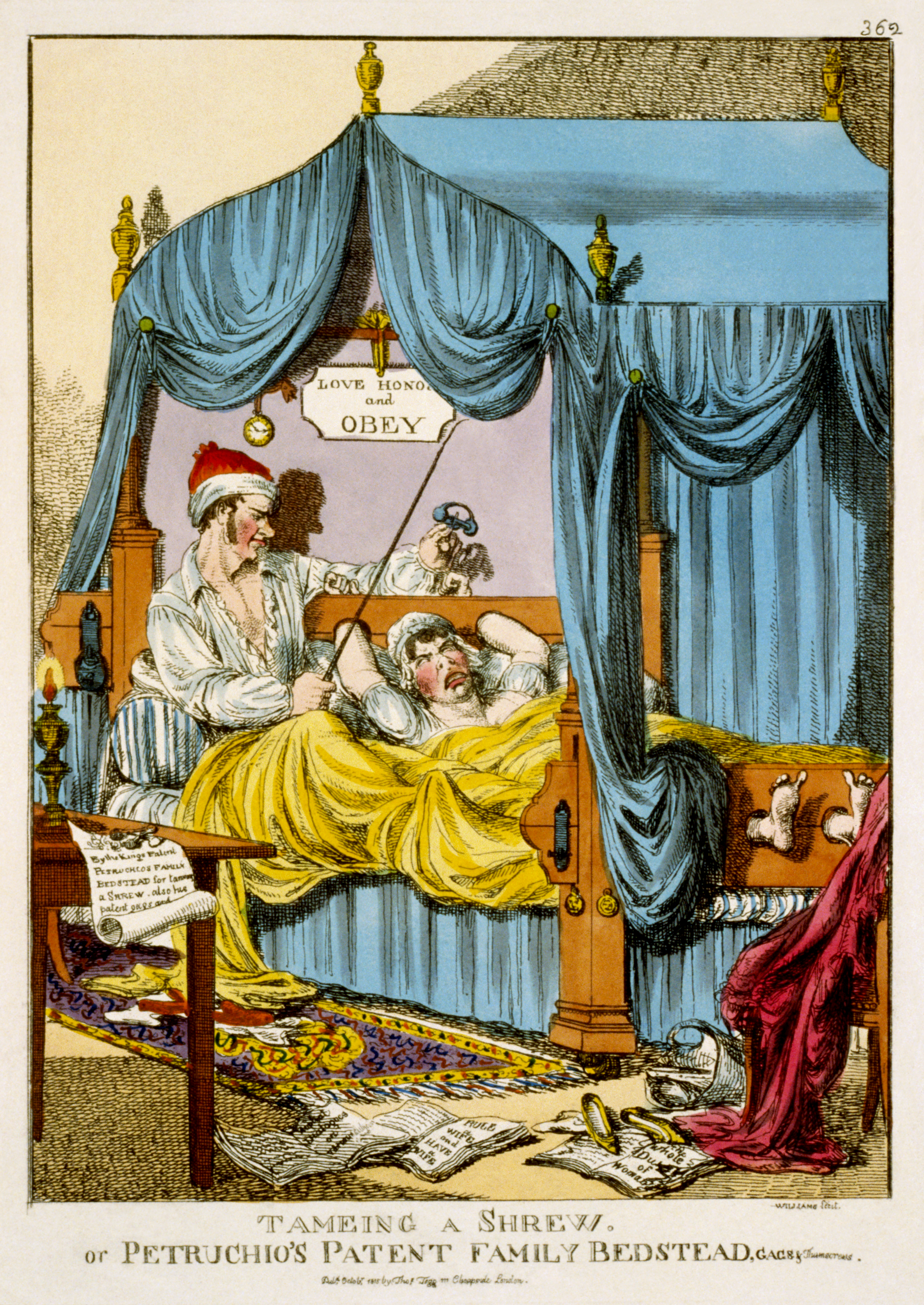
'Williams' cartoon from Caricature magazine; "Tameing a Shrew; or, Petruchio's Patent Family Bedstead, Gags & Thumscrews" (1815)

However, Detmer is critical of scholars who defend Shakespeare for depicting male dominance in a less brutal fashion than many of his contemporaries. For example, although not specifically mentioned by Detmer, Michael West writes "the play's attitude was characteristically Elizabethan and was expressed more humanly by Shakespeare than by some of his sources." Detmer goes on to read the play in light of modern psychological theories regarding women's responses to domestic violence, and argues that Katherina develops Stockholm syndrome:

a model of domestic violence that includes tactics other than physical violence gives readers a way in which to understand Kate's romanticised surrender at the end of the play as something other than consensual, as, in fact, a typical response to abuse [...] Like a victim of the Stockholm syndrome, she denies her own feelings in order to bond with her abuser. Her surrender and obedience signify her emotional bondage as a survival strategy; she aims to please because her life depends upon it. Knowing how the Stockholm syndrome works can help us to see that whatever "subjectivity" might be achieved is created out of domination and coercive bonding.

In a Marxist reading of the play, Natasha Korda argues that, although Petruchio is not characterised as a violent man, he still embodies sixteenth-century notions regarding the subjugation and objectification of women. Shrew-taming stories existed prior to Shakespeare's play, and in such stories, "the object of the tale was simply to put the shrew to work, to restore her (frequently through some gruesome form of punishment) to her proper productive place within the household economy." Petruchio does not do this, but Korda argues he still works to curtail the activities of the woman; "Kate [is] not a reluctant producer, but rather an avid and sophisticated consumer of market goods [...] Petruchio's taming strategy is accordingly aimed not at his wife's productive capacity – not once does he ask Kate to brew, bake, wash, card, or spin – but at her consumption. He seeks to educate her in her role as a consumer." She believes that even though Petruchio does not use force to tame Katherina, his actions are still an endorsement of patriarchy; he makes her his property and tames her into accepting a patriarchal economic worldview. Vital in this reading is Katherina's final speech, which Korda argues "inaugurates a new gendered division of labour, according to which husbands "labour both by sea and land" while their wives luxuriate at home [...] In erasing the status of housework as work, separate-sphere ideology renders the housewife perpetually indebted to her husband [...] The Taming of the Shrew marks the emergence of the ideological separation of feminine and masculine spheres of labour."

In a theology-based reading of how gender politics are handled in the play, David Beauregard reads the relationship between Katherina and Petruchio in traditional Aristotelian terms. Petruchio, as the architect of virtue (Politics, 1.13), brings Kate into harmony with her nature by developing her "new-built virtue and obedience", (5.2.118), and she, in turn, brings to Petruchio in her person all the Aristotelian components of happiness – wealth and good fortune, virtue, friendship and love, the promise of domestic peace and quiet (Nicomachean Ethics, 1.7–8). The virtue of obedience at the center of Kate's final speech is not what Aristotle describes as the despotic rule of master over slave, but rather the statesman's rule over a free and equal person (Politics, 1.3, 12–13). Recognising the evil of despotic domination, the play holds up in inverse form Kate's shrewishness, the feminine form of the will to dominance, as an evil that obstructs natural fulfillment and destroys marital happiness.

=== Cruelty ===
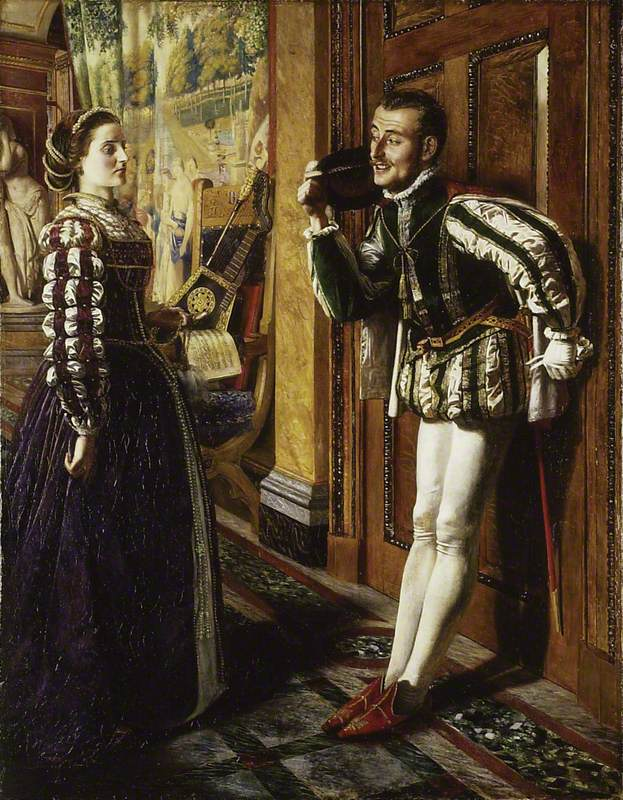
Katherine and Petruchio, Robert Braithwaite Martineau (1855)

Another theme in the play is cruelty. Alexander Leggatt states:

the taming of Katherina is not just a lesson, but a game – a test of skill and a source of pleasure. The roughness is, at bottom, part of the fun: such is the peculiar psychology of sport that one is willing to endure aching muscles and risk the occasional broken limb for the sake of the challenge. The sports most often recalled throughout the play are blood sports, hunting and hawking, thus invoking in the audience the state of mind in which cruelty and violence are acceptable, even exciting, because their scope is limited by tacit agreement and they are made the occasion for a display of skill.

Ann Thompson argues that "the fact that in the folktale versions the shrew-taming story always comes to its climax when the husbands wager on their wives' obedience must have been partly responsible for the large number of references to sporting, gaming and gambling throughout the play. These metaphors can help to make Petruchio's cruelty acceptable by making it seem limited and conventionalised." Marvin Bennet Krims argues that "the play leans heavily on representations of cruelty for its comedic effect." He believes cruelty permeates the entire play, including the Induction, arguing the Sly frame, with the Lord's spiteful practical joke, prepares the audience for a play willing to treat cruelty as a comedic matter. He suggests that cruelty is a more important theme than gender, arguing that "the aggression represented in Taming can be read as having less to do with gender and more to do with hate, with the text thereby becoming a comic representation of the general problem of human cruelty and victimisation."

Director Michael Bogdanov, who directed the play in 1978, considers that "Shakespeare was a feminist":

Shakespeare shows women totally abused – like animals – bartered to the highest bidder. He shows women used as commodities, not allowed to choose for themselves. In The Taming of the Shrew you get that extraordinary scene between Baptista, Gremio, and Tranio, where they are vying with each other to see who can offer most for Bianca, who is described as 'the prize'. It is a toss of the coin to see which way she will go: to the old man with a certain amount of money, or to the young man, who is boasting that he's got so many ships. She could end up with the old impotent fool, or the young 'eligible' man: what sort of life is that to look forward to? There is no question of it, [Shakespeare's] sympathy is with the women, and his purpose, to expose the cruelty of a society that allows these things to happen.

=== Money ===
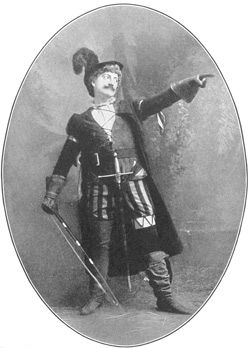
John Drew as Petruchio in Augustin Daly's 1887 production at Daly's Theatre, New York

The motivation of money is another theme. When speaking of whether or not someone may ever want to marry Katherina, Hortensio says "Though it pass your patience and mine to endure her loud alarums, why man, there be good fellows in the world, and a man could light on them, would take her with all faults and money enough" (1.1.125–128). In the scene that follows Petruchio says:

If thou know
One rich enough to be Petruchio's wife-
As wealth is burden of my wooing dance-
Be she as foul as was Florentius' love,
As old as Sibyl, and as curst and shrewd
As Socrates' Xanthippe, or a worse,
She moves me not.
(1.2.65–71)

A few lines later Grumio says, "Why give him gold enough and marry him to a puppet or an aglet-baby, or an old trot with ne're a tooth in her head, though she have as many diseases as two and fifty horses. Why, nothing comes amiss, so money comes withal" (1.2.77–80). Furthermore, Petruchio is encouraged to woo Katherina by Gremio, Tranio (as Lucentio), and Hortensio, who vow to pay him if he wins her, on top of Baptista's dowry ("After my death, the one half of my lands, and in possession, twenty thousand crowns"). Later, Petruchio does not agree with Baptista on the subject of love in this exchange:

BAPTISTA
When the special thing is well obtained,
That is, her love; for that is all in all.

PETRUCHIO
Why that is nothing.
(2.1.27–29)

Gremio and Tranio literally bid for Bianca. As Baptista says, "'Tis deeds must win the prize, and he of both/That can assure my daughter greatest dower/Shall have my Bianca's love" (2.1.344–346).

== Adaptations ==
=== Opera ===
The first opera based on the play was Ferdinando Bertoni's opera buffa Il duca di Atene (1780), with libretto by Carlo Francesco Badini.

Frederic Reynolds' Catherine and Petruchio (1828) is an adaptation of Garrick, with an overture taken from Gioachino Rossini, songs derived from numerous Shakespeare plays and sonnets, and music by John Braham and Thomas Simpson Cooke. Starring Fanny Ayton and James William Wallack, the opera premiered at Drury Lane, but it was not successful, and closed after only a few performances. Hermann Goetz' Der Widerspänstigen Zähmung (1874), with libretto by Joseph Viktor Widmann, is a comic opera, which focuses on the Bianca subplot, and cuts back the taming story. It was first performed at the original National Theatre Mannheim. John Kendrick Bangs' Katherine: A Travesty (1888) is a Gilbert and Sullivan-style parody operetta which premiered in the Metropolitan Opera. Spyridon Samaras' La furia domata: commedia musicale in tre atti (1895) is a now lost lyric comedy with libretto by Enrico Annibale Butti and Giulio Macchi, which premiered at the Teatro Lirico. Ruperto Chapí's Las bravías (1896), with a libretto by José López Silva and Carlos Fernández Shaw, is a one-act género chico zarzuela clearly based on the story, but with names changed and the location altered to Madrid: it was a major success in Spain, with over 200 performances in 1896 alone, and continues to be performed regularly.

Johan Wagenaar's De getemde feeks (1909) is the second of three overtures Wagenaar wrote based on Shakespeare, the others being Koning Jan (1891) and Driekoningenavond (1928). Another overture inspired by the play is Alfred Reynolds' The Taming of the Shrew Overture (1927). Ermanno Wolf-Ferrari's verismo opera Sly, ovvero la leggenda del dormiente risvegliato (1927) focuses on the Induction, with libretto by Giovacchino Forzano. A tragedy, the opera depicts Sly as a hard-drinking and debt-ridden poet who sings in a London pub. When he is tricked into believing that he is a lord, his life improves, but upon learning it is a ruse, he mistakenly concludes the woman he loves (Dolly) only told him she loved him as part of the ruse. In despair, he kills himself by cutting his wrists, with Dolly arriving too late to save him. Starring Aureliano Pertile and Mercedes Llopart, it was first performed at La Scala in Milan. Rudolf Karel's The Taming of the Shrew is an unfinished opera upon which he worked between 1942 and 1944. Philip Greeley Clapp's The Taming of the Shrew (1948) was first performed at the Metropolitan Opera. Vittorio Giannini's The Taming of the Shrew (1953) is an opera buffa, with libretto by Giannini and Dorothy Fee. It was first performed at the Cincinnati Music Hall, starring Dorothy Short and Robert Kircher. Vissarion Shebalin's Ukroshchenye stroptivoy (1957), with libretto by Abram Akimovich Gozenpud, was Shebalin's last opera and was immediately hailed as a masterpiece throughout Russia. Dominick Argento's Christopher Sly (1962), with libretto by John Manlove, is a comic opera in two scenes and an interlude, first performed in the University of Minnesota. Sly is duped by a Lord into believing that he himself is a lord. However, he soon becomes aware of the ruse, and when left alone, he flees with the Lord's valuables and his two mistresses.

=== Musical/ballet ===
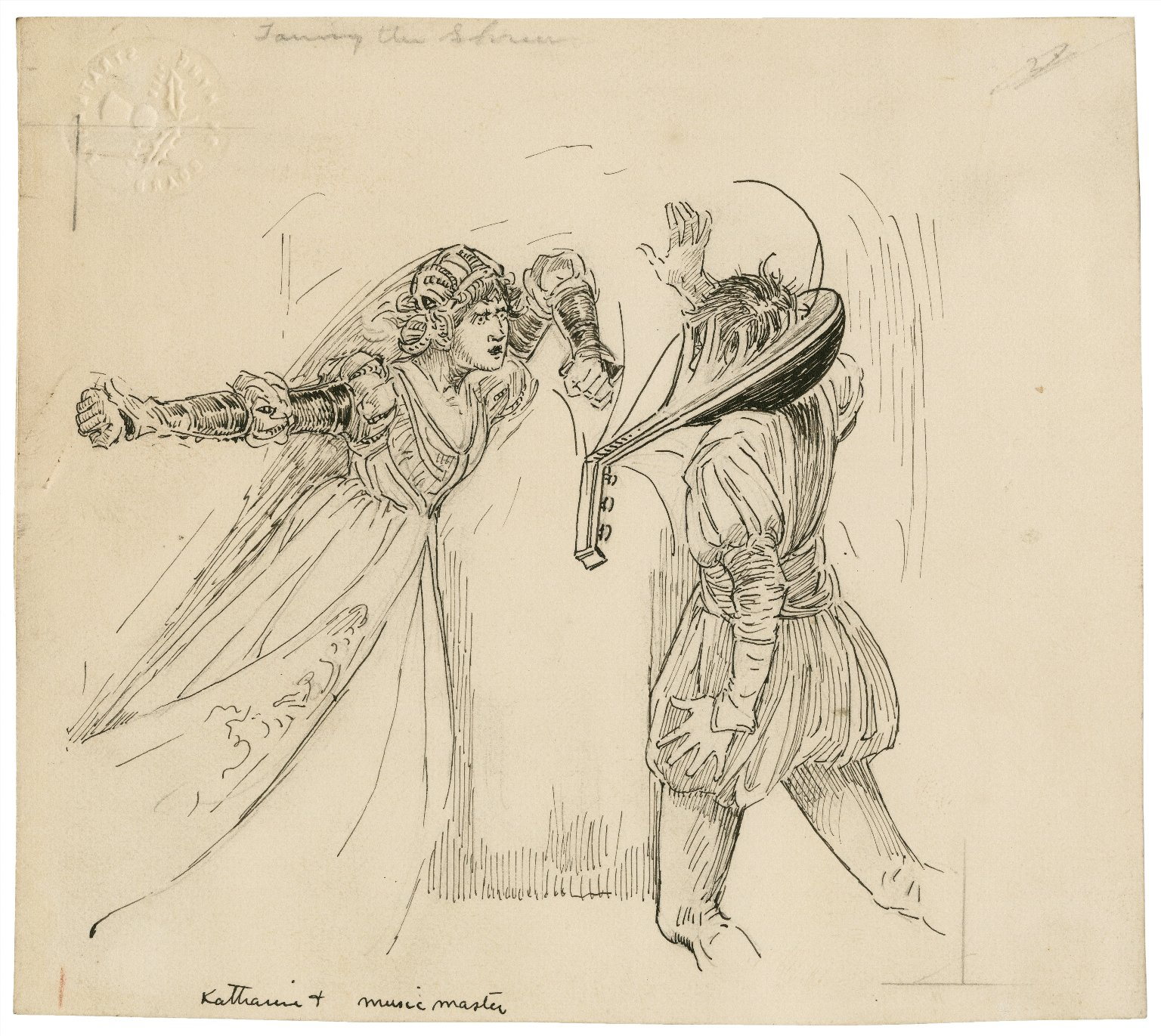
Louis Rhead ink drawing of Katherine breaking a lute over Hortensio's head, designed for a 1918 edition of Tales from Shakespeare

The earliest known musical adaptation of the play was a ballad opera based on Charles Johnson's The Cobler of Preston. Called The Cobler of Preston's Opera, the piece was anonymously written, although William Dunkin is thought by some scholars as a likely candidate. Rehearsals for the premiere began in Smock Alley in October 1731, but sometime in November or December, the show was cancelled. It was instead performed by a group of children (including an eleven-year-old Peg Woffington) in January 1732 at Signora Violante's New Booth in Dame Street. It was subsequently published in March.

James Worsdale's A Cure for a Scold is also a ballad opera. First performed at Drury Lane in 1735, starring Kitty Clive and Charles Macklin, A Cure for a Scold was an adaptation of Lacy's Sauny the Scot rather than Shakespeare's original Taming of the Shrew. Petruchio was renamed Manly, and Katherina was renamed Margaret (nicknamed Peg). At the end, there is no wager. Instead, Peg pretends she is dying, and as Petruchio runs for a doctor, she reveals she is fine, and declares "you have taught me what 'tis to be a Wife, and I shall make it my Study to be obliging and obedient," to which Manly replies "My best Peg, we will exchange Kindness, and be each others Servants." After the play has finished, the actress playing Peg steps forward and speaks directly to the audience as herself; "Well, I must own, it wounds me to the Heart/To play, unwomanly, so mean a Part./What – to submit, so tamely – so contented,/Thank Heav'n! I'm not the Thing I represented."

Cole Porter's musical Kiss Me, Kate is an adaptation of Taming of the Shrew. The music and lyrics are by Porter and the book is by Samuel and Bella Spewack. It is at least partially based on the 1935/1936 Theatre Guild production of Taming of the Shrew, which starred husband and wife Alfred Lunt and Lynn Fontanne, whose backstage fights became legendary. The musical tells the story of a husband and wife acting duo (Fred and Lilli) attempting to stage The Taming of the Shrew, but whose backstage fights keep getting in the way. The musical opened on Broadway at the New Century Theatre in 1948, running for a total of 1,077 performances. Directed by John C. Wilson with choreography by Hanya Holm, it starred Patricia Morison and Alfred Drake. The production moved to the West End in 1951, directed by Samuel Spewack with choreography again by Holm, and starring Patricia Morison and Bill Johnson. It ran for 501 performances. As well as being a box office hit, the musical was also a critical success, winning five Tony Awards; Best Authors (Musical), Best Original Score, Best Costume Design, Best Musical and Best Producers (Musical). The play has since been revived numerous times in various countries. Its 1999 revival at the Martin Beck Theatre, directed by Michael Blakemore and starring Marin Mazzie and Brian Stokes Mitchell, was especially successful, winning another five Tonys; Best Actor (Musical), Best Costume Design, Best Director (Musical), Best Orchestrations, and Best Revival (Musical).

The first ballet version of the play was Maurice Béjart's La mégère apprivoisée. Using the music of Alessandro Scarlatti, it was originally performed by the Ballet de l'Opéra de Paris in 1954. The best known ballet adaptation is John Cranko's The Taming of the Shrew, first performed by the Stuttgart Ballet at the Staatsoper Stuttgart in 1969. Another ballet adaptation is Louis Falco's Kate's Rag, first performed by the Louis Falco Dance Company at the Akademie der Künste in 1980. In 1988, Aleksandre Machavariani composed a ballet suite, but it was not performed until 2009, when his son, conductor Vakhtang Machavariani, gave a concert at the Georgian National Music Center featuring music by Modest Mussorgsky, Sergei Prokofiev and some of his father's pieces.

=== Radio ===
In 1924, extracts from the play were broadcast on BBC Radio, performed by the Cardiff Station Repertory Company as the eight episode of a series of programs showcasing Shakespeare's plays, entitled Shakespeare Night. Extracts were also broadcast in 1925 as part of Shakespeare: Scene and Story, with Edna Godfrey-Turner and William Macready, and in 1926 as part of Shakespeare's Heroines, with Madge Titheradge and Edmund Willard. In 1927, a forty-three-minute truncation of the play was broadcast on BBC National Programme, with Barbara Couper and Ian Fleming. In 1932, National Programme aired another truncated version, this one running eighty-five minutes, and again starring Couper, with Francis James as Petruchio. In 1935, Peter Creswell directed a broadcast of the relatively complete text (only the Bianca subplot was trimmed) on National Programme, starring Mary Hinton and Godfrey Tearle. This was the first non-theatrical version of the play to feature Sly, who was played by Stuart Robertson. In 1941, Creswell directed another adaptation for BBC Home Service, again starring Tearle, with Fay Compton as Katherina. In 1947, BBC Light Programme aired extracts for their Theatre Programme from John Burrell's Edinburgh Festival production, with Patricia Burke and Trevor Howard. In 1954, the full-length play aired on BBC Home Service, directed by Peter Watts, starring Mary Wimbush and Joseph O'Conor, with Norman Shelley as Sly. BBC Radio 4 aired another full-length broadcast (without the Induction) in 1973 as part of their Monday Night Theatre series, directed by Ian Cotterell, starring Fenella Fielding and Paul Daneman. In 1989, BBC Radio 3 aired the full play, directed by Jeremy Mortimer, starring Cheryl Campbell and Bob Peck, with William Simons as Sly. In 2000, BBC Radio 3 aired another full-length production (without the Induction) as part of their Shakespeare for the New Millennium series, directed by Melanie Harris, and starring Ruth Mitchell and Gerard McSorley.

In the United States, the first major radio production was in July 1937 on NBC Blue Network, when John Barrymore adapted the play into a forty-five-minute piece, starring Elaine Barrie and Barrymore himself. In August of the same year, CBS Radio aired a sixty-minute adaptation directed by Brewster Mason, starring Frieda Inescort and Edward G. Robinson. The adaptation was written by Gilbert Seldes, who employed a narrator (Godfrey Tearle) to fill in gaps in the story, tell the audience about the clothes worn by the characters and offer opinions as to the direction of the plot. For example, Act 4, Scene 5 ends with the narrator musing "We know that Katherina obeys her husband, but has her spirit been really tamed I wonder?" In 1940, a thirty-minute musical version of the play written by Joseph Gottlieb and Irvin Graham aired on CBS as part of their Columbia Workshop series, starring Nan Sunderland and Carleton Young. In 1941, NBC Blue Network aired a sixty-minute adaptation as part of their Great Plays series, written by Ranald MacDougall, directed by Charles Warburton, and starring Grace Coppin and Herbert Rudley. In 1949, ABC Radio aired an adaptation directed by Homer Fickett, starring Joyce Redman and Burgess Meredith. In 1953, NBC broadcast William Dawkins' production live from the Oregon Shakespeare Festival. The cast list for this production has been lost, but it is known to have featured George Peppard. In 1960, NBC aired a sixty-minute version adapted by Carl Ritchie from Robert Loper's stage production for the Oregon Shakespeare Festival, starring Ann Hackney and Gerard Larson.
