= The Troublemaker (1924 film) =

1924 film

- Spanish: La revoltosa
- Directed by: Florián Rey
- Written by: Carlos Fernández Shaw (zarzuela); José López Silva (zarzuela); Florián Rey
- Produced by: Juan Figuera Vargas
- Cinematography: Luis R. Alonso
- Production company: Goya Producciones Cinematográficas
- Release date: 1924
- Country: Spain
- Languages: Silent; Spanish intertitles

The Troublemaker (Spanish: La revoltosa) is a 1924 Spanish silent film directed by Florián Rey and starring Josefina Tapias, Juan de Orduña and José Moncayo. The film was based on The Troublemaker an 1897 zarzuela by Carlos Fernández Shaw and José López Silva.

== Cast ==
- Josefina Tapias as Mari Pepa
- Juan de Orduña as Felipe
- José Moncayo as inspector Candela
- Ceferino Barrajón as Sastre
- Antonio Mata as Zapatero
- Alfredo Hurtado as Golfillo
