= La revoltosa =

Zarzuela by Ruperto Chapí (1897)

- Zarzuela by Ruperto Chapí
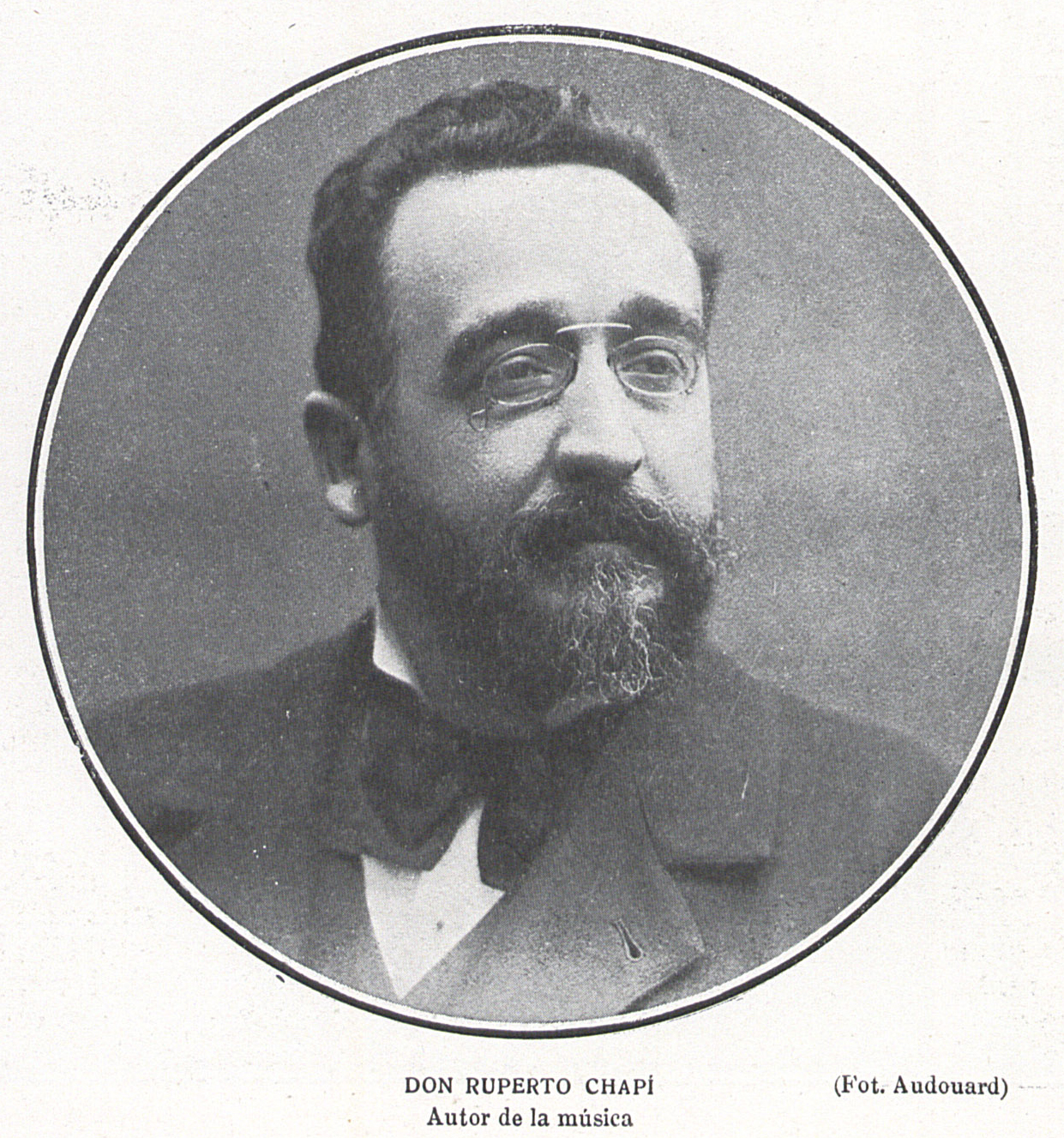
- Ruperto Chapí in 1905
- Translation: The Troublemaker
- Librettist: Carlos Fernández Shaw; José López Silva
- Language: Spanish
- Premiere: 25 November 1897; Teatro Apolo, Madrid

La revoltosa (The Troublemaker) is a Spanish zarzuela with a libretto by José López Silva and Carlos Fernández Shaw and music by Ruperto Chapí. It premiered on 25 November 1897 at the Apollo Theatre in Madrid.

== Adaptations ==
It has been made into several films:

- The Troublemaker (1924 film), a silent film directed by Florián Rey
- The Troublemaker (1950 film), a film directed by José Díaz Morales
- The Troublemaker (1963 film), a film also directed by José Díaz Morales
- The Troublemaker (1969 film), a film directed by Juan de Orduña

== Bibliography ==
- Vincent J. Cincotta. Zarzuela, the Spanish Lyric Theatre: A Complete Reference. University of Wollongong Press, 2002.
