= José López Silva =

José López Silva may refer to:

- José López Silva (playwright) (1861–1925), Spanish playwright
- José López Silva (footballer) (born 1983), Spanish footballer
