= Las bravías =

1896 zarzuela by Ruperto Chapí

- Zarzuela by Ruperto Chapí
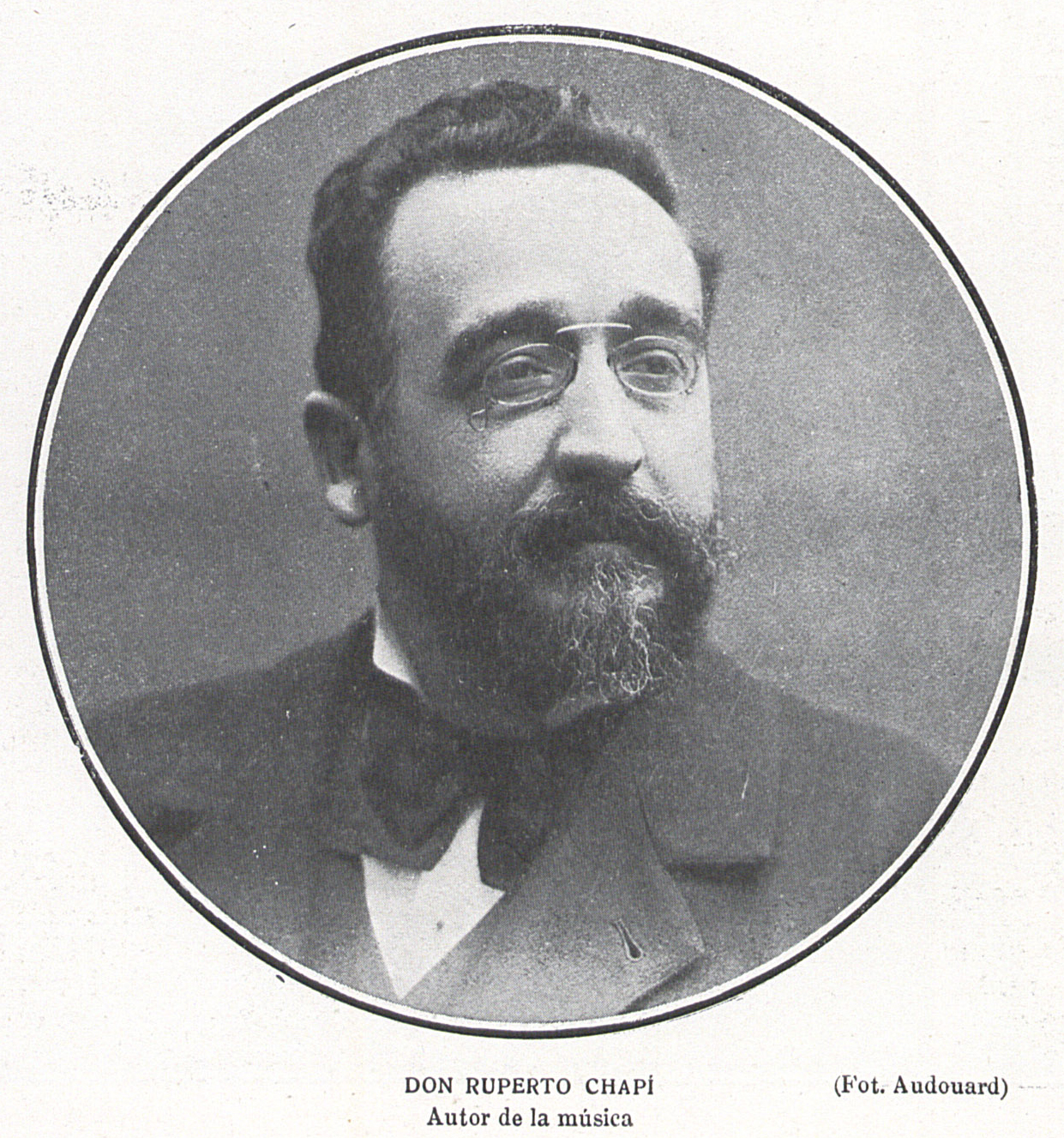
- Ruperto Chapí in 1905
- Translation: The Pigeons
- Librettist: Carlos Fernández Shaw; José López Silva
- Language: Spanish
- Based on: Shakespeare's The Taming of the Shrew
- Premiere: 12 December 1896 (incomplete); Teatro Apolo, Madrid

Las bravías (The Pigeons) is a zarzuela in one act and four scenes with music by Ruperto Chapí. The work uses a Spanish language libretto by Carlos Fernández Shaw and José López Silva that is based on Shakespeare's The Taming of the Shrew. The opera premiered on 12 December 1896 at the Teatro Apolo in Madrid. Excerpts from the opera were recorded by tenor José Carreras, conductor Enrique García Asensio, and the English Chamber Orchestra in 1975 for Brilliant Classics.

== Roles ==
Roles, voice types, premiere cast
Role	Voice type	Premiere cast, 12 December 1896 Conductor: Ruperto Chapí
Patro	soprano	Isabel Brú
Primorosa	soprano	Clotilde Perales
Gurriato	tenor	Emilio Mesejo
Melania	contralto	Pilar Vidal
Lucio	baritone	José Rodríguez
Colás, padre de Patro	bass	José Mesejo
Vencejo	tenor	José López Ontiveros
Tomasa	soprano	Aurora Rodríguez
Paca	soprano	Carmen Palmer
Altar boy	tenor	Luis Manzano Mancebo
Alarcón	bass	Mr. Incia
Epifanio	spoken role	Mr. Ripio
