= The Troublemaker (1963 film) =

- Directed by: José Díaz Morales
- Written by: Carlos Fernández Shaw (libretto); José López Silva (libretto); Guillermo Fernández Shaw; Francisco Ramos de Castro; Ricardo Toledo; Fernando Merelo; José Antonio de la Loma; José Díaz Morales
- Produced by: Francisco Balcázar; Enrique Herreros
- Starring: Teresa Lorca; Germán Cobos; Antonio Vico
- Cinematography: Francisco Marín
- Edited by: Pablo G. del Amo
- Music by: Manuel Parada
- Production company: Balcázar Producciones Cinematográficas
- Release date: 9 December 1963
- Running time: 95 minutes
- Country: Spain
- Language: Spanish

The Troublemaker (Spanish:La revoltosa) is a 1963 Spanish musical film directed by José Díaz Morales and starring Teresa Lorca, Germán Cobos and Antonio Vico. The film is based on The Troublemaker an 1897 zarzuela by Carlos Fernández Shaw and José López Silva, which the director had previously turned into a 1950 film The Troublemaker. It was shot in Eastmancolor.

== Cast ==
- Teresa Lorca as Mari Pepa
- Germán Cobos as Felipe
- Antonio Vico as Don José
- Antonio Almorós as Ulpiano
- Xan das Bolas as Jugador de cartas
- Mercedes Borqué as Planchadora
- Paquito Cano as Atenedoro
- Ricardo Canales as Inspector de policía
- Mónica Randall as Inés
- Antonio Malonda as Muquiqui
- Jesús Puche as Sr. Candelas
- Carmen Porcel as Maestra planchadora
- Julia Pachelo as Doña Casta
- Matilde Muñoz Sampedro as Encarna
- Antonio Riquelme as Tiberio
- Manuel Arbó as Sr. Paco
- Agustín Zaragoza as Elocuente
- Amalia Rodríguez as Gorgonia
- Laly Soldevila as Sole
- Tomás Blanco as Don Leo
- Manolo Gómez Bur as Viruta

== Bibliography ==
- Goble, Alan. The Complete Index to Literary Sources in Film. Walter de Gruyter, 1999.
