= Mónica Randall =

Spanish film actress (born 1942)

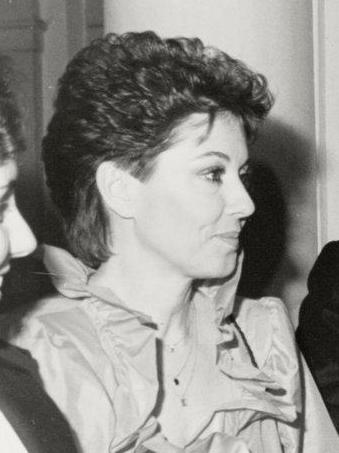
- Randall in 1983
- Born: Aurora Juliá Sarasa; 18 November 1942 (age 83); Barcelona, Spain
- Years active: 1963–2009

Aurora Juliá Sarasa (Barcelona, 18 November 1942), known professionally as Mónica Randall, is a Spanish actress and television presenter.

Randall has made some 110 appearances in film and television since 1963. She appeared in numerous Spaghetti Westerns in the 1960s in films such as One Hundred Thousand Dollars for Ringo (1965) and has made regular television appearances since the 1970s.

== Selected filmography ==
- The Troublemaker (1963)
- Z7 Operation Rembrandt (1966)
- Killer 77, Alive or Dead (1966)
- Cristina Guzmán (1968)
- A Decent Adultery (1969)
- The Troublemaker (1969)
- Red Sun (1971)
- The Witches Mountain (1972)
- La cruz del diablo (1975)
- Inquisition (1976)
- Cría Cuervos (1976)

== Accolades ==
=== Awards and nominations ===
Year	Award	Category	Work	Result	R.
1974	TP de Oro	Best Female Television Presenter	Mónica de medianoche	Won	
1976	CEC Awards	Best Actress in a Leading Role	Retrato de Familia	Won	
1978	Fotogramas de Plata	Best Performer in Spanish Cinema	La escopeta nacional	Won	
2014	Sant Jordi Awards	Lifetime Achievement		Won	
2018	Málaga Film Festival	Biznaga Ciudad del Paraíso		Won	
2021	Melilla Film Week	José Sacristán Award		Won	
2024	Feroz Awards	Feroz of Honor		Won	

== External links and sources ==
- Mónica Randall at IMDb
