= The Troublemaker (1950 film) =

1950 film

- Directed by: José Díaz Morales
- Written by: Guillermo Fernández Shaw; Francisco Ramos de Castro; Ricardo Toledo; Fernando Merelo; José Díaz Morales
- Based on: La revoltosa by: José López Silva; Carlos Fernández Shaw
- Starring: Carmen Sevilla; Tony Leblanc; Tomás Blanco
- Cinematography: Emilio Foriscot; Alfredo Fraile
- Edited by: Sara Ontañón
- Music by: Manuel Parada
- Production company: Intercontinental Films
- Release date: 12 October 1950
- Running time: 109 minutes
- Country: Spain
- Language: Spanish

The Troublemaker or The Mischievous Girl (Spanish: La revoltosa) is a 1950 Spanish musical comedy film directed by José Díaz Morales and starring Carmen Sevilla, Tony Leblanc and Tomás Blanco. It is based on the 1897 zarzuela The Troublemaker.

== Synopsis ==
The action takes place in a typical Madrid sliding house where the characters who bring the film to life humbly live. The rooms or dwellings are distributed around a neighborhood patio, the true protagonist of each scene; From the courtyard a staircase leads to the houses where Mary Pepa — an ironer by trade — and her aunt Josefa de Ella, and Felipe, an officer in a carpentry workshop, stay. Mary Pepa is cheerful and flirtatious, very independent and because of her self-confidence and beauty she has revolutionized the entire neighborhood.

Two other characters live outside the building who will give life to the rough passage of the plot. They are characters added for the film that do not exist in the original work of the zarzuela. One is Manolo, brother of Mary Pepa, without a trade or job, who is dedicated to stealing jewelry and other objects. The other is the fence Don Leo, a middle-aged man who got rich from buying and selling stolen goods. Don Leo is in love with Mary Pepa, just like Felipe.

A series of scenes follow one another in the courtyard, mostly comic, entangled and misleading. Outside the courtyard are the dramatic scenes of the robbery, of Don Leo's house and the blackmail he does to the boy by offering not to report him to the police in exchange for obtaining the favors of his sister. Another scene invented for the film is the attendance of Mary Pepa and Felipe at the theater where they attend the performance of the zarzuela La Revoltosa; the young people identify with the protagonists when they sing the famous duet of the double carnations.

The film has a happy ending after the truth is discovered. The characters happily march to the verbena.

== Cast ==
- Carmen Sevilla as Mari Pepa
- Tony Leblanc as Felipe
- Tomás Blanco as Don Leo
- Faustino Bretaño as Sr. Candelas
- Antonio Riquelme as Tiberio
- Mario Berriatúa as Manolo
- Raúl Cancio as Presentador concurso chotis
- Paquito Cano as Atenedoro
- Manuel de Juan as Cándido
- Ramón Martori as Inspector de policía
- Enrique Herreros as Mozo de cuerda
- María Brú as Tía Josefa
- Carmen de Lucio as Portera
- Matilde Muñoz Sampedro as Gorgonia
- Virginia de Matos as Sole
- Julia Lajos as Señora gorda
- Marujita Díaz as Cantaora
- Pilar Cerezo as Bailaora
- Carmen Sánchez as Modista
- Juana Mansó as Compradora
- Antonia Plana as Encarna
- Juanita Solano
- María de los Ángeles Morales as Mari Pepa en teatro
- Luis Rodrigo as Felipe en teatro
- Manuel Arbó as Sr. Pepe

== Bibliography ==
- Goble, Alan. The Complete Index to Literary Sources in Film. Walter de Gruyter, 1999.
