= Francisco Ramos de Castro =

- Born: 1890; Madrid, Spain
- Died: 4 November 1963 (aged 72–73); Madrid, Spain
- Occupation: Writer
- Years active: 1927–1963 (film)

Francisco Ramos de Castro (1890–1963) was a Spanish journalist, poet, playwright and screenwriter.

== Selected filmography ==
- The Troublemaker (1950)
- The Troublemaker (1963)

== Bibliography ==
- Vincent J. Cincotta. Zarzuela, the Spanish Lyric Theatre: A Complete Reference. University of Wollongong Press, 2002.
