= Consuelo Mayendía =

Spanish soprano and actress

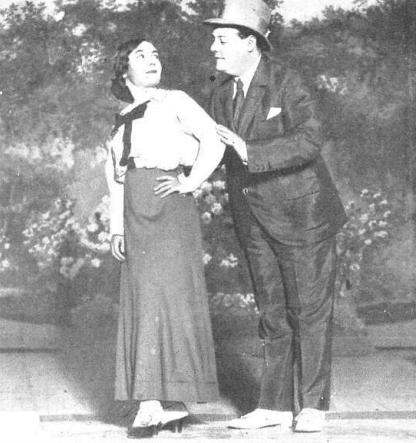
Consuelo Mayendía with Casimiro Ortas in a scene from the play Diana la cazadora

Consuelo Mayendía was a Spanish soprano and actress, born in Valencia.

== Biography ==
Most of Mayendía's career occurred during the first quarter of the 20th century where she became one of the biggest stars in the Teatro Apolo of Madrid. She performed in operettas and lyrical sketches which she combined in many instances with librettos by Carlos Arnichesmy, sharing the stage with José Moncayo. They appeared together in El trust de los tenorios (1910), El amo de la calle (1910), El amigo Melquíades (1914), Serafín el pinturero (1916). She also premiered in Diana la cazadora (1915), written by Hermanos Álvarez Quintero, with music by María Rodrigo. She was married to actor Cristóbal Sánchez del Pino.
