= José Díaz Morales =

Spanish actor, film director and film producer

- Born: 31 July 1908; Toledo, Spain
- Died: 1976 (68 years); Toledo, Spain
- Occupations: Screenwriter, Director
- Years active: 1938–1974 (film)

José Díaz Morales (Note: In this Spanish name, the first or paternal surname is Díaz and the second or maternal family name is Morales.) (1908–1976) was a Spanish journalist, screenwriter and film director. His career in film began during the Golden Age of Mexican Cinema.

Díaz Morales was born in Toledo on 31 July 1908. In the early part of the 1930s he worked on the newspaper El Heraldo de Madrid and, in 1936, he published the humorous book ¡Zas! Gulliver en el país de la calderilla, for which Miguel de Unamuno provided a prologue.

He emigrated to Mexico with the outbreak of the Spanish Civil War in 1936 and initially worked on the Mexico City daily Excélsior. He began in the film industry began as one of the scriptwriters for Canto a mi tierra (dir. José Bohr, 1938) and by directing the comedy short Charros Yuyuyyuy, featuring Arturo Manrique and Jorge Treviño. His first feature-length film as director was 1942's highly successful religious melodrama Jesus of Nazareth starring José Cibrián.

He returned to Spain in 1948, where he directed several films before returning to Mexico in the mid-1950s.

Over the course of his career, Díaz Morales directed around 90 films.

The date and place of José Díaz Morales's death is uncertain: some sources say he died in Mexico City while others report his death in Toledo; dates of both 1974 and 1976 are given.

== Selected filmography ==
=== Director ===
- Jesus of Nazareth (1942)
- Christopher Columbus (1943)
- Adultery (1945)
- Life on a Thread (1945)
- Strange Obsession (1947)
- A Gypsy in Jalisco (1947)
- Madam Temptation (1948)
- Peace (1949)
- The Captain from Loyola (1949)
- The Dangerous Age (1950)
- The Troublemaker (1950)
- Beauty Salon (1951)
- Private Secretary (1952)
- The Troublemaker (1963)

== Bibliography ==
- Bentley, Bernard. A Companion to Spanish Cinema. Boydell & Brewer Ltd, 2008.
