= Carlos Fernández Shaw =

Spanish poet, playwright, and journalist

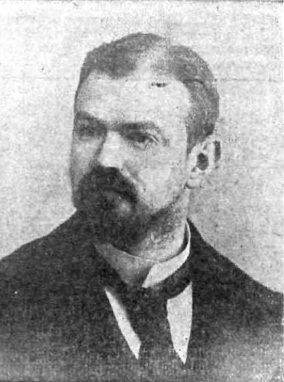
Carlos Fernández Shaw c. 1906

Carlos Fernández Shaw (23 September 1865 – 7 June 1911) was a Spanish poet, playwright, and journalist. He wrote the texts for many zarzuelas, including La revoltosa, La chavala and Las bravías, all in collaboration with José López Silva and with music by Ruperto Chapí. He also wrote the libretto for Chapí's through-written opera Margarita la tornera. He later wrote the libretto for La vida breve by Manuel de Falla, based on his tragic poem of gypsy life La chavalilla and drawing on ideas from La chavala. He wrote articles for La epoca, La illustración and El correo. He was also among the contributors of the Madrid-based avant-garde magazine Prometeo.

Fernández Shaw was born in Cádiz, the son of a Spanish father and an English mother. He was the father of the equally successful playwright and librettist Guillermo Fernández Shaw; while his grandson (also named Carlos Fernández Shaw) was a Spanish Consul General to the United States in the late 20th century, where he co-authored the book The Hispanic Presence in North America. He died in Madrid, aged 45.
