= José López Silva (playwright) =

Spanish playwright (1861–1925)

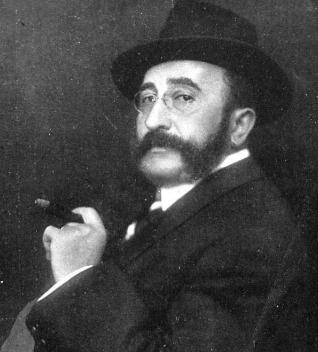
José López Silva

José López Silva (1861–1925) was a Spanish playwright.
