= Contemporary harpsichord =

20th century revival of harpsichord use

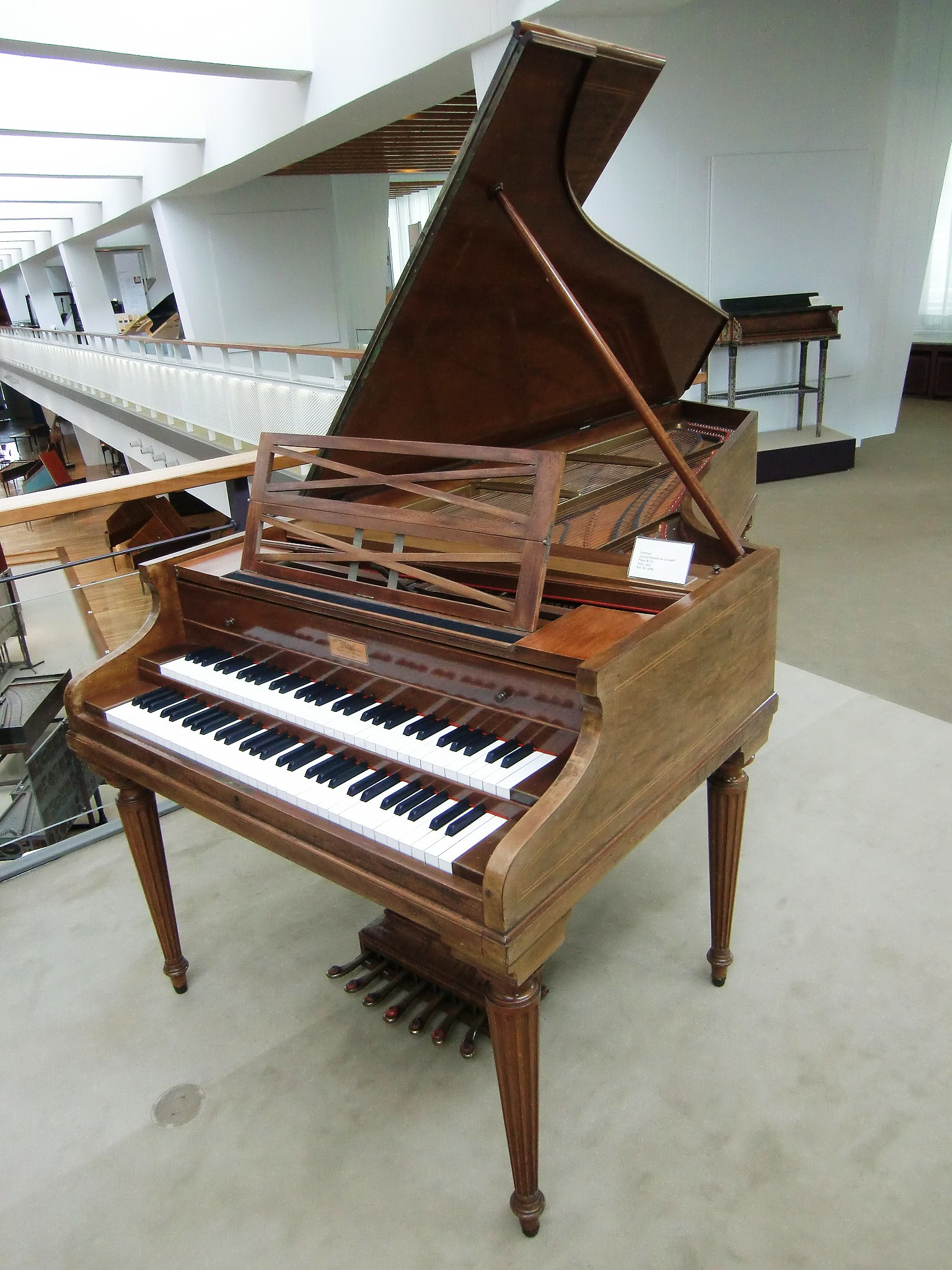
The harpsichordist Wanda Landowska was a key figure in the 20th-century revival of the harpsichord. Her instrument of choice was a (then) modern design, the Pleyel "Grand Modèle de Concert".

The harpsichord was a largely obsolete, and seldom played, instrument during a period lasting from the early 19th century to the early 20th. The instrument was successfully revived during the 20th century, first in an ahistorical form strongly influenced by the piano, then with historically more faithful instruments. The revival was the joint work of performers, builders, and composers who wrote new harpsichord pieces. However the harpsichord never completely disappeared from the public eye as it was used through the mid-19th century for basso continuo because despite its low volume, it had considerable power to "cut through" the orchestra. The earliest revival efforts began in the mid-19th century due to its increasingly infrequent usage and there was concern that the instrument could become a forgotten relic of the past.

== Instruments ==
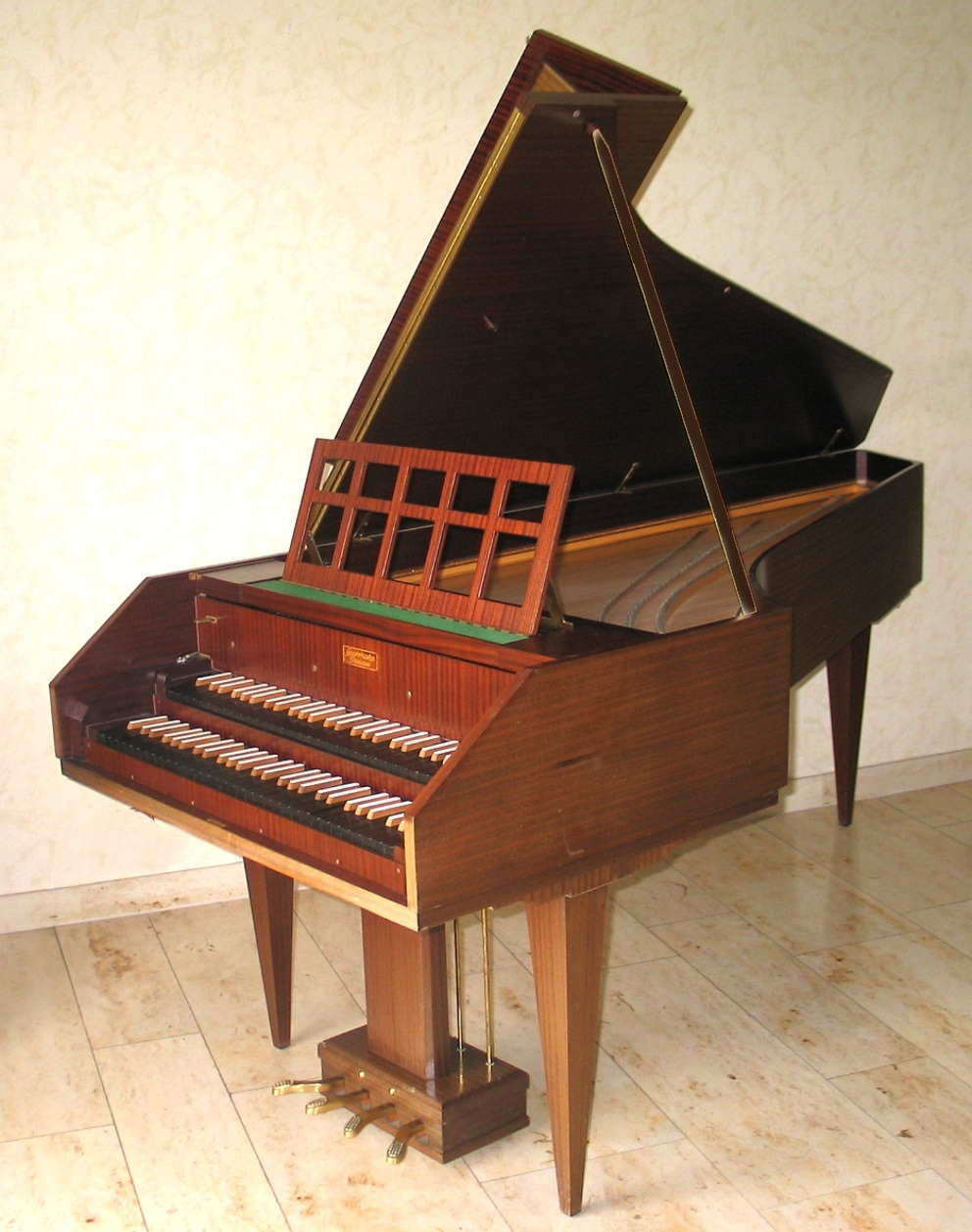
A heavy-framed mid-century harpsichord by the Sperrhake firm. Such instruments were harshly criticized during the 1960s by Zuckermann, who described their sound as feeble and their appearance as tubby, a betrayal of the tradition of beauty seen in historical instruments.

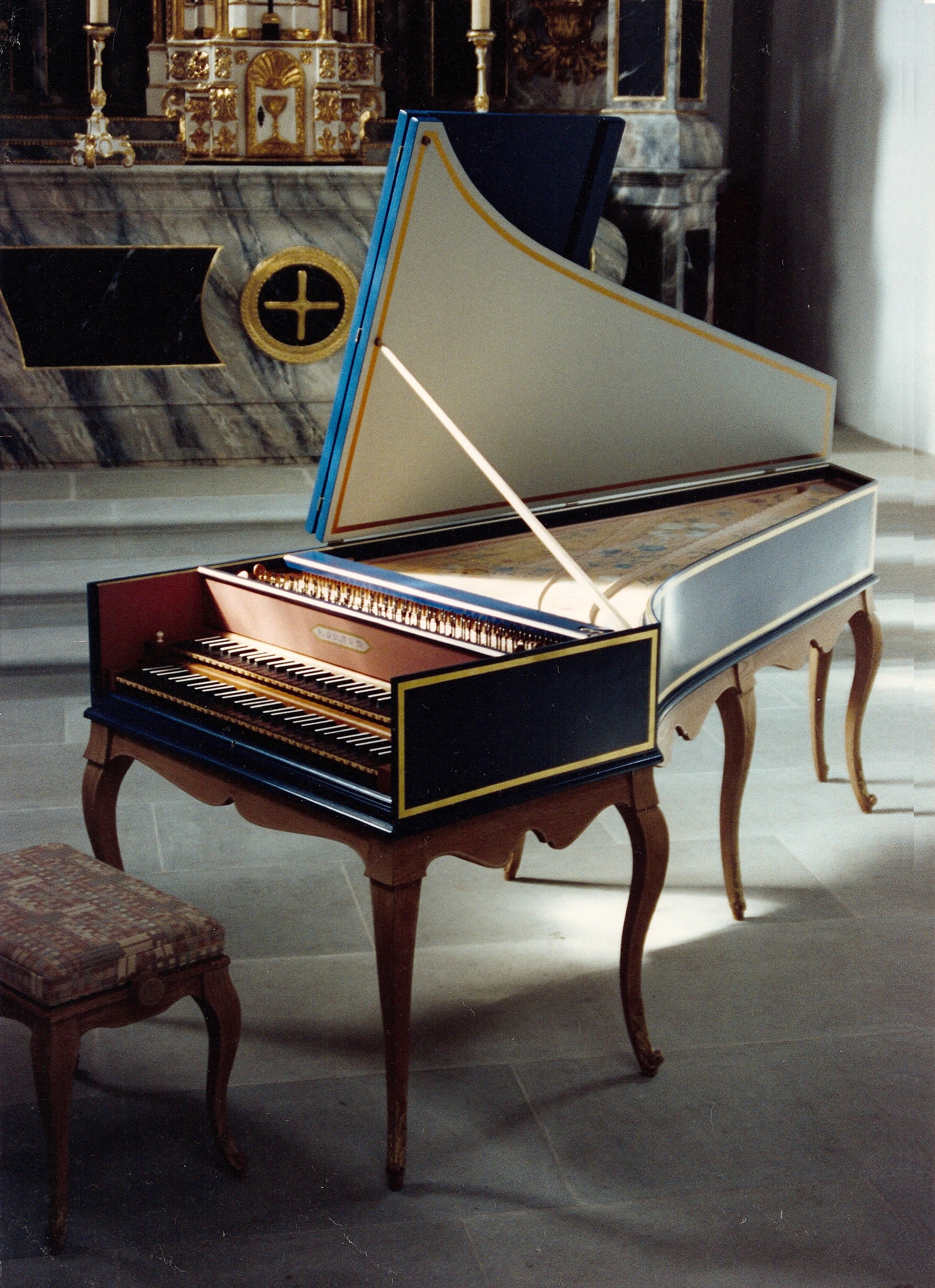
Harpsichords played today tend to follow closely the building practices established in the historical period. This modern instrument was built by Jean-Paul Rouaud based on a historical instrument made in 1707 by Nicolas Dumont.

In the earlier stages, 20th-century harpsichords were heavily influenced by the technology of the modern piano, and usually included metal framing (which was entirely absent in historical instruments). It was felt that such construction would increase the stability of tuning. Since heavy framing tends to stifle harpsichord sound, instruments were bolstered by other means, notably the addition of a 16' stop (an additional set of strings that played an octave below normal pitch); such stops were somewhat unusual in the historical period but became widespread in the first half of the 20th century. An example was the harpsichord produced by Pleyel et Cie at the request of Wanda Landowska.

Starting in the mid-20th century, instruments were introduced whose construction followed historical principles, with thinner cases, historical dispositions (arrangements of choirs of strings) and no metal framing. Among the leaders of this shift were Frank Hubbard, William Dowd, and Martin Skowroneck. With time, such instruments came to dominate the scene, and the older heavy-frame instruments are almost never manufactured today. They retain historical value, however, since they were the instruments that early to mid-20th-century composers had in mind when they wrote their works. Thus the Neupert firm still offers its mid-century "Bach" model for sale, defending it explicitly on the grounds of its suitability for 20th-century music.

The transition of harpsichord building toward historicist principles is covered in detail by Hubbard (1965), Zuckermann (1969), and Kottick (2003), cited below.

== Performers ==
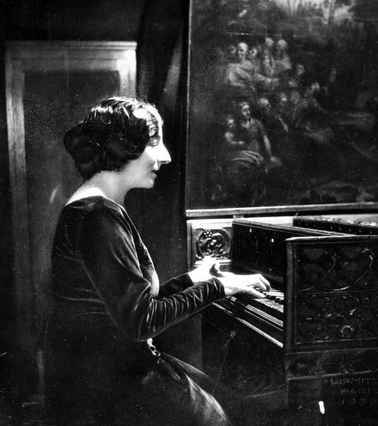
Wanda Landowska in 1937. Her highly successful career helped launch the harpsichord back into the musical mainstream.

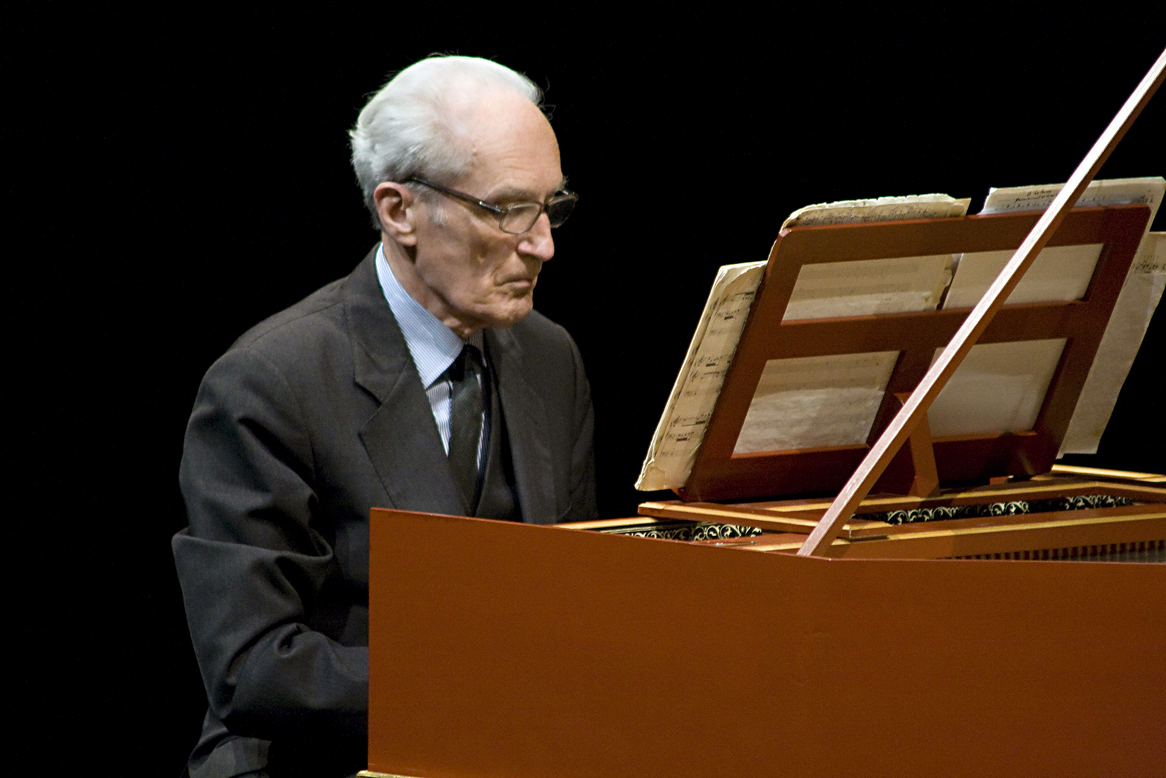
Gustav Leonhardt was an influential proponent of historically-informed instruments and performance practice.

Among the performers who propelled the revival of the harpsichord have been the following (listed by date of birth):

- Alfred James Hipkins (1826–1903)
- Arnold Dolmetsch (1858–1940)
- Violet Gordon-Woodhouse (1872–1948)
- Wanda Landowska (1879–1959)
- Eta Harich-Schneider (1894–1986)
- Yella Pessl (1907–1991)
- Frank Pelleg (1910–1968)
- Nancy Salas (1910–1990)
- Ralph Kirkpatrick (1911–1984)
- Isolde Ahlgrimm (1914–1995)
- George Malcolm (1917–1997)
- Thurston Dart (1921–1971)
- Fernando Valenti (1926–1990)
- Zuzana Růžičková (1927–2017)
- Gustav Leonhardt (1928–2012)
- Igor Kipnis (1930–2002)
- János Sebestyén (1931–2012)
- Martin Galling (b. 1935)
- Anthony Newman (b. 1941)
- Bob van Asperen (b. 1947)
- Davitt Moroney (b. 1950)
- Scott Ross (1951–1989)
- Jens Johansson (b. 1963)

Landowska and also Elisabeth Chojnacka (1939–2017) achieved particular reputations for the performance of new music for the harpsichord.

== Music written for the contemporary harpsichord ==
=== Classical music ===
In the 20th century, classical composers returned to the harpsichord as they sought out variation in the sounds available to them. Under the influence of Arnold Dolmetsch, the harpsichordists Violet Gordon-Woodhouse (1872–1951) and in France, Wanda Landowska (1879–1959), were at the forefront of the instrument's renaissance.

Harpsichord concertos were written by Francis Poulenc (the Concert champêtre, 1927–28), Manuel de Falla, Walter Leigh, Bertold Hummel, Henryk Mikołaj Górecki, Michael Nyman, Philip Glass and Viktor Kalabis. Bohuslav Martinů wrote both a concerto and a sonata for the instrument, and Elliott Carter's Double Concerto is scored for harpsichord, piano and two chamber orchestras. The Swiss composer Frank Martin also wrote a harpsichord concerto for chamber ensemble (1951), and the instrument featured in one of his most famous works, Petite symphonie concertante (1946).

György Ligeti wrote a small number of solo works for the instrument (including Continuum), and Henri Dutilleux's Les Citations (1991) is scored for harpsichord, oboe, double bass and percussions. Elliott Carter's Sonata for Flute, Oboe, Cello and Harpsichord (1952) and his Double Concerto For Piano, Harpsichord, and Two Chamber Orchestras (1961) explore the timbre possibilities of the modern harpsichord.

Iannis Xenakis is also one of the composers who have written for harpsichord, with works like A l'lle de Gorée for amplified harpsichord and chamber orchestra, Komboï and Oophaa for harpsichord (again amplified) and percussion, and the two solo works Khoai and Naama.

Josef Tal wrote Concerto for harpsichord & electronic music (1964), Three Compositions for recorder & harpsichord (1966) and Chamber Music (1982) for s-recorder, marimba & harpsichord. Both Dmitri Shostakovich (Hamlet, 1964) and Alfred Schnittke (Symphony No.8, 1994) wrote works that use the harpsichord as part of the orchestral texture. John Cage and Lejaren Hiller wrote HPSCHD (1969) for 1–7 harpsichords and 1–51 computer-generated tapes. John Zorn has also used harpsichord in works like Rituals (1998), Contes de Fées (1999), and La Machine de l'Etre (2000).

In the Preface to his piano collection Mikrokosmos, Béla Bartók suggests some ten pieces as being suitable for the harpsichord.

American composer Vincent Persichetti composed a number of sonatas for the harpsichord.

Benjamin Britten included harpsichord parts in his opera A Midsummer Night's Dream and his cantata Phaedra.

Harpsichordist Hendrik Bouman has composed pieces in the 17th- and 18th-century style, including works for solo harpsichord, harpsichord concerti, and other works that call for harpsichord continuo. Other contemporary composers writing new harpsichord music in period styles include Grant Colburn, and Fernando De Luca. Notable performers include Oscar Milani and Mario Raskin.

Works for harpsichord in the 21st century include Northern Irish composer Alan Mills's Two Cubist Inventions (2000 / 2013), Slovak composer Peter Machajdík's "Empty Cage" for solo harpsichord and "Déjà vu" for harpsichord and strings and French composer Karol Beffa's Suite (2008), Sarabande et Doubles (2015) and Destroy (2007) for harpsichord and string quartet. Ukrainian-American composer Leonid Hrabovsky wrote 12 Two-Part Inventions (2016). Asian American composer Asako Hirabayashi writes music for harpsichord, violin, and fortepiano that combine modern and classical melodies. Her CD, "The Harpsichord in the New Millennium", captures her aesthetic of combining traditional forms and genres with new timbres. Hirabayashi was awarded the 2018 Gold Medal Award from Global Music Awards 2018. Belarusian-American composer Nina Siniakova wrote "Gelidi riflessi" ("Frozen Reflections", 2018), a cycle for violin and harpsichord in three movements, inspired by black-and-white photographs of Venice in Winter.

=== Folk music ===
Seán Ó Riada used the harpsichord both for the soundtracks of film music, and for interpretations of the Irish harper Turlough O'Carolan during Riada's work with the band Ceoltóirí Chualann (later to become The Chieftains). Riada used harpsichord for the latter with the justification that the harpsichord best replicated the sound of the metal strings of the early Irish harp.

=== Popular music ===
The revival of the harpsichord spilled over into popular music. Its first appearance in jazz music happened around 1940, when pianist Johnny Guarnieri was asked to play a harpsichord in Artie Shaw's quintet "Gramercy Five". The band recorded eight albums between 1940 and 1945, which were reissued in 1990 (The Complete Gramercy Sessions).

In the 1960s and 1970s, the harpsichord was used by groups including the Beatles, the Beach Boys, the Rolling Stones, the Doors, the Jimi Hendrix Experience, the Kinks, the Monkees, the Partridge Family, the Mamas & the Papas, and Simon & Garfunkel. A great number of other artists since then have used harpsichord in their work such as Kate Bush, Björk, Joanna Newsom, Jacco Gardner, Jerry Lee Lewis, Elton John, Vampire Weekend, and Jens Johansson from Stratovarius.

On the 1977 album Rumours, Mick Fleetwood played an electric harpsichord on the song "Gold Dust Woman". The Stranglers' Golden Brown released in 1982, the second single in the album La folie, is noted for its distinctive harpsichord instrumentation.

The harpsichord also appeared in film and on television. For example, it appeared on the television show The Addams Family, played by Lurch. It appeared in the 1960s Miss Marple films featuring Margaret Rutherford and the cult shows The Prisoner and Danger Man.

The 2015 musical Hamilton prominently features a harpsichord in the song "You'll Be Back".

Soundtracks for the 2017 games Hollow Knight and Pyre both use the harpsichord.

Boys for Pele, the third album of American singer-songwriter Tori Amos, is notable for featuring the harpsichord as the main instrument on several songs, including the lead single "Caught a Lite Sneeze". 30 years later, the instrument returned on Amos' 2026 album In Times of Dragons.

== See also ==
- Contemporary music
