= Oophaa =

1989 chamber music composition by Iannis Xenakis

- Chamber music by Iannis Xenakis
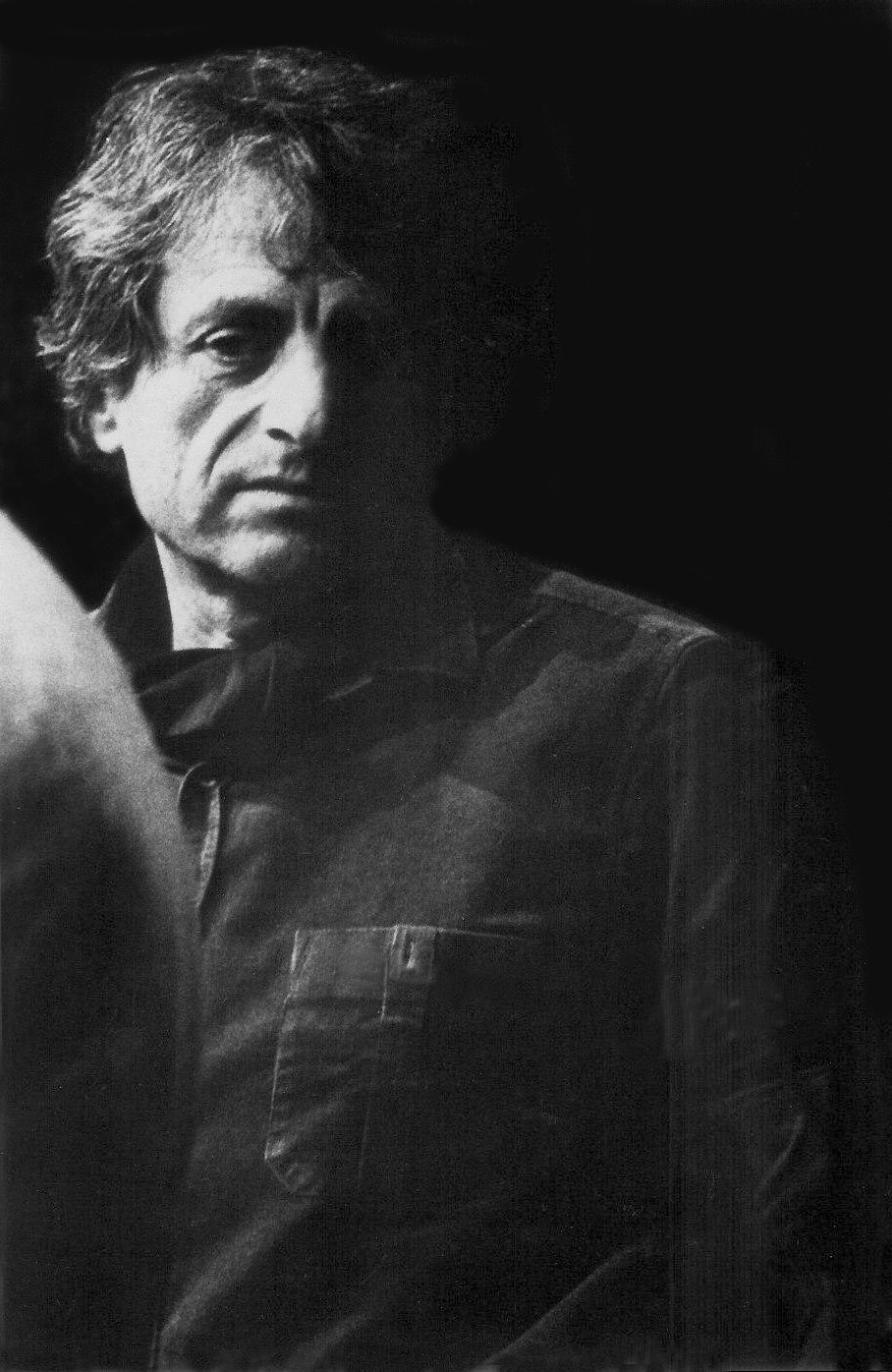
- Iannis Xenakis in 1975
- Composed: 1989
- Performed: 17 September 1989: Warsaw
- Published: 1989: Paris
- Scoring: Amplified harpsichord and percussion

Oophaa is a composition for amplified harpsichord and percussion by Iannis Xenakis, finished in 1989.

== Background ==
Oophaa was composed shortly after finishing Okho and marked Xenakis's return to the unusual chamber ensemble of harpsichord and percussion, after Komboï. According to Xenakis, its name is not based on lexical roots, but it is rather taken from individual phonemes. Scholar Andreas Kouras argues that it could be "a Greek exclamation used while dancing and celebrating". It premiered on September 17, 1989, at the Warsaw Autumn Festival, a venue that the composer visited frequently, where he also premiered a number of his previous works. It was first performed by the dedicatees of the piece, percussionist Sylvio Gualda and harpsichordist Elisabeth Chojnacka, who had been performing together as a duo in many modern music festivals at the time and commissioned many compositions for them after Komboï. It was published by Éditions Salabert later that year.

== Structure ==
Oophaa is in one movement and has a total duration of about nine minutes. The piece has a total length of 81 bars and starts with a tempo marking of 60 eighth notes per minute, although the tempo changes multiple times throughout the piece. It is scored for an amplified harpsichord and percussionist playing seven ceramic flower pots and seven skin instruments (bongos, three tom-toms, and two bass drums), meant to be placed in a wide fan-shaped layout. Xenakis specified that the percussion instruments should be as far apart from each other as possible, so that the difference in sound quality could be heard clearly. In terms of instrumentation, Oophaa's percussion part has a high degree of similarity to other chamber pieces with percussion, such as Dmaathen, Kassandra, Rebonds, or Plektó, which allows for performers to be able to use the same layout when performing several Xenakis's pieces live. The harpsichord part is composed of three layers of chord sounds.

Despite being the last harpsichord piece composed by Xenakis, it is one of his least challenging pieces for harpsichord: it is one of the pieces for chamber ensemble with the least polyrhythmic structures (only six 3:4 polyrhythmic cells can be found on the percussion side), the rhythm is practically steady through the whole piece (with tempo changes) and the harpsichordist part only includes chords. As in Komboï, the different chords and percussion combination of simultaneous sounds are meant to complement each other, creating sound saturation and complex, superimposed rhythmic material.

The piece also features several solo passages, both for the harpsichord and the percussion. The percussionist is also asked to play some skin-instrument fragments both with his hands and mallets. A practice that was commonplace among many of Xenakis's works, Oophaa was written as a manuscript with little regard to how the music would be performed in terms of practicality. This caused harpsichordist and frequent collaborator Elisabeth Chojnacka to state that, in order to play the piece, one should have "exceptionally" large hands, and the most common way to play the piece would be for the performer to either divide some chords and play them with both hands or rewrite the chords altogether. Chojnacka also stated that, upon tackling the piece, she chose not to take into account the many changes of register indicated in the score, and that the harpsichordist should feel free to take inspiration from them when attempting to play the piece, as a choice should be made by the performer whether to play them or not, given the extraordinary difficulty of Xenakis's output.

== Reception ==
Oophaa has not garnered much attention since its publication, probably because it is less technically demanding than the other harpsichord pieces and the structure is much simpler and devoid of dramatic construction. Critic James Harley described the timbral and harmonic aspects of Oophaa as "gamelan-like", remarking on Xenakis's interest in Javanese music, while noting the "Harry Partch-like ringing sonority of the ceramic flowerpots first used in Komboï ". On the other hand, scholar and harpsichordist Andreas Skouras feels the piece is slightly lacking "imagination and inspiration" and that "Oophaa is probably the most neglected" of Xenakis's harpsichord pieces.

== Recordings ==
Recordings of Oophaa are rare. Following is a list of notable recordings of the piece:

- The musicians who premiered the piece, Sylvio Gualda and Elisabeth Chojnacka recorded the piece in 1990 in Radio France under the label Accord. This recording was produced by Alain de Chambure, with sound engineer Myron Meerson.
- Percussionist Greg Stuart and harpsichordist John Mark Harris also recorded the piece at Warren Studios at the University of California, San Diego, in San Diego. The recording, produced by percussionist Steven Schick with sound engineer Josef Kucera, was released by Mode Records in 2006. A 1932 Pleyel harpsichord was used for this recording.
