= George Malcolm (musician) =

English keyboard player, composer and conductor (1917–1997)

George Malcolm

George John Malcolm CBE KSG (28 February 1917 – 10 October 1997) was an English pianist, organist, composer, harpsichordist, and conductor.

Malcolm's first instrument was the piano, and his first teacher was a nun who recognised his talent and recommended him to the Royal College of Music at the age of seven, where he studied under Kathleen McQuitty FRCM until he was 19. He attended Wimbledon College, and went on to study at Balliol College, Oxford in the 1930s.

During the Second World War he had a musical role with the RAF becoming a bandleader. After the War he completed his musical studies with Herbert Fryer. He bought a harpsichord at auction and went on to develop a career as a harpsichordist. He continued to make occasional appearances as a pianist, for example in Mozart's music for four hands and with the Dennis Brain Wind Ensemble (with whom he made one of his rare recordings as pianist in the first performance of the Gordon Jacob Sextet, written for the group). As a mentor, he also influenced a number of musicians not necessarily associated with the harpsichord such as András Schiff.

== Harpsichord career ==
During his lifetime "historically informed performance" changed, and compared to younger harpsichordists such as Trevor Pinnock, his style of playing may sound out-dated. Like Wanda Landowska, he favoured rather large "revival harpsichord"s with pedals, built in a modern style, that now are seen as "unauthentic" for Baroque music. However, his recordings and live performances introduced many people to the harpsichord. For example, his first recording of the Chromatic Fantasia and Fugue, BWV 903 was in 1954, a time when it was better known as a piano work, although it had been recorded by Landowska.

As well as Baroque works, he played modern harpsichord repertoire. His own composition "Bach before the Mast" (a humorous set of variations on The Sailor's Hornpipe in the style of Johann Sebastian Bach) was written as a B side for a cover version of the Alec Templeton number Bach goes to town which he released in the 1950s. He also wrote "Variations on a Theme of Mozart".

=== Collaborations with other harpsichordists ===
In the 1950s he participated in annual concerts featuring four harpsichordists, the three others being Thurston Dart, Denis Vaughan and Eileen Joyce. In 1957 this group also recorded two of Vivaldi's Concertos for Four Harpsichords, one in a Bach arrangement, with the Pro Arte Orchestra under Boris Ord. Malcolm, Dart and Joyce also recorded Bach's Concerto in C for Three Harpsichords. In 1967, he appeared with Eileen Joyce, Geoffrey Parsons and Simon Preston in a four-harpsichord concert with the Academy of St Martin in the Fields under Neville Marriner in the Royal Festival Hall.

== Organist and choir-master ==
He also pursued a notable career as an organist and choir-trainer. After serving as organist-choirmaster of St Mary's Roman Catholic Church in Clapham, he was Master of Music of Westminster Cathedral for 12 years (1947–1959). He developed the choir's forthright, full-throated tone—often, but rather vacuously described as "continental"—which contrasted with that of Anglican choirs at the time. Benjamin Britten praised the choir's 'staggering brilliance and authority', and proposed to write a piece for them. This resulted in the Missa Brevis (1959). Its first performance was one of Malcolm's last services at Westminster Cathedral before he retired on 1 September 1959. He continued to play the organ after retiring from Westminster Cathedral, and recorded the organ concertos of Handel with the Academy of St Martin in the Fields. Malcolm was founding patron of Spode Music Week, an annual residential music school that places particular emphasis on the music of the Roman Catholic liturgy. Malcolm also composed for voices, a well-known piece being his Palm Sunday introit Ingrediente Domino. His setting of Psalm 51 Miserere mei (composed in 1950, presumed lost but rediscovered in the Cathedral archives in 2011) is reminiscent of Ivor Atkins' 1951 version of Gregorio Allegri's Miserere.

A devout Roman Catholic, Malcolm was awarded papal honours for his services as Master of Music at Westminster Cathedral.

== Conducting ==
Benjamin Britten engaged Malcolm in 1960 to conduct the second and third performances of A Midsummer Night's Dream. In later life Malcolm developed a career as a conductor, forging long-standing relationships with ensembles such as the English Chamber Orchestra and the Northern Sinfonia orchestra. The pianist András Schiff, who left Hungary to study with Malcolm, was a frequent concerto soloist under his baton, and the two recorded Mozart's complete works for piano duet together on the composer's own piano.

== Burial and legacy ==
Malcolm was born and died in London. He is interred in the graveyard at St Nicholas Church, Saintbury, Gloucestershire.

Malcolm's centenary was marked by Balliol College in 2017.

=== Discography ===
In 1967, he recorded The Complete Harpsichord Works of Rameau (Argo Record Co, London).

== See also ==
- Millicent Silver
