= Orchestre symphonique de Paris =

Former French orchestra

The Orchestra Symphonique de Paris (Symphonic Orchestra of Paris) was an orchestra principally active in Paris from 1928 to 1939. The orchestra was co-founded by Ernest Ansermet, Louis Fourestier and Alfred Cortot and gave its first concert on 19 October 1928 at the Théâtre des Champs-Élysées.

The financial support for the orchestra came from wealthy sponsors such as Gustave Lyon, director of Pleyel, two banker Ménard brothers, and the Princess de Polignac. Members of the management board were Robert Lyon (general administrator), Charles Kiesgen (administrative secretary), André Schaeffner (artistic secretary) along with Henri Monnet and Jean Gehret. Financial difficulties forced the orchestra to become an association in mid 1931.

The aim of the new orchestra was to present less-known works of major composers as well as contemporary music and the central concert repertoire, playing to a high standard. The standard of the orchestra was considered to be high, partly due to the number of rehearsals before each concert. Of the eighty musicians chosen (out of 600 auditioned) the majority were under 25.

From 1929 Pierre Monteux was invited by Cortot to become closely involved with the orchestra as artistic director and principal conductor. Monteux made his debut with them on 12 April that year, conducting a major spring festival; at the end of the first season the orchestra had given 63 concerts. The season also saw the first recording by the orchestra (although referred to as ‘Grand Orchestra Symphonique’): the premiere recording in May of The Rite of Spring, conducted by Monteux, at the refurbished Salle Pleyel.

New works premiered by the orchestra included Honegger's Rugby in 1928, Capriccio for piano and orchestra in 1929 both under Ansermet, Poulenc’s Concert Champêtre (with Wanda Landowska), Prokofiev’s 3rd symphony under Monteux; as well as Paris premieres of Janáček's Sinfonietta and fragments from Berg’s Wozzeck.

The orchestra toured to Belgium and Holland in 1930, then in late 1931 to fifteen cities, including Hamburg, Cologne, Berlin, Dresden and Vienna; in 1932 to Brussels and in 1933 to Geneva. Other recordings with the orchestra include Ravel's La Valse, Berlioz's Symphonie Fantastique, the Bach Double Concerto (with Menuhin and Enescu), and Fête Polonaise from Le roi malgré lui under Monteux, the Symphonie Espagnole under Coppola, works by Gaubert conducted by the composer, Soviet music (Shostakovich, Alexander Mosolov, Yuliy Meitus) conducted by Julius Ehrlich, as well as Bach played by Cortot.
