= Hendrik Bouman =

Dutch composer

Hendrik "Henk" Bouman (born 29 September 1951, in Dordrecht) is a Dutch harpsichordist, fortepianist, conductor and composer of music written in the baroque and classical idioms of the 17th and 18th century.

== Biography ==
In the late '70s, Hendrik Bouman studied at the Amsterdam Conservatory with several of the pioneers of the baroque revival, notably Ton Koopman and Lucie van Dael, and followed masterclasses, with Gustav Leonhardt, Nikolaus Harnoncourt and Max van Egmond. He was principal harpsichordist of the baroque ensemble Musica Antiqua Köln from 1976 to 1983, with whom he toured worldwide under the auspices of the Goethe Institute and recorded extensively for DGG Archiv and numerous European radio stations.

Formerly professor of harpsichord and fortepiano at Concordia University and the Université Laval in Quebec, Hendrik Bouman also taught historically informed performance practice and chamber ensemble. He has given masterclasses in Europe, Canada, United States of America, South America, Mexico and India. Since 2012 Hendrik Bouman guides young ‘baroque and classical composers’ aspiring to attain mastery in their art. In 2016 he was invited by Académie de Musique Rainier III in Monaco to give a series of masterclasses on improvisation in baroque style.

Bouman first introduced baroque improvisation into his recital in 1993 at the Festival Domaine Forget in Quebec at the request of Radio Canada and his baroque compositions in a broadcast by CBCTV 'Compass' in Maritimes Canada in 1994. The CBC/Radio Canada – Toronto, Moncton, Halifax and CBCTV Halifax and ATV Halifax Canada have broadcast numerous 'live' premiere performances of his works as well as 14 feature portraits.

He has made 16 transcriptions of works by François Couperin, Jean-Philippe Rameau, Georg Philipp Telemann, and J. S. Bach, including two Brandenburg Concerti in a version for two harpsichords and an orchestration of Bach's Italian Concerto as well as several adaptations in baroque style of Christmas Carols commissioned and recorded by the Canadian Broadcasting Corporation (CBC Radio Charlottetown) in 1994. Schott has published some of his basso continuo realisations.

He made his conducting debut in the première of the mass by Alain Pierard at the Basilique Notre-Dame de Montréal in 1985. The following year he founded the period orchestra Les Nations de Montréal, which he directed in 1987 in the 20th-century premiere of the opera Amadis de Gaule for the tricentenary of Lully with soloists and choir of the Atélier de l'Opéra de l'Université Laval. The concert was broadcast 'live' by Radio Canada and subsequently by Radio France and Swiss Radio. He directed his orchestra in programmes of 18th Century music for a public of 5000 in the prestigious Concerts Populaire d'Été de la Ville de Montréal. He made his American conducting debut with the Portland Baroque Orchestra and Choir in performances of Handel's Messiah in 1990.

He received several grants from Canada, Italy and France for his innovative work as composer-performer of period music and as founding-director of the Festivals: Rendez-vous con Hendrik Bouman (Italy) 1992, Halifax 1749 Baroque (Canada) 1999, Baroque by the Sea (Maritimes Canada) 1999 and 2005, the Baroque SaMuse Concert Series (Montréal, Canada) 2006–2007, as well as a sponsorship from Berkeley Homes, United Kingdom for his Baroque by the Sea Concert Series (Sussex, United Kingdom) 2009; concert series predominantly dedicated to the performance of his baroque and classical compositions, period improvisations, as well as historical repertoire and his transcriptions thereof.

During his career Hendrik Bouman has appeared in duo with renowned artists: Nancy Argenta, Hajo Bäss, Brian Berryman, Max van Egmond, Reinhard Goebel, Wilbert Hazelzet, Grégoire Jeay, Matthew Jennjohn, Mireille Lagacé, Marie Leonhardt, Jaap ter Linden, Matthias Maute, Susie Napper, Heiko ter Schegget, Simon Standage, Carolyn Watkinson and Ifan Williams. He has also collaborated with renowned conductors and soloists Rossana Bertini, Iván Fischer, Philippe Herreweghe, Christopher Jackson, Emma Kirkby, Ton and Tini Koopman, Jeanne Lamon, Gino Mangiocavalli, Nigel Rogers and Michael Schopper. In the 2016-2017 Chamber music series of the Opera de Nice he plays in concert duos with the concert master violinist Reine-Brigette Sulem.

Hendrik Bouman has received many awards for his 25 recordings of which there are more than 45 re-editions, for DGG/Archiv, EMI, REM/Radio Canada, Baroque-Nouveau, notably: the Edison Prize (Netherlands), 3 Deutscher Schallplattenpreis, Artist of the Year by the Deutsche Phono-Akademie and the career Prize for Young Artists from the Federal State of North Rhine-Westphalia (Germany), Le Grand Prix National du Disque, 6 Diapason d'Or, Répertoire Recommandé, 9-Repertoire; Diapason 5 (France), and the Early Music Award, Gramophone Award (England). He was recipient of the Canadian composers' SOCAN Foundation's CD Award, for the distribution to radio-broadcasters worldwide of his CDs Little Notebook for Anna I & II, on which he plays his harpsichord and piano compositions. In 2011 ARYA released Hendrik Bouman's "5 Baroque Concertos for Anna" performed by The Baroque Muse of which Bouman is the founding director and Simon Standage the leader (concert master).

Hendrik Bouman has lived in his native Netherlands, and in Germany, Italy, France, Quebec, Maritimes Canada and India. Since 2012 he lives with his wife and children on the Côte d'Azur in France. He speaks French, English, Italian, German and Dutch. He is an avid sailor and cartoonist.

== Activity as a composer ==
In 1993, with over 18 years as performer, researcher and professor in early music, Hendrik Bouman embarked on the composition of new music in baroque and classical idioms according to the standards of the 17th and 18th century. This was for him a natural development of the ongoing revival of baroque music. In creating his new period style compositions, he employs various European national idioms and their many typical forms such as the sonata, concerto, ouverture and fugue. He first played his contemporary 'baroque' music in South Africa in January 1994 and his harpsichord solos were first recorded by the Canadian Broadcasting Corporation in December that year.

He has composed over 120 works in 17th and 18th century style for harpsichord; piano; clavichord; organ; violin solo; viola solo; flute solo; recorder solo cello solo; as well as quartets; trios; duets; sonatas; ouvertures; concerto grossos; harpsichord concertos; violin concerto; recorder concerto; flute concerto; oboe concerto; cello concerto; music for baroque theatre and choir and a classical symphony.

Concerts dedicated to Hendrik Bouman's compositions have been broadcast by CBC and Radio Canada in Toronto, Halifax, Moncton, Charlottetown and by ATV and CBCTV Maritimes, DT-Danish National Radio and Radio France/France Musiques. His Menuet du Matin dedicated to Prince Willem Alexander of the Netherlands was chosen as a theme of Radio Canada's Les Bonheurs de Sophie in 1998, and CBC TV News broadcast his composition HRH Princess Diana's Ground, as tribute on September 2, 1997. France Musique broadcast on Easter day 2003 his improvisations in baroque style recorded in a live performance on the Ruckers-Taskin harpsichord in the Musée de la Cité de la Musique in Paris. On Christmas Day 2015 an hour's feature programme on Fine Music Classical music radio in Sydney Australia is dedicated to Hendrik Bouman's compositions.

He has premiered over 2/3 of his compositions in France, the Netherlands, Belgium, England, Canada, India and South Africa and his works have also been performed in Italy, Germany Sweden and the USA. He has premiered his orchestral and chamber music with his ensembles Concerto Felice, Baroque SaMuse and The Baroque Muse which he founded in 2009. He has performed his works also in solo recitals, in trio and in duo with flutists Brian Berryman and Grégoire Jeay; recorder players Heiko ter Schegget, Matthias Maute, Sophie Larivière, and Ambikaprasad Mallik; oboist Matthew Jennejohn; violinists Hajo Bäss, and Simon Standage; viol player Susie Napper; cellists Tormod Dalen and Ifan Williams. Hajo Bäss has premiered the Fantaisie pour violon seul, which was composed for him in 1999. Bouman premiered with Simon Standage the "Classical Sonate for Violin and Piano in Bflat major" which he composed for him in 2008. Bouman composed the music (which he directed from the harpsichord) for a production of Molière's Le Malade Imaginaire in Auroville, India in 2006. In March 2009 he inaugurated his concert series Baroque by the Sea, Eastbourne in the United Kingdom. In Brighton, Sussex, in the United Kingdom in November 2009 he premiered with his ensemble The Baroque Muse his compositions "Harpsichord Concerto in D major" – soloist Hendrik Bouman, "Flute Concerto in E minor" – soloist and dedicatee Grégoire Jeay, "Violin Concerto in D major" – soloist and dedicatee Simon Standage, "Cello Concerto in A minor" – soloist Tormod Dalen, and "Recorder Concerto in C major" – soloist Heiko ter Schegget.

In August 2011 Hendrik Bouman directed members of the Orchestra of the Eighteenth Century in the premiere of his Concerto Grosso in G major - "La Festa di Lucia" which was commissioned to honour the Dutch violinist, Lucy van Dael, co-founder and formerly, leader of the Orchestra of the Eighteenth Century and professor at the Amsterdam Conservatory and the Royal Conservatory of The Hague.

His two CDs of solo compositions for harpsichord and piano dedicated to his wife Anna, Little Notebook for Anna I & II, were released in 1998 and distributed to radio-broadcasters worldwide by the SOCAN foundation (Canadian composers). In 2011 the CD, "5 Baroque Concertos for Anna", of Bouman's compositions, recorded by The Baroque Muse under Bouman's direction at Viscount Gage's ancestral manoir Firle Place in Sussex United Kingdom, was released on his label Arya. Subsequently, Arya released the CDs: "2nd Notebook for Anna" of Bouman's 18th Century classical compositions which he performs on a Fazioli piano of the Ville de Montréal; the "3rd Notebook for Anna" of Bouman's 18th Century classical compositions he performs on a fortepiano, the "4th Notebook for Anna" of his harpsichord compositions he performs on his double manual harpsichord he designed and built in 2006, and the "5th Notebook for Anna" of his harpsichord compositions recorded on his double harpsichord following his recital in Saint-Jean-Cap-Ferrat in 2015. The CD "7 Baroque Solos for Anna" featuring Bouman's solos compositions for a variety of instruments recorded by Bouman and his colleagues / soloists of his ensemble Barque SaMuse (The Baroque Muse) in Firle Place and Berwick Church in Sussex, England will be released in 2017.

Hendrik Bouman is the first renowned composer/performer of baroque music in two centuries to design and build the harpsichords on which he plays in concerts and recordings.

He is a member of the British Harpsichord Society, Société des auteurs, compositeurs et éditeurs de musique SACEM - composer rights (France), ADAMI - solo performance rights (France), SPEDIDAM - ensemble performance rights (France) and SDRM - CD mechanical recording rights (France) as well as being a member of the period composers' guild, Vox Saeculorum.
