= Aimée Van de Wiele =

Belgian composer (1907–1991)

Aimée Van de Wiele (8 March 1907 – 2 November 1991) was a Belgian keyboardist and composer, born in Brussels. She began her music studies at the Brussels Conservatory, where she studied with E. Bosquet and won the Laure van Cutsem prize for piano, as well as prizes for harmony, counterpoint, composition, and music theory. Wiele then moved to France to study harpsichord at the Paris Conservatory with Wanda Landowska and musicology with Andre Pirro. After Landowska's death in 1959, Wiele began teaching at the Paris Conservatory, where she had several notable students, including Elisabeth Chojnacka and Marketta Valve.

Wiele's compositions include "Poem," a piece for orchestra, as well as inventions for harpsichord, piano pieces, and transcriptions of various cantatas and sonatas for keyboard. However, she is best remembered today as a performer.

Wiele gave solo recitals on harpsichord and performed with orchestras in Belgium, England, France, Italy, and the United States on harpsichord, piano, and organ. She was well known for her interpretations of Bach (particularly the Goldberg Variations) and Couperin, and especially praised for her performance of Poulenc's Concerto Champetre. Poulenc had originally composed the piece for Landowska, who performed it frequently. After Landowska's death, Wiele followed in her teacher's footsteps and received wide acclaim for her performance.

In 1965, Wiele served as a judge for the first international harpsichord competition as part of the Musica Antiqua Festival in Bruges, Belgium. She was also a member of the American Society of Composers, Authors, and Publishers (ASCAP).

Several of Wiele's recordings can be heard on Youtube.com. Her recordings (LP and CD) include:

Bach Goldberg Variations (Calliope)

Concert Champêtre for harpsichord and orchestra by Francis Poulenc (EMI Classics)

Le Livre D'Or Du Clavecin (MusicDisc)

Les Fastes De La Grande Et Ancienne Menestrandise – Couperin (Nonesuch)

Rameau Keyboard Works (Discophiles Français)
