= Keyboard concerto =

Keyboard concerto refers to a concerto for one or more keyboard instruments, usually with an orchestral accompaniment.

Types of keyboard concertos include:

- Harpsichord concerto
- Organ concerto
- Piano concerto
