= Xenakis Ensemble =

Dutch contemporary classical ensemble

The Xenakis Ensemble is a Dutch music ensemble dedicated to the performance of contemporary classical music. Based in Middelburg, it is known as one of the few ensembles specializing in the works of the composer Iannis Xenakis. It is frequently conducted by Diego Masson, who conducted the performances of many of Xenakis's works, as well as other guest conductors including Huub Kerstens. Its concertmaster is Mifune Tsuji.

The group was founded in 1980, at the initiative of the foundation Nieuwe MUZIEK Zeeland of Middelburg and the pianist Geoffrey Douglas Madge, with the approval of the composer Iannis Xenakis. Co-founder Ad van 't Veer died in June 2021.

Its repertoire includes over 40 compositions by Xenakis, some of which were written for the group (e.g., the 1986 À l'île de Gorée for amplified harpsichord and twelve musicians). The ensemble also performs recent works by Luca Francesconi, Morton Feldman, Willem Breuker, Jin Hi Kim, Huib Emmer, and Bunita Marcus.

The Xenakis Ensemble has released several CDs of the music of Iannis Xenakis (one in collaboration with the harpsichordist Elisabeth Chojnacka), as well as several other composers.

== Discography ==
- 1990 – Iannis Xenakis (Musifrance 2292–45030–2)
- 1995 – Xenakis Ensemble Live (BVHaast 9219)
- 1998 – Xenakis Ensemble (Bvhaast 9805)
- 1999 – Xenakis Ensemble (BVHaast 9903)
- 2000 – Xenakis - Orchestral & Chamber Works (Ultima). 2-CD set

== See also ==
- Iannis Xenakis
