= Joseph Bonnet =

French composer and organist

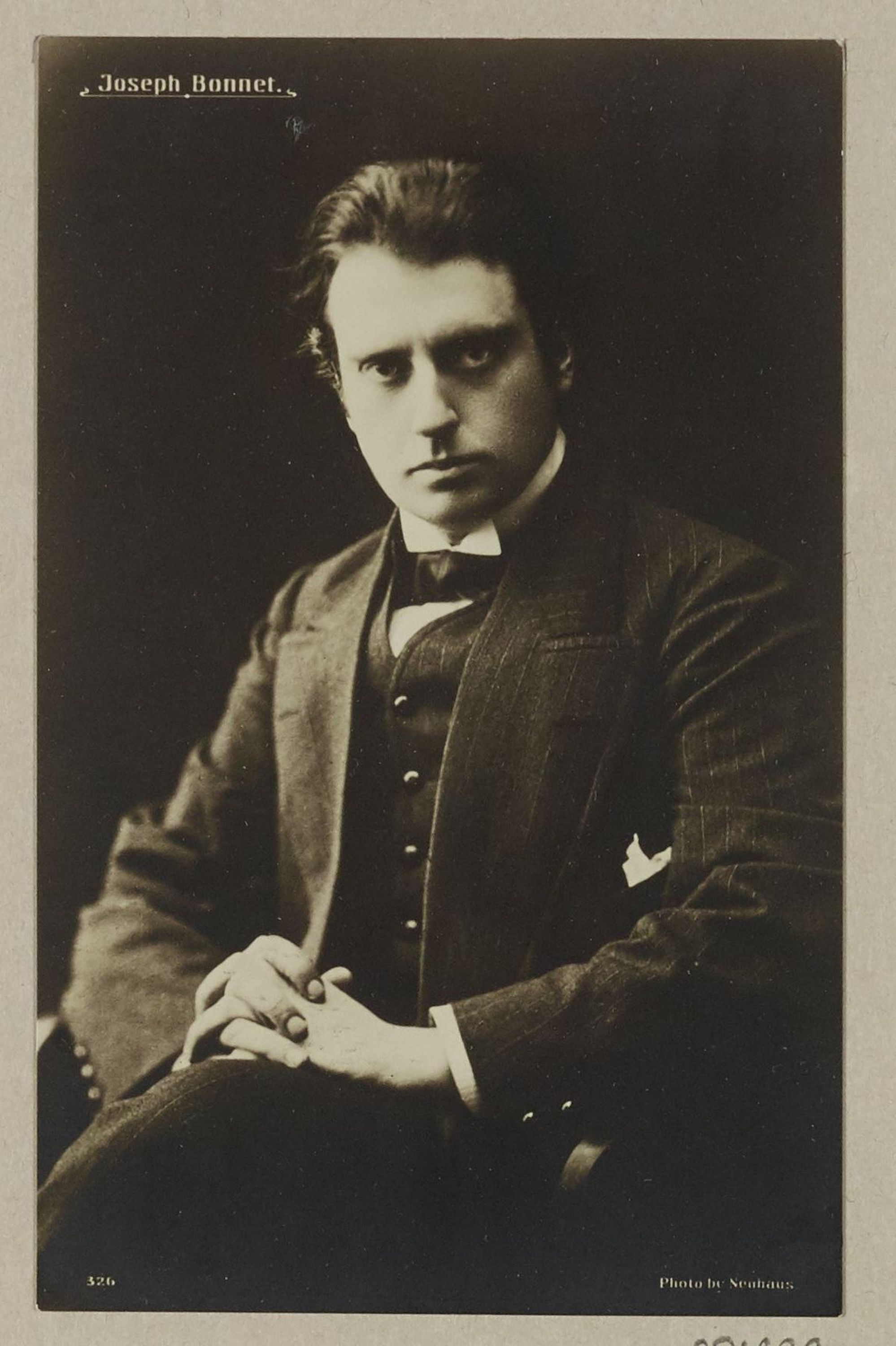
- Born: 17 March 1884; Bordeaux, France
- Died: 2 August 1944 (aged 60); Sainte-Luce-sur-Mer, Quebec, Canada

Joseph Élie Georges-Marie Bonnet (French: [ʒozɛf bɔnɛ]; 17 March 1884 – 2 August 1944) was a French composer and organist.

== Biography ==
One of the major French pipe organists, Joseph Bonnet was born in Bordeaux. He first studied with his father, an organist at St. Eulalie. At the age of 14, he became official organist, first at St. Nicholas and almost immediately at St. Michael. Bonnet also attended classes with Alexandre Guilmant at the Conservatoire de Paris. A few years later he finished with a first prize and, in 1906 was selected to become the organist at St. Eustache, Paris. In 1911 he had the privilege of succeeding Guilmant as concert organist at the conservatoire. He was actively teaching at this time and one of his notable students from his earlier years was Canadian organist Henri Gagnon.

On 28 January 1917 he moved to the United States, where he gave more than 100 concerts around the country until 1919. He was elected an honorary member of Phi Mu Alpha Sinfonia music fraternity in June 1917. Bonnet founded the organ department of the Eastman School of Music in 1921. He composed a large number of organ pieces and compiled the six-volume Historical Organ Recitals.

A few years later, Bonnet returned to Paris, where Denise Restout attended one of his master classes in 1933. Four years later, he took Louis Vierne's position as organ teacher and specialist at L’École César-Franck.

In 1940, due to the outbreak of World War II, he was forced to leave France and returned to North America. He was organist at the Worcester Art Museum 1942–1943 and was appointed professor at the Conservatoire de musique du Québec à Montréal in 1943. In Paris Bonnet had taught a student from Québec named Conrad Bernier who studied with him 1923–1926, who eventually became one of the premier advocates of French organ music in the United States as both professor of organ and head of the Organ Department at Catholic University of America.

Bonnet died on 2 August 1944, while vacationing in St. Luce-sur-Mer, near Rimouski, Quebec. He is buried at the Benedictine Abbey of Saint-Benoît-du-Lac, near Magog (Québec).

== Opus list ==
Opus	Title	Publication date	Scoring	Notes
1	Variations de concert	1908	Organ	à M. Clarence Eddy
2	Ave Maria	1908	4-part mixed chorus and organ	à mon ami Maurice Emmanuel, maître de chapelle à Sainte-Clotilde
3	Poèmes d’automne: 1. Lied des chrysanthèmes 2. Matin provençal 3. Poème du soir	1908	Organ	1. à mon cher maître Alexandre Guilmant; 2. à M. William C. Carl; 3. à M. & Mme Charles Tournemire
4	Unknown			
5	Douze pièces pour grand-orgue, Vol. 1: 1. Prélude; 2. Lamento; 3. Toccata; 4. Nocturne; 5. Ave Maris Stella; 6. Rêverie; 7. Intermezzo; 8. Fantaisie sur deux Noëls; 9. Épithalame; 10. Légende symphonique 11. Canzona; 12. Rhapsodie catalane	1909	Organ	1. à M. Alfred Sittard; 2. à la mémoire vénérée de Mme Alex. Guilmant; 3. à M. Enrico Bossi; 4. à M. Paul Combes; 5. à mes chers parents 6. à M. Jean Huré; 7. à M. Edwin A. Kraft; 8. à M. R. Meyrick-Roberts; 9. à M. et Mme Hubert Broussault; 10. à M. Karl Straube; 11. à M. Albert Schweitzer; 12. à M. Charles Galloway
6	1. Agnus Dei; 2. 2ème Ave Maria; 3. (No title)	1910	1. Three voices, baritone solo, and organ 2. Voice and organ 3. Four voices and organ or harmonium	1. à M. l’abbé Lassier, curé de Saint-Eustache; 2. à Melle Germaine Bonnet; 3. à M. l'Abbé Pottier, curé de Notre-Dame de Lourdes à Paris
7	Douze pièces nouvelles pour grand-orgue, Vol. 2: 1. Dédicace; 2. Étude de concert 3. Clair de lune 4. Stella Matutina; 5. Songe d’enfant 6. Chant du printemps 7. Prélude au Salve Regina; 8. Romance sans paroles 9. Pastorale; 10. Deuxième légende 11. Elfes; 12. Caprice héroique	1910	Organ	1. à Mme Douglas Fitch; 2. à M. L. Vilain; 3. à Mme la Baronne de Froment de Vassal; 4. à M. Max Schlochow; 5. à M. l’abbé Callier; 6. à M. Karl Heyse; 7. à Mme la Princesse Edmond de Polignac; 8. à M. Breitenbach; 9. à M. Otto Barblan; 10. à M. Paul Fournier; 11. à M. Ludwig Schmidthauer; 12. au Docteur J. Kendrick Pyne
8	1. Pater Noster; 2. Pie Jesu	Unknown	1. Tenor solo and organ 2. Solo voice and organ	1. à la Schola de Saint-Pierre d’Avensan (Medoc); 2. à la mémoire de mon vénéré maître Alex. Guilmant
9	Unknown			
10	Douze pièces pour grand-orgue, Vol. 3: 1. In Memoriam Titanic; 2. Ariel; 3. Méditation; 4. Moment musical 5. Consolation; 6. Berceuse; 7. Magnificat; 8. Chaconne; 9. Paysage; 10. Angelus du soir 11. Interludes; 12. Pisen Ceskeho Naroda poème tchèque	1913	Organ	1. to the memory of the Titanic’s heroes 2. to Mr. H. Matthias Turton; 3. to Mr. W. Ray Burroughs; 4. à Melle M. Sulzbach; 5. au Comte Bérenger de Miramon; 6. au Marquis Melchior de Polignac; 7. à M. et Mme Douglas Fitch; 8. to Professor Samuel A. Baldwin; 9. to Mr. Reginald Waddy; 10. to Mr. Joseph C. Beebe; 11. à la Comtesse et au Comte Amédée de Vallombrosa; 12. à la Ville de Prague
No opus	Chant triste	1925		à la mémoire de Joachim Gasquet

== Sources ==
- William Self, For Mine Eyes Have Seen (Worcester, Massachusetts: Worcester Chapter of the American Guild of Organists, 1990)
- Norbert Durourcq, La musique d'orgue française, 1949

== Free scores ==
- Free scores by Joseph Bonnet at the International Music Score Library Project (IMSLP)
- Poèmes d’automne: trois morceaux de concert ou de salon pour grand-orgue, op. 3 (From the Sibley Music Library Digital Score Collection)
- Variations de concert: pour grand-orgue, op 1 (From the Sibley Music Library Digital Score Collection)
- Historical organ-recitals: in six volumes / collected, edited and annotated by Joseph Bonnet (From the Sibley Music Library Digital Score Collection)
- Free scores by Joseph Bonnet in the Choral Public Domain Library (ChoralWiki)
