= Concert champêtre =

Harpsichord concerto by Francis Poulenc

- Harpsichord concerto by Francis Poulenc
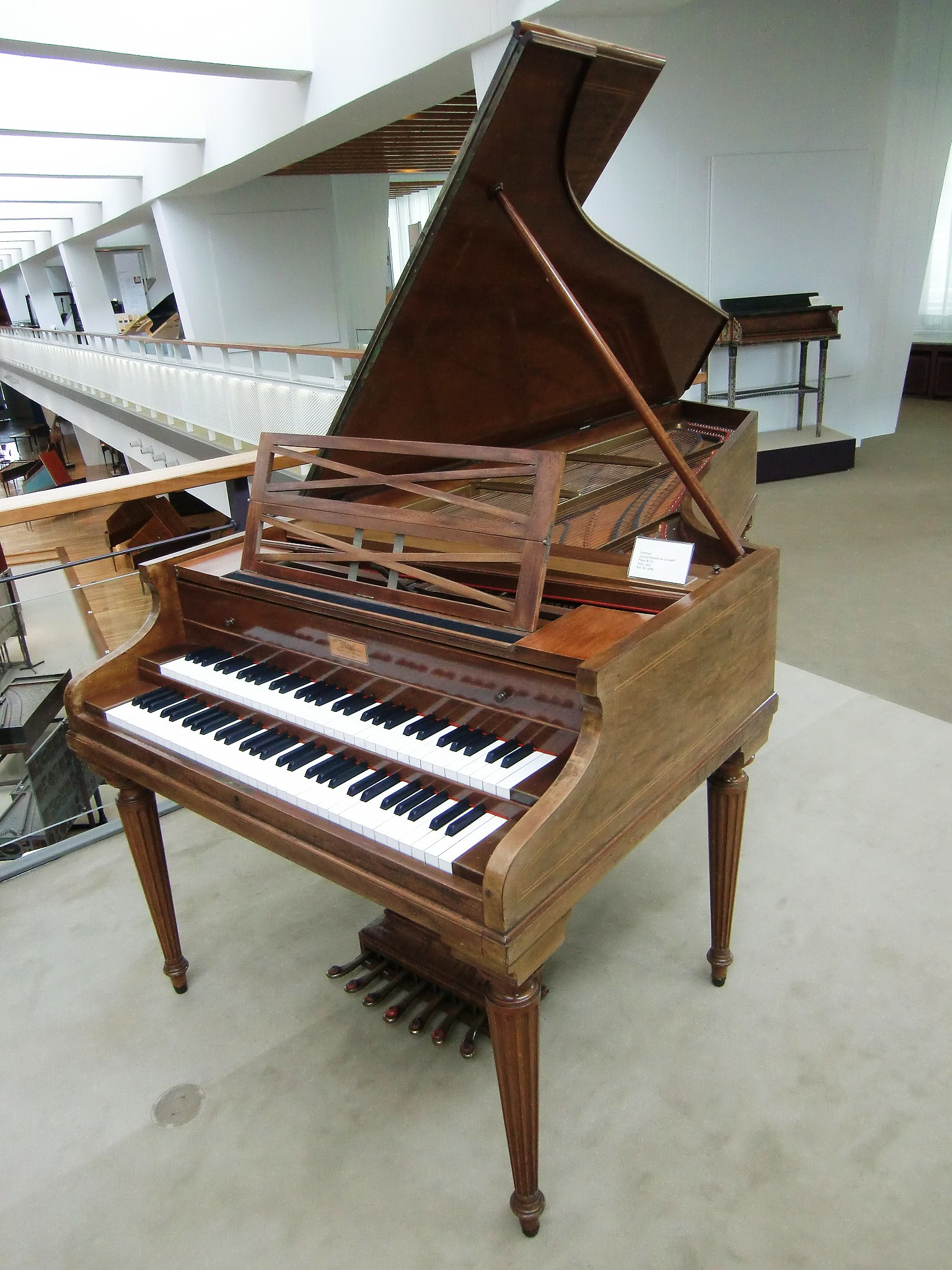
- The favourite Pleyel harpsichord of Wanda Landowska, for whom the piece was composed
- English: Pastoral Concerto
- Catalogue: FP 49
- Composed: 1927–28
- Duration: 25 min
- Movements: 3
- Scoring: Harpsichord; orchestra

Premiere
- Date: 3 May 1929
- Location: Salle Pleyel in Paris
- Conductor: Pierre Monteux
- Performers: Wanda Landowska, Orchestre Symphonique de Paris

Concert champêtre (French: [kɔ̃sɛʁ ʃɑ̃pɛtʁ], Pastoral Concerto), FP 49, is a harpsichord concerto by Francis Poulenc, which also exists in a version for piano solo with very slight changes in the solo part.

A typical performance of the piece lasts around 25 minutes.

== Background ==
Concert champêtre was written in 1927–28 for the harpsichordist Wanda Landowska who said she "adored" playing it as it made her "insouciant and gay!" Landowska was responsible for the composition of several other new pieces of music for the instrument, notably Manuel de Falla's harpsichord concerto and his El retablo de Maese Pedro (at the premiere of which, at the salon of Winnaretta Singer, Poulenc and Landowska met for the first time).

Like many harpsichord works from the 20th century, this piece was written for the 'revival' Pleyel contemporary harpsichord, with metal frame, pedals, leather plectra and heavy touch, which was prevalent at the time, rather than historic instruments from the 17th and 18th century. However, Trevor Pinnock has played and recorded it on a 3-manual Hass instrument with disposition 16' 8' 8 ' 4' 2', lute, 2 buffs, 2 couplers.

After a private performance in which Poulenc played the orchestral parts on the piano, the piece's public premiere was on May 3, 1929 at the Salle Pleyel in Paris, with Landowska playing the solo part and the Orchestre Symphonique de Paris conducted by Pierre Monteux.

== Music ==
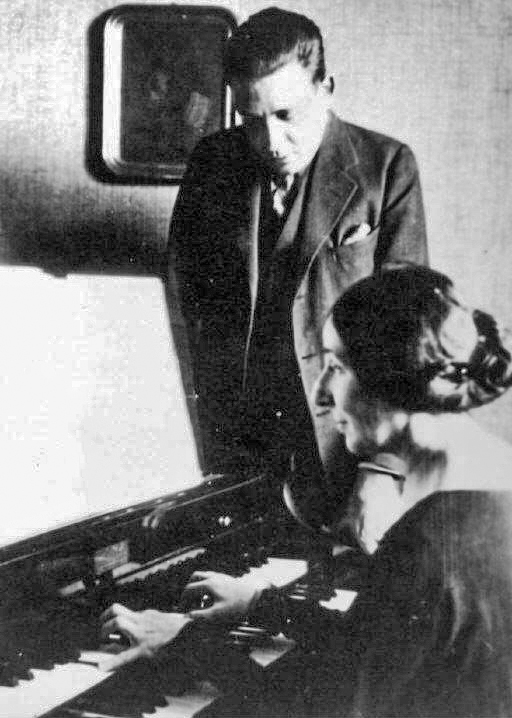
Poulenc and Landowska

The piece is in three movements:

1. Allegro molto – Adagio – Allegro molto
2. Andante: Mouvement de Sicilienne
3. Finale: Presto très gai

The piece alludes to music of the Baroque period, when the harpsichord was a common instrument, both in terms of its melodic and harmonic language and in its structure. It is for this reason, as well as the plain influence of Stravinsky's music of the same period, that the Concert and its slightly later companion work, the Aubade for piano and orchestra, are regarded as neoclassical compositions.

The work is scored for an orchestra of two flutes, piccolo, two oboes, cor anglais, two clarinets, two bassoons, four horns, two trumpets, trombone, tuba, percussion (timpani, side drums with and without snares, tambourine, triangle, bass drum, cymbals, and xylophone) and strings (the usual two sections of violins, violas, cellos and double basses—Poulenc stipulates eight each of first and second violins, and four each of violas, cellos and basses).

== Recordings ==
A recording of Poulenc himself playing the work, but on the piano, with the New York Philharmonic conducted by Dimitri Mitropoulos on 14 November 1948, was issued in 1998 as part of a 10-CD survey of historic broadcast recordings by that orchestra.

== Bibliography ==
- Schmidt, Carl B. (1995). The Music of Francis Poulenc (1899–1963): A Catalogue. Oxford: Clarendon Press. ISBN 9780191585166.
