= Ad van 't Veer =

Dutch music director and music group founder (1941–2021)

- Born: 1941; Goes, Netherlands
- Died: 21 June 2021 (aged 80); Middelburg, Netherlands
- Occupations: music director and music group founder

Ad van 't Veer (24 February 1941 – 21 June 2021) was a Dutch music director and music group co-founder.

Van 't Veer was a main person from 1976 behind "Festival Nieuwe Muziek", a main music festival in Middelburg. He was co-founder of the music group Xenakis Ensemble. From 1984 he was director of the "Stichting Nieuwe Muziek Zeeland" (translated: New Music Zeeland Foundation), for which he remained active until his retirement.

Van 't Veer died on 21 June 2021, aged 80.
