= Komboï =

1981 stochastic composition by Iannis Xenakis

- by Iannis Xenakis
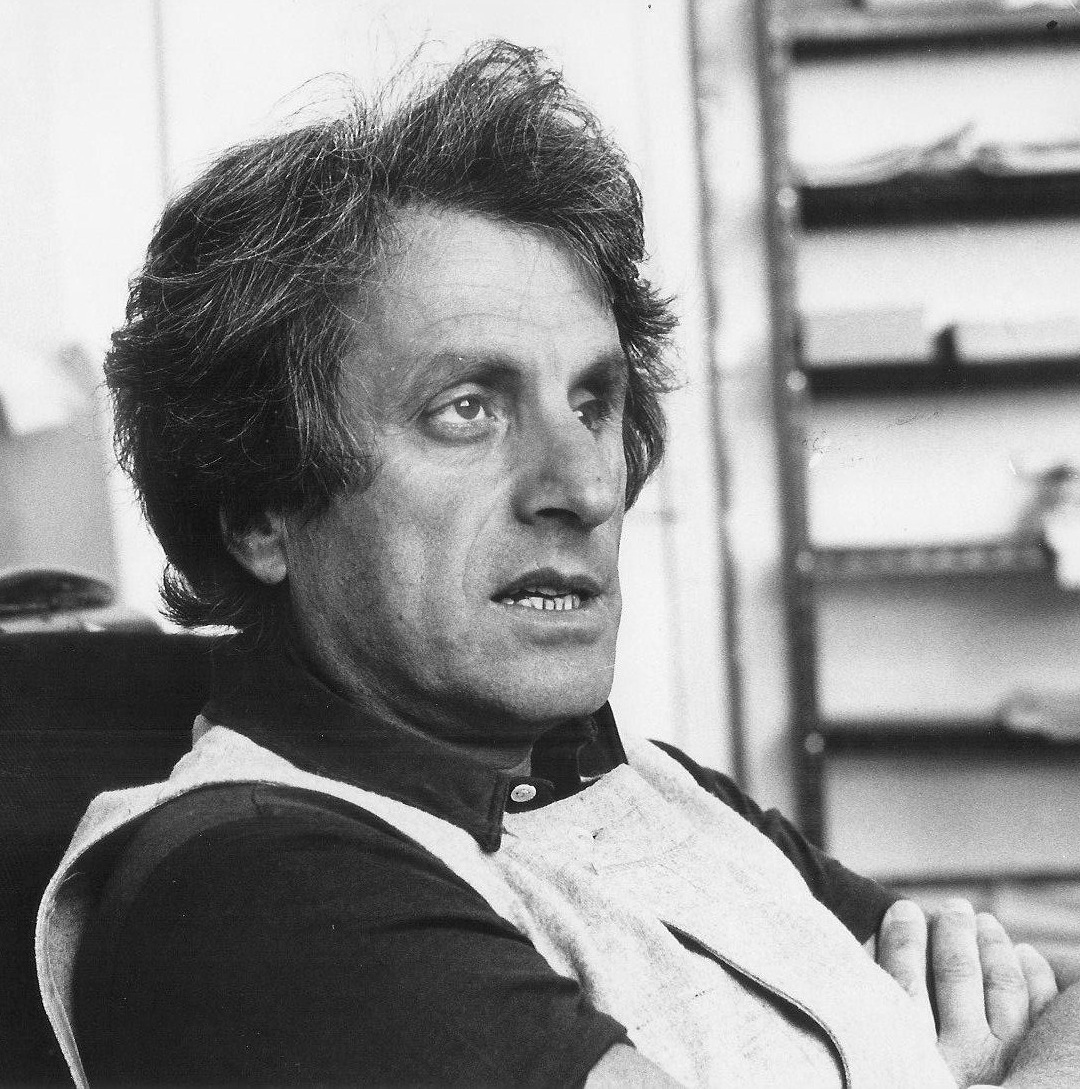
- Iannis Xenakis c. 1970
- Period: Contemporary music
- Genre: Stochastic music
- Composed: 1981
- Dedication: Elisabeth Chojnacka and Silvio Gualda
- Performed: 21 December 1981: Metz
- Duration: 17 minutes
- Scoring: Percussion and harpsichord

Komboï (Greek: Κόμβοι, Knots) is a 1981 stochastic composition for amplified harpsichord and percussion by Greek composer Iannis Xenakis. It is one of the two compositions for harpsichord and percussion written by Xenakis, the other one being Oophaa.

== Composition ==
Xenakis composed Komboï after a long collaboration with both harpsichordist Elisabeth Chojnacka and percussionist Sylvio Gualda, which at that time formed a duo and commissioned works for both instruments to other composers. As Xenakis worked previously with both musicians (he also composed Khoaï for Chojnacka in 1976 and Psappha for Gualda in 1975), the composer was much more focused in exploring the timbral capabilities of both instruments by creating an homogeneous sound texture. It is indeed dedicated to Gualda and Chojnacka, the latter being the dedicatee of all five compositions for harpsichord by Xenakis. It was eventually premiered by the duo on December 22, 1981, at the Rencontres Internationales de Musique Contemporaine in Metz.

== Analysis ==
The composition is in only one movement and takes approximately 17 minutes to perform. It is scored for one harpsichord, one vibraphone, two wood blocks, two bongos, three congas, four tom-toms, one bass drum, and seven terracotta flower pots. As put by Xenakis, Komboï explores "non-octave scales", its rhythm examines "anthypheresis" (displacement of stress), and its timbres exploit "the antitheses or homeophanies of the amplified harpsichord and percussion." In this sense, Komboï means knots, as "knots of rhythms, timbres, structures, and personality," interweaving each one with others. To make instruments blend more effectively, Xenakis used amplification in all of his works for harpsichord.

The composition can be divided in five sections, which also contains interludes and variations. The opening section features an ostinato played by the bongos, while the harpsichord plays mainly rising tone clusters. In this case, the bongos stress beats and offbeats unevenly to produce the sensation of "anthypheresis". Here, Xenakis explores the relationship of the sonority between a somewhat ordered percussion with the clusters played by the harpsichord. The second section, marked Crystalline, mixes the harpsichord and the vibraphone, and the relationship between these two instruments seems to fuse more effectively. After that, the vibraphone changes to the wood blocks and, later on, the harpsichord starts a lengthy solo.

Then, the percussion joins with the sound of the flower pots, which blends with the "needle-like" sound of the harpsichord, which uses an ostinato of seven chords.
