= Denise Restout =

French keyboard teacher (1915–2004)

Denise Theresa Restout (24 November 1915 – 9 March 2004) was a French keyboard teacher, expert on German and French Baroque performance practice for the keyboard. She was assistant, protégé, domestic partner, editor, and biographer for noted harpsichordist Wanda Landowska.

== Biography ==
Born in Paris to Fernand and Juliette (née Frangois) Restout, she earned a Certificate of Primary Studies with honors from the public schools in Paris. She later studied drawing, geometry, history of arts, and painting at the Bazot Studios in Paris, and was admitted to the School of Applied Arts in 1928. Two years later, she received the Frist Medal of the National Conservatory of Music in 1930.

She studied piano, harmony, counterpoint, musicology, voice and organ with expert teachers, and harpsichord, along with keyboard repertoire of the 15th and 18th centuries, with Wanda Landowska, beginning in 1933. Restout worked for a time at the Pleyel Company factory in France. In 1933, she began studying the harpsichord with Landowska and the organ with Joseph Bonnet.

As a performer, Restout appeared at Landowska's public master classes in France, the Netherlands and Strasbourg. Landowska, a naturalized French citizen of Polish-Jewish descent, and Restout escaped Saint-Leu-la-Forêt, France, during the Nazi advance in 1940, and arrived in the United States on 7 December 1941 at Ellis Island, the day Pearl Harbor was attacked.

When Landowska died on 16 August 1959, Restout inherited her estate including her papers and collection of musical instruments. She continued to teach at the Landowska Center, their home in Lakeville, Connecticut until her death. Restout became a naturalized United States citizen in 1961. Three years later, in 1964, she published, with the assistance of Robert Hawkins of The Hotchkiss School, Landowska on Music, a collection of Landowska's writings on music, which included material from Musique ancienne which Restout translated into English from the original French, and many of the master-class notes that Restout had saved during their flight from France.

Restout was a faculty member (at large) of the now-defunct Barlow School in Amenia, Dutchess County, New York, the Peabody Conservatory of Music, the Hartt School, University of Southern Mississippi, and Purchase College. Later in life, Restout was organist at Saint Mary's Roman Catholic church in Lakeville, Connecticut. She was awarded the Amicus Poloniae citation by the government of Poland. Restout died in 2004, aged 88, at St. Francis Medical Center, Hartford, Connecticut.
