= Okho =

1989 composition by Iannis Xenakis

- by Iannis Xenakis
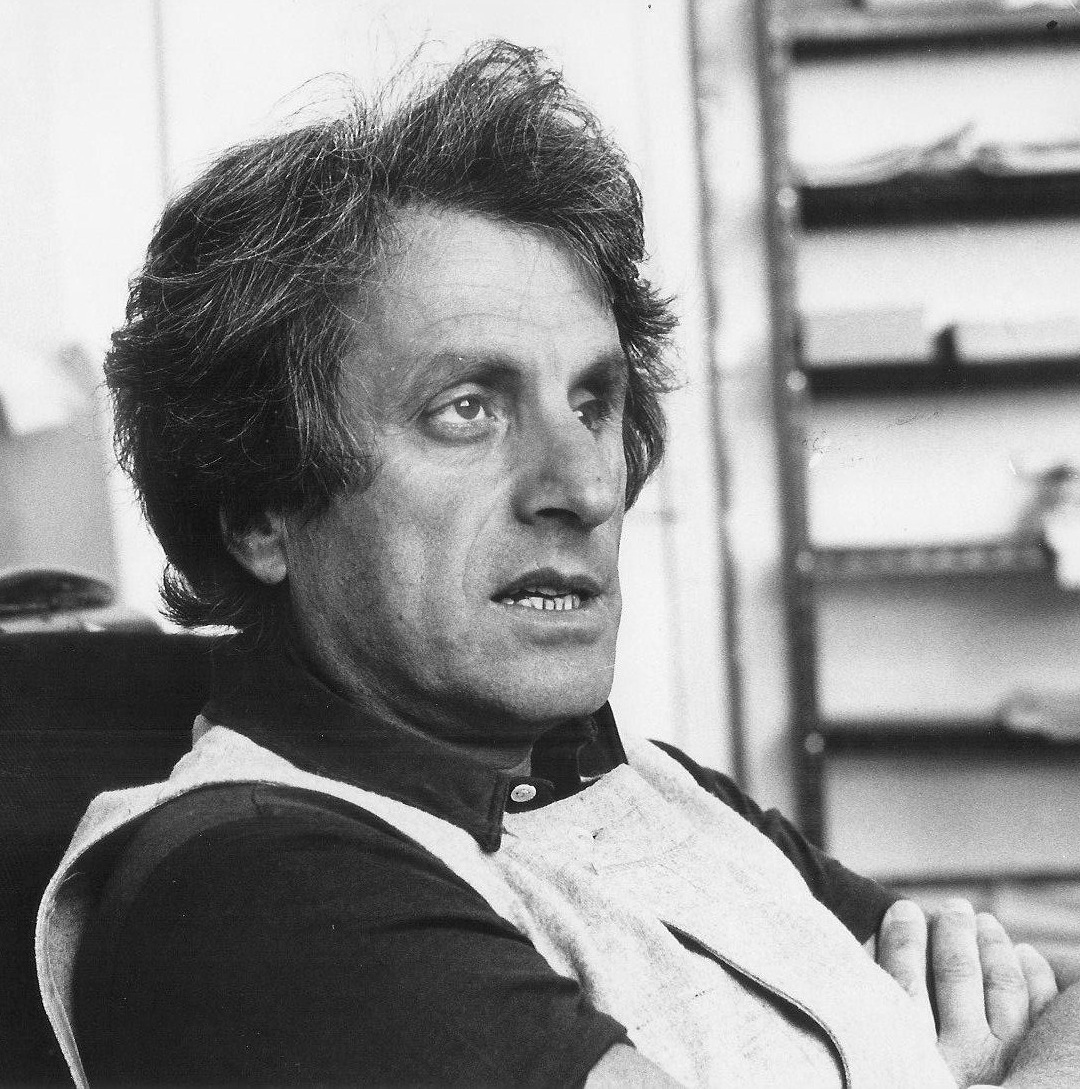
- Iannis Xenakis c. 1970
- Period: Contemporary music
- Occasion: Bicentenary of the French Revolution
- Composed: 1989
- Dedication: Trio Le Cercle -Willy Coquillat -Jean-Pierre Drouet -Gaston Sylvestre
- Performed: 1989
- Published: 1989
- Publisher: Salabert
- Duration: 13 minutes
- Scoring: Three djembes and a large-sized African membranophone

Okho is a composition for three percussionists by Iannis Xenakis completed in 1989.

== Background ==
In the months before the creation of Okho, Xenakis spent some time with other percussionists such as Jean-Pierre Drouet, who first presented the djembe and the zarb in his studio. During this time, Xenakis and other percussionists worked on the different techniques used for playing some African instruments. The title Okho, unlike many other titles from Xenakis's output, is a pure combination of phonemes and has no meaning. The piece was a commission from the Festival d'automne à Paris and the Caisse des Dépôts et Consignations, with the support of the Government of France on the occasion of the celebration of the bicentenary of the French Revolution. Since the score calls for three djembes and an African bass drum, some scholars have highlighted the possible ironic reference to French colonialism, even though no such references were made explicit in the press.

Okho was completed in July 1989. It was dedicated to the percussion trio Le Cercle, formed by Willy Coquillat, Jean-Pierre Drouet, and Gaston Sylvestre, who gave the premiere that year on the ceremony celebrating the bicentenary of the Revolution. It was eventually published that year by Éditions Salabert.

== Structure ==
Okho is scored for three djembes and a large-sized African membranophone that are meant to be played with the hands except where otherwise noted. Because of its difficulty, some percussion ensembles choose to play this piece with sticks and drums with different pitches. It has a total of 138 bars an approximate duration of 13 minutes.

=== Sounds ===
As is customary in other works by Xenakis, Okho presents a series of predefined sounds determined both by the position of the hands on the djembe and the distinct modes of play for each of these positions. Xenakis uses up to six different sounds:

- Bord clair: A rim struck to produce a clear sound, played mezzo-forte.
- Bord claqué sec: A sharp crack on the rim, played forte.
- Bord claqué résonnant: A resonant crack on the rim, played fortissimo.
- Basse étouffée: A muffled bass, played mezzo-forte.
- Basse normale: A normal bass, played forte.
- Basse claquée: A loud crack on the bass, played fortissimo.

These six sounds are meant to be interpreted as different pitches, and Xenakis further specified three different pitches for bord clair in three additional sections: bars 25–32, 52–54, and 56–57. Xenakis also used accents in order to further differentiate some loud sounds and called for certain passages to be played with the nails and the wrists (extended techniques) in order to make glissandi. The bass drum is only played twice throughout the whole piece and is listed in the score as a basse profonde.

=== Sections ===
The piece is cast in one movement and there are no explicit section markings anywhere in the score. However, it has many tempo changes and some scholars agree that, in formal terms, the piece can be divided into five parts. The first part is a canon between the three musicians, marked "♪ = 120 environ". It uses a rhythmic pattern that Xenakis called "Tititi tata" in his sketches. However, from bar 13 onwards, the development process was automated using a program Xenakis developed throughout his career to build his musical language called GENDY (GEN for "generation" and DY for "dynamic") or GENDYN. In bar 25, Xenakis changes the tempo to ♪ = 56 and then alternates both tempos every few bars. Xenakis called these interspersing sections "χάος" (chaos).

The second section begins on bar 59, where the tempo changes to ♪ = 80. Here, Xenakis develops patterns that are based on the Fibonacci series. For example, the first percussionists starts a pattern with 21 thirty-second notes, then repeats the pattern with 13, then 8, and so on, until there are no more numbers left in the series, where he uses a roll ("ondulation" or glissando with the wrist) to turn around the series (first 1, then 2, then 3, then 5...). One of the only two appearances of the African bass drum is made near the end of this section.

The third section begins on the third beat of bar 80, marked ♪ = 66. Here, Xenakis requires the percussionists to use a stick for high-pitched sounds and the hand to low-pitched sounds. He uses a "melodic-percussive rhythm" that was also used in Idmen B.

The fourth section begins on the second beat of bar 104, marked ♪ = 92. The material in this section was developed using the same means as the automated material from the first section.

The final section begins on bar 117. Even though Xenakis initially used ♪ = 70, he later changed his mind and used a slower tempo, ♪ = 56. According to Xenakis, the material used in this section is an exact copy of the music used in one of his other pieces for percussion, Rebonds A, composed that same year. The composer used different rhythms played over quintuplets and had two sections with polyrhythmic lines at tempo ♪ = 60 (bars 124-126 and, again, 130–132). Xenakis also used this method in Peaux. The piece ends at ♪ = 56, with a loud strike of the bass drum.

== Recordings ==
Following is a list of some of the most notable recordings of the piece.

Percussionists	Record company	Year of recording	Format
Pedro Carneiro, Mathew Rich, and Stephen John Gibson	Zig-Zag Territories	2004	CD
red fish blue fish (Terry Longshore, Brett Reed, and David Shively)	Mode Records	2006	CD
