= Tumba (drum) =

The tumba, also known as a tumbadora or salidor, is a kind of long, thin, single-headed drum, whose pitch depends on the part of the head being hit. The tumba is the largest drum of the conga family, typically with a head about 12.5 inches in diameter. There is a super-tumba variant of the tumba that is even larger. Of Cuban origin, the tumba is traditionally a stave drum constructed in the same manner as a barrel with long, thin strips of wood, but can also be made out of fiberglass.

It is also the Panamanian colloquial name for a folkloric drum about 3 feet high, a foot across, mounted on a stand. Either type of tumba are hand drums, meaning they are struck with the hands to produce a tone. Prior to the 1950s Cuban conga players played only one drum made from old rum barrels, but with advances in construction and tuning systems quintos and tumbas were added to the typical setup, respectively above and below the pitch/size of the primary conga.

Tumbas appear in Leroy Anderson's Jazz Pizzicato (1949) and Fiddle-Faddle (1952), Hans Werner Henze's opera The English Cat (1983), Iannis Xenakis' Rebonds (1987-1989), as well as the music of various Latin American dance bands. Also Karlheinz Stockhausen's Kreuzspiel (1951).
