= Rebonds =

1980s composition by Iannis Xenakis

- by Iannis Xenakis
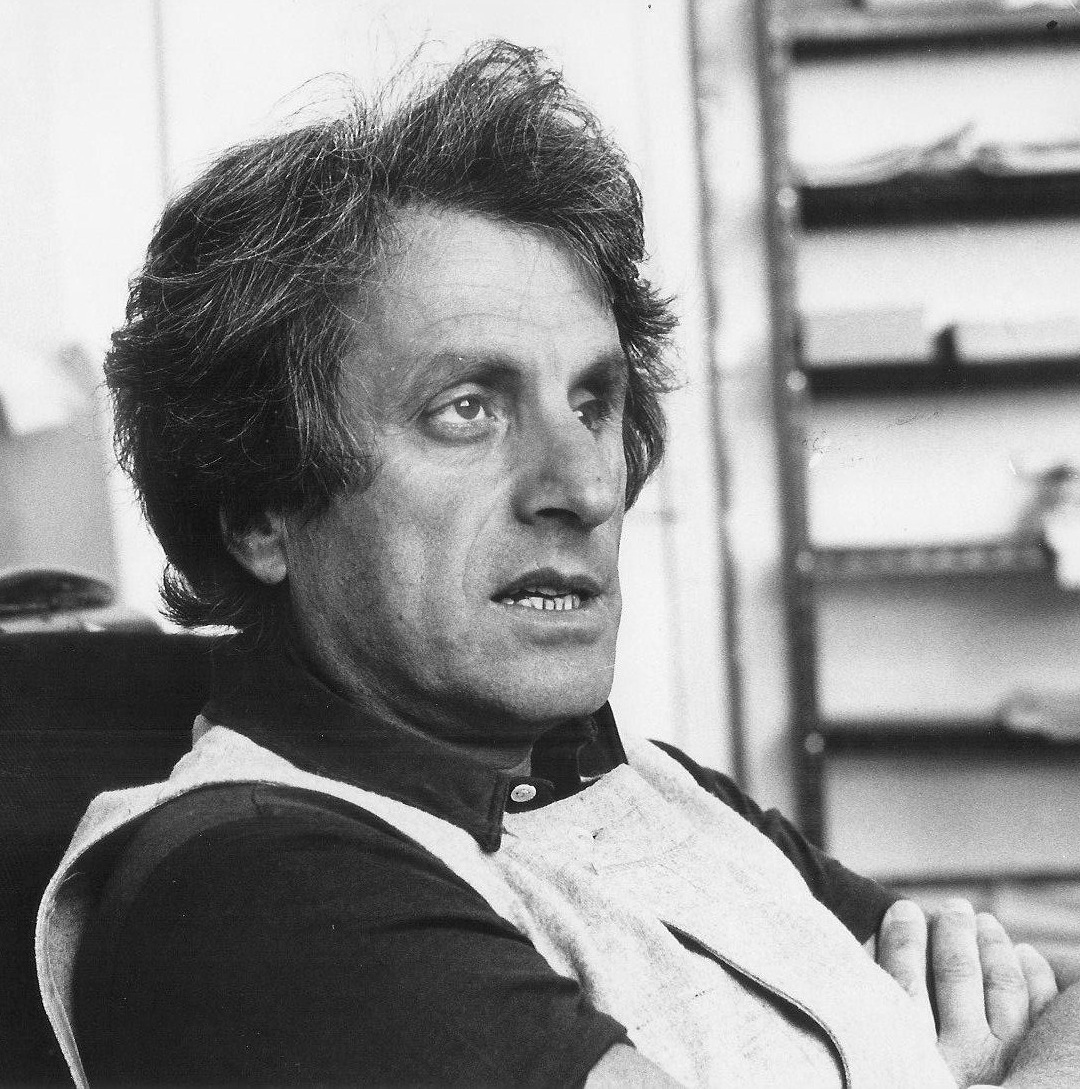
- Iannis Xenakis c. 1970
- Period: Contemporary music
- Composed: 1987–1989
- Dedication: Sylvio Gualda
- Duration: 12 minutes
- Scoring: Percussion

Rebonds is a composition for solo percussion by Greek composer Iannis Xenakis. It was composed between 1987 and 1989 and, together with Psappha, is one of the two compositions for solo percussion by Xenakis.

== Composition ==
Rebonds was written for percussionist Sylvio Gualda, for whom Xenakis had also dedicated other chamber compositions, such as Komboï. It was later published by Éditions Salabert, in an edition revised by Patrick Butin.

Many different elements of this piece, such as the ideas of indeterminacy, and the fact that the piece sounds as if more than one person is playing, creates a new sound for solo percussionists.

== Structure ==
The composition is in two autonomous movements, named A and B. The first movement uses only skins, with two bongos, three tom-toms, and two bass drums. The second movement, however, uses two bongos, one tumba, one tom-tom, one bass drum, and a set of five wood blocks or wooden slats. According to Xenakis, the order of the composition is not fixed: either first A, then B, or vice versa.

== Reception ==
Rebonds has been very well received by critics and musicians. Jacques Longchamp called it an "immense abstract ritual, a suite of movements and of hammerings without any folkloristic "contamination", pure music full of marvellously efflorescent rhythms, going beyond drama and tempest. A new masterpiece".

== Notable recordings ==
The following is a list of notable performances of this composition:

Percussionist	Record Company	Year of Recording	Format
Hans-Kristian Kjos Sørensen	BIS Records	2002	CD
Pedro Carneiro	Zig-Zag Territoires	2005	CD
Steven Schick	Mode Records	2006	CD
Roland Auzet	Mode Records	2008	DVD
