= Orchestra of the Eighteenth Century =

The Orchestra of the Eighteenth Century (Dutch: Orkest van de Achttiende Eeuw; O18c) is a Dutch early music orchestra. Frans Brüggen and Lucy van Dael co-founded the orchestra in 1981. Sieuwert Verster became financial manager in 1984. Although he did not have a formal title with the orchestra, Brüggen served as the de facto principal conductor of the orchestra from its founding until his death in 2014.

As of August 2014, the orchestra consisted of 55 members, from many different countries, who all play on period instruments. The group was formed as a collective, so all orchestra members and the conductor receive equal shares of concert earnings. The orchestra does not audition its members, but receives them through word-of-mouth invitations. Since 2022 the General directorship is in the hands of Kate Rockett. From November 2024 onwards, O18c is no longer a partnership (collective), but works as a foundation.

The orchestra has toured widely both in Europe and America and recorded extensively with Philips Classics, including symphonies of Beethoven, Haydn and Mozart. In more recent years, the orchestra has recorded for the Glossa label.

== Repertoire ==
O18c focussed from the very beginning on the iconic repertoire of the eighteenth century with Haydn, Beethoven and Mozart as its core-repertoire. Famous recordings are with works from Rameau, ofter from then unpublished material, making his music available for the first time. From 2005, the year of the first Chopin and his Europe Festival in Warsaw, the orchestra started playing Chopin in a historically informed manner, and the repertoire has been expanding ever since.
