= Lucy van Dael =

Dutch violinist (born 1946)

Lucy van Dael (born in 1946) is a Dutch baroque violinist and member of the faculty of the Amsterdam Conservatory. Her principal violin studies were at the Royal Conservatory in The Hague.

Originally a classically trained violinist, she began her career with the Netherlands Chamber Orchestra before pursuing baroque violin studies.

She has collaborated extensively with Gustav Leonhardt, Frans Brüggen, and Ton Koopman, co-founded the Orchestra of the 18th Century with Frans Brüggen, and has conducted or performed with many other baroque ensembles, including:

- European Union Baroque Orchestra
- Concerto d'Amsterdam
- Irish Baroque Orchestra
- Beethoven Akademie
- Academia Montis Regalis
- Leonhardt Consort
- La Petite Bande
