= Neupert =

Neupert is a surname. Notable people with the surname include:

- Edmund Neupert (1842–1888), Norwegian pianist and composer
- Robin Neupert (born 1991), German football player
- Uwe Neupert (born 1957), German wrestler

== See also ==
- Neupert effect, an empirical observation on X-ray emissions in solar flares, named after American scientist Werner Neupert
