= Psappha (Xenakis) =

Composition for percussion by Iannis Xenakis

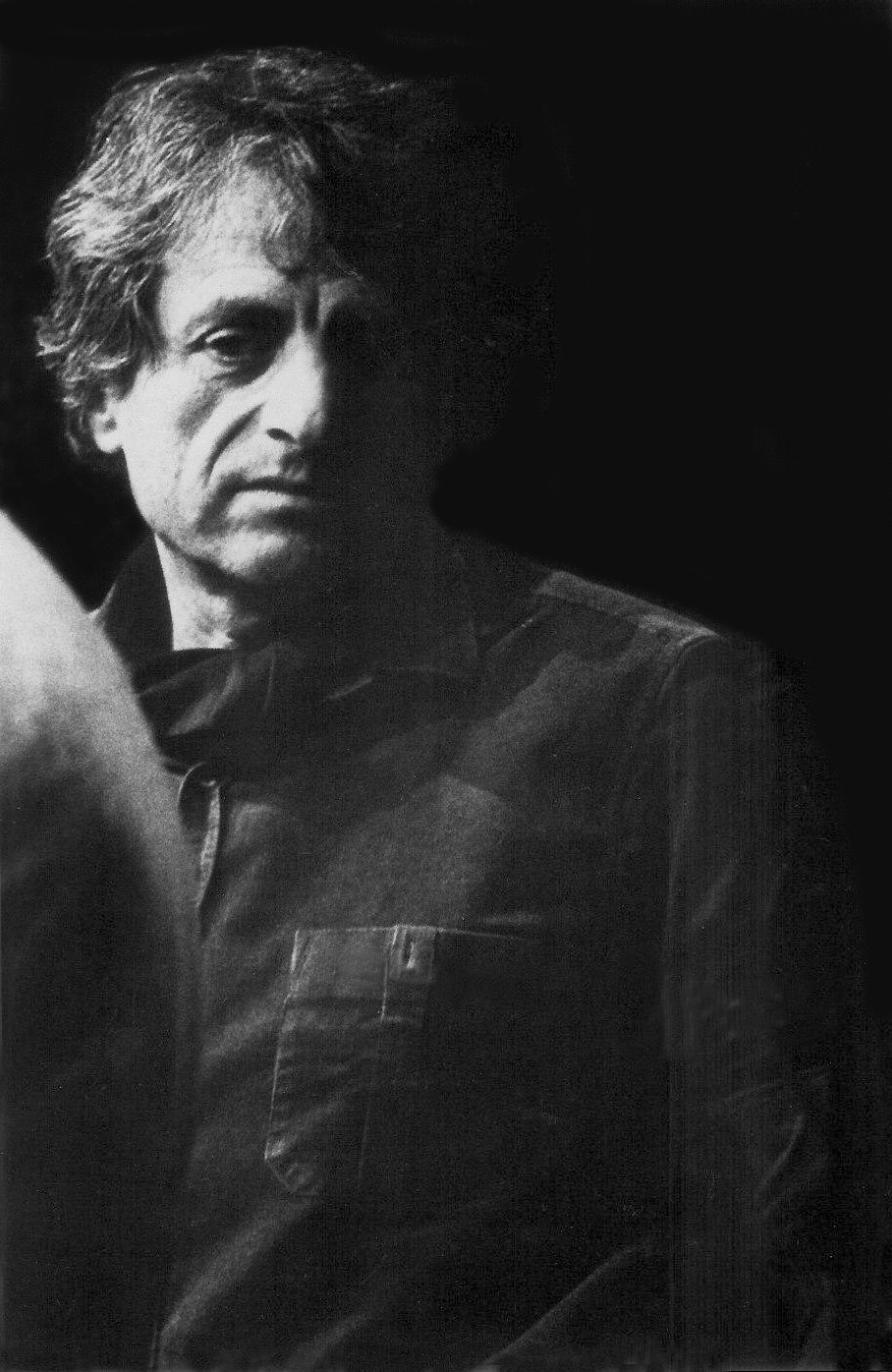
Iannis Xenakis in 1975

Psappha (Edition: Salabert, 1975) is a musical composition for multi-percussion solo by Franco-Greek modernist composer Iannis Xenakis. The work does not include specific instrumentation, although the composer calls for three groups of wood and/or skins and three groups of metal instruments. The actual printed performance score is written in a unique graph notation and consists of 2,396 segments. It presents a greater demand on the performer due to this unique style. Together with Rebonds, composed between 1987 and 1989, Psappha is one of the two compositions for solo percussion by Xenakis.

== Background ==
"Psappha" is an archaic form of "Sappho", a great Greek poet from the Island of Lesbos, born in the 6th century BC. Her style was sensual and melodic, and she was one of the first poets to write from the first person, describing love and loss as it affected her personally. The target of her affections was most commonly female, and today both her name and place of residence have become synonymous with woman-love.

Written for six groups of instruments, three of wood and/or skins and three of metal, Psappha is sharp, brittle, and even violent at times. The inspiration here manifests not as aesthetic, but as structure. The work's rhythmic structures are derived from small rhythmic cells characteristic of Sappho's poetry. These rhythms pervade the entire work and make both local and large-scale appearances. Much of the specifics of instrument choice is left up to the performer: Xenakis writes, "timbre serves only to clarify the rhythmic structures," suggesting the "words" of this poem are only a secondary color to the structures that contain them.

== Commission ==
Psappha was commissioned by the English Bach Festival with financial assistance from the Gulbenkian Foundation and is dedicated to percussionist Sylvio Gualda. The work was premiered by the dedicatee at Round House, London, on 2 May 1976.
