= Harpsichord concerto =

Musical work for solo harpsichord and ensemble

A harpsichord concerto is a piece of music for an orchestra with the harpsichord in a solo role (though for another sense, see below). Sometimes these works are played on the modern piano (see piano concerto). For a period in the late 18th century, Joseph Haydn and Thomas Arne wrote concertos that could be played interchangeably on harpsichord, fortepiano, and (in some cases) pipe organ.

== The Baroque harpsichord concerto ==
The harpsichord was a common instrument in the 1730s, but never as popular as string or wind instruments in the concerto role in the orchestra, probably due to its relative lack of volume in an orchestral setting. In this context, harpsichords were more usually employed as a continuo instrument, playing a harmonised bass part in nearly all orchestral music, the player often also directing the orchestra.

J.S. Bach's Brandenburg Concerto No.5 in D major, BWV 1050, is possibly one of the earliest works in which the harpsichord appears as a concerto soloist, alongside various concertos by Antonio Vivaldi. In this piece, its usual continuo role is alternated with prominent solo obbligato episodes in all three movements. In the first movement the harpsichord, after rapid scales up and down the length of its range, embarks on a solo cadenza which lasts for 3–4 minutes, while the orchestra is silent.

== The concerto for solo harpsichord ==
It was also popular in the Baroque era to adapt Italian concertos for other instruments (such as violin and orchestra) for solo harpsichord (or organ)—which Bach did with many of Vivaldi's concertos. The concerto transcriptions Bach made for harpsichord are listed as BWV 972–987. Bach's Italian concerto BWV 971 is in this transcription style, though it was written as an original piece for harpsichord. A collection of 25 such concertos by Christian Petzold was published in 1729. In 1738 Michael Scheuenstuhl published a similar concerto in G minor.

Bach also composed a concerto for two harpsichords without orchestral accompaniment, BWV 1061a, which is the early version of the concerto for two harpsichords and string orchestra, BWV 1061.

== The new harpsichord concerto ==
With the harpsichord revival in the 20th century, harpsichordists commissioned new pieces for the new 'revival' instrument: Wanda Landowska commissioned concerti from Francis Poulenc and Manuel de Falla. Though the 'revival instruments' have now fallen out of favour, concerti continue to be written for harpsichord, though are now more likely to be played on a copy of a historical instrument, perhaps with a small orchestra or some amplification to ensure it can be well heard.

== List of harpsichord concertos ==
=== Early music ===
- Johann Sebastian Bach (all 1720s-1740s) composed several Harpsichord concertos. For a detailed description and samples of the harpsichord concertos see the dedicated article Keyboard concertos by Johann Sebastian Bach
- Thomas Arne - 6 Favourite Concertos for harpsichord, piano or organ (late 18th century)
- Carl Philipp Emanuel Bach - about 50 keyboard concertos, including one for harpsichord and fortepiano.
- Johann Christian Bach - 6 Concertos for Harpsichord, Op. 1; 5 Concertos for Harpsichord; Concerto for Harpsichord in F minor; 6 Concertos for Keyboard, Op. 7; 6 Concertos for Keyboard, Op. 13
- Wolfgang Amadeus Mozart - Harpsichord concertos Nos 1–4 (KV. 37, 39, 40 and 41) and unnumbered K. 107, arrangements of sonata movements by other composers.
- Georg Matthias Monn - Harpsichord concerto in G minor, Harpsichord concerto in D major (18th century)

=== Modern music ===
- Manuel de Falla - Concerto for harpsichord (1926)
- Francis Poulenc - Concert champêtre (1927–28)
- Walter Leigh - Concertino for Harpsichord and String Orchestra (1934)
- Bohuslav Martinů - Harpsichord Concerto, H. 246 (1935)
- Maria Herz - Concerto for Cembalo (or Pianoforte) with String Orchestra & flute op. 15 (1935)
- Ned Rorem - Concertino da camera for Harpsichord and Seven Instruments (1946)
- Frank Martin - Harpsichord Concerto (1951–52)
- Peter Mieg - Concerto for harpsichord and chamber orchestra (1953)
- Roberto Gerhard - Concerto for harpsichord, percussion and strings (1956)
- Bertold Hummel - Divertimento capriccioso (after themes from the Opera Il Flaminio by G.B. Pergolesi) for harpsichord and chamber orchestra (1958)
- Jean Françaix - Harpsichord Concerto (1959)
- Viktor Kalabis - Concerto for Harpsichord and String Orchestra (1975)
- Franco Donatoni - Portrait for Harpsichord and orchestra (1977)
- Henryk Górecki - Harpsichord Concerto (1980)
- Michael Nyman - Concerto for Harpsichord and Strings (1995)
- Hendrik Bouman - Concerto for Harpsichord and String Orchestra in D major (1998)
- Peter Machajdík - Déjà vu (Concertino for harpsichord and string orchestra) [1999, rev. 2019]
- Philip Glass - Concerto for Harpsichord and Chamber Orchestra (2002)
- Joseph Dillon Ford Concerto for Harpsichord (2006)
- Gianluca Bersanetti - Concerto for Four Harpsichords and Strings in G minor (2009)
- Roberto Di Marino - Harpsichord Concerto (2016, rev. 2024)
- Caroline Shaw - Concerto for Harpsichord & Strings (2022)

Several other works feature the harpsichord as a solo instrument alongside others, including:

- Frank Martin - Petite symphonie concertante for harp, harpsichord, piano and double string orchestra (1945)
- Elliott Carter - Double Concerto (1959–61, for harpsichord and piano with two chamber orchestras)
- Alfred Schnittke - Concerto Grosso No. 1 (1977, for two violins, harpsichord, prepared piano and orchestra)
- John Rutter - Suite Antique (1979, for flute, harpsichord and string orchestra)
- Iannis Xenakis - À l'île de Gorée (1986, for harpsichord and 12 musicians)
