= Elisabeth Chojnacka =

Polish harpsichordist

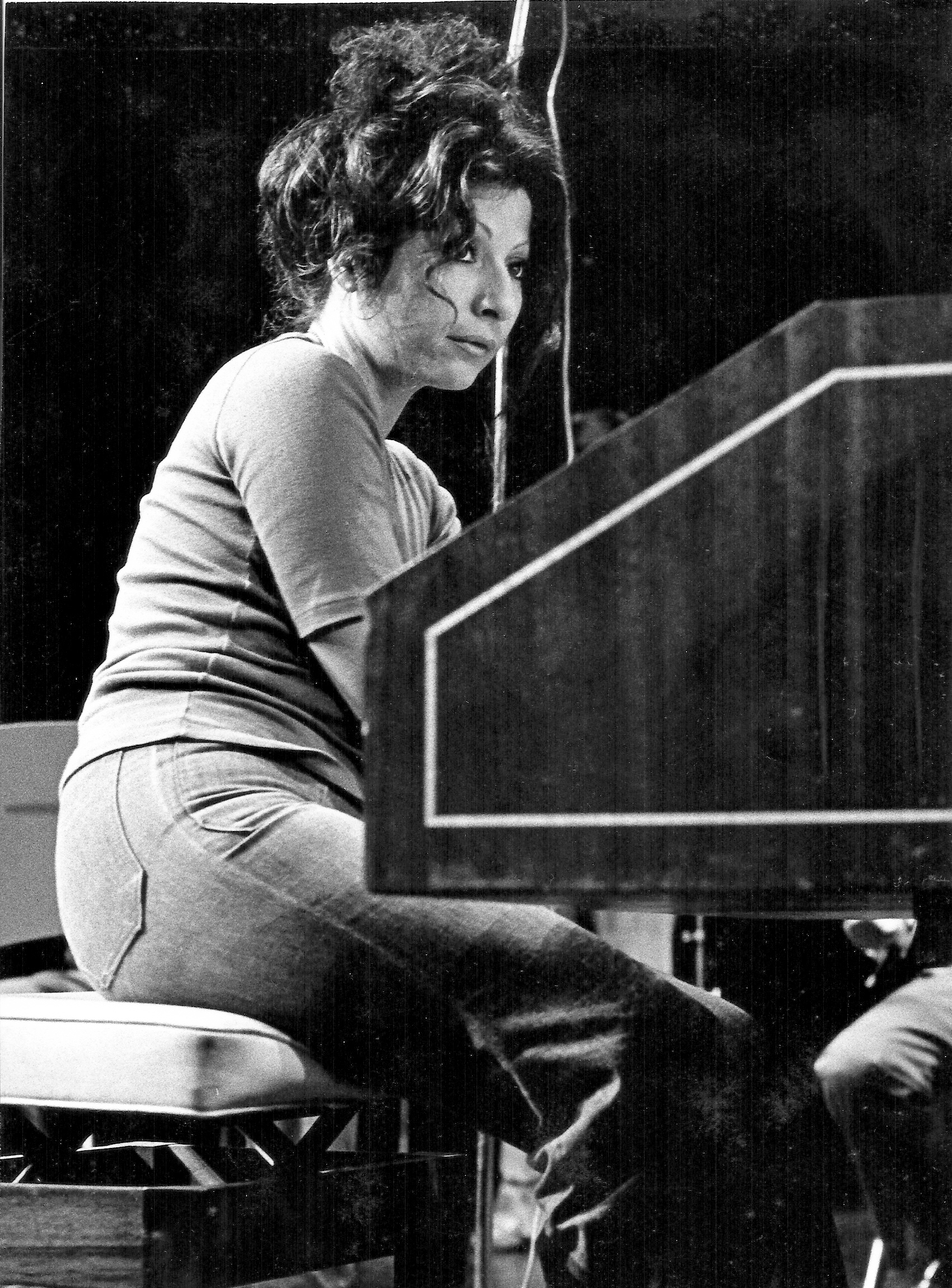

Background information
- Born: Elżbieta Ukraińczyk; 10 September 1939; Warsaw, Poland
- Died: 28 May 2017 (aged 77) Paris, France
- Occupation: Musician
- Instrument: Harpsichord

Elisabeth Chojnacka (born Elżbieta Ukraińczyk; 10 September 1939 – 28 May 2017) was a Polish harpsichordist living in France. She was one of the world's foremost harpsichordists specializing in the performance of contemporary harpsichord music. She often collaborated with and worked closely with composers; Iannis Xenakis dedicated all five of his harpsichord pieces to her, and she gave the premiere for all five.

== Biography ==
Chojnacka earned a degree from the Fryderyk Chopin Music Academy in Warsaw in 1962, after which she moved to Paris, where she studied with Aimée Van de Wiele. She presented the premiere performances of many works for harpsichord, both solo as well as with ensemble and/or electronics. Over 80 composers dedicated works to her. While she was known particularly for her performance of new music, she also played early music in her concerts, as well as in some of her recordings. In performance, she generally performed with her harpsichord slightly amplified.

She formerly taught at the Mozarteum University of Salzburg in Salzburg, Austria, beginning in 1995. She performed and recorded with the Xenakis Ensemble. She won the Grand Prix du Disque for Modern Music in 2003, for her recording of works by Maurice Ohana.

== Death ==
Chojnacka died on 28 May 2017 in Paris at the age of 77.

== Discography ==
- Ohana harpsichord / Ohana - Clavecin
- Energy
- Plus que Tango
- Scott Joplin
- Energy Plus
- Poulenc
- Xénakis
- Ohana
- Rhythm Plus
- Clavecin espagnol du XXème Siècle
- Clavecin 2000
- L'avant-garde du passé
- Le nouveau clavecin
- Clavecin d'aujourd'hui

== Links ==
- Harpsichord 2000 website
- Elisabeth Chojnacka profile, nieuwe-muziek.nl

== Sources ==
- Harley, James Xenakis: his life in music p. 103, Routledge, New York (2004) ISBN 0-415-97145-4
