= Wanda Landowska =

Polish harpsichordist and pianist (1879–1959)

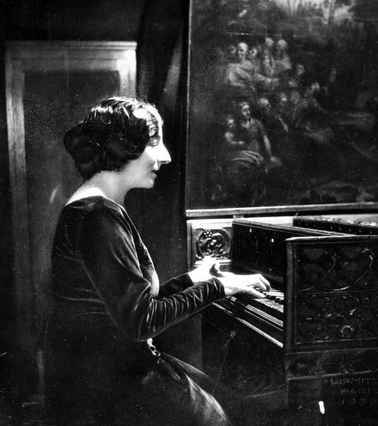
- Landowska in 1937
- Born: 5 July 1879; Warsaw, Poland
- Died: 16 August 1959 (aged 80); Lakeville, Connecticut, United States
- Occupations: Pianist; Harpsichordist; Academic teacher; Composer

Wanda Aleksandra Landowska (5 July 1879 – 16 August 1959) was a Polish harpsichordist, pianist, and composer whose performances, teaching, writings and especially her many recordings played a large role in reviving the popularity of the harpsichord in the early 20th century. She was the first person to record Johann Sebastian Bach's Goldberg Variations on the harpsichord in 1933. She became a naturalized French citizen in 1938.

== Life and career ==
=== Life in Europe ===
External audio
- You may hear Wanda Landowska introducing and performing Johann Sebastian Bach's Inventions and Sinfonias, BWV 722-801 in 1959 on archive.org

Landowska was born in Warsaw to Polish-Jewish parents. Her father was a lawyer, and her mother was a linguist who translated Mark Twain into Polish. She began playing piano at the age of four, and studied at the Warsaw Conservatory with the senior Jan Kleczyński and Aleksander Michałowski. She was considered a child prodigy.

She studied composition and counterpoint under Heinrich Urban in Berlin, and had lessons in Paris with Moritz Moszkowski. She began her performing career in Paris, where her recitals in that city and other European cities garnered praise from critics. She was interested in the music of J. S. Bach, whose works for harpsichord were included in her recitals by 1903, earning praise from Albert Schweitzer.

She decided to devote her career to the revival harpsichord rather than the piano, against the wishes of her friends, who thought she had a promising future as a pianist. After eloping with and marrying Polish folklorist and ethnomusicologist Henry Lew in 1900 in Paris, she taught piano at the Schola Cantorum there (1900–1912). In 1908–09, she toured Russia with a Pleyel et Cie harpsichord, similar to the 1889 model that the firm displayed at the Paris Exposition.

She later taught harpsichord at the Berlin Hochschule für Musik (1912–1919). When World War I started in 1914, she was interned on the grounds that she was a foreign national. In April 1919, a few months after WWI ended, her husband died in a car accident. She had her American debut in 1923, touring major cities with four Pleyel Grand Modele de Concert harpsichords, which were huge seven-and-a-half foot long instruments with foot pedal-controlled registers. These were large, heavily built harpsichords with a 16-foot stop (a set of strings an octave below normal pitch) and owed much to piano construction.

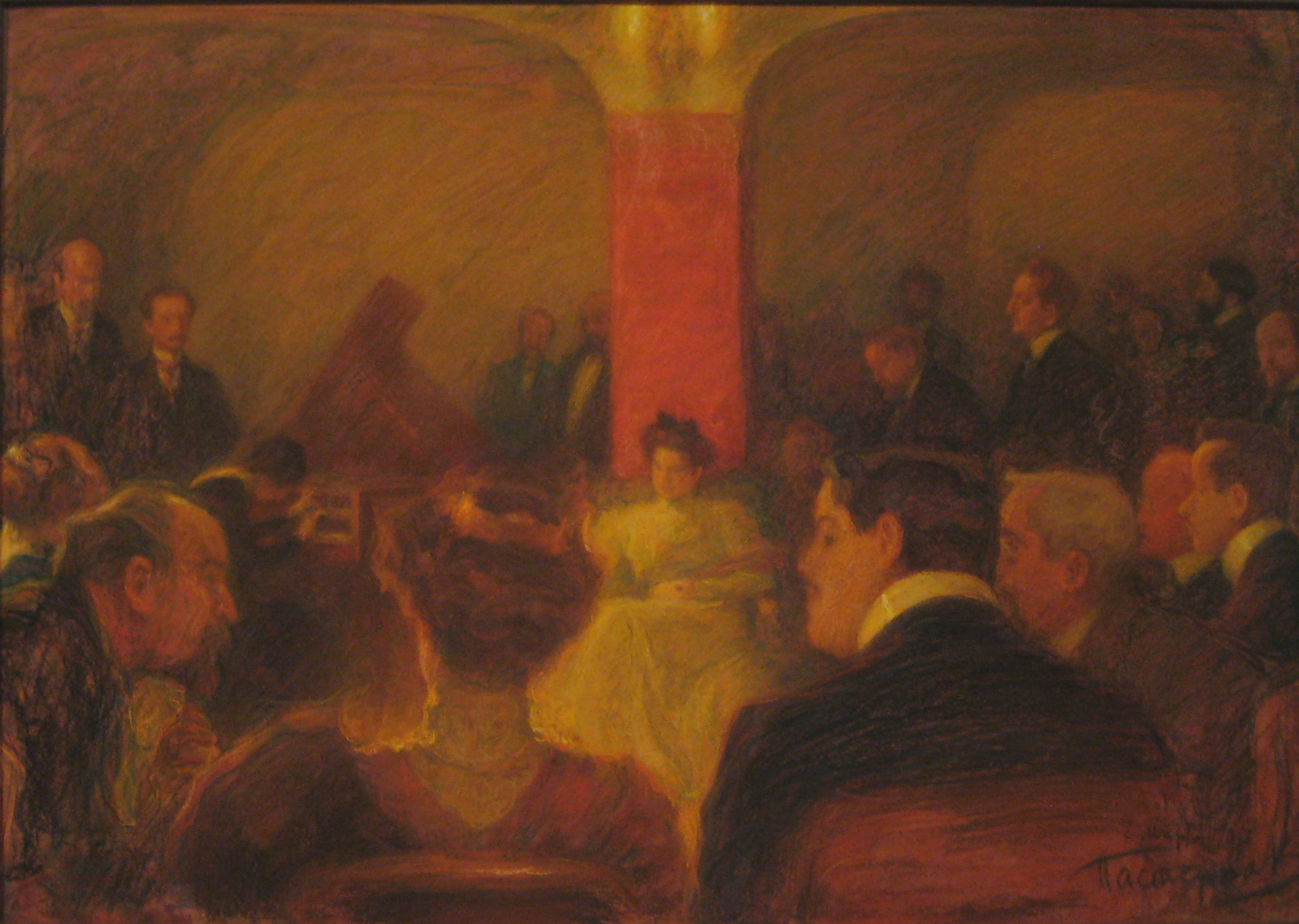
Leonid Pasternak. Concert of Wanda Landowska in Moscow (1907), a pastel from the Tretyakov Gallery.

Deeply interested in musicology, and particularly in the works of Bach, Couperin and Rameau, she toured the museums of Europe looking at original keyboard instruments; she acquired old instruments and had new ones made by Pleyel and Company at her request. Responding to criticism by fellow Bach specialist Pablo Casals, she once said: "You play Bach your way, and I'll play him 'his' way."

A number of important new works were written for her: Manuel de Falla's El retablo de maese Pedro (Master Peter's Puppet Show) marked the return of the harpsichord to the modern orchestra. Falla later wrote a harpsichord concerto for her, and Francis Poulenc composed his Concert champêtre for her.

She taught at the Curtis Institute of Music in Philadelphia from 1925 until 1928. In 1925, she established the École de Musique Ancienne based in Paris: from 1927, her home in Saint-Leu-la-Forêt became a center for the performance and study of old music. During this time Landowska frequented the salon of Natalie Clifford Barney, to both socialize and perform.

=== Life in America ===
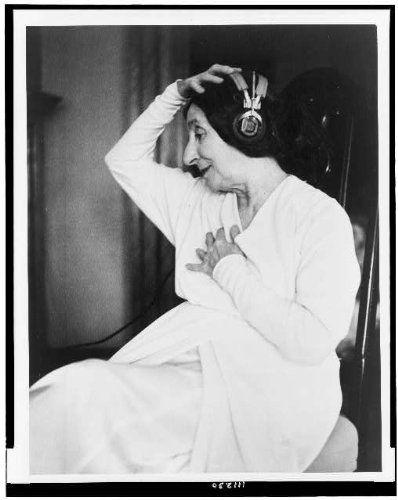
Landowska in 1953

When the German Army invaded France, Landowska fled with her student and domestic partner Denise Restout. After leaving Saint-Leu in 1940, sojourning in Banyuls-sur-Mer, a commune in southern France, where her friend, sculptor Aristide Maillol was living, they sailed from Lisbon to the United States. Believing the Nazi threat to be temporary she had left with only two suitcases. She arrived in New York on 7 December 1941, the date of the attack on Pearl Harbor. Her home in Saint-Leu was looted, and her instruments and manuscripts were stolen, so she arrived in the United States essentially with no assets.

Her 1942 performance of Bach's Goldberg Variations at New York's Town Hall was the first occasion in the 20th century when the piece was played on the harpsichord, the instrument for which it had been written.

She settled in Lakeville, Connecticut, in Litchfield County, in 1949, and re-established herself as a performer and teacher in the United States, touring extensively. Her last public performance was in 1954. Her partner, Denise Restout, was editor and translator of her writings on music, including Musique ancienne, and Landowska on Music, published posthumously in 1964.

Among her students were Sylvia Marlowe and Rafael Puyana.

She died in Lakeville on 16 August 1959.

== Recordings ==
Landowska recorded extensively for the Victor Talking Machine Company/RCA Victor and the Gramophone Company/EMI/His Master's Voice.

External audio
- You may hear Wanda Landowska performing Handel's Harmonious Blacksmith in 1948 on archive.org
- You may hear Wanda Landowska performing Johann Sebastian Bach's Goldberg Variations, BWV 988 in 1945 on archive.org
- You may hear Wanda Landowska performing Mozart's Turkish March Rondo, K. 485 in 1948 on archive.org

- Bach, Goldberg Variations (His Master's Voice), French Suite No. 6 (His Master's Voice), Italian Concerto (His Master's Voice), Concerto No. 1. in D major (His Master's Voice/ RCA Victor), Concerto in D minor, Das Wohltemperierte Klavier I (His Master's Voice), Das Wohltemperierte Klavier II (RCA Victor), Fantasia in C minor, Chromatic Fantasia and Fugue, Partita in B flat major, Toccata in D major, Sonata in E major with Yehudi Menuhin, Prelude, Fugue and Allegro in E flat major, 15 "Inventions for two voices", Passepied E minor, Gavotte in G minor, Fantasia in C minor, English suite in A minor, French Suite in E major
- Diomedes Cato, Chorea Polonica
- Chambonnières, Sarabande in D minor
- Chopin, Mazurka Op 56 No. 2 in C major
- Couperin, Air dans le Gout Polonais (RCA Victor), L'Arlequine (His Master's Voice), Les Barricades mystérieuses (RCA Victor), Le Rossignol en Amour, Album: La Favorite
- Handel, Harmonious Blacksmith, Concerto in B flat major, Five suites: Nos 2, 5, 7, 10, 14
- Jacob Le Polonais, Gagliarda-Polish dance
- Wanda Landowska, The Houblon (Polish folk song), Bourrée d'Auvergne
- Mozart, Coronation Concerto K 537 for piano and orchestra, Turkish march, Rondo in K 485, Minuet in K 355, Sonata in K 332, K 576, K 333(piano), K 311, K 282, K 283, Rondo in K 511, Waltzes in K 605 (transcribed by Landowska for the piano), Fantasia in D minor, K 397 (piano), Minuet from Don Giovanni
- Oginski, Polonaises (A minor, G major)
- Purcell, Ground in C minor
- Rameau, La Dauphine, Air grave pour deux Polonais, Suite in E minor, Le Tambourin, La Poule, La Joyeuse, Les Tricotets, Les Sauvages, Two minuets
- Scarlatti, 1st Album of 20 Sonatas, 2nd Album of 20 Sonatas, Sonatas in D major, L 418, Sonatas in D minor, L 423
- Anon. – English, The Nightingale
- Anon. – Polish, Two dances
- Lully, Les Songes d'Atys
- Pachelbel, Two Magnificats

== Compositions ==
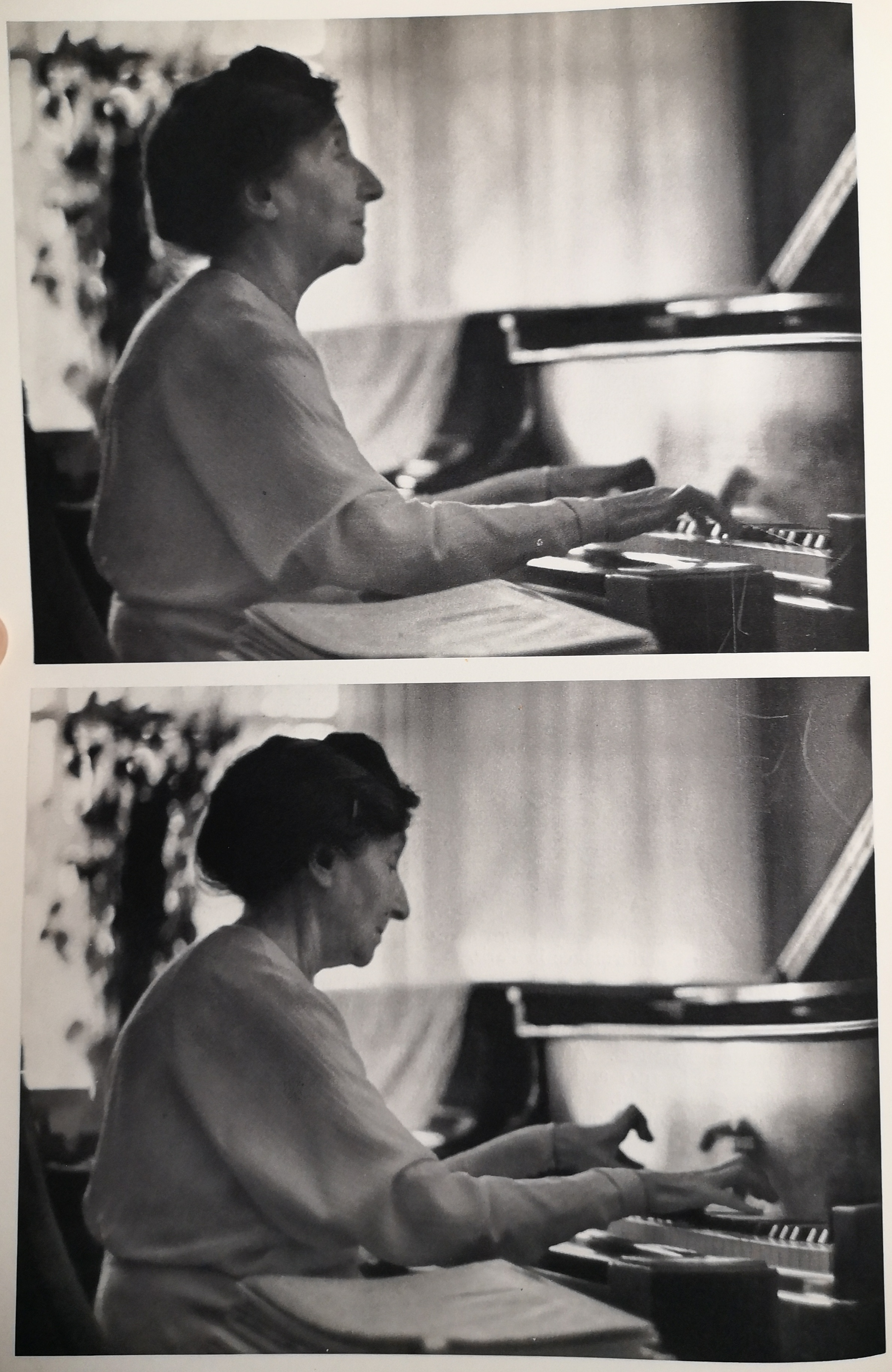
Landowska playing the piano

- A serenade for strings and several works for string orchestra
- Chorus for women's voices and orchestra
- "Hebrew Poem" for orchestra
- Polish popular songs-for solo voice, woodwind and chorus
- Polish popular songs-a cappella for Orfeó Català, Barcelona
- Polish popular songs-for harpsichord and string ensemble
- More than a hundred songs for voice and piano and several piano pieces
- Fanfare for the Liberation-military band
- Cadenzas for Mozart concertos and for Haydn's Concerto in D major
- Transcriptions for the piano: Mozart-Country Dances, Lanner-Viennese Waltzes, Schubert-Chaîne de Ländler

== Literary works ==
- La Musique ancienne, 1909, by Wanda Landowska and Henry Lew (translated New York, 1923)
- A Camera Three series program, a dramatization of some writings of Landowska as read by actress Agnes Moorehead, entitled Reminiscences of Wanda Landowska aired 17 March 1963 on CBS.

== Reviews and opinions ==
- "Almost needless to say, the playing is full of vigorous gestures and individual ideas. She was no respecter of text and there are little repeats here and there which are no more indicated than they are necessary. Yet such matters seem something of an irrelevance, since they only reflect an attitude of the time adopted by a celebrated pioneer of the harpsichord revival in the twentieth century. No, what charms me in Landowska's recital is her affecting poetic insight into Scarlatti's music; she is not just rediscovering the proper conjunction of composer and instrument, she believes in it and feels it intensely."
- Sol Babitz stated that "She always played the music 'as written' with the result that a series of fast notes did not sound like 'bundles of them' (North 1700) but like a sewing machine. Thanks to her wide influence this blight can be heard in her pupils to this day."
- Virgil Thomson wrote in November 1944: "Wanda Landowska's harpsichord recital of last evening at the Town Hall was as stimulating as a needle shower. Indeed, the sound of that princely instrument, when it is played with art and fury, makes one think of golden rain and of how Danaë's flesh must have tingled when she found herself caught out in just such a downpour….She played everything better than anybody else ever does. That is to say that the way she makes music is so deeply satisfactory that one has the feeling of a fruition, of a completeness at once intellectual and sensuously auditory beyond which it is difficult to imagine anything further."

== See also ==
Johann Sebastian Bach
Francois Couperin
Jean-Philippe Rameau
Harpsichord
Pleyel et Cie
