= List of compositions by Manuel de Falla =

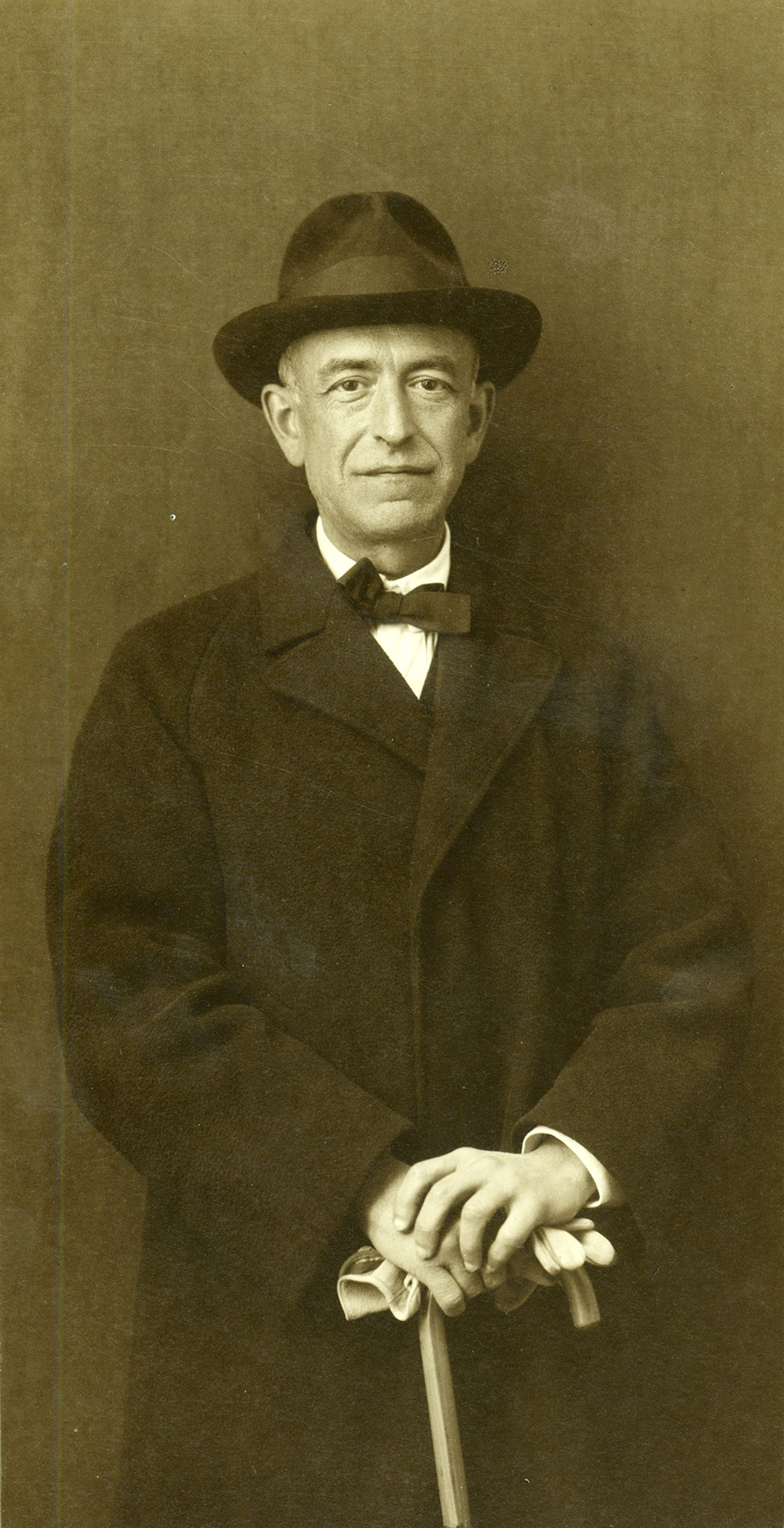
Manuel de Falla

This is a list of compositions by Manuel de Falla (1876–1946).

== Stage works ==
This is a complete list of Manuel de Falla's stage works.

| Title | Genre | Subdivisions | Libretto | Composition | Première date | Place, theatre |
|---|---|---|---|---|---|---|
| El conde de Villamediana | | | composer | 1887, but lost | | |
| La Juana y la Petra (La casa de tócame Roque) | zarzuela | 1 act | J. Santero, after Ramon de la Cruz | 1900, but lost | unperformed | |
| Limosna de amor | zarzuela | 1 act | José Jackson Veyán | 1901–1902 | unperformed | |
| Los amores de la Inés | zarzuela | 1 act | Emilio Dugi (Mannel Osorio y Bertrand) | | 12 April 1902 | Madrid, Teatro Cómico |
| El cornetín de órdenes (composed with Amadeo Vives) | zarzuela | 3 acts | | c. 1903, but lost | | |
| La cruz de Malta (composed with Amadeo Vives) | zarzuela | | | c. 1903, but lost | | |
| Prisionero de guerra (composed with Amadeo Vives) | zarzuela | | | c. 1903–1904 | | |
| La vida breve | lyric drama | 2 acts | Carlos Fernández Shaw | 1904–1905 | 1 April 1913 | Nice, Municipal Casino |
| El amor brujo | 1. gitaneria / 2. symphonic work / 3. ballet pantomímico | | Gregorio Martínez Sierra | 1914–1925 | 1. 15 April 1915, 2. 28 March 1916 | Madrid, Teatro Lara |
| The Three-Cornered Hat | ballet | 1 act | Gregorio Martínez Sierra, after Pedro Antonio de Alarcón's El sombrero de tres picos | | 22 July 1919 | London, Alhambra Theatre |
| Fuego fatuo | opera | 3 acts | after themes by Frédéric Chopin, libretto by M. Martínez Sierra | 1918–1919, but unfinished | unperformed | |
| El retablo de maese Pedro | puppet opera | 1 act | composer, after Cervantes | 1919–1923 | 25 June 1923 | Paris, Palace of the Princess of Polignac |
| El gran teatro del mundo | incidental music | | composed for a performance of Calderón de la Barca's play of the same name | 1927 | 27 June 1927 | Granada, Plaza de los Aljibes de la Alhambra |
| Atlántida (revised and completed by Ernesto Halffter) | cantata escénica (for soloist, chorus and orchestra) | prologue and three parts | composer, after Jacint Verdaguer | 1927–1946 | 24 November 1961 (concert version); 18 June 1962 (stage version) | Barcelona, Gran Teatre del Liceu; Milan, Teatro alla Scala |

== Orchestral works ==
- Noches en los jardines de España ("Nights in the Gardens of Spain") – piano and orchestra (c. 1909–1916)
- Homenajes ("Homages") – orchestra (1938–1939)
  Sections: I. "Fanfare sobre el nombre de E. F. Arbós" – II. "À Claude Debussy (Elegía de la guitarra)" – Rappel de la Fanfare – III. "À Paul Dukas (Spes Vitae)" – IV. "Pedrelliana"

== Chamber ensembles and solo instrument works ==
- Melodía para violonchelo y piano – for piano and cello (1897)
- Pieza en Do mayor and Romanza – for cello and piano (1898)
- Fanfare pour une fête ("Fanfare for a feast") – for two trumpets, timpani and side-drum (1921)
- Concerto for harpsichord, flute, oboe, clarinet, violin and cello – dedicated to Wanda Landowska (c. 1923–1926)
- Fanfare sobre el nombre de Arbós ("Fanfare on the name of Arbós") – for trumpets, horns and drums (1934); orchestrated as a section of Homenajes.

== Instrumental works ==
=== Piano ===
- Nocturne (1896)
- Mazurka in C minor (1899)
- Serenata andaluza ("Andalusian Serenade") (1900)
- Canción ("Song") (1900)
- Vals capricho (1900)
- Cortejo de gnomos ("Procession of Gnomes") (1901)
- Allegro de concierto (1903–1904)
- Cuatro piezas españolas, Pièces espagnoles ("Four Spanish Pieces") – for piano, dedicated to Isaac Albéniz (c. 1906–1909)
- Fantasía Bética – for piano, dedicated to Arthur Rubinstein (1919)
- Canto de los remeros del Volga (del cancionero musical ruso) ("Song of the Volga boatmen") (1922)
- Pour le tombeau de Paul Dukas (1935) – piano (1935); orchestrated as the third part of Homenajes

=== Guitar ===
- Pour le tombeau de Claude Debussy – for guitar; arranged for piano (1920); orchestrated as the second section of Homenajes

== Choral works ==
- Balada de Mallorca ("Ballad of Majorca") – for choir (1933)

== Vocal works ==
- Preludios ("Preludes") – voice and piano, text ("Madre todas las noches") by Antonio de Trueba (c. 1900)
- Rima ("Rime") – voice and piano, text ("Olas gigantes") by Gustavo Adolfo Bécquer (c. 1900)
- Dios mío, qué solos se quedan los muertos – voice and piano, text by Gustavo Adolfo Bécquer (c. 1900)
- Tus ojillos negros ("Your small black eyes") – voice and piano, text by Cristóbal de Castro (1902–1903)
- Cantares de Nochebuena "Songs of Christmas Eve" – nine popular songs for voice, guitar and (at least in the case of the first two songs) zambomba and rebec or chicharra (1903–1904)
- Trois mélodies – voice and piano, words by Théophile Gautier (1909–1910)
- Siete canciones populares españolas ("Seven Spanish Folksongs") – for voice and piano, dedicated to Madame Ida Godebska (1914)
- Oración de las madres que tienen sus hijos en sus brazos ("Prayer of the mothers embracing their children" – voice and piano, words by Gregorio Martínez Sierra (1914)
- El pan de Ronda que sabe a verdad ("The bread of Ronda has a taste of truth") – voice and piano, by G. Martínez Sierra (1915)
- Psyché – for mezzo-soprano, flute, harp, violin, viola and cello (1924)
- Soneto a Córdoba ("Sonnet to Cordoba") – for soprano voice and harp (or piano), text by Luis de Góngora (1927)

== Arrangements of other authors' works ==
- Cançó de nadal (1922)
- Claude Debussy – Prélude à l'après-midi d'un faune (1924)
- Preludio (1924)
- Gioachino Rossini – Overture to The Barber of Seville (1924–1925)
- Ave María (1932)
- L´amfiparnaso (Palma de Mallorca, 1934)
- Invocatio ad individuam trinitatem (Granada, 1935)
- Himno marcial (Granada, 1937)
- Emendemus in melius (Granada, 1939)
- Madrigal: prado verde y florido (Granada, 1939)
- Romance de Granada: qué es de ti, desconsolado (Granada, 1939)
- Tan buen ganadico (Granada, 1939)
- ¡Ora, sus! (Granada, 1939)
- O magnum mysterium (in circuncisione Domini) (Villa del Lago, 1940–1942)
- Tenebrae factae sunt (responsorium) (Villa del Lago, 1940–1942)
- Miserere mei Deus (salmo 50) (Villa del Lago, 1940–1942)
- In festo Sancti Jacobi (o Lux et decus Hispaniae) (Villa del Lago, 1940–1942)
- Benedictus (de la misa "Vidi speciosam") (Villa del Lago, 1940–1942)
- Gloria (de la misa "Vidi speciosam") (Villa del Lago, 1940–1942)
- Cançó de l´estrella (Villa del Lago, 1941–1942)
- Romance de Don Joan y Don Ramón (Villa del Lago, 1941–1942)
