= Ritual Fire Dance =

Piece of music by Manuel de Falla

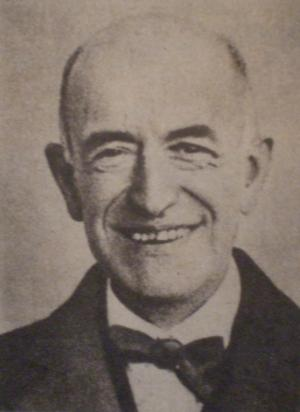
Manuel de Falla, composer of Ritual Fire Dance

Ritual Fire Dance (Spanish: Danza ritual del fuego) is a movement of the ballet El amor brujo (The Bewitched Love), written by the Spanish composer Manuel de Falla in 1915. It was made popular by the composer's own piano arrangement. The dance has a duration of about three to four and a half minutes.

The work can be associated to Rimsky-Korsakov's "Flight of the Bumblebee" due to its fast, repetitive trills and ornaments. The piece was also influenced by the traditional, religious ceremony of a fire dance, a dance which was used to worship the fire-god and in which people would often jump through or leap around the fire.

== Plot ==
In de Falla's ballet El amor brujo, a young Andalusian gypsy girl called Candela is haunted by the ghost of her dead husband. To get rid of him, all the gypsies make a large circle around their campfire at midnight. Candela then performs the Ritual Fire Dance. This causes the ghost to appear, with whom she then dances. As they whirl around faster and faster, the ghost is drawn into the fire, making it vanish forever.

== Instrumentation and transcriptions ==
The "Ritual Fire Dance", and the ballet as a whole, has been transcribed many times since its original composition in 1915, often by Manuel de Falla himself.

Form of transcription	Instrumentation	Date of transcription
Original composition	Singing voice (the role of Candélas), flute (piccolo), oboe, horn, cornet, bells, piano, 2 first violins, 2 second violins, 2 violas, 2 cellos and double bass	1915
Sextet	2 violins, viola, cello, double bass and piano	1915
Full orchestral	2 flutes (piccolo), oboe, 2 clarinets, bassoon, 2 horns, 2 trumpets, timpani (bells), piano and strings	1916
Small orchestral	Chamber orchestra	1917
Ballet	Voice (mezzo-soprano), 2 flutes (piccolo), oboe (cor anglais), 2 clarinets, bassoon, 2 horns, 2 trumpets, timpani, percussion, piano and strings	1919
Piano rendition	Solo piano	1921
Concert ballet	2 flutes (piccolo), oboe (cor anglais), 2 clarinets, bassoon, 2 horns, 2 trumpets, timpani, percussion, piano and strings.	1925
Brass band	British brass band	2008

== Structure and analysis of the piano version ==
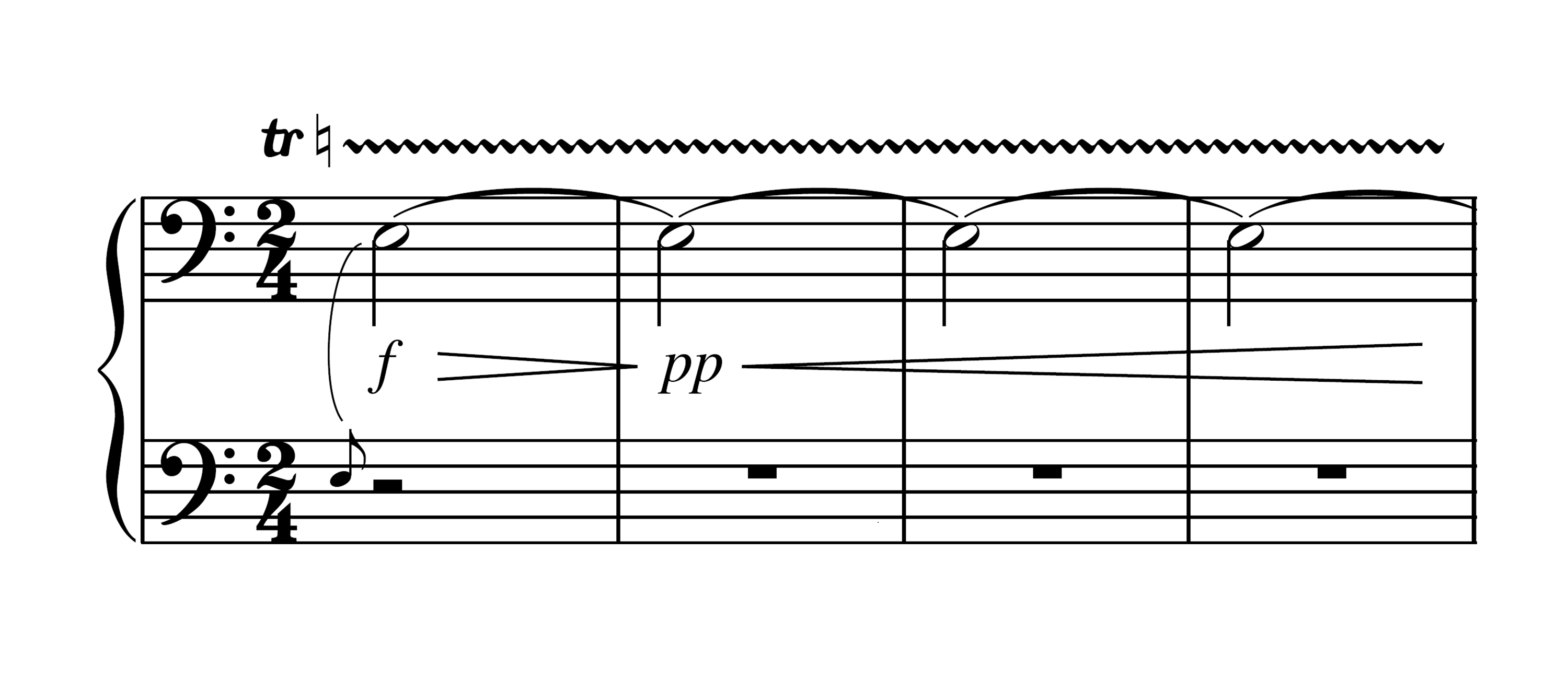
Elaborate trills at the start

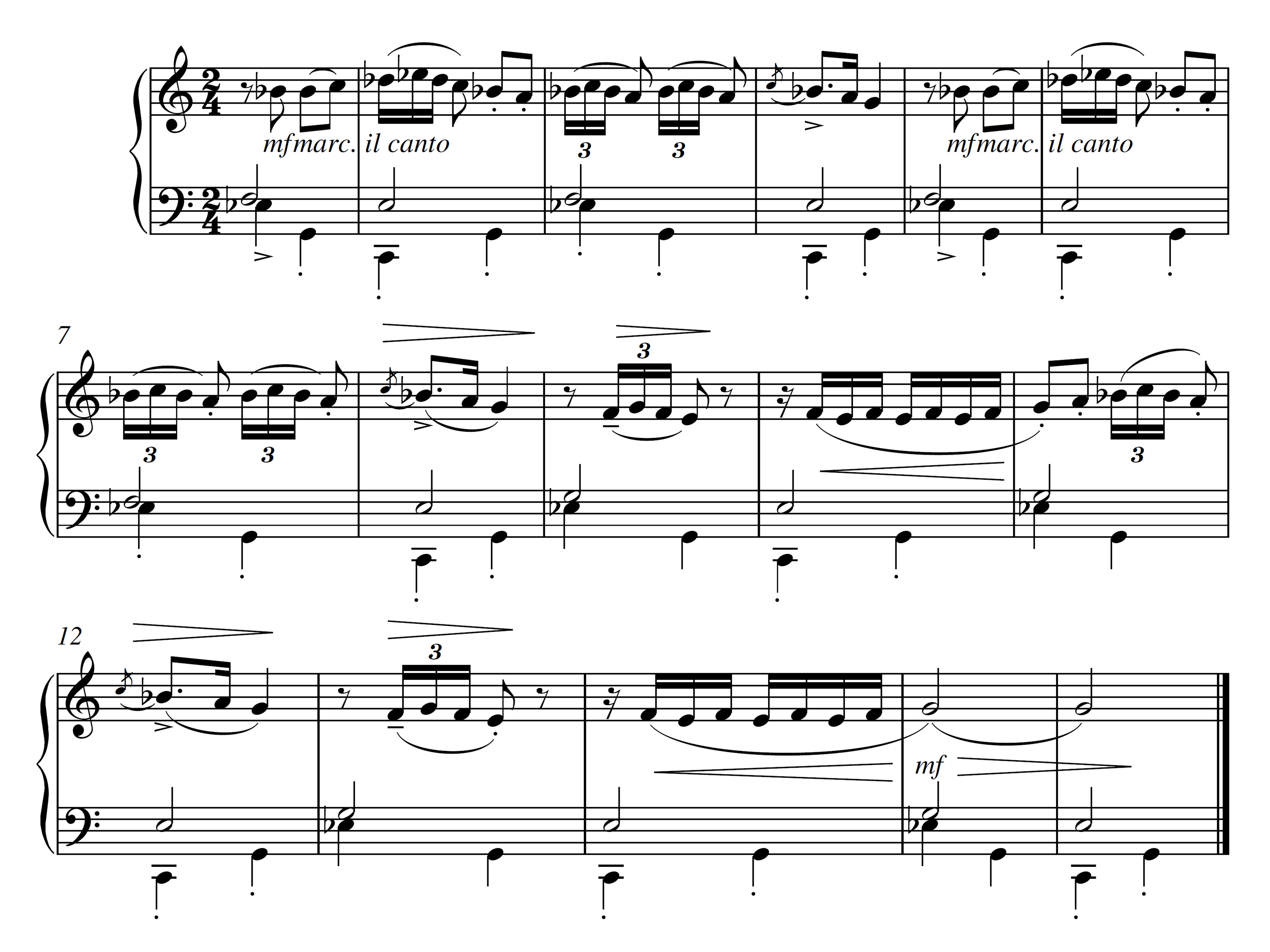
Main theme

The piece has an Allegro ma non troppo tempo (=126) and is in C major. The structure of the piece is an A–B–C–A–B–C–coda form. The first section starts with 23 bars of trills from the piano. The dynamics of this section change frequently from pianissimo (pp) to mezzo forte (mf). For 14 bars, there is then a section for melody and accompaniment. Candélas then enters with two bars of "Ah!"s. The piano then follows with two bars of octave chords. There is then a question and answer section between Candélas and the piano, one bar at a time, for 17 bars. There are then trills for the piano for a further 8 bars. A quaver–quaver rest–quaver–quaver rest pattern follows with straight crotchets for 8 bars. A melody then comes in above the base rhythm for 24 bars. The piano then has a large section of chords and (mainly) quavers for 33 bars. There are then trills for one bar and another quaver–quaver rest–quaver–quaver rest pattern with a straight crotchet accompaniment for 4 bars. There are then 20 bars of more trills. A section with melody and accompaniment then follows. The above section then repeats. However, as the repeat is not complete, the third movement is then cut off half way through by an ascending scale of triplets for four bars.

Here the tempo changes to Più mosso, ma giusto. This is the coda. Semiquavers then follow for two three bar phrases of ascending scales. Candélas then has "Ah!"s at the start of every other following bar for the next four bars. These bars finish with semiquavers and then an ascending scale. There are then crotchet chords for 15 bars. A descending arpeggio and low final note finish the piece.

== Recordings ==
CD title	Length (minutes:seconds)	Record label	Recording date
Rubinstein Collection, Vol. 18	3:23	RCA Red Seal	1947
500 Classical Masterpieces	1:43 (Excerpt)	Vox Records	1992
40 Popular Classics	4:13	Castle Select Records	1999
Falla – Vocal & Orchestral Works	4:15	EMI Classics	1999
Falla: La vida breve; El amor brujo; etc.	4:11	EMI Classics	2001
Classical Music 101	0:39 (Excerpt)	RCA Red Seal	2004
De Falla – El amor brujo, El retablo de maese Pedro, Fantasia Bætica	1:52	Mirare	2007

== See also ==
- List of works for the stage by Manuel de Falla
