= Louis de Froment =

French conductor

Louis de Froment (French: [də fʁɔmɑ̃]; 5 December 1921 – 19 August 1994) was a French conductor.

Froment was born into a French noble family in Toulouse, and started his musical studies at the city conservatory. He later attended the Conservatoire national supérieur de musique (CNSM) of Paris and was a pupil of Louis Fourestier, Eugène Bigot and André Cluytens. In 1948, he received a first prize in conducting.

Louis de Froment served as music director of orchestras at the casinos of Deauville and Cannes. He also worked as head of the permanent chamber orchestra of the radio in Nice (1958–59), of the Luxembourg Philharmonic Orchestra of Radio-Télé Luxembourg (1958–80), and also conducted the Orchestre National de la Radiodiffusion Française.

He conducted the premières of the Concerto Breve by Xavier Montsalvatge, with Alicia de Larrocha (piano) and the Barcelona Orchestra in 1953, and of the opera Les caprices de Marianne by Henri Sauguet at the Aix-en-Provence Festival in 1954.

His recordings include:

- C.W. Gluck: Orphée (Janine Micheau (Eurydice); Liliane Berton (L'Amour); Nicolai Gedda (Orphée)). Choeurs du Festival d'Aix-en-Provence, Flute: Lucien Lavaillotte, Paris Conservatoire Orchestra Pathé DTX 243 (LP)
- Jean-Jacques Rousseau: Le devin du village (Janine Micheau as Colette, Nicolai Gedda as Colin, Michel Roux as the soothsayer) Recorded April 1956. Columbia 33CX 1503.
- Camille Saint-Saëns: Symphony No. 1, Phaéton, Marche héroïque; Orchestra of Radio Luxembourg Vox Turnabout 37117 (LP issue)
- Wolfgang Amadeus Mozart: Clarinet Concerto, K. 622; Jacques Lancelot, clarinet; Oiseau Lyre Orchestra Decca DL 50006 (LP issue)
- Camille Saint-Saëns, The Five Piano Concertos, Gabriel Tacchino, piano, the Orchestre de Radio Luxembourg, conducted by Louis de Froment. Brillant classics 2014
- Claude Debussy: Khamma; Orchestra of Radio Luxembourg Vox
- Reinhold Glière: Harp Concerto in E-flat
- Manuel de Falla: Noches en los jardines de España, Concert pour clavecin, flûte, hautbois, clarinette, violon et violoncelle, Fantasía bética; Orchestre de La Radio de Luxemburg; piano: György Sándor; clavecin: Martin Galling. Recorded by VOX-USA, distributed by MARFER SA Espagne (ref. M.50.298 S), 1981.

Froment was the father of one daughter, Marie-José, by his first wife Reine Gabriel-Fauré. He died in Cannes in 1994, aged 72.
