= Antonio Navarro =

Antonio Navarro may refer to:

- Antonio García (racing driver) (Antonio Garcia Navarro, born 1980), Spanish professional racing driver
- Antonio Navarro Velasco (born 1936), Spanish Member of the European Parliament from 1986
- Antonio Navarro Wolff (born 1948), Colombian former guerrilla become politician
- José Antonio Navarro (1795–1871), Texas statesman, revolutionary, rancher, and merchant
- Luis Antonio García Navarro (born 1941), Spanish orchestral conductor
