= Psyché (Falla) =

Psyché is a 1924 work by the Spanish composer Manuel de Falla. It is scored for voice and chamber ensemble.

The piece reflects Falla's international links. The text by Georges Jean-Aubry, who worked for Falla's London publisher, is in French. It can also be seen as part of a neoclassical phase in the composer's work, like for example the harpsichord concerto. Apart from choosing a classical subject for the text, Falla uses a musical style which references 18th-century music. Apparently, Falla imagined a performance in the 18th century in which the classical story is told in the Peinador de la Reina (Queen's Dressing Room), a location in the Alhambra.

The work was composed in Granada, where the composer had settled. It was first performed in 1925 in Barcelona's Palau de la Música Catalana as part of a concert given by the Orquesta Betica de camara de Sevilla (this was an Andalusian orchestra, formed a couple of years earlier, to which the composer had links). The composer directed several of his works at the concert, including Psyché which was performed by:

- Singer: María Josepa Regnard
- Harp: Raquel Marti
- Flute: Miguel Perez
- Violin: Fermin Perez
- Viola: Fernando Romero
- Cello: Segismundo Romero

== Publication ==
Psyché was published by the composer's London publisher J. & W. Chester, Ltd. in 1927.
