= Alicia Nafé =

Argentinian opera singer (born 1947)

- Born: 4 August 1947 (age 78); Buenos Aires, Argentina
- Occupation: Operatic mezzo-soprano

Alicia Nafé (born 4 August 1947) is an Argentinian operatic mezzo-soprano, who has performed leading parts at international opera houses and festivals. She is known for singing the title role in Bizet's Carmen.

== Career ==
Born in Buenos Aires, Nafé first studied voice in her hometown, then continued her studies in Europe with Luigi Ricci in Rome, and Teresa Berganza. She won the Concours Francisco Viñas competition in Barcelona. She made her debut singing the alto part in Verdi's Requiem, and made her stage debut at the Teatro Real, Madrid, in 1971. In 1974, she performed the title role in Bizet's Carmen for the first time, at the Staatstheater Darmstadt. It became her signature role, which she also sang alongside Plácido Domingo in San Francisco and Chicago, and for her debut at the Metropolitan Opera in 1988, with Domingo as the conductor.

At the Bayreuth Festival, she appeared in 1975 and 1976 as a Flower Maiden in Parsifal, in 1976 also as Siegrune in Die Walküre, part of the Jahrhundertring, the centenary production of Wagner's Der Ring des Nibelungen conducted by Pierre Boulez and staged by Patrice Chéreau.

She was a member of the Hamburg State Opera from 1977 to 1981. In 1981, she performed the title role of Rossini's La Cenerentola at the Grand Théâtre de Genève, and the title role of his Béatrice et Bénédict at the Festival Berlioz in Lyon. In 1984, she appeared at La Scala as Idamante in Mozart's Idomeneo. In 1985, she performed Rosina in Rossini's The Barber of Seville at the Royal Opera House, and in 1987 Adalgisa in Bellini's Norma. In 1992, she appeared in the first performance in modern time of Bellini's first opera, Adelson e Salvini at the Teatro Massimo Bellini in Catania.

In 1989 she won the Konex Award as one of the five best opera singer in Argentina.

== Recordings ==
Nafé recorded de Falla's La vida breve twice, singing the role of La Abuela in 1978, conducted by Luis Antonio García Navarro, and the lead role of Salud in 1992, with Jesús López Cobos conducting the Cincinnati Symphony Orchestra.
