= Fernando de las Infantas =

Spanish nobleman, composer and theologian

Fernando de las Infantas (1534–ca. 1610) was a Spanish nobleman, composer and theologian.

== Life ==
Infantas was born in Córdoba in 1534, a descendant of Juan Fernández de Córdoba who had conveyed the two daughters, infantas (hence the surname), of Pedro I of Castile to safety after the Battle of Montiel in 1369. The family was still notable in Córdoba at the time of Fernando's birth and he enjoyed a privileged education, and later a patrimonio, or stipend, remitted to him in Rome from his family in Spain.

From 1572–1597 Infantas resided in Rome, voluntarily giving his services to a hospital for the poor. In 1577 Infantas came into conflict with Pope Gregory XIII and the composers Palestrina and Annibale Zoilo over the reversal of reforms in Gregorian chant, at one point causing his sponsor Philip II of Spain to instruct the Spanish ambassador in Spain to intercede with the Pope.

In 1584 Infantas took holy orders and served a small church on Rome's outskirts. He had returned to Spain by 1608 and presumably died around 1610.

== Theological controversies ==
From 1584 until his death, Infantas was constantly involved in theological debate. In later life he was embroiled in the regalist and Molinist controversies. His Treaty on Predestination (Paris, 1601), brought the charge of being an illuminist, if not a quietist, and the attention of the Spanish Inquisition. At the end of his life, overwhelmed by his theological enemies he was reduced to beggary and died in poverty.

Infantas' theological views may have influenced his preference, aside from the then standard Marian motets, for predominantly Biblical text settings in his publications. This is most notable in two almost unique settings of the Symbolum Apostolorum, a Credo according to the Apostles' Creed, not according to the ordinary of the mass. Infantas left no conventional mass setting. Michael Noone suggests that, although it is possible that Infantas may have been aware of a setting by the French composer Jean Le Brung printed in 1540, it is equally likely that Infantas believed his settings to be unique. A third setting was visibly absent from the Pater Noster sequence in Book III, possibly as a result of criticism.

== Works ==
Printed collections, Venice:

- 1578 Op. 1 Sacrarum Cantionum Liber I. 1st Book of Motets, 37 motets for 4 voices.
- 1578 Op. 2 Sacrarum Cantionum Liber II. 2nd Book of Motets, 30 motets for 5 voices.
- 1579 Op. 3 Sacrarum Cantionum Liber III. 3rd Book of Motets, a 6.
- 1579 Op. 4 Plura modulationum. 101 exercises in 2 to 8 parts on the ten-note Gregorian chant initium of Psalm 116:1.

Notable individual works:

- Psalm Congregati sunt. Surtitled In oppressione inimicorum (printed in Book III) Prayer for victory over the Ottoman navy and lifting of the Turkish siege of Malta. 1565.
- Psalm Ecce quam bonum. For the Sacred Treaty of 1570 for the Holy League between Venice, Spain and Rome for defence against the Ottoman navy.
- Canticum Moysis (Song of Moses, Exodus 15) Pro victoria navali contra Turcas (Book II, No.5) Commemoration of the third Battle of Lepanto (1571). This is the only known commemoration motet for one of Spain's most notable victories.
- Dum preliatur Michael. Only polyphonic setting of this text from the 16th century.

== Literature ==
Michael Lamla: Kanonkünste im barocken Italien, insbesondere in Rom. dissertation.de, Berlin 2003, ISBN 3-89825-556-5 (vor allem Band 2, S. 475 - 499).

== Recordings ==
- Fernando de las Infantas: Motetes. Ensemble Plus Ultra, dir. Michael Noone. Documentos Sonoros del Patrimonio Musical de Andalucía, Centro de Documentación Musical de Andalucía. CD Almaviva, 2004.
