= Siete canciones populares españolas =

1914 set of traditional Spanish songs

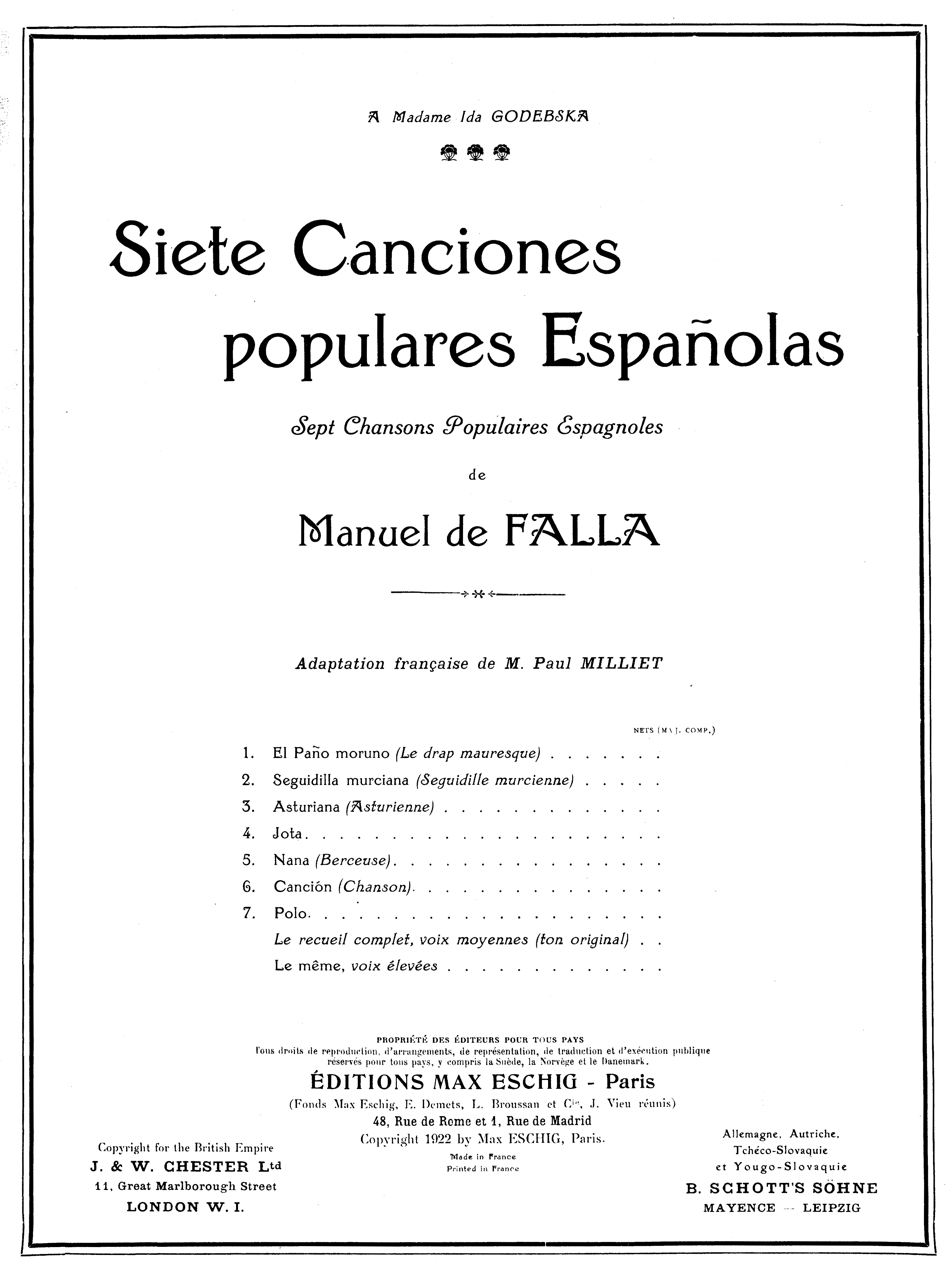
Max Eschig's edition of Siete Canciones populares Españolas. The work was first published in 1922.

Siete Canciones populares Españolas ("Seven Spanish Folksongs") is a 1914 set of traditional Spanish songs arranged for soprano and piano by the composer Manuel de Falla. Besides being Falla's most-arranged composition and one of his most popular, it is one of the most frequently performed sets of Spanish-language art songs.

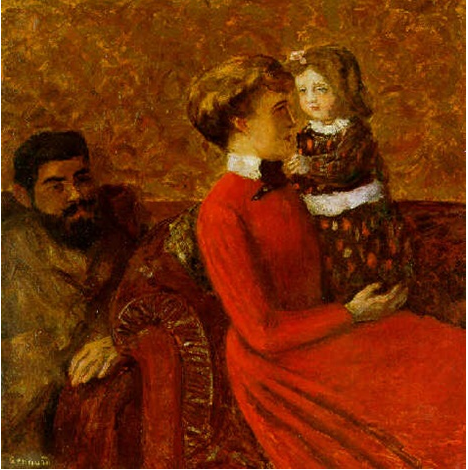
The Godebski family

The set was dedicated to Madame Ida Godebska, a patron of music who Falla met while living in Paris. Falla returned to Spain in 1914 and in January the following year the work was premiered at the Ateneo in Madrid by Luisa Vela with Falla at the piano. Luisa Vela was a well known zarzuela singer of the time who had sung in the Spanish premiere of La vida breve the previous year.

The styles and provenance of the songs are strikingly diverse. They are from different parts of Spain: an asturiana is from Asturias, in the north; the seguidilla, a type of flamenco, from Murcia, in the southeast, "Jota" is from Aragón in the northeast.

== Songs ==
The songs are

1. El paño moruno (The Moorish Cloth)
2. Seguidilla murciana
3. Asturiana
4. Jota
5. Nana
6. Canción
7. Polo

== Lyrics ==
All the texts deal with love and the courting process, whether playfully, seriously, or tragically. The first song, for example, alludes to the importance of virginity to a girl's value on the marriage market, though the text itself is about a shop reducing the price of a delicate cloth due to a stain. "Nana" is a lullaby: it deals with love's outcome. "Polo" expresses a wild desire for revenge on an unfaithful lover.

== Arrangements ==
Falla and Paul Kochanski arranged six of the songs (omitting No. 2 and changing the order) for violin as Suite populaire Espagnole. This arrangement has been further adapted, by Maurice Maréchal for cello and piano, and by Werner Thomas-Mifune for an ensemble of six celli. They have been arranged for guitar by Miguel Llobet and for orchestra by Ernesto Halffter, student and friend of Falla, in 1951, and Luciano Berio in 1978.

== Recordings ==
Falla recorded the work with Maria Barrientos, a coloratura soprano who had retired from the operatic stage to concentrate on concert performances.

Other singers to have recorded the work include

- Victoria de los Ángeles soprano; Gerald Moore, piano
- the mezzo-soprano Teresa Berganza in the 1960s and with Juan Antonio Álvarez Parejo in 1986
- the cantaora Estrella Morente with Javier Perianes. Morante's 2016 disc also features Canciones españolas antiguas, a similar folksong collection by Falla's friend and collaborator Federico García Lorca.

Norwegian trumpet soloist Tine Thing Helseth recorded them on trumpet on her self-titled album "Tine" (2013), employing a cup mute in at the end of No. 4 and throughout No. 5.

== Sources ==
- Hess, Carol A. (2005). Sacred Passions: The Life and Music of Manuel de Falla. Oxford University Press. ISBN 978-0-19-514561-8.
- Park, Jihyun (2013). A Study of Siete canciones populares Españolas by Manuel de Falla (Thesis). hdl:1808/13012. CORE output ID 213403710 ProQuest 1497967215.
