= Soneto a Córdoba =

- by Manuel de Falla
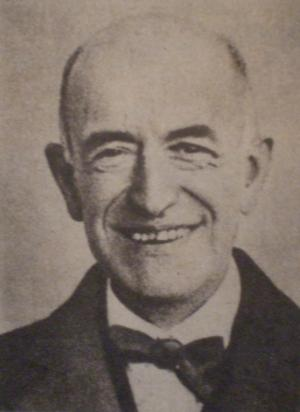
- Manuel de Falla in 1919
- English: Sonnet to Córdoba
- Full title: Soneto a Córdoba de Luis de Góngora
- Year: 1927
- Occasion: Tricentenary of Luis de Góngora's death
- Text: Luis de Góngora's A Córdoba (1585)
- Language: Spanish
- Time: 2/4
- Dedication: Eugenia Erráruriz
- Published: 1932 – London
- Publisher: Oxford University Press; J. & W. Chester
- Recorded: 1930 – Paris
- Duration: 3 minutes approx.
- Movements: 1
- Scoring: Voice and harp (or piano)

Soneto a Córdoba (in English: Sonnet to Córdoba), originally and alternatively entitled Soneto a Córdoba de Luis de Góngora, is a short piece for high voice and harp by Spanish composer Manuel de Falla. Based on a text by poet Luis de Góngora, it was finished in 1927.

== Background ==
Soneto a Córdoba was written after the sonnet A Córdoba (1585) by Luis de Góngora, with the incipit "¡Oh excelso muro, oh torres coronadas!" ("Oh lofty wall, oh towers crowned"). Composed to commemorate the tricentenary of Góngora's death, It was finished in 1927 in Granada, Spain, in the same city that the original poem was written. It was premiered on May 14, 1927, at the Salle Pleyel in Paris. The premiere was given by Magdeleine Greslé and harpist Lucile Adèle Wurmser-Delcourt. The piece was dedicated to Eugenia Erráruriz. It was initially published by Oxford University Press in 1932, and has been reprinted by J. & W. Chester since 1956.

== Structure ==
Textually, the piece follows the form of a sonnet, as it uses the full, unabridged poem. It was originally scored for high voice and harp, even though Falla authorized for it to be accompanied by a piano instead of a harp. It is in the key of D major and has an approximate duration of three minutes. Initially marked Lento assai (con lirica esaltazione), the piece features a sole melodic line sung by the voice, with the harp (or piano) playing arpeggiated chords in the background. It is in an unchanging 2/4 and features a few tempo changes, with all the markings in Italian. The text was translated by John Brande Trend for the published version of the score.

== Recordings ==
Spanish soprano Maria Barrientos performed the first recording of the piece with de Falla at the piano. The recording was taken on June 5, 1930, in Studio Albert, in Paris.
