= El retablo de maese Pedro =

Puppet-opera composed by Manuel de Falla

- Puppet-opera by Manuel de Falla
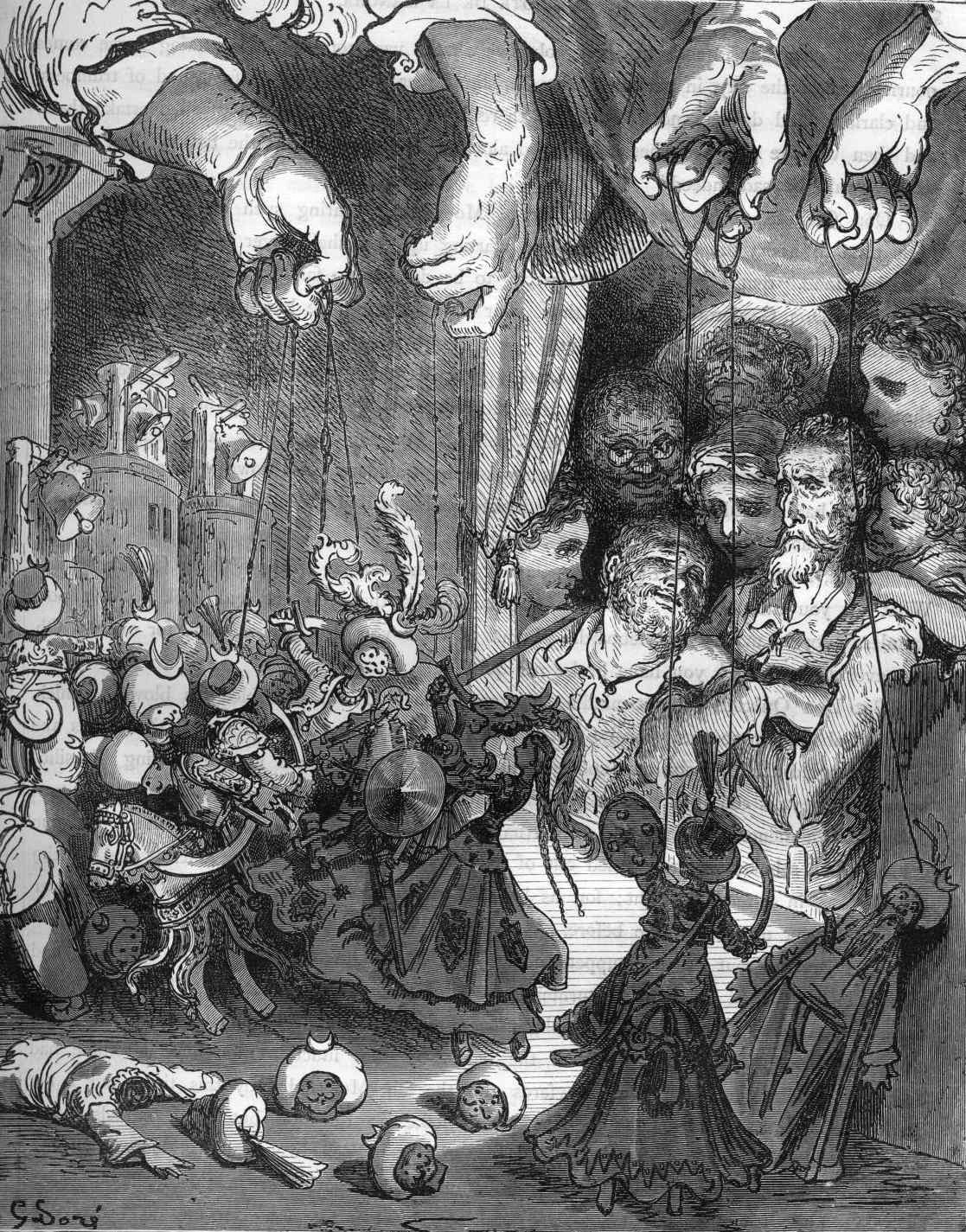
- Don Quixote watching Master Peter's puppet show, an illustration by Gustave Doré from Don Quixote, chapter 26, the scene which inspired the work
- Translation: Master Peter's Puppet Show
- Language: Spanish
- Based on: Don Quixote by Miguel de Cervantes
- Premiere: 25 June 1923; Salon of Edmond de Polignac, Paris

El retablo de maese Pedro (Master Peter's Puppet Show) is a puppet-opera in one act with a prologue and epilogue, composed by Manuel de Falla to a Spanish libretto based on an episode from Don Quixote by Miguel de Cervantes. The libretto is an abbreviation of chapter 26 of the second part of Don Quixote, with some lines added from other parts of the work. Falla composed this opera "in devoted homage to the glory of Miguel de Cervantes" and dedicated it to the Princess de Polignac, who commissioned the work. Because of its brief length by operatic standards (about 27 minutes), its very challenging part for a boy opera performer (who has by far the most lines), and its use of puppets, it is not part of the standard operatic repertoire.

Otto Mayer-Serra has described this opera as a work where Falla reached beyond "Andalusianism" for his immediate musical influence and colour and began the transition into the "Hispanic neo-classicism" of his later works.

== Performance history ==
In 1919 Winnaretta Singer, also known as the Princesse Edmond de Polignac, commissioned from Falla a piece that could be performed in her salon, using her own elaborate puppet theater. (Her other commissions included Igor Stravinsky's Renard and Erik Satie's Socrate, although neither of those works had its premiere in her private theater.) The work was completed in 1923. Falla decided to set an episode from Cervantes' Don Quixote that actually depicts a puppet play. Don Quixote watches a puppet show and gets so drawn into the action that he seeks to rescue the damsel in distress, only to destroy poor Master Peter's puppet theater in the process.

Falla's original plan for the Princess's theater was a two-tiered, play-within-a-play approach: large puppets representing Quixote, Master Peter, and the others in attendance, and small figures for Master Peter's puppets. The three singers would be with the orchestra in the pit, rather than onstage. After a concert performance in Seville on 23 March 1923, that is how it was performed with the Princess's puppets in the music room of her Paris estate on 25 June of that year, with Vladimir Golschmann conducting. Hector Dufranne sang Don Quijote (Quixote), Wanda Landowska played the harpsichord (Falla composed his 1926 Harpsichord Concerto for her in appreciation), and Ricardo Viñes and Emilio Pujol were among the artists and musicians serving as stagehands. Also at the premiere was Francis Poulenc, who met Landowska for the first time; she asked him to write a harpsichord concerto for her, and his Concert champêtre was the result.

=== Premieres ===
The world premiere was given as a concert performance on 23 March 1923 at the Teatro San Fernando, Seville, Spain. It was conducted by the composer.

The staged premiere took place on 25 June 1923 at the Palace of the Princess of Polignac in Paris. It was conducted by Vladimir Golschmann, with sets and puppets by Hermenegildo Lanz, Manuel Ángeles Ortiz, José Viñes Roda and Hernando Viñes. The staging was under the direction of Manuel de Falla.

The premiere was attended by the poets, musicians, and painters who comprised the exclusive court of the Princess de Polignac. Five days later, Corpus Barga published a report in El Sol with verbal portraits of some of those present: Paul Valéry, "the poet of the day, making gestures like a shipwrecked man drowning in the waves of feminine shoulders"; Stravinsky, "a mouse among the cats" and Pablo Picasso "in evening dress, and mobbed by everybody, [who] seems as though he is resting in a corner with his hat pulled down over one eyebrow", and the artist José Maria Sert.

=== Later performances ===
Falla went on to tour the piece quite successfully throughout Spain with the Orquesta Bética, a chamber orchestra he had founded in 1922. El retablo de maese Pedro was a great success for Falla, with performances and new productions all over Europe within a few years of the premiere. In 1926 the Opéra-Comique in Paris celebrated Falla's 50th birthday with a program consisting of La vida breve, El amor brujo, and El retablo de maese Pedro. That performance used new designs by Falla's close friend, the artist Ignacio Zuloaga, and new marionettes carved by Zuloaga's brother-in-law, Maxime Dethomas. For this production singers and extras replaced the large puppets, and Falla and Zuloaga took part personally, with Zuloaga playing Sancho Panza and Falla playing the innkeeper. Also in 1926, in April, Luis Buñuel directed the opera in Amsterdam, using real actors for some of the roles. Later performances have frequently used singers and actors to replace the puppets. José Carreras made his operatic debut at age 11 as the boy narrator, Trujamán, in a 1958 production conducted by José Iturbi at the Gran Teatre del Liceu. In 2004 it was performed at Hofstra University for a gathering of Cervantes specialists.

== Roles ==
Role	Voice type	Premiere cast, 25 June 1923 (Conductor: Vladimir Golschmann)
Don Quijote (Don Quixote)	bass or baritone	Hector Dufranne
Maese Pedro (Master Peter)	tenor	Thomas Salignac
Trujamán, the boy	boy soprano (in audio recordings, frequently sung by a woman)	Amparito Peris
Sancho Panza	non-singing	
The innkeeper	non-singing	
A student	non-singing	
The page	non-singing	
Men with lances and halberds

== Instrumentation ==
Ensemble: flute (doubling piccolo), 2 oboes, English horn, clarinet, bassoon, 2 horns, trumpet, percussion (bell, tenor drum, rattles, tambourine, tam-tam, xylophone), timpani, harpsichord, harp-lute (or harp), strings.

== Synopsis ==
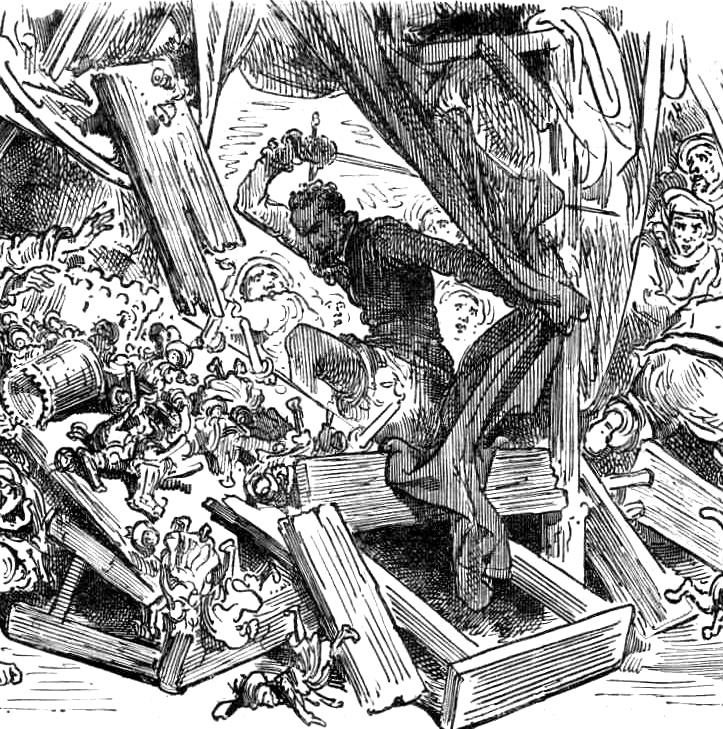
In scene 6, Don Quixote, convinced that the puppets are real, destroys the puppet theatre. Illustration by Gustave Doré from Don Quixote, chapter 26

Time: between 1605 and 1615
Place: The stable of an inn at an unidentified location in La Mancha de Aragón, Spain
Note: The story of Gaiferos and Melisendra is fictitious, although it is presented as historical by Maese Pedro and the trujamán, and taken as such by the mad Don Quijote.

El pregón (The announcement). Master Peter, the puppeteer, appears ringing a bell, with a monkey on his shoulder. He calls for attention and announces the performance of "The Tale of Melisendra", a story about the alleged daughter of Charlemagne who was held captive by Moors in Zaragoza. "Vengan, vengan, a ver vuesas mercedes el Retablo de la libertad de Melisendra" ("Come, come and see, my lords, The Tale of Melisendra's Freedom"). The audience comes in, Don Quixote being ushered to an honored place in the front row.

Historia de la libertad de Melisendra (Tale of the rescue of Melisendra, introduction). The narration is sung by Master Peter's apprentice (the Boy or Trujamán): he begins introducing the subject. "Esta verdadera historia..." (This true story...).

Scene 1. La corte de Carlomagno (Charlemagne's court). The palace of Charlemagne. Melisendra, the emperor’s alleged daughter, is held captive in Zaragoza by the Moorish king Marsilio. Her husband Don Gayferos, who has forgotten Melisendra, is playing chess with Don Roland. Charlemagne is angry and urges Don Gayferos to action. The latter refuses the help of Roland, saying that he himself is sufficient to rescue Melisendra. The scene is acted after the narrative explanation, the two knights rising from their game as the Emperor enters to appropriately stately music and confronts Don Gayferos, striking him with his scepter, before turning away. Left alone, the two knights quarrel and Don Gayferos storms out in anger.

Scene 2. Melisendra. "Ahora verán la torre del Alcázar de Zaragoza..." (Now, you see the tower of the castle of Zaragoza"). On a balcony of the tower, probably her prison, we see Melisendra, thinking of Paris and her husband. A Moor approaches stealthily and steals a kiss from her; she speedily cleans her lips and calls for help. King Marsilio witnessed this stolen kiss, and orders the guards to seize the insolent Moor. He is taken through the streets to the town square, where Marsilio's sentence of two hundred blows is carried out.

The boy adds that among the Moors justice is very speedy, not like it is in Christian Spain. Don Quixote objects that the boy is getting off the subject: "Niño, niño, seguid vuestra historia línea recta..." ("Boy, boy: tell your tale straightforwardly"). Master Peter tells the boy to keep to the story, without embellishments. The puppeteer returns to his booth and Don Quixote sits down.

Scene 3. El suplicio del moro (The Moor's punishment). The Moorish soldier is punished: the blows he receives are in time with the music. The Moor falls and is dragged away by the guards.

Scene 4. Los Pirineos (The Pyrenees). Don Gayferos is riding to rescue Melisendra, going over a mountain (the Pyrenees). He is wrapped in a long cloak and carries a hunting-horn, which he blows at moments specified in the score. The curtain closes again and the boy describes how Melisendra, at the window of her tower, talks to Gayferos, thinking he is a passing stranger. She quotes an old poem (romance), asking him to ask in Paris for Don Gayferos. The knight reveals his identity, at which Melisendra is very happy, climbing down from the balcony. Don Gayferos picks her up and sets her behind him on his horse, setting off for Paris.

Scene 5. La fuga (The escape). Part of the action of Scene 4 is repeated. Melisendra, in the tower. beckons to Gayferos to approach, climbs down from the tower, and rides behind him on his horse. They ride off trotting, and the curtain closes. The boy wishes them well, as true lovers, and a safe arrival home, with happy lives, which he hopes are as long as Nestor's. Master Peter shows his face to tell the boy to keep to the point. "Llaneza, muchacho, no te encumbres, que toda afectación es mala" (Simplicity, boy, don't elaborate too much; affectation is bad). The curtain now opens for the last time, showing King Marsilio running to get his guards, who depart immediately.

Scene 6. La persecución (The pursuit). Marsilio sounds the alarm, and the city is in turmoil, with bells ringing from all the minarets. Don Quixote jumps up to object that this is ridiculous ("Eso no, que es un gran disparate": "That's not right, it's a big mistake"); the Moors did not have bells, only drums and shawms. Master Peter shows his head again to tell Don Quixote not to be such a stickler for accuracy, since plays are frequently full of errors and are successful all the same. Don Quixote agrees.

The Moorish soldiers pursue the "Catholic lovers". The boy expresses the fear that they will catch the pair, and will bring them back tied to the tail of their own horse (dragged). At this point Don Quixote cannot restrain himself, and addresses the puppets: "Alto, malnacida canalla, non les sigáis ni persigáis, si no, conmigo sois en batalla" ("Stop, low-born rabble, don't follow them, or you'll have to fight with me").

Finale. Continuing to insult the Moors, in archaic, chivalric language, the furious Don Quijote uses his sword to destroy the puppets. He declares that here is proof of the usefulness of knights-errant: "¡Quisiera yo tener aquí delante aquellos que no creen de cuanto provecho sean los caballeros andantes!": "I wish those who say knights-errant are of no use could see this!". He also declares his dedication to his imaginary lady, Dulcinea ("señora de mi alma, día de mi noche, gloria de mis penas, norte de mis caminos": figuratively "owner of my soul, light in my darkness, glory of my suffering, my destination"). Master Peter can only complain in despair at the havoc wrought on his puppets.

== Musical analysis ==
The work's musical idiom departs from the Andalusian taste of Falla's earlier compositions, drawing instead on medieval and Renaissance sources. For the narrator’s part, Falla adapted the sung public proclamations, or "pregones", of the old Spanish villages. Falla borrowed themes from the Baroque guitarist Gaspar Sanz, the 16th-century organist and theorist Francisco Salinas, and Spanish folk traditions (but Castilian folk music, not Andalusian), in addition to his own evocative inventions. His scoring, for a small orchestra featuring the then-unfamiliar sound of the harpsichord, was thought to be lean, pungent, neo-classical in a highly personal and original way, and pointedly virtuosic. The output was a completely original piece of music, apparently simple, but of a great richness. The match of music and text is one of the greatest achievements of the work; Spanish language finds here a genuine musical expression like never before.

From Celebrating Don Quixote by Joseph Horowitz:

The work is surprisingly theatrical. It bristles with wit and limitless panache. It percolates with such subtle details as Don Quixote's long and ungainly legs – the only part of him which remains visible once Master Peter's production begins; "during the show," Falla specifies, "they will remain in view, sometimes at rest, sometimes crossed over one another." Beyond praise is Falla's juxtaposition of his two puppet casts and the pacing that propels their climactic convergence when Don Quixote rises to intervene for Melisandra (at which point the other puppet spectators crane their necks to better observe the action). This peak, cunningly scaled, recedes to an equally precise denouement: Don Quixote's closing salutation to knights errant (culled from a different chapter of the novel), with which he finally and fully pre-empts center stage.

== Publication ==
The score was published in London in 1924. The edition by J. & W. Chester presented the text in English and French (in translations by John Brande Trend and Georges Jean-Aubry respectively) as well as Spanish. Trend's version was based on Thomas Skelton's 17th century translation of Cervantes.

Dedication: "Très respectueusement dédié a Madame la Princesse Edmond de Polignac"

== Recordings ==
Audio

- 1950: Ataúlfo Argenta, cond.; E. D. Bovi (baritone), E. de la Vara (tenor), Lola Rodríguez de Aragón (sop.). Orq. Nacional de España. Columbia RG 16109-12 (1 disc 78 rpm)
- 1953: F. Charles Adler, cond.; Otto Wiener (baritone), Waldemar Kmentt (tenor), Ilona Steingruber (sop.). Wiener Staatsopernorchester. SPA-Records 43 (1 LP)
- 1953: Eduard Toldrà, cond.; Manuel Ausensi (baritone), Gaetano Renon (tenor), Lola Rodríguez de Aragón (sop.). Orc. National de la Radiodiffusion Française (Théatre Champs Elysées). Angel 35089 (2 LP); Columbia FXC 217 (1 LP); Fonit 303 (1 LP); EMI 569 235-2 (4 CD, 1996)
- 1954: Ernesto Halffter, cond.; Chano González (bass), Francisco Navarro (tenor), Blanca Seoane (sop.). Orc. Théatre Champs Elysées. Ducretet 255 C 070 (1 LP); MCA Classics MCAD 10481 (1 CD)
- 1958: Ataúlfo Argenta, cond. Raimundo Torres (bass), Carlos Munguía (tenor), Julita Bermejo (sop.). Orquesta Nacional de España. Decca TWS SXL 2260 (1 LP). RCA, London
- 1961: Pedro de Freitas Branco, cond.; Renato Cesari (baritone), Pedro Lavirgen (tenor), Teresa Tourné (sop.). Orq. de Conciertos de Madrid. Erato; Grande Musique d'Espagne GME 221 (1 CD)
- 1966: Ernesto Halffter, cond.; Pedro Farrés (bass), José María Higuero (tenor), Isabel Penagos (sop.). Orq. Radiotelevisión Español. Live from Teatro de la Zarzuela performance. Almaviva (1996) (1 CD)
- 1967 (p)1972: Rafael Frühbeck de Burgos, cond.; Victor de Narké (baritone), Julian Molina (tenor), Fermin Gomara (boy treble). Orquesta Filarmonía de España. Columbia CS8556 (1LP)
- 1973: Odón Alonso, cond.; Pedro Farrés (baritone), Julio Julián (tenor), Isabel Penagos (sop.). Orq. alla Scala of Milan. Zafiro (1 LP)
- 1977: Charles Dutoit, cond.; Manuel Bermúdez (bar.), Tomás Cabrera (ten.), Ana Higueras-Aragón (sop.). Instrumental Ensemble. Erato STU 70713
- 1980: Simon Rattle, cond.; Peter Knapp (baritone), Alexander Oliver (tenor), Jennifer Smith (sop.). London Sinfonietta. Argo ZRG 921 (1 LP); Decca 433 908-2 (2 CD)
- 1990: Josep Pons, cond.; Iñaki Fresán (baritone); Joan Cabero (tenor), Joan Martín (boy treble). Orq. de Cambra del Teatre Lliure (Barcelona). Harmonia Mundi HMC 905213 (1 CD)
- 1991: Robert Ziegler, cond.; Matthew Best (bar.), Adrian Thompson (ten.), Samuel Linay (treble).Matrix Ensemble. ASV CDDCA 758 (1 CD)
- 1994: Eduardo Mata, cond.; William Alvarado (bar.), Miguel Cortez (ten.), Lourdes Ambriz (sop.). Solistas de México. Dorian DOR 90214 (1 CD)
- 1997: Diego Dini-Ciacci, cond.; Ismael Pons-Tena (baritone), Jordi Galofré (tenor), Natacha Valladares (soprano). I Cameristi del Teatro alla Scala (Milan). Naxos 8.553499 (1 CD)
- 2007: Jean-François Heisser, cond. Jérôme Correas (baritone), Éric Huchet (tenor), Chantal Perraud (sop.). Orch. Poitou-Charentes. Mirare

Video

On 29 May 1938, the BBC presented a black-and-white television movie in English translation, using Thomas Shelton's version of Don Quixote adapted by J. B. Trend. Frederick Sharpe sang the role of Don Quixote, Jane Connard The Boy, and Perry Jones Master Peter. Hyam Greenbaum conducted the BBC Television Orchestra. Puppets were from Hogarth Puppets.

A filmed version in color of the opera is included on the DVD release Nights in the Gardens of Spain. and is available on YouTube. This is the same film version which was telecast by A&E in 1992, and features Justino Díaz as Don Quixote, Xavier Cabero as the Boy, and Joan Cabero (Xavier's father) as Maese Pedro, with Charles Dutoit conducting the Montreal Symphony Orchestra. In this production, the human characters are portrayed by real actors, while the puppets remain puppets. The production has been released without English subtitles, unlike the original telecast and the VHS edition. In the DVD edition, an English translation of the opera is included in the accompanying booklet. A LaserDisc version was released in 1990 both in Spain, on the PAL system, and in the U.S., on the NTSC system. The audio is also available on CD.
