= Fantasía Bética =

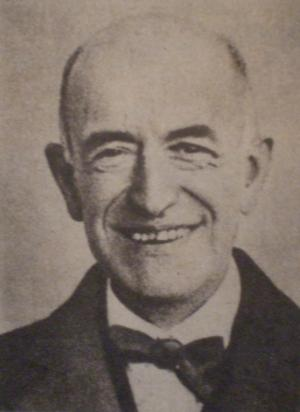
Manuel de Falla in 1919

The Fantasia Bætica (Latin), Fantasía bética (Spanish), or Andalusian Fantasy, is a 1919 piano composition by Manuel de Falla. The work is normally known by the Spanish version of its name, which like the Latin version, evokes the old Roman province of Baetis in southern Spain, today's Andalusia.

The piece was commissioned by Artur Rubinstein, who received the manuscript from the composer in 1919. He planned to perform it in Barcelona that year but did not learn it in time and so wound up giving the premiere in New York on 20 February 1920; as it turned out, he would play it only a few times before dropping it from his repertory without recording it.
