= Centro de Documentación Musical de Andalucía =

Musical Documentation Center of Andalusia
- Centro de Documentación Musical de Andalucía
- Abbreviation: CDMA
- Formation: 1987; 39 years ago
- Founder: Ministry of Culture of the Regional Government of Andalucía
- Type: Governmental
- Purpose: Cultural preservation
- Headquarters: Granada, Andalusia
- Location: Spain
- Coordinates: 37.17840°N 3.59310°W
- Official language: Andalusian Spanish
- Director: David Torres Gómez
- Publication: Música Oral del Sur; Papeles del Festival de Música Española de Cádiz
- Website: centrodedocumentacionmusicaldeandalucia.es

Musical Documentation Center of Andalusia (CDMA) is an organization created in 1987 by the Ministry of Culture of the Junta de Andalucía to recover, preserve, catalog, classify and disseminate the musical heritage created in or related to Andalusia in all forms.

Its current director is the musicologist Reynaldo Fernández Manzano. The singer Esteban Valdivieso (died 2008) was a director. It is located at C / Carrera del Darro 29-18010 Granada.

== Functions and purposes ==
1. Material recovery and dance music created by musicians in Andalucia, or Andalusia, or in relation to Andalusian music in all its forms: sheet music, sound and audiovisual recordings, manuscripts and all sorts of texts and objects related to it.
2. Maintenance funds and reference documents that address and enable the study of Andalusian music and musicians.
3. Custody, cataloging and classification of projects and funds of the Legal Deposit of Andalusia on sheet music and sound productions, in accordance with Decree 325/1984 of December 18, art. 20, paragraph b) (1.2.85 BOJA pp. 170–172)
4. The acquisition of a background on Spanish music and dance in particular and the universal in general.
5. Conducting research to its own.
6. The census of music and dance resources in each moment in Andalusia and its dissemination.
7. The spread of musical and dance heritage of Andalusia, the center's own funds and research, through public events, publishing, printing and recording with or without image, or any means for achieving this end.
8. The organization of activities related to matters within the Centre.
9. In general, the tasks arising from the functions of the preceding paragraphs.

== Unique musical collections ==
1. File Joaquin Turina (digitized).
2. File Ángel Barrios, from the correspondence to the manuscript score, from 1916 to 1964.
3. File Francisco Alonso, from 1900 to 1947.
4. Sound Archive of Juan de Loja.
5. File of the Rock of Silver, with recordings made from 1960 to today's date.
6. Historical Archive Music, microfilm collection of manuscripts in Andalusian cathedrals.
7. File Manuel Castillo, from 1949 to 1997.
8. File-Germain Alvarez Beigbeder, from 1898 to 1956.
9. Sound Archive of Oral Tradition of the Alpujarra: Festivals Trovo the Alpujarra collection.

== Legal deposit ==
Musical Documentation Center of Andalusia is the recipient of the Legal Deposit of musical scores and sound productions that are published in the autonomous community of Andalusia, thus contributing to the awareness of historical and cultural evolution, and the collection of all cultural records, for later dissemination for the benefit of the community.

Legal Deposit is of great importance and impact as a means of acquiring everything that is published in the Andalusian region; without this the collection would be much smaller. The theme is essentially music and Andalusia, there are also a number of sound recordings of modern pop music.

== Periodicals ==
Música Oral del Sur. Revista Internacional / Oral Sur Music. International Journal. Frequency: Biannual. ISSN 1138-8579 Founder and President: Reynaldo Fernández Manzano. Director of Musical Documentation Center of Andalusia. Scientific Director: Manuel Lorente Rivas. Prospective Cultural Observatory. Univ Granada - HUM 584. Chairman of Editorial Board: José Antonio González Alcantud. University of Granada

Papeles del Festival de Música Española de Cádiz / Papers Spanish Music Festival in Cadiz Frequency: Annual ISSN 1886-4023 President: Reynaldo Fernández Manzano. Director of Musical Documentation Center of Andalusia.
