= Manuel de Falla =

Spanish composer (1876–1946)

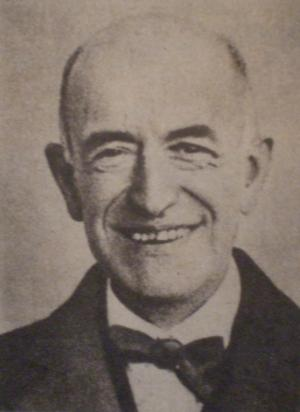
- Falla, 27 October 1919
- Born: Manuel María de los Dolores Falla y Matheu; 23 November 1876; Cádiz, Spain
- Died: 14 November 1946 (aged 69); Alta Gracia, Argentina
- Education: Madrid Conservatory
- Occupations: Composer; Pianist
- Works: List of compositions

Manuel de Falla y Matheu (Spanish pronunciation: [maˈnwel de ˈfaʎa], 23 November 1876, Cádiz, Spain – 14 November 1946, Alta Gracia, Argentina) was a Spanish composer and pianist. Along with Isaac Albéniz, Francisco Tárrega, and Enrique Granados, he was one of Spain's most important musicians of the first half of the 20th century. He has a claim to being Spain's greatest composer of the 20th century, although the number of pieces he composed was relatively modest.

== Biography ==
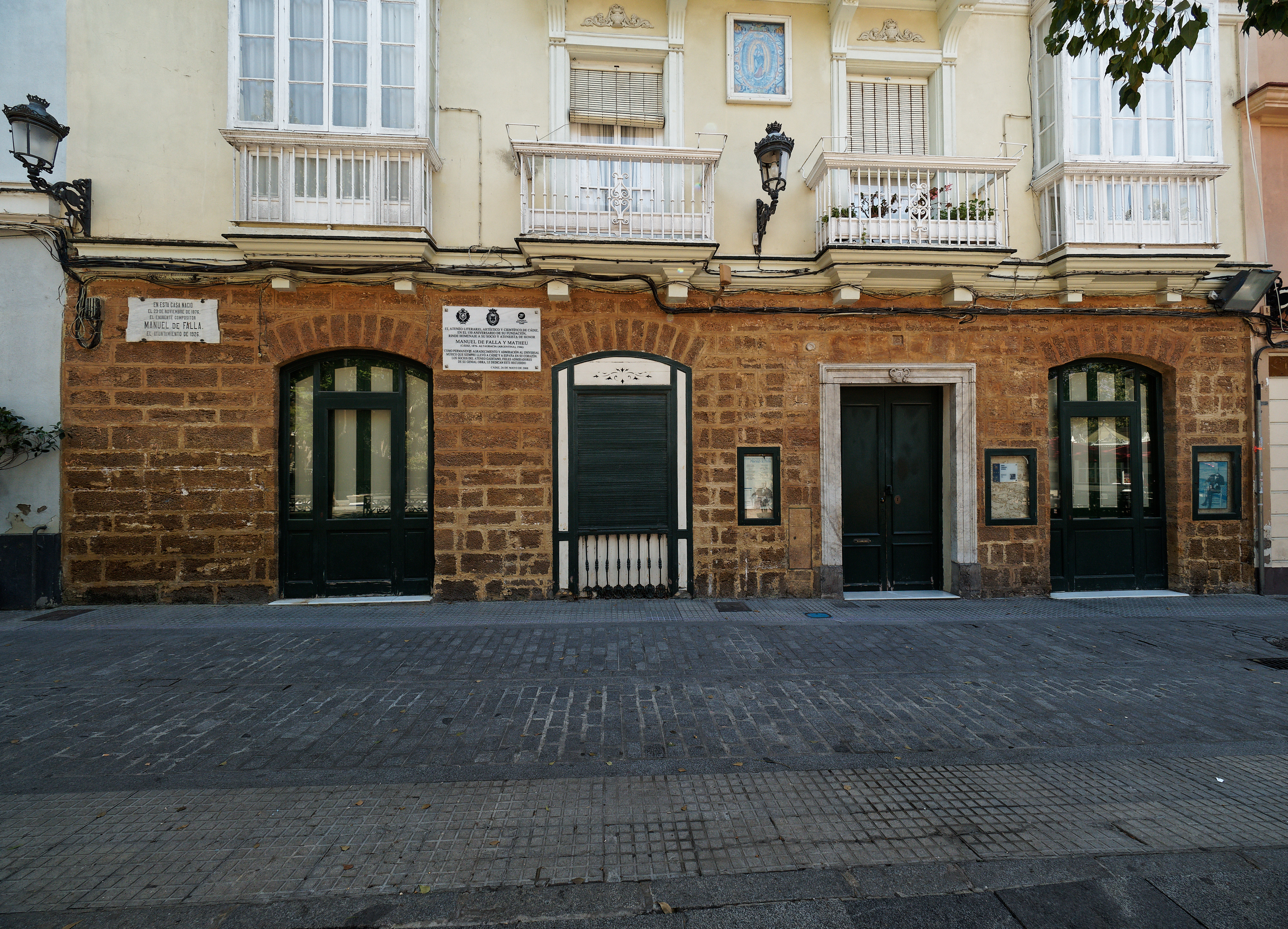
Birth house in Cádiz

Falla was born Manuel María de los Dolores Falla y Matheu in Cádiz. He was the son of José María Falla, a Valencian, and María Jesús Matheu, from Catalonia.

In 1889 he continued his piano lessons with Alejandro Odero and learned the techniques of harmony and counterpoint from Enrique Broca. At age 15 he became interested in literature and journalism and founded the literary magazines El Burlón and El Cascabel.

=== Madrid ===
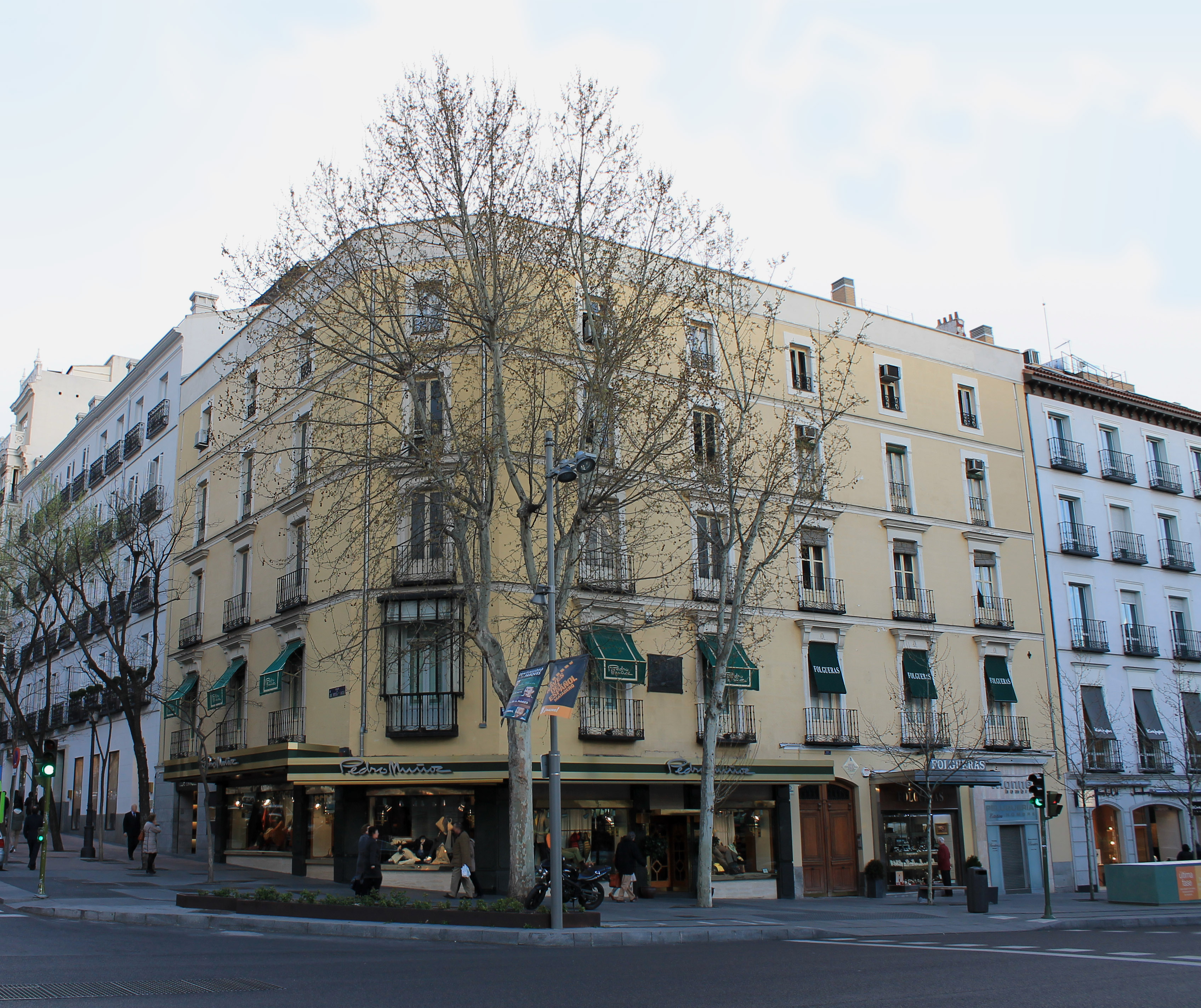
Building where Falla lived in Madrid from 1901 to 1907

By 1900 he was living with his family in the capital, where he attended the Real Conservatorio de Música y Declamación. He studied piano with José Tragó, a colleague of Isaac Albéniz, and composition with Felip Pedrell. In 1897 he composed Melodía for cello and piano and dedicated it to Salvador Viniegra, who hosted evenings of chamber music that Falla attended. In 1899, by unanimous vote, he was awarded the first prize at the piano competition at his school of music. He premiered his first works: Romanza para violonchelo y piano, Nocturno para piano, Melodía para violonchelo y piano, Serenata andaluza para violín y piano, and Cuarteto en Sol y Mireya. That same year he started to use de with his first surname, making Manuel de Falla the name he became known as from that time on. When only the surname is used, however, the de is omitted.

In 1900 he composed his Canción para piano and various other vocal and piano pieces. He premiered his Serenata andaluza y Vals-Capricho para piano in the Ateneo de Madrid. Due to the precarious financial position of his family, he began to teach piano classes.

It was from Pedrell, during the Madrid period, that Falla became interested in the music of his native Andalusia, particularly Andalusian flamenco (specifically cante jondo), the influence of which can be strongly felt in many of his works. Among his early pieces are a number of zarzuelas like La Juana y la Petra and La casa de tócame Roque. On 12 April 1902 he premiered Los amores de la Inés in the Teatro Cómico de Madrid. The same year he met the composer Joaquín Turina and saw his Vals-Capricho y Serenata andaluza published by the Society of Authors.

The following year he composed and performed Allegro de concierto for the Madrid Royal Conservatory competition. Enrique Granados took first prize with his composition of the same title, but the Society of Authors published Falla's works Tus ojillos negros and Nocturno. Falla then began his collaboration with composer Amadeo Vives on the zarzuelas Prisionero de guerra, El cornetín de órdenes and La cruz de Malta (only fragments of these works survive).

His first important work was the one-act opera La vida breve (Life is Short, or The Brief Life, written in 1905, though revised before its premiere in 1913). With a libretto by Carlos Fernández Shaw, La vida breve won Falla first prize in the Real Academia de Bellas Artes de San Fernando musical competition, with a prize of 2500 pesetas and a promise of a production at the Teatro Royal in Madrid—a pledge which unfortunately was not fulfilled In April 1905 he won the first prize in a piano competition sponsored by the firm of Ortiz and Cussó. On 15 May his work Allegro de concierto premiered at the Ateneo de Madrid and on 13 November the Real Academia presented him with his prize for La vida breve.

=== Paris ===
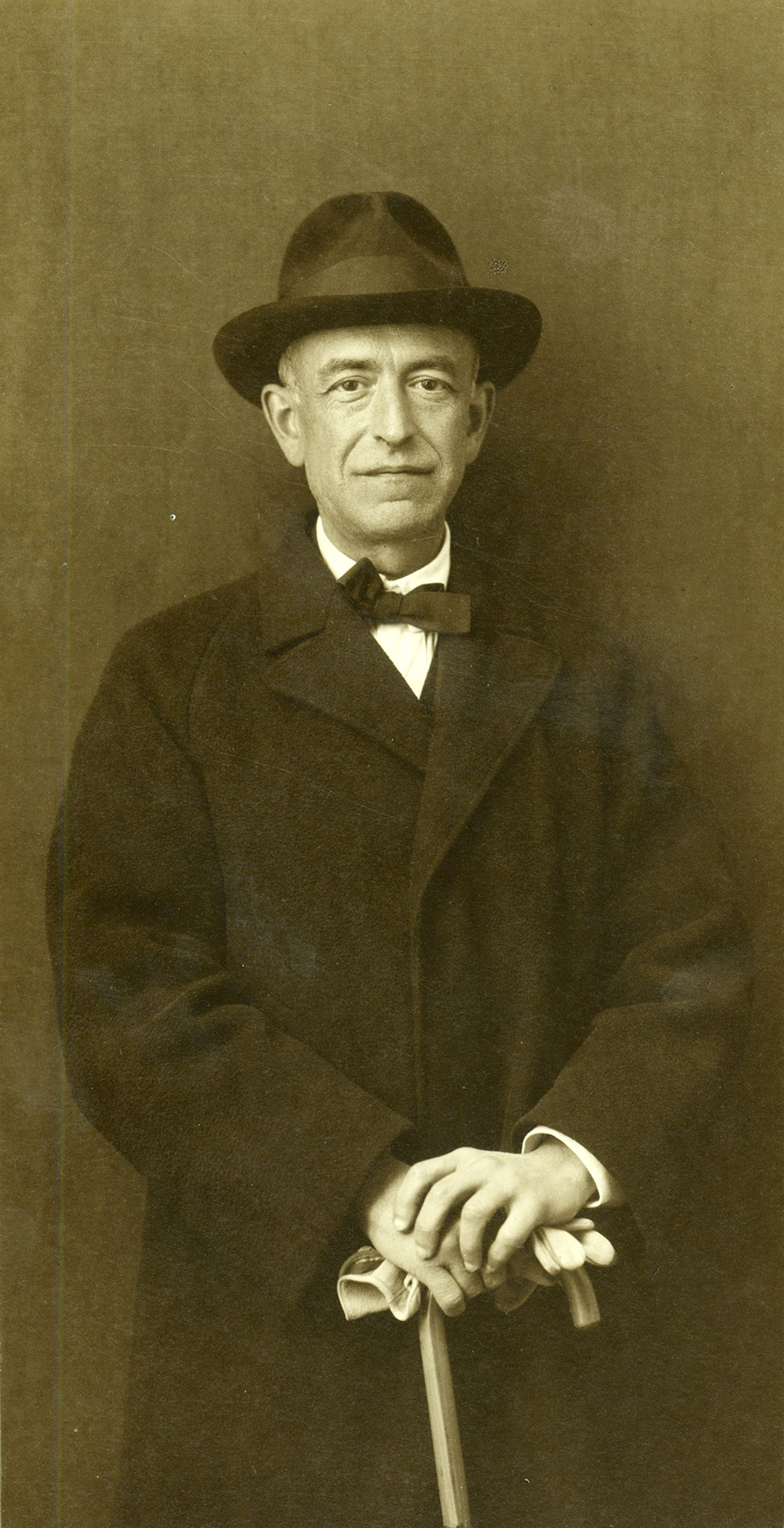
Manuel de Falla (date unknown)

Falla moved to Paris in 1907, where he remained for seven years. There he met a number of composers who had an influence on his style, including Maurice Ravel, Claude Debussy and Paul Dukas, as well as Igor Stravinsky, Florent Schmitt, Isaac Albéniz and the impresario Sergei Diaghilev. In 1908 King Alfonso XIII awarded him a royal grant that enabled him to remain in Paris while he finished his Cuatro piezas españolas. In 1910 Falla met Stravinsky and in 1911–12 traveled to London, Brussels and Milan to give concerts and investigate possible venues for La vida breve, which he had composed shortly after his arrival in Paris in 1907 but which, despite the support of Dukas and Falla's own best efforts, was not finally performed until 1 April 1913 at the Municipal Casino in Nice, with the libretto translated into French by the dramatist Paul Milliet. A second production was given the following year at the Opéra-Comique, to acclaim from critics such as Pierre Lalo and André Coeuroy. He wrote Siete canciones populares españolas, which he finished in mid-1914. Shortly after, World War I began, forcing Falla to return to Madrid. While at no stage was he a prolific composer, it was then that he entered into his mature creative period.

=== Return to Madrid ===
In Madrid he composed several of his best-known pieces, including:

- The nocturne for piano and orchestra Noches en los jardines de España (1916)
- The ballet El amor brujo (1915) which includes the much excerpted and arranged Danza ritual del fuego
- The ballet The Magistrate and the Miller's Wife (El corregidor y la molinera) which, after revision, became El sombrero de tres picos (1917) and was produced by Serge Diaghilev with set design and costumes by Pablo Picasso. It derives from The Three-Cornered Hat (1874), a novel written by Pedro Antonio de Alarcón.

=== Granada period ===
From 1921 to 1939 Manuel de Falla lived in Granada, where he organized the Concurso de Cante Jondo in 1922. In Granada he wrote the puppet opera El retablo de maese Pedro (Master Peter's Puppet Show, 1923) and a concerto for harpsichord and chamber ensemble (Harpsichord Concerto, 1926). The puppet opera marked the first time Falla included the harpsichord in his orchestra. Both of these works were written with Wanda Landowska in mind. In these works, the Spanish folk influence is somewhat less apparent than a kind of Stravinskian neoclassicism.

During the 1920s and 1930s, he frequently visited Barcelona and Catalonia and became associated with various Catalan artists, critics and intellectuals, such as Joan Lamote de Grignon, Oleguer Junyent, Frank Marshall, Rafael Moragas, Jaume Pahissa and Santiago Rusiñol. He showed great interest in the sound of the cobla and attended several concerts of the Cobla Barcelona. He also collaborated with various Catalan institutions, such as the Associació de Música Da Camera, the Banda Municipal de Barcelona or the Orquestra Pau Casals, with whom he premiered the Concerto for clave with Wanda Landowska. In 1925, after an honorary banquet held at the Hotel Majestic, Falla said: «I have to tell you, and I say it with all my soul, that, without the Catalans, I might not have been able to carry out my work, or to be who I am».

Also in Granada, Falla began work on the large-scale orchestral cantata Atlántida (Atlantis), based on the Catalan text L'Atlàntida by Jacint Verdaguer.

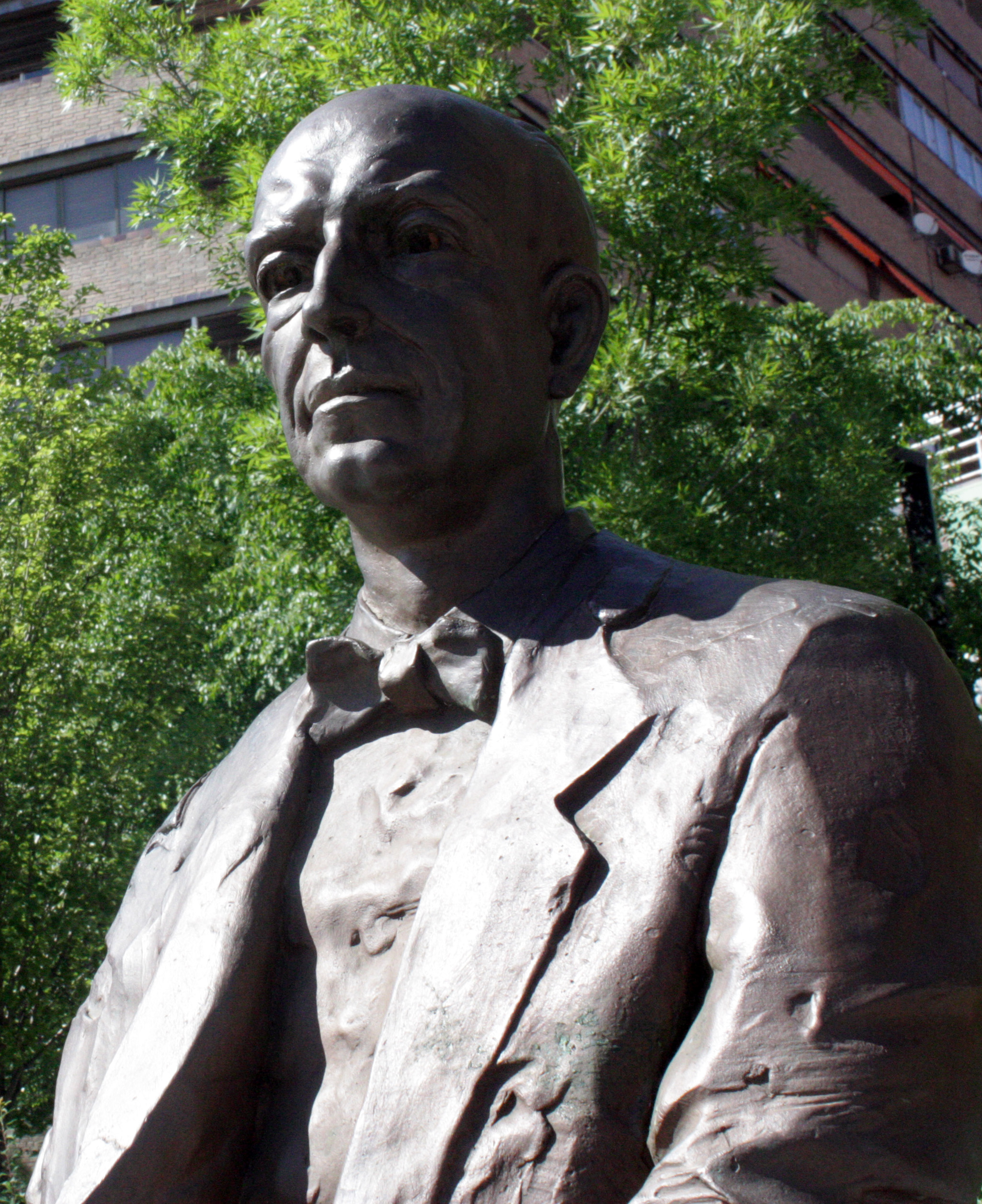
Statue of Falla on the Avenida de la Constitución in Granada, Spain

=== Argentina ===
Falla continued work on Atlántida after moving to Argentina in 1939, following Francisco Franco's victory in the Spanish Civil War. The orchestration of the piece remained incomplete at his death and was completed posthumously by Ernesto Halffter. He also premiered his Suite Homenajes in Buenos Aires in November 1939. In 1940, he was named a Knight of the Order of King Alfonso X of Castile. Franco's government offered him a large pension if he would return to Spain, but he refused.

Falla spent some time teaching whilst in exile; among his notable pupils was composer Rosa García Ascot. His health began to decline and he moved to a house in the mountains where he was tended by his sister María del Carmen de Falla (1882–1971).

Falla died of cardiac arrest on 14 November 1946 in Alta Gracia, in the Argentine province of Córdoba, 9 days before his 70th birthday. He had stipulated in writing that he wanted to be buried in the Sierras de Córdoba in Argentina. The Spanish Embassy of Francisco Franco took charge of his possessions when the family decided to bring him back to Spain. In 1947 his remains were brought back to Spain and entombed in Cádiz Cathedral. One of the lasting honors to his memory is the Manuel de Falla Chair of Music in the Faculty of Philosophy and Letters at Complutense University of Madrid. Manuel de Falla never married and had no children.

=== Works ===
Spanish Dance
Performed by Carrie Rehkopf

Popular Spanish Suite #1
Performed by John Michel

Popular Spanish Suite #5
Performed live by John Michel

== Honours ==
- 1935: Associate of the Royal Academy of Science, Letters and Fine Arts of Belgium.
- 1940: Knight Grand Cross of the Order of Alfonso X the Wise.
- Member of the Real Academia de Bellas Artes de San Fernando
- Member of the Real Academia de Bellas Artes de Nuestra Señora de las Angustias.

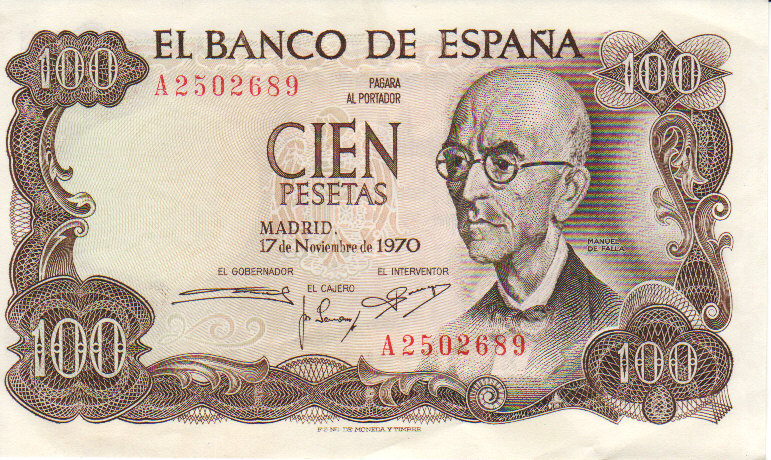
Falla on a former Spanish currency note (1970)

== Legacy ==
Falla's home in Granada was a villa overlooking the city which has been preserved as a biographical museum. In the 1970s a concert hall, the Auditorio Manuel de Falla, was built on an adjacent site. The hall opened with a concert of works by Falla. It has since become the home of the City of Granada Orchestra.

His image appeared on the Spanish 1970 100-pesetas banknote.

A station on Madrid Metro's Line 10 is named after him.

=== Recordings by Falla ===
- Manuel de Falla 1876–1946 Grabaciones históricas; Centro de Documentación Musical de Andalucía.
- Rollos de Pianola (Obras de Albéniz, Granados, Turina, Ocón, Chapí, Alonso y Otros) (Almaviva, DS - 0141) ASIN B000GI34D6
