= La vida breve (opera) =

Opera by Manuel de Falla

- Opera by Manuel de Falla
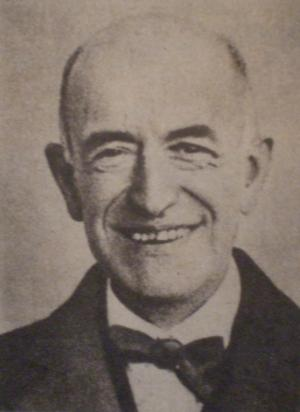
- The composer in 1919
- Translation: The Brief Life
- Librettist: Carlos Fernández-Shaw
- Language: Spanish (Andalusian dialect)
- Premiere: 1 April 1913 (in French, first version); Casino Municipal, Nice

La vida breve (Spanish: Life is Short or The Brief Life) is a two-act, four-scene opera that Manuel de Falla composed between August 1904 and March 1905 in Spain. The libretto, written by Carlos Fernández-Shaw, is set in Granada and uses the local language, Andalusian Spanish.

== Premiere and performance history ==
Unable to secure its premiere in Spain, Falla continued revising the score after moving to France. The premiere was given (in a French translation by Paul Millet) at the Casino Municipal in Nice on 1 April 1913. Paris and Madrid performances followed, later in 1913 and in 1914 respectively. Claude Debussy played a major role in influencing Falla to transform it from the number opera it was at its Nice premiere to an opera with a more continuous musical texture and more mature orchestration. This revision was first heard at the Paris premiere at the Opéra-Comique in December 1913, and is the standard version.

In October 1968, following a summer production run, La Vida Breve, directed by Basil Coleman and featuring soprano Margaret Price, became the first opera to be broadcast on BBC television in colour.

The complete opera is seldom performed today, even though its importance in the context of opera in Spanish is recognised and it was programmed for the reopening of the Teatro Real in 1997. However, its orchestral sections are often performed, especially the act 2 music published as Interlude and Dance, which is popular at concerts of Spanish music. (Fritz Kreisler in 1926 arranged for violin and piano the dance from this pairing under the spurious title Danse espagnole.) Indeed the opera is unusual for having nearly as much instrumental music as vocal: act 1, scene 2 consists entirely of a short symphonic poem (with distant voices) called Intermedio, depicting sunset in Granada; act 2, Scene 1 includes the above-referenced Danza and Interludio, with the latter ending the scene, i.e. in the opposite sequence to the excerpted pairing; and act 2, scene 2 begins with a second and longer Danza (with vocal punctuation).

Only an hour long, the opera is usually paired with another work in performance. For example, the English opera company Opera North gave an opportunity for it to be heard alongside Zemlinsky's Der Zwerg or Puccini's Il tabarro when they included among the short operas ('Eight Little Greats') which were performed in their 2003/2004 season.

The role of Salud is central to the action. It has been sung by, among others, soprano Victoria de los Ángeles, mezzo-soprano Teresa Berganza, mezzo Martha Senn, and, more recently, sopranos Cristina Gallardo-Domâs and Mary Plazas.

== Roles ==
Role	Voice type	Premiere Cast, 1 April 1913 (Conductor: Jacques Miranne)
Salud, a gypsy	soprano	Lillian Grenville
La abuela (Salud's grandmother)	mezzo-soprano	Renée Fanty
Paco	tenor	David Devriès
Tío Sarvaor (Salvador, Salud's grand uncle)	bass	Édouard Cotreuil
Carmela, the bride	mezzo-soprano	Mlle Gerday
Manuel, the bride's brother	baritone	Termany
Cantaor (Cantador, singer at the wedding)	baritone	
First saleswoman	contralto	Daurelly
Second saleswoman	mezzo-soprano	A Bernard
Salesman	bass	
Solo voice in forge chorus	tenor	Rouziery

== Synopsis ==
Time: 20th century
Place: Granada

=== Act 1 ===
Afternoon and sunset in the (gypsy) Albaicín district

A male chorus of anvil workers plies their trade at the local forge. The young gypsy, Salud, is passionately in love with a young well-to-do man named Paco. She does not know, and Paco does not tell her, that he is already engaged to a woman of his social class. Her uncle, Sarvaor (Salvador), and her grandmother (La abuela) have discovered this, and they try to prevent Salud from interrupting Paco's wedding after she learns the truth.

=== Act 2 ===
A wealthier part of the city: in front of a house on whose patio wedding festivities are in progress (and visible from the street), and then in the patio itself

Confrontation (which from several perspectives is the theme of the whole opera) occurs after Salud and Sarvaor gate-crash the festivities, astonishing the bride and the guests and momentarily throwing the mendacious groom so much off his guard that he utters Salud's name before denying he knows her and ordering her ejection. Her heart broken, Salud falls dead at his feet, in what is said to be the ultimate gesture of contempt for a former lover.

== Recordings ==
There are 11 complete recordings, as of February 2012. Cast key is Conductor / Salud, La abuela, Paco, El tío Sarvaor:

- Halffter / Victoria de los Ángeles, Rosario Gómez, Pablo Civil, Emilio Payá - His Master's Voice, 1954
- Toldrà / Victoria de los Ángeles, Rosario Gómez, Bernabé Martí, Joaquín Deus - Ediciones FVdA, 1958, live in Edinburgh
- Frühbeck de Burgos / Victoria de los Ángeles, Ines Rivadeneira, Carlo Cossutta, Victor de Narké - EMI, 1965
- García Navarro / Teresa Berganza, Alicia Nafé, José Carreras, Juan Pons - Deutsche Grammophon, 1978
- López Cobos / Alicia Nafé, Catherine Keen, Antonio Ordóñez, Michael Wadsworth - Telarc, 1992
- Mata / Martha Senn, Cecilia Angell, Fernando de la Mora, William Alvarado - Dorian, 1993
- García Navarro / María José Montiel, Alicia Nafé, Giacomo Aragall, Alfonso Echeverría - RTVE (DVD), 1997, live in Madrid
- Josep Pons / Inmaculada Egido, Mabel Perelstein, Antonio Ordóñez, Enrique Baquerizo - Harmonia Mundi, 1997
- Frühbeck de Burgos / Maria Rodríguez, Paola Pelliciari, César Hernández, Marcello Lippi - Dynamic, 2001, live in Cagliari
- Valdés / Ana María Sánchez, Alicia Nafé, Vicente Ombuena Valls, Alfonso Echeverría - Naxos, 2002, live in Oviedo
- Maazel / Cristina Gallardo-Domâs, María Luisa Corbacho, Jorge de León Paco, Felipe Bou - C Major (DVD), 2010, live in Valencia
