= Harpsichord Concerto (Falla) =

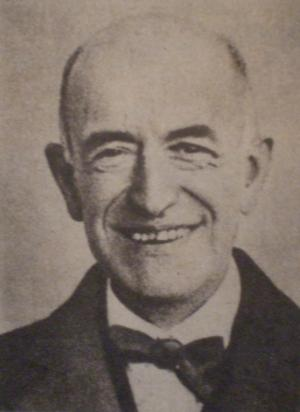
Manuel de Falla in 1919

Spanish composer Manuel de Falla's Concerto for Harpsichord, Flute, Oboe, Clarinet, Violin and Cello was written in 1923–26 for Wanda Landowska, who participated in its premiere.

== History ==
Falla had met the dedicatee on several occasions in the early 1920s, and by the time she participated in the Paris premiere of Falla's El retablo de maese Pedro in June 1923, he had already decided to write a concerto for her. Although there was never a formal commission, composition began in October 1923 but work proceeded slowly. Landowska first planned to perform the work in the 1923–24 season. When Falla found it impossible to meet that deadline, Landowska discussed with Leopold Stokowski a performance as part of the Philadelphia Orchestra's 1924–25 season, but again Falla could not finish the work in time. The premiere finally took place in Barcelona on 5 November 1926, with further performances in New York and Boston.

The Concerto was the last lengthy work Falla completed. Although there are several subsequent pieces in his catalogue that are important for their content, none of them lasts more than ten minutes, and his final, monumental project, the opera-oratorio Atlántida, on which he worked for twenty years, remained unfinished at his death.

It is commonly regarded as a model example of both mysticism (of a sort originating in Spanish religious tradition) and a severe and ascetic form of neoclassicism (as opposed to the "frivolous" neoclassicism of Igor Stravinsky).

== Analysis ==
The work is in three movements:

1. Allegro
2. Lento (giubiloso ed energico)
3. Vivace (flessibile, scherzando)

An abundance of surviving documents facilitates an understanding of both the slow, meticulous creative evolution and also the structure of the work. On the one hand, there is the extensive correspondence between Wanda Landowska and Falla from the period 1922 to 1930, and on the other hand numerous sketches, drafts, and intermediate stages of the score that are preserved in the Manuel de Falla Archive and the Archive Valentín Ruiz-Aznar, both located in Granada.

The second movement is inscribed at the end "A. Do. MCMXXVI—In festo Corporis Christi", though the composer said the date was "a matter of pure chance".
