= Luis Antonio García Navarro =

Spanish conductor

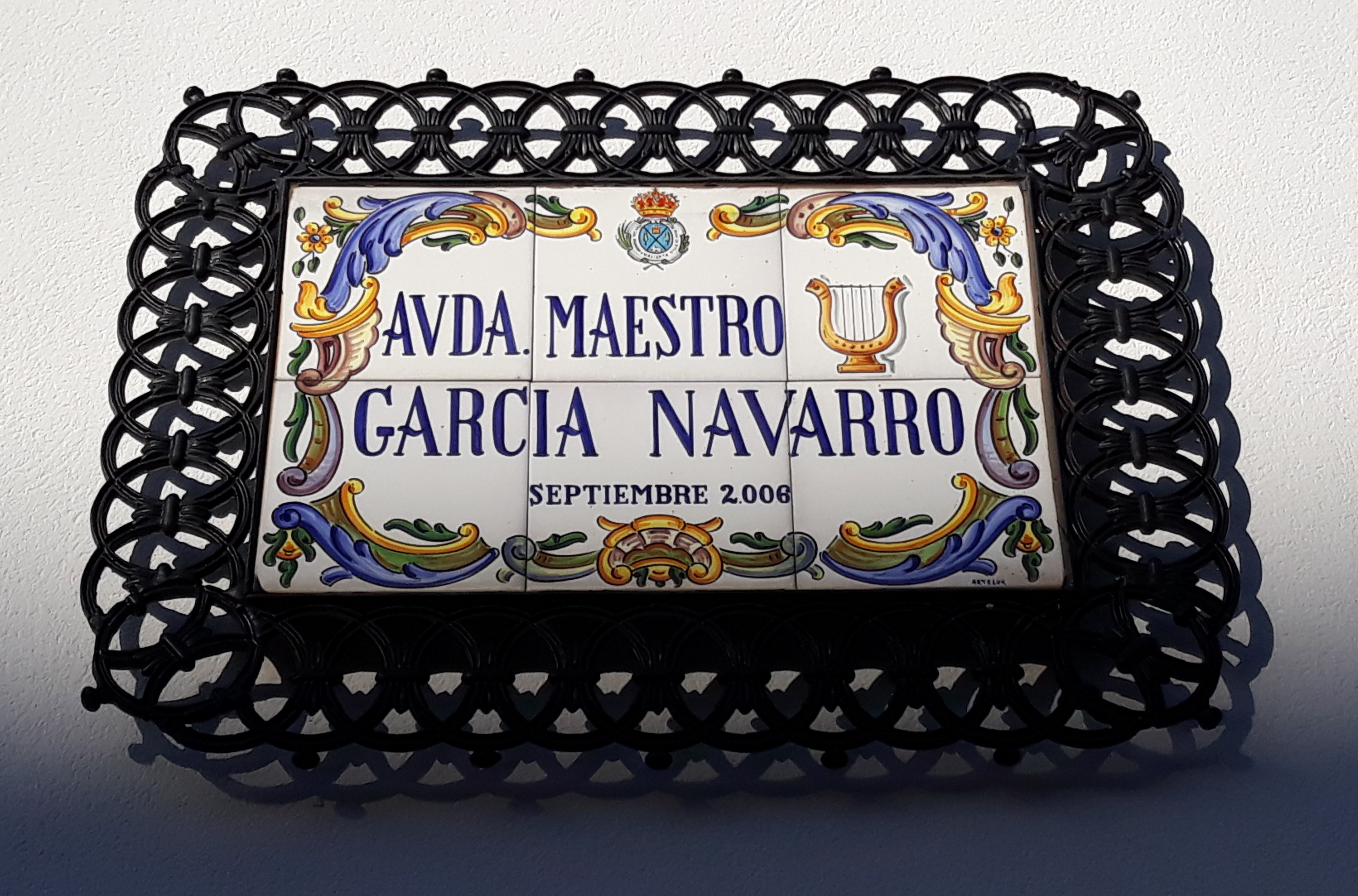

Luis Antonio García Navarro (30 April 1941 in Chiva, Valencian Community, Spain – 10 October 2001 in Madrid, Spain) was a Spanish conductor.

== Biography ==
García Navarro was born in Chiva (Spain), and studied in Valencia and the Madrid Royal Conservatory before moving to Vienna to study at the University of Music and Performing Arts with Hans Swarowsky, Karl Oesterreicher, and Reinhold Schmid. He won the first prize of the Besançon Conducting Competition's Junior Section in 1967.

García Navarro served as music director of the Valencia Orchestra from 1970 until his appointment as associate conductor of the Noordelijk Filharmonisch Orkest in Groningen from (1974–1978). He later was the music director of Lisbon's Portuguese Radio Symphony Orchestra (1976–1978) and National Opera at the Sao Carlos Theater (1980–1982). In 1979 he made his debut as an opera conductor at the Royal Opera House, and made his American debut in 1980. From 1987 to 1991 he was the general music director of the Württemberg State Theater in Stuttgart. In 1996, García Navarro was confirmed as the first music director of the Teatro Real after the re-inauguration. In 2001 he died in Madrid after a long illness.

Cultural offices
Preceded by ?	Music Director of the Teatro Real; 1997–2001	Succeeded by Jesús López-Cobos (2003–2010)
